= Mette Klit =

Danish handball coach (born 1971)

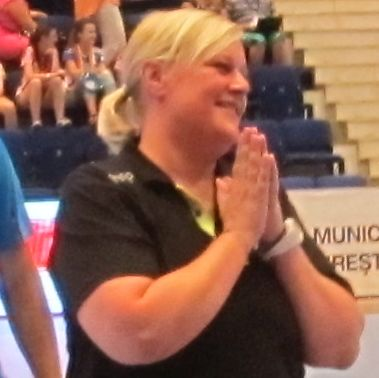

Personal information
- Nationality: Danish
- Born: 21 November 1971 (age 54) Esbjerg, Denmark

Sport
- Sport: Handball
- Position: Right Back

Senior clubs
- Years: Team
- 1998–2009: Viborg HK

Teams managed
- 2011: Viborg HK
- 2011–2012: Viborg HK Sportscollege
- 2012–2013: CS Oltchim Vâlcea (assistant)
- 2014–2015: CSM Bucharest

Mette Klit (born 21 November 1971 in Esbjerg) is a Danish handball coach and former handballer.

== Career ==
In the spring of 2011, she was the only female head coach in the Danish Women's Handball League. She was the head coach for Viborg HK, after she replaced Jakob Vestergaard. Before that she was assistant coach in the club. In the summer break 2011 she was replaced by Martin Albertsen. Mette Klit joined then Viborg HK Sportscollege in leadership role.

In the summer of 2012, Klit joined CS Oltchim Râmnicu Vâlcea as assistant to manager Jakob Vestergaard, with whom she had worked before at Viborg HK. She eventually left the club in the summer of 2013. Vestergaard left the Romanian top side on the same occasion

== Honours ==
=== Player ===
Viborg HK

- Champions League:
  - Finalist: 2001
- Champions Trophy:
  - Winner: 2001
- EHF Cup:
  - Winner: 1999

=== Coach ===
CSM Bucharest

- Liga Naţională:
  - Winner: 2015
- Cupa României:
  - Finalist: 2015
- Bucharest Trophy:
  - Winner: 2014
