= 2015 Bucharest Trophy =

- 2015 Bucharest Trophy official logo

Tournament details
- Dates: 20–23 August
- Teams: 6 (from 1 confederation)

Final positions
- Champions: (Romania) CSM Bucharest (2nd title)
- Runners-up: (Montenegro) ŽRK Budućnost
- Third place: (North Macedonia) ŽRK Vardar

Awards
- Best player: (Denmark) Line Jørgensen

The 2015 Bucharest Trophy was the second edition of the Bucharest Trophy held in Bucharest, Romania from 21 to 24 August as a pre-season international women's team handball tournament for clubs. The most recent runners-up of the EHF Champions League edition (Larvik HK) have been also invited but withdrew before making a debut due to season's fixtures.

The whole tournament was aired on Digi Sport 1, Digi Sport 2 and Digi Sport 3.

== Participants ==
- (Romania) CSM Bucharest (hosts & 2014 Bucharest Trophy winners)
- (Montenegro) ŽRK Budućnost (2014–15 EHF Champions League winners)
- (Romania) HCM Baia Mare
- (North Macedonia) ŽRK Vardar (2014–15 EHF Champions League bronze medalists)
- (Russia) Rostov-Don (2014–15 EHF Cup finalists)
- (Romania) Corona Brașov

== Results ==
=== Group stage ===
==== Group A ====
Team	Pld	W	D	L	GF	GA	GD	Pts
(Montenegro) ŽRK Budućnost	2	1	0	1	48	46	+2	2
(Russia) Rostov-Don	2	1	0	1	52	51	+1	2
(Romania) HCM Baia Mare	2	1	0	1	48	51	−3	2

20 August 2015; 16:30	ŽRK Budućnost (Montenegro)	26 – 23	(Russia) Rostov-Don	Polyvalent Hall, Bucharest
20 August 2015; 16:30	Petrović 9	(13–12)	Ilina 5	Polyvalent Hall, Bucharest
20 August 2015; 16:30		Report		Polyvalent Hall, Bucharest

21 August 2015; 16:30	HCM Baia Mare (Romania)	25 – 29	(Russia) Rostov-Don	Polyvalent Hall, Bucharest; Referees: Iliescu, Manea (ROU)
21 August 2015; 16:30	do Nascimento 6	(14–15)	Sen 6	Polyvalent Hall, Bucharest; Referees: Iliescu, Manea (ROU)
21 August 2015; 16:30		Report		Polyvalent Hall, Bucharest; Referees: Iliescu, Manea (ROU)

22 August 2015; 15:00	ŽRK Budućnost (Montenegro)	22 – 23	(Romania) HCM Baia Mare	Polyvalent Hall, Bucharest; Attendance: 1,700; Referees: Dobre, Potârniche (ROU)
22 August 2015; 15:00	four players 4	(9–11)	do Nascimento 4	Polyvalent Hall, Bucharest; Attendance: 1,700; Referees: Dobre, Potârniche (ROU)
22 August 2015; 15:00		Report		Polyvalent Hall, Bucharest; Attendance: 1,700; Referees: Dobre, Potârniche (ROU)

==== Group B ====
Team	Pld	W	D	L	GF	GA	GD	Pts
(Romania) CSM Bucharest	2	2	0	0	64	51	+13	4
(North Macedonia) ŽRK Vardar	2	1	0	1	55	61	−6	2
(Romania) Corona Brașov	2	0	0	2	49	56	−7	0

20 August 2015; 19:00	ŽRK Vardar (North Macedonia)	27 – 26	(Romania) Corona Brașov	Polyvalent Hall, Bucharest; Referees: Florescu, Stoia (ROU)
20 August 2015; 19:00	Lekić 7	(10–14)	Zamfir 8	Polyvalent Hall, Bucharest; Referees: Florescu, Stoia (ROU)
20 August 2015; 19:00		Report		Polyvalent Hall, Bucharest; Referees: Florescu, Stoia (ROU)

21 August 2015; 19:00	CSM Bucharest (Romania)	29 – 23	(Romania) Corona Brașov	Polyvalent Hall, Bucharest; Referees: Pîrvu, Stamatoiu (ROU)
21 August 2015; 19:00	Rodrigues 6	(14–10)	Cartaș 8	Polyvalent Hall, Bucharest; Referees: Pîrvu, Stamatoiu (ROU)
21 August 2015; 19:00		Report		Polyvalent Hall, Bucharest; Referees: Pîrvu, Stamatoiu (ROU)

22 August 2015; 17:30	ŽRK Vardar (North Macedonia)	28 – 35	(Romania) CSM Bucharest	Polyvalent Hall, Bucharest; Referees: Iliescu, Manea (ROU)
22 August 2015; 17:30	Lekić 6	(12–20)	Jørgensen 9	Polyvalent Hall, Bucharest; Referees: Iliescu, Manea (ROU)
22 August 2015; 17:30		Report		Polyvalent Hall, Bucharest; Referees: Iliescu, Manea (ROU)

=== Knockout stages ===
==== 5th place game ====
23 August 2015; 13:00	HCM Baia Mare (Romania)	31 – 29	(Romania) Corona Brașov	Polyvalent Hall, Bucharest
23 August 2015; 13:00	do Nascimento 8	(16–16)	Zamfir 11	Polyvalent Hall, Bucharest
23 August 2015; 13:00		Report		Polyvalent Hall, Bucharest

==== 3rd place game ====
23 August 2015; 15:30	ŽRK Vardar (North Macedonia)	33 – 27	(Russia) Rostov-Don	Polyvalent Hall, Bucharest
23 August 2015; 15:30	Lekić 6	(13–12)	Ilina 8	Polyvalent Hall, Bucharest
23 August 2015; 15:30		Report		Polyvalent Hall, Bucharest

==== Final ====
23 August 2015; 18:00	CSM Bucharest (Romania)	27 – 26	(Montenegro) ŽRK Budućnost	Polyvalent Hall, Bucharest; Attendance: 2,000
23 August 2015; 18:00	Jørgensen 7	(14–13)	Bulatović 9	Polyvalent Hall, Bucharest; Attendance: 2,000
23 August 2015; 18:00		Report		Polyvalent Hall, Bucharest; Attendance: 2,000

== Awards ==
=== Team of the Tournament ===
- Goalkeeper: Mayssa Pessoa (BRA)
- Left wing: Elena Avdekova (RUS)
- Left back: Cristina Neagu (ROU)
- Playmaker: Andrea Lekić (SRB)
- Pivot: Dragana Cvijić (SRB)
- Right back: Line Jørgensen (DEN)
- Right wing: Cristina Vărzaru (ROU)

=== Special awards ===
- Top Scorer: Cristina Zamfir (ROU)
- Most Valuable Player: Line Jørgensen (DEN)
- Best Defender: Gabriela Perianu (ROU)
- Fair Play Award: Ana Maria Mîrcă-Olariu (ROU)
