= Andrea Lekić =

Serbian handball player (born 1987)

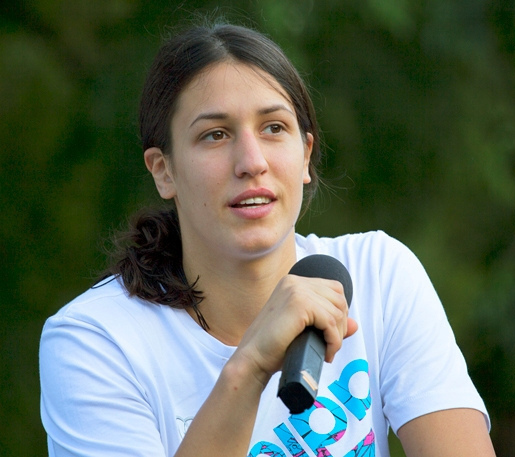
- Lekić in 2011

Personal information
- Nationality: Serbian
- Born: 6 September 1987 (age 39) Belgrade, SR Serbia, Yugoslavia
- Height: 1.78 m (5 ft 10 in)

Sport
- Sport: Handball
- Position: Centre back

Senior clubs
- Years: Team
- 1998–2005: ORK Beograd
- 2005–2006: ŽRK Radnički Belgrade
- 2006–2007: ŽRK Knjaz Miloš
- 2007–2011: RK Krim
- 2011–2013: Győri ETO KC
- 2013–2018: HC Vardar
- 2018–2020: CSM București
- 2020–2021: ŽRK Budućnost
- 2021–2022: RK Krim
- 2022–2025: Ferencvárosi TC
National team
Years	Team	Apps	(Gls)
2006–2021	Serbia	122	(556)
Medal record
World Championship
Silver medal – second place	2013 Serbia

Andrea Lekić (Serbian Cyrillic: Андреа Лекић; born 6 September 1987) is a Serbian former handballer.

In 2013 Lekić was chosen IHF World Player of the Year. She was also one of the candidates for 2011 IHF World Player of the Year award.

Lekić also played beach handball, where she represented the Serbia-Montenegro national team at the 2006 European Championship.

== Career ==
Lekić started her career in 1998 at the Serbian club ORK Belgrade. In 2005 she joined league rivals ŽRK Radnički Belgrade. A year later she joined ŽRK Knjaz Miloš in Aranđelovac. Here she won the Serbian Championship in 2007.

She then joined Slovenian side RK Krim, where she played for four years. In that time she won both the Slovenian championship and the Slovenian cup four times.

Her next club was Győri ETO KC in Hungary. Regarding the transfer, she said that she chose Ferencvaros as it gave her the best chances of winning the EHF Champions League. Here she won the Hungarian championship and the Hungarian cup double in 2012 and 2013, as well as the 2013 EHF Champions League.

She then joined the Macedonian club HC Vardar, where she won the Macedonian championship and Macedonian Cup every year from 2014 to 2018.

She then moved to Romania to join CSM București. Here she won the Romanian cup in 2019.

In 2020 she joined ŽRK Budućnost Podgorica. Here she won another set of the domestic titles.

A year later she returned to Slovenian RK Krim, where she once again won both the Slovenian championship and cup.

In 2022 she joined Hungarian side Ferencváros. With Ferencvaros she won the Hungarian championship in 2024, the Hungarian cup in 2023 and 2024 and reached the EHF Champions League final in 2023, where she lost to Norwegian Vipers Kristiansand 28:24.

=== National team ===
She has represented Serbian at the 2006, 2008, 2010 and 2012 European Women's Handball Championship. At the 2012 games she was selected for the tournament all star team.

At the 2013 World Women's Handball Championship she won silver medals with the Serbian national team.

== Other accomplishments ==
She is the main organizer of the “Andrea Lekic” handball academy for children, which debuted successfully in 2013, and she has serious expansion plans in the future. She graduated from the Faculty of Tourism and Hotel Management and received the title Bachelor of Economy, and she studies at the Faculty of Sports.

Lekić was given the award of Honorary Citizen of the cities of Győr, Hungary and Vrnjačka Banja, Serbia.

== International honours ==
=== Club ===
- EHF Champions League:
  - Gold Medalist: 2013
  - Silver Medalist: 2012, 2017, 2018, 2023
- Serbian First League
  - Winner: 2007
- Slovenian First League
  - Winner: 2008, 2009, 2010, 2011, 2022
- Slovenian Cup
  - Winner: 2008, 2009, 2010, 2011, 2022
- Nemzeti Bajnokság I:
  - Winner: 2012, 2013, 2024
- Magyar Kupa:
  - Winner: 2012, 2013, 2023, 2024, 2025
- Macedonian First League
  - Winner: 2014, 2015, 2016, 2017, 2018, 2021
- Macedonian Cup
  - Winner: 2014, 2015, 2016, 2017, 2018, 2021
- Romanian Supercup:
  - Winner: 2019
- Romanian Cup:
  - Winner: 2019

=== National team ===
- World Championship:
  - Silver Medalist: 2013

== Awards and recognition ==
- MVP of the Women's Regional Handball League: 2009
- All-Star Playmaker of the European Championship: 2012
- IHF World Player of the Year: 2013
- Team of the Tournament Playmaker of the Bucharest Trophy: 2015
- Balkan-Handball.com Ex-Yugoslavian Handballer of the Year: 2014, 2017
- Balkan-Handball.com Serbian Handballer of the Year: 2009, 2010, 2011, 2012, 2013, 2016, 2017
- Liga Națională Centre Back of the Season: 2019

Awards
Preceded by Alexandra do Nascimento	IHF World Player of the Year – Women; 2013	Succeeded by Eduarda Amorim
