= Polina Kuznetsova =

Russian handball player (born 1987)

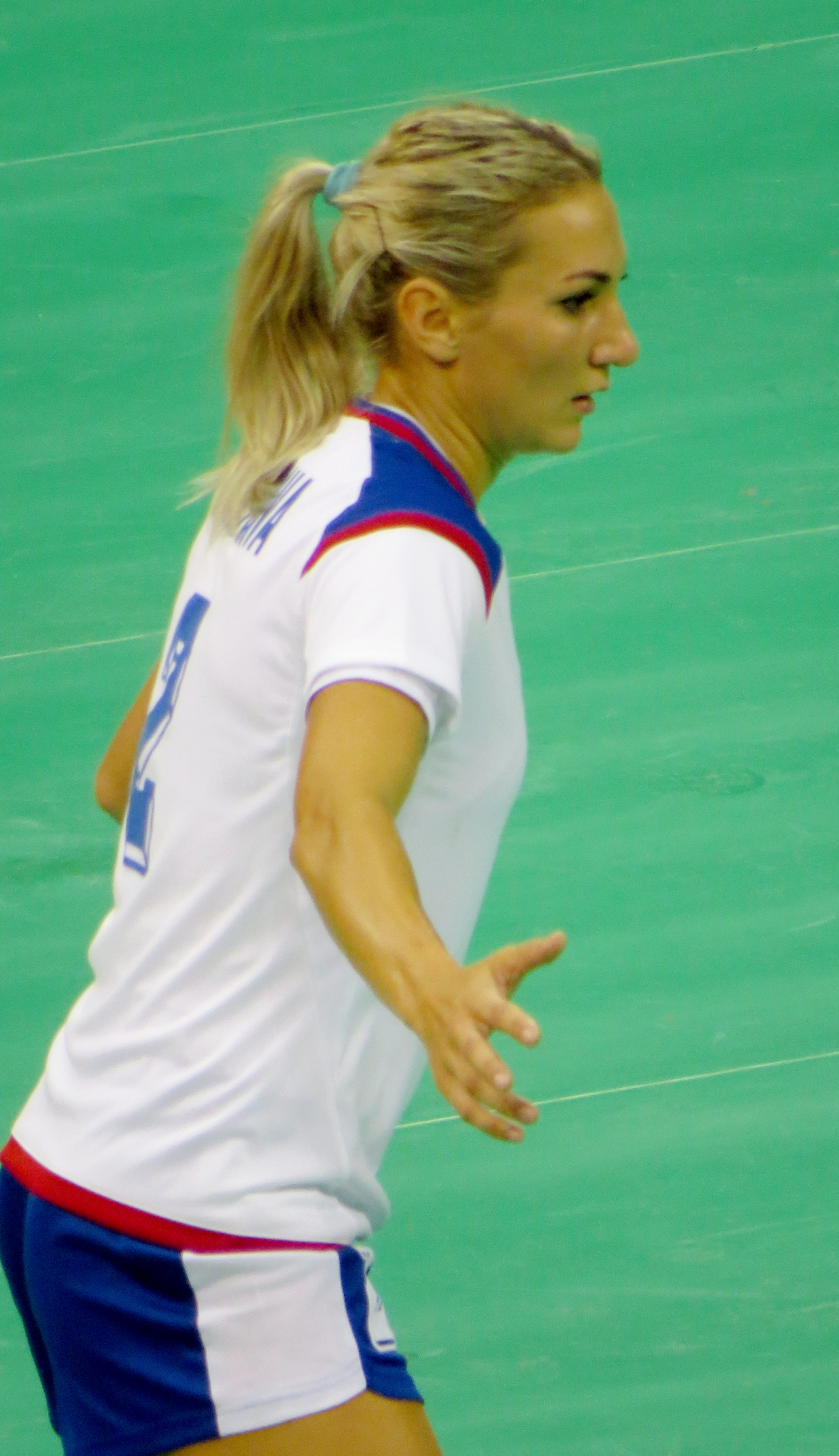
- Kuznetsova at the 2016 Summer Olympics

Personal information
- Full name: Polina Viktorovna Kuznetsova
- Nationality: Russian
- Born: 10 June 1987 (age 39) Shopokov, Kyrgyzstan
- Height: 1.68 m (5 ft 6 in)

Sport
- Sport: Handball
- Position: Left wing
- Current club: Rostov-Don
- Number: 88

Senior clubs
- Years: Team
- 2002–2003: Dinamo Volgograd
- 2003–2004: Rostov-Don
- 2004–2006: Handball Club Lada
- 2006–2013: Zvezda Zvenigorod
- 2013–2016: HC Astrakhanochka
- 2016–2017: HC Kuban Krasnodar
- 2017–2018: HC Vardar
- 2018–: Rostov-Don
National team
Years	Team	Apps	(Gls)
2005–2021	Russia	157	(419)
Medal record
Representing ROC
Olympic Games
Silver medal – second place	2020 Tokyo	Team
Representing Russia
Olympic Games
Gold medal – first place	2016 Rio de Janeiro	Team
World Championship
Gold medal – first place	2005 Russia	Team
Gold medal – first place	2007 France	Team
Bronze medal – third place	2019 Japan	Team
European Championship
Silver medal – second place	2006 Sweden	Team
Silver medal – second place	2018 France	Team
European Junior Championship
Gold medal – first place	2004 Czech Republic	Team
European Youth Championship
Gold medal – first place	2003 Russia	Team

Polina Viktorovna Kuznetsova (Russian: Полина Викторовна Кузнецова, IPA: [pɐˈlʲinə kʊzʲnʲɪˈtsovə], née Vyakhireva; born 10 June 1987) is a Russian handball player for Rostov-Don and formerly the Russian national team.

== National team ==
She won gold medals with the Russian national team at the 2016 Rio Olympics and 2005 and 2007 world championships, and was included into the 2007 championship's All-Star Team. She retired from the national team, in August 2021.

She competes internationally alongside her sister Anna Vyakhireva.

== Career ==
Kuznetzova started for career at Dinamo Volgograd in 2002 before joining Rostov-Don after a single season. In 2004 she joined Handball Club Lada where she won the 2005 and 2006 Russian championship. In February 2007 she joined Zvezda Zvenigorod, where she won the 2007 Russian championship and EHF European League, the 2009, 2010, 2011 and 2014 Russian cup and the 2008 EHF Champions League.

In 2014 she joined HC Astrakhanochka, where she won the 2016 Russian championship.

After 2 years she joined HC Kuban Krasnodar. After a season she joined North Macedonian HC Vardar. Here she won the double in the single season she played at the club. She then returned to Rostov-Don. Here she won the 2019, 2020 and 2022 Russian championships.

== Individual awards ==
- All-Star Left Wing of the World Championship: 2007
- All-Star Left Wing of the European Championship: 2012
- Team of the Tournament Left Wing of the Bucharest Trophy: 2014
- All-Star Left Wing of the Summer Olympics: 2016, 2020
