= Iryna Glibko =

Ukrainian handball player (1990–2024)

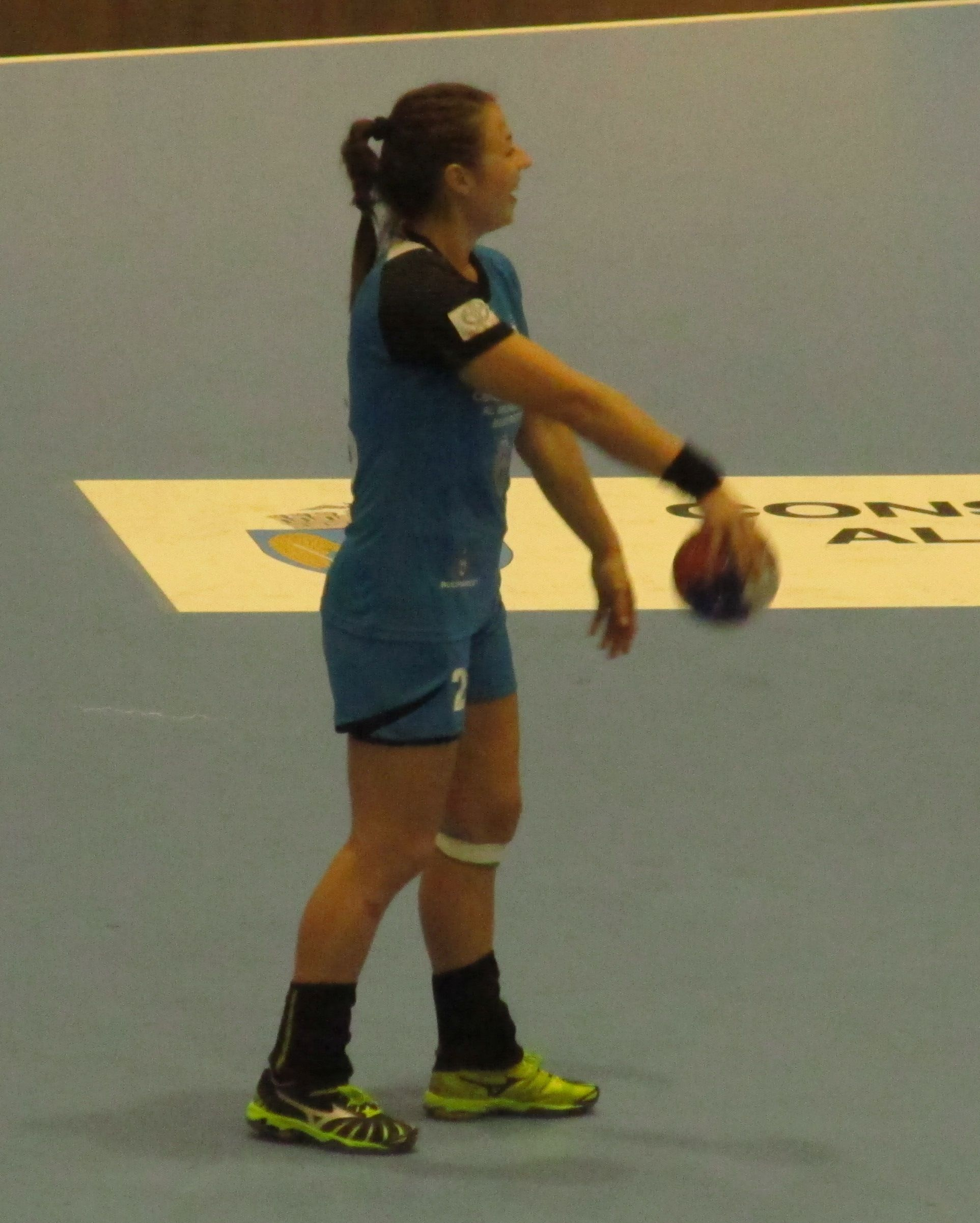
- Glibko in 2014

Personal information
- Nationality: Ukrainian
- Born: 18 February 1990 Odesa, Ukrainian SSR, USSR
- Died: 28 August 2024 (aged 34) Râmnicu Vâlcea, Romania
- Height: 1.69 m (5 ft 7 in)

Sport
- Sport: Handball
- Position: Centre back, Left back

Senior clubs
- Years: Team
- 2007-2009: Galytchanka Lviv
- 2009-2011: Zaporizhzhia-ZSEA
- 2011-2012: Podatkova University
- 2012-2013: Danubius Galați
- 2013-2015: CSM București
- 2015-2017: HCM Roman
- 2017-2024: SCM Râmnicu Vâlcea
National team
- Years: Team
- 2012-2024: Ukraine

Iryna Glibko (Ukrainian: Ірина Глібко; 18 February 1990 – 28 August 2024) was a Ukrainian professional handballer who last played in Liga Națională for the club SCM Râmnicu Vâlcea and the Ukrainian national team. Born in Odesa, Ukraine on 18 February 1990, Glibko died of cancer in Râmnicu Vâlcea, Romania on 28 August 2024, at the age of 34.

== Trophies ==
- Liga Națională:
  - Winner: 2015, 2019
- Cupa României:
  - Winner: 2020
- Supercupa României:
  - Winner: 2018, 2020
- Bucharest Trophy:
  - Winner: 2014

== Individual awards ==
- Liga Națională Top Scorer: 2013, 2018
- Cupa României Top Scorer: 2018
- Liga Națională Left Back of the Season: 2019
- Liga Națională Foreign Player of the Season: 2019, 2023
