= Line Jørgensen =

Danish handball player (born 1989)

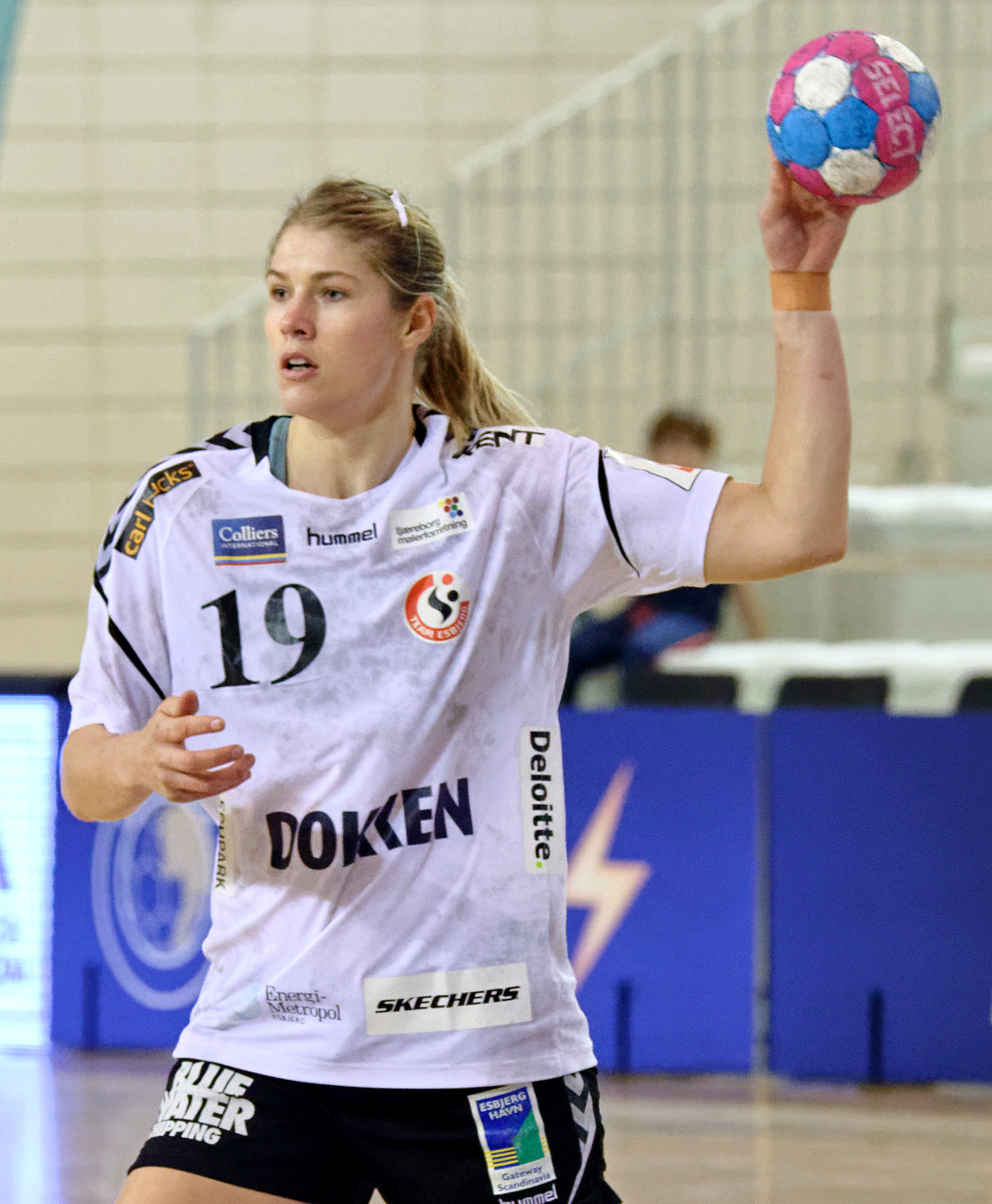

Personal information
- Full name: Line Anna Ryborg Jørgensen Myers
- Nationality: Danish
- Born: 31 December 1989 (age 36) Hvidovre, Denmark
- Height: 1.86 m (6 ft 1 in)

Sport
- Sport: Handball
- Position: Right back

Youth career
- Years: Team
- 1993–2001: Hvidovre IF
- 2001–2006: BK Ydun

Senior clubs
- Years: Team
- 2006–2009: GOG Svendborg TGI
- 2006–2008: BK Ydun (loan)
- 2009–2010: Odense Håndbold
- 2010–2015: FC Midtjylland
- 2015–2018: CSM București
- 2018–2022, 2026–: Team Esbjerg
National team
| Years | Team | Apps | (Gls) |
| 2007–2018 | Denmark | 149 | (352) |
Medal record
World Championship
| Bronze medal – third place | 2013 Serbia |
IHF Youth World Championship
| Gold medal – first place | 2006 Canada |
European Junior Championship
| Gold medal – first place | 2007 Turkey |
European Youth Championship
| Gold medal – first place | 2005 Austria |

Line Anna Ryborg Jørgensen Myers (born 31 December 1989) is a Danish handball player for Team Esbjerg and formerly the Danish national team.

She was given the award of Cetățean de onoare ("Honorary Citizen") of the city of Bucharest in 2016.

== Handball career ==
Line Myers startet playing handball at the age of 3 at Hvidovre IF, before switching to BK Ydun at the age of 12.

She debuted for the Danish national team in 2007, and played her first major tournament at the 2010 European Women's Handball Championship in Denmark. In 2012 she was appointed captain of the Danish national team after Karin Mortensen retired.

At the 2013 World Championship, she was a part of the Danish team that won bronze medals, breaking a 9-year streak without medals for the Danish team. They beat Poland 30–26.

She won the Danish Championship in 2015 with FC Midtjylland Håndbold, before switching to Romanian club CSM Bucuresti the following season. Here she won the EHF Champions League. She played in Romanian handball for 3 years before she returned to Denmark to play for the Danish top club Team Esbjerg.

After 4 years at Team Esbjerg, where she won the Danish Championship twice, she retired in 2022.

== Post-playing career ==
In 2022 she was hired as a coach for the Danish U15 and U17 national teams.

At the 2021 Danish local elections she ran for office in her home municipality, Esbjerg Municipality, for the local party 'Borgerlisten', but did not achieve election.

== Achievements ==
=== Club ===
- Danish Championship:
  - Winner: 2011, 2013, 2015, 2019, 2020
  - Silver Medalist: 2014
  - Bronze Medalist: 2012
- Danish Cup:
  - Winner: 2012, 2014
  - Finalist: 2013
- Danish Supercup:
  - Winner: 2013, 2014, 2019
- Romanian Championship:
  - Winner: 2016, 2017
- EHF Champions League:
  - Winner: 2016
  - Bronze Medalist: 2017, 2018
- EHF Cup:
  - Winner: 2011
  - Semifinalist: 2013
- EHF Cup Winners' Cup:
  - Winner: 2015
- Bucharest Trophy:
  - Winner: 2015

=== National team ===
- European Championship:
  - Fourth place: 2010
- World Championship:
  - Bronze Medalist: 2013
  - Fourth place: 2011

== Individual awards ==
- All-Star Right Back of the World Championship: 2011
- MVP of the Bucharest Trophy: 2015
- Team of the Tournament Right Back of the Bucharest Trophy: 2015
