= Mayssa Pessoa =

Brazilian handball player (born 1984)

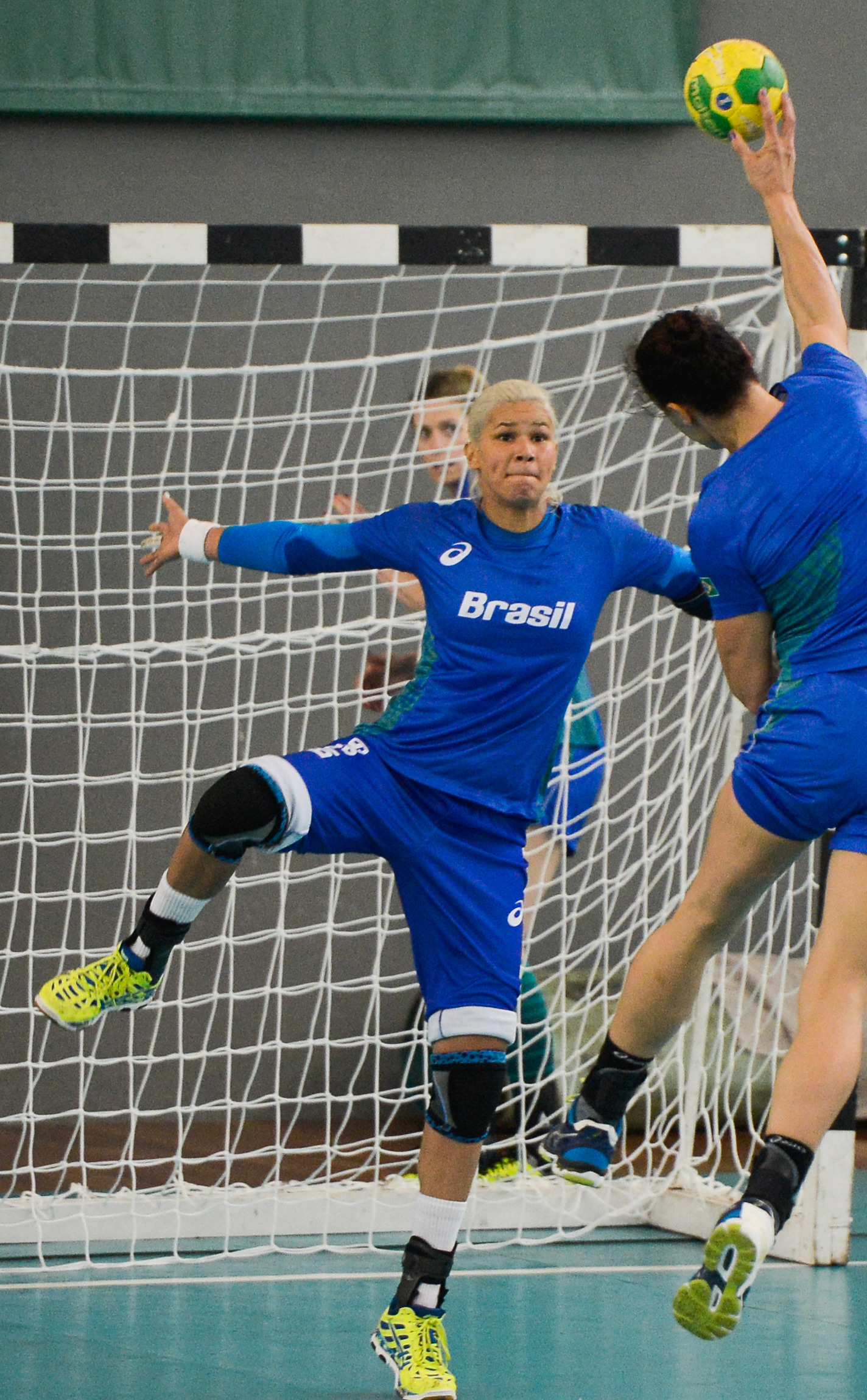
- Mayssa in 2016

Personal information
- Full name: Mayssa Raquel de Oliveira Pessoa
- Born: 11 September 1984 (age 42) João Pessoa, Brazil
- Height: 1.80 m (5 ft 11 in)

Sport
- Sport: Handball
- Position: Goalkeeper

Senior clubs
- Years: Team
- –: Colégio Lourdinhas
- 2011–2012: Issy-Paris Hand
- 2012–2014: Dinamo Volgograd
- 2014–2016: CSM București
- 2016–2017: HC Vardar
- 2017–2021: Rostov-Don
- 2021–2023: Dunărea Brăila
- 2023–2024: HH Elite
- 2024–2025: Sola HK
- 2025–: Saint-Amand Handball
National team
Years	Team	Apps	(Gls)
2005-2024	Brazil	94	(0)
Medal record
Women's handball
World Championship
Gold medal – first place	2013 Serbia
Pan American Games
Gold medal – first place	2015 Toronto	Team
Pan American Championship
Gold medal – first place	2013 Dominican Republic
Women's beach handball
World Games
Gold medal – first place	2005 Duisburg
World Championship
Bronze medal – third place	2008 Cadiz
- Updated on 13 August 2024

Mayssa Raquel de Oliveira Pessoa, also known as Mayssa Pessoa (born 11 September 1984) is a Brazilian female handball goalkeeper for French club Saint-Amand Handball and formerly the Brazilian national team. In 2013 she won the World Championship; the first time ever for Brazil and South America.

She was one of nearly two dozen LGBT Olympians at the London Games.

== Career ==
Pessoa joined French side Issy-Paris Hand. A year later she joined Russian team Dinamo Volgograd to replace the injured Anna Sedoykina. Here she won the 2013 and 2014 Russian Super League.

In 2014 she joined Romanian CSM București. Together with three other Brazilian players she won the Romanian National League in 2015, which was the first in club history.

In her second season at the club she won the league for a second time in 2016, and this time she also won the Romanian cup and the 2016 Champions League, beating Hungarian Gyor in the final.

Afterwards she joined North Macedonian HC Vardar. Here she played a single season, where she won both the Macedonian league and cup.

In 2017 she returned to Russia and joined Rostov-Don. Here she won the Russian championship in 2018, 2019 and 2020.

In 2021 she joined Romanian Dunărea Brăila.

In 2023 she joined Danish side HH Elite to replace the pregnant Emily Stang Sando. In the 2023-24 season the team narrowly escaped relegation and finished in 12th out of 14.

The following summer she joined Norwegian Sola HK.

== Achievements ==
- World Championship:
  - Winner: 2013
- Pan American Championship:
  - Winner: 2013
- World Games:
  - Winner: 2005
- EHF Champions League:
  - Winner: 2016
  - Finalist: 2017
- French Championship:
  - Silver Medalist: 2012
- Russian Super League:
  - Winner: 2013, 2014, 2018, 2019, 2020
- Romanian National League:
  - Winner: 2015, 2016
- Romanian Cup:
  - Finalist: 2015
- Norwegian League:
  - Silver: 2024/25

== Awards and recognition ==
- All-Star Goalkeeper of the Pan American Championship: 2013
- MVP of the Bucharest Trophy: 2014
- Team of the Tournament Goalkeeper of the Bucharest Trophy: 2014, 2015

== Personal life ==
Pessoa comes from a family of intellectuals. Nicknamed Taffarel, she resides in the same city with Hulk (João Pessoa). Her father is a university professor and a former athlete who competed in handball, volleyball, basketball, futsal and beach handball. Her mother is a lawyer, and one of her two sisters is a pediatrician.
