= Annamária Ilyés =

Hungarian handball player (born 1980)

Personal information
- Nationality: Hungarian, Romanian
- Born: 9 July 1980 (age 46) Odorheiu Secuiesc, SR Romania

Sport
- Sport: Handball
- Position: Left Back
- Current club: Retired

Senior clubs
- Years: Team
- –: U Cluj-Napoca
- –2003: HCM Baia Mare
- 2003–2005: Váci NKSE
- 2005–2007: Kiskunhalas NKSE
- 2007–2008: Ferencvárosi TC
- 2008–2010: HSG Blomberg-Lippe
- 2010–2013: TuS Metzingen
- 2013–2016: SG BBM Bietigheim
National team
Years	Team	Apps
–	Romania	8
2006–	Hungary	

Annamária Ilyés (Hungarian: [ˈɒnnɒmaːriɒ ˈijeːʃ]; born 9 July 1980) is a former Hungarian-Romanian international handballer.

== Career ==
=== Club ===
Born in Odorheiu Secuiesc in Communist Romania into an ethnic Hungarian family, Ilyés began her career in her hometown club before moving to Universitatea Cluj-Napoca and later to HCM Baia Mare. She left Romania in 2003 and signed to the Hungarian championship to play for Váci NKSE. In 2005 Ilyés switched to Kiskunhalas NKSE and another two years later to Ferencvárosi TC, with whom she won a league bronze.

In 2008 Ilyés began playing in Germany, enjoying the most successful period of her career. Between 2008 and 2010 she played for HSG Blomberg-Lippe; with them she reached the semifinals of the EHF Challenge Cup in 2009, where they fell short to Handball Cercle Nîmes by a single goal (47–48 on aggregate).

In 2010 Ilyés was signed by German second division side TusSies Metzingen. She became top scorer of the second division both in 2011 and 2012 and was chosen as the best player of the season by the league coaches and journalists in 2012, helping her team to promotion in that year. Although Ilyés was one of the best players of her team in the next season as well, Metzingen suffered during its first top division year and secured its place for the coming season only with two rounds remaining. As it was announced already in March 2013, Ilyés switched to league rivals SG BBM Bietigheim for the next season.

=== International ===
A Romanian international since her youth, Ilyés chose Hungary over Romania. She earned 8 caps for Romania before declaring for Hungary in 2004. She obtained Hungarian citizenship in October 2006, and was subsequently called up to play for the Hungarian B national team.

== Individual awards ==
- Top Scorer of the Bucharest Trophy: 2014 (23 goals)

== Personal life ==
Her mother, Magdalena Mikloş, was silver medalist at the 1973 World Women's Handball Championship, while her brother, Ferenc Ilyés, is also a handball player.
