= Linnea Torstensson =

Swedish handball player (born 1983)

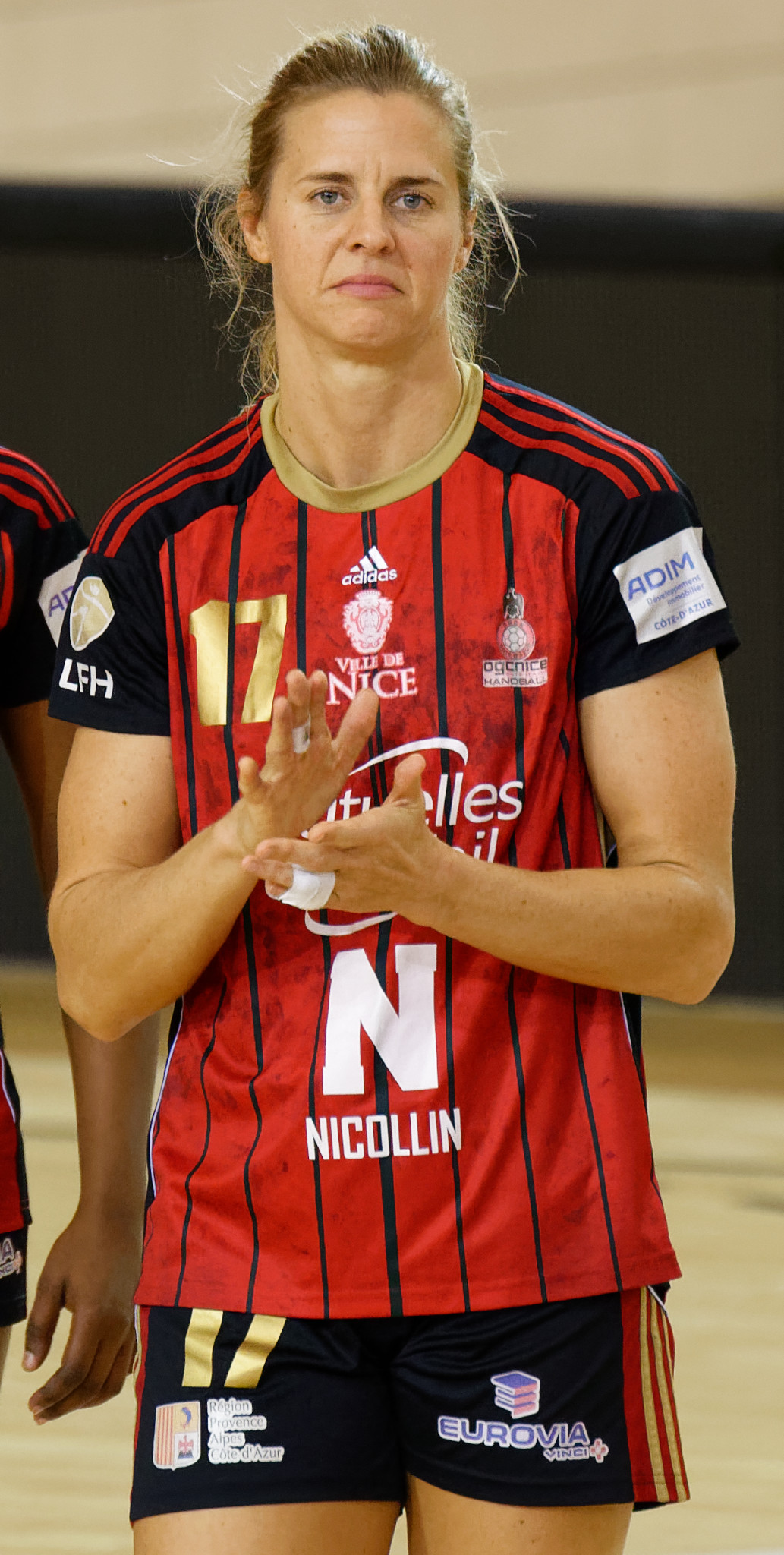
- Linnea Torstenson in 2017

Personal information
- Full name: Linnea Marie Torstenson
- Nationality: Swedish
- Born: 30 March 1983 (age 43) Stockholm, Sweden
- Height: 1.86 m (6 ft 1 in)

Sport
- Sport: Handball
- Position: Left back
- Current club: Retired

Senior clubs
- Years: Team
- –2004: IFK Strängnäs
- 2004–2007: Skövde HF
- 2007: GOG Svendborg
- 2007–2008: Skövde HF
- 2008–2010: Aalborg DH
- 2010–2012: FCM Håndbold
- 2012–2014: RK Krim
- 2014: Viborg HK
- 2014–2017: CSM București
- 2017–2019: Nice Handball
- 2019–2020: CSM București
National team
Years	Team	Apps	(Gls)
2005–2016	Sweden	175	(654)
Medal record
European Championship
Silver medal – second place	2010 Denmark & Norway
Bronze medal – third place	2014 Croatia/Hungary

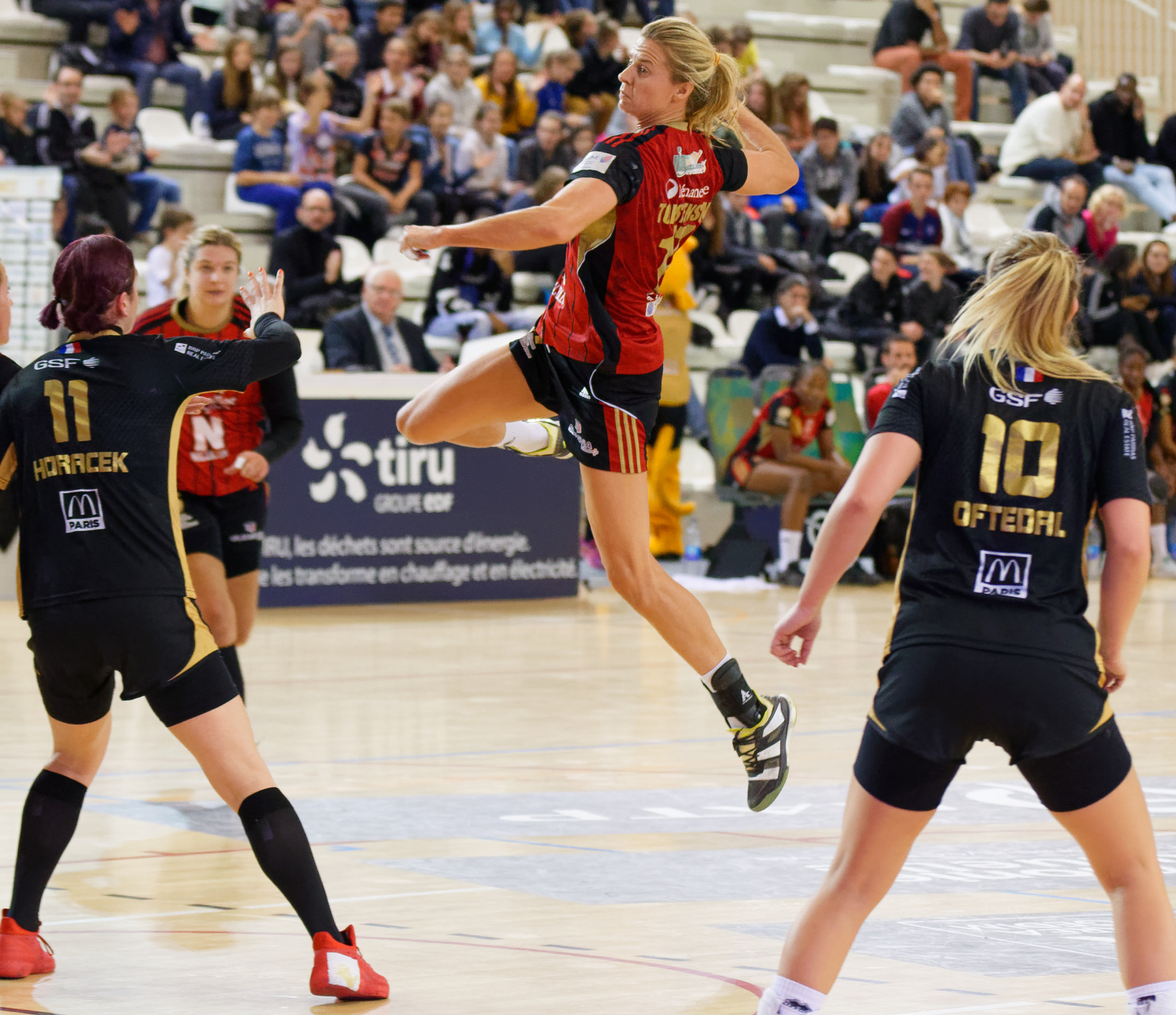
Issy Paris Hand vs OGC Nice.Issy Les Moulineaux, Nov.8, 2017.

Linnea Marie Torstensson (born 30 March 1983) is a Swedish former handballer who played for the Sweden national team. She competed in three Olympic Games (2008, 2012 & 2016).

She was given the award of Cetățean de onoare ("Honorary Citizen") of the city of Bucharest in 2016.

She was included in the European Handball Federation Hall of Fame in 2023.

== International honours ==
- EHF Champions League:
  - Winner: 2016
  - Bronze Medalist: 2017
- EHF Cup Winners' Cup:
  - Winner: 2014
- EHF Cup:
  - Winner: 2011
- Bucharest Trophy:
  - Winner: 2014, 2015
- European Championship:
  - Silver Medalist: 2010
  - Bronze Medalist: 2014
- Carpathian Trophy:
  - Winner: 2015

== Awards and recognition ==
- Most Valuable Player of the European Championship: 2010
- Handball-Planet.com Best Defensive Player: 2014
- Swedish Female Handballer of the Year: 2010, 2011
- Prosport Best Defender of the Romanian Liga Națională: 2017
- European Handball Federation Hall of Fame in 2023.
