= CSM București (women's handball) =

Romanian women's handball team

- Full name: Clubul Sportiv Municipal București
- Nickname: Tigroaicele (The Tigresses)
- Short name: CSM
- Founded: 2007; 19 years ago
- Arena: Sala Polivalentă
- Capacity: 5,300
- President: Iulian Pîslaru
- Head coach: Iulia Curea
- League: Liga Florilor
- 2025–26: Liga Națională, 2nd of 14
- Club colours
Home	Away

Clubul Sportiv Municipal București, also known as CSM București, CSM or CSM Bucharest, is a professional women's handball team based in Bucharest, Romania, that competes in the Liga Naţională and the EHF Women's Champions League. Founded in 2007, the club has traditionally worn a blue kit since its inception. The team has played its home matches in the 5,300-capacity Polyvalent Hall in the Tineretului Park in southern Bucharest. CSM București established itself as a major force in both Romanian and European handball in the late 2010s, winning the EHF Champions League in its debut season and reaching the Final Four three consecutive times. This success was replicated in the league, where the club won four consecutive times. The official CSM mascot is a "tiger". CSM Bucharest is one of the most widely supported handball clubs in Romania.

Location of CSM București

== History ==
=== Early years ===
CSM București was formed in 2007 by the General Council of Bucharest, as part of the program to promote handball among capital's youth. The team played in the second division of Romania for two seasons without notable results. At the end of the 2008–2009 season, Rapid București experienced financial problems and eleven of their players along with coach Vasile Mărgulescu, moved to CSM. Benefiting from the experience of several new players, the club won all its Divizia A matches and promoted to the Liga Națională. Since 2010, CSM Bucharest were a constant presence of the Liga Națională, and finished third in their debut season, after Oltchim Vâlcea and Universitatea Cluj-Napoca. The team made European debut playing in the 2011–2012 season of the EHF Cup, where they reached the Round of 16 but unfortunately being eventually beaten by Romanian HC Zalău. In the following two seasons they played in the Liga Națională without significant results.

=== First national title (2015) ===
Mărgulescu was fired after a poor start in 2014 and replaced with Mette Klit. The ambitious board aimed to win the Liga Națională next season, wanting to become even a threat to win the Champions League. In the spring of 2014, four Brazilian World Championship winners (Mayssa Pessoa, Ana Paula Rodrigues, Deonise Cavaleiro and Fernanda da Silva), plus 2014 European Championship's stars Carmen Martín and Linnea Torstenson, signed contracts at CSM. A strong squad was filled with local talent including Oana Manea, Iulia Curea or Talida Tolnai. The club hosted first edition of Bucharest Trophy in preseason. The hosts took the home advantage to win the final against Champions League Runners-Up ŽRK Budućnost. The Tigresses won their first eight matches of the season before losing to title rivals HCM Baia Mare. But at the second part of the season, CSM took revenge on Baia Mare with 29–23 win in Bucharest. They secured a spot in the playoffs and second place in the regular season. Eventually, they won 6 consecutive games, earning gold medal. CSM București beat HCM Baia Mare in both legs of the Championship Play Off Final. Previously they defeated HC Dunărea Brăila and Corona Braşov.

=== EHF Champions League triumph and domination in Romania (2016–) ===
By winning the national title, CSM qualified automatically for the groups of the 2015–16 EHF Champions League edition. Once again, the club makes another number of top transfers including Isabelle Gulldén, Romanian legend Aurelia Brădeanu and Danish duo Line Jørgensen and Maria Fisker. Between 20 and 23 August, Bucharest hosted in preseason the second Bucharest Trophy event and grabbed a second consecutive title by defeating Corona Braşov, ŽRK Vardar and ŽRK Budućnost in the final. In September 2015, Mette Klit was replaced in CSM, her Danish fellow Kim Rasmussen taking over. Under Rasmussen, The Tigresses attained a milestone of 25 consecutive league victories. A second championship was won in April 2016. In 2016, CSM won the treble winning all the country titles, including the Cup and the Supercup (both against HCM Roman). CSM București made Champions League debut playing against ŽRK Budućnost, IK Sävehof and SPR Lublin SSA in the group stage. Four wins over the opponents from Sweden and Poland, as well the Montenegro draw, secured second place. Into the main round, CSM bothered by injury. Győri Audi ETO KC and ŽRK Vardar defeated CSM but the team reached the knockout phase where the Romanian side beat undefeated Rostov-Don twice in the quarterfinals. At the continent finals, in May 2016, București qualified for Final 4 finals for the first time after a semifinal victory over ŽRK Vardar, winning 27–21. On 8 May, CSM București won their title beating Győri Audi ETO KC in the final after a nail-biting penalty shootout. Playmaker Isabelle Gulldén scored 15 goals for CSM and finished as Europe's top scorer, whilst Aurelia Brădeanu scored the final spot-kick. Goalkeeper Jelena Grubišić was named Finals MVP. CSM regained the trophy for Romania after a 52-year break.

== Kits ==
HOME
2014–15	2015–16	2016–17	2017–18	2018-19	2019–20	2020-

AWAY
2015–16	2016–17	2017–18	2019–20	2020-

THIRD
2015–16	2017–19	2019–20	2020-

== Honours ==
=== Domestic competitions ===
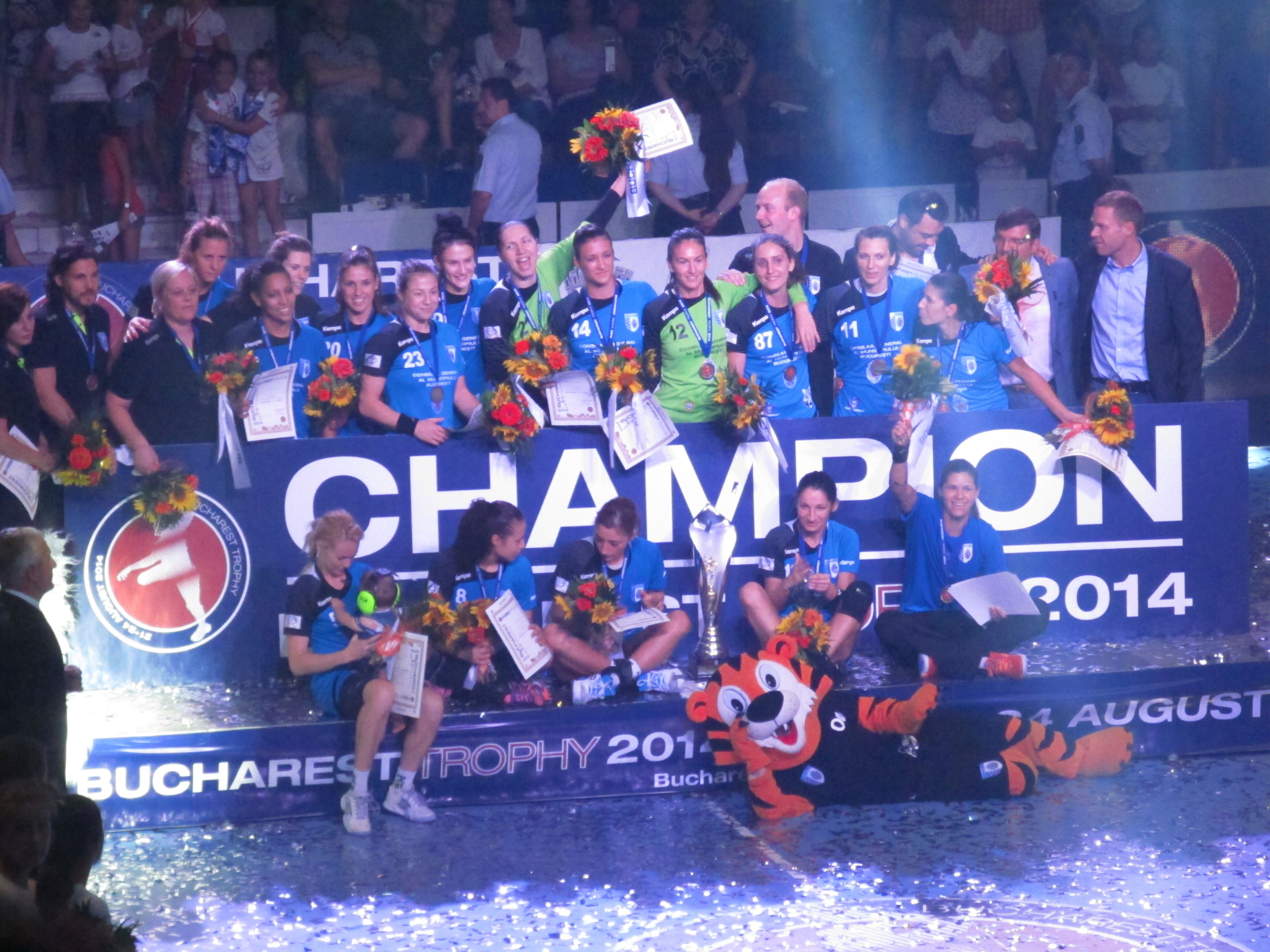
CSM Bucharest celebrating their Bucharest Trophy 2014 win against ŽRK Budućnost

- Liga Națională
  - Winners: (8) 2014–15, 2015–16, 2016–17, 2017–18, 2020–21, 2022–23, 2023–24, 2024–25
  - Second place: 2018–19, 2021–22
  - Third place: 2011
- Cupa României
  - Winners: (8) 2016, 2017, 2018, 2019, 2022, 2023, 2024, 2025
  - Finalist: 2015, 2020, 2021
- Supercupa României
  - Winners: (7) 2016, 2017, 2019, 2022, 2023, 2024, 2025
  - Finalist: 2015, 2018, 2020, 2021

=== European competitions ===
- EHF Champions League:
  - Winners: 2015–16
  - Third place: 2016–17, 2017–18, 2025–26
  - Quarterfinalists: 2019, 2020, 2021, 2022, 2023, 2024, 2025

=== Other competitions ===
- Bucharest Trophy
  - Winners – record: 2014, 2015

== Team ==
=== Current squad ===
Squad for the 2026-27 season

Goalkeepers

- 16 (Romania) Denisa Șandru
- 53 (Romania) Iulia Dumanska
- 94 (France) Catherine Gabriel

Left Wings

- 15 (Denmark) Emma Friis
- 21 (Romania) Alexandra Szőke (pregnant)

Right Wings

- 4 (Sweden) Matilda Forsberg
- 48 (Hungary) Dorottya Faluvégi

Line Players

- 18 (Faroe Islands) Pernille Brandenborg
- 34 (Montenegro) Tatjana Brnović
- 77 (Romania) Crina Pintea (c)

Left Backs

- 9 (Sweden) Tyra Axnér
- 59 (Hungary) Csenge Kuczora
- 88 (Denmark) Anne Mette Hansen

Centre Backs

- 5 (Romania) Alexandra Voicu
- 11 (Russia) Daria Dmitrieva
- 42 (Sweden) Jenny Carlson

Right Backs

- 22 (Norway) Kristina Novak
- 61 (Russia) Valeriia Maslova

Squad information
No.	Nat.	Player	Position	Date of birth	In	Contract until	Previous club
4	(Sweden)	Matilda Forsberg	Right Wing	26 February 1998	2026	2028	(Romania) CS Gloria Bistrița
5	(Romania)	Alexandra Voicu	Centre Back	1 April 2006	2025	2027	—N/a
9	(Sweden)	Tyra Axnér	Left Back	18 March 2002	2026	2028	(France) Metz Handball
11	(Russia)	Daria Dmitrieva	Centre Back	9 August 1995	2026	2028	(Hungary) Ferencvárosi TC
15	(Denmark)	Emma Friis	Left Wing	31 October 1999	2024	2028	(Denmark) Ikast Håndbold
16	(Romania)	Denisa Șandru	Goalkeeper	27 September 1994	2026	2028	(Romania) CS Rapid Handball
18	(Faroe Islands)	Pernille Brandenborg	Line Player	29 July 1997	2026	2028	(Norway) Storhamar HE
20	(Romania)	Irina Maxim	Left Back	28 November 2005	2024		—N/a
21	(Romania)	Alexandra Szőke	Left Wing	16 February 1997	2021	2027	(Romania) HC Zalău
22	(Norway)	Kristina Novak	Right Back	29 August 2000	2025	2027	(France) Brest Bretagne Handball
34	(Montenegro)	Tatjana Brnović	Line Player	9 November 1998	2025	2027	(Slovenia) RK Krim
42	(Sweden)	Jenny Carlson	Centre Back	17 April 1995	2026	2028	(Norway) Molde Elite
48	(Hungary)	Dorottya Faluvégi	Right Wing	31 March 1998	2026	2028	(Germany) HB Ludwigsburg
53	(Romania)	Iulia Dumanska	Goalkeeper	15 August 1996	2026	2028	(Romania) Minaur Baia Mare
59	(Hungary)	Csenge Kuczora	Left Back	26 January 2000	2026	2028	(Germany) Thüringer HC
61	(Russia)	Valeriia Maslova	Right Back	23 January 2001	2025	2027	(Hungary) Ferencvárosi TC
77	(Romania)	Crina Pintea	Line Player	3 April 1990	2022	2027	(Hungary) Győri ETO KC
88	(Denmark)	Anne Mette Hansen	Left Back	25 August 1994	2025	2027	(France) Metz Handball
94	(France)	Catherine Gabriel	Goalkeeper	4 September 1994	2026	2028	(France) ESBF Besançon

=== Transfers ===
Transfers for the season 2027-28

Joining

- (Czech Republic) Sabrina Novotná (GK) (from (France) Metz Handball)?
- (France) Oriane Ondono (LP) (from (France) Brest Bretagne Handball)?

Leaving

- (Romania) Crina Pintea (LP) (retires)
- (Montenegro) Tatjana Brnović (LP) (to (Montenegro) ŽRK Budućnost)

== Personnel ==
=== Current technical staff ===
Position	Staff
Head coach	(Romania) Iulia Curea
Assistant coach	vacant
Goalkeeper coach	(Romania) Alina Iordache
Doctor	(Romania) Florin Oancea
Physiotherapist	(Romania) Veronica Năstase
Masseur	(Romania) Iulian Andrei Creangă
Athletic Trainer	(Romania) Silviu Tănase

Last updated: 10 November 2026

=== Board members ===
Office	Name
Team Manager	Aurelia Brădeanu
Operational director	Răzvan Socolovici
Competition organiser	Ionuț Bugan
Marketing communications	Marian Visu

Last updated: 4 November 2025

== Selected former players ==
- (Romania) Aurelia Brădeanu
- (Romania) Iulia Curea
- (Romania) Oana Manea
- (Romania) Cristina Neagu
- (Romania) Paula Ungureanu
- (Romania) Cristina Vărzaru
- (France) Camille Ayglon-Saurina
- (France) Siraba Dembélé
- (France) Laura Flippes
- (France) Laura Glauser
- (France) Gnonsiane Niombla
- (France) Grace Zaadi
- (Norway) Malin Aune
- (Norway) Emilie Hegh Arntzen
- (Norway) Vilde Ingstad
- (Norway) Marit Malm Frafjord
- (Norway) Amanda Kurtović
- (Norway) Nora Mørk
- (Brazil) Eduarda Amorim
- (Brazil) Fernanda da Silva
- (Brazil) Deonise Fachinello
- (Brazil) Mayssa Pessoa
- (Brazil) Ana Paula Rodrigues
- (Brazil) Gabriela Moreschi
- (Sweden) Isabelle Gulldén
- (Sweden) Nathalie Hagman
- (Sweden) Sabina Jacobsen
- (Sweden) Linnea Torstensson
- (Sweden) Evelina Eriksson
- (Denmark) Maria Fisker
- (Denmark) Line Jørgensen
- (Denmark) Trine Østergaard
- (Montenegro) Majda Mehmedović
- (Montenegro) Jovanka Radičević
- (Montenegro) Đurđina Jauković
- (Slovenia) Elizabeth Omoregie
- (Serbia) Dragana Cvijić
- (Serbia) Andrea Lekić
- (Netherlands) Yvette Broch
- (Netherlands) Tess Wester
- (Netherlands) Inger Smits
- (Netherlands) Merel Freriks
- (Spain) Alexandrina Cabral Barbosa
- (Spain) Carmen Martín
- (Spain) Jennifer Gutiérrez Bermejo
- (Russia) Marina Sudakova
- (Russia) Ekaterina Vetkova
- (Germany) Alina Grijseels
- (Croatia) Jelena Grubišić
- (Ukraine) Iryna Glibko

=== Retired numbers ===
No.	Player	Position	Tenure
8	(Romania) Cristina Neagu	Left Back	2017–2025

== Kit manufacturers and shirt sponsors ==
Season	Kit manufacturer	Brands
2015–2016	Kempa	Electromontaj / Toyota / Diangi Bak 2
2016–2017	Kempa	Electromontaj / Borsec / Diangi Bak 2
2017–2018	Kempa	Engie / Borsec / Novatik
2018–2019	Kempa	Engie / BMW / Borsec / Novatik
2019–2020	Kempa	Engie / Fiat / Borsec / Novatik
2020–2021	Kempa	Engie / Unibet / Borsec / Novatik
2020–2021	Kempa	Engie / Banca Transilvania / Unibet / Borsec / Cocomax
2021–2022	Kempa	Game World Casino / Engie / Fiterman Pharma / Borsec / Cocomax / DCNEu
2022–2023	Kempa	Game World Casino / Engie / Fiterman Pharma / Borsec / Cocomax / DCNEu / Fratelli
2023–2024	Kempa	Game World Casino / Engie / Fiterman Pharma / Borsec / Tesla
2024–	Kempa	Stanleybet / Engie / Fiterman Pharma / Borsec / Wienerberger / Tesla / BRD - Groupe Société Générale / Autonom / Polyrom

== In European competitions ==
EHF competitions
Season	Competition	Pld	W	D	L	GF	GA	Diff	Final result
2011–12	EHF Cup	4	1	0	3	104	112	-8	Round of 16
2015–16	EHF Champions League	16	10	1	5	416	387	+29	Winners
2016–17	EHF Champions League	16	10	1	5	427	407	+20	Third place
2017–18	EHF Champions League	16	10	1	5	455	395	+60	Third place
2018–19	EHF Champions League	14	6	1	7	400	380	+20	Quarter-finals
2019–20	EHF Champions League	12	7	1	4	314	288	+26	Quarter-finals
2020–21	EHF Champions League	17	9	1	7	426	411	+15	Quarter-finals
2021–22	EHF Champions League	17	8	2	7	427	395	+32	Quarter-finals
2022–23	EHF Champions League	16	10	2	4	498	451	+47	Quarter-finals
2023–24	EHF Champions League	18	10	1	7	521	470	+51	Quarter-finals
2024–25	EHF Champions League	18	12	0	6	528	484	+44	Quarter-finals
2025–26	EHF Champions League	18	12	0	6	573	513	+60	Third place
Total		182	105	11	66	5089	4693	+396	

Pld – Played; W – Won; D – Drawn; L – Lost; GF – Goals for; GA – Goals against; Diff – Difference.

=== European record ===
Season	Competition	Round	Club	Home	Away	Aggregate
2011–12	EHF Cup	Round 3	(Poland) SPR Lublin	30–25	30–32	60–57
2011–12	EHF Cup	Last 16	(Romania) HC Zalău	20–28	24–27	44–55
2015–16	Champions League; Winner	Group matches (Group D)	(Poland) SPR Lublin	33–21	30–27	2nd
2015–16	Champions League; Winner	Group matches (Group D)	(Sweden) IK Sävehof	28–17	27–22	
2015–16	Champions League; Winner	Group matches (Group D)	(Montenegro) Budućnost	22–28	23–23	
2015–16	Champions League; Winner	Main round (Group 2)	(Denmark) FC Midtjylland	24–22	28–23	4th
2015–16	Champions League; Winner	Main round (Group 2)	(North Macedonia) HC Vardar	25–30	21–22	
2015–16	Champions League; Winner	Main round (Group 2)	(Hungary) Győri Audi ETO KC	22–24	22–28	
2015–16	Champions League; Winner	Quarter-finals	(Russia) Rostov-Don	26–25	29–28	55–53
2015–16	Champions League; Winner	Semi-finals	(North Macedonia) HC Vardar	27–21	—	27–21
2015–16	Champions League; Winner	Final	(Hungary) Győri Audi ETO KC	29–26 after extra time	—	29–26
2016–17	Champions League; Third place	Group matches (Group C)	(Russia) Rostov-Don	24–21	22–20	2nd
2016–17	Champions League; Third place	Group matches (Group C)	(Denmark) FC Midtjylland	26–20	21–24	
2016–17	Champions League; Third place	Group matches (Group C)	(Hungary) Győri Audi ETO KC	24–27	25–33	
2016–17	Champions League; Third place	Main round (Group 2)	(Norway) Larvik HK	26–26	33–35	3rd
2016–17	Champions League; Third place	Main round (Group 2)	(Denmark) Team Esbjerg	33–25	25–20	
2016–17	Champions League; Third place	Main round (Group 2)	(Slovenia) RK Krim Mercator	24–21	28–26	
2016–17	Champions League; Third place	Quarter-finals	(Hungary) FTC-Rail Cargo Hungaria	30–25	27–26	57–51
2016–17	Champions League; Third place	Semi-finals	(North Macedonia) HC Vardar	33–38	—	33–38
2016–17	Champions League; Third place	Third place	(Montenegro) Budućnost	26–20	—	26–20
2017–18	Champions League; Third place	Group matches (Group A)	(Slovenia) RK Krim Mercator	30–18	33–30	1st
2017–18	Champions League; Third place	Group matches (Group A)	(Poland) Vistal Gdynia	34–22	34–23	
2017–18	Champions League; Third place	Group matches (Group A)	(Denmark) Nykøbing Falster	39–26	22–25	
2017–18	Champions League; Third place	Main round (Group 1)	(Hungary) Győri Audi ETO KC	28–22	24–28	3rd
2017–18	Champions League; Third place	Main round (Group 1)	(Denmark) FC Midtjylland	29–24	31–26	
2017–18	Champions League; Third place	Main round (Group 1)	(Russia) Rostov-Don	22–22	24–25	
2017–18	Champions League; Third place	Quarter-finals	(France) Metz Handball	34–21	20–27	54–48
2017–18	Champions League; Third place	Semi-finals	(Hungary) Győri Audi ETO KC	20–26	—	20–26
2017–18	Champions League; Third place	Third place	(Russia) Rostov-Don	31–30	—	31–30
2018–19	Champions League	Group matches (Group D)	(Hungary) FTC-Rail Cargo Hungaria	36–31	34–28	1st
2018–19	Champions League	Group matches (Group D)	(Germany) SG BBM Bietigheim	32–24	28–30	
2018–19	Champions League	Group matches (Group D)	(Norway) Vipers Kristiansand	26–31	29–27	
2018–19	Champions League	Main round (Group 2)	(Hungary) Győri Audi ETO KC	25–27	27–36	4th
2018–19	Champions League	Main round (Group 2)	(Slovenia) RK Krim Mercator	32–26	22–23	
2018–19	Champions League	Main round (Group 2)	(Germany) Thüringer HC	23–23	38–30	
2018–19	Champions League	Quarter-finals	(France) Metz Handball	26–31	22–23	48–54
2019–20	Champions League	Group matches	(Norway) Vipers Kristiansand	22–27	25–23	
2019–20	Champions League	Group matches	(Poland) MKS Perła Lublin	35–19	28–19	
2019–20	Champions League	Group matches	(Hungary) FTC-Rail Cargo Hungaria	33–33	23–31	
2019–20	Champions League	Main round	(France) Metz Handball	32–27	23–28	
2019–20	Champions League	Main round	(Russia) Rostov-Don	23–23	20–23	
2019–20	Champions League	Main round	(Denmark) Team Esbjerg	24–22	30–25	
2019–20	Champions League	Quarter-finals	(Hungary) Győri Audi ETO KC	Cancelled	Cancelled	Cancelled
2020–21	Champions League	Group phase (Group A)	(France) Metz Handball	31–26	22–25	3rd
2020–21	Champions League	Group phase (Group A)	(Russia) Rostov-Don	22–27	10–0	
2020–21	Champions League	Group phase (Group A)	(Norway) Vipers Kristiansand	22–29	25–30	
2020–21	Champions League	Group phase (Group A)	(Denmark) Team Esbjerg	28–26	30–29	
2020–21	Champions League	Group phase (Group A)	(Hungary) FTC-Rail Cargo Hungaria	25–19	27–31	
2020–21	Champions League	Group phase (Group A)	(Germany) SG BBM Bietigheim	10–0	32–22	
2020–21	Champions League	Group phase (Group A)	(Slovenia) RK Krim Mercator	22–22	25–23	
2020–21	Champions League	Play-offs	(Romania) SCM Râmnicu Vâlcea	21–27	33–24	54–51
2020–21	Champions League	Quarter-finals	(Russia) CSKA Moscow	32–27	19–24	51–51 (a)
2021–22	Champions League	Group phase (Group A)	(France) Brest Bretagne Handball	29–30	21–24	5th
2021–22	Champions League	Group phase (Group A)	(Hungary) FTC-Rail Cargo Hungaria	27–21	30–31	
2021–22	Champions League	Group phase (Group A)	(Montenegro) Budućnost BEMAX	30–22	28–20	
2021–22	Champions League	Group phase (Group A)	(Germany) BV Borussia Dortmund	33–29	25–22	
2021–22	Champions League	Group phase (Group A)	(Russia) Rostov-Don	27–30	0–10	
2021–22	Champions League	Group phase (Group A)	(Denmark) Team Esbjerg	29–29	21–22	
2021–22	Champions League	Group phase (Group A)	(Croatia) HC Podravka Vegeta	29–21	36–31	
2021–22	Champions League	Play-offs	(Russia) CSKA Moscow	10–0	10–0	20–0
2021–22	Champions League	Quarter-finals	(Denmark) Team Esbjerg	25–26	27–27	52–53
2022–23	Champions League	Group phase (Group A)	(Denmark) Odense Håndbold	40–31	31–27	2nd
2022–23	Champions League	Group phase (Group A)	(Norway) Vipers Kristiansand	27–24	29–35	
2022–23	Champions League	Group phase (Group A)	(Slovenia) RK Krim Mercator	30–28	26–28	
2022–23	Champions League	Group phase (Group A)	(Germany) SG BBM Bietigheim	28–28	27–25	
2022–23	Champions League	Group phase (Group A)	(France) Brest Bretagne Handball	30–30	33–26	
2022–23	Champions League	Group phase (Group A)	(Hungary) FTC-Rail Cargo Hungaria	30–24	33–29	
2022–23	Champions League	Group phase (Group A)	(Czech Republic) DHK Baník Most	40–25	35–26	
2022–23	Champions League	Quarter-finals	(Denmark) Team Esbjerg	31–33	28–32	59–65
2023–24	Champions League	Group phase (Group A)	(Hungary) Győri Audi ETO KC	23–27	26–24	3rd
2023–24	Champions League	Group phase (Group A)	(Sweden) IK Sävehof	35–26	41–26	
2023–24	Champions League	Group phase (Group A)	(Denmark) Odense Håndbold	28–24	25–29	
2023–24	Champions League	Group phase (Group A)	(France) Brest Bretagne Handball	28–30	21–24	
2023–24	Champions League	Group phase (Group A)	(Germany) SG BBM Bietigheim	31–28	24–26	
2023–24	Champions League	Group phase (Group A)	(Montenegro) Budućnost BEMAX	44–26	29–24	
2023–24	Champions League	Group phase (Group A)	(Hungary) DVSC Schaeffler	29–29	30–23	
2023–24	Champions League	Play-offs	(Slovenia) Krim Mercator Ljubljana	30–24	30–24	60–48
2023–24	Champions League	Quarter-finals	(France) Metz Handball	24–27	23–29	47–56
2024–25	Champions League	Group phase (Group A)	(France) Metz Handball	31–32	24–27	3rd
2024–25	Champions League	Group phase (Group A)	(Hungary) FTC-Rail Cargo Hungaria	26–28	28–31	
2024–25	Champions League	Group phase (Group A)	(Slovenia) Krim Mercator Ljubljana	36–23	31–29	
2024–25	Champions League	Group phase (Group A)	(Norway) Storhamar HE	32–28	32–21	
2024–25	Champions League	Group phase (Group A)	(Denmark) Nykøbing Falster	27–26	29–27	
2024–25	Champions League	Group phase (Group A)	(Croatia) HC Podravka Vegeta	31–30	29–28	
2024–25	Champions League	Group phase (Group A)	(Romania) Gloria Bistrița-Năsăud	32–23	26–30	
2024–25	Champions League	Play-offs	(Romania) CS Rapid București	28–22	34–24	62–46
2024–25	Champions League	Quarter-finals	(Denmark) Team Esbjerg	30–29	22–26	52–55
2025–26	Champions League; Third place	Group phase (Group B)	(Norway) Sola Håndballklubb	34–31	38–30	2nd
2025–26	Champions League; Third place	Group phase (Group B)	(Denmark) Odense Håndbold	30–36	33–24	
2025–26	Champions League; Third place	Group phase (Group B)	(France) Brest Bretagne Handball	40–34	31–34	
2025–26	Champions League; Third place	Group phase (Group B)	(Hungary) FTC-Rail Cargo Hungaria	31–28	35–30	
2025–26	Champions League; Third place	Group phase (Group B)	(Slovenia) Krim OTP Group Mercator	26–20	27–31	
2025–26	Champions League; Third place	Group phase (Group B)	(Croatia) HC Podravka	34–24	33–28	
2025–26	Champions League; Third place	Group phase (Group B)	(Denmark) Ikast Håndbold	33–24	27–28	
2025–26	Champions League; Third place	Quarter-finals	(Denmark) Team Esbjerg	37–27	25–26	62–53
2025–26	Champions League; Third place	Semi-finals	(France) Metz Handball	27–32	—	27–32
2025–26	Champions League; Third place	Third place	(France) Brest Bretagne Handball	32–26	—	32–26
2026–27	Champions League	Group phase (Group A)	(Denmark) Team Esbjerg	—	—	—
2026–27	Champions League	Group phase (Group A)	(Hungary) FTC-Toyota Kovács	—	—	—
2026–27	Champions League	Group phase (Group A)	(France) Brest Bretagne Handball	—	—	—
2026–27	Champions League	Group phase (Group A)	(Slovenia) RK Krim OTP Group Mercator	—	—	—
2026–27	Champions League	Group phase (Group A)	(Germany) BV Borussia Dortmund	—	—	—
2026–27	Champions League	Group phase (Group A)	(Norway) Sola Håndballklubb	—	—	—
2026–27	Champions League	Group phase (Group A)	(Montenegro) OTP Group Budućnost	—	—	

== In European competitions ==
EHF competitions
Season	Competition	Round / Result	Pld	W	D	L	GF	GA	Diff
2011–12	EHF Cup	Last 16	4	1	0	3	104	112	-8
2012–13	—	Did not participate	—	—	—	—	—	—	—
2013–14	—	Did not participate	—	—	—	—	—	—	—
2014–15	—	Did not participate	—	—	—	—	—	—	—
2015–16	EHF Champions League	Winner	16	10	1	5	416	387	+29
2016–17	EHF Champions League	Third place	16	10	1	5	427	407	+20
2017–18	EHF Champions League	Third place	16	10	1	5	455	395	+60
2018–19	EHF Champions League	Quarter-finals	14	6	1	7	400	390	+10
2019–20	EHF Champions League	Main round	12	7	1	4	314	288	+26
2020–21	EHF Champions League	Quarter-finals	17	8	1	8	423	411	+12
2021–22	EHF Champions League	Quarter-finals	17	8	2	7	427	395	+32
2022–23	EHF Champions League	Quarter-finals	16	10	2	4	498	451	+47
2023–24	EHF Champions League	Quarter-finals	18	10	1	7	521	470	+51
2024–25	EHF Champions League	Quarter-finals	18	12	0	6	528	484	+44
2025–26	EHF Champions League	Third place	18	12	0	6	573	509	+64
2026–27	EHF Champions League	Group phase	—	—	—	—	—	—	—
Total			182	104	11	67	5086	4699	+387

Pld – Played; W – Won; D – Drawn; L – Lost; GF – Goals for; GA – Goals against; Diff – Difference.

== Domestic competitions ==
League										Romanian Cup	Romanian Supercup
Season	Division	Pos	Pld	W	D	L	GF	GA	Diff	Romanian Cup	Romanian Supercup
2011–2012	Liga Națională	7th	26	12	1	13	730	749	-19		
2012–2013	Liga Națională	8th	20	8	0	12	525	533	-8		
2013–2014	Liga Națională	7th	22	11	1	10	531	538	-7		
2014–2015	Liga Națională	First place	26	24	0	2	771	553	+218	Finalist	Finalist
2015–2016	Liga Națională	First place	26	25	0	1	816	584	+232	Winner	Winner
2016–2017	Liga Națională	First place	22	21	0	1	680	478	+202	Winner	Winner
2017–2018	Liga Națională	First place	26	25	0	1	821	573	+248	Winner	Finalist
2018–2019	Liga Națională	Second place	24	22	0	2	708	565	+143	Winner	Winner
2019–2020	Liga Națională	Second place	17	14	1	2	467	386	+81	Finalist	Finalist
2020–2021	Liga Națională	First place	28	26	1	1	839	625	+214	Finalist	Finalist
2021–2022	Liga Națională	Second place	26	22	2	2	769	622	+147	Winner	Winner
2022–2023	Liga Națională	First place	26	25	1	0	844	658	+186	Winner	Winner
2023–2024	Liga Națională	First place	26	24	1	1	887	669	+218	Winner	Winner
2024–2025	Liga Națională	First place	24	21	1	2	737	615	+122	Winner	Winner
2025–2026	Liga Națională	Second place	22	20	1	1	713	580	+133		Winner
Total			361	300	10	51	10838	8728	+2110		

Pos – Position; Pld – Played; W – Won; D – Drawn; L – Lost; GF – Goals for; GA – Goals against; Diff – Difference.

== Coaches ==
Period	Coaches
June 2007 — February 2014	(Romania) Vasile Mărgulescu
February 2014 — February 2014	(Romania) Lucian Ghiulai
February 2014 — September 2015	(Denmark) Mette Klit
September 2015 — May 2016	(Denmark) Kim Rasmussen
May 2016 — November 2016	(Denmark) Jakob Vestergaard
November 2016 — April 2017	(Romania) Aurelian Roșca
April 2017 — June 2017	(Sweden) Per Johansson
June 2017 — March 2018	(Denmark) Helle Thomsen
March 2018 — May 2018	(Sweden) Per Johansson
July 2018 — October 2018	(Sweden) Magnus Johansson
October 2018 — May 2019	(Serbia) Dragan Đukić
July 2019 — October 2019	(Sweden) Tomas Ryde
October 2019 — June 2024	(Romania) Adrian Vasile
July 2024 — June 2025	(Denmark) Helle Thomsen
July 2025 — November 2025	(Romania) Adrian Vasile
November 2025 — November 2025	(Romania) Iulia Curea
December 2025 — November 2026	(Montenegro) Bojana Popović
November 2026 — present	(Romania) Iulia Curea

== See also ==
- CSM București
- CSM București (men's handball)
- CSM București (women's volleyball)
- CSM București (rugby)
- Universitatea Știința București
- Rapid București
- Romania women's national handball team
