= Dragana Cvijić =

Serbian handball player (born 1990)

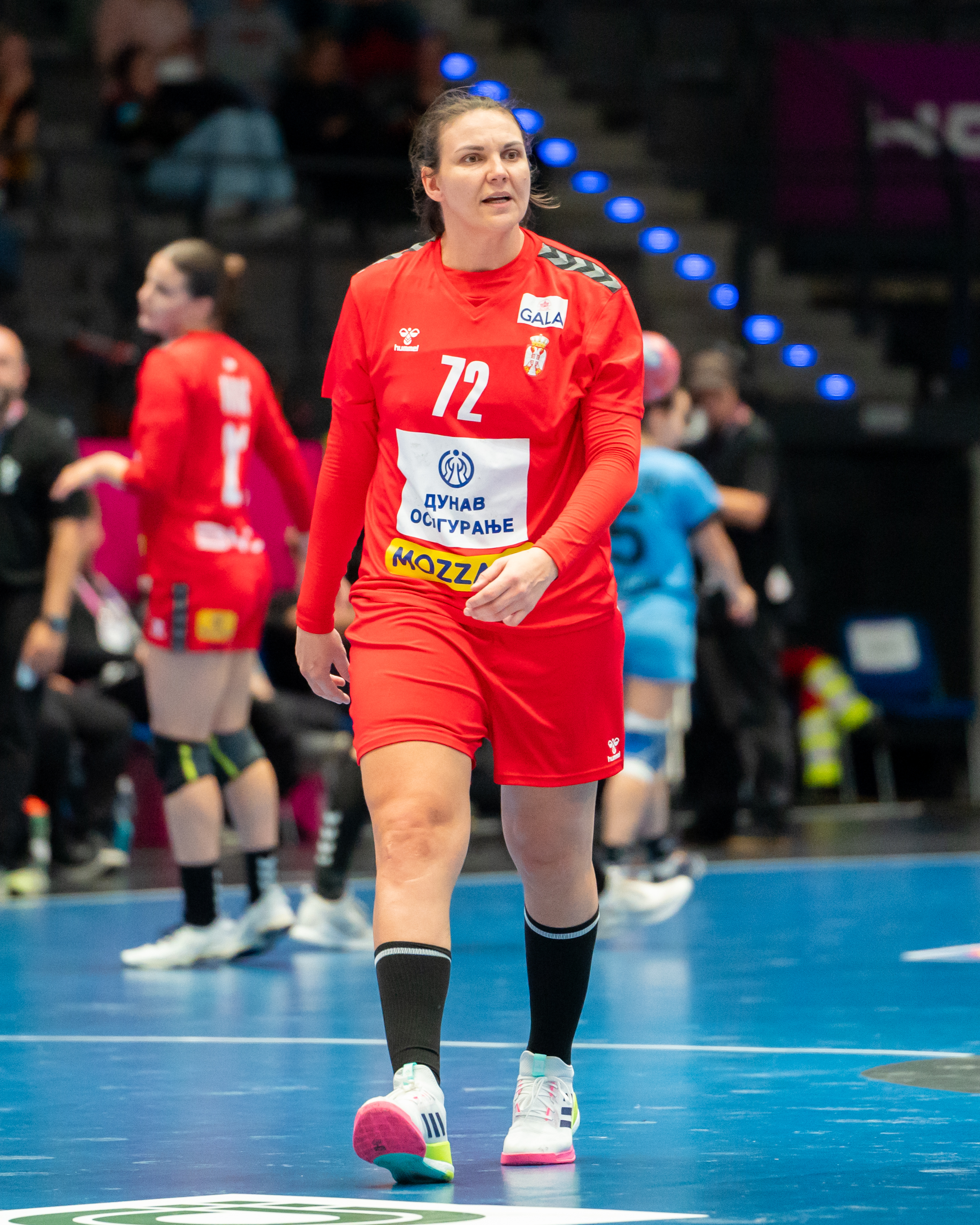

Personal information
- Nationality: Serbian
- Born: 15 March 1990 (age 36) Belgrade, SR Serbia, SFR Yugoslavia
- Height: 1.83 m (6 ft 0 in)

Sport
- Sport: Handball
- Position: Pivot

Senior clubs
- Years: Team
- 2007–2009: ŽRK Crvena zvezda
- 2009–2011: RK Krim
- 2011–2017: ŽRK Budućnost
- 2017–2018: ŽRK Vardar
- 2018–2021: CSM București
- 2021: RK Krim
- 2021–2022: CSKA Moscow
- 2022–2026: Ferencvárosi TC
National team
Years	Team	Apps	(Gls)
–	Serbia	110	(333)
Medal record
World Championship
Silver medal – second place	2013 Serbia	Team
Mediterranean Games
Gold medal – first place	2013 Mersin	Team
- Updated on 5 November 2025

Dragana Cvijić (Serbian Cyrillic: Драгана Цвијић; born 15 March 1990) is a former Serbian handball player for the Serbian national team.

== International honours ==
- EHF Champions League:
  - Winner: 2012, 2015
  - Finalist: 2023
- World Championship:
  - Finalist: 2013

== Individual awards ==
- Balkan-Handball.com Serbian Handballer of the Year: 2015, 2018
- All-Star Pivot of the World Championship: 2013
- All-Star Pivot of the EHF Champions League: 2018
- Team of the Tournament Pivot of the Bucharest Trophy: 2014, 2015
