= Iulia Dumanska =

Romanian handball player (born 1996)

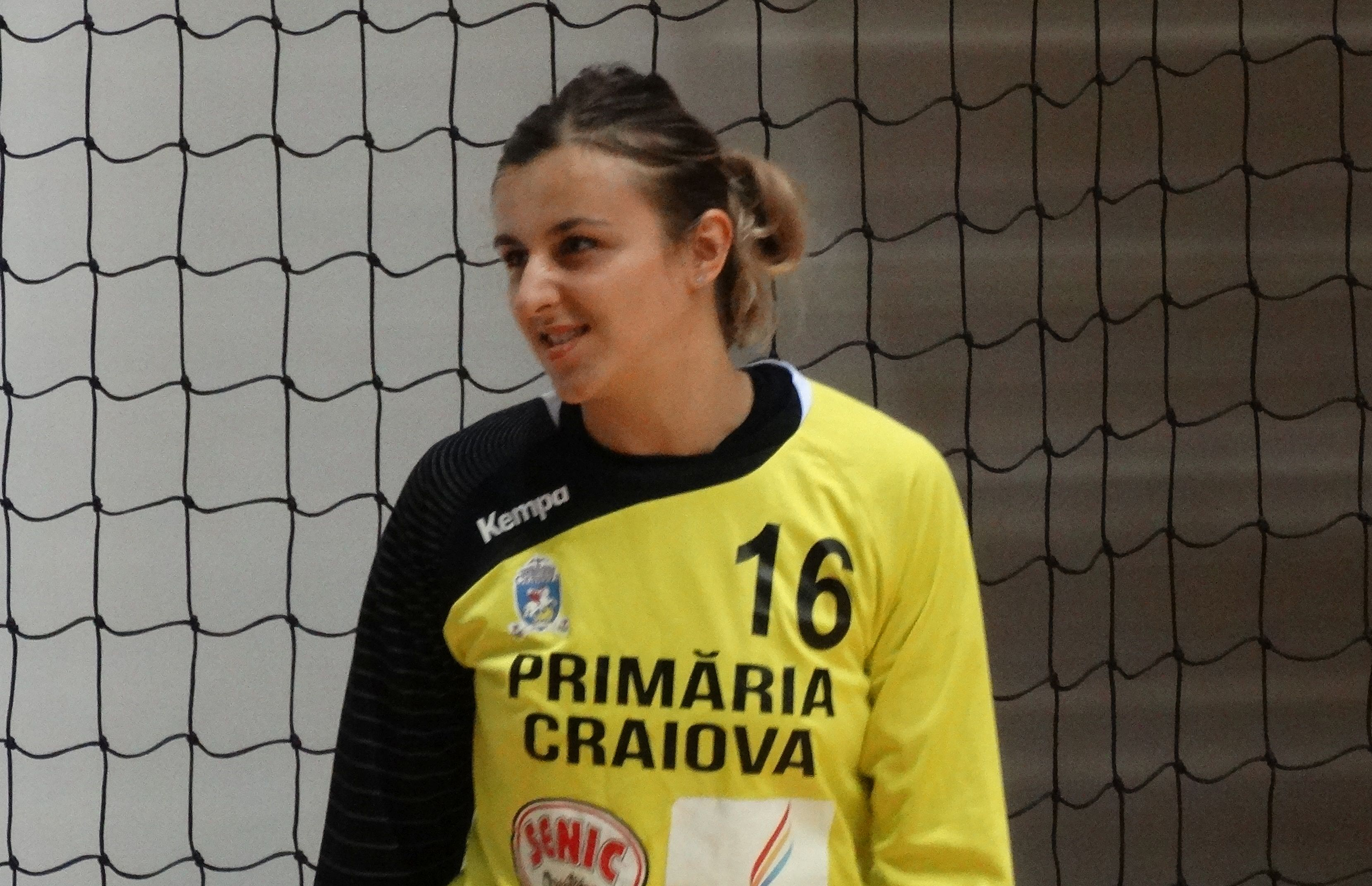
- Dumanska in 2016

Personal information
- Nationality: Romanian
- Born: 15 August 1996 (age 30) Horodenka, Ukraine
- Height: 1.78 m (5 ft 10 in)

Sport
- Sport: Handball
- Position: Goalkeeper
- Current club: CSM București
- Number: 53

Youth career
- Years: Team
- 2007–2011: HC Bolena Horodenka
- 2011–2012: Marta Baia Mare
- 2012–2013: HCM 2 Baia Mare

Senior clubs
- Years: Team
- 2013–2014: → Neptun Constanța (loan)
- 2014–2016: HCM Baia Mare
- 2016–2018: SCM Craiova
- 2018–2020: SCM Râmnicu Vâlcea
- 2020–2022: RK Podravka Koprivnica
- 2022–2024: Gloria Bistrița
- 2024–2026: Minaur Baia Mare
- 2026–: CSM București
National team
Years	Team	Apps	(Gls)
2016–	Romania	72	(0)
Medal record
Junior World Championship
Bronze medal – third place	2016 Russia
- Updated on ntupdate

Iulia Dumanska (born 15 August 1996) is a Romanian professional handballer who plays as a goalkeeper for CSM București and the Romanian national team.

== Early life ==
Born in a family of athletes, Dumanska started playing handball at the age of 11 in her hometown of Horodenka, Ukraine. Three years later she was discovered by the Martas and signed with their club Marta Baia Mare. She later graduated from high school from Anghel Saligny High School in Baia Mare. Iulia now lives in Romania where she became Romanian citizen on 5 May 2016.

== Trophies ==
- Liga Națională:
  - Winner: 2019
- Cupa României:
  - Winner: 2015
- Supercupa României:
  - Winner: 2014, 2015, 2018
- EHF Cup:
  - Winner: 2018

== Individual awards ==
- Handball-Planet.com Young World Player of the Season: 2018
- Handball-Planet.com Young World Goalkeeper of the Season: 2018
- Prosport Liga Națională Goalkeeper of the Season: 2018
- Gala Premiilor Handbalului Românesc Liga Națională Goalkeeper of the Season: 2019
- Gala Premiilor Handbalului Românesc Liga Națională Most Valuable Player Award: 2019

== Personal life ==
Dumanska speaks fluent Romanian and proudly sings the national anthem of Romania. She was given the award of Cetățean de onoare ("Honorary Citizen") of the city of Craiova in 2018.
