= Aurelia Brădeanu =

Romanian handball player (born 1979)

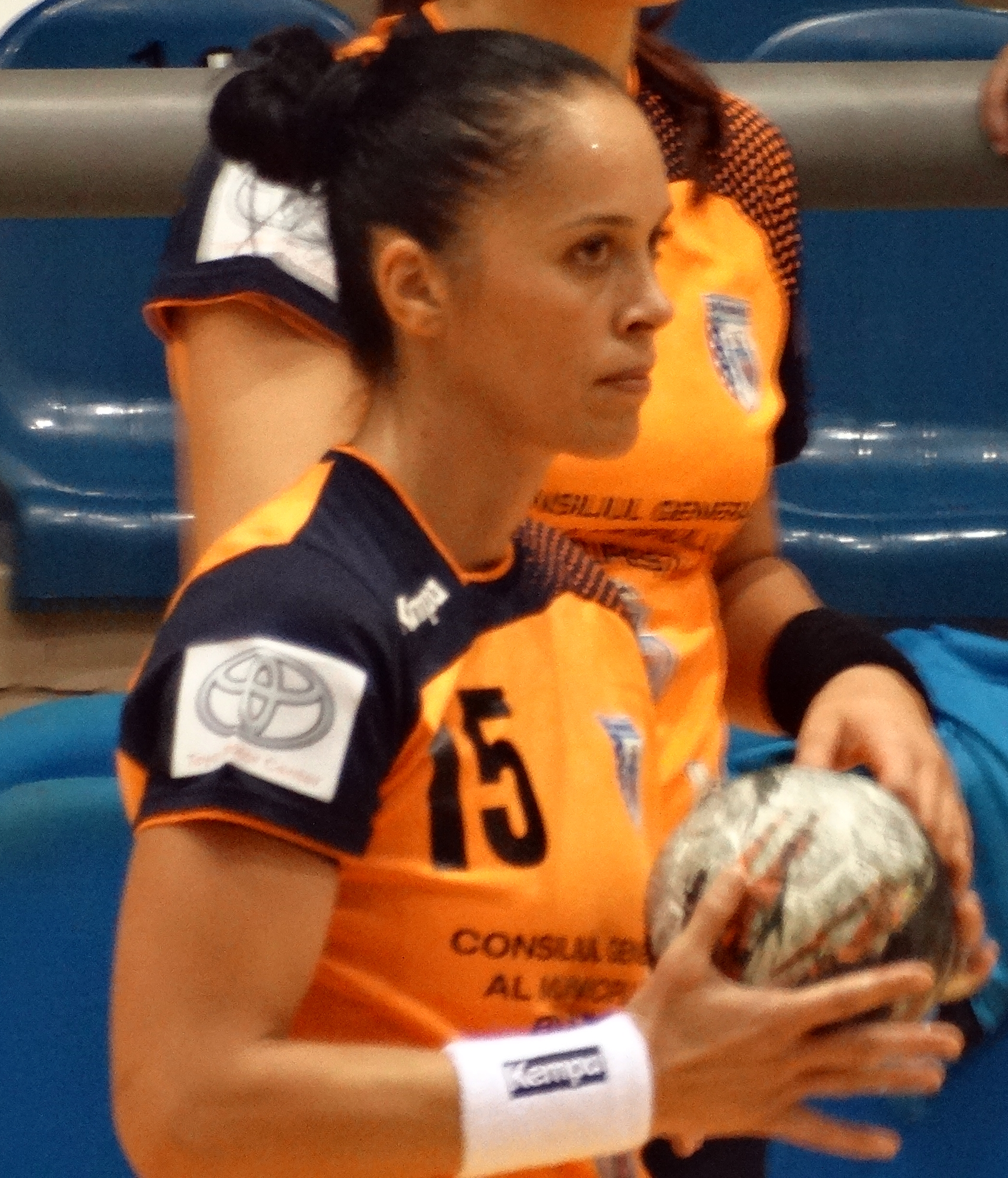
- Brădeanu with CSM

Personal information
- Nationality: Romanian
- Born: 5 May 1979 (age 47) Slatina, Romania
- Height: 1.80 m (5 ft 11 in)

Sport
- Sport: Handball
- Position: Centre Back
- Current club: Retired

Senior clubs
- Years: Team
- –2002: CS Oltchim Vâlcea
- 2002–2004: CS Rapid București
- 2004–2011: Győri ETO KC
- 2011–2013: CS Oltchim Vâlcea
- 2013–2015: ASC Corona Brașov
- 2015–2017: CSM Bucharest
National team
Years	Team	Apps	(Gls)
1995–2016	Romania	268	(682)
Medal record
Youth European Championship
Gold medal – first place	1998 Slovakia	Team
Youth World Championship
Gold medal – first place	1999 China	Team
World Championship
Silver medal – second place	2005 Russia	Team
Bronze medal – third place	2015 Denmark	Team
European Championship
Bronze medal – third place	2010 Denmark/Norway	Team

Aurelia Brădeanu (née Stoica; born 5 May 1979) is a Romanian handballer who last played for CSM Bucharest. She participated at the 2000 Summer Olympics in Sydney, at the 2008 Summer Olympics in Beijing and at the 2016 Summer Olympics in Rio de Janeiro. She is among the top 10 all-time league goalscorers of Győri ETO KC, with 656 goals in 155 appearances. Brădeanu was the captain of Romania and retired from the national team on 27 November 2016.

== International honours ==
=== Club ===
- EHF Champions League:
  - Winner: 2016
  - Silver Medalist: 2009
  - Bronze Medalist: 2017
- EHF Cup:
  - Finalist: 2005
- EHF Cup Winners' Cup:
  - Finalist: 2006
  - Semifinalist: 2002

=== National team ===
- Youth World Championship:
  - Gold Medalist: 1999
- Youth European Championship:
  - Gold Medalist: 1998
- European Championship:
  - Bronze Medalist: 2010
  - Fourth Place: 2000
- World Championship:
  - Silver Medalist: 2005
  - Bronze Medalist: 2015
  - Fourth Place: 1999, 2007

== Individual awards ==
- Romanian Handballer of the Year: 2003, 2013

== Gallery ==
Other photos

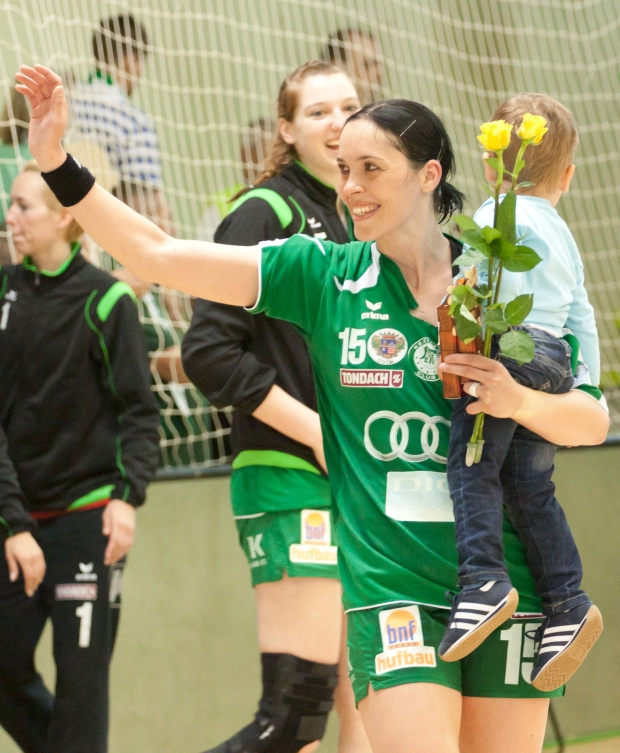

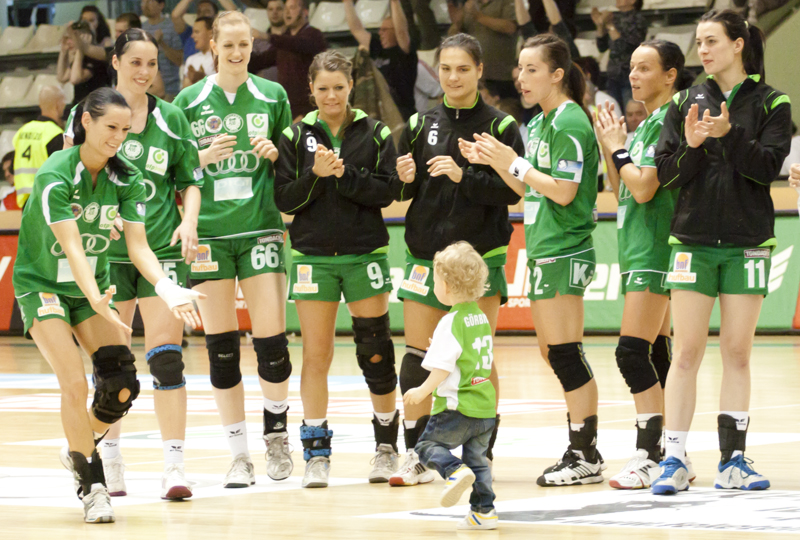

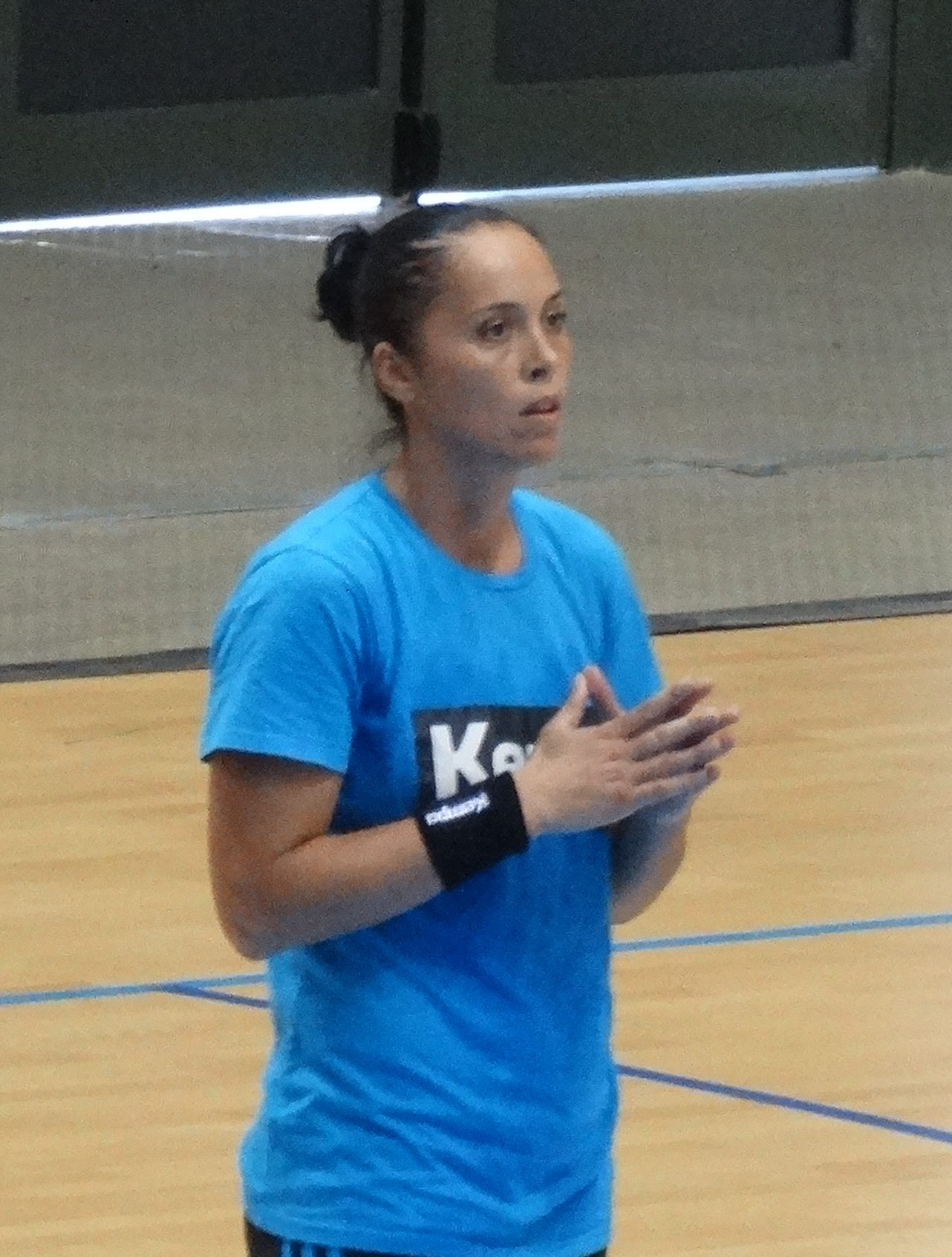

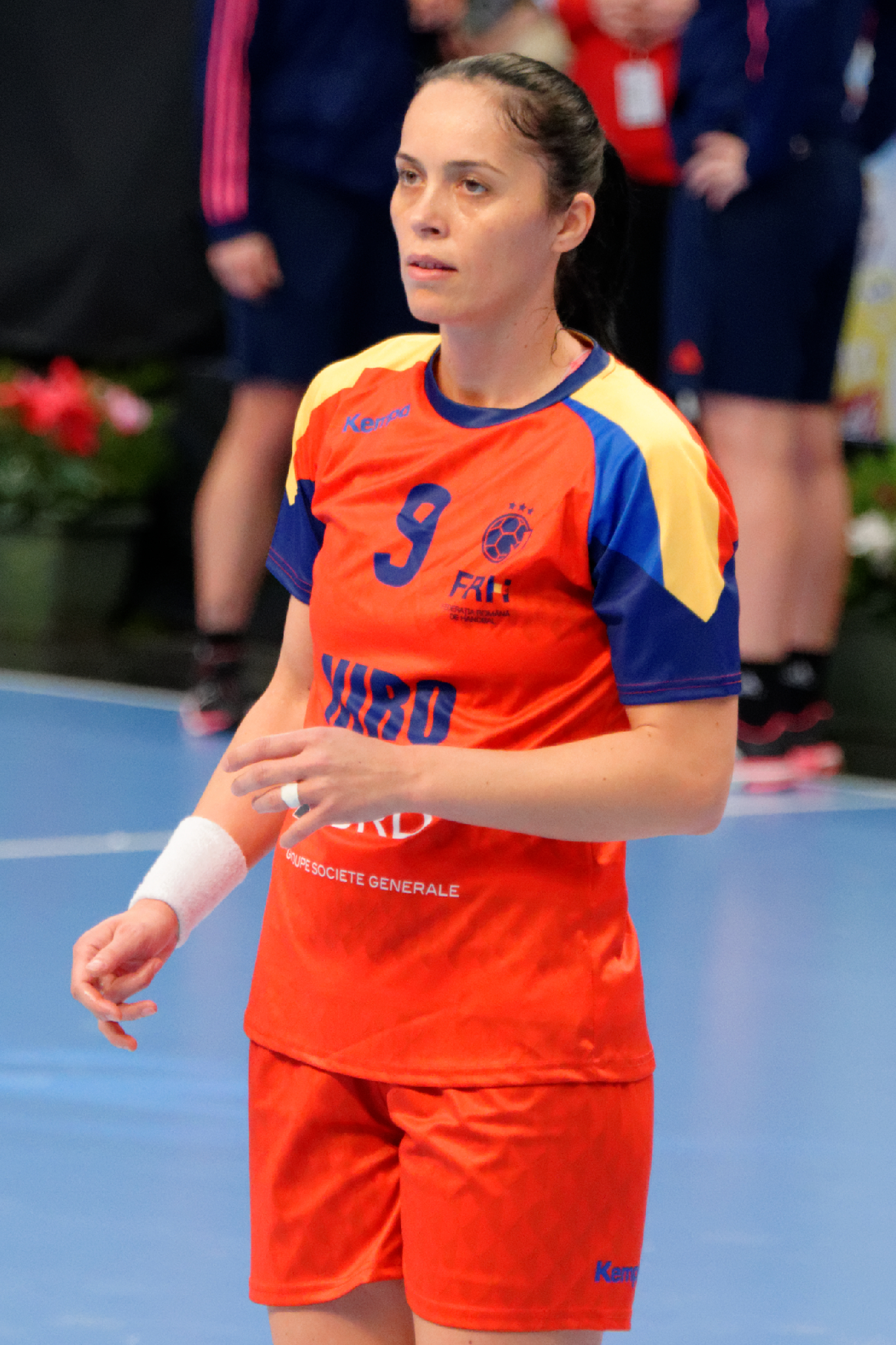

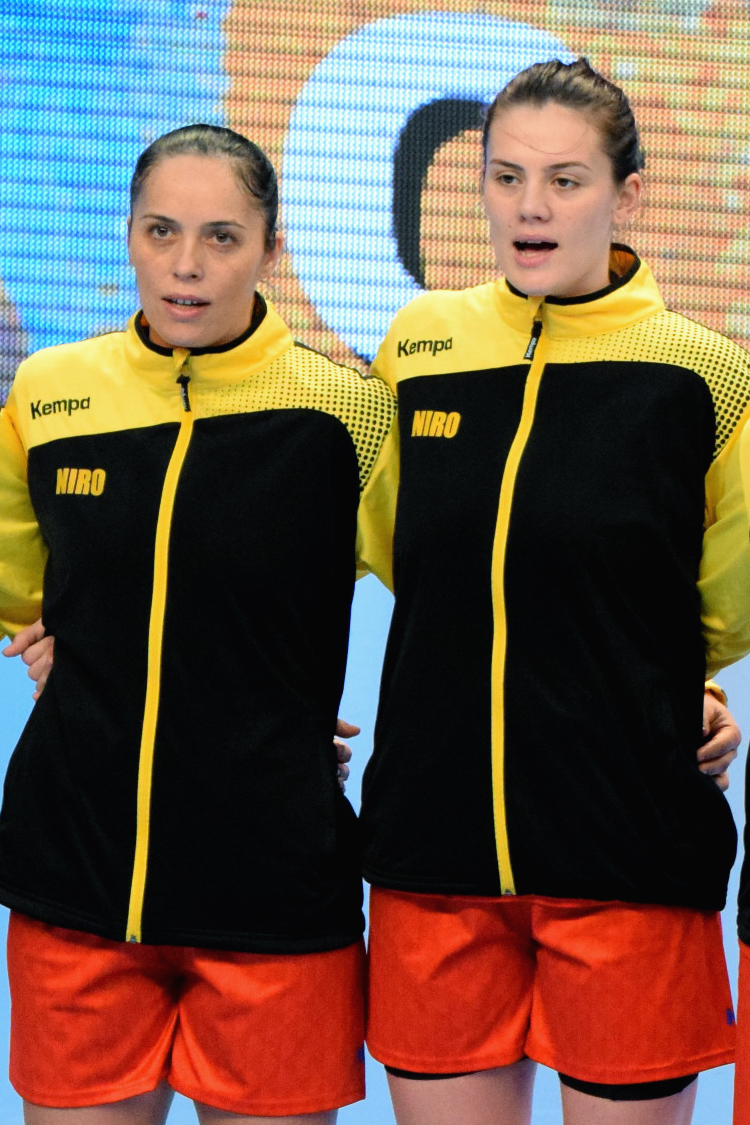
