= Radmila Miljanić-Petrović =

Montenegrin handball player (born 1988)

Radmila Miljanić Petrović
Personal information
- Nationality: Montenegrin
- Born: 19 April 1988 (age 38) Nikšić, SR Montenegro, SFR Yugoslavia
- Height: 1.74 m (5 ft 9 in)

Sport
- Sport: Handball
- Position: Right wing
National team
| Years | Team | Apps | (Gls) |
| 2006-2016 | Montenegro | 132 | (189) |
Medal record
Olympic Games
| Silver medal – second place | 2012 London | Team |
European Championship
| Gold medal – first place | 2012 Serbia | Team |
Mediterranean Games
| Bronze medal – third place | 2009 Pescara | Team |

Radmila Petrović née Miljanić, (born 19 April 1988) is a retired Montenegrin handball player. She played for ŽRK Nikšić and ŽRK Budućnost Podgorica and the Montenegrin national team, and participated at the 2011 World Women's Handball Championship in Brazil and at the 2012 Summer Olympics, where Montenegro won silver. She won the Champions League in 2012 and 2015.

She was part of the Montenegrin team that won their first ever international title at the 2012 European Women's Handball Championship.

== Individual awards ==
- Team of the Tournament Right Wing of the Bucharest Trophy: 2014
