= Iulia Curea =

Romanian female handballer (born 1982)

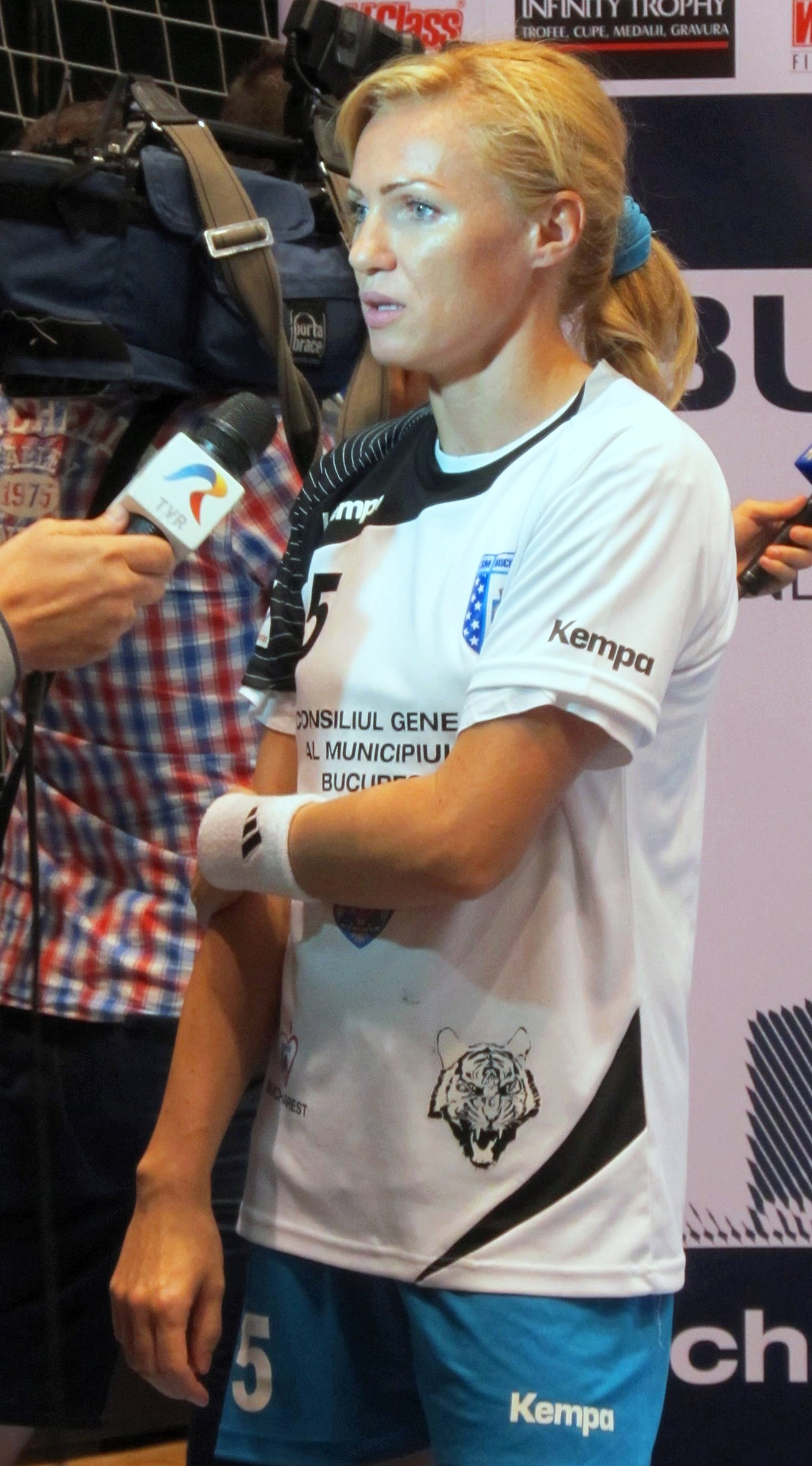

Personal information
- Full name: Iulia Vasilica Curea
- Nationality: Romanian
- Born: 8 April 1982 (age 44) Bacău, Romania
- Height: 1.72 m (5 ft 8 in)

Sport
- Sport: Handball
- Position: Left wing
- Current club: CSM București (head coach)

Senior clubs
- Years: Team
- –2002: Știința Bacău
- 2002–2006: HCF Piatra Neamț
- 2006–2013: Oltchim Râmnicu Vâlcea
- 2014–2020: CSM București
National team
Years	Team	Apps	(Gls)
2005–2012	Romania	93	(226)

Teams managed
- 2024-: CSM București (Coach)

Iulia Vasilica Curea (née Puşcaşu; born 8 April 1982, in Bacău) is a Romanian female handballer who played for the Romania national team. She is currently the head coach of CSM București.

She was given the award of Cetățean de onoare ("Honorary Citizen") of the city of Bucharest in 2016.

== International honours ==
- EHF Champions League:
  - Winner: 2016
  - Silver Medalist: 2010
  - Bronze Medalist: 2017, 2018
- EHF Champions Trophy:
  - Winner: 2007
- EHF Cup Winners' Cup:
  - Winner: 2007

== Individual awards ==
- Prosport Best Left Wing of the Romanian Liga Națională: 2018
