= Alexandra Dindiligan =

Romanian handball player (born 1997)

Alexandra Szőke
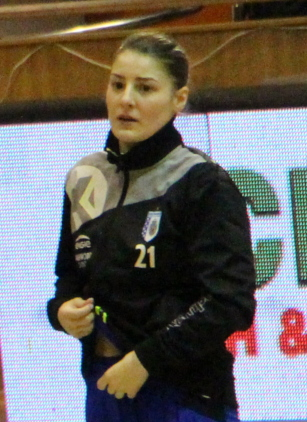

Personal information
- Nationality: Romanian
- Born: 16 February 1997 (age 29) Galați, Romania
- Height: 1.74 m (5 ft 9 in)

Sport
- Sport: Handball
- Position: Left wing
- Current club: CSM București
- Number: 21

Senior clubs
- Years: Team
- 2015–2020: Universitatea Cluj-Napoca
- 2020–2021: HC Zalău
- 2021–: CSM București
National team
Years	Team	Apps	(Gls)
2020–	Romania	5	(13)
Medal record
Junior World Championship
Bronze medal – third place	2016 Russia
Youth World Championship
Gold medal – first place	2014 Macedonia

Alexandra Szőke (born 16 February 1997, née Dindiligan) is a Romanian handball player who plays as a left wing for CSM București and the Romanian national team.

She represented Romania at the 2020 European Women's Handball Championship.

== International honours ==
- Youth World Championship:
  - Gold Medalist: 2014
- Junior World Championship:
  - Bronze Medalist: 2016
