= Yelena Zgardan =

Russian handball player

Yelena Zgardan (nee Avdekova)
Personal information
- Nationality: Russian
- Born: 7 January 1989 (age 37) Novokuznetsk, Russia
- Height: 1.80 m (5 ft 11 in)

Sport
- Sport: Handball
- Position: Left wing
- Current club: Kisvárdai KC
- Number: 9
National team
Years	Team	Apps	(Gls)
–	Russia	9	(10)
- Updated on 4 December 2012

Yelena Valerievna Zgardan (Russian: Елена Валерьевна Згардан, née Avdekova (Авдекова); born 7 January 1989) was a Russian handball player for Kisvárdai KC and the Russian national team.

== Individual awards ==
- Team of the Tournament Left Wing of the Bucharest Trophy: 2015
