= Jelena Grubišić =

Croatian handball player (born 1987)

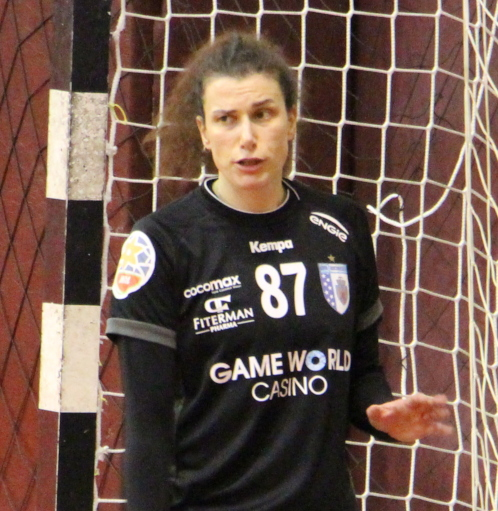

Personal information
- Nationality: Croatian
- Born: 20 January 1987 (age 39) Zagreb, SR Croatia, SFR Yugoslavia
- Height: 1.84 m (6 ft 0 in)

Sport
- Sport: Handball
- Position: Goalkeeper
- Current club: CSM București
- Number: 87

Senior clubs
- Years: Team
- 2002–2009: Lokomotiva Zagreb
- 2009–2014: Krim Ljubljana
- 2014–2015: Győri ETO KC
- 2015–2022: CSM București
National team
- Years: Team
- –: Croatia

Jelena Grubišić (born 20 January 1987) is a retired Croatian handballer who played for the Croatia national team.

She was given the award of Cetățean de onoare ("Honorary Citizen") of the city of Bucharest in 2016.

She was inducted in the European Handball Hall of Fame in 2023.

== International honours ==
- EHF Champions League:
  - Winner: 2016
  - Bronze Medalist: 2017, 2018

== Individual awards ==
- Most Valuable Player of the Final Four of EHF Champions League: 2016
- Croatian Female Handballer of the Year: 2016
- Balkan-Handball.com Ex-Yugoslavian Handballer of the Year: 2016
- All-Star Goalkeeper of the Romanian League: 2021
