= Ekaterina Vetkova =

Russian handball player (born 1986)

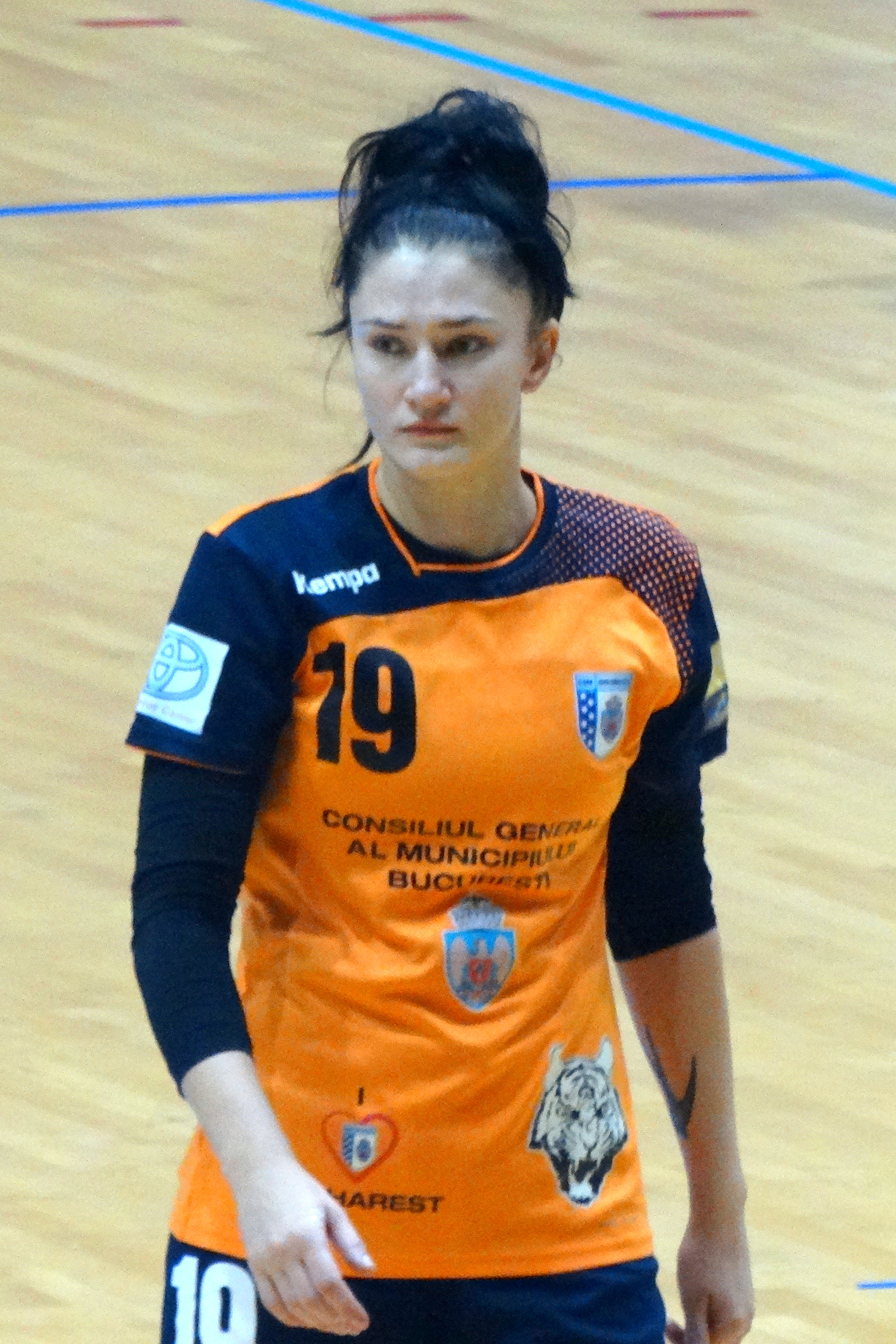
- Vetkova in 2015

Personal information
- Full name: Ekaterina Vladimirovna Vetkova
- Nationality: Russian
- Born: 1 August 1986 (age 40) Syzran, Russian SFSR, Soviet Union
- Height: 1.82 m (6 ft 0 in)

Sport
- Sport: Handball
- Position: Line player
- Current club: Retired

Senior clubs
- Years: Team
- 2000-2007: Lada Togliatti
- 2007-2011: Zvezda Zvenigorod
- 2011-2013: Oltchim Râmnicu Vâlcea
- 2013–2014: Astrakhanochka
- 2014-2016: CSM București
- 2016-2018: Toulon Handball
- 2018-2019: Corona Brașov
- 2019-2020: Dijon Métropole Handball
- 2020-2021: Kastamonu
- 2021-2022: PAOK
- 2022-: Athinaikos
National team
Years	Team	Apps	(Gls)
–	Russia	57	(125)
Medal record
World Championship
Gold medal – first place	2009 China	Team
European Championship
Bronze medal – third place	2008 Macedonia	Team
- Updated on 23 June 2023

Ekaterina Vladimirovna Vetkova (Russian: Екатерина Владимировна Веткова; born 1 August 1986) is a Russian female handballer who plays as a pivot. She is a world champion from the 2009 World Championship.

== Career ==
From 2004 to 2007 she played for Lada Togliatti. Here she won the 2005 and 2006 Russian championship and the 2007 Russian cup.

She then joined Zvezda Zvenigorod, where she won the 2008 EHF Champions League.

In 2011 she joined Romanian Oltchim Râmnicu Vâlcea. Here she won the 2012 and 2013 Romanian championships. In December 2012 she returned to Russia and joined HC Astrakhanochka on loan.

In 2014 she once again moved to Romania and joined CSM București. Here she won the 2015 and 2016 Romanian championship and the 2016 Romanian cup, as well as the 2015-16 Champions League.

Afterwards she joined French team Toulon Handball. Two years later she joined Romanian Corona Brașov. In 2019 she returned to France and joined Dijon Métropole Handball.

In 2020 she moved to Turkey and joined Kastamonu. here she won the 2021 Turkish championship.

Her last club was PAOK in Greece. She left club in January 2022.

== International achievements ==
- EHF Champions League:
  - Winner: 2008, 2016
- EHF Champions Trophy:
  - Winner: 2008
- World Championship:
  - Gold Medallist: 2009
- European Championship:
  - Bronze Medalist: 2009
