= Polyvalent Hall (Bucharest) =

Sports arena in Bucharest, Romania

- Interactive map of Polyvalent Hall
- Location: Bucharest, Romania
- Coordinates: 44°24′19″N 26°06′36″E
- Owner: Municipality of Bucharest
- Capacity: 5,300 seats

Construction
- Opened: 10 August 1974
- Renovated: 2008, 2011

Tenants
- CSM București (LNHF) (2007–present); CSM București (LNHM) (2007–present)

Website
- salapolivalenta.ro

Exterior of arena during 2014 handball tournament

Polyvalent Hall of Bucharest (Romanian: Sala Polivalentă din București) is a multi-purpose indoor arena at the Tineretului Park in Bucharest, Romania. It is home to the CSM București of the National Handball League (LNHF). With a seating capacity of 5,300, the Sala Polivalentă also regularly hosts concerts, conventions and shows.

== Concerts ==
- Anastacia
- Armin van Buuren
- Deep Purple
- Gorillaz
- Iron Maiden (The X Factour, October 17, 1995)
- James Blunt
- Jean-Michel Jarre
- Juanes
- Paul van Dyk
- RBD
- Scorpions
- Sepultura
- Simple Minds
- Steve Vai
- Tiësto
- Yes
- ZZ Top

== Other events ==
- Junior Eurovision Song Contest 2006
- Dota 2
  - The Bucharest Major (US$1,000,000 prize) – September 9–11, 2018
- DreamHack
  - 2013 DreamHack Bucharest – September 14–15, 2013
  - 2014 DreamHack Masters Bucharest – April 26–27, 2014
  - 2015 DreamHack Bucharest – April 24–26, 2015
  - 2016 DreamHack Bucharest – September 16–18, 2016
- Exhibition basketball
  - Harlem Globetrotters – 2007, 2008, 2010, 2017 and 2019
- Boxing
  - 2014 Women's European Amateur Boxing Championships – May 31–June 7, 2014
- Exhibition figure skating
  - Kings On Ice featuring Edvin Marton, Evgeni Plushenko and Surya Bonaly– 2008
- Handball
  - 2000 European Women's Championship Final – December 17, 2000
  - 2005–06 EHF Challenge Cup Final – 2006
  - Olympic Qualifying Tournament 2 – 2008
  - 2009–10 EHF Women's Champions League Final – May 15, 2010
  - 2009–10 EHF Cup Winners' Cup Semifinal – 2010
  - 2011 World Championship – European Qualifying Play-off – June 13, 2010
  - 2012–13 EHF Champions League Semifinal – April 6, 2013
  - Bucharest Trophy – 2014 and 2015
  - Carpathian Trophy – 2018
- Judo
  - 2004 European Judo Championships – May 14–16, 2004
  - 2018 Club World Championship - Champions League – December 7, 2018
- Kickboxing
  - K-1 Fighting Network Romania 2007 – May 4, 2007
  - WAKO European Championships 2012 – November 27–December 1, 2012
  - SUPERKOMBAT World Grand Prix 2012 Final – December 22, 2012
- Professional boxing
  - WBA Lightweight Championship (Leonard Dorin Doroftei vs. Raul Horacio Balbi) – April 19, 2008
  - WBC Light heavyweight Championship (Adrian Diaconu vs. Chris Henry) – May 31, 2002
- Professional wrestling
  - AWR European Invasion Tour featuring Rob Van Dam, X-Pac, Raven, René Duprée and Scotty 2 Hotty – 2009
  - WWE WrestleMania Revenge Tour featuring John Cena, Randy Orton, Sheamus, Daniel Bryan, CM Punk, The Miz, John Morrison, Dolph Ziggler, William Regal, Primo, Santino Marella, Vladimir Kozlov, Sin Cara, The Usos, Mark Henry, Ted DiBiase Jr., Eve Torres, Maryse, Natalya and Alicia Fox – 2011
- Sambo
  - 2018 World Sambo Championships – November 9–12, 2018
- Tennis
  - 2004 Davis Cup World Group – February 6–8, 2004
- Tennis
  - 2017 Fed Cup World Group II – February 11–12, 2017
- Weightlifting
  - 2009 European Weightlifting Championships – April 3–12, 2009
- Wrestling
  - 2019 European Wrestling Championships – April 8–14, 2019
- Volleyball
  - 2017–18 CEV Women's Champions League Final 4 – May 5–6, 2018

== See also ==
- List of indoor arenas in Romania
- List of indoor arenas by capacity
