= 2014 Bucharest Trophy =

European women's handball tournament

- 2014 Bucharest Trophy official logo Bucharest loves Handball

Tournament details
- Dates: 21–24 August
- Teams: 6 (from 1 confederation)

Final positions
- Champions: (Romania) CSM Bucharest (1st title)
- Runner-up: (Montenegro) ŽRK Budućnost
- Third place: (Russia) HC Astrakhanochka

Awards
- Best player: (Brazil) Mayssa Pessoa

The 2014 Bucharest Trophy was the first edition of the Bucharest Trophy held in Bucharest, Romania from 21 to 24 August as a pre-season international women's team handball tournament for clubs. The most recent finalists of the EHF Champions League edition (ŽRK Budućnost) appeared in the tournament, along with the hosts (CSM Bucharest) and others. The most recent winners of the EHF Cup Winners' Cup edition (Viborg HK) have been also invited but withdrew before making a debut due to season's fixtures.

The whole tournament was aired on Sport.ro the channel and Dolce Sport 2.

CSM Bucharest won the title by defeating Budućnost Podgorica in the final.

== Participants ==
- (Romania) CSM Bucharest (hosts)
- (Montenegro) ŽRK Budućnost
- (Russia) Rostov-Don
- (Russia) HC Astrakhanochka
- (Germany) SG BBM Bietigheim
- (Turkey) Muratpaşa Bld. SK

== Results ==
=== Group stage ===
==== Group A ====
Team	Pld	W	D	L	GF	GA	GD	Pts
(Montenegro) ŽRK Budućnost	2	2	0	0	58	47	+11	4
(Russia) Rostov-Don	2	1	0	1	54	53	+1	2
(Germany) SG BBM Bietigheim	2	0	0	2	44	56	−12	0

21 August 2014; 15:30	ŽRK Budućnost (Montenegro)	30–26	(Russia) Rostov-Don	Polyvalent Hall, Bucharest; Attendance: 1,000; Referees: Pârvu, Stamatoiu (ROU)
21 August 2014; 15:30	Bulatović 7	(16–14)	Ilina, Bobrovnikova 6	Polyvalent Hall, Bucharest; Attendance: 1,000; Referees: Pârvu, Stamatoiu (ROU)
21 August 2014; 15:30		Report		Polyvalent Hall, Bucharest; Attendance: 1,000; Referees: Pârvu, Stamatoiu (ROU)

22 August 2014; 15:30	Rostov-Don (Russia)	28–23	(Germany) SG BBM Bietigheim	Polyvalent Hall, Bucharest; Referees: Harabagiu, Stănescu (ROU)
22 August 2014; 15:30	Managarova, Borshchenko 5	(15–10)	Ilyés 10	Polyvalent Hall, Bucharest; Referees: Harabagiu, Stănescu (ROU)
22 August 2014; 15:30		Report		Polyvalent Hall, Bucharest; Referees: Harabagiu, Stănescu (ROU)

23 August 2014; 15:30	ŽRK Budućnost (Montenegro)	28–21	(Germany) SG BBM Bietigheim	Polyvalent Hall, Bucharest
23 August 2014; 15:30	Petrovic 9	(18–9)	Malestein 9	Polyvalent Hall, Bucharest
23 August 2014; 15:30		Report		Polyvalent Hall, Bucharest

==== Group B ====
Team	Pld	W	D	L	GF	GA	GD	Pts
(Romania) CSM Bucharest	2	2	0	0	58	33	+25	4
(Russia) HC Astrakhanochka	2	1	0	1	50	45	+5	2
(Turkey) Muratpaşa Bld. SK	2	0	0	2	34	64	−30	0

21 August 2014; 18:00	CSM Bucharest (Romania)	33–14	(Turkey) Muratpaşa Bld. SK	Polyvalent Hall, Bucharest; Attendance: 1,000; Referees: Florescu, Stoia (ROU)
21 August 2014; 18:00	Rodrigues, Glibko 5	(18–7)	Laiuk 8	Polyvalent Hall, Bucharest; Attendance: 1,000; Referees: Florescu, Stoia (ROU)
21 August 2014; 18:00		Report		Polyvalent Hall, Bucharest; Attendance: 1,000; Referees: Florescu, Stoia (ROU)

22 August 2014; 18:00	HC Astrakhanochka (Russia)	31–20	(Turkey) Muratpaşa Bld. SK	Polyvalent Hall, Bucharest; Referees: Doană, Gociu (ROU)
22 August 2014; 18:00	Kuznetcova 12	(15–12)	Pavić 6	Polyvalent Hall, Bucharest; Referees: Doană, Gociu (ROU)
22 August 2014; 18:00		Report		Polyvalent Hall, Bucharest; Referees: Doană, Gociu (ROU)

23 August 2014; 18:00	CSM Bucharest (Romania)	25–19	HC Astrakhanochka (Russia)	Polyvalent Hall, Bucharest; Attendance: 1,500
23 August 2014; 18:00	Rodrigues 6	(10–9)	Yezhykava 6	Polyvalent Hall, Bucharest; Attendance: 1,500
23 August 2014; 18:00		Report		Polyvalent Hall, Bucharest; Attendance: 1,500

=== Knockout stages ===
==== 5th place game ====
24 August 2014; 13:00	(Germany) SG BBM Bietigheim	30–29	(Turkey) Muratpaşa Bld. SK	Polyvalent Hall, Bucharest
24 August 2014; 13:00	Ilyés 11	(16–14)	Laiuk 10	Polyvalent Hall, Bucharest
24 August 2014; 13:00		Report		Polyvalent Hall, Bucharest

==== 3rd place game ====
24 August 2014
15:30
(Russia) HC Astrakhanochka
32–31 (ET)
(Russia) Rostov-Don
Polyvalent Hall, Bucharest
Referees: Harabagiu, Stănescu (ROU)
Rachiteleva 9
(10–13)
Ilina 6

Report

FT: 27–27 ET: 32–31

==== Final ====
24 August 2014; 18:00	(Romania) CSM Bucharest	24–20	(Montenegro) ŽRK Budućnost	Polyvalent Hall, Bucharest; Attendance: 2,800; Referees: Florescu, Stoia (ROU)
24 August 2014; 18:00	Rodrigues 9	(12–12)	Cvijić 7	Polyvalent Hall, Bucharest; Attendance: 2,800; Referees: Florescu, Stoia (ROU)
24 August 2014; 18:00		Report		Polyvalent Hall, Bucharest; Attendance: 2,800; Referees: Florescu, Stoia (ROU)

== Awards ==
=== Team of the Tournament ===
- Goalkeeper: Mayssa Pessoa (BRA)
- Left wing: Polina Kuznetcova (RUS)
- Left back: Cristina Neagu (ROU)
- Playmaker: Ana Paula Rodrigues (BRA)
- Pivot: Dragana Cvijić (SRB)
- Right back: Katarina Bulatović (MNE)
- Right wing: Radmila Petrovic (MNE)

=== Special awards ===
- Top Scorer: Annamária Ilyés (HUN)
- Most Valuable Player: Mayssa Pessoa (BRA)
