= Jakob Vestergaard =

Danish handball coach (born 1975)

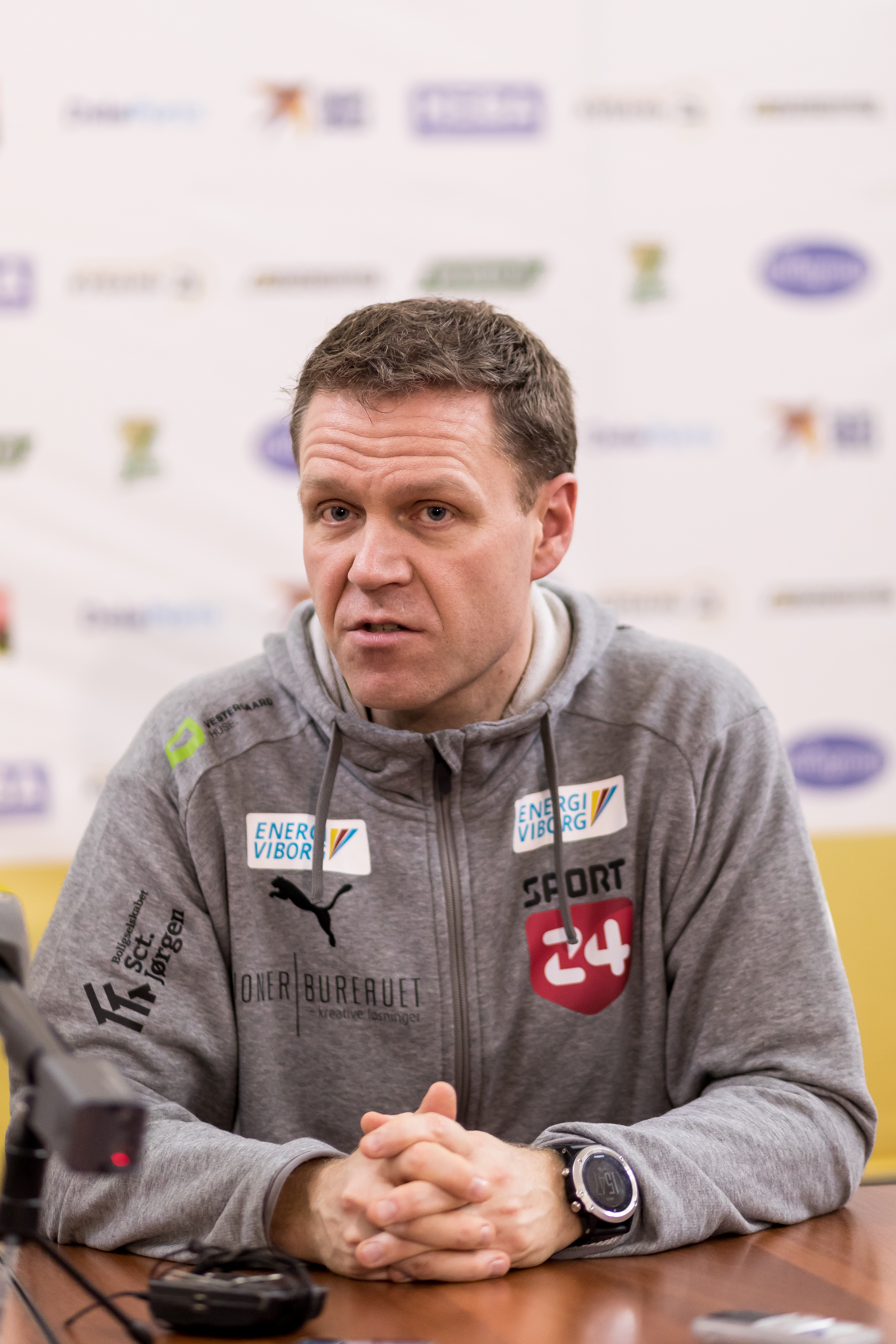

Personal information
- Full name: Jakob Vestergaard
- Nationality: Danish
- Born: 3 January 1975 (age 51)

Sport
- Sport: Handball

Teams managed
- Years: Team
- 2007–2008: Australia Women
- 2008–2011: Viborg HK
- 2011: Aalborg Håndbold
- 2012–2013: CS Oltchim Râmnicu Vâlcea
- 2014–2015: CSM Bucharest (technical director)
- 2015–2016: Germany Women
- 2016: CSM Bucharest
- 2018: Randers HH
- 2018–2023: Viborg HK
- 2023–2025: SG BBM Bietigheim
- 2025–: Odense Håndbold

Jakob Vestergaard (born 3 January 1975) is a Danish handball coach who is the manager of the HB Ludwigsburg.

== Coaching career ==
Vestergaard was in charge by Romanian top division side CS Oltchim Râmnicu Vâlcea for the 2012–2013 season. He later coached the Germany Women's national team from 2015 to 2016.

== International honours ==
- Champions League:
  - Winner: 2009, 2010
