= Ana Paula Rodrigues =

Brazilian gymnast (born 1988)

Personal information
- Born: 20 January 1988 (age 38) Curitiba, Brazil

Sport
- Sport: Gymnastics

Ana Paula Rodrigues (born 20 January 1988) is a Brazilian gymnast. She competed at the 2004 Summer Olympics.
