= Bucharest Trophy =

- Current season, competition or edition: 2015 Bucharest Trophy
- Sport: Handball
- Founded: 2014
- No. of teams: 6
- Most recent champion(s): (Romania) CSM Bucharest

The Bucharest Trophy (Romanian: Trofeul București) is a pre-season international women's team handball tournament for clubs, held each year in Bucharest, Romania. The competition is hosted by Liga Naţională club CSM Bucharest at the Sala Polivalentă and governed by the rules and regulations of the IHF. It is currently contested by six teams. The event, inaugurated in 2014, is considered the most prestigious annual friendly tournament that takes place in Romania.

== Tournaments ==
| Edition | Year | Winner | Runner-up | Third | Fourth | Fifth | Sixth |
|---|---|---|---|---|---|---|---|
| 1 | 2014 | (Romania) Bucharest | (Montenegro) Podgorica | (Russia) Astrakhan | (Russia) Rostov-Don | (Germany) Bietigheim | (Turkey) Antalya |
| 2 | 2015 | (Romania) Bucharest | (Montenegro) Podgorica | (North Macedonia) Vardar | (Russia) Rostov-Don | (Romania) Baia Mare | (Romania) Brașov |

== See also ==
- Baia Mare Champions Trophy
