= Montenegro at the 2012 Summer Olympics =

- IOC code: MNE
- NOC: Montenegrin Olympic Committee
- Website: www.cok.me(in Montenegrin)

in London
- Competitors: 34 in 7 sports
- Flag bearers: Srđan Mrvaljević (opening); Bojana Popović (closing)
- Medals Ranked 69th: Gold 0 Silver 1 Bronze 0 Total 1

Summer Olympics appearances (overview)
- 2008; 2012; 2016; 2020; 2024

Other related appearances
- Yugoslavia (1920–1992W); Independent Olympic Participants (1992S); Serbia and Montenegro (1996–2006)

Montenegro competed at the 2012 Summer Olympics in London, from 27 July to 12 August 2012. This was the nation's second appearance at the Summer Olympics.

Montenegrin Olympic Committee sent a total of 34 athletes to the Games, 18 men and 16 women, to compete in 7 sports. Most of them participated in team-based sports, particularly in men's water polo, and women's handball. Pistol shooter Nikola Šaranović, who competed in his second Olympics for the independent nation, was the oldest member of the team, at age 41. Meanwhile, judoka Srđan Mrvaljević, who was elected as the "best athlete of the year" in 2011 by the Montenegrin Olympic Committee, became the nation's flag bearer at the opening ceremony.

Montenegro left London with its first ever Olympic medal as an independent nation, taking silver by the women's handball team.

== Medalists ==
Medal	Name	Sport	Event	Date
Silver	Montenegro women's national handball team: Marina Vukčević; Radmila Miljanić; Jovanka Radičević; Ana Đokić; Marija Jovanović; Ana Radović; Anđela Bulatović; Sonja Barjaktarović; Maja Savić; Bojana Popović; Suzana Lazović; Katarina Bulatović; Majda Mehmedović; Milena Knežević	Handball	Women's tournament	11 August

== Athletics ==
Montenegro qualified one athlete in the men's discus throw, and the other in women's marathon after having achieved the "B" standard.

Key

- Note–Ranks given for track events are within the athlete's heat only
- Q = Qualified for the next round
- q = Qualified for the next round as a fastest loser or, in field events, by position without achieving the qualifying target
- NR = National record
- N/A = Round not applicable for the event
- Bye = Athlete not required to compete in round

Men

Athlete	Event	Qualification		Final	
Athlete	Event	Distance	Position	Distance	Position
Danijel Furtula	Discus throw	57.48	38	Did not advance	

Women

Athlete	Event	Final	
Athlete	Event	Result	Rank
Slađana Perunović	Marathon	2:39:07 NR	77

== Boxing ==
Montenegro qualified one boxer in the men's light heavyweight division by invitation.

Men

Athlete	Event	Round of 32	Round of 16	Quarterfinals	Semifinals	Final	
Athlete	Event	Opposition Result	Opposition Result	Opposition Result	Opposition Result	Opposition Result	Rank
Boško Drašković	Light heavyweight	Bravo (NCA); L 11–16	Did not advance				

== Handball ==
Montenegro qualified a team in the women's tournament.

=== Women's tournament ===
The following is the Montenegro roster in the women's handball tournament of the 2012 Summer Olympics.

Head coaches: Dragan Adžić

No.	Pos.	Name	Date of birth (age)	Height	App.	Goals	Club
1	GK	Marina Vukčević	24 August 1993 (aged 18)	1.75 m			(Montenegro) ŽRK Budućnost
2	RW	Radmila Miljanić	19 April 1988 (aged 24)	1.57 m			(Montenegro) ŽRK Budućnost
4	RW	Jovanka Radičević	23 October 1986 (aged 25)	1.70 m			(Hungary) Győri Audi
5	P	Ana Đokić	9 February 1979 (aged 33)	1.65 m			(Montenegro) ŽRK Budućnost
8	LB	Marija Jovanović	26 December 1985 (aged 26)	1.82 m			(Romania) Oltchim Vâlcea
9	CB	Ana Radović	21 August 1986 (aged 25)	1.75 m			(Montenegro) ŽRK Budućnost
10	CB	Anđela Bulatović	15 January 1987 (aged 25)	1.75 m			(Montenegro) ŽRK Budućnost
12	GK	Sonja Barjaktarović	11 September 1986 (aged 25)	1.80 m			(Montenegro) ŽRK Budućnost
14	LW	Maja Savić	29 April 1976 (aged 36)	1.76 m			(Montenegro) ŽRK Budućnost
17	LB	Bojana Popović	20 November 1979 (aged 32)	1.85 m			(Montenegro) ŽRK Budućnost
26	P	Suzana Lazović	28 January 1992 (aged 20)	1.76 m			(Montenegro) ŽRK Budućnost
32	RB	Katarina Bulatović	15 November 1984 (aged 27)	1.86 m			(Romania) Oltchim Vâlcea
77	LW	Majda Mehmedović	25 May 1990 (aged 22)	1.71 m			(Montenegro) ŽRK Budućnost
90	CB	Milena Knežević	12 March 1990 (aged 22)	1.77 m			(Montenegro) ŽRK Budućnost

Group play

Team	Pld	W	D	L	GF	GA	GD	Pts	Qualification
Brazil	5	4	0	1	137	122	+15	8	Quarter-finals
Croatia	5	4	0	1	145	115	+30	8	Quarter-finals
Russia	5	3	1	1	151	125	+26	7	Quarter-finals
Montenegro	5	2	1	2	137	123	+14	5	Quarter-finals
Angola	5	1	0	4	132	142	−10	2	
Great Britain	5	0	0	5	91	166	−75	0	

28 July 2012; 19:30	Montenegro	31 – 19	Great Britain	Copper Box, London; Attendance: 3,941; Referees: Duţă, Florescu (ROU)
28 July 2012; 19:30	A. Bulatović 5	(18–12)	Gerbron 6	Copper Box, London; Attendance: 3,941; Referees: Duţă, Florescu (ROU)
28 July 2012; 19:30	3× (yellow card) 4× (suspension)	Report	3× (yellow card) 5× (suspension)	Copper Box, London; Attendance: 3,941; Referees: Duţă, Florescu (ROU)

30 July 2012; 19:30	Brazil	27 – 25	Montenegro	Copper Box, London; Attendance: 3,974; Referees: Olesen, Pedersen (DEN)
30 July 2012; 19:30	do Nascimento 8	(15–16)	K. Bulatović 5	Copper Box, London; Attendance: 3,974; Referees: Olesen, Pedersen (DEN)
30 July 2012; 19:30	3× (yellow card) 4× (suspension) 1× (red card)	Report	3× (yellow card) 7× (suspension) 1× (red card)	Copper Box, London; Attendance: 3,974; Referees: Olesen, Pedersen (DEN)

1 August 2012; 11:15	Montenegro	30 – 25	Angola	Copper Box, London; Attendance: 4,354; Referees: Abdulla, Bamutref (QAT)
1 August 2012; 11:15	Popović, K. Bulatović 6	(13–14)	Carlos 7	Copper Box, London; Attendance: 4,354; Referees: Abdulla, Bamutref (QAT)
1 August 2012; 11:15	3× (yellow card) 3× (suspension)	Report	3× (yellow card) 3× (suspension)	Copper Box, London; Attendance: 4,354; Referees: Abdulla, Bamutref (QAT)

3 August 2012; 14:30	Croatia	27 – 26	Montenegro	Copper Box, London; Attendance: 4,541; Referees: Lopez, Sabroso (ESP)
3 August 2012; 14:30	Penezić 10	(12–12)	Popović 10	Copper Box, London; Attendance: 4,541; Referees: Lopez, Sabroso (ESP)
3 August 2012; 14:30	3× (yellow card) 5× (suspension)	Report	2× (yellow card) 4× (suspension)	Copper Box, London; Attendance: 4,541; Referees: Lopez, Sabroso (ESP)

5 August 2012; 14:30	Montenegro	25 – 25	Russia	Copper Box, London; Attendance: 4,444; Referees: Abrahamsen, Kristiansen (NOR)
5 August 2012; 14:30	Bulatović 7	(15–16)	three players 4	Copper Box, London; Attendance: 4,444; Referees: Abrahamsen, Kristiansen (NOR)
5 August 2012; 14:30	2× (yellow card) 6× (suspension)	Report	2× (yellow card) 8× (suspension) 1× (red card)	Copper Box, London; Attendance: 4,444; Referees: Abrahamsen, Kristiansen (NOR)

Quarter-final

7 August 2012; 20:30	France	22 – 23	Montenegro	Copper Box, London; Attendance: 4,559; Referees: Olesen, Pedersen (DEN)
7 August 2012; 20:30	Signaté 5	(13–13)	Popović, Bulatović 6	Copper Box, London; Attendance: 4,559; Referees: Olesen, Pedersen (DEN)
7 August 2012; 20:30	3× (yellow card) 2× (suspension)	Report	4× (yellow card) 3× (suspension)	Copper Box, London; Attendance: 4,559; Referees: Olesen, Pedersen (DEN)

Semi-final

9 August 2012; 20:30	Spain	26 – 27	Montenegro	Basketball Arena, London; Attendance: 9,087; Referees: Krstić, Ljubić (SLO)
9 August 2012; 20:30	Alberto 6	(13–13)	Bulatović 9	Basketball Arena, London; Attendance: 9,087; Referees: Krstić, Ljubić (SLO)
9 August 2012; 20:30	2× (yellow card) 1× (suspension)	Report	3× (yellow card) 4× (suspension)	Basketball Arena, London; Attendance: 9,087; Referees: Krstić, Ljubić (SLO)

Final

11 August 2012; 20:30	Norway	26 – 23	Montenegro	Basketball Arena, London; Attendance: 9,739; Referees: Bonaventura, Bonaventura (FRA)
11 August 2012; 20:30	Sulland 10	(13–10)	Bulatović 10	Basketball Arena, London; Attendance: 9,739; Referees: Bonaventura, Bonaventura (FRA)
11 August 2012; 20:30	3× (yellow card) 3× (suspension)	Report	3× (yellow card) 7× (suspension) 1× (red card)	Basketball Arena, London; Attendance: 9,739; Referees: Bonaventura, Bonaventura (FRA)

Final rank
Silver

== Judo ==
Montenegro qualified 1 judoka by world ranking in the men's half-heavyweight division.

Athlete	Event	Round of 64	Round of 32	Round of 16	Quarterfinals	Semifinals	Repechage	Final / BM	
Athlete	Event	Opposition Result	Opposition Result	Opposition Result	Opposition Result	Opposition Result	Opposition Result	Opposition Result	Rank
Srđan Mrvaljević	Men's −81 kg	Bye	Naulu (FIJ); W 0111–0003	Valois-Fortier (CAN); L 0011–0112	Did not advance				

== Sailing ==
Montenegro qualified 1 boat in the men's Laser class through a tripartite invitation.

Men

Athlete	Event	Race											Net points	Final rank
Athlete	Event	1	2	3	4	5	6	7	8	9	10	M*	Net points	Final rank
Milivoj Dukić	Laser	26	33	35	32	22	30	24	~~38~~	23	24	EL	249	30

M = Medal race; EL = Eliminated – did not advance into the medal race;

== Shooting ==
Montenegro qualified one shooter for the following events.

Men

Athlete	Event	Qualification		Final	
Athlete	Event	Points	Rank	Points	Rank
Nikola Šaranović	50 m pistol	524	38	Did not advance	
Nikola Šaranović	10 m air pistol	565	41	Did not advance	

== Water polo ==
Montenegro qualified a team in the men's competition through the Men's water polo qualification tournament.

- Men's event – 1 team of 13 players

=== Men's tournament ===
Team roster

The following is the Montenegrin roster in the men's water polo tournament of the 2012 Summer Olympics.

№	Name	Pos.	Height	Weight	Date of birth	2012 club
1	Denis Sefik	D	1.98 m (6 ft 6 in)	115 kg (254 lb)	20 September 1976	(Italy) ASD Civitavecchia
2	Draško Brguljan	D	1.94 m (6 ft 4 in)	88 kg (194 lb)	27 December 1984	(Hungary) TEVA-Vasas-UNIQA
3	Vjekoslav Pasković	D	1.81 m (5 ft 11 in)	85 kg (187 lb)	23 March 1985	(Italy) Posillipo
4	Antonio Petrović	CB	1.93 m (6 ft 4 in)	95 kg (209 lb)	24 September 1982	(Italy) RN Savona
5	Dragan Drasković	D	1.92 m (6 ft 4 in)	94 kg (207 lb)	1 September 1988	(Italy) RN Bogliasco
6	Aleksandar Radović	D	1.91 m (6 ft 3 in)	95 kg (209 lb)	24 February 1987	(Serbia) VK Partizan
7	Mlađan Janović	D	1.91 m (6 ft 3 in)	94 kg (207 lb)	11 June 1984	(Italy) RN Savona
8	Nikola Janović	D	1.91 m (6 ft 3 in)	100 kg (220 lb)	22 March 1980	(Croatia) VK Jug Dubrovnik
9	Aleksandar Ivović	CB	1.97 m (6 ft 6 in)	105 kg (231 lb)	24 February 1986	(Montenegro) PVK Jadran
10	Boris Zloković	CF	1.97 m (6 ft 6 in)	100 kg (220 lb)	16 March 1983	(Italy) Pro Recco
11	Vladimir Gojković	D	1.88 m (6 ft 2 in)	92 kg (203 lb)	29 January 1981	(Montenegro) PVK Jadran
12	Predrag Jokić	CF	1.88 m (6 ft 2 in)	96 kg (212 lb)	3 February 1983	(Montenegro) VK Budva
13	Miloš Šćepanović	GK	1.85 m (6 ft 1 in)	89 kg (196 lb)	9 October 1982	(Montenegro) PVK Jadran

Head coach: Ranko Perović

Group play

Team	Pld	W	D	L	GF	GA	GD	Pts	Qualification
Serbia	5	4	1	0	69	38	+31	9	Quarterfinals
Montenegro	5	3	1	1	54	41	+13	7	Quarterfinals
Hungary	5	3	0	2	65	52	+13	6	Quarterfinals
United States	5	3	0	2	43	44	−1	6	Quarterfinals
Romania	5	1	0	4	48	55	−7	2	
Great Britain	5	0	0	5	28	77	−49	0	

29 July 2012; 19:40	Report	Montenegro	7–8	United States	Water Polo Arena, London; Referees: Georgios Stavridis (GRE), Daniel Flahive (AUS)
29 July 2012; 19:40	Report	Score by quarters: 1–1, 1–3, 2–2, 3–2			Water Polo Arena, London; Referees: Georgios Stavridis (GRE), Daniel Flahive (AUS)
29 July 2012; 19:40	Report	Ivović 3	Goals	Varellas 3	Water Polo Arena, London; Referees: Georgios Stavridis (GRE), Daniel Flahive (AUS)

31 July 2012; 10:00	Report	Hungary	10–11	Montenegro	Water Polo Arena, London; Referees: Sergi Sanchez (ESP), Daniel Flahive (AUS)
31 July 2012; 10:00	Report	Score by quarters: 2–2, 3–4, 3–3, 2–2			Water Polo Arena, London; Referees: Sergi Sanchez (ESP), Daniel Flahive (AUS)
31 July 2012; 10:00	Report	Biros 3	Goals	Brguljan 3	Water Polo Arena, London; Referees: Sergi Sanchez (ESP), Daniel Flahive (AUS)

2 August 2012; 14:10	Report	Montenegro	11–11	Serbia	Water Polo Arena, London; Referees: Georgios Stavridis (GRE), Massimiliano Caputi (ITA)
2 August 2012; 14:10	Report	Score by quarters: 1–3, 2–1, 5–4, 3–3			Water Polo Arena, London; Referees: Georgios Stavridis (GRE), Massimiliano Caputi (ITA)
2 August 2012; 14:10	Report	Ivović 3	Goals	Prlainović 5	Water Polo Arena, London; Referees: Georgios Stavridis (GRE), Massimiliano Caputi (ITA)

4 August 2012; 10:00	Report	Montenegro	12–8	Romania	Water Polo Arena, London; Referees: Daniel Flahive (AUS), Alan Balfanbayev (KAZ)
4 August 2012; 10:00	Report	Score by quarters: 3–1, 2–1, 3–2, 4–4			Water Polo Arena, London; Referees: Daniel Flahive (AUS), Alan Balfanbayev (KAZ)
4 August 2012; 10:00	Report	Ivović 3	Goals	Diaconu 3	Water Polo Arena, London; Referees: Daniel Flahive (AUS), Alan Balfanbayev (KAZ)

6 August 2012; 18:20	Report	Great Britain	4–13	Montenegro	Water Polo Arena, London; Referees: Ni Shiwei (CHN), Kazuhiko Makita (JPN)
6 August 2012; 18:20	Report	Score by quarters: 1–4, 2–4, 1–2, 0–3			Water Polo Arena, London; Referees: Ni Shiwei (CHN), Kazuhiko Makita (JPN)
6 August 2012; 18:20	Report	four players 1	Goals	Zloković 3	Water Polo Arena, London; Referees: Ni Shiwei (CHN), Kazuhiko Makita (JPN)

Quarterfinal

8 August 2012; 14:30	Report	Spain	9–11	Montenegro	Water Polo Arena, London; Referees: Adrian Alexandrescu (ROU), Ulrich Spiegel (GER)
8 August 2012; 14:30	Report	Score by quarters: 4–4, 1–3, 1–3, 3–1			Water Polo Arena, London; Referees: Adrian Alexandrescu (ROU), Ulrich Spiegel (GER)
8 August 2012; 14:30	Report	Vallès, Minguell 2	Goals	Zloković 4	Water Polo Arena, London; Referees: Adrian Alexandrescu (ROU), Ulrich Spiegel (GER)

Semifinal

10 August 2012; 15:40	Report	Croatia	7–5	Montenegro	Water Polo Arena, London; Referees: Daniel Flahive (AUS), Georgios Stavridis (GRE)
10 August 2012; 15:40	Report	Score by quarters: 3–1, 2–0, 2–2, 0–2			Water Polo Arena, London; Referees: Daniel Flahive (AUS), Georgios Stavridis (GRE)
10 August 2012; 15:40	Report	Sukno 2	Goals	Ivović, Gojković 2	Water Polo Arena, London; Referees: Daniel Flahive (AUS), Georgios Stavridis (GRE)

Bronze medal match

12 August 2012; 14:30	Report	Montenegro	11–12	Serbia (bronze)	Water Polo Arena, London; Referees: Massimiliano Caputi (ITA), Georgios Stavridis (GRE)
12 August 2012; 14:30	Report	Score by quarters: 2–3, 3–1, 5–4, 1–4			Water Polo Arena, London; Referees: Massimiliano Caputi (ITA), Georgios Stavridis (GRE)
12 August 2012; 14:30	Report	Ivović 3	Goals	Filipović 3	Water Polo Arena, London; Referees: Massimiliano Caputi (ITA), Georgios Stavridis (GRE)

== See also ==
- Montenegro at the 2012 Winter Youth Olympics
