= Handball at the 2012 Summer Olympics =

Coordinates: 51.5486°N 0.0139°W

Handball at the Games of the XXX Olympiad

Tournament details
- Host country: United Kingdom
- Venue(s): Basketball Arena; Copper Box Arena
- Dates: 28 July – 9 August 2012
- Teams: 24 (from 9 confederations)

Final positions
- Champions: France (men); Norway (women)
- Runners-up: Sweden (men); Montenegro (women)
- Third place: Croatia (men); Spain (women)
- Fourth place: Hungary (men); South Korea (women)

The handball tournaments at the 2012 Olympic Games in London was held from 28 July to 12 August in the Olympic Park.

Preliminary rounds and the quarter-finals were held in the Copper Box while the semi-finals and final took place in the larger Basketball Arena.

Medals were awarded in a men's tournament and a women's tournament. The gold medals were won by France (men) and Norway (women).

== Events ==
Two sets of medals were awarded in the following events:

- Men's handball (12 teams)
- Women's handball (12 teams)

== Referees ==
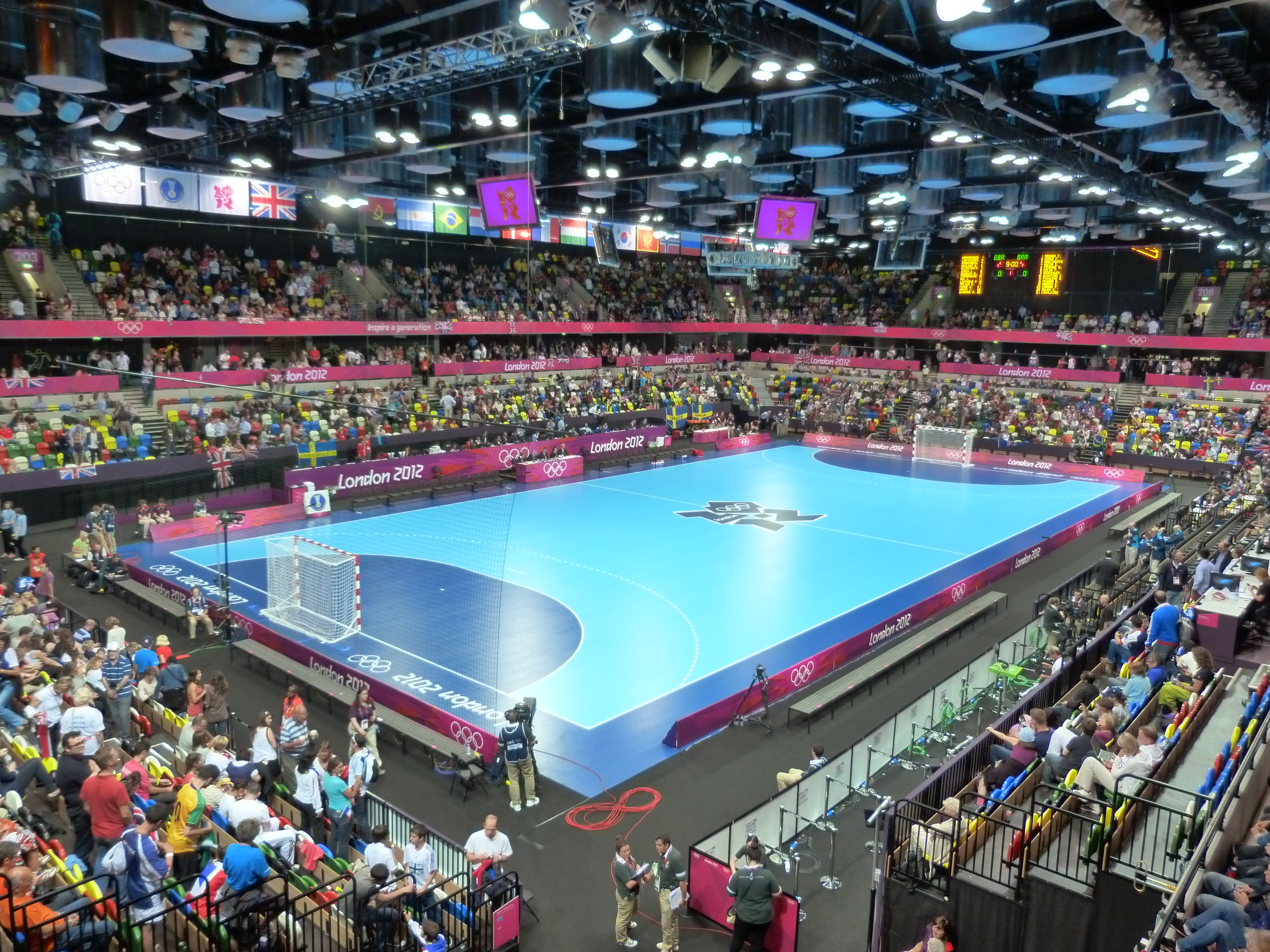
The Copper Box staged the preliminary matches.

The executive committee of the International Handball Federation appointed 17 referee pairs for the 2012 Games:

- (France) Charlotte Bonaventura and Julie Bonaventura
- (Romania) Diana-Carmen Florescu and Anamaria Duță
- (Argentina) Carlos María Mariana and Darío Leonel Minore
- (Ivory Coast) Yalatima Coulibali and Mamoudou Diabaté
- (Croatia) Matija Gubica and Boris Milošević
- (Czech Republic) Václav Horáček and Jiří Novotný
- (Denmark) Per Olesen and Lars Ejby Pedersen
- (Spain) Oscar Raluy and Ángel Sabroso
- (France) Nordine Lazaar and Laurent Reveret
- (United Kingdom) Brian Bartlett and Allan Stokes
- (Germany) Lars Geipel and Marcus Helbig
- (North Macedonia) Gjorgi Nachevski and Slave Nikolov
- (Norway) Kenneth Abrahamsen and Arne M. Kristiansen
- (Qatar) Mansour Abdulla Al-Suwaidi and Saleh Jamaan Bamurtef
- (Slovenia) Nenad Krstič and Peter Ljubič
- (Serbia) Nenad Nikolić and Dušan Stojković
- (United Arab Emirates) Omar Mohammed Zubaeer Al-Marzouqi and Mohammed Rashid Mohamed Al-Nuaimi

== Qualifying criteria ==
Each National Olympic Committee may enter up to one men's and one women's team in the handball tournaments.

=== Men ===
| | Date | Venue | Vacancies | Qualified |
|---|---|---|---|---|
| Host nation | 6 July 2005 | Singapore | 1 | Great Britain |
| 2011 World Championship | 13–30 January 2011 | Sweden | 1 | France |
| 2011 Pan American Games | 16–24 October 2011 | Mexico | 1 | Argentina |
| 2011 Asian Olympic Qualification Tournament | 23 October – 2 November 2011 | South Korea | 1 | South Korea |
| 2012 African Championship | 11–20 January 2012 | Morocco | 1 | Tunisia |
| 2012 European Championship | 15–29 January 2012 | Serbia | 1 | Denmark |
| 2012 IHF Qualification Tournament #1 | 6–8 April 2012 | Spain | 2 | Spain; Serbia |
| 2012 IHF Qualification Tournament #2 | 6–8 April 2012 | Sweden | 2 | Sweden; Hungary |
| 2012 IHF Qualification Tournament #3 | 6–8 April 2012 | Croatia | 2 | Croatia; Iceland |
| Total | | | 12 | |

=== Women ===
| | Date | Venue | Vacancies | Qualified |
|---|---|---|---|---|
| Host Nation | 6 July 2005 | Singapore | 1 | Great Britain |
| 2010 European Championship | 7–19 December 2010 | Denmark; Norway | 1 | Sweden^{†} |
| 2011 Asian Olympic Qualification Tournament | 12–21 October 2011 | China | 1 | South Korea |
| 2011 Pan American Games | 15–23 October 2011 | Mexico | 1 | Brazil |
| 2011 World Championship | 2–18 December 2011 | Brazil | 1 | Norway |
| 2012 African Championship | 11–20 January 2012 | Morocco | 1 | Angola |
| 2012 IHF Qualification Tournament #1 | 25–27 May 2012 | France | 2 | Montenegro; France |
| 2012 IHF Qualification Tournament #2 | 25–27 May 2012 | Spain | 2 | Spain; Croatia |
| 2012 IHF Qualification Tournament #3 | 25–27 May 2012 | Denmark | 2 | Russia; Denmark |
| Total | | | 12 | |

^{†} Sweden qualified as 2010 European Championship runner up because Norway qualified as the 2011 World Champion.

== Medal summary ==
=== Medal table ===
| Rank | Nation | Gold | Silver | Bronze | Total |
|---|---|---|---|---|---|
| 1 | France | 1 | 0 | 0 | 1 |
| 1 | Norway | 1 | 0 | 0 | 1 |
| 3 | Montenegro | 0 | 1 | 0 | 1 |
| 3 | Sweden | 0 | 1 | 0 | 1 |
| 5 | Croatia | 0 | 0 | 1 | 1 |
| 5 | Spain | 0 | 0 | 1 | 1 |
| Totals (6 entries) | | 2 | 2 | 2 | 6 |

=== Medalists ===
| Event | Gold | Silver | Bronze |
|---|---|---|---|
| Men's handball | France; Jérôme Fernandez; Didier Dinart; Xavier Barachet; Guillaume Gille; Bertrand Gille; Daniel Narcisse; Guillaume Joli; Samuel Honrubia; Daouda Karaboué; Nikola Karabatić; Thierry Omeyer; William Accambray; Luc Abalo; Cédric Sorhaindo; Michaël Guigou | Sweden; Mattias Andersson; Mattias Gustafsson; Kim Andersson; Jonas Källman; Magnus Jernemyr; Niclas Ekberg; Dalibor Doder; Jonas Larholm; Tobias Karlsson; Johan Jakobsson; Johan Sjöstrand; Fredrik Petersen; Kim Ekdahl du Rietz; Mattias Zachrisson; Andreas Nilsson | Croatia; Venio Losert; Ivano Balić; Domagoj Duvnjak; Blaženko Lacković; Marko Kopljar; Igor Vori; Jakov Gojun; Zlatko Horvat; Drago Vuković; Damir Bičanić; Denis Buntić; Mirko Alilović; Manuel Štrlek; Ivan Čupić; Ivan Ninčević |
| Women's handball | Norway; Kari Aalvik Grimsbø; Ida Alstad; Heidi Løke; Tonje Nøstvold; Karoline Dyhre Breivang; Kristine Lunde-Borgersen; Kari Mette Johansen; Marit Malm Frafjord; Linn Jørum Sulland; Katrine Lunde Haraldsen; Linn-Kristin Riegelhuth Koren; Gøril Snorroeggen; Amanda Kurtović; Camilla Herrem | Montenegro; Marina Vukčević; Radmila Miljanić; Jovanka Radičević; Ana Đokić; Marija Jovanović; Ana Radović; Anđela Bulatović; Sonja Barjaktarović; Maja Savić; Bojana Popović; Suzana Lazović; Katarina Bulatović; Majda Mehmedović; Milena Knežević | Spain; Andrea Barnó; Carmen Martín*; Nely Carla Alberto; Beatriz Fernández; Verónica Cuadrado; Marta Mangué; Macarena Aguilar; Silvia Navarro; Jessica Alonso; Elisabeth Pinedo; Begoña Fernández; Vanessa Amorós; Patricia Elorza; Mihaela Ciobanu; Marta López* |
