= Per Johansson (handballer) =

Swedish handball coach (born 1970)

Personal information
- Full name: Per Anders Johansson
- Nationality: Swedish
- Born: 10 November 1970 (age 55) Uddevalla, Sweden

Sport
- Sport: Handball
- Current club: Győri ETO KC (head coach)

Teams managed
- Years: Team
- 1993–1997: GF Kroppskultur
- 1999–2002: Alingsås HK
- 2002–2003: Sweden U21
- 2005–2008: Sweden (assistant)
- 2008–2012: Sweden
- 2014–2017: Kungälvs HK
- 04-06/2017: CSM București
- 2017–2018: Boden Handboll IF
- 2017–2020: Montenegro
- 03-06/2018: CSM București
- 2020–2022: Rostov-Don
- 2022–2024: Netherlands
- 2024–: Győri ETO KC

Per Johansson (born 10 November 1970) is a Swedish handball coach for Hungarian club Győri ETO KC.

== Career ==
During his playing days he played for Uddevalla HK in his hometown.

Johansson was head coach for the Sweden women's national team between 2009 and 2012. At the 2010 European Women's Handball Championship he led the Swedish team to the final match against Norway.

In March 2017 he became coach of CSM București until the end of the season.

At the end of November 2017 it was announced that Johansson will lead Montenegro in the 2017 IHF World Championship as coach of the women's National Team, replacing Dragan Adžić.

In 2020 he became coach of Rostov-Don, a contract which he ended in March 2022 because of the Russian invasion of Ukraine. Since 2022 he's the coach of Netherlands women's national team.

On 18 March 2024 it was announced that he would be the head coach of Győri ETO KC until the end of the season. His first match was on 24 March with Győr against Váci NKSE. The match was won by ETO but the Swedish trainer wasn't satisfied at all. After the bumpy season, Győri ETO KC won the Women's EHF Champions League in 2024 with his leading.

On 2 September 2024 he decided to end his contract with the Netherlands women's national handball team so he can only focus on his club Győri ETO KC.

== Achievements ==
European Championships

- 2010 – 2nd

EHF Champions League

- 2024 – Winner
- 2025 – Winner
- 2017 – 3rd
- 2018 – 3rd
