= Babović =

Babović is a South-Slavic surname. Notable people with the surname include:

- Anastasija Babović (born 2000), Montenegrin handball player
- Milka Babović (born 1928), Croatian athlete and journalist
- Nenad Babović (born 1976), Serbian rower
- Stefan Babović (born 1987), Serbian soccer player
