= Dragan Adžić =

Montenegrin handball coach (born 1969)

Personal information
- Nationality: Montenegrin
- Born: 13 December 1969 (age 56) Ivangrad, SR Montenegro, SFR Yugoslavia
- Height: 184 cm (72 in)

Sport
- Sport: Handball
- Current club: Slovenia (women); Mosonmagyaróvári KC SE

Senior clubs
- Years: Team
- –: RK Budućnost Podgorica
- –: Rudar
- –: Epoksid
- –: RK Buje 53
- –: Borec
- –: Mladost
- –: Rimako

Teams managed
- 2010–2020: Budućnost
- 2010–2017: Montenegro (women)
- 2021–: Slovenia (women)
- 2022–2024: RK Krim
- 2025-2026: Mosonmagyaróvári KC SE
Medal record
Representing Montenegro
Olympic Games
Silver medal – second place	2012 London	Coach
European Championship
Gold medal – first place	2012 Serbia	Coach

Dragan Adžić (born 13 December 1969) is a Montenegrin handball coach who is currently coaching the Slovenia women's national team.

== Career ==
As a player he played for RK Budućnost Podgorica, Rudar, Epoksid, RK Buje 53, Borec, Mladost and Rimako.

His coaching career started as the youth team of ŽRK Budućnost Podgorica. From 2001 to 2009 he was the assistant coach of the team, and in January 2010 he took over as the head coach. He led the team to the EHF Cup Winners' Cup title in 2010, the EHF Champions League in 2012 and 2015 every single national title from 2009 to 2019. In November 2020 he announced his intention to leave the team.

In 2010 he took over as the head coach of the Montenegro women's team. He led Montenegro at the 2011 World Women's Handball Championship in Brazil. With the team, he won silver medal at the 2012 Summer Olympics. Later the same year he guided the team to their first ever international title 2012 European Women's Handball Championship. In August 2016 he left the team after a disappointing result at the 2016 Olympics, but he came back just a month later. In the mean time he was replaced by Bojana Popovic who had been his assistant coach up until that point.

In April 2021 he took over the Slovenian women's team. From the 2022-23 season he became the head coach of Slovenian top team RK Krim alongside his national team position. He led the team to the 2023 and 2024 Slovenian Championship and cup. He stopped in this position in November 2024.

For the 2025-26 season he became the head coach of Hungarian team Mosonmagyaróvári KC SE. He left the team in March 2026.

== Honours ==
Montenegro

- 2012 Olympic Games London – 2nd place
- European Championship 2012 – 1st place

ŽRK Budućnost Podgorica

- EHF Champions League: 2012, 2015
- EHF Cup Winners' Cup: 2010
- Montenegrin League: 2010, 2011, 2012, 2013, 2014, 2015, 2016, 2017, 2018, 2019
- Montenegrin Cup: 2010, 2011, 2012, 2013, 2014, 2015, 2016, 2017, 2018, 2019
- Women's Regional Handball League: 2010, 2011, 2012, 2013, 2014, 2015, 2016, 2019

RK Krim

- Slovenian Championship: 2023, 2024
- Slovenian Cup: 2023, 2024
