= Marina Rajčić =

Montenegrin handball player (born 1993)

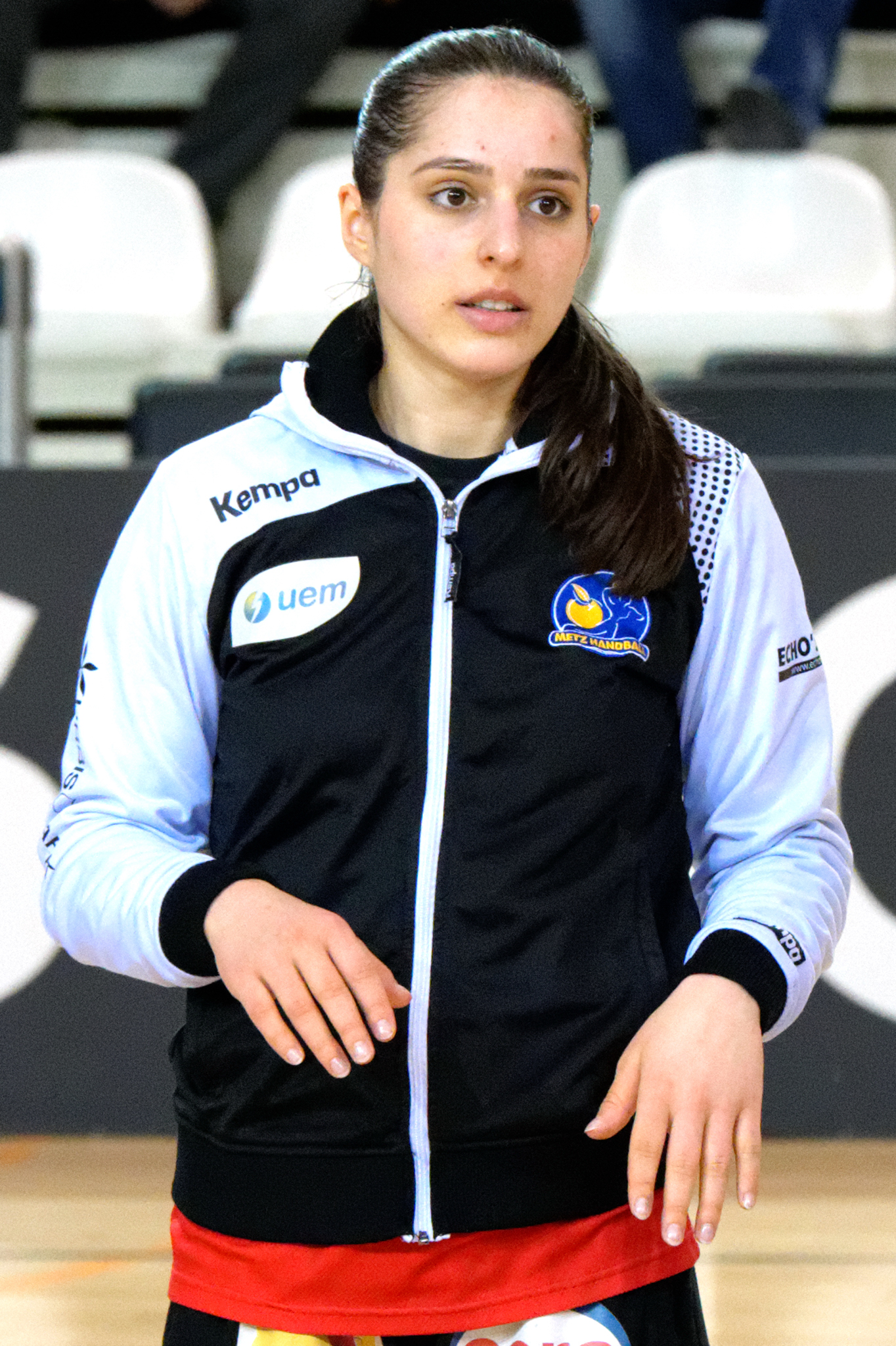
- Rajčić in 2016

Personal information
- Nationality: Montenegrin
- Born: 24 August 1993 (age 33) Podgorica, Montenegro, FR Yugoslavia
- Height: 1.78 m (5 ft 10 in)

Sport
- Sport: Handball
- Position: Goalkeeper
- Current club: SCM Craiova
- Number: 1

Senior clubs
- Years: Team
- 2009–2015: ŽRK Budućnost Podgorica
- 2015–2018: Metz Handball
- 2018–2021: ŽRK Budućnost Podgorica
- 2021–2022: Kastamonu
- 2022–2023: Siófok KC
- 2023–2025: CS Măgura Cisnădie
- 2025–: SCM Craiova
National team
Years	Team	Apps	(Gls)
2010–2024	Montenegro	170	(4)
Medal record
Olympic Games
Silver medal – second place	2012 London	Team
European Championship
Gold medal – first place	2012 Serbia
Bronze medal – third place	2022 Slovenia/North Macedonia/Montenegro
Junior World Championship
Bronze medal – third place	2010 South Korea

Marina Rajčić née Vukčević, (born 24 August 1993) is a Montenegrin handball goalkeeper for SCM Craiova and formerly the Montenegrin national team.

She was part of the Montenegrin team that won their first ever international title at the 2012 European Women's Handball Championship.

She is married to Vladimir Rajčić.

== Achievements ==
- Montenegrin Championship:
  - Winner: 2010, 2011, 2012, 2013, 2014, 2015, 2019, 2021
- Montenegrin Cup:
  - Winner: 2010, 2011, 2012, 2013, 2014, 2015, 2019, 2021
- Women's Regional Handball League:
  - Winner: 2010, 2011, 2012, 2013, 2014, 2015, 2019
- Junior World Championship:
  - Bronze Medalist: 2010
- France Championship:
  - Winner: 2016, 2017, 2018
- French Cup:
  - Winner: 2017
- EHF Champions League
  - Winner: 2012, 2015
- Women's EHF Cup Winners' Cup:
  - Winner: 2010

== Individual awards ==
- All-Star Goalkeeper of the Junior World Championship: 2010
- Montenegrin Olympic Committee young sportswomen of the year: 2012
