= Majda Mehmedović =

Montenegrin handball player (born 1990)

Personal information
- Nationality: Montenegrin
- Born: 25 May 1990 (age 36) Bar, SR Montenegro, SFR Yugoslavia
- Height: 1.69 m (5 ft 7 in)

Sport
- Sport: Handball
- Position: Left wing
- Current club: Kastamonu
- Number: 77

Senior clubs
- Years: Team
- 2007–2016: ŽRK Budućnost Podgorica
- 2016–2019: CSM București
- 2019–2021: ŽRK Budućnost Podgorica
- 2021–2023: Kastamonu
National team
Years	Team	Apps	(Gls)
2008–2021	Montenegro	135	(368)
Medal record
Olympic Games
Silver medal – second place	2012 London	Team
European Championship
Gold medal – first place	2012 Serbia
Mediterranean Games
Bronze medal – third place	2009 Pescara	Team
Junior World Championship
Bronze medal – third place	2010 South Korea

Majda Kirmizi née Mehmedović, (born 25 May 1990) is a retired Montenegrin handball player and a former player of the Montenegrin national team.

She was part of the Montenegrin team that won their first ever international title at the 2012 European Women's Handball Championship. She also won a silver medal at the 2012 Summer Olympics.

== International honours ==
=== Club ===
- Montenegrin Championship:
  - Winner: 2010, 2011, 2012, 2013, 2014, 2015, 2021
- Montenegrin Cup:
  - Winner: 2010, 2011, 2012, 2013, 2014, 2015, 2021
- EHF Champions League:
  - Winner: 2012, 2015
  - Bronze Medalist: 2017, 2018
- EHF Cup Winners' Cup:
  - Winner: 2010

=== National team ===
- European Championship:
  - Winner: 2012
- Summer Olympics:
  - Silver Medalist: 2012

== Individual awards ==
- ProSport All-Star Left Wing of the Romanian Liga Națională: 2017
- Handball-Planet.com All-Star Left Wing: 2018
- All-Star Left Wing of the European Championship: 2018
- All-Star Left Wing of the EHF Champions League: 2014, 2021
