= Jo Hyo-bi =

South Korean handball player (born 1991)

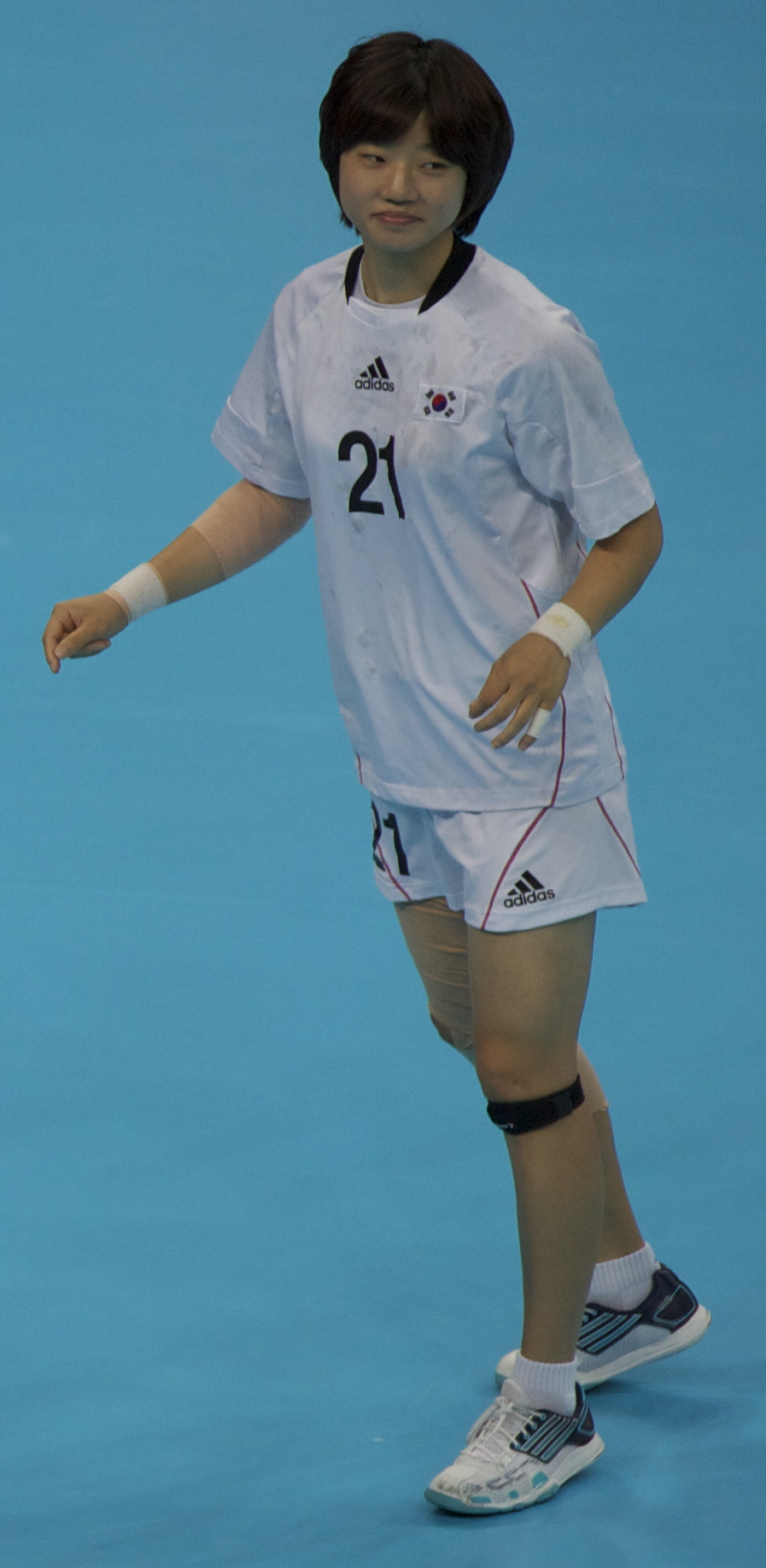

Korean name
- Hangul: 조효비
- Hanja: 趙效妃
- RR: Jo Hyobi
- MR: Cho Hyobi

Jo Hyo-Bi (born 1991) is a South Korean handball player. She plays for the club Incheon, and on the South Korean national team. She competed for the Korean team at the 2012 Summer Olympics in London.
