= Ana Đokić =

Montenegrin handball player (born 1979)

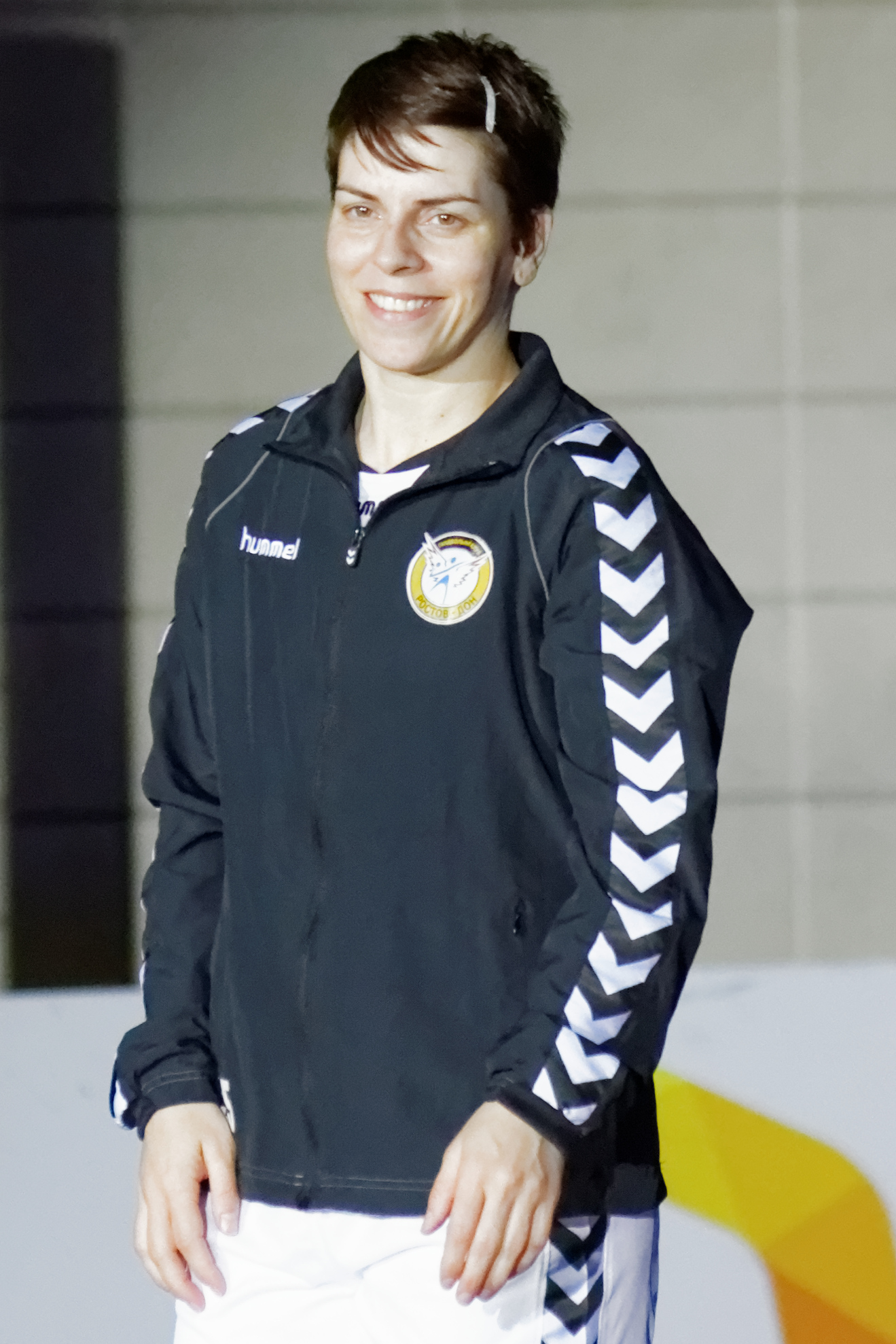

Personal information
- Nationality: Montenegrin
- Born: 9 February 1979 (age 47) Aranđelovac, SR Serbia, SFR Yugoslavia
- Height: 1.67 m (5 ft 6 in)

Sport
- Sport: Handball
- Position: Pivot
- Current club: Retired
- Number: 5
National team
| Years | Team | | |
| –2006 | Serbia and Montenegro | | |
| 2006–2008 | Serbia | | |
| 2011– | Montenegro | 43 | (82) |
Medal record
Representing Montenegro
Olympic Games
| Silver medal – second place | 2012 London | Team |
European Championship
| Gold medal – first place | 2012 Serbia | Team |
Representing Serbia and Montenegro
Mediterranean Games
| Silver medal – second place | 2005 Almería | Team |

Ana Đokić (Serbian Cyrillic: Ана Ђокић; born 9 February 1979) is a former Serbian and Montenegrin handball player. She was part of the Montenegrin team that won their first ever international title at the 2012 European Women's Handball Championship. She also participated at the 2011 World Women's Handball Championship in Brazil. and at the 2012 Summer Olympics, where the Montenegrin team won the silver medal.

She currently plays for ŽRK Vardar, in the Macedonian League and the EHF Cup.
