= Jessica Alonso Bernardo =

Spanish handball player (born 1983)

Jessica Alonso
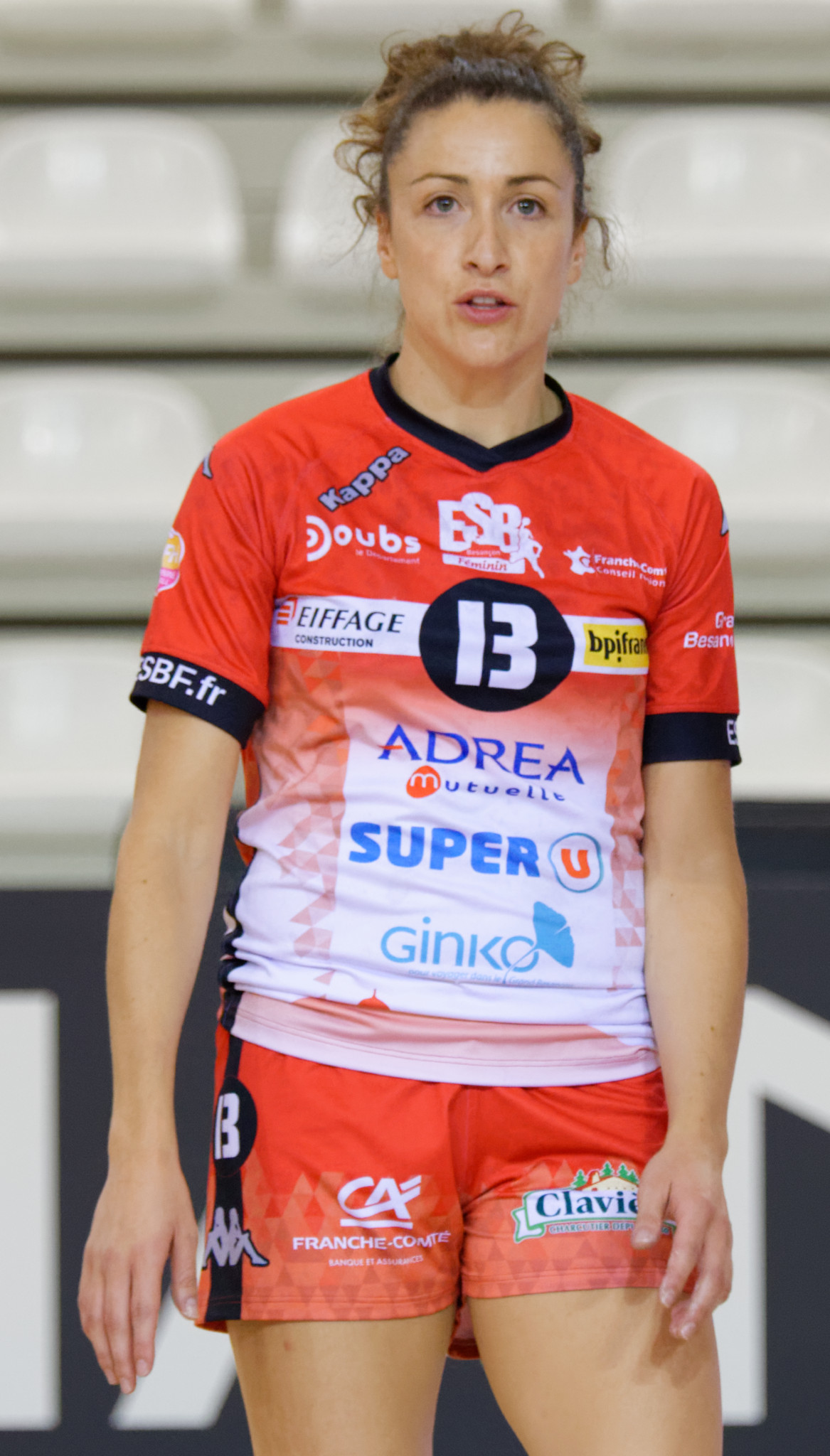

Personal information
- Full name: Jessica Alonso Bernardo
- Nationality: Spanish
- Born: 20 September 1983 (age 43) Gijón, Spain
- Height: 1.75 m (5 ft 9 in)

Sport
- Sport: Handball
- Position: Right wing

Senior clubs
- Years: Team
- 2003–2006: Feve Gijón
- 2006–2012: SD Itxako
- 2012–2013: ŽRK Zaječar
- 2013–2015: Le Havre AC
- 2015–2016: ESBF Besançon
National team
Years	Team	Apps	(Gls)
2005-2015	Spain	97	(202)
Medal record
Olympic Games
Bronze medal – third place	2012 London	Team
World Championship
Bronze medal – third place	2011 Brazil	Team
European Championship
Silver medal – second place	2008 Macedonia	Team

Jessica Alonso Bernardo (born 20 September 1983) is a former Spanish handball player, who was of the Spanish women's national team.

She was part of the Spanish team at the 2008 European Women's Handball Championship, where the Spanish team reached the final, after defeating Germany in the semifinal. She was also part of the bronze medal-winning Spanish teams at the 2011 World Championships (the first world championship medal for the Spanish women's team) and the 2012 Olympics.
