= Marija Jovanović (Montenegrin handballer) =

Montenegrin handball player (born 1985)

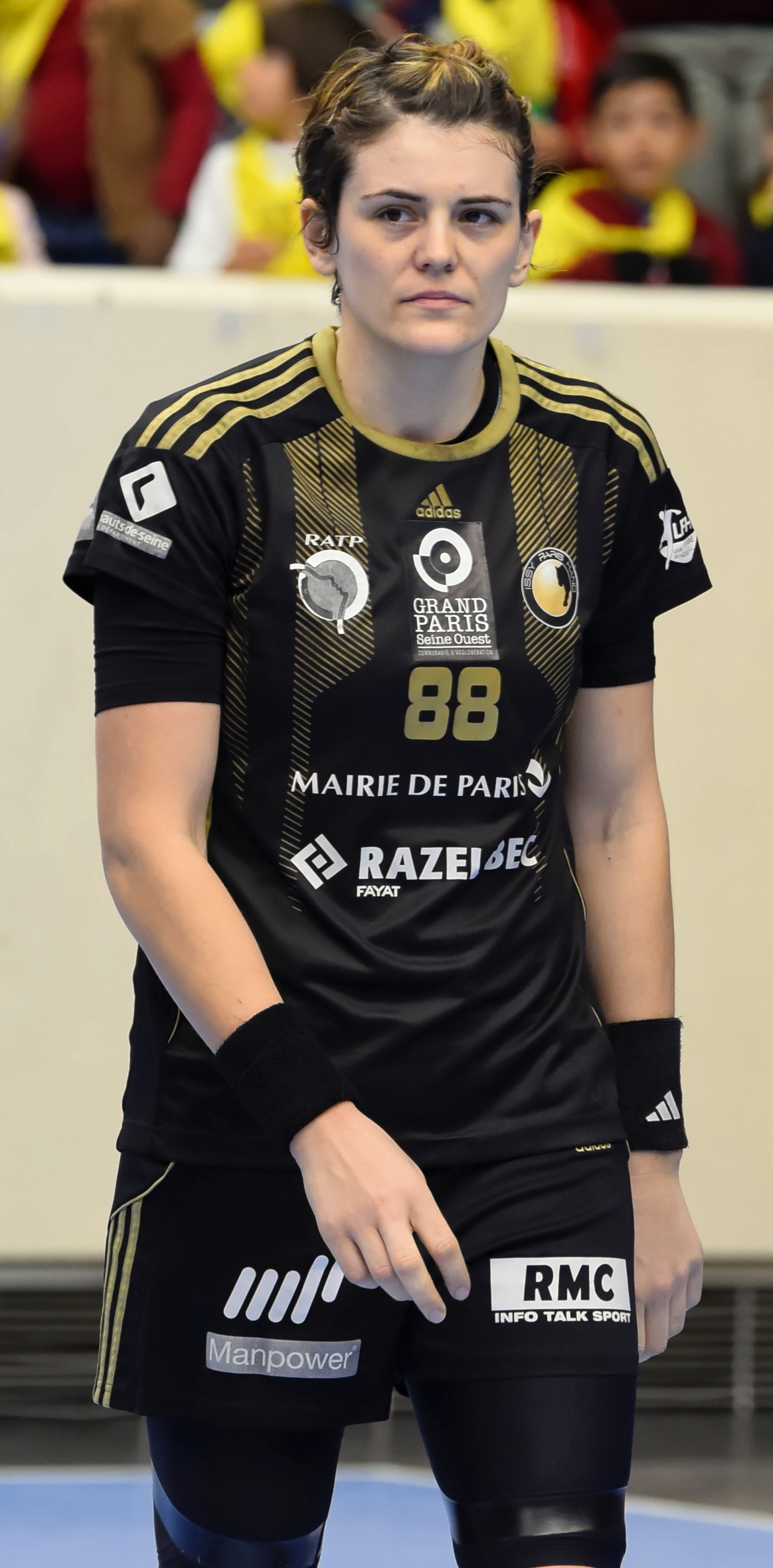
- Marija Jovanović in 2015

Personal information
- Born: 26 December 1985 (age 40) Titograd, SR Montenegro, SFR Yugoslavia
- Height: 1.82 m (6 ft 0 in)

Sport
- Sport: Handball
- Position: Left back
- Current club: Retired

Senior clubs
- Years: Team
- 2000-2004: ŽRK Danilovgrad
- 2004–2005: ŽRK Medicinar Šabac
- 2005–2011: ŽRK Budućnost Podgorica
- 2011–2013: Oltchim Vâlcea
- 2013–2014: HC Astrakhanochka
- 2014–2016: Issy-Paris Hand
- 2016–2018: Ferencváros
National team
Years	Team	Apps	(Gls)
2006-2016	Montenegro	132	(507)
Medal record
Olympic Games
Silver medal – second place	2012 London	Team
European Championship
Gold medal – first place	2012 Serbia	Team
Mediterranean Games
Bronze medal – third place	2009 Pescara	Team

Marija Jovanović (born 26 December 1985) is a retired Montenegrin handball player. She played for the Montenegrin national team.

She competed at the 2010 European Women's Handball Championship, where the Montenegrin team placed sixth, and Jovanović was listed among the top ten goalscorers of the tournament (scoring 31 goals). As captain, she led the Montenegrin national team when they won a gold medal at the European Championship in Serbia. After two years spent at the Ferencvárosi, she decided to end her career and graduated in Business Economics in 2018. She has been in private business ever since.

== Honours ==
Club

- EHF Champions League:
  - Semifinalist: 2011, 2012, 2013
- EHF Cup Winners' Cup:
  - Winner: 2006 and 2010
- Women's Regional Handball League:
  - Winner: 2010 and 2011
  - Silver Medallist: 2009
- Montenegrin Championship:
  - Winner: 2006, 2007, 2008, 2009, 2010 and 2011
- Montenegrin Cup:
  - Winner: 2006, 2007, 2008, 2009, 2010 and 2011
- Romanian Championship:
  - Winner: 2012, 2013
- Romanian Supercup:
  - Winner: 2011

National team

- European Handball Championship:
  - Gold Medallist: 2012
- Olympics:
  - Silver Medallist: 2012
