= Anastasija Babović =

Montenegrin handball player (born 2000)

Personal information
- Nationality: Montenegrin
- Born: 13 December 2000 (age 25) Podgorica, Montenegro, FR Yugoslavia
- Height: 1.82 m (6 ft 0 in)

Sport
- Sport: Handball
- Position: Goalkeeper
- Current club: CSM Iași 2020
- Number: 33

Senior clubs
- Years: Team
- 2016–2022: ŽRK Budućnost Podgorica
- 2020–2021: → Dunaújvárosi Kohász KA
- 2022–2023: SCM Craiova
- 2023: ŽRK Budućnost Podgorica
- 2024: CS Gloria Bistrița-Năsăud
- 2024–: CSM Iași 2020
National team
Years	Team	Apps	(Gls)
–	Montenegro	25	(1)

Anastasija Babović (born 13 December 2000) is a Montenegrin female handball player for CSM Iași 2020, and the Montenegrin national team.

She represented Montenegro at the 2020 European Women's Handball Championship.
