= Maja Savić =

Montenegrin handball player (born 1976)

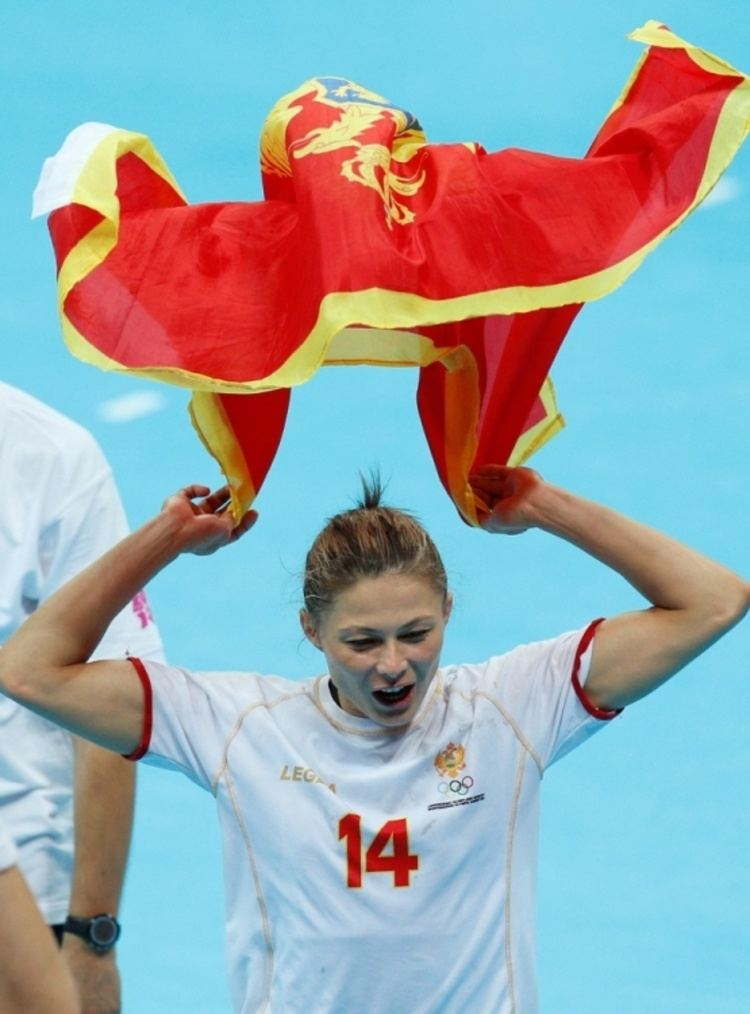

Personal information
- Full name: Maja Savić
- Nationality: Montenegrin
- Born: 29 April 1976 (age 50) Ivangrad, SR Montenegro, SFR Yugoslavia
- Height: 1.76 m (5 ft 9 in)

Sport
- Sport: Handball
- Position: left wing
- Number: 14

Senior clubs
- Years: Team
- 1990–2004: ŽRK Budućnost
- 2004–2008: Slagelse Dream Team
- 2008–2010: F.C. Copenhagen
- 2010–2011: Viborg HK
- 2011–2012: ŽRK Budućnost
National team
- Years: Team
- 2001–?: Serbia and Montenegro
- 2006–2012: Montenegro

Teams managed
- 2021–2024: Montenegro (assistant coach)
Medal record
Women's handball
Representing FR Yugoslavia
World Championship
Bronze medal – third place	2001 Italy
European Beach Championship
Bronze medal – third place	2002 Spain
Representing Montenegro
Olympic Games
Silver medal – second place	2012 Great Britain/London

Maja Savić (born April 29, 1976) is a former Montenegrin handball player, playing for ŽRK Budućnost, where she came to from Viborg HK. She plays on the left wing position, and was member of ŽRK Budućnost and Slagelse Dream Team (2004–2008).

Maja Savić played for the national teams of FR Yugoslavia and Serbia and Montenegro. In the 2001 World Women's Handball Championship, where Yugoslavia won bronze, Maja Savić was declared the Best Left Wing of the World and member of All Star Team At the 2012 Summer Olympics, she was part of the Montenegrin handball team that won the silver medal.

She was included in the European Handball Federation Hall of Fame in 2023.
