= Ana Radović (handballer) =

Montenegrin handball player (born 1986)

Personal information
- Nationality: Montenigrin
- Born: 21 August 1986 (age 40) Sarajevo, Yugoslavia
- Height: 175 cm (69 in)

Sport
- Sport: Handball
- Position: Centre back

Senior clubs
- Years: Team
- -2005: RK Medicinar Šabac
- 2006–2012: ŽRK Budućnost Podgorica
- 2012-2013: KIF Vejen
- 2013-2018: ŽRK Medicinar Šabac
- 2024-: ŽRK Loznica Grad
National team
Years	Team	Apps	(Gls)
–	Montenegro	62	(163)
Medal record
Olympic Games
Silver medal – second place	2012 London	Team
Mediterranean Games
Bronze medal – third place	2009 Pescara	Team
- Updated on 9 October 2024

Ana Radović (Serbian Cyrillic: Ана Радовић; born 21 August 1986) is a former Montenegrin handballer. She played for the Montenegrin national team, where she won silver medals at the 2012 Olympics. She also participated at the 2011 World Women's Handball Championship in Brazil.

== Club career ==
Starting her career in RK Medicinar Šabac, she later played six full seasons for ŽRK Budućnost Podgorica (2006–2012), also winning the EHF Cup Winners' Cup in 2010 and the Champions League with the Podgorica club in the 2011–12 season.

The following she decided it is time for new challenge, and joined Danish club KIF Vejen for the 2012–13 season. A year later she returned to ŽRK Medicinar Šabac. In October 2016 she broke the record for most goals in a single game in the Serbian league with 21. She retired after the 2017–18 season.

In 2024 she returned to handball and joined ŽRK Loznica Grad.
