= Suzana Lazović =

Montenegrin handball player (born 1992)

Personal information
- Nationality: Montenegrin
- Born: 28 January 1992 (age 34) Titograd, SFR Yugoslavia
- Height: 1.76 m (5 ft 9 in)

Sport
- Sport: Handball
- Position: Pivot
- Current club: Retired
- Number: 92

Senior clubs
- Years: Team
- 2007–2018: ŽRK Budućnost Podgorica
National team
Years	Team	Apps	(Gls)
2008–2016	Montenegro	97	(111)
Medal record
Olympic Games
Silver medal – second place	2012 London	Team
European Championship
Gold medal – first place	2012 Serbia	Team
Junior World Championship
Bronze medal – third place	2010 South Korea	Team
Mediterranean Games
Bronze medal – third place	2009 Pescara	Team

Suzana Lazović (born 28 January 1992) is a retired Montenegrin handballer that played for ŽRK Budućnost Podgorica and the Montenegro women's national handball team. She was also a Serbia and Montenegro national junior judo champion.

== Handball and coaching career ==
Lazović was part of the Montenegrin teams that won silver at the 2012 Summer Olympics, and gold at the 2012 Women's EHF European Championship. She was also on the Budućnost team that won the 2012 EHF Women's Champions League and 2015 EHF Women's Champions League. The team were also runners up in the 2013-2014 season. Lazović won the award for best defender in the 2013 Champions League.

Lazović participated at the 2011 World Women's Handball Championship in Brazil, but Montenegro did not progress from the group stages.

Lazović had to retire at the age of 25 due to injuries, including a severely herniated disc, heart ablation and a neck injury, and moved into handball coaching. She coached the Montenegrin junior team. She then moved to China and coached their youth, junior and senior teams. During her reign, the Chinese junior team reached the last 16 of the IHF Women's Junior World Championship, for the first time in 33 years. She has also coached at club level with the Hungarian team, Alba Fehervar. Lazović was Montenegro's coach at the 2024 European handball championships, taking over from Bojana Popovic. Prior to their April 2025 match against Portugal, Lazović talked about 'rejuvenating the line up' of the team.

== Judo career ==
Despite her success at handball, Lazović's original sport was judo. As a junior, she won the Serbia and Montenegro national championship. She signed her first professional contract at 16, for Budućnost. She played for them for her entire career.
