= Katarina Bulatović =

Montenegrin handball player (born 1984)

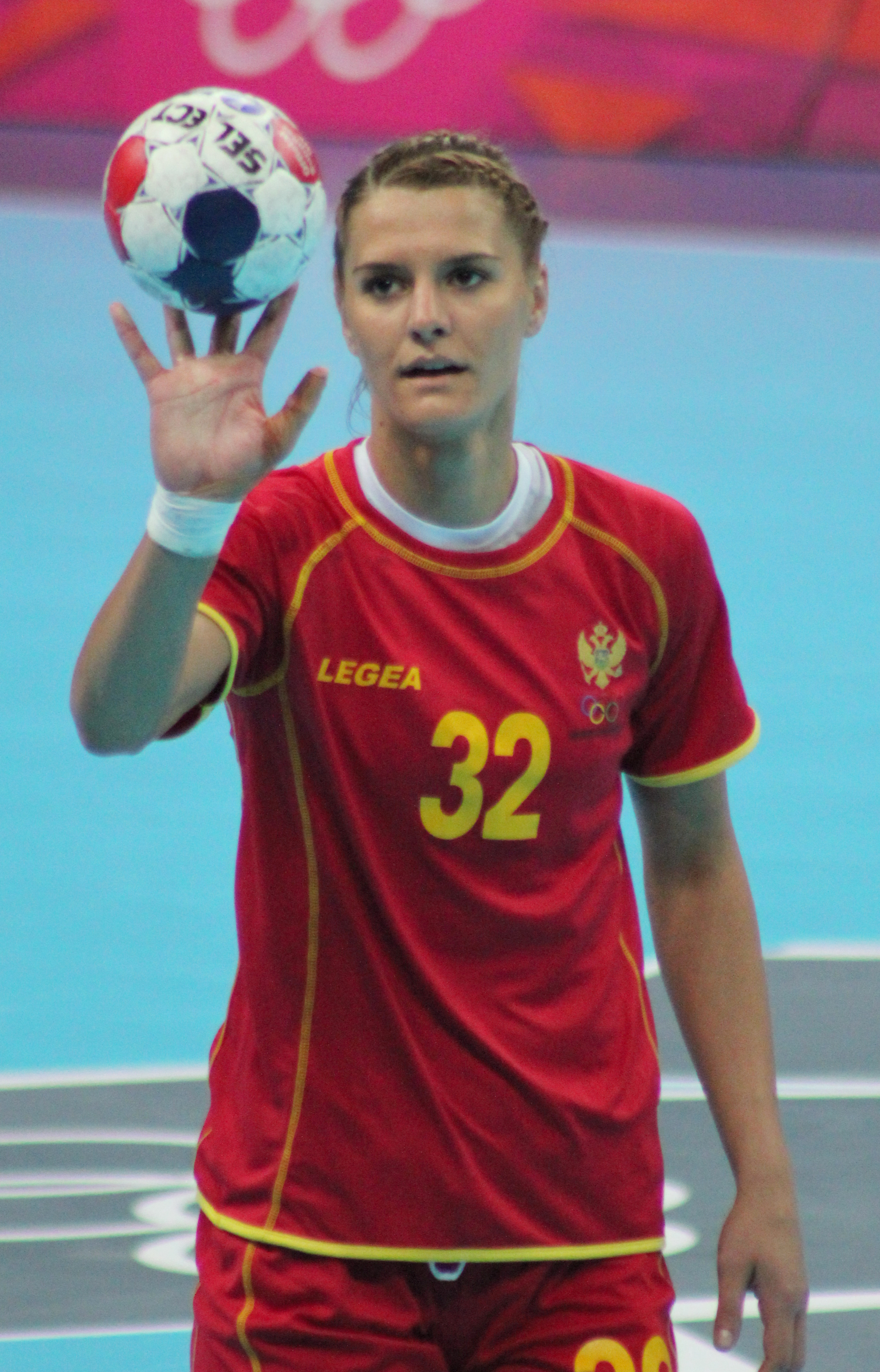
- Bulatović at the 2012 Summer Olympics

Personal information
- Nationality: Montenegrin
- Born: 15 November 1984 (age 41) Kragujevac, SR Serbia, SFR Yugoslavia
- Height: 1.86 m (6 ft 1 in)

Sport
- Sport: Handball
- Position: Right back
- Current club: Retired
- Number: 32

Youth career
- Years: Team
- 1995–2000: ŽRK Kragujevac

Senior clubs
- Years: Team
- 2000–2003: ŽRK Kragujevac
- 2002–2003: → ŽRK Knjaz Miloš (loan)
- 2003–2006: ŽRK Humel Lasta
- 2006–01/2008: Slagelse FH
- 01/2008–2012: ŽRK Budućnost Podgorica
- 2012–2013: CS Oltchim
- 2013–2014: Győri ETO KC
- 2014–2017: ŽRK Budućnost Podgorica
- 2017–2018: Rostov-Don
- 2018–2019: ŽRK Budućnost Podgorica
- 2019–2020: Győri ETO KC
National team
Years	Team		
2003–2006	Serbia and Montenegro		
2006–2008	Serbia		
2011–2020	Montenegro	94	(473)
Medal record
Representing Montenegro
Olympic Games
Silver medal – second place	2012 London	Team
European Championship
Gold medal – first place	2012 Serbia
Representing Serbia and Montenegro
Mediterranean Games
Silver medal – second place	2005 Almería	Team

Katarina Bulatović (born 15 November 1984) is a retired Montenegrin handball player, that played the right back position.

She was included in the European Handball Federation Hall of Fame in 2023.

== Career ==
Internationally she represented Serbia and Montenegro and Serbia, before opting to play for Montenegro in 2011.

She was third best goalscorer of the EHF Women's Champions League in the three editions, 2010–11, 2011–12, 2013–14.

She competed at the 2012 Summer Olympics, where the Montenegrin team won the silver medal, and Bulatović was top scorer with 53 goals and also voted into the All-star team.

She has also competed at the 2012 European Women's Handball Championship, where the Montenegrin team won the gold medal, and Bulatović was top scorer with 56 goals and also voted into the All-star team.

Bulatović was selected for the shortlist of the 2012 IHF World Player of the Year award, and eventually came fourth by collecting 12 percent of the total votes.

After two years abroad, Bulatović is set to move back to Montenegro in summer 2014.

== Achievements ==
- Damehåndboldligaen:
  - Winner: 2007
- Montenegrin Championship:
  - Winner: 2008, 2009, 2010, 2011, 2012, 2015, 2016, 2017, 2019
- Montenegrin Cup:
  - Winner: 2008, 2009, 2010, 2011, 2012, 2015, 2016, 2017, 2019
- Liga Naţională:
  - Winner: 2013
- EHF Champions League:
  - Winner: 2007, 2012, 2014, 2015
  - Semifinalist: 2011, 2013, 2016,2017,2018
- EHF Cup Winners' Cup:
  - Winner: 2010
- European Championship:
  - Winner: 2012
- Olympic Games:
  - Silver Medalist: 2012

== Individual awards ==
- Olympic Games Top Scorer: 2012
- European Handball Championship Top Scorer: 2012
- All-Star Right Back of the Olympic Games: 2012
- All-Star Right Back of the European Championship: 2012
- Montenegrin Sportsperson of the Year: 2012, 2014
- All-Star Team of the EHF Champions League: 2014
- Team of the Tournament Right Back of the Bucharest Trophy: 2014
- EGF Hall of Fame in 2023.
