= Montenegro women's national handball team =

Montenegro

Information
- Nickname: Zlatne lavice (Golden lionesses)
- Association: Handball Federation of Montenegro
- Coach: Suzana Lazović
- Assistant coach: Igor Marković
- Captain: Đurđina Jauković
- Most caps: Jovanka Radičević (192)
- Most goals: Jovanka Radičević (1103)

Colours
1st	2nd	3rd

Results

Summer Olympics
- Appearances: 3 (First in 2012)
- Best result: (silver) 2nd (2012)

World Championship
- Appearances: 8 (First in 2011)
- Best result: 5th (2019)

European Championship
- Appearances: 8 (First in 2010)
- Best result: 1st (2012)
- Last updated on Unknown.

Montenegro women's national handball team
Medal record

Olympic Games
Silver medal – second place	2012 London	Team

European Championship
Gold medal – first place	2012 Serbia	
Bronze medal – third place	2022 Slovenia/North Macedonia/Montenegro	

Mediterranean Games
Silver medal – second place	2018 Tarragona	Team
Bronze medal – third place	2009 Pescara	Team

The Montenegro women's national handball team is the national team of Montenegro. It is governed by the Handball Federation of Montenegro and takes part in international handball competitions.

== History ==
Montenegro's women's national handball team was formed in 2006, shortly after Montenegro gained independence. It was founded upon ŽRK Budućnost Podgorica, a club with numerous European trophies, which produced many famous Montenegrin players.

=== 2006–2011 ===
Montenegro has been playing in official competitions since 2006. They played for the first time during the qualifying tournament for the 2007 World Women's Handball Championship in Cheb, where they finished second with four wins and one defeat. A year later, Montenegro did not qualify for the 2008 European Women's Handball Championship after a defeat in the playoffs against Croatia. The same result occurred at qualifiers for the 2009 World Women's Handball Championship in China, as Montenegro lost to Sweden in the playoffs.

Montenegro's first significant success came in 2010. After passing the qualifiers without any defeats, the team participated in the 2010 European Women's Handball Championship in Denmark and Norway. Montenegro finished in sixth place, with 46 goals from Montenegro's Bojana Popović.

For the first time, Montenegro played at the IHF World Women's Handball Championship in 2011. After passing the group stage, Montenegro was eliminated by Spain in the round of 16.

=== Olympic silver and European gold (2012) ===
On 11 August 2012, Montenegro won a silver medal at the 2012 Summer Olympics in London. On 16 December 2012, they became champions at the 2012 European Women's Handball Championship in Belgrade.

At the 2012 Summer Olympics, Montenegro passed the group round with two defeats but won elimination matches against France and Spain. In the final match, Montenegro was defeated by Norway 23–26. With their second place title, Montenegro won the first Olympic medal for Montenegro since their country became independent. Bojana Popović and Katarina Bulatović were prominent players on the team during this tournament.

At the 2012 European Women's Handball Championship in Serbia, Montenegro won its first title at a major handball championship. In the semi-finals, Montenegro defeated Serbia 27–26. In the finals, Montenegro defeated Norway 34–31, winning the championship. The players Katarina Bulatović and Jovanka Radičević played significant roles in the team's victory. With 56 goals, Bulatović was the top scorer of the championship.

Montenegro won both medals, in London and in Belgrade, with head coach Dragan Adžić.

=== 2013–present ===
After two successes in 2012, Montenegro was eliminated by Denmark in the round of 16 at the 2013 World Women's Handball Championship.

Montenegro did well in the 2014 European Women's Handball Championship. After making it to the semi-finals, the team was defeated by Spain. In the end, Montenegro finished in fourth place.

Montenegro made significant strides in the 2015 World Women's Handball Championship. After a notable win against Hungary 32–15, Montenegro eliminated Angola in the round of 16. However, in the quarterfinals, Norway defeated Montenegro 26–25. That was the first performance of Montenegro in the quarterfinals of a World Women's Handball Championship.

At their second appearance in the Summer Olympics, Montenegro did not perform as well, in the 2016 Rio de Janeiro Olympics. With five defeats during the group stage, Montenegro finished in nearly last place.

After the Olympics, Montenegro made big changes to the team and recruited many new young players produced by ŽRK Budućnost. The first main competition for the newly formed team was at the 2016 European Women's Handball Championship, where Montenegro had the youngest team. With one win and two defeats, the team finished in 13th place.

In November 2017, The Handball Federation of Montenegro stated that the new head coach of the national team would be Per Johansson instead of Dragan Adžić, who had served the team for seven years. As a coach, Adžić led Montenegro to nine big international competitions, winning gold during the 2012 European Championship and silver during the Summer Olympics the same year.

With a new head coach, Montenegro finished sixth in the 2017 World Women's Handball Championship, with equal wins and losses, 3–1–3. The next year, they played at the 2018 European Women's Handball Championship in France but did not succeed. After six games, Montenegro finished the tournament in ninth place.

=== 2019–2021 ===
Under head coach Per Johansson, Montenegro achieved its highest-ever ranking in a World Championship at the 2019 World Championship in Japan. The "Lionesses" finished fifth after defeating Serbia 28–26 in the placement match. Just ten days before the 2020 European Championship, Kim Rasmussen took over as head coach. Despite missing key veterans like Katarina Bulatović and Milena Raičević, the team reached the main round and finished eighth.

In 2021, under Bojana Popović, the team finished sixth at the Tokyo Olympics, but later struggled at the 2021 World Championship, finishing 22nd.

=== 2022-2023 ===
Montenegro returned to the podium at the 2022 European Championship, which they co-hosted, winning the bronze medal after defeating France 27–25 in extra time. They followed this with a seventh-place finish at the 2023 World Championship.

=== 2024–2025 ===
In early 2024, Montenegro failed to qualify for the Paris 2024 Olympic Games after losses to Germany (24–28) and Slovenia (26–30) at the Olympic Qualification Tournament.

In August 2024, Suzana Lazović was appointed head coach. At the 2024 European Championship, the team won all three preliminary round matches to top Group B, but finished fourth in their main round group after losses to Hungary, France, and Sweden, failing to reach the semi-finals.

Montenegro qualified for the 2025 World Championship by defeating Portugal 61–45 on aggregate in the European qualifiers. At the final tournament, they advanced to the quarter-finals, where they were eliminated by Norway (23–32). The team ultimately finished the tournament in eighth place.

== Competitive record ==
The Montenegrin national team has participated in many international competitions, including the Summer Olympics, World Championship and European Championship.

Tournament	Matches	Wins	Draws	Loss
Olympic Games	19	6	1	12
World Championship	52	28	2	22
European Championship	46	27	1	18
Qualifying matches EC/WC/OG	70	56	5	9
OVERALL	187	117	9	61

=== Olympic Games ===
Montenegro has participated in three Summer Olympics (2012, 2016 and 2020). In 2012, the women's handball team won the first Olympic medal for Montenegro since their independence.

Olympic Games						Qualification			
Year	Pos.	Pld	W	D	L	Pld	W	D	L
(China) 2008	Did not qualify					Did not qualify			
(United Kingdom) 2012	2nd	8	4	1	3	3	3	0	0
(Brazil) 2016	11th	5	0	0	5	3	2	1	0
(Japan) 2020	6th	6	2	0	4	2	1	0	1
(France) 2024	Did not qualify					3	1	0	2
Total		19	6	1	12	9	7	1	3

=== World Championship ===
Montenegro has participated in eight World Championships. After failing to qualify for championships 2007 and 2009, they have participated in eight consecutive tournaments. The best results Montenegro had were in 2015,2017,2019,2023 and 2025 when they played in the quarterfinals.

World Championship						Qualification			
Year	Pos.	Pld	W	D	L	Pld	W	D	L
(France) 2007	did not qualify					5	4	0	1
(China) 2009	did not qualify					7	5	1	1
(Brazil) 2011	10th	6	3	0	3	2	2	0	0
(Serbia) 2013	11th	6	4	0	2	DNP			
(Denmark) 2015	8th	9	5	1	3	2	1	1	0
(Germany) 2017	6th	7	3	1	3	2	1	0	1
(Japan) 2019	5th	9	7	0	2	2	1	0	1
(Spain) 2021	22nd	6	1	0	5	2	2	0	0
(Denmark) / (Norway) / (Sweden) 2023	7th	9	5	0	4	DNP			
(Germany) / (Netherlands) 2025	8th	6	4	0	2	2	2	0	0
(Hungary) 2027	to be determined					TBD			
(Spain) 2029	to be determined					TBD			
(Czech Republic) / (Poland) 2031	to be determined					TBD			
Total		52	31	2	19	24	18	2	4

=== European Championship ===
Montenegro has participated in eight European Championships. After having failed to qualify for the European Championship 2008, they have participated in all subsequent tournaments. Montenegro was the European champion in 2012, the bronze medalist in 2022 when was a co-host along with Slovenia and North Macedonia, and a semi-finalist in 2014.

European Championship						Qualification			
Year	Pos.	Pld	W	D	L	Pld	W	D	L
(North Macedonia) 2008	did not qualify					6	4	0	2
(Denmark) (Norway) 2010	6th	7	4	0	3	6	5	1	0
(Serbia) 2012	1st	8	7	0	1	6	5	0	1
(Croatia) (Hungary) 2014	4th	8	5	0	3	6	5	1	0
(Sweden) 2016	13th	3	1	0	2	6	5	0	1
(France) 2018	9th	6	3	0	3	6	6	0	0
(Denmark) / (Norway) 2020	8th	6	2	1	3	Cancelled			
(Slovenia) / (North Macedonia) / (Montenegro) 2022	3rd	8	5	0	3	Qualified as co-host			
(Austria) / (Hungary) / (Switzerland) 2024	8th	7	4	0	3	6	6	0	0
(Czech Republic) / (Poland) / (Romania) / (Slovakia) / (Turkey) 2026	Qualified					TBD			
(Norway) / (Denmark) / (Sweden) 2028	TBD					TBD			
(Belgium) (France) 2030	TBD					TBD			
(Denmark) (Germany) (Poland) 2032	TBD					TBD			
Total		46	27	1	18	36	30	2	4

== Team ==
=== Current squad ===
The preliminary squad for the 2026 European Women's Handball Championship.

Head coach: Suzana Lazović

No.	Pos.	Name	Date of birth (age)	Height	App.	Goals	Club
1	GK	Andrea Škerović	10 April 2004 (age 22)	1.81 m	9	0	(Montenegro) ŽRK Budućnost
2	RW	Anastasija Marsenić	24 February 2003 (age 23)	1.72 m	36	28	(Norway) Storhamar HE
6	LB	Elena Mitrović	22 December 2006 (age 19)	1.78 m	14	4	(Poland) Elmas-KPS APR Radom
9	LB	Đurđina Jauković (c)	24 February 1997 (age 29)	1.85 m	127	385	(Montenegro) ŽRK Budućnost
10	CB	Matea Šošo	24 April 1998 (age 28)	1.68 m	82	152	(Croatia) RK Podravka Koprivnica
11	P	Ivana Godeč	11 May 2001 (age 25)	1.82 m	50	51	(Montenegro) ŽRK Budućnost
12	GK	Armelle Attingré	15 January 1989 (age 37)	1.85 m	25	2	(Montenegro) ŽRK Budućnost
13	LW	Dijana Mugoša	22 October 1995 (age 31)	1.72 m	79	193	(Romania) SCM Craiova
15	RB	Jelena Vukčević	11 December 2004 (age 21)	1.70 m	31	53	(Montenegro) ŽRK Budućnost
17	CB	Nikolina Marković	26 January 2004 (age 22)	1.73 m	9	9	(France) Piraths Handball
19	LB	Mina Novović	3 May 2003 (age 23)	1.82 m	7	6	(Romania) CSM Iași 2020
22	LB	Andrijana Popović	20 April 2002 (age 24)	1.85 m	30	4	(Montenegro) ŽRK Budućnost
23	CB	Ivana Savić	2 July 2008 (age 18)	1.85 m	3	7	(Montenegro) ŽRK Budućnost
24	RB	Tanja Ivanović	5 November 1996 (age 30)	1.82 m	46	32	(Romania) CS Rapid București
33	GK	Anastasija Babović	13 December 2000 (age 25)	1.84 m	35	0	(Romania) CSM Târgu Jiu
34	P	Tatjana Brnović	9 November 1998 (age 28)	1.84 m	105	219	(Romania) CSM București
37	RW	Nina Bulatović	9 December 1996 (age 29)	1.72 m	64	87	(Montenegro) ŽRK Budućnost
71	P	Bobana Klikovac	19 July 1995 (age 31)	1.81 m	30	15	(Romania) HC Dunărea Brăila
77	LB	Nina Ramusović	18 July 2007 (age 19)	1.78 m	3	1	(Germany) BSV Sachsen Zwickau
98	LW	Mela Mehmedović	12 November 2003 (age 23)	1.70 m	3	2	(Romania) CS Rapid București

=== Current staff ===
- (Montenegro) Head Coach: Suzana Lazović
- (Montenegro) Assistant Coach: Milanka Čelebić
- (Montenegro) Assistant Coach: Draško Kaluđerović
- (Montenegro) Fitness Coach: Goran Musić
- (Montenegro) Goalkeeping Coach: Sonja Barjaktarovic
- (Montenegro) Physiotherapist: Andela Kontić Perović
- (Montenegro) Head of Delegation: Arijan Efović

=== Head coaches ===
Since independence, Montenegro has been led by six different coaches. During the first years, the head coach was Nikola Petrović. After Petrović, Montenegro was led by Gyula Zsiga and then by Dragan Adžić, who was the most successful head coach.

Coach	From	To	Record*					Championship
Coach	From	To	M	W	D	L	Win %	Championship
(Montenegro) Nikola Petrović	2006	2008	11	8	0	3	72.73	None
(Hungary) Gyula Zsiga	2008	2010	13	10	2	1	76.92	None
(Montenegro) Dragan Adžić	2010	2017	92	59	5	28	64.13	EC 2010 (6th); WC 2011 (10th); OG 2012 (2nd); EC 2012 (1st); WC 2013 (11th); EC 2014 (4th); WC 2015 (8th); OG 2016 (11th); EC 2016 (13th)
(Sweden) Per Johansson	2017	2020	30	21	1	8	70.00	WC 2017 (6th); EC 2018 (9th); WC 2019 (5th)
(Denmark) Kim Rasmussen	2020	2021	8	3	2	3	37.50	EC 2020 (8th)
(Montenegro) Bojana Popović	2021	2024	31	15	0	16	48.39	OG 2020 (6th); WC 2021 (22nd), EC 2022 (3rd), WC 2023 (7th),
(Montenegro) Suzana Lazović	2024							

* Data are only for official matches (qualifiers, European Championship, World Championship, Olympic Games).

=== Notable former players ===
- Bojana Popović
- Dragica Orlandić
- Maja Savić
- Aida Dorović
- Gabriella Markoč
- Sanja Jovović
- Radmila Petrovic
- Marija Jovanović
- Ana Đokić
- Sonja Barjaktarović
- Anđela Bulatović
- Suzana Lazović
- Ana Radović
- Katarina Bulatović
- Majda Mehmedović
- Jovanka Radičević
- Milena Raičević

=== Notable decorated players ===
Top Scorer

- Katarina Bulatović (right back) with 53 goals, 2012 Olympics; 56 goals, 2012 European Championship

All-Star Team members

- Bojana Popović (left back), 2012 Olympics
- Katarina Bulatović (right back), 2012 Olympics, 2012 European Championship
- Jovanka Radičević (right wing), 2012 European Championship, 2015 World Championship, 2019 World Championship, 2020 European Championship, 2022 European Championship
- Majda Mehmedović (left wing), 2018 European Championship
- Tatjana Brnović (Line player), 2024 European Championship

== Record against opponents ==
Since independence, Montenegro played official games against 41 different teams. The only national team against which Montenegro has never won is Brazil. Below is the list of the performances of Montenegro national handball team against every single opponent.

Opponents' country	G	W	D	L
Angola	6	5	0	1
Azerbaijan	2	2	0	0
Belarus	4	3	0	1
Bosnia and Herzegovina	1	1	0	0
Brazil	3	0	1	2
Bulgaria	3	3	0	0
Cameroon	1	1	0	0
China	1	1	0	0
Croatia	7	2	0	5
Czech Republic	9	7	0	2
Denmark	11	4	0	7
Dominican Republic	1	1	0	0
DR Congo	1	1	0	0
Finland	1	1	0	0
France	12	3	0	9
Germany	4	3	0	1
Greece	1	1	0	0
Great Britain	3	3	0	0
Hungary	5	4	0	1
Iceland	5	3	1	1
Italy	4	4	0	0
Japan	5	3	0	2
Kazakhstan	1	1	0	0
Lithuania	1	1	0	0
Netherlands	5	2	0	3
North Macedonia	2	2	0	0
Norway	7	2	0	5
Paraguay	1	1	0	0
Poland	10	9	0	1
Portugal	3	2	1	0
Romania	7	3	1	3
Russia	13	4	2	7
Senegal	2	2	0	0
Serbia	7	5	1	1
South Korea	2	2	0	0
Slovakia	6	5	0	1
Slovenia	6	5	0	1
Spain	9	4	1	4
Sweden	8	4	1	3
Switzerland	1	1	0	0
Tunisia	2	2	0	0
Turkey	2	2	0	0
Uruguay	1	1	0	0
OVERALL	187	117	9	61

As of February 2024

== See also ==
- Montenegro men's national handball team
