= Nely Carla Alberto =

Spanish handball player (born 1983)

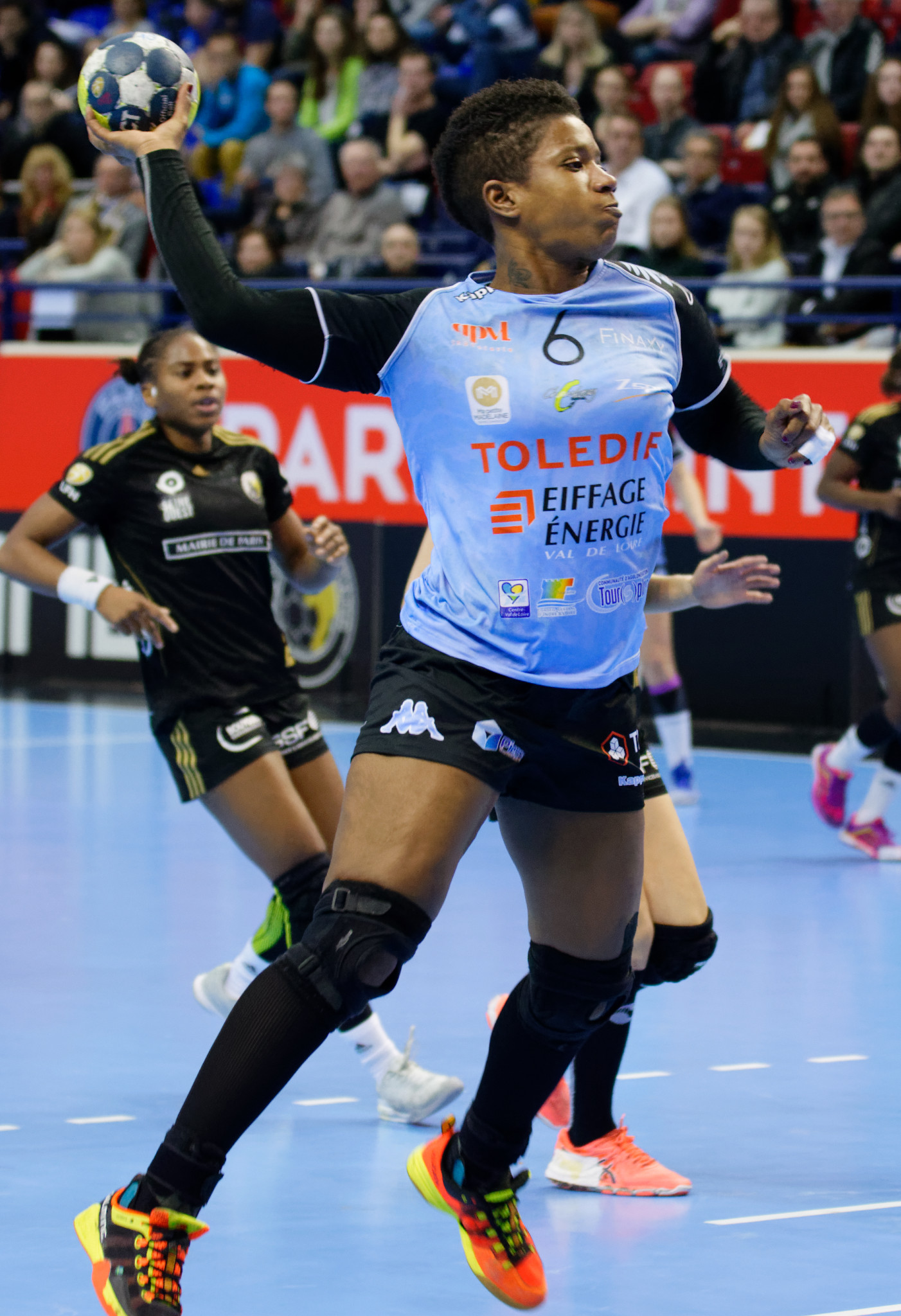

Personal information
- Full name: Nely Carla Alberto Francisca
- Nationality: Spanish
- Born: 2 July 1983 (age 43) San Sebastián, Spain
- Height: 1.79 m (5 ft 10 in)

Sport
- Sport: Handball
- Position: Left back
- Current club: Mérignac Handball
- Number: 43

Senior clubs
- Years: Team
- 2000–2001: CP Goya Almería
- 2001–2004: BM Bera Bera
- 2004–2005: Cementos la Union Ribarroja
- 2005–2010: SD Itxako
- 2010–2012: Le Havre AC
- 2012–2014: Fleury Loiret HB
- 2014–2015: Union Mios Biganos-Bègles
- 2015–2016: Brest Bretagne
- 2016–2018: Chambray Touraine
- 2018–2019: Mérignac Handball
- 2020–2021: Handball Plan-de-Cuques
National team
Years	Team	Apps	(Gls)
2004–2016	Spain	136	(346)

Teams managed
- 2021–: BM Bera Bera (assistant)
Medal record
Olympic Games
Bronze medal – third place	2012 London	Team
World Championship
Bronze medal – third place	2011 Brazil

Nely Carla Alberto Francisca (born 2 July 1983) is a Spanish former handball player and current coach, who is currently the assistant coach at BM Bera Bera. She featured in the Spain national team.

Although she was born in Spain, her parents are natives of Cape Verde, so she has dual nationality. At the 2009 World Women's Handball Championship she reached the bronze final and placed fourth with the Spanish team. She was part of the 2011 World Championship team, who were the first Spanish women's team to win a world championship handball medal. She was also part of the Olympic bronze medal-winning team from 2012.

She retired from playing in 2021 and became part of the BM Bera Bera's coaching staff.
