= Anđela Bulatović =

Montenegrin handball player (born 1987)

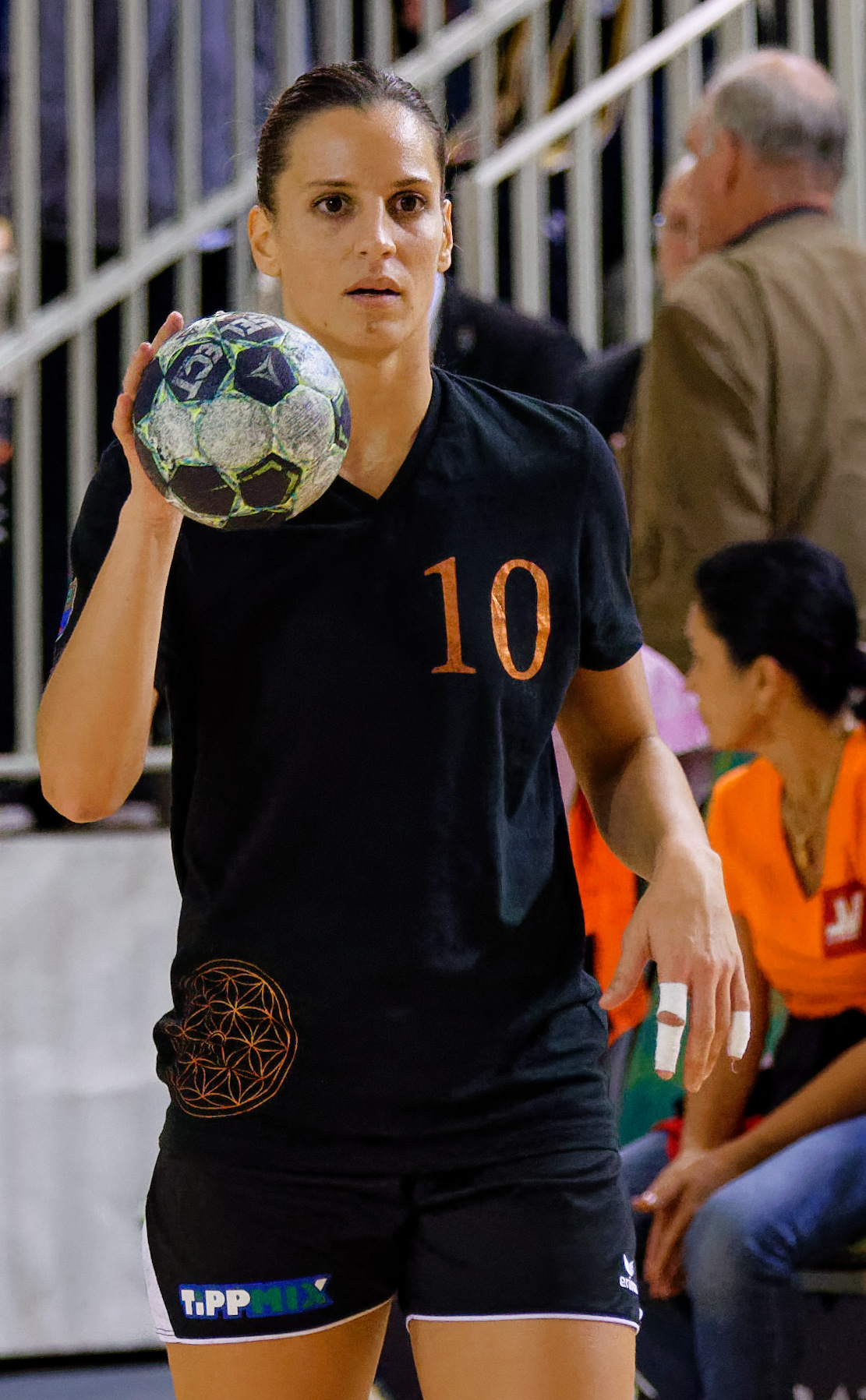

Personal information
- Nationality: Montenegrin
- Born: 15 January 1987 (age 39) Titograd, SR Montenegro, SFR Yugoslavia
- Height: 1.75 m (5 ft 9 in)

Sport
- Sport: Handball
- Position: Centre back

Senior clubs
- Years: Team
- 2004–2013: ŽRK Budućnost Podgorica
- 2013–2014: RK Krim
- 2014–2015: Rostov-Don
- 2015–2018: Érd Handball
- 2018–2019: ŽRK Budućnost Podgorica
National team
Years	Team	Apps	(Gls)
–	Montenegro	122	(177)
Medal record
Olympic Games
Silver medal – second place	2012 London	Team
European Championship
Gold medal – first place	2012 Serbia	Team
Mediterranean Games
Bronze medal – third place	2009 Pescara	Team

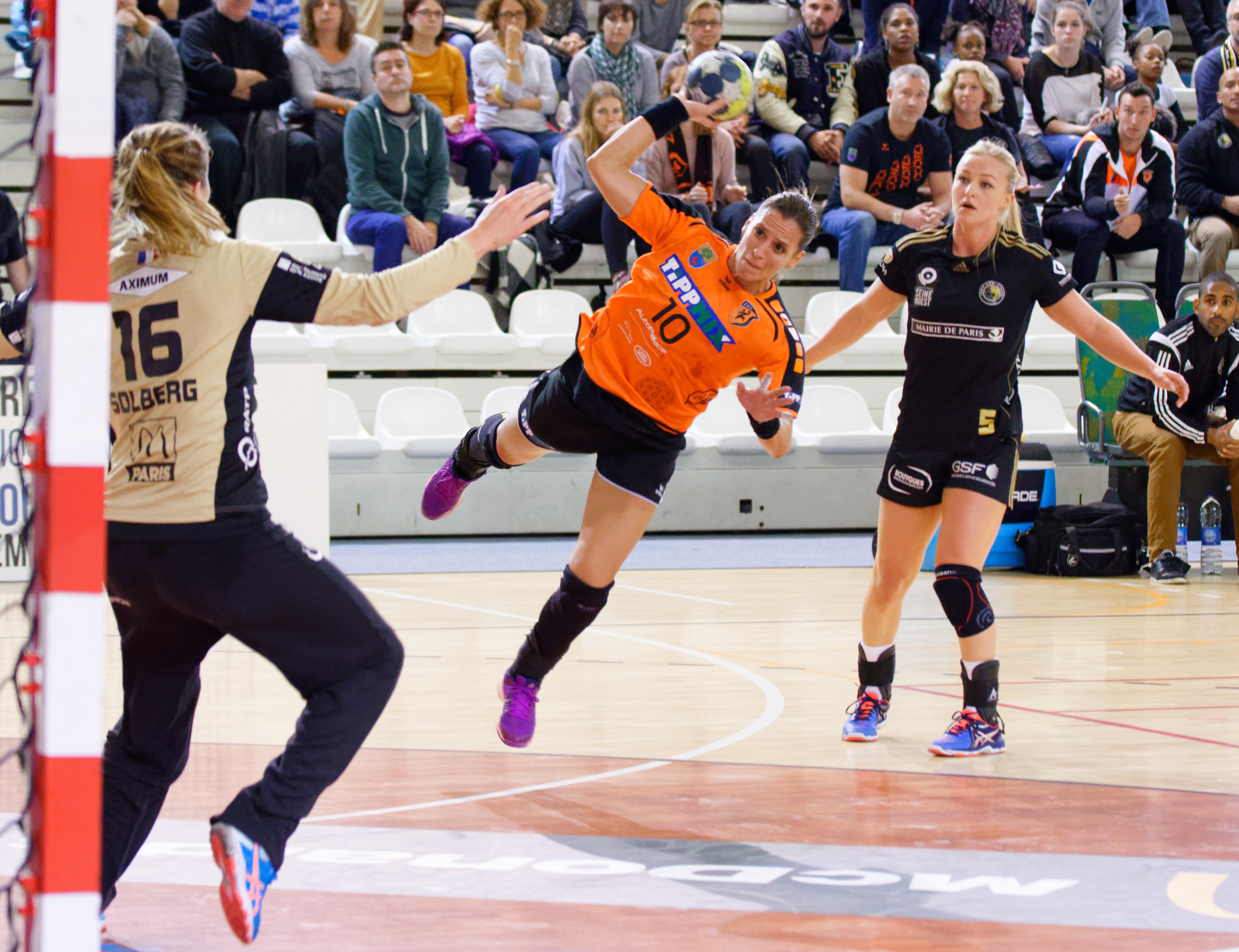
Bulatović in 2016

Anđela Bulatović née Dragutinović, (born 15 January 1987) is a retired Montenegrin handballer for ŽRK Budućnost Podgorica and the Montenegrin national team.

She was part of the Montenegrin team that won their first ever international title at the 2012 European Women's Handball Championship.

== International honours ==
- EHF Champions League:
  - Winner: 2012
- EHF Cup Winners' Cup:
  - Winner: 2006
- European Championship:
  - Winner: 2012
- Olympic Games:
  - Silver Medalist: 2012
