= Sonja Barjaktarović =

Montenegrin handball player (born 1986)

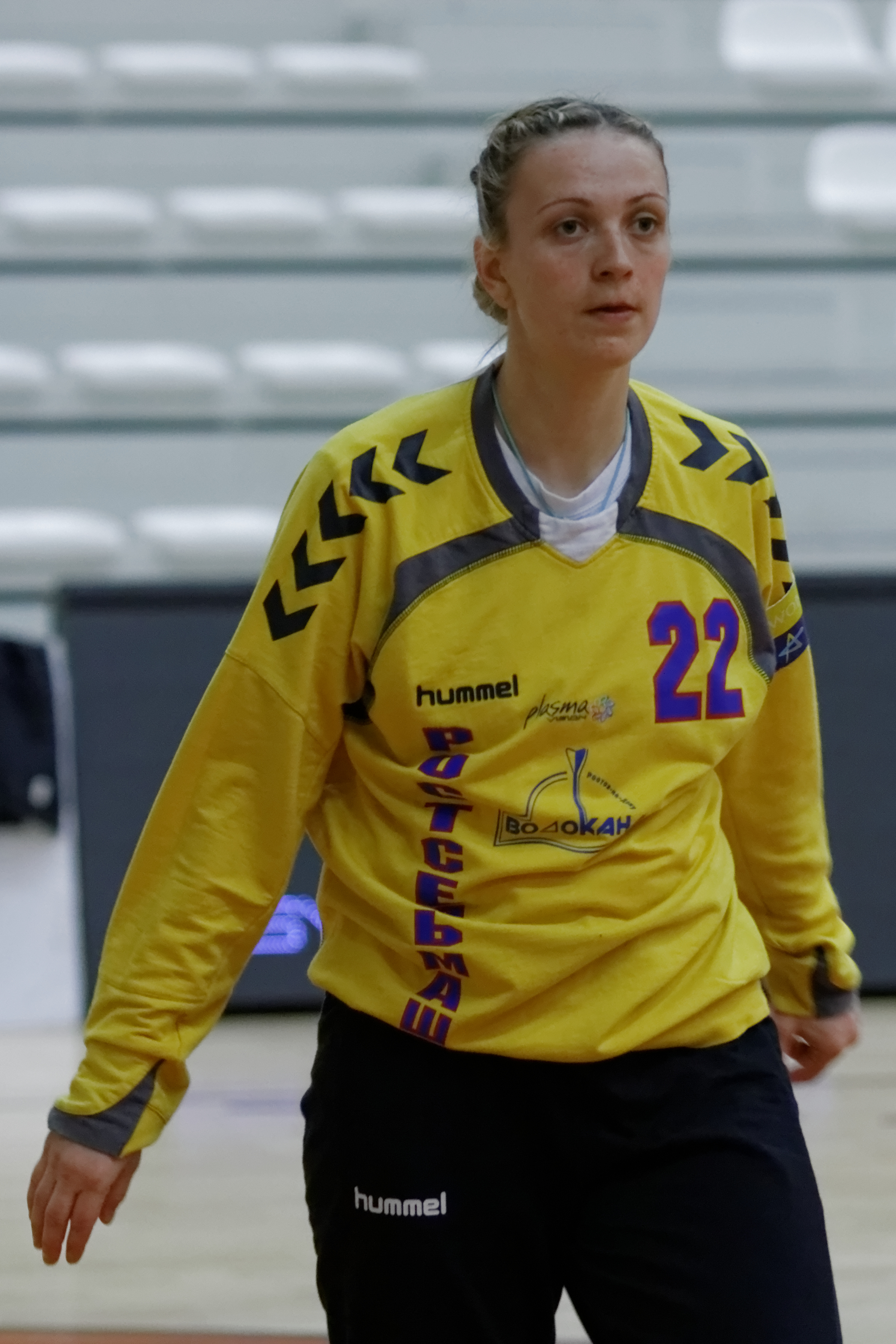

Personal information
- Nationality: Montenegrin
- Born: 11 September 1986 (age 40) Ivangrad, SR Montenegro, SFR Yugoslavia
- Height: 1.80 m (5 ft 11 in)

Sport
- Sport: Handball
- Position: Goalkeeper

Senior clubs
- Years: Team
- 2002–2004: ŽRK Berane
- 2004–2012: ŽRK Budućnost
- 2012–2015: Rostov-Don
- 2015: Bursa
- 2015–2017: Kastamonu Bld. GSK
- 2017: Alba Fehérvár KC
National team
Years	Team	Apps	(Gls)
2006–2016	Montenegro	134	(0)
Medal record
Olympic Games
Silver medal – second place	2012 London	Team
European Championship
Gold medal – first place	2012 Serbia
Mediterranean Games
Bronze medal – third place	2009 Pescara	Team

Sonja Barjaktarović (born 11 September 1986) is a retired Montenegrin handball goalkeeper. She was the first goalkeeper of the Montenegro women's national handball team and helped them to win the silver medal at the 2012 Summer Olympics. She was also part of the Montenegrin team that won their first ever international title at the 2012 European Women's Handball Championship.

== Club career ==
Barjaktarović started her handball career in Montenegrin club Berane. In 2005, she joined Budućnost with whom she won many Montenegrin Championship and Montenegrin Cup trophies. Besides winning the WRHL trophy twice, she also won the Cup Winners' Cup trophy twice - in 2006 and 2010.

== Trophies ==
Champions League

- Winner: 2011/2012

Cup Winners' Cup

- Gold: 2005/2006 and 2009/2010

Women's Regional Handball League

- Gold: 2009/2010, 2010/2011 and 2011/2012
- Silver: 2007/2008

Montenegrin Championship

- Gold: 2005/2006, 2006/2007, 2007/2008, 2008/2009, 2009/2010, 2010/11 and 2011/2012

Montenegrin Cup

- Gold: 2005/2006, 2006/2007, 2007/2008, 2008/2009, 2009/2010, 2010/11 and 2011/2012

European Championship:

- Winner: 2012
