= Handball at the 2012 Summer Olympics – Women's tournament =

Women's handball at the Games of the XXX Olympiad

Tournament details
- Host country: Great Britain
- Venue(s): Basketball Arena; Copper Box Arena
- Dates: 28 July – 11 August 2012
- Teams: 12 (from 4 confederations)

Final positions
- Champions: Norway (2nd title)
- Runner-up: Montenegro
- Third place: Spain
- Fourth place: South Korea

Tournament statistics
- Matches played: 38
- Goals scored: 1,908 (50.21 per match)
- Attendance: 185,189 (4,873 per match)
- Top scorer(s): (Montenegro) Katarina Bulatović (53 goals)

The women's handball tournament at the 2012 Olympic Games in London was held from 28 July to 11 August. The preliminaries and quarter-finals were held at the Copper Box and the semi-finals and final took place at the Basketball Arena.

Twelve nations were represented in the tournament. The four best teams from each group advanced to a knockout round, while the 5th and 6th teams in each group were classified 9th–12th by the results of their group matches. Unlike in previous Olympics, there was no placement matches involving the losing teams of the quarterfinals.

Norway won the tournament and gold medal, beating Montenegro in the final. Montenegro's silver was the first Olympic medal for the country as an independent nation, and the country's only medal at the 2012 Games. Spain won the bronze medal.

== Qualification ==
	Date	Venue	Vacancies	Qualified
Host nation			1	Great Britain
2010 European Championship	7–19 December 2010	Denmark; Norway	1	Sweden^{†}
Asian Olympic Qualification Tournament 2011	12–21 October 2011	China	1	South Korea
2011 Pan American Games	15–23 October 2011	Mexico	1	Brazil
2011 World Championship	2–18 December 2011	Brazil	1	Norway
2012 African Championship	11–20 January 2012	Morocco	1	Angola
2012 IHF Qualification Tournament #1	25–27 May 2012	France	2	Montenegro; France
2012 IHF Qualification Tournament #2	25–27 May 2012	Spain	2	Spain; Croatia
2012 IHF Qualification Tournament #3	25–27 May 2012	Denmark	2	Russia; Denmark
Total			12	

^{†} Sweden qualified as 2010 European Championship runner up because Norway qualified as the 2011 World Champion.

=== Seeding ===
Before the draw the IHF seeded the teams in six pots. The draw for the groups was held on 30 May 2012.

Pot 1	Pot 2	Pot 3	Pot 4	Pot 5	Pot 6
Norway	Spain	Denmark	France	Sweden	Angola
Montenegro	Russia	Croatia	Great Britain	Brazil	South Korea

== Group stage ==
=== Group A ===
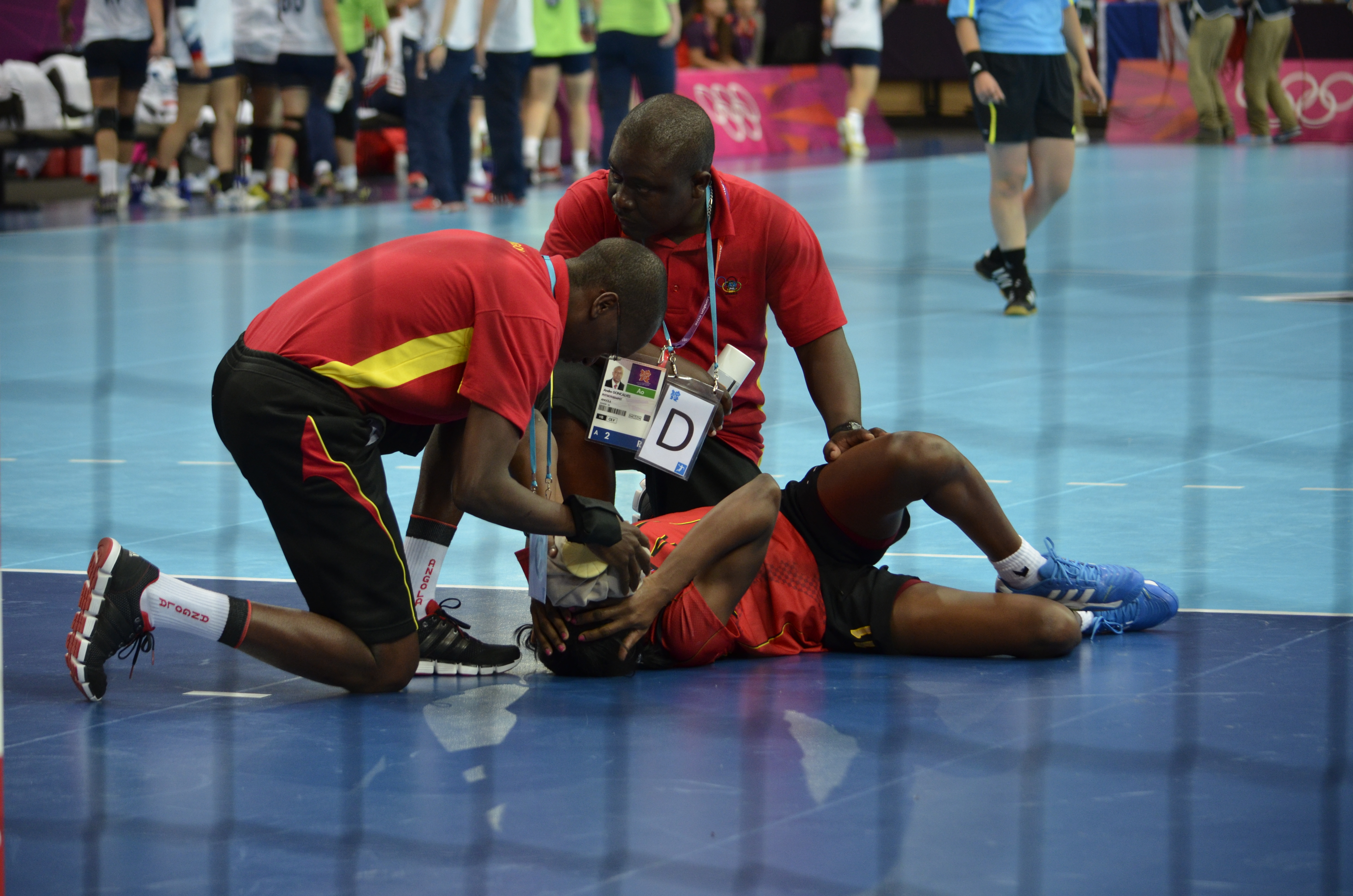
A player down during a match between Angola and Great Britain.

Team	Pld	W	D	L	GF	GA	GD	Pts	Qualification
Brazil	5	4	0	1	137	122	+15	8	Quarter-finals
Croatia	5	4	0	1	145	115	+30	8	Quarter-finals
Russia	5	3	1	1	151	125	+26	7	Quarter-finals
Montenegro	5	2	1	2	137	123	+14	5	Quarter-finals
Angola	5	1	0	4	132	142	−10	2	
Great Britain	5	0	0	5	91	166	−75	0	

28 July 2012; 09:30	Russia	30 – 27	Angola	Copper Box, London; Attendance: 3,604; Referees: Nachevski, Nikolov (MKD)
28 July 2012; 09:30	Postnova 5	(16–11)	Guialo 5	Copper Box, London; Attendance: 3,604; Referees: Nachevski, Nikolov (MKD)
28 July 2012; 09:30	3× (yellow card) 3× (suspension)	Report	3× (yellow card) 4× (suspension)	Copper Box, London; Attendance: 3,604; Referees: Nachevski, Nikolov (MKD)

28 July 2012; 14:30	Croatia	23 – 24	Brazil	Copper Box, London; Attendance: 3,942; Referees: Bonaventura, Bonaventura (FRA)
28 July 2012; 14:30	Jovetić 6	(10–9)	do Nascimento, Amorim 5	Copper Box, London; Attendance: 3,942; Referees: Bonaventura, Bonaventura (FRA)
28 July 2012; 14:30	3× (yellow card) 4× (suspension)	Report	3× (yellow card) 6× (suspension) 1× (red card)	Copper Box, London; Attendance: 3,942; Referees: Bonaventura, Bonaventura (FRA)

28 July 2012; 19:30	Montenegro	31 – 19	Great Britain	Copper Box, London; Attendance: 3,941; Referees: Duţă, Florescu (ROU)
28 July 2012; 19:30	A. Bulatović 5	(18–12)	Gerbron 6	Copper Box, London; Attendance: 3,941; Referees: Duţă, Florescu (ROU)
28 July 2012; 19:30	3× (yellow card) 4× (suspension)	Report	3× (yellow card) 5× (suspension)	Copper Box, London; Attendance: 3,941; Referees: Duţă, Florescu (ROU)

30 July 2012; 09:30	Angola	23 – 28	Croatia	Copper Box, London; Attendance: 3,892; Referees: Al-Nuaimi, Omar (UAE)
30 July 2012; 09:30	Guialo, M. Kiala 5	(11–13)	Zebić 9	Copper Box, London; Attendance: 3,892; Referees: Al-Nuaimi, Omar (UAE)
30 July 2012; 09:30	2× (yellow card) 4× (suspension)	Report	3× (yellow card) 2× (suspension)	Copper Box, London; Attendance: 3,892; Referees: Al-Nuaimi, Omar (UAE)

30 July 2012; 14:30	Great Britain	16 – 37	Russia	Copper Box, London; Attendance: 4,596; Referees: Bonaventura, Bonaventura (FRA)
30 July 2012; 14:30	Byl 5	(8–17)	Turey, Chernoivanenko 5	Copper Box, London; Attendance: 4,596; Referees: Bonaventura, Bonaventura (FRA)
30 July 2012; 14:30	3× (yellow card) 1× (suspension)	Report	2× (yellow card) 4× (suspension)	Copper Box, London; Attendance: 4,596; Referees: Bonaventura, Bonaventura (FRA)

30 July 2012; 19:30	Brazil	27 – 25	Montenegro	Copper Box, London; Attendance: 3,974; Referees: Olesen, Pedersen (DEN)
30 July 2012; 19:30	do Nascimento 8	(15–16)	K. Bulatović 5	Copper Box, London; Attendance: 3,974; Referees: Olesen, Pedersen (DEN)
30 July 2012; 19:30	3× (yellow card) 4× (suspension) 1× (red card)	Report	3× (yellow card) 7× (suspension) 1× (red card)	Copper Box, London; Attendance: 3,974; Referees: Olesen, Pedersen (DEN)

1 August 2012; 11:15	Montenegro	30 – 25	Angola	Copper Box, London; Attendance: 4,354; Referees: Abdulla, Bamutref (QAT)
1 August 2012; 11:15	Popović, K. Bulatović 6	(13–14)	Carlos 7	Copper Box, London; Attendance: 4,354; Referees: Abdulla, Bamutref (QAT)
1 August 2012; 11:15	3× (yellow card) 3× (suspension)	Report	3× (yellow card) 3× (suspension)	Copper Box, London; Attendance: 4,354; Referees: Abdulla, Bamutref (QAT)

1 August 2012; 16:15	Great Britain	17 – 30	Brazil	Copper Box, London; Attendance: 4,622; Referees: Coulibaly, Diabate (CIV)
1 August 2012; 16:15	Byl, Gerbron 5	(8–17)	Rodrigues 7	Copper Box, London; Attendance: 4,622; Referees: Coulibaly, Diabate (CIV)
1 August 2012; 16:15	2× (yellow card) 3× (suspension)	Report	3× (yellow card) 3× (suspension)	Copper Box, London; Attendance: 4,622; Referees: Coulibaly, Diabate (CIV)

1 August 2012; 21:15	Russia	28 – 30	Croatia	Copper Box, London; Attendance: 4,098; Referees: Marina, Minore (ARG)
1 August 2012; 21:15	Turey 6	(15–15)	Penezić 10	Copper Box, London; Attendance: 4,098; Referees: Marina, Minore (ARG)
1 August 2012; 21:15	3× (yellow card) 5× (suspension)	Report	3× (yellow card) 6× (suspension)	Copper Box, London; Attendance: 4,098; Referees: Marina, Minore (ARG)

3 August 2012; 09:30	Angola	31 – 25	Great Britain	Copper Box, London; Attendance: 4,081; Referees: Florescu, Duţă (ROU)
3 August 2012; 09:30	Almeida 8	(14–10)	Gerbron 9	Copper Box, London; Attendance: 4,081; Referees: Florescu, Duţă (ROU)
3 August 2012; 09:30	2× (yellow card) 3× (suspension)	Report	3× (yellow card) 1× (suspension)	Copper Box, London; Attendance: 4,081; Referees: Florescu, Duţă (ROU)

3 August 2012; 14:30	Croatia	27 – 26	Montenegro	Copper Box, London; Attendance: 4,541; Referees: Lopez, Sabroso (ESP)
3 August 2012; 14:30	Penezić 10	(12–12)	Popović 10	Copper Box, London; Attendance: 4,541; Referees: Lopez, Sabroso (ESP)
3 August 2012; 14:30	3× (yellow card) 5× (suspension)	Report	2× (yellow card) 4× (suspension)	Copper Box, London; Attendance: 4,541; Referees: Lopez, Sabroso (ESP)

3 August 2012; 16:15	Russia	31 – 27	Brazil	Copper Box, London; Attendance: 4,741; Referees: Lazaar, Reveret (FRA)
3 August 2012; 16:15	Turey 7	(15–14)	Nascimento 9	Copper Box, London; Attendance: 4,741; Referees: Lazaar, Reveret (FRA)
3 August 2012; 16:15	3× (yellow card) 7× (suspension)	Report	2× (yellow card) 2× (suspension)	Copper Box, London; Attendance: 4,741; Referees: Lazaar, Reveret (FRA)

5 August 2012; 11:15	Brazil	29 – 26	Angola	Copper Box, London; Attendance: 4,585; Referees: Bartlett, Stokes (GBR)
5 August 2012; 11:15	three players 5	(14–9)	Kiala 6	Copper Box, London; Attendance: 4,585; Referees: Bartlett, Stokes (GBR)
5 August 2012; 11:15	3× (yellow card) 1× (suspension)	Report	3× (yellow card) 3× (suspension)	Copper Box, London; Attendance: 4,585; Referees: Bartlett, Stokes (GBR)

5 August 2012; 14:30	Montenegro	25 – 25	Russia	Copper Box, London; Attendance: 4,444; Referees: Abrahamsen, Kristiansen (NOR)
5 August 2012; 14:30	Bulatović 7	(15–16)	three players 4	Copper Box, London; Attendance: 4,444; Referees: Abrahamsen, Kristiansen (NOR)
5 August 2012; 14:30	2× (yellow card) 6× (suspension)	Report	2× (yellow card) 8× (suspension) 1× (red card)	Copper Box, London; Attendance: 4,444; Referees: Abrahamsen, Kristiansen (NOR)

5 August 2012; 16:15	Croatia	37 – 14	Great Britain	Copper Box, London; Attendance: 4,792; Referees: Marina, Minore (ARG)
5 August 2012; 16:15	three players 5	(17–6)	Fairbrother 3	Copper Box, London; Attendance: 4,792; Referees: Marina, Minore (ARG)
5 August 2012; 16:15	3× (yellow card) 3× (suspension)	Report	3× (yellow card) 4× (suspension)	Copper Box, London; Attendance: 4,792; Referees: Marina, Minore (ARG)

=== Group B ===
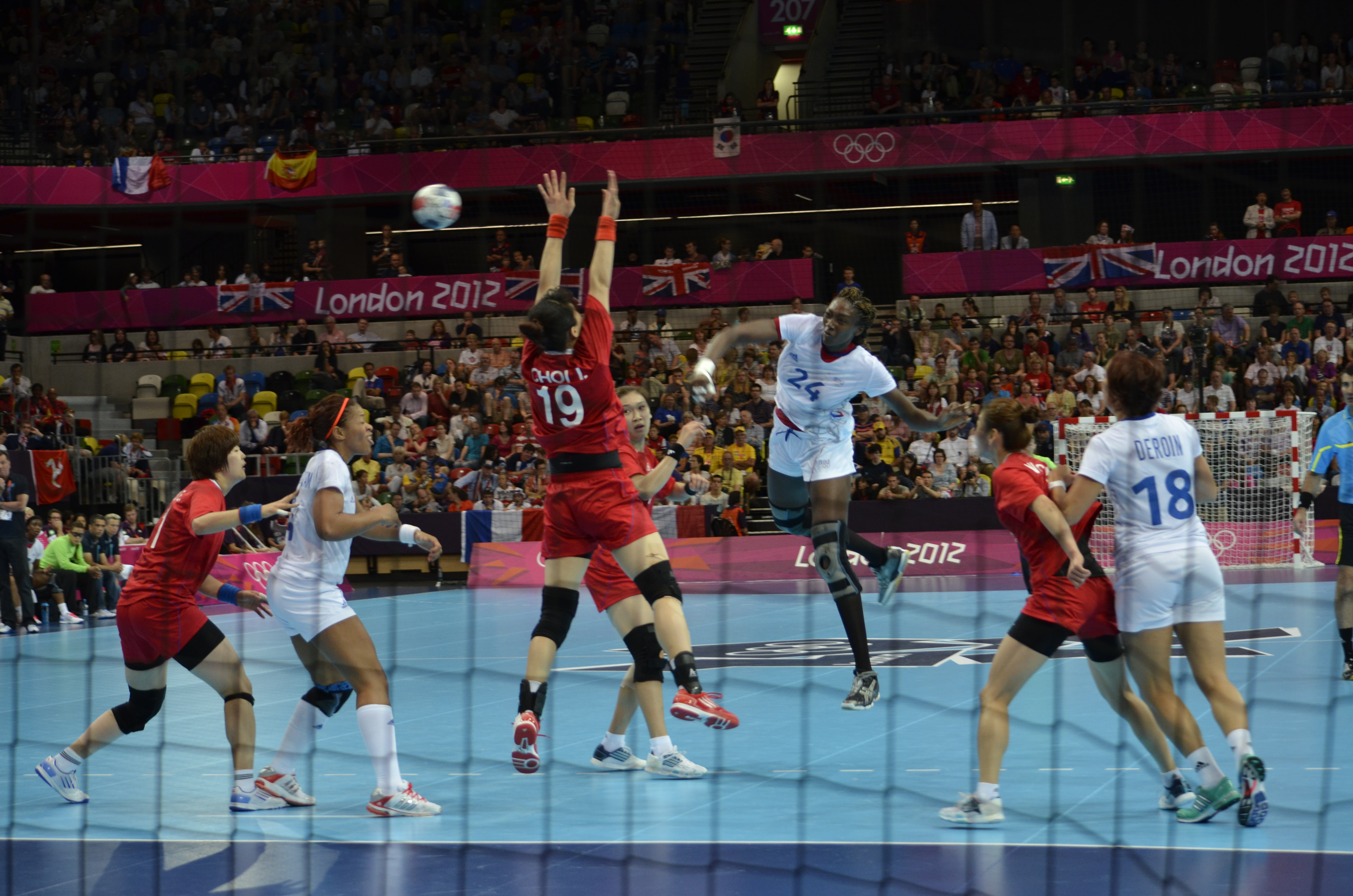
South Korea v France

Team	Pld	W	D	L	GF	GA	GD	Pts	Qualification
France	5	4	1	0	125	103	+22	9	Quarter-finals
South Korea	5	3	1	1	136	130	+6	7	Quarter-finals
Spain	5	3	1	1	119	114	+5	7	Quarter-finals
Norway	5	2	1	2	118	120	−2	5	Quarter-finals
Denmark	5	1	0	4	113	121	−8	2	
Sweden	5	0	0	5	108	131	−23	0	

28 July 2012; 11:15	Spain	27 – 31	South Korea	Copper Box, London; Attendance: 3,900; Referees: Gubica, Milošević (CRO)
28 July 2012; 11:15	Martín 7	(12–16)	Ryu Eun-hee 9	Copper Box, London; Attendance: 3,900; Referees: Gubica, Milošević (CRO)
28 July 2012; 11:15	3× (yellow card) 2× (suspension)	Report	3× (yellow card) 3× (suspension)	Copper Box, London; Attendance: 3,900; Referees: Gubica, Milošević (CRO)

28 July 2012; 16:15	Denmark	21 – 18	Sweden	Copper Box, London; Attendance: 3,942; Referees: Nikolić, Stojković (SRB)
28 July 2012; 16:15	Skov 6	(8–10)	Gulldén 5	Copper Box, London; Attendance: 3,942; Referees: Nikolić, Stojković (SRB)
28 July 2012; 16:15	3× (yellow card) 4× (suspension)	Report	4× (yellow card) 3× (suspension)	Copper Box, London; Attendance: 3,942; Referees: Nikolić, Stojković (SRB)

28 July 2012; 21:15	Norway	23 – 24	France	Copper Box, London; Attendance: 3,968; Referees: Krstić, Ljubić (SLO)
28 July 2012; 21:15	Alstad 5	(12–17)	Baudouin, Signaté 5	Copper Box, London; Attendance: 3,968; Referees: Krstić, Ljubić (SLO)
28 July 2012; 21:15	3× (yellow card) 2× (suspension)	Report	4× (yellow card) 5× (suspension) 1× (red card)	Copper Box, London; Attendance: 3,968; Referees: Krstić, Ljubić (SLO)

30 July 2012; 11:15	South Korea	25 – 24	Denmark	Copper Box, London; Attendance: 4,393; Referees: Duţă, Florescu (ROU)
30 July 2012; 11:15	Jo Hyo-bi 5	(11–10)	Larsen 7	Copper Box, London; Attendance: 4,393; Referees: Duţă, Florescu (ROU)
30 July 2012; 11:15	3× (yellow card) 1× (suspension)	Report	3× (yellow card) 2× (suspension)	Copper Box, London; Attendance: 4,393; Referees: Duţă, Florescu (ROU)

30 July 2012; 16:15	France	18 – 18	Spain	Copper Box, London; Attendance: 4,671; Referees: Horáček, Novotný (CZE)
30 July 2012; 16:15	Dembélé 6	(7–10)	Mangué 6	Copper Box, London; Attendance: 4,671; Referees: Horáček, Novotný (CZE)
30 July 2012; 16:15	3× (yellow card) 6× (suspension) 1× (red card)	Report	4× (yellow card) 4× (suspension)	Copper Box, London; Attendance: 4,671; Referees: Horáček, Novotný (CZE)

30 July 2012; 21:15	Sweden	21 – 24	Norway	Copper Box, London; Attendance: 4,459; Referees: Coulibaly, Diabate (CIV)
30 July 2012; 21:15	Torstenson 6	(9–14)	Koren, Sulland 5	Copper Box, London; Attendance: 4,459; Referees: Coulibaly, Diabate (CIV)
30 July 2012; 21:15	3× (yellow card) 3× (suspension)	Report	3× (yellow card) 3× (suspension)	Copper Box, London; Attendance: 4,459; Referees: Coulibaly, Diabate (CIV)

1 August 2012; 09:30	Norway	27 – 27	South Korea	Copper Box, London; Attendance: 4,178; Referees: Nachevski, Nikolov (MKD)
1 August 2012; 09:30	Sulland 11	(13–15)	three players 6	Copper Box, London; Attendance: 4,178; Referees: Nachevski, Nikolov (MKD)
1 August 2012; 09:30	3× (yellow card)	Report	2× (yellow card) 3× (suspension)	Copper Box, London; Attendance: 4,178; Referees: Nachevski, Nikolov (MKD)

1 August 2012; 14:30	France	29 – 17	Sweden	Copper Box, London; Attendance: 4,638; Referees: Gubica, Milošević (CRO)
1 August 2012; 14:30	three players 4	(16–11)	Ahlm 6	Copper Box, London; Attendance: 4,638; Referees: Gubica, Milošević (CRO)
1 August 2012; 14:30	3× (yellow card) 2× (suspension)	Report	3× (yellow card) 1× (suspension)	Copper Box, London; Attendance: 4,638; Referees: Gubica, Milošević (CRO)

1 August 2012; 19:30	Spain	24 – 21	Denmark	Copper Box, London; Attendance: 4,488; Referees: Geipel, Helbig (GER)
1 August 2012; 19:30	Mangué 7	(14–9)	Nørgaard 7	Copper Box, London; Attendance: 4,488; Referees: Geipel, Helbig (GER)
1 August 2012; 19:30	3× (yellow card) 3× (suspension) 1× (red card)	Report	3× (yellow card) 1× (suspension)	Copper Box, London; Attendance: 4,488; Referees: Geipel, Helbig (GER)

3 August 2012; 11:15	South Korea	21 – 24	France	Copper Box, London; Attendance: 4,568; Referees: Nikolić, Stojković (SRB)
3 August 2012; 11:15	Sim Hae-in 6	(12–10)	Lacrabère 4	Copper Box, London; Attendance: 4,568; Referees: Nikolić, Stojković (SRB)
3 August 2012; 11:15	2× (yellow card) 3× (suspension)	Report	4× (yellow card) 2× (suspension)	Copper Box, London; Attendance: 4,568; Referees: Nikolić, Stojković (SRB)

3 August 2012; 19:30	Spain	25 – 24	Sweden	Copper Box, London; Attendance: 4,234; Referees: Al-Nuaimi, Omar (UAE)
3 August 2012; 19:30	Mangué, Alberto 6	(11–10)	Fogelström 5	Copper Box, London; Attendance: 4,234; Referees: Al-Nuaimi, Omar (UAE)
3 August 2012; 19:30	3× (yellow card) 3× (suspension)	Report	4× (yellow card) 2× (suspension)	Copper Box, London; Attendance: 4,234; Referees: Al-Nuaimi, Omar (UAE)

3 August 2012; 21:15	Denmark	23 – 24	Norway	Copper Box, London; Attendance: 4,720; Referees: Horáček, Novotný (CZE)
3 August 2012; 21:15	Nørgaard 9	(11–12)	Løke 6	Copper Box, London; Attendance: 4,720; Referees: Horáček, Novotný (CZE)
3 August 2012; 21:15	3× (yellow card) 2× (suspension)	Report	3× (yellow card)	Copper Box, London; Attendance: 4,720; Referees: Horáček, Novotný (CZE)

5 August 2012; 09:30	Sweden	28 – 32	South Korea	Copper Box, London; Attendance: 4,180; Referees: Abdulla, Bamutref (QAT)
5 August 2012; 09:30	Flognman 8	(13–16)	Ryu Eun-hee 10	Copper Box, London; Attendance: 4,180; Referees: Abdulla, Bamutref (QAT)
5 August 2012; 09:30	4× (yellow card) 4× (suspension)	Report	3× (yellow card) 5× (suspension)	Copper Box, London; Attendance: 4,180; Referees: Abdulla, Bamutref (QAT)

5 August 2012; 19:30	Norway	20 – 25	Spain	Copper Box, London; Attendance: 4,345; Referees: Krstić, Ljubić (SLO)
5 August 2012; 19:30	Koren 6	(11–11)	Alonso 7	Copper Box, London; Attendance: 4,345; Referees: Krstić, Ljubić (SLO)
5 August 2012; 19:30	3× (yellow card) 4× (suspension)	Report	3× (yellow card) 4× (suspension) 1× (red card)	Copper Box, London; Attendance: 4,345; Referees: Krstić, Ljubić (SLO)

5 August 2012; 21:15	Denmark	24 – 30	France	Copper Box, London; Attendance: 4,616; Referees: Duţă, Florescu (ROU)
5 August 2012; 21:15	Nørgaard 10	(10–17)	Nijtam 6	Copper Box, London; Attendance: 4,616; Referees: Duţă, Florescu (ROU)
5 August 2012; 21:15	3× (yellow card) 2× (suspension)	Report	2× (yellow card) 1× (suspension)	Copper Box, London; Attendance: 4,616; Referees: Duţă, Florescu (ROU)

== Knockout stage ==
Quarter-finals
A1	Brazil	19
B4	Norway	21
A3	Russia	23
B2	South Korea	24
A2	Croatia	22
B3	Spain	25
A4	Montenegro	23
B1	France	22

Semi-finals
B4	Norway	31
B2	South Korea	25
B3	Spain	26
A4	Montenegro	27

Gold medal match
B4	Norway	26
A4	Montenegro	23
Bronze medal match
B2	South Korea	29
B3	Spain (ET)	31

=== Quarter-finals ===
7 August 2012; 10:00	Brazil	19 – 21	Norway	Copper Box, London; Attendance: 4,549; Referees: Bonaventura, Bonaventura (FRA)
7 August 2012; 10:00	do Nascimento 5	(13–9)	Koren 5	Copper Box, London; Attendance: 4,549; Referees: Bonaventura, Bonaventura (FRA)
7 August 2012; 10:00	3× (yellow card) 3× (suspension)	Report	2× (yellow card) 1× (suspension)	Copper Box, London; Attendance: 4,549; Referees: Bonaventura, Bonaventura (FRA)

7 August 2012; 13:30	Spain	25 – 22	Croatia	Copper Box, London; Attendance: 4,553; Referees: Horáček, Novotný (CZE)
7 August 2012; 13:30	Pinedo 7	(13–12)	Tatari 5	Copper Box, London; Attendance: 4,553; Referees: Horáček, Novotný (CZE)
7 August 2012; 13:30	3× (yellow card) 3× (suspension)	Report	3× (yellow card) 6× (suspension)	Copper Box, London; Attendance: 4,553; Referees: Horáček, Novotný (CZE)

7 August 2012; 17:00	Russia	23 – 24	South Korea	Copper Box, London; Attendance: 4,299; Referees: Lopéz, Sabroso (ESP)
7 August 2012; 17:00	Postnova, Levina 5	(11–14)	Gwon Han-na 6	Copper Box, London; Attendance: 4,299; Referees: Lopéz, Sabroso (ESP)
7 August 2012; 17:00	4× (yellow card) 2× (suspension)	Report	3× (yellow card) 5× (suspension)	Copper Box, London; Attendance: 4,299; Referees: Lopéz, Sabroso (ESP)

7 August 2012; 20:30	France	22 – 23	Montenegro	Copper Box, London; Attendance: 4,559; Referees: Olesen, Pedersen (DEN)
7 August 2012; 20:30	Signaté 5	(13–13)	Popović, Bulatović 6	Copper Box, London; Attendance: 4,559; Referees: Olesen, Pedersen (DEN)
7 August 2012; 20:30	3× (yellow card) 2× (suspension)	Report	4× (yellow card) 3× (suspension)	Copper Box, London; Attendance: 4,559; Referees: Olesen, Pedersen (DEN)

=== Semi-finals ===
9 August 2012; 17:00	Norway	31 – 25	South Korea	Basketball Arena, London; Attendance: 9,274; Referees: Gubica, Milošević (CRO)
9 August 2012; 17:00	Løke 8	(18–15)	Gwon Han-na 7	Basketball Arena, London; Attendance: 9,274; Referees: Gubica, Milošević (CRO)
9 August 2012; 17:00	3× (yellow card) 2× (suspension)	Report	3× (yellow card) 2× (suspension)	Basketball Arena, London; Attendance: 9,274; Referees: Gubica, Milošević (CRO)

9 August 2012; 20:30	Spain	26 – 27	Montenegro	Basketball Arena, London; Attendance: 9,087; Referees: Krstić, Ljubić (SLO)
9 August 2012; 20:30	Alberto 6	(13–13)	Bulatović 9	Basketball Arena, London; Attendance: 9,087; Referees: Krstić, Ljubić (SLO)
9 August 2012; 20:30	2× (yellow card) 1× (suspension)	Report	3× (yellow card) 4× (suspension)	Basketball Arena, London; Attendance: 9,087; Referees: Krstić, Ljubić (SLO)

=== Bronze medal match ===
11 August 2012
17:00
South Korea
29 – 31 (ET)
Spain
Basketball Arena, London
Attendance: 9,622
Referees: Olesen, Pedersen (DEN)
Gwon Han-na 7
(13–13)
Alberto, Fernández 5
1× (yellow card) 2× (suspension)
Report
2× (yellow card) 4× (suspension)

FT: 24–24 ET: 4–4, 1–3

=== Gold medal match ===
11 August 2012; 20:30	Norway	26 – 23	Montenegro	Basketball Arena, London; Attendance: 9,739; Referees: Bonaventura, Bonaventura (FRA)
11 August 2012; 20:30	Sulland 10	(13–10)	Bulatović 10	Basketball Arena, London; Attendance: 9,739; Referees: Bonaventura, Bonaventura (FRA)
11 August 2012; 20:30	3× (yellow card) 3× (suspension)	Report	3× (yellow card) 7× (suspension) 1× (red card)	Basketball Arena, London; Attendance: 9,739; Referees: Bonaventura, Bonaventura (FRA)

== Rankings and statistics ==
=== Final ranking ===
Rank	Team	Points	GD
1st place, gold medalist(s)	Norway	11	+9
2nd place, silver medalist(s)	Montenegro	9	+13
3rd place, bronze medalist(s)	Spain	11	+9
4	South Korea	9	–1
5	France	9	+21
6	Brazil	8	+13
7	Croatia	8	+27
8	Russia	7	+25
9	Denmark	2	–8
10	Angola	2	–10
11	Sweden	0	–23
12	Great Britain	0	–75

=== All-star team ===
- Goalkeeper: (Norway) Kari Aalvik Grimsbo
- Left wing: (South Korea) Jo Hyo-bi
- Left back: (Montenegro) Bojana Popović
- Central back: (Spain) Marta Mangué
- Right back: (Montenegro) Katarina Bulatović
- Right wing: (Brazil) Alexandra do Nascimento
- Line player: (Norway) Heidi Løke

Chosen by team officials and IHF experts: IHF.info

=== Top goalkeepers ===
Rank	Name	Team	%	Saves	Shots
1	Kari Aalvik Grimsbø	Norway	42%	67	161
2	Cléopatre Darleux	France	41%	18	44
3	Amandine Leynaud	France	38%	61	161
4	Silvia Navarro	Spain	37%	96	258
4	Mayssa Pessoa	Brazil	37%	21	57
4	Anna Sedoykina	Russia	37%	34	92
7	Ivana Jelčić	Croatia	35%	62	177
8	Sonja Barjaktarović	Montenegro	34%	55	161
8	Ju Hui	South Korea	34%	99	292
10	Karin Mortensen	Denmark	33%	27	82

=== Top goalscorers ===
Rank	Name	Team	Goals	Shots	%
1	Katarina Bulatović	Montenegro	53	93	57%
2	Bojana Popović	Montenegro	46	77	60%
3	Ryu Eun-hee	South Korea	43	92	47%
4	Alexandra do Nascimento	Brazil	37	55	67%
5	Marta Mangué	Spain	34	67	51%
6	Nely Carla Alberto	Spain	33	58	57%
6	Linn Jørum Sulland	Norway	33	66	50%
8	Jo Hyo-bi	South Korea	32	52	62%
8	Ann Grete Nørgaard	Denmark	32	52	62%
10	Linn-Kristin Riegelhuth Koren	Norway	31	39	79%
10	Andrea Penezić	Croatia	31	55	56%
10	Jovanka Radičević	Montenegro	31	51	61%
