= Handball at the 2012 Summer Olympics – Women's team rosters =

This article shows the rosters of all participating teams at the women's handball tournament at the 2012 Summer Olympics in London.

== Group A ==
=== Angola ===
The following is the Angola roster in the women's handball tournament of the 2012 Summer Olympics.

Head coaches: Vivaldo Eduardo

No.	Pos.	Name	Date of birth (age)	Height	App.	Goals	Club
1	GK	Neide Barbosa	23 September 1980 (aged 31)	1.78 m			(Angola) Petro Atlético
2	LW	Joelma Viegas	15 October 1986 (aged 25)	1.68 m			(Angola) 1º de Agosto
7	RW	Carolina Morais	13 April 1986 (aged 26)	1.67 m			(Angola) 1º de Agosto
8	LB	Nair Almeida	23 January 1984 (aged 28)	1.80 m			(Angola) 1º de Agosto
9	CB	Isabel Guialo	8 April 1980 (aged 32)	1.68 m			(Angola) ASA
10	LB	Isabel Fernandes	5 June 1985 (aged 27)	1.80 m			(Angola) Petro Atlético
11	RB	Luisa Kiala	25 January 1982 (aged 30)	1.79 m			(Angola) Petro Atlético
12	GK	Cristina Direito	15 March 1985 (aged 27)	1.66 m			(Angola) 1º de Agosto
14	LW	Natalia Bernardo	25 December 1986 (aged 25)	1.70 m			(Angola) Petro Atlético
15	RB	Azenaide Carlos	14 June 1990 (aged 22)	1.74 m			(Angola) 1º de Agosto
17	P	Ana Barros	16 February 1993 (aged 19)	1.73 m			(Angola) Petro Atlético
18	CB	Marcelina Kiala	9 November 1979 (aged 32)	1.77 m			(Angola) Petro Atlético
20	RW	Marta Santos	25 December 1988 (aged 23)	1.58 m			(Angola) Petro Atlético
21	LB	Magda Cazanga	28 May 1991 (aged 21)	1.72 m			(Angola) Petro Atlético

=== Brazil ===
The following is the Brazilian roster in the women's handball tournament of the 2012 Summer Olympics.

Head coach: (Denmark) Morten Soubak

No.	Pos.	Name	Date of birth (age)	Height	App.	Goals	Club
1	GK	Chana Masson	18 December 1978 (aged 33)	1.83 m			(Denmark) Randers HK
2	P	Fabiana Diniz	13 May 1981 (aged 31)	1.83 m			(Spain) Bera Bera BM
3	RW	Alexandra do Nascimento	16 September 1981 (aged 30)	1.77 m			(Austria) Hypo
4	LW	Samira Rocha	26 January 1989 (aged 23)	1.70 m			(Austria) Hypo
5	P	Daniela Piedade	2 March 1979 (aged 33)	1.73 m			(Austria) Hypo
8	LW	Fernanda da Silva	25 September 1989 (aged 22)	1.76 m			(Austria) Hypo
9	CB	Ana Paula Belo	18 October 1987 (aged 24)	1.72 m			(Austria) Hypo
10	LW	Jéssica Quintino	17 April 1991 (aged 21)	1.76 m			(Brazil) A.D. Blumenau
15	LB	Silvia Pinheiro	11 January 1981 (aged 31)	1.78 m			(Austria) Hypo
16	GK	Mayssa Pessoa	11 August 1984 (aged 27)	1.80 m			(France) Issy-Paris Hand
18	LB	Eduarda Amorim	23 September 1986 (aged 25)	1.86 m			(Hungary) Győri ETO KC
20	RB	Francine Moraes	1 January 1981 (aged 31)	1.72 m			(Austria) Hypo
22	CB	Mayara Moura	5 December 1986 (aged 25)	1.70 m			(France) Mios Bigamos HB
81	RB	Deonise Cavaleiro	20 June 1983 (aged 29)	1.80 m			(Spain) SD Itxako

=== Croatia ===
The following is the Croatia roster in the women's handball tournament of the 2012 Summer Olympics.

Head coaches: Vladimir Canjuga

No.	Pos.	Name	Date of birth (age)	Height	App.	Goals	Club
1	GK	Jelena Grubišić	20 January 1987 (aged 25)	1.84 m			(Slovenia) RK Krim
2	CB	Miranda Tatari	20 September 1983 (aged 28)	1.74 m			(Croatia) Podravka Koprivnica
5	LW	Dijana Jovetić	21 May 1984 (aged 28)	1.70 m			(Montenegro) ŽRK Budućnost
6	P	Andrea Šerić	3 August 1985 (aged 26)	1.84 m			(Slovenia) RK Krim
8	LW	Anita Gaće	14 April 1983 (aged 29)	1.77 m			(Croatia) Podravka Koprivnica
10	RW	Nikica Pušić-Koroljević	19 March 1983 (aged 29)	1.77 m			(Croatia) Podravka Koprivnica
13	LB	Lidija Horvat	5 May 1982 (aged 30)	1.84 m			(Croatia) Podravka Koprivnica
14	RB	Kristina Franić	22 May 1987 (aged 25)	1.80 m			(Slovenia) RK Krim
15	RB	Andrea Penezić	13 November 1985 (aged 26)	1.86 m			(Slovenia) RK Krim
16	GK	Ivana Jelčić	16 March 1980 (aged 32)	1.80 m			(Croatia) Podravka Koprivnica
18	CB	Ivana Lovrić	1 September 1984 (aged 27)	1.73 m			(Croatia) RK Samobor
19	RW	Maja Zebić	31 May 1982 (aged 30)	1.78 m			(Spain) SD Itxako
20	P	Vesna Milanović-Litre	30 May 1986 (aged 26)	1.80 m			(Croatia) Podravka Koprivnica
29	RB	Sonja Bašić	26 November 1987 (aged 24)	1.82 m			(Croatia) Lokomotiva Zagreb

=== Great Britain ===
The following is the British roster in the women's handball tournament of the 2012 Summer Olympics.

Head coaches: Jesper Holmris, Vigdis Holmeset

No.	Pos.	Name	Date of birth (age)	Height	App.	Goals	Club
1	GK	Sarah Hargreaves	17 May 1989 (aged 23)	1.85 m	0	0	(Denmark) Slagelse FH
3	LW	Holly Lam-Moores	12 September 1990 (aged 21)	1.69 m	0	0	(United Kingdom) GB Handball
4	RW	Zoe van der Weel	14 November 1990 (aged 21)	1.61 m	0	0	(United Kingdom) GB Handball
5	CB	Nina Heglund	24 July 1993 (aged 19)	1.70 m	0	0	(United Kingdom) GB Handball
7	CB	Lynn McCafferty	16 April 1979 (aged 33)	1.68 m	0	0	(United Kingdom) GB Handball
8	P	Louise Jukes	14 April 1984 (aged 28)	1.69 m	0	0	(United Kingdom) GB Handball
9	LW	Britt Goodwin	24 April 1983 (aged 29)	1.63 m	0	0	(United Kingdom) GB Handball
10	RW	Kelsi Fairbrother	5 August 1989 (aged 22)	1.63 m	0	0	(Denmark) Team Esbjerg
11	P	Lyn Byl	1 December 1979 (aged 32)	1.72 m	0	0	(United Kingdom) GB Handball
13	RB	Yvonne Leuthold	30 January 1980 (aged 32)	1.76 m	0	0	(United Kingdom) GB Handball
17	LB	Ewa Palies	30 January 1989 (aged 23)	1.73 m	0	0	(United Kingdom) GB Handball
21	LB	Kathryn Fudge	10 November 1989 (aged 22)	1.83 m	0	0	(United Kingdom) GB Handball
66	GK	Jane Mayes	10 January 1989 (aged 23)	1.73 m	0	0	(United Kingdom) GB Handball
86	RB	Marie Gerbron	23 December 1986 (aged 25)	1.66 m	0	0	(United Kingdom) GB Handball

=== Montenegro ===
The following is the Montenegro roster in the women's handball tournament of the 2012 Summer Olympics.

Head coaches: Dragan Adžić

No.	Pos.	Name	Date of birth (age)	Height	App.	Goals	Club
1	GK	Marina Vukčević	24 August 1993 (aged 18)	1.75 m			(Montenegro) ŽRK Budućnost
2	RW	Radmila Miljanić	19 April 1988 (aged 24)	1.57 m			(Montenegro) ŽRK Budućnost
4	RW	Jovanka Radičević	23 October 1986 (aged 25)	1.70 m			(Hungary) Győri Audi
5	P	Ana Đokić	9 February 1979 (aged 33)	1.65 m			(Montenegro) ŽRK Budućnost
8	LB	Marija Jovanović	26 December 1985 (aged 26)	1.82 m			(Romania) Oltchim Vâlcea
9	CB	Ana Radović	21 August 1986 (aged 25)	1.75 m			(Montenegro) ŽRK Budućnost
10	CB	Anđela Bulatović	15 January 1987 (aged 25)	1.75 m			(Montenegro) ŽRK Budućnost
12	GK	Sonja Barjaktarović	11 September 1986 (aged 25)	1.80 m			(Montenegro) ŽRK Budućnost
14	LW	Maja Savić	29 April 1976 (aged 36)	1.76 m			(Montenegro) ŽRK Budućnost
17	LB	Bojana Popović	20 November 1979 (aged 32)	1.85 m			(Montenegro) ŽRK Budućnost
26	P	Suzana Lazović	28 January 1992 (aged 20)	1.76 m			(Montenegro) ŽRK Budućnost
32	RB	Katarina Bulatović	15 November 1984 (aged 27)	1.86 m			(Romania) Oltchim Vâlcea
77	LW	Majda Mehmedović	25 May 1990 (aged 22)	1.71 m			(Montenegro) ŽRK Budućnost
90	CB	Milena Knežević	12 March 1990 (aged 22)	1.77 m			(Montenegro) ŽRK Budućnost

=== Russia ===
The following is the Russia roster in the women's handball tournament of the 2012 Summer Olympics.

Head coaches: Evgeny Trefilov

No.	Pos.	Name	Date of birth (age)	Height	App.	Goals	Club
5	LB	Lyudmila Postnova	11 August 1984 (aged 27)	1.80 m			(Russia) Zvezda Zvenigorod
7	P	Liudmila Bodnieva	15 October 1978 (aged 33)	1.79 m			(Slovenia) RK Krim
10	RB	Ekaterina Davydenko	7 March 1989 (aged 23)	1.82 m			(Russia) Lada Togliatti
11	CB	Olga Levina	4 March 1985 (aged 27)	1.78 m			(Russia) Dinamo Volgograd
12	GK	Anna Sedoykina	1 August 1984 (aged 27)	1.88 m			(Russia) Dinamo Volgograd
15	P	Natalia Shipilova	31 December 1979 (aged 32)	1.81 m			(Russia) Lada Togliatti
16	GK	Maria Sidorova	21 November 1979 (aged 32)	1.78 m			(Russia) Lada Togliatti
18	CB	Nadezhda Muravyeva	30 June 1980 (aged 32)	1.85 m			(Russia) Lada Togliatti
21	LB	Victoria Zhilinskayte	6 March 1989 (aged 23)	1.90 m			(Russia) Lada Togliatti
22	LW	Yekaterina Marennikova	29 April 1982 (aged 30)	1.73 m			(Russia) Lada Togliatti
24	RB	Irina Bliznova	6 October 1986 (aged 25)	1.80 m			(Russia) Lada Togliatti
25	LW	Emiliia Turei	6 October 1984 (aged 27)	1.74 m			(Russia) Rostov-Don
26	CB	Tatiana Khmyrova	6 February 1990 (aged 22)	1.73m			(Russia) Dinamo Volgograd
29	RW	Olga Chernoivanenko	17 April 1989 (aged 23)	1.76 m			(Russia) Lada Togliatti

== Group B ==
=== Denmark ===
The following is the Denmark roster in the women's handball tournament of the 2012 Summer Olympics.

Head coaches: Jan Pytlick

No.	Pos.	Name	Date of birth (age)	Height	App.	Goals	Club
2	P	Mette Melgaard	3 June 1980 (aged 32)	1.70 m			(Denmark) Randers HK
4	P	Susan Thorsgaard	13 October 1988 (aged 23)	1.88 m			(Denmark) FC Midtjylland
9	RB	Camilla Dalby	15 May 1988 (aged 24)	1.82 m			(Denmark) Randers HK
10	CB	Christina Krogshede	4 November 1981 (aged 30)	1.72 m			(Denmark) Frederiksberg IF
12	GK	Karin Mortensen	26 September 1977 (aged 34)	1.81 m			(Denmark) Frederiksberg IF
13	P	Marianne Bonde	25 June 1984 (aged 28)	1.84 m			(Denmark) Frederiksberg IF
15	LB	Pernille Larsen	26 September 1977 (aged 34)	1.84 m			(Denmark) Viborg HK
16	GK	Christina Pedersen	15 December 1982 (aged 29)	1.80 m			(Denmark) Frederiksberg IF
19	RB	Line Jørgensen	31 December 1989 (aged 22)	1.83 m			(Denmark) FC Midtjylland
22	LB	Trine Troelsen	2 May 1985 (aged 27)	1.72 m			(Denmark) FC Midtjylland
23	LW	Ann Grete Nørgaard	15 September 1983 (aged 28)	1.63 m			(Denmark) Team Tvis Holstebro
24	CB	Berit Kristensen	2 August 1983 (aged 28)	1.72 m			(Denmark) Randers HK
25	LB	Rikke Skov	7 September 1980 (aged 31)	1.81 m			(Denmark) Viborg HK
27	RB	Louise Burgaard	17 October 1992 (aged 19)	1.76 m			(Denmark) Team Tvis Holstebro

=== France ===
The following is the France roster in the women's handball tournament of the 2012 Summer Olympics.

Head coaches: Olivier Krumbholz

No.	Pos.	Name	Date of birth (age)	Height	App.	Goals	Club
3	RW	Blandine Dancette	14 February 1988 (aged 24)	1.69 m			(France) HBC Nîmes
4	P	Nina Kamto Njitam	25 June 1983 (aged 29)	1.78 m			(France) Metz Handball
5	RB	Camille Ayglon	21 May 1985 (aged 27)	1.80 m			(France) HBC Nîmes
7	CB	Allison Pineau	2 May 1989 (aged 23)	1.81 m			(Romania) Oltchim Vâlcea
8	LB	Claudine Mendy	8 January 1990 (aged 22)	1.82 m			(France) Metz Handball
9	LW	Paule Baudouin	25 October 1984 (aged 27)	1.72 m			(France) Metz Handball
10	CB	Sophie Herbrecht	13 February 1982 (aged 30)	1.74 m			(France) HBC Nîmes
12	GK	Amandine Leynaud	2 May 1986 (aged 26)	1.78 m			(Romania) Oltchim Vâlcea
16	GK	Cléopâtre Darleux	1 July 1989 (aged 23)	1.76 m			(France) Arvor 29
17	LW	Siraba Dembélé	28 June 1986 (aged 26)	1.72 m			(France) Toulon HB
18	RW	Audrey Deroin	6 September 1989 (aged 22)	1.76 m			(France) Toulon HB
20	LB	Raphaëlle Tervel	21 April 1979 (aged 33)	1.78 m			(Spain) SD Itxako
24	LB	Mariama Signaté	22 July 1985 (aged 27)	1.89 m			(France) Issy Paris HB
64	RB	Alexandra Lacrabère	27 April 1987 (aged 25)	1.77 m			(France) Arvor 29

=== Norway ===
The following is the Norway roster in the women's handball tournament of the 2012 Summer Olympics.

Head coaches: Thorir Hergeirsson

No.	Pos.	Name	Date of birth (age)	Height	App.	Goals	Club
1	GK	Kari Aalvik Grimsbø	4 January 1985 (aged 27)	1.80 m			(Denmark) Team Esbjerg
5	LB	Ida Alstad	13 June 1985 (aged 27)	1.72 m			(Norway) Byåsen HE
6	P	Heidi Løke	12 December 1982 (aged 29)	1.77 m			(Hungary) Győri ETO KC
7	RB	Tonje Nøstvold	7 May 1985 (aged 27)	1.78 m			(Norway) Byåsen HE
8	CB	Karoline Dyhre Breivang	10 May 1980 (aged 32)	1.72 m			(Norway) Larvik HK
9	LB	Kristine Lunde-Borgersen	30 March 1980 (aged 32)	1.83 m			(Norway) IK Våg
11	LW	Kari Mette Johansen	11 January 1979 (aged 33)	1.72 m			(Norway) Larvik HK
13	P	Marit Malm Frafjord	25 November 1985 (aged 26)	1.82 m			(Denmark) Viborg HK
15	RB	Linn Jørum Sulland	15 July 1984 (aged 28)	1.78 m			(Norway) Larvik HK
16	GK	Katrine Lunde Haraldsen	30 March 1980 (aged 32)	1.81 m			(Hungary) Győri ETO KC
18	RW	Linn-Kristin Riegelhuth Koren	1 August 1984 (aged 27)	1.75 m			(Norway) Larvik HK
21	CB	Gøril Snorroeggen	15 February 1985 (aged 27)	1.77 m			(Denmark) Team Esbjerg
22	RW	Amanda Kurtović	25 July 1991 (aged 21)	1.79 m			(Denmark) Viborg HK
23	LW	Camilla Herrem	8 October 1986 (aged 25)	1.66 m			(Norway) Byåsen HE

=== South Korea ===
The following is the South Korea roster in the women's handball tournament of the 2012 Summer Olympics.

Head coaches: Kang Jae-won

No.	Pos.	Name	Date of birth (age)	Height	App.	Goals	Club
1	GK	Ju Hui	4 November 1989 (aged 22)	1.80 m	0	0	(South Korea) Colorful Daegu
2	RW	Woo Sun-hee	1 July 1978 (aged 34)	1.72 m	0	0	(South Korea) Wonderful Samcheok
3	CB	Kim On-a	6 September 1988 (aged 23)	1.69 m	0	0	(South Korea) Incheon Sports Council
5	RW	Jung Yu-ra	6 February 1992 (aged 20)	1.70 m	0	0	(South Korea) Colorful Daegu
7	LB	Gwon Han-na	22 November 1989 (aged 22)	1.72 m	0	0	(South Korea) Seoul City
9	P	Kim Cha-youn	10 February 1981 (aged 31)	1.73 m	0	0	(Japan) Omron handball
10	LB	Lee Mi-gyeong	2 October 1991 (aged 20)	1.65 m	0	0	(South Korea) Seoul City
11	RB	Ryu Eun-hee	24 February 1990 (aged 22)	1.80 m	0	0	(South Korea) Incheon Sports Council
12	GK	Moon Kyeong-ha	29 May 1980 (aged 32)	1.76 m	0	0	(South Korea) GNDC
13	P	Kim Cheong-sim	8 February 1976 (aged 36)	1.78 m	0	0	(South Korea) SK Lubricants
17	LB	Sim Hae-in	31 October 1987 (aged 24)	1.78 m	0	0	(South Korea) Wonderful Samcheok
19	RB	Choi Im-jeong	14 February 1981 (aged 31)	1.82 m	0	0	(South Korea) Colorful Daegu
20	CB	Jung Ji-hae	6 March 1985 (aged 27)	1.68 m	0	0	(South Korea) Wonderful Samcheok
21	LW	Jo Hyo-bi	15 July 1991 (aged 21)	1.65 m	0	0	(South Korea) Incheon Sports Council
33	LW	Lee Eun-bi	23 October 1990 (aged 21)	1.63 m	0	0	(South Korea) BISCO

=== Spain ===
The following is the Spanish roster in the women's handball tournament of the 2012 Summer Olympics.

Head coaches: Jorge Dueñas

No.	Pos.	Name	Date of birth (age)	Height	App.	Goals	Club
2	RW	Marta López	4 February 1990 (aged 22)	1.65 m	0	0	(Spain) BM Alcobendas
3	CB	Andrea Barnó	4 January 1980 (aged 32)	1.75 m	0	0	(Spain) SD Itxako
4	RW	Carmen Martín	29 May 1988 (aged 24)	1.68 m	0	0	(Spain) SD Itxako
6	LB	Nely Carla Alberto	2 July 1983 (aged 29)	1.78 m	0	0	(France) Le Havre AC
7	LB	Beatriz Fernández	19 March 1985 (aged 27)	1.80 m	0	0	(Spain) Bera Bera BM
8	P	Verónica Cuadrado	8 March 1979 (aged 33)	1.84 m	0	0	(Denmark) Randers HK
9	RB	Marta Mangué	23 April 1983 (aged 29)	1.70 m	0	0	(Serbia) RK Zaječar
10	CB	Macarena Aguilar	12 March 1985 (aged 27)	1.70 m	0	0	(Spain) SD Itxako
12	GK	Silvia Navarro	20 March 1979 (aged 33)	1.69 m	0	0	(Spain) SD Itxako
13	RW	Jessica Alonso	20 September 1983 (aged 28)	1.72 m	0	0	(Spain) SD Itxako
17	LW	Elisabeth Pinedo	13 May 1981 (aged 31)	1.75 m	0	0	(Spain) Bera Bera BM
18	P	Begoña Fernández	22 March 1980 (aged 32)	1.80 m	0	0	(Spain) SD Itxako
21	LW	Vanessa Amorós	7 December 1982 (aged 29)	1.67 m	0	0	(Spain) CB Mar Alicante
30	LB	Patricia Elorza	8 April 1984 (aged 28)	1.80 m	0	0	(Spain) Bera Bera BM
39	GK	Mihaela Ciobanu	30 January 1973 (aged 39)	1.75 m	0	0	(Spain) BM Alcobendas

=== Sweden ===
The following is the Swedish roster in the women's handball tournament of the 2012 Summer Olympics.

Head coaches: Per Johansson

No.	Pos.	Name	Date of birth (age)	Height	App.	Goals	Club
2	P	Ulrika Ågren	13 July 1987 (aged 25)	1.77 m	24	32	(Denmark) Esbjerg
3	P	Tina Flognman	29 June 1981 (aged 31)	1.78 m	204	369	(France) Toulon
4	LW	Matilda Boson	4 December 1981 (aged 30)	1.76 m	199	491	(Sweden) Spårvägen
5	P	Hanna Fogelström	8 November 1990 (aged 21)	1.79 m	17	29	(Sweden) Sävehof
6	RB	Therese Islas Helgesson	28 May 1990 (aged 22)	1.69 m	102	202	(France) Toulon
8	LB	Jamina Roberts	28 May 1990 (aged 22)	1.75 m	40	55	(Sweden) Sävehof
10	RW	Annika Wiel Fredén	21 August 1978 (aged 33)	1.76 m	101	305	(Sweden) Heid
12	GK	Gabriella Kain	25 March 1981 (aged 31)	1.79 m	74	0	(Denmark) Kolding
15	LB	Johanna Ahlm	3 October 1987 (aged 24)	1.75 m	79	301	(Denmark) Viborg
16	GK	Cecilia Grubbström	2 September 1986 (aged 25)	1.78 m	60	1	(Sweden) Sävehof
17	CB	Linnea Torstenson	30 March 1983 (aged 29)	1.86 m	117	500	(Denmark) Midtjylland
18	P	Johanna Wiberg	6 September 1983 (aged 28)	1.85 m	136	90	(Sweden) Eslöv
20	CB	Isabelle Gulldén	29 June 1989 (aged 23)	1.78 m	88	245	(Denmark) Viborg
25	CB	Angelica Wallén	11 April 1986 (aged 26)	1.71 m	37	58	(Denmark) Esbjerg
31	LB	Anna-Maria Johansson	15 February 1982 (aged 30)	1.80 m	45	97	(Sweden) Skövde

== See also ==
- Handball at the 2012 Summer Olympics – Men's team rosters
