= 2012 European Women's Handball Championship qualification =

This page describes the qualifying procedure for the 2012 European Women's Handball Championship.

== Qualification system ==
=== Seeding ===
The draw for the qualification round was held on 27 April 2011 at the EHF headquarters, in Vienna. The host country, the Netherlands, was directly qualified. The remaining 30 teams were divided into several pots according to the "EHF Women's National Team Ranking", and were successfully drawn so that each qualification group contained one team from each pot. The four lowest ranked teams, participated in a pre-qualification tournament to decide the last two spots.

=== Playing dates ===
- Pre-qualification: June 2011
- Rounds 1 and 2: 19–23 October 2011
- Rounds 3 and 4: 21–25 March 2012
- Rounds 5 and 6: 30 May – 3 June 2012

== Pre-Qualification ==
Team 1	Agg.	Team 2	1st leg	2nd leg
Israel	52–53	Greece	25–30	27–23
Finland	42–58	Great Britain	22–31	20–27

=== Game 1 ===
3 June 2011; 16:30	Israel	25 – 30	Greece	Municipal hall"Ionikos", Athens; Attendance: 200; Referees: Aghakishi, Aghakishi (AZE)
3 June 2011; 16:30	Vikrat 12	(12–11)	Strataki 8	Municipal hall"Ionikos", Athens; Attendance: 200; Referees: Aghakishi, Aghakishi (AZE)
3 June 2011; 16:30	3× (yellow card) 6× (suspension) 1× (red card)	Report	3× (yellow card) 4× (suspension) 1× (red card)	Municipal hall"Ionikos", Athens; Attendance: 200; Referees: Aghakishi, Aghakishi (AZE)

3 June 2011; 19:30	Finland	22 – 31	Great Britain	Crystal Palace National Sports Centre, London; Attendance: 200; Referees: Baranowski, Lemanowicz (POL)
3 June 2011; 19:30	Jäntti 4	(12–15)	Fudge 6	Crystal Palace National Sports Centre, London; Attendance: 200; Referees: Baranowski, Lemanowicz (POL)
3 June 2011; 19:30	3× (yellow card) 1× (suspension)	Report	2× (yellow card) 5× (suspension)	Crystal Palace National Sports Centre, London; Attendance: 200; Referees: Baranowski, Lemanowicz (POL)

=== Game 2 ===
4 June 2011; 16:00	Greece	23 – 27	Israel	Municipal hall"Ionikos", Athens; Attendance: 300; Referees: Aghakishi, Aghakishi (AZE)
4 June 2011; 16:00	Tsakalou 9	(12–11)	Vikrat 6	Municipal hall"Ionikos", Athens; Attendance: 300; Referees: Aghakishi, Aghakishi (AZE)
4 June 2011; 16:00	3× (yellow card) 3× (suspension)	Report	2× (yellow card) 3× (suspension)	Municipal hall"Ionikos", Athens; Attendance: 300; Referees: Aghakishi, Aghakishi (AZE)

4 June 2011; 19:30	Great Britain	27 – 20	Finland	Crystal Palace National Sports Centre, London; Attendance: 400; Referees: Baranowski, Lemanowicz (POL)
4 June 2011; 19:30	Fairbrother 7	(12–11)	Roos 8	Crystal Palace National Sports Centre, London; Attendance: 400; Referees: Baranowski, Lemanowicz (POL)
4 June 2011; 19:30	3× (yellow card) 4× (suspension)	Report	3× (yellow card) 4× (suspension)	Crystal Palace National Sports Centre, London; Attendance: 400; Referees: Baranowski, Lemanowicz (POL)

== Groups ==
The draw for the qualification round defined the groups shown below. A provisional match schedule was elaborated and distributed to all national federations taking part in this round.

Key:

- Teams highlighted in green qualified for the tournament.

=== Group 1 ===
Pos	Team	Pld	W	D	L	GF	GA	GD	Pts	Qualification	GER	HUN	BLR	AZE
1	Germany	6	5	0	1	178	125	+53	10	Final tournament	—	26–18	27–19	35–21
2	Hungary	6	5	0	1	174	138	+36	10	Final tournament	25–23	—	28–21	41–19
3	Belarus	6	2	0	4	155	162	−7	4		26–33	25–28	—	33–25
4	Azerbaijan	6	0	0	6	126	208	−82	0		16–34	24–34	21–31	—

All times are local.

19 October 2011; 18:00	Hungary	41 – 19	Azerbaijan	Arena Savaria, Szombathely; Attendance: 2,000; Referees: Marić, Mašić (SRB)
19 October 2011; 18:00	Görbicz 6	(20–7)	five players 3	Arena Savaria, Szombathely; Attendance: 2,000; Referees: Marić, Mašić (SRB)
19 October 2011; 18:00	3× (yellow card) 1× (suspension)	Report	3× (yellow card) 2× (suspension)	Arena Savaria, Szombathely; Attendance: 2,000; Referees: Marić, Mašić (SRB)

19 October 2011; 19:30	Germany	27 – 19	Belarus	Brandenburg Halle, Frankfurt; Attendance: 1,550; Referees: Arntsen, Gullaksen (NOR)
19 October 2011; 19:30	Richter 5	(15–10)	Yankouskaya 6	Brandenburg Halle, Frankfurt; Attendance: 1,550; Referees: Arntsen, Gullaksen (NOR)
19 October 2011; 19:30	2× (yellow card)	Report	2× (yellow card) 2× (suspension)	Brandenburg Halle, Frankfurt; Attendance: 1,550; Referees: Arntsen, Gullaksen (NOR)

23 October 2011; 17:00	Azerbaijan	16 – 34	Germany	ABU Arena, Baku; Attendance: 500; Referees: Pavićević, Ražnatović (MNE)
23 October 2011; 17:00	Lukyanenko, Pogonina 4	(7–15)	Richter 8	ABU Arena, Baku; Attendance: 500; Referees: Pavićević, Ražnatović (MNE)
23 October 2011; 17:00	3× (yellow card) 3× (suspension)	Report	3× (yellow card) 2× (suspension)	ABU Arena, Baku; Attendance: 500; Referees: Pavićević, Ražnatović (MNE)

23 October 2011; 17:30	Belarus	25 – 28	Hungary	Sport Complex Olympiets, Mogilev; Attendance: 2,000; Referees: Kouz, Zhoba (UKR)
23 October 2011; 17:30	Lobach, Yankouskaya 6	(14–12)	Görbicz 9	Sport Complex Olympiets, Mogilev; Attendance: 2,000; Referees: Kouz, Zhoba (UKR)
23 October 2011; 17:30	3× (yellow card) 3× (suspension)	Report	3× (yellow card) 2× (suspension)	Sport Complex Olympiets, Mogilev; Attendance: 2,000; Referees: Kouz, Zhoba (UKR)

21 March 2012; 17:00	Azerbaijan	21 – 31	Belarus	ABU Arena, Baku; Attendance: 400; Referees: Crnojevic, Radic (CRO)
21 March 2012; 17:00	Tankaskaya 5	(9–15)	Artsiukhovich 8	ABU Arena, Baku; Attendance: 400; Referees: Crnojevic, Radic (CRO)
21 March 2012; 17:00	2× (yellow card) 2× (suspension)	Report	2× (yellow card) 3× (suspension)	ABU Arena, Baku; Attendance: 400; Referees: Crnojevic, Radic (CRO)

22 March 2012; 18:15	Hungary	25 – 23	Germany	Főnix Hall, Debrecen; Attendance: 3,000; Referees: Zotin, Volodkov (RUS)
22 March 2012; 18:15	Görbicz 7	(14–10)	Nadgornaja 11	Főnix Hall, Debrecen; Attendance: 3,000; Referees: Zotin, Volodkov (RUS)
22 March 2012; 18:15	3× (yellow card) 1× (suspension)	Report	3× (yellow card) 3× (suspension)	Főnix Hall, Debrecen; Attendance: 3,000; Referees: Zotin, Volodkov (RUS)

25 March 2012; 15:00	Germany	26 – 18	Hungary	Trier Arena, Trier; Attendance: 2,015; Referees: Opava, Valek (CZE)
25 March 2012; 15:00	Lütz 8	(13–9)	Kovacsics 6	Trier Arena, Trier; Attendance: 2,015; Referees: Opava, Valek (CZE)
25 March 2012; 15:00	3× (yellow card) 1× (suspension)	Report	3× (yellow card) 2× (suspension)	Trier Arena, Trier; Attendance: 2,015; Referees: Opava, Valek (CZE)

25 March 2012; 15:00	Belarus	33 – 25	Azerbaijan	Sport Complex Olympiets, Mogilev; Attendance: 2,000; Referees: Rutkovskis, Dzerve (LAT)
25 March 2012; 15:00	Kamenshykova 6	(18–13)	three players 5	Sport Complex Olympiets, Mogilev; Attendance: 2,000; Referees: Rutkovskis, Dzerve (LAT)
25 March 2012; 15:00	2× (yellow card) 1× (suspension)	Report	3× (yellow card)	Sport Complex Olympiets, Mogilev; Attendance: 2,000; Referees: Rutkovskis, Dzerve (LAT)

30 May 2012; 17:00	Azerbaijan	24 – 34	Hungary	ABU Arena, Baku; Attendance: 300; Referees: Pandžić, Satordzija (BIH)
30 May 2012; 17:00	three players	(9–14)	Cifra 8	ABU Arena, Baku; Attendance: 300; Referees: Pandžić, Satordzija (BIH)
30 May 2012; 17:00	3× (yellow card) 7× (suspension)	Report	3× (yellow card) 3× (suspension)	ABU Arena, Baku; Attendance: 300; Referees: Pandžić, Satordzija (BIH)

30 May 2012; 19:00	Belarus	26 – 33	Germany	Palace of Sport, Minsk; Attendance: 2,400; Referees: Baranowski, Lemanowicz (POL)
30 May 2012; 19:00	Kamenshykova 6	(12–15)	Nadgornaja 13	Palace of Sport, Minsk; Attendance: 2,400; Referees: Baranowski, Lemanowicz (POL)
30 May 2012; 19:00	3× (yellow card) 4× (suspension)	Report	2× (yellow card) 4× (suspension)	Palace of Sport, Minsk; Attendance: 2,400; Referees: Baranowski, Lemanowicz (POL)

3 June 2012; 12:15	Hungary	28 – 21	Belarus	City Hall Dabas Dabas; Attendance: 1,200; Referees: Lah, Sok (SLO)
3 June 2012; 12:15	Görbicz 8	(14–10)	Artsiukhovich 4	City Hall Dabas Dabas; Attendance: 1,200; Referees: Lah, Sok (SLO)
3 June 2012; 12:15	3× (yellow card) 3× (suspension)	Report	3× (yellow card) 3× (suspension)	City Hall Dabas Dabas; Attendance: 1,200; Referees: Lah, Sok (SLO)

3 June 2012; 16:00	Germany	35 – 21	Azerbaijan	Göbel Hotels Arena, Rotenburg an der Fulda; Attendance: 750; Referees: Cacador, Nicolau (POR)
3 June 2012; 16:00	three players 5	(14–7)	Peche, Tankaskaya 4	Göbel Hotels Arena, Rotenburg an der Fulda; Attendance: 750; Referees: Cacador, Nicolau (POR)
3 June 2012; 16:00	2× (yellow card) 4× (suspension)	Report	1× (yellow card) 6× (suspension)	Göbel Hotels Arena, Rotenburg an der Fulda; Attendance: 750; Referees: Cacador, Nicolau (POR)

=== Group 2 ===
Pos	Team	Pld	W	D	L	GF	GA	GD	Pts	Qualification	ROU	SRB	POR	GRE
1	Romania	6	5	0	1	187	128	+59	10	Final tournament	—	21–19	35–24	31–14
2	Serbia	6	5	0	1	179	131	+48	10	Final tournament	29–27	—	37–21	36–20
3	Portugal	6	2	0	4	151	180	−29	4		24–35	21–32	—	31–23
4	Greece	6	0	0	6	114	192	−78	0		18–38	21–26	18–30	—

All times are local.

19 October 2011; 18:00	Serbia	36 – 20	Greece	Čair Sports Center, Niš; Attendance: 3,500; Referees: Brehmer, Skowronek (POL)
19 October 2011; 18:00	Lekić 10	(19–9)	Logdanidou 7	Čair Sports Center, Niš; Attendance: 3,500; Referees: Brehmer, Skowronek (POL)
19 October 2011; 18:00	3× (yellow card) 2× (suspension)	Report	3× (yellow card) 1× (suspension)	Čair Sports Center, Niš; Attendance: 3,500; Referees: Brehmer, Skowronek (POL)

19 October 2011; 20:00	Romania	35 – 24	Portugal	Sala Sporturilor Traian, Râmnicu Vâlcea; Attendance: 1,800; Referees: Markovska, Vutov (BUL)
19 October 2011; 20:00	Manea 9	(15–12)	Aguiar, Alves 6	Sala Sporturilor Traian, Râmnicu Vâlcea; Attendance: 1,800; Referees: Markovska, Vutov (BUL)
19 October 2011; 20:00	3× (yellow card) 2× (suspension)	Report	3× (yellow card) 3× (suspension)	Sala Sporturilor Traian, Râmnicu Vâlcea; Attendance: 1,800; Referees: Markovska, Vutov (BUL)

22 October 2011; 17:00	Greece	18 – 38	Romania	Mikras 3, Thessaloniki; Attendance: 300; Referees: Crnojević, Radić (CRO)
22 October 2011; 17:00	Strataki, Tsakalou 5	(8–16)	Buceschi, Chintoan 6	Mikras 3, Thessaloniki; Attendance: 300; Referees: Crnojević, Radić (CRO)
22 October 2011; 17:00	2× (yellow card) 5× (suspension)	Report	2× (yellow card)	Mikras 3, Thessaloniki; Attendance: 300; Referees: Crnojević, Radić (CRO)

23 October 2011; 15:00	Portugal	21 – 32	Serbia	Moimenta da Beira; Attendance: 1,200; Referees: Hájek, Macho (CZE)
23 October 2011; 15:00	Lopes 6	(12–15)	Lekić 8	Moimenta da Beira; Attendance: 1,200; Referees: Hájek, Macho (CZE)
23 October 2011; 15:00	3× (yellow card) 4× (suspension)	Report	3× (yellow card) 4× (suspension)	Moimenta da Beira; Attendance: 1,200; Referees: Hájek, Macho (CZE)

21 March 2012; 18:00	Greece	18 – 30	Portugal	Mikras 3, Thessaloniki; Attendance: 400; Referees: Van Dijk, Wijtenburg (NED)
21 March 2012; 18:00	Tsakalou 7	(10–14)	de Sousa 6	Mikras 3, Thessaloniki; Attendance: 400; Referees: Van Dijk, Wijtenburg (NED)
21 March 2012; 18:00	3× (yellow card) 2× (suspension)	Report	3× (yellow card) 4× (suspension)	Mikras 3, Thessaloniki; Attendance: 400; Referees: Van Dijk, Wijtenburg (NED)

22 March 2012; 19:00	Serbia	29 – 27	Romania	SRC Kraljevica, Zaječar; Attendance: 2,200; Referees: Badura, Ondogrecula (SVK)
22 March 2012; 19:00	Lekić 9	(17–11)	Băbeanu 5	SRC Kraljevica, Zaječar; Attendance: 2,200; Referees: Badura, Ondogrecula (SVK)
22 March 2012; 19:00	3× (yellow card) 3× (suspension)	Report	3× (yellow card) 1× (suspension)	SRC Kraljevica, Zaječar; Attendance: 2,200; Referees: Badura, Ondogrecula (SVK)

24 March 2012; 17:00	Portugal	31 – 23	Greece	Moimenta da Beira; Attendance: 500; Referees: Bounouara, Sami (FRA)
24 March 2012; 17:00	three players 7	(15–14)	Tsakalou 7	Moimenta da Beira; Attendance: 500; Referees: Bounouara, Sami (FRA)
24 March 2012; 17:00	3× (yellow card) 2× (suspension)	Report	3× (yellow card) 3× (suspension)	Moimenta da Beira; Attendance: 500; Referees: Bounouara, Sami (FRA)

24 March 2012; 18:00	Romania	21 – 19	Serbia	Polivalent Hall Drobeta, Drobeta-Turnu Severin; Attendance: 1,800; Referees: Mazeika, Gatelis (LTU)
24 March 2012; 18:00	Băbeanu 6	(10–11)	Filipović 7	Polivalent Hall Drobeta, Drobeta-Turnu Severin; Attendance: 1,800; Referees: Mazeika, Gatelis (LTU)
24 March 2012; 18:00	3× (yellow card) 2× (suspension)	Report	3× (yellow card) 5× (suspension)	Polivalent Hall Drobeta, Drobeta-Turnu Severin; Attendance: 1,800; Referees: Mazeika, Gatelis (LTU)

30 May 2012; 18:00	Greece	21 – 26	Serbia	DAK Amintaiou, Amyntaio; Attendance: 1,500; Referees: Aliyev, Aghakishiyev (AZE)
30 May 2012; 18:00	Tsakalou 7	(11–13)	Lekić, Lojpur 6	DAK Amintaiou, Amyntaio; Attendance: 1,500; Referees: Aliyev, Aghakishiyev (AZE)
30 May 2012; 18:00	3× (yellow card) 1× (suspension)	Report	3× (suspension)	DAK Amintaiou, Amyntaio; Attendance: 1,500; Referees: Aliyev, Aghakishiyev (AZE)

30 May 2012; 20:45	Portugal	24 – 35	Romania	Pavilhão Municipal, Moimenta da Beira; Attendance: 1,000; Referees: Kouz, Zhoba (UKR)
30 May 2012; 20:45	Lopes, Soares 4	(13–20)	Ciuciulete 6	Pavilhão Municipal, Moimenta da Beira; Attendance: 1,000; Referees: Kouz, Zhoba (UKR)
30 May 2012; 20:45	3× (yellow card) 4× (suspension)	Report	3× (yellow card) 1× (suspension)	Pavilhão Municipal, Moimenta da Beira; Attendance: 1,000; Referees: Kouz, Zhoba (UKR)

2 June 2012; 17:00	Romania	31 – 14	Greece	Sala Polivalentă, Piatra Neamţ; Attendance: 2,200; Referees: Vitaku, Vitaku (Kosovo)
2 June 2012; 17:00	Farcău 8	(16–10)	Strataki 3	Sala Polivalentă, Piatra Neamţ; Attendance: 2,200; Referees: Vitaku, Vitaku (Kosovo)
2 June 2012; 17:00	3× (yellow card)	Report	3× (yellow card) 2× (suspension)	Sala Polivalentă, Piatra Neamţ; Attendance: 2,200; Referees: Vitaku, Vitaku (Kosovo)

2 June 2012; 18:00	Serbia	37 – 21	Portugal	Sportska hala Slana Bara, Novi Sad; Attendance: 1,300; Referees: Leszczyński, Piechota (POL)
2 June 2012; 18:00	four players 5	(21–9)	Silva Pereira 5	Sportska hala Slana Bara, Novi Sad; Attendance: 1,300; Referees: Leszczyński, Piechota (POL)
2 June 2012; 18:00	3× (yellow card) 4× (suspension)	Report	3× (yellow card) 2× (suspension)	Sportska hala Slana Bara, Novi Sad; Attendance: 1,300; Referees: Leszczyński, Piechota (POL)

=== Group 3 ===
Pos	Team	Pld	W	D	L	GF	GA	GD	Pts	Qualification	MNE	RUS	POL	GBR
1	Montenegro	6	5	0	1	180	136	+44	10	Final tournament	—	23–22	32–23	34–18
2	Russia	6	4	0	2	155	135	+20	8	Final tournament	24–23	—	32–21	31–22
3	Poland	6	3	0	3	163	157	+6	6		27–31	30–22	—	29–20
4	Great Britain	6	0	0	6	118	188	−70	0		22–37	16–24	20–33	—

All times are local.

19 October 2011; 18:00	Montenegro	34 – 18	Great Britain	Herceg Novi; Attendance: 1,000; Referees: Brkic, Jusufhodzic (AUT)
19 October 2011; 18:00	Knežević 5	(21–6)	Fudge 5	Herceg Novi; Attendance: 1,000; Referees: Brkic, Jusufhodzic (AUT)
19 October 2011; 18:00	3× (yellow card) 7× (suspension)	Report	3× (yellow card) 2× (suspension)	Herceg Novi; Attendance: 1,000; Referees: Brkic, Jusufhodzic (AUT)

19 October 2011; 19:00	Russia	32 – 21	Poland	Sportkomplex USK Olimp, Tolyatti; Attendance: 2,700; Referees: Mayeuski, Tereshchenkov (BLR)
19 October 2011; 19:00	Kuznetcova 7	(19–9)	Byzdra 10	Sportkomplex USK Olimp, Tolyatti; Attendance: 2,700; Referees: Mayeuski, Tereshchenkov (BLR)
19 October 2011; 19:00	3× (yellow card) 3× (suspension)	Report	3× (yellow card) 4× (suspension)	Sportkomplex USK Olimp, Tolyatti; Attendance: 2,700; Referees: Mayeuski, Tereshchenkov (BLR)

22 October 2011; 14:45	Poland	27 – 31	Montenegro	MOSiR, Chorzów; Attendance: 1,000; Referees: Gjeding, Hansen (DEN)
22 October 2011; 14:45	Niedźwiedź 8	(15–18)	Savić 8	MOSiR, Chorzów; Attendance: 1,000; Referees: Gjeding, Hansen (DEN)
22 October 2011; 14:45	3× (yellow card) 3× (suspension)	Report	2× (yellow card) 7× (suspension)	MOSiR, Chorzów; Attendance: 1,000; Referees: Gjeding, Hansen (DEN)

22 October 2011; 15:00	Great Britain	16 – 24	Russia	Crystal Palace National Sports Centre, London; Attendance: 500; Referees: Samuelsen, Hansen (FRO)
22 October 2011; 15:00	McCafferty 3	(10–14)	Gorshenina 4	Crystal Palace National Sports Centre, London; Attendance: 500; Referees: Samuelsen, Hansen (FRO)
22 October 2011; 15:00	2× (yellow card) 4× (suspension)	Report	2× (yellow card) 2× (suspension) 1× (red card)	Crystal Palace National Sports Centre, London; Attendance: 500; Referees: Samuelsen, Hansen (FRO)

21 March 2012; 18:30	Montenegro	23 – 22	Russia	Morača Sports Center, Podgorica; Attendance: 3,500; Referees: Brunovsky, Canda (SVK)
21 March 2012; 18:30	Đokić, Popović 6	(10–9)	Chernoivanenko 4	Morača Sports Center, Podgorica; Attendance: 3,500; Referees: Brunovsky, Canda (SVK)
21 March 2012; 18:30	3× (yellow card)	Report	3× (yellow card) 1× (suspension)	Morača Sports Center, Podgorica; Attendance: 3,500; Referees: Brunovsky, Canda (SVK)

22 March 2012; 14:00	Great Britain	20 – 33	Poland	Sir David Wallace Sports Hall, Loughborough; Attendance: 800; Referees: Schulze, Tönnies (GER)
22 March 2012; 14:00	Fudge, Van der Weel 4	(8–10)	Polenz 7	Sir David Wallace Sports Hall, Loughborough; Attendance: 800; Referees: Schulze, Tönnies (GER)
22 March 2012; 14:00	3× (yellow card) 4× (suspension)	Report	2× (yellow card) 4× (suspension)	Sir David Wallace Sports Hall, Loughborough; Attendance: 800; Referees: Schulze, Tönnies (GER)

25 March 2012; 17:00	Russia	24 – 23	Montenegro	Palace of Sport Sport-Don, Rostov-Don; Attendance: 2,400; Referees: Stark, Stefan (ROU)
25 March 2012; 17:00	Levina 5	(12–12)	Radičević 9	Palace of Sport Sport-Don, Rostov-Don; Attendance: 2,400; Referees: Stark, Stefan (ROU)
25 March 2012; 17:00	3× (yellow card) 3× (suspension)	Report	3× (yellow card) 3× (suspension)	Palace of Sport Sport-Don, Rostov-Don; Attendance: 2,400; Referees: Stark, Stefan (ROU)

25 March 2012; 17:30	Poland	29 – 20	Great Britain	Miejska Hala Sportowa, Elbląg; Attendance: 2,500; Referees: Chaskis, Tsakonas (GRE)
25 March 2012; 17:30	Kocela 6	(16–8)	Byl, McCafferty 4	Miejska Hala Sportowa, Elbląg; Attendance: 2,500; Referees: Chaskis, Tsakonas (GRE)
25 March 2012; 17:30	3× (yellow card) 3× (suspension)	Report	3× (yellow card) 5× (suspension)	Miejska Hala Sportowa, Elbląg; Attendance: 2,500; Referees: Chaskis, Tsakonas (GRE)

30 May 2012; 18:00	Poland	30 – 22	Russia	Sport Complex Kwidzyn, Kwidzyn; Attendance: 1,300; Referees: Opava, Valek (CZE)
30 May 2012; 18:00	Kudłacz, Wojtas 6	(15–14)	Davydenko 5	Sport Complex Kwidzyn, Kwidzyn; Attendance: 1,300; Referees: Opava, Valek (CZE)
30 May 2012; 18:00	3× (yellow card) 4× (suspension)	Report	3× (yellow card) 1× (suspension)	Sport Complex Kwidzyn, Kwidzyn; Attendance: 1,300; Referees: Opava, Valek (CZE)

30 May 2012; 19:00	Great Britain	22 – 37	Montenegro	Crystal Palace National Sports Centre, London; Attendance: 500; Referees: Crnojevic, Radic (CRO)
30 May 2012; 19:00	Byl 5	(12–14)	Bulatović 9	Crystal Palace National Sports Centre, London; Attendance: 500; Referees: Crnojevic, Radic (CRO)
30 May 2012; 19:00	3× (yellow card) 3× (suspension)	Report	2× (yellow card) 2× (suspension)	Crystal Palace National Sports Centre, London; Attendance: 500; Referees: Crnojevic, Radic (CRO)

3 June 2012; 18:00	Russia	31 – 22	Great Britain	Sport Palace Volgograd, Tolyatti; Attendance: 3,000; Referees: Novikov, Perepilitsy (UKR)
3 June 2012; 18:00	Shipilova 6	(16–11)	Gerbron 6	Sport Palace Volgograd, Tolyatti; Attendance: 3,000; Referees: Novikov, Perepilitsy (UKR)
3 June 2012; 18:00	3× (yellow card) 2× (suspension)	Report	3× (yellow card) 5× (suspension)	Sport Palace Volgograd, Tolyatti; Attendance: 3,000; Referees: Novikov, Perepilitsy (UKR)

3 June 2012; 20:30	Montenegro	32 – 23	Poland	Morača Sports Center, Podgorica; Attendance: 3,000; Referees: Erdogan, Özdeniz (TUR)
3 June 2012; 20:30	Popović 9	(15–13)	Stasiak 6	Morača Sports Center, Podgorica; Attendance: 3,000; Referees: Erdogan, Özdeniz (TUR)
3 June 2012; 20:30	3× (yellow card) 1× (suspension)	Report	3× (yellow card)	Morača Sports Center, Podgorica; Attendance: 3,000; Referees: Erdogan, Özdeniz (TUR)

=== Group 4 ===
Pos	Team	Pld	W	D	L	GF	GA	GD	Pts	Qualification	FRA	MKD	TUR	LTU
1	France	6	5	0	1	215	149	+66	10	Final tournament	—	40–20	34–25	38–26
2	Macedonia	6	4	0	2	170	176	−6	8	Final tournament	30–27	—	26–24	34–25
3	Turkey	6	2	0	4	175	190	−15	4		23–36	36–28	—	36–31
4	Lithuania	6	1	0	5	166	211	−45	2		25–40	24–32	35–31	—

All times are local.

19 October 2011; 19:30	France	34 – 25	Turkey	Arènes de Metz, Metz; Attendance: 4,000; Referees: Lorente, Serradilla (ESP)
19 October 2011; 19:30	Lacrabère 7	(19–16)	Özel 7	Arènes de Metz, Metz; Attendance: 4,000; Referees: Lorente, Serradilla (ESP)
19 October 2011; 19:30	3× (yellow card) 3× (suspension)	Report	3× (yellow card) 8× (suspension) 1× (red card)	Arènes de Metz, Metz; Attendance: 4,000; Referees: Lorente, Serradilla (ESP)

19 October 2011; 20:00	Macedonia	34 – 25	Lithuania	SRC Kale, Skopje; Attendance: 1,000; Referees: Pavel, State (ROU)
19 October 2011; 20:00	Bajramoska 9	(17–12)	Bernatavičiūtė 10	SRC Kale, Skopje; Attendance: 1,000; Referees: Pavel, State (ROU)
19 October 2011; 20:00	2× (yellow card) 5× (suspension)	Report	3× (yellow card) 5× (suspension)	SRC Kale, Skopje; Attendance: 1,000; Referees: Pavel, State (ROU)

23 October 2011; 17:00	Turkey	36 – 28	Macedonia	Süleyman Evcilmen Spor ve Sergi Salonu, Antalya; Attendance: 1,200; Referees: Herczeg, Südi (HUN)
23 October 2011; 17:00	İskenderoğlu 13	(20–13)	Bajramoska 11	Süleyman Evcilmen Spor ve Sergi Salonu, Antalya; Attendance: 1,200; Referees: Herczeg, Südi (HUN)
23 October 2011; 17:00	3× (yellow card) 9× (suspension)	Report	2× (yellow card) 8× (suspension)	Süleyman Evcilmen Spor ve Sergi Salonu, Antalya; Attendance: 1,200; Referees: Herczeg, Südi (HUN)

23 October 2011; 19:00	Lithuania	25 – 40	France	Alytus Arena, Alytus; Attendance: 1,000; Referees: Yudchyts, Kot (BLR)
23 October 2011; 19:00	Jurgutytė, Vyšniauskaitė 6	(13–21)	Dancette, Signaté 7	Alytus Arena, Alytus; Attendance: 1,000; Referees: Yudchyts, Kot (BLR)
23 October 2011; 19:00	3× (yellow card) 4× (suspension)	Report	3× (yellow card) 6× (suspension)	Alytus Arena, Alytus; Attendance: 1,000; Referees: Yudchyts, Kot (BLR)

21 March 2012; 19:00	Lithuania	35 – 31	Turkey	Cido Arena, Panevėžys; Attendance: 700; Referees: Brkic, Jusufhodzic (AUT)
21 March 2012; 19:00	Darylyte, Vyšniauskaitė 8	(15–12)	İskenderoğlu 9	Cido Arena, Panevėžys; Attendance: 700; Referees: Brkic, Jusufhodzic (AUT)
21 March 2012; 19:00	3× (yellow card) 3× (suspension)	Report	3× (yellow card) 2× (suspension) 1× (red card)	Cido Arena, Panevėžys; Attendance: 700; Referees: Brkic, Jusufhodzic (AUT)

22 March 2012; 20:15	Macedonia	30 – 27	France	SRC Kale, Skopje; Attendance: 1,600; Referees: Bonifert, Oláh (HUN)
22 March 2012; 20:15	Portjanko 9	(18–14)	Ayglon 8	SRC Kale, Skopje; Attendance: 1,600; Referees: Bonifert, Oláh (HUN)
22 March 2012; 20:15	2× (yellow card) 4× (suspension)	Report	3× (yellow card) 4× (suspension)	SRC Kale, Skopje; Attendance: 1,600; Referees: Bonifert, Oláh (HUN)

25 March 2012; 15:00	Turkey	36 – 31	Lithuania	Süleyman Evcilmen Spor ve Sergi Salonu, Antalya; Attendance: 400; Referees: Rakytina, Tkachuk (UKR)
25 March 2012; 15:00	İskenderoğlu, Yılmaz 10	(17–15)	Bernatavičiūtė 11	Süleyman Evcilmen Spor ve Sergi Salonu, Antalya; Attendance: 400; Referees: Rakytina, Tkachuk (UKR)
25 March 2012; 15:00	3× (yellow card) 4× (suspension)	Report	2× (yellow card) 5× (suspension) 1× (red card)	Süleyman Evcilmen Spor ve Sergi Salonu, Antalya; Attendance: 400; Referees: Rakytina, Tkachuk (UKR)

25 March 2012; 15:15	France	40 – 20	Macedonia	Clermont-Ferrand Sports Hall, Clermont-Ferrand; Attendance: 4,300; Referees: Gousko, Repkin (BLR)
25 March 2012; 15:15	Dembélé, Signaté 6	(19–12)	Portjanko 8	Clermont-Ferrand Sports Hall, Clermont-Ferrand; Attendance: 4,300; Referees: Gousko, Repkin (BLR)
25 March 2012; 15:15	3× (yellow card) 2× (suspension)	Report	3× (yellow card) 4× (suspension)	Clermont-Ferrand Sports Hall, Clermont-Ferrand; Attendance: 4,300; Referees: Gousko, Repkin (BLR)

30 May 2012; 19:00	Turkey	23 – 36	France	Süleyman Evcilmen Spor ve Sergi Salonu, Antalya; Attendance: 200; Referees: Schaller, Wutzler (GER)
30 May 2012; 19:00	İskenderoğlu 6	(13–14)	Baudouin 9	Süleyman Evcilmen Spor ve Sergi Salonu, Antalya; Attendance: 200; Referees: Schaller, Wutzler (GER)
30 May 2012; 19:00	2× (yellow card) 5× (suspension)	Report	2× (yellow card) 5× (suspension)	Süleyman Evcilmen Spor ve Sergi Salonu, Antalya; Attendance: 200; Referees: Schaller, Wutzler (GER)

30 May 2012; 19:00	Lithuania	24 – 32	Macedonia	Cido Arena, Panevėžys; Attendance: 500; Referees: Johansson, Kliko (SWE)
30 May 2012; 19:00	Bernatavičiūtė 12	(14–14)	Gjorgjievska 7	Cido Arena, Panevėžys; Attendance: 500; Referees: Johansson, Kliko (SWE)
30 May 2012; 19:00	3× (yellow card) 3× (suspension) 1× (red card)	Report	3× (yellow card) 4× (suspension)	Cido Arena, Panevėžys; Attendance: 500; Referees: Johansson, Kliko (SWE)

3 June 2012; 16:00	France	38 – 26	Lithuania	Palais des Sports de Beaulieu, Nantes; Attendance: 4,850; Referees: Katsikis, Michailidis (GRE)
3 June 2012; 16:00	Baudouin 9	(19–14)	Bernatavičiūtė 9	Palais des Sports de Beaulieu, Nantes; Attendance: 4,850; Referees: Katsikis, Michailidis (GRE)
3 June 2012; 16:00	2× (yellow card) 1× (suspension)	Report	2× (yellow card) 3× (suspension)	Palais des Sports de Beaulieu, Nantes; Attendance: 4,850; Referees: Katsikis, Michailidis (GRE)

3 June 2012; 20:15	Macedonia	26 – 24	Turkey	SRC Kale, Skopje; Attendance: 1,700; Referees: Cohen, Peretz (ISR)
3 June 2012; 20:15	Nikolić 10	(13–12)	three players 6	SRC Kale, Skopje; Attendance: 1,700; Referees: Cohen, Peretz (ISR)
3 June 2012; 20:15	3× (yellow card) 3× (suspension)	Report	3× (yellow card) 6× (suspension)	SRC Kale, Skopje; Attendance: 1,700; Referees: Cohen, Peretz (ISR)

=== Group 5 ===
Pos	Team	Pld	W	D	L	GF	GA	GD	Pts	Qualification	SWE	CZE	AUT	SVN
1	Sweden	6	5	1	0	182	131	+51	11	Final tournament	—	34–24	39–17	27–20
2	Czech Republic	6	4	0	2	169	152	+17	8	Final tournament	21–30	—	28–22	31–19
3	Austria	6	1	1	4	148	184	−36	3		26–26	26–36	—	29–26
4	Slovenia	6	1	0	5	138	170	−32	2		23–26	21–29	29–28	—

All times are local.

19 October 2011; 20:20	Austria	26 – 36	Czech Republic	BSFZ Südstadt, Maria Enzersdorf; Attendance: 800; Referees: Rakytina, Tkachuk (UKR)
19 October 2011; 20:20	Frey 7	(13–16)	Černá 9	BSFZ Südstadt, Maria Enzersdorf; Attendance: 800; Referees: Rakytina, Tkachuk (UKR)
19 October 2011; 20:20	3× (yellow card) 4× (suspension)	Report	3× (yellow card) 4× (suspension)	BSFZ Südstadt, Maria Enzersdorf; Attendance: 800; Referees: Rakytina, Tkachuk (UKR)

20 October 2011; 19:15	Sweden	27 – 20	Slovenia	Arena Skövde, Skövde; Attendance: 1,900; Referees: Guseva, Vartanyan (RUS)
20 October 2011; 19:15	Ahlm 5	(15–10)	Gros 4	Arena Skövde, Skövde; Attendance: 1,900; Referees: Guseva, Vartanyan (RUS)
20 October 2011; 19:15	2× (yellow card)	Report	2× (yellow card) 2× (suspension)	Arena Skövde, Skövde; Attendance: 1,900; Referees: Guseva, Vartanyan (RUS)

22 October 2011; 16:00	Czech Republic	21 – 30	Sweden	Sportovní hala, Most; Attendance: 1,000; Referees: Schaller, Wutzler (GER)
22 October 2011; 16:00	Černá 5	(12–16)	Islas Helgesson 5	Sportovní hala, Most; Attendance: 1,000; Referees: Schaller, Wutzler (GER)
22 October 2011; 16:00	2× (yellow card) 1× (suspension)	Report	2× (yellow card) 2× (suspension)	Sportovní hala, Most; Attendance: 1,000; Referees: Schaller, Wutzler (GER)

23 October 2011; 17:00	Slovenia	29 – 28	Austria	Kodeljevo, Ljubljana; Attendance: 900; Referees: Lythje, Christiansen (DEN)
23 October 2011; 17:00	Gros 13	(13–13)	Frey 8	Kodeljevo, Ljubljana; Attendance: 900; Referees: Lythje, Christiansen (DEN)
23 October 2011; 17:00	3× (yellow card) 3× (suspension)	Report	2× (yellow card) 5× (suspension)	Kodeljevo, Ljubljana; Attendance: 900; Referees: Lythje, Christiansen (DEN)

21 March 2012; 18:00	Czech Republic	31 – 19	Slovenia	Sportovni hala Banik Most, Most; Attendance: 1,100; Referees: Liachovicius, Gecevicius (LTU)
21 March 2012; 18:00	four players 6	(16–11)	Cerenjak 5	Sportovni hala Banik Most, Most; Attendance: 1,100; Referees: Liachovicius, Gecevicius (LTU)
21 March 2012; 18:00	3× (yellow card) 3× (suspension)	Report	3× (yellow card) 3× (suspension)	Sportovni hala Banik Most, Most; Attendance: 1,100; Referees: Liachovicius, Gecevicius (LTU)

22 March 2012; 20:25	Austria	26 – 26	Sweden	Sport Halle Krems, Krems an der Donau; Attendance: 700; Referees: Pavicevic, Raznatovic (MNE)
22 March 2012; 20:25	Aćimović 8	(14–13)	Torstenson 9	Sport Halle Krems, Krems an der Donau; Attendance: 700; Referees: Pavicevic, Raznatovic (MNE)
22 March 2012; 20:25	3× (yellow card) 3× (suspension)	Report	2× (yellow card) 1× (suspension)	Sport Halle Krems, Krems an der Donau; Attendance: 700; Referees: Pavicevic, Raznatovic (MNE)

24 March 2012; 14:00	Sweden	39 – 17	Austria	Norrköping; Attendance: 3,400; Referees: Maric, Masic (SRB)
24 March 2012; 14:00	Ahlm 7	(16–10)	Aćimović 5	Norrköping; Attendance: 3,400; Referees: Maric, Masic (SRB)
24 March 2012; 14:00	3× (yellow card) 1× (suspension)	Report	3× (yellow card) 2× (suspension)	Norrköping; Attendance: 3,400; Referees: Maric, Masic (SRB)

25 March 2012; 19:00	Slovenia	21 – 29	Czech Republic	Arena Stožice, Ljubljana; Attendance: 800; Referees: Harabagiu, Stanescu (ROU)
25 March 2012; 19:00	Gros 9	(10–15)	Tomečková 8	Arena Stožice, Ljubljana; Attendance: 800; Referees: Harabagiu, Stanescu (ROU)
25 March 2012; 19:00	3× (yellow card) 4× (suspension)	Report	2× (yellow card) 3× (suspension)	Arena Stožice, Ljubljana; Attendance: 800; Referees: Harabagiu, Stanescu (ROU)

30 May 2012; 18:00	Czech Republic	28 – 22	Austria	Sportovní hala Euronics, Zlín; Attendance: 1,500; Referees: Rutkovskis, Dzerve (LAT)
30 May 2012; 18:00	Chrenkova 6	(16–11)	Frey 6	Sportovní hala Euronics, Zlín; Attendance: 1,500; Referees: Rutkovskis, Dzerve (LAT)
30 May 2012; 18:00	2× (yellow card) 2× (suspension)	Report	2× (yellow card) 1× (suspension)	Sportovní hala Euronics, Zlín; Attendance: 1,500; Referees: Rutkovskis, Dzerve (LAT)

31 May 2012; 18:00	Slovenia	23 – 26	Sweden	Red Hall, Velenje; Attendance: 600; Referees: Bernet, Wick (SUI)
31 May 2012; 18:00	Gros 8	(10–15)	Bosen, Torstenson 6	Red Hall, Velenje; Attendance: 600; Referees: Bernet, Wick (SUI)
31 May 2012; 18:00	3× (yellow card) 1× (suspension)	Report	3× (yellow card) 3× (suspension)	Red Hall, Velenje; Attendance: 600; Referees: Bernet, Wick (SUI)

2 June 2012; 15:30	Austria	29 – 26	Slovenia	BSFZ Südstadt, Maria Enzersdorf; Attendance: 300; Referees: Argyridis, Mouttas (CYP)
2 June 2012; 15:30	Magelinskas 11	(15–11)	Gubernic, Mavsar 5	BSFZ Südstadt, Maria Enzersdorf; Attendance: 300; Referees: Argyridis, Mouttas (CYP)
2 June 2012; 15:30	3× (yellow card) 1× (suspension)	Report	3× (yellow card) 2× (suspension)	BSFZ Südstadt, Maria Enzersdorf; Attendance: 300; Referees: Argyridis, Mouttas (CYP)

2 June 2012; 18:15	Sweden	34 – 24	Czech Republic	Kristianstad Arena, Kristianstad; Attendance: 2,000; Referees: Florescu, Duta (ROU)
2 June 2012; 18:15	Torstensson 6	(14–13)	Černá 7	Kristianstad Arena, Kristianstad; Attendance: 2,000; Referees: Florescu, Duta (ROU)
2 June 2012; 18:15	1× (suspension)	Report	3× (suspension)	Kristianstad Arena, Kristianstad; Attendance: 2,000; Referees: Florescu, Duta (ROU)

=== Group 6 ===
Pos	Team	Pld	W	D	L	GF	GA	GD	Pts	Qualification	CRO	DEN	SVK	ITA
1	Croatia	6	6	0	0	186	116	+70	12	Final tournament	—	21–19	26–20	40–15
2	Denmark	6	4	0	2	171	137	+34	8	Final tournament	27–31	—	36–24	38–21
3	Slovakia	6	2	0	4	133	154	−21	4		23–34	18–24	—	23–15
4	Italy	6	0	0	6	104	187	−83	0		12–34	22–27	19–25	—

All times are local.

19 October 2011; 18:00	Croatia	40 – 15	Italy	Novigrad; Attendance: 1,000; Referees: Bernet, Wick (SUI)
19 October 2011; 18:00	Šerić 6	(21–7)	Federspieler 4	Novigrad; Attendance: 1,000; Referees: Bernet, Wick (SUI)
19 October 2011; 18:00	3× (yellow card) 3× (suspension)	Report	3× (yellow card) 2× (suspension)	Novigrad; Attendance: 1,000; Referees: Bernet, Wick (SUI)

19 October 2011; 21:30	Denmark	36 – 24	Slovakia	Gråkjær Arena, Holstebro; Attendance: 2,500; Referees: Martins, Martins (POR)
19 October 2011; 21:30	Nørgaard 9	(15–14)	Tóthová 9	Gråkjær Arena, Holstebro; Attendance: 2,500; Referees: Martins, Martins (POR)
19 October 2011; 21:30	3× (yellow card) 5× (suspension)	Report	3× (yellow card) 5× (suspension)	Gråkjær Arena, Holstebro; Attendance: 2,500; Referees: Martins, Martins (POR)

22 October 2011; 18:00	Slovakia	23 – 34	Croatia	Chemkostav Arena, Michalovce; Attendance: 2,000; Referees: Pech, Vagvölgyi (HUN)
22 October 2011; 18:00	Pilekova, Tóthová 4	(10–18)	Penezić, Zebić 7	Chemkostav Arena, Michalovce; Attendance: 2,000; Referees: Pech, Vagvölgyi (HUN)
22 October 2011; 18:00	2× (yellow card) 5× (suspension) 1× (red card)	Report	3× (yellow card) 3× (suspension)	Chemkostav Arena, Michalovce; Attendance: 2,000; Referees: Pech, Vagvölgyi (HUN)

23 October 2011; 18:00	Italy	22 – 27	Denmark	Mestrino; Attendance: 600; Referees: Erdoğan, Özdeniz (TUR)
23 October 2011; 18:00	Federspieler, Onnis 4	(10–14)	Jørgensen 6	Mestrino; Attendance: 600; Referees: Erdoğan, Özdeniz (TUR)
23 October 2011; 18:00	3× (yellow card) 1× (suspension)	Report	3× (yellow card) 3× (suspension)	Mestrino; Attendance: 600; Referees: Erdoğan, Özdeniz (TUR)

21 March 2012; 18:00	Croatia	21 – 19	Denmark	Centar Zamet, Rijeka; Attendance: 2,800; Referees: Lorente, Serradilla (ESP)
21 March 2012; 18:00	Penezić 5	(13–10)	Jörgensen, Nørgaard 4	Centar Zamet, Rijeka; Attendance: 2,800; Referees: Lorente, Serradilla (ESP)
21 March 2012; 18:00	2× (yellow card) 5× (suspension) 1× (red card)	Report	3× (yellow card) 5× (suspension)	Centar Zamet, Rijeka; Attendance: 2,800; Referees: Lorente, Serradilla (ESP)

21 March 2012; 18:00	Italy	19 – 25	Slovakia	Palapalumbo, Salerno; Attendance: 600; Referees: Florescu, Duta (ROU)
21 March 2012; 18:00	Fanton, Onnis 4	(9–12)	Tóthová 10	Palapalumbo, Salerno; Attendance: 600; Referees: Florescu, Duta (ROU)
21 March 2012; 18:00	2× (yellow card) 4× (suspension)	Report	3× (yellow card) 2× (suspension)	Palapalumbo, Salerno; Attendance: 600; Referees: Florescu, Duta (ROU)

24 March 2012; 17:00	Denmark	27 – 31	Croatia	Elro Arena Randers, Randers; Attendance: 2,200; Referees: Baranowski, Lemanowicz (POL)
24 March 2012; 17:00	Nørgaard 8	(12–20)	Penezić, Tatari 7	Elro Arena Randers, Randers; Attendance: 2,200; Referees: Baranowski, Lemanowicz (POL)
24 March 2012; 17:00	3× (yellow card) 5× (suspension)	Report	3× (yellow card) 8× (suspension)	Elro Arena Randers, Randers; Attendance: 2,200; Referees: Baranowski, Lemanowicz (POL)

25 March 2012; 18:00	Slovakia	23 – 15	Italy	City sport hall, Hlohovec; Attendance: 500; Referees: Kouz, Zhoba (UKR)
25 March 2012; 18:00	Dubajová 8	(13–8)	Ganga 4	City sport hall, Hlohovec; Attendance: 500; Referees: Kouz, Zhoba (UKR)
25 March 2012; 18:00	3× (yellow card) 8× (suspension)	Report	2× (yellow card) 6× (suspension)	City sport hall, Hlohovec; Attendance: 500; Referees: Kouz, Zhoba (UKR)

30 May 2012; 18:00	Slovakia	18 – 24	Denmark	Športová Hala, Považská Bystrica; Attendance: 1,100; Referees: Leandersson, Lindroos (FIN)
30 May 2012; 18:00	Jakubisová 5	(5–12)	Burgaard 5	Športová Hala, Považská Bystrica; Attendance: 1,100; Referees: Leandersson, Lindroos (FIN)
30 May 2012; 18:00	3× (yellow card) 4× (suspension)	Report	3× (yellow card) 3× (suspension)	Športová Hala, Považská Bystrica; Attendance: 1,100; Referees: Leandersson, Lindroos (FIN)

30 May 2012; 18:00	Italy	12 – 34	Croatia	Palazzetto dello sport Oderzo, Oderzo; Attendance: 900; Referees: Vujacic, Kazanegra (MNE)
30 May 2012; 18:00	Ganga, Niederwieser 3	(7–19)	Jovetić 9	Palazzetto dello sport Oderzo, Oderzo; Attendance: 900; Referees: Vujacic, Kazanegra (MNE)
30 May 2012; 18:00	3× (yellow card) 1× (suspension)	Report	3× (yellow card) 2× (suspension)	Palazzetto dello sport Oderzo, Oderzo; Attendance: 900; Referees: Vujacic, Kazanegra (MNE)

2 June 2012; 15:00	Denmark	38 – 21	Italy	Roskilde Hallerne, Roskilde; Attendance: 1,800; Referees: Stokes, Bartlett (SCO)
2 June 2012; 15:00	Augustesen 9	(18–8)	Fanton 5	Roskilde Hallerne, Roskilde; Attendance: 1,800; Referees: Stokes, Bartlett (SCO)
2 June 2012; 15:00	3× (yellow card) 4× (suspension)	Report	3× (yellow card) 2× (suspension)	Roskilde Hallerne, Roskilde; Attendance: 1,800; Referees: Stokes, Bartlett (SCO)

3 June 2012; 17:30	Croatia	26 – 20	Slovakia	Novigrad; Attendance: 1,000; Referees: Kurtagic, Wetterwik (SWE)
3 June 2012; 17:30	Penezić 6	(18–12)	Jakubisová 5	Novigrad; Attendance: 1,000; Referees: Kurtagic, Wetterwik (SWE)
3 June 2012; 17:30	3× (yellow card) 4× (suspension)	Report	3× (yellow card) 5× (suspension)	Novigrad; Attendance: 1,000; Referees: Kurtagic, Wetterwik (SWE)

=== Group 7 ===
Pos	Team	Pld	W	D	L	GF	GA	GD	Pts	Qualification	UKR	ESP	ISL	SUI
1	Ukraine	6	5	0	1	151	135	+16	10	Final tournament	—	22–23	22–20	31–20
2	Spain	6	4	0	2	153	132	+21	8	Final tournament	27–28	—	27–22	29–19
3	Iceland	6	3	0	3	140	123	+17	6	Final tournament	20–21	21–18	—	31–16
4	Switzerland	6	0	0	6	119	173	−54	0		25–27	20–29	19–26	—

All times are local.

19 October 2011; 18:00	Ukraine	31 – 20	Switzerland	Palace of Sports, Zaporozhye; Attendance: 600; Referees: Kijauskaite, Zaliene (LTU)
19 October 2011; 18:00	Managarova 7	(16–10)	Dinkel 6	Palace of Sports, Zaporozhye; Attendance: 600; Referees: Kijauskaite, Zaliene (LTU)
19 October 2011; 18:00	3× (yellow card) 6× (suspension)	Report	3× (yellow card) 2× (suspension)	Palace of Sports, Zaporozhye; Attendance: 600; Referees: Kijauskaite, Zaliene (LTU)

20 October 2011; 18:00	Spain	27 – 22	Iceland	Pabellón Europa, Leganés; Attendance: 1,200; Referees: Buy, Pichon (FRA)
20 October 2011; 18:00	Aguilar, Pena 6	(13–9)	Haraldsdóttir, Stefánsdóttir 5	Pabellón Europa, Leganés; Attendance: 1,200; Referees: Buy, Pichon (FRA)
20 October 2011; 18:00	3× (yellow card) 1× (suspension)	Report	3× (yellow card) 5× (suspension)	Pabellón Europa, Leganés; Attendance: 1,200; Referees: Buy, Pichon (FRA)

23 October 2011; 16:00	Iceland	20 – 21	Ukraine	Laugardalshöll, Reykjavík; Attendance: 1,200; Referees: Bonaventura, Bonaventura (FRA)
23 October 2011; 16:00	Bragadóttir, Knútsdóttir 4	(11–8)	Borshchenko 9	Laugardalshöll, Reykjavík; Attendance: 1,200; Referees: Bonaventura, Bonaventura (FRA)
23 October 2011; 16:00	2× (yellow card) 4× (suspension)	Report	2× (yellow card) 6× (suspension) 1× (red card)	Laugardalshöll, Reykjavík; Attendance: 1,200; Referees: Bonaventura, Bonaventura (FRA)

23 October 2011; 17:00	Switzerland	20 – 29	Spain	Geneva; Attendance: 750; Referees: Antić, Jakovljević (SRB)
23 October 2011; 17:00	Mustafoska, Weigelt 5	(6–15)	Alonso, Cuadrado 5	Geneva; Attendance: 750; Referees: Antić, Jakovljević (SRB)
23 October 2011; 17:00	3× (yellow card) 4× (suspension)	Report	3× (yellow card) 3× (suspension)	Geneva; Attendance: 750; Referees: Antić, Jakovljević (SRB)

21 March 2012; 18:00	Ukraine	22 – 23	Spain	Palace of Sports, Zaporizhia; Attendance: 2,000; Referees: Horváth, Marton (HUN)
21 March 2012; 18:00	Nikolayenko 6	(12–13)	Martín 5	Palace of Sports, Zaporizhia; Attendance: 2,000; Referees: Horváth, Marton (HUN)
21 March 2012; 18:00	2× (yellow card) 4× (suspension)	Report	3× (yellow card) 5× (suspension)	Palace of Sports, Zaporizhia; Attendance: 2,000; Referees: Horváth, Marton (HUN)

22 March 2012; 19:30	Switzerland	19 – 26	Iceland	Sporthalle Kreuzbleiche, St.Gallen; Attendance: 1,600; Referees: Mayeuski, Tereshchenkov (BLR)
22 March 2012; 19:30	Mustafoska 8	(12–15)	Sigurðardóttir 7	Sporthalle Kreuzbleiche, St.Gallen; Attendance: 1,600; Referees: Mayeuski, Tereshchenkov (BLR)
22 March 2012; 19:30	2× (yellow card)	Report	3× (yellow card) 1× (suspension)	Sporthalle Kreuzbleiche, St.Gallen; Attendance: 1,600; Referees: Mayeuski, Tereshchenkov (BLR)

25 March 2012; 11:00	Spain	27 – 28	Ukraine	Pabellón Tierra Estella-Lizarrerria, Estella-Lizarra; Attendance: 750; Referees: Gubica, Milosevic (CRO)
25 March 2012; 11:00	Alberto 7	(13–10)	Laiuk 7	Pabellón Tierra Estella-Lizarrerria, Estella-Lizarra; Attendance: 750; Referees: Gubica, Milosevic (CRO)
25 March 2012; 11:00	3× (yellow card) 2× (suspension)	Report	3× (yellow card) 4× (suspension)	Pabellón Tierra Estella-Lizarrerria, Estella-Lizarra; Attendance: 750; Referees: Gubica, Milosevic (CRO)

25 March 2012; 16:00	Iceland	31 – 16	Switzerland	Vodafonehöllin, Hlíðarendi; Attendance: 600; Referees: Samuelsen, Hansen (FRO)
25 March 2012; 16:00	Knútsdóttir, Sigurðardóttir 6	(15–9)	Weigelt 4	Vodafonehöllin, Hlíðarendi; Attendance: 600; Referees: Samuelsen, Hansen (FRO)
25 March 2012; 16:00	3× (yellow card) 1× (suspension)	Report	3× (yellow card)	Vodafonehöllin, Hlíðarendi; Attendance: 600; Referees: Samuelsen, Hansen (FRO)

30 May 2012; 19:30	Iceland	21 – 18	Spain	Vodafonehöllin, Hlíðarendi; Attendance: 1,000; Referees: Togstad, Kristiansen (NOR)
30 May 2012; 19:30	three players 4	(8–10)	Aguilar 5	Vodafonehöllin, Hlíðarendi; Attendance: 1,000; Referees: Togstad, Kristiansen (NOR)
30 May 2012; 19:30	3× (yellow card) 4× (suspension)	Report	3× (yellow card) 1× (suspension)	Vodafonehöllin, Hlíðarendi; Attendance: 1,000; Referees: Togstad, Kristiansen (NOR)

31 May 2012; 19:30	Switzerland	25 – 27	Ukraine	Ruebisbachhalle, Kloten; Attendance: 650; Referees: Mykolaitis, Sniurevicius (LTU)
31 May 2012; 19:30	Mustafoska 6	(14–15)	Borshchenko 11	Ruebisbachhalle, Kloten; Attendance: 650; Referees: Mykolaitis, Sniurevicius (LTU)
31 May 2012; 19:30	2× (yellow card) 3× (suspension)	Report	2× (yellow card) 5× (suspension)	Ruebisbachhalle, Kloten; Attendance: 650; Referees: Mykolaitis, Sniurevicius (LTU)

2 June 2012; 18:00	Spain	29 – 19	Switzerland	Aguas Vivas, Guadalajara; Attendance: 1,000; Referees: Di Domenico, Fornasier (ITA)
2 June 2012; 18:00	Aguilar, Pinedo 4	(15–8)	Willimann 4	Aguas Vivas, Guadalajara; Attendance: 1,000; Referees: Di Domenico, Fornasier (ITA)
2 June 2012; 18:00	3× (yellow card) 5× (suspension)	Report	3× (yellow card) 4× (suspension)	Aguas Vivas, Guadalajara; Attendance: 1,000; Referees: Di Domenico, Fornasier (ITA)

3 June 2012; 17:00	Ukraine	22 – 20	Iceland	Palace of Sports, Zaporizhia; Attendance: 1,000; Referees: Sivak, Dvorsky (SVK)
3 June 2012; 17:00	Borshchenko 5	(15–11)	Knútsdóttir, Skúladóttir 4	Palace of Sports, Zaporizhia; Attendance: 1,000; Referees: Sivak, Dvorsky (SVK)
3 June 2012; 17:00	3× (yellow card) 3× (suspension)	Report	3× (yellow card) 5× (suspension)	Palace of Sports, Zaporizhia; Attendance: 1,000; Referees: Sivak, Dvorsky (SVK)
