= British handball team =

British handball team may refer to:

- Great Britain men's national handball team, Great Britain's men's team
- Great Britain women's national handball team, Great Britain's women's team
