= Marija Jovanović =

Marija Jovanović may refer to:

- Marija Jovanović (Montenegrin handballer) (born 1985), Montenegrin handballer
- Marija Jovanović (Serbian handballer) (born 1995), Serbian handballer
- Marija Jovanović (powerlifter) (born 1999), Serbian powerlifter
- Marija Jovanovich (born 1982), Australian military test pilot
