= Sarah Hargreaves =

British handball player

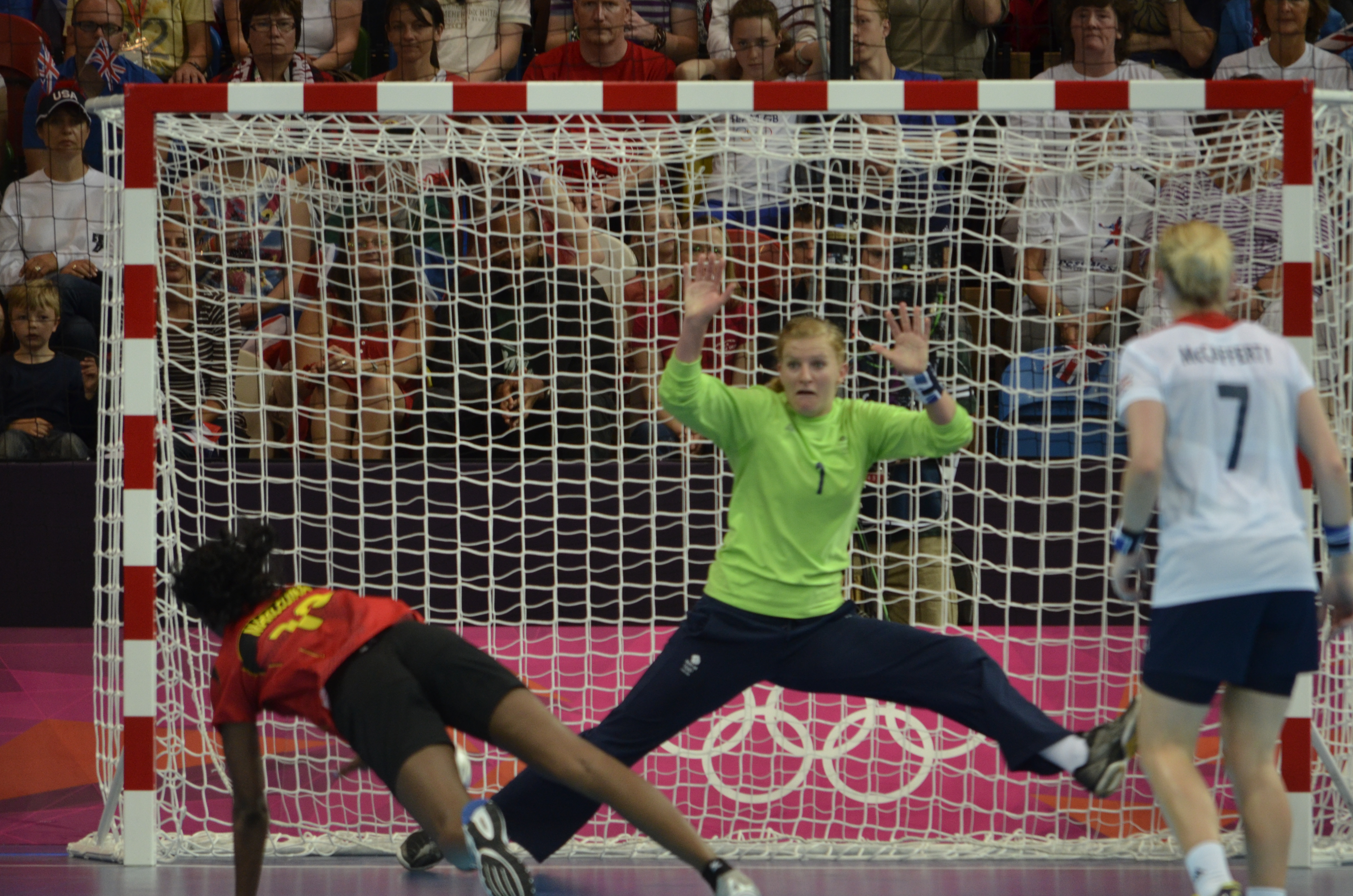

Personal information
- Nationality: British / Danish
- Born: 17 May 1989 (age 37) Fårevejle, Zealand, Denmark
- Height: 185 cm (73 in)

Sport
- Sport: Handball
- Position: Goalkeeper

Senior clubs
- Years: Team
- –: Quick 70
- –: HK Lammefjorden
- –: Vejlby-Risskov Idrætsklub
- –: TMS Ringsted
- –: Team Esbjerg
- –: Slagelse FH
- –: Holbæk HK
National team
- Years: Team
- –: Great Britain

Sarah Hargreaves (born 17 May 1989, Fårevejle, Sjælland) is a British-Danish handball goalkeeper. She has played for the British national team, qualifying thanks to her British father, and competed at the 2012 Summer Olympics in London. At the time of her participation in the 2012 Olympics, her club is Slagelse FH. She was one of only two players in the squad, along with Kelsi Fairbrother, to remain with her club team instead of joining the British programme in Crystal Palace.
