= Daniela Todor =

Romanian handball player (born 1988)

Personal information
- Full name: Daniela Elena Todor
- Nationality: Romanian
- Born: 18 November 1988 (age 37) Râmnicu Vâlcea, Romania
- Height: 1.72 m (5 ft 8 in)

Sport
- Sport: Handball
- Position: Centre Back
- Current club: Rapid București
- Number: 18

Senior clubs
- Years: Team
- 2005–2013: Oltchim Râmnicu Vâlcea
- 2008–2011: → HC Zalău (loan)
- 2012–2013: → SCM Craiova (loan)
- 2013–2015: HCM Roman
- 2015–2017: SCM Craiova
- 2018: CSM Roman
- 2018-2019: Gloria Bistrița
- 2020-: Rapid București
National team
Years	Team	Apps	(Gls)
–	Romania	30	(61)

Daniela Todor (née Băbeanu; born 18 November 1988) is a Romanian handballer who plays for Rapid București.

== International honours ==
- EHF Champions League:
  - Semifinalist: 2012
