= Yvonne Leuthold =

British handball player

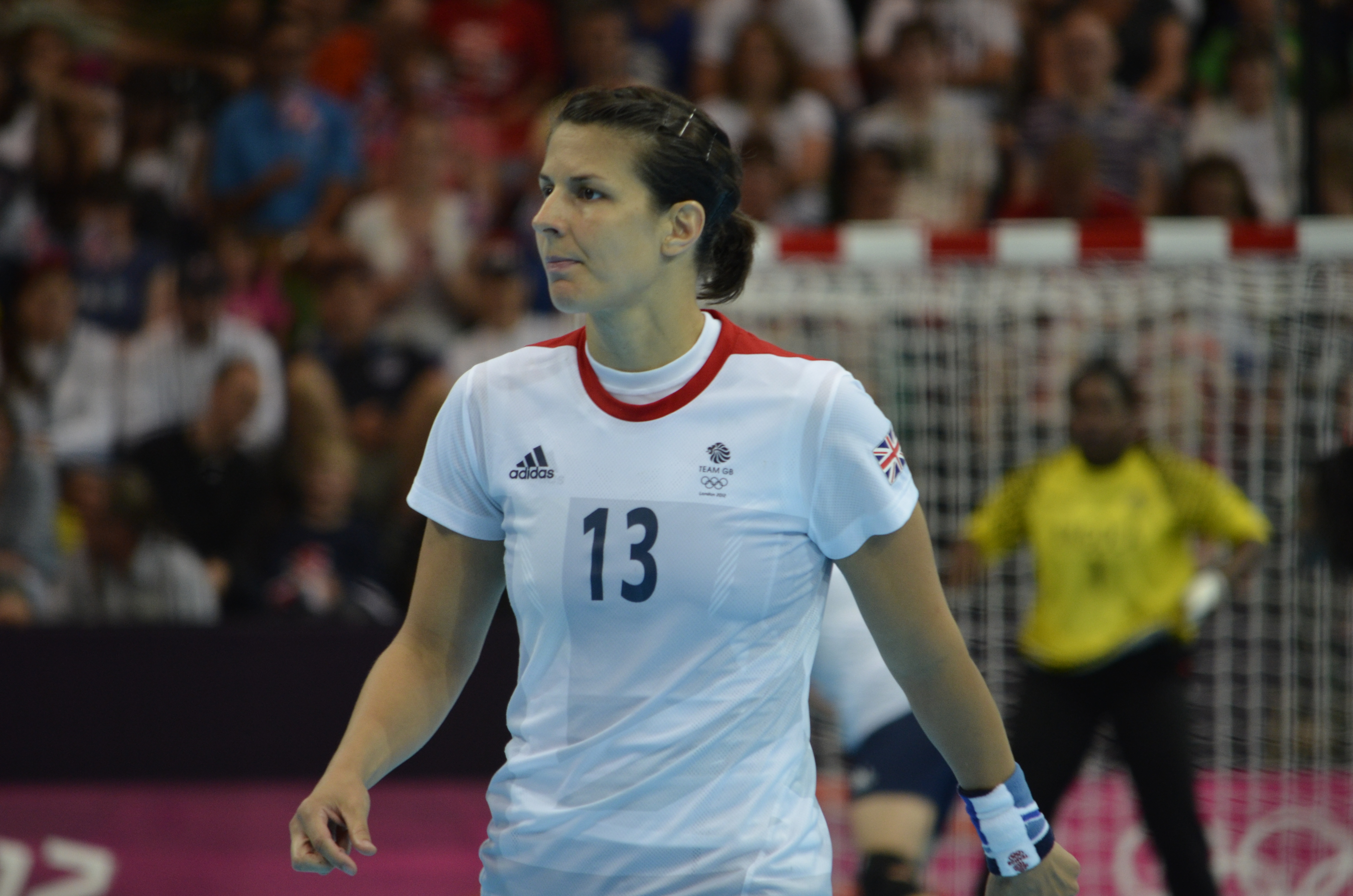
- Yvonne Leuthold, a handball player from the UK national team at the 2012 Summer Olympics

Personal information
- Nationality: British-Swiss
- Born: 30 January 1980 (age 46) Bern, Switzerland
- Height: 178 cm (70 in)

Sport
- Sport: Handball
- Position: Right back
- Current club: DHB Rotweiss Thun (coach)

Senior clubs
- Years: Team
- –2009: (Switzerland) DHB Rotweiss Thun
- 2009–2010: (Germany) SG BBM Bietigheim
- 2010–2011: (Germany) SV Allensbach
- 2012–2016: (Switzerland) DHB Rotweiss Thun
National team
Years	Team	Apps
–	Switzerland	34
–	Great Britain	

Teams managed
- 2023–2024: DHB Rotweiss Thun (assistant)
- 2024–: DHB Rotweiss Thun

Yvonne Leuthold (born 30 January 1980) is a British-Swiss former handball player and current coach for Swiss team DHB Rotweiss Thun. She played both for the British national team and the Swiss national team. She competed at the 2012 Summer Olympics in London, representing Britain. She was born in Bern but qualified to represent Great Britain through her Welsh father.

A right back, Leuthold began her career with the University of Bern's handball team. From 2003 to 2009, she played with DHB Rotweiss Thun. Following her spell with the club, she left to play in Germany with SG BBM Bietigheim and SV Allensbach. Following the Olympics, she returned to DHB Rotweiss Thun, playing there until her retirement in 2017.

In 2019, she was elected to the board of the SPAR Premium League. In the 2023-24 season she was the assistant coach to her former team DHB Rotweiss Thun, and the season after she took over as the head coach.
