= Małgorzata Stasiak =

Polish handball player (born 1988)

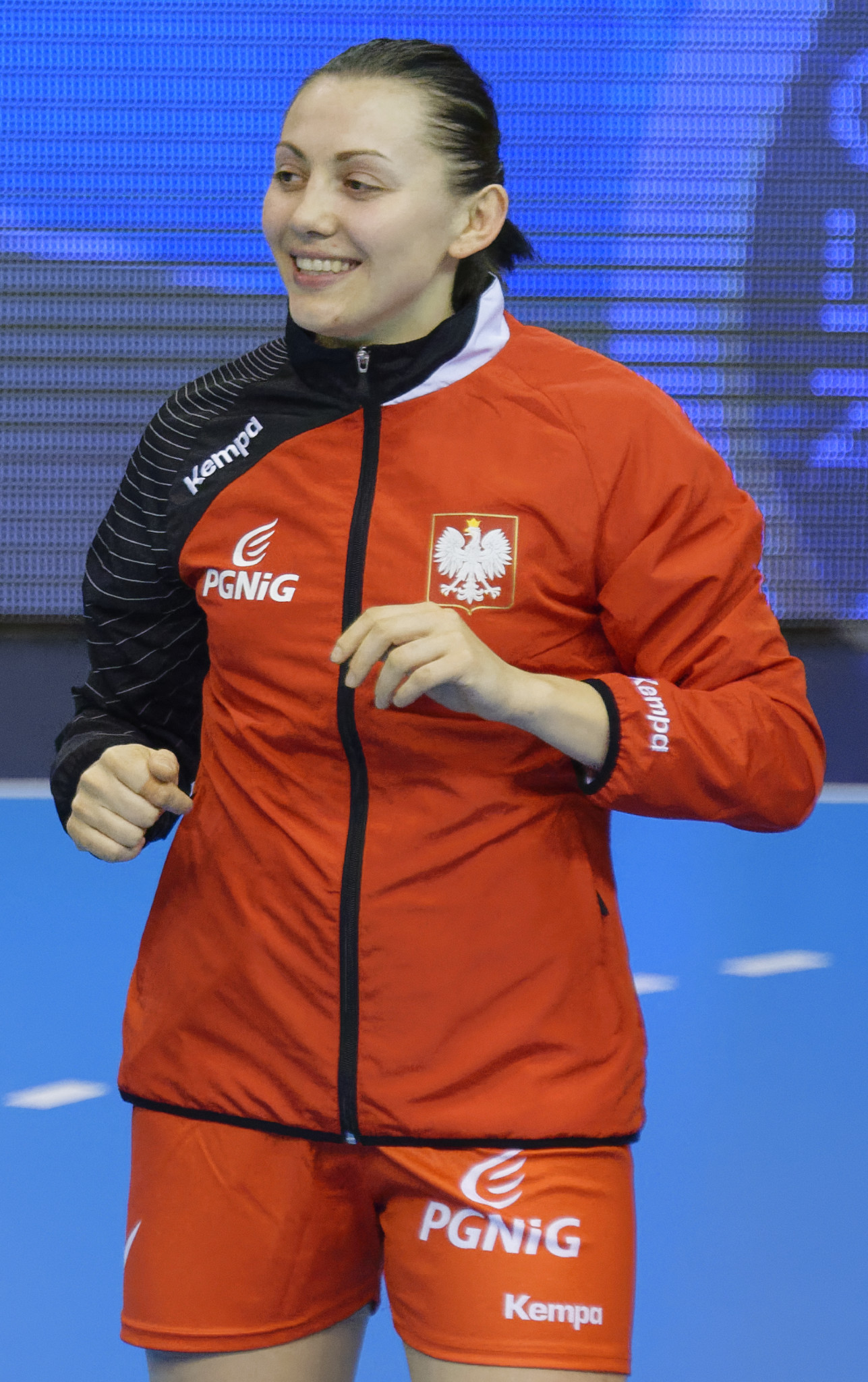

Personal information
- Nationality: Polish
- Born: 5 November 1988 (age 37) Skwierzyna, Poland
- Height: 1.79 m (5 ft 10 in)

Sport
- Sport: Handball
- Position: Left back
- Current club: SPR Pogoń Szczecin
- Number: 15
National team
Years	Team	Apps	(Gls)
–	Poland	44	(76)

Małgorzata Stasiak (born 5 November 1988) is a Polish handball player. She plays for the club SPR Pogoń Szczecin the Polish national team and represented Poland at the 2013 World Women's Handball Championship in Serbia.
