= Louise Jukes =

British handball player

Personal information
- Nationality: British
- Born: 14 April 1984 (age 42) Ashford, Kent
- Height: 169 cm (67 in)

Sport
- Sport: Handball
National team
- Years: Team
- –: Great Britain

Louise Jukes (born 14 April 1984) is a British handball player. She has played for the British national team, and competed at the 2012 Summer Olympics in London. She was born in Ashford, Kent.

Prior to taking up handball, Jukes was a hockey player, representing England at under-18s level and playing for Old Loughtonians Hockey Club. She became a handball player after taking part in the Sporting Giants scheme.

Following the Olympics, Jukes helped found Ipswich Handball Club, alongside David Hendrick.
