= Marija Jovanović (powerlifter) =

Serbian powerlifter

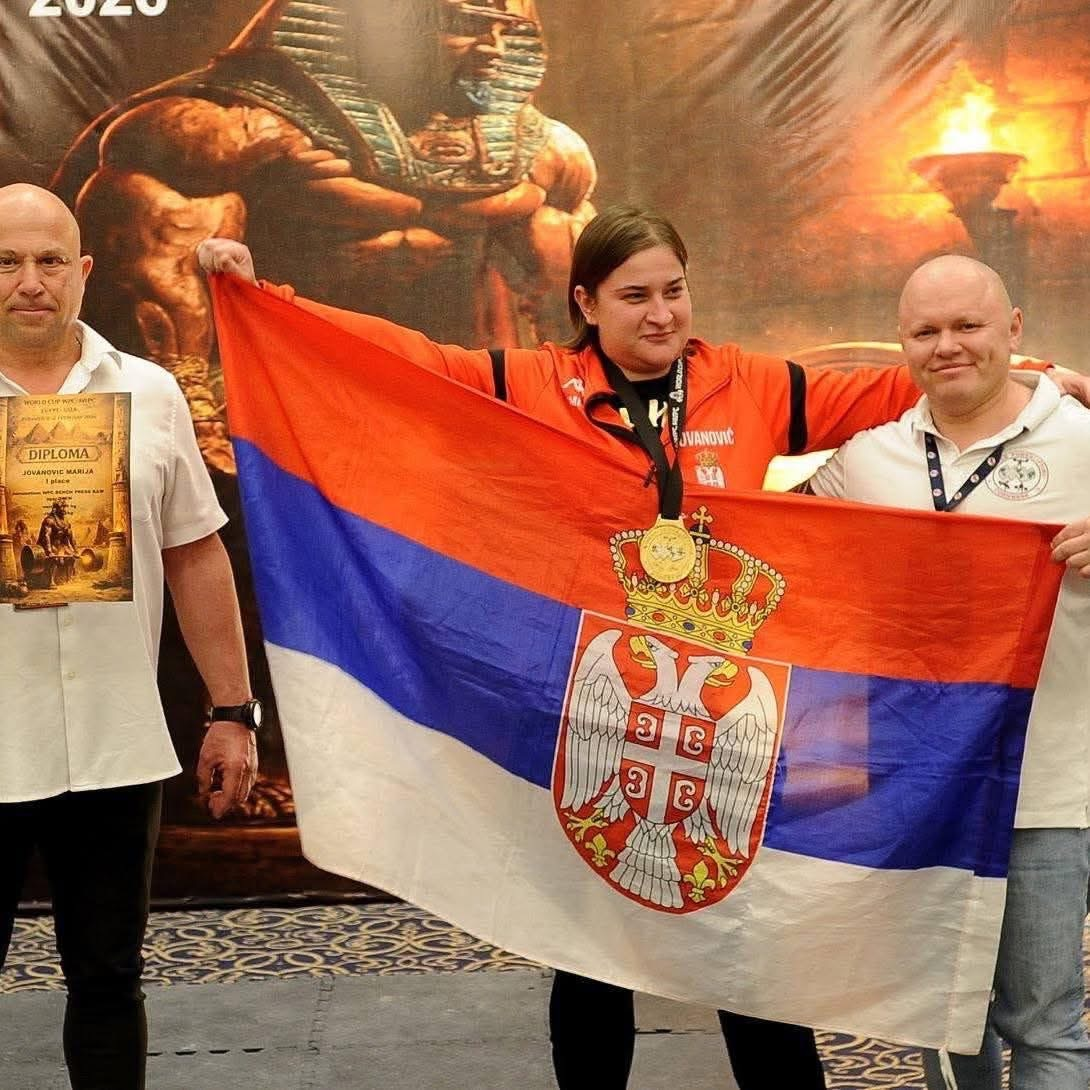
- Marija Jovanović at the 2026 World Powerlifting Cup in Cairo, Egypt

Personal information
- Native name: Марија Јовановић
- Born: 24 April 1999 (age 27) Paraćin, Serbia
- Height: 167 cm (5 ft 6 in)
- Weight: 92 kg (203 lb)

Sport
- Sport: Powerlifting
- Club: Dušan Silni, Belgrade
- Coached by: Dušan Jovanović

Marija Jovanović (Serbian: Марија Јовановић; born 24 April 1999) is a Serbian powerlifter. She won a gold medal at the World Cup in Egypt and holds six Serbian national records.

== Early life ==
Marija Jovanović was born in Paraćin, Serbia. She began competing in powerlifting in 2018. She has represented Serbia at international powerlifting competitions.

== Career ==
Marija Jovanović has been competing in powerlifting since 2018. As a junior, she held the national record in the bench press in the +84 kg weight category. During her career, she broke the national bench press record six times.

She is a two-time Balkan champion in powerlifting, having won gold medals at the Balkan Championships on two occasions. At the World Cup in Cairo, Egypt, she won the gold medal in her category. She trains under the guidance of coach Dušan Jovanović and competes for the club "Dušan Silni" from Belgrade.

== Results ==
Date	Competition	Location	Representing	Result
8 February 2026	World Cup in Powerlifting	Egypt Cairo, Egypt	Serbia	🥇 Gold
25 April 2026	Open Montenegro Powerlifting Championship	Montenegro Budva, Montenegro	Serbia	🥇 Gold
2 November 2025	Open Montenegro Powerlifting Championship	Montenegro Cetinje, Montenegro	Serbia	🥇 Gold
27 December 2019	International Powerlifting Competition	Bosnia and Herzegovina Bosnia and Herzegovina	Serbia	🥇 Gold
2 April 2018	International Powerlifting Competition	Bosnia and Herzegovina Bosnia and Herzegovina	Serbia	🥇 Gold

== National competition results ==
Date	Competition	Location	Division	Weight class	Medal
11 October 2018	Serbian National Bench Press Championship	Serbia	Open	84+ kg	🥇 Gold
1 December 2018	Serbian Championships	Serbia	Sub-Junior 17–19	90 kg	🥇 Gold
30 November 2019	Serbian National Bench Press Championship	Serbia	Junior	84+ kg	🥇 Gold
24 April 2021	Serbian Open Bench Press Cup	Serbia	Open	84+ kg	🥇 Gold
11 September 2021	Serbian National Bench Press Championship	Serbia	Junior	84+ kg	🥇 Gold
16 April 2022	Serbia Open Bench Press	Serbia	Junior	84+ kg	🥇 Gold
8 June 2024	Serbian National Bench Press Championship	Serbia	Open	84+ kg	🥈 Silver
