= Britt Goodwin =

Norwegian-British handball player (born 1983)

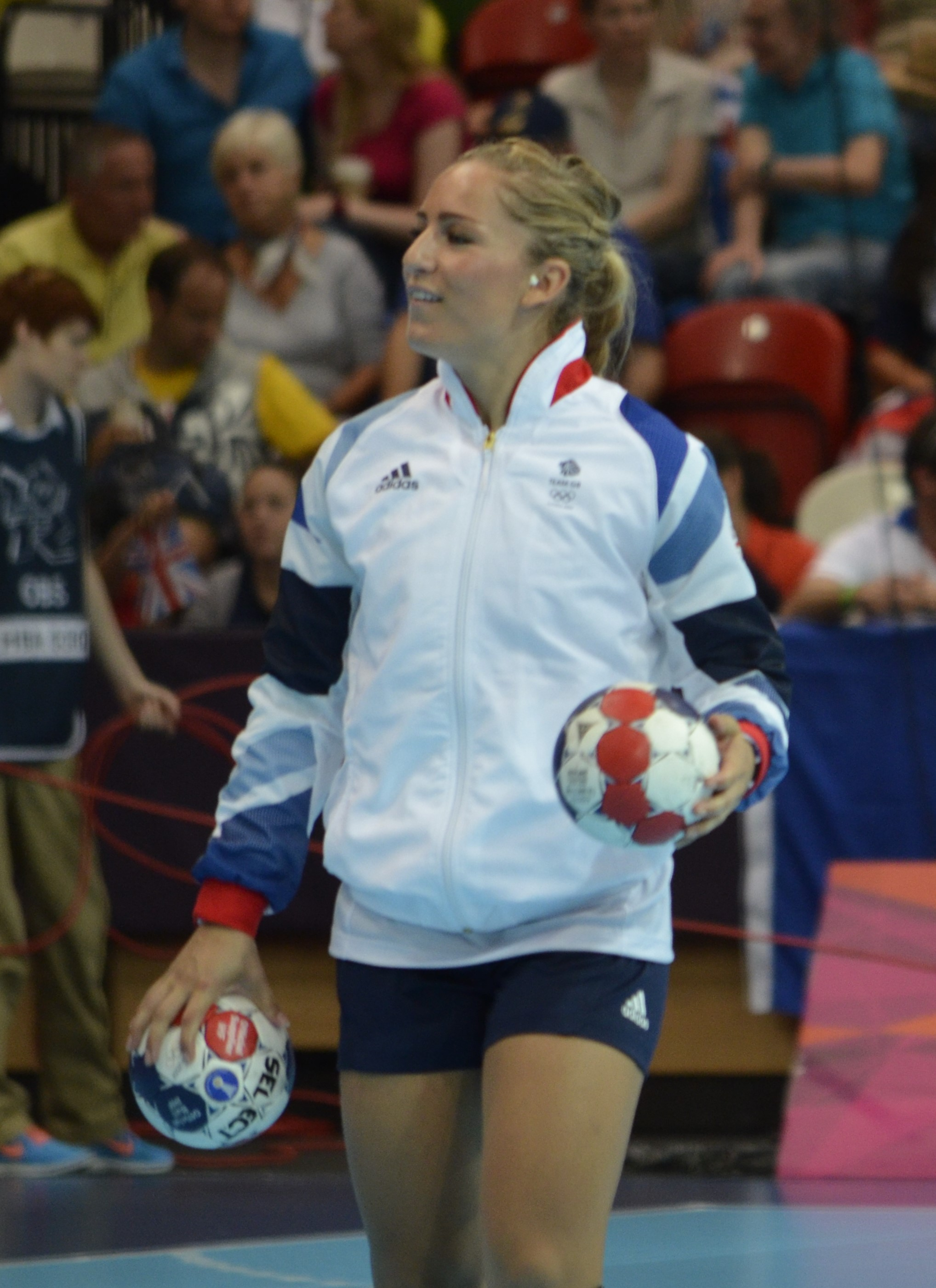
- 2012 Summer Olympics - handball

Personal information
- Nationality: Norwegian / British
- Born: 24 April 1983 (age 43) Gjøvik, Norway
- Height: 163 cm (64 in)

Sport
- Sport: Handball
- Position: Left wing

Senior clubs
- Years: Team
- 2002-2008: Gjøvik og Vardal HK
- 2008-2009: Toten HK
- 2009-2010: Fjellhammer IL
- 2010-2011: Asker SK
National team
- Years: Team
- –: Great Britain

Britt Goodwin (born 24 April 1983) is a Norwegian-British Olympic handball player. She was born in Gjøvik.

She played for the British national team, and competed at the 2012 Summer Olympics in London.

In league handball she has played for Gjøvik og Vardal HK (2002-2008), Toten HK (2008-2009), Fjellhammer IL (2009-2010) and Asker SK (2010-2011).

She works as a nurse at Akershus University Hospital. She was the winner of the 2005 season of the Swedish-Norwegian reality television show Big Brother.
