= Vigdis Holmeset =

British handball coach

Vigdis Holmeset (born 27 April 1971) is a Norwegian handball coach, known for coaching various Norwegian and British handball teams.

== Career ==
In 2012, Holmeset was coach of the Great Britain women's national handball team at the Summer Olympics.

She has coached Stabæk Håndball in two periods; from 1997 to 2003 and from 2013 to 2014.

In 2015, Holmeset coached Norway's under-17 women's handball team alongside Kenneth Gabrielsen. They entered the European Women's U-17 Handball Championship that year.

In 2017, Holmeset was coach of Norway's under-19 women's handball team. She led the team for the 2017 Women's U-19 European Handball Championship, coming top of their group in the qualifying stages. They finished in 7th place after defeating the Montenegrin team 28–23.

Holmeset won a silver medal as coach of the Norwegian women's team at the 2018 Women's Beach Handball World Championships. She was later shortlisted for the 2018/19 Female Coach of the Season award by the European Handball Federation.
