= Holly Lam-Moores =

British handball player

Personal information
- Nationality: English
- Born: 12 July 1990 (age 36) Lancashire, England
- Height: 1.68 m (5 ft 6 in)

Sport
- Sport: Handball
- Position: Left Wing

Senior clubs
- Years: Team
- –: Haslingden Handball Club
- –: Grenaa
- –: SK Aarhus
- 2009-2010: Asker SK
- 2010: AGF Håndbold
- 2010-2011: SønderjyskE Håndbold
- 2012-2013: Viborg HK
National team
Years	Team	Apps	(Gls)
–	Great Britain	50	(130)

Holly Lam-Moores (born 12 September 1990) is a British team handball player playing as a left back.

Born in Burnley, Lancashire to an English father and a Chinese mother, Lam-Moores started playing handball aged 12 at Alder Grange High School in Rawtenstall after it had been introduced by coach Bill Baillie. She later joined Haslingden Handball Club on Baillie's recommendation. She made her debut in Great Britain women's national handball team in 2006. In 2010, Lam-Moores was named Handball Player of the Year by the British Olympic Association.

In 2012, she was named as a member of the Great Britain's first ever Olympic women's handball team at the 2012 London Olympics. A week after, it was revealed that Lam-Moores had signed a one-year professional contract with the Danish club Viborg HK. It was revealed soon after the Olympic campaign had begun that she was suffering from a stress fracture of the spine. Despite this set back, she was able to score two goals in Great Britain Women's second Olympic game against Russia. With Viborg she won the Danish Women's Handball Cup in 2013.
