= Ewa Palies =

British handball player

Personal information
- Nationality: British
- Born: 30 January 1989 (age 37) Montpellier, France

Sport
- Sport: Handball
National team
- Years: Team
- –: Great Britain

Ewa Palies (born 30 January 1989) is a British handball player. She plays for the British national team, and competed at the 2012 Summer Olympics in London. She was born in Montpellier. At the time of her call up to the Olympic squad, she played club handball for Plan de Cuques and has a master's degree in chemistry.
