= Jane Mayes =

Danish-British handball player (born 1989)

Personal information
- Born: 10 January 1989 (age 37) Esbjerg, Denmark
- Height: 173 cm (5 ft 8 in) (2012)
- Weight: 83 kg (183 lb) (2012)

Sport
- Sport: Handball
- Position: Goalkeeper
- Team: Team Esbjerg; Great Britain women's national handball team

Jane Mayes (born 10 January 1989) is a Danish-British handball goalkeeper. She plays for Team Esbjerg and the British national team, and competed at the 2012 Summer Olympics in London.

== Early life ==
Mayes was born on 10 January 1989 in Esbjerg to Richard John Mayes and Pia Mayes.

Mayes has played handball since the age of six.

Her father, Richard John Mayes died of lung cancer in 1999.

In 2007, she broke into the British national team for handball.

In 2010, she was selected by Team GB to be part of a pool of potential handball Olympians and lost 6 stone to make the team.

== 2012 Olympics ==
She competed for Team GB in Women's Handball at the 2012 Summer Olympics in London.
