= Klára Černá =

Czech handball player

Personal information
- Nationality: Czech
- Born: 29 January 1985 (age 41) Pardubice, Czechoslovakia
- Height: 1.71 m (5 ft 7 in)

Sport
- Sport: Handball
- Position: Right back
- Current club: Slavia Prague
- Number: 10
National team
Years	Team	Apps	(Gls)
–	Czech Republic	63	(188)

Klára Černá (born 29 January 1985) is a Czech handball player for Slavia Prague and the Czech national team.
