= Nina Heglund =

Norwegian-British handball player (born 1993)

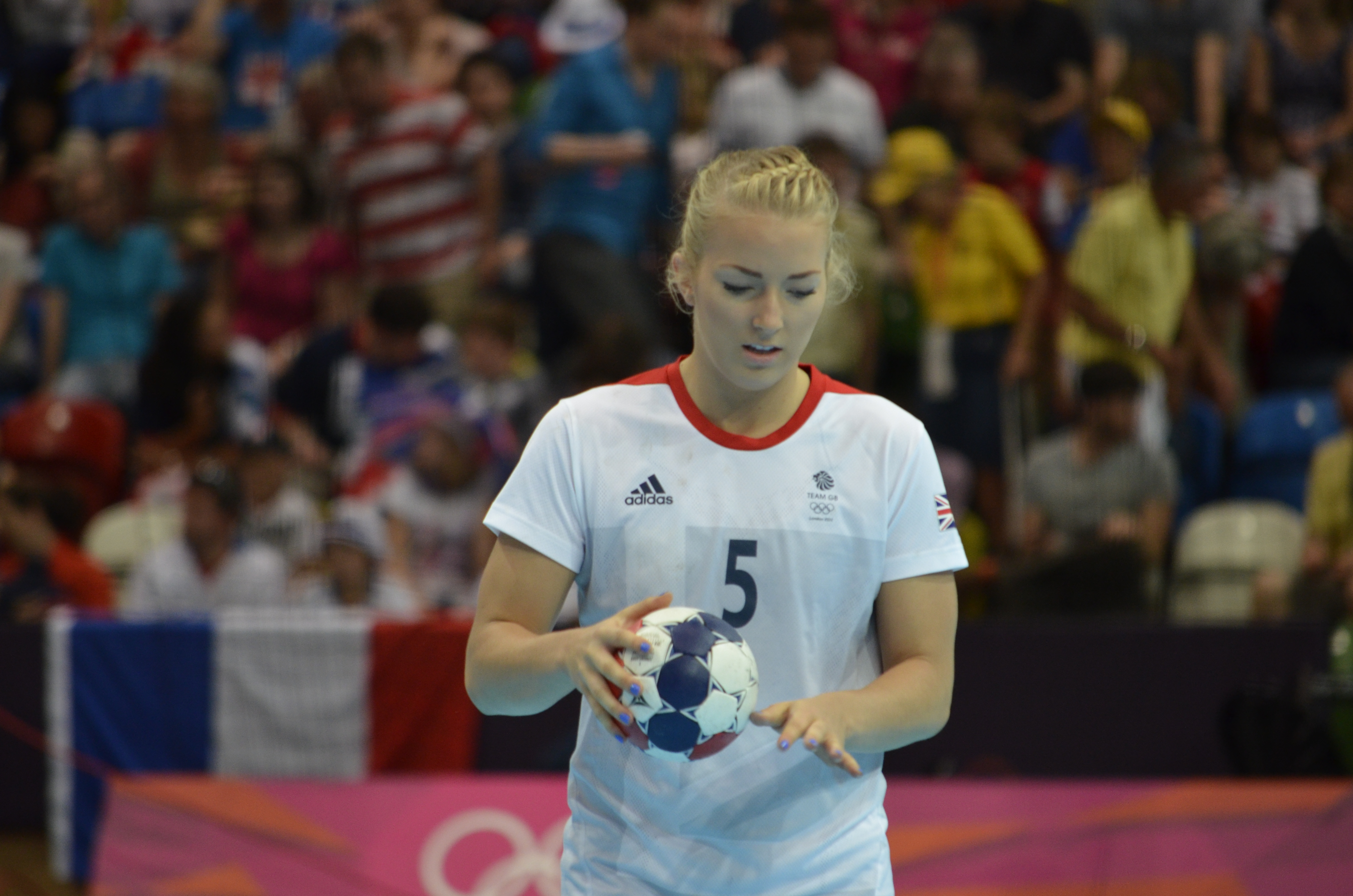
- Nina Heglund at the 2012 Summer Olympics

Personal information
- Nationality: Norwegian / British
- Born: 24 July 1993 (age 33) Oslo, Norway
- Height: 170 cm (67 in)

Sport
- Sport: Handball
- Position: Centre back

Senior clubs
- Years: Team
- -2011: Asker SK
- 2012-2014: Glassverket IF
- 2014-2015: Flint Tønsberg
National team
| Years | Team | Apps |
| – | Great Britain | 38 |

Nina Heglund (born 24 July 1993) is a Norwegian-British handball player. She plays for the British national team, and competed at the 2012 Summer Olympics in London. Aged 19 at the start of the games, she was the youngest player in the squad. Heglund has a Scottish mother and is a dual citizen of Norway and the United Kingdom. She plays for the Norwegian team Asker SK.
