= Lynn McCafferty =

British handball player

Personal information
- Nationality: British
- Born: 16 April 1979 (age 47) Coatbridge

Sport
- Sport: Handball
National team
- Years: Team
- –: Great Britain

Lynn McCafferty (born 16 April 1979) is a British handball player, born in Coatbridge. She has played for the British national team, and competed at the 2012 Summer Olympics in London.

== Early life ==
McCafferty was born in Coatbridge on 16 April 1979, and grew up in the North Lanarkshire town of Cumbernauld, part of the Glasgow metropolitan area in Scotland. She attended Our Lady's High School in Cumbernauld, which was also attended by Scotland footballer and fellow 2012 Olympian Ifeoma Dieke.

== Career ==
McCafferty began playing handball at the age of ten, when she joined the Tryst 77 handball club in Cumbernauld. After progressing through the club's ranks, she was selected for the first team at the age of fifteen, making her debut in the now-defunct British League. In August 2006, McCafferty left Cumbernauld and moved to Denmark, together with four male Tryst 77 players including husband Gary McCafferty. The purpose of the move was to receive training in elite facilities in Denmark, a country where handball is a popular spectator sport and receives greater attention than in the United Kingdom, boosting their chances of selection for the 2012 Olympic Games in London. The players were among 61 Scottish recipients of a grant for athletes from the National Lottery and they were trained at the Aarhus Sports Academy by Carsten Albrektsen, the coach of Danish club Bjerringbro-Silkeborg, who had been recruited by Team GB to help train potential Olympic players. As well as training McCafferty began playing competitively in Denmark, for the Nyborg GIF club in the country's third division.

In 2009, funding for the training programme in Denmark ceased, and McCafferty had to look for professional a contract to continue her career. After initially moving to Norway, McCafferty eventually spent the 2009–10 season in Italy, playing for the SSV Brixen club in the country's second tier, taking advantage of the club's intensive training regime and increased game play to improve her skills and fitness. The following season she returned to Denmark, starting the 2010–11 season with Hadsten Sports Klub Håndbold of the second division before moving mid-season to Aarhus-based AGF Håndbold, who played in the Danish 1st Division, the country's second tier.

From at least 2008, McCafferty was selected as captain of the Great Britain women's national handball team, which had not previously competed and was formed with the specific goal of competing at the 2012 Olympics. Like McCafferty, many of the national team's elite players had trained at Aarhus and then played in the leagues of various European countries. In late 2010, British Handball reached a deal allowing the team to train at the Crystal Palace National Sports Centre from the end of the season in May 2011. The players were not fully funded, and were expected to seek outside employment, but the deal allowed the team to train and play together on a regular basis for a year prior to the 2012 Games.

McCafferty went on to captain the Great Britain side in the 2012 Olympics. The team lost the opener at the Copper Box Arena on 28 July against Montenegro, their first ever Olympic game, by a score of 31–19, but the team played well and the match was close until the final ten minutes when the Montenegrans took advantage of British fatigue. McCafferty was among the scorers in the game, and later praised the side's performance in an interview with BBC Sport. The team went on to lose the remainder of their games in Group A of the tournament, and were eliminated from the competition. McCafferty retired after the Olympics, and returned home to Cumbernauld.
