= Marie Gerbron =

French-British handball player (born 1986)

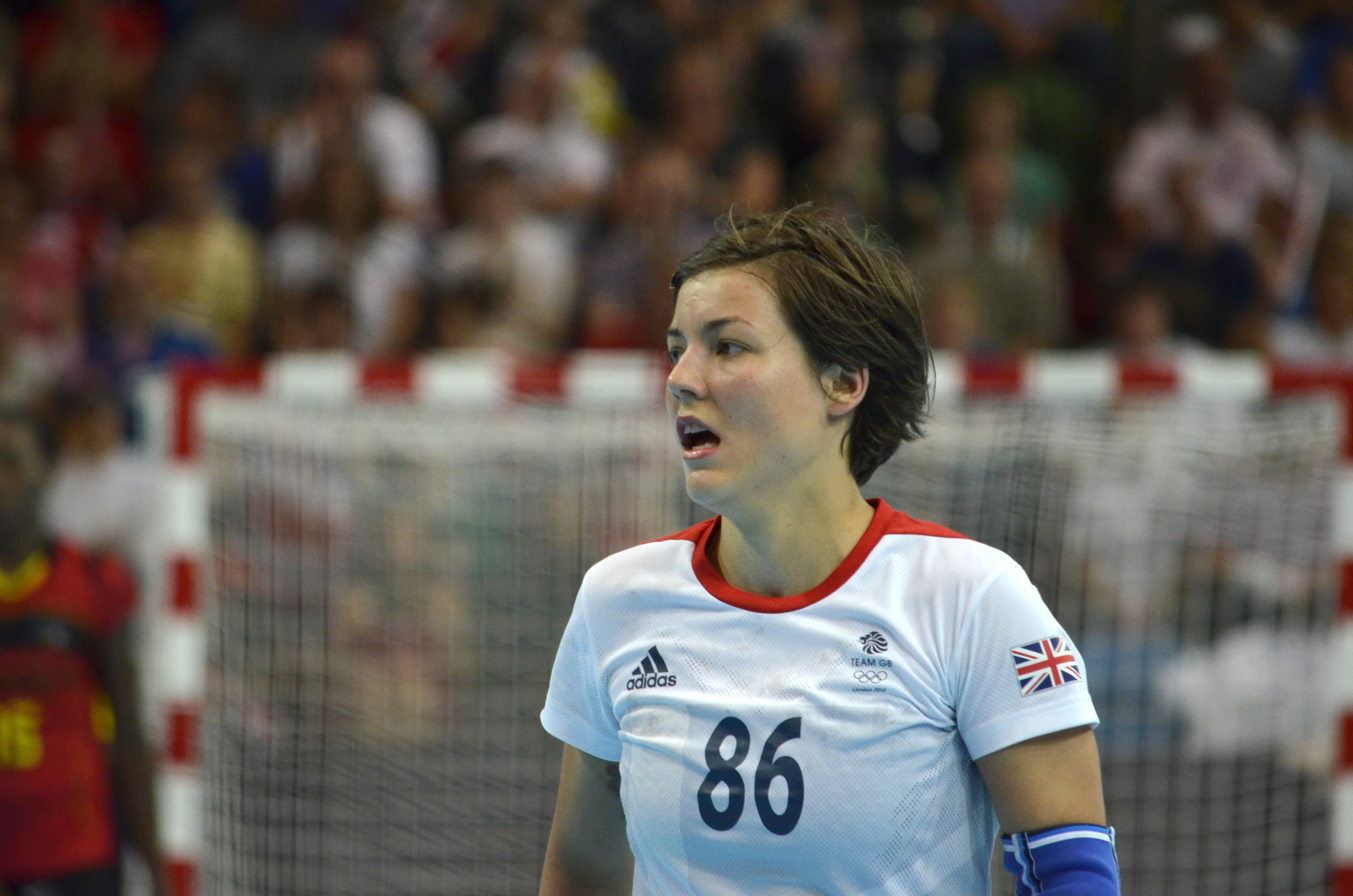

Personal information
- Nationality: British / French
- Born: 23 December 1986 (age 39) Harfleur, France
- Height: 166 cm (65 in)

Sport
- Sport: Handball
- Position: Right back / right wing

Senior clubs
- Years: Team
- -2009: Le Havre AC
- 2009-2012: HB Octeville
- 2012-2013: Bravo HK
- 2016-2018: HB Octeville
National team
- Years: Team
- –: Great Britain

Teams managed
- 2014-2015: Bravo HK

Marie Gerbron (born 23 December 1986, Harfleur) is a French-British handball player. She plays as a right winger.

She played for the British national team, and competed at the 2012 Summer Olympics in London.

== Club career ==
Gerbron began playing handball as a school child and won the French Cup in 2006. From 2006 to 2009, she played with Le Havre AC, winning the Cup Winners' Cup three times. In 2012, she was playing club handball with French second tier side Octeville.

== International career ==
Gerbron made her debut for Great Britain in 2010, qualifying for the team through her British mother. She made her Olympic debut against Montenegro, scoring six goals in a 31-19 defeat. She scored nine goals against Angola in the final game of the group stage. Great Britain lost all of their games in the tournament but media praised Gerbron's performances.
