= Zoe van der Weel =

British handball player (born 1990)

Zoë van der Weel
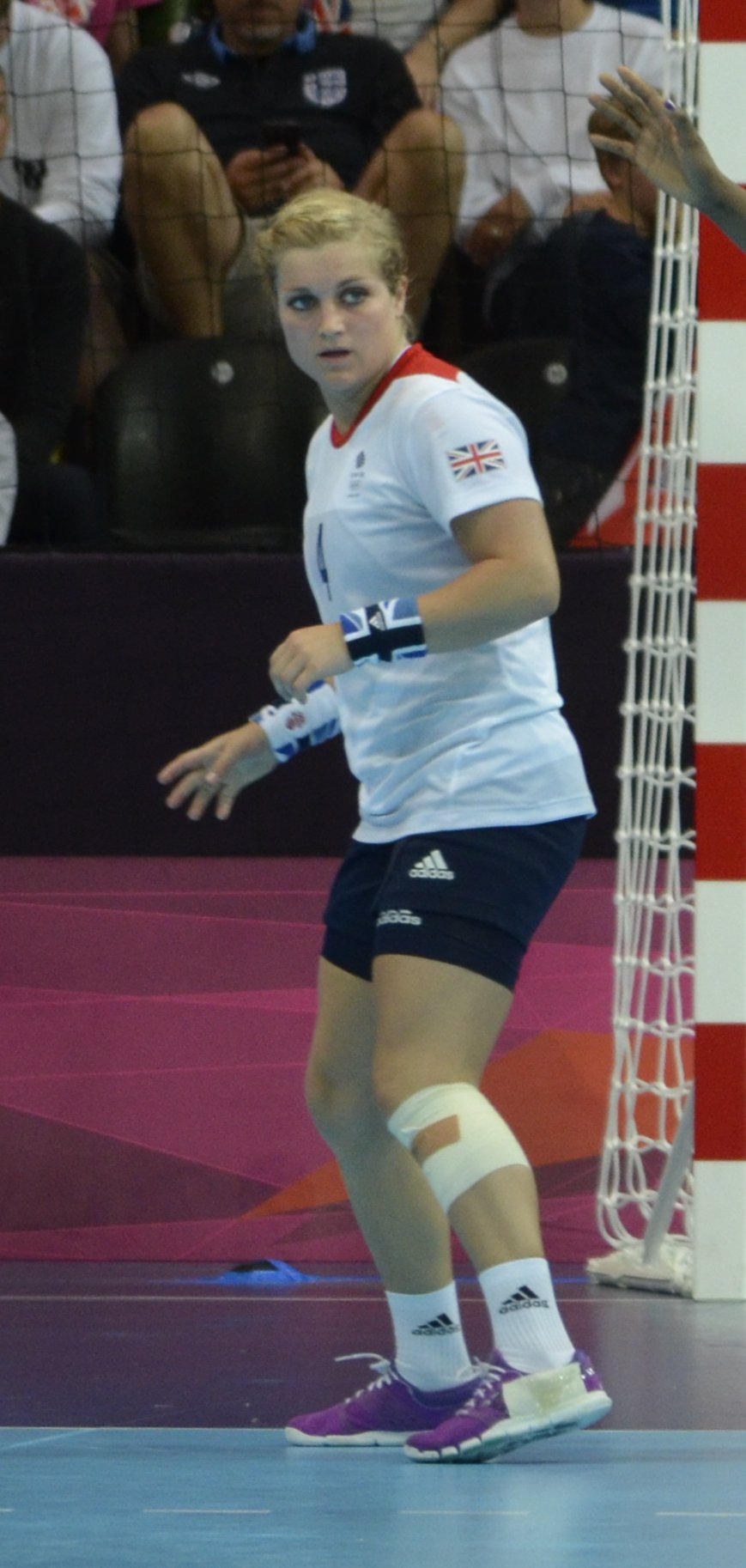
- Zoë van der Weel at the 2012 Summer Olympics

Personal information
- Full name: Zoë Hélène Frédérique van der Weel
- Nationality: British / Norwegian
- Born: 14 November 1990 (age 35) Edinburgh, Scotland
- Height: 1.61 m (5 ft 3 in)

Sport
- Sport: Handball
- Position: Right wing
- Current club: Retired
- Number: 4

Senior clubs
- Years: Team
- 2007-2008: Byåsen HE
- 2008-2009: Selbu IL
- 2009-2010: Byåsen HE
- 2010-2011: Nordstrand IF
- 2012-2016: Njård IL
- 2016-2020: Aker Topphåndball
National team
Years	Team	Apps
2012	Great Britain	5

Zoë van der Weel (born 14 November 1990) is a British-Norwegian retired handball player, who plays for the Norwegian club Aker Topphåndball. She played for the British national team, and competed at the 2012 Summer Olympics in London. van der Weel was born in Edinburgh to Dutch parents and moved to Trondheim in Norway at age five. She is a dual citizen of Norway and the United Kingdom. She has played for the Norwegian teams Byåsen IL and Nordstrand IF, and studied sports biology at the Norwegian School of Sport Sciences.
