= Verónica Cuadrado =

Spanish handball player (born 1979)

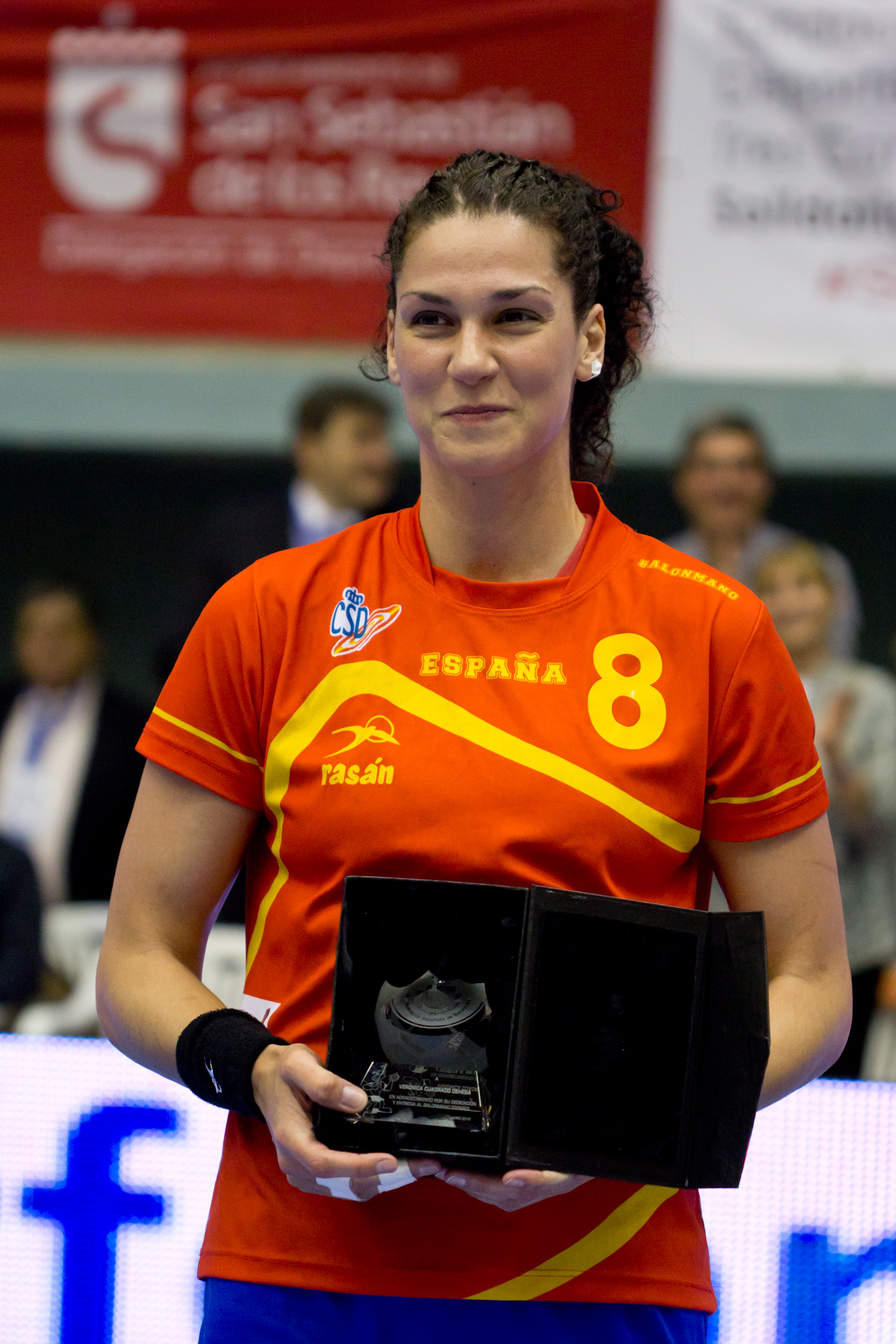
- Cuadrado in 2013

Personal information
- Full name: Verónica María Cuadrado Dehesa
- Born: 8 March 1979 (age 47) Santander, Cantabria, Spain
- Height: 1.82 m (6 ft 0 in)

Sport
- Sport: Handball
- Position: Pivot

Senior clubs
- Years: Team
- 1996-1997: BM Erandio 2000
- 1997-1999: CB Cantabria
- 1999-2002: BM Bera Bera
- 2002-2004: SD Itxako
- 2004-2011: BM Sagunto
- 2011-2012: Randers HK
- 2012-2013: KIF Vejen
- 2013-2015: Randers HK
National team
Years	Team	Apps	(Gls)
1999-2013	Spain	180	(228)
Medal record
Women's handball
Representing Spain
Olympic Games
Bronze medal – third place	2012 London	Team
World Championship
Bronze medal – third place	2011 Brazil	Team
European Championship
Silver medal – second place	2008 Macedonia	Team
Mediterranean Games
Gold medal – first place	2005 Almería	Team
Silver medal – second place	2001 Tunis	Team

Verónica María Cuadrado Dehesa (Note: In this Spanish name, the first or paternal surname is Cuadrado and the second or maternal family name is Dehesa.) (born 8 March 1979 in Santander, Cantabria) is a former Spanish handball player who was member of the Spanish women's national team.

She was part of the Spanish team at the 2008 European Women's Handball Championship, where the Spanish team reached the final, after defeating Germany in the semifinal.

Cuadrado was a member of the Spanish team that won the bronze medal at the 2011 World Handball Championships. She was also part of the Spanish team that won bronze at the 2012 Summer Olympics.
