= Kathryn Fudge =

British handball player

Personal information
- Nationality: British
- Born: 10 November 1989 (age 36) Bury, Greater Manchester
- Height: 183 cm (72 in)

Sport
- Sport: Handball
- Position: Left Back
- Current club: LC Brühl
- Number: 21

Senior clubs
- Years: Team
- 2012: Asker SK
- 2012 - 2021: LC Brühl Handball
National team
Years	Team	Apps
2008 - 2021	Great Britain	51
- Updated on 1 November 2024

Kathryn Fudge (born 10 November 1989) is a British former handball player. She played for LC Brühl Handball the British national team, and competed at the 2012 Summer Olympics in London. She was born in Bury.

Kathryn used to play football as a child for Bury Girls and Ladies FC. She became the first British female handball player to score a goal at the 2012 Olympics.

She signed for SPL 1 team LC Brühl in August 2012. She later signed for LC Brühl, winning two titles with the club.
