= Therese Islas Helgesson =

Swedish handball player (born 1983)

Personal information
- Full name: Therese Sara Magdalena Islas Helgesson
- Nationality: Swedish
- Born: 22 June 1983 (age 43) Nacka, Sweden
- Height: 1.69 m (5 ft 7 in)

Sport
- Sport: Handball
- Position: Right Wing
- Current club: Retired

Youth career
- Years: Team
- 1990-2006: Skuru IK

Senior clubs
- Years: Team
- -2006: Skuru IK
- 2006-2008: Våg Vipers
- 2008-2009: Nordstrand IF
- 2009-2010: GOG Svendborg TGI
- 2010-2013: Toulon Métropole Var Handball
- 2014-2015: Skövde HF
National team
Years	Team	Apps	(Gls)
2002-2012	Sweden	107	(209)
Medal record
European Championship
Silver medal – second place	2010 Denmark/Norway	Team

Therese Sara Magdalena Islas Helgesson (born 22 June 1983) is a Swedish former handball player. She played for the Swedish national team, where she participated at the 2008 Summer Olympics in China, where the Swedish team placed eight, and the 2012 Summer Olympics, where Sweden came 11th.

She won the Swedish league twice in 2003/04 and 2004/05 with Skuru IK.
