= Lyn Byl =

British/German handball player (born 1979)

Personal information
- Full name: Lyn Byl
- Nationality: British / German
- Born: 1 December 1979 (age 46) Wuppertal, Germany
- Height: 1.72 m (5 ft 7 1/2 in)

Sport
- Sport: Handball
- Position: Right wing / left wing

Youth career
- Years: Team
- –: Sonnborner TV
- –: TuS Haßlinghausen

Senior clubs
- Years: Team
- -1997: TV Beyeröhde
- 1997-2003: Bayer 04 Leverkusen
- 2003-2004: SC Buntekuh
- 2004-2011: Bayer 04 Leverkusen
National team
Years	Team	Apps	(Gls)
–	Germany	5	(4)
2008-?	Great Britain		

Teams managed
- 2013-2016: 1.FC Köln

Lyn Byl (born 1 December 1979 in Wuppertal, Germany) is a British-German former handball player and coach. Born in Germany, she has an English mother and played for both the British national team and the German national team. She made her debut for Great Britain in 2008 and competed at the 2012 Summer Olympics. in London. She is a physiotherapist by profession. She coached the women's team of 1.FC Köln between 2013 and 2016.
