= Great Britain women's national handball team =

Great Britain

Information
- Association: British Handball Association
- Coach: Jesper Holmris

Colours
1st	2nd
- Last updated on Unknown.

The Great Britain women's national handball team is the national team of Great Britain in the sport of team handball. They were formed to take up Great Britain's host nation place in the 2012 Summer Olympics.

== Matches ==
Year	Date	Opposition	Score	Venue	Competition
2012	Jul 28	Montenegro	19–31	Copper Box, Stratford, London	Olympic Group A
2012	Jul 30	Russia	16–37	Copper Box, Stratford, London	Olympic Group A
2012	Aug 01	Brazil	17–30	Copper Box, Stratford, London	Olympic Group A
2012	Aug 03	Angola	25–31	Copper Box, Stratford, London	Olympic Group A
2012	Aug 05	Croatia	14–37	Copper Box, Stratford, London	Olympic Group A
2015	Nov 29	Faroe Islands	16-31	Torshavn, Faroe Islands	Friendly
2015	Nov 30	Faroe Islands	18–24	Torshavn, Faroe Islands	Friendly
2016	Nov 25	Belgium	31-36	Edinburgh, UK	Friendly
2016	Nov 26	Belgium	18-37	Edinburgh, UK	Friendly
2017	Mar 18	Belgium	24–33	Antwerp, Belgium	Friendly
2017	Mar 19	Belgium	30-30	Antwerp, Belgium	Friendly

- Source

== See also ==
- Great Britain men's national handball team
- Handball at the 2012 Summer Olympics

== The 2012 Olympic Squad ==
The following is the British roster in the women's handball tournament of the 2012 Summer Olympics.

Head coaches: Jesper Holmris, Vigdis Holmeset

No.	Pos.	Name	Date of birth (age)	Height	App.	Goals	Club
1	GK	Sarah Hargreaves	17 May 1989 (aged 23)	1.85 m	0	0	(Denmark) Slagelse FH
3	LW	Holly Lam-Moores	12 September 1990 (aged 21)	1.69 m	0	0	(United Kingdom) GB Handball
4	RW	Zoe van der Weel	14 November 1990 (aged 21)	1.61 m	0	0	(United Kingdom) GB Handball
5	CB	Nina Heglund	24 July 1993 (aged 19)	1.70 m	0	0	(United Kingdom) GB Handball
7	CB	Lynn McCafferty	16 April 1979 (aged 33)	1.68 m	0	0	(United Kingdom) GB Handball
8	P	Louise Jukes	14 April 1984 (aged 28)	1.69 m	0	0	(United Kingdom) GB Handball
9	LW	Britt Goodwin	24 April 1983 (aged 29)	1.63 m	0	0	(United Kingdom) GB Handball
10	RW	Kelsi Fairbrother	5 August 1989 (aged 22)	1.63 m	0	0	(Denmark) Team Esbjerg
11	P	Lyn Byl	1 December 1979 (aged 32)	1.72 m	0	0	(United Kingdom) GB Handball
13	RB	Yvonne Leuthold	30 January 1980 (aged 32)	1.76 m	0	0	(United Kingdom) GB Handball
17	LB	Ewa Palies	30 January 1989 (aged 23)	1.73 m	0	0	(United Kingdom) GB Handball
21	LB	Kathryn Fudge	10 November 1989 (aged 22)	1.83 m	0	0	(United Kingdom) GB Handball
66	GK	Jane Mayes	10 January 1989 (aged 23)	1.73 m	0	0	(United Kingdom) GB Handball
86	RB	Marie Gerbron	23 December 1986 (aged 25)	1.66 m	0	0	(United Kingdom) GB Handball
