= Kelsi Fairbrother =

British handball player (born 1989)

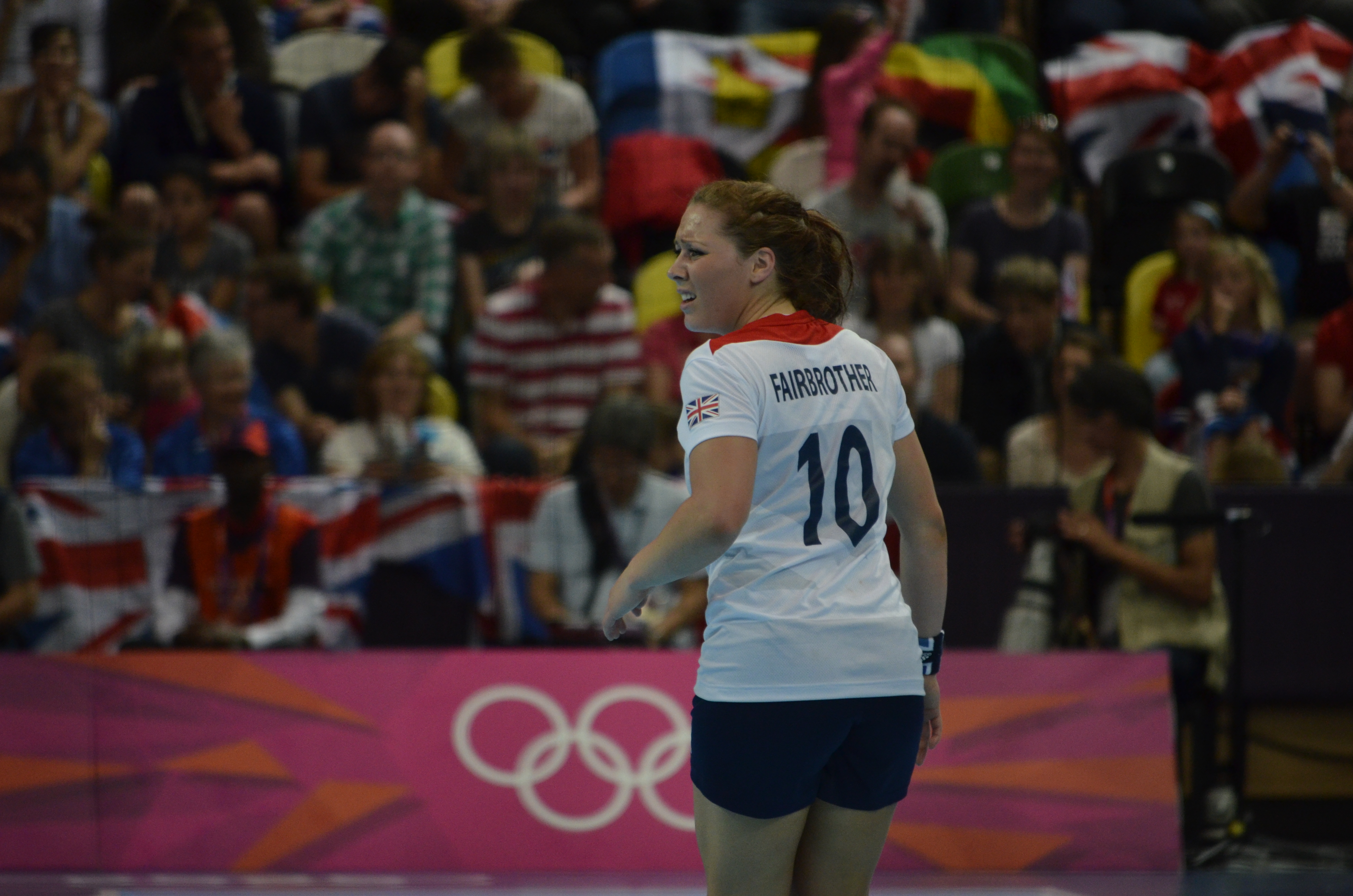
- Kelsi Fairbrother playing for the Great Britain team, at the 2012 Summer Olympics

Personal information
- Full name: Kelsi Melanie Fairbrother-Svane
- Nationality: British
- Born: 5 August 1989 (age 37) Hillingdon
- Height: 161 cm (63 in)

Sport
- Sport: Handball
- Position: Right wing

Senior clubs
- Years: Team
- 2010-2014: Team Esbjerg
- 2014-: Thuringer HC
National team
- Years: Team
- –: Great Britain

Kelsi Melanie Fairbrother-Svane (born 5 August 1989 in Hillingdon) is a British handball player. She plays for the British national team and competed at the 2012 Summer Olympics in London. She married Kris Svane on 18 July 2013 and now uses Kelsi Fairbrother-Svane as her married name. She played for the club Team Esbjerg until January 2014, when she announced her immediate move to Thuringer HC.
