= 2022 IHF Women's U20 Handball World Championship =

Tournament details
- Host country: Slovenia
- Venues: 3 (in 2 host cities)
- Dates: 22 June – 3 July
- Teams: 32 (from 5 confederations)

Final positions
- Champions: Norway (2nd title)
- Runners-up: Hungary
- Third place: Netherlands
- Fourth place: Sweden

Tournament statistics
- Matches played: 114
- Goals scored: 6,254 (54.86 per match)
- Top scorers: (Czech Republic) Charlotte Cholevová (Netherlands) Kim Molenaar (62 goals)

Awards
- Best player: (Netherlands) Kim Molenaar

The 2022 IHF Women's U20 Handball World Championship was the 23rd edition of the IHF Women's U20 Handball World Championship, held in Slovenia from 22 June to 3 July 2022 under the aegis of International Handball Federation (IHF). For the first time, the championship was organised by the Handball Federation of Slovenia. The number of teams increased from 24 to 32.

Norway won their second title after defeating Hungary in the final, while the Netherlands captured bronze after a win over Sweden.

== Bidding process ==
Two nations entered bid for hosting the tournament:

- North Macedonia
- Slovenia

North Macedonia later withdrew their bid. The tournament was awarded to Slovenia by the IHF Council in its meeting held in Cairo, Egypt on 28 February 2020.

== Qualification ==
Qualification	Dates	Host	Vacancies	Qualified
Host			1	Slovenia
2021 U-19 European Championship	8–18 July 2021	(Slovenia) Celje	11	Croatia; Czech Republic; Denmark; France; Germany; Hungary; Norway; Romania; ~~Russia~~; Switzerland; Slovakia; Sweden
European qualification	26–28 November 2021	(Montenegro) Podgorica	2	Poland; Montenegro
European qualification	4–6 March 2022	(Austria) Hollabrunn	2	Netherlands; Austria
2022 African Junior Championship	19–26 February 2022	(Guinea) Conakry	4	Angola; Egypt; Guinea; Tunisia
2022 Asian Junior Championship	7–14 March 2022	(Kazakhstan) Almaty	3	India; Iran; Kazakhstan
Additional Asian representatives	8 April 2022		2	South Korea; Japan
2022 South and Central American Junior Championship	22–26 March 2022	(Argentina) Buenos Aires	4	Argentina; Brazil; Chile; ~~Paraguay~~
2022 North America and Caribbean Junior Championship	4–8 April 2022	Mexico City	2	Mexico; United States
Wild Card			1	Italy

- Russia was excluded due to the 2022 Russian invasion of Ukraine.
- Paraguay withdrew before the tournament and was replaced with Lithuania.

== Venues ==
Matches were played in Celje and Laško.

- Golovec Hall
- Tri Lilije Hall
- Zlatorog Arena

== Draw ==
The draw was held on 13 April 2022 in Celje, Slovenia.

=== Seeding ===
Pot 1	Pot 2	Pot 3	Pot 4
Hungary; France; India; Sweden; Romania; Denmark; Croatia; Germany	Norway; Czech Republic; Argentina; Switzerland; Slovakia; Slovenia; Iran; Poland	Netherlands; Montenegro; Angola; Brazil; Kazakhstan; Chile; Egypt; Tunisia	South Korea; Japan; ~~Paraguay~~; Guinea; Mexico; United States; Austria; Italy

== Preliminary round ==
All times are local (UTC+2).

=== Group A ===
Pos	Team	Pld	W	D	L	GF	GA	GD	Pts	Qualification
1	Netherlands	3	2	1	0	105	74	+31	5	Main round
2	Japan	3	2	0	1	100	71	+29	4	Main round
3	Slovakia	3	1	1	1	103	68	+35	3	Presidents Cup
4	India	3	0	0	3	52	147	−95	0	Presidents Cup

Source: IHF
Rules for classification: 1) points; 2) head-to-head points; 3) head-to-head goal difference; 4) head-to-head number of goals scored; 5) goal difference.

22 June 2022; 14:30	Slovakia	17–29	Japan	Zlatorog Arena, Celje; Attendance: 150; Referees: Mikelić, Parađina (CRO)
22 June 2022; 14:30	Vargová 6	(11–12)	Ishikawa 6	Zlatorog Arena, Celje; Attendance: 150; Referees: Mikelić, Parađina (CRO)
22 June 2022; 14:30	1× (yellow card) 4× (suspension)	Report	1× (yellow card) 4× (suspension)	Zlatorog Arena, Celje; Attendance: 150; Referees: Mikelić, Parađina (CRO)

22 June 2022; 20:30	India	18–46	Netherlands	Tri Lilije Hall, Laško; Referees: Al-Mawt, Marhoon (BHR)
22 June 2022; 20:30	Bhawana 9	(10–23)	Steverink 9	Tri Lilije Hall, Laško; Referees: Al-Mawt, Marhoon (BHR)
22 June 2022; 20:30	3× (suspension)	Report	5× (suspension)	Tri Lilije Hall, Laško; Referees: Al-Mawt, Marhoon (BHR)

23 June 2022; 18:30	Slovakia	27–27	Netherlands	Zlatorog Arena, Celje; Attendance: 200; Referees: Sosa, Lemes (URU)
23 June 2022; 18:30	Ščípová 7	(13–14)	Molenaar 12	Zlatorog Arena, Celje; Attendance: 200; Referees: Sosa, Lemes (URU)
23 June 2022; 18:30	1× (yellow card) 7× (suspension)	Report	5× (suspension)	Zlatorog Arena, Celje; Attendance: 200; Referees: Sosa, Lemes (URU)

23 June 2022; 20:30	Japan	42–22	India	Zlatorog Arena, Celje; Attendance: 20; Referees: Conberse, Correa (ARG)
23 June 2022; 20:30	Kita 7	(17–12)	Bhawana 7	Zlatorog Arena, Celje; Attendance: 20; Referees: Conberse, Correa (ARG)
23 June 2022; 20:30	4× (suspension)	Report	1× (yellow card) 1× (suspension)	Zlatorog Arena, Celje; Attendance: 20; Referees: Conberse, Correa (ARG)

25 June 2022; 12:30	India	12–59	Slovakia	Zlatorog Arena, Celje; Attendance: 100; Referees: Al-Zayyat, Awwad (JOR)
25 June 2022; 12:30	Bhawana, Monika 5	(4–29)	Györiová 16	Zlatorog Arena, Celje; Attendance: 100; Referees: Al-Zayyat, Awwad (JOR)
25 June 2022; 12:30	2× (suspension)	Report	2× (suspension)	Zlatorog Arena, Celje; Attendance: 100; Referees: Al-Zayyat, Awwad (JOR)

25 June 2022; 20:30	Netherlands	32–29	Japan	Zlatorog Arena, Celje; Referees: Sekulić, Jovandić (SRB)
25 June 2022; 20:30	Molenaar 10	(16–16)	Ishikawa 7	Zlatorog Arena, Celje; Referees: Sekulić, Jovandić (SRB)
25 June 2022; 20:30	1× (yellow card) 4× (suspension)	Report	1× (yellow card) 5× (suspension)	Zlatorog Arena, Celje; Referees: Sekulić, Jovandić (SRB)

=== Group B ===
Pos	Team	Pld	W	D	L	GF	GA	GD	Pts	Qualification
1	Sweden	3	3	0	0	108	54	+54	6	Main round
2	Tunisia	3	2	0	1	89	80	+9	4	Main round
3	Iran	3	0	1	2	58	81	−23	1 (Note: Iran 19–19 Guinea)	Presidents Cup
4	Guinea	3	0	1	2	57	97	−40	1	Presidents Cup

Source: IHF
Rules for classification: 1) points; 2) head-to-head points; 3) head-to-head goal difference; 4) head-to-head number of goals scored; 5) goal difference.
Notes:

22 June 2022; 12:30	Iran	19–19	Guinea	Tri Lilije Hall, Laško; Referees: Balvan, Praštalo (BIH)
22 June 2022; 12:30	Merikhi 6	(7–9)	Sylla 5	Tri Lilije Hall, Laško; Referees: Balvan, Praštalo (BIH)
22 June 2022; 12:30	4× (suspension)	Report	1× (yellow card) 6× (suspension)	Tri Lilije Hall, Laško; Referees: Balvan, Praštalo (BIH)

22 June 2022; 16:30	Sweden	32–25	Tunisia	Zlatorog Arena, Celje; Attendance: 150; Referees: Covalciuc, Covalciuc (MDA)
22 June 2022; 16:30	Mumbongo 7	(15–12)	Jenzeri, Ouertani 5	Zlatorog Arena, Celje; Attendance: 150; Referees: Covalciuc, Covalciuc (MDA)
22 June 2022; 16:30	1× (yellow card) 3× (suspension)	Report	2× (suspension) 1× (red card)	Zlatorog Arena, Celje; Attendance: 150; Referees: Covalciuc, Covalciuc (MDA)

23 June 2022; 14:30	Iran	24–29	Tunisia	Zlatorog Arena, Celje; Attendance: 100; Referees: Lee, Lee (KOR)
23 June 2022; 14:30	Merikhi 9	(11–15)	Limem 10	Zlatorog Arena, Celje; Attendance: 100; Referees: Lee, Lee (KOR)
23 June 2022; 14:30	1× (yellow card) 4× (suspension)	Report	4× (suspension)	Zlatorog Arena, Celje; Attendance: 100; Referees: Lee, Lee (KOR)

23 June 2022; 16:30	Guinea	14–43	Sweden	Zlatorog Arena, Celje; Attendance: 100; Referees: Al-Zayyat, Awwad (JOR)
23 June 2022; 16:30	Diallo, Tolno 3	(7–17)	Östblom 7	Zlatorog Arena, Celje; Attendance: 100; Referees: Al-Zayyat, Awwad (JOR)
23 June 2022; 16:30	3× (suspension)	Report	4× (suspension)	Zlatorog Arena, Celje; Attendance: 100; Referees: Al-Zayyat, Awwad (JOR)

25 June 2022; 12:30	Tunisia	35–24	Guinea	Tri Lilije Hall, Laško; Attendance: 60; Referees: Sosa, Lemes (URU)
25 June 2022; 12:30	Limem 7	(17–10)	three players 4	Tri Lilije Hall, Laško; Attendance: 60; Referees: Sosa, Lemes (URU)
25 June 2022; 12:30	1× (yellow card) 3× (suspension)	Report	1× (yellow card) 4× (suspension)	Tri Lilije Hall, Laško; Attendance: 60; Referees: Sosa, Lemes (URU)

25 June 2022; 16:30	Sweden	33–15	Iran	Zlatorog Arena, Celje; Referees: Correa, Correa (BRA)
25 June 2022; 16:30	Bergsten 7	(15–7)	Zendehboudi 5	Zlatorog Arena, Celje; Referees: Correa, Correa (BRA)
25 June 2022; 16:30	2× (suspension)	Report	4× (suspension)	Zlatorog Arena, Celje; Referees: Correa, Correa (BRA)

=== Group C ===
Pos	Team	Pld	W	D	L	GF	GA	GD	Pts	Qualification
1	Denmark	3	3	0	0	88	68	+20	6	Main round
2	Montenegro	3	2	0	1	80	66	+14	4	Main round
3	Argentina	3	1	0	2	67	84	−17	2	Presidents Cup
4	Italy	3	0	0	3	68	85	−17	0	Presidents Cup

Source: IHF
Rules for classification: 1) points; 2) head-to-head points; 3) head-to-head goal difference; 4) head-to-head number of goals scored; 5) goal difference.

22 June 2022; 18:30	Denmark	24–20	Montenegro	Zlatorog Arena, Celje; Referees: El-Saied, El-Saied (EGY)
22 June 2022; 18:30	Wierzba 7	(12–11)	Gugač, Kadović 5	Zlatorog Arena, Celje; Referees: El-Saied, El-Saied (EGY)
22 June 2022; 18:30	3× (suspension)	Report	2× (yellow card) 4× (suspension)	Zlatorog Arena, Celje; Referees: El-Saied, El-Saied (EGY)

22 June 2022; 18:30	Argentina	25–20	Italy	Tri Lilije Hall, Laško; Referees: Mahmoud, El-Beltagy (EGY)
22 June 2022; 18:30	Frelier 6	(11–8)	Eghianruwa, Manojlovic 3	Tri Lilije Hall, Laško; Referees: Mahmoud, El-Beltagy (EGY)
22 June 2022; 18:30	8× (suspension)	Report	1× (yellow card) 3× (suspension) 1× (red card)	Tri Lilije Hall, Laško; Referees: Mahmoud, El-Beltagy (EGY)

23 June 2022; 14:30	Argentina	20–31	Montenegro	Golovec Hall, Celje; Attendance: 50; Referees: Braseth, Sundet (NOR)
23 June 2022; 14:30	Rivadeneira 5	(10–11)	Kadović 10	Golovec Hall, Celje; Attendance: 50; Referees: Braseth, Sundet (NOR)
23 June 2022; 14:30	2× (suspension)	Report	6× (suspension) 1× (red card)	Golovec Hall, Celje; Attendance: 50; Referees: Braseth, Sundet (NOR)

23 June 2022; 18:30	Italy	26–31	Denmark	Golovec Hall, Celje; Attendance: 50; Referees: Al-Mawt, Marhoon (BHR)
23 June 2022; 18:30	Fabbo 7	(16–19)	Wierzba 6	Golovec Hall, Celje; Attendance: 50; Referees: Al-Mawt, Marhoon (BHR)
23 June 2022; 18:30	2× (suspension)	Report	1× (yellow card) 3× (suspension)	Golovec Hall, Celje; Attendance: 50; Referees: Al-Mawt, Marhoon (BHR)

25 June 2022; 14:30	Montenegro	29–22	Italy	Tri Lilije Hall, Laško; Referees: Faraj, Taqi (KUW)
25 June 2022; 14:30	Kadović, A. Marsenić 6	(13–11)	Eghianruwa 8	Tri Lilije Hall, Laško; Referees: Faraj, Taqi (KUW)
25 June 2022; 14:30	3× (suspension)	Report	1× (yellow card) 1× (suspension) 1× (red card)	Tri Lilije Hall, Laško; Referees: Faraj, Taqi (KUW)

25 June 2022; 18:30	Denmark	33–22	Argentina	Zlatorog Arena, Celje; Referees: Bolic, Hurich (AUT)
25 June 2022; 18:30	three players 6	(19–12)	Ojea 5	Zlatorog Arena, Celje; Referees: Bolic, Hurich (AUT)
25 June 2022; 18:30	5× (suspension)	Report	1× (suspension)	Zlatorog Arena, Celje; Referees: Bolic, Hurich (AUT)

=== Group D ===
Pos	Team	Pld	W	D	L	GF	GA	GD	Pts	Qualification
1	France	3	2	1	0	105	73	+32	5 (Note: France 34–34 Norway)	Main round
2	Norway	3	2	1	0	92	80	+12	5	Main round
3	South Korea	3	1	0	2	71	82	−11	2	Presidents Cup
4	Brazil	3	0	0	3	64	97	−33	0	Presidents Cup

Source: IHF
Rules for classification: 1) points; 2) head-to-head points; 3) head-to-head goal difference; 4) head-to-head number of goals scored; 5) goal difference.
Notes:

22 June 2022; 15:30	Norway	26–22	South Korea	Golovec Hall, Celje; Attendance: 100; Referees: Sekulić, Jovandić (SRB)
22 June 2022; 15:30	F. Andersen 5	(13–11)	Lee W. 6	Golovec Hall, Celje; Attendance: 100; Referees: Sekulić, Jovandić (SRB)
22 June 2022; 15:30	1× (yellow card) 7× (suspension)	Report	5× (suspension)	Golovec Hall, Celje; Attendance: 100; Referees: Sekulić, Jovandić (SRB)

22 June 2022; 20:30	France	37–18	Brazil	Golovec Hall, Celje; Attendance: 50; Referees: Bolic, Hurich (AUT)
22 June 2022; 20:30	Tshimanga 7	(20–9)	Bastos 5	Golovec Hall, Celje; Attendance: 50; Referees: Bolic, Hurich (AUT)
22 June 2022; 20:30	1× (suspension)	Report	3× (suspension)	Golovec Hall, Celje; Attendance: 50; Referees: Bolic, Hurich (AUT)

23 June 2022; 16:30	Norway	32–24	Brazil	Golovec Hall, Celje; Attendance: 50; Referees: Covalciuc, Covalciuc (MDA)
23 June 2022; 16:30	Amundsen 5	(17–13)	Couto 9	Golovec Hall, Celje; Attendance: 50; Referees: Covalciuc, Covalciuc (MDA)
23 June 2022; 16:30		Report	3× (suspension)	Golovec Hall, Celje; Attendance: 50; Referees: Covalciuc, Covalciuc (MDA)

23 June 2022; 20:30	South Korea	21–34	France	Golovec Hall, Celje; Attendance: 50; Referees: Konjičanin, Konjičanin (BIH)
23 June 2022; 20:30	Lee Y. 6	(7–18)	Bouktit 7	Golovec Hall, Celje; Attendance: 50; Referees: Konjičanin, Konjičanin (BIH)
23 June 2022; 20:30	2× (suspension) 1× (red card)	Report	1× (suspension)	Golovec Hall, Celje; Attendance: 50; Referees: Konjičanin, Konjičanin (BIH)

25 June 2022; 12:30	Brazil	22–28	South Korea	Golovec Hall, Celje; Attendance: 50; Referees: Hannes, Hannes (GER)
25 June 2022; 12:30	Ferreira 5	(10–13)	Choi, Ji 6	Golovec Hall, Celje; Attendance: 50; Referees: Hannes, Hannes (GER)
25 June 2022; 12:30	3× (suspension)	Report	3× (suspension)	Golovec Hall, Celje; Attendance: 50; Referees: Hannes, Hannes (GER)

25 June 2022; 14:30	France	34–34	Norway	Golovec Hall, Celje; Attendance: 70; Referees: El-Saied, El-Saied (EGY)
25 June 2022; 14:30	Grandveau, Tshimanga 8	(15–20)	Sæteren 6	Golovec Hall, Celje; Attendance: 70; Referees: El-Saied, El-Saied (EGY)
25 June 2022; 14:30	3× (suspension)	Report	4× (suspension) 1× (red card)	Golovec Hall, Celje; Attendance: 70; Referees: El-Saied, El-Saied (EGY)

=== Group E ===
Pos	Team	Pld	W	D	L	GF	GA	GD	Pts	Qualification
1	Angola	3	2	0	1	90	69	+21	4 (Note: Angola 2 Pts, +8 GD; Czech Republic 2 Pts, −4 GD, 57 GS; Romania 2 Pts, −4 GD, 51 GS)	Main round
2	Czech Republic	3	2	0	1	90	77	+13	4	Main round
3	Romania	3	2	0	1	80	75	+5	4	Presidents Cup
4	Lithuania (Note: Lithuania replaced Paraguay who withdrew.)	3	0	0	3	54	93	−39	0	Presidents Cup

Source: IHF
Rules for classification: 1) points; 2) head-to-head points; 3) head-to-head goal difference; 4) head-to-head number of goals scored; 5) goal difference.
Notes:

22 June 2022; 12:30	Romania	26–23	Angola	Zlatorog Arena, Celje; Referees: Paolantoni, García (ARG)
22 June 2022; 12:30	Mihai 6	(12–10)	Mario 6	Zlatorog Arena, Celje; Referees: Paolantoni, García (ARG)
22 June 2022; 12:30	2× (yellow card) 3× (suspension)	Report	2× (yellow card) 5× (suspension)	Zlatorog Arena, Celje; Referees: Paolantoni, García (ARG)

22 June 2022; 13:30	Czech Republic	33–16	Lithuania	Golovec Hall, Celje; Referees: Braseth, Sundet (NOR)
22 June 2022; 13:30	Cholevová 9	(19–7)	Andronik, Pilikauskaitė 4	Golovec Hall, Celje; Referees: Braseth, Sundet (NOR)
22 June 2022; 13:30	1× (yellow card) 7× (suspension) 1× (red card)	Report	2× (suspension)	Golovec Hall, Celje; Referees: Braseth, Sundet (NOR)

24 June 2022; 12:30	Czech Republic	25–36	Angola	Golovec Hall, Celje; Attendance: 50; Referees: Sekulić, Jovandić (SRB)
24 June 2022; 12:30	Cholevová 10	(13–16)	Mario 7	Golovec Hall, Celje; Attendance: 50; Referees: Sekulić, Jovandić (SRB)
24 June 2022; 12:30	2× (suspension)	Report	8× (suspension)	Golovec Hall, Celje; Attendance: 50; Referees: Sekulić, Jovandić (SRB)

24 June 2022; 14:30	Lithuania	20–29	Romania	Golovec Hall, Celje; Attendance: 60; Referees: Mikelić, Parađina (CRO)
24 June 2022; 14:30	Pilikauskaitė 5	(11–10)	Necula 5	Golovec Hall, Celje; Attendance: 60; Referees: Mikelić, Parađina (CRO)
24 June 2022; 14:30	2× (suspension)	Report	1× (yellow card) 2× (suspension)	Golovec Hall, Celje; Attendance: 60; Referees: Mikelić, Parađina (CRO)

25 June 2022; 10:30	Angola	31–18	Lithuania	Golovec Hall, Celje; Attendance: 40; Referees: Conberse, Correa (ARG)
25 June 2022; 10:30	Marcos 6	(14–9)	Voskresenskaja 7	Golovec Hall, Celje; Attendance: 40; Referees: Conberse, Correa (ARG)
25 June 2022; 10:30	7× (suspension) 1× (red card)	Report	1× (suspension)	Golovec Hall, Celje; Attendance: 40; Referees: Conberse, Correa (ARG)

25 June 2022; 16:30	Romania	25–32	Czech Republic	Golovec Hall, Celje; Attendance: 100; Referees: Gasmi, Gasmi (FRA)
25 June 2022; 16:30	Țîrle 5	(14–14)	Cholevová 8	Golovec Hall, Celje; Attendance: 100; Referees: Gasmi, Gasmi (FRA)
25 June 2022; 16:30	2× (suspension)	Report	2× (suspension)	Golovec Hall, Celje; Attendance: 100; Referees: Gasmi, Gasmi (FRA)

=== Group F ===
Pos	Team	Pld	W	D	L	GF	GA	GD	Pts	Qualification
1	Germany	3	3	0	0	109	53	+56	6	Main round
2	Slovenia (H)	3	2	0	1	87	58	+29	4	Main round
3	Chile	3	1	0	2	62	97	−35	2	Presidents Cup
4	Mexico	3	0	0	3	60	110	−50	0	Presidents Cup

Source: IHF
Rules for classification: 1) points; 2) head-to-head points; 3) head-to-head goal difference; 4) head-to-head number of goals scored; 5) goal difference.
(H) Hosts

22 June 2022; 11:30	Germany	40–18	Chile	Golovec Hall, Celje; Referees: Faraj, Taqi (KUW)
22 June 2022; 11:30	Jörgens 10	(22–9)	three players 3	Golovec Hall, Celje; Referees: Faraj, Taqi (KUW)
22 June 2022; 11:30	1× (yellow card) 7× (suspension)	Report		Golovec Hall, Celje; Referees: Faraj, Taqi (KUW)

22 June 2022; 18:30	Slovenia	37–18	Mexico	Golovec Hall, Celje; Attendance: 400; Referees: Gasmi, Gasmi (FRA)
22 June 2022; 18:30	Novak 10	(23–8)	Verdugo 5	Golovec Hall, Celje; Attendance: 400; Referees: Gasmi, Gasmi (FRA)
22 June 2022; 18:30	1× (suspension)	Report	5× (suspension)	Golovec Hall, Celje; Attendance: 400; Referees: Gasmi, Gasmi (FRA)

24 June 2022; 16:30	Mexico	14–42	Germany	Golovec Hall, Celje; Attendance: 55; Referees: Lee, Lee (KOR)
24 June 2022; 16:30	Govea 8	(7–22)	Tietjen, Ziercke 7	Golovec Hall, Celje; Attendance: 55; Referees: Lee, Lee (KOR)
24 June 2022; 16:30	3× (suspension)	Report	3× (suspension)	Golovec Hall, Celje; Attendance: 55; Referees: Lee, Lee (KOR)

24 June 2022; 18:30	Slovenia	29–13	Chile	Golovec Hall, Celje; Attendance: 300; Referees: Mahmoud, El-Beltagy (EGY)
24 June 2022; 18:30	Novak 6	(15–7)	Carrasco 3	Golovec Hall, Celje; Attendance: 300; Referees: Mahmoud, El-Beltagy (EGY)
24 June 2022; 18:30	2× (yellow card) 4× (suspension)	Report	2× (suspension)	Golovec Hall, Celje; Attendance: 300; Referees: Mahmoud, El-Beltagy (EGY)

25 June 2022; 18:30	Germany	27–21	Slovenia	Golovec Hall, Celje; Attendance: 400; Referees: Paolantoni, García (ARG)
25 June 2022; 18:30	Engel 7	(14–10)	Barukčić 5	Golovec Hall, Celje; Attendance: 400; Referees: Paolantoni, García (ARG)
25 June 2022; 18:30	5× (suspension)	Report	2× (yellow card) 5× (suspension)	Golovec Hall, Celje; Attendance: 400; Referees: Paolantoni, García (ARG)

25 June 2022; 20:30	Chile	31–28	Mexico	Golovec Hall, Celje; Attendance: 20; Referees: Al-Mawt, Marhoon (BHR)
25 June 2022; 20:30	De La Barra 9	(17–13)	Verdugo 10	Golovec Hall, Celje; Attendance: 20; Referees: Al-Mawt, Marhoon (BHR)
25 June 2022; 20:30	1× (yellow card) 1× (suspension)	Report	1× (yellow card) 3× (suspension)	Golovec Hall, Celje; Attendance: 20; Referees: Al-Mawt, Marhoon (BHR)

=== Group G ===
Pos	Team	Pld	W	D	L	GF	GA	GD	Pts	Qualification
1	Croatia	3	2	0	1	97	63	+34	4 (Note: Croatia 2 Pts, +13 GD, Switzerland 2 Pts, −6 GD; Austria 2 Pts, −7 GD)	Main round
2	Switzerland	3	2	0	1	91	75	+16	4	Main round
3	Austria	3	2	0	1	98	84	+14	4	Presidents Cup
4	Kazakhstan	3	0	0	3	54	118	−64	0	Presidents Cup

Source: IHF
Rules for classification: 1) points; 2) head-to-head points; 3) head-to-head goal difference; 4) head-to-head number of goals scored; 5) goal difference.
Notes:

22 June 2022; 14:30	Croatia	36–15	Kazakhstan	Tri Lilije Hall, Laško; Referees: Budzák, Záhradník (SVK)
22 June 2022; 14:30	Brkić, Zrnić 6	(18–6)	Sabyrzhankyzy, Zvyagina 6	Tri Lilije Hall, Laško; Referees: Budzák, Záhradník (SVK)
22 June 2022; 14:30	2× (suspension)	Report	1× (yellow card) 2× (suspension)	Tri Lilije Hall, Laško; Referees: Budzák, Záhradník (SVK)

22 June 2022; 16:30	Switzerland	26–33	Austria	Tri Lilije Hall, Laško; Referees: Konjičanin, Konjičanin (BIH)
22 June 2022; 16:30	Albrecht 6	(10–18)	Dramac 14	Tri Lilije Hall, Laško; Referees: Konjičanin, Konjičanin (BIH)
22 June 2022; 16:30	3× (suspension)	Report	4× (suspension)	Tri Lilije Hall, Laško; Referees: Konjičanin, Konjičanin (BIH)

24 June 2022; 18:30	Austria	26–40	Croatia	Zlatorog Arena, Celje; Referees: Gasmi, Gasmi (FRA)
24 June 2022; 18:30	Dramac 12	(9–20)	Zrnić 8	Zlatorog Arena, Celje; Referees: Gasmi, Gasmi (FRA)
24 June 2022; 18:30	3× (suspension)	Report	2× (yellow card) 3× (suspension)	Zlatorog Arena, Celje; Referees: Gasmi, Gasmi (FRA)

24 June 2022; 20:30	Switzerland	43–21	Kazakhstan	Zlatorog Arena, Celje; Referees: Correa, Correa (BRA)
24 June 2022; 20:30	Albrecht 9	(19–12)	Zvyagina 7	Zlatorog Arena, Celje; Referees: Correa, Correa (BRA)
24 June 2022; 20:30	1× (suspension)	Report	2× (suspension)	Zlatorog Arena, Celje; Referees: Correa, Correa (BRA)

25 June 2022; 16:30	Kazakhstan	18–39	Austria	Tri Lilije Hall, Laško; Attendance: 100; Referees: Braseth, Sundet (NOR)
25 June 2022; 16:30	Zvyagina 8	(10–17)	Spalt 8	Tri Lilije Hall, Laško; Attendance: 100; Referees: Braseth, Sundet (NOR)
25 June 2022; 16:30	1× (suspension)	Report	2× (suspension)	Tri Lilije Hall, Laško; Attendance: 100; Referees: Braseth, Sundet (NOR)

25 June 2022; 18:30	Croatia	21–22	Switzerland	Tri Lilije Hall, Laško; Referees: Covalciuc, Covalciuc (MDA)
25 June 2022; 18:30	Zrnić 6	(11–12)	Litscher 6	Tri Lilije Hall, Laško; Referees: Covalciuc, Covalciuc (MDA)
25 June 2022; 18:30	3× (suspension)	Report	1× (yellow card) 2× (suspension)	Tri Lilije Hall, Laško; Referees: Covalciuc, Covalciuc (MDA)

=== Group H ===
Pos	Team	Pld	W	D	L	GF	GA	GD	Pts	Qualification
1	Hungary	3	3	0	0	115	41	+74	6	Main round
2	Egypt	3	2	0	1	81	75	+6	4	Main round
3	Poland	3	1	0	2	78	71	+7	2	Presidents Cup
4	United States	3	0	0	3	30	117	−87	0	Presidents Cup

Source: IHF
Rules for classification: 1) points; 2) head-to-head points; 3) head-to-head goal difference; 4) head-to-head number of goals scored; 5) goal difference.

22 June 2022; 10:30	Poland	37–14	United States	Zlatorog Arena, Celje; Attendance: 100; Referees: Al-Zayyat, Awwad (JOR)
22 June 2022; 10:30	Niewiadomska 9	(18–9)	Nesper 5	Zlatorog Arena, Celje; Attendance: 100; Referees: Al-Zayyat, Awwad (JOR)
22 June 2022; 10:30	2× (yellow card) 7× (suspension)	Report	2× (yellow card) 2× (suspension)	Zlatorog Arena, Celje; Attendance: 100; Referees: Al-Zayyat, Awwad (JOR)

22 June 2022; 20:30	Hungary	39–20	Egypt	Zlatorog Arena, Celje; Referees: Correa, Correa (BRA)
22 June 2022; 20:30	Vámos 9	(18–10)	M. Ibrahim, N. Ibrahim 5	Zlatorog Arena, Celje; Referees: Correa, Correa (BRA)
22 June 2022; 20:30	1× (yellow card) 5× (suspension)	Report	3× (suspension)	Zlatorog Arena, Celje; Referees: Correa, Correa (BRA)

24 June 2022; 14:30	Poland	25–27	Egypt	Zlatorog Arena, Celje; Attendance: 100; Referees: Budzák, Záhradník (SVK)
24 June 2022; 14:30	Jureńczyk 6	(14–14)	Seoudy 7	Zlatorog Arena, Celje; Attendance: 100; Referees: Budzák, Záhradník (SVK)
24 June 2022; 14:30	5× (suspension)	Report	3× (suspension)	Zlatorog Arena, Celje; Attendance: 100; Referees: Budzák, Záhradník (SVK)

24 June 2022; 16:30	United States	5–46	Hungary	Zlatorog Arena, Celje; Attendance: 50; Referees: Faraj, Taqi (KUW)
24 June 2022; 16:30	Monroy 2	(2–23)	Mlinkó 10	Zlatorog Arena, Celje; Attendance: 50; Referees: Faraj, Taqi (KUW)
24 June 2022; 16:30	3× (suspension)	Report	1× (yellow card) 3× (suspension)	Zlatorog Arena, Celje; Attendance: 50; Referees: Faraj, Taqi (KUW)

25 June 2022; 14:30	Hungary	30–16	Poland	Zlatorog Arena, Celje; Referees: Konjičanin, Konjičanin (BIH)
25 June 2022; 14:30	Farkas 7	(14–11)	Kopańska, Szczukocka 3	Zlatorog Arena, Celje; Referees: Konjičanin, Konjičanin (BIH)
25 June 2022; 14:30	6× (suspension) 1× (red card)	Report	2× (suspension)	Zlatorog Arena, Celje; Referees: Konjičanin, Konjičanin (BIH)

25 June 2022; 20:30	Egypt	34–11	United States	Tri Lilije Hall, Laško; Attendance: 120; Referees: Balvan, Praštalo (BIH)
25 June 2022; 20:30	Ibrahim 6	(18–6)	Nesper 7	Tri Lilije Hall, Laško; Attendance: 120; Referees: Balvan, Praštalo (BIH)
25 June 2022; 20:30	3× (suspension)	Report	1× (yellow card) 3× (suspension)	Tri Lilije Hall, Laško; Attendance: 120; Referees: Balvan, Praštalo (BIH)

== Presidents Cup ==
Points obtained in the matches between the same teams from the preliminary round were carried over.

=== Group I ===
Pos	Team	Pld	W	D	L	GF	GA	GD	Pts	Qualification
1	Slovakia	3	3	0	0	127	57	+70	6	17–20th place semifinals
2	Guinea	3	1	1	1	82	87	−5	3	21st–24th place semifinals
3	India	3	1	0	2	80	129	−49	2	25–28th place semifinals
4	Iran	3	0	1	2	71	87	−16	1	29th–32nd place semifinals

Source: IHF
Rules for classification: 1) points; 2) head-to-head points; 3) head-to-head goal difference; 4) head-to-head number of goals scored; 5) goal difference.

26 June 2022; 14:30	Slovakia	31–23	Guinea	Golovec Hall, Celje; Attendance: 40; Referees: Conberse, Correa (ARG)
26 June 2022; 14:30	Györiová 6	(13–8)	Tolno 9	Golovec Hall, Celje; Attendance: 40; Referees: Conberse, Correa (ARG)
26 June 2022; 14:30	2× (yellow card) 1× (suspension)	Report	1× (yellow card) 3× (suspension)	Golovec Hall, Celje; Attendance: 40; Referees: Conberse, Correa (ARG)

26 June 2022; 16:30	Iran	30–31	India	Golovec Hall, Celje; Attendance: 50; Referees: Hannes, Hannes (GER)
26 June 2022; 16:30	Merikhi 11	(16–14)	Bhawana 10	Golovec Hall, Celje; Attendance: 50; Referees: Hannes, Hannes (GER)
26 June 2022; 16:30	1× (yellow card) 3× (suspension)	Report	1× (yellow card) 3× (suspension)	Golovec Hall, Celje; Attendance: 50; Referees: Hannes, Hannes (GER)

28 June 2022; 12:30	Slovakia	37–22	Iran	Zlatorog Arena, Celje; Attendance: 70; Referees: Lee, Lee (KOR)
28 June 2022; 12:30	Pénzes 11	(20–7)	Baratpour 5	Zlatorog Arena, Celje; Attendance: 70; Referees: Lee, Lee (KOR)
28 June 2022; 12:30		Report	2× (suspension)	Zlatorog Arena, Celje; Attendance: 70; Referees: Lee, Lee (KOR)

28 June 2022; 20:30	India	37–40	Guinea	Tri Lilije Hall, Laško; Attendance: 60; Referees: Faraj, Taqi (KUW)
28 June 2022; 20:30	Jassi 10	(18–18)	Tolno 11	Tri Lilije Hall, Laško; Attendance: 60; Referees: Faraj, Taqi (KUW)
28 June 2022; 20:30	5× (suspension)	Report	7× (suspension)	Tri Lilije Hall, Laško; Attendance: 60; Referees: Faraj, Taqi (KUW)

=== Group II ===
Pos	Team	Pld	W	D	L	GF	GA	GD	Pts	Qualification
1	South Korea	3	3	0	0	101	73	+28	6	17–20th place semifinals
2	Brazil	3	2	0	1	72	75	−3	4	21st–24th place semifinals
3	Argentina	3	1	0	2	74	85	−11	2	25–28th place semifinals
4	Italy	3	0	0	3	69	83	−14	0	29th–32nd place semifinals

Source: IHF
Rules for classification: 1) points; 2) head-to-head points; 3) head-to-head goal difference; 4) head-to-head number of goals scored; 5) goal difference.

26 June 2022; 14:30	Argentina	26–27	Brazil	Zlatorog Arena, Celje; Attendance: 100; Referees: El-Saied, El-Saied (EGY)
26 June 2022; 14:30	Frelier 12	(17–14)	Da Silva 6	Zlatorog Arena, Celje; Attendance: 100; Referees: El-Saied, El-Saied (EGY)
26 June 2022; 14:30	1× (yellow card)	Report	1× (yellow card) 4× (suspension)	Zlatorog Arena, Celje; Attendance: 100; Referees: El-Saied, El-Saied (EGY)

26 June 2022; 16:30	South Korea	35–28	Italy	Zlatorog Arena, Celje; Attendance: 100; Referees: Al-Zayyat, Awwad (JOR)
26 June 2022; 16:30	Lee Y. 11	(16–17)	Fabbo 8	Zlatorog Arena, Celje; Attendance: 100; Referees: Al-Zayyat, Awwad (JOR)
26 June 2022; 16:30	1× (yellow card) 4× (suspension)	Report	2× (suspension)	Zlatorog Arena, Celje; Attendance: 100; Referees: Al-Zayyat, Awwad (JOR)

28 June 2022; 12:30	Italy	21–23	Brazil	Golovec Hall, Celje; Attendance: 30; Referees: Al-Mawt, Marhoon (BHR)
28 June 2022; 12:30	Podda 6	(13–10)	Ferreira 10	Golovec Hall, Celje; Attendance: 30; Referees: Al-Mawt, Marhoon (BHR)
28 June 2022; 12:30	2× (suspension) 1× (red card)	Report	4× (suspension) 1× (red card)	Golovec Hall, Celje; Attendance: 30; Referees: Al-Mawt, Marhoon (BHR)

28 June 2022; 18:30	Argentina	23–38	South Korea	Tri Lilije Hall, Laško; Attendance: 50; Referees: Mikelić, Parađina (CRO)
28 June 2022; 18:30	García 5	(11–18)	Lee Y. 10	Tri Lilije Hall, Laško; Attendance: 50; Referees: Mikelić, Parađina (CRO)
28 June 2022; 18:30	1× (yellow card) 2× (suspension) 1× (red card)	Report	3× (suspension)	Tri Lilije Hall, Laško; Attendance: 50; Referees: Mikelić, Parađina (CRO)

=== Group III ===
Pos	Team	Pld	W	D	L	GF	GA	GD	Pts	Qualification
1	Romania	3	3	0	0	110	55	+55	6	17–20th place semifinals
2	Lithuania	3	2	0	1	91	66	+25	4	21st–24th place semifinals
3	Chile	3	1	0	2	63	103	−40	2	25–28th place semifinals
4	Mexico	3	0	0	3	68	108	−40	0	29th–32nd place semifinals

Source: IHF
Rules for classification: 1) points; 2) head-to-head points; 3) head-to-head goal difference; 4) head-to-head number of goals scored; 5) goal difference.

27 June 2022; 14:30	Romania	39–18	Mexico	Zlatorog Arena, Celje; Attendance: 50; Referees: Mahmoud, El-Beltagy (EGY)
27 June 2022; 14:30	Dumitrascu 9	(21–10)	Verdugo 7	Zlatorog Arena, Celje; Attendance: 50; Referees: Mahmoud, El-Beltagy (EGY)
27 June 2022; 14:30	2× (yellow card) 1× (suspension)	Report	3× (suspension) 1× (red card)	Zlatorog Arena, Celje; Attendance: 50; Referees: Mahmoud, El-Beltagy (EGY)

27 June 2022; 16:30	Chile	15–33	Lithuania	Zlatorog Arena, Celje; Referees: Balvan, Praštalo (BIH)
27 June 2022; 16:30	three players 3	(8–14)	Damulevičiūtė, Mackonytė 5	Zlatorog Arena, Celje; Referees: Balvan, Praštalo (BIH)
27 June 2022; 16:30	3× (suspension)	Report	1× (yellow card) 1× (suspension)	Zlatorog Arena, Celje; Referees: Balvan, Praštalo (BIH)

28 June 2022; 14:30	Romania	42–27	Chile	Tri Lilije Hall, Laško; Attendance: 50; Referees: Conberse, Correa (ARG)
28 June 2022; 14:30	Dumitrascu 10	(21–9)	Galvez 7	Tri Lilije Hall, Laško; Attendance: 50; Referees: Conberse, Correa (ARG)
28 June 2022; 14:30	1× (suspension)	Report	1× (suspension)	Tri Lilije Hall, Laško; Attendance: 50; Referees: Conberse, Correa (ARG)

28 June 2022; 16:30	Lithuania	38–22	Mexico	Tri Lilije Hall, Laško; Attendance: 50; Referees: Correa, Correa (BRA)
28 June 2022; 16:30	Andronik, Gudlinkytė 6	(24–10)	Verdugo 8	Tri Lilije Hall, Laško; Attendance: 50; Referees: Correa, Correa (BRA)
28 June 2022; 16:30		Report	4× (suspension)	Tri Lilije Hall, Laško; Attendance: 50; Referees: Correa, Correa (BRA)

=== Group IV ===
Pos	Team	Pld	W	D	L	GF	GA	GD	Pts	Qualification
1	Poland	3	3	0	0	112	68	+44	6	17–20th place semifinals
2	Austria	3	2	0	1	100	61	+39	4	21st–24th place semifinals
3	Kazakhstan	3	1	0	2	77	107	−30	2	25–28th place semifinals
4	United States	3	0	0	3	50	103	−53	0	29th–32nd place semifinals

Source: IHF
Rules for classification: 1) points; 2) head-to-head points; 3) head-to-head goal difference; 4) head-to-head number of goals scored; 5) goal difference.

27 June 2022; 14:30	Poland	38–27	Kazakhstan	Golovec Hall, Celje; Attendance: 40; Referees: Mikelić, Parađina (CRO)
27 June 2022; 14:30	Niewiadomska 9	(17–14)	Seitkassim 10	Golovec Hall, Celje; Attendance: 40; Referees: Mikelić, Parađina (CRO)
27 June 2022; 14:30	1× (yellow card) 4× (suspension)	Report	2× (suspension)	Golovec Hall, Celje; Attendance: 40; Referees: Mikelić, Parađina (CRO)

27 June 2022; 16:30	Austria	34–6	United States	Golovec Hall, Celje; Attendance: 50; Referees: Budzák, Záhradník (SVK)
27 June 2022; 16:30	Dramac 11	(20–6)	Nesper, Rienhardt 2	Golovec Hall, Celje; Attendance: 50; Referees: Budzák, Záhradník (SVK)
27 June 2022; 16:30	1× (suspension)	Report	1× (suspension)	Golovec Hall, Celje; Attendance: 50; Referees: Budzák, Záhradník (SVK)

28 June 2022; 10:30	Austria	27–37	Poland	Golovec Hall, Celje; Attendance: 30; Referees: Balvan, Praštalo (BIH)
28 June 2022; 10:30	Dramac 8	(16–19)	Grobelna, Pastuszka 6	Golovec Hall, Celje; Attendance: 30; Referees: Balvan, Praštalo (BIH)
28 June 2022; 10:30	3× (yellow card) 3× (suspension)	Report	1× (yellow card) 1× (suspension)	Golovec Hall, Celje; Attendance: 30; Referees: Balvan, Praštalo (BIH)

28 June 2022; 12:30	Kazakhstan	32–30	United States	Tri Lilije Hall, Laško; Attendance: 20; Referees: Mahmoud, El-Beltagy (EGY)
28 June 2022; 12:30	Pupchenkova, Seitkassym 8	(20–7)	Licea 7	Tri Lilije Hall, Laško; Attendance: 20; Referees: Mahmoud, El-Beltagy (EGY)
28 June 2022; 12:30	4× (suspension)	Report	1× (yellow card) 6× (suspension)	Tri Lilije Hall, Laško; Attendance: 20; Referees: Mahmoud, El-Beltagy (EGY)

=== Placement matches ===
==== Bracket ====
17th place bracket

17–20th place semifinals
30 June
Slovakia	30
Romania	31
30 June
South Korea	26
Poland	28

17th place game
1 July
Romania	22
Poland	23
19th place game
1 July
Slovakia	31
South Korea	36

21st place bracket

21st–24th place semifinals
30 June
Guinea	27
Lithuania	41
30 June
Brazil	10
Austria	0

21st place game
1 July
Lithuania	27
Brazil	26
23rd place game
1 July
Guinea	10
Austria	0

25th place bracket

25–28th place semifinals
30 June
India	32
Chile	29
30 June
Argentina	43
Kazakhstan	20

25th place game
1 July
India	30
Argentina	41
27th place game
1 July
Chile	25
Kazakhstan	24

29th place bracket

29–32nd place semifinals
30 June
Iran	46
Mexico	26
30 June
Italy	36
United States	17

29th place game
1 July
Iran	20
Italy	35
31st place game
1 July
Mexico	26
United States	28

==== 29th–32nd place semifinals ====
30 June 2022; 10:00	Iran	46–26	Mexico	Golovec Hall, Celje; Attendance: 60; Referees: Sekulić, Jovandić (SRB)
30 June 2022; 10:00	Karimi 14	(18–11)	Ibarra, Sánchez 5	Golovec Hall, Celje; Attendance: 60; Referees: Sekulić, Jovandić (SRB)
30 June 2022; 10:00	3× (suspension)	Report	5× (suspension)	Golovec Hall, Celje; Attendance: 60; Referees: Sekulić, Jovandić (SRB)

30 June 2022; 12:00	Italy	36–17	United States	Golovec Hall, Celje; Attendance: 60; Referees: Conberse, Correa (ARG)
30 June 2022; 12:00	Meneghini 7	(15–8)	Nesper 7	Golovec Hall, Celje; Attendance: 60; Referees: Conberse, Correa (ARG)
30 June 2022; 12:00	2× (suspension)	Report	1× (yellow card) 2× (suspension)	Golovec Hall, Celje; Attendance: 60; Referees: Conberse, Correa (ARG)

==== 25–28th place semifinals ====
30 June 2022; 16:30	India	32–29	Chile	Tri Lilije Hall, Laško; Referees: Al-Mawt, Marhoon (BHR)
30 June 2022; 16:30	Bhawana 8	(18–14)	four players 5	Tri Lilije Hall, Laško; Referees: Al-Mawt, Marhoon (BHR)
30 June 2022; 16:30	3× (suspension)	Report	2× (yellow card) 3× (suspension)	Tri Lilije Hall, Laško; Referees: Al-Mawt, Marhoon (BHR)

30 June 2022; 18:30	Argentina	43–20	Kazakhstan	Tri Lilije Hall, Laško; Attendance: 20; Referees: Al-Zayyat, Awwad (JOR)
30 June 2022; 18:30	Corvalan 7	(21–10)	Seitkassym 6	Tri Lilije Hall, Laško; Attendance: 20; Referees: Al-Zayyat, Awwad (JOR)
30 June 2022; 18:30	1× (yellow card) 2× (suspension)	Report	1× (suspension)	Tri Lilije Hall, Laško; Attendance: 20; Referees: Al-Zayyat, Awwad (JOR)

==== 21st–24th place semifinals ====
30 June 2022; 14:30	Guinea	27–41	Lithuania	Tri Lilije Hall, Laško; Attendance: 50; Referees: Konjičanin, Konjičanin (BIH)
30 June 2022; 14:30	Kourouma, Kadiatou 8	(12–20)	Pilikauskaitė 10	Tri Lilije Hall, Laško; Attendance: 50; Referees: Konjičanin, Konjičanin (BIH)
30 June 2022; 14:30	4× (suspension)	Report	2× (suspension)	Tri Lilije Hall, Laško; Attendance: 50; Referees: Konjičanin, Konjičanin (BIH)

Cancelled	Brazil	10–0 (Note: Austria withdrew from the tournament due to several positive COVID-19 cases. The matches were counted as a 10–0 win for the opposing team.)	Austria

==== 17–20th place semifinals ====
30 June 2022; 12:00	Slovakia	30–31	Romania	Zlatorog Arena, Celje; Attendance: 25; Referees: Mikelić, Parađina (CRO)
30 June 2022; 12:00	Vargová 6	(15–17)	Bichir 7	Zlatorog Arena, Celje; Attendance: 25; Referees: Mikelić, Parađina (CRO)
30 June 2022; 12:00	1× (yellow card) 2× (suspension)	Report	4× (suspension)	Zlatorog Arena, Celje; Attendance: 25; Referees: Mikelić, Parađina (CRO)

30 June 2022; 12:30	South Korea	26–28	Poland	Tri Lilije Hall, Laško; Attendance: 50; Referees: Mahmoud, El-Beltagy (EGY)
30 June 2022; 12:30	Ji 8	(16–13)	Niewiadomska 9	Tri Lilije Hall, Laško; Attendance: 50; Referees: Mahmoud, El-Beltagy (EGY)
30 June 2022; 12:30	3× (suspension)	Report	3× (yellow card) 3× (suspension) 1× (red card)	Tri Lilije Hall, Laško; Attendance: 50; Referees: Mahmoud, El-Beltagy (EGY)

==== 31st place game ====
1 July 2022; 14:00	Mexico	26–28	United States	Golovec Hall, Celje; Attendance: 50; Referees: Faraj, Taqi (KUW)
1 July 2022; 14:00	Govea 6	(8–11)	Ready 9	Golovec Hall, Celje; Attendance: 50; Referees: Faraj, Taqi (KUW)
1 July 2022; 14:00	1× (yellow card) 3× (suspension)	Report	2× (suspension)	Golovec Hall, Celje; Attendance: 50; Referees: Faraj, Taqi (KUW)

==== 29th place game ====
1 July 2022; 10:00	Iran	20–35	Italy	Golovec Hall, Celje; Attendance: 30; Referees: Sosa, Lemes (URU)
1 July 2022; 10:00	three players 4	(10–19)	Eghianruwa 7	Golovec Hall, Celje; Attendance: 30; Referees: Sosa, Lemes (URU)
1 July 2022; 10:00	1× (suspension)	Report		Golovec Hall, Celje; Attendance: 30; Referees: Sosa, Lemes (URU)

==== 27th place game ====
1 July 2022; 18:30	Chile	25–24	Kazakhstan	Tri Lilije Hall, Laško; Attendance: 50; Referees: Hannes, Hannes (GER)
1 July 2022; 18:30	Carrasco 5	(15–10)	Berenda 8	Tri Lilije Hall, Laško; Attendance: 50; Referees: Hannes, Hannes (GER)
1 July 2022; 18:30	1× (yellow card) 4× (suspension)	Report	1× (yellow card) 2× (suspension)	Tri Lilije Hall, Laško; Attendance: 50; Referees: Hannes, Hannes (GER)

==== 25th place game ====
1 July 2022; 16:30	India	30–41	Argentina	Tri Lilije Hall, Laško; Attendance: 38; Referees: Lee, Lee (KOR)
1 July 2022; 16:30	Bhawana 10	(12–19)	Romero 8	Tri Lilije Hall, Laško; Attendance: 38; Referees: Lee, Lee (KOR)
1 July 2022; 16:30	2× (suspension)	Report	3× (suspension)	Tri Lilije Hall, Laško; Attendance: 38; Referees: Lee, Lee (KOR)

==== 23rd place game ====
Cancelled	Guinea	10–0	Austria

==== 21st place game ====
1 July 2022; 10:00	Lithuania	27–26	Brazil	Zlatorog Arena, Celje; Attendance: 30; Referees: Al-Zayyat, Awwad (JOR)
1 July 2022; 10:00	Mackonytė 9	(13–13)	Ferreira 8	Zlatorog Arena, Celje; Attendance: 30; Referees: Al-Zayyat, Awwad (JOR)
1 July 2022; 10:00	2× (suspension)	Report	4× (suspension) 1× (red card)	Zlatorog Arena, Celje; Attendance: 30; Referees: Al-Zayyat, Awwad (JOR)

==== 19th place game ====
1 July 2022; 12:00	Slovakia	31–36	South Korea	Golovec Hall, Celje; Attendance: 50; Referees: Conberse, Correa (ARG)
1 July 2022; 12:00	Dvorščáková 6	(15–15)	Ji 11	Golovec Hall, Celje; Attendance: 50; Referees: Conberse, Correa (ARG)
1 July 2022; 12:00	4× (suspension)	Report	1× (yellow card) 2× (suspension)	Golovec Hall, Celje; Attendance: 50; Referees: Conberse, Correa (ARG)

==== 17th place game ====
1 July 2022; 12:00	Romania	22–23	Poland	Zlatorog Arena, Celje; Attendance: 30; Referees: Balvan, Praštalo (BIH)
1 July 2022; 12:00	Lixandroiu 7	(14–14)	Głębocka, Pastuszka 5	Zlatorog Arena, Celje; Attendance: 30; Referees: Balvan, Praštalo (BIH)
1 July 2022; 12:00	1× (yellow card) 5× (suspension) 1× (red card)	Report	2× (yellow card) 5× (suspension) 1× (red card)	Zlatorog Arena, Celje; Attendance: 30; Referees: Balvan, Praštalo (BIH)

== Main round ==
Points obtained in the matches between the same teams from the preliminary round were carried over.

=== Group I ===
Pos	Team	Pld	W	D	L	GF	GA	GD	Pts	Qualification
1	Netherlands	3	3	0	0	96	76	+20	6	Quarterfinals
2	Sweden	3	2	0	1	94	69	+25	4	Quarterfinals
3	Japan	3	1	0	2	84	96	−12	2	9–12th place semifinals
4	Tunisia	3	0	0	3	74	107	−33	0	13–16th place semifinals

Source: IHF
Rules for classification: 1) points; 2) head-to-head points; 3) head-to-head goal difference; 4) head-to-head number of goals scored; 5) goal difference.

26 June 2022; 18:30	Netherlands	41–25	Tunisia	Zlatorog Arena, Celje; Referees: Lee, Lee (KOR)
26 June 2022; 18:30	Daleman 9	(20–11)	Ben Hassine, Chandarli 6	Zlatorog Arena, Celje; Referees: Lee, Lee (KOR)
26 June 2022; 18:30	1× (yellow card) 2× (suspension) 1× (red card)	Report	4× (suspension)	Zlatorog Arena, Celje; Referees: Lee, Lee (KOR)

26 June 2022; 20:30	Sweden	40–21	Japan	Zlatorog Arena, Celje; Attendance: 150; Referees: Sosa, Lemes (URU)
26 June 2022; 20:30	Axnér 10	(22–11)	Ishikawa 8	Zlatorog Arena, Celje; Attendance: 150; Referees: Sosa, Lemes (URU)
26 June 2022; 20:30	1× (yellow card)	Report	1× (yellow card) 2× (suspension)	Zlatorog Arena, Celje; Attendance: 150; Referees: Sosa, Lemes (URU)

28 June 2022; 14:30	Netherlands	23–22	Sweden	Zlatorog Arena, Celje; Attendance: 120; Referees: Covalciuc, Covalciuc (MDA)
28 June 2022; 14:30	Molenaar 6	(10–12)	Axnér 8	Zlatorog Arena, Celje; Attendance: 120; Referees: Covalciuc, Covalciuc (MDA)
28 June 2022; 14:30	2× (yellow card) 2× (suspension)	Report	1× (yellow card) 4× (suspension)	Zlatorog Arena, Celje; Attendance: 120; Referees: Covalciuc, Covalciuc (MDA)

28 June 2022; 16:30	Japan	34–24	Tunisia	Zlatorog Arena, Celje; Attendance: 100; Referees: Bolic, Hurich (AUT)
28 June 2022; 16:30	Ishikawa 7	(14–10)	Ben Hassine 10	Zlatorog Arena, Celje; Attendance: 100; Referees: Bolic, Hurich (AUT)
28 June 2022; 16:30	5× (suspension)	Report	1× (suspension) 1× (red card)	Zlatorog Arena, Celje; Attendance: 100; Referees: Bolic, Hurich (AUT)

=== Group II ===
Pos	Team	Pld	W	D	L	GF	GA	GD	Pts	Qualification
1	Norway	3	2	1	0	101	92	+9	5	Quarterfinals
2	Denmark	3	1	1	1	75	74	+1	3	Quarterfinals
3	Montenegro	3	1	0	2	71	80	−9	2 (Note: France 24–25 Montenegro)	9–12th place semifinals
4	France	3	0	2	1	77	78	−1	2	13–16th place semifinals

Source: IHF
Rules for classification: 1) points; 2) head-to-head points; 3) head-to-head goal difference; 4) head-to-head number of goals scored; 5) goal difference.
Notes:

26 June 2022; 18:30	Denmark	32–35	Norway	Golovec Hall, Celje; Attendance: 100; Referees: Konjičanin, Konjičanin (BIH)
26 June 2022; 18:30	three players 8	(16–18)	Røhne 11	Golovec Hall, Celje; Attendance: 100; Referees: Konjičanin, Konjičanin (BIH)
26 June 2022; 18:30	1× (suspension)	Report	2× (suspension)	Golovec Hall, Celje; Attendance: 100; Referees: Konjičanin, Konjičanin (BIH)

26 June 2022; 20:30	France	24–25	Montenegro	Golovec Hall, Celje; Attendance: 70; Referees: Paolantoni, García (ARG)
26 June 2022; 20:30	Grandveau 5	(11–12)	G. Marsenić 7	Golovec Hall, Celje; Attendance: 70; Referees: Paolantoni, García (ARG)
26 June 2022; 20:30	3× (suspension)	Report	1× (yellow card) 6× (suspension)	Golovec Hall, Celje; Attendance: 70; Referees: Paolantoni, García (ARG)

28 June 2022; 14:30	Denmark	19–19	France	Golovec Hall, Celje; Attendance: 85; Referees: Sekulić, Jovandić (SRB)
28 June 2022; 14:30	Skøtt 5	(11–11)	Bouktit 4	Golovec Hall, Celje; Attendance: 85; Referees: Sekulić, Jovandić (SRB)
28 June 2022; 14:30	1× (suspension)	Report	3× (suspension)	Golovec Hall, Celje; Attendance: 85; Referees: Sekulić, Jovandić (SRB)

28 June 2022; 16:30	Montenegro	26–32	Norway	Golovec Hall, Celje; Attendance: 120; Referees: Budzák, Záhradník (SVK)
28 June 2022; 16:30	G. Marsenić 9	(10–13)	Iversen 7	Golovec Hall, Celje; Attendance: 120; Referees: Budzák, Záhradník (SVK)
28 June 2022; 16:30	2× (yellow card) 4× (suspension) 1× (red card)	Report	2× (suspension)	Golovec Hall, Celje; Attendance: 120; Referees: Budzák, Záhradník (SVK)

=== Group III ===
Pos	Team	Pld	W	D	L	GF	GA	GD	Pts	Qualification
1	Germany	3	2	0	1	80	66	+14	4 (Note: Germany 2 Pts, +8 GD; Angola 2 Pts −1 GD; Czech Republic 2 Pts, −7 GD)	Quarterfinals
2	Angola	3	2	0	1	82	79	+3	4	Quarterfinals
3	Czech Republic	3	2	0	1	75	79	−4	4	9–12th place semifinals
4	Slovenia (H)	3	0	0	3	65	78	−13	0	13–16th place semifinals

Source: IHF
Rules for classification: 1) points; 2) head-to-head points; 3) head-to-head goal difference; 4) head-to-head number of goals scored; 5) goal difference.
(H) Hosts
Notes:

27 June 2022; 18:30	Angola	25–21	Slovenia	Golovec Hall, Celje; Attendance: 300; Referees: Gasmi, Gasmi (FRA)
27 June 2022; 18:30	Pascoal 8	(17–7)	Novak 6	Golovec Hall, Celje; Attendance: 300; Referees: Gasmi, Gasmi (FRA)
27 June 2022; 18:30	1× (yellow card) 6× (suspension) 1× (red card)	Report	1× (yellow card) 1× (suspension)	Golovec Hall, Celje; Attendance: 300; Referees: Gasmi, Gasmi (FRA)

27 June 2022; 20:30	Germany	20–24	Czech Republic	Golovec Hall, Celje; Attendance: 100; Referees: Braseth, Sundet (NOR)
27 June 2022; 20:30	Engel 6	(14–14)	Cholevová 8	Golovec Hall, Celje; Attendance: 100; Referees: Braseth, Sundet (NOR)
27 June 2022; 20:30	2× (suspension)	Report	4× (suspension)	Golovec Hall, Celje; Attendance: 100; Referees: Braseth, Sundet (NOR)

28 June 2022; 18:30	Czech Republic	26–23	Slovenia	Golovec Hall, Celje; Attendance: 300; Referees: El-Saied, El-Saied (EGY)
28 June 2022; 18:30	Kroftová 7	(17–13)	Novak 8	Golovec Hall, Celje; Attendance: 300; Referees: El-Saied, El-Saied (EGY)
28 June 2022; 18:30	5× (suspension)	Report	1× (yellow card) 4× (suspension)	Golovec Hall, Celje; Attendance: 300; Referees: El-Saied, El-Saied (EGY)

28 June 2022; 20:30	Angola	21–33	Germany	Golovec Hall, Celje; Attendance: 60; Referees: Paolantoni, García (ARG)
28 June 2022; 20:30	Rosario 9	(10–16)	Engel 9	Golovec Hall, Celje; Attendance: 60; Referees: Paolantoni, García (ARG)
28 June 2022; 20:30	1× (yellow card) 6× (suspension)	Report	1× (yellow card) 2× (suspension)	Golovec Hall, Celje; Attendance: 60; Referees: Paolantoni, García (ARG)

=== Group IV ===
Pos	Team	Pld	W	D	L	GF	GA	GD	Pts	Qualification
1	Hungary	3	3	0	0	108	60	+48	6	Quarterfinals
2	Switzerland	3	2	0	1	71	84	−13	4	Quarterfinals
3	Croatia	3	1	0	2	62	68	−6	2	9–12th place semifinals
4	Egypt	3	0	0	3	60	89	−29	0	13–16th place semifinals

Source: IHF
Rules for classification: 1) points; 2) head-to-head points; 3) head-to-head goal difference; 4) head-to-head number of goals scored; 5) goal difference.

27 June 2022; 18:30	Croatia	24–17	Egypt	Zlatorog Arena, Celje; Attendance: 100; Referees: Bolic, Hurich (AUT)
27 June 2022; 18:30	Zrnić 5	(14–9)	three players 4	Zlatorog Arena, Celje; Attendance: 100; Referees: Bolic, Hurich (AUT)
27 June 2022; 18:30	2× (suspension)	Report	1× (yellow card) 1× (suspension)	Zlatorog Arena, Celje; Attendance: 100; Referees: Bolic, Hurich (AUT)

27 June 2022; 20:30	Hungary	40–23	Switzerland	Zlatorog Arena, Celje; Attendance: 60; Referees: Covalciuc, Covalciuc (MDA)
27 June 2022; 20:30	Farkas, Juhász 5	(20–11)	Schmid 8	Zlatorog Arena, Celje; Attendance: 60; Referees: Covalciuc, Covalciuc (MDA)
27 June 2022; 20:30		Report		Zlatorog Arena, Celje; Attendance: 60; Referees: Covalciuc, Covalciuc (MDA)

28 June 2022; 18:30	Croatia	17–29	Hungary	Zlatorog Arena, Celje; Attendance: 70; Referees: Hannes, Hannes (GER)
28 June 2022; 18:30	Birtić 6	(8–13)	Farkas 7	Zlatorog Arena, Celje; Attendance: 70; Referees: Hannes, Hannes (GER)
28 June 2022; 18:30	6× (suspension)	Report	3× (yellow card) 2× (suspension)	Zlatorog Arena, Celje; Attendance: 70; Referees: Hannes, Hannes (GER)

28 June 2022; 20:30	Switzerland	26–23	Egypt	Zlatorog Arena, Celje; Attendance: 30; Referees: Sosa, Lemes (URU)
28 June 2022; 20:30	Jund 7	(15–13)	Ibrahim 6	Zlatorog Arena, Celje; Attendance: 30; Referees: Sosa, Lemes (URU)
28 June 2022; 20:30	2× (suspension)	Report	1× (suspension)	Zlatorog Arena, Celje; Attendance: 30; Referees: Sosa, Lemes (URU)

== Knockout stage ==
=== Bracket ===
Championship bracket

Quarter-finals
30 June
Netherlands	29
Angola	21
30 June
Norway	37
Switzerland	20
30 June
Germany	24
Sweden	36
30 June
Hungary	30
Denmark	26

Semi-finals
1 July
Netherlands	23
Norway	32
1 July
Sweden	25
Hungary	33

Final
3 July
Norway	31
Hungary	29
Third place
3 July
Netherlands	31
Sweden	20

5–8th place bracket

5–8th place semifinals
1 July
Angola	26
Switzerland	21
1 July
Germany	27
Denmark	38

Fifth place game
3 July
Angola	21
Denmark	23
Seventh place game
3 July
Switzerland	27
Germany	29

9–12th place bracket

9–12th place semifinals
30 June
Japan (pen.)	28 (4)
Czech Republic	28 (2)
30 June
Montenegro	24
Croatia	23

Ninth place game
1 July
Japan	35
Montenegro	27
Eleventh place game
1 July
Czech Republic	25
Croatia	23

13–16th place bracket

13–16th place semifinals
30 June
Tunisia	25
Slovenia	28
30 June
France	31
Egypt	21

13th place game
1 July
Slovenia	16
France	31
15th place game
1 July
Tunisia	26
Egypt	28

=== Quarterfinals ===
30 June 2022; 18:15	Netherlands	29–21	Angola	Zlatorog Arena, Celje; Attendance: 50; Referees: Bolic, Hurich (AUT)
30 June 2022; 18:15	Molenaar 9	(17–9)	Belo, Pascoal 4	Zlatorog Arena, Celje; Attendance: 50; Referees: Bolic, Hurich (AUT)
30 June 2022; 18:15	2× (yellow card) 1× (suspension)	Report	2× (yellow card) 6× (suspension) 1× (red card)	Zlatorog Arena, Celje; Attendance: 50; Referees: Bolic, Hurich (AUT)

30 June 2022; 18:15	Norway	37–20	Switzerland	Golovec Hall, Celje; Attendance: 80; Referees: Lee, Lee (KOR)
30 June 2022; 18:15	Frei, Gald 6	(15–9)	Emmenegger 6	Golovec Hall, Celje; Attendance: 80; Referees: Lee, Lee (KOR)
30 June 2022; 18:15	1× (yellow card) 2× (suspension)	Report	1× (suspension)	Golovec Hall, Celje; Attendance: 80; Referees: Lee, Lee (KOR)

30 June 2022; 20:30	Germany	24–36	Sweden	Zlatorog Arena, Celje; Attendance: 70; Referees: Sosa, Lemes (URU)
30 June 2022; 20:30	Hampel 6	(11–21)	Bergsten 9	Zlatorog Arena, Celje; Attendance: 70; Referees: Sosa, Lemes (URU)
30 June 2022; 20:30	1× (suspension)	Report	4× (suspension)	Zlatorog Arena, Celje; Attendance: 70; Referees: Sosa, Lemes (URU)

30 June 2022; 20:30	Hungary	30–26	Denmark	Golovec Hall, Celje; Attendance: 200; Referees: Gasmi, Gasmi (FRA)
30 June 2022; 20:30	Kajdon 7	(11–12)	four players 4	Golovec Hall, Celje; Attendance: 200; Referees: Gasmi, Gasmi (FRA)
30 June 2022; 20:30	2× (yellow card) 3× (suspension)	Report	1× (suspension)	Golovec Hall, Celje; Attendance: 200; Referees: Gasmi, Gasmi (FRA)

=== 13–16th place semifinals ===
30 June 2022; 14:00	France	31–21	Egypt	Golovec Hall, Celje; Attendance: 50; Referees: Hannes, Hannes (GER)
30 June 2022; 14:00	Mlamali 6	(15–8)	Ibrahim 6	Golovec Hall, Celje; Attendance: 50; Referees: Hannes, Hannes (GER)
30 June 2022; 14:00	1× (yellow card) 3× (suspension)	Report	1× (suspension)	Golovec Hall, Celje; Attendance: 50; Referees: Hannes, Hannes (GER)

30 June 2022; 16:00	Tunisia	25–28	Slovenia	Golovec Hall, Celje; Attendance: 200; Referees: Correa, Correa (BRA)
30 June 2022; 16:00	Ouertani 7	(16–13)	Žener 7	Golovec Hall, Celje; Attendance: 200; Referees: Correa, Correa (BRA)
30 June 2022; 16:00	1× (yellow card) 3× (suspension)	Report	1× (yellow card) 4× (suspension)	Golovec Hall, Celje; Attendance: 200; Referees: Correa, Correa (BRA)

=== 9–12th place semifinals ===
30 June 2022
14:00
Japan
28–28
Czech Republic
Zlatorog Arena, Celje
Attendance: 50
Referees: Balvan, Praštalo (BIH)
Fujiwara, Yoshino 5
(17–13)
Cholevová 10
4× (suspension)
Report
2× (yellow card) 4× (suspension)

FT: 28–28 Pen: 4–2

30 June 2022; 16:00	Montenegro	24–23	Croatia	Zlatorog Arena, Celje; Attendance: 30; Referees: Braseth, Sundet (NOR)
30 June 2022; 16:00	Kadović 12	(10–13)	Zrnić 10	Zlatorog Arena, Celje; Attendance: 30; Referees: Braseth, Sundet (NOR)
30 June 2022; 16:00	3× (suspension)	Report	1× (yellow card) 3× (suspension)	Zlatorog Arena, Celje; Attendance: 30; Referees: Braseth, Sundet (NOR)

=== 5–8th place semifinals ===
1 July 2022; 18:15	Angola	26–21	Switzerland	Golovec Hall, Celje; Attendance: 50; Referees: Paolantoni, García (ARG)
1 July 2022; 18:15	Belo 8	(11–8)	Schmid 11	Golovec Hall, Celje; Attendance: 50; Referees: Paolantoni, García (ARG)
1 July 2022; 18:15	7× (suspension)	Report	2× (suspension)	Golovec Hall, Celje; Attendance: 50; Referees: Paolantoni, García (ARG)

1 July 2022; 20:30	Germany	27–38	Denmark	Golovec Hall, Celje; Attendance: 150; Referees: El-Saied, El-Saied (EGY)
1 July 2022; 20:30	Heider 6	(13–20)	Klokker 8	Golovec Hall, Celje; Attendance: 150; Referees: El-Saied, El-Saied (EGY)
1 July 2022; 20:30	2× (suspension)	Report	3× (suspension)	Golovec Hall, Celje; Attendance: 150; Referees: El-Saied, El-Saied (EGY)

=== Semifinals ===
1 July 2022; 18:15	Netherlands	23–32	Norway	Zlatorog Arena, Celje; Attendance: 150; Referees: Sekulić, Jovandić (SRB)
1 July 2022; 18:15	Molenaar 7	(14–14)	M. Andersen, Nypan 6	Zlatorog Arena, Celje; Attendance: 150; Referees: Sekulić, Jovandić (SRB)
1 July 2022; 18:15	2× (yellow card) 1× (suspension)	Report	1× (yellow card) 1× (suspension)	Zlatorog Arena, Celje; Attendance: 150; Referees: Sekulić, Jovandić (SRB)

1 July 2022; 20:30	Sweden	25–33	Hungary	Zlatorog Arena, Celje; Attendance: 250; Referees: Konjičanin, Konjičanin (BIH)
1 July 2022; 20:30	Axnér 6	(14–15)	Farkas 11	Zlatorog Arena, Celje; Attendance: 250; Referees: Konjičanin, Konjičanin (BIH)
1 July 2022; 20:30	1× (yellow card) 2× (suspension)	Report	2× (yellow card) 3× (suspension)	Zlatorog Arena, Celje; Attendance: 250; Referees: Konjičanin, Konjičanin (BIH)

=== 15th place game ===
1 July 2022; 14:30	Tunisia	26–28	Egypt	Tri Lilije Hall, Laško; Attendance: 30; Referees: Gasmi, Gasmi (FRA)
1 July 2022; 14:30	Ben Hassine 6	(13–17)	Seoudy 9	Tri Lilije Hall, Laško; Attendance: 30; Referees: Gasmi, Gasmi (FRA)
1 July 2022; 14:30	1× (suspension)	Report	1× (suspension)	Tri Lilije Hall, Laško; Attendance: 30; Referees: Gasmi, Gasmi (FRA)

=== 13th place game ===
1 July 2022; 16:00	Slovenia	16–31	France	Zlatorog Arena, Celje; Attendance: 100; Referees: Budzák, Záhradník (SVK)
1 July 2022; 16:00	Novak 5	(7–16)	Bouktit 8	Zlatorog Arena, Celje; Attendance: 100; Referees: Budzák, Záhradník (SVK)
1 July 2022; 16:00	4× (suspension)	Report	2× (suspension)	Zlatorog Arena, Celje; Attendance: 100; Referees: Budzák, Záhradník (SVK)

=== Eleventh place game ===
1 July 2022; 16:00	Czech Republic	25–23	Croatia	Golovec Hall, Celje; Attendance: 50; Referees: Mahmoud, El-Beltagy (EGY)
1 July 2022; 16:00	Cholevová 12	(10–8)	Krezo, Vuljak 5	Golovec Hall, Celje; Attendance: 50; Referees: Mahmoud, El-Beltagy (EGY)
1 July 2022; 16:00	6× (suspension)	Report	4× (suspension)	Golovec Hall, Celje; Attendance: 50; Referees: Mahmoud, El-Beltagy (EGY)

=== Ninth place game ===
1 July 2022; 14:00	Japan	35–27	Montenegro	Zlatorog Arena, Celje; Attendance: 80; Referees: Covalciuc, Covalciuc (MDA)
1 July 2022; 14:00	Ishikawa 11	(18–12)	Kadović 5	Zlatorog Arena, Celje; Attendance: 80; Referees: Covalciuc, Covalciuc (MDA)
1 July 2022; 14:00	1× (suspension)	Report	1× (yellow card) 3× (suspension)	Zlatorog Arena, Celje; Attendance: 80; Referees: Covalciuc, Covalciuc (MDA)

=== Seventh place game ===
3 July 2022; 10:30	Switzerland	27–29	Germany	Zlatorog Arena, Celje; Attendance: 50; Referees: Covalciuc, Covalciuc (MDA)
3 July 2022; 10:30	Schmid 10	(11–17)	Engel 8	Zlatorog Arena, Celje; Attendance: 50; Referees: Covalciuc, Covalciuc (MDA)
3 July 2022; 10:30	1× (yellow card) 1× (suspension)	Report	1× (yellow card) 2× (suspension)	Zlatorog Arena, Celje; Attendance: 50; Referees: Covalciuc, Covalciuc (MDA)

=== Fifth place game ===
3 July 2022; 12:45	Angola	21–23	Denmark	Zlatorog Arena, Celje; Attendance: 150; Referees: Hannes, Hannes (GER)
3 July 2022; 12:45	Pascoal 8	(11–12)	Skøtt 8	Zlatorog Arena, Celje; Attendance: 150; Referees: Hannes, Hannes (GER)
3 July 2022; 12:45	8× (suspension)	Report	1× (yellow card) 1× (suspension)	Zlatorog Arena, Celje; Attendance: 150; Referees: Hannes, Hannes (GER)

=== Third place game ===
3 July 2022; 15:00	Netherlands	31–20	Sweden	Zlatorog Arena, Celje; Attendance: 250; Referees: El-Saied, El-Saied (EGY)
3 July 2022; 15:00	Molenaar 8	(16–12)	Bergsten 5	Zlatorog Arena, Celje; Attendance: 250; Referees: El-Saied, El-Saied (EGY)
3 July 2022; 15:00	1× (yellow card) 2× (suspension)	Report	1× (yellow card) 2× (suspension)	Zlatorog Arena, Celje; Attendance: 250; Referees: El-Saied, El-Saied (EGY)

=== Final ===
3 July 2022; 17:30	Norway	31–29	Hungary	Zlatorog Arena, Celje; Attendance: 1,000; Referees: Paolantoni, García (ARG)
3 July 2022; 17:30	F. Andersen 7	(17–15)	Kajdon 8	Zlatorog Arena, Celje; Attendance: 1,000; Referees: Paolantoni, García (ARG)
3 July 2022; 17:30	1× (yellow card) 5× (suspension)	Report	1× (yellow card) 2× (suspension)	Zlatorog Arena, Celje; Attendance: 1,000; Referees: Paolantoni, García (ARG)

== Final ranking ==
Rank	Team
1st place, gold medalist(s)	Norway
2nd place, silver medalist(s)	Hungary
3rd place, bronze medalist(s)	Netherlands
4	Sweden
5	Denmark
6	Angola
7	Germany
8	Switzerland
9	Japan
10	Montenegro
11	Czech Republic
12	Croatia
13	France
14	Slovenia
15	Egypt
16	Tunisia
17	Poland
18	Romania
19	South Korea
20	Slovakia
21	Lithuania
22	Brazil
23	Guinea
24	Austria
25	Argentina
26	India
27	Chile
28	Kazakhstan
29	Italy
30	Iran
31	United States
32	Mexico

== Statistics and awards ==
=== Top goalscorers ===
Rank	Name	Goals	Shots	%
1	(Czech Republic) Charlotte Cholevová	62	97	64
1	(Netherlands) Kim Molenaar	62	95	65
3	(India) Bhawana Sharma	58	108	54
4	(Montenegro) Nada Kadović	50	65	77
5	(Austria) Kristina Dramac	49	74	66
6	(South Korea) Lee Yeon-song	47	81	58
7	(Japan) Sora Ishikawa	46	80	58
8	(Germany) Nina Engel	44	74	59
8	(Slovenia) Erin Novak	44	74	59
8	(South Korea) Ji Eun-hye	44	67	66
8	(Switzerland) Tabea Schmid	44	52	85

Source: IHF

=== Top goalkeepers ===
Rank	Name	%	Saves	Shots
1	(Czech Republic) Adéla Srpová	43	38	89
1	(France) Jemima Kabeya	43	62	144
3	(Italy) Maddalena Cabrini	41	51	125
3	(Slovenia) Saša Posega	41	7	17
5	(Poland) Aleksandra Hypka	40	64	160
6	(Germany) Alexandra Humpert	38	73	193
7	(Lithuania) Skirmantė Gečaitė	37	88	234
8	(Austria) Denise Kaufmann	36	27	74
8	(Croatia) Iva Brkljačić	36	64	176
8	(Montenegro) Milena Vujisić	36	36	100
8	(Norway) June Krogh	36	88	244

Source: IHF

=== All-Star Team ===
The all-star team was announced on 3 July 2022.

Position	Player
Goalkeeper	(Norway) June Krogh
Left wing	(Netherlands) Roos Daleman
Left back	(Norway) Martine Kårigstad Andersen
Centre back	(Hungary) Blanka Kajdon
Right back	(Japan) Sora Ishikawa
Right wing	(Sweden) Clara Petersson Bergsten
Pivot	(Norway) Kaja Røhne
MVP	(Netherlands) Kim Molenaar

2022 Junior Women's World Champions

Norway
Second title

Team roster

Jenny Utne, Susanne Amundsen, Kaja Løken, Avril Mikkelsen Frei, Frida Brandbu Andersen, Johanne Halseth Nypan, Henriette Espetvedt Eggen, Martine Kårigstad Andersen, Johanna Fossum, Kaja Røhne, Charlotte Koffeld Iversen, Maria Bergslien Gald, Rikke Midtfjeld, Celina Vatne, Maja Furu Sæteren, Lina Waage Mossestad, June Krogh.
