= ŽRK Budućnost Podgorica =

Montenegrin handball club

WHC Budućnost
- Full name: Ženski Rukometni Klub Budućnost
- Short name: ŽRK Budućnost
- Founded: 1949
- Arena: Morača Sports Center and Bemax Arena
- Capacity: 6000 and 2,200
- Head coach: Maja Savić
- Captain: Itana Grbić
- League: Montenegrin Championship
- 2025–26: 1st
- Club colours
Home	Away

ŽRK Budućnost is a professional women's handball team from Podgorica, Montenegro (previously, the club also appeared under the names ZRK Budućnost MONET, Budućnost Brillant, Budućnost Bemax and Budućnost Titograd). Among the numerous titles, Budućnost is two-times winner of EHF Women's Champions League

The club was founded on February 13, 1949, and played its first official game in 1950. The first trophy, the Cup of Yugoslavia, was won in 1984. In 1985, ŽRK Budućnost won the Yugoslavian championship, and went on to win their first European title (Cup Winners' Cup) that same year. At the time, the club was pronounced as "the best in the country". As of 1988/1989 season, ŽRK Budućnost dominated the national competition, and was the champion of all the now defunct countries – SFR Yugoslavia, FR Yugoslavia, Serbia & Montenegro. The club continued to dominate the national championship in Montenegro since it gained independence in 2006.
ŽRK Budućnost won the titles of European Champion twice - on seasons 2012 and 2015.

ŽRK Budućnost is strongly supported by Budućnost sports fans, the Varvari.

ŽRK Budućnost is a part of Budućnost Podgorica sports society.

== Kits ==
HOME
2014–15	2015–17	2017–23	2023–24

AWAY
2014–15	2015–16	2016–17	2017–18	2019–20	2020–21	2021–23	2023–25

THIRD
2014–15	2015–16	2019–

== Records of achievements ==
International titles (6)

- Champions League:
  - Winners (2): 2012, 2015
- Cup Winners' Cup:
  - Winners (3): 1985, 2006, 2010
- EHF Cup
  - Winners (1): 1987
- Women's Regional Handball League:
  - Winners (8): 2010, 2011, 2012, 2013, 2014, 2015, 2016, 2019

National Championships (37)

- Yugoslav Championship:
  - Winners (4): 1985, 1989, 1990, 1992
- FR Yugoslavia, Serbia & Montenegro Championship:
  - Winners (14): 1993, 1994, 1995, 1996, 1997, 1998, 1999, 2000, 2001, 2002, 2003, 2004, 2005, 2006
- Montenegrin Championship:
  - Winners (19): 2007, 2008, 2009, 2010, 2011, 2012, 2013, 2014, 2015, 2016, 2017, 2018, 2019, 2021, 2022, 2023, 2024, 2025, 2026

National Cups (31)

- Yugoslav Cup:
  - Winners (2): 1984, 1989
- FR Yugoslavia, Serbia & Montenegro Cup:
  - Winners (9): 1995, 1996, 1997, 1998, 2000, 2001, 2002, 2005, 2006
- Montenegrin Cup:
  - Winners (20): 2007, 2008, 2009, 2010, 2011, 2012, 2013, 2014, 2015, 2016, 2017, 2018, 2019, 2020, 2021, 2022, 2023, 2024, 2025, 2026

Others

- 4 times named The Best Club of Yugoslavia (1985, 1987, 1993, 1998)

== Champions League ==
- 1985/86 1/2 FINAL
- 1989/90 1/4 FINAL
- 1990/91 1/4 FINAL
- 1995/96 1/8 FINAL
- 1996/97 1/8 FINAL
- 1997/98 1/2 FINAL
- 1998/99 1/2 FINAL
- 1999/00 1/2 FINAL
- 2000/01 1/2 FINAL
- 2001/02 1/2 FINAL
- 2002/03 1/4 FINAL
- 2003/04 1/4 FINAL
- 2004/05 Group Matches
- 2005/06 Group Matches 3rd – CWC Winner
- 2006/07 Group Matches
- 2007/08 Group Matches 3rd – CWC 1/8 FINAL
- 2008/09 Main Round
- 2009/10 Group Matches 3rd – CWC Winner
- 2010/11 1/2 FINAL
- 2011/12 Winner
- 2012/13 Main Round
- 2013/14 Runner-up
- 2014/15 Winner
- 2015/16 Final Four - 4th
- 2016/17 Final Four - 4th
- 2017/18 Quarter-final
- 2018/19 Quarter-final
- 2020/21 Quarter-final
- 2021/22 Group Matches
- 2022/23 1/8 FINAL
- 2023/24 Group Matches
- 2024/25 Group Matches

== Team ==
=== Current squad ===
Squad for the 2026-27 season

Goalkeepers

- 1 (Montenegro) Andrea Škerović
- 12 (Montenegro) Armelle Attingré
- 16 (Montenegro) Marija Marsenić

Left Wingers

- 5 (Montenegro) Bojana Peličić
- 77 (Montenegro) Mia Ulićević
- 88 (Montenegro) Nađa Kadović
- 91 (Montenegro) Ivona Pavićević

Right Wingers

- 34 (Serbia) Dunja Radević
- 37 (Montenegro) Nina Bulatović

Line players

- 4 (Montenegro) Andrijana Popović
- 11 (Montenegro) Ivana Godeč
- 13 (Montenegro) Žana Bulatović
- 45 (Montenegro) Sofija Delević

Left Backs

- 9 (Montenegro) Đurđina Jauković
- 23 (Montenegro) Ivana Savić
- 24 (Serbia) Jovana Skrobić
- 80 (Montenegro) Jelena Radivojević

Central Backs

- 10 (Faroe Islands) Súna Hansen
- 96 (Montenegro) Itana Grbić

Right Backs

- 25 (Croatia) Hannah Vuljak
- 99 (Montenegro) Jelena Vukčević

=== Transfers ===
Transfers for the 2027–28 season

Joining

- (Montenegro) Tatjana Brnović (LP) (from (Romania) CSM București)

Leaving

=== Staff members ===
Staff for the 2025–26 season

- (Montenegro) Head Coach: Maja Savić
- (Montenegro) Assistant Coach:
- (Montenegro) Goalkeeping Coach: Novak Ristović
- (Montenegro) Fitness Coach: Danica Delić
- (Montenegro) Fiziotherapeut: Andrija Damjanović
- (Montenegro) Fiziotherapeut: Mitar Vujović
- (Montenegro) Statistician: Vladimir Kovačević

== Statistics ==
=== Top scorers in the EHF Champions League ===
(All-Time) – Last updated after the 2023/24 season

Rank	Name	Seasons played	Goals
1	(Montenegro) Katarina Bulatović	8	571
2	(Montenegro) Milena Raičević	15	559
3	(Montenegro) Jovanka Radičević	9	400
4	(Romania) Cristina Neagu	4	350
5	(Montenegro) Majda Mehmedović	11	282
6	(Montenegro) Đurđina Jauković	5	238
7	(Montenegro) Radmila Petrović	10	235
8	(Serbia) Dragana Cvijić	6	221
9	(Montenegro) Marija Jovanović	6	194
10	(Montenegro) Bojana Popović	6	191*

- There is no data available from 4 seasons (1998-2002).

== Notable former players ==
- (Montenegro) Marijana "Maja" Bulatović
- (Montenegro) Zorica Pavićević
- (Montenegro) Katica Lješković
- (Montenegro) Olga Sekulić
- (Montenegro) Svetlana Antić
- (Montenegro) Ljiljana Vučević
- (Montenegro) / (Austria) Stanka Božović
- (Montenegro) Mirsada Ganić
- (Montenegro) Vesna Durković
- (Montenegro) Dragana Pešić
- (Montenegro) Marta Bojanović
- (Montenegro) Mirjana Milović
- (Montenegro) Milanka Šćepanović
- (Montenegro) Nataša Tomašević
- (Montenegro) Suzana Ganić
- (Montenegro) Tatjana Jovanović
- (Montenegro) Tanja Raonić
- (Montenegro) Željka Ratković
- (Montenegro) Vesna Lekić
- (Montenegro) Tatjana Jeraminok
- (Montenegro) Anica Đurović
- (Montenegro) Maja Savić
- (Montenegro) Dragica Orlandić
- (Montenegro) Mira Čelebić
- (Montenegro) Aida Dorović
- (Montenegro) Bojana Popović
- (Montenegro) Sanja Jovović
- (Montenegro) Marina Rakočević
- (Montenegro) Snežana Damjanac
- (Montenegro) Radmila Petrović
- (Montenegro) Anđela Bulatović
- (Montenegro) Sonja Barjaktarović
- (Montenegro) Marija Jovanović
- (Montenegro) Ana Radović
- (Montenegro) Biljana Novović
- (Montenegro) Suzana Lazović
- (Montenegro) Mirjana Milenković
- (Montenegro) Katarina Bulatović
- (Montenegro) Ana Đokić
- (Montenegro) Gabriella Markoč
- (Montenegro) Marta Batinović
- (Montenegro) Jelena Despotović
- (Montenegro) Dijana Ujkić
- (Montenegro) Đurđina Malović
- (Montenegro) Ljubica Nenezić
- (Montenegro) Đurđina Jauković
- (Montenegro) Ema Alivodić
- (Montenegro) Majda Mehmedović
- (Montenegro) Jovanka Radičević
- (Montenegro) Marina Rajčić
- (Montenegro) Itana Grbić
- (Montenegro) Tatjana Brnović
- (Montenegro) Matea Pletikosić
- (Montenegro) Milena Raičević
- (Montenegro) Nikolina Vukčević
- (Montenegro) Ivona Pavićević
- (Montenegro) Anastasija Marsenić
- (Serbia) Sandra Kolaković
- (Serbia) Dragica Đurić
- (Serbia) Biljana Balać
- (Serbia) Danica Pavlov
- (Serbia) Tanja Tomanović
- (Serbia) Jelena Jovanović
- (Serbia) Zlata Paplacko
- (Serbia) Ljiljana Knežević
- (Serbia) Ana Vojčić
- (Serbia) Dragana Cvijić
- (Serbia) Željka Nikolić
- (Serbia) Sanja Vujović
- (Serbia) Andrea Lekić
- (Croatia) Iva Perica
- (Croatia) Dalija Erceg
- (Croatia) Sanela Knezović
- (Croatia) Dijana Jovetić
- (Croatia) Katarina Ježić
- (Croatia) Tihana Ambroš
- (Croatia) Lidija Horvat
- (Slovenia) Neli Irman
- (Slovenia) Barbara Lazović
- (North Macedonia) Dragana Ristova
- (North Macedonia) Elena Gjorgjievska
- (Russia) Natalya Cygankova
- (Russia) Natalya Anisimova
- (Russia) Larisa Kiselyova
- (Russia) Inna Mokhova
- (Russia) Nigina Saidova
- (Russia) Elena Dmitrieva
- (Russia) Valeriia Maslova
- (Russia) Liudmila Mochalina
- (Ukraine) Larysa Karlova
- (Ukraine) Lyudmyla Shevchenko
- (Ukraine) Nina Getsko
- (Ukraine) Tetyana Vorozhtsova
- (Ukraine) Svitlana Morozova
- (Ukraine) Hanna Burmystrova
- (Poland) Izabela Puchacz
- (Poland) Monika Marzec
- (Poland) Kinga Achruk
- (Romania) Gabriela Đukanović
- (Romania) Cristina Neagu
- (Romania) Cristina Laslo
- (Austria) Tatyana Dzhandzhgava
- (Austria) Tanja Logwin
- (Hungary) Irina Sirina
- (Hungary) Piroska Szamoránsky
- (Hungary) Noémi Háfra
- (Germany) Clara Woltering
- (Germany) Ann-Cathrin Giegerich
- (France) Claudine Mendy
- (France) Allison Pineau
- (France) Kalidiatou Niakaté
- (Denmark) Camilla Dalby
- (Spain) Darly Zoqbi
- (Norway) Emily Stang Sando
- (Brazil) Bárbara Arenhart
- (Brazil) Adriana Cardoso de Castro
- (South Korea) Park Chung Hee
- (Japan) Sakura Hauge
- (Sweden) Clara Monti Danielsson

== Head coach history ==
- (Montenegro) Pero Milošević
- (Croatia) Vinko Kandija
- (Russia) Aleksandr Panov
- (Montenegro) Nikola Petrović
- (Montenegro) Duško Milić
- (Serbia) Milorad Milatović
- (Slovenia) Tone Tiselj (2007–2008)
- (Hungary) Gyula Zsiga (2008–2010)
- (Montenegro) Dragan Adžić (2010–2020)
- (Montenegro) Bojana Popović (2020–present)
