= Tanja Logwin =

Austrian handball player (born 1974)

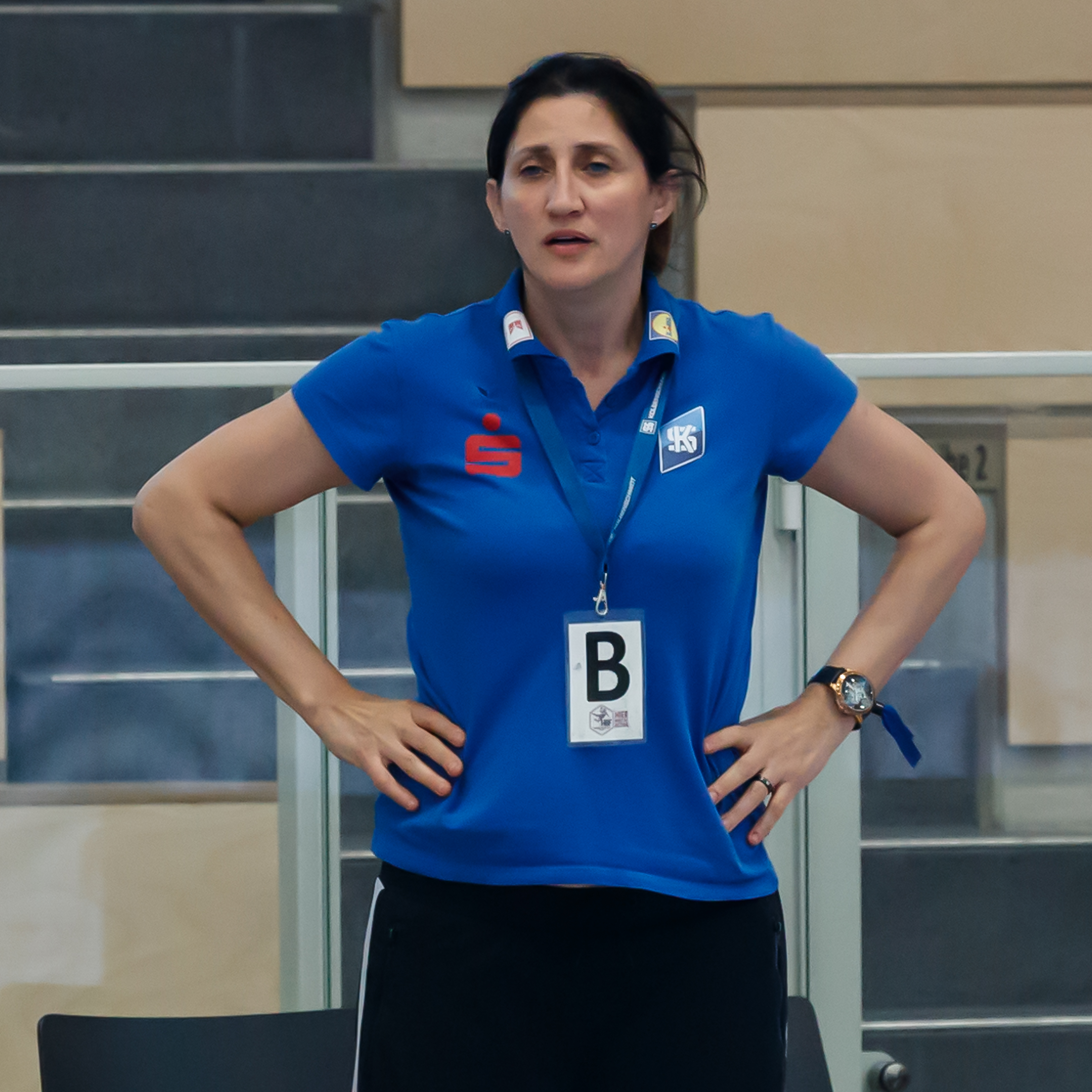

Personal information
- Full name: Tatyana Logwin
- Nickname: Tanja
- Nationality: Ukrainian; Austrian
- Born: 25 August 1974 (age 52) Zaporizhzhia, Ukrainian SSR, Soviet Union
- Height: 180 cm (71 in)

Sport
- Sport: Handball
- Position: Left back

Senior clubs
- Years: Team
- 1990–1996: HC Motor Zaporizhzhia
- 1996–1997: ŽRK Budućnost
- 1997–2003: Hypo Niederösterreich
- 2003–2004: Krim Ljubljana
- 2004–2006: Hypo Niederösterreich
- 2006–2009: Aalborg DH
- 2009: TST Hjørring
- 2009–2010: La Verde Vita Sassari
- 2010–2011: Team Vesthimmerland
- 2012: Vendsyssel Håndbold
National team
Years	Team	Apps	(Gls)
–	Austria	107	(820)

Teams managed
- 2011–2012: Vendsyssel Håndbold
- 2012: Aalborg DH
- 2017–2018: HL Buchholz 08-Rosengarten
- 2018: Neckarsulmer Sport-Union
- 2018–2020: SV Union Halle-Neustadt
- 2020–2023: Neckarsulmer Sport-Union

Tatyana "Tanja" Logwin (Ukrainian: Тетяна Логвін, born 25 August 1974) is a Ukrainian born Austrian female handball player, who was a member of the Austria women's national handball team. With 820 goals she has the 5th most goals ever on the Austrian national team.

== Playing career ==
Logwin played for HC Motor Zaporizhzhia until 1996, and then for ŽRK Budućnost for a season, before joining Hypo Niederösterreich in 1997. In her first season at the club, she won the EHF Champions League. The same year she optained Austrian citizenship and when represented them at the 1998 European Women's Handball Championship, where Austria finished 4th. A year later she won a bronze medal at the 1999 World Women's Handball Championship, which is the only World Championship medal Austria has ever won (as of 2026). The same season Hypo had reached the Champions League final once again, but lost to Hungarian Dunaferr SE.

She was also part of the team at the 2000 Summer Olympics, playing seven matches. The same year she won the Champions League for a second time.

In the summer of 2003 she signed for the Slovenian team RK Krim without noticing Hypo. In the 2003-04 Champions League she reached the final with Krim, but lost to Danish team Slagelse DT. She played for RK Krim until the winter break of the 2004-05 season, where she returned to Hypo NÖ.

From 2006 to 2009 she played for Danish club Aalborg DH. In 2009 she joined the Danish second tier team TST Hjørring. In November the same year she joined Italian La Verde Vita Sassari.

For the 2010-11 season she returned to Denmark to coach Team Vesthimmerland in the third tier. In 2012 she made a short comeback on the court for Team Vendsyssel. She left the team already in December and became a coach at Aalborg DH.

== Coaching career ==
In 2017 she became the head coach of the German Second Bundesliga club HL Buchholz 08-Rosengarten. in April 2018 she took over at Neckarsulmer Sport-Union. The following summer she became the coach for SV Union Halle-Neustadt.

In 2020 she returned to Neckarsulmer.

== Titles ==
- EHF Champions League:
  - Winner: 1998, 2000
  - Second place: 1999, 2004
- Yugoslav Championship
  - Winner: 1997
- Yugoslav Cup
  - Winner: 1997
- Austrian Championship:
  - Winner: 1998, 1999, 2000, 2001, 2002, 2003, 2005, 2006
- Austrian Cup:
  - Winner: 1998, 1999, 2000, 2001, 2002, 2003, 2005, 2006
- Slovenian Championship:
  - Winner: 2004, 2005
- Slovenian Cup:
  - Winner: 2004, 2005

== Private ==
Her daughter, Kristina is also a handballer, currently playing for VfL Oldenburg.
