= Bhawana Sharma =

Indian handball player

Bhawana Sharma (born 2003) is a handball player from Himachal Pradesh. She plays for the India women's National Handball team as centre back.

== Early life ==
Sharma is from Navgaon, Kunihar, Solan district, Himachal Pradesh, India. Her father, Hem Raj, is a farmer and also works as a car mechanic during the off season. She is the youngest of three sisters, all handball players. She started playing handball in Class 6. The eldest sister, Nidhi, a former Indian player, got a government job in sports quota and her other sister, Mithali is also in the Indian senior team. The three girls were spotted and trained initially by former Indian handball couple Snehalatha and Sachin Chaudhary. All three sisters represented India in the 2023 Asian Games at Hangzhou, China.

== Career ==
Sharma was part of the Indian senior when India made their debut in the 2022 IHF Women's Junior World Championship. India had two wins and finished 26th in the championship. Sharma finished as the third top scorer in the tournament with 58 goals, only four less than the top scorers Kim Molenaar and Charlotte Cholevova. Her average of 8.29 goals per game was also third in the competition. Earlier, she was part of the Indian team that won the Asian Women's Junior Handball Championship in 2022. The win helped India qualify for their IHF World Championship qualification ever.

In 2023, she was part of the Indian women's team at the Asian Games at Hangzhou, the People's Republic of China. This is the fifth Asian Games for the Indian women's team. They finished third in a tough group behind Japan and China and failed to advance.

In December 2024, she represented India in the Asian Women's Handball Championship 2024 at the Indira Gandhi Arena in New Delhi. She performed well to bag the 'Player of the March' honour. India finished sixth, their best ever result in the Asian event.

=== Domestic ===
In April 2022, Sharma was part of the Himachal Pradesh senior women's team that won the 50th Senior Women's National Handball Championship at the Saroornagar Indoor Stadium in Hyderabad under the aegis of the then Handball Federation of India. Sharma won the best player of the tournament award. Himachal Pradesh also won the Senior Nationals in 2021.
