= Lobov =

Lobov (Russian: Лобов) is a Russian masculine surname, its feminine counterpart is Lobova. The surname is derived from the word лоб (lob, meaning "forehead") and may refer to:

- Artem Lobov (born 1986), Russian mixed martial artist
- Konstantin Lobov (born 1981), Russian football player
- Natalia Lobova (born 1986), Russian sprint canoer
- Nina Lobova (born 1957), Ukrainian handball player
- Oleg Lobov (1937–2018), Russian politician
- Semyon Lobov (admiral) (1913–1977), Soviet Navy Admiral
