= Clara Petersson Bergsten =

Swedish handball player (born 2002)

Personal information
- Nationality: Swedish
- Born: 22 May 2002 (age 24) Sollentuna, Sweden
- Height: 163 cm (64 in)

Sport
- Sport: Handball
- Position: Right wing
- Current club: Skuru IK
- Number: 10

Youth career
- Years: Team
- –: Sollentuna HK

Senior clubs
- Years: Team
- 2019–2021: Skånela IF
- 2021–: Skuru IK
National team
Years	Team	Apps	(Gls)
2022–	Sweden	20	(34)
- Updated on 27 October 2025

Clara Petersson Bergsten (born 28 May 2002) is a Swedish handball player for Skuru IK and the Swedish national team.

== Career ==
Petersson Bergsten started playing handball at her local club Sollentuna HK. In 2019 she joined Skånela IF, where she played for 2 years before Joining Skuru IK. Here she won the Swedish Handball Cup in 2022.

She participated in the 2022 IHF Women's U20 Handball World Championship, where Sweden finished 4th. At this occasion, she was selected for the tournament all-star team. In April 2022 she made her debut for the Swedish senior national team in a European Championship qualification match against Turkey. She was included in the brutto team for the 2022 European Women's Handball Championship, but did not make the final squad. When Nina Dano was injured in the second match of the tournament, Petersson Bergsten was called up as the replacement.
