= Biljana Pavićević (handballer) =

Montenegrin handball player (born 1988)

Biljana Pavićević Novović
Personal information
- Nationality: Montenegrin
- Born: 12 May 1988 (age 38) Podgorica, SR Montenegro, SFR Yugoslavia
- Height: 1.69 m (5 ft 7 in)

Sport
- Sport: Handball
- Position: Left wing
- Current club: Retired
- Number: 88

Senior clubs
- Years: Team
- 2005-2017: ŽRK Budućnost Podgorica
National team
Years	Team	Apps	(Gls)
–	Montenegro	51	(71)
Medal record
European Championship
Gold medal – first place	2012 Serbia	Team

Biljana Novović née Pavićević, (born 12 May 1988) is a former Montenegrin handball player for ŽRK Budućnost Podgorica and the Montenegrin national team.

She was part of the Montenegrin team that won their first ever international title at the 2012 European Women's Handball Championship.

She played her entire career at ŽRK Budućnost Podgorica. With Buducnost she won EHF Champions League in 2015 and EHF Cup Winners' Cup in 2010. With a lot of injures and health issues she finished her career at the age of 29 in 2017.
