= 2022 North America and Caribbean Women's Junior Handball Championship =

Women's Junior Handball Championship qualifier

Tournament details
- Host country: Mexico
- Venue(s): 1 (in 1 host city)
- Dates: 4–8 April
- Teams: 4 (from 1 confederation)

Final positions
- Champions: Mexico
- Runner-up: United States
- Third place: Canada
- Fourth place: Puerto Rico

Tournament statistics
- Matches played: 8
- Goals scored: 403 (50.38 per match)

The 2022 North America and Caribbean Women's Junior Handball Championship was the first edition of the tournament, it took place in Mexico City, Mexico, from 4 to 8 April 2022. It acted as the North America and Caribbean qualifying tournament for the 2022 Women's Junior World Handball Championship.

== Preliminary round ==
=== Standings ===
Pos	Team	Pld	W	D	L	GF	GA	GD	Pts	Qualification
1	Mexico (H)	3	3	0	0	111	46	+65	6	Final and 2022 Junior World Championship
2	United States	3	2	0	1	71	62	+9	4	Final and 2022 Junior World Championship
3	Canada	3	1	0	2	71	68	+3	2	Third place game
4	Puerto Rico	3	0	0	3	41	118	−77	0	Third place game

Source: USATH
Rules for classification: 1) Points; 2) Head-to-head points; 3) Head-to-head goal difference; 4) Head-to-head goals scored; 5) Goal difference; 6) Goals scored; 7) Draw.
(H) Hosts

=== Results ===
All times are local (UTC–5).

4 April 2022; 16:00	Canada	22−25	United States	Mexican Olympic Training Center, Mexico City; Referees: Blanco & Santillarez
4 April 2022; 16:00	Blaise 5	(15−11)	Licea, Nesper 7	Mexican Olympic Training Center, Mexico City; Referees: Blanco & Santillarez
4 April 2022; 16:00	1× (yellow card) 6× (suspension)	Report	1× (yellow card) 8× (suspension)	Mexican Olympic Training Center, Mexico City; Referees: Blanco & Santillarez

4 April 2022; 18:00	Puerto Rico	15−54	Mexico	Mexican Olympic Training Center, Mexico City; Referees: Marques, Rafael / Poulet, Kevin (USA)
4 April 2022; 18:00		(8−28)		Mexican Olympic Training Center, Mexico City; Referees: Marques, Rafael / Poulet, Kevin (USA)

5 April 2022; 16:00	Puerto Rico	12−32	Canada	Mexican Olympic Training Center, Mexico City
5 April 2022; 16:00		(5−13)		Mexican Olympic Training Center, Mexico City

5 April 2022; 18:00	Mexico	26−14	United States	Mexican Olympic Training Center, Mexico City
5 April 2022; 18:00	Legia 6	(11−6)	Faulkner 3	Mexican Olympic Training Center, Mexico City

6 April 2022; 16:00	United States	32−14	Puerto Rico	Mexican Olympic Training Center, Mexico City
6 April 2022; 16:00		(18−5)		Mexican Olympic Training Center, Mexico City

6 April 2022; 18:00	Canada	17−31	Mexico	Mexican Olympic Training Center, Mexico City; Referees: Marques, Rafael / Poulet, Kevin (USA)
6 April 2022; 18:00		(10−16)		Mexican Olympic Training Center, Mexico City; Referees: Marques, Rafael / Poulet, Kevin (USA)

== Knockout stage ==
=== Third place game ===
8 April 2022; 16:00	Canada	34−16	Puerto Rico	Mexican Olympic Training Center, Mexico City
8 April 2022; 16:00		(15−8)		Mexican Olympic Training Center, Mexico City

=== Final ===
8 April 2022; 18:00	Mexico	30−29	United States	Mexican Olympic Training Center, Mexico City
8 April 2022; 18:00		(14−14)		Mexican Olympic Training Center, Mexico City

== See also ==
- Nor.Ca. Women's Handball Championship
