= Clara Monti Danielsson =

Swedish handball player (born 1992)

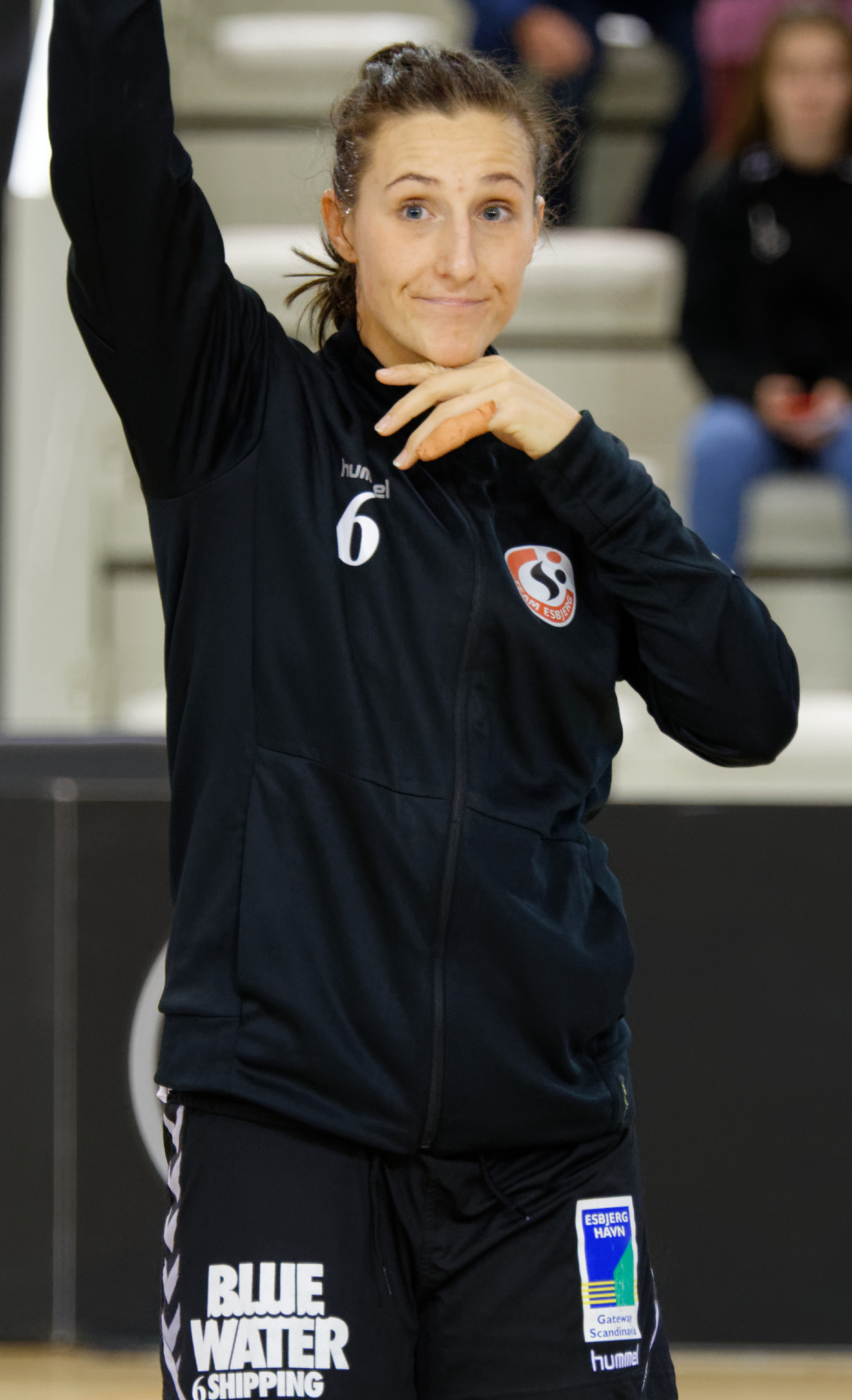

Personal information
- Nationality: Swedish
- Born: 30 January 1992 (age 34) Lund, Sweden
- Height: 1.76 m (5 ft 9 in)

Sport
- Sport: Handball
- Position: Pivot
- Current club: ŽRK Budućnost
- Number: 6

Youth career
- Years: Team
- -2008: Farmen HK
- 2008-2011: Lugi HF

Senior clubs
- Years: Team
- 2011–2015: Lugi HF
- 2015–2018: Randers HK
- 2018–2020: Team Esbjerg
- 2020–2021: Borussia Dortmund Handball
- 2021–2024: Chambray Touraine Handball
- 2024-2025: ŽRK Budućnost
National team
Years	Team	Apps	(Gls)
2013–	Sweden	8	(1)
Medal record
Women's handball
Representing Sweden
Youth World Championship
Gold medal – first place	2010 Dominican Republic
Gold medal – first place	2012 Czech Republic
- Updated on 5 juni 2022

Clara Monti Danielsson (born 30 January 1992) is a Swedish handball player. She currently plays for ŽRK Budućnost Podgorica and the Sweden women's national handball team.

== Career ==
Clara Monti Danielsson started playing handball in Lugi HF and represented the parent club until 2015. Clara Monti Danielsson is a strong defensive player, fast in the legs, reads the game and sacrifices herself for the team. For several years she formed a center lock in Lugi with Anna Lagerquist. In 2012 and 2013, she was present when the club reached the Swedish Championship final, but both ended in losses. In 2015, she moved to Danish Randers HK.

After three years in Randers, she changed club to Team Esbjerg in 2018. Already the first year offered a Danish league title with Team Esbjerg. In the EHF Cup 2019, Esbjerg reached the final but was defeated by Siofok from Hungary. After her second Danish championship gold 2020, Monti Danielsson left Team Esbjerg for German Borussia Dortmund. After playing one season and winning the German championship in 2021, she leaves the club for French Chambray Touraine.

=== National team ===
The national team career began early in the junior and youth national teams. Clara Monti Danielsson belonged to the golden generation 1992/1993 who took JVM gold in 2010 and repeated the feat in 2012 with U20 WC gold. She has only played 8 A-national matches and scored 1 goal. She was selected in the gross squad for the home European Championship 2016 but was rejected in favor of former clubmate Anna Lagerquist. In 2022 she got the chance again in the national team in the European Championship qualifier against Serbia after not playing in the national team for five years.

== Extern sites ==
- Clara Monti Danielsson on Swedish National Teams web
- Clara Monti dhdb.hyldgaard-jensen.dk web
