= Andrijana Popović =

Montenegrin handball player (born 2002)

Personal information
- Full name: Andrijana Popović
- Nationality: Montenegrin
- Born: 20 April 2002 (age 24) Nikšić, Montenegro, FR Yugoslavia
- Height: 1.85 m (6 ft 1 in)

Sport
- Sport: Handball
- Position: Pivot
- Current club: ŽRK Budućnost
- Number: 13

Senior clubs
- Years: Team
- 2019-2025: ŽRK Budućnost
National team
Years	Team	Apps	(Gls)
2020-	Montenegro	25	(3)
Medal record
European Championship
Bronze medal – third place	2022 Slovenia/North Macedonia/Montenegro

Andrijana Popović (born 20 April 2002) is a Montenegrin handball player for ŽRK Budućnost Podgorica and the Montenegrin national team.

She was selected as part of the Montenegrin 35-player squad for the 2020 European Women's Handball Championship.
