= Maria Wierzba =

Danish handball player (born 2002)

Personal information
- Full name: Maria Berger Wierzba
- Nationality: Danish
- Born: 1 May 2002 (age 24) Aarhus, Denmark
- Height: 1.70 m (5 ft 7 in)

Sport
- Sport: Handball
- Position: Centre back
- Current club: Paris 92
- Number: 3

Youth career
- Years: Team
- 2018–2020: HEI/VRI
- 2020–2021: Aarhus United

Senior clubs
- Years: Team
- 2020–2022: Aarhus United
- 2022–2023: Toulon Saint-Cyr Var Handball
- 2023–2025: Ringkøbing Håndbold
- 2025–2026: Paris 92
- 2026–: Ikast Håndbold

Maria Berger Wierzba (born 1 May 2002) is a Danish handball player for Paris 92 in the LFH Division 1 Féminine. In February 2022, she signed an contract with Toulon Saint-Cyr Var Handball with immediate effect.

She has represented the Danish national youth and junior team, where she participated at the 2019 European Women's U-17 Handball Championship, 2021 European Women's U-19 Handball Championship and 2022 IHF Women's U20 Handball World Championship in Slovenia.

On 14 January 2026, Wierzba signed with Ikast Håndbold for the 2026–27 season.

== Personal life ==
She is also the little sister of Anna Wierzba, who also plays professional handball. They have played together at both Aarhus and Toulon.
