= Blanka Kajdon =

Hungarian handball player (born 2002)

Personal information
- Nationality: Hungarian
- Born: 12 June 2002 (age 24) Veszprém, Hungary
- Height: 1.71 m (5 ft 7 in)

Sport
- Sport: Handball
- Position: Centre back
- Current club: BSV Sachsen Zwickau
- Number: 19

Youth career
- Years: Team
- 2014–2015: DSE Veszprém
- 2015–2016: Éles KISE

Senior clubs
- Years: Team
- 2016–2017: (Hungary) BDSE Nemesvámos
- 2017–2020: (Hungary) NEKA
- 2020–2021: (Hungary) Boglári Akadémia-SZISE
- 2021–2022: (Hungary) Vasas SC
- 2022–2023: (Hungary) Siófok KC
- 2023–2024: (Norway) Molde Elite
- 2024–2025: (Germany) BSV Sachsen Zwickau
- 2025–: (Hungary) Váci NKSE
National team
Years	Team	Apps	(Gls)
2025–	Hungary	1	(0)
Medal record
Junior European Championship
Gold medal – first place	2021 Slovenia
Youth European Championship
Gold medal – first place	2019 Slovenia
European Women's U-16 Handball Championship
Gold medal – first place	2018 Sweden
Junior World Championship
Silver medal – second place	2022 Slovenia

Blanka Kajdon (born 12 June 2002) is a Hungarian handballer for BSV Sachsen Zwickau and the Hungarian national team.

== Career ==
=== Club ===
Blanka started her career in 2014 in the DSE Veszprém team. In 2015, he signed for Éles KISE. In 2016, he transferred to BDSE Nemesvámos, where he already played for the senior team in the Nemzeti Bajnokság II. In the summer of 2017, he joined the National Handball Academy (NEKA) team. From 2018, in addition to the youth championship, he also played a role in the adult team in the Nemzeti Bajnokság I/B.

In the spring of 2020, Szent István SE (SZISE) and the National Handball Academy (NEKA) entered into a strategic cooperation, according to which they will start a joint team in the women's handball Nemzeti Bajnokság I in the 2020/21 season. In Nemzeti Bajnokság I, the team started as Boglári Akadémia-SZISE. Blanka scored 82 goals in 22 games in the 2020/21 season, her first top-flight season. At the end of the season, the team was relegated from the first division, but Luca was signed by Vasas SC. Blanka scored 143 goals in 26 games in the 2021/22 season. At the end of the season, the team was relegated from the first division, but Blanka was signed by Siófok KC, the starting EHF European League team.

She made her international cup debut here in the 2022/23 season: she scored 29 goals in 12 matches in the EHF European League. In the summer of 2023, she moved to the Norwegian first division team Molde Elite. Here in the EHF European League she scored 7 goals in 4 matches. He signed a contract with the French first division club Neptunes de Nantes from the 2024/25 season. However, as the club filed for insolvency in the summer of 2024, he moved to the German BSV Sachsen Zwickau. In April 2025, it was announced that she would return to Hungary and continue her career with the Váci NKSE team from the summer.

=== National team ===
In June 2018, she won a gold medal with the Hungarian women's youth handball team at the Open U16 European Championship in Sweden. In the final, the Hungarian team won overtime against the French 31–30. In August 2019, she became Youth European Championship with the women's youth handball team after the Hungary women's national youth handball team defeated the Sweden women's national youth handball team 28–24 in the final and Blanka was chosen as the most valuable player in the tournament. In July 2021, he won a gold medal at the Junior European Championship held in Slovenia after the Hungary women's national junior handball team defeated the Russia women's national junior handball team 31–22 in the final and Blanka was chosen as the most valuable player in the tournament. In July 2022, she won a silver medal with the national team at the Junior World Championship held in Slovenia, after the Hungary women's national junior handball team lost to the Norway women's national junior handball team 31–29 in the final and Blanka was also voted the best center back of the tournament.

She was included in the preliminary squad of the 2023 World Women's Handball Championship, but in the end he will not become a member of the final squad. She was included in the preliminary squad of the 2024 European Women's Handball Championship, but in the end he will not become a member of the final squad. She made her debut for the Hungarian women's adult national team in Tatabánya in April 2025 in a warm-up match against the Brazilian national team. She was included in the preliminary squad of the 2025 World Women's Handball Championship, but in the end he will not become a member of the final squad.

== Honours ==
=== National team ===
- Junior European Championship:
  - Gold: 2021
- Youth European Championship:
  - Gold: 2019
- European Women's U-16 Handball Championship:
  - Gold: 2018
- Junior World Championship:
  - Silver: 2022

=== Club ===
NEKA

- Nemzeti Bajnokság I/B
  - Silver: 2019

=== Individual ===
- Hungarian Youth Handballer of the Year: 2019, 2021
- Most Valuable Player (MVP) in the Youth European Championship: 2019
- Most Valuable Player (MVP) in the Junior European Championship: 2021
- All-Star Centre Back of the Junior World Championship: 2022
