= Anna Wierzba =

Danish handball player (born 2000)

Personal information
- Full name: Anna Berger Wierzba
- Nationality: Danish
- Born: 19 July 2000 (age 26) Aarhus, Denmark
- Height: 1.74 m (5 ft 9 in)

Sport
- Sport: Handball
- Position: Centre back
- Current club: Toulon
- Number: 4

Senior clubs
- Years: Team
- 2017-2018: AGF Håndbold
- 2018-2019: Aarhus United
- 2019-2020: Skanderborg Håndbold
- 2020-: Toulon Handball

Anna Wierzba (born 19 July 2000) is a Danish handball player for Toulon Saint-Cyr Var Handball and the Danish national junior team.

She also represented Denmark in the 2017 European Women's U-17 Handball Championship, 2018 Women's Youth World Handball Championship, and in the 2019 Women's Junior European Handball Championship, placing 6th all three times.

She has previously played for the AGF Håndbold, Aarhus United and Skanderborg Håndbold.

Her sister Maria Wierzba is also a handball player, and they have played together at both Aarhus and Toulon.
