= Armelle Attingré =

Handball player (born 1989)

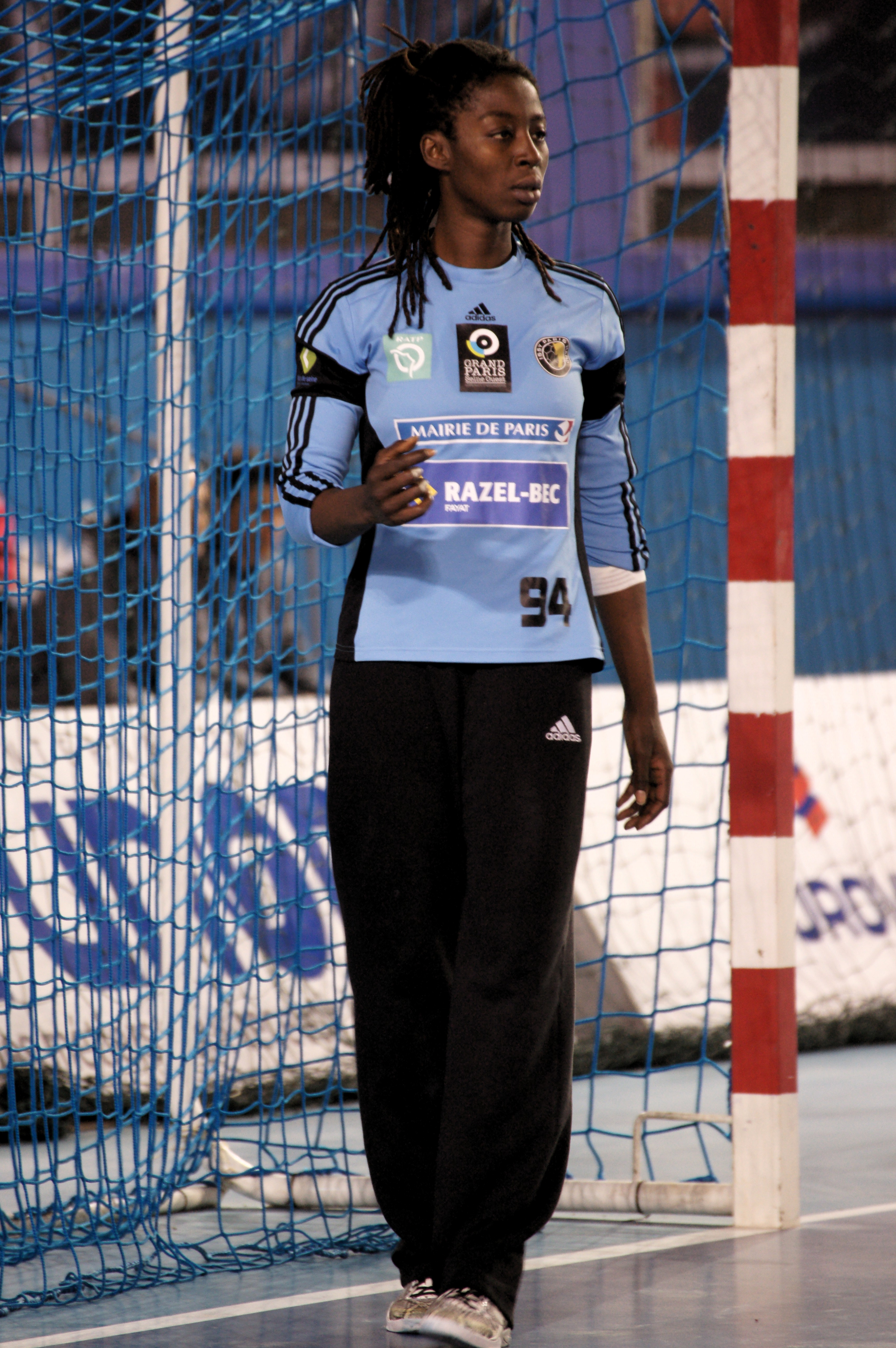

Personal information
- Nationality: Ivorian, French, Montenegrin
- Born: 15 January 1989 (age 37) Kadjokro, Ivory Coast
- Height: 1.74 m (5 ft 9 in)

Sport
- Country: France
- Sport: Handball
- Position: Goalkeeper
- Current club: ŽRK Budućnost Podgorica
- Number: 12

Senior clubs
- Years: Team
- 2006–2009: Fleury Loiret Handball
- 2009–2016: Paris 92
- 2016–2018: Yenimahalle Bld. SK
- 2018–2019: Nantes Atlantique Handball
- 2019–2020: Alba Fehérvár KC
- 2020–: ŽRK Budućnost Podgorica
National team
Years	Team	Apps	(Gls)
2010–2014	France	16	(0)
2024–	Montenegro	29	(1)

Armelle Attingré (born 15 January 1989) is a women's professional handball player who plays as a goalkeeper for Montenegin club ŽRK Budućnost. Born in Ivory Coast, she internationally represented France until 2014 before deciding to play for Montenegro in 2024.

Attingré is also a beach handball player.

== Individual awards ==
- French Championship Best Goalkeeper: 2013, 2014
