= Ivona Pavićević =

Montenegrin handball player (born 1996)

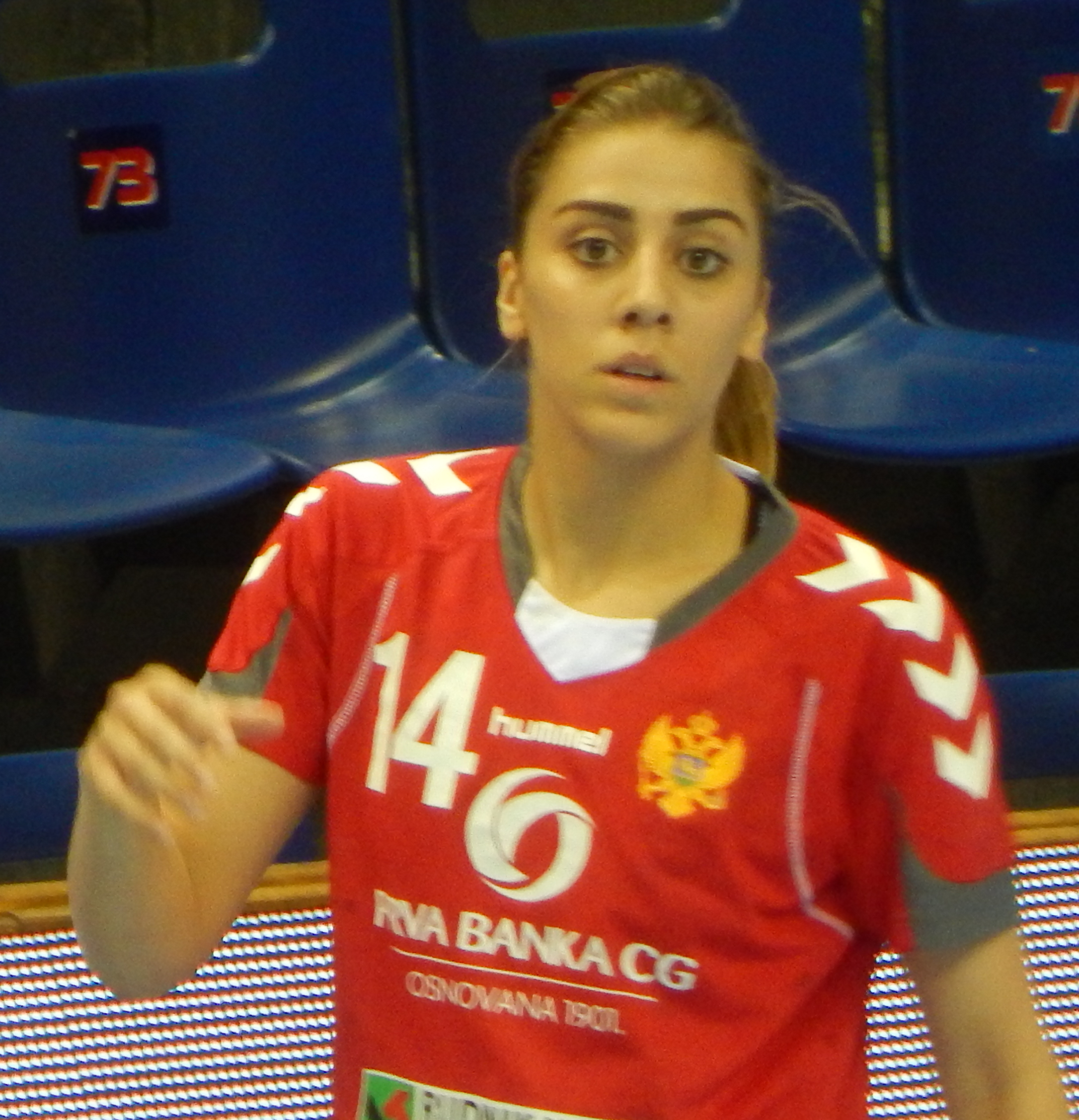

Personal information
- Nationality: Montenegrin
- Born: 21 April 1996 (age 30) Podgorica, Montenegro, FR Yugoslavia
- Height: 1.67 m (5 ft 6 in)

Sport
- Sport: Handball
- Position: Left wing
- Current club: SCM Craiova
- Number: 91

Senior clubs
- Years: Team
- 2013–2015: ŽRK Danilovgrad
- 2015–2019: ŽRK Budućnost
- 2019: Corona Brașov
- 2020–2025: ŽRK Budućnost
- 2025: SCM Craiova
National team
Years	Team	Apps	(Gls)
2015–2026	Montenegro	105	(151)
Medal record
European Championship
Bronze medal – third place	2022 Slovenia/North Macedonia/Montenegro
Mediterranean Games
Silver medal – second place	2018 Tarragona	Team
- Updated on 28 October 2025

Ivona Pavićević (born 21 April 1996) is a Montenegrin handball player for SCM Craiova and the Montenegrin national team.

In 2019 she was treated by intravenous laser therapy following an injury, a treatment method not permitted by WADA, and was therefore banned for 16 months.

== International honours ==
- EHF Champions League:
  - Semifinalist: 2016, 2017
