= Nina Bulatović =

Montenegrin handballer (born 1996)

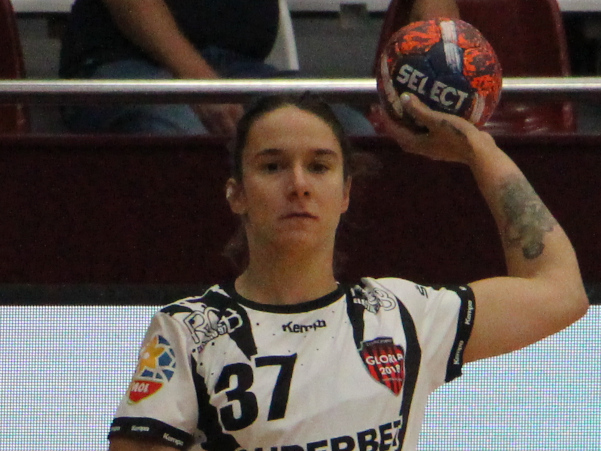

Personal information
- Nationality: Montenegrin
- Born: 9 December 1996 (age 29) Cetinje, Montenegro, FR Yugoslavia
- Height: 1.71 m (5 ft 7 in)

Sport
- Sport: Handball
- Position: Right wing
- Current club: ŽRK Budućnost Podgorica
- Number: 37
National team
Years	Team	Apps	(Gls)
2021–	Montenegro	47	(69)
Medal record
European Championship
Bronze medal – third place	2022 Slovenia/North Macedonia/Montenegro

Nina Bulatović (born 9 December 1996) is a Montenegrin handballer for ŽRK Budućnost Podgorica and the Montenegrin national team.

She represented Montenegro at the 2022 European Women's Handball Championshipwhere she won the bronze medal. On 13 June 2023 she was transferred by Gloria Bistrița from ŽRK Budućnost Podgorica.
