= Dragana Pešić =

Yugoslav handball player

Personal information
- Nationality: Yugoslav
- Born: 10 December 1963 (age 62) Titograd SFRY

Sport
- Sport: Handball

Dragana Pešić - Belojević, (born 10 December 1963) in Titograd, is a Yugoslav handball player. She competed in the women's tournament at the 1988 Summer Olympics.
