= Hannah Vuljak =

Croatian handballer (born 2002)

Personal information
- Nationality: Croatian
- Born: 18 August 2002 (age 24) Koprivnica, Croatia
- Height: 1.82 m (6 ft 0 in)

Sport
- Sport: Handball
- Position: Right back
- Current club: ŽRK Budućnost Podgorica
- Number: 25

Senior clubs
- Years: Team
- –2026: RK Podravka Koprivnica
- 2026–: ŽRK Budućnost Podgorica
National team
| Years | Team | Apps | (Gls) |
| 2025– | Croatia | 21 | (20) |
- Updated on 29 October 2026

Hannah Vuljak (born 18 August 2002) is a Croatian handballer for ŽRK Budućnost Podgorica and the Croatian national team.

She represented Croatia at the 2025 World Women's Handball Championship.
