= Nađa Kadović =

Montenegrin handball player (born 2003)

Personal information
- Full name: Nađa Kadović
- Nationality: Montenegrin
- Born: 28 August 2003 (age 23) Podgorica, Montenegro
- Height: 1.80 m (5 ft 11 in)

Sport
- Sport: Handball
- Position: Left wing
- Current club: ŽRK Budućnost
- Number: 88

Senior clubs
- Years: Team
- 2019-: ŽRK Budućnost
National team
Years	Team	Apps	(Gls)
2020-	Montenegro	10	(11)
Medal record
European Championship
Bronze medal – third place	2022 Slovenia/North Macedonia/Montenegro

Nađa Kadović (born 28 August 2003) is a Montenegrin handball player for ŽRK Budućnost Podgorica and the Montenegrin national team.

She was selected as part of the Montenegrin 35-player squad for the 2020 European Women's Handball Championship.
