= Kim Molenaar =

Dutch handball player (born 2002)

Personal information
- Full name: Catharina Agatha Anna Molenaar
- Nationality: Dutch
- Born: 28 April 2002 (age 24) Den Helder, Netherlands
- Height: 178 cm (70 in)

Sport
- Sport: Handball
- Position: Left back
- Current club: IK Sävehof
- Number: 7

Senior clubs
- Years: Team
- –2022: VOC Amsterdam
- 2022–2025: København Håndbold
- 2025–: IK Sävehof
National team
Years	Team	Apps	(Gls)
2022–	Netherlands	39	(27)
- Updated on 12 July 2025

Kim Molenaar (born 28 April 2002) is a Dutch handballer who plays for Swedish side IK Sävehof. She represented Netherlands at the 2024 Summer Olympics.

Until 2022 she played for VOC Amsterdam. Then she joined Danish side København Håndbold. In 2025 she joined IK Sävehof.

She was joint top scorer at the 2022 IHF Women's U20 Handball World Championship with 62 goals together with Czechia's Charlotte Cholevová, where she also won the MVP award.
