= Dolores García =

Dolores García may refer to:

- Dolores García-Hierro (born 1958), Spanish politician
- Dolores Balderamos-García, Belizean lawyer, politician, activist, broadcaster and author
- Dolores Lewis Garcia (born 1938), Native American potter
- Dolores Guadalupe García Escamilla (c. 1966–2005), Mexican crime reporter and anchorwoman
