= Nina Lobova =

Soviet handball player (born 1957)

Personal information
- Full name: Nina Romanivna Getsko
- Nationality: Ukrainian
- Born: 20 July 1957 (age 69) Zestaponi, USSR
- Height: 1.79 m (5 ft 10 in)

Sport
- Sport: Handball
- Position: Goalkeeper

Senior clubs
- Years: Team
- 1970-1989: Kolos Berehowe
- 1989-1991: Vasas SC
- 1991-1994: UMF Stjarnan
- 1994-1998: ŽRK Budućnost Podgorica
National team
- Years: Team
- –: Soviet Union
Medal record
Representing the Soviet Union
Women's Handball
Gold medal – first place	1976 Montreal	Team
World Championship
Gold medal – first place	1982 Hungary	Team

Nina Romanivna Getsko, née Lobova (Ukrainian: Ніна Романівна Гецко); born July 20, 1957, is a former Soviet/Ukrainian handball player who competed in the 1976 Summer Olympics.

In 1976 she won the gold medal with the Soviet team. She played all five matches.
