= Golovec Hall =

Indoor sporting arena located in Celje, Slovenia

Coordinates: 46°14′24.3″N 15°16′21.8″E

- Interactive map of Golovec Hall
- Full name: Športna dvorana Golovec
- Location: Celje, Slovenia
- Operator: ZPO Celje d.o.o.
- Capacity: 3,200
- Surface: parquet

Construction
- Opened: 1976

Tenant
- ŽRK Z'dežele (handball)

Golovec Hall (Slovene: Dvorana Golovec) is an indoor sporting arena located in Celje, Slovenia. The arena has between 2,500 and 3,200 fixed seats, depending on the seating configuration, and an area of 5,000 square metres. It hosts the home games of ŽRK Z'dežele handball club.

Various events take place throughout the year: concerts, major congresses and spring prom-dances.
