= Sia Tolno =

Guinean singer, composer (born 1975)

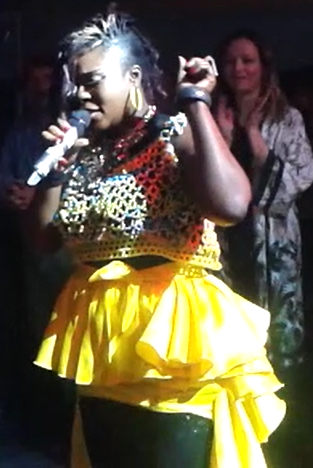
Sia Tolno (2019) in Quebec

Sia Tolno (born 21 February 1975), is a Guinean singer and composer. She lives in Île-de-France.

== Life and career ==
Sia Tolno was born on 21 February 1975, in Gueckedou, Guinea, a village in the forest region of southeast Guinea near Sierra Leone and Liberia, with the Kissi people. She grew up in Freetown, the capital of Sierra Leone, where her father taught French.

Her music incorporates blues, funk, R & B, soul, and Afrobeat. Her repertoire also includes performing with the Afro Dead, and covering the music of the Grateful Dead with an African interpretation. In 2011, she was awarded the Prix decouvertes RFI.

After the war began in Sierra Leone, she relocated to Conakry, Guinea, singing in bars and nightclubs in the capital. In addition to Afrobeat, she sang Western music of Whitney Houston, Nina Simone, Mariah Carey, Gloria Estafan, and Edith Piaf. In 2002, she released her first album, La Voix de la forêt . She worked with Guinean musicians in early albums, Eh Sanga and My Life, which one the 2011 RFI Prize. She worked with Kante Manfila, a former member of Salif Keita's Les Ambassadeurs and also Mamadou Camara who played guitar with Kaloum Star Orchestra.

Her vocals have been likened to musicians and activists such as Miriam Makeba from South Africa, and also to Nigeria's Fela Kuti.
