= Serbia and Montenegro Women's Handball Championship =

The Serbia and Montenegro Women's Handball Championship was the premier championship for women's handball clubs in FR Yugoslavia (between 1992 and 2003) and Serbia and Montenegro (between 2003 and 2006), before the split of the country. It succeeded Yugoslav Championship after 1992–1993 season. The last season was disputed in 2005–2006.

All the championships were won by ŽRK Budućnost Podgorica (14 tiles).

Today, the teams play in one of the following championships:

- Montenegrin First League
- Serbian First League

== Winners ==
Season	Champion	Runner-up	Third place
FR Yugoslavia Championship
1992–1993	Budućnost Podgorica	Radnički Belgrade	ORK Belgrade
1993–1994	Budućnost Podgorica	Voždovac Belgrade	ŽRK Sombor
1994–1995	Budućnost Podgorica	Voždovac Belgrade	Radnički Belgrade
1995–1996	Budućnost Podgorica	Voždovac Belgrade	ŽRK Sombor
1996–1997	Budućnost Podgorica	Napredak Kruševac	ŽRK Sombor
1997–1998	Budućnost Podgorica	ŽRK Sombor	Napredak Kruševac
1998–1999	Budućnost Podgorica	?	?
1999–2000	Budućnost Podgorica	Radnički Belgrade	Slodes Belgrade
2000–2001	Budućnost Podgorica	?	?
2001–2002	Budućnost Podgorica	?	?
Serbia and Montenegro Championship
2002–2003	Budućnost Podgorica	DIN Niš	?
2003–2004	Budućnost Podgorica	DIN Niš	?
2004–2005	Budućnost Podgorica	ŽRK Knjaz Miloš	DIN Niš
2005–2006	Budućnost Podgorica	?	?

== See also ==
- Handball League of Serbia
