= Charlotte Cholevová =

Czech handball player

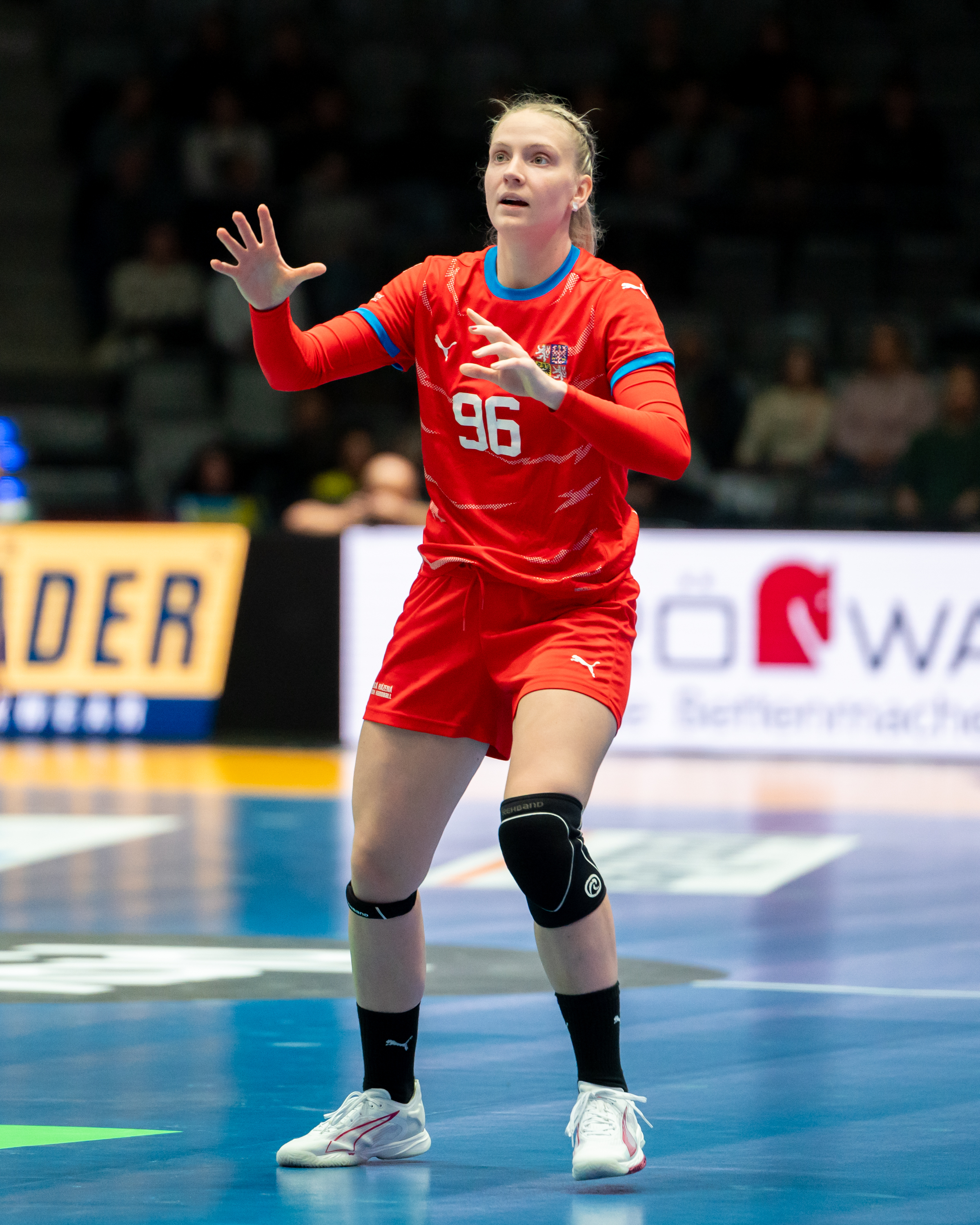

Personal information
- Nationality: Czech
- Born: 29 July 2002 (age 24) Ostrava, Czech Republic
- Height: 1.73 m (5 ft 8 in)

Sport
- Sport: Handball
- Position: Left back
- Current club: TuS Metzingen
- Number: 96

Senior clubs
- Years: Team
- –2023: DHK Baník Most
- 2023–2024: Brest Bretagne Handball
- 2024–2025: SCM Râmnicu Vâlcea
- 2025–: TuS Metzingen
National team
Years	Team	Apps	(Gls)
2021–	Czech Republic	57	(254)
- Updated on 29 October 2025

Charlotte Cholevová (born 29 July 2002) is a Czech handballer for Romanian league club TuS Metzingen and the Czech national team.

== Club career ==
She won the Czech championship twice in 2021 and 2022 and the Czech cup twice in 2022 and 2023 with DHK Baník Most. In summer 2023 she moved to French team Brest Bretagne Handball where she only played until the end of the calendar year before moving to Romanian club SCM Râmnicu Vâlcea. In 2025 she joined German team TuS Metzingen.

== National team ==
At the 2022 IHF Women's U20 Handball World Championship she was the joint topscorer together with Netherlands' Kim Molenaar with 62 goals. Czechia finished 11th at the tournament.

She made her debut for the Czech senior team in November 2021. Immediately afterwards she participated at the 2021 World Women's Handball Championship in Spain, placing 19th. Cholevova scored 11 goals in 6 games.

At the 2023 World Women's Handball Championship she finished 8th with the Czech national team. During the tournament she scored 41 goals in 9 matches.

== Achievements ==
- Czech First Division:
  - Winner: 2021, 2022
