= 2022–23 Women's EHF Champions League group stage =

The 2022–23 Women's EHF Champions League group stage was played between 10 September 2022 and 12 February 2023 to determine the twelve teams advancing to the knockout stage of the 2022–23 Women's EHF Champions League.

== Draw ==
The draw was held on 1 July 2022 in Vienna, Austria.

=== Seeding ===
The composition of the seeding pots for the group stage draw was announced on 28 June 2022. From each pot, two teams were drawn into Group A and the other two in Group B. Teams from the same national association could not be drawn into the same group.

Pot 1	Pot 2	Pot 3	Pot 4
(Norway) Vipers Kristiansand (Hungary) Győri Audi ETO KC (France) Metz Handball (Denmark) Odense Håndbold	(Romania) CS Rapid București (Montenegro) WHC Budućnost BEMAX (Slovenia) RK Krim Mercator (Germany) SG BBM Bietigheim	(Norway) Storhamar Håndball Elite (Hungary) FTC-Rail Cargo Hungaria (France) Brest Bretagne Handball (Denmark) Team Esbjerg	(Czech Republic) DHK Baník Most (Croatia) RK Lokomotiva Zagreb (Turkey) Kastamonu Bld. GSK (Romania) CSM București

== Format ==
In each group, teams played against each other in a double round-robin format, with home and away matches.

== Tiebreakers ==
In the group stage, teams were ranked according to points (2 points for a win, 1 point for a draw, 0 points for a loss). After completion of the group stage, if two or more teams had the same number of points, the ranking is determined as follows:

1. Highest number of points in matches between the teams directly involved;
2. Superior goal difference in matches between the teams directly involved;
3. Highest number of goals scored in matches between the teams directly involved;
4. Superior goal difference in all matches of the group;
5. Highest number of plus goals in all matches of the group;

If the ranking of one of these teams is determined, the above criteria are consecutively followed until the ranking of all teams is determined. If no ranking can be determined, a decision shall be obtained by EHF through drawing of lots.

== Groups ==
The matchdays were 10–11 September, 17–18 September, 24–25 September, 8–9 October, 15–16 October, 22–23 October, 3–4 December, 10–11 December, 17–18 December 2022, 7–8 January, 14–15 January, 21–22 January, 4–5 February and 11–12 February 2023.

Times until 29 October 2022 are UTC+2, from 30 October 2022 on UTC+1.

=== Group A ===
Pos	Team	Pld	W	D	L	GF	GA	GD	Pts	Qualification
1	(Norway) Vipers Kristiansand	14	11	1	2	456	373	+83	23	Quarterfinals
2	(Romania) CSM București	14	10	2	2	439	386	+53	22	Quarterfinals
3	(Denmark) Odense Håndbold	14	8	0	6	398	373	+25	16	Playoffs
4	(Hungary) FTC-Rail Cargo Hungaria	14	7	1	6	407	374	+33	15	Playoffs
5	(Slovenia) RK Krim Mercator	14	6	0	8	399	405	−6	12 (Note: Krim 6 Pts, +4 GD; Brest 3 Pts, 0 GD; Bietigheim 3 Pts, −4 GD)	Playoffs
6	(France) Brest Bretagne Handball	14	5	2	7	377	378	−1	12	Playoffs
7	(Germany) SG BBM Bietigheim	14	5	2	7	432	388	+44	12	
8	(Czech Republic) DHK Baník Most	14	0	0	14	347	578	−231	0	

Source: EHF
Rules for classification: Tiebreakers
Notes:

10 September 2022; 16:00	FTC-Rail Cargo Hungaria (Hungary)	27–23	(Denmark) Odense Håndbold	Érd Aréna, Érd; Attendance: 1,400; Referees: Merz, Kuttler (GER)
10 September 2022; 16:00	three players 7	(12–12)	Rej 7	Érd Aréna, Érd; Attendance: 1,400; Referees: Merz, Kuttler (GER)
10 September 2022; 16:00	3× (yellow card) 1× (suspension)	Report	1× (suspension)	Érd Aréna, Érd; Attendance: 1,400; Referees: Merz, Kuttler (GER)

10 September 2022; 18:00	Vipers Kristiansand (Norway)	31–24	(France) Brest Bretagne Handball	Aquarama Kristiansand, Kristiansand; Attendance: 1,277; Referees: Christiansen, Hansen (DEN)
10 September 2022; 18:00	Jeřábková 8	(18–13)	Jauković 6	Aquarama Kristiansand, Kristiansand; Attendance: 1,277; Referees: Christiansen, Hansen (DEN)
10 September 2022; 18:00	3× (yellow card) 1× (suspension)	Report	1× (yellow card) 3× (suspension)	Aquarama Kristiansand, Kristiansand; Attendance: 1,277; Referees: Christiansen, Hansen (DEN)

11 September 2022; 14:00	DHK Baník Most (Czech Republic)	23–46	(Germany) SG BBM Bietigheim	Rocknet aréna, Chomutov; Attendance: 850; Referees: Antić, Jakovljević (SRB)
11 September 2022; 14:00	Smetková 7	(12–23)	Maidhof, Malá 6	Rocknet aréna, Chomutov; Attendance: 850; Referees: Antić, Jakovljević (SRB)
11 September 2022; 14:00	1× (yellow card) 2× (suspension)	Report	2× (yellow card) 1× (suspension)	Rocknet aréna, Chomutov; Attendance: 850; Referees: Antić, Jakovljević (SRB)

11 September 2022; 16:00	CSM București (Romania)	30–28	(Slovenia) RK Krim Mercator	Polyvalent Hall, Bucharest; Attendance: 3,200; Referees: Vujačić, Kažanegra (MNE)
11 September 2022; 16:00	Zaadi 9	(17–19)	Radičević 9	Polyvalent Hall, Bucharest; Attendance: 3,200; Referees: Vujačić, Kažanegra (MNE)
11 September 2022; 16:00	1× (yellow card) 4× (suspension) 1× (red card)	Report	3× (suspension)	Polyvalent Hall, Bucharest; Attendance: 3,200; Referees: Vujačić, Kažanegra (MNE)

18 September 2022; 14:00	RK Krim Mercator (Slovenia)	21–27	(Norway) Vipers Kristiansand	Arena Stožice, Ljubljana; Attendance: 550; Referees: Andorka, Hucker (HUN)
18 September 2022; 14:00	Dmitireva 8	(11–13)	Jeřábková 8	Arena Stožice, Ljubljana; Attendance: 550; Referees: Andorka, Hucker (HUN)
18 September 2022; 14:00	1× (yellow card) 1× (suspension)	Report	2× (yellow card) 1× (suspension)	Arena Stožice, Ljubljana; Attendance: 550; Referees: Andorka, Hucker (HUN)

18 September 2022; 14:00	SG BBM Bietigheim (Germany)	40–20	(Hungary) FTC-Rail Cargo Hungaria	Arena Ludwigsburg, Ludwigsburg; Attendance: 1,721; Referees: Carmaux, Mursch (FRA)
18 September 2022; 14:00	Maidhof 9	(18–9)	Klujber 6	Arena Ludwigsburg, Ludwigsburg; Attendance: 1,721; Referees: Carmaux, Mursch (FRA)
18 September 2022; 14:00	1× (suspension)	Report	4× (suspension)	Arena Ludwigsburg, Ludwigsburg; Attendance: 1,721; Referees: Carmaux, Mursch (FRA)

18 September 2022; 16:00	Odense Håndbold (Denmark)	41–22	(Czech Republic) DHK Baník Most	Sydbank Arena Odense, Odense; Attendance: 1,633; Referees: Sá, Sá (POR)
18 September 2022; 16:00	Housheer 7	(24–11)	Smetková 5	Sydbank Arena Odense, Odense; Attendance: 1,633; Referees: Sá, Sá (POR)
18 September 2022; 16:00	2× (suspension)	Report	5× (suspension)	Sydbank Arena Odense, Odense; Attendance: 1,633; Referees: Sá, Sá (POR)

18 September 2022; 16:00	Brest Bretagne Handball (France)	26–33	(Romania) CSM București	Brest Arena, Brest; Attendance: 2,955; Referees: Hatipoğlu, Şimşek (TUR)
18 September 2022; 16:00	Jauković 7	(13–17)	Omoregie 6	Brest Arena, Brest; Attendance: 2,955; Referees: Hatipoğlu, Şimşek (TUR)
18 September 2022; 16:00	2× (yellow card) 4× (suspension)	Report	5× (suspension)	Brest Arena, Brest; Attendance: 2,955; Referees: Hatipoğlu, Şimşek (TUR)

24 September 2022; 16:00	FTC-Rail Cargo Hungaria (Hungary)	20–21	(France) Brest Bretagne Handball	Érd Aréna, Érd; Attendance: 1,800; Referees: Vujačić, Kažanegra (MNE)
24 September 2022; 16:00	Klujber 8	(9–12)	Jauković 12	Érd Aréna, Érd; Attendance: 1,800; Referees: Vujačić, Kažanegra (MNE)
24 September 2022; 16:00	2× (yellow card) 3× (suspension)	Report	4× (suspension)	Érd Aréna, Érd; Attendance: 1,800; Referees: Vujačić, Kažanegra (MNE)

24 September 2022; 16:00	DHK Baník Most (Czech Republic)	29–42	(Slovenia) RK Krim Mercator	Rocknet aréna, Chomutov; Attendance: 500; Referees: Christidi, Papamattheou (GRE)
24 September 2022; 16:00	Stříšková 8	(13–21)	three players 6	Rocknet aréna, Chomutov; Attendance: 500; Referees: Christidi, Papamattheou (GRE)
24 September 2022; 16:00	5× (suspension)	Report	2× (yellow card) 4× (suspension) 1× (red card)	Rocknet aréna, Chomutov; Attendance: 500; Referees: Christidi, Papamattheou (GRE)

24 September 2022; 18:00	Vipers Kristiansand (Norway)	34–27	(Denmark) Odense Håndbold	Aquarama Kristiansand, Kristiansand; Attendance: 1,382; Referees: Vranes, Wenninger (AUT)
24 September 2022; 18:00	Valle Dahl 7	(16–10)	Rej, Van Wetering 7	Aquarama Kristiansand, Kristiansand; Attendance: 1,382; Referees: Vranes, Wenninger (AUT)
24 September 2022; 18:00	5× (suspension)	Report	1× (yellow card) 2× (suspension)	Aquarama Kristiansand, Kristiansand; Attendance: 1,382; Referees: Vranes, Wenninger (AUT)

25 September 2022; 16:00	CSM București (Romania)	28–28	(Germany) SG BBM Bietigheim	Polyvalent Hall, Bucharest; Attendance: 3,500; Referees: Lidacka, Lesiak (POL)
25 September 2022; 16:00	Neagu 8	(13–16)	Kudłacz-Gloc, Malá 5	Polyvalent Hall, Bucharest; Attendance: 3,500; Referees: Lidacka, Lesiak (POL)
25 September 2022; 16:00	4× (suspension)	Report	1× (yellow card) 4× (suspension)	Polyvalent Hall, Bucharest; Attendance: 3,500; Referees: Lidacka, Lesiak (POL)

9 October 2022; 14:00	RK Krim Mercator (Slovenia)	30–32	(Hungary) FTC-Rail Cargo Hungaria	Tivoli Hall, Ljubljana; Attendance: 525; Referees: Metalari, Nikolovski (MKD)
9 October 2022; 14:00	Radičević 9	(15–15)	Klujber 12	Tivoli Hall, Ljubljana; Attendance: 525; Referees: Metalari, Nikolovski (MKD)
9 October 2022; 14:00	2× (suspension) 1× (red card)	Report	5× (suspension)	Tivoli Hall, Ljubljana; Attendance: 525; Referees: Metalari, Nikolovski (MKD)

9 October 2022; 16:00	Brest Bretagne Handball (France)	31–26	(Czech Republic) DHK Baník Most	Brest Arena, Brest; Attendance: 3,694; Referees: Barysas, Petrusis (LTU)
9 October 2022; 16:00	Coatanea, Lassource 5	(17–14)	Cholevová 10	Brest Arena, Brest; Attendance: 3,694; Referees: Barysas, Petrusis (LTU)
9 October 2022; 16:00	2× (suspension)	Report	1× (suspension)	Brest Arena, Brest; Attendance: 3,694; Referees: Barysas, Petrusis (LTU)

9 October 2022; 16:00	Odense Håndbold (Denmark)	27–31	(Romania) CSM București	Sydbank Arena Odense, Odense; Attendance: 1,783; Referees: Álvarez, Bustamante (ESP)
9 October 2022; 16:00	Aardahl 9	(13–16)	Neagu 10	Sydbank Arena Odense, Odense; Attendance: 1,783; Referees: Álvarez, Bustamante (ESP)
9 October 2022; 16:00	1× (yellow card) 5× (suspension)	Report	2× (yellow card) 2× (suspension)	Sydbank Arena Odense, Odense; Attendance: 1,783; Referees: Álvarez, Bustamante (ESP)

9 October 2022; 16:00	SG BBM Bietigheim (Germany)	32–30	(Norway) Vipers Kristiansand	Arena Ludwigsburg, Ludwigsburg; Attendance: 1,803; Referees: Praštalo, Balvan (BIH)
9 October 2022; 16:00	three players 6	(16–17)	Valle Dahl 7	Arena Ludwigsburg, Ludwigsburg; Attendance: 1,803; Referees: Praštalo, Balvan (BIH)
9 October 2022; 16:00	1× (yellow card) 4× (suspension)	Report	1× (yellow card) 3× (suspension)	Arena Ludwigsburg, Ludwigsburg; Attendance: 1,803; Referees: Praštalo, Balvan (BIH)

15 October 2022; 16:00	FTC-Rail Cargo Hungaria (Hungary)	26–26	(Norway) Vipers Kristiansand	Érd Aréna, Érd; Attendance: 2,400; Referees: Sá, Sá (POR)
15 October 2022; 16:00	Klujber 6	(12–14)	Vyakhireva 8	Érd Aréna, Érd; Attendance: 2,400; Referees: Sá, Sá (POR)
15 October 2022; 16:00	2× (yellow card) 3× (suspension)	Report	1× (yellow card) 5× (suspension)	Érd Aréna, Érd; Attendance: 2,400; Referees: Sá, Sá (POR)

15 October 2022; 18:00	Brest Bretagne Handball (France)	21–25	(Denmark) Odense Håndbold	Brest Arena, Brest; Attendance: 3,081; Referees: Antić, Jakovljević (SRB)
15 October 2022; 18:00	Foppa, Jauković 4	(8–16)	Løseth 8	Brest Arena, Brest; Attendance: 3,081; Referees: Antić, Jakovljević (SRB)
15 October 2022; 18:00	3× (suspension)	Report	2× (yellow card) 4× (suspension)	Brest Arena, Brest; Attendance: 3,081; Referees: Antić, Jakovljević (SRB)

16 October 2022; 14:00	SG BBM Bietigheim (Germany)	30–23	(Slovenia) RK Krim Mercator	Arena Ludwigsburg, Ludwigsburg; Attendance: 953; Referees: Vranes, Wenninger (AUT)
16 October 2022; 14:00	Maidhof 6	(15–14)	Dmitrieva 6	Arena Ludwigsburg, Ludwigsburg; Attendance: 953; Referees: Vranes, Wenninger (AUT)
16 October 2022; 14:00	4× (suspension)	Report	3× (suspension) 1× (red card)	Arena Ludwigsburg, Ludwigsburg; Attendance: 953; Referees: Vranes, Wenninger (AUT)

16 October 2022; 16:00	CSM București (Romania)	40–25	(Czech Republic) DHK Baník Most	Polyvalent Hall, Bucharest; Attendance: 3,560; Referees: Kijauskaitė, Žalienė (LTU)
16 October 2022; 16:00	Neagu 5	(25–13)	Cholevová 6	Polyvalent Hall, Bucharest; Attendance: 3,560; Referees: Kijauskaitė, Žalienė (LTU)
16 October 2022; 16:00	3× (yellow card) 2× (suspension)	Report	1× (yellow card) 7× (suspension)	Polyvalent Hall, Bucharest; Attendance: 3,560; Referees: Kijauskaitė, Žalienė (LTU)

22 October 2022; 16:00	DHK Baník Most (Czech Republic)	27–46	(Hungary) FTC-Rail Cargo Hungaria	Rocknet aréna, Chomutov; Attendance: 680; Referees: Álvarez, Bustamante (ESP)
22 October 2022; 16:00	Cholevová 7	(11–26)	Klujber 11	Rocknet aréna, Chomutov; Attendance: 680; Referees: Álvarez, Bustamante (ESP)
22 October 2022; 16:00	3× (suspension)	Report	5× (suspension)	Rocknet aréna, Chomutov; Attendance: 680; Referees: Álvarez, Bustamante (ESP)

22 October 2022; 18:00	Vipers Kristiansand (Norway)	35–29	(Romania) CSM București	Aquarama Kristiansand, Kristiansand; Attendance: 1,901; Referees: Tzaferopoulos, Bethmann (GRE)
22 October 2022; 18:00	Jeřábková 11	(15–15)	Neagu 10	Aquarama Kristiansand, Kristiansand; Attendance: 1,901; Referees: Tzaferopoulos, Bethmann (GRE)
22 October 2022; 18:00	1× (yellow card) 5× (suspension)	Report	3× (yellow card) 3× (suspension)	Aquarama Kristiansand, Kristiansand; Attendance: 1,901; Referees: Tzaferopoulos, Bethmann (GRE)

23 October 2022; 14:00	RK Krim Mercator (Slovenia)	24–22	(France) Brest Bretagne Handball	Arena Stožice, Ljubljana; Attendance: 713; Referees: Duplii, Pobedrina (UKR)
23 October 2022; 14:00	Radičević 6	(12–10)	Carlson 6	Arena Stožice, Ljubljana; Attendance: 713; Referees: Duplii, Pobedrina (UKR)
23 October 2022; 14:00	1× (yellow card) 6× (suspension)	Report	1× (yellow card) 3× (suspension)	Arena Stožice, Ljubljana; Attendance: 713; Referees: Duplii, Pobedrina (UKR)

23 October 2022; 16:00	Odense Håndbold (Denmark)	31–24	(Germany) SG BBM Bietigheim	Sydbank Arena Odense, Odense; Attendance: 1,978; Referees: Metalari, Nikolovski (MKD)
23 October 2022; 16:00	Højlund 10	(14–12)	Maidhof 7	Sydbank Arena Odense, Odense; Attendance: 1,978; Referees: Metalari, Nikolovski (MKD)
23 October 2022; 16:00	2× (yellow card) 4× (suspension)	Report	5× (suspension)	Sydbank Arena Odense, Odense; Attendance: 1,978; Referees: Metalari, Nikolovski (MKD)

3 December 2022; 16:00	DHK Baník Most (Czech Republic)	21–43	(Norway) Vipers Kristiansand	Rocknet aréna, Chomutov; Attendance: 950; Referees: Lidacka, Lesiak (POL)
3 December 2022; 16:00	Andrýsková, Stříšková 5	(15–20)	Jeřábková 11	Rocknet aréna, Chomutov; Attendance: 950; Referees: Lidacka, Lesiak (POL)
3 December 2022; 16:00	3× (suspension)	Report	1× (suspension)	Rocknet aréna, Chomutov; Attendance: 950; Referees: Lidacka, Lesiak (POL)

4 December 2022; 14:00	RK Krim Mercator (Slovenia)	23–29	(Denmark) Odense Håndbold	Tivoli Hall, Ljubljana; Attendance: 1,125; Referees: Hatipoğlu, Şimşek (TUR)
4 December 2022; 14:00	three players 4	(15–11)	Van Wetering, Aardahl 6	Tivoli Hall, Ljubljana; Attendance: 1,125; Referees: Hatipoğlu, Şimşek (TUR)
4 December 2022; 14:00	2× (yellow card) 2× (suspension)	Report	1× (yellow card) 3× (suspension)	Tivoli Hall, Ljubljana; Attendance: 1,125; Referees: Hatipoğlu, Şimşek (TUR)

4 December 2022; 16:00	SG BBM Bietigheim (Germany)	25–25	(France) Brest Bretagne Handball	Arena Ludwigsburg, Ludwigsburg; Attendance: 1,211; Referees: Panayides, Andreou (CYP)
4 December 2022; 16:00	Dulfer 7	(14–13)	Toublanc 7	Arena Ludwigsburg, Ludwigsburg; Attendance: 1,211; Referees: Panayides, Andreou (CYP)
4 December 2022; 16:00	1× (yellow card) 3× (suspension)	Report	1× (yellow card) 3× (suspension)	Arena Ludwigsburg, Ludwigsburg; Attendance: 1,211; Referees: Panayides, Andreou (CYP)

4 December 2022; 16:00	CSM București (Romania)	30–24	(Hungary) FTC-Rail Cargo Hungaria	Polyvalent Hall, Bucharest; Attendance: 4,700; Referees: Jović, Arnautović (BIH)
4 December 2022; 16:00	Neagu 13	(10–11)	Malestein 5	Polyvalent Hall, Bucharest; Attendance: 4,700; Referees: Jović, Arnautović (BIH)
4 December 2022; 16:00	1× (suspension)	Report	3× (yellow card) 2× (suspension)	Polyvalent Hall, Bucharest; Attendance: 4,700; Referees: Jović, Arnautović (BIH)

10 December 2022; 16:00	FTC-Rail Cargo Hungaria (Hungary)	29–33	(Romania) CSM București	Érd Aréna, Érd; Attendance: 2,000; Referees: Antić, Jakovljević (SRB)
10 December 2022; 16:00	three players 5	(11–17)	Pintea 6	Érd Aréna, Érd; Attendance: 2,000; Referees: Antić, Jakovljević (SRB)
10 December 2022; 16:00		Report	1× (yellow card) 2× (suspension)	Érd Aréna, Érd; Attendance: 2,000; Referees: Antić, Jakovljević (SRB)

10 December 2022; 18:00	Vipers Kristiansand (Norway)	39–24	(Czech Republic) DHK Baník Most	Aquarama Kristiansand, Kristiansand; Attendance: 1,121; Referees: Nygaard, Pedersen (DEN)
10 December 2022; 18:00	Høve, Jeřábková 7	(18–10)	Cholevová 14	Aquarama Kristiansand, Kristiansand; Attendance: 1,121; Referees: Nygaard, Pedersen (DEN)
10 December 2022; 18:00	1× (yellow card) 1× (suspension)	Report	3× (suspension)	Aquarama Kristiansand, Kristiansand; Attendance: 1,121; Referees: Nygaard, Pedersen (DEN)

10 December 2022; 18:00	Brest Bretagne Handball (France)	32–28	(Germany) SG BBM Bietigheim	La Cimenterie, Landerneau; Attendance: 1,500; Referees: Caçador, Nicolau (POR)
10 December 2022; 18:00	Toublanc 9	(17–18)	Naidzinavicius 7	La Cimenterie, Landerneau; Attendance: 1,500; Referees: Caçador, Nicolau (POR)
10 December 2022; 18:00	3× (suspension)	Report	2× (yellow card) 5× (suspension) 1× (red card)	La Cimenterie, Landerneau; Attendance: 1,500; Referees: Caçador, Nicolau (POR)

11 December 2022; 16:00	Odense Håndbold (Denmark)	26–22	(Slovenia) RK Krim Mercator	Sydbank Arena Odense, Odense; Attendance: 1,778; Referees: Praštalo, Balvan (BIH)
11 December 2022; 16:00	Housheer 8	(15–11)	Rosiak 6	Sydbank Arena Odense, Odense; Attendance: 1,778; Referees: Praštalo, Balvan (BIH)
11 December 2022; 16:00	3× (suspension)	Report	2× (yellow card) 5× (suspension)	Sydbank Arena Odense, Odense; Attendance: 1,778; Referees: Praštalo, Balvan (BIH)

17 December 2022; 16:00	FTC-Rail Cargo Hungaria (Hungary)	43–19	(Czech Republic) DHK Baník Most	Érd Aréna, Érd; Attendance: 1,345; Referees: Vranes, Wenninger (AUT)
17 December 2022; 16:00	Klujber 10	(20–11)	Cholevová 6	Érd Aréna, Érd; Attendance: 1,345; Referees: Vranes, Wenninger (AUT)
17 December 2022; 16:00	3× (suspension)	Report	4× (suspension)	Érd Aréna, Érd; Attendance: 1,345; Referees: Vranes, Wenninger (AUT)

17 December 2022; 18:00	Brest Bretagne Handball (France)	22–24	(Slovenia) RK Krim Mercator	Brest Arena, Brest; Attendance: 3,766; Referees: Braseth, Sundet (NOR)
17 December 2022; 18:00	Jauković 6	(12–10)	Radičević 7	Brest Arena, Brest; Attendance: 3,766; Referees: Braseth, Sundet (NOR)
17 December 2022; 18:00	2× (suspension)	Report	1× (yellow card) 2× (suspension)	Brest Arena, Brest; Attendance: 3,766; Referees: Braseth, Sundet (NOR)

18 December 2022; 14:00	SG BBM Bietigheim (Germany)	24–27	(Denmark) Odense Håndbold	Arena Ludwigsburg, Ludwigsburg; Attendance: 1,912; Referees: Vujačić, Kažanegra (MNE)
18 December 2022; 14:00	Maidhof 6	(16–13)	Housheer 7	Arena Ludwigsburg, Ludwigsburg; Attendance: 1,912; Referees: Vujačić, Kažanegra (MNE)
18 December 2022; 14:00	2× (suspension)	Report	1× (yellow card) 2× (suspension)	Arena Ludwigsburg, Ludwigsburg; Attendance: 1,912; Referees: Vujačić, Kažanegra (MNE)

18 December 2022; 16:00	CSM București (Romania)	27–24	(Norway) Vipers Kristiansand	Polyvalent Hall, Bucharest; Attendance: 4,200; Referees: Palačković, Backović (SLO)
18 December 2022; 16:00	Neagu 9	(15–16)	Jeřábková 9	Polyvalent Hall, Bucharest; Attendance: 4,200; Referees: Palačković, Backović (SLO)
18 December 2022; 16:00	2× (suspension)	Report	2× (yellow card) 3× (suspension)	Polyvalent Hall, Bucharest; Attendance: 4,200; Referees: Palačković, Backović (SLO)

7 January 2023; 16:00	DHK Baník Most (Czech Republic)	26–35	(Romania) CSM București	Rocknet aréna, Chomutov; Attendance: 546; Referees: Duplii, Pobedrina (UKR)
7 January 2023; 16:00	Andrýsková 6	(10–20)	Neagu 10	Rocknet aréna, Chomutov; Attendance: 546; Referees: Duplii, Pobedrina (UKR)
7 January 2023; 16:00	3× (suspension)	Report	3× (suspension)	Rocknet aréna, Chomutov; Attendance: 546; Referees: Duplii, Pobedrina (UKR)

7 January 2023; 18:00	Odense Håndbold (Denmark)	25–24	(France) Brest Bretagne Handball	Sydbank Arena Odense, Odense; Attendance: 2,185; Referees: Doychinov, Goretsov (BUL)
7 January 2023; 18:00	Housheer, Van Wetering 6	(14–11)	Brnović, Toublanc 5	Sydbank Arena Odense, Odense; Attendance: 2,185; Referees: Doychinov, Goretsov (BUL)
7 January 2023; 18:00	2× (suspension)	Report	1× (yellow card) 2× (suspension)	Sydbank Arena Odense, Odense; Attendance: 2,185; Referees: Doychinov, Goretsov (BUL)

7 January 2023; 18:00	Vipers Kristiansand (Norway)	27–26	(Hungary) FTC-Rail Cargo Hungaria	Aquarama Kristiansand, Kristiansand; Attendance: 1,267; Referees: Vitaku, Vitaku (KOS)
7 January 2023; 18:00	Jeřábková, Vyakhireva 7	(15–15)	Bölk 8	Aquarama Kristiansand, Kristiansand; Attendance: 1,267; Referees: Vitaku, Vitaku (KOS)
7 January 2023; 18:00	3× (suspension)	Report	1× (yellow card) 5× (suspension)	Aquarama Kristiansand, Kristiansand; Attendance: 1,267; Referees: Vitaku, Vitaku (KOS)

8 January 2023; 16:00	RK Krim Mercator (Slovenia)	35–28	(Germany) SG BBM Bietigheim	Tivoli Hall, Ljubljana; Attendance: 1,150; Referees: Antić, Jakovljević (SRB)
8 January 2023; 16:00	Dmitrieva 12	(19–14)	Behrend, Kudłacz-Gloc 5	Tivoli Hall, Ljubljana; Attendance: 1,150; Referees: Antić, Jakovljević (SRB)
8 January 2023; 16:00	6× (suspension)	Report	2× (suspension)	Tivoli Hall, Ljubljana; Attendance: 1,150; Referees: Antić, Jakovljević (SRB)

14 January 2023; 16:00	FTC-Rail Cargo Hungaria (Hungary)	37–26	(Slovenia) RK Krim Mercator	Érd Aréna, Érd; Attendance: 2,000; Referees: Covalciuc, Covalciuc (MDA)
14 January 2023; 16:00	Klujber 10	(19–10)	Dmitrieva 10	Érd Aréna, Érd; Attendance: 2,000; Referees: Covalciuc, Covalciuc (MDA)
14 January 2023; 16:00	5× (suspension)	Report	1× (yellow card) 4× (suspension)	Érd Aréna, Érd; Attendance: 2,000; Referees: Covalciuc, Covalciuc (MDA)

14 January 2023; 16:00	DHK Baník Most (Czech Republic)	30–46	(France) Brest Bretagne Handball	Rocknet aréna, Chomutov; Attendance: 400; Referees: Praštalo, Balvan (BIH)
14 January 2023; 16:00	Stříšková 8	(14–22)	Fauske 7	Rocknet aréna, Chomutov; Attendance: 400; Referees: Praštalo, Balvan (BIH)
14 January 2023; 16:00	2× (suspension)	Report	2× (suspension)	Rocknet aréna, Chomutov; Attendance: 400; Referees: Praštalo, Balvan (BIH)

14 January 2023; 18:00	Vipers Kristiansand (Norway)	34–32	(Germany) SG BBM Bietigheim	Aquarama Kristiansand, Kristiansand; Attendance: 1,265; Referees: Álvarez, Bustamante (ESP)
14 January 2023; 18:00	Valle Dahl, Vyakhireva 9	(15–17)	Dulfer, Naidzinavicius 6	Aquarama Kristiansand, Kristiansand; Attendance: 1,265; Referees: Álvarez, Bustamante (ESP)
14 January 2023; 18:00	2× (yellow card)	Report	1× (yellow card) 2× (suspension)	Aquarama Kristiansand, Kristiansand; Attendance: 1,265; Referees: Álvarez, Bustamante (ESP)

14 January 2023; 18:00	CSM București (Romania)	40–31	(Denmark) Odense Håndbold	Polyvalent Hall, Bucharest; Attendance: 5,000; Referees: Pandžić, Mošorinski (SRB)
14 January 2023; 18:00	Neagu 10	(21–11)	Aardahl 8	Polyvalent Hall, Bucharest; Attendance: 5,000; Referees: Pandžić, Mošorinski (SRB)
14 January 2023; 18:00	1× (suspension)	Report	1× (yellow card) 2× (suspension)	Polyvalent Hall, Bucharest; Attendance: 5,000; Referees: Pandžić, Mošorinski (SRB)

21 January 2023; 18:00	Odense Håndbold (Denmark)	24–34	(Norway) Vipers Kristiansand	Phønix Tag Arena, Gudme; Attendance: 1,563; Referees: Jović, Arnautović (BIH)
21 January 2023; 18:00	Højlund, Iversen 6	(13–15)	Jeřábková 8	Phønix Tag Arena, Gudme; Attendance: 1,563; Referees: Jović, Arnautović (BIH)
21 January 2023; 18:00	2× (suspension)	Report	1× (yellow card) 4× (suspension)	Phønix Tag Arena, Gudme; Attendance: 1,563; Referees: Jović, Arnautović (BIH)

22 January 2023; 14:00	RK Krim Mercator (Slovenia)	42–31	(Czech Republic) DHK Baník Most	Tivoli Hall, Ljubljana; Attendance: 1,023; Referees: Ilieva, Karbeska (MKD)
22 January 2023; 14:00	Radičević 9	(24–11)	Cholevová 10	Tivoli Hall, Ljubljana; Attendance: 1,023; Referees: Ilieva, Karbeska (MKD)
22 January 2023; 14:00	1× (yellow card) 3× (suspension)	Report	1× (yellow card) 3× (suspension)	Tivoli Hall, Ljubljana; Attendance: 1,023; Referees: Ilieva, Karbeska (MKD)

22 January 2023; 14:00	SG BBM Bietigheim (Germany)	25–27	(Romania) CSM București	Arena Ludwigsburg, Ludwigsburg; Attendance: 2,105; Referees: Budzák, Záhradník (SVK)
22 January 2023; 14:00	Dulfer, Naidzinavicius 5	(12–15)	Aune 6	Arena Ludwigsburg, Ludwigsburg; Attendance: 2,105; Referees: Budzák, Záhradník (SVK)
22 January 2023; 14:00	1× (yellow card) 3× (suspension)	Report	1× (yellow card) 2× (suspension) 1× (red card)	Arena Ludwigsburg, Ludwigsburg; Attendance: 2,105; Referees: Budzák, Záhradník (SVK)

22 January 2023; 14:00	Brest Bretagne Handball (France)	24–21	(Hungary) FTC-Rail Cargo Hungaria	Brest Arena, Brest; Attendance: 4,000; Referees: Lovin, Stancu (ROU)
22 January 2023; 14:00	Jauković 7	(14–10)	Bölk 4	Brest Arena, Brest; Attendance: 4,000; Referees: Lovin, Stancu (ROU)
22 January 2023; 14:00	1× (yellow card) 1× (suspension)	Report	1× (yellow card) 2× (suspension)	Brest Arena, Brest; Attendance: 4,000; Referees: Lovin, Stancu (ROU)

4 February 2023; 16:00	FTC-Rail Cargo Hungaria (Hungary)	28–23	(Germany) SG BBM Bietigheim	Érd Aréna, Érd; Attendance: 2,000; Referees: Braseth, Sundet (NOR)
4 February 2023; 16:00	Klujber, Malestein 7	(10–12)	Malá 6	Érd Aréna, Érd; Attendance: 2,000; Referees: Braseth, Sundet (NOR)
4 February 2023; 16:00	4× (suspension)	Report	2× (suspension)	Érd Aréna, Érd; Attendance: 2,000; Referees: Braseth, Sundet (NOR)

4 February 2023; 18:00	Vipers Kristiansand (Norway)	36–31	(Slovenia) RK Krim Mercator	Aquarama Kristiansand, Kristiansand; Attendance: 1,583; Referees: Doychinov, Goretsov (BUL)
4 February 2023; 18:00	Jeřábková, Vyakhireva 8	(20–15)	three players 4	Aquarama Kristiansand, Kristiansand; Attendance: 1,583; Referees: Doychinov, Goretsov (BUL)
4 February 2023; 18:00	1× (yellow card) 5× (suspension)	Report	3× (suspension)	Aquarama Kristiansand, Kristiansand; Attendance: 1,583; Referees: Doychinov, Goretsov (BUL)

5 February 2023; 16:00	DHK Baník Most (Czech Republic)	19–37	(Denmark) Odense Håndbold	Rocknet aréna, Chomutov; Attendance: 520; Referees: Rauchs, Linster (LUX)
5 February 2023; 16:00	Cholevová 5	(10–16)	Housheer 7	Rocknet aréna, Chomutov; Attendance: 520; Referees: Rauchs, Linster (LUX)
5 February 2023; 16:00	6× (suspension)	Report	1× (yellow card) 1× (suspension)	Rocknet aréna, Chomutov; Attendance: 520; Referees: Rauchs, Linster (LUX)

5 February 2023; 16:00	CSM București (Romania)	30–30	(France) Brest Bretagne Handball	Polyvalent Hall, Bucharest; Attendance: 5,000; Referees: Metalari, Nikolovski (MKD)
5 February 2023; 16:00	Neagu 9	(15–18)	Jauković 8	Polyvalent Hall, Bucharest; Attendance: 5,000; Referees: Metalari, Nikolovski (MKD)
5 February 2023; 16:00	1× (suspension)	Report	1× (suspension)	Polyvalent Hall, Bucharest; Attendance: 5,000; Referees: Metalari, Nikolovski (MKD)

11 February 2023; 18:00	Brest Bretagne Handball (France)	29–36	(Norway) Vipers Kristiansand	Brest Arena, Brest; Attendance: 4,120; Referees: Duplii, Pobedrina (UKR)
11 February 2023; 18:00	Toublanc 6	(15–17)	Jeřábková 8	Brest Arena, Brest; Attendance: 4,120; Referees: Duplii, Pobedrina (UKR)
11 February 2023; 18:00	2× (suspension)	Report	2× (yellow card) 5× (suspension)	Brest Arena, Brest; Attendance: 4,120; Referees: Duplii, Pobedrina (UKR)

12 February 2023; 14:00	RK Krim Mercator (Slovenia)	28–26	(Romania) CSM București	Arena Stožice, Ljubljana; Attendance: 1,350; Referees: Konjičanin, Konjičanin (BIH)
12 February 2023; 14:00	Radičević, Stanko 7	(13–14)	Neagu 6	Arena Stožice, Ljubljana; Attendance: 1,350; Referees: Konjičanin, Konjičanin (BIH)
12 February 2023; 14:00	4× (suspension)	Report	2× (suspension)	Arena Stožice, Ljubljana; Attendance: 1,350; Referees: Konjičanin, Konjičanin (BIH)

12 February 2023; 14:00	SG BBM Bietigheim (Germany)	47–25	(Czech Republic) DHK Baník Most	Arena Ludwigsburg, Ludwigsburg; Attendance: 1,661; Referees: Geraets, Geraets (NED)
12 February 2023; 14:00	Döll, Meyer 7	(22–12)	Cholevová 6	Arena Ludwigsburg, Ludwigsburg; Attendance: 1,661; Referees: Geraets, Geraets (NED)
12 February 2023; 14:00		Report	2× (suspension)	Arena Ludwigsburg, Ludwigsburg; Attendance: 1,661; Referees: Geraets, Geraets (NED)

12 February 2023; 16:00	Odense Håndbold (Denmark)	25–28	(Hungary) FTC-Rail Cargo Hungaria	Sydbank Arena Odense, Odense; Attendance: 2,103; Referees: Mandák, Rudinský (SVK)
12 February 2023; 16:00	Housheer 6	(9–15)	Klujber 8	Sydbank Arena Odense, Odense; Attendance: 2,103; Referees: Mandák, Rudinský (SVK)
12 February 2023; 16:00	1× (yellow card) 1× (suspension)	Report	5× (suspension)	Sydbank Arena Odense, Odense; Attendance: 2,103; Referees: Mandák, Rudinský (SVK)

=== Group B ===
Pos	Team	Pld	W	D	L	GF	GA	GD	Pts	Qualification
1	(France) Metz Handball	14	12	1	1	429	352	+77	25	Quarterfinals
2	(Hungary) Győri Audi ETO KC	14	11	0	3	444	347	+97	22	Quarterfinals
3	(Denmark) Team Esbjerg	14	10	0	4	455	367	+88	20 (Note: Esbjerg 67–64 Rapid București)	Playoffs
4	(Romania) CS Rapid București	14	9	2	3	441	404	+37	20	Playoffs
5	(Montenegro) WHC Budućnost BEMAX	14	6	1	7	346	366	−20	13	Playoffs
6	(Norway) Storhamar Håndball Elite	14	4	0	10	377	406	−29	8	Playoffs
7	(Turkey) Kastamonu Bld. GSK	14	1	1	12	341	452	−111	3	
8	(Croatia) RK Lokomotiva Zagreb	14	0	1	13	276	415	−139	1	

Source: EHF
Rules for classification: Tiebreakers
Notes:

10 September 2022; 16:00	Kastamonu Bld. GSK (Turkey)	27–40	(Montenegro) WHC Budućnost BEMAX	Kastamonu Merkez Spor Salonu, Kastamonu; Attendance: 1,000; Referees: Covalciuc, Covalciuc (MDA)
10 September 2022; 16:00	Ježić 8	(13–20)	Raičević 13	Kastamonu Merkez Spor Salonu, Kastamonu; Attendance: 1,000; Referees: Covalciuc, Covalciuc (MDA)
10 September 2022; 16:00	3× (suspension)	Report	2× (suspension)	Kastamonu Merkez Spor Salonu, Kastamonu; Attendance: 1,000; Referees: Covalciuc, Covalciuc (MDA)

10 September 2022; 18:00	RK Lokomotiva Zagreb (Croatia)	27–31	(Romania) CS Rapid București	Sportska dvorana Sutinska vrela, Zagreb; Attendance: 400; Referees: Braseth, Sundet (NOR)
10 September 2022; 18:00	Birtić, Posavec 6	(12–16)	Badea, Buceschi 6	Sportska dvorana Sutinska vrela, Zagreb; Attendance: 400; Referees: Braseth, Sundet (NOR)
10 September 2022; 18:00	1× (yellow card) 4× (suspension)	Report	1× (suspension)	Sportska dvorana Sutinska vrela, Zagreb; Attendance: 400; Referees: Braseth, Sundet (NOR)

11 September 2022; 16:00	Metz Handball (France)	31–22	(Norway) Storhamar Håndball Elite	Palais des Sports Jean Weille, Nancy; Attendance: 2,156; Referees: Ilieva, Karbeska (MKD)
11 September 2022; 16:00	Bouktit 6	(21–9)	Jakobsen 8	Palais des Sports Jean Weille, Nancy; Attendance: 2,156; Referees: Ilieva, Karbeska (MKD)
11 September 2022; 16:00	2× (yellow card) 3× (suspension)	Report	2× (yellow card)	Palais des Sports Jean Weille, Nancy; Attendance: 2,156; Referees: Ilieva, Karbeska (MKD)

11 September 2022; 16:00	Team Esbjerg (Denmark)	29–31	(Hungary) Győri Audi ETO KC	Blue Water Dokken, Esbjerg; Attendance: 2,650; Referees: Panayides, Andreou (CYP)
11 September 2022; 16:00	Mørk 13	(13–13)	Gros 9	Blue Water Dokken, Esbjerg; Attendance: 2,650; Referees: Panayides, Andreou (CYP)
11 September 2022; 16:00	2× (yellow card) 2× (suspension)	Report	1× (yellow card) 4× (suspension)	Blue Water Dokken, Esbjerg; Attendance: 2,650; Referees: Panayides, Andreou (CYP)

17 September 2022; 16:00	WHC Budućnost BEMAX (Montenegro)	23–28	(Denmark) Team Esbjerg	Morača Sports Center, Podgorica; Attendance: 1,200; Referees: Budzák, Záhradník (SVK)
17 September 2022; 16:00	Raičević 6	(11–16)	Reistad 10	Morača Sports Center, Podgorica; Attendance: 1,200; Referees: Budzák, Záhradník (SVK)
17 September 2022; 16:00	1× (yellow card) 7× (suspension)	Report	7× (suspension) 1× (red card)	Morača Sports Center, Podgorica; Attendance: 1,200; Referees: Budzák, Záhradník (SVK)

17 September 2022; 18:00	Storhamar Håndball Elite (Norway)	37–13	(Croatia) RK Lokomotiva Zagreb	Boligpartner Arena, Hamar; Attendance: 1,244; Referees: Duplii, Pobedrina (UKR)
17 September 2022; 18:00	Abdulla 9	(22–7)	Posavec 4	Boligpartner Arena, Hamar; Attendance: 1,244; Referees: Duplii, Pobedrina (UKR)
17 September 2022; 18:00	3× (suspension)	Report	1× (yellow card) 6× (suspension)	Boligpartner Arena, Hamar; Attendance: 1,244; Referees: Duplii, Pobedrina (UKR)

18 September 2022; 14:00	CS Rapid București (Romania)	32–32	(France) Metz Handball	Polyvalent Hall, Bucharest; Attendance: 3,020; Referees: Álvarez, Bustamante (ESP)
18 September 2022; 14:00	Buceschi, Ostase 5	(16–21)	De Paula 11	Polyvalent Hall, Bucharest; Attendance: 3,020; Referees: Álvarez, Bustamante (ESP)
18 September 2022; 14:00	1× (suspension)	Report	5× (suspension)	Polyvalent Hall, Bucharest; Attendance: 3,020; Referees: Álvarez, Bustamante (ESP)

18 September 2022; 16:00	Győri Audi ETO KC (Hungary)	44–25	(Turkey) Kastamonu Bld. GSK	Audi Aréna, Győr; Attendance: 2,817; Referees: Praštalo, Balvan (BIH)
18 September 2022; 16:00	Blohm, Kristiansen 8	(23–13)	Carlos, Ježić 7	Audi Aréna, Győr; Attendance: 2,817; Referees: Praštalo, Balvan (BIH)
18 September 2022; 16:00	1× (yellow card) 3× (suspension)	Report	1× (yellow card) 4× (suspension)	Audi Aréna, Győr; Attendance: 2,817; Referees: Praštalo, Balvan (BIH)

24 September 2022; 18:00	Győri Audi ETO KC (Hungary)	24–28	(France) Metz Handball	Audi Aréna, Győr; Attendance: 4,019; Referees: Braseth, Sundet (NOR)
24 September 2022; 18:00	three players 4	(14–18)	Valentini 7	Audi Aréna, Győr; Attendance: 4,019; Referees: Braseth, Sundet (NOR)
24 September 2022; 18:00	1× (yellow card) 2× (suspension)	Report	1× (yellow card) 8× (suspension)	Audi Aréna, Győr; Attendance: 4,019; Referees: Braseth, Sundet (NOR)

24 September 2022; 18:00	RK Lokomotiva Zagreb (Croatia)	24–25	(Montenegro) WHC Budućnost BEMAX	Sportska dvorana Sutinska vrela, Zagreb; Attendance: 300; Referees: Doychinov, Goretsov (BUL)
24 September 2022; 18:00	Birtić 5	(14–13)	Raičević 7	Sportska dvorana Sutinska vrela, Zagreb; Attendance: 300; Referees: Doychinov, Goretsov (BUL)
24 September 2022; 18:00	5× (suspension)	Report	1× (yellow card) 4× (suspension)	Sportska dvorana Sutinska vrela, Zagreb; Attendance: 300; Referees: Doychinov, Goretsov (BUL)

25 September 2022; 14:00	Kastamonu Bld. GSK (Turkey)	26–33	(Romania) CS Rapid București	Kastamonu Merkez Spor Salonu, Kastamonu; Referees: Antić, Jakovljević (SRB)
25 September 2022; 14:00	Carlos, Ježić 6	(12–15)	Buceschi 7	Kastamonu Merkez Spor Salonu, Kastamonu; Referees: Antić, Jakovljević (SRB)
25 September 2022; 14:00	1× (yellow card) 6× (suspension)	Report	1× (yellow card) 1× (suspension)	Kastamonu Merkez Spor Salonu, Kastamonu; Referees: Antić, Jakovljević (SRB)

25 September 2022; 16:00	Team Esbjerg (Denmark)	35–25	(Norway) Storhamar Håndball Elite	Blue Water Dokken, Esbjerg; Attendance: 2,400; Referees: Kijauskaitė, Žalienė (LTU)
25 September 2022; 16:00	Reistad 8	(21–10)	Jakobsen 9	Blue Water Dokken, Esbjerg; Attendance: 2,400; Referees: Kijauskaitė, Žalienė (LTU)
25 September 2022; 16:00	1× (yellow card) 5× (suspension)	Report	2× (yellow card) 4× (suspension)	Blue Water Dokken, Esbjerg; Attendance: 2,400; Referees: Kijauskaitė, Žalienė (LTU)

8 October 2022; 16:00	WHC Budućnost BEMAX (Montenegro)	28–36	(France) Metz Handball	Morača Sports Center, Podgorica; Attendance: 545; Referees: Christiansen, Hansen (DEN)
8 October 2022; 16:00	Raičević 10	(16–21)	De Paula 9	Morača Sports Center, Podgorica; Attendance: 545; Referees: Christiansen, Hansen (DEN)
8 October 2022; 16:00	2× (yellow card) 3× (suspension)	Report	3× (suspension)	Morača Sports Center, Podgorica; Attendance: 545; Referees: Christiansen, Hansen (DEN)

8 October 2022; 18:00	Storhamar Håndball Elite (Norway)	31–29	(Turkey) Kastamonu Bld. GSK	Boligpartner Arena, Hamar; Attendance: 1,104; Referees: Palačković, Backović (SLO)
8 October 2022; 18:00	Jakobsen 9	(12–13)	Carlos 14	Boligpartner Arena, Hamar; Attendance: 1,104; Referees: Palačković, Backović (SLO)
8 October 2022; 18:00	1× (yellow card) 3× (suspension)	Report	1× (yellow card) 2× (suspension)	Boligpartner Arena, Hamar; Attendance: 1,104; Referees: Palačković, Backović (SLO)

9 October 2022; 14:00	CS Rapid București (Romania)	34–32	(Denmark) Team Esbjerg	Sala Sporturilor, Mioveni; Attendance: 1,500; Referees: Duplii, Pobedrina (UKR)
9 October 2022; 14:00	three players 5	(19–14)	Reistad 9	Sala Sporturilor, Mioveni; Attendance: 1,500; Referees: Duplii, Pobedrina (UKR)
9 October 2022; 14:00	1× (yellow card) 2× (suspension)	Report	2× (yellow card) 7× (suspension)	Sala Sporturilor, Mioveni; Attendance: 1,500; Referees: Duplii, Pobedrina (UKR)

9 October 2022; 16:00	Győri Audi ETO KC (Hungary)	32–16	(Croatia) RK Lokomotiva Zagreb	Audi Aréna, Győr; Attendance: 2,047; Referees: Ilieva, Karbeska (MKD)
9 October 2022; 16:00	Fodor, Nze Minko 7	(15–8)	Birtić 3	Audi Aréna, Győr; Attendance: 2,047; Referees: Ilieva, Karbeska (MKD)
9 October 2022; 16:00	2× (yellow card) 4× (suspension)	Report	3× (yellow card) 3× (suspension)	Audi Aréna, Győr; Attendance: 2,047; Referees: Ilieva, Karbeska (MKD)

15 October 2022; 16:00	Kastamonu Bld. GSK (Turkey)	26–23	(Croatia) RK Lokomotiva Zagreb	Kastamonu Merkez Spor Salonu, Kastamonu; Attendance: 1,000; Referees: Lidacka, Lesiak (POL)
15 October 2022; 16:00	Carlos 9	(16–11)	three players 5	Kastamonu Merkez Spor Salonu, Kastamonu; Attendance: 1,000; Referees: Lidacka, Lesiak (POL)
15 October 2022; 16:00	3× (suspension)	Report	1× (yellow card) 3× (suspension)	Kastamonu Merkez Spor Salonu, Kastamonu; Attendance: 1,000; Referees: Lidacka, Lesiak (POL)

15 October 2022; 18:00	WHC Budućnost BEMAX (Montenegro)	30–30	(Romania) CS Rapid București	Morača Sports Center, Podgorica; Attendance: 653; Referees: Merz, Kuttler (GER)
15 October 2022; 18:00	Raičević 12	(13–10)	Grozav, López 7	Morača Sports Center, Podgorica; Attendance: 653; Referees: Merz, Kuttler (GER)
15 October 2022; 18:00	2× (yellow card) 2× (suspension)	Report	1× (yellow card)	Morača Sports Center, Podgorica; Attendance: 653; Referees: Merz, Kuttler (GER)

16 October 2022; 16:00	Storhamar Håndball Elite (Norway)	21–35	(Hungary) Győri Audi ETO KC	Boligpartner Arena, Hamar; Attendance: 1,672; Referees: Doychinov, Goretsov (BUL)
16 October 2022; 16:00	Obaidli 5	(13–15)	Gros 6	Boligpartner Arena, Hamar; Attendance: 1,672; Referees: Doychinov, Goretsov (BUL)
16 October 2022; 16:00	1× (yellow card) 3× (suspension)	Report	2× (suspension)	Boligpartner Arena, Hamar; Attendance: 1,672; Referees: Doychinov, Goretsov (BUL)

16 October 2022; 16:00	Team Esbjerg (Denmark)	35–28	(France) Metz Handball	Blue Water Dokken, Esbjerg; Attendance: 2,490; Referees: Jović, Arnautović (BIH)
16 October 2022; 16:00	Breistøl 9	(18–12)	De Paula 8	Blue Water Dokken, Esbjerg; Attendance: 2,490; Referees: Jović, Arnautović (BIH)
16 October 2022; 16:00	5× (suspension)	Report	1× (yellow card) 6× (suspension)	Blue Water Dokken, Esbjerg; Attendance: 2,490; Referees: Jović, Arnautović (BIH)

22 October 2022; 18:00	Győri Audi ETO KC (Hungary)	32–19	(Montenegro) WHC Budućnost BEMAX	Audi Aréna, Győr; Attendance: 3,379; Referees: Palačković, Backović (SLO)
22 October 2022; 18:00	Kristiansen 6	(15–9)	Agović, Pavićević 5	Audi Aréna, Győr; Attendance: 3,379; Referees: Palačković, Backović (SLO)
22 October 2022; 18:00	1× (yellow card) 3× (suspension)	Report	2× (yellow card) 5× (suspension) 1× (red card)	Audi Aréna, Győr; Attendance: 3,379; Referees: Palačković, Backović (SLO)

22 October 2022; 18:00	Metz Handball (France)	38–13	(Croatia) RK Lokomotiva Zagreb	Arènes de Metz, Metz; Attendance: 3,188; Referees: Budzák, Záhradník (SVK)
22 October 2022; 18:00	Valentini 7	(20–6)	Posavec 4	Arènes de Metz, Metz; Attendance: 3,188; Referees: Budzák, Záhradník (SVK)
22 October 2022; 18:00	1× (suspension)	Report	2× (suspension)	Arènes de Metz, Metz; Attendance: 3,188; Referees: Budzák, Záhradník (SVK)

23 October 2022; 14:00	CS Rapid București (Romania)	27–25	(Norway) Storhamar Håndball Elite	Polyvalent Hall, Bucharest; Attendance: 3,600; Referees: Praštalo, Balvan (BIH)
23 October 2022; 14:00	Gutiérrez Bermejo 6	(14–15)	Abdulla, Jakobsen 6	Polyvalent Hall, Bucharest; Attendance: 3,600; Referees: Praštalo, Balvan (BIH)
23 October 2022; 14:00	1× (yellow card) 3× (suspension)	Report	1× (yellow card) 3× (suspension)	Polyvalent Hall, Bucharest; Attendance: 3,600; Referees: Praštalo, Balvan (BIH)

23 October 2022; 14:00	Kastamonu Bld. GSK (Turkey)	27–43	(Denmark) Team Esbjerg	Kastamonu Merkez Spor Salonu, Kastamonu; Attendance: 750; Referees: Ilieva, Karbeska (MKD)
23 October 2022; 14:00	Demirçelen, İskenderoğlu 5	(12–25)	Ingstad, Türkoglu 7	Kastamonu Merkez Spor Salonu, Kastamonu; Attendance: 750; Referees: Ilieva, Karbeska (MKD)
23 October 2022; 14:00	2× (suspension)	Report	1× (yellow card) 2× (suspension)	Kastamonu Merkez Spor Salonu, Kastamonu; Attendance: 750; Referees: Ilieva, Karbeska (MKD)

3 December 2022; 16:00	RK Lokomotiva Zagreb (Croatia)	18–30	(Denmark) Team Esbjerg	Sportska dvorana Sutinska vrela, Zagreb; Attendance: 300; Referees: Sirbu, Serdiuc (MDA)
3 December 2022; 16:00	Malec 6	(8–14)	Reistad 7	Sportska dvorana Sutinska vrela, Zagreb; Attendance: 300; Referees: Sirbu, Serdiuc (MDA)
3 December 2022; 16:00	1× (yellow card) 3× (suspension)	Report	1× (yellow card) 4× (suspension)	Sportska dvorana Sutinska vrela, Zagreb; Attendance: 300; Referees: Sirbu, Serdiuc (MDA)

3 December 2022; 18:00	Győri Audi ETO KC (Hungary)	32–30	(Romania) CS Rapid București	Audi Aréna, Győr; Attendance: 4,600; Referees: Mandák, Rudinský (SVK)
3 December 2022; 18:00	Gros 8	(18–15)	Kanor 7	Audi Aréna, Győr; Attendance: 4,600; Referees: Mandák, Rudinský (SVK)
3 December 2022; 18:00	1× (yellow card) 4× (suspension)	Report	1× (yellow card) 4× (suspension)	Audi Aréna, Győr; Attendance: 4,600; Referees: Mandák, Rudinský (SVK)

3 December 2022; 18:00	Metz Handball (France)	35–24	(Turkey) Kastamonu Bld. GSK	Arènes de Metz, Metz; Attendance: 2,978; Referees: Doychinov, Goretsov (BUL)
3 December 2022; 18:00	De Paula 7	(18–14)	Chebbah 7	Arènes de Metz, Metz; Attendance: 2,978; Referees: Doychinov, Goretsov (BUL)
3 December 2022; 18:00	2× (yellow card) 2× (suspension)	Report	1× (yellow card) 2× (suspension)	Arènes de Metz, Metz; Attendance: 2,978; Referees: Doychinov, Goretsov (BUL)

3 December 2022; 18:00	WHC Budućnost BEMAX (Montenegro)	24–23	(Norway) Storhamar Håndball Elite	Morača Sports Center, Podgorica; Attendance: 500; Referees: Duplii, Pobedrina (UKR)
3 December 2022; 18:00	Raičević 7	(12–11)	four players 4	Morača Sports Center, Podgorica; Attendance: 500; Referees: Duplii, Pobedrina (UKR)
3 December 2022; 18:00	4× (suspension)	Report	1× (yellow card) 3× (suspension)	Morača Sports Center, Podgorica; Attendance: 500; Referees: Duplii, Pobedrina (UKR)

10 December 2022; 16:00	Kastamonu Bld. GSK (Turkey)	23–28	(France) Metz Handball	Kastamonu Merkez Spor Salonu, Kastamonu; Attendance: 500; Referees: Vitaku, Vitaku (KOS)
10 December 2022; 16:00	Ježić 6	(13–13)	Kanor 4	Kastamonu Merkez Spor Salonu, Kastamonu; Attendance: 500; Referees: Vitaku, Vitaku (KOS)
10 December 2022; 16:00	3× (suspension)	Report	2× (yellow card) 3× (suspension)	Kastamonu Merkez Spor Salonu, Kastamonu; Attendance: 500; Referees: Vitaku, Vitaku (KOS)

10 December 2022; 18:00	Team Esbjerg (Denmark)	33–20	(Croatia) RK Lokomotiva Zagreb	Blue Water Dokken, Esbjerg; Attendance: 1,800; Referees: Yovchev, Yonchev (BUL)
10 December 2022; 18:00	Reistad 8	(18–13)	Birtić 6	Blue Water Dokken, Esbjerg; Attendance: 1,800; Referees: Yovchev, Yonchev (BUL)
10 December 2022; 18:00	1× (yellow card) 3× (suspension)	Report	2× (yellow card) 4× (suspension)	Blue Water Dokken, Esbjerg; Attendance: 1,800; Referees: Yovchev, Yonchev (BUL)

11 December 2022; 14:00	CS Rapid București (Romania)	30–27	(Hungary) Győri Audi ETO KC	Polyvalent Hall, Bucharest; Attendance: 5,000; Referees: Jurinović, Mrvica (CRO)
11 December 2022; 14:00	Buceschi, Grozav 7	(15–16)	three players 5	Polyvalent Hall, Bucharest; Attendance: 5,000; Referees: Jurinović, Mrvica (CRO)
11 December 2022; 14:00	1× (suspension)	Report	1× (yellow card) 3× (suspension)	Polyvalent Hall, Bucharest; Attendance: 5,000; Referees: Jurinović, Mrvica (CRO)

11 December 2022; 16:00	Storhamar Håndball Elite (Norway)	25–27	(Montenegro) WHC Budućnost BEMAX	Boligpartner Arena, Hamar; Attendance: 971; Referees: Lovin, Stancu (ROU)
11 December 2022; 16:00	Obaidli 6	(12–13)	Kepić 8	Boligpartner Arena, Hamar; Attendance: 971; Referees: Lovin, Stancu (ROU)
11 December 2022; 16:00	1× (yellow card) 3× (suspension)	Report	1× (yellow card) 3× (suspension)	Boligpartner Arena, Hamar; Attendance: 971; Referees: Lovin, Stancu (ROU)

17 December 2022; 18:00	Storhamar Håndball Elite (Norway)	29–36	(Romania) CS Rapid București	Boligpartner Arena, Hamar; Attendance: 723; Referees: Sá, Sá (POR)
17 December 2022; 18:00	Jakobsen 9	(15–17)	Grozav 7	Boligpartner Arena, Hamar; Attendance: 723; Referees: Sá, Sá (POR)
17 December 2022; 18:00	4× (suspension)	Report	3× (suspension)	Boligpartner Arena, Hamar; Attendance: 723; Referees: Sá, Sá (POR)

17 December 2022; 18:00	Team Esbjerg (Denmark)	39–31	(Turkey) Kastamonu Bld. GSK	Blue Water Dokken, Esbjerg; Attendance: 1,410; Referees: Geraets, Geraets (NED)
17 December 2022; 18:00	Kamp 6	(23–17)	Chebbah 12	Blue Water Dokken, Esbjerg; Attendance: 1,410; Referees: Geraets, Geraets (NED)
17 December 2022; 18:00	1× (yellow card) 3× (suspension)	Report	1× (yellow card) 2× (suspension)	Blue Water Dokken, Esbjerg; Attendance: 1,410; Referees: Geraets, Geraets (NED)

17 December 2022; 20:00	WHC Budućnost BEMAX (Montenegro)	23–25	(Hungary) Győri Audi ETO KC	Morača Sports Center, Podgorica; Attendance: 1,300; Referees: Ilieva, Karbeska (MKD)
17 December 2022; 20:00	Ćorović 4	(12–14)	Oftedal 6	Morača Sports Center, Podgorica; Attendance: 1,300; Referees: Ilieva, Karbeska (MKD)
17 December 2022; 20:00	2× (yellow card) 3× (suspension)	Report	1× (yellow card) 5× (suspension)	Morača Sports Center, Podgorica; Attendance: 1,300; Referees: Ilieva, Karbeska (MKD)

18 December 2022; 14:00	RK Lokomotiva Zagreb (Croatia)	18–27	(France) Metz Handball	Sportska dvorana Sutinska vrela, Zagreb; Attendance: 400; Referees: Duplii, Pobedrina (UKR)
18 December 2022; 14:00	Malec 5	(6–13)	Bont, Bouktit 5	Sportska dvorana Sutinska vrela, Zagreb; Attendance: 400; Referees: Duplii, Pobedrina (UKR)
18 December 2022; 14:00	1× (yellow card) 4× (suspension)	Report	2× (suspension)	Sportska dvorana Sutinska vrela, Zagreb; Attendance: 400; Referees: Duplii, Pobedrina (UKR)

7 January 2023; 16:00	Győri Audi ETO KC (Hungary)	39–26	(Norway) Storhamar Håndball Elite	Audi Aréna, Győr; Attendance: 4,179; Referees: Vranes, Wenninger (AUT)
7 January 2023; 16:00	Blohm, Oftedal 5	(17–13)	Obaidli 6	Audi Aréna, Győr; Attendance: 4,179; Referees: Vranes, Wenninger (AUT)
7 January 2023; 16:00	5× (suspension)	Report	5× (suspension)	Audi Aréna, Győr; Attendance: 4,179; Referees: Vranes, Wenninger (AUT)

8 January 2023; 14:00	RK Lokomotiva Zagreb (Croatia)	26–26	(Turkey) Kastamonu Bld. GSK	Sportska dvorana Sutinska vrela, Zagreb; Attendance: 350; Referees: Lovin, Stancu (ROU)
8 January 2023; 14:00	Birtić 7	(12–14)	Chebbah 8	Sportska dvorana Sutinska vrela, Zagreb; Attendance: 350; Referees: Lovin, Stancu (ROU)
8 January 2023; 14:00	1× (yellow card) 2× (suspension)	Report	2× (yellow card) 4× (suspension)	Sportska dvorana Sutinska vrela, Zagreb; Attendance: 350; Referees: Lovin, Stancu (ROU)

8 January 2023; 16:00	Metz Handball (France)	26–24	(Denmark) Team Esbjerg	Arènes de Metz, Metz; Attendance: 3,654; Referees: Jurinović, Mrvica (CRO)
8 January 2023; 16:00	Jørgensen 7	(11–11)	Reistad 7	Arènes de Metz, Metz; Attendance: 3,654; Referees: Jurinović, Mrvica (CRO)
8 January 2023; 16:00	1× (yellow card) 1× (suspension)	Report	1× (yellow card) 1× (suspension)	Arènes de Metz, Metz; Attendance: 3,654; Referees: Jurinović, Mrvica (CRO)

8 January 2023; 16:00	CS Rapid București (Romania)	39–29	(Montenegro) WHC Budućnost BEMAX	Polyvalent Hall, Bucharest; Attendance: 4,500; Referees: Barysas, Petrusis (LTU)
8 January 2023; 16:00	Polman 6	(17–12)	Godeč 8	Polyvalent Hall, Bucharest; Attendance: 4,500; Referees: Barysas, Petrusis (LTU)
8 January 2023; 16:00	5× (suspension)	Report	2× (suspension)	Polyvalent Hall, Bucharest; Attendance: 4,500; Referees: Barysas, Petrusis (LTU)

14 January 2023; 18:00	RK Lokomotiva Zagreb (Croatia)	16–27	(Hungary) Győri Audi ETO KC	Sportska dvorana Sutinska vrela, Zagreb; Attendance: 490; Referees: Vujačić, Kažanegra (MNE)
14 January 2023; 18:00	Petika 8	(8–14)	Gros 8	Sportska dvorana Sutinska vrela, Zagreb; Attendance: 490; Referees: Vujačić, Kažanegra (MNE)
14 January 2023; 18:00	1× (yellow card) 3× (suspension)	Report	1× (yellow card) 3× (suspension)	Sportska dvorana Sutinska vrela, Zagreb; Attendance: 490; Referees: Vujačić, Kažanegra (MNE)

15 January 2023; 14:00	Kastamonu Bld. GSK (Turkey)	28–33	(Norway) Storhamar Håndball Elite	Kastamonu Merkez Spor Salonu, Kastamonu; Attendance: 1,100; Referees: Metalari, Nikolovski (MKD)
15 January 2023; 14:00	Ježić 5	(13–17)	Obaidli 13	Kastamonu Merkez Spor Salonu, Kastamonu; Attendance: 1,100; Referees: Metalari, Nikolovski (MKD)
15 January 2023; 14:00	1× (yellow card) 1× (suspension)	Report	3× (suspension)	Kastamonu Merkez Spor Salonu, Kastamonu; Attendance: 1,100; Referees: Metalari, Nikolovski (MKD)

15 January 2023; 16:00	Metz Handball (France)	29–23	(Montenegro) WHC Budućnost BEMAX	Arènes de Metz, Metz; Attendance: 2,808; Referees: Sá, Sá (POR)
15 January 2023; 16:00	Valentini 6	(13–9)	Pletikosić 7	Arènes de Metz, Metz; Attendance: 2,808; Referees: Sá, Sá (POR)
15 January 2023; 16:00	5× (suspension)	Report	5× (suspension)	Arènes de Metz, Metz; Attendance: 2,808; Referees: Sá, Sá (POR)

15 January 2023; 16:00	Team Esbjerg (Denmark)	35–30	(Romania) CS Rapid București	Blue Water Dokken, Esbjerg; Attendance: 2,800; Referees: Braseth, Sundet (NOR)
15 January 2023; 16:00	Reistad 15	(18–13)	Gutiérrez Bermejo 9	Blue Water Dokken, Esbjerg; Attendance: 2,800; Referees: Braseth, Sundet (NOR)
15 January 2023; 16:00	3× (suspension)	Report	1× (yellow card) 4× (suspension)	Blue Water Dokken, Esbjerg; Attendance: 2,800; Referees: Braseth, Sundet (NOR)

21 January 2023; 16:00	WHC Budućnost BEMAX (Montenegro)	25–18	(Croatia) RK Lokomotiva Zagreb	Morača Sports Center, Podgorica; Attendance: 620; Referees: Palačković, Backović (SLO)
21 January 2023; 16:00	Godeč 6	(16–8)	Birtić 4	Morača Sports Center, Podgorica; Attendance: 620; Referees: Palačković, Backović (SLO)
21 January 2023; 16:00	1× (yellow card) 6× (suspension)	Report	1× (yellow card) 5× (suspension)	Morača Sports Center, Podgorica; Attendance: 620; Referees: Palačković, Backović (SLO)

21 January 2023; 18:00	Metz Handball (France)	29–28	(Hungary) Győri Audi ETO KC	Arènes de Metz, Metz; Attendance: 4,500; Referees: Antić, Jakovljević (SRB)
21 January 2023; 18:00	De Paula, Jørgensen 6	(13–13)	Gros 10	Arènes de Metz, Metz; Attendance: 4,500; Referees: Antić, Jakovljević (SRB)
21 January 2023; 18:00	2× (suspension)	Report	1× (yellow card)	Arènes de Metz, Metz; Attendance: 4,500; Referees: Antić, Jakovljević (SRB)

22 January 2023; 16:00	Storhamar Håndball Elite (Norway)	25–34	(Denmark) Team Esbjerg	Boligpartner Arena, Hamar; Attendance: 1,624; Referees: Lidacka, Lesiak (POL)
22 January 2023; 16:00	Johansson, Obaidli 5	(11–19)	Reistad 7	Boligpartner Arena, Hamar; Attendance: 1,624; Referees: Lidacka, Lesiak (POL)
22 January 2023; 16:00	1× (yellow card) 2× (suspension)	Report	2× (suspension)	Boligpartner Arena, Hamar; Attendance: 1,624; Referees: Lidacka, Lesiak (POL)

22 January 2023; 16:00	CS Rapid București (Romania)	28–22	(Turkey) Kastamonu Bld. GSK	Polyvalent Hall, Bucharest; Attendance: 5,000; Referees: Duplii, Pobedrina (UKR)
22 January 2023; 16:00	Polman 6	(15–13)	Chebbah 5	Polyvalent Hall, Bucharest; Attendance: 5,000; Referees: Duplii, Pobedrina (UKR)
22 January 2023; 16:00	2× (suspension)	Report	1× (yellow card) 2× (suspension)	Polyvalent Hall, Bucharest; Attendance: 5,000; Referees: Duplii, Pobedrina (UKR)

4 February 2023; 16:00	RK Lokomotiva Zagreb (Croatia)	22–31	(Norway) Storhamar Håndball Elite	Sportska dvorana Sutinska vrela, Zagreb; Attendance: 200; Referees: Andorka, Hucker (HUN)
4 February 2023; 16:00	Birtić, Malec 6	(12–17)	Obaidli 10	Sportska dvorana Sutinska vrela, Zagreb; Attendance: 200; Referees: Andorka, Hucker (HUN)
4 February 2023; 16:00	2× (yellow card) 5× (suspension)	Report	1× (yellow card) 2× (suspension)	Sportska dvorana Sutinska vrela, Zagreb; Attendance: 200; Referees: Andorka, Hucker (HUN)

4 February 2023; 18:00	Metz Handball (France)	36–34	(Romania) CS Rapid București	Arènes de Metz, Metz; Attendance: 4,398; Referees: Vujačić, Kažanegra (MNE)
4 February 2023; 18:00	De Paula, Jørgensen 8	(20–17)	three players 6	Arènes de Metz, Metz; Attendance: 4,398; Referees: Vujačić, Kažanegra (MNE)
4 February 2023; 18:00	1× (yellow card) 2× (suspension)	Report	3× (suspension)	Arènes de Metz, Metz; Attendance: 4,398; Referees: Vujačić, Kažanegra (MNE)

4 February 2023; 18:00	Team Esbjerg (Denmark)	30–20	(Montenegro) WHC Budućnost BEMAX	Blue Water Dokken, Esbjerg; Attendance: 2,392; Referees: Praštalo, Balvan (BIH)
4 February 2023; 18:00	Reistad, Türkoglu 5	(15–9)	Raičević 5	Blue Water Dokken, Esbjerg; Attendance: 2,392; Referees: Praštalo, Balvan (BIH)
4 February 2023; 18:00	1× (yellow card) 4× (suspension)	Report	1× (yellow card) 4× (suspension)	Blue Water Dokken, Esbjerg; Attendance: 2,392; Referees: Praštalo, Balvan (BIH)

5 February 2023; 14:00	Kastamonu Bld. GSK (Turkey)	27–39	(Hungary) Győri Audi ETO KC	Kastamonu Merkez Spor Salonu, Kastamonu; Attendance: 500; Referees: Lindenbaum, Laron (ISR)
5 February 2023; 14:00	Chebbah 7	(12–16)	Nze Minko 8	Kastamonu Merkez Spor Salonu, Kastamonu; Attendance: 500; Referees: Lindenbaum, Laron (ISR)
5 February 2023; 14:00	1× (yellow card) 4× (suspension)	Report	1× (suspension)	Kastamonu Merkez Spor Salonu, Kastamonu; Attendance: 500; Referees: Lindenbaum, Laron (ISR)

11 February 2023; 18:00	Győri Audi ETO KC (Hungary)	29–28	(Denmark) Team Esbjerg	Audi Aréna, Győr; Attendance: 5,100; Referees: Sekulić, Jovandić (SRB)
11 February 2023; 18:00	Gros 7	(12–11)	Reistad 12	Audi Aréna, Győr; Attendance: 5,100; Referees: Sekulić, Jovandić (SRB)
11 February 2023; 18:00	5× (suspension)	Report	1× (yellow card) 5× (suspension)	Audi Aréna, Győr; Attendance: 5,100; Referees: Sekulić, Jovandić (SRB)

12 February 2023; 16:00	Storhamar Håndball Elite (Norway)	24–26	(France) Metz Handball	Boligpartner Arena, Hamar; Attendance: 958; Referees: Fukala, Mohyla (CZE)
12 February 2023; 16:00	Venn 6	(16–11)	Bouktit 8	Boligpartner Arena, Hamar; Attendance: 958; Referees: Fukala, Mohyla (CZE)
12 February 2023; 16:00	1× (yellow card) 3× (suspension)	Report	5× (suspension)	Boligpartner Arena, Hamar; Attendance: 958; Referees: Fukala, Mohyla (CZE)

12 February 2023; 16:00	CS Rapid București (Romania)	27–22	(Croatia) RK Lokomotiva Zagreb	Polyvalent Hall, Bucharest; Attendance: 4,500; Referees: Ilieva, Karbeska (MKD)
12 February 2023; 16:00	Kanor 9	(15–12)	Petika 7	Polyvalent Hall, Bucharest; Attendance: 4,500; Referees: Ilieva, Karbeska (MKD)
12 February 2023; 16:00	1× (yellow card) 4× (suspension)	Report	1× (yellow card) 3× (suspension)	Polyvalent Hall, Bucharest; Attendance: 4,500; Referees: Ilieva, Karbeska (MKD)

Cancelled (Note: The match was cancelled due to the Turkey-Syria earthquake.)	WHC Budućnost BEMAX (Montenegro)	10–0	(Turkey) Kastamonu Bld. GSK
