= 2022–23 Győri ETO KC season =

Győri Audi ETO KC
2022–23 season
- Chairman: Anita Görbicz
- Manager: (Spain) Ambros Martín
- Stadium: Audi Aréna
- NB I: Champions
- Hungarian Cup: Runner-up
- EHF Champions League: Third-place
- Top goalscorer: League: (France) Estelle Nze Minko (104 goals); All: (Slovenia) Ana Gros (208 goals)
Home colours	Away colours

The 2022–23 season was Győri Audi ETO KC's 43rd competitive and consecutive season in the Nemzeti Bajnokság I and 75th year in existence as a handball club.

== Players ==
=== Squad information ===
Goalkeepers

- 12 (France) Amandine Leynaud
- 16 (Norway) Silje Solberg
- 89 (Denmark) Sandra Toft

Left wingers

- 6 (Hungary) Nadine Schatzl
- 23 (Hungary) Csenge Fodor

Right wingers

- 22 (Hungary) Viktória Győri-Lukács
- 48 (Hungary) Dorottya Faluvégi

Pivots

- 5 (Sweden) Linn Blohm
- 7 (Norway) Kari Brattset Dale
- 31 (Netherlands) Yvette Broch

Left backs

- 2 (Denmark) Line Haugsted
- 4 (Hungary) Eszter Ogonovszky
- 8 (Denmark) Anne Mette Hansen (c)
- 21 (Norway) Veronica Kristiansen

Centre backs

- 15 (Norway) Stine Bredal Oftedal
- 27 (France) Estelle Nze Minko
- 81 (Hungary) Júlia Farkas

Right backs

- 9 (Slovenia) Ana Gros
- 11 (South Korea) Ryu Eun-hee
- 80 (Montenegro) Jelena Despotović

=== Transfers ===
IN

- (Denmark) Sandra Toft (GK) (from (France) Brest Bretagne Handball)
- (Denmark) Line Haugsted (LB) (from (Denmark) Viborg HK)
- (Slovenia) Ana Gros (RB) (from (Slovenia) RK Krim)
- (Netherlands) Yvette Broch (P) (from (Romania) CSM București)
- (France) Raphaëlle Tervel (assistant coach)

OUT

- (France) Amandine Leynaud (GK) (retires)
- (France) Laura Glauser (GK) (to (Romania) CSM București)
- (Hungary) Noémi Háfra (LB) (on loan to (Denmark) Odense Håndbold)
- (Hungary) Laura Kürthi (RB) (to (Hungary) Váci NKSE)
- (Hungary) Fanni Gerencsér (LW/LB) (to (Hungary) Érd HC)
- (Hungary) Tamara Pál (CB) (to (Hungary) MTK Budapest)
- (Hungary) Johanna Farkas (CB) (to (Hungary) Dunaújvárosi Kohász KA)
- (Romania) Crina Pintea (P) (to (Romania) CSM București)

== Club ==
=== Technical Staff ===
Position	Staff member
President	(Hungary) Anita Görbicz
Technical manager	(Hungary) Péter Molnár
Head coach	(Spain) Ambros Martín
Assistant coach	(France) Raphaëlle Tervel
Team doctor	(Hungary) Dr. Péter Balogh
Team doctor	(Hungary) Dr. László Szálasy
Physiotherapist	(Hungary) Ádám Devecseri
Physiotherapist	(Hungary) Nikolett Budai
Physiotherapist	(Hungary) Edina Csernák
Fitness coach	(Hungary) Zoltán Holanek
Video Analytics	(Hungary) Attila Kun

Source: Coaches, Management

=== Uniform ===
- Supplier: (Germany) Adidas/ (Japan) Mizuno
- Main sponsor: Audi / tippmix / OTP Bank / City of Győr
- Back sponsor: PannErgy / Győrszol
- Shorts sponsor: OMV / Leier / OIL!

== Pre-season ==
=== Friendly matches ===
5 August 2021; 17:00	Győri Audi ETO KC	42–31	(Germany) Sport Union Neckarsulmer	Audi Aréna, Győr
5 August 2021; 17:00	Hansen 10	(21–18)	Gorshenina 8	Audi Aréna, Győr
5 August 2021; 17:00		Report		Audi Aréna, Győr

11 August 2021; 17:00	Győri Audi ETO KC	28–23	(France) Brest Bretagne Handball	Audi Aréna, Győr
11 August 2021; 17:00	Gros 6	(15–10)	Coatanea 6	Audi Aréna, Győr
11 August 2021; 17:00		Report		Audi Aréna, Győr

18 August 2021; 17:00	Győri Audi ETO KC	32–27	(Denmark) Odense Håndbold	Audi Aréna, Győr
18 August 2021; 17:00	Győri-Lukács 6	(13–15)	Rej, van Wetering 6	Audi Aréna, Győr
18 August 2021; 17:00		Report		Audi Aréna, Győr

== Competitions ==
=== Overview ===
Win Draw Loss

Competition	First match	Last match	Starting round	Record							
Competition	First match	Last match	Starting round	Pld	W	D	L	GF	GA	GD	Win %
Nemzeti Bajnokság I	26 August 2022	27 May 2023	Matchday 1	26	25	0	1	854	590	+264	96.15
Magyar Kupa	29 March 2023	23 April 2023	Fifth round	3	2	0	1	93	69	+24	66.67
EHF Champions League	11 September 2022	June 2023	Group stage	18	14	0	4	573	466	+107	77.78
Total				47	41	0	6	1,520	1,125	+395	87.23

Source: Competitions

=== Nemzeti Bajnokság I ===
==== League table ====
Pos	Team	Pld	W	D	L	GF	GA	GD	Pts	Qualification or relegation
1	Győri Audi ETO KC	26	25	0	1	854	590	+264	50	Qualification to Champions League group stage
2	FTC-Rail Cargo Hungaria	26	23	2	1	853	614	+239	48	Qualification to Champions League group stage
3	DVSC SCHAEFFLER	26	18	3	5	778	633	+145	39	Qualification to Champions League group stage
4	Motherson-Mosonmagyaróvár	26	17	2	7	799	698	+101	36	Qualification to European League group phase
5	Siófok KC	26	13	4	9	731	697	+34	30 (Note: Liquidation proceedings were launched against the club due to unpaid employee wages, as a result of which they were relegated to the third division.)	Relegation to Nemzeti Bajnokság I/B

Source: mksz.hu
Rules for classification: 1) Points; 2) Goal difference; 3) Head-to-head points; 4) Head-to-head goal difference; 5) Goals scored; 6) Matches won; 7) Draw (Note: Head-to-head record is used only after all the matches between the teams in question have been played)

==== Results by round ====
Match	1	2	3	4	5	6	7	8	9	10	11	12	13	14	15	16	17	18	19	20	21	22	23	24	25	26
Ground	A	H	A	H	H	A	H	A	H	A	H	A	H	H	A	A	H	A	H	A	A	H	A	H	A	H
Result	W	W	W	W	W	W	W	W	W	L	W	W	W	W	W	W	W	W	W	W	W	W	W	W	W	W

Source: Matches
A = Away; H = Home; W = Win; D = Draw; L = Loss

==== Matches ====
Round 8; 26 August 2022; 18:15	Kisvárdai KC	19–32	Győri Audi ETO KC	Városi Sportcsarnok Kisvárda, Kisvárda; Attendance: 900; Referees: Rontó, Szanyi
Round 8; 26 August 2022; 18:15	Akiyama 4	(12–14)	Broch 5	Városi Sportcsarnok Kisvárda, Kisvárda; Attendance: 900; Referees: Rontó, Szanyi
Round 8; 26 August 2022; 18:15	3× (yellow card) 5× (suspension)	Report	3× (suspension)	Városi Sportcsarnok Kisvárda, Kisvárda; Attendance: 900; Referees: Rontó, Szanyi

Round 1; 2 September 2022; 18:00	Győri Audi ETO KC	33–24	Moyra-Budaörs Handball	Audi Aréna, Győr; Attendance: 1,811; Referees: Kovács-Sebők, Vastag-Réti
Round 1; 2 September 2022; 18:00	Gros, Oftedal 4	(18–11)	Gorilska 6	Audi Aréna, Győr; Attendance: 1,811; Referees: Kovács-Sebők, Vastag-Réti
Round 1; 2 September 2022; 18:00	2× (suspension)	Report		Audi Aréna, Győr; Attendance: 1,811; Referees: Kovács-Sebők, Vastag-Réti

Round 2; 6 September 2022; 18:00	Érd HC	22–35	Győri Audi ETO KC	Érd Aréna, Érd; Attendance: 800; Referees: Bujdosó, Horváth
Round 2; 6 September 2022; 18:00	Kopecz 5	(8–14)	three players 5	Érd Aréna, Érd; Attendance: 800; Referees: Bujdosó, Horváth
Round 2; 6 September 2022; 18:00	1× (yellow card) 1× (suspension)	Report	1× (yellow card) 4× (suspension)	Érd Aréna, Érd; Attendance: 800; Referees: Bujdosó, Horváth

Round 3; 14 September 2022; 18:00	Győri Audi ETO KC	33–27	Siófok KC	Audi Aréna, Győr; Attendance: 2,000; Referees: Őri, Pozdena
Round 3; 14 September 2022; 18:00	Hansen 5	(18–10)	Mavsar 10	Audi Aréna, Győr; Attendance: 2,000; Referees: Őri, Pozdena
Round 3; 14 September 2022; 18:00	3× (suspension)	Report	1× (suspension)	Audi Aréna, Győr; Attendance: 2,000; Referees: Őri, Pozdena

Round 22; 5 October 2022; 19:00	Győri Audi ETO KC	25–22	Debreceni VSC	Audi Aréna, Győr; Attendance: 1,894; Referees: Nagy, Túróczy
Round 22; 5 October 2022; 19:00	three players 5	(11–11)	Töpfner 7	Audi Aréna, Győr; Attendance: 1,894; Referees: Nagy, Túróczy
Round 22; 5 October 2022; 19:00	1× (yellow card) 2× (suspension)	Report	1× (yellow card) 4× (suspension)	Audi Aréna, Győr; Attendance: 1,894; Referees: Nagy, Túróczy

Round 4; 12 October 2022; 18:00	Váci NKSE	17–28	Győri Audi ETO KC	Városi Sportcsarnok Vác, Vác; Attendance: 660; Referees: Haskó, Natkai
Round 4; 12 October 2022; 18:00	Kuczora 5	(8–16)	Blohm 8	Városi Sportcsarnok Vác, Vác; Attendance: 660; Referees: Haskó, Natkai
Round 4; 12 October 2022; 18:00	1× (suspension)	Report	2× (suspension)	Városi Sportcsarnok Vác, Vác; Attendance: 660; Referees: Haskó, Natkai

Round 5; 19 October 2022; 18:00	Győri Audi ETO KC	34–20	Nemzeti Kézilabda Akadémia	Audi Aréna, Győr; Attendance: 1,029; Referees: Dáné, Marton
Round 5; 19 October 2022; 18:00	Blohm 6	(16–11)	Uhrin 8	Audi Aréna, Győr; Attendance: 1,029; Referees: Dáné, Marton
Round 5; 19 October 2022; 18:00	1× (suspension)	Report	1× (yellow card) 2× (suspension)	Audi Aréna, Győr; Attendance: 1,029; Referees: Dáné, Marton

Round 11; 30 November 2022; 18:00	Alba Fehérvár KC	21–33	Győri Audi ETO KC	Köfém Sportcsarnok, Székesfehérvár; Attendance: 700; Referees: Ignéczi, Pánczél-Héjjas
Round 11; 30 November 2022; 18:00	Zrnić 6	(9–15)	Gros, Nze Minko 6	Köfém Sportcsarnok, Székesfehérvár; Attendance: 700; Referees: Ignéczi, Pánczél-Héjjas
Round 11; 30 November 2022; 18:00	2× (suspension)	Report	1× (yellow card) 3× (suspension)	Köfém Sportcsarnok, Székesfehérvár; Attendance: 700; Referees: Ignéczi, Pánczél-Héjjas

Round 6; 7 December 2022; 18:00	Győri Audi ETO KC	36–24	Békéscsabai Előre NKSE	Audi Aréna, Győr; Attendance: 1,027; Referees: Kovács-Sebők, Vastag-Réti
Round 6; 7 December 2022; 18:00	Nze Minko 8	(15–11)	Lanistanin 7	Audi Aréna, Győr; Attendance: 1,027; Referees: Kovács-Sebők, Vastag-Réti
Round 6; 7 December 2022; 18:00		Report	3× (suspension)	Audi Aréna, Győr; Attendance: 1,027; Referees: Kovács-Sebők, Vastag-Réti

Round 7; 14 December 2022; 17:30	FTC-Rail Cargo Hungaria	32–26	Győri Audi ETO KC	Elek Gyula Aréna, Budapest; Attendance: 1,200; Referees: Bócz, Wiedemann
Round 7; 14 December 2022; 17:30	Cvijić 6	(15–16)	Oftedal 5	Elek Gyula Aréna, Budapest; Attendance: 1,200; Referees: Bócz, Wiedemann
Round 7; 14 December 2022; 17:30	1× (yellow card) 3× (suspension)	Report	1× (yellow card) 1× (suspension)	Elek Gyula Aréna, Budapest; Attendance: 1,200; Referees: Bócz, Wiedemann

Round 21; 21 December 2022; 18:30	Győri Audi ETO KC	30–19	Kisvárdai KC	Audi Aréna, Győr; Attendance: 1,137; Referees: Hajdu, Halász
Round 21; 21 December 2022; 18:30	Nze Minko, Oftedal 6	(19–11)	Akiyama, Karnik 3	Audi Aréna, Győr; Attendance: 1,137; Referees: Hajdu, Halász
Round 21; 21 December 2022; 18:30	2× (yellow card) 3× (suspension)	Report	2× (yellow card) 6× (suspension)	Audi Aréna, Győr; Attendance: 1,137; Referees: Hajdu, Halász

Round 9; 30 December 2022; 19:00	DVSC Schaeffler	30–31	Győri Audi ETO KC	Hódos Imre Sports Hall, Debrecen; Attendance: 2,000; Referees: Hargitai, Markó
Round 9; 30 December 2022; 19:00	Kácsor 10	(15–16)	Ryu 7	Hódos Imre Sports Hall, Debrecen; Attendance: 2,000; Referees: Hargitai, Markó
Round 9; 30 December 2022; 19:00	4× (suspension)	Report	3× (yellow card) 5× (suspension)	Hódos Imre Sports Hall, Debrecen; Attendance: 2,000; Referees: Hargitai, Markó

Round 21; 11 January 2023; 18:00	Győri Audi ETO KC	40–24	Dunaújvárosi Kohász KA	Audi Aréna, Győr; Attendance: 1,878; Referees: Sándor, Szikszay
Round 21; 11 January 2023; 18:00	Oftedal 7	(22–7)	Arany 6	Audi Aréna, Győr; Attendance: 1,878; Referees: Sándor, Szikszay
Round 21; 11 January 2023; 18:00	1× (yellow card) 2× (suspension)	Report	1× (yellow card) 2× (suspension)	Audi Aréna, Győr; Attendance: 1,878; Referees: Sándor, Szikszay

Round 12; 28 January 2023; 18:00	Győri Audi ETO KC	31–25	MTK Budapest	Audi Aréna, Győr; Attendance: 1,907; Referees: Őri, Pozdena
Round 12; 28 January 2023; 18:00	Győri-Lukács 9	(17–10)	Pál 8	Audi Aréna, Győr; Attendance: 1,907; Referees: Őri, Pozdena
Round 12; 28 January 2023; 18:00	1× (yellow card) 5× (suspension)	Report	4× (suspension)	Audi Aréna, Győr; Attendance: 1,907; Referees: Őri, Pozdena

Round 13; 1 February 2023; 18:00	Mosonmagyaróvári KC SE	21–28	Győri Audi ETO KC	UFM Aréna, Mosonmagyaróvár; Attendance: 1,000; Referees: Paska, Vastag
Round 13; 1 February 2023; 18:00	E. Tóth 4	(11–17)	Gros 5	UFM Aréna, Mosonmagyaróvár; Attendance: 1,000; Referees: Paska, Vastag
Round 13; 1 February 2023; 18:00	1× (yellow card) 3× (suspension)	Report	1× (yellow card) 2× (suspension)	UFM Aréna, Mosonmagyaróvár; Attendance: 1,000; Referees: Paska, Vastag

Round 14; 8 February 2023; 18:00	Moyra-Budaörs Handball	13–38	Győri Audi ETO KC	Városi Sportcsarnok Budaörs, Budaörs; Attendance: 770; Referees: Dáné, Marton
Round 14; 8 February 2023; 18:00	Májer 3	(6–20)	Blohm 8	Városi Sportcsarnok Budaörs, Budaörs; Attendance: 770; Referees: Dáné, Marton
Round 14; 8 February 2023; 18:00	1× (suspension)	Report	1× (yellow card) 2× (suspension)	Városi Sportcsarnok Budaörs, Budaörs; Attendance: 770; Referees: Dáné, Marton

Round 15; 18 February 2023; 18:00	Győri Audi ETO KC	39–23	Érd HC	Audi Aréna, Győr; Attendance: 1,251; Referees: Ignéczi, Pánczél-Héjjas
Round 15; 18 February 2023; 18:00	Blohm 7	(19–9)	Dávid-Azari 4	Audi Aréna, Győr; Attendance: 1,251; Referees: Ignéczi, Pánczél-Héjjas
Round 15; 18 February 2023; 18:00	1× (suspension)	Report	3× (suspension)	Audi Aréna, Győr; Attendance: 1,251; Referees: Ignéczi, Pánczél-Héjjas

Round 16; 23 February 2023; 18:00	Siófok KC	26–30	Győri Audi ETO KC	Kiss Szilárd Aréna, Siófok; Attendance: 600; Referees: Fekete, Tóth
Round 16; 23 February 2023; 18:00	Mavsar 9	(13–18)	Gros 6	Kiss Szilárd Aréna, Siófok; Attendance: 600; Referees: Fekete, Tóth
Round 16; 23 February 2023; 18:00	4× (suspension)	Report	1× (yellow card) 4× (suspension)	Kiss Szilárd Aréna, Siófok; Attendance: 600; Referees: Fekete, Tóth

Round 17; 11 March 2023; 17:00	Győri Audi ETO KC	36–25	Váci NKSE	Audi Aréna, Győr; Attendance: 1,855; Referees: Bóna, Földesi
Round 17; 11 March 2023; 17:00	Blohm, Gros 8	(20–11)	Kurucz 6	Audi Aréna, Győr; Attendance: 1,855; Referees: Bóna, Földesi
Round 17; 11 March 2023; 17:00	1× (suspension)	Report	1× (yellow card) 2× (suspension)	Audi Aréna, Győr; Attendance: 1,855; Referees: Bóna, Földesi

Round 18; 17 March 2023; 18:00	Nemzeti Kézilabda Akadémia	25–33	Győri Audi ETO KC	NEKA Csarnok, Balatonboglár; Attendance: 650; Referees: Haskó, Natkai
Round 18; 17 March 2023; 18:00	Csíkos 8	(15–20)	Faluvégi 5	NEKA Csarnok, Balatonboglár; Attendance: 650; Referees: Haskó, Natkai
Round 18; 17 March 2023; 18:00	1× (yellow card)	Report	1× (yellow card) 1× (suspension)	NEKA Csarnok, Balatonboglár; Attendance: 650; Referees: Haskó, Natkai

Round 19; 25 March 2023; 18:00	Békéscsabai Előre NKSE	22–33	Győri Audi ETO KC	Városi Sportcsarnok, Békéscsaba; Attendance: 1,650; Referees: Kovács-Sebők, Vastag-Réti
Round 19; 25 March 2023; 18:00	Termány 4	(12–16)	Gros, Ryu 6	Városi Sportcsarnok, Békéscsaba; Attendance: 1,650; Referees: Kovács-Sebők, Vastag-Réti
Round 19; 25 March 2023; 18:00	1× (yellow card) 5× (suspension)	Report	2× (yellow card) 1× (suspension)	Városi Sportcsarnok, Békéscsaba; Attendance: 1,650; Referees: Kovács-Sebők, Vastag-Réti

Round 20; 1 April 2023; 17:30	Győri Audi ETO KC	31–20	FTC-Rail Cargo Hungaria	Audi Aréna, Győr; Attendance: 5,350; Referees: Horváth, Marton
Round 20; 1 April 2023; 17:30	Gros 10	(17–8)	Klujber 6	Audi Aréna, Győr; Attendance: 5,350; Referees: Horváth, Marton
Round 20; 1 April 2023; 17:30	2× (yellow card) 2× (suspension)	Report	1× (yellow card) 2× (suspension)	Audi Aréna, Győr; Attendance: 5,350; Referees: Horváth, Marton

Round 23; 18 April 2023; 17:00	Dunaújvárosi Kohász KA	14–35	Győri Audi ETO KC	Városi Sportcsarnok, Dunaújváros; Attendance: 500; Referees: Bujdosó, Horváth
Round 23; 18 April 2023; 17:00	Szalai 4	(7–14)	Nze Minko 7	Városi Sportcsarnok, Dunaújváros; Attendance: 500; Referees: Bujdosó, Horváth
Round 23; 18 April 2023; 17:00	1× (yellow card) 3× (suspension)	Report	1× (yellow card) 1× (suspension)	Városi Sportcsarnok, Dunaújváros; Attendance: 500; Referees: Bujdosó, Horváth

Round 24; 14 May 2023; 17:00	Győri Audi ETO KC	35–23	Alba Fehérvár KC	Audi Aréna, Győr; Attendance: 1,821; Referees: Ignéczi, Pánczél-Héjjas
Round 24; 14 May 2023; 17:00	Nze Minko 6	(22–11)	Afentáler 5	Audi Aréna, Győr; Attendance: 1,821; Referees: Ignéczi, Pánczél-Héjjas
Round 24; 14 May 2023; 17:00	2× (yellow card) 2× (suspension)	Report		Audi Aréna, Győr; Attendance: 1,821; Referees: Ignéczi, Pánczél-Héjjas

Round 25; 20 May 2023; 18:00	MTK Budapest	28–39	Győri Audi ETO KC	Riz Levente Sport és Rendvezvény Központ, Budapest; Attendance: 700; Referees: Ónodi, Őri
Round 25; 20 May 2023; 18:00	Szabó 7	(13–17)	Nze Minko 7	Riz Levente Sport és Rendvezvény Központ, Budapest; Attendance: 700; Referees: Ónodi, Őri
Round 25; 20 May 2023; 18:00	1× (yellow card) 5× (suspension) 1× (red card)	Report	5× (suspension)	Riz Levente Sport és Rendvezvény Központ, Budapest; Attendance: 700; Referees: Ónodi, Őri

Round 26; 27 May 2023; 16:30	Győri Audi ETO KC	30–25	Mosonmagyaróvári KC SE	Audi Aréna, Győr; Attendance: 3,791; Referees: Sándor, Szikszay
Round 26; 27 May 2023; 16:30	Faluvégi 5	(14–16)	Albek, Kovács 5	Audi Aréna, Győr; Attendance: 3,791; Referees: Sándor, Szikszay
Round 26; 27 May 2023; 16:30	1× (yellow card) 3× (suspension)	Report	1× (yellow card) 6× (suspension)	Audi Aréna, Győr; Attendance: 3,791; Referees: Sándor, Szikszay

==== Results overview ====
Opposition	Home score	Away score	Double
Alba Fehérvár KC	35–23	21–33	68–44
Békéscsabai Előre NKSE	36–24	22–33	69–46
Moyra-Budaörs Handball	33–24	13–38	71–37
DVSC Schaeffler	25–22	30–31	56–52
Dunaújvárosi Kohász KA	40–24	14–35	75–38
Érd	39–23	22–35	74–45
FTC-Rail Cargo Hungaria	31–20	32–26	57–52
Kisvárda Master Good SE	30–19	19–32	62–38
MTK Budapest	31–25	28–39	70–53
Motherson-Mosonmagyaróvár	30–25	21–28	58–46
Nemzeti Kézilabda Akadémia	34–20	25–33	67–45
Siófok KC	33–27	26–30	63–53
Váci NKSE	36–25	17–28	64–42

=== Hungarian Cup ===
==== Round 5 ====
Round 5; 29 March 2023; 18:00	Szombathelyi KKA	15–39	Győri Audi ETO KC	Arena Savaria, Szombathely; Attendance: 1,200; Referees: Hársfalvi, Mórocz
Round 5; 29 March 2023; 18:00	Szmolek 4	(10–20)	Blohm, Gros 7	Arena Savaria, Szombathely; Attendance: 1,200; Referees: Hársfalvi, Mórocz
Round 5; 29 March 2023; 18:00	1× (yellow card) 2× (suspension)	Report	2× (yellow card) 3× (suspension)	Arena Savaria, Szombathely; Attendance: 1,200; Referees: Hársfalvi, Mórocz

==== Semifinal ====
Semi-final; 22 April 2023; 15:00	Győri Audi ETO KC	27–26	DVSC Schaeffler	Tatabányai Multifunkcionális Sportcsarnok, Tatabánya; Attendance: 2,500; Referees: Andorka, Hucker
Semi-final; 22 April 2023; 15:00	Blohm 8	(16–14)	Planéta 6	Tatabányai Multifunkcionális Sportcsarnok, Tatabánya; Attendance: 2,500; Referees: Andorka, Hucker
Semi-final; 22 April 2023; 15:00	2× (yellow card) 2× (suspension)	Report	1× (yellow card) 5× (suspension)	Tatabányai Multifunkcionális Sportcsarnok, Tatabánya; Attendance: 2,500; Referees: Andorka, Hucker

==== Final ====
Final; 23 April 2023; 16:30	Győri Audi ETO KC	27–28	FTC-Rail Cargo Hungaria	Tatabányai Multifunkcionális Sportcsarnok, Tatabánya; Attendance: 2,800; Referees: Felhő, Öcsi
Final; 23 April 2023; 16:30	Fodor, Nze Minko 6	(14–13)	Klujber 8	Tatabányai Multifunkcionális Sportcsarnok, Tatabánya; Attendance: 2,800; Referees: Felhő, Öcsi
Final; 23 April 2023; 16:30	4× (suspension)	Report	1× (yellow card) 2× (suspension)	Tatabányai Multifunkcionális Sportcsarnok, Tatabánya; Attendance: 2,800; Referees: Felhő, Öcsi

=== EHF Champions League ===
==== Group stage ====
Pos	Team	Pld	W	D	L	GF	GA	GD	Pts	Qualification	MET	GYO	ESB	BUC	BUD	SHE	KAS	LOK
1	(France) Metz Handball	14	12	1	1	429	352	+77	25	Quarterfinals	—	29–28	26–24	36–34	29–23	31–22	35–24	38–13
2	(Hungary) Győri Audi ETO KC	14	11	0	3	444	347	+97	22	Quarterfinals	24–28	—	29–28	32–30	32–19	39–26	44–25	32–16
3	(Denmark) Team Esbjerg	14	10	0	4	455	367	+88	20 (Note: Esbjerg 67–64 Rapid București)	Playoffs	35–28	29–31	—	35–30	30–20	35–25	39–31	33–20
4	(Romania) CS Rapid București	14	9	2	3	441	404	+37	20	Playoffs	32–32	30–27	34–32	—	39–29	27–25	28–22	27–22
5	(Montenegro) WHC Budućnost BEMAX	14	6	1	7	346	366	−20	13	Playoffs	28–36	22–25	23–28	30–30	—	24–23	10–0	25–18
6	(Norway) Storhamar Håndball Elite	14	4	0	10	377	406	−29	8	Playoffs	24–26	21–35	25–34	29–36	25–27	—	31–29	37–13
7	(Turkey) Kastamonu Bld. GSK	14	1	1	12	341	452	−111	3		23–28	27–39	27–43	26–33	27–40	28–33	—	26–23
8	(Croatia) RK Lokomotiva Zagreb	14	0	1	13	276	415	−139	1		18–27	16–27	18–30	27–31	24–25	22–31	26–26	—

Source: EHF
Rules for classification: Tiebreakers

===== Matches =====
11 September 2022; 16:00	Team Esbjerg (Denmark)	29–31	Győri Audi ETO KC	Blue Water Dokken, Esbjerg; Attendance: 2,650; Referees: Panayides, Andreou (CYP)
11 September 2022; 16:00	Mørk 13	(13–13)	Gros 9	Blue Water Dokken, Esbjerg; Attendance: 2,650; Referees: Panayides, Andreou (CYP)
11 September 2022; 16:00	2× (yellow card) 2× (suspension)	Report	1× (yellow card) 4× (suspension)	Blue Water Dokken, Esbjerg; Attendance: 2,650; Referees: Panayides, Andreou (CYP)

18 September 2022; 16:00	Győri Audi ETO KC	44–25	(Turkey) Kastamonu Bld. GSK	Audi Aréna, Győr; Attendance: 2,817; Referees: Praštalo, Balvan (BIH)
18 September 2022; 16:00	Blohm, Kristiansen 8	(23–14)	Carlos, Ježić 7	Audi Aréna, Győr; Attendance: 2,817; Referees: Praštalo, Balvan (BIH)
18 September 2022; 16:00	1× (yellow card) 3× (suspension)	Report	1× (yellow card) 4× (suspension)	Audi Aréna, Győr; Attendance: 2,817; Referees: Praštalo, Balvan (BIH)

24 September 2022; 18:00	Győri Audi ETO KC	24–28	(France) Metz Handball	Audi Aréna, Győr; Attendance: 4,019; Referees: Braseth, Sundet (NOR)
24 September 2022; 18:00	three players 4	(14–18)	Valentini 7	Audi Aréna, Győr; Attendance: 4,019; Referees: Braseth, Sundet (NOR)
24 September 2022; 18:00	1× (yellow card) 2× (suspension)	Report	1× (yellow card) 8× (suspension)	Audi Aréna, Győr; Attendance: 4,019; Referees: Braseth, Sundet (NOR)

9 October 2022; 16:00	Győri Audi ETO KC	32–16	(Croatia) RK Lokomotiva Zagreb	Audi Aréna, Győr; Attendance: 2,047; Referees: Ilieva, Karbeska (MKD)
9 October 2022; 16:00	Fodor, Nze Minko 7	(15–8)	Birtic 3	Audi Aréna, Győr; Attendance: 2,047; Referees: Ilieva, Karbeska (MKD)
9 October 2022; 16:00	2× (yellow card) 4× (suspension)	Report	3× (yellow card) 3× (suspension)	Audi Aréna, Győr; Attendance: 2,047; Referees: Ilieva, Karbeska (MKD)

16 October 2022; 16:00	Storhamar HE (Norway)	21–35	Győri Audi ETO KC	Boligpartner Arena, Hamar; Attendance: 1,672; Referees: Doychinov, Goretsov (BUL)
16 October 2022; 16:00	Obaidli 5	(13–15)	Gros 6	Boligpartner Arena, Hamar; Attendance: 1,672; Referees: Doychinov, Goretsov (BUL)
16 October 2022; 16:00	1× (yellow card) 3× (suspension)	Report	2× (suspension)	Boligpartner Arena, Hamar; Attendance: 1,672; Referees: Doychinov, Goretsov (BUL)

22 October 2022; 18:00	Győri Audi ETO KC	32–19	(Montenegro) Budućnost BEMAX	Audi Aréna, Győr; Attendance: 3,379; Referees: Palačković, Backović (SLO)
22 October 2022; 18:00	Kristiansen 6	(15–9)	Agović, Pavićević 5	Audi Aréna, Győr; Attendance: 3,379; Referees: Palačković, Backović (SLO)
22 October 2022; 18:00	1× (yellow card) 3× (suspension)	Report	1× (yellow card) 5× (suspension) 1× (red card)	Audi Aréna, Győr; Attendance: 3,379; Referees: Palačković, Backović (SLO)

3 December 2022; 18:00	Győri Audi ETO KC	32–30	(Romania) CS Rapid București	Audi Aréna, Győr; Attendance: 4,600; Referees: Hannes, Hannes (GER)
3 December 2022; 18:00	Gros 8	(18–15)	Kanor 7	Audi Aréna, Győr; Attendance: 4,600; Referees: Hannes, Hannes (GER)
3 December 2022; 18:00	1× (yellow card) 3× (suspension)	Report	1× (yellow card) 4× (suspension)	Audi Aréna, Győr; Attendance: 4,600; Referees: Hannes, Hannes (GER)

11 December 2022; 14:00	CS Rapid București (Romania)	30–27	Győri Audi ETO KC	Polyvalent Hall, Bucharest; Attendance: 5,000; Referees: Jurinović, Mrvica (CRO)
11 December 2022; 14:00	Buceschi, Grozav 7	(15–16)	three players 5	Polyvalent Hall, Bucharest; Attendance: 5,000; Referees: Jurinović, Mrvica (CRO)
11 December 2022; 14:00	1× (suspension)	Report	1× (yellow card) 3× (suspension)	Polyvalent Hall, Bucharest; Attendance: 5,000; Referees: Jurinović, Mrvica (CRO)

17 December 2022; 18:00	Budućnost BEMAX (Montenegro)	23–25	Győri Audi ETO KC	Morača Sports Center, Podgorica; Attendance: 1,300; Referees: Ilieva, Karbeska (MKD)
17 December 2022; 18:00	Ćorović 4	(12–14)	Oftedal 6	Morača Sports Center, Podgorica; Attendance: 1,300; Referees: Ilieva, Karbeska (MKD)
17 December 2022; 18:00	2× (yellow card) 3× (suspension)	Report	1× (yellow card) 5× (suspension)	Morača Sports Center, Podgorica; Attendance: 1,300; Referees: Ilieva, Karbeska (MKD)

7 January 2023; 16:00	Győri Audi ETO KC	39–26	(Norway) Storhamar HE	Audi Aréna, Győr; Attendance: 4,179; Referees: Vranes, Wenninger (AUT)
7 January 2023; 16:00	Blohm, Oftedal 5	(17–13)	Obaidli 6	Audi Aréna, Győr; Attendance: 4,179; Referees: Vranes, Wenninger (AUT)
7 January 2023; 16:00	5× (suspension)	Report	5× (suspension)	Audi Aréna, Győr; Attendance: 4,179; Referees: Vranes, Wenninger (AUT)

14 January 2023; 18:00	RK Lokomotiva Zagreb (Croatia)	16–27	Győri Audi ETO KC	Sportska dvorana Sutinska vrela, Zagreb; Attendance: 490; Referees: Vujačić, Kažanegra (MNE)
14 January 2023; 18:00	Petika 8	(8–14)	Gros 8	Sportska dvorana Sutinska vrela, Zagreb; Attendance: 490; Referees: Vujačić, Kažanegra (MNE)
14 January 2023; 18:00	1× (yellow card) 3× (suspension)	Report	1× (yellow card) 3× (suspension)	Sportska dvorana Sutinska vrela, Zagreb; Attendance: 490; Referees: Vujačić, Kažanegra (MNE)

21 January 2023; 18:00	Metz Handball (France)	29–28	Győri Audi ETO KC	Arènes de Metz, Metz; Attendance: 4500; Referees: Antić, Jakovljević (SRB)
21 January 2023; 18:00	de Paula, Jørgensen 6	(13–13)	Gros 10	Arènes de Metz, Metz; Attendance: 4500; Referees: Antić, Jakovljević (SRB)
21 January 2023; 18:00	2× (suspension)	Report	1× (yellow card)	Arènes de Metz, Metz; Attendance: 4500; Referees: Antić, Jakovljević (SRB)

5 February 2023; 13:00	Kastamonu Bld. GSK (Turkey)	27–39	Győri Audi ETO KC	Kastamonu Merkez Spor Salonu, Kastamonu; Attendance: 500; Referees: Lindenbaum, Laron (ISR)
5 February 2023; 13:00	Chebbah 7	(12–16)	Nze Minko 8	Kastamonu Merkez Spor Salonu, Kastamonu; Attendance: 500; Referees: Lindenbaum, Laron (ISR)
5 February 2023; 13:00	1× (yellow card) 4× (suspension)	Report	1× (suspension)	Kastamonu Merkez Spor Salonu, Kastamonu; Attendance: 500; Referees: Lindenbaum, Laron (ISR)

11 February 2023; 18:00	Győri Audi ETO KC	29–28	(Denmark) Team Esbjerg	Audi Aréna, Győr; Attendance: 5,100; Referees: Sekulić, Jovandić (SRB)
11 February 2023; 18:00	Gros 7	(12–11)	Reistad 12	Audi Aréna, Győr; Attendance: 5,100; Referees: Sekulić, Jovandić (SRB)
11 February 2023; 18:00	5× (suspension)	Report	1× (yellow card) 5× (suspension)	Audi Aréna, Győr; Attendance: 5,100; Referees: Sekulić, Jovandić (SRB)

==== Results overview ====
Opposition	Home score	Away score	Double
(France) Metz Handball	24–28	29–28	52–57
(Romania) CS Rapid București	32–30	30–27	59–60
(Montenegro) Budućnost BEMAX	32–19	23–25	57–42
(Norway) Storhamar HE	39–26	21–35	74–47
(Denmark) Team Esbjerg	29–28	29–31	60–57
(Turkey) Kastamonu Bld. GSK	44–25	27–39	83–52
(Croatia) RK Lokomotiva Zagreb	32–16	16–27	59–32

==== Knockout stage ====
===== Quarter-finals =====
29 April 2023; 18:00	Odense Håndbold (Denmark)	27–29	Győri Audi ETO KC	Sydbank Arena, Odense; Attendance: 2,234; Referees: Budzák, Záhradník (SVK)
29 April 2023; 18:00	Abbingh, van Wetering 6	(17–12)	Gros 9	Sydbank Arena, Odense; Attendance: 2,234; Referees: Budzák, Záhradník (SVK)
29 April 2023; 18:00	4× (suspension)	Report	4× (suspension)	Sydbank Arena, Odense; Attendance: 2,234; Referees: Budzák, Záhradník (SVK)

6 May 2023; 18:00	Győri Audi ETO KC	37–28	(Denmark) Odense Håndbold	Audi Aréna, Győr; Attendance: 5,000; Referees: Merz, Kuttler (GER)
6 May 2023; 18:00	Gros 10	(21–14)	van Wetering 6	Audi Aréna, Győr; Attendance: 5,000; Referees: Merz, Kuttler (GER)
6 May 2023; 18:00	1× (yellow card) 2× (suspension)	Report	4× (suspension)	Audi Aréna, Győr; Attendance: 5,000; Referees: Merz, Kuttler (GER)

===== Semifinal =====
3 June 2023; 15:15	Győri Audi ETO KC	35–37	(Norway) Vipers Kristiansand	MVM Dome, Budapest; Attendance: 18,734; Referees: Covalciuc, Covalciuc (MDA)
3 June 2023; 15:15	Oftedal 11	(18–23)	Roberts 8	MVM Dome, Budapest; Attendance: 18,734; Referees: Covalciuc, Covalciuc (MDA)
3 June 2023; 15:15	1× (yellow card) 7× (suspension)	Report	3× (suspension)	MVM Dome, Budapest; Attendance: 18,734; Referees: Covalciuc, Covalciuc (MDA)

===== Bronze-match =====
4 June 2023; 15:15	Győri Audi ETO KC	28–27	(Denmark) Team Esbjerg	MVM Dome, Budapest; Attendance: 18,387; Referees: Hatipoğlu, Şimşek (TUR)
4 June 2023; 15:15	Gros 6	(16–9)	Ingstad 6	MVM Dome, Budapest; Attendance: 18,387; Referees: Hatipoğlu, Şimşek (TUR)
4 June 2023; 15:15	3× (suspension)	Report	1× (yellow card) 2× (suspension)	MVM Dome, Budapest; Attendance: 18,387; Referees: Hatipoğlu, Şimşek (TUR)

== Statistics ==
=== Top scorers ===
Includes all competitive matches. The list is sorted by shirt number when total goals are equal.

Position	Nation	No.	Name	Hungarian League	Hungarian Cup	Champions League	Total
1	(Slovenia)	9	Ana Gros	90	16	102	208
2	(France)	27	Estelle Nze Minko	104	15	68	187
3	(Sweden)	5	Linn Blohm	103	15	58	177
4	(Norway)	15	Stine Bredal Oftedal	70	8	71	149
5	(Hungary)	6	Nadine Schatzl	70	2	39	111
6	(Hungary)	22	Viktória Győri-Lukács	64	7	36	107
7	(Netherlands)	31	Yvette Broch	66	7	30	103
8	(Denmark)	8	Anne Mette Hansen	57	2	36	95
9	(South Korea)	11	Ryu Eun-hee	52	2	31	85
10	(Hungary)	23	Csenge Fodor	44	7	24	76
11	(Hungary)	48	Dorottya Faluvégi	46	5	21	72
12	(Norway)	21	Veronica Kristiansen	17	0	23	40
13	(Denmark)	2	Line Haugsted	13	5	12	30
14	(Norway)	7	Kari Brattset Dale	15	1	11	27
15	(Hungary)	81	Júlia Farkas	21	0	4	25
16	(Hungary)	4	Eszter Ogonovszky	12	0	3	15
17	(Norway)	16	Silje Solberg	3	0	2	5
18	(Montenegro)	80	Jelena Despotović	3	1	1	5
19	(France)	12	Amandine Leynaud	1	0	0	1
20	(Hungary)	17	Luca Kövér	1	0	0	1
21	(Denmark)	89	Sandra Toft	0	0	1	1
			TOTALS	854	93	573	1,520

=== Attendances ===
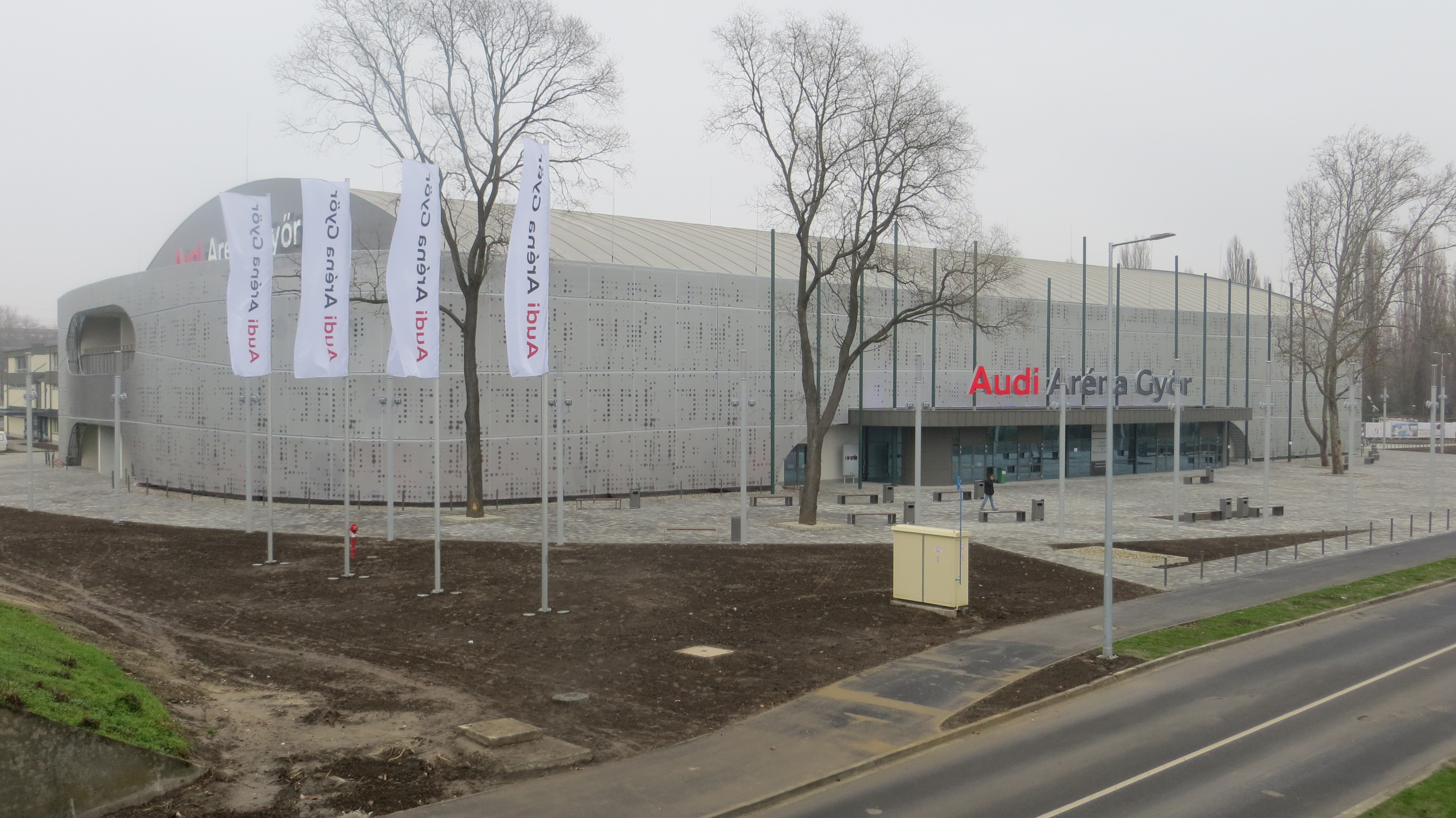
Home hall: Audi Aréna

List of the home matches:

Round	Against	Attendance	Capatility	Date
NB I- 1.	Budaörs	1,811	32,9%	September 2, 2022
NB I- 3.	Siófok	2,000	36,4%	September 14, 2022
CL-(GS) 2.	Kastamonu (Turkey)	2,817	51,2%	September 18, 2022
CL-(GS) 3.	Metz (France)	4,019	73,1%	September 24, 2022
NB I- 22.	Debrecen	1,894	34,4%	October 5, 2022
CL-(GS) 4.	Zagreb (Croatia)	2,047	37,2%	October 9, 2022
NB I- 5.	Balatonboglár	1,029	18,7%	October 19, 2022
CL-(GS) 6.	Podgorica (Montenegro)	3,379	61,4%	October 22, 2022
CL-(GS) 7.	Bucharest (Romania)	4,600	83,6%	December 3, 2022
NB I- 6.	Békéscsaba	1,027	18,7%	December 7, 2022
NB I- 21.	Kisvárda	1,137	20,7%	December 21, 2022
CL-(GS) 10.	Hamar (Norway)	4,179	76%	January 7, 2023
NB I- 10.	Dunaújváros	1,878	34,1%	January 11, 2023
NB I- 12.	MTK Budapest	1,907	34,8%	January 28, 2023
CL-(GS) 14.	Esbjerg (Denmark)	5,100	92,7%	February 11, 2023
NB I- 15.	Érd	1,251	22,7%	February 18, 2023
NB I- 17.	Vác	1,855	33,7%	March 11, 2023
NB I- 20.	Ferencváros	5,350	97,2%	April 1, 2023
CL-QF	Odense (Denmark)	5,000	90%	May 6, 2023
NB I- 24.	Székesfehérvár	1,821	33%	May 14, 2023
NB I- 26.	Mosonmagyaróvár	3,791	69%	May 27, 2023
