= Adéla Stříšková =

Czech handball player

Personal information
- Nationality: Czech
- Born: 14 December 2000 (age 25) Most, Czech Republic
- Height: 1.59 m (5 ft 3 in)

Sport
- Sport: Handball
- Position: Left wing
- Current club: DHK Baník Most
- Number: 9
National team
Years	Team	Apps	(Gls)
2019–	Czech Republic	46	(62)
- Updated on 23 April 2024

Adéla Stříšková (born 14 December 2000) is a Czech handball player for DHK Baník Most and the Czech national team.

She represented the Czech Republic at the 2020 European Women's Handball Championship.
