= Klara Birtić =

Croatian handballer (born 2002)

Personal information
- Nationality: Croatian
- Born: 28 March 2002 (age 24) Slavonski Brod, Croatia
- Height: 1.79 m (5 ft 10 in)

Sport
- Sport: Handball
- Position: Right back
- Current club: RK Podravka Koprivnica
- Number: 7

Senior clubs
- Years: Team
- –2022: ŽRK Split 2010
- 2022–2023: RK Lokomotiva Zagreb
- 2023–2024: SG BBM Bietigheim
- 2024–: RK Podravka Koprivnica
National team
Years	Team	Apps	(Gls)
2023–	Croatia	32	(85)
- Updated on 29 October 2026

Klara Birtić (born 28 March 2002) is a Croatian handballer for RK Podravka Koprivnica and the Croatian national team.

She represented Croatia at the 2023 World Women's Handball Championship and the 2024 European Women's Handball Championship.
