= Ana Malec =

Croatian handballer (born 2000)

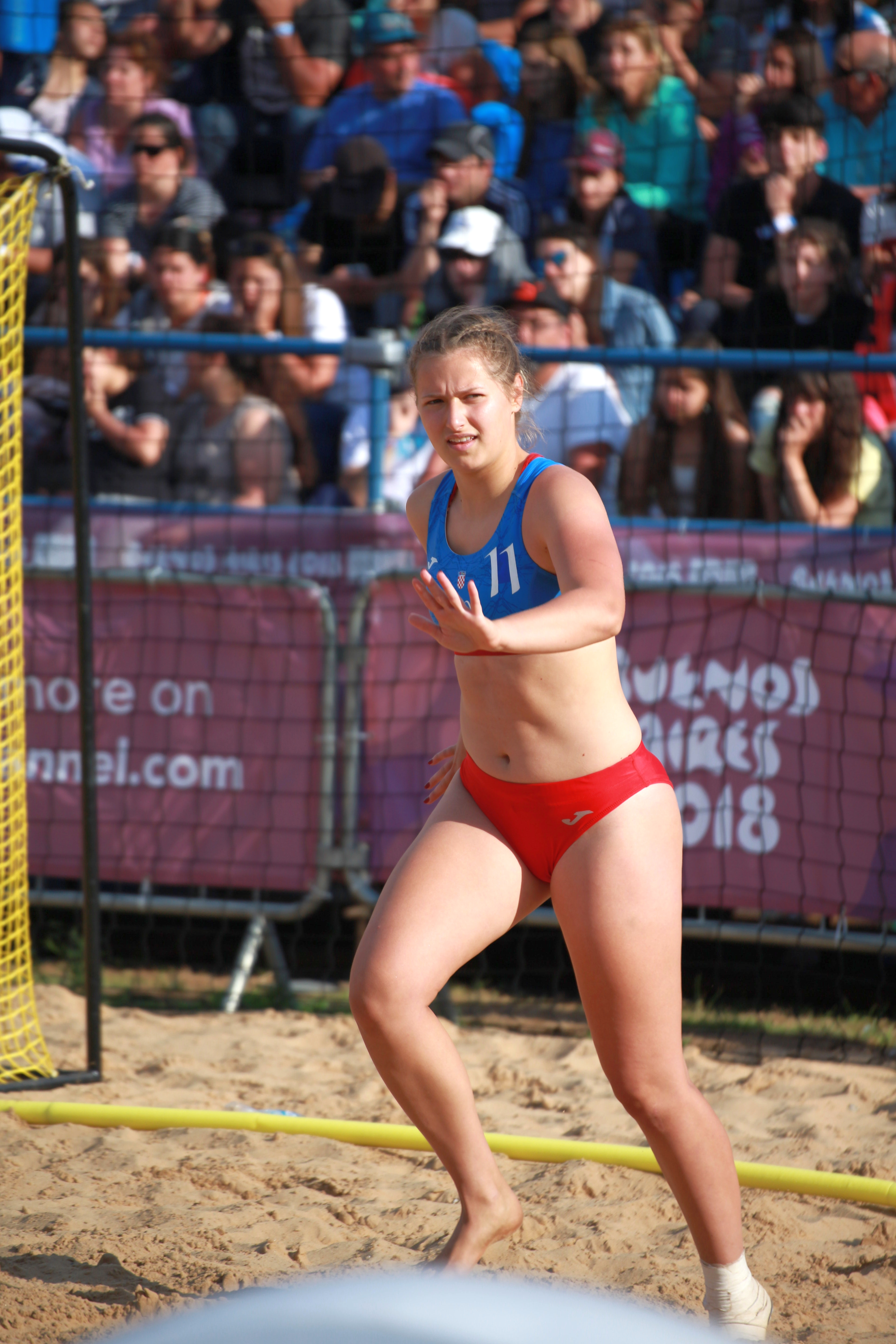

Personal information
- Nationality: Croatian
- Born: 25 July 2000 (age 26) Zagreb, Croatia
- Height: 1.74 m (5 ft 9 in)

Sport
- Sport: Handball
- Position: Centre back
- Current club: RK Lokomotiva Zagreb
- Number: 5

Senior clubs
- Years: Team
- ŽRK Ivanić
- 2020–2021: ŽRK Bjelovar
- 2021–: RK Lokomotiva Zagreb
National team
Years	Team	Apps	(Gls)
2022–	Croatia	5	(4)
Medal record
Mediterranean Games
Silver medal – second place	2022 Oran	Team
- Updated on 27 November 2025

Ana Malec (born 25 July 2000) is a Croatian handballer for RK Lokomotiva Zagreb and the Croatian national team.

She represented Croatia at the 2025 World Women's Handball Championship.
