= Csenge Fodor =

Hungarian handballer (born 1999)

Personal information
- Full name: Csenge Réka Fodor
- Nationality: Hungarian
- Born: 23 April 1999 (age 27) Keszthely, Hungary
- Height: 1.69 m (5 ft 7 in)

Sport
- Sport: Handball
- Position: Left wing
- Current club: Győri ETO KC
- Number: 23

Youth career
- Years: Team
- 2013–2017: NEKA

Senior clubs
- Years: Team
- 2017–: Győri ETO KC
National team
Years	Team	Apps	(Gls)
2021–2025	Hungary	10	(3)
Medal record
Junior World Championship
Gold medal – first place	2018 Hungary
Youth European Championship
Bronze medal – third place	2015 Macedonia

Csenge Fodor (born 23 April 1999) is a Hungarian professional handballer who plays for Győri ETO KC.

Before she became a player of Győr, she was part of the National Academy of Handball.

She made her international debut on 10 October 2021 against Slovakia.

== Achievements ==
National team

- IHF Women's Junior World Championship:
  - Gold: 2018
- EHF Youth European Championship:
  - Bronze: 2015

European competitions

- EHF Champions League:
  - Gold: 2018, 2019, 2024, 2025
  - Silver: 2022
  - Bronze: 2021, 2023

Domestic competitions

- Nemzeti Bajnokság I:
  - Gold: 2018, 2019, 2022, 2023, 2025
- Magyar Kupa:
  - Gold: 2018, 2019, 2021

== Personal life ==
She is in a relationship with her teammate Bruna de Paula. They got married in June 2026 in Brazil.
