= Tena Petika =

Croatian handballer (born 2000)

Personal information
- Nationality: Croatian
- Born: 16 June 2000 (age 26) Zagreb, Croatia
- Height: 1.90 m (6 ft 3 in)

Sport
- Sport: Handball
- Position: Left back
- Current club: ŽRK Zrinski Čakovec
- Number: 14

Senior clubs
- Years: Team
- –2019: RK Podravka Koprivnica
- 2019–2020: Kisvárdai KC
- 2020–2021: Békéscsabai Előre NKSE
- 2021–2023: RK Lokomotiva Zagreb
- 2023–2025: OGC Nice
- 2025: Dunaújvárosi Kohász KA
- 2025–2026: SV Union Halle-Neustadt
- 2026–: ŽRK Zrinski Čakovec
National team
Years	Team	Apps	(Gls)
2021–	Croatia	32	(43)
Medal record
Mediterranean Games
Silver medal – second place	2022 Oran	Team
- Updated on 19 November 2025

Tena Petika (born 16 June 2000) is a Croatian handballer for ŽRK Zrinski Čakovec and the Croatian national team.

She represented Croatia at the 2021 World Women's Handball Championship.

Her mother, Snježana Petika, is also a former handballer who played for Croatian national team.
