= 2022–23 Women's EHF Champions League =

Women's handball competition

Women's EHF Champions League
- 2022–23

Tournament information
- Sport: Handball
- Dates: 10 September 2022–4 June 2023
- Teams: 16
- Website: ehfcl.com

Final positions
- Champions: (Norway) Vipers Kristiansand
- Runner-up: (Hungary) FTC-Rail Cargo Hungaria

Tournament statistics
- Matches played: 131
- Goals scored: 7515 (57.37 per match)
- Attendance: 352,257 (2,689 per match)
- Top scorer(s): (Norway) Henny Reistad (142 goals)

The 2022–23 Women's EHF Champions League was the 30th edition of Europe's premier club handball tournament, running from 10 September 2022 to 4 June 2023.

Vipers Kristiansand won their third title in a row by defeating FTC-Rail Cargo Hungaria in the final.

== Format ==
The tournament was using the same format as the previous two seasons. The competition began with a group stage featuring sixteen teams divided into two groups. Matches were played in a double round-robin system with home-and-away fixtures, fourteen in total for each team. In Groups A and B, the top two teams automatically qualified for the quarter-finals, with teams ranked 3rd to 6th entering the playoff round.

The knockout stage included four rounds: the playoffs, quarter-finals, and a final-four tournament comprising two semifinals and the final. In the playoffs, eight teams were paired against each other in two-legged home-and-away matches (third-placed in group A plays sixth-placed group B; fourth-placed group A plays fifth-placed group B, etc.). The four aggregate winners of the playoffs advanced to the quarterfinals, joining the top-two teams of Groups A and B. The eight quarterfinalist teams were paired against each other in two-legged home-and-away matches, with the four aggregate winners qualifying to the final-four tournament.

In the final four tournament, the semifinals and the final were played as single matches at a pre-selected host venue. For this tournament, it was the MVM Dome.

== Team allocation ==
Location of teams of the 2022–23 Women's EHF Champions League group stage.
Red: Group A; Blue: Group B.

17 teams applied for a place, with nine having a fixed place. The final list was released on 27 June 2022.

Storhamar HE and CS Rapid București will make their debut appearances in the Champions League group stage, while RK Lokomotiva, DHK Baník Most and SG BBM Bietigheim make their return.

(Croatia) RK Lokomotiva Zagreb	(Czech Republic) DHK Baník Most	(Denmark) Odense Håndbold	(Denmark) Team Esbjerg
(France) Brest Bretagne Handball	(France) Metz Handball	(Germany) SG BBM Bietigheim	(Hungary) FTC-Rail Cargo Hungaria
(Hungary) Győri Audi ETO KC	(Montenegro) WHC Budućnost BEMAX	(Norway) Vipers Kristiansand	(Norway) Storhamar HE
(Romania) CS Rapid București	(Romania) CSM București	(Slovenia) RK Krim Mercator	(Turkey) Kastamonu Bld. GSK

Wildcard rejection
(Germany) Borussia Dortmund

== Group stage ==
The draw took place on 1 July 2022.

=== Group A ===
Pos	Team	Pld	W	D	L	GF	GA	GD	Pts	Qualification	VKR	BUC	ODE	FTC	KRI	BBR	BIE	MOS
1	(Norway) Vipers Kristiansand	14	11	1	2	456	373	+83	23	Quarterfinals	—	35–29	34–27	27–26	36–31	31–24	34–32	39–24
2	(Romania) CSM București	14	10	2	2	439	386	+53	22	Quarterfinals	27–24	—	40–31	30–24	30–28	30–30	28–28	40–25
3	(Denmark) Odense Håndbold	14	8	0	6	398	373	+25	16	Playoffs	24–34	27–31	—	25–28	26–22	25–24	31–24	41–22
4	(Hungary) FTC-Rail Cargo Hungaria	14	7	1	6	407	374	+33	15	Playoffs	26–26	29–33	27–23	—	37–26	20–21	28–23	43–19
5	(Slovenia) RK Krim Mercator	14	6	0	8	399	405	−6	12 (Note: Krim 6 Pts, +4 GD; Brest 3 Pts, 0 GD; Bietigheim 3 Pts, −4 GD)	Playoffs	21–27	28–26	23–29	30–32	—	24–22	35–28	42–31
6	(France) Brest Bretagne Handball	14	5	2	7	377	378	−1	12	Playoffs	29–36	26–33	21–25	24–21	22–24	—	32–28	31–26
7	(Germany) SG BBM Bietigheim	14	5	2	7	432	388	+44	12		32–30	25–27	24–27	40–20	30–23	25–25	—	47–25
8	(Czech Republic) DHK Baník Most	14	0	0	14	347	578	−231	0		21–43	26–35	19–37	27–46	29–42	30–46	23–46	—

Source: EHF
Rules for classification: Tiebreakers

=== Group B ===
Pos	Team	Pld	W	D	L	GF	GA	GD	Pts	Qualification	MET	GYO	ESB	BUC	BUD	SHE	KAS	LOK
1	(France) Metz Handball	14	12	1	1	429	352	+77	25	Quarterfinals	—	29–28	26–24	36–34	29–23	31–22	35–24	38–13
2	(Hungary) Győri Audi ETO KC	14	11	0	3	444	347	+97	22	Quarterfinals	24–28	—	29–28	32–30	32–19	39–26	44–25	32–16
3	(Denmark) Team Esbjerg	14	10	0	4	455	367	+88	20 (Note: Esbjerg 67–64 Rapid București)	Playoffs	35–28	29–31	—	35–30	30–20	35–25	39–31	33–20
4	(Romania) CS Rapid București	14	9	2	3	441	404	+37	20	Playoffs	32–32	30–27	34–32	—	39–29	27–25	28–22	27–22
5	(Montenegro) WHC Budućnost BEMAX	14	6	1	7	346	366	−20	13	Playoffs	28–36	22–25	23–28	30–30	—	24–23	10–0	25–18
6	(Norway) Storhamar Håndball Elite	14	4	0	10	377	406	−29	8	Playoffs	24–26	21–35	25–34	29–36	25–27	—	31–29	37–13
7	(Turkey) Kastamonu Bld. GSK	14	1	1	12	341	452	−111	3		23–28	27–39	27–43	26–33	27–40	28–33	—	26–23
8	(Croatia) RK Lokomotiva Zagreb	14	0	1	13	276	415	−139	1		18–27	16–27	18–30	27–31	24–25	22–31	26–26	—

Source: EHF
Rules for classification: Tiebreakers

== Knockout stage ==
=== Playoffs ===
Team 1	Agg.	Team 2	1st leg	2nd leg
Storhamar Håndball Elite (Norway)	52–60	(Denmark) Odense Håndbold	22–30	30–30
Brest Bretagne Handball (France)	49–55	(Denmark) Team Esbjerg	25–28	24–27
WHC Budućnost BEMAX (Montenegro)	46–55	(Hungary) FTC-Rail Cargo Hungaria	24–28	22–27
RK Krim Mercator (Slovenia)	53–54	(Romania) CS Rapid București	29–24	24–30

=== Quarterfinals ===
Team 1	Agg.	Team 2	1st leg	2nd leg
CS Rapid București (Romania)	56–71	(Norway) Vipers Kristiansand	25–31	31–40
FTC-Rail Cargo Hungaria (Hungary)	59–58	(France) Metz Handball	26–32	33–26
Team Esbjerg (Denmark)	65–59	(Romania) CSM București	32–28	33–31
Odense Håndbold (Denmark)	55–66	(Hungary) Győri Audi ETO KC	27–29	28–37

=== Final four ===
The final four will be held at the MVM Dome in Budapest, Hungary on 3 and 4 June 2023.

==== Bracket ====
Semi-finals
3 June
(Hungary) Győri Audi ETO KC	35
(Norway) Vipers Kristiansand	37
3 June
(Hungary) FTC-Rail Cargo Hungaria	30
(Denmark) Team Esbjerg	29

Final
4 June
(Norway) Vipers Kristiansand	28
(Hungary) FTC-Rail Cargo Hungaria	24
Third place
4 June
(Hungary) Győri Audi ETO KC	28
(Denmark) Team Esbjerg	27

==== Final ====
4 June 2023; 18:00	Vipers Kristiansand (Norway)	28–24	(Hungary) FTC-Rail Cargo Hungaria	MVM Dome, Budapest; Attendance: 20,022; Referees: Praštalo, Balvan (BIH)
4 June 2023; 18:00	Næs Andersen, Vyakhireva 6	(14–13)	Bölk, Lekić 5	MVM Dome, Budapest; Attendance: 20,022; Referees: Praštalo, Balvan (BIH)
4 June 2023; 18:00	1× (yellow card) 4× (suspension)	Report	1× (yellow card) 2× (suspension) 1× (red card)	MVM Dome, Budapest; Attendance: 20,022; Referees: Praštalo, Balvan (BIH)

== Top goalscorers ==
Rank	Player	Club	Goals
1	(Norway) Henny Reistad	(Denmark) Team Esbjerg	142
2	(Czech Republic) Markéta Jeřábková	(Norway) Vipers Kristiansand	118
2	(Romania) Cristina Neagu	(Romania) CSM București	118
4	(Hungary) Katrin Klujber	(Hungary) FTC-Rail Cargo Hungaria	114
5	(Slovenia) Ana Gros	(Hungary) Győri Audi ETO KC	99
6	(Germany) Emily Bölk	(Hungary) FTC-Rail Cargo Hungaria	92
6	(Netherlands) Angela Malestein	(Hungary) FTC-Rail Cargo Hungaria	92
6	(Montenegro) Jovanka Radičević	(Slovenia) RK Krim Mercator	92
9	(Norway) Anniken Obaidli	(Norway) Storhamar Håndball Elite	91
10	(Montenegro) Milena Raičević	(Montenegro) WHC Buducnost BEMAX	88
