= Bo van Wetering =

Dutch handball player (born 1999)

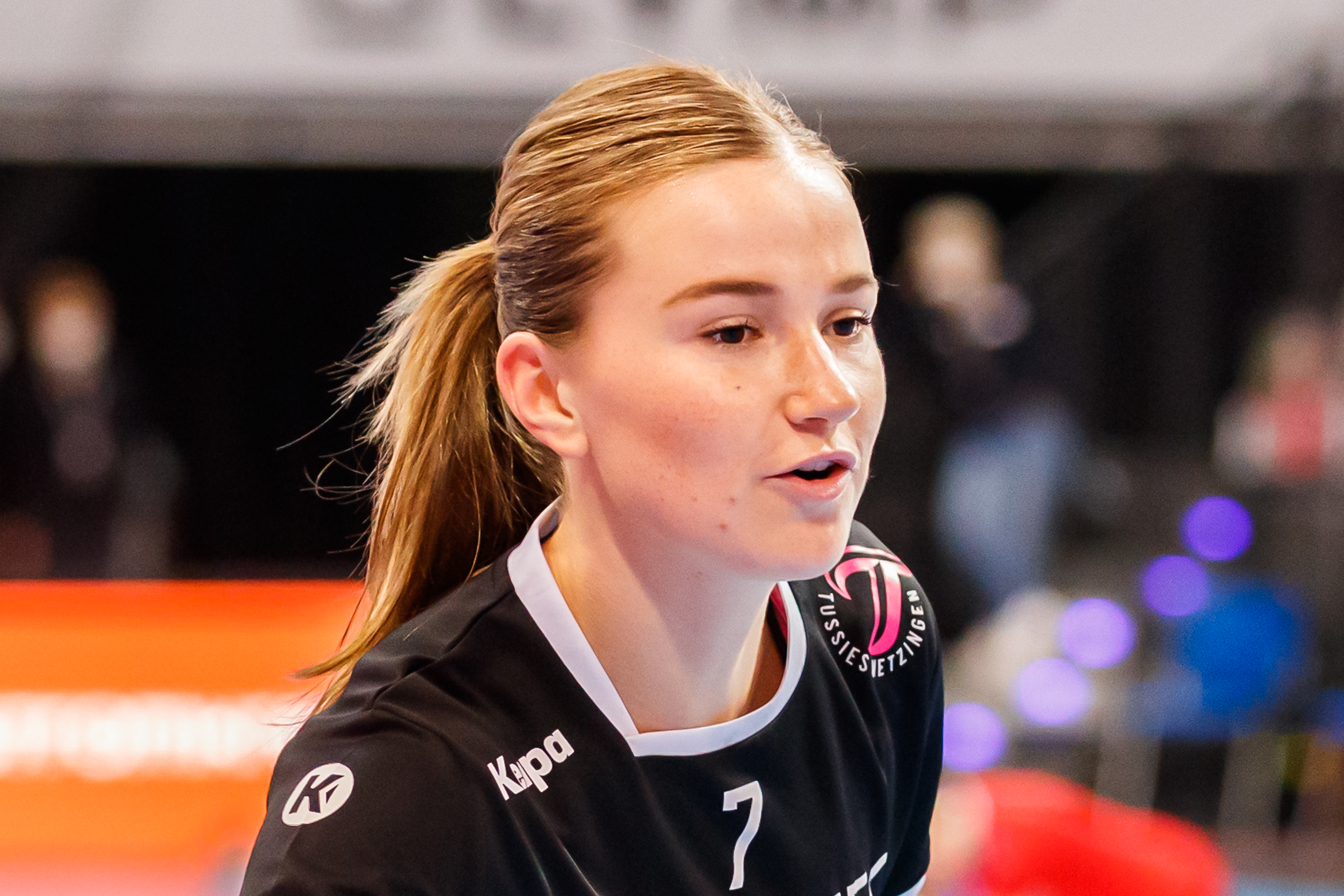

Personal information
- Nationality: Dutch
- Born: 5 October 1999 (age 27) Heerhugowaard, Netherlands
- Height: 1.72 m (5 ft 8 in)

Sport
- Sport: Handball
- Position: Left wing
- Current club: Győri ETO KC
- Number: 28

Youth career
- Years: Team
- –: HV Tornado
- –: VZV

Senior clubs
- Years: Team
- 2015–2016: Westfriesland SEW
- 2016–2019: VOC Amsterdam
- 2019–2021: TuS Metzingen
- 2021–2024: Odense Håndbold
- 2024–: Győri ETO KC
National team
Years	Team	Apps	(Gls)
2019–	Netherlands	128	(437)
Medal record
World Championship
Gold medal – first place	2019 Japan
- Updated on 9 April 2026

Bo van Wetering (born 5 October 1999) is a Dutch female handballer for Győri ETO KC and the Dutch national team.

She was a part the Netherlands team that won the 2019 World Women's Handball Championship; the first title in the country's history.

She is known for her speed and efficiency on counterattacks.

== Career ==
Bo van Wetering started playing handball at her hometown club HV Tornado. She later played for VZV before joining Westfriesland SEW. She debuted in the Eredivisie on 28 February 2015, at the age of only 15. A year later she joined league rivals VOC Amsterdam. Here she won the 2017 Eredivisie.

In 2019 she joined German Bundesliga team TuS Metzingen. She played here for two years before joining Danish team Odense Håndbold. With Odense she won the Danish League in 2021 and 2022.

In 2024 she joined Hungarian team Győri ETO KC together with fellow Dutch international Dione Housheer, who also joined from Odense Håndbold.

== National team ==
At the U-19 European Championship in 2017 Bo van Wetering was a part of the tournament all star team.

Her first major international tournament was the 2019 World Championship in Japan, where Netherlands won gold medals, beating Spain in the final 30:29

At the 2020 Olympics she also represented the Dutch team.

At the 2023 World Championship she and the Netherlands finished 5th. She scored 38 goals during the tournament.

== Achievements ==
- EHF Champions League:
  - Winner: 2025
- Eredivisie:
  - Winner: 2017
- Danish Handball League
  - Winner: 2021, 2022
- Nemzeti Bajnokság I:
  - Winner: 2025

== Awards and recognition ==
- All-Star Left Wing of the EHF Junior European Championship: 2017
