= Vanesa Agović =

Montenegrin handball player (born 1996)

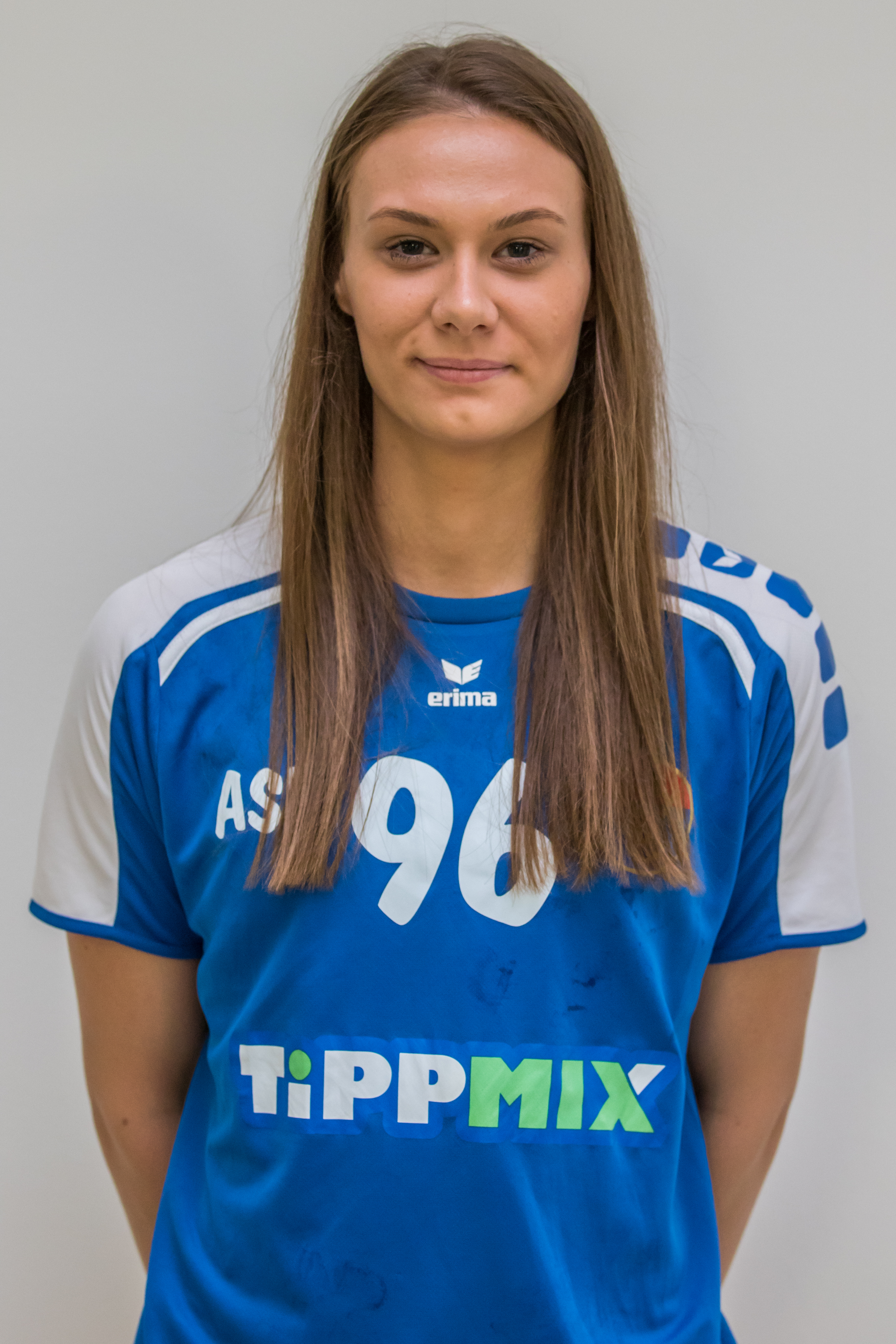

Personal information
- Nationality: Montenegrin
- Born: 30 March 1996 (age 30) Berane, Montenegro, FR Yugoslavia
- Height: 1.84 m (6 ft 0 in)

Sport
- Sport: Handball
- Position: Centre back
- Current club: ŽRK Budućnost
- Number: 33
National team
Years	Team	Apps	(Gls)
–	Montenegro	1	(0)
Medal record
Mediterranean Games
Silver medal – second place	2018 Tarragona	Team

Vanesa Agović (born 30 March 1996 in Berane, Montenegro) is a Montenegrin professional handball player who plays for the club ŽRK Budućnost Podgorica.

== Professional career ==
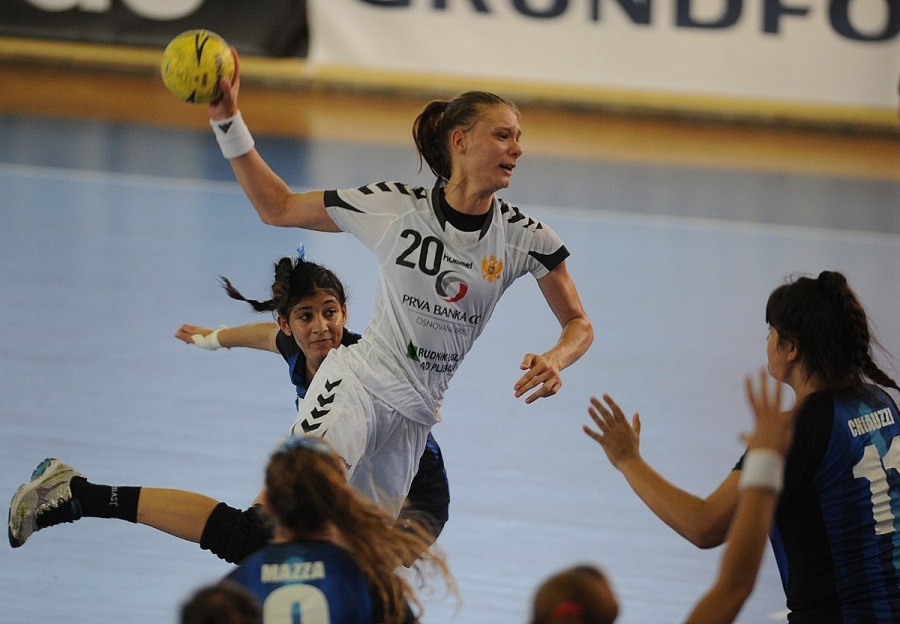

Agović has played for the Montenegro national team, in 2012 at under-14 level, in 2013 at under-16, where they finished in 5th place at the European championship in Poland and 1st place at the Mediterranean Games held in Montenegro, in 2014 at the under-16 World Championship in Macedonia, where they were 4th, in 2015 at under-18, and in 2018 for the senior team in Tarragona, Spain), where they finished 2nd.

Before she joined Vasas SC she played for Slagels HF, Frederiksberg IF, Viborg, WHC Danilovgrad, ZKR Buducnost Podgorica.

== Personal life ==
Her mother is the former montenegrin handball player, Maja Savić.
