= Blach =

Blach is a surname, from Old High German meaning "black". It can also be a Polish surname Błach derived from the diminutive for the given name Błażej, Blasius. Notable people with the name include:

- Arne Blach (1900–1977), Danish field hockey player
- Bent Blach Petersen
- Ejvind Blach (1895–1972), Danish field hockey player
- Helena Blach Lavrsen (born 1963), Danish curler and Olympic medalist
- Jørn Blach
- Natashia Blach, American actress
- Niels Blach (1893–1979), Danish field hockey player
- Oluf Blach
- Preben Blach
- Ty Blach (born 1990), American baseball pitcher
- Wiesław Błach, Polish judoka

== See also ==
- Blachman (disambiguation)
