= 2024–25 Women's EHF Champions League knockout stage =

Handball tournament knockout stage

The 2024–25 Women's EHF Champions League knockout stage began on 22 March with the playoffs and ended on 1 June 2025 with the final at the MVM Dome in Budapest, Hungary, to decide the winners of the 2024–25 Women's EHF Champions League. A total of twelve teams competed in the knockout phase.

== Format ==
In the playoffs, the eight teams ranked 3rd–6th in Groups A and B played against each other in two-legged home-and-away matches. The four winning teams advanced to the quarterfinals, where they are joined by the top-two teams of Groups A and B for another round of two-legged home-and-away matches. The four quarterfinal winners qualified for the final four tournament at the MVM Dome in Budapest, Hungary.

== Qualified teams ==
The top six teams from Groups A and B qualified for the knockout stage.

Group	Qualified for quarterfinals		Qualified for playoffs			
Group	First place	Second place	Third place	Fourth place	Fifth place	Sixth place
A	(France) Metz Handball	(Hungary) FTC-Rail Cargo Hungaria	(Romania) CSM București	(Slovenia) RK Krim Mercator	(Croatia) HC Podravka Vegeta	(Norway) Storhamar HE
B	(Hungary) Győri Audi ETO KC	(Denmark) Team Esbjerg	(Denmark) Odense Håndbold	(France) Brest Bretagne Handball	(Germany) HB Ludwigsburg	(Romania) CS Rapid București

== Playoffs ==
=== Overview ===
Team 1	Agg.	Team 2	1st leg	2nd leg
CS Rapid București (Romania)	46–62	(Romania) CSM București	24–34	22–28
Storhamar HE (Norway)	41–58	(Denmark) Odense Håndbold	20–33	21–25
HB Ludwigsburg (Germany)	54–47	(Slovenia) RK Krim Mercator	31–21	23–26
HC Podravka Vegeta (Croatia)	54–61	(France) Brest Bretagne Handball	27–26	27–35

==== Matches ====
22 March 2025; 18:00	CS Rapid București (Romania)	24–34	(Romania) CSM București	Sala Polivalentă, Bucharest; Attendance: 5,000; Referees: Ilieva, Karbeska (MKD)
22 March 2025; 18:00	Polman 6	(11–19)	Neagu 9	Sala Polivalentă, Bucharest; Attendance: 5,000; Referees: Ilieva, Karbeska (MKD)
22 March 2025; 18:00	2× (suspension)	Report	2× (yellow card) 3× (suspension)	Sala Polivalentă, Bucharest; Attendance: 5,000; Referees: Ilieva, Karbeska (MKD)

29 March 2025; 16:00	CSM București (Romania)	28–22	(Romania) CS Rapid București	Polyvalent Hall, Bucharest; Attendance: 4,500; Referees: Doychinov, Goretsov (BUL)
29 March 2025; 16:00	Omoregie 6	(11–11)	Janjušević 4	Polyvalent Hall, Bucharest; Attendance: 4,500; Referees: Doychinov, Goretsov (BUL)
29 March 2025; 16:00	3× (suspension)	Report	2× (suspension)	Polyvalent Hall, Bucharest; Attendance: 4,500; Referees: Doychinov, Goretsov (BUL)

CSM București won 62–46 on aggregate.

23 March 2025; 16:00	Storhamar HE (Norway)	20–33	(Denmark) Odense Håndbold	OBOS Arena, Hamar; Attendance: 1,827; Referees: Backović, Palacković (SLO)
23 March 2025; 16:00	Solås 4	(13–20)	Deila 9	OBOS Arena, Hamar; Attendance: 1,827; Referees: Backović, Palacković (SLO)
23 March 2025; 16:00	1× (yellow card) 4× (suspension)	Report	1× (yellow card) 3× (suspension)	OBOS Arena, Hamar; Attendance: 1,827; Referees: Backović, Palacković (SLO)

30 March 2025; 16:00	Odense Håndbold (Denmark)	25–21	(Norway) Storhamar HE	Sydbank Arena, Odense; Attendance: 2,180; Referees: Praštalo, Balvan (BIH)
30 March 2025; 16:00	Fauske, Aardahl 5	(16–11)	Solås 6	Sydbank Arena, Odense; Attendance: 2,180; Referees: Praštalo, Balvan (BIH)
30 March 2025; 16:00	1× (yellow card) 2× (suspension)	Report	2× (suspension)	Sydbank Arena, Odense; Attendance: 2,180; Referees: Praštalo, Balvan (BIH)

Odense Håndbold won 58–41 on aggregate.

23 March 2025; 14:00	HB Ludwigsburg (Germany)	31–21	(Slovenia) RK Krim Mercator	Arena Ludwigsburg, Ludwigsburg; Attendance: 1,271; Referees: Hatipoğlu, Şimşek (TUR)
23 March 2025; 14:00	Leuchter, Malá 5	(14–10)	Stanko 5	Arena Ludwigsburg, Ludwigsburg; Attendance: 1,271; Referees: Hatipoğlu, Şimşek (TUR)
23 March 2025; 14:00	1× (yellow card) 6× (suspension)	Report	2× (yellow card) 4× (suspension)	Arena Ludwigsburg, Ludwigsburg; Attendance: 1,271; Referees: Hatipoğlu, Şimşek (TUR)

30 March 2025; 14:00	RK Krim Mercator (Slovenia)	26–23	(Germany) HB Ludwigsburg	Tivoli Hall, Ljubljana; Attendance: 2,955; Referees: Barysas, Petrusis (LTU)
30 March 2025; 14:00	Gros 10	(10–11)	Leuchter 4	Tivoli Hall, Ljubljana; Attendance: 2,955; Referees: Barysas, Petrusis (LTU)
30 March 2025; 14:00	2× (suspension)	Report	1× (yellow card) 3× (suspension) 1× (red card)	Tivoli Hall, Ljubljana; Attendance: 2,955; Referees: Barysas, Petrusis (LTU)

HB Ludwigsburg won 54–47 on aggregate.

22 March 2025; 16:00	HC Podravka Vegeta (Croatia)	27–26	(France) Brest Bretagne Handball	Josip Samaržija-Bepo, Koprivnica; Attendance: 1,627; Referees: Lidacka, Lesiak (POL)
22 March 2025; 16:00	Pletikosić 8	(13–13)	Vyakhireva 6	Josip Samaržija-Bepo, Koprivnica; Attendance: 1,627; Referees: Lidacka, Lesiak (POL)
22 March 2025; 16:00	6× (suspension)	Report	1× (yellow card) 5× (suspension)	Josip Samaržija-Bepo, Koprivnica; Attendance: 1,627; Referees: Lidacka, Lesiak (POL)

29 March 2025; 18:00	Brest Bretagne Handball (France)	35–27	(Croatia) HC Podravka Vegeta	Brest Arena, Brest; Attendance: 4,020; Referees: Duplii, Pobedrina (UKR)
29 March 2025; 18:00	Mairot 7	(18–8)	Pletikosić 9	Brest Arena, Brest; Attendance: 4,020; Referees: Duplii, Pobedrina (UKR)
29 March 2025; 18:00	6× (suspension)	Report	6× (suspension)	Brest Arena, Brest; Attendance: 4,020; Referees: Duplii, Pobedrina (UKR)

Brest Bretagne Handball won 61–54 on aggregate.

== Quarterfinals ==
=== Overview ===
Team 1	Agg.	Team 2	1st leg	2nd leg
Brest Bretagne Handball (France)	58–62	(France) Metz Handball	26–29	32–33
HB Ludwigsburg (Germany)	46–54	(Hungary) Győri Audi ETO KC	24–25	22–29
Odense Håndbold (Denmark)	52–51	(Hungary) FTC-Rail Cargo Hungaria	27–27	25–24
CSM București (Romania)	52–55	(Denmark) Team Esbjerg	30–29	22–26

==== Matches ====
19 April 2025; 18:00	Brest Bretagne Handball (France)	26–29	(France) Metz Handball	Brest Arena, Brest; Attendance: 4,149; Referees: Xhema, Jahja (KOS)
19 April 2025; 18:00	Vyakhireva 8	(15–14)	Vámos 8	Brest Arena, Brest; Attendance: 4,149; Referees: Xhema, Jahja (KOS)
19 April 2025; 18:00	1× (yellow card) 2× (suspension)	Report	7× (suspension)	Brest Arena, Brest; Attendance: 4,149; Referees: Xhema, Jahja (KOS)

27 April 2025; 14:00	Metz Handball (France)	33–32	(France) Brest Bretagne Handball	Arènes de Metz, Metz; Attendance: 4,935; Referees: Weijmans, Wolbertus (NED)
27 April 2025; 14:00	Hansen 7	(15–13)	Ondono 8	Arènes de Metz, Metz; Attendance: 4,935; Referees: Weijmans, Wolbertus (NED)
27 April 2025; 14:00	3× (suspension)	Report	6× (suspension)	Arènes de Metz, Metz; Attendance: 4,935; Referees: Weijmans, Wolbertus (NED)

Metz Handball won 62–58 on aggregate.

19 April 2025; 16:00	HB Ludwigsburg (Germany)	24–25	(Hungary) Győri Audi ETO KC	Arena Ludwigsburg, Ludwigsburg; Attendance: 2,586; Referees: Vujačić, Kažanegra (MNE)
19 April 2025; 16:00	Leuchter 5	(14–16)	De Paula 7	Arena Ludwigsburg, Ludwigsburg; Attendance: 2,586; Referees: Vujačić, Kažanegra (MNE)
19 April 2025; 16:00	1× (yellow card) 3× (suspension)	Report	1× (yellow card) 4× (suspension)	Arena Ludwigsburg, Ludwigsburg; Attendance: 2,586; Referees: Vujačić, Kažanegra (MNE)

26 April 2025; 18:00	Győri Audi ETO KC (Hungary)	29–22	(Germany) HB Ludwigsburg	Audi Aréna, Győr; Attendance: 4,955; Referees: Metalari, Nikolovski (MKD)
26 April 2025; 18:00	Jørgensen 9	(13–10)	Gassama, Smits 4	Audi Aréna, Győr; Attendance: 4,955; Referees: Metalari, Nikolovski (MKD)
26 April 2025; 18:00	2× (yellow card) 5× (suspension)	Report	2× (yellow card) 2× (suspension)	Audi Aréna, Győr; Attendance: 4,955; Referees: Metalari, Nikolovski (MKD)

Győri Audi ETO KC won 54–46 on aggregate.

20 April 2025; 16:00	Odense Håndbold (Denmark)	27–27	(Hungary) FTC-Rail Cargo Hungaria	Sydbank Arena, Odense; Attendance: 2,187; Referees: Lovin, Stancu (ROU)
20 April 2025; 16:00	Elver 8	(14–12)	Malestein, Maslova 6	Sydbank Arena, Odense; Attendance: 2,187; Referees: Lovin, Stancu (ROU)
20 April 2025; 16:00	2× (suspension)	Report	2× (yellow card) 5× (suspension)	Sydbank Arena, Odense; Attendance: 2,187; Referees: Lovin, Stancu (ROU)

26 April 2025; 16:00	FTC-Rail Cargo Hungaria (Hungary)	24–25	(Denmark) Odense Håndbold	Érd Aréna, Érd; Attendance: 2,200; Referees: Antić, Jakovljević (SRB)
26 April 2025; 16:00	Bölk 5	(14–14)	Deila 6	Érd Aréna, Érd; Attendance: 2,200; Referees: Antić, Jakovljević (SRB)
26 April 2025; 16:00	2× (suspension)	Report	1× (yellow card) 4× (suspension)	Érd Aréna, Érd; Attendance: 2,200; Referees: Antić, Jakovljević (SRB)

Odense Håndbold won 52–51 on aggregate.

20 April 2025; 14:00	CSM București (Romania)	30–29	(Denmark) Team Esbjerg	Polyvalent Hall, Bucharest; Attendance: 4,300; Referees: Cipov, Klus (SVK)
20 April 2025; 14:00	Pintea 10	(13–15)	Reistad 11	Polyvalent Hall, Bucharest; Attendance: 4,300; Referees: Cipov, Klus (SVK)
20 April 2025; 14:00	1× (yellow card) 3× (suspension)	Report	2× (suspension)	Polyvalent Hall, Bucharest; Attendance: 4,300; Referees: Cipov, Klus (SVK)

27 April 2025; 16:00	Team Esbjerg (Denmark)	26–22	(Romania) CSM București	Blue Water Dokken, Esbjerg; Attendance: 2,760; Referees: Carmaux, Mursch (FRA)
27 April 2025; 16:00	Reistad 6	(14–12)	Pintea 5	Blue Water Dokken, Esbjerg; Attendance: 2,760; Referees: Carmaux, Mursch (FRA)
27 April 2025; 16:00	1× (yellow card) 2× (suspension)	Report	3× (suspension)	Blue Water Dokken, Esbjerg; Attendance: 2,760; Referees: Carmaux, Mursch (FRA)

Team Esbjerg won 55–52 on aggregate.

== Final four ==
The final four was held at the MVM Dome in Budapest, Hungary on 31 May and 1 June 2025. The draw took place on 28 April 2025.

=== Bracket ===
Semi-finals
31 May
(Hungary) Győri Audi ETO KC	29
(Denmark) Team Esbjerg	28
31 May
(France) Metz Handball	29
(Denmark) Odense Håndbold (ET)	31

Final
1 June
(Hungary) Győri Audi ETO KC	29
(Denmark) Odense Håndbold	27
Third place
1 June
(Denmark) Team Esbjerg	30
(France) Metz Handball	27

=== Semifinals ===
31 May 2025; 15:00	Győri Audi ETO KC (Hungary)	29–28	(Denmark) Team Esbjerg	MVM Dome, Budapest; Attendance: 17,500; Referees: Barysas, Petrusis (LTU)
31 May 2025; 15:00	Housheer 7	(17–15)	Reistad 7	MVM Dome, Budapest; Attendance: 17,500; Referees: Barysas, Petrusis (LTU)
31 May 2025; 15:00	1× (yellow card) 3× (suspension)	Report	3× (suspension)	MVM Dome, Budapest; Attendance: 17,500; Referees: Barysas, Petrusis (LTU)

31 May 2025
18:00
Metz Handball (France)
29–31 (ET)
(Denmark) Odense Håndbold
MVM Dome, Budapest
Attendance: 17,500
Referees: Lidacka, Lesiak (POL)
four players 5
(16–13)
Deila 6
4× (suspension)
Report
1× (yellow card) 5× (suspension) 1× (red card)

FT: 27–27 ET: 2–4

=== Third place game ===
1 June 2025; 15:00	Team Esbjerg (Denmark)	30–27	(France) Metz Handball	MVM Dome, Budapest; Attendance: 16,500; Referees: Duplii, Pobedrina (UKR)
1 June 2025; 15:00	Reistad 8	(17–16)	Bouktit 6	MVM Dome, Budapest; Attendance: 16,500; Referees: Duplii, Pobedrina (UKR)
1 June 2025; 15:00	5× (suspension) 1× (red card)	Report	5× (suspension)	MVM Dome, Budapest; Attendance: 16,500; Referees: Duplii, Pobedrina (UKR)

=== Final ===
1 June 2025; 18:00	Győri Audi ETO KC (Hungary)	29–27	(Denmark) Odense Håndbold	MVM Dome, Budapest; Attendance: 19,469; Referees: Mata, López (ESP)
1 June 2025; 18:00	three players 6	(20–15)	Højlund 5	MVM Dome, Budapest; Attendance: 19,469; Referees: Mata, López (ESP)
1 June 2025; 18:00	1× (yellow card) 2× (suspension)	Report	2× (suspension) 1× (red card)	MVM Dome, Budapest; Attendance: 19,469; Referees: Mata, López (ESP)
