= Blackman =

Blackman is an English-language surname. It is derived from the Middle English given name Blakman and the Old English Blæcmann, a combination of the words "black" and "man". Notable people with the surname include:

- Alexander Wayne Blackman, British Royal Marine known as 'Marine A', convicted of murdering a Taliban insurgent in 2011
- Andre Blackman (born 1990), British footballer
- Andrew Blackman (born 1965), Australian actor
- Ann Blackman (born 1946), American biographer
- Avion Blackman (born 1976), American reggae recording artist
- Aylward M. Blackman (1883–1956), British Egyptologist
- Bertie Blackman (born 1982), Australian singer, songwriter, and guitarist
- Betty Blackman (1931–2022), librarian and library dean from the United States
- Bob Blackman (American football) (1918–2000), American football player and coach
- Bob Blackman (politician) (born 1956), British politician (Harrow East; earlier London)
- Calvin Blackman Bridges (1889–1938), American geneticist
- Charles Blackman (1928–2018), Australian artist
- Cindy Blackman (born 1959), American musician
- Courtney Blackman (1933–2021), Barbadian economist, international business consultant, and diplomat
- Damon Blackmon (aka Dame Grease, born 1974), American video and music producer
- Don Blackman (1953–2013), American musician
- Eden Blackman (1957–2025), English media personality
- Eric G. Blackman (born 1968), American astrophysicist
- Fred Blackman (1884–after 1922), British footballer
- Frederick Blackman (1866–1947), British botanist (brother of Vernon Herbert Blackman; uncle of Geoffrey Emett Blackman)
- Garfield Blackman (given name of Ras Shorty I, 1941–2000), Trinidadian musician
- Geoffrey Emett Blackman (1903–1980), British botanist (son of Vernon Herbert Blackman; nephew of Frederick Blackman)
- George Blackman (1897–2003), Barbadian soldier in WWI
- Helena Blackman (born 1982), British actress
- Henry E. Blackman (born 1820), American politician and farmer
- Honor Blackman (1925–2020), British actress
- Jack Blackman (1920–1978), Australian footballer
- Jeremy Blackman (born 1985), American actor
- Joan Blackman (born 1938), American actress
- Joe Blackman (born 1984), British entrepreneur
- John Blackman (1947–2024), Australian radio and television presenter, and voice actor
- John Lucie Blackman (1793–1815), British soldier killed at the Battle of Waterloo
- Ken Blackman (born 1972), American professional football player
- Kirsty Blackman (born 1986), Scottish politician
- Lionel Blackman (born 1960), British solicitor advocate
- Liz Blackman (born 1949), British politician (Erewash)
- Lloyd Blackman (footballer) (born 1983), British footballer
- Lloyd Blackman (musician) (1928–2014), Canadian violinist, conductor, composer, and educator
- Lucie Blackman (?-2000), British club hostess, murdered by Joji Obara
- Luther Meade Blackman (1834–1919), American tombstone engraver, lawyer, politician, and farmer
- Malorie Blackman (born 1962), British author of juvenile fiction
- Margaret B. Blackman (born 1944), American anthropologist
- Moses Blackman (1908–1983), South African-born British crystallographer
- Nick Blackman (born 1989), British footballer
- Nicole Blackman (born 1971), American performance artist, poet, author, and vocalist
- Paul Blackman (born 1958), British theatrical producer and director
- Ralph Beebe Blackman (1904–1990), American mathematician and engineer
- Robert Blackman (born 1943), American costume designer
- Roberta Blackman-Woods (born 1957), British politician (City of Durham)
- Robyn Blackman (born 1959), New Zealander field hockey player, Olympian
- Rolando Blackman (born 1959), Panamanian basketball player and coach
- Steve Blackman (born 1963), American professional wrestler
- Ted Blackman (1942–2002), Canadian sports journalist
- Tim Blackman (born 1956), British academic and vice-chancellor of The Open University London
- Toni Blackman (born 1968), American rap artist, actress, and writer
- Thomas Blachman (born 1963), Danish jazz musician, music producer, and TV personality
- Vernon H. Blackman (1872–1967), British botanist
- William Blackman (1862–1885), British cricketer

== See also ==
- BlackMan's Art Gallery (1967–1974)
- Blackmon
- Blachman (disambiguation)
