= 2024–25 Women's EHF Champions League group stage =

The 2024–25 Women's EHF Champions League group stage was played between 7 September 2024 and 23 February 2025 to determine the twelve teams advancing to the knockout stage of the 2024–25 Women's EHF Champions League.

== Draw ==
The draw was held on 27 June 2024 in Vienna, Austria.

=== Seeding ===
The composition of the seeding pots for the group stage draw was announced on 25 June 2024.

| Pot 1 | Pot 2 | Pot 3 | Pot 4 |
|---|---|---|---|
| (Hungary) FTC-Rail Cargo Hungaria (Norway) Vipers Kristiansand (Denmark) Team Esbjerg (France) Metz Handball | (Romania) CSM București (Germany) HB Ludwigsburg (Slovenia) RK Krim Mercator (Montenegro) WHC Budućnost BEMAX | (Croatia) HC Podravka Vegeta (Hungary) Győri Audi ETO KC (Norway) Storhamar HE (Denmark) Nykøbing Falster Håndboldklub (France) Brest Bretagne Handball (Romania) CS Rapid București | (Denmark) Odense Håndbold (Romania) CS Gloria Bistrița |

== Format ==
In each group, teams played against each other in a double round-robin format, with home and away matches.

== Tiebreakers ==
In the group stage, teams were ranked according to points (2 points for a win, 1 point for a draw, 0 points for a loss). After completion of the group stage, if two or more teams had the same number of points, the ranking was determined as follows:

1. Highest number of points in matches between the teams directly involved;
2. Superior goal difference in matches between the teams directly involved;
3. Highest number of goals scored in matches between the teams directly involved;
4. Superior goal difference in all matches of the group;
5. Highest number of plus goals in all matches of the group;

If the ranking of one of these teams was determined, the above criteria were consecutively followed until the ranking of all teams was determined. If no ranking could be determined, a decision would have been obtained by EHF through drawing of lots.

== Groups ==
The matchdays were 7–8 September, 14–15 September, 21–22 September, 5–6 October, 12–13 October, 19–20 October, 9–10 November, 16–17 November 2024, 11–12 January, 18–19 January, 25–26 January, 8–9 February, 15–16 February and 22–23 February 2025.

=== Group A ===
| Pos | Team | Pld | W | D | L | GF | GA | GD | Pts | Qualification |
|---|---|---|---|---|---|---|---|---|---|---|
| 1 | (France) Metz Handball | 14 | 13 | 1 | 0 | 413 | 361 | +52 | 27 | Quarterfinals |
| 2 | (Hungary) FTC-Rail Cargo Hungaria | 14 | 12 | 0 | 2 | 395 | 351 | +44 | 24 | Quarterfinals |
| 3 | (Romania) CSM București | 14 | 9 | 0 | 5 | 414 | 383 | +31 | 18 | Playoffs |
| 4 | (Slovenia) RK Krim Mercator | 14 | 6 | 1 | 7 | 390 | 404 | −14 | 13 | Playoffs |
| 5 | (Croatia) HC Podravka Vegeta | 14 | 5 | 1 | 8 | 383 | 392 | −9 | 11 | Playoffs |
| 6 | (Norway) Storhamar HE | 14 | 3 | 2 | 9 | 351 | 377 | −26 | 8 | Playoffs |
| 7 | (Romania) CS Gloria Bistrița | 14 | 3 | 0 | 11 | 378 | 410 | −32 | 6 | |
| 8 | (Denmark) Nykøbing Falster Håndboldklub | 14 | 1 | 3 | 10 | 372 | 418 | −46 | 5 | |

Source: EHF
Rules for classification: Tiebreakers

| 7 September 2024; 16:00 | FTC-Rail Cargo Hungaria (Hungary) | 31–22 | (Denmark) Nykøbing Falster Håndboldklub | Érd Aréna, Érd; Attendance: 1,400; Referees: Vujačić, Kažanegra (MNE) |
| 7 September 2024; 16:00 | Dmitrieva 6 | (15–14) | Madsen 6 | Érd Aréna, Érd; Attendance: 1,400; Referees: Vujačić, Kažanegra (MNE) |
| 7 September 2024; 16:00 | 2× (suspension) | Report | 2× (suspension) | Érd Aréna, Érd; Attendance: 1,400; Referees: Vujačić, Kažanegra (MNE) |

| 7 September 2024; 16:00 | CS Gloria Bistrița (Romania) | 30–26 | (Romania) CSM București | TeraPlast Arena, Bistrița; Attendance: 2,803; Referees: Antić, Jakovljević (SRB) |
| 7 September 2024; 16:00 | three players 6 | (16–13) | Omoregie 9 | TeraPlast Arena, Bistrița; Attendance: 2,803; Referees: Antić, Jakovljević (SRB) |
| 7 September 2024; 16:00 | 1× (yellow card) 4× (suspension) | Report | 4× (suspension) | TeraPlast Arena, Bistrița; Attendance: 2,803; Referees: Antić, Jakovljević (SRB) |

| 7 September 2024; 18:00 | HC Podravka Vegeta (Croatia) | 23–24 | (Slovenia) RK Krim Mercator | Josip Samaržija-Bepo, Koprivnica; Attendance: 1,254; Referees: Lovin, Stancu (ROU) |
| 7 September 2024; 18:00 | Pandza 7 | (9–12) | Mavsar, Zaadi 5 | Josip Samaržija-Bepo, Koprivnica; Attendance: 1,254; Referees: Lovin, Stancu (ROU) |
| 7 September 2024; 18:00 | 3× (suspension) | Report | 6× (suspension) | Josip Samaržija-Bepo, Koprivnica; Attendance: 1,254; Referees: Lovin, Stancu (ROU) |

| 8 September 2024; 14:00 | Storhamar HE (Norway) | 29–29 | (France) Metz Handball | OBOS Arena, Hamar; Attendance: 1,137; Referees: Vranes, Wenninger (AUT) |
| 8 September 2024; 14:00 | Obaidli 7 | (12–14) | Bouktit 6 | OBOS Arena, Hamar; Attendance: 1,137; Referees: Vranes, Wenninger (AUT) |
| 8 September 2024; 14:00 | 1× (yellow card) 3× (suspension) | Report | 1× (yellow card) 4× (suspension) | OBOS Arena, Hamar; Attendance: 1,137; Referees: Vranes, Wenninger (AUT) |

| 14 September 2024; 16:00 | FTC-Rail Cargo Hungaria (Hungary) | 33–24 | (Croatia) HC Podravka Vegeta | Érd Aréna, Érd; Attendance: 1,450; Referees: Merisi, Pepe (ITA) |
| 14 September 2024; 16:00 | Kanor, Malestein 5 | (17–12) | Pandza 5 | Érd Aréna, Érd; Attendance: 1,450; Referees: Merisi, Pepe (ITA) |
| 14 September 2024; 16:00 | 3× (suspension) | Report | 1× (yellow card) 4× (suspension) | Érd Aréna, Érd; Attendance: 1,450; Referees: Merisi, Pepe (ITA) |

| 14 September 2024; 18:00 | RK Krim Mercator (Slovenia) | 35–25 | (Denmark) Nykøbing Falster Håndboldklub | Arena Stožice, Ljubljana; Attendance: 3,920; Referees: Carmaux, Mursch (FRA) |
| 14 September 2024; 18:00 | Gros 6 | (18–10) | Sprengers 6 | Arena Stožice, Ljubljana; Attendance: 3,920; Referees: Carmaux, Mursch (FRA) |
| 14 September 2024; 18:00 | 5× (suspension) | Report | 1× (suspension) | Arena Stožice, Ljubljana; Attendance: 3,920; Referees: Carmaux, Mursch (FRA) |

| 14 September 2024; 18:00 | Metz Handball (France) | 28–26 | (Romania) CS Gloria Bistrița | Arènes de Metz, Metz; Attendance: 2,644; Referees: Merz, Kuttler (GER) |
| 14 September 2024; 18:00 | Bouktit, Valentini 6 | (15–14) | So Delgado 8 | Arènes de Metz, Metz; Attendance: 2,644; Referees: Merz, Kuttler (GER) |
| 14 September 2024; 18:00 | 1× (yellow card) 2× (suspension) | Report | 2× (yellow card) 6× (suspension) | Arènes de Metz, Metz; Attendance: 2,644; Referees: Merz, Kuttler (GER) |

| 15 September 2024; 16:00 | CSM București (Romania) | 32–28 | (Norway) Storhamar HE | Polyvalent Hall, Bucharest; Attendance: 3,500; Referees: Duplii, Pobedrina (UKR) |
| 15 September 2024; 16:00 | Omoregie 8 | (17–15) | Rivas Toft 7 | Polyvalent Hall, Bucharest; Attendance: 3,500; Referees: Duplii, Pobedrina (UKR) |
| 15 September 2024; 16:00 | 2× (suspension) | Report | 3× (suspension) | Polyvalent Hall, Bucharest; Attendance: 3,500; Referees: Duplii, Pobedrina (UKR) |

| 21 September 2024; 16:00 | CS Gloria Bistrița (Romania) | 30–35 | (Slovenia) RK Krim Mercator | TeraPlast Arena, Bistrița; Attendance: 2,753; Referees: Vujačić, Kažanegra (MNE) |
| 21 September 2024; 16:00 | Kirdiasheva 9 | (19–20) | Gros 9 | TeraPlast Arena, Bistrița; Attendance: 2,753; Referees: Vujačić, Kažanegra (MNE) |
| 21 September 2024; 16:00 | 1× (suspension) | Report | 1× (yellow card) 3× (suspension) | TeraPlast Arena, Bistrița; Attendance: 2,753; Referees: Vujačić, Kažanegra (MNE) |

| 21 September 2024; 18:00 | HC Podravka Vegeta (Croatia) | 28–29 | (Romania) CSM București | Josip Samaržija-Bepo, Koprivnica; Attendance: 1,400; Referees: Hansen, Jensen (DEN) |
| 21 September 2024; 18:00 | Pletikosić, Šimara 8 | (10–14) | Kobylińska, Neagu 6 | Josip Samaržija-Bepo, Koprivnica; Attendance: 1,400; Referees: Hansen, Jensen (DEN) |
| 21 September 2024; 18:00 | 2× (yellow card) 4× (suspension) | Report | 2× (yellow card) 4× (suspension) | Josip Samaržija-Bepo, Koprivnica; Attendance: 1,400; Referees: Hansen, Jensen (DEN) |

| 22 September 2024; 14:00 | Storhamar HE (Norway) | 21–27 | (Hungary) FTC-Rail Cargo Hungaria | OBOS Arena, Hamar; Attendance: 1,187; Referees: Ilieva, Karbeska (MKD) |
| 22 September 2024; 14:00 | Venn 6 | (11–14) | Malestein 7 | OBOS Arena, Hamar; Attendance: 1,187; Referees: Ilieva, Karbeska (MKD) |
| 22 September 2024; 14:00 | 3× (suspension) | Report | 1× (yellow card) | OBOS Arena, Hamar; Attendance: 1,187; Referees: Ilieva, Karbeska (MKD) |

| 22 September 2024; 16:00 | Nykøbing Falster Håndboldklub (Denmark) | 27–28 | (France) Metz Handball | SPAR NORD Boxen, Nykøbing Falster; Attendance: 1,648; Referees: Altmár, Horváth (HUN) |
| 22 September 2024; 16:00 | Obaidli 9 | (15–19) | Granier 7 | SPAR NORD Boxen, Nykøbing Falster; Attendance: 1,648; Referees: Altmár, Horváth (HUN) |
| 22 September 2024; 16:00 | 4× (suspension) | Report | 2× (suspension) | SPAR NORD Boxen, Nykøbing Falster; Attendance: 1,648; Referees: Altmár, Horváth (HUN) |

| 5 October 2024; 16:00 | FTC-Rail Cargo Hungaria (Hungary) | 32–28 | (Romania) CS Gloria Bistrița | Érd Aréna, Érd; Attendance: 2,100; Referees: Praštalo, Balvan (BIH) |
| 5 October 2024; 16:00 | Lekić 7 | (18–10) | Mbengue 7 | Érd Aréna, Érd; Attendance: 2,100; Referees: Praštalo, Balvan (BIH) |
| 5 October 2024; 16:00 | 4× (suspension) | Report | 1× (yellow card) 5× (suspension) | Érd Aréna, Érd; Attendance: 2,100; Referees: Praštalo, Balvan (BIH) |

| 5 October 2024; 18:00 | Metz Handball (France) | 35–31 | (Croatia) HC Podravka Vegeta | Arènes de Metz, Metz; Attendance: 2,887; Referees: Duplii, Pobedrina (UKR) |
| 5 October 2024; 18:00 | Valentini 11 | (18–18) | Pandza 10 | Arènes de Metz, Metz; Attendance: 2,887; Referees: Duplii, Pobedrina (UKR) |
| 5 October 2024; 18:00 | 6× (suspension) | Report | 1× (yellow card) 10× (suspension) 2× (red card) | Arènes de Metz, Metz; Attendance: 2,887; Referees: Duplii, Pobedrina (UKR) |

| 5 October 2024; 18:00 | RK Krim Mercator (Slovenia) | 25–23 | (Norway) Storhamar HE | Arena Stožice, Ljubljana; Attendance: 3,715; Referees: Doychinov, Goretsov (BUL) |
| 5 October 2024; 18:00 | Horacek 7 | (11–12) | Venn 5 | Arena Stožice, Ljubljana; Attendance: 3,715; Referees: Doychinov, Goretsov (BUL) |
| 5 October 2024; 18:00 | 5× (suspension) | Report | 3× (suspension) | Arena Stožice, Ljubljana; Attendance: 3,715; Referees: Doychinov, Goretsov (BUL) |

| 6 October 2024; 16:00 | CSM București (Romania) | 27–26 | (Denmark) Nykøbing Falster Håndboldklub | Polyvalent Hall, Bucharest; Attendance: 3,966; Referees: Cipov, Klus (SVK) |
| 6 October 2024; 16:00 | Neagu 10 | (12–14) | Bardrum 6 | Polyvalent Hall, Bucharest; Attendance: 3,966; Referees: Cipov, Klus (SVK) |
| 6 October 2024; 16:00 | 2× (suspension) | Report | 1× (yellow card) 3× (suspension) | Polyvalent Hall, Bucharest; Attendance: 3,966; Referees: Cipov, Klus (SVK) |

| 12 October 2024; 16:00 | Nykøbing Falster Håndboldklub (Denmark) | 28–33 | (Norway) Storhamar HE | SPAR NORD Boxen, Nykøbing Falster; Attendance: 1,710; Referees: Sekulić, Jovandić (SRB) |
| 12 October 2024; 16:00 | Sprengers 6 | (17–16) | three players 7 | SPAR NORD Boxen, Nykøbing Falster; Attendance: 1,710; Referees: Sekulić, Jovandić (SRB) |
| 12 October 2024; 16:00 | 1× (yellow card) 1× (suspension) | Report | 2× (yellow card) 4× (suspension) | SPAR NORD Boxen, Nykøbing Falster; Attendance: 1,710; Referees: Sekulić, Jovandić (SRB) |

| 12 October 2024; 16:00 | CS Gloria Bistrița (Romania) | 25–29 | (Croatia) HC Podravka Vegeta | TeraPlast Arena, Bistrița; Attendance: 2,700; Referees: Lidacka, Lesiak (POL) |
| 12 October 2024; 16:00 | Fujita 6 | (7–13) | Pletikosić 9 | TeraPlast Arena, Bistrița; Attendance: 2,700; Referees: Lidacka, Lesiak (POL) |
| 12 October 2024; 16:00 | 2× (yellow card) 2× (suspension) | Report | 2× (yellow card) 7× (suspension) | TeraPlast Arena, Bistrița; Attendance: 2,700; Referees: Lidacka, Lesiak (POL) |

| 12 October 2024; 18:00 | Metz Handball (France) | 24–19 | (Hungary) FTC-Rail Cargo Hungaria | Arènes de Metz, Metz; Attendance: 3,512; Referees: Lovin, Stancu (ROU) |
| 12 October 2024; 18:00 | Bouktit, Valentini 5 | (11–11) | Dmitrieva 7 | Arènes de Metz, Metz; Attendance: 3,512; Referees: Lovin, Stancu (ROU) |
| 12 October 2024; 18:00 | 1× (yellow card) 3× (suspension) | Report | 2× (yellow card) 5× (suspension) | Arènes de Metz, Metz; Attendance: 3,512; Referees: Lovin, Stancu (ROU) |

| 12 October 2024; 18:00 | RK Krim Mercator (Slovenia) | 29–31 | (Romania) CSM București | Arena Stožice, Ljubljana; Attendance: 3,635; Referees: Altmár, Horváth (HUN) |
| 12 October 2024; 18:00 | Gros 10 | (15–19) | Omoregie 8 | Arena Stožice, Ljubljana; Attendance: 3,635; Referees: Altmár, Horváth (HUN) |
| 12 October 2024; 18:00 | 1× (suspension) | Report | 1× (suspension) | Arena Stožice, Ljubljana; Attendance: 3,635; Referees: Altmár, Horváth (HUN) |

| 19 October 2024; 16:00 | FTC-Rail Cargo Hungaria (Hungary) | 28–26 | (Slovenia) RK Krim Mercator | Érd Aréna, Érd; Attendance: 1,800; Referees: Braseth, Sundet (NOR) |
| 19 October 2024; 16:00 | Bölk, Dmitrieva 8 | (16–14) | Gros 11 | Érd Aréna, Érd; Attendance: 1,800; Referees: Braseth, Sundet (NOR) |
| 19 October 2024; 16:00 | 4× (suspension) | Report | 1× (yellow card) 2× (suspension) | Érd Aréna, Érd; Attendance: 1,800; Referees: Braseth, Sundet (NOR) |

| 19 October 2024; 16:00 | HC Podravka Vegeta (Croatia) | 27–27 | (Denmark) Nykøbing Falster Håndboldklub | Josip Samaržija-Bepo, Koprivnica; Attendance: 1,600; Referees: Weijmans, Wolbertus (NED) |
| 19 October 2024; 16:00 | Pletikosić 6 | (18–14) | Bardrum 9 | Josip Samaržija-Bepo, Koprivnica; Attendance: 1,600; Referees: Weijmans, Wolbertus (NED) |
| 19 October 2024; 16:00 | 1× (yellow card) 4× (suspension) 1× (red card) | Report | 1× (yellow card) 2× (suspension) | Josip Samaržija-Bepo, Koprivnica; Attendance: 1,600; Referees: Weijmans, Wolbertus (NED) |

| 20 October 2024; 14:00 | Storhamar HE (Norway) | 25–23 | (Romania) CS Gloria Bistrița | OBOS Arena, Hamar; Attendance: 1,159; Referees: Merisi, Pepe (ITA) |
| 20 October 2024; 14:00 | Obaidli 8 | (13–11) | So Delgado 6 | OBOS Arena, Hamar; Attendance: 1,159; Referees: Merisi, Pepe (ITA) |
| 20 October 2024; 14:00 | 1× (yellow card) 2× (suspension) | Report | 2× (yellow card) 3× (suspension) | OBOS Arena, Hamar; Attendance: 1,159; Referees: Merisi, Pepe (ITA) |

| 20 October 2024; 16:00 | CSM București (Romania) | 31–32 | (France) Metz Handball | Polyvalent Hall, Bucharest; Attendance: 4,700; Referees: Tzaferopoulos, Bethmann (GRE) |
| 20 October 2024; 16:00 | Kobylińska, Omoregie 7 | (16–19) | Axnér 8 | Polyvalent Hall, Bucharest; Attendance: 4,700; Referees: Tzaferopoulos, Bethmann (GRE) |
| 20 October 2024; 16:00 | 1× (yellow card) 1× (suspension) | Report | 1× (yellow card) 1× (suspension) | Polyvalent Hall, Bucharest; Attendance: 4,700; Referees: Tzaferopoulos, Bethmann (GRE) |

| 9 November 2024; 16:00 | Storhamar HE (Norway) | 23–25 | (Croatia) HC Podravka Vegeta | OBOS Arena, Hamar; Attendance: 962; Referees: Covalciuc, Covalciuc (MDA) |
| 9 November 2024; 16:00 | Obaidli 5 | (15–15) | Birtić 6 | OBOS Arena, Hamar; Attendance: 962; Referees: Covalciuc, Covalciuc (MDA) |
| 9 November 2024; 16:00 | 2× (suspension) | Report | 4× (suspension) | OBOS Arena, Hamar; Attendance: 962; Referees: Covalciuc, Covalciuc (MDA) |

| 9 November 2024; 16:00 | CS Gloria Bistrița (Romania) | 37–29 | (Denmark) Nykøbing Falster Håndboldklub | TeraPlast Arena, Bistrița; Attendance: 2,435; Referees: Doychinov, Goretsov (BUL) |
| 9 November 2024; 16:00 | three players 6 | (16–14) | Bardrum 6 | TeraPlast Arena, Bistrița; Attendance: 2,435; Referees: Doychinov, Goretsov (BUL) |
| 9 November 2024; 16:00 | 2× (suspension) | Report | | TeraPlast Arena, Bistrița; Attendance: 2,435; Referees: Doychinov, Goretsov (BUL) |

| 10 November 2024; 14:00 | RK Krim Mercator (Slovenia) | 25–34 | (France) Metz Handball | Arena Stožice, Ljubljana; Attendance: 4,235; Referees: Praštalo, Balvan (BIH) |
| 10 November 2024; 14:00 | Ngombele 5 | (13–15) | Valentini 8 | Arena Stožice, Ljubljana; Attendance: 4,235; Referees: Praštalo, Balvan (BIH) |
| 10 November 2024; 14:00 | 3× (suspension) | Report | 1× (yellow card) 5× (suspension) | Arena Stožice, Ljubljana; Attendance: 4,235; Referees: Praštalo, Balvan (BIH) |

| 10 November 2024; 16:00 | CSM București (Romania) | 26–28 | (Hungary) FTC-Rail Cargo Hungaria | Polyvalent Hall, Bucharest; Attendance: 4,200; Referees: Álvarez, Bustamante (ESP) |
| 10 November 2024; 16:00 | Omoregie 8 | (16–15) | Klujber 11 | Polyvalent Hall, Bucharest; Attendance: 4,200; Referees: Álvarez, Bustamante (ESP) |
| 10 November 2024; 16:00 | 2× (yellow card) 6× (suspension) | Report | 2× (yellow card) 4× (suspension) | Polyvalent Hall, Bucharest; Attendance: 4,200; Referees: Álvarez, Bustamante (ESP) |

| 16 November 2024; 16:00 | Nykøbing Falster Håndboldklub (Denmark) | 32–24 | (Romania) CS Gloria Bistrița | SPAR NORD Boxen, Nykøbing Falster; Attendance: 1,500; Referees: Braseth, Sundet (NOR) |
| 16 November 2024; 16:00 | Von Pereira 7 | (16–13) | Nosek 7 | SPAR NORD Boxen, Nykøbing Falster; Attendance: 1,500; Referees: Braseth, Sundet (NOR) |
| 16 November 2024; 16:00 | 3× (suspension) 1× (red card) | Report | 4× (suspension) | SPAR NORD Boxen, Nykøbing Falster; Attendance: 1,500; Referees: Braseth, Sundet (NOR) |

| 16 November 2024; 18:00 | Metz Handball (France) | 34–30 | (Slovenia) RK Krim Mercator | Arènes de Metz, Metz; Attendance: 4,312; Referees: Antić, Jakovljević (SRB) |
| 16 November 2024; 18:00 | Bouktit, Valentini 9 | (14–11) | Brnović, Radičević 6 | Arènes de Metz, Metz; Attendance: 4,312; Referees: Antić, Jakovljević (SRB) |
| 16 November 2024; 18:00 | 1× (suspension) | Report | 1× (yellow card) 4× (suspension) | Arènes de Metz, Metz; Attendance: 4,312; Referees: Antić, Jakovljević (SRB) |

| 16 November 2024; 18:00 | HC Podravka Vegeta (Croatia) | 25–24 | (Norway) Storhamar HE | Josip Samaržija-Bepo, Koprivnica; Attendance: 1,950; Referees: Vujačić, Kažanegra (MNE) |
| 16 November 2024; 18:00 | Birtić 6 | (14–12) | Rivas Toft 5 | Josip Samaržija-Bepo, Koprivnica; Attendance: 1,950; Referees: Vujačić, Kažanegra (MNE) |
| 16 November 2024; 18:00 | 1× (yellow card) 4× (suspension) | Report | 5× (suspension) | Josip Samaržija-Bepo, Koprivnica; Attendance: 1,950; Referees: Vujačić, Kažanegra (MNE) |

| 17 November 2024; 14:00 | FTC-Rail Cargo Hungaria (Hungary) | 31–28 | (Romania) CSM București | Érd Aréna, Érd; Attendance: 1,900; Referees: Carmaux, Mursch (FRA) |
| 17 November 2024; 14:00 | Dmitrieva, Klujber 6 | (17–18) | Omoregie 10 | Érd Aréna, Érd; Attendance: 1,900; Referees: Carmaux, Mursch (FRA) |
| 17 November 2024; 14:00 | 1× (suspension) | Report | 1× (yellow card) 3× (suspension) | Érd Aréna, Érd; Attendance: 1,900; Referees: Carmaux, Mursch (FRA) |

| 11 January 2025; 16:00 | Nykøbing Falster Håndboldklub (Denmark) | 28–31 | (Croatia) HC Podravka Vegeta | SPAR NORD Boxen, Nykøbing Falster; Attendance: 1,375; Referees: Panayides, Andreou (CYP) |
| 11 January 2025; 16:00 | Von Pereira 7 | (13–13) | Brkić 8 | SPAR NORD Boxen, Nykøbing Falster; Attendance: 1,375; Referees: Panayides, Andreou (CYP) |
| 11 January 2025; 16:00 | 1× (yellow card) 7× (suspension) | Report | 8× (suspension) | SPAR NORD Boxen, Nykøbing Falster; Attendance: 1,375; Referees: Panayides, Andreou (CYP) |

| 11 January 2025; 16:00 | CS Gloria Bistrița (Romania) | 31–28 | (Norway) Storhamar HE | TeraPlast Arena, Bistrița; Attendance: 2,653; Referees: Weijmans, Wolbertus (NED) |
| 11 January 2025; 16:00 | So Delgado 7 | (13–15) | Rivas Toft, Solås 6 | TeraPlast Arena, Bistrița; Attendance: 2,653; Referees: Weijmans, Wolbertus (NED) |
| 11 January 2025; 16:00 | 1× (yellow card) 2× (suspension) | Report | 1× (suspension) | TeraPlast Arena, Bistrița; Attendance: 2,653; Referees: Weijmans, Wolbertus (NED) |

| 11 January 2025; 18:00 | RK Krim Mercator (Slovenia) | 22–27 | (Hungary) FTC-Rail Cargo Hungaria | Arena Stožice, Ljubljana; Attendance: 3,620; Referees: Metalari, Nikolovski (MKD) |
| 11 January 2025; 18:00 | Gros 6 | (11–15) | three players 5 | Arena Stožice, Ljubljana; Attendance: 3,620; Referees: Metalari, Nikolovski (MKD) |
| 11 January 2025; 18:00 | 5× (suspension) 1× (red card) | Report | 3× (suspension) | Arena Stožice, Ljubljana; Attendance: 3,620; Referees: Metalari, Nikolovski (MKD) |

| 12 January 2025; 16:00 | Metz Handball (France) | 27–24 | (Romania) CSM București | Arènes de Metz, Metz; Attendance: 5,005; Referees: Lidacka, Lesiak (POL) |
| 12 January 2025; 16:00 | Bouktit 7 | (13–12) | Neagu 6 | Arènes de Metz, Metz; Attendance: 5,005; Referees: Lidacka, Lesiak (POL) |
| 12 January 2025; 16:00 | 3× (suspension) | Report | 4× (suspension) | Arènes de Metz, Metz; Attendance: 5,005; Referees: Lidacka, Lesiak (POL) |

| 18 January 2025; 16:00 | FTC-Rail Cargo Hungaria (Hungary) | 23–26 | (France) Metz Handball | Érd Aréna, Érd; Attendance: 2,200; Referees: Xhema, Jahja (KOS) |
| 18 January 2025; 16:00 | Klujber, Malestein 6 | (11–13) | Vámos 8 | Érd Aréna, Érd; Attendance: 2,200; Referees: Xhema, Jahja (KOS) |
| 18 January 2025; 16:00 | 1× (yellow card) 7× (suspension) | Report | 5× (suspension) | Érd Aréna, Érd; Attendance: 2,200; Referees: Xhema, Jahja (KOS) |

| 18 January 2025; 16:00 | CSM București (Romania) | 36–23 | (Slovenia) RK Krim Mercator | Polyvalent Hall, Bucharest; Attendance: 4,100; Referees: Thiyagarajah, Thiyagarajah (GER) |
| 18 January 2025; 16:00 | Neagu 11 | (17–8) | Horacek 7 | Polyvalent Hall, Bucharest; Attendance: 4,100; Referees: Thiyagarajah, Thiyagarajah (GER) |
| 18 January 2025; 16:00 | 1× (suspension) | Report | 1× (yellow card) 4× (suspension) | Polyvalent Hall, Bucharest; Attendance: 4,100; Referees: Thiyagarajah, Thiyagarajah (GER) |

| 18 January 2025; 18:00 | HC Podravka Vegeta (Croatia) | 26–25 | (Romania) CS Gloria Bistrița | Josip Samaržija-Bepo, Koprivnica; Attendance: 1,800; Referees: Ilieva, Karbeska (MKD) |
| 18 January 2025; 18:00 | Mamić 8 | (15–15) | Mbengue, So Delgado 7 | Josip Samaržija-Bepo, Koprivnica; Attendance: 1,800; Referees: Ilieva, Karbeska (MKD) |
| 18 January 2025; 18:00 | 2× (yellow card) 3× (suspension) | Report | 1× (yellow card) 4× (suspension) | Josip Samaržija-Bepo, Koprivnica; Attendance: 1,800; Referees: Ilieva, Karbeska (MKD) |

| 19 January 2025; 14:00 | Storhamar HE (Norway) | 22–22 | (Denmark) Nykøbing Falster Håndboldklub | OBOS Arena, Hamar; Attendance: 927; Referees: Barysas, Petrusis (LTU) |
| 19 January 2025; 14:00 | Venn 5 | (12–9) | Bardrum 7 | OBOS Arena, Hamar; Attendance: 927; Referees: Barysas, Petrusis (LTU) |
| 19 January 2025; 14:00 | 4× (suspension) | Report | 2× (suspension) | OBOS Arena, Hamar; Attendance: 927; Referees: Barysas, Petrusis (LTU) |

| 25 January 2025; 16:00 | HC Podravka Vegeta (Croatia) | 26–28 | (France) Metz Handball | Josip Samaržija-Bepo, Koprivnica; Attendance: 1,800; Referees: Doychinov, Goretsov (BUL) |
| 25 January 2025; 16:00 | Mamić 5 | (9–14) | Granier, Vámos 6 | Josip Samaržija-Bepo, Koprivnica; Attendance: 1,800; Referees: Doychinov, Goretsov (BUL) |
| 25 January 2025; 16:00 | 1× (yellow card) 5× (suspension) | Report | 1× (yellow card) 3× (suspension) | Josip Samaržija-Bepo, Koprivnica; Attendance: 1,800; Referees: Doychinov, Goretsov (BUL) |

| 25 January 2025; 16:00 | CS Gloria Bistrița (Romania) | 23–26 | (Hungary) FTC-Rail Cargo Hungaria | TeraPlast Arena, Bistrița; Attendance: 2,810; Referees: Brkic, Jusufhodzic (AUT) |
| 25 January 2025; 16:00 | Bazaliu 11 | (11–12) | Malestein 6 | TeraPlast Arena, Bistrița; Attendance: 2,810; Referees: Brkic, Jusufhodzic (AUT) |
| 25 January 2025; 16:00 | 1× (suspension) | Report | 2× (suspension) | TeraPlast Arena, Bistrița; Attendance: 2,810; Referees: Brkic, Jusufhodzic (AUT) |

| 26 January 2025; 14:00 | Storhamar HE (Norway) | 29–28 | (Slovenia) RK Krim Mercator | OBOS Arena, Hamar; Attendance: 830; Referees: Kull, Tint (EST) |
| 26 January 2025; 14:00 | Obaidli, Rivas Toft 7 | (14–11) | Gros 7 | OBOS Arena, Hamar; Attendance: 830; Referees: Kull, Tint (EST) |
| 26 January 2025; 14:00 | 1× (suspension) | Report | 1× (yellow card) 4× (suspension) | OBOS Arena, Hamar; Attendance: 830; Referees: Kull, Tint (EST) |

| 26 January 2025; 14:00 | Nykøbing Falster Håndboldklub (Denmark) | 27–29 | (Romania) CSM București | SPAR NORD Boxen, Nykøbing Falster; Attendance: 2,075; Referees: Praštalo, Balvan (BIH) |
| 26 January 2025; 14:00 | Vestergaard, Von Pereira 5 | (10–15) | Neagu 7 | SPAR NORD Boxen, Nykøbing Falster; Attendance: 2,075; Referees: Praštalo, Balvan (BIH) |
| 26 January 2025; 14:00 | 1× (yellow card) | Report | 1× (yellow card) 2× (suspension) | SPAR NORD Boxen, Nykøbing Falster; Attendance: 2,075; Referees: Praštalo, Balvan (BIH) |

| 8 February 2025; 16:00 | FTC-Rail Cargo Hungaria (Hungary) | 26–25 | (Norway) Storhamar HE | Érd Aréna, Érd; Attendance: 2,100; Referees: Duplii, Pobedrina (UKR) |
| 8 February 2025; 16:00 | four players 4 | (16–10) | Obaidli 9 | Érd Aréna, Érd; Attendance: 2,100; Referees: Duplii, Pobedrina (UKR) |
| 8 February 2025; 16:00 | 3× (suspension) | Report | 3× (suspension) | Érd Aréna, Érd; Attendance: 2,100; Referees: Duplii, Pobedrina (UKR) |

| 8 February 2025; 18:00 | Metz Handball (France) | 30–22 | (Denmark) Nykøbing Falster Håndboldklub | Arènes de Metz, Metz; Attendance: 3,717; Referees: Ilieva, Karbeska (MKD) |
| 8 February 2025; 18:00 | Bouktit 9 | (16–13) | Bardrum 5 | Arènes de Metz, Metz; Attendance: 3,717; Referees: Ilieva, Karbeska (MKD) |
| 8 February 2025; 18:00 | 1× (yellow card) 2× (suspension) | Report | 3× (yellow card) 4× (suspension) | Arènes de Metz, Metz; Attendance: 3,717; Referees: Ilieva, Karbeska (MKD) |

| 8 February 2025; 18:00 | RK Krim Mercator (Slovenia) | 28–25 | (Romania) CS Gloria Bistrița | Arena Stožice, Ljubljana; Attendance: 4,211; Referees: Cipov, Klus (SVK) |
| 8 February 2025; 18:00 | Horacek 10 | (12–13) | Nocuń 7 | Arena Stožice, Ljubljana; Attendance: 4,211; Referees: Cipov, Klus (SVK) |
| 8 February 2025; 18:00 | 1× (yellow card) 5× (suspension) | Report | 4× (suspension) | Arena Stožice, Ljubljana; Attendance: 4,211; Referees: Cipov, Klus (SVK) |

| 9 February 2025; 16:00 | CSM București (Romania) | 31–30 | (Croatia) HC Podravka Vegeta | Polyvalent Hall, Bucharest; Attendance: 4,500; Referees: Altmár, Horváth (HUN) |
| 9 February 2025; 16:00 | Neagu 8 | (16–16) | Pandza, Pletikosić 5 | Polyvalent Hall, Bucharest; Attendance: 4,500; Referees: Altmár, Horváth (HUN) |
| 9 February 2025; 16:00 | 6× (suspension) | Report | 1× (yellow card) 6× (suspension) | Polyvalent Hall, Bucharest; Attendance: 4,500; Referees: Altmár, Horváth (HUN) |

| 15 February 2025; 16:00 | Nykøbing Falster Håndboldklub (Denmark) | 30–30 | (Slovenia) RK Krim Mercator | SPAR NORD Boxen, Nykøbing Falster; Attendance: 1,429; Referees: Vujačić, Kažanegra (MNE) |
| 15 February 2025; 16:00 | Bardrum 9 | (14–19) | Gros 8 | SPAR NORD Boxen, Nykøbing Falster; Attendance: 1,429; Referees: Vujačić, Kažanegra (MNE) |
| 15 February 2025; 16:00 | 1× (suspension) | Report | 4× (suspension) | SPAR NORD Boxen, Nykøbing Falster; Attendance: 1,429; Referees: Vujačić, Kažanegra (MNE) |

| 15 February 2025; 16:00 | HC Podravka Vegeta (Croatia) | 29–30 | (Hungary) FTC-Rail Cargo Hungaria | Josip Samaržija-Bepo, Koprivnica; Attendance: 2,000; Referees: Praštalo, Balvan (BIH) |
| 15 February 2025; 16:00 | Barišić 7 | (18–14) | Malestein 6 | Josip Samaržija-Bepo, Koprivnica; Attendance: 2,000; Referees: Praštalo, Balvan (BIH) |
| 15 February 2025; 16:00 | 1× (yellow card) 2× (suspension) | Report | 1× (yellow card) 4× (suspension) | Josip Samaržija-Bepo, Koprivnica; Attendance: 2,000; Referees: Praštalo, Balvan (BIH) |

| 15 February 2025; 16:00 | CS Gloria Bistrița (Romania) | 28–34 | (France) Metz Handball | TeraPlast Arena, Bistrița; Attendance: 2,652; Referees: Panayides, Andreou (CYP) |
| 15 February 2025; 16:00 | So Delgado 7 | (12–18) | Bouktit 7 | TeraPlast Arena, Bistrița; Attendance: 2,652; Referees: Panayides, Andreou (CYP) |
| 15 February 2025; 16:00 | 2× (yellow card) 1× (suspension) | Report | 2× (yellow card) 4× (suspension) | TeraPlast Arena, Bistrița; Attendance: 2,652; Referees: Panayides, Andreou (CYP) |

| 16 February 2025; 14:00 | Storhamar HE (Norway) | 21–32 | (Romania) CSM București | OBOS Arena, Hamar; Attendance: 1,227; Referees: Hatipoğlu, Şimşek (TUR) |
| 16 February 2025; 14:00 | Obaidli, Rivas Toft 4 | (11–14) | Pintea 10 | OBOS Arena, Hamar; Attendance: 1,227; Referees: Hatipoğlu, Şimşek (TUR) |
| 16 February 2025; 14:00 | 2× (yellow card) 3× (suspension) | Report | 1× (yellow card) 4× (suspension) | OBOS Arena, Hamar; Attendance: 1,227; Referees: Hatipoğlu, Şimşek (TUR) |

| 22 February 2025; 16:00 | CSM București (Romania) | 32–23 | (Romania) CS Gloria Bistrița | Polyvalent Hall, Bucharest; Attendance: 4,400; Referees: Duplii, Pobedrina (UKR) |
| 22 February 2025; 16:00 | Pintea 8 | (17–10) | Mbengue 5 | Polyvalent Hall, Bucharest; Attendance: 4,400; Referees: Duplii, Pobedrina (UKR) |
| 22 February 2025; 16:00 | 3× (suspension) | Report | 1× (yellow card) 4× (suspension) | Polyvalent Hall, Bucharest; Attendance: 4,400; Referees: Duplii, Pobedrina (UKR) |

| 22 February 2025; 16:00 | Nykøbing Falster Håndboldklub (Denmark) | 27–34 | (Hungary) FTC-Rail Cargo Hungaria | SPAR NORD Boxen, Nykøbing Falster; Attendance: 1,734; Referees: Jakovljević, Kovačević (SRB) |
| 22 February 2025; 16:00 | Obaidli 7 | (15–18) | Malestein 9 | SPAR NORD Boxen, Nykøbing Falster; Attendance: 1,734; Referees: Jakovljević, Kovačević (SRB) |
| 22 February 2025; 16:00 | 1× (yellow card) 2× (suspension) | Report | 1× (yellow card) 6× (suspension) | SPAR NORD Boxen, Nykøbing Falster; Attendance: 1,734; Referees: Jakovljević, Kovačević (SRB) |

| 22 February 2025; 18:00 | Metz Handball (France) | 24–20 | (Norway) Storhamar HE | Arènes de Metz, Metz; Attendance: 4,228; Referees: Metalari, Nikolovski (MKD) |
| 22 February 2025; 18:00 | Mlamali 7 | (14–11) | Rivas Toft 7 | Arènes de Metz, Metz; Attendance: 4,228; Referees: Metalari, Nikolovski (MKD) |
| 22 February 2025; 18:00 | 1× (suspension) | Report | 1× (yellow card) 3× (suspension) 1× (red card) | Arènes de Metz, Metz; Attendance: 4,228; Referees: Metalari, Nikolovski (MKD) |

| 22 February 2025; 18:00 | RK Krim Mercator (Slovenia) | 30–29 | (Croatia) HC Podravka Vegeta | Arena Stožice, Ljubljana; Attendance: 3,260; Referees: Xhema, Jahja (KOS) |
| 22 February 2025; 18:00 | Radičević 9 | (11–12) | Pletikosić 7 | Arena Stožice, Ljubljana; Attendance: 3,260; Referees: Xhema, Jahja (KOS) |
| 22 February 2025; 18:00 | 2× (yellow card) 5× (suspension) | Report | 1× (yellow card) 3× (suspension) | Arena Stožice, Ljubljana; Attendance: 3,260; Referees: Xhema, Jahja (KOS) |

=== Group B ===
| Pos | Team | Pld | W | D | L | GF | GA | GD | Pts | Qualification |
|---|---|---|---|---|---|---|---|---|---|---|
| 1 | (Hungary) Győri Audi ETO KC | 14 | 12 | 1 | 1 | 397 | 333 | +64 | 25 | Quarterfinals |
| 2 | (Denmark) Team Esbjerg | 14 | 10 | 1 | 3 | 414 | 360 | +54 | 21 | Quarterfinals |
| 3 | (Denmark) Odense Håndbold | 14 | 10 | 0 | 4 | 434 | 376 | +58 | 20 | Playoffs |
| 4 | (France) Brest Bretagne Handball | 14 | 7 | 1 | 6 | 414 | 383 | +31 | 15 | Playoffs |
| 5 | (Germany) HB Ludwigsburg | 14 | 6 | 1 | 7 | 391 | 411 | −20 | 13 | Playoffs |
| 6 | (Romania) CS Rapid București | 14 | 2 | 2 | 10 | 350 | 412 | −62 | 6 | Playoffs |
| 7 | (Montenegro) WHC Budućnost BEMAX | 14 | 1 | 3 | 10 | 324 | 398 | −74 | 5 | |
| 8 | (Norway) ~~Vipers Kristiansand~~ (Note: Vipers Kristiansand declared bankruptcy on 13 January 2025 with the results that every game scheduled after that date was counted as a 10–0 win for the opponent.) | 14 | 3 | 1 | 10 | 245 | 296 | −51 | 7 | |

Source: EHF
Rules for classification: Tiebreakers
Notes:

| 7 September 2024; 18:00 | Győri Audi ETO KC (Hungary) | 28–26 | (Denmark) Team Esbjerg | Audi Aréna, Győr; Attendance: 4,492; Referees: Covalciuc, Covalciuc (MDA) |
| 7 September 2024; 18:00 | Housheer 11 | (16–12) | Reistad 15 | Audi Aréna, Győr; Attendance: 4,492; Referees: Covalciuc, Covalciuc (MDA) |
| 7 September 2024; 18:00 | 3× (suspension) | Report | 3× (suspension) | Audi Aréna, Győr; Attendance: 4,492; Referees: Covalciuc, Covalciuc (MDA) |

| 7 September 2024; 18:00 | Brest Bretagne Handball (France) | 30–27 | (Norway) Vipers Kristiansand | Brest Arena, Brest; Attendance: 3,173; Referees: Backović, Palacković (SLO) |
| 7 September 2024; 18:00 | Mairot 5 | (13–10) | Abbingh 7 | Brest Arena, Brest; Attendance: 3,173; Referees: Backović, Palacković (SLO) |
| 7 September 2024; 18:00 | 1× (yellow card) 5× (suspension) | Report | 4× (suspension) | Brest Arena, Brest; Attendance: 3,173; Referees: Backović, Palacković (SLO) |

| 8 September 2024; 16:00 | Odense Håndbold (Denmark) | 28–22 | (Germany) HB Ludwigsburg | Sydbank Arena, Odense; Attendance: 1,905; Referees: Altmár, Horváth (HUN) |
| 8 September 2024; 16:00 | Højlund 5 | (13–10) | Behrend 6 | Sydbank Arena, Odense; Attendance: 1,905; Referees: Altmár, Horváth (HUN) |
| 8 September 2024; 16:00 | 1× (yellow card) 2× (suspension) | Report | 2× (suspension) | Sydbank Arena, Odense; Attendance: 1,905; Referees: Altmár, Horváth (HUN) |

| 8 September 2024; 16:00 | CS Rapid București (Romania) | 32–27 | (Montenegro) WHC Budućnost BEMAX | Sala Polivalentă, Bucharest; Attendance: 4,150; Referees: Doychinov, Goretsov (BUL) |
| 8 September 2024; 16:00 | Janjušević 8 | (15–15) | Pavićević 7 | Sala Polivalentă, Bucharest; Attendance: 4,150; Referees: Doychinov, Goretsov (BUL) |
| 8 September 2024; 16:00 | 1× (suspension) | Report | 1× (yellow card) 2× (suspension) | Sala Polivalentă, Bucharest; Attendance: 4,150; Referees: Doychinov, Goretsov (BUL) |

| 14 September 2024; 16:00 | Vipers Kristiansand (Norway) | 30–30 | (Romania) CS Rapid București | Aquarama Kristiansand, Kristiansand; Attendance: 1,102; Referees: Budzák, Záhradník (SVK) |
| 14 September 2024; 16:00 | Abbingh 7 | (16–16) | Kassoma 6 | Aquarama Kristiansand, Kristiansand; Attendance: 1,102; Referees: Budzák, Záhradník (SVK) |
| 14 September 2024; 16:00 | 2× (suspension) | Report | 5× (suspension) | Aquarama Kristiansand, Kristiansand; Attendance: 1,102; Referees: Budzák, Záhradník (SVK) |

| 15 September 2024; 14:00 | WHC Budućnost BEMAX (Montenegro) | 22–35 | (France) Brest Bretagne Handball | Morača Sports Center, Podgorica; Attendance: 1,500; Referees: Weijmans, Wolbertus (NED) |
| 15 September 2024; 14:00 | Vukčević 8 | (10–16) | Vyakhireva 5 | Morača Sports Center, Podgorica; Attendance: 1,500; Referees: Weijmans, Wolbertus (NED) |
| 15 September 2024; 14:00 | 1× (yellow card) 7× (suspension) | Report | 1× (yellow card) 4× (suspension) | Morača Sports Center, Podgorica; Attendance: 1,500; Referees: Weijmans, Wolbertus (NED) |

| 15 September 2024; 14:00 | HB Ludwigsburg (Germany) | 26–31 | (Hungary) Győri Audi ETO KC | Arena Ludwigsburg, Ludwigsburg; Attendance: 2,471; Referees: Praštalo, Balvan (BIH) |
| 15 September 2024; 14:00 | Leuchter 6 | (16–18) | three players 5 | Arena Ludwigsburg, Ludwigsburg; Attendance: 2,471; Referees: Praštalo, Balvan (BIH) |
| 15 September 2024; 14:00 | 2× (yellow card) 2× (suspension) | Report | 5× (suspension) | Arena Ludwigsburg, Ludwigsburg; Attendance: 2,471; Referees: Praštalo, Balvan (BIH) |

| 15 September 2024; 16:00 | Team Esbjerg (Denmark) | 39–30 | (Denmark) Odense Håndbold | Blue Water Dokken, Esbjerg; Attendance: 2,380; Referees: Braseth, Sundet (NOR) |
| 15 September 2024; 16:00 | Reistad 10 | (22–14) | Aune 5 | Blue Water Dokken, Esbjerg; Attendance: 2,380; Referees: Braseth, Sundet (NOR) |
| 15 September 2024; 16:00 | 4× (suspension) | Report | 1× (yellow card) 4× (suspension) | Blue Water Dokken, Esbjerg; Attendance: 2,380; Referees: Braseth, Sundet (NOR) |

| 21 September 2024; 16:00 | Odense Håndbold (Denmark) | 31–29 | (Montenegro) WHC Budućnost BEMAX | Sydbank Arena, Odense; Attendance: 1,870; Referees: Lidacka, Lesiak (POL) |
| 21 September 2024; 16:00 | Deila 9 | (13–12) | Vukčević 9 | Sydbank Arena, Odense; Attendance: 1,870; Referees: Lidacka, Lesiak (POL) |
| 21 September 2024; 16:00 | 1× (suspension) | Report | 1× (yellow card) 4× (suspension) | Sydbank Arena, Odense; Attendance: 1,870; Referees: Lidacka, Lesiak (POL) |

| 21 September 2024; 18:00 | Győri Audi ETO KC (Hungary) | 27–22 | (Norway) Vipers Kristiansand | Audi Aréna, Győr; Attendance: 4,693; Referees: Barysas, Petrusis (LTU) |
| 21 September 2024; 18:00 | Hovden 6 | (14–9) | Strömberg 5 | Audi Aréna, Győr; Attendance: 4,693; Referees: Barysas, Petrusis (LTU) |
| 21 September 2024; 18:00 | 3× (suspension) | Report | 4× (suspension) | Audi Aréna, Győr; Attendance: 4,693; Referees: Barysas, Petrusis (LTU) |

| 21 September 2024; 18:00 | Brest Bretagne Handball (France) | 33–32 | (Denmark) Team Esbjerg | Brest Arena, Brest; Attendance: 3,362; Referees: Álvarez, Bustamante (ESP) |
| 21 September 2024; 18:00 | Faure 6 | (16–19) | Møller 8 | Brest Arena, Brest; Attendance: 3,362; Referees: Álvarez, Bustamante (ESP) |
| 21 September 2024; 18:00 | 1× (yellow card) 4× (suspension) | Report | 3× (suspension) | Brest Arena, Brest; Attendance: 3,362; Referees: Álvarez, Bustamante (ESP) |

| 22 September 2024; 16:00 | CS Rapid București (Romania) | 29–37 | (Germany) HB Ludwigsburg | Sala Polivalentă, Bucharest; Attendance: 3,500; Referees: Braseth, Sundet (NOR) |
| 22 September 2024; 16:00 | Janjušević 8 | (11–19) | Faluvégi 8 | Sala Polivalentă, Bucharest; Attendance: 3,500; Referees: Braseth, Sundet (NOR) |
| 22 September 2024; 16:00 | 5× (suspension) 1× (red card) | Report | 3× (suspension) 1× (red card) | Sala Polivalentă, Bucharest; Attendance: 3,500; Referees: Braseth, Sundet (NOR) |

| 5 October 2024; 16:00 | Vipers Kristiansand (Norway) | 26–24 | (Denmark) Odense Håndbold | Aquarama Kristiansand, Kristiansand; Attendance: 1,551; Referees: Lovin, Stancu (ROU) |
| 5 October 2024; 16:00 | four players 5 | (12–11) | Højlund 7 | Aquarama Kristiansand, Kristiansand; Attendance: 1,551; Referees: Lovin, Stancu (ROU) |
| 5 October 2024; 16:00 | 3× (suspension) | Report | 2× (yellow card) 1× (suspension) 1× (red card) | Aquarama Kristiansand, Kristiansand; Attendance: 1,551; Referees: Lovin, Stancu (ROU) |

| 6 October 2024; 14:00 | Team Esbjerg (Denmark) | 39–32 | (Romania) CS Rapid București | Blue Water Dokken, Esbjerg; Attendance: 2,378; Referees: Carmaux, Mursch (FRA) |
| 6 October 2024; 14:00 | Reistad 9 | (18–15) | Janjušević 9 | Blue Water Dokken, Esbjerg; Attendance: 2,378; Referees: Carmaux, Mursch (FRA) |
| 6 October 2024; 14:00 | 4× (suspension) | Report | 2× (yellow card) 2× (suspension) | Blue Water Dokken, Esbjerg; Attendance: 2,378; Referees: Carmaux, Mursch (FRA) |

| 6 October 2024; 14:00 | HB Ludwigsburg (Germany) | 26–33 | (France) Brest Bretagne Handball | Arena Ludwigsburg, Ludwigsburg; Attendance: 1,618; Referees: Merisi, Pepe (ITA) |
| 6 October 2024; 14:00 | Nestaker 7 | (12–14) | Mairot 8 | Arena Ludwigsburg, Ludwigsburg; Attendance: 1,618; Referees: Merisi, Pepe (ITA) |
| 6 October 2024; 14:00 | 3× (suspension) | Report | 1× (yellow card) 4× (suspension) | Arena Ludwigsburg, Ludwigsburg; Attendance: 1,618; Referees: Merisi, Pepe (ITA) |

| 6 October 2024; 16:00 | WHC Budućnost BEMAX (Montenegro) | 23–23 | (Hungary) Győri Audi ETO KC | Morača Sports Center, Podgorica; Attendance: 1,560; Referees: Vranes, Wenninger (AUT) |
| 6 October 2024; 16:00 | Despotović 7 | (10–11) | Housheer 5 | Morača Sports Center, Podgorica; Attendance: 1,560; Referees: Vranes, Wenninger (AUT) |
| 6 October 2024; 16:00 | 2× (suspension) | Report | 1× (suspension) | Morača Sports Center, Podgorica; Attendance: 1,560; Referees: Vranes, Wenninger (AUT) |

| 13 October 2024; 14:00 | Team Esbjerg (Denmark) | 30–29 | (Norway) Vipers Kristiansand | Blue Water Dokken, Esbjerg; Attendance: 2,306; Referees: Ilieva, Karbeska (MKD) |
| 13 October 2024; 14:00 | Reistad 12 | (15–13) | Roberts 7 | Blue Water Dokken, Esbjerg; Attendance: 2,306; Referees: Ilieva, Karbeska (MKD) |
| 13 October 2024; 14:00 | 3× (suspension) | Report | 1× (yellow card) 3× (suspension) | Blue Water Dokken, Esbjerg; Attendance: 2,306; Referees: Ilieva, Karbeska (MKD) |

| 13 October 2024; 14:00 | WHC Budućnost BEMAX (Montenegro) | 25–36 | (Germany) HB Ludwigsburg | Morača Sports Center, Podgorica; Attendance: 1,000; Referees: Backović, Palacković (SLO) |
| 13 October 2024; 14:00 | Vukčević 8 | (14–17) | Thomaier 7 | Morača Sports Center, Podgorica; Attendance: 1,000; Referees: Backović, Palacković (SLO) |
| 13 October 2024; 14:00 | 4× (suspension) | Report | 1× (yellow card) 2× (suspension) | Morača Sports Center, Podgorica; Attendance: 1,000; Referees: Backović, Palacković (SLO) |

| 13 October 2024; 16:00 | Brest Bretagne Handball (France) | 34–35 | (Hungary) Győri Audi ETO KC | Brest Arena, Brest; Attendance: 4,327; Referees: Hansen, Jensen (DEN) |
| 13 October 2024; 16:00 | Mairot 12 | (17–20) | Nze Minko 9 | Brest Arena, Brest; Attendance: 4,327; Referees: Hansen, Jensen (DEN) |
| 13 October 2024; 16:00 | 3× (suspension) | Report | 1× (yellow card) 3× (suspension) | Brest Arena, Brest; Attendance: 4,327; Referees: Hansen, Jensen (DEN) |

| 13 October 2024; 16:00 | Odense Håndbold (Denmark) | 32–24 | (Romania) CS Rapid București | Sydbank Arena, Odense; Attendance: 2,246; Referees: Weijmans, Wolbertus (NED) |
| 13 October 2024; 16:00 | Aagot 9 | (14–12) | Janjušević 7 | Sydbank Arena, Odense; Attendance: 2,246; Referees: Weijmans, Wolbertus (NED) |
| 13 October 2024; 16:00 | 1× (yellow card) 3× (suspension) | Report | 6× (suspension) | Sydbank Arena, Odense; Attendance: 2,246; Referees: Weijmans, Wolbertus (NED) |

| 19 October 2024; 16:00 | CS Rapid București (Romania) | 31–34 | (France) Brest Bretagne Handball | Sala Polivalentă, Bucharest; Attendance: 1,500; Referees: Praštalo, Balvan (BIH) |
| 19 October 2024; 16:00 | three players 6 | (14–14) | Vyakhireva 11 | Sala Polivalentă, Bucharest; Attendance: 1,500; Referees: Praštalo, Balvan (BIH) |
| 19 October 2024; 16:00 | 1× (yellow card) 5× (suspension) | Report | 1× (yellow card) 4× (suspension) | Sala Polivalentă, Bucharest; Attendance: 1,500; Referees: Praštalo, Balvan (BIH) |

| 19 October 2024; 18:00 | Vipers Kristiansand (Norway) | 32–23 | (Montenegro) WHC Budućnost BEMAX | Aquarama Kristiansand, Kristiansand; Attendance: 1,801; Referees: Duplii, Pobedrina (UKR) |
| 19 October 2024; 18:00 | Abbingh, Freriks 5 | (15–14) | four players 4 | Aquarama Kristiansand, Kristiansand; Attendance: 1,801; Referees: Duplii, Pobedrina (UKR) |
| 19 October 2024; 18:00 | 3× (suspension) | Report | 1× (yellow card) 7× (suspension) | Aquarama Kristiansand, Kristiansand; Attendance: 1,801; Referees: Duplii, Pobedrina (UKR) |

| 19 October 2024; 18:00 | Győri Audi ETO KC (Hungary) | 28–35 | (Denmark) Odense Håndbold | Audi Aréna, Győr; Attendance: 4,529; Referees: Antić, Jakovljević (SRB) |
| 19 October 2024; 18:00 | Housheer 9 | (16–18) | Elver 7 | Audi Aréna, Győr; Attendance: 4,529; Referees: Antić, Jakovljević (SRB) |
| 19 October 2024; 18:00 | 1× (yellow card) 2× (suspension) | Report | 1× (yellow card) 5× (suspension) | Audi Aréna, Győr; Attendance: 4,529; Referees: Antić, Jakovljević (SRB) |

| 20 October 2024; 16:00 | HB Ludwigsburg (Germany) | 31–36 | (Denmark) Team Esbjerg | Arena Ludwigsburg, Ludwigsburg; Attendance: 1,267; Referees: Xhema, Jahja (KOS) |
| 20 October 2024; 16:00 | Thomaier 6 | (16–18) | Reistad 11 | Arena Ludwigsburg, Ludwigsburg; Attendance: 1,267; Referees: Xhema, Jahja (KOS) |
| 20 October 2024; 16:00 | 1× (suspension) | Report | 1× (yellow card) 3× (suspension) | Arena Ludwigsburg, Ludwigsburg; Attendance: 1,267; Referees: Xhema, Jahja (KOS) |

| 9 November 2024; 18:00 | WHC Budućnost BEMAX (Montenegro) | 23–27 | (Denmark) Team Esbjerg | Morača Sports Center, Podgorica; Attendance: 500; Referees: Altmár, Horváth (HUN) |
| 9 November 2024; 18:00 | Vukčević 7 | (9–16) | Reistad 9 | Morača Sports Center, Podgorica; Attendance: 500; Referees: Altmár, Horváth (HUN) |
| 9 November 2024; 18:00 | 1× (yellow card) 4× (suspension) | Report | 1× (yellow card) 1× (suspension) | Morača Sports Center, Podgorica; Attendance: 500; Referees: Altmár, Horváth (HUN) |

| 9 November 2024; 18:00 | Győri Audi ETO KC (Hungary) | 31–20 | (Romania) CS Rapid București | Audi Aréna, Győr; Attendance: 4,681; Referees: Duplii, Pobedrina (UKR) |
| 9 November 2024; 18:00 | Housheer 6 | (16–11) | Kassoma 5 | Audi Aréna, Győr; Attendance: 4,681; Referees: Duplii, Pobedrina (UKR) |
| 9 November 2024; 18:00 | 4× (suspension) | Report | 3× (suspension) | Audi Aréna, Győr; Attendance: 4,681; Referees: Duplii, Pobedrina (UKR) |

| 10 November 2024; 14:00 | Vipers Kristiansand (Norway) | 30–23 | (Germany) HB Ludwigsburg | Aquarama Kristiansand, Kristiansand; Attendance: 1,508; Referees: Hansen, Jensen (DEN) |
| 10 November 2024; 14:00 | Høve 10 | (16–11) | Leuchter 5 | Aquarama Kristiansand, Kristiansand; Attendance: 1,508; Referees: Hansen, Jensen (DEN) |
| 10 November 2024; 14:00 | 3× (yellow card) 3× (suspension) | Report | 1× (suspension) | Aquarama Kristiansand, Kristiansand; Attendance: 1,508; Referees: Hansen, Jensen (DEN) |

| 10 November 2024; 16:00 | Odense Håndbold (Denmark) | 36–33 | (France) Brest Bretagne Handball | Sydbank Arena, Odense; Attendance: 2,213; Referees: Brkic, Jusufhodzic (AUT) |
| 10 November 2024; 16:00 | Aagot 11 | (21–18) | Mairot 9 | Sydbank Arena, Odense; Attendance: 2,213; Referees: Brkic, Jusufhodzic (AUT) |
| 10 November 2024; 16:00 | 2× (yellow card) 5× (suspension) | Report | 3× (suspension) | Sydbank Arena, Odense; Attendance: 2,213; Referees: Brkic, Jusufhodzic (AUT) |

| 16 November 2024; 16:00 | HB Ludwigsburg (Germany) | 33–29 | (Norway) Vipers Kristiansand | Arena Ludwigsburg, Ludwigsburg; Attendance: 1,859; Referees: Weijmans, Wolbertus (NED) |
| 16 November 2024; 16:00 | Leuchter 6 | (18–15) | Høve 6 | Arena Ludwigsburg, Ludwigsburg; Attendance: 1,859; Referees: Weijmans, Wolbertus (NED) |
| 16 November 2024; 16:00 | 3× (suspension) | Report | 1× (yellow card) 2× (suspension) | Arena Ludwigsburg, Ludwigsburg; Attendance: 1,859; Referees: Weijmans, Wolbertus (NED) |

| 17 November 2024; 14:00 | Team Esbjerg (Denmark) | 26–19 | (Montenegro) WHC Budućnost BEMAX | Blue Water Dokken, Esbjerg; Attendance: 2,380; Referees: Merisi, Pepe (ITA) |
| 17 November 2024; 14:00 | Solberg-Isaksen 6 | (10–9) | Radivojević 5 | Blue Water Dokken, Esbjerg; Attendance: 2,380; Referees: Merisi, Pepe (ITA) |
| 17 November 2024; 14:00 | 1× (yellow card) 3× (suspension) | Report | 1× (yellow card) 4× (suspension) | Blue Water Dokken, Esbjerg; Attendance: 2,380; Referees: Merisi, Pepe (ITA) |

| 17 November 2024; 16:00 | Brest Bretagne Handball (France) | 36–38 | (Denmark) Odense Håndbold | Brest Arena, Brest; Attendance: 4,260; Referees: Barysas, Petrusis (LTU) |
| 17 November 2024; 16:00 | Novak 6 | (17–18) | three players 6 | Brest Arena, Brest; Attendance: 4,260; Referees: Barysas, Petrusis (LTU) |
| 17 November 2024; 16:00 | 1× (yellow card) 3× (suspension) | Report | 1× (yellow card) 4× (suspension) 1× (red card) | Brest Arena, Brest; Attendance: 4,260; Referees: Barysas, Petrusis (LTU) |

| 17 November 2024; 16:00 | CS Rapid București (Romania) | 25–28 | (Hungary) Győri Audi ETO KC | Sala Polivalentă, Bucharest; Attendance: 2,650; Referees: Xhema, Jahja (KOS) |
| 17 November 2024; 16:00 | Grozav 7 | (11–15) | Nze Minko 8 | Sala Polivalentă, Bucharest; Attendance: 2,650; Referees: Xhema, Jahja (KOS) |
| 17 November 2024; 16:00 | 1× (suspension) | Report | 2× (yellow card) 1× (suspension) | Sala Polivalentă, Bucharest; Attendance: 2,650; Referees: Xhema, Jahja (KOS) |

| 11 January 2025; 18:00 | WHC Budućnost BEMAX (Montenegro) | 26–20 | (Norway) Vipers Kristiansand | Morača Sports Center, Podgorica; Attendance: 500; Referees: Lončar, Lončar (CRO) |
| 11 January 2025; 18:00 | Vukčević 7 | (13–9) | Abbingh 8 | Morača Sports Center, Podgorica; Attendance: 500; Referees: Lončar, Lončar (CRO) |
| 11 January 2025; 18:00 | 5× (suspension) | Report | 4× (suspension) | Morača Sports Center, Podgorica; Attendance: 500; Referees: Lončar, Lončar (CRO) |

| 11 January 2025; 18:00 | Brest Bretagne Handball (France) | 33–21 | (Romania) CS Rapid București | Brest Arena, Brest; Attendance: 4,024; Referees: Altmár, Horváth (HUN) |
| 11 January 2025; 18:00 | Coatanea 8 | (15–9) | Grozav 5 | Brest Arena, Brest; Attendance: 4,024; Referees: Altmár, Horváth (HUN) |
| 11 January 2025; 18:00 | | Report | 1× (yellow card) 4× (suspension) | Brest Arena, Brest; Attendance: 4,024; Referees: Altmár, Horváth (HUN) |

| 12 January 2025; 14:00 | Team Esbjerg (Denmark) | 30–30 | (Germany) HB Ludwigsburg | Blue Water Dokken, Esbjerg; Attendance: 2,347; Referees: Duplii, Pobedrina (UKR) |
| 12 January 2025; 14:00 | Reistad 11 | (12–20) | Thomaier 5 | Blue Water Dokken, Esbjerg; Attendance: 2,347; Referees: Duplii, Pobedrina (UKR) |
| 12 January 2025; 14:00 | 4× (suspension) | Report | 6× (suspension) | Blue Water Dokken, Esbjerg; Attendance: 2,347; Referees: Duplii, Pobedrina (UKR) |

| 12 January 2025; 16:00 | Odense Håndbold (Denmark) | 32–34 | (Hungary) Győri Audi ETO KC | Sydbank Arena, Odense; Referees: Merisi, Pepe (ITA) |
| 12 January 2025; 16:00 | Aagot 12 | (15–18) | Housheer 8 | Sydbank Arena, Odense; Referees: Merisi, Pepe (ITA) |
| 12 January 2025; 16:00 | 1× (yellow card) 3× (suspension) | Report | 1× (yellow card) 2× (suspension) 1× (red card) | Sydbank Arena, Odense; Referees: Merisi, Pepe (ITA) |

| 18 January 2025; 18:00 | Győri Audi ETO KC (Hungary) | 28–27 | (France) Brest Bretagne Handball | Audi Aréna, Győr; Attendance: 4,889; Referees: Vujačić, Kažanegra (MNE) |
| 18 January 2025; 18:00 | Fodor 6 | (14–13) | Lassource, Vyakhireva 7 | Audi Aréna, Győr; Attendance: 4,889; Referees: Vujačić, Kažanegra (MNE) |
| 18 January 2025; 18:00 | 4× (suspension) | Report | 3× (suspension) | Audi Aréna, Győr; Attendance: 4,889; Referees: Vujačić, Kažanegra (MNE) |

| 19 January 2025; 14:00 | HB Ludwigsburg (Germany) | 26–18 | (Montenegro) WHC Budućnost BEMAX | Arena Ludwigsburg, Ludwigsburg; Attendance: 1,378; Referees: Andorka, Hucker (HUN) |
| 19 January 2025; 14:00 | Döll 6 | (13–10) | Vukčević 5 | Arena Ludwigsburg, Ludwigsburg; Attendance: 1,378; Referees: Andorka, Hucker (HUN) |
| 19 January 2025; 14:00 | 1× (yellow card) 1× (suspension) | Report | 1× (yellow card) 3× (suspension) | Arena Ludwigsburg, Ludwigsburg; Attendance: 1,378; Referees: Andorka, Hucker (HUN) |

| 19 January 2025; 16:00 | CS Rapid București (Romania) | 25–42 | (Denmark) Odense Håndbold | Sala Polivalentă, Bucharest; Attendance: 1,700; Referees: Cipov, Klus (SVK) |
| 19 January 2025; 16:00 | Kassoma 5 | (15–20) | Halilcevic, Højlund 6 | Sala Polivalentă, Bucharest; Attendance: 1,700; Referees: Cipov, Klus (SVK) |
| 19 January 2025; 16:00 | 1× (yellow card) 4× (suspension) | Report | 3× (suspension) | Sala Polivalentă, Bucharest; Attendance: 1,700; Referees: Cipov, Klus (SVK) |

| 25 January 2025; 18:00 | Győri Audi ETO KC (Hungary) | 33–21 | (Montenegro) WHC Budućnost BEMAX | Audi Aréna, Győr; Attendance: 4,277; Referees: Hatipoğlu, Şimşek (TUR) |
| 25 January 2025; 18:00 | De Paula 7 | (18–12) | Ivanović, Vukčević 4 | Audi Aréna, Győr; Attendance: 4,277; Referees: Hatipoğlu, Şimşek (TUR) |
| 25 January 2025; 18:00 | 1× (yellow card) 1× (suspension) | Report | 1× (yellow card) 2× (suspension) | Audi Aréna, Győr; Attendance: 4,277; Referees: Hatipoğlu, Şimşek (TUR) |

| 25 January 2025; 18:00 | Brest Bretagne Handball (France) | 26–28 | (Germany) HB Ludwigsburg | Brest Arena, Brest; Attendance: 4,228; Referees: Antić, Jakovljević (SRB) |
| 25 January 2025; 18:00 | Faure 5 | (13–15) | Nestaker 8 | Brest Arena, Brest; Attendance: 4,228; Referees: Antić, Jakovljević (SRB) |
| 25 January 2025; 18:00 | 3× (suspension) | Report | 5× (suspension) | Brest Arena, Brest; Attendance: 4,228; Referees: Antić, Jakovljević (SRB) |

| 26 January 2025; 16:00 | CS Rapid București (Romania) | 26–28 | (Denmark) Team Esbjerg | Sala Polivalentă, Bucharest; Attendance: 2,000; Referees: Jović, Arnautović (BIH) |
| 26 January 2025; 16:00 | Kouyaté 5 | (11–12) | Reistad 8 | Sala Polivalentă, Bucharest; Attendance: 2,000; Referees: Jović, Arnautović (BIH) |
| 26 January 2025; 16:00 | 3× (suspension) | Report | 1× (yellow card) 3× (suspension) | Sala Polivalentă, Bucharest; Attendance: 2,000; Referees: Jović, Arnautović (BIH) |

| 8 February 2025; 16:00 | WHC Budućnost BEMAX (Montenegro) | 24–33 | (Denmark) Odense Håndbold | Morača Sports Center, Podgorica; Attendance: 500; Referees: Xhema, Jahja (KOS) |
| 8 February 2025; 16:00 | Radivojević 10 | (13–18) | Aardahl 6 | Morača Sports Center, Podgorica; Attendance: 500; Referees: Xhema, Jahja (KOS) |
| 8 February 2025; 16:00 | 1× (yellow card) 4× (suspension) | Report | 1× (yellow card) 4× (suspension) | Morača Sports Center, Podgorica; Attendance: 500; Referees: Xhema, Jahja (KOS) |

| 9 February 2025; 14:00 | HB Ludwigsburg (Germany) | 30–24 | (Romania) CS Rapid București | Arena Ludwigsburg, Ludwigsburg; Attendance: 1,562; Referees: Lidacka, Lesiak (POL) |
| 9 February 2025; 14:00 | Smits 7 | (17–14) | Kassoma 6 | Arena Ludwigsburg, Ludwigsburg; Attendance: 1,562; Referees: Lidacka, Lesiak (POL) |
| 9 February 2025; 14:00 | 3× (suspension) | Report | 7× (suspension) | Arena Ludwigsburg, Ludwigsburg; Attendance: 1,562; Referees: Lidacka, Lesiak (POL) |

| 9 February 2025; 16:00 | Team Esbjerg (Denmark) | 36–27 | (France) Brest Bretagne Handball | Blue Water Dokken, Esbjerg; Attendance: 2,481; Referees: Metalari, Nikolovski (MKD) |
| 9 February 2025; 16:00 | Reistad 10 | (20–15) | Ondono 9 | Blue Water Dokken, Esbjerg; Attendance: 2,481; Referees: Metalari, Nikolovski (MKD) |
| 9 February 2025; 16:00 | 1× (yellow card) 4× (suspension) | Report | 3× (suspension) | Blue Water Dokken, Esbjerg; Attendance: 2,481; Referees: Metalari, Nikolovski (MKD) |

| 15 February 2025; 18:00 | Brest Bretagne Handball (France) | 23–23 | (Montenegro) WHC Budućnost BEMAX | Brest Arena, Brest; Attendance: 4,211; Referees: Bočáková, Jánošíková (SVK) |
| 15 February 2025; 18:00 | Mairot 6 | (13–10) | Vukčević 9 | Brest Arena, Brest; Attendance: 4,211; Referees: Bočáková, Jánošíková (SVK) |
| 15 February 2025; 18:00 | 6× (suspension) | Report | 6× (suspension) | Brest Arena, Brest; Attendance: 4,211; Referees: Bočáková, Jánošíková (SVK) |

| 16 February 2025; 16:00 | Győri Audi ETO KC (Hungary) | 32–19 | (Germany) HB Ludwigsburg | Audi Aréna, Győr; Attendance: 4,751; Referees: Doychinov, Goretsov (BUL) |
| 16 February 2025; 16:00 | Győri-Lukács 6 | (17–8) | Thomaier 5 | Audi Aréna, Győr; Attendance: 4,751; Referees: Doychinov, Goretsov (BUL) |
| 16 February 2025; 16:00 | 1× (yellow card) 4× (suspension) | Report | 1× (suspension) | Audi Aréna, Győr; Attendance: 4,751; Referees: Doychinov, Goretsov (BUL) |

| 16 February 2025; 16:00 | Odense Håndbold (Denmark) | 20–31 | (Denmark) Team Esbjerg | Sydbank Arena, Odense; Attendance: 2,293; Referees: Kull, Tint (EST) |
| 16 February 2025; 16:00 | Aardahl 5 | (11–16) | Reistad 13 | Sydbank Arena, Odense; Attendance: 2,293; Referees: Kull, Tint (EST) |
| 16 February 2025; 16:00 | 3× (suspension) | Report | 1× (yellow card) 2× (suspension) | Sydbank Arena, Odense; Attendance: 2,293; Referees: Kull, Tint (EST) |

| 23 February 2025; 14:00 | HB Ludwigsburg (Germany) | 24–40 | (Denmark) Odense Håndbold | Arena Ludwigsburg, Ludwigsburg; Attendance: 1,250; Referees: Ilieva, Karbeska (MKD) |
| 23 February 2025; 14:00 | Thomaier 5 | (11–17) | Halilcevic, Valle Dahl 10 | Arena Ludwigsburg, Ludwigsburg; Attendance: 1,250; Referees: Ilieva, Karbeska (MKD) |
| 23 February 2025; 14:00 | 1× (yellow card) | Report | 1× (yellow card) 3× (suspension) | Arena Ludwigsburg, Ludwigsburg; Attendance: 1,250; Referees: Ilieva, Karbeska (MKD) |

| 23 February 2025; 16:00 | Team Esbjerg (Denmark) | 23–29 | (Hungary) Győri Audi ETO KC | Blue Water Dokken, Esbjerg; Attendance: 2,634; Referees: Lovin, Stancu (ROU) |
| 23 February 2025; 16:00 | three players 4 | (12–15) | De Paula 8 | Blue Water Dokken, Esbjerg; Attendance: 2,634; Referees: Lovin, Stancu (ROU) |
| 23 February 2025; 16:00 | 1× (suspension) | Report | 1× (yellow card) 4× (suspension) | Blue Water Dokken, Esbjerg; Attendance: 2,634; Referees: Lovin, Stancu (ROU) |

| 23 February 2025; 16:00 | WHC Budućnost BEMAX (Montenegro) | 21–21 | (Romania) CS Rapid București | Morača Sports Center, Podgorica; Attendance: 1,530; Referees: Barysas, Petrusis (LTU) |
| 23 February 2025; 16:00 | Vukčević 7 | (12–9) | Polman 6 | Morača Sports Center, Podgorica; Attendance: 1,530; Referees: Barysas, Petrusis (LTU) |
| 23 February 2025; 16:00 | 1× (yellow card) 2× (suspension) | Report | 1× (yellow card) 2× (suspension) | Morača Sports Center, Podgorica; Attendance: 1,530; Referees: Barysas, Petrusis (LTU) |

| Vipers Kristiansand (Norway) | 0–10 (Note: The matches were counted as a 10–0 win as Vipers Kristiansand declared bankruptcy.) | (Denmark) Team Esbjerg |

| Odense Håndbold (Denmark) | 10–0 | (Norway) Vipers Kristiansand |

| Vipers Kristiansand (Norway) | 0–10 | (Hungary) Győri Audi ETO KC |

| CS Rapid București (Romania) | 10–0 | (Norway) Vipers Kristiansand |

| Vipers Kristiansand (Norway) | 0–10 | (France) Brest Bretagne Handball |
