= Blackmon =

Blackmon is an English surname. Notable people with the surname include:

- Barbara Blackmon (born 1955), American politician
- Brenda Blackmon, American anchor
- Charlie Blackmon (born 1986), American baseball outfielder
- Clarence Blackmon (1942–2011), American basketball coach
- Cliff Blackmon (1914–1995), American baseball pitcher
- Don Blackmon (born 1958), American football coach player
- Douglas A. Blackmon (born 1964), American writer and Pulitzer Prize winner
- Edafe Blackmon (born 1971), African-American actor
- Edward Blackmon Jr. (born 1947), American attorney and politician
- Eugene Blackmon Jr. (1959–1988), American firefighter
- Fred L. Blackmon (1873–1921), American politician
- Harold Blackmon (born 1978), American football player
- Isaiah Blackmon (born 1996), American basketball player
- James Blackmon Sr. (born 1964), American basketball coach and player
- James Blackmon Jr. (born 1995), American basketball player
- Julian Blackmon (born 1998), American football defensive back
- Julie Blackmon (born 1966), American photographer
- Justin Blackmon (born 1990), American football wide receiver
- Kenneth R. Blackmon (born c. 1967), American rear admiral
- Larry Blackmon (born 1956), American musician
- Mekhi Blackmon (born 1999), American football player
- Robert Blackmon (born 1967), American football player
- Roland Blackmon (1928–2017), American hurdler
- Roosevelt Blackmon (born 1974), American football player
- Rosemary Barnsdall Blackmon (1921–1983), American writer and magazine editor
- Shaw Blackmon (born 1973), American politician
- Tiffany Blackmon (born 1984), American sports reporter
- Traci D. Blackmon, African American minister
- Tray Blackmon (born 1985), Canadian football linebacker
- Tristan Blackmon (born 1996), American soccer player
- Will Blackmon (born 1984), American football player
- William Joshua Blackmon (1921–2010), American street preacher and artist

Fictional characters:

- Mars Blackmon, character portrayed by Spike Lee in his film She's Gotta Have It and several Air Jordan commercials that he directed.

== Places ==
- Blackmon Peak, Custer County, Idaho

== See also ==
- Blackman (surname)
