= Preben Blach =

Danish hockey player (1920–2007)

Personal information
- Nationality: Danish
- Born: 15 December 1920 Frederiksberg, Denmark
- Died: 28 March 2007 (aged 86) Copenhagen, Denmark

Sport
- Sport: Field hockey

Preben Blach (15 December 1920 – 28 March 2007) was a Danish field hockey player. He competed in the men's tournament at the 1948 Summer Olympics.

Blach came from a family of hockey players. His father Arne Blach was also a hockey player and competed in the 1928 Olympics and the 1936 Olympics. His uncles Ejvind Blach and Svend Blach competed at the 1920 Olympics.
