= Pletikosić =

Pletikosić (Serbian Cyrillic: Плетикосић) is a Croatian surname with Gothic heritage. Notable people with the surname include:

- Matea Pletikosić, Croatian-Montenegrin handball player
- Stevan Pletikosić, Serbian sports shooter
