= Ejvind Blach =

Danish field hockey player (1895–1972)

Olympic medal record

Men's field hockey
Silver medal – second place	1920 Antwerp	Team competition

Ejvind Mollerup Blach (31 December 1895 – 1 October 1972) was a Danish field hockey player who competed in the 1920 Summer Olympics. He was a member of the Danish field hockey team, which won the silver medal.

At the club level, he played for Københavns Hockeyklub.

He came from a family of hockey players. His brother Svend Blach was on the same 1920 Olympics team. His brother Arne Blach was also a hockey player and competed in the 1928 Olympics. His Nephew Preben Blach competed at the 1948 Olympics.
