= 2024–25 Women's EHF Champions League =

European handball tournament

Women's EHF Champions League
- 2024–25

Tournament information
- Sport: Handball
- Dates: 7 September 2024–1 June 2025
- Teams: 16
- Website: ehfcl.com

Final positions
- Champions: (Hungary) Győri Audi ETO KC
- Runner-up: (Denmark) Odense Håndbold

Tournament statistics
- Matches played: 132
- Goals scored: 7148 (54.15 per match)
- Attendance: 394,435 (2,988 per match)
- MVP: (Norway) Kari Brattset Dale
- Top scorer(s): (Norway) Henny Reistad (154 goals)

The 2024–25 Women's EHF Champions League was the 32nd edition of Europe's premier club handball tournament, running from 7 September 2024 to 1 June 2025.

Győri Audi ETO KC were the defending champions and won the tournament for second straight and seventh overall time, after defeating Odense Håndbold in the final.

== Format ==
The tournament ran using the same format as the previous three seasons. The competition began with a group stage featuring sixteen teams divided into two groups. Matches were played in a double round-robin system with home-and-away fixtures, fourteen in total for each team. In Groups A and B, the top two teams automatically qualified for the quarter-finals, with teams ranked 3rd to 6th entered the playoff round.

The knockout stage included four rounds: the playoffs, quarter-finals, and a final-four tournament comprising two semifinals and the final. In the playoffs, eight teams were paired against each other in two-legged home-and-away matches (third-placed in group A plays sixth-placed group B; fourth-placed group A plays fifth-placed group B, etc.). The four aggregate winners of the playoffs advanced to the quarterfinals, joining the top-two teams of Groups A and B. The eight quarterfinalist teams were paired against each other in two-legged home-and-away matches, with the four aggregate winners qualifying to the final-four tournament.

In the final four tournament, the semifinals and the final were played as single matches at a pre-selected host venue.

== Rankings ==
The rankings were based on the performances from the three most recent seasons.

- Associations 1–9 had their league champion qualify for the group stage and apply up to two wildcards.
- The best-ranked association in the Women's EHF European League could have its league champion and runner-up qualified for the group stage and can apply for one wildcard.
- Associations below the top 9 had their league champion apply for a wildcard.

Rank	Association	Average points	Teams
1	Norway	240.00	2
2	Hungary	182.00	2
3	France	155.33	2
4	Russia	133.00	0
5	Denmark	128.33	3
6	Romania	113.00	3
7	Slovenia	85.00	1
8	Montenegro	71.67	1
9	Germany	61.33	1

Rank	Association	Average points	Teams
10	Croatia	53.50	1
11	Sweden	49.00	0
12	Turkey	48.00	0
13	Czech Republic	46.00	0
14	Everyone else	0.00	0

== Teams ==
19 teams applied for a place, with nine having a fixed place. The final list was announced on 21 June 2024.

The fixed place for Russia was vacant since the country and its clubs were not admitted to participate in the EHF competitions due to the Russian invasion of Ukraine.

Participating teams
(Denmark) Team Esbjerg (1st)	(Denmark) Nykøbing Falster Håndboldklub (2nd)	(France) Metz Handball (1st)	(Germany) HB Ludwigsburg (1st)
(Hungary) FTC-Rail Cargo Hungaria (1st)	(Montenegro) WHC Budućnost BEMAX (1st)	(Norway) Vipers Kristiansand (1st)	(Romania) CSM București (1st)
(Slovenia) RK Krim Mercator (1st)	(Croatia) HC Podravka Vegeta (1st) ^{WC}	(Denmark) Odense Håndbold (3rd) ^{WC}	(France) Brest Bretagne Handball (2nd) ^{WC}
(Hungary) Győri Audi ETO KC (2nd) ^{WC}	(Norway) Storhamar HE (2nd) ^{WC}	(Romania) CS Rapid București (2nd) ^{WC}	(Romania) CS Gloria Bistrița (3rd) ^{WC}

- ^{WC} Accepted wildcards

Rejected upgrades
(Germany) Borussia Dortmund (4th)	(Hungary) DVSC Schaeffler (4th)	(Norway) Sola HK (3rd)

== Draw ==
The draw was held on 27 June 2024.

== Group stage ==
Location of teams of the 2024–25 Women's EHF Champions League group stage.
Red: Group A; Blue: Group B.

The 16 teams were drawn into two groups of eight. In regards to Denmark and Romania, who had three clubs in the group stage, a maximum of two clubs from those countries could be drawn into the same group.

In the group stage, teams were ranked according to points (2 points for a win, 1 point for a draw, 0 points for a loss). After completion of the group stage, if two or more teams have scored the same number of points, the ranking was determined as follows:

1. Highest number of points in matches between the teams directly involved;
2. Superior goal difference in matches between the teams directly involved;
3. Highest number of goals scored in matches between the teams directly involved;
4. Superior goal difference in all matches of the group;
5. Highest number of plus goals in all matches of the group;
6. Drawing of Lots

This season, nine national associations were present. Poland and Sweden both miss out while Croatia return after a one-season absence. CS Gloria Bistrița made their debut in the Champions League.

=== Group A ===
Pos	Team	Pld	W	D	L	GF	GA	GD	Pts	Qualification	MET	FER	BUC	KRI	KOP	STO	BIS	NYK
1	(France) Metz Handball	14	13	1	0	413	361	+52	27	Quarterfinals	—	24–19	27–24	34–30	35–31	24–20	28–26	30–22
2	(Hungary) FTC-Rail Cargo Hungaria	14	12	0	2	395	351	+44	24	Quarterfinals	23–26	—	31–28	28–27	33–24	26–25	32–28	31–22
3	(Romania) CSM București	14	9	0	5	414	383	+31	18	Playoffs	31–32	26–28	—	36–23	31–30	32–28	32–23	27–26
4	(Slovenia) RK Krim Mercator	14	6	1	7	390	404	−14	13	Playoffs	25–34	22–27	29–31	—	30–29	25–23	28–25	35–25
5	(Croatia) HC Podravka Vegeta	14	5	1	8	383	392	−9	11	Playoffs	26–28	29–30	28–29	23–24	—	25–24	26–25	27–27
6	(Norway) Storhamar HE	14	3	2	9	351	377	−26	8	Playoffs	29–29	21–27	21–32	29–28	23–25	—	25–23	22–22
7	(Romania) CS Gloria Bistrița	14	3	0	11	378	410	−32	6		28–34	23–26	30–26	30–35	25–29	31–28	—	37–29
8	(Denmark) Nykøbing Falster Håndboldklub	14	1	3	10	372	418	−46	5		27–28	27–34	27–29	30–30	28–31	28–33	32–24	—

Source: EHF
Rules for classification: Tiebreakers

=== Group B ===
Pos	Team	Pld	W	D	L	GF	GA	GD	Pts	Qualification	GYO	ESB	ODE	BRE	LUD	BUC	BUD	~~VIP~~
1	(Hungary) Győri Audi ETO KC	14	12	1	1	397	333	+64	25	Quarterfinals	—	28–26	28–35	28–27	32–19	31–20	33–21	27–22
2	(Denmark) Team Esbjerg	14	10	1	3	414	360	+54	21	Quarterfinals	23–29	—	39–30	36–27	30–30	39–32	26–19	30–29
3	(Denmark) Odense Håndbold	14	10	0	4	434	376	+58	20	Playoffs	32–34	20–31	—	36–33	28–22	32–24	31–29	10–0
4	(France) Brest Bretagne Handball	14	7	1	6	414	383	+31	15	Playoffs	34–35	33–32	36–38	—	26–28	33–21	23–23	30–27
5	(Germany) HB Ludwigsburg	14	6	1	7	391	411	−20	13	Playoffs	26–31	31–36	24–40	26–33	—	30–24	26–18	33–29
6	(Romania) CS Rapid București	14	2	2	10	350	412	−62	6	Playoffs	25–28	26–28	25–42	31–34	29–37	—	32–27	10–0
7	(Montenegro) WHC Budućnost BEMAX	14	1	3	10	324	398	−74	5		23–23	23–27	24–33	22–35	25–36	21–21	—	26–20
8	(Norway) ~~Vipers Kristiansand~~ (Note: Vipers Kristiansand declared bankruptcy on 13 January 2025 with the results that every game scheduled after that date was counted as a 10–0 win for the opponent.)	14	3	1	10	245	296	−51	7		0–10	0–10	26–24	0–10	30–23	30–30	32–23	—

Source: EHF
Rules for classification: Tiebreakers

== Knockout stage ==
=== Playoffs ===
Team 1	Agg.	Team 2	1st leg	2nd leg
CS Rapid București (Romania)	46–62	(Romania) CSM București	24–34	22–28
Storhamar HE (Norway)	41–58	(Denmark) Odense Håndbold	20–33	21–25
HB Ludwigsburg (Germany)	54–47	(Slovenia) RK Krim Mercator	31–21	23–26
HC Podravka Vegeta (Croatia)	54–61	(France) Brest Bretagne Handball	27–26	27–35

=== Quarterfinals ===
Team 1	Agg.	Team 2	1st leg	2nd leg
Brest Bretagne Handball (France)	58–62	(France) Metz Handball	26–29	32–33
HB Ludwigsburg (Germany)	46–54	(Hungary) Győri Audi ETO KC	24–25	22–29
Odense Håndbold (Denmark)	52–51	(Hungary) FTC-Rail Cargo Hungaria	27–27	25–24
CSM București (Romania)	52–55	(Denmark) Team Esbjerg	30–29	22–26

=== Final four ===
The final four will be held at the MVM Dome in Budapest, Hungary on 31 May and 1 June 2025.

==== Bracket ====
Semi-finals
31 May
(Hungary) Győri Audi ETO KC	29
(Denmark) Team Esbjerg	28
31 May
(France) Metz Handball	29
(Denmark) Odense Håndbold (ET)	31

Final
1 June
(Hungary) Győri Audi ETO KC	29
(Denmark) Odense Håndbold	27
Third place
1 June
(Denmark) Team Esbjerg	30
(France) Metz Handball	27

==== Final ====
1 June 2025; 18:00	Győri Audi ETO KC (Hungary)	29–27	(Denmark) Odense Håndbold	MVM Dome, Budapest; Attendance: 19,469; Referees: Mata, López (ESP)
1 June 2025; 18:00	three players 6	(20–15)	Højlund 5	MVM Dome, Budapest; Attendance: 19,469; Referees: Mata, López (ESP)
1 June 2025; 18:00	1× (yellow card) 2× (suspension)	Report	2× (suspension) 1× (red card)	MVM Dome, Budapest; Attendance: 19,469; Referees: Mata, López (ESP)

== Top goalscorers ==
Rank	Player	Club	Goals
1	(Norway) Henny Reistad	(Denmark) Team Esbjerg	154
2	(Slovenia) Elizabeth Omoregie	(Romania) CSM București	109
3	(France) Sarah Bouktit	(France) Metz Handball	107
4	(Romania) Cristina Neagu	(Romania) CSM București	101
5	(Slovenia) Ana Gros	(Slovenia) RK Krim Mercator	91
5	(Netherlands) Dione Housheer	(Hungary) Győri Audi ETO KC	91
7	(Norway) Thale Rushfeldt Deila	(Denmark) Odense Håndbold	88
7	(France) Clarisse Mairot	(France) Brest Bretagne Handball	88
9	(Montenegro) Matea Pletikosić	(Croatia) HC Podravka Vegeta	86
10	(Russia) Anna Vyakhireva	(France) Brest Bretagne Handball	85

== See also ==
- 2024–25 EHF Champions League
- 2024–25 EHF European League
- 2024–25 EHF European Cup
- 2024–25 Women's EHF European League
- 2024–25 Women's EHF European Cup
