= Nordisk Film TV =

Danish television production company

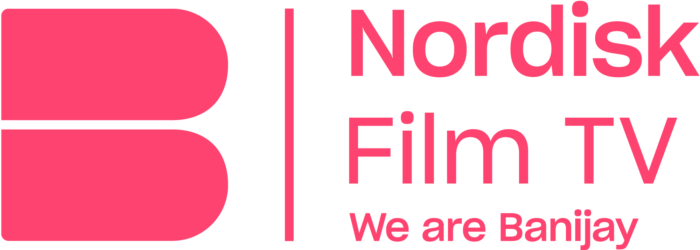
- Founded: 1984; 42 years ago
- Headquarters: Valby, Copenhagen, Denmark
- Key people: Jacob Houlind (president and CEO)
- Parent: Nordisk Film (1984–2009); Banijay Group (2009–2020); Banijay Nordics (2020–)
- Website: www.nordiskfilmtv.dk

Nordisk Film TV is a Danish television production company that is known for creating a wide range of programming including entertainment, drama, factual, reality, children's, and branded content. It was originally known as the television division of Nordisk Film before being split from Nordisk Film and was sold to Banijay Entertainment.

== History ==
In May 2007, Nordisk Film TV joined forces with stand-up comedians Omar Marzouk, Michael Pedersen and Chris D Nørgaard to create a joint venture comedy production dedicated to producing comedy television programming named Respirator with co-founder Michael Pedersen becomes Respirator's president whilst Nordisk Film TV CEO Jacob Houlind will head Nordisk Film TV's new comedy production subsidiary.

In October 2009, Nordisk Film TV alongside its distribution division Nordisk Film TV Globe and its production companies including branded entertainment studio Respirator and Finnish production studio Solar Films had been acquired by French production & distribution company Banijay Group and was split from its previous film & television production parent Nordisk Film, the acquisition gave Banijay Entertainment an expansion into the Scandinavian production industry as Jacob Houlind and Peter Hansen continued managing the acquired company.

== Filmography ==
Title	Years	Network	Notes
GO' Aften Danmark	2002–2019	TV 2	
2900 Happiness	2007–2009	TV3	
Natholdet	2010–2022	TV 2	co-production with Pineapple Entertainment
Taxaquizzen	2011–2012	TV 2	
Blachman	2013	DR2	
