= Blachman (disambiguation) =

Blachman is a 2013 Danish talk show.

Blachman may also refer to:

- Thomas Blachman, Danish jazz musician, composer and show host
- Jeremy Blachman (born 1979), American journalist
