= William Joshua Blackmon =

American artist (1921–2010)

- Born: 20 April 1921; Albion, Michigan
- Died: 8 February 2010 (aged 88); Detroit, Michigan

William Joshua Blackmon (20 April 1921 – 8 February 2010), also known as Prophet Blackmon, was an American street preacher and a well known Milwaukee artist. Jeffrey R. Hayes, professor of art history at the University of Wisconsin–Milwaukee, described him as "among the best self-taught artists ever to come out of Milwaukee".

== Life ==
Born on 20 April 1921, Blackmon grew up in Albion, Michigan. His mother, Gussie Blackmon, a devout Baptist, was originally from Macon, Georgia. His father, Dan Blackmon was from Selma, Alabama. They moved north as part of the Great Migration of African Americans out of the Southern United States to seek better jobs and to escape racism and prejudice in the South. According to Blackmon's sister, Lyla M.Washington, their parents arrived in Albion on October 13, 1912, "a young teen-age husband and wife". They eventually had twelve children, seven girls and five sons. The family lived on a small farm near Albion in a five-room house built by Dan Blackmon. Blackmon has said that when he was eight he predicted the death of a neighbour after hearing her "death rattle". Blackmon left Washington Gardner High School in Albion in 1937 in the tenth grade to look for work together with his father. He tamped stone and laid track for the New York Central Railroad and then worked for a short period at Albion Malleable Iron Works, the largest factory in Albion.

He served with the U.S. Army 585th Engineers Company from 1943 to 1945 during World War II, mostly in the Pacific Theater (New Guinea, Southern Philippines, Luzon). He received six bronze battle stars and several campaign ribbons. The war shaped his religious outlook and he turned to prayer during the heat of battle. He said "I learned to pray during the Second World War. When the Japanese planes came over, I'd say: 'Lord, if you get me over this hill, I'll get over the next one myself.'"

He moved to Chicago and opened a shoeshine stand near the Christian Hope Missionary Baptist Church. He claims to have been cured of acute chronic gastritis after the preacher said that God would heal anyone in the congregation if had faith in his divine power. Blackmon married twice, his first wife died in childbirth, and he separated from his second wife. In 1974, he moved to Milwaukee, Wisconsin, and settled there where he ran his own small laundry and tailoring businesses including the Revival Center Shoe Repair and Shine Parlor in the Sydney Hih building.

== Works ==
Sometimes you can paint a picture to a person. It does not have to be with a brush, maybe just by talking. If you can tell it, so that the person can see it, they actually see it in their mind. It'll be like a little painting in their mind. That's what this art is for, getting a message to people.

— Prophet William Blackmon

=== Materials and themes ===
Blackmon created large handwritten signs which he displayed to warn society of the consequences of sinning. Using house paint, he increasingly embellished his signs with imagery including biblical scenes and symbols of deliverance and retribution, along with visual commentary on social marginalization. Over time his signs became more focused on imagery than words, with words still being an integral part but usually confined to a border.

External images
- Prophet Blackmon pictured alongside some of his work at an art festival. (photo by Bill Tennessen)
- Elijah Told Ahab Painted wood 20 ½ x 22 ½ inches
- Untitled (King Uzziah Goes Into the Temple), mid 1990s, Painted wood 26 x 26 ½ inches

=== Exhibitions and collections ===
In 1999, the Patrick and Beatrice Haggerty Museum of Art, Marquette University, organized the solo exhibition Signs of Inspiration : The Art of Prophet William J. Blackmon, the artist's first museum retrospective. The exhibition was curated Jeffrey R. Hayes and included representative works from all periods of his career with all of the works coming from Paul and Jeanne Phelps' collection of Blackmon's paintings. Blackmon worked with the organizers and catalogue authors. The exhibition traveled to three additional venues; the Diggs Gallery, Winston-Salem State University, City Museum in St. Louis, Missouri, and the Brauer Museum of Art in Valparaiso, Indiana.

In 2007, the University of Wisconsin–Milwaukee Union Art Gallery hosted Meditations & Revelations: The Work of Lauren Grossman & Prophet William Blackmon, an exhibition of Blackmon's work intermingled with pieces by Seattle-based artist Lauren Grossman, whose work addresses the "meanings of Judeo/Christian imagery in contemporary culture". The show included a screening of the documentary God's Spaceship: A Conversation with Prophet William Blackmon.

Blackmon's paintings are in the collections of the Smithsonian American Art Museum in Washington, D.C., the American Visionary Art Museum in Baltimore, the American Folk Art Museum in New York, and the Milwaukee Art Museum. His works are on permanent display at both the Center Street Library and the East Library in Milwaukee.
