= Julie Blackmon =

American photographer (born 1966)

Julie Blackmon (born 1966 in Springfield, Missouri) is a photographer who lives and works in Missouri. Blackmon's photographs are inspired by her experience of growing up in a large family, her current role as both mother and photographer, and the timelessness of family dynamics. As the oldest of nine children and mother to three, Blackmon uses her own family members and household to "move beyond the documentary to explore the fantastic elements of our everyday lives."

== Work ==
Blackmon studied art at Missouri State University where she became interested in photography and the work of photographers such as Sally Mann and Diane Arbus.

Drawing extensively on her personal experiences and relationships, Blackmon adds an element of humor and fantasy to create works that touch on both the everyday and the fictitious.

Mind Games, Blackmon’s first major body of work, explores childhood play through a series of black and white images. In 2004, the series won her an honorable mention in Project Competition (Note: Project Competition's web page is here.) hosted by the Santa Fe Center for Photography and a merit award from the Society of Contemporary Photography in Kansas City, MO.

Following Mind Games, Blackmon switched to color film, and created the body of work Domestic Vacations. Its photographs of family life appear at once disorderly and playful and at times impossible. Blackmon says that the images in her series Domestic Vacations recall the tableaux of 17th-century Dutch and Flemish painters, notably the chaotic familial scenes of Jan Steen. Tailored environments and carefully placed props are often a feature of her work.

Blackmon’s most recent monograph of work, Homegrown, picks up where Domestic Vacations left off. Following the same formula developed in Domestic Vacations, Homegrown demonstrates a further refinement of technique in regards to composition and structure. Where the previous collection was set primarily within the confines of the home, Homegrown looks to those places outside the house that are common in one’s upbringing. The local market, beauty salon and fields behind the house are equally familiar to us and shape our childhood just as much as our homes do. It is these locales that become the backdrop for disjointed scenes; in Picnic three babies sit in a pram overlooking the layout for a picnic while not far off men are shooting birds with shotguns.

== Publications ==
Blackmon’s photographs have appeared in Time, The New Yorker, and Oxford American. In 2008, a monograph of Blackmon's work was published as Domestic Vacations. In 2014, her second monograph, Homegrown, was published. In 2015, Homegrown won the National Silver at the Independent Publisher Book Awards. Blackmon has most recently been featured in an article by the New York Times, featuring her work as well as her story of her career and her ties with her hometown of Springfield, Missouri.
