= Clarence Blackmon =

American basketball player (1942–2011)

Biographical details
- Born: December 23, 1942; Tuscaloosa, Alabama, U.S.
- Died: March 1, 2011 (aged 68); Bessemer, Alabama, U.S.

Playing career
- 1962–1963: Colorado State
- Position: Forward

Coaching career (HC unless noted)
- 1967–1971: Demopolis HS
- 1971–1972: Alabama A&M (assistant)
- 1972–1981: Alabama A&M
- 198?–19??: Jess Lanier HS
- 19??–2011: Bessemer City HS

Head coaching record
- Overall: 111–119 (college)

Accomplishments and honors

Championships
- 2 SIAC regular season (1975, 1976); 2 SIAC tournament (1975, 1976)

Clarence Blackmon Jr. (December 23, 1942 – March 1, 2011) was an American basketball coach. He was Alabama A&M University's head men's basketball coach from 1972 to 1981 and compiled a 111–119 overall record.

== Head coaching record ==
=== College ===
Record table
Season	Team	Overall	Conference	Standing	Postseason
Alabama A&M Bulldogs (Southern Intercollegiate Athletic Conference) (1972–1981)
1972–73	Alabama A&M	7–15			
1973–74	Alabama A&M	7–16			
1974–75	Alabama A&M	18–11		1st	
1975–76	Alabama A&M	18–10		1st	
1976–77	Alabama A&M	17–8			
1977–78	Alabama A&M	9–13			
1978–79	Alabama A&M	10–17			
1979–80	Alabama A&M	9–18			
1980–81	Alabama A&M	16–11			
Alabama A&M:		111–119 (.483)			
Total:		111–119 (.483)			
