= Maren Aardahl =

Norwegian handball player (born 1994)

Maren Nyland Aardahl
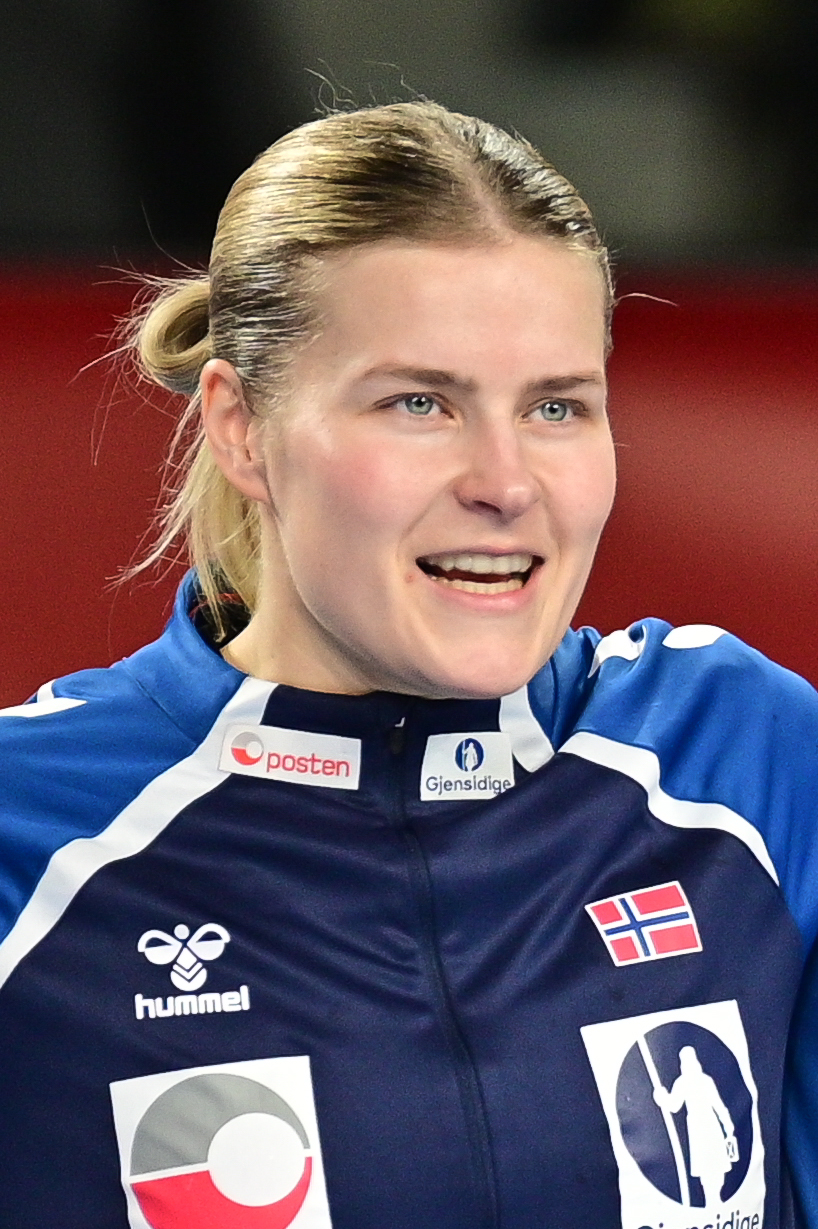
- Aardahl in 2024

Personal information
- Full name: Maren Nyland Aardahl
- Nationality: Norwegian
- Born: 2 March 1994 (age 32) Trondheim, Norway
- Height: 1.83 m (6 ft 0 in)

Sport
- Sport: Handball
- Position: Pivot
- Current club: Odense Håndbold
- Number: 3

Youth career
- Years: Team
- 2000–2012: Byåsen IL

Senior clubs
- Years: Team
- 2012–2019: Byåsen HE
- 2019–2020: SG BBM Bietigheim
- 2020–2021: SCM Râmnicu Vâlcea
- 2021–: Odense Håndbold
National team
Years	Team	Apps	(Gls)
2021–	Norway	91	(170)
Medal record
Olympic Games
Gold medal – first place	2024 Paris	Team
World Championship
Gold medal – first place	2021 Spain
Gold medal – first place	2025 Germany/Netherlands
Silver medal – second place	2023 Denmark/Norway/Sweden
European Championship
Gold medal – first place	2022 Slovenia/North Macedonia/Montenegro
Gold medal – first place	2024 Austria/Hungary/Switzerland

Maren Nyland Aardahl (born 2 March 1994) is a Norwegian handball player for Odense Håndbold and the Norwegian national team.

Aardahl started her career as a back, but retrained as a pivot. She also has medals from competing at beach handball championships for Norway.

In addition to regular handball, Aardahl also plays beach handball.

== Career ==
Aardahl started playing at her hometown club Byåsen IL and entered the senior team in 2012.

In the summer of 2019 she transferred to the German Bundesliga team SG BBM Bietigheim. She played there for one season, before switching to Romanian team SCM Râmnicu Vâlcea. A year later she signed for Danish team Odense Håndbold. In the 2024-25 season, she achieved a perfect regular season with Odense Håndbold, winning 26 of 26 games. Later the same season she won the Danish Championship, when Odense beat Team Esbjerg in the final 2-1 in matches.

On October 10, 2021 she played her first match for the Norwegian national team in a win against Slovenia. Right after she was on the Norwegian team that won the 2021 World Women's Handball Championship in Spain.

At the 2022 European Championship, she and Norway won gold. A year later, she won silver medals at the 2023 World Championship, losing to France in the final.

At the 2024 Olympics, she won gold medals with the Norwegian team, completing her set of international titles. Later that year she won the 2024 European Championship, beating Denmark in the final.

At the 2025 World Championship she was part of the Norwegian team that won World Cup gold medals.

== Achievements ==
- Olympic Games:
  - Winner: 2024
- World Championship:
  - Winner: 2021, 2025
  - Silver Medalist: 2023
- European Championship
  - Winner: 2022, 2024
- EHF Champions League:
  - Silver: 2025
- Norwegian League:
  - Silver Medalist: 2012/2013, 2013/2014
- Danish League:
  - Winner: 2020/2021, 2021/2022, 2024/2025
  - Silver: 2026

== Individual awards ==
- All-Star Best Defender of the Romanian League: 2021
