= Blachman =

2013 Danish talk show started by Thomas Blachman

- Genre: Talk show
- Created by: Thomas Blachman
- Directed by: Stevan Treshow
- Country of origin: Denmark
- No. of seasons: 1
- No. of episodes: 6

Production
- Executive producers: Dorte Borregaard; Sofia Fromberg
- Producer: Sussan Treshow
- Production company: Nordisk Film TV

Original release
- Network: DR2
- Release: April 2 – May 7, 2013

Blachman is a 2013 Danish talk show started by Thomas Blachman. The program features a woman in a bathrobe, walking into a black TV-studio, stepping into a spotlight, and getting naked in front of a male guest and Blachman himself, both sitting on a leather couch. The two men start talking about the beauty of the female body and their own roles as males.

The nude female - representing all ages and shapes - and the male guest, changes on every episode.

== Episodes ==
There are a total of six episodes and one season of Blachman. The episodes and male guests are listed here:

Season 1:

1. Jan Sonnergaard (April 2, 2013)

2. Erik Brandt (April 9, 2013)

3. Henrik Vibskov (April 16, 2013)

4. Simon Jul (April 23, 2013)

5. Shaka Loveless (April 30, 2013)

6. Sten Hegeler (May 7, 2013)
