= Robyn Blackman =

New Zealand field hockey player

Robyn Elaine Blackman (born 12 March 1959 in Carterton, New Zealand) is a former field hockey player from New Zealand, who was a member of the national team that finished sixth at the 1984 Summer Olympics in Los Angeles.
