= Henny Reistad =

Norwegian handball player (born 1999)

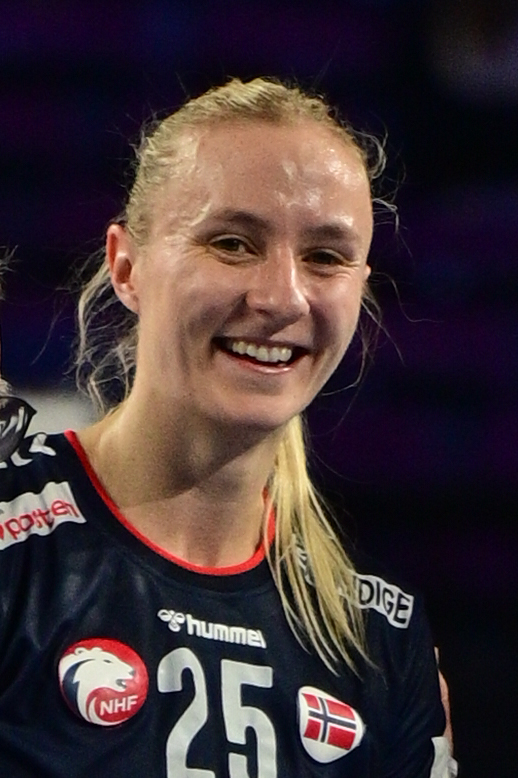
- Reistad in 2024

Personal information
- Full name: Henny Ella Reistad
- Nationality: Norwegian
- Born: 9 February 1999 (age 27) Bærum, Norway
- Height: 1.81 m (5 ft 11 in)

Sport
- Sport: Handball
- Position: Left/centre back
- Current club: Team Esbjerg
- Number: 25

Youth career
- Years: Team
- –: Helset IF

Senior clubs
- Years: Team
- 2015–2018: Stabæk IF
- 2018–2021: Vipers Kristiansand
- 2021–2027: Team Esbjerg
- 2027–: Brest Bretagne Handball
National team
Years	Team	Apps	(Gls)
2018–	Norway	126	(598)
Medal record
Olympic Games
Gold medal – first place	2024 Paris	Team
Bronze medal – third place	2020 Tokyo	Team
World Championship
Gold medal – first place	2021 Spain
Gold medal – first place	2025 Germany/Netherlands
Silver medal – second place	2023 Denmark/Norway/Sweden
European Championship
Gold medal – first place	2020 Denmark
Gold medal – first place	2022 Slovenia/North Macedonia/Montenegro
Gold medal – first place	2024 Austria/Hungary/Switzerland
Junior World Championship
Silver medal – second place	2018 Hungary

Henny Ella Reistad (born 9 February 1999) is a Norwegian professional handball player for Team Esbjerg and the Norwegian national team. She is widely considered one of the best players of her generation. She is famous for her agility and ability to take on defenders in one-on-ones.

In September 2018, she was included by EHF in a list of the twenty best young handballers to watch for the future.

In 2023, she was named best player in the world by the International Handball Federation. In 2024, she won the award for the second time in a row, and in 2025 for a third time in a row.

== Career ==
=== Stabæk ===
Reistads senior debut came on 19 December 2015, for the Norwegian first division (second tier) team Stabæk Håndbold.

The same season, she and the club was promoted to the top division of Norway, Eliteserien.

=== Vipers ===
In 2018, she joined Norwegian top club Vipers Kristiansand. Here she won the Norwegian Championship in 2019, 2020, and 2021 and the Norwegian cup in 2019. She won the EHF Champions League in 2021. In the Final Four, she was named the MVP.

=== Esbjerg ===
In 2021, she joined Danish side Team Esbjerg. Here she won the 2023 and 2024 Danish Championship, and the 2021 and 2022 Danish Cup. The club also reached the Final Four of the EHF Champions League for the first time in her first season. They did however only manage to get a 4th place at the event.

In the 2021–22 season, she was named the best centre back in the division all star team. Esbjerg did however lose the final to Odense Håndbold. In 2021 and 2022, she was named Danish player of the year. In the 2024–25 season Esbjerg reached the final once again, but this time they lost to Odense Håndbold. In 2026 she was named IHF World Player of the Year for a third time in a row.

=== National team ===
She represented Norway in the 2017 Women's Junior European Handball Championship, placing 7th, and in the 2016 Women's Youth World Handball Championship, placing 4th. At the U-20 World Championship, she won silver medals with the Norwegian team, and was named in the all star team.

She debuted for the Norwegian national team on 22 November 2018. Her first major international tournament was the 2018 European Women's Handball Championship, where she scored 18 goals. Norway only got a disappointing fifth place however.

She won the 2020 European Championship with the Norwegian team. In the tournament, she scored 29 goals.

In 2021 she won bronze medals at the 2020 Olympics.

Reistad won a gold medal at the 2021 World Women's Handball Championship and was made the All Star team as best left back.

At the 2022 European Championship, Norway defended their title, and Reistad was named tournament MVP.

At the 2023 World Championship on home soil, she won a silver medal with the Norwegian team, losing to France in the final. In the semifinal against Denmark, she scored 15 goals, which is a Norwegian record for most goals scored by a single player in a World cup match and national team match. Reistad was named in the tournament all star team.

At the 2024 Olympics, she won a gold medal with the national team, on her second attempt.

In October 2024, Reistad became the team captain for the Norwegian national team.

Two months later, she won her third European Championship at the 2024 European Championship, and made the All Star Team as best centre back.

At the 2025 World Championship she won another gold medal. Norway won every match, and only the final against Germany with less than 9 goals. Henny Reistad was the tournament MVP as well as the top scorer. However, in the final she went the entire first half without scoring a goal.

== Personal life ==
Reistad is the great-granddaughter of Norwegian athlete Ole Reistad, who competed at the 1928 Olympics in modern pentathlon.

In January 2024, Reistad donated an undisclosed amount of money to her former club, Vipers Kristiansand, which were in economic trouble. Ultimately, the club would go bankrupt regardless a year later.

== Achievements ==
- Olympic Games:
  - Winner: 2024
  - Bronze: 2020
- World Championship:
  - Winner: 2021, 2025
  - Silver: 2023
- European Championship:
  - Winner: 2020, 2022, 2024
- Junior World Championship:
  - Silver Medalist: 2018
- EHF Champions League:
  - Winner: 2020–21
  - Bronze medalist: 2018–19, 2023–24, 2024–25
  - Semifinalist: 2021–22
- Norwegian League:
  - Winner: 2018–19, 2019–20, 2020–21
- Norwegian Cup:
  - Winner: 2018, 2019, 2020
  - Finalist: 2017
- Danish League:
  - Winner: 2023, 2024, 2026
- Danish Cup:
  - Winner: 2021, 2022, 2023, 2024

== Individual awards ==
MVP

- IHF World Player of the Year: 2023, 2024, 2025
- MVP of the World Championship: 2023, 2025
- Danish Cup MVP: 2023, 2024
- MVP of the European Championship: 2022
- MVP of the EHF Champions League Final Four: 2021
- EHF Excellence Awards MVP of the season: 2024–25

All-Star Team

- EHF Excellence Awards All Star Centre Back of the season: 2022–23, 2024–25, All Star Left Back of the season: 2023–24
- All-Star Centre Back of the European Championship: 2024
- All Star Left Back of the World Handball Championship: 2021
- All-Star Young Player of the EHF Champions League: 2021
- All-Star Centre Back of Eliteserien: 2018–19, 2020–21
- All-Star Centre Back of the Junior World Championship: 2018
- All-Star Left Back of the Junior European Championship: 2017
- All-Star Left Back of Eliteserien: 2017–18

Others

- Top Scorer of the 2025 World Women's Handball Championship: (55 goals)
- Top Scorer of EHF Champions League: 2022–23 (142 goals), 2024-25 (154 goals)
- Top Scorer of Danish Handball League 2021–22 (245 goals) and 2022–23 (204 goals)
- Danish League Player of the Year: 2021, 2022, 2023, 2024
- Player Of The Year Norway: 2018–19, 2020–21, 2021–22, 2022–23, 2023–24, 2024–25
- Best Player of Eliteserien: 2018–19, 2020–21
- Best Rookie of Eliteserien: 2017–18
