= Luther Meade Blackman =

Luther Meade Blackman (February 14, 1834–July 11, 1919) was an American engraver. He was born in Sandy Hook, Newtown, in Fairfield County, Connecticut to Denman (or Denmon) and Elizabeth Jane Shepard Blackman. His parents were married January 6, 1831. He was second of six children. Years after Blackman's death, he was accused of forging the Bat Creek Inscription of 1889.

== Bat Creek stone ==
Luther Blackman was accused of forging the Bat Creek stone, which was found in a burial mound in 1889. The theory of Blackman being the forger has not gained much support. However, Lowell Kirk, who lives on Bat Creek, is convinced that Blackman is the forger. Blackman was an engraver who lived near the Tipton farm. He was also a neighbor of Jim Lawson. Blackman held a Federal Patronage job from 1870 to about 1890. It was during this time that President Grover Cleveland created the 1883 Pendleton Act to fix the Pensions Claims Office and the Postal Service. Cleveland let many Republicans be replaced by Democrats, and this increased the tension between the Democratic and Republican parties. It has been suggested that the L. C. Houk political machine that ran the Republicans in East Tennessee might have had Blackman create the stone to improve the chances to remove John W. Emmert and other Democrats from their positions.
