= Tim Blackman =

Sociologist and university executive

Vice-chancellor of the Open University
- In office 1 October 2019 – October 2024

Vice-chancellor of the Middlesex University
- In office 2015–2019
- Succeeded by: Nic Beech

Personal details
- Born: Gravesend, Kent, UK
- Education: Durham University
- Occupation: Academic

Tim Blackman is a British academic. He has been the vice-chancellor of the Open University since October 2019. It was announced in 2024 that owing to ill-health he would step-down from his position. He previously was the vice-chancellor of Middlesex University from 2015 to 2019.

At The Open University he was partly responsible for moving 4000+ teaching staff onto permanent contracts and soon after he initiated the institute's first use of 'fire and rehire' of Associate Lecturers, The Open University disputes this characterisation of events. The measures were introduced to end the practice of Associate Lecturers working excessive hours, with some lecturers having contracts totalling in excess of 100 hours a week.

== Education and career ==
After graduating with a degree in geography from Durham University, Blackman started his career as a community worker in Belfast, before completing a PhD in urban sociology.

He was the deputy dean of the Faculty of Social Sciences at the Oxford Brookes University, and also the dean of social sciences and at Teesside University.

Blackman, a fellow of Academy of Social Sciences and Royal Society of Arts, was the assessor of Social Policy and Social Work in the England Research Excellence Framework. He was a founding member of the Community Technical Aid and the Oxford Dementia Centre.
