= 1948 Olympics =

1948 Olympics may refer to:

- The 1948 Winter Olympics, which were held in St. Moritz, Switzerland
- The 1948 Summer Olympics, which were held in London, United Kingdom
