= Mie Højlund =

Danish handball player (born 1997)

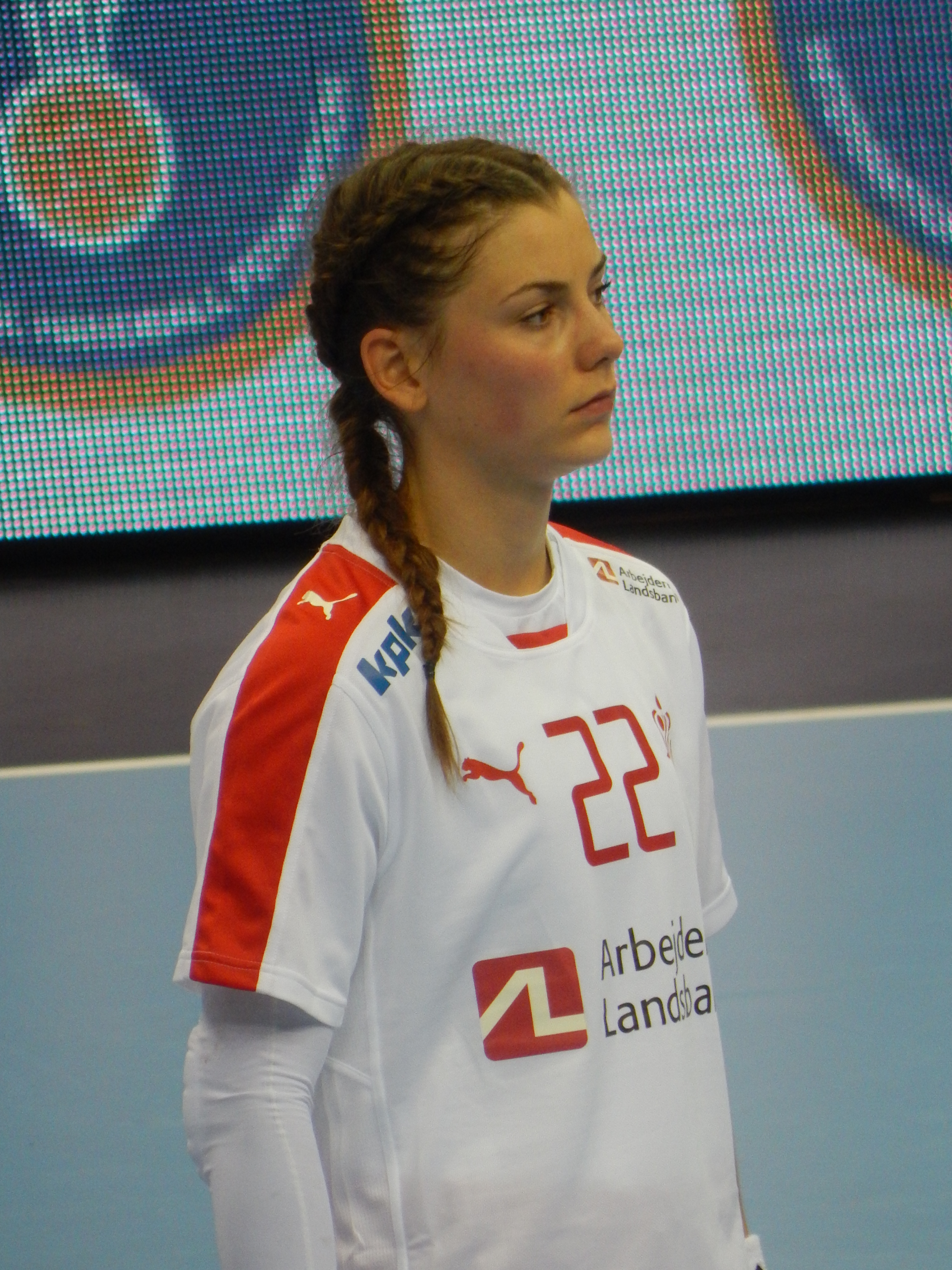
- Højlund in 2016

Personal information
- Full name: Mie Enggrob Højlund
- Nationality: Danish
- Born: 24 October 1997 (age 28) Voldum, Favrskov, Denmark
- Height: 1.75 m (5 ft 9 in)

Sport
- Sport: Handball
- Position: Left back / Right back
- Current club: Odense Håndbold
- Number: 32

Senior clubs
- Years: Team
- 2014–2017: Randers HK
- 2017–: Odense Håndbold
National team
Years	Team	Apps	(Gls)
2016–	Denmark	122	(252)
Medal record
Olympic Games
Bronze medal – third place	2024 Paris	Team
World Championship
Bronze medal – third place	2021 Spain
Bronze medal – third place	2023 Denmark/Norway/Sweden
European Championship
Silver medal – second place	2022 Slovenia/North Macedonia/Montenegro
Silver medal – second place	2024 Austria/Hungary/Switzerland
IHF Junior World Championship
Gold medal – first place	2016 Russia
IHF Youth World Championship
Bronze medal – third place	2014 Macedonia
European Junior Championship
Gold medal – first place	2015 Spain

Mie Enggrob Højlund (born 24 October 1997) is a Danish handball player for Odense Håndbold and the Danish national team.

Højlund can play both right back and left back, but has said publicly, that she prefers the left back position.

== Club career ==
Højlund played on the Randers HK youth teams, and in 2014 she became a part of the senior team. She scored a total of 30 goals in her debut season. In the first years she was the back up to national team player Jane Schumacher. In the fall of 2016 she became the first choice on the playmaker position. That season Randers HK won the Danish Women's Handball Cup with a surprise win over FC Midtjylland Håndbold. She ended the season as the second top scorer in the league with 89 goals.

This prompted a move to the Danish top club Odense Håndbold, with whom she came second in the 2017–18 Damehåndboldligaen. In the 2017 Mie Højlund played in a cup match against Aarhus United without being eligible, and Aarhus United was afterwards awarded the win. In 2019 she further extended the contract at Odense Håndbold until 2024. In 2021 she won the Danish Championship for the first time, as well as second Danish cup. In the 2024-25 season, she achieved a perfect regular season with Odense Håndbold, winning 26 of 26 games. Later the same season she won the Danish Championship, when Odense beat Team Esbjerg in the final 2–1 in matches.

== National team career ==
Højlund was part of the Danish youth teams that saw success in the middle of the 2010s. She was part of the team that won u-19 Euroes 2015 in Spain followed by the U-19 World Cup in Russia. This together with her success at Randers HK prompted national team coach Klavs Bruun Jørgensen to call her up against Norway in October 2016.

She was initially called up to the national team for the 2016 European Women's Handball Championship, but rejected it due to exams. The next years 2017 World Women's Handball Championship she missed due to a shoulder injury.

Her first major international tournament was thus the 2018 European Women's Handball Championship in France. Denmark went out in the main round.

She was part of the Danish team that won bronze medals at the 2021 World Women's Handball Championship in Spain and the 2023 World Women's Handball Championship in Denmark/Norway/Sweden. At the 2022 European Women's Handball Championship she won silver medals with the Danish team.

At the 2024 Olympics she won another bronze medals. Later the same year, she won silver medals at the 2024 European Championship, losing to Norway in the final.

She missed the 2025 World Championship due to injury. In her comeback match for Denmark in March 2026, she broke her thumb.

== Achievements ==
- Danish League:
  - Winner: 2021, 2022, 2025
- Danish Cup
  - Winner: 2020
- EHF Champions League:
  - Silver: 2025

== Individual awards ==
- Youth player of the Year in Damehåndboldligaen: 2015/16, 2016/17
