= Arne Blach =

Danish field hockey player (1900–1977)

Arne Mollerup Blach (8 July 1900 – 11 July 1977) was a Danish field hockey player who competed in the 1928 Summer Olympics and in the 1936 Summer Olympics.

He was born in Copenhagen and died in Helsingør. He was the younger brother of Niels Blach and Ejvind Blach and the father of Preben Mollerup Blach and Flemming Mollerup Blach.

In 1928 he was a member of the Danish team which was eliminated in the first round of the Olympic tournament after two wins and two losses. He played all four matches as forward.

Eight years later he was eliminated with the Danish team in the first round of the 1936 Olympic tournament. He played one match.
