= Matea Pletikosić =

Croatian handball player (born 1998)

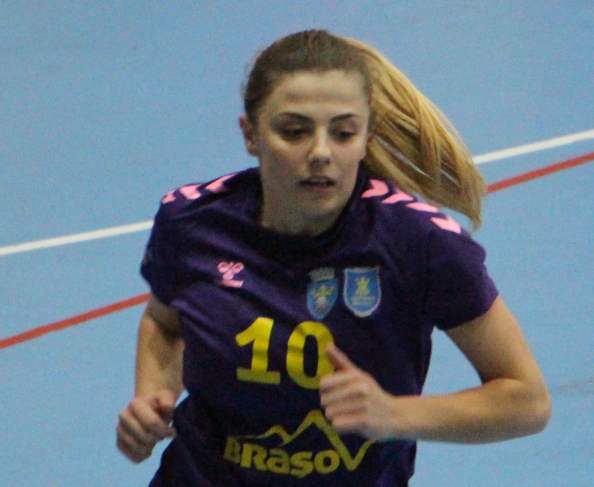

Personal information
- Nationality: Croatian; Montenegrin
- Born: 24 April 1998 (age 28) Sinj, Croatia
- Height: 1.69 m (5 ft 7 in)

Sport
- Sport: Handball
- Position: Centre back
- Current club: RK Podravka Koprivnica
- Number: 10

Youth career
- Years: Team
- 2006–2015: ŽRK Sinj

Senior clubs
- Years: Team
- 2015–2020: ŽRK Budućnost Podgorica
- 2020–2021: RK Krim
- 2021–2023: ŽRK Budućnost Podgorica
- 2023: Al Ahly
- 2023–2024: CSM Corona Brașov
- 2024–: RK Podravka Koprivnica
National team
Years	Team	Apps	(Gls)
2020–	Montenegro	76	(167)
Medal record
European Championship
Bronze medal – third place	2022 Slovenia/ Macedonia/Montenegro

Matea Šošo (née Pletikosić; born 24 April 1998) is a Croatian-born Montenegrin handball player for RK Podravka Koprivnica and the Montenegrin national team.

She played for Croatia in youth categories, but chose to play for Montenegro on a senior level. She represented Croatia at the 2015 European Women's Youth Handball Championship in Macedonia.

She represented Montenegro at the 2020 European Women's Handball Championship.

== Individual awards ==
- All-Star Centre Back of the EHF U-17 European Championship: 2015
