= 1928 Olympics =

1928 Olympics may refer to:

- The 1928 Winter Olympics, which were held in St. Moritz, Switzerland
- The 1928 Summer Olympics, which were held in Amsterdam, Netherlands
