= Anna Kristensen =

Danish handball player (born 2000)

Personal information
- Full name: Anna Opstrup Kristensen
- Nationality: Danish
- Born: 25 October 2000 (age 26) Skanderborg, Denmark
- Height: 1.81 m (5 ft 11 in)

Sport
- Sport: Handball
- Position: Goalkeeper
- Current club: Ferencvárosi TC
- Number: 12

Youth career
- Years: Team
- 2009–2018: Skanderborg Håndbold

Senior clubs
- Years: Team
- 2017–2019: Skanderborg Håndbold
- 2019–2023: Viborg HK
- 02/2023–2026: Team Esbjerg
- 2026–: Ferencvárosi TC
National team
| Years | Team | Apps | (Gls) |
| 2019– | Denmark | 62 | (0) |
Medal record
World Championship
| Bronze medal – third place | 2021 Spain |
| Bronze medal – third place | 2023 Denmark/Norway/Sweden |
European Championship
| Silver medal – second place | 2022 Slovenia/North Macedonia/Montenegro |
| Silver medal – second place | 2024 Austria/Hungary/Switzerland |
- Updated on 12 April 2026

Anna Opstrup Kristensen (born 25 October 2000) is a Danish handball player for Ferencvárosi TC and the Danish national team.

She also represented Denmark in the 2017 European Women's U-17 Handball Championship, 2018 Women's Youth World Handball Championship, and in the 2019 Women's Junior European Handball Championship, placing 6th all three times.

== Career ==
Anna Kristensen started playing for her local club Skanderborg Håndbold, before she switched to Danish top club Viborg HK. In her first season at the club they came third in the league, and Kristensen won the best goalkeeper in the league award.

At the end of 2022, she signed a pre-contract with league rivals Team Esbjerg, which was supposed to start in the summer of 2023. However, due to Esbjerg lacking options at the goalkeeper position, they agreed that she would join the club already in January 2023. The same season, she won the Danish Women's Handball Cup with Esbjerg and won the Årets Pokalfighter (cup fighter of the year) award.

In November 2025 she announced that she would join Hungarian Ferencvárosi TC after the 2025–26 season.

In April 2026 she was injured and was out for the rest of the 2025-26 season. When the other Esbjerg keeper Katharina Filter was also injured, Esbjerg brought Silje Solberg-Østhassel in as a replacement. Despite the injury problems, Esbjerg would go on to win the Danish Championship, beating Odense Håndbold in the final.

== National team ==
She made her debut on the Danish national team on 21 March 2019. She did however not initially see much playing time as Sandra Toft and Althea Reinhardt was preferred ahead of her.

Her championship debut came at the 2021 World Women's Handball Championship, where she was part of the team winning bronze medals, but she was never a part of the match squad. At the 2022 European Women's Handball Championship, she was part of winning the silver medal, but yet again she never entered the match squad.

She also won bronze medals at the 2023 World Women's Handball Championship, although she was definitely still a third choice behind Toft and Reinhardt, only having played a single match. At the 2024 Summer Olympics, Kristensen was a back-up, but never a part of the actual squad.

At the 2024 European Women's Handball Championship Danish head coach Jesper Jensen surprisingly chose to pick her instead of 2021 IHF World Player of the Year winner and Danish national team captain Sandra Toft, winning silver medails. This was a wise choice, as Kristensen both was chosen as the championships Most Valuable Player and a part of the All Star Team as best goalkeeper. Toft was later in the tournament called to the squad, when Reinhardt became injured.

Following another injury to Althea Reinhardt, Kristensen entered the 2025 World Women's Handball Championship as the definitive Danish first choice with Amalie Milling as her partner. Denmark went out in the quarterfinal to France after winning all matches in the group stages. The Danish team was affected by a lot of players missing the tournament including goalkeepers Sandra Toft and Althea Reinhardt and pivots Sarah Iversen and Rikke Iversen. This was the first time since 2019 that Denmark left a major international tournament without any medals.

== Achievements ==
- Damehåndboldligaen:
  - Winner: 2023, 2024, 2026
  - Silver Medalist: 2021, 2025
  - Bronze Medalist: 2020
- Danish Women's Handball Cup:
  - Winner: 2022, 2024
- EHF Champions League
  - Bronze Medalist: 2024-25

== Individual awards ==
- MVP of the European Championship: 2024
- All-Star Goalkeeper of the European Championship: 2024
- Best Goalkeeper of Damehåndboldligaen: 2019/20
- Player of the Year Viborg HK: 2020
- All-Star Goalkeeper of Damehåndboldligaen: 2019/2020, 2020/2021
- Youth player of the Year in Damehåndboldligaen: 2019/2020, 2020/21
- MVP of the Danish Women's Handball Cup Final four 2022
