= 2022–23 Women's EHF Champions League knockout stage =

The 2022–23 Women's EHF Champions League knockout stage began on 18 March with the playoffs and ended on 4 June 2023 with the final at the MVM Dome in Budapest, Hungary, to decide the winners of the 2022–23 Women's EHF Champions League. A total of twelve teams competed in the knockout phase.

== Format ==
In the playoffs, the eight teams ranked 2nd–6th in Groups A and B played against each other in two-legged home-and-away matches. The four winning teams advanced to the quarterfinals, where they were joined by the top-two teams of Groups A and B for another round of two-legged home-and-away matches. The four quarterfinal winners qualified for the final four tournament at the MVM Dome in Budapest, Hungary.

== Qualified teams ==
The top six teams from Groups A and B qualified for the knockout stage.

Group	Qualified for quarterfinals		Qualified for playoffs			
Group	First place	Second place	Third place	Fourth place	Fifth place	Sixth place
A	(Norway) Vipers Kristiansand	(Romania) CSM București	(Denmark) Odense Håndbold	(Hungary) FTC-Rail Cargo Hungaria	(Slovenia) RK Krim Mercator	(France) Brest Bretagne Handball
B	(France) Metz Handball	(Hungary) Győri Audi ETO KC	(Denmark) Team Esbjerg	(Romania) CS Rapid București	(Montenegro) WHC Budućnost BEMAX	(Norway) Storhamar Håndball Elite

All times are UTC+2 (matches on 18, 19 and 25 March are UTC+1).

== Playoffs ==
=== Overview ===
Team 1	Agg.	Team 2	1st leg	2nd leg
Storhamar Håndball Elite (Norway)	52–60	(Denmark) Odense Håndbold	22–30	30–30
Brest Bretagne Handball (France)	49–55	(Denmark) Team Esbjerg	25–28	24–27
WHC Budućnost BEMAX (Montenegro)	46–55	(Hungary) FTC-Rail Cargo Hungaria	24–28	22–27
RK Krim Mercator (Slovenia)	53–54	(Romania) CS Rapid București	29–24	24–30

==== Matches ====
18 March 2023; 18:00	Storhamar Håndball Elite (Norway)	22–30	(Denmark) Odense Håndbold	Boligpartner Arena, Hamar; Attendance: 1,045; Referees: Ilieva, Karbeska (MKD)
18 March 2023; 18:00	Venn 6	(13–16)	Abbingh, Housheer 5	Boligpartner Arena, Hamar; Attendance: 1,045; Referees: Ilieva, Karbeska (MKD)
18 March 2023; 18:00	2× (suspension)	Report	1× (yellow card) 6× (suspension)	Boligpartner Arena, Hamar; Attendance: 1,045; Referees: Ilieva, Karbeska (MKD)

25 March 2023; 18:00	Odense Håndbold (Denmark)	30–30	(Norway) Storhamar Håndball Elite	Sydbank Arena Odense, Odense; Attendance: 2,117; Referees: Lovin, Stancu (ROU)
25 March 2023; 18:00	Iversen, Van Wetering 6	(13–16)	Obaidli 10	Sydbank Arena Odense, Odense; Attendance: 2,117; Referees: Lovin, Stancu (ROU)
25 March 2023; 18:00	1× (yellow card)	Report	1× (yellow card) 4× (suspension)	Sydbank Arena Odense, Odense; Attendance: 2,117; Referees: Lovin, Stancu (ROU)

Odense Håndbold won 60–52 on aggregate.

19 March 2023; 16:00	Brest Bretagne Handball (France)	25–28	(Denmark) Team Esbjerg	Brest Arena, Brest; Attendance: 3,562; Referees: Palačković, Backović (SLO)
19 March 2023; 16:00	Fauske 7	(15–15)	Reistad 8	Brest Arena, Brest; Attendance: 3,562; Referees: Palačković, Backović (SLO)
19 March 2023; 16:00	4× (suspension)	Report	5× (suspension)	Brest Arena, Brest; Attendance: 3,562; Referees: Palačković, Backović (SLO)

26 March 2023; 14:00	Team Esbjerg (Denmark)	27–24	(France) Brest Bretagne Handball	Blue Water Dokken, Esbjerg; Attendance: 2,563; Referees: Antić, Jakovljević (SRB)
26 March 2023; 14:00	Reistad 6	(14–12)	Carlson 5	Blue Water Dokken, Esbjerg; Attendance: 2,563; Referees: Antić, Jakovljević (SRB)
26 March 2023; 14:00	1× (suspension)	Report	2× (suspension)	Blue Water Dokken, Esbjerg; Attendance: 2,563; Referees: Antić, Jakovljević (SRB)

Team Esbjerg won 55–49 on aggregate.

18 March 2023; 16:00	WHC Budućnost BEMAX (Montenegro)	24–28	(Hungary) FTC-Rail Cargo Hungaria	Morača Sports Center, Podgorica; Attendance: 1,000; Referees: Hatipoğlu, Şimşek (TUR)
18 March 2023; 16:00	Raičević 9	(13–15)	Malestein 7	Morača Sports Center, Podgorica; Attendance: 1,000; Referees: Hatipoğlu, Şimşek (TUR)
18 March 2023; 16:00	1× (yellow card) 5× (suspension)	Report	5× (suspension)	Morača Sports Center, Podgorica; Attendance: 1,000; Referees: Hatipoğlu, Şimşek (TUR)

25 March 2023; 16:00	FTC-Rail Cargo Hungaria (Hungary)	27–22	(Montenegro) WHC Budućnost BEMAX	Érd Aréna, Érd; Attendance: 2,200; Referees: Jović, Arnautović (BIH)
25 March 2023; 16:00	Malestein, Stolle 5	(14–13)	Pavićević 7	Érd Aréna, Érd; Attendance: 2,200; Referees: Jović, Arnautović (BIH)
25 March 2023; 16:00	1× (suspension)	Report	1× (yellow card) 1× (suspension)	Érd Aréna, Érd; Attendance: 2,200; Referees: Jović, Arnautović (BIH)

FTC-Rail Cargo Hungaria won 55–46 on aggregate.

19 March 2023; 14:00	RK Krim Mercator (Slovenia)	29–24	(Romania) CS Rapid București	Arena Stožice, Ljubljana; Attendance: 4,800; Referees: Hannes, Hannes (GER)
19 March 2023; 14:00	Radičević, Stanko 8	(12–13)	Kanor 5	Arena Stožice, Ljubljana; Attendance: 4,800; Referees: Hannes, Hannes (GER)
19 March 2023; 14:00	1× (yellow card) 4× (suspension)	Report	5× (suspension)	Arena Stožice, Ljubljana; Attendance: 4,800; Referees: Hannes, Hannes (GER)

26 March 2023; 16:00	CS Rapid București (Romania)	30–24	(Slovenia) RK Krim Mercator	Polyvalent Hall, Bucharest; Attendance: 5,000; Referees: Sá, Sá (POR)
26 March 2023; 16:00	Polman 8	(12–8)	Rosiak 7	Polyvalent Hall, Bucharest; Attendance: 5,000; Referees: Sá, Sá (POR)
26 March 2023; 16:00	1× (yellow card) 2× (suspension)	Report	2× (yellow card) 5× (suspension) 1× (red card)	Polyvalent Hall, Bucharest; Attendance: 5,000; Referees: Sá, Sá (POR)

CS Rapid București won 54–53 on aggregate.

== Quarterfinals ==
=== Overview ===
Team 1	Agg.	Team 2	1st leg	2nd leg
CS Rapid București (Romania)	56–71	(Norway) Vipers Kristiansand	25–31	31–40
FTC-Rail Cargo Hungaria (Hungary)	59–58	(France) Metz Handball	26–32	33–26
Team Esbjerg (Denmark)	65–59	(Romania) CSM București	32–28	33–31
Odense Håndbold (Denmark)	55–66	(Hungary) Győri Audi ETO KC	27–29	28–37

==== Matches ====
30 April 2023; 14:00	CS Rapid București (Romania)	25–31	(Norway) Vipers Kristiansand	Polyvalent Hall, Bucharest; Attendance: 5,000; Referees: Vujačić, Kažanegra (MNE)
30 April 2023; 14:00	Grozav 5	(12–18)	Vyakhireva 7	Polyvalent Hall, Bucharest; Attendance: 5,000; Referees: Vujačić, Kažanegra (MNE)
30 April 2023; 14:00	1× (yellow card) 1× (suspension)	Report	3× (suspension)	Polyvalent Hall, Bucharest; Attendance: 5,000; Referees: Vujačić, Kažanegra (MNE)

6 May 2023; 16:00	Vipers Kristiansand (Norway)	40–31	(Romania) CS Rapid București	Aquarama Kristiansand, Kristiansand; Attendance: 2,000; Referees: Praštalo, Balvan (BIH)
6 May 2023; 16:00	Næs Andersen 7	(18–18)	Grozav 7	Aquarama Kristiansand, Kristiansand; Attendance: 2,000; Referees: Praštalo, Balvan (BIH)
6 May 2023; 16:00	4× (suspension)	Report	2× (yellow card) 5× (suspension)	Aquarama Kristiansand, Kristiansand; Attendance: 2,000; Referees: Praštalo, Balvan (BIH)

Vipers Kristiansand won 71–56 on aggregate.

29 April 2023; 16:00	FTC-Rail Cargo Hungaria (Hungary)	26–32	(France) Metz Handball	Érd Aréna, Érd; Attendance: 2,200; Referees: Metalari, Nikolovski (MKD)
29 April 2023; 16:00	Bölk, Malestein 7	(13–15)	Horacek 7	Érd Aréna, Érd; Attendance: 2,200; Referees: Metalari, Nikolovski (MKD)
29 April 2023; 16:00	1× (yellow card) 2× (suspension)	Report	1× (yellow card) 3× (suspension)	Érd Aréna, Érd; Attendance: 2,200; Referees: Metalari, Nikolovski (MKD)

7 May 2023; 14:00	Metz Handball (France)	26–33	(Hungary) FTC-Rail Cargo Hungaria	Arènes de Metz, Metz; Attendance: 4,670; Referees: Braseth, Sundet (NOR)
7 May 2023; 14:00	Bouktit 8	(17–17)	Malestein 8	Arènes de Metz, Metz; Attendance: 4,670; Referees: Braseth, Sundet (NOR)
7 May 2023; 14:00	4× (suspension)	Report	1× (yellow card) 5× (suspension) 1× (red card)	Arènes de Metz, Metz; Attendance: 4,670; Referees: Braseth, Sundet (NOR)

FTC-Rail Cargo Hungaria won 59–58 on aggregate.

30 April 2023; 16:00	Team Esbjerg (Denmark)	32–28	(Romania) CSM București	Blue Water Dokken, Esbjerg; Attendance: 2,960; Referees: Barysas, Petrusis (LTU)
30 April 2023; 16:00	Mørk 8	(17–13)	Arntzen 10	Blue Water Dokken, Esbjerg; Attendance: 2,960; Referees: Barysas, Petrusis (LTU)
30 April 2023; 16:00	2× (suspension)	Report	1× (yellow card) 4× (suspension)	Blue Water Dokken, Esbjerg; Attendance: 2,960; Referees: Barysas, Petrusis (LTU)

7 May 2023; 16:00	CSM București (Romania)	31–33	(Denmark) Team Esbjerg	Polyvalent Hall, Bucharest; Attendance: 5,000; Referees: Álvarez, Bustamante (ESP)
7 May 2023; 16:00	Omoregie 8	(18–16)	Breistøl, Mørk 7	Polyvalent Hall, Bucharest; Attendance: 5,000; Referees: Álvarez, Bustamante (ESP)
7 May 2023; 16:00	4× (suspension) 2× (red card)	Report	1× (yellow card) 3× (suspension)	Polyvalent Hall, Bucharest; Attendance: 5,000; Referees: Álvarez, Bustamante (ESP)

Team Esbjerg won 65–59 on aggregate.

29 April 2023; 18:00	Odense Håndbold (Denmark)	27–29	(Hungary) Győri Audi ETO KC	Sydbank Arena Odense, Odense; Attendance: 2,234; Referees: Budzák, Záhradník (SVK)
29 April 2023; 18:00	Abbingh, Van Wetering 6	(17–12)	Gros 9	Sydbank Arena Odense, Odense; Attendance: 2,234; Referees: Budzák, Záhradník (SVK)
29 April 2023; 18:00	4× (suspension)	Report	4× (suspension)	Sydbank Arena Odense, Odense; Attendance: 2,234; Referees: Budzák, Záhradník (SVK)

6 May 2023; 18:00	Győri Audi ETO KC (Hungary)	37–28	(Denmark) Odense Håndbold	Audi Aréna, Győr; Attendance: 5,254; Referees: Merz, Kuttler (GER)
6 May 2023; 18:00	Gros 10	(21–14)	Van Wetering 6	Audi Aréna, Győr; Attendance: 5,254; Referees: Merz, Kuttler (GER)
6 May 2023; 18:00	1× (yellow card) 2× (suspension)	Report	4× (suspension)	Audi Aréna, Győr; Attendance: 5,254; Referees: Merz, Kuttler (GER)

Győri Audi ETO KC won 66–55 on aggregate.

== Final four ==
The final four will be held at the MVM Dome in Budapest, Hungary on 3 and 4 June 2023. The draw took place on 9 May 2023.

=== Bracket ===
Semi-finals
3 June
(Hungary) Győri Audi ETO KC	35
(Norway) Vipers Kristiansand	37
3 June
(Hungary) FTC-Rail Cargo Hungaria	30
(Denmark) Team Esbjerg	29

Final
4 June
(Norway) Vipers Kristiansand	28
(Hungary) FTC-Rail Cargo Hungaria	24
Third place
4 June
(Hungary) Győri Audi ETO KC	28
(Denmark) Team Esbjerg	27

=== Semifinals ===
3 June 2023; 15:15	Győri Audi ETO KC (Hungary)	35–37	(Norway) Vipers Kristiansand	MVM Dome, Budapest; Attendance: 18,734; Referees: Covalciuc, Covalciuc (MDA)
3 June 2023; 15:15	Oftedal 11	(18–23)	Roberts 8	MVM Dome, Budapest; Attendance: 18,734; Referees: Covalciuc, Covalciuc (MDA)
3 June 2023; 15:15	1× (yellow card) 7× (suspension)	Report	3× (suspension)	MVM Dome, Budapest; Attendance: 18,734; Referees: Covalciuc, Covalciuc (MDA)

3 June 2023; 18:00	FTC-Rail Cargo Hungaria (Hungary)	30–29	(Denmark) Team Esbjerg	MVM Dome, Budapest; Attendance: 20,022; Referees: Palačković, Backović (SLO)
3 June 2023; 18:00	Malestein 7	(13–17)	Mørk, Reistad 7	MVM Dome, Budapest; Attendance: 20,022; Referees: Palačković, Backović (SLO)
3 June 2023; 18:00	1× (yellow card) 6× (suspension)	Report	5× (suspension)	MVM Dome, Budapest; Attendance: 20,022; Referees: Palačković, Backović (SLO)

=== Third place game ===
4 June 2023; 15:15	Győri Audi ETO KC (Hungary)	28–27	(Denmark) Team Esbjerg	MVM Dome, Budapest; Attendance: 18,387; Referees: Hatipoğlu, Şimşek (TUR)
4 June 2023; 15:15	Gros 6	(16–9)	Ingstad 6	MVM Dome, Budapest; Attendance: 18,387; Referees: Hatipoğlu, Şimşek (TUR)
4 June 2023; 15:15	3× (suspension)	Report	1× (yellow card) 2× (suspension)	MVM Dome, Budapest; Attendance: 18,387; Referees: Hatipoğlu, Şimşek (TUR)

=== Final ===
4 June 2023; 18:00	Vipers Kristiansand (Norway)	28–24	(Hungary) FTC-Rail Cargo Hungaria	MVM Dome, Budapest; Attendance: 20,022; Referees: Praštalo, Balvan (BIH)
4 June 2023; 18:00	Næs Andersen, Vyakhireva 6	(14–13)	Bölk, Lekić 5	MVM Dome, Budapest; Attendance: 20,022; Referees: Praštalo, Balvan (BIH)
4 June 2023; 18:00	1× (yellow card) 4× (suspension)	Report	1× (yellow card) 2× (suspension) 1× (red card)	MVM Dome, Budapest; Attendance: 20,022; Referees: Praštalo, Balvan (BIH)
