= Marit Malm Frafjord =

Norwegian handball player (born 1985)

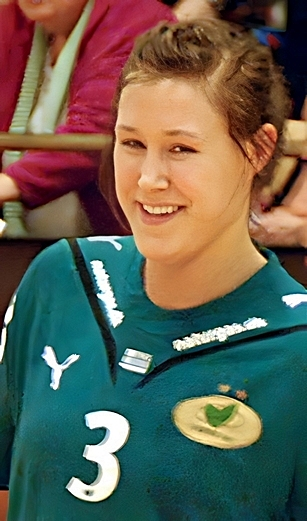
- Frafjord in 2011

Personal information
- Nationality: Norwegian
- Born: 25 November 1985 (age 40) Tromsø, Norway
- Height: 1.82 m (6 ft 0 in)

Sport
- Sport: Handball
- Position: Pivot

Senior clubs
- Years: Team
- 2001–2002: Rapp SK
- 2002–2010: Byåsen HE
- 2010–2014: Viborg HK
- 2014–2017: Larvik HK
- 2017–2018: CSM București
- 2018–2022: Team Esbjerg
National team
Years	Team	Apps	(Gls)
2005–2021	Norway	223	(424)
Medal record
Olympic Games
Gold medal – first place	2008 Beijing	Team
Gold medal – first place	2012 London	Team
Bronze medal – third place	2016 Rio de Janeiro	Team
Bronze medal – third place	2020 Tokyo	Team
World Championship
Gold medal – first place	2011 Brazil
Silver medal – second place	2007 France
Bronze medal – third place	2009 China
European Championship
Gold medal – first place	2006 Sweden
Gold medal – first place	2008 Macedonia
Gold medal – first place	2010 Denmark/Norway
Gold medal – first place	2016 Sweden
Gold medal – first place	2020 Denmark
Silver medal – second place	2012 Serbia

Marit Malm Frafjord (Note: In this article, the surname is Frafjord.) (born 25 November 1985) is a former Norwegian handball player who was part of the Norwegian team that won gold medals at both the 2011 World Championship and the 2008 Olympics and 2012 Olympics.

== Career ==
=== Byåsen ===
Frafjord started playing handball at Rapp. At 16, she joined Byåsen HE. Originally, she played as a back but retrained as a pivot at Byåsen.

With Byåsen, she reached the final of the EHF Cup Winners' Cup in 2007, but lost to Romanian CS Oltchim Râmnicu Vâlcea.

=== Viborg HK ===
In 2010, she joined Danish side Viborg HK. Here, she won the 2014 EHF Cup Winners' Cup, beating Russian Zvezda Zvenigorod in the final. Same season, she also won the Danish Championship.

=== Larvik HK ===
The following summer, she returned to Norway and joined Larvik HK. Here, she won the 2015, 2016, and 2017 Norwegian championships.

=== CSM Bucharest ===
In 2017, she joined Romanian CSM București. Here, she won the 2018 Romanian championship and Cup. After the 2017-18 season, she retired.

=== Team Esbjerg ===
In December 2018, she did however unretire to join Danish side Team Esbjerg. With Esbjerg, she won the 2019 and 2020 Danish championships and the 2021 Danish cup. In the 2021-22 season, she ultimately retired and became part of the Team Esbjerg management.

== National team ==
With the Norwegian national team, she won the European Women's Handball Championship 5 times; in 2006, 2008, 2010, 2016, and in 2020.

At the 2007 World Championship, she won silver medals. A year later she won gold medals at the 2008 Olympics. At the 2009 World Championship, she won bronze medals.

At the 2011 World Championship, she won gold medals, and a year later, she defended her olympic title, when Norway won the gold at the 2012 Olympics.

She also represented Norway at the 2016 Olympics and the 2021 Olympics. At the latter tournament, she won bronze medals.

== Post-playing career ==
At the 2024 Olympics, she acted as a handball expert for Warner Bros. Discovery.

== Achievements ==
- Champions League:
  - Bronze Medalist: 2015, 2018
- Cup Winners' Cup:
  - Winner: 2014
  - Finalist: 2007, 2012
- Summer Olympics:
  - Winner: 2008, 2012
  - Bronze Medalist: 2016, 2020
- World Championship:
  - Winner: 2011
  - Silver Medalist: 2007
  - Bronze Medalist: 2009
- European Championship:
  - Winner: 2006, 2008, 2010, 2016, 2020
  - Silver Medalist: 2012
- EHF Cup:
  - Finalist: 2019
- Norwegian Championship:
  - Winner: 2014/2015, 2015/2016
- Norwegian Cup:
  - Winner: 2007, 2014, 2015
  - Finalist: 2004, 2005, 2006, 2008, 2009
- Danish Championship
  - Winner: 2019, 2020
- Danish Cup
  - Winner: 2021

== Individual awards ==
- All-Star Team Best Line Player of the EHF Champions League: 2017
- 2020-21 Danish League all star team
