= Trine Nielsen =

Danish handball player (born 1980)

Personal information
- Full name: Trine Skovgaard Nielsen
- Nationality: Danish
- Born: 16 October 1980 (age 46) Aalborg, Denmark
- Height: 1.76 m (5 ft 9 in)

Sport
- Sport: Handball
- Position: Right back
- Current club: HC Odense (sports director)

Youth career
- Years: Team
- –: Hjortshøj Egå IF
- –: Brabrand IF

Senior clubs
- Years: Team
- 1998–2000: Brabrand IF
- 2000–2004: Ikast-Bording EH
- 2004–2005: Aalborg DH
- 2005–2009: GOG Svendborg TGI
- 2011–2013: HC Odense
National team
Years	Team	Apps	(Gls)
2001–2007	Denmark	54	(87)

Teams managed
- 2022–2025: HC Odense (sports director)
Medal record
Women's handball
Representing Denmark
Olympic Games
Gold medal – first place	2004 Athens	Team competition
European Championship
Gold medal – first place	2002 Denmark	Team competition

Trine Skovgaard Nielsen (née Jensen, born 16 October 1980) is a Danish former team handball player, Olympic champion and recently sports commentator for TV 2 Denmark. She won a gold medal with the Danish national team at the 2004 Summer Olympics in Athens.

Jensen has been sports commentator for the television channel TV 2 Denmark since 2011, covering handball events as expert. In 2020 she had to stop at TV2 Danmark, when her brother, Jesper Jensen was appointed as the Denmark women's national handball team head coach, and TV2 did not allow their journalists to interview their own family members.

She has also worked with sales- and sponsorships and as a part of the Graphical design department at the Danish handball club GOG Håndbold, her former club. Since 2022 she has worked as Sporting director for Odense Håndbold. After the 2024–25 season she will cease to be the sporting director at Odense, as the club will disband the position.

She is a sister of the former Danish handball player and acting handball coach, Jesper Jensen. Her mother played for the Danish club Vejlby-Risskov Idrætsklub and her father was a handball referee.

== Playing career ==
Trine Nielsen grev up in Hjortshøj, Denmark where she started playing at the local club Hjortshøj Egå IF, before moving to another Aarhus based club, Brabrand IF while playing for the U16 team. Here she started playing senior handball.

She moved to Ikast-Bording EH at the age of 20, where she played for 4 years. Here she won the Danish Women's Handball Cup in 2001, the EHF European League in 2002 and EHF Cup Winners' Cup in 2004.

She moved to Aalborg DH at the age of 23, but did not even play for 6 months before she was fired. The club believed she had breached the contract. Nielsen did not agree and took the club to court, where she won 500.000 DKK in compensation.

She quickly found a new club in GOG Svendborg TGI, where she under Jan Pytlick won the Danish Women's Handball Cup in 2005.
