= Lotte Grigel =

Danish handball player (born 1991)

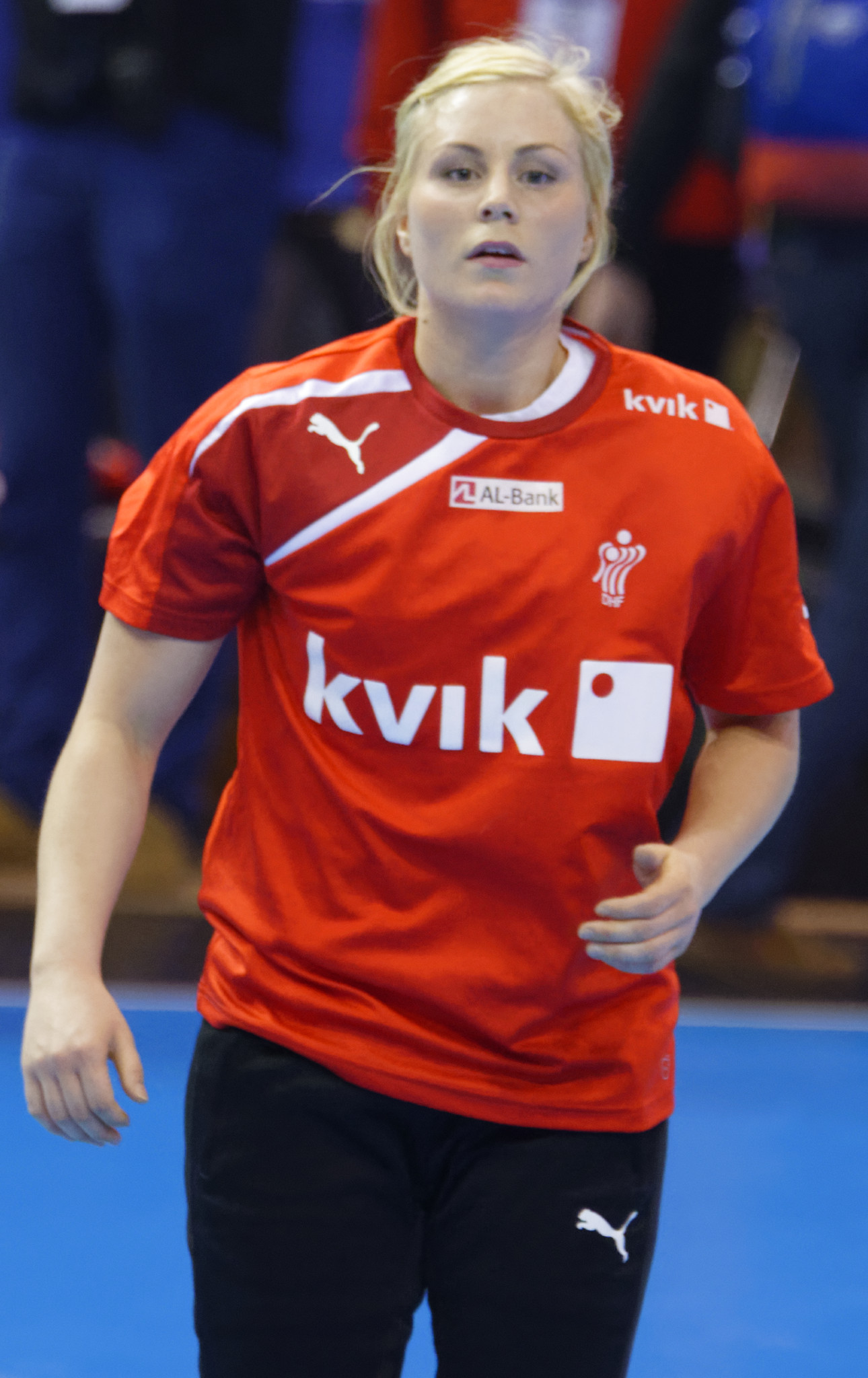
- Lotte Grigel

Personal information
- Full name: Lotte Grigel
- Nationality: Danish
- Born: 5 April 1991 (age 35) Esbjerg, Denmark
- Height: 1.65 m (5 ft 5 in)

Sport
- Sport: Handball
- Position: Centre back
- Current club: Nantes Atlantique Handball
- Number: 34

Youth career
- Years: Team
- 1997–2008: Team Esbjerg

Senior clubs
- Years: Team
- 2008–2015: Team Esbjerg
- 2015–2017: Rostov-Don (Russia)
- 2017–2019: Debreceni VSC (Hungary)
- 2019–2021: Nantes Atlantique Handball (France)
National team
Years	Team	Apps	(Gls)
2008–2021	Denmark	112	(163)
Medal record
IHF Youth World Championship
Bronze medal – third place	2008 Slovakia
- Updated on January 2024

Lotte Grigel (born 5 April 1991) is a Danish former handball player, who played for Team Esbjerg, Rostov-Don in Russia, Debreceni VSC in Hungary and Nantes Loire Atlantique Handball in France. She was also a stable on the Danish national team.

She made her debut on the Danish national team on 14 October 2008, against Russia.

== Career ==
She started playing handball at the age of 7 at the club KVIK Esbjerg. At the age of 16 in 2008 she made her debut for the local league side Team Esbjerg. She played 7 years for her childhood club, where she was considered a club icon.

The tenure ended in 2015 when there was a fall-out between her and the club's manager Lars Frederiksen. She believed she was overlooked and did not play enough, and multiple times announced, that she would not play under Frederiksen. The conflict ended in her signing for the Russian club Rostov-Don shortly before the 2015 World Women's Handball Championship. Here she won the 2017 EHF Cup.

After 15 months in Russia she switched to the Hungarian side Debreceni VSC, where she stayed for two years.

On 1 February 2019, it was announced that Lotte Grigel had signed a 2-year contract with Nantes Atlantique Handball. After this contract she announced the end of her career.

== Post-playing career ==
After her playing career she has been a handball expert on the Danish TV channel Viaplay since 2022, where she covers Danish women's handball.

== Achievements ==
=== Domestic ===
- Damehåndboldligaen:
  - Silver Medalist: 2015
- Danish Cup:
  - Finalist: 2011
- Danish Super Cup:
  - Winner: 2015
- Russian Super League:
  - Winner: 2017
  - Silver Medalist: 2016
- Russian Cup:
  - Winner: 2016, 2017

=== European ===
- Women's EHF Cup:
  - Winner: 2017
  - Silver Medalist: 2014
