= Maria Mose Vestergaard =

Danish handball player (born 1995)

Personal information
- Nationality: Danish
- Born: 21 May 1995 (age 31) Esbjerg, Denmark
- Height: 1.74 m (5 ft 9 in)

Sport
- Sport: Handball
- Position: Left wing
- Current club: HH Elite
- Number: 26

Youth career
- Years: Team
- –: KVIK
- –: UH Esbjerg
- 2012–2014: Team Esbjerg

Senior clubs
- Years: Team
- 2014–2019: Team Esbjerg
- 2019–2020: Holstebro Håndbold
- 2020–: HH Elite

Maria Mose Vestergaard (born 21 May 1995) is a Danish handball player for HH Elite.

She was part of the Team Esbjerg side that won the 2015-16 Damehåndboldligaen, the first national championship in club history.

== Achievements ==
- Danish League:
  - Winner: 2016, 2019
  - Silver Medalist: 2015
  - Bronze Medalist: 2017
- EHF Cup:
  - Finalist: 2014
