= Sanna Solberg-Isaksen =

Norwegian handball player (born 1990)

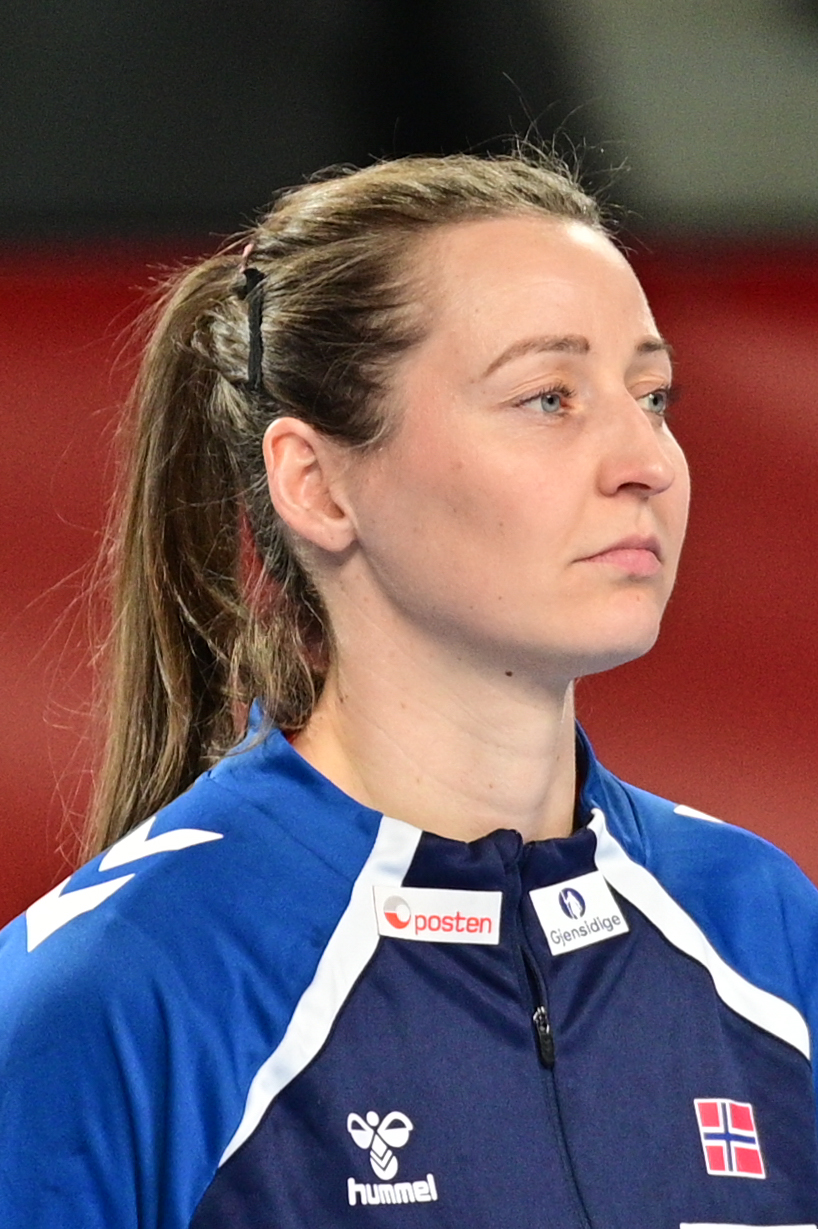
- Solberg-Isaksen in 2024

Personal information
- Full name: Sanna Charlotte Solberg-Isaksen
- Nationality: Norwegian
- Born: 16 June 1990 (age 36) Bærum, Norway
- Height: 1.78 m (5 ft 10 in)

Sport
- Sport: Handball
- Position: Left wing
- Current club: Team Esbjerg
- Number: 24

Youth career
- Years: Team
- –: Jar IL

Senior clubs
- Years: Team
- 2006–2007: Helset IF
- 2007–2014: Stabæk IF
- 2014–2017: Larvik HK
- 2017–: Team Esbjerg
National team
Years	Team	Apps	(Gls)
2010–	Norway	231	(452)
Medal record
Olympic Games
Gold medal – first place	2024 Paris	Team
Bronze medal – third place	2016 Rio de Janeiro	Team
Bronze medal – third place	2020 Tokyo	Team
World Championship
Gold medal – first place	2015 Denmark
Gold medal – first place	2021 Spain
Silver medal – second place	2017 Germany
Silver medal – second place	2023 Denmark/Norway/Sweden
European Championship
Gold medal – first place	2014 Croatia/Hungary
Gold medal – first place	2016 Sweden
Gold medal – first place	2020 Denmark
Gold medal – first place	2024 Austria/Hungary/Switzerland
Junior World Championship
Gold medal – first place	2010 South Korea
Junior European Championship
Gold medal – first place	2009 Hungary

Sanna Charlotte Solberg-Isaksen (born 16 June 1990) is a Norwegian handball player for Team Esbjerg and the Norwegian national team.

She is a twin sister of Silje Solberg-Østhassel and is half Swedish through her mother.

== Career ==
Solberg-Isaksen started playing handball at Helset IF, and later signed for Stabæk IF in the highest Norwegian league, where she played with her sister, Silje Solberg. In 2011, she reached the final of the Norwegian cup with the club, where they lost to Larvik HK.

In 2014, she signed for Larvik HK. Here she won the Norwegian championship in 2015, 2016 and 2017.

In 2017, she joined Danish side Team Esbjerg. Here she won the Danish league in 2019, 2020, and 2024, and the Danish cup in 2021.

In July 2022, she announced her first pregnancy. In October 2025, she announced her second pregnancy.

== National team ==
She made her debut on the Norwegian national team in 2010 in a match against Romania. The same year she played at the 2013 World Championship. A year later she won gold medals at the 2014 European Championship. At the 2015 World Championship she won bronze medals.

She also represented Norway at the 2016 Olympics where she won another bronze medal. Later the same year she won her second European title at the 2016 European Championship.

A year later she won silver medals at the 2017 World Women's Handball Championship.

At the 2020 European Women's Handball Championship she won her third European title. A year later she won bronze medals at the 2020 Olympics. Solberg scored 21 goals during the tournament. Later the same year she won her second World Championship title at the 2021 World Championship.

Two years later she won a silver medal at the 2023 World Championship. She scored 14 goals during the tournament.

At the 2024 Olympics she won her first Olympic gold medal. Later the same year she won yet another European title at the 2024 European Championship.

== Achievements ==
- Olympic Games:
  - Winner: 2024
  - Bronze Medalist: 2016, 2020
- World Championship:
  - Winner: 2015, 2021
  - Silver Medalist: 2017, 2023
- European Championship:
  - Winner: 2014, 2016, 2020, 2024
- Junior World Championship:
  - Winner: 2010
- Junior European Championship:
  - Winner: 2009
- EHF Champions League:
  - Silver medalist: 2014/2015
  - Bronze medalist: 2023/2024, 2024/2025
- EHF Cup:
  - Finalist: 2019
- Norwegian Championship:
  - Winner: 2014/2015, 2015/2016
- Norwegian Cup:
  - Winner: 2014, 2015
  - Finalist: 2011, 2012
- Danish League:
  - Gold Medalist: 2019, 2020, 2023, 2024, 2026
  - Silver Medalist: 2025
- Danish Cup:
  - Winner: 2017, 2021, 2022, 2023, 2024
  - Bronze Medalist: 2018

== Individual awards ==
- All-Star Left Wing of the Junior World Championship: 2010
- All-Star Left Wing of Damehåndboldligaen: 2017/2018
- All-Star Left Wing of EHF Champions League: 2020, 2022

== Personal life ==
She is married. She and her husband Kjetil, have two daughters: Mathea, born January 2023, and Linnea, born May 2026.
