= 2019–20 Damehåndboldligaen =

Damehåndboldligaen
- Season: 2019–20
- Champion: Team Esbjerg
- Relegated: EH Aalborg
- Champions League: Team Esbjerg
- EHF European League: Odense Håndbold; Viborg HK; Herning-Ikast Håndbold
- Matches played: 147
- Goals scored: 7,508 (51.07 per match)
- Top goalscorer: (Denmark) Mia Rej (170 goals)
- Biggest home win: 15 goals: OHC 37–22 TTH (25 Oct)
- Biggest away win: 15 goals: HHE 22–37 OHC (16 Oct); VHK 24–39 ESB (16 Oct)
- Highest scoring: 67 goals: ESB 37–30 KBH (2 Oct)
- All statistics correct as of 23 February 2020.

The 2019–20 Damehåndboldligaen (known as HTH Ligaen for sponsorship reasons) was the 84th season of Damehåndboldligaen, Denmark's premier handball league. Team Esbjerg were the defending champions and HH Elite were promoted from the 1. division.

The season was disrupted due to the COVID-19 pandemic. On March 11, 2020, the Danish Handball Federation decided to cancel all matches at all levels the following 14 days. On April 7 it was decided that the season would be declared over without playing the championship play-off or the remaining matches in the regular season and declare the leading team the champion.

Team Esbjerg won the title, as they were leading the table at the time. EH Aalborg were relegated, as they were last in table at the time of cancellation. EH Aalborg protested the decision, proposing instead that there should be no relegated teams and that the 2020-21 season should have 15 teams instead. Their proposal was ultimately rejected.

== Team information ==
Locations of the 2019–20 Damehåndboldligaen

Team.	Town	Arena	Capacity
Aarhus United	Aarhus	Ceres Arena Stadionhal	1.200
Ajax København	København	Bavnehøj-Hallen	1.000
EH Aalborg	Aalborg	Nørresundby Idrætscenter	800
Herning-Ikast Håndbold	Ikast	IBF Arena	2.850
HH Elite	Horsens	Forum Horsens	4.000
København Håndbold	København	Frederiksberghallen	1.468
Nykøbing Falster Håndboldklub	Nykøbing Falster; Næstved	LÅNLET Arena; Næstved Arena	1.300; 2,500
Odense Håndbold	Odense	Odense Idrætshal	2.256
Randers HK	Randers	Arena Randers	3.000
Silkeborg-Voel KFUM	Silkeborg	Jysk Arena	3.000
Skanderborg Håndbold	Skanderborg	Skanderborg Fælled	1.700
Team Esbjerg	Esbjerg	Blue Water Dokken	2.549
Team Tvis Holstebro	Holstebro	Gråkjær Arena	3.250
Viborg HK	Viborg	Vibocold Arena Viborg	3.000

=== Head coaches ===
Team	Head coach
København Håndbold	(Denmark) Claus Mogensen
Silkeborg-Voel KFUM	(Denmark) Jakob Andreasen
Odense Håndbold	(Denmark) Karen Brødsgaard
Team Esbjerg	(Denmark) Jesper Jensen
EH Aalborg	(Denmark) Morten Holmen
TTH Holstebro	(Sweden) Pether Krautmeyer
Nykøbing Falster HK	(Greenland) Jakob Larsen
Ajax København	(Denmark) Dennis Bo Jensen
Viborg HK	(Denmark) Jakob Vestergaard
Aarhus United	(Denmark) Heine Eriksen
Herning-Ikast Håndbold	(Denmark) Mathias Madsen
Randers HK	(Denmark) Niels Agesen
Skanderborg Håndbold	(Denmark) Jeppe Vestergaard
HH Elite	(Denmark) Lars Frederiksen

== Regular season ==
=== Standings ===
Pos	Team	Pld	W	D	L	GF	GA	GD	Pts	Qualification or relegation
1	Team Esbjerg	23	19	2	2	666	533	+133	40	Champion + advance to Champions League
2	Odense Håndbold	23	18	0	5	672	545	+127	36	Qualification for EHF Cup
3	Viborg HK	23	17	1	5	633	531	+102	35	Qualification for EHF Cup
4	København Håndbold	24	17	1	6	695	627	+68	35	
5	Silkeborg-Voel KFUM	24	14	2	8	652	619	+33	30	
6	Herning-Ikast Håndbold	23	14	2	7	621	546	+75	30	Qualification for EHF Cup (via. the Danish Cup)
7	Aarhus United	23	12	2	9	564	555	+9	26	
8	Randers HK	23	10	3	10	587	589	−2	23	
9	Nykøbing Falster Håndbold	23	10	2	11	581	585	−4	22	
10	Ajax København	23	6	1	16	517	604	−87	13	
11	TTH Holstebro	23	5	2	16	528	637	−109	12	
12	HH Elite	23	4	0	19	521	647	−126	8	
13	Skanderborg Håndbold	23	3	1	19	504	599	−95	7	
14	EH Aalborg	23	3	1	19	549	673	−124	7	Relegated

Rules for classification: 1.) Points in head-to-head matches amongst tied teams; 2.) Goal difference in head-to-head matches amongst tied teams; 3.) Goals scored in head-to-head matches among tied teams; 4.) Points in all matches; 5.) Goal difference in all matches.

=== Results ===
In the table below the home teams are listed on the left and the away teams along the top. Last updated on 10 March 2020.

Home \ Away	AAR	AJA	EHA	HIH	HHE	KBH	NFH	OHC	RHK	SIL	SKA	ESB	TTH	VHK
Aarhus United		28–15	29–25	26–23	24–23	22–30	x	17–26	16–17	27–29	22–17	23–23	28–23	25–23
Ajax København	23–25		21–24	21–21	x	26–28	18–29	21–33	27–30	28–25	28–23	18–26	26–24	x
EH Aalborg	23–28	28–23		29–35	22–17	24–32	28–31	x	x	27–33	25–29	20–29	22–27	17–36
Herning-Ikast Håndbold	23–19	30–16	33–27		26–21	22–28	26–19	26–30	x	29–28	26–16	x	35–20	24–26
HH Elite	26–34	18–24	30–24	23–32		19–28	21–31	22–37	26–27	27–33	25–21	26–24	x	25–29
København Håndbold	22–24	29–20	35–23	23–30	38–25		31–30	31–29	28–26	29–22	x	30–30	27–24	24–32
Nykøbing Falster Håndbold	25–24	22–18	x	24–22	32–20	28–26		22–30	29–29	25–26	26–26	19–31	x	21–26
Odense Håndbold	x	27–28	35–26	24–26	23–17	x	29–23		27–23	30–28	31–26	25–28	37–22	21–25
Randers HK	29–29	x	34–23	25–25	x	22–30	32–27	25–34		23–24	27–25	23–30	28–22	20–23
Silkeborg-Voel	29–25	26–24	29–28	35–26	20–22	26–28	28–23	20–30	29–25		22–17	26–30	26–26	x
Skanderborg Håndbold	23–27	25–19	x	16–27	22–21	27–28	20–25	19–30	21–23	28–31		x	20–22	13–26
Team Esbjerg	29–22	33–23	28–18	26–24	27–21	37–30	27–21	25–27	25–19	x	30–26		37–27	29–22
TTH Holstebro	x	27–26	24–24	24–30	30–25	26–30	24–28	22–26	17–23	15–30	26–23	19–23		18–35
Viborg HK	29–20	23–24	28–16	x	30–25	33–30	23–21	23–31	30–21	27–27	32–21	24–39	28–19	

Legend: Blue = home team win; Yellow = draw; Red = away team win.

== Top goalscorers ==
As of last matches played before the season got cancelled due to COVID-19

=== Regular season ===
Rank	Player	Club	Goals
1	(Denmark) Mia Rej	København Håndbold	170
2	(Sweden) Melissa Petrén	HH Elite	140
3	(Denmark) Kristina Jørgensen	Viborg HK	123
4	(Netherlands) Dione Housheer	Nykøbing Falster HK	122
5	(Sweden) Linn Blohm	København Håndbold	117
6	(Denmark) Sofia Deen	Skanderborg Håndbold	113
7	(Denmark) Mai Kragballe Nielsen	Randers HK	110
8	(Denmark) Celine Lundbye Kristiansen	Aarhus United	108
9	(Denmark) Jane Schumacher	Silkeborg-Voel KFUM	108
10	(Denmark) Helene Kindberg	Silkeborg-Voel KFUM	103

=== Monthly awards ===
Month	Player of the Month	
Month	Player	Club
September	(Denmark) Mia Rej	København Håndbold
October	(Norway) Jeanett Kristiansen	Herning-Ikast Håndbold
January	(Denmark) Mia Rej	København Håndbold
February	(Denmark) Anna Kristensen	Viborg HK

=== All-star Team ===
The team of the year was announced on April 30, after it had been decided to cut the league short.

Position	Name	Club
Goalkeeper	(Denmark) Anna Kristensen	Viborg HK
Right wing	(Norway) Marit Røsberg Jacobsen	Team Esbjerg
Right back	(Denmark) Helene Kindberg	Silkeborg-Voel KFUM
Centre back	(Denmark) Mia Rej	København Håndbold
Left back	(Denmark) Kristina Jørgensen	Viborg HK
Left wing	(Norway) June Bøttger	Aarhus United
Pivot	(Sweden) Linn Blohm	København Håndbold
MVP	(Denmark) Mia Rej	København Håndbold

=== Coach of the season ===
(Denmark) Jesper Jensen - Team Esbjerg
