= Tomas Axnér =

Swedish handball coach (born 1969)

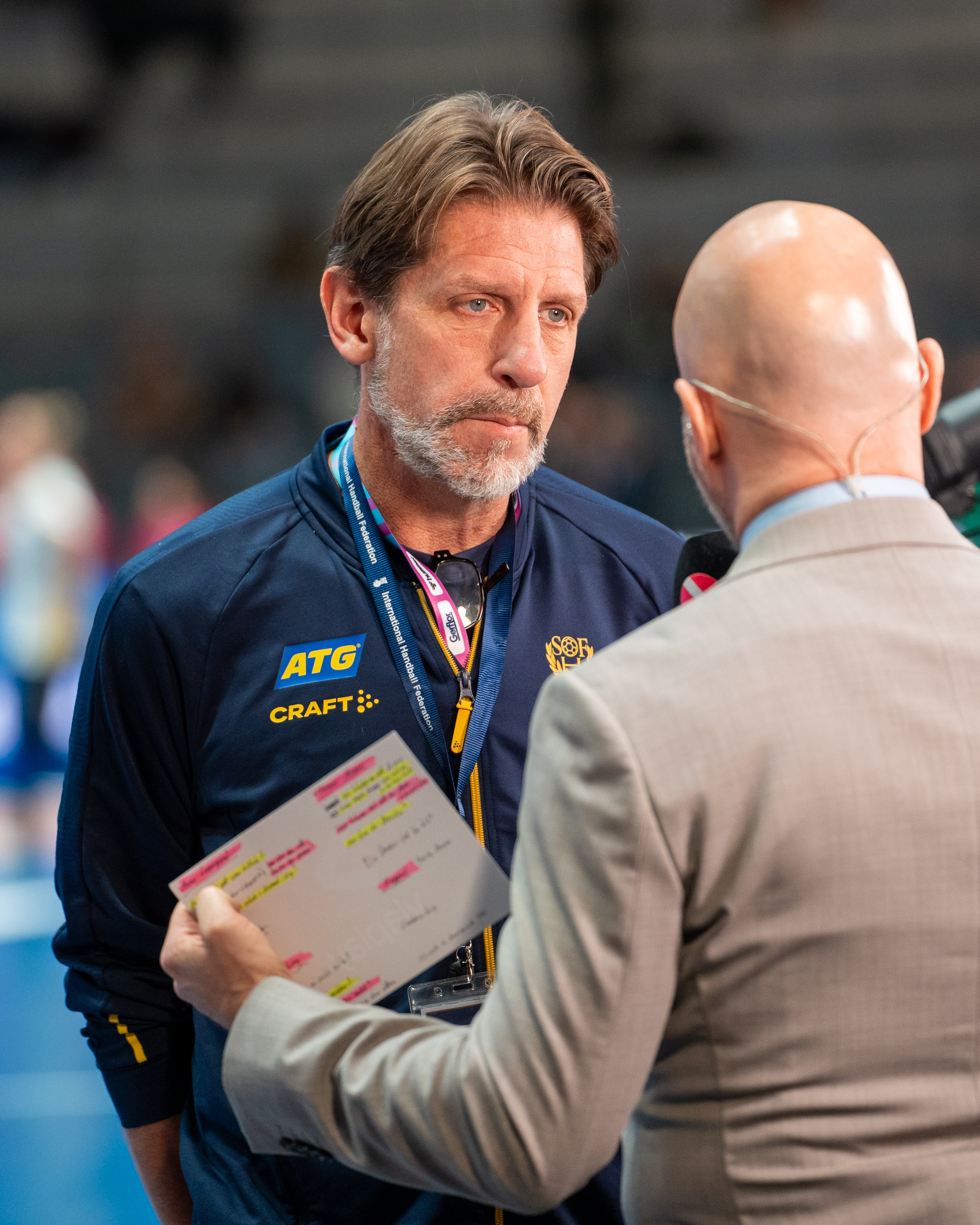

Personal information
- Nationality: Swedish
- Born: 30 November 1969 (age 56) Spånga, Sweden
- Height: 1.84 m (6 ft 0 in)

Sport
- Sport: Handball
- Position: Right wing
- Current club: Sweden women's team (manager); Team Esbjerg (head coach)

Senior clubs
- Years: Team
- –: Lödde HK
- –: IK Wargo
- –: Pölsemannen
- 1992-1995: H43 Lund
- 1995-1998: Lugi HF
- 1998–2000: VfL Gummersbach
- 2000–2005: GWD Minden
- 2005–2010: H43 Lund
- 2005–2010: Trelleborg HBK

Teams managed
- 2010–2012: Lugi HF assistant
- 2012–2014: Lugi HF
- 2015–2020: Lugi HF
- 2020–: Sweden
- 2024–2027: Team Esbjerg

Ulf Tomas Axnér (born 30 November 1969) is a Swedish former handball player and current head coach of the Danish club Team Esbjerg as well as of the Sweden women's national team. Between 2012 and 2020 he coached Lugi HF, except for a one-year break.

== Playing career ==
Tomas Axnér started his handball career at Lödde HK, where he debuted as a senior player before joining IK Wargo and then Pölsemannen, a club that at the time played in the Swedish Division 2. In 1992 he joined H43 Lund in the top Swedish league, where he played for three and a half years. He then joined league rivals Lugi HF midway through the season in 1995/96. Lugi wanted to sign Axnér already in the fall of 1995, but the clubs could not agree on the exact transfer fee, so he only joined halfway through the season. In 1996 he reached the final of the Swedish cup, but lost to Redbergslids IK.

He then moved to Germany in the Handball-Bundesliga, where he played for VfL Gummersbach and GWD Minden.

After five years at Minden he returned to Sweden and his former club H43 Lund. Here he acted as the player-assistant coach to Ola Månsson

In 2012, when he had already become a coach, he made a short return to the court to join Allsvenskan team Trelleborg HBK during the 2012 European Championship break.

Other than Stefan Lövgren he is the only player to have 1000 goals in both the Swedish league and the German Bundesliga.

== Coaching career ==
In 2010, after his playing days had just ended, he became the assistant coach of Lugi HF. In 2012 he became the head coach of the men's team at Lugi. After the 2013/14 season he took a year break, and returned in 2015. He then stayed until 2020, when he became the head coach of the Sweden, replacing Henrik Signell.

At the U18 Women's World Championship in 2022 the Swedish coach was suspended, and therefore Axnér took over the team for a single tournament.

He coached Sweden at the 2020 European Women's Handball Championship, where the team ended in 11th.

At the 2024 Olympics he led the team to a 4th place.

In March 2024 he extended his contract with the Swedish national team until 2026.

In the summer of 2024 he became the coach of Danish women's team Team Esbjerg, replacing Jesper Jensen, while still continuing as the Swedish head coach. The Esbjerg players were involved in choosing their coach, and the club prioritized getting someone to sign on a long-term commitment and someone who had playing experience at the top level. In the 2025-26 season he guided the team to the Danish Championship. In October 2026, Team Esbjerg announced that after the 2026-27 season, Axner would be replaced by Jesper Jensen, who he had himself replaced three years earlier.

== Private life ==
His daughter Tyra Axnér is also a handball player, whom he has coached on the Swedish national team.

He is trained as a teacher, but has never worked as such.
