= Rikke Zachariassen =

Danish handball player (born 1984)

Rikke Zachriassen
Personal information
- Full name: Rikke Riber Zachariassen
- Nationality: Danish
- Born: 1 July 1984 (age 42) Haderslev, Denmark
- Height: 1.87 m (6 ft 2 in)

Sport
- Sport: Handball
- Position: Line Player

Senior clubs
- Years: Team
- 2003-2004: Gudme HK
- 2004-2005: KIF Kolding
- 2005-2018: Team Esbjerg

Rikke Riber Zachariassen (born 1 July 1984) is a Danish former handball who has played for Team Esbjerg since 2005, but stopped her career in 2018.

She was part of the Team Esbjerg side that won the 2015-16 Damehåndboldligaen, the first national championship in club history.
