= Johanna Ahlm =

Swedish handball player (born 1987)

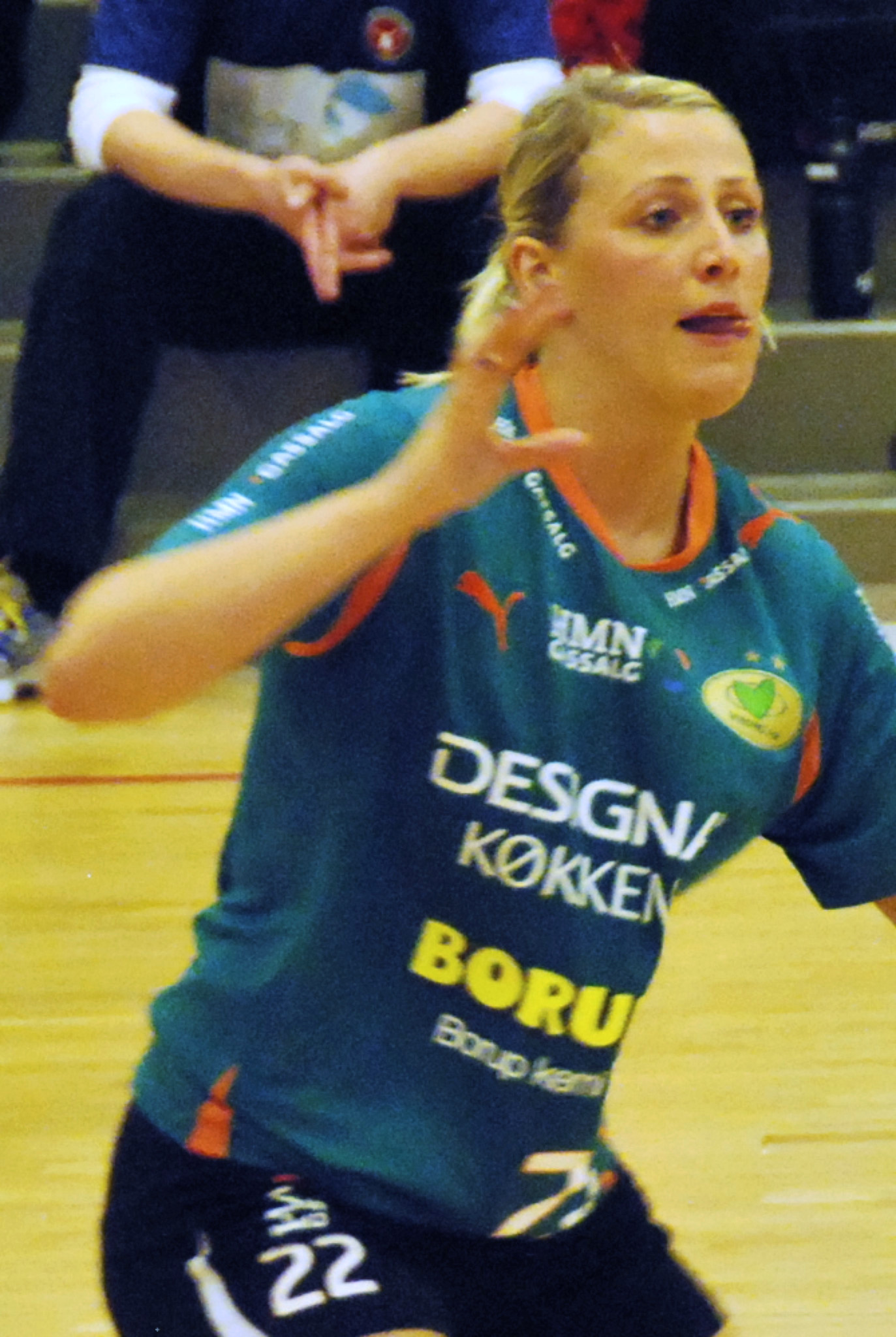
- Johanna Ahlm in 2011

Personal information
- Full name: Johanna Marie Helene Ahlm
- Nationality: Swedish
- Born: 3 October 1987 (age 39) Gothenburg, Sweden
- Height: 1.75 m (5 ft 9 in)

Sport
- Sport: Handball
- Position: Centre back / Left back

Senior clubs
- Years: Team
- 2004-2009: IK Sävehof
- 2009: Aalborg DH
- 2009-2013: Viborg HK
- 2013-2015: Team Esbjerg
- 2015-2016: FC Midtjylland Håndbold
- 2016-2019: IK Sävehof
National team
Years	Team	Apps	(Gls)
2005-2015	Sweden	141	(460)
Medal record
European Championship
Bronze medal – third place	2014 Croatia/Hungary

Johanna Maria Helène Ahlm (born 3 October 1987) is a Swedish former handball player. She started and ended her career at the Swedish club IK Sävehof, but other than those tenures she played her entire career in the Danish handball league. She also played for the Sweden women's national handball team. She competed at the 2008 Summer Olympics in Beijing, where Sweden placed 8th, and the 2012 Summer Olympics, where Sweden placed 11th. Ahlm was listed among the top ten goalscorers at the 2008 Olympics tournament with 40 goals.

== Career ==
=== Club career ===
Alhm started as a youth player for IK Sävehof, where she was coached by both her mother and her father. Her first major success was at the youth tournament Partille Cup in 2005. With IK Sävehof she won three Swedish championships, before moving to Denmark. In her last season with Sävehof, she was the Swedish league top scorer with 167 goals. She moved to Aalborg DH, but was immediately loaned to Viborg HK. The season after she signed permanently for Viborg HK, where she played for three years. At Viborg HK she was hampered by injuries, but nevertheless managed to win the Champions League and Danish league double in 2010.

After three years she signed for Team Esbjerg, where she once again one the Danish league in 2014. Same year she reached the final of the EHF Cup, where Team Esbjerg lost to Russian side Handball Club Lada.

Before the 2015-2016 season she signed for FC Midtjylland Håndbold, before returning to her childhood club, IK Sävehof, in 2016. She was however kept away from the pitch for an entire season, first by a cruciate ligament injury, and later by pregnancy. She returned to handball in November 2017. The same season, she won her fourth Swedish Championship. After winning her fifth Swedish Championship the year after, she retired from handball.

=== National team career ===
She debuted for the national team in 2005 at the age of 18 against Denmark. She was at her first major international tournament at the 2006 European Women's Handball Championship, but did not see much playing time.

Her real breakthrough came in 2008 at the Olympics. She and Sweden finished 4th, losing to eventual winners Norway in the semifinal. She missed the 2010 European Women's Handball Championship due to injury.

At the 2014 European Women's Handball Championship she won bronze medals, losing to Norway in the semifinal and beating Montenegro in the third place playoff.

== Achievements ==
- Carpathian Trophy:
  - Winner: 2015
- Swedish League
  - Winner: 2006, 2007, 2009, 2018, and 2019 with IK Sävehof
- Danish League
  - Winner: 2010 with Viborg HK, 2014 with Team Esbjerg
- Champions League
  - Winner: 2010 with Viborg HK
