= Helene Kindberg =

Danish handball player (born 1998)

Personal information
- Full name: Helene Kindberg Hansen
- Nationality: Danish
- Born: 13 January 1998 (age 28) Stockholm, Sweden
- Height: 1.79 m (5 ft 10 in)

Sport
- Sport: Handball
- Position: Right back
- Current club: København Håndbold
- Number: 2

Youth career
- Years: Team
- 2015–2017: FC Midtjylland Håndbold

Senior clubs
- Years: Team
- 2017–2018: FC Midtjylland Håndbold
- 2017–2023: Silkeborg-Voel KFUM
- 2023–2025: København Håndbold
- 2025–: Team Esbjerg
National team
Years	Team	Apps	(Gls)
2020–	Denmark	26	(41)
Medal record
European Championship
Silver medal – second place	2024 Austria/Hungary/Switzerland
- Updated on 27 August 2026

Helene Kindberg (born 13 January 1998) is a Danish handball player who plays for Danish team Team Esbjerg and the Danish national team.

She was elected as the Best Right back in the Danish Women's Handball League in 2019/20.

== Career ==
Kindberg started her senior career at FC Midtjylland in 2017, where she was the back-up to Louise Burgaard. After one season she transferred to local rivals Silkeborg-Voel KFUM, where she once again was a rotational player, this time sharing playing time with the German Susann Müller. After she left the club, Kindberg became the first choice and since became one of the best players for the club.

In 2020 she was selected for the Danish national team, but less than a month later she was sidelined with a cruciate ligament injury for more than a year. She wasn't in national team contention before 2024, where she debuted in a friendly match against Japan.

In 2023 she signed for København Håndbold on a two-year contract.

In 2024 she played at her first major international tournament at the 2024 European Championship, where she acted mainly as a backup. Here Denmark came second. At the 2025 World Women's Handball Championship Denmark went out in the quarterfinal to France after winning all matches in the group stages. The Danish team was affected by a lot of players missing the tournament including goalkeepers Sandra Toft and Althea Reinhardt and pivots Sarah Iversen and Rikke Iversen. This was the first time since 2019 that Denmark left a major international tournament without any medals.

== Titles ==
- Danish Championship:
  - Winner: 2026

== Individual awards ==
- Best Right back of Damehåndboldligaen: 2019/20
