= Elin Hansson =

Swedish handball player (born 1996)

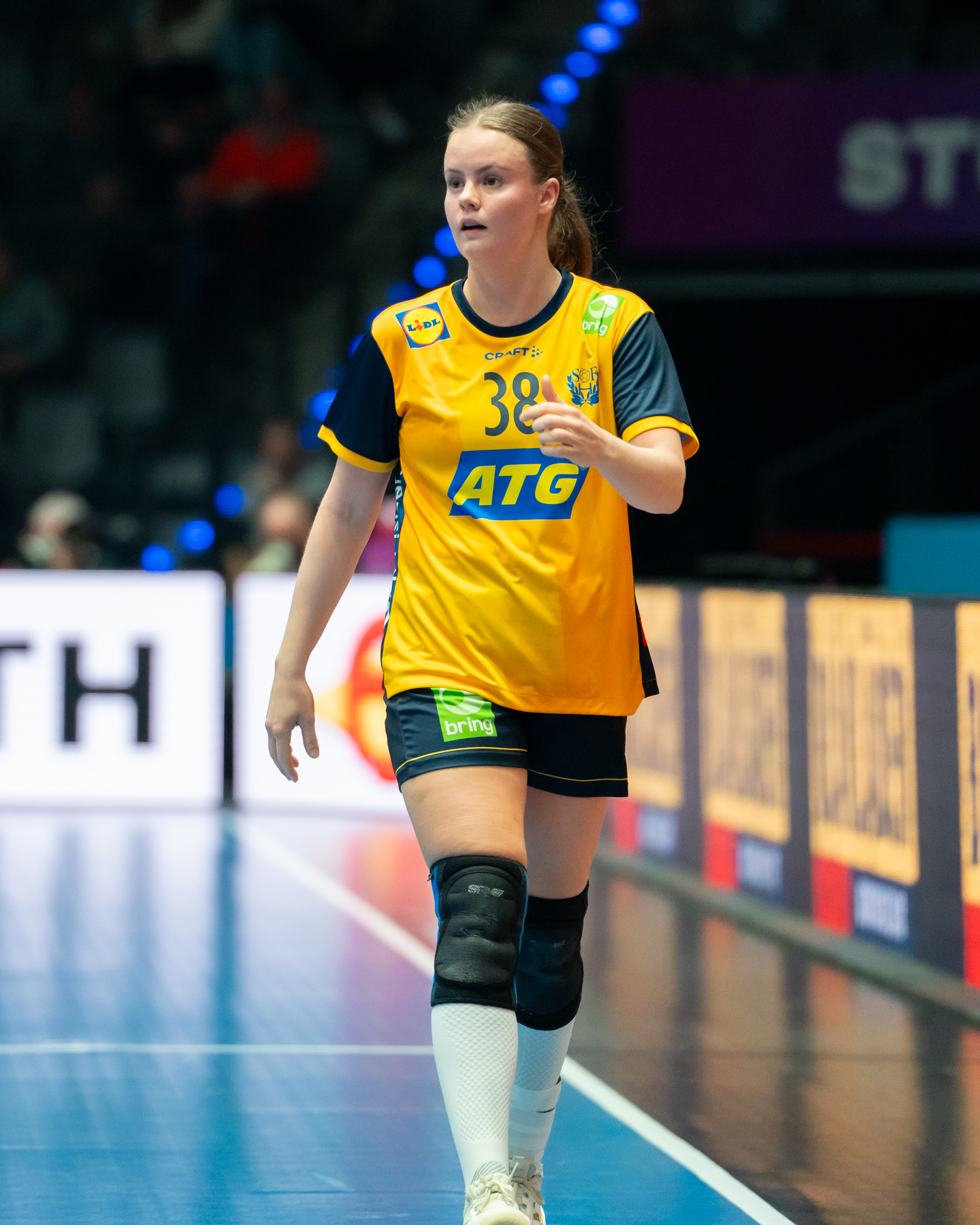

Personal information
- Nationality: Swedish
- Born: 7 August 1996 (age 30) Nacka, Sweden
- Height: 1.73 m (5 ft 8 in)

Sport
- Sport: Handball
- Position: Left wing
- Current club: Team Esbjerg
- Number: 17

Senior clubs
- Years: Team
- 2015–2022: Skuru IK
- 2022–2023: SCM Râmnicu Vâlcea
- 2023–2024: HH Elite
- 2024–: Team Esbjerg
National team
Years	Team	Apps	(Gls)
2018–	Sweden	95	(235)

Elin Hansson (born 7 August 1996) is a Swedish handballer for Team Esbjerg and the Swedish national team.

She represented Sweden at the 2020 European Women's Handball Championship.

== Achievements ==
- Swedish Handball League:
  - Gold Medalist: 2021
- Swedish Handball Cup:
  - Gold Medalist: 2022
- EHF Champions League
  - Bronze Medalist: 2024-25
- Danish Handball League
  - Winner: 2026
  - Silver Medalist: 2025
