= Katharina Filter =

German handball player (born 1999)

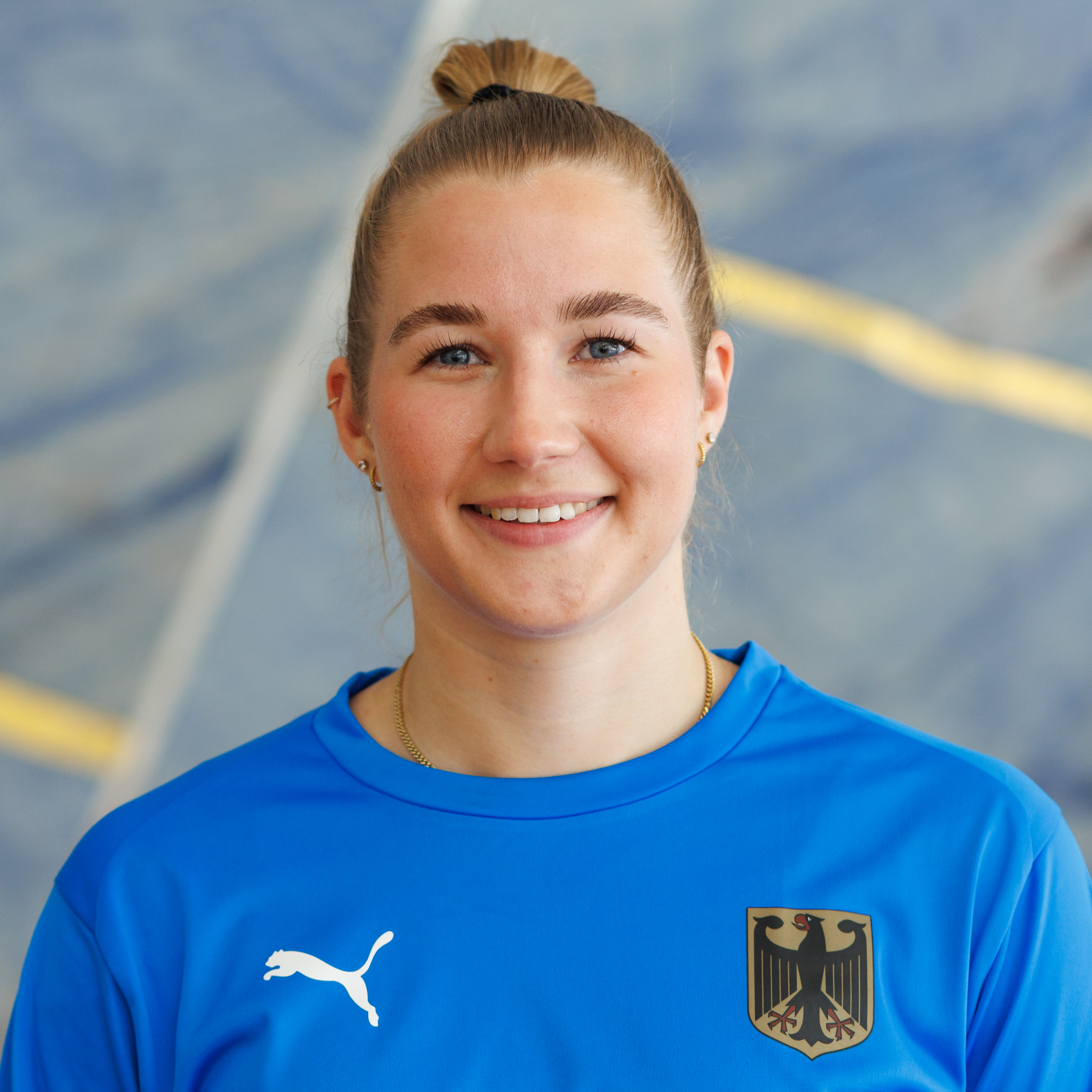
- Filter in 2024

Personal information
- Nationality: German
- Born: 4 February 1999 (age 27) Hamburg, Germany
- Height: 1.81 m (5 ft 11 in)

Sport
- Sport: Handball
- Position: Goalkeeper
- Current club: Team Esbjerg
- Number: 24

Senior clubs
- Years: Team
- 2017–2018: Buxtehuder SV
- 2018–2019: HL Buchholz 08-Rosengarten
- 2019–2022: Buxtehuder SV
- 2022–2023: København Håndbold
- 2023–2025: Brest Bretagne Handball
- 2025–: Team Esbjerg
National team
Years	Team	Apps	(Gls)
2021–	Germany	74	(2)
Medal record
World Championship
Silver medal – second place	2025 Netherlands/Germany
Beach Handball World Championships
Gold medal – first place	2022 Greece
- Updated on 19 November 2025

Katharina Filter (born 4 February 1999) is a German female handball player for Team Esbjerg and the German national team.

Filter also plays Beach Handball, and won the German Beach Handball championship with her club Beach Unicorns Hannover.

== National team ==
She represented Germany at the 2021 World Women's Handball Championship in Spain and the 2025 World Women's Handball Championship at home. Here Germany reached the final, where they lost to Norway. This was the first time since 1994 that Germany made the final of a major international tournament and the first time they won a medal since 2007.

== Club career ==
In May 2026 she was injured and thus missed the semifinals and finals of the 2025-26 season. As the other Esbjerg keeper Anna Kristensen was also injured, Esbjerg brought Silje Solberg-Østhassel in as a replacement. Despite the injury problems, Esbjerg would go on to win the Danish Championship, beating Odense Håndbold in the final.
