= Vilde Ingstad =

Norwegian handball player (born 1994)

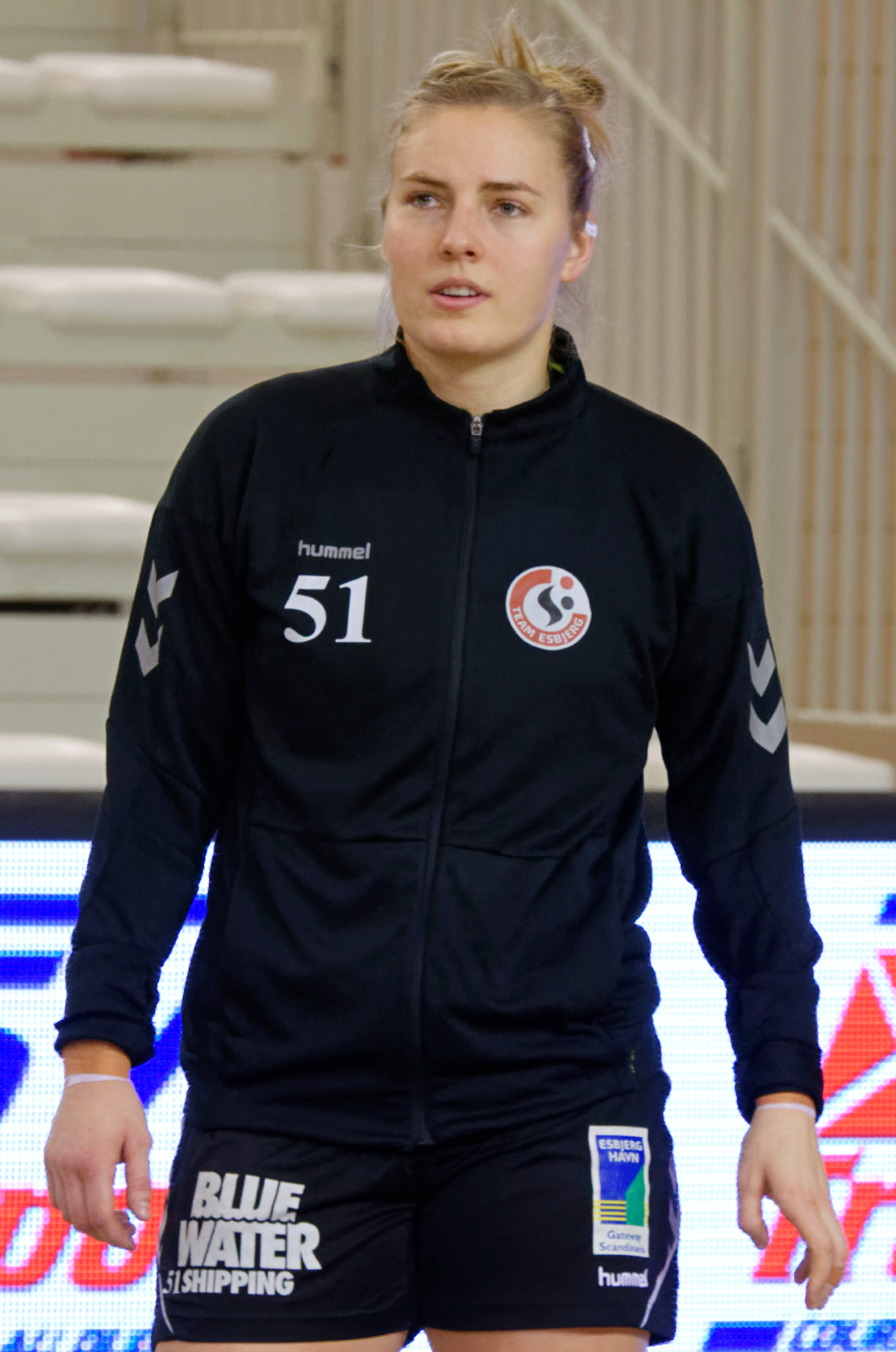
- Ingstad in 2018

Personal information
- Full name: Vilde Mortensen Ingstad
- Nationality: Norwegian
- Born: 18 December 1994 (age 31) Oslo, Norway
- Height: 1.78 m (5 ft 10 in)

Sport
- Sport: Handball
- Position: Pivot
- Current club: Ferencvárosi TC
- Number: 51

Youth career
- Years: Team
- 2002–2010: Nordstrand IF

Senior clubs
- Years: Team
- 2010–2014: Nordstrand IF
- 2014–2016: Oppsal
- 2016–2023: Team Esbjerg
- 2023–2025: CSM București
- 2025–: Ferencvárosi TC
National team
Years	Team	Apps	(Gls)
2014–	Norway	151	(238)
Medal record
Olympic Games
Gold medal – first place	2024 Paris	Team
World Championship
Gold medal – first place	2015 Denmark
Gold medal – first place	2021 Spain
Gold medal – first place	2025 Germany/Netherlands
Silver medal – second place	2017 Germany
Silver medal – second place	2023 Denmark/Norway/Sweden
European Championship
Gold medal – first place	2016 Sweden
Gold medal – first place	2022 Slovenia/North Macedonia/Montenegro
Youth World Championship
Bronze medal – third place	2012 Montenegro

Vilde Mortensen Ingstad (born 18 December 1994) is a Norwegian handball player for Ferencvárosi TC and the Norwegian national team.

== Career ==
Ingstad started playing handball in 2002 at Nordstrand IF, where she made her senior debut in 2010. In 2014 she joined Oppsal IF. In 2016 she joined Danish side Team Esbjerg. Here she won the 2019, 2020 and 2023 Danish Championships and the 2017, 2021 and 2022 Danish Cup. In 2017 she extended her contract at the club until 2020.In 2018 she was named player of the year in Denmark.

In 2023 she joined Romanian top club CSM București. Here she won the 2024 Romanian championship and cup.

She then signed a deal to join Hungarian Ferencvárosi TC for the 2025-26 season.

== National team ==
Ingstad played 26 games for the Norwegian U19 team and 34 games for the U20 teams.

She also represented Norway in the 2013 Women's Junior European Handball Championship, placing 4th, and in the 2014 Women's Junior World Handball Championship, placing 9th.

=== Senior national team ===
She made her debut on the Norwegian national team in 2014.

With the Norwegian team she won the 2015 World Championship, which was her first major international tournament. A year later she won gold medals at the 2016 European Championship. At the 2017 World Championship she won silver medals, losing to France in the final.

At the 2021 World Championship she won her second World Championship. Two years later she won silver medals at the 2023 World Championship, once again losing to France in the final. At the 2022 European Championship she won her second European Championship.

At the 2024 Olympics she won gold medals with the Norwegian team. In the preliminary round she had a cruciate ligament tear, which meant she couldn't play the rest of the tournament.

At the 2025 World Championship she was part of the Norwegian team that won World Cup gold medals.

== Personal life ==
Ingstad is born to a Norwegian mother and Danish father.

== Achievements ==
- European Championship:
  - Winner: 2016, 2022
- World Championship:
  - Winner: 2015, 2021, 2025
  - Silver Medalist: 2017
- World Youth Championship:
  - Bronze Medalist: 2012
- EHF Cup:
  - Finalist: 2019
- Danish League:
  - Gold Medalist: 2019, 2020, 2023
- Danish Cup:
  - Winner: 2017, 2021, 2022
  - Bronze Medalist: 2018

== Individual awards ==
- All-Star Line Player of Grundigligaen: 2014/2015
- All-Star Line Player of Damehåndboldligaen: 2018/2019
- Best Player of Damehåndboldligaen: 2018/2019
- EHF Excellence Awards Best Line Player of 2022/23
