= Silje Solberg-Østhassel =

Norwegian handball player (born 1990)

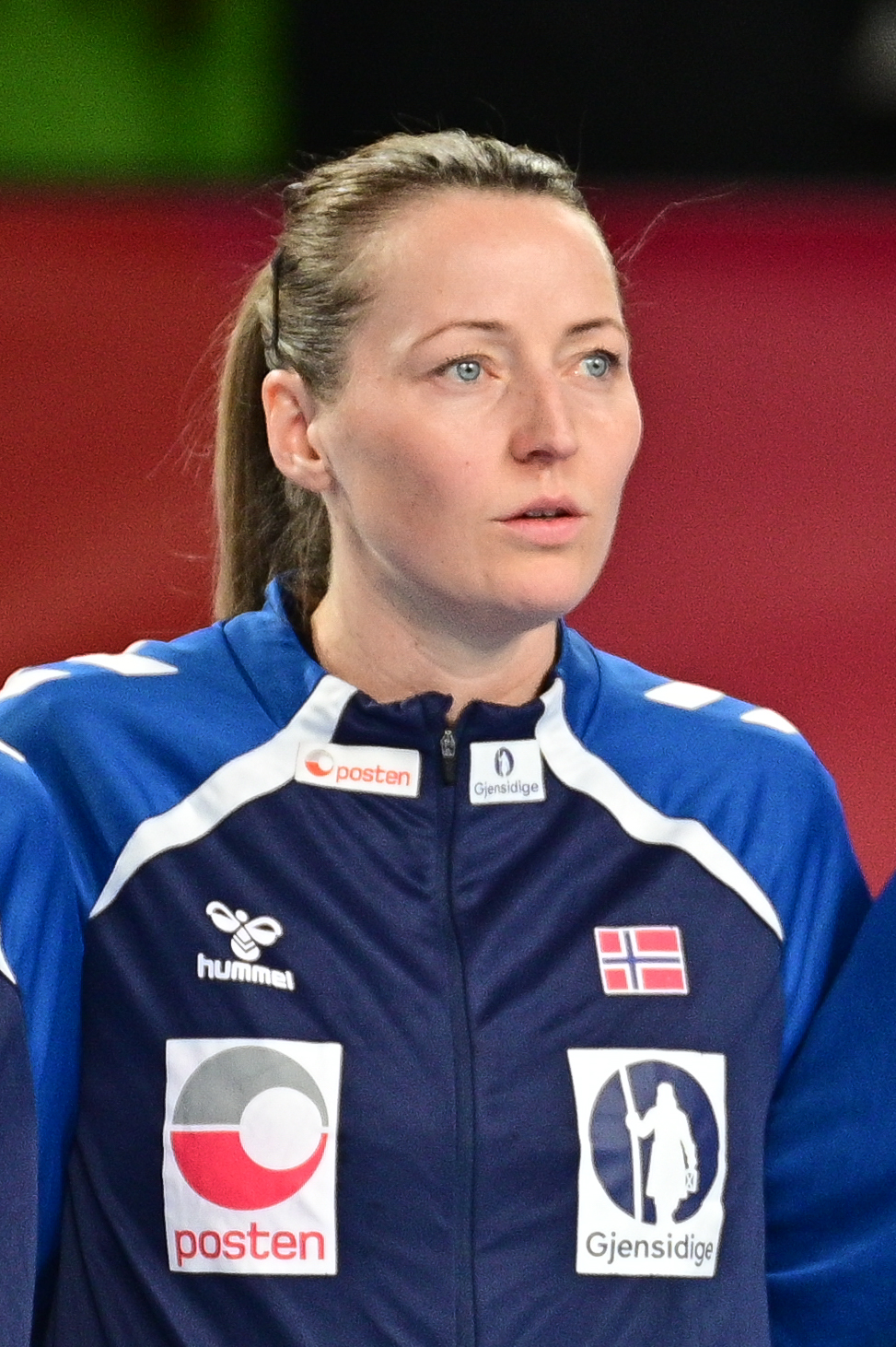
- Solberg-Østhassel in 2024

Personal information
- Full name: Silje Margaretha Solberg-Østhassel
- Nationality: Norwegian
- Born: 16 June 1990 (age 36) Bærum, Norway
- Height: 1.78 m (5 ft 10 in)

Sport
- Sport: Handball
- Position: Goalkeeper
- Current club: Team Esbjerg
- Number: 16

Senior clubs
- Years: Team
- 2006–2007: Helset IF
- 2007–2014: Stabæk IF
- 2014–2016: TTH Holstebro
- 2016–2018: Issy-Paris Hand
- 2018–2020: Siófok KC
- 2020–2024: Győri ETO KC
- 2024–01/2025: Vipers Kristiansand
- 2026–: Team Esbjerg
National team
Years	Team	Apps	(Gls)
2011–	Norway	230	(9)
Medal record
Olympic Games
Gold medal – first place	2024 Paris	Team
Bronze medal – third place	2020 Tokyo	Team
World Championship
Gold medal – first place	2015 Denmark
Gold medal – first place	2021 Spain
Silver medal – second place	2017 Germany
Silver medal – second place	2023 Denmark/Norway/Sweden
European Championship
Gold medal – first place	2014 Croatia/Hungary
Gold medal – first place	2016 Sweden
Gold medal – first place	2020 Denmark
Gold medal – first place	2022 Slovenia/North Macedonia /Montenegro
Gold medal – first place	2024 Austria/Hungary/Switzerland
Silver medal – second place	2012 Serbia
Junior World Championship
Gold medal – first place	2010 South Korea
Junior European Championship
Gold medal – first place	2009 Hungary
- Updated on 27 September 2026

Silje Solberg-Østhassel (born 16 June 1990) is a Norwegian professional handball player for Team Esbjerg and the Norwegian national team.

She is a twin sister of Sanna Solberg-Isaksen and is half Swedish through her mother.

== Career ==
Solberg-Østhassel started playing handball at Helset IF, and later signed for Stabæk IF in the highest Norwegian league, where she played with her sister, Sanna Solberg. In 2011, she reached the final of the Norwegian cup with the club, where they lost to Larvik HK.

In 2014, she joined Danish side Team Tvis Holstebro. Here she won the EHF European League in 2015.

In the summer of 2016, she joined French team Issy-Paris Hand. Two years after she joined Hungarian side Siófok KC.

In 2020, she joined league rivals Győri ETO KC. Here she won the 2021 Hungarian Cup, the 2022 and 2023 Hungarian league and the 2024 EHF Champions League.

In 2023, she took a break from handball due to maternity leave.

In 2024, she returned to Norway to join Vipers Kristiansand. She left the club again only later the same season, when the club went bankrupt.

She then took a break from handball due to maternity leave. She signed for Danish club Team Esbjerg for the 2026-27 season. When Esbjerg keeper Katharina Filter was injured, she agreed to return to Team Esbjerg for the semifinal of the 2025-26 Danish Championship. In her comeback match against Ikast Håndbold, she achieved a save percentage of 45%. Despite the injury problems, Esbjerg would go on to win the Danish Championship, beating Odense Håndbold in the final.

=== National team ===
She debuted for the Norwegian national team on March 27, 2011 in a match against Russia. Her first major international tournament was the 2012 European Championship. Here Norway reached the final, where they lost to Montenegro. A year later she played at the 2013 World Championship.

At the 2014 European Championship she won gold medals with the Norwegian team, and was selected for the tournament all-star team. A year later she won a gold medal at the 2015 World Women's Handball Championship.

At the 2016 European Championship she won her second European gold medal. In 2017 she won silver medals at the 2017 World Championship. She did however only enter the Norwegian team just before the final.

At the 2020 European Championship she won yet another gold medal with Norway. She only entered the Norwegian team for the main round.

At the 2021 Olympics she won bronze medals with Norway. Later the same year she won her second world gold medal at the 2021 World Women's Handball Championship.

At the 2023 World Women's Handball Championship she won silver medals, when Norway lost to France in the final.

At the 2024 Olympics she completed her set of international titles, when Norway won gold medals. Later the same year she won gold medals at the 2024 European Women's Handball Championship.

== Achievements ==
- Olympic Games:
  - Winner: 2024
  - Bronze: 2020
- World Championship:
  - Winner: 2015, 2021
  - Silver Medalist: 2017, 2023
- European Championship:
  - Winner: 2014, 2016, 2020, 2022, 2024
  - Silver Medalist: 2012
- Junior World Championship:
  - Winner: 2010
- Junior European Championship:
  - Winner: 2009
- EHF Champions League:
  - Winner: 2024
  - Silver Medalist: 2022
  - Bronze Medalist: 2021, 2023
- EHF Cup
  - Winner: 2015, 2019
- Hungarian Championship
  - Winner: 2022, 2023
- Magyar Kupa:
  - Winner: 2021
- Norwegian Cup:
  - Finalist: 2011, 2012
- Danish Championship:
  - Winner: 2026

== Individual awards ==
- All-Star Goalkeeper of Danish League 2015/2016
- All-Star Goalkeeper of the European Championship: 2014
- All-Star Goalkeeper of Postenligaen 2013/2014
- MVP of the Møbelringen Cup: 2018

== Personal life ==
She is married. She and her husband, Lars, have two daughters together: Emma, born in August 2023, and Tuva, born in October 2025.
