= Team Esbjerg =

Danish handball club

- Full name: Team Esbjerg Elitehåndbold A/S
- Short name: Esbjerg
- Founded: 1991
- Arena: Blue Water Dokken
- Capacity: 2,996
- President: Bjarne Pedersen
- Head Coach: Tomas Axnér
- League: Bambusa Kvindeligaen
- 2025–26: 1st
- Club colours
Home	Away

Location of Team Esbjerg

Team Esbjerg is a professional women's handball team based in Esbjerg, Denmark, that competes in the Bambusa Kvindeligaen and the 2025–26 Women's EHF Champions League. They play their home matches in Blue Water Dokken, which have capacity for 2,996 spectators. They play games in red shirts and black shorts.

The coaching team consists of Swedish international Tomas Axnér and Rasmus Glad Vandbæk.

== History ==
Team Esbjerg was founded in 1991, as a cooperation between KVIK Esbjerg and Esbjerg Håndboldklub (EHK). They competed in the Danish Handball League for the first time in 1999, but they relegated the following year. They have been part of the league since 2004.

They won the Danish Championship for the first time in 2016, after beating FC Midtjylland Håndbold in the final. They lost the first final match 20–17, but won the second 24–19, after a dramatic penalty shootout. They won their second title in 2019, they also beat Herning-Ikast Håndbold, in two matches, with the scores 28–20 and 19–20. They also won the Danish Women's Handball Cup in 2017, after beating København Håndbold, with the score 31–20.

In the 2021-22 season they reached the Final Four of the EHF Women's Champions League for the first time. They did however only manage to get a fourth place, and they also lost the Danish Championship final to Odense Håndbold.

Over time, the club has had many notable and significant players, like Rikke Zachariassen, Ulrika Toft Hansen, Lotte Grigel, Gøril Snorroeggen, Maibritt Kviesgaard, Kari Aalvik Grimsbø, Emily Stang Sando, Marta Mangué, Laura van der Heijden, Angelica Wallén, Ida Bjørndalen and Sandra Toft Galsgaard.

== Kits ==
HOME
2018–20	2020-

AWAY
2015-17	2018-19	2020-

== Honours ==
- EHF Champions League:
  - Bronze: 2024, 2025
  - Semifinalist: 2022, 2023
- EHF Cup:
  - Silver: 2014, 2019
- Danish Championship:
  - Gold: 2016, 2019, 2020, 2023, 2024, 2026
  - Silver: 2015, 2022, 2025
- Danish Cup
  - Winner: 2017, 2021, 2022, 2023, 2024
  - Silver: 2011, 2025
  - Bronze: 2018
- Danish Super Cup
  - Winner: 2015, 2019, 2022, 2024, 2026

== Arena ==
- Arena: Blue Water Dokken
- City: Esbjerg
- Capacity: 2,996
- Address: Gl. Vardevej 82, 6700 Esbjerg

== Team ==
=== Current squad ===
Squad for the 2026–27 season.

Goalkeepers

- 16 (Norway) Silje Solberg-Østhassel
- 42 (Germany) Katharina Filter

Wingers
LW

- 17 (Sweden) Elin Hansson
- 24 (Norway) Sanna Solberg-Isaksen

RW

- 20 (Norway) Marit Røsberg-Torgersen
- 38 (Switzerland) Mia Emmenegger

Line players

- 7 (Switzerland) Tabea Schmid
- 11 (Denmark) Rikke Iversen
- 18 (Sweden) Olivia Löfqvist

Back players
LB

- 4 (Denmark) Julie Scaglione
- 10 (Norway) Henriette Espetvedt Eggen
- 22 (Denmark) Line Haugsted (pregnant)

CB

- 8 (Norway) Live Rushfeldt Deila
- 25 (Norway) Henny Reistad

RB

- 9 (Norway) Nora Mørk
- 19 (Denmark) Line Jørgensen
- 21 (Denmark) Helene Kindberg

Squad information
No.	Nat.	Player	Position	Date of Birth	In	Contract until
2	(Denmark)	Line Haugsted	Left back	11 November 1994	2024	2028
7	(Switzerland)	Tabea Schmid	Line Player	14 August 2003	2025	2030
8	(Norway)	Live Rushfeldt Deila	Centre Back	15 January 2000	2023	2028
9	(Norway)	Nora Mørk	Right Back	5 April 1991	2022	2028
11	(Denmark)	Rikke Iversen	Line Player	18 May 1993	2023	2028
17	(Sweden)	Elin Hansson	Left Wing	7 August 1996	2024	2028
18	(Sweden)	Olivia Löfqvist	Line Player	13 July 1998	2025	2030
20	(Norway)	Marit Røsberg-Torgersen	Right Wing	25 February 1994	2018	2028
21	(Denmark)	Helene Kindberg	Right Back	13 January 1998	2025	2027
24	(Norway)	Sanna Solberg-Isaksen	Left Wing	16 June 1990	2017	2028
25	(Norway)	Henny Reistad	Left Back	9 February 1999	2021	2027
38	(Switzerland)	Mia Emmenegger	Right Wing	17 January 2005	2025	2030
42	(Germany)	Katharina Filter	Goalkeeper	4 February 1999	2025	2030

=== Transfers ===
Transfers for the season 2027–28

Joining

- (Denmark) Jesper Jensen (Head coach) (from (Hungary) Ferencvárosi TC)
- (Denmark) Stine Nørklit Lønborg (CB) (from (France) Jeanne d'Arc Dijon Handball)?

Leaving

- (Sweden) Tomas Axnér (Head coach)
- (Norway) Henny Reistad (CB) (to (France) Brest Bretagne Handball)

=== Technical staff ===
- (Sweden) Head coach: Tomas Axnér
- (Denmark) Assistant coach: Rasmus Glad Vandbæk
- (Denmark) Goalkeeping coach: Tim Winkler
- (Denmark) Sportdirector: Thomas Hylle
- (Denmark) Teamleader: Helle Kongsbak
- (Denmark) Physiotherapist: Kenneth Hansen
- (Denmark) Physiotherapist: Daniel Bargsteen
- (Denmark) Video: Jes Juncker-Jensen

=== Former notable players ===
- (Denmark) Sandra Toft (2017–2019)
- (Denmark) Rikke Poulsen (2019–2023)
- (Denmark) Mette Tranborg (2020–2025)
- (Denmark) Kathrine Heindahl (2022–2025)
- (Denmark) Stine Bodholt Nielsen (2014–2016)
- (Denmark) Rikke Schmidt (2012–2014)
- (Denmark) Lotte Grigel (2008–2015)
- (Denmark) Maibritt Kviesgaard (2013–2018)
- (Denmark) Rikke Zachariassen (2006–2018)
- (Denmark) Annette Jensen (2018–2022)
- (Denmark) Kaja Kamp (2020–2025)
- (Denmark) Maria Mose Vestergaard (2014–2019)
- (Denmark) Amalie Milling (2022–2025)
- (Denmark) Elma Halilcevic (2017–2021)
- (Norway) Kari Aalvik Grimsbø (2010–2015)
- (Norway) Kristine Breistøl (2018–2024)
- (Norway) Vilde Ingstad (2016–2023)
- (Norway) Marit Malm Frafjord (2018–2022)
- (Norway) Siri Seglem (2007–2009)
- (Norway) Emily Stang Sando (2013–2017)
- (Norway) Gøril Snorroeggen (2010–2013)
- (Norway) Betina Riegelhuth (2015–2016)
- (Norway) Ida Bjørndalen Karlsson (2014–2018)
- (Norway) Ine Karlsen Stangvik (2017–2018)
- (Norway) Rikke Granlund (2018–2021)
- (Norway) Julie Bøe Jacobsen (2022–2024)
- (Sweden) Johanna Ahlm (2013–2015)
- (Sweden) Angelica Wallén (2010–2013)
- (Sweden) Filippa Idéhn (2015–2017)
- (Sweden) Jenny Alm (2015–2017)
- (Sweden) Jessica Helleberg (2011–2013)
- (Sweden) Anna-Maria Johansson (2009–2011)
- (Sweden) Ulrika Toft Hansen (2015–2018)
- (Sweden) Clara Monti Danielsson (2018–2020)
- (Spain) Marta Mangué (2007–2011)
- (Spain) Lara González Ortega (2016–2018)
- (Spain) Nerea Pena (2020–2021)
- (Netherlands) Estavana Polman (2013–2022)
- (Netherlands) Laura van der Heijden (2014–2017)
- (Netherlands) Merel Freriks (2025)
- (Serbia) Katarina Tomašević (2007–2009)
- (Serbia) Kristina Liščević (2017–2019)
- (Iceland) Arna Sif Pálsdóttir (2010–2011)
- (Iceland) Rut Arnfjörð Jónsdóttir (2017–2020)
- (France) Paule Baudouin (2008–2010)
- (Tunisia) Mouna Chebbah (2008–2010)
- (Austria) Sonja Frey (2019–2021)
- (Germany) Dinah Eckerle (2021–2023)
- (England) Kelsi Fairbrother (2010–2013)
- (Turkey) Beyza Irem Türkoglu (2021–2023)
- (Hungary) Beatrix Benyáts (2004–2006)

== Statistics ==
=== Top scorers in the EHF Champions League ===
Last updated on 8 November 2026

Rank	Name	Seasons played	Goals
1	(Norway) Henny Reistad	6	697
2	(Norway) Kristine Breistøl	5	332
3	(Norway) Nora Mørk	5	276
4	(Norway) Sanna Solberg-Isaksen	9	260
5	(Norway) Marit Røsberg-Torgersen	8	254
6	(Denmark) Michala Møller	6	220
7	(Norway) Vilde Ingstad	5	202
8	(Denmark) Mette Tranborg	4	183
9	(Denmark) Kaja Kamp	5	150
10	(Norway) Live Rushfeldt Deila	4	141

=== Individual awards in the EHF Champions League ===
Season	Player	Award
2019–20	(Norway) Sanna Solberg-Isaksen	All-Star Team (Best Left Wing)
2021–22	(Norway) Sanna Solberg-Isaksen	All-Star Team (Best Left Wing)

== Head coach history ==
(Denmark)	Thomas Hylle	1997–2002
(Denmark)	Jan Leslie	2004–2006
(Denmark)	Thomas Hørlyk	2006–2007
(Denmark)	Teddy Barrett	2007–2008
(Denmark)	Jan Paulsen	2008–2011
(Denmark)	Lars Frederiksen	2011–2017
(Denmark)	Jesper Jensen	2017–2024
(Sweden)	Tomas Axnér	2024–2027

== European record ==
=== Champions League ===
Season	Competition	Round	Club	1st leg	2nd leg	Aggregate
2015–16	EHF Champions League	Qualification tournament	(Turkey) Yenimahalle Bld. SK	32–28		
2015–16	EHF Champions League	Qualification tournament	(Romania) HCM Baia Mare	21–32		
2016–17	EHF Champions League	Group Stage; Group D	(Slovenia) RK Krim	35–25	22–27	3rd place
2016–17	EHF Champions League	Group Stage; Group D	(Norway) Larvik HK	29–30	24–31	3rd place
2016–17	EHF Champions League	Group Stage; Group D	(Sweden) IK Sävehof	29–18	25–20	3rd place
2016–17	EHF Champions League	Main Round; Group 2	(Romania) CSM București	20–25	25–33	6th place
2016–17	EHF Champions League	Main Round; Group 2	(Hungary) Győri ETO KC	26–32	22–33	6th place
2016–17	EHF Champions League	Main Round; Group 2	(Denmark) Midtjylland	22–21	26–38	6th place
2019–20	EHF Champions League	Group Stage; Group B	(Russia) Rostov-Don	31–26	26–34	2nd place
2019–20	EHF Champions League	Group Stage; Group B	(Romania) CSM București	22–24	25–21	2nd place
2019–20	EHF Champions League	Group Stage; Group B	(Poland) MKS Perła Lublin	35–22	28–22	2nd place
2019–20	EHF Champions League	Main Round; Group 1	(France) Metz Handball	30–29	31–31	2nd place
2019–20	EHF Champions League	Main Round; Group 1	(Norway) Vipers Kristiansand	35–30	35–31	2nd place
2019–20	EHF Champions League	Main Round; Group 1	(Hungary) Ferencvárosi TC	29–27	25–26	2nd place
2019–20	EHF Champions League	Quarterfinals	(Montenegro) Budućnost Podgorica	Cancelled		
2020–21	Champions League	Group Stage; Group A	(France) Metz Handball	25–28	29–31	6th place
2020–21	Champions League	Group Stage; Group A	(Russia) Rostov-Don	24–25	24–28	6th place
2020–21	Champions League	Group Stage; Group A	(Norway) Vipers Kristiansand	27–27	28–28	6th place
2020–21	Champions League	Group Stage; Group A	(Hungary) Ferencvárosi TC	21–24	28–24	6th place
2020–21	Champions League	Group Stage; Group A	(Romania) CSM București	29–30	26–28	6th place
2020–21	Champions League	Group Stage; Group A	(Germany) SG BBM Bietigheim	37–29	33–26	6th place
2020–21	Champions League	Group Stage; Group A	(Slovenia) RK Krim	33–23	10–0	6th place
2020–21	Champions League	Round of 16	(France) Brest Bretagne Handball	27–33	27–30	54–63
2021–22	Champions League	Group stage Group A	(France) Brest Bretagne Handball	28–28	23–26	1st place
2021–22	Champions League	Group stage Group A	(Hungary) FTC-Rail Cargo Hungaria	33–27	31–31	1st place
2021–22	Champions League	Group stage Group A	(Montenegro) Budućnost BEMAX	35–20	36–25	1st place
2021–22	Champions League	Group stage Group A	(Romania) CSM București	22–21	29–29	1st place
2021–22	Champions League	Group stage Group A	(Germany) BV Borussia 09 Dortmund	34–24	32–29	1st place
2021–22	Champions League	Group stage Group A	(Russia) Rostov-Don	25–18	27–25	1st place
2021–22	Champions League	Group stage Group A	(Croatia) HC Podravka Vegeta	30–17	27–26	1st place
2021–22	Champions League	Quarterfinals	(Romania) CSM București	27–27	26–25	53–52
2021–22	Champions League	Semifinal	(Hungary) Győri Audi ETO KC	27–32		
2021–22	Champions League	Bronze match	(France) Metz Handball	26–32		
2022–23	EHF Champions League	Group stage Group B	(Hungary) Győri Audi ETO KC	29–31	28–29	3rd
2022–23	EHF Champions League	Group stage Group B	(France) Metz Handball	35–28	24–26	3rd
2022–23	EHF Champions League	Group stage Group B	(Romania) CS Rapid București	32–34	35–30	3rd
2022–23	EHF Champions League	Group stage Group B	(Montenegro) ŽRK Budućnost Podgorica	28–23	30–20	3rd
2022–23	EHF Champions League	Group stage Group B	(Norway) Storhamar HE	35–25	34–25	3rd
2022–23	EHF Champions League	Group stage Group B	(Turkey) Kastamonu Bld. GSK	43–27	39–31	3rd
2022–23	EHF Champions League	Group stage Group B	(Croatia) RK Lokomotiva Zagreb	30–18	33–20	3rd
2022–23	EHF Champions League	Playoffs	(France) Brest Bretagne	28–25	27–24	55–49
2022–23	EHF Champions League	Quarterfinals	(Romania) CSM București	32–28	33–31	65–59
2022–23	EHF Champions League	Semifinal	(Hungary) Ferencvárosi TC	29–30		
2022–23	EHF Champions League	Bronze match	(Hungary) Győri Audi ETO KC	27–28		
2023–24	EHF Champions League	Group stage Group B	(France) Metz Handball	29–27	31–36	2nd
2023–24	EHF Champions League	Group stage Group B	(Norway) Vipers Kristiansand	38–37	32–37	2nd
2023–24	EHF Champions League	Group stage Group B	(Romania) CS Rapid București	30–28	33–24	2nd
2023–24	EHF Champions League	Group stage Group B	(Hungary) FTC-Rail Cargo Hungaria	27–23	33–28	2nd
2023–24	EHF Champions League	Group stage Group B	(Poland) Zagłębie Lubin	36–24	32–26	2nd
2023–24	EHF Champions League	Group stage Group B	(Slovenia) RK Krim Mercator	27–33	29–21	2nd
2023–24	EHF Champions League	Group stage Group B	(Denmark) Ikast Håndbold	35–34	37–34	2nd
2023–24	EHF Champions League	Quarterfinals	(Hungary) Ferencvárosi TC	29–24	26–25	55–49
2023–24	EHF Champions League	Semifinal	(Hungary) Győri ETO KC	23–24		
2023–24	EHF Champions League	Bronze match	(France) Metz Handball	37–33		
2024–25	EHF Champions League	Group B	(Norway) Vipers Kristiansand	30–29	10–0	2nd
2024–25	EHF Champions League	Group B	(Montenegro) ŽRK Budućnost Podgorica	27–23	26–19	2nd
2024–25	EHF Champions League	Group B	(Germany) HB Ludwigsburg	36–31	30–30	2nd
2024–25	EHF Champions League	Group B	(Hungary) Győri Audi ETO KC	26–28	23–29	2nd
2024–25	EHF Champions League	Group B	(France) Brest Bretagne Handball	32–33	36–27	2nd
2024–25	EHF Champions League	Group B	(Romania) CS Rapid București	39–32	28–26	2nd
2024–25	EHF Champions League	Group B	(Denmark) Odense Håndbold	39–30	32–23	2nd
2024–25	EHF Champions League	Quarterfinals	(Romania) CSM București	26–22	29–30	55–52
2024–25	EHF Champions League	Semifinal	(Hungary) Győri Audi ETO KC	28–29		
2024–25	EHF Champions League	Bronze match	(France) Metz Handball	30–27		
2025–26	EHF Champions League	Group A	(Hungary) Győri ETO KC	30–31	33–28	3rd
2025–26	EHF Champions League	Group A	(France) Metz Handball	29–30	26–40	3rd
2025–26	EHF Champions League	Group A	(Norway) Storhamar HE	30–24	39–33	3rd
2025–26	EHF Champions League	Group A	(Romania) Gloria Bistrița-Năsăud	35–38	32–28	3rd
2025–26	EHF Champions League	Group A	(Germany) Borussia Dortmund	36–29	31–24	3rd
2025–26	EHF Champions League	Group A	(Montenegro) OTP Group Budućnost	36–24	34–34	3rd
2025–26	EHF Champions League	Group A	(Hungary) DVSC Schaeffler	32–29	39–30	3rd
2025–26	EHF Champions League	Playoffs	(Croatia) HC Podravka Vegeta	37–26	31–29	68–55
2025–26	EHF Champions League	Quarterfinals	(Romania) CSM București	26–25	27–37	53–62
2026–27	EHF Champions League	Group stage Group A	(Germany) Borussia Dortmund	33–24		
2026–27	EHF Champions League	Group stage Group A	(Norway) Sola HK	28–25		
2026–27	EHF Champions League	Group stage Group A	(Slovenia) RK Krim Mercator	37–31		
2026–27	EHF Champions League	Group stage Group A	(Montenegro) OTP Group Budućnost	27–21		
2026–27	EHF Champions League	Group stage Group A	(Romania) CSM București	31–34		
2026–27	EHF Champions League	Group stage Group A	(France) Brest Bretagne Handball	35–26		
2026–27	EHF Champions League	Group stage Group A	(Hungary) FTC-Rail Cargo Hungaria	29–26		

=== European League (EHF Cup) ===
Season	Competition	Round	Club	1st leg	2nd leg	Aggregate
2010–11	EHF Cup	Round 3	(Germany) Buxtehuder SV	28–23	25–29	53–52
2010–11	EHF Cup	Last 16	(Romania) HC Dunărea Brăila	25–22	21–20	46–42
2010–11	EHF Cup	Quarterfinals	(Denmark) FC Midtjylland	21–27	29–24	50–51
2011–12	EHF Cup	Round 3	(Greece) Anagennisi Arta	31–15	36–14	67–29
2011–12	EHF Cup	Last 16	(Denmark) Team Tvis Holstebro	28–27	24–27	52–54
2013–14	EHF Cup	Round 3	(Serbia) RK Radnički Kragujevac	26–26	28–24	54–50
2013–14	EHF Cup	Last 16	(Czech Republic) DHK Baník Most	28–26	28–21	56–47
2013–14	EHF Cup	Quarterfinals	(Russia) Dinamo Volgograd	36–27	30–26	66–63
2013–14	EHF Cup	Semifinals	(Hungary) Alba Fehérvár KC	24–25	27–26	51–51 (a)
2013–14	EHF Cup	Final	(Russia) HC Lada	32–32	25–36	57–68
2014–15	EHF Cup	Round 3	(Slovenia) RŽK Zagorje	35–26	33–22	68–48
2014–15	EHF Cup	Last 16	(Sweden) H 65 Höör	33–25	33–28	66–53
2014–15	EHF Cup	Quarterfinals	(Hungary) Érd NK	28–29	20–28	48–57
2018–19	EHF Cup	Round 3	(France) Paris 92	29–28	31–25	60–53
2018–19	EHF Cup	Group A	(Norway) Storhamar HE	25–20	28–28	1st place
2018–19	EHF Cup	Group A	(Germany) SG BBM Bietigheim	28–27	32–27	1st place
2018–19	EHF Cup	Group A	(Romania) CS Măgura Cisnădie	41–18	32–19	1st place
2018–19	EHF Cup	Quarterfinals	(Russia) HC Kuban Krasnodar	37–24	37–31	74–55
2018–19	EHF Cup	Semifinals	(Denmark) Herning-Ikast Håndbold	30–16	23–20	53–36
2018–19	EHF Cup	Final	(Hungary) Siófok KC	21–21	21–26	42–47

=== EHF Cup Winners' Cup ===
Season	Competition	Round	Club	1st leg	2nd leg	Aggregate
EHF Cup Winners' Cup	2012–13	Round 3	(Netherlands) Quintus	36–25	26–23	62–48
EHF Cup Winners' Cup	2012–13	Last 16	(Russia) Rostov-Don	28–31	28–29	56–60
EHF Cup Winners' Cup	2015–16	Round 3	(Turkey) Ardeşen GSK	30–26	22–31	52–57
