= Blue Water Dokken =

Sports venue in Esbjerg, Denmark

Coordinates: 55.4831°N 8.4390°E

- Interactive map of Blue Water Dokken
- Full name: Blue Water Dokken
- Former names: Esbjerg Stadionhal
- Location: Esbjerg, Denmark
- Capacity: 2,549 (handball)

Construction
- Built: 1968
- Opened: 2012
- Cost: 59 million DKK
- Architect: Årstiderne arkitekter

Tenants
- Team Esbjerg; Ribe-Esbjerg HH

Blue Water Dokken is a multi-purpose indoor arena in Esbjerg, Denmark. Its best known tenant is the women's handball club Team Esbjerg, one of the top teams of the Danish championship, that also regularly plays in Europe, having reached the EHF Cup final in 2014. Beside handball it also hosts other indoor sports as well as concerts, shows and others.

== Gallery ==
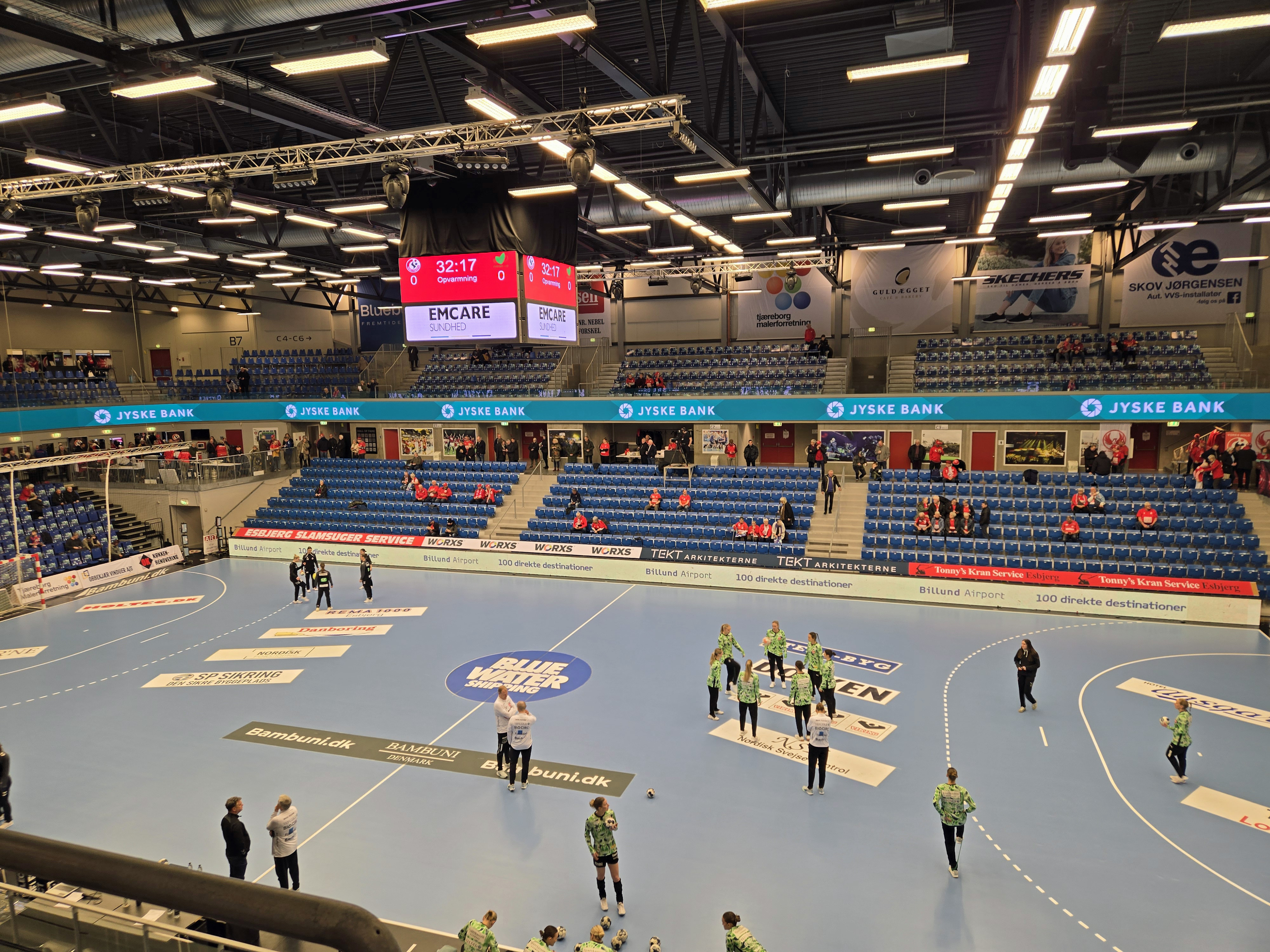
Interior of Blue Water Dokken during a Team Esbjerg match
