= Jesper Jensen (handballer) =

Danish handball player (born 1977)

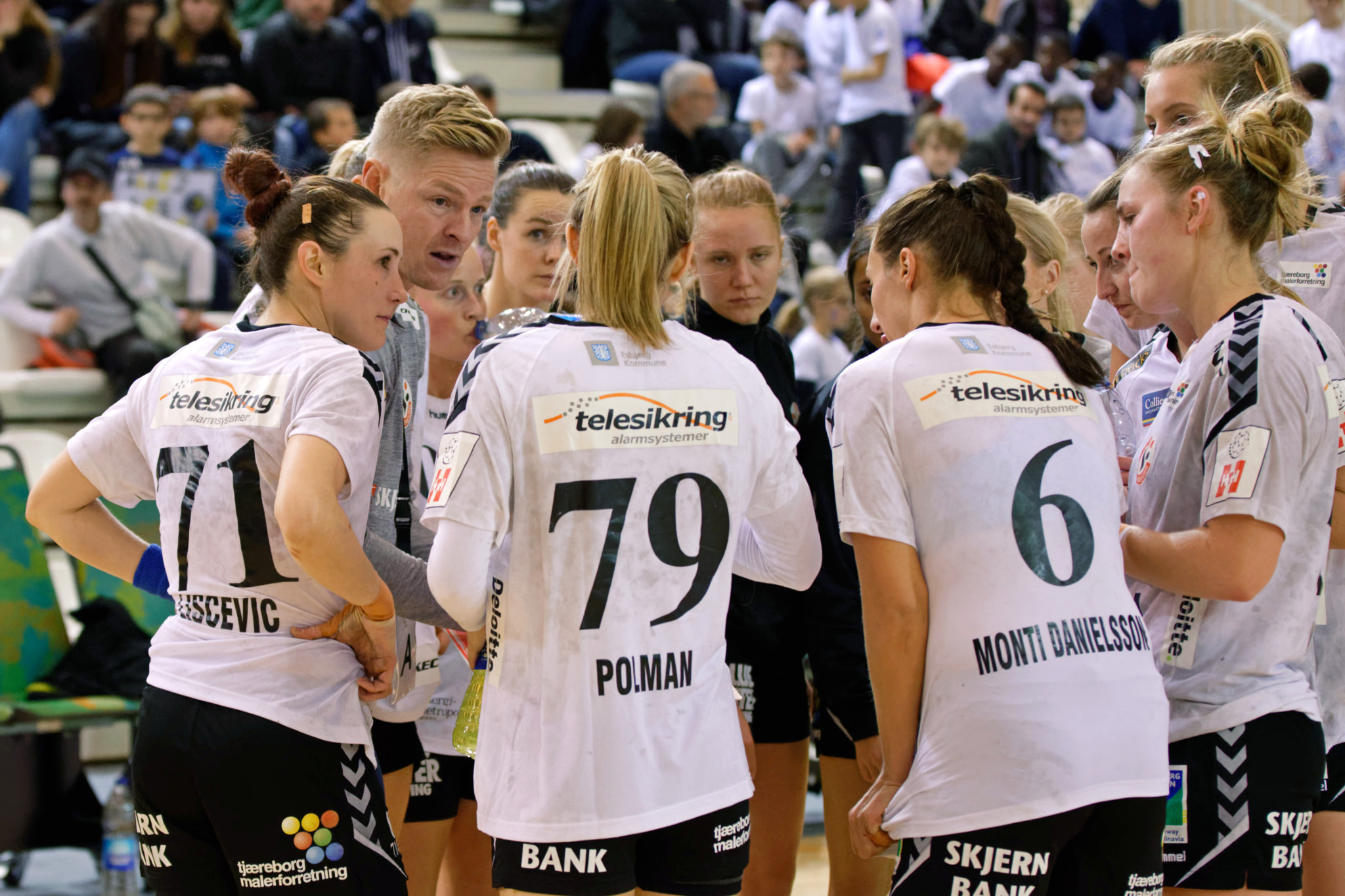
- Jesper Jensen in 2018

Personal information
- Nationality: Danish
- Born: 30 October 1977 (age 48) Aarhus, Denmark
- Height: 1.88 m (6 ft 2 in)

Sport
- Sport: Handball
- Position: Central back
- Current club: Denmark (manager)

Youth career
- Years: Team
- –: HEI Skæring

Senior clubs
- Years: Team
- –1999: Team Esbjerg
- 1999–2013: Skjern Håndbold
National team
| Years | Team | Apps | (Gls) |
| 2001–2011 | Denmark | 120 | (238) |

Teams managed
- 2013–2014: Vejen EH
- 2014–2016: Aalborg Håndbold
- 2017–2024: Team Esbjerg
- 2020–2025: Denmark
- 2025–2027: Ferencvárosi TC
- 2027–: Team Esbjerg
Medal record
Men's handball
Representing Denmark
World Championship
| Bronze medal – third place | 2007 Germany |
European Championship
| Gold medal – first place | 2008 Norway |
| Bronze medal – third place | 2006 Switzerland |
Junior World Championship
| Gold medal – first place | 1997 Turkey |

Jesper Jensen (born 30 October 1977) is a Danish former handball player and current manager of the Danish women's national team. He was named World Coach of the Year (female teams) in 2021 by IHF.

Jensen comes from a handball family. He is brother of the former Danish handball player and 2004 Olympic champion, Trine Jensen. His mother played for the Danish club Vejlby-Risskov Idrætsklub, and his father was a handball referee.

Jensen won the 2008 European Men's Handball Championship with the Danish men's national handball team. He was part of the team which finished seventh in the 2008 Olympic tournament. He played all eight matches and scored 16 goals.

On 17 February 2011, Jensen retired from the Danish men's national team after 120 games and 238 goals.

== Coaching career ==
After his playing career Jensen became the head coach of the Vejen EH women's team in 2013. He coached them for a single season until switching to Aalborg Håndbold. In March 2016 he was fired due to disappointing results. The club was in 7th place at the time.

In 2017 he became the assistant coach at Team Esbjerg. When the club fired head coach Lars Frederiksen in May 2017, Jesper Jensen was promoted to head coach. Jensen has announced, that he does not intend to continue, when his contract expired in the summer 2024. He was replaced by Swedish coach Tomas Axnér. During his time with Team Esbjerg he won the Danish Women's Coach Award 5 times; in 2018, 2019, 2020, 2022 and 2024.

=== Danish women's coach ===
In 2020, he was named head coach of the Danish women's national team, a position he has held simultaneously with the position at Team Esbjerg. He coached Denmark at the 2020 European Women's Handball Championship. He won silver with the Danish women's national team at the 2022 European Women's Handball Championship and, the next year, bronze at the World Championship.

Following the 2024 European Championship, where Denmark won silver medals, he announced his intention to retire from the position in the summer of 2025. A week later he announced that he would join Hungarian top club Ferencvaros. He was replaced by Helle Thomsen who takes over in the summer of 2025.

=== Return to club handball ===
In October 2026 it was announced that he would leave Ferencvaros when his contract expired after the season, and return to Team Esbjerg for the 2027-28 season.
