= 2013–14 Women's EHF Cup =

European handball tournament

EHF Cup
- 2013–14

Tournament information
- Sport: Handball
- Dates: 5 October 2013–11 May 2014
- Teams: 42

Final positions
- Champions: (Russia) Lada Togliatti
- Runner-up: (Denmark) Team Esbjerg

Tournament statistics
- Matches played: 82
- Top scorer(s): (Sweden) Johanna Ahlm (Netherlands) Estavana Polman (59 goals)

The 2013–14 Women's EHF Cup was the 33rd edition of EHF's second-tier women's handball competition. It started on 5 October 2013.

== Qualifying stages ==
=== First qualifier ===
Local team	Aggregate	Away team	1st leg	2nd leg
Zrinjski Mostar (Bosnia and Herzegovina)	30–63	(Netherlands) VOC Amsterdam	17–34	13–29
DHW Antwerpen (Belgium)	38–66	(Croatia) Liones Samobor	20–37	18–29
HC Gomel (Belarus)	50–43	(Portugal) Colégio João de Barros	24–20	26–23
Ormi Patras (Greece)	35–46	(Luxembourg) HB Dudelange	16–24	19–22
Olympia London (England)	27–58	(Iceland) Fram Reykjavík	13–38	14–20
Karpaty Uzhhorod (Ukraine)	70–50	(Lithuania) Žalgiris Kaunas	28–23	42–27
Baník Most (Czech Republic)	48–39	(Norway) Levanger HK	27–22	21–17
Bnei Herzliya (Israel)	45–81	(Slovakia) Iuventa Michalovce	28–40	17–41
Etar Veliko Tarnovo (Bulgaria)	44–50	(Greece) PAOK	24–22	20–28
Kastrioti Ferizaj (Kosovo)	56–67	(Belgium) Fémina Visé	25–30	31–37

=== Second qualifier ===
Local team	Aggregate	Away team	1st leg	2nd leg
Lada Togliatti (Russia)	70–55	(Croatia) Liones Samobor	33–26	37–29
Fram Reykjavík (Iceland)	42–70	(Hungary) Alba Fehérvár KC	20–34	22–36
HC Zalău (Romania)	53–54	(Czech Republic) Baník Most	28–21	25–33
Rocasa Remudas (Spain)	56–46	(Belarus) HC Gomel	30–20	26–26
Universitatea Cluj (Romania)	71–53	(Greece) PAOK	39–25	32–28
HC Astrakhanochka (Russia)	61–47	(Poland) Politechnika Koszalin	36–27	25–20
Fémina Visé (Belgium)	46–51	(Turkey) Çankaya Belediyesi	24–22	22–29
Elche Mustang (Spain)	74–48	(Luxembourg) HB Dudelange	40–22	34–26
Iuventa Michalovce (Slovakia)	52–51	(Slovenia) Gen-I Zagorje	31–24	21–27
Love Tiles Alavarium (Portugal)	55–81	(Germany) Bayer Leverkusen	28–43	27–38
Dynamo Volgograd (Russia)	72–37	(Switzerland) LC Brühl	36–22	36–15
Žito Prilep (North Macedonia)	20–69	(Germany) Frisch Auf Göppingen	8–38	12–31
Karpaty Uzhhorod (Ukraine)	44–56	(Denmark) København HB	17–22	27–34
Radnički Kragujevac (Serbia)	50–54	(Denmark) Team Esbjerg	24–28	26–26
Váci NKSE (Hungary)	49–43	(Netherlands) VOC Amsterdam	25–18	24–25
Skuru IK (Sweden)	73–61	(Spain) Helvetia Alcobendas	34–28	39–33

== Final stages ==
First round
(Russia) HC Astrakhanochka	40	33	73
(Spain) Elche Mustang	21	23	44
(Slovakia) Iuventa Michalovce	33	18	51
(Germany) Bayer Leverkusen (a)	27	24	51
(Spain) Rocasa Remudas	28	16	44
(Russia) Lada Togliatti	30	26	56
(Germany) Frisch Auf Göppingen	22	22	44
(Denmark) København HB	25	31	56
(Russia) Dynamo Volgograd	29	23	52
(Sweden) Skuru IK	22	21	43
(Czech Republic) Baník Most	21	26	47
(Denmark) Team Esbjerg	28	28	56
(Turkey) Çankaya Belediyesi	22	23	45
(Romania) Universitatea Cluj	34	32	66
(Hungary) Alba Fehérvár KC	22	24	46
(Hungary) Váci NKSE	19	25	44

Quarter-finals
(Russia) HC Astrakhanochka	30	28	58
(Germany) Bayer Leverkusen	28	25	53
(Russia) Lada Togliatti	27	33	60
(Denmark) København HB	19	27	46
(Russia) Dynamo Volgograd	36	27	63
(Denmark) Team Esbjerg	30	36	66
(Romania) Universitatea Cluj	21	21	42
(Hungary) Alba Fehérvár KC	28	24	52

Semi-finals
(Russia) HC Astrakhanochka	31	22	53
(Russia) Lada Togliatti	24	31	55
(Denmark) Team Esbjerg (a)	24	27	51
(Hungary) Alba Fehérvár KC	25	26	51

Final
(Russia) Lada Togliatti	36	32	68
(Denmark) Team Esbjerg	25	32	57
