= Danish Women's Handball Cup =

Danish handball tournament

Tournament information
- Location: Denmark
- Established: 1964
- Qualifier for: EHF European League
- Most championships: FIF (11 titles)
- Website: www.dhf.dk

Current champion
- Odense Håndbold (2025)

The Danish Women's Handball Cup (Danish: DHF's Landspokalturnering), known as the Santander Cup for sponsorship reasons, is the main domestic cup tournament for Danish women's handball clubs, which is partially organised and supervised by the Danish Handball Federation. The competition has been played annually since 1964.

== Tournament structure ==
The initial fase of the tournament is split in two. They are managed by the three regional federations, Jydsk Håndbold Forbund (JHF) in Jutland, and Håndboldregion Øst (HRØ) in Sealand together with Fyns Håndbold Forbund (FHF) in fyn. The western half of the initial tournament lasts 7 rounds, while the eastern half lasts 6 round. After the initial fase the DHF taking over the tournament at the round of 16. At the round of 16 and onwards, there are no longer geographical considerations, when drawing the matches. The tournament ultimately results in a final four event scheduled between Christmas and New Year. The winner of the tournament qualify for the annual Super Cup held during the summer where they meet the season's league winner. If the same team wins both the league and the cup, the losing cup finalist will participate as the second team in the Super Cup.

== Continental Qualification ==
The winner of the tournament qualifies for the continental tournament EHF European League. If the team is already qualified for the tournament or the EHF Champions League, the loser of the final will qualify instead. If they are also qualified, the qualification spot will go the whichever of the two losing semifinalists, who finished the highest in the league table.

== History ==
The cup was played for the first time in 1964, the same time as the Danish Men's Handball Cup.

From the 2015-16 season onwards, DHF introduced a final four event.

== Past winners ==
=== Finals ===
The following table contains all the finals from the over fifty years long history of the Danish Women's Handball Cup.

| * | Match went to extra time |
| p | Match decided by a penalty shootout after extra time |
| a | Winning team won the Double |

| No. | Season | Winners | Score | Runners-up | Arena | Date of final(s) |
|---|---|---|---|---|---|---|
| 1. | 1964 | FIF (1) | 13–9 | Helsingør IF | Frederiksberghallen, Frederiksberg | 19 January 1965 |
| 2. | 1965 | FIF (2) | 13–7 | Holte IF | Holtehallen, Holte | 19 October 1965 |
| 3. | 1966 | HG (1) | 7–6 | FIF | Bellahøjhallen, Copenhagen | 16 November 1966 |
| 4. | 1967 | FIF (3) | 14–11 | Kvindelig IF | Frederiksberghallen, Frederiksberg | 14 November 1967 |
| 5. | 1968 | Glostrup IC (1) | 7–6 | Kvindelig IF | Glostruphallen, Glostrup | 19 November 1968 |
| 6. | 1969 | FIF (4) | 11–9 | IK Skovbakken | Vejlby/Risskov Centret, Aarhus | 9 November 1969 |
| 7. | 1970 | FIF (5) | 12–9 | DHG | Esbjerg Stadionhal, Esbjerg | 15 November 1970 |
| 8. | 1971 | Hørsholm-Usserød (1) | 10–7 | IK Skovbakken | Fredericiahallen, Fredericia | 14 November 1971 |
| 9. | 1972 | FIF (6) | 13–12 | Funder GF | Silkeborghallen, Silkeborg | 26 November 1972 |
| 10. | 1973 | FIF (7) | 15–10 | Glostrup IC | Frederiksberghallen, Frederiksberg | 29 November 1973 |
| 11. | 1974 | HG (2) | 15–7 | IF AIA Tranbjerg | Fredericiahallen, Fredericia | 10 November 1974 |
| 12. | 1975 | Svendborg HK (1) | 10–9 | FIF | Svendborg Idrætshal, Svendborg | 23 November 1975 |
| 13. | 1976 | Svendborg HK (2) | 11–10 | Kvindelig IF | Svendborg Idrætshal, Svendborg | 30 November 1976 |
| 14. | 1977 | IF AIA Tranbjerg (1) | 15–7 | GIC/Efterslægten | Auninghallen, Auning | 14 December 1977 |
| 15. | 1978/79 | IF AIA Tranbjerg (2) | 15–6 | HK Roar | Gladsaxehallen, Gladsaxe | 8 April 1979 |
| 16. | 1979/80 | IF AIA Tranbjerg (3) | 13–10 | Greve IF | Grønløkkehallen, Tranbjerg | 9 April 1980 |
| 17. | 1980/81 | IF AIA Tranbjerg (4) | 15–12 | IF Stjernen | Århus Stadionhal, Aarhus | 9 April 1981 |
| 18. | 1981/82 | FIF (8) | 11–10 | Lynge-Uggeløse IF | Lyngehallen, Lynge | 14 April 1982 |
| 19. | 1982/83 | Helsingør IF (1) | 20–14 | Nørlem/Nr. Nissum | K.B. Hallen, Frederiksberg | 17 April 1983 |
| 20. | 1983/84 | Nørlem/Nr. Nissum (1) | 16–14 | FIF | Limfjordshallen, Lemvig | 17 April 1984 |
| 21. | 1984/85 | FIF (9) | 19–16 | Rødovre HK | Frederiksberghallen, Frederiksberg | 18 April 1985 |
| 22. | 1985/86 | Lyngså BK (1) | 44–43 (agg.) | IF AIA Tranbjerg | Sæby and Tranbjerg | 13/16 April 1986 |
| 23. | 1986/87 | Lyngså BK (2) | 39–32 (agg.) | Rødovre HK | Sæby and Rødovre | 18/27 March 1987 |
| 24. | 1987/88 | Lyngså BK (3) | 20–13 | FIF | Antvorskovhallen, Slagelse | 20 February 1988 |
| 25. | 1988 | GOG Håndbold (1) | 28–20 | Lyngså BK | Antvorskovhallen, Slagelse | 17 December 1988 |
| 26. | 1988/89 | GOG Håndbold (2) | 24–17 | Ribe HK | Brøndbyhallen, Brøndby | 16 December 1989 |
| 27. | 1989/90 | Ikast FS (1) | 16–14 (a.e.t.) | FIF | Silkeborghallen, Silkeborg | 30 January 1991 |
| 28. | 1991 | GOG Håndbold (3) | 13–12 | FIF | Antvorskovhallen, Slagelse | 14 December 1991 |
| 29. | 1991/92 | GOG Håndbold (4) | 17–15 | FIF | Odense Idrætshal, Odense | 2 December 1992 |
| 30. | 1992/93 | Viborg HK (1) | 27–14 | Rødovre HK | Århus Stadionhal, Aarhus | 26 January 1994 |
| 31. | 1993/94 | Viborg HK (2) | 29–24 | Ikast FS | Randershallen, Randers | 11 January 1995 |
| 32. | 1994/95 | FIF (10) | 25–19 | GOG Håndbold | Odense Idrætshal, Odense | 31 January 1996 |
| 33. | 1995/96 | Viborg HK (3) | 29–25 | Frederikshavn fI | Kolding-Hallen, Kolding | 29 December 1996 |
| 34. | 1996/97 | FIF (11) | 34–31 | Frederikshavn fI | K.B. Hallen, Frederiksberg | 15 January 1998 |
| 35. | 1997/98 | Ikast FS (2) | 24–22 | FIF | Fredericia Idrætscenter, Fredericia | 17 January 1999 |
| 36. | 1998/99 | Ikast-Bording EH (1) | 26–24 | Viborg HK | Randershallen, Randers | 29 December 1999 |
| 37. | 1999/2000 | GOG Håndbold (5) | 27–24 | Horsens HK | Odense Idrætshal, Odense | 10 February 2001 |
| 38. | 2000/01 | Ikast-Bording EH (2) | 26–24 | Viborg HK | Århus Arena, Aarhus | 30 December 2001 |
| 39. | 2001/02 | Slagelse FH (1) | 38–36 (a.e.t.) | Ikast-Bording EH | Århus Arena, Aarhus | 29 December 2002 |
| 40. | 2002/03 | Viborg HK (4) | 30–28 | Ikast-Bording EH | Århus Arena, Aarhus | 27 December 2003 |
| 41. | 2003/04 | Horsens HK (1) | 23–20 | Ikast-Bording EH | Atletion, Aarhus | 29 December 2004 |
| 42. | 2004/05 | GOG Svendborg (6) | 30–28 | Viborg HK | Atletion, Aarhus | 30 December 2005 |
| 43. | 2005/06 | Viborg HK (5) | 27–24 | Slagelse FH | NRGi Arena, Aarhus | 30 December 2006 |
| 44. | 2006/07 | Viborg HK (6) | 27–21 | FCK Håndbold | NRGi Arena, Aarhus | 29 December 2007 |
| 45. | 2007/08 | Viborg HK (7) | 32–23 | KIF Vejen | NRGi Arena, Aarhus | 27 December 2008 |
| 46. | 2009 | FCK Håndbold (1) | 23–22 | SK Aarhus | NRGi Arena, Aarhus | 2 January 2010 |
| 47. | 2010 | Viborg HK (8) | 36–28 | Team Tvis Holstebro | NRGi Arena, Aarhus | 28 December 2010 |
| 48. | 2011 | Viborg HK (9) | 33–28 | Team Esbjerg | Arena Midt, Kjellerup | 7 January 2012 |
| 49. | 2012 | FC Midtjylland Håndbold (3) | 28–21 | KIF Vejen | Ikast-Brande Arena, Ikast | 29 December 2012 |
| 50. | 2013 | Viborg HK (10) | 26–21 | FC Midtjylland Håndbold | Jysk Arena, Silkeborg | 28 December 2013 |
| 51. | 2014 | FC Midtjylland Håndbold (4) | 32–26 | Team Tvis Holstebro | Jysk Arena, Silkeborg | 27 December 2014 |
| 52. | 2015 | FC Midtjylland Håndbold (5) | 28–26 (a.e.t.) | Viborg HK | Jysk Arena, Silkeborg | 27 December 2015 |
| 53. | 2016 | Randers HK (1) | 27–21 | FC Midtjylland Håndbold | Jysk Arena, Silkeborg | 30 December 2016 |
| 54. | 2017 | Team Esbjerg (1) | 31–20 | København Håndbold | Jysk Arena, Silkeborg | 30 December 2017 |
| 55. | 2018 | Nykøbing Falster Håndboldklub (1) | 28–26 | Odense Håndbold | Blue Water Dokken, Esbjerg | 30 December 2018 |
| 56. | 2019 | Herning-Ikast Håndbold (6) | 33–25 | Odense Håndbold | Gråkjær Arena, Holstebro | 29 December 2019 |
| 57. | 2020 | Odense Håndbold (1) | 32–26 | Nykøbing Falster Håndboldklub | Sydbank Arena, Odense | 6 June 2021 |
| 58. | 2021 | Team Esbjerg (2) | 32–21 | Odense Håndbold | Blue Water Dokken, Esbjerg | 27 February 2022 |
| 59. | 2022 | Team Esbjerg (3) | 33–22 | Odense Håndbold | Jysk Arena, Silkeborg | 2 April 2023 |
| 60. | 2023 | Team Esbjerg (4) | 36–26 | Nykøbing Falster Håndboldklub | Blue Water Dokken, Esjberg | 30 December 2023 |
| 61. | 2024 | Team Esbjerg (5) | 31–25 | Odense Håndbold | Jysk Arena, Silkeborg | 29 December 2024 |
| 62. | 2025 | Odense Håndbold (2) | 38–34 | Team Esbjerg | Jyske Bank Arena, Odense | 30 December 2025 |

=== Most valuable players ===
Since 1993, DHF has named an MVP (Danish: pokalfighter) following the cup final.

| Season | Player | Club |
|---|---|---|
| 1992/93 | (Denmark) Anette Hoffmann | Viborg HK |
| 1993/94 | (Denmark) Kristine Andersen | Ikast FS |
| 1994/95 | (Denmark) Natasja Dybmose | FIF |
| 1995/96 | (Denmark) Lise-Lotte Lauridsen | Frederikshavn fI |
| 1996/97 | (Denmark) Lise-Lotte Lauridsen | Frederikshavn fI |
| 1997/98 | (Denmark) Sara Hansen | Ikast FS |
| 1998/99 | (Sweden) Åsa Eriksson | Ikast-Bording EH |
| 1999/2000 | (Denmark) Conny Hamann-Boeriths | GOG Håndbold |
| 2000/01 | (Sweden) Kristina Jönsson | Ikast-Bording EH |
| 2001/02 | (Denmark) Mette Melgaard | Slagelse FH |
| 2002/03 | (Denmark) Katrine Fruelund | Viborg HK |
| 2003/04 | (Denmark) Jeanette Nielsen | Horsens HK |
| 2004/05 | (Denmark) Lene Lund Nielsen | Viborg HK |
| 2005/06 | (Denmark) Rikke Skov | Viborg HK |
| 2006/07 | (Denmark) Christina Pedersen | FCK Håndbold |
| 2007/08 | (Montenegro) Bojana Popović | Viborg HK |
| 2008/09 | (Denmark) Anna Sophie Okkels | SK Aarhus |
| 2009/10 | (Netherlands) Nycke Groot | Team Tvis Holstebro |
| 2010/11 | (Denmark) Lotte Grigel | Team Esbjerg |
| 2011/12 | (Netherlands) Nycke Groot | FC Midtjylland Håndbold |
| 2012/13 | (Denmark) Susan Thorsgaard | FC Midtjylland Håndbold |
| 2013/14 | (Netherlands) Nycke Groot | FC Midtjylland Håndbold |
| 2014/15 | (Denmark) Rikke Skov | Viborg HK |
| 2015/16 | (Denmark) Cecilie Greve | Randers HK |
| 2017 | (Sweden) Ulrika Toft Hansen | Team Esbjerg |
| 2018 | (Denmark) Mette Tranborg | Odense Håndbold |
| 2019 | (Germany) Sabine Englert | Herning-Ikast Håndbold |
| 2020 | (Netherlands) Lois Abbingh | Odense Håndbold |
| 2021 | (Denmark) Rikke Poulsen | Team Esbjerg |
| 2022 | (Denmark) Anna Kristensen | Team Esbjerg |
| 2023 | (Norway) Henny Reistad | Team Esbjerg |
| 2024 | (Norway) Henny Reistad | Team Esbjerg |
| 2025 | (Denmark) Elma Halilcevic | Odense Håndbold |

== Performances ==
Clubs listed in bold are currently playing in the 2019-20 season of the Danish Women's Handball League.

| Club | Winners | Runners-up | Winning years |
|---|---|---|---|
| FIF | 11 | 8 | 1964, 1965, 1967, 1969, 1970, 1972, 1973, 1981/82, 1984/85, 1994/95, 1996/97 |
| **Viborg HK** | 10 | 4 | 1992/93, 1993/94, 1995/96, 2002/03, 2005/06, 2006/07, 2007/08, 2010, 2011, 2013 |
| **Herning-Ikast Håndbold** (Note: also as Ikast-Bording EH and FC Midtjylland Håndbold) | 6 | 5 | 1998/99, 2000/01, 2012, 2014, 2015, 2019 |
| GOG Svendborg TGI (Note: also as GOG Håndbold) | 6 | 1 | 1988, 1988/89, 1991, 1991/92, 1999/2000, 2004/05 |
| **Team Esbjerg** | 5 | 2 | 2017, 2021, 2022, 2023, 2024 |
| IF AIA Tranbjerg | 4 | 2 | 1977, 1978/79, 1979/80, 1980/81 |
| Lyngså BK | 3 | 1 | 1985/86, 1986/87, 1987/88 |
| Ikast FS | 2 | 1 | 1989/90, 1997/98 |
| HG | 2 | 0 | 1966, 1974 |
| Svendborg HK | 2 | 0 | 1975, 1976 |
| **Odense Håndbold** | 2 | 5 | 2020, 2025 |
| **Nykøbing Falster Håndboldklub** | 1 | 2 | 2018 |
| FCK Håndbold | 1 | 1 | 2009 |
| Glostrup IC | 1 | 1 | 1968 |
| Helsingør IF | 1 | 1 | 1982/83 |
| **HH Elite** (Note: as Horsens HK) | 1 | 1 | 2003/04 |
| Slagelse FH | 1 | 1 | 2001/02 |
| Hørsholm-Usserød IK | 1 | 0 | 1971 |
| Nørlem/Nr. Nissum | 1 | 0 | 1983/84 |
| **Randers HK** | 1 | 0 | 2016 |
