= 2015 Carpathian Trophy =

47th edition of the Carpathian Trophy

- Official poster

Tournament details
- Host country: Romania
- Venue(s): 1 (in 1 host city)
- Dates: 20–21 March
- Teams: 4 (from 2 confederations)

Final positions
- Champions: Sweden (1st title)
- Runner-up: Romania
- Third place: Germany
- Fourth place: Brazil

Tournament statistics
- Matches played: 4
- Goals scored: 188 (47 per match)
- Attendance: 27,816 (6,954 per match)
- Top scorer(s): (Romania) Cristina Neagu (Brazil) Ana Paula Rodrigues (13 goals)

The 2015 Carpathian Trophy was the 47th edition of the Carpathian Trophy held in Cluj-Napoca, Romania between 20–21 March as a women's friendly handball tournament organised by the Romanian Handball Federation.

The most recent winners of the World Championship (Brazil) and the most recent bronze medalists of the European Championship (Sweden) appeared in the competition.

== Participants ==
- Romania (hosts)
- Brazil
- Germany
- Sweden

== Knockout stage (place 1-4) ==
=== Bracket ===
==== Semifinals ====
20 March 2015
18:00
Sweden
33–32 (ET)
Germany
Sala Polivalentă, Cluj-Napoca
Attendance: 6,000
Referees: Florescu, Stoia (ROU)
Blohm 7
(11–12)
Minevskaja 6

Report

FT: 27–27 ET: 6–5

20 March 2015; 20:00	Romania	27–19	Brazil	Sala Polivalentă, Cluj-Napoca; Attendance: 7,200; Referees: Antić, Jakovljević (SRB)
20 March 2015; 20:00	Nechita 7	(13–9)	Rodrigues-Belo 6	Sala Polivalentă, Cluj-Napoca; Attendance: 7,200; Referees: Antić, Jakovljević (SRB)
20 March 2015; 20:00		Report		Sala Polivalentă, Cluj-Napoca; Attendance: 7,200; Referees: Antić, Jakovljević (SRB)

==== Third place game ====
21 March 2015; 18:30	Germany	25–20	Brazil	Sala Polivalentă, Cluj-Napoca; Attendance: 7,308; Referees: Florescu, Stoia (ROU)
21 March 2015; 18:30	Minevskaja, Naidzinavicius 5	(12–9)	Rodrigues-Belo 7	Sala Polivalentă, Cluj-Napoca; Attendance: 7,308; Referees: Florescu, Stoia (ROU)
21 March 2015; 18:30		Report		Sala Polivalentă, Cluj-Napoca; Attendance: 7,308; Referees: Florescu, Stoia (ROU)

==== Final ====
21 March 2015; 20:15	Sweden	26–17	Romania	Sala Polivalentă, Cluj-Napoca; Attendance: 7,308; Referees: Antić, Jakovljević (SRB)
21 March 2015; 20:15	Torstenson 4	(14–6)	Neagu 7	Sala Polivalentă, Cluj-Napoca; Attendance: 7,308; Referees: Antić, Jakovljević (SRB)
21 March 2015; 20:15		Report		Sala Polivalentă, Cluj-Napoca; Attendance: 7,308; Referees: Antić, Jakovljević (SRB)

== Statistics ==
2015 Carpathian Trophy Champions

Sweden
First title

Team roster: Johanna Bundsen, Linn Blohm, Jamina Roberts, Louise Sand, Filippa Idéhn, Johanna Ahlm, Linnea Torstenson, Nathalie Hagman, Sabina Jacobsen, Ida Odén, Anna-Maria Johansson, Angelica Wallén, Johanna Westberg, Frida Tegstedt, Michaela Ek, Edijana Dafe.
Head coach: Tomas Sivertsson / Helle Thomsen.

=== Final ranking ===
Gold medal	Sweden
Silver medal	Romania
Bronze medal	Germany
4	Brazil
