= Frida Tegstedt =

Swedish handball player (born 1987)

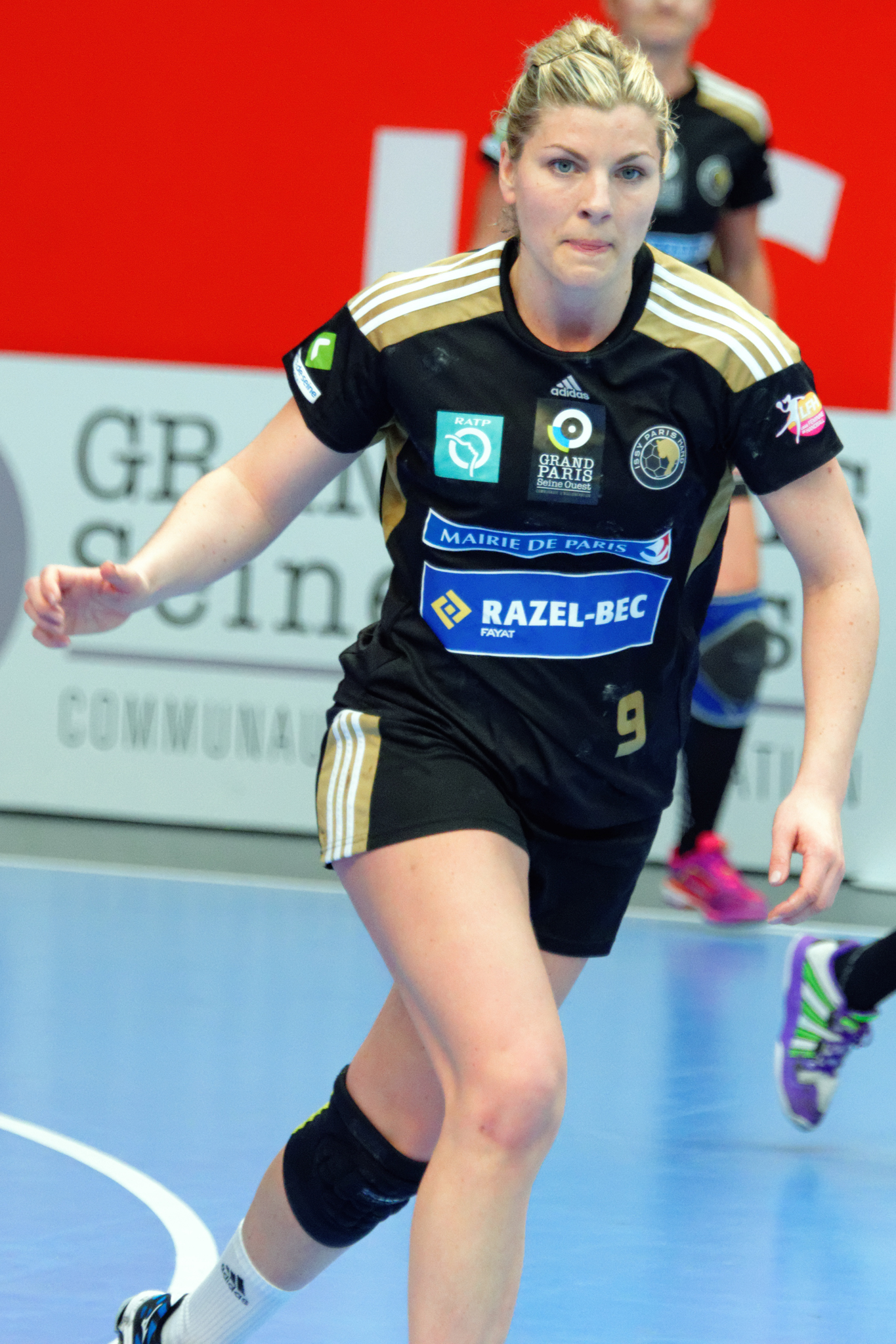

Personal information
- Nationality: Swedish
- Born: 17 July 1987 (age 39) Gothenburg, Sweden
- Height: 1.80 m (5 ft 11 in)

Sport
- Sport: Handball
- Position: Pivot
- Current club: Retired

Senior clubs
- Years: Team
- 2005–2014: IK Sävehof
- 2014–2016: Füchse Berlin
- 2016–2017: Issy-Paris Hand
- 2019: Önnereds HK
National team
Years	Team	Apps	(Gls)
2013–2016	Sweden	51	(43)

Frida Tegstedt (born 17 July 1987) is a Swedish female retired handballer who played as a pivot. She played for Issy-Paris Hand in France, Füchse Berlin in Germany and IK Sävehof in her home country. She also played for the Swedish national team. She retired in 2017.

== Career ==
She debuted for the senior team of IK Sävehof in the Spring of 2005 against Skånela IF. With the club she won 8 Swedish championships.

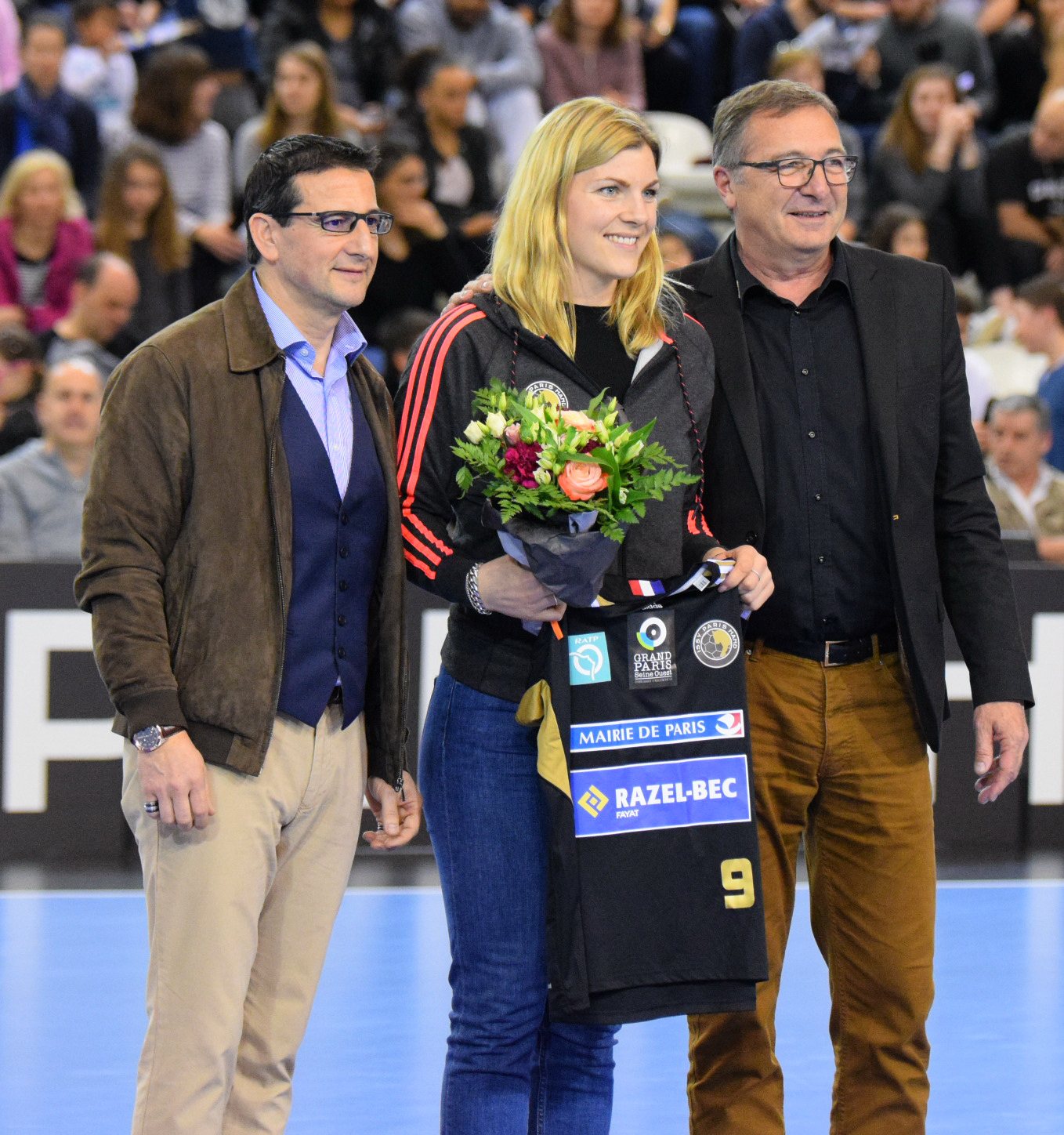
On April 3, 2016 when she was introduced to the fans of her new team Issy Paris Hand.

In 2014 she moved to Germany to join Füchse Berlin, since her partner at the time Jesper Nielsen became a professional handballer in Germany.

Two years later she joined French club Issy Paris Hand, since Jesper Nielsen at the same time joined PSG. In the fall of 2019 she made a short comeback for Önnereds HK.

She debuted for the Swedish national team in 2013 at the age of 28. She represented Sweden at the 2025 World Women's Handball Championship and the 2016 Olympics.

== Achievements ==
- Swedish Championship:
  - Gold Medalist: 2007, 2009, 2010, 2011, 2012, 2013, 2014
- Carpathian Trophy:
  - Winner: 2015
