= Nordvestjysk Elite =

Danish handball club

- Full name: Nordvestjysk Elite
- Founded: April 14, 2020; 6 years ago
- Arena: Gråkjær Arena
- Capacity: 3,250
- CEO: Morten Villadsen
- Head coach: Kasper Andersen
- League: Danish 1st Division
- 2026-27: 1st (Promotion)
Home	Away

Nordvestjysk Elite is a women's handball club in the Damehåndboldligaen from Holstebro, Denmark. Their home matches are played in Gråkjær Arena.

Location of Holstebro Håndbold

== History ==
Previously, the women's team was part of TTH Holstebro. TTH decided to split up the men's and women's section in each club, due to the COVID-19 pandemic. HH90 took over the women's section and became Holstebro Håndbold, while the men's team stayed in TTH Holstebro. The team overtook TTH's license and thus started in the top flight. The new club name Holstebro Håndbold, was announced on 14 April 2020. It was originally planned that the team should play their home matches at Idrætscenter Vest, but last minute the team decided to use Gråkjær Arena instead, as it had better facilities for spectators and sponsors.

In the 2021-22 season they were relegated to the 1st Division after finishing last in the regular season. In 2025-26 the team was promoted to the top division again.

In May 2026 the club decided to change their name to Nordvestjysk Elite to better represent the entire region.

== Results ==
=== TTH Holstebro ===
- Danish Women's Handball League:
  - Silver Medalist: 2013
  - Bronze Medalist: 2015, 2016
- Women's EHF Cup: 2
  - Winner: 2013, 2015
  - Silver Medalist: 2011
- Women's EHF Cup Winners' Cup: 1
  - Winner: 2016

== Kits ==
HOME
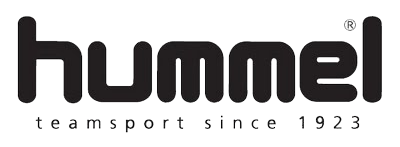
2020-21

== Team ==
=== Current squad ===
Squad for the 2026–27 season

Goalkeepers

- 1 (Denmark) Josefine Mahler (on loan at (Denmark) Bjerringbro FH)
- 12 (Sweden) Stina Littorin
- 31 (Denmark) Isabella Mathorne

Wingers
LW

- 9 (Denmark) Josefine Kaae Larsen

RW

- 22 (Denmark) Simone Juel Kristensen
- 23 (Norway) Hedda Lauvås Aasen

Line players

- 2 (Norway) Emma Holtet
- 6 (Denmark) Christina Hansen
- 20 (France) Maëlle Faynel

Back players
LB

- 7 (Denmark) Cecilia Hovgaard
- 8 (Sweden) Elma Örtemark
- 13 (Denmark) Sofie Schelde-Rasmussen
- 28 (Denmark) Anne Katrine Nowak

CB

- 3 (Denmark) Nicoline Sax
- 10 (Norway) Julie Bøe Jacobsen
- 17 (Sweden) Emma Wahlström

RB

- 33 (Denmark) Nanna Skovmose Vinther

=== Technical staff ===
- (Denmark) Sporting Director Henrik Okkerstrøm
- (Denmark) Head Coach: Kasper Andersen
- (Denmark) Assistant Coach Henrik Okkerstrøm
- (Denmark) Goalkeeping Coach Michael Christiansen
- (Denmark) Physical Trainer: Kim Magnussen
- (Denmark) Physiotherapist: Ole Aggerholm
- (Denmark) Physiotherapist: Simon Petersen
- (Denmark) Physiotherapist: Emma Lyholm
- (Denmark) Team Leader: Lotte Myre
- (Denmark) Team Leader: Dorthe Pilgaard

=== Transfers ===
Transfers for the 2026-27 season

Joining

- (Denmark) Isabella Mathorne (GK) (from (Denmark) Skanderborg Håndbold)
- (Sweden) Stina Littorin (GK) (from (Sweden) Önnereds HK)
- (Sweden) Elma Örtemark (LB) (from (Denmark) Viborg HK)
- (Denmark) Anne Katrine Nowak (LB) (from (Denmark) Ikast Håndbold U19)
- (Sweden) Emma Wahlström (CB) (from (Denmark) HH Elite)
- (Norway) Julie Bøe Jacobsen (CB) (from (Norway) Molde Elite)
- (Norway) Hedda Lauvås Aasen (RW) (from (Norway) Byåsen HE)
- (Norway) Emma Holtet (P) (from (Norway) Tertnes HE)
- (France) Maëlle Faynel (P) (from (France) Chambray Touraine Handball)

Leaving

- (Denmark) Natasha Schibler (GK) (to (Denmark) Bjerringbro FH)
- (Kosovo) Leonora Demaj (LB) (to ?)
- (Denmark) Ea Munch Jørgensen (LB) (to Voel HK)
- (Montenegro) Ilda Kepić (LB) (to (Denmark) SIK Viborg)
- (Iceland) Katla María Magnúsdóttir (LB) (to (Iceland) Valur)
- (Denmark) Frederikke Waage-Jensen (RW) (to (Denmark) Bjerringbro FH)
- (Denmark) Emma Skipper (P) (to (Denmark) Aarhus Håndbold)
- (Denmark) Mathilde Dalum Hansen (P) (to ?)
- (Denmark) Lærke Hauge Jensen (P) (to ?)

- (Denmark) Josefine Mahler (GK) (on loan to (Denmark) Bjerringbro FH)
- (Denmark) Mille Lebech (LW) (to ?)

=== Transfer history ===
Transfers for the 2025–26 season

Joining

- (Denmark) Josefine Kaae Larsen (LW) (from (Denmark) Skanderborg Håndbold)
- (Denmark) Mille Lebech (LW) (from (Denmark) Skanderborg Håndbold U19)
- (Montenegro) Ilda Kepić (LB) (from (Denmark) Viborg HK)
- (Iceland) Katla María Magnúsdóttir (LB) (from (Iceland) UMF Selfoss)
- (Denmark) Nicoline Sax (CB) (from (Denmark) Aarhus Håndbold)
- (Denmark) Nanna Skovmose Vinther (RB) (from (Denmark) Viborg HK)
- (Denmark) Frederikke Waage-Jensen (RW) (from (Denmark) Aarhus Håndbold)
- (Denmark) Simone Juel Kristensen (RW) (from (Denmark) Ikast Håndbold U19)
- (Denmark) Christina Hansen (P) (from (Denmark) Skanderborg Håndbold)
- (Denmark) Lærke Hauge Jensen (P) (from (Denmark) Ikast Håndbold U19)

- (Denmark) Ea Munch Jørgensen (LB) (from (Denmark) EH Aalborg) (With immediate effect 1 January 2026)

Leaving

- (Denmark) Julie Bjerregaard (LW) (to (Denmark) Skanderborg Håndbold)
- (Denmark) Nathalie Rasmussen (LW) (to ?)
- (Denmark) Mathilde Høy Troelsen (LB) (to (Denmark) Skanderborg Håndbold)
- (Denmark) Tea Thomassen Hein (CB) (to (Denmark) HH Elite)
- (Denmark) Mathilde Hylleberg (RB) (break from handball)
- (Denmark) Cecilie Specht (RB) (to (Denmark) Skanderborg Håndbold)
- (Denmark) Julie Højberg Rasmussen (RW) (to (Denmark) Søndermarkens IK)
- (Denmark) Mia Lægsgaard Degn (RW) (to ?)
- (Denmark) Nanna Løvig Rasmussen (P) (break from handball)

=== Notable former players ===
- (Denmark) Rikke Poulsen (2004–2007)
- (Denmark) Sandra Toft (2007–2014)
- (Denmark) Kristina Kristiansen (2007–2015)
- (Denmark) Mette Gravholt (2010–2014)
- (Denmark) Ann Grete Nørgaard (2010–2015)
- (Denmark) Louise Burgaard (2011–2013)
- (Denmark) Kathrine Heindahl (2011–2013)
- (Denmark) Lærke Nolsøe (2013–2016)
- (Denmark) Lærke Møller (2014–2016)
- (Denmark) Sara Hald (2014–2018)
- (Denmark) Ida Vium (2014–2018)
- (Denmark) Annette Jensen (2015–2018)
- (Denmark) Line Mai Hougaard (2015–2018)
- (Denmark) Mathilde Hylleberg (2015–2020) (2021) (2022–2025)
- (Denmark) Kaja Kamp (2018–2020)
- (Denmark) Nikoline Lundgreen (2018–2020)
- (Denmark) Lærke Christensen (2018–2022)
- (Denmark) Maria Mose Vestergaard (2019–2020)
- (Denmark) Josefine Dragenberg (2020–2022)
- (Denmark) Tea Thomassen Hein (2020–2025)
- (Denmark) Julie Gantzel Pedersen (2021–2022)
- (Denmark) Anne Christine Bossen (2021–2022)
- (Denmark) Emilie Holst Firgaard (2022–2024)

- (Netherlands) Ingeborg Huisken–Vlietstra (2002–2003)
- (Netherlands) Mariska Schenkel (2003–2003)
- (Netherlands) Birgit van Os (2004–2008)
- (Netherlands) Andrea Groot (2005–2007)
- (Netherlands) Debbie Klijn (2006–2006)
- (Netherlands) Nycke Groot (2006–2011)
- (Netherlands) Inger Smits (2017–2019)
- (Netherlands) Lynn Knippenborg (2018–2019)
- (Netherlands) Jesse van de Polder (2022–2024)
- (Netherlands) Evi Jaspers (2022–2024)

- (Iceland) Hrafnhildur Skúladóttir (2002–2004)
- (Iceland) Kristín Guðmundsdóttir (2003–2004)
- (Iceland) Helga Torfadottir (2003–2004)
- (Iceland) Inga Frida Tryggvadóttir (2003–2004)
- (Iceland) Hanna Guðrún Stefánsdóttir (2003–2004)
- (Iceland) Dagný Skúladóttir (2006–2007)
- (Iceland) Rut Arnfjörð Jónsdóttir (2008–2014)
- (Iceland) Þórey Rósa Stefánsdóttir (2011–2013)
- (Iceland) Auður Waagfjörð Jónsdóttir (2012–2014)
- (Iceland) Berta Rut Harðardóttir (2022–2023)

- (Sweden) Jenny Gustafsson (2010–2011)
- (Sweden) Lynn Blohm (2014–2016)
- (Sweden) Nathalie Hagman (2014–2016)
- (Sweden) Jamina Roberts (2014–2016)
- (Sweden) Maja Eriksson (2016–2018)
- (Sweden) Jenny Carlson (2020–2022)
- (Sweden) Elin Irene Karlsson (2022–2023)

- (Norway) Ida Alstad (2013–2014)
- (Norway) Silje Solberg (2014–2016)
- (Norway) Camilla Herrem (2015–2016)
- (Norway) Hege Bakken Wahlquist (2016–2017)
- (Norway) Pia Gundersen (2020–2020)

- (Germany) Anna Loerper (2011–2013)
- (Germany) Kim Hinkelmann (2022–2023)

- (South Korea) Lee Sang-Eun (2002–2003)

- (Japan) Aiko Hayafune (2006–2007)

- (Poland) Iwona Niedźwiedź (2011–2013)

- (Brazil) Karolina de Souza (2013–2024)

- (Montenegro) Ilda Kepic (2018–2020) (2025–)

- (Turkey) Sara Kececi (2018–2022)

- (Kosovo) Leonora Demaj (2024–2026)
