= Åsa Mogensen =

Swedish handball player (born 1972)

Personal information
- Full name: Åsa Elisabeth Mogensen
- Nationality: Swedish
- Born: 21 June 1972 (age 54) Sweden

Sport
- Sport: Handball
- Position: Back

Senior clubs
- Years: Team
- 1990–1992: Skånela IF
- 1992–1993: Larvik HK
- 1993–1996: Sävsjö HK
- 1996–2001: Ikast-Bording EH
- 2001–2002: BM Remudas
- 2002–2005: Horsens HK
- 2005: Ikast-Bording EH
- 2006: Levanger HK
National team
Years	Team	Apps	(Gls)
1990–2005	Sweden	251	(1087)

Teams managed
- 2005–2007: Horsens HK Youth
- 2007: Hadsten SK Assistant
- 2007–2009: Ikast-Bording EH Youth

Åsa Elisabeth Mogensen (born 21 June 1972 as Åsa Eriksson) is a Swedish former handball player. She is the player with most caps (251) for the Sweden women's handball team and she scored 1087 goals for the Swedish national team.

In the 1993-94 and 1994-95 seasons, she was the Swedish league topscorer.

She won the Danish Cup in 1999, where she was also named tournament MVP.

After her playing career, she has worked as a coach at various Danish clubs.

== Achievements ==
- EHF City Cup: 1997/98
- Swedish League: 1992, 1994, 1995 and 1996
- Danish League: 1998
- Danish Cup: 1999, 2000 and 2005

== See also ==
- List of women's handballers with 1000 or more international goals
