= Anna-Maria Johansson =

Swedish handball player (born 1982)

Personal information
- Nationality: Swedish
- Born: 15 February 1982 (age 44) Glava, Sweden
- Height: 1.84 m (6 ft 0 in)

Sport
- Sport: Handball
- Position: Right back
- Current club: Retired

Youth career
- Years: Team
- 1993-1996: Skåre HK
- 1996-2001: IF Hellton

Senior clubs
- Years: Team
- 2001-2003: IFK Örebro
- 2003-2008: Skövde HF
- 2008-2009: Fox Team Nord
- 2009-2011: Team Esbjerg
- 2011-2016: Skövde HF
National team
Years	Team	Apps	(Gls)
2009-2015	Sweden	87	(178)
Medal record
European Championship
Silver medal – second place	2010 Denmark/Norway
Bronze medal – third place	2014 Croatia/Hungary

Anna-Maria Johansson (born 15 February 1982) is a Swedish former handball player, who played the Swedish women's national handball team.

At the 2010 European Women's Handball Championship she reached the finals and won a silver medal with the Swedish team.

== Achievements ==
- Carpathian Trophy:
  - Winner: 2015
