= Emma Wahlström =

Swedish handball player (born 2002)

Personal information
- Full name: Emma Wahlström
- Nationality: Swedish
- Born: 8 May 2000 (age 26) Skövde, Sweden
- Height: 1.70 m (5 ft 7 in)

Sport
- Sport: Handball
- Position: Centre back
- Current club: Nordvestjysk Elite
- Number: 9

Youth career
- Years: Team
- 2017–2018: Skövde HF

Senior clubs
- Years: Team
- 2017–2019: Skövde HF
- 2019–2025: IF Hallby
- 2025–2026: HH Elite
- 2026–: Nordvestjysk Elite
National team
Years	Team	Apps	(Gls)
2026-	Sweden	1	(3)
- Updated on 3 September 2026

Emma Wahlström (born 8 May 2000) is a Swedish handballer for Nordvestjysk Elite in the Danish Women's Handball League and the Swedish national team.

She made her debut on the Swedish national team on 13 April 2025, against Kosovo. Wahlström was also part of the extended squad for the 2025 World Women's Handball Championship in Netherlands and Germany. She did however not play a single match.

On 8 April 2026, it was announced that Wahlström had signed a two-year contract with Nordvestjysk Elite. She has also played in IF Hallby for six seasons and Skövde HF in Handbollsligan. She signed with HH Elite for thr 2025–26 season. A year later she signed for league rivals Nordvestjysk Elite.
