= Alexandra Bjärrenholt =

Swedish handball player (born 1993)

Personal information
- Full name: Alexandra Bjärrenholt
- Nationality: Swedish
- Born: 19 February 1993 (age 33) Norrtälje, Sweden
- Height: 1.72 m (5 ft 8 in)

Sport
- Sport: Handball
- Position: Back player
- Current club: Skuru IK
- Number: 4

Senior clubs
- Years: Team
- 2011–2016: VästeråsIrsta HF
- 2016–: Skuru IK
National team
Years	Team	Apps	(Gls)
2018–	Sweden	11	(9)

Alexandra Bjärrenholt (born 19 February 1993) is a Swedish handballer for Skuru IK and the Swedish national team.

She made her debut on the Swedish national team on 15 June 2018.

== Achievements ==
- SHE:
  - Gold Medalist: 2021
  - Silver Medalist: 2013, 2014, 2015, 2016, 2019
- Swedish Handball Cup:
  - Gold Medalist: 2022
