= List of Swedish handball champions =

List of Swedish handball champions may refer to:

- List of Swedish men's handball champions
- List of Swedish women's handball champions
