= Skuru IK (women's handball) =

Swedish handball club

Skuru IK Handboll
- Full name: Skuru Idrottsklubb Handboll
- Short name: Skuru
- Founded: 1950; 76 years ago
- Arena: Nacka Bollhall
- Capacity: 460
- President: Barbro Carlsson
- Head Coach: Magnus Oscarsson Söder
- League: Handbollsligan
- 2025–26: 8th
- Club colours
Home	Away

Skuru IK Handboll is a women's handball team based in Nacka, Sweden, that competes in Handbollsligan. They play their home matches in Nacka Bollhall, which have capacity for 460 spectators. They play in green shirts and green shorts.

Location of Skuru IK

== History ==
The multisports club was founded in 1922, and the handball department was added in 1950. Their home court, Nacka Sporthall, was built in 1963. In 1986 the women's team was promoted to the top league for the first time. In 1988 they reached the Swedish Championship final for the first time, but lost to Tyresö HF. During the 1990s the men's team also had their best period, when they played in the Division 1.

In 2001 they won their first Swedish Championship, beating Stårvägen in the semifinal and IK Sävehof in the final. In 2004 they won their second title, when they beat Team Eslövs IK in extra time. The year after they won the title again, beating Skövde HF in the final 24–23. The final ended in dramatic fashion, when Skövde had a last-second penalty throw, which goalkeeper Patricia Löfberg saved.

Then it would be nine years before they reached the final again. In 2014 they lost the final to IK Sävehof 20–38. They reached the final again in 2015 and 2019, but lost on both occasions to IK Sävehof. In 2021 they won their fourth title, beating H 65 Höör in the final.

== Kits ==
HOME
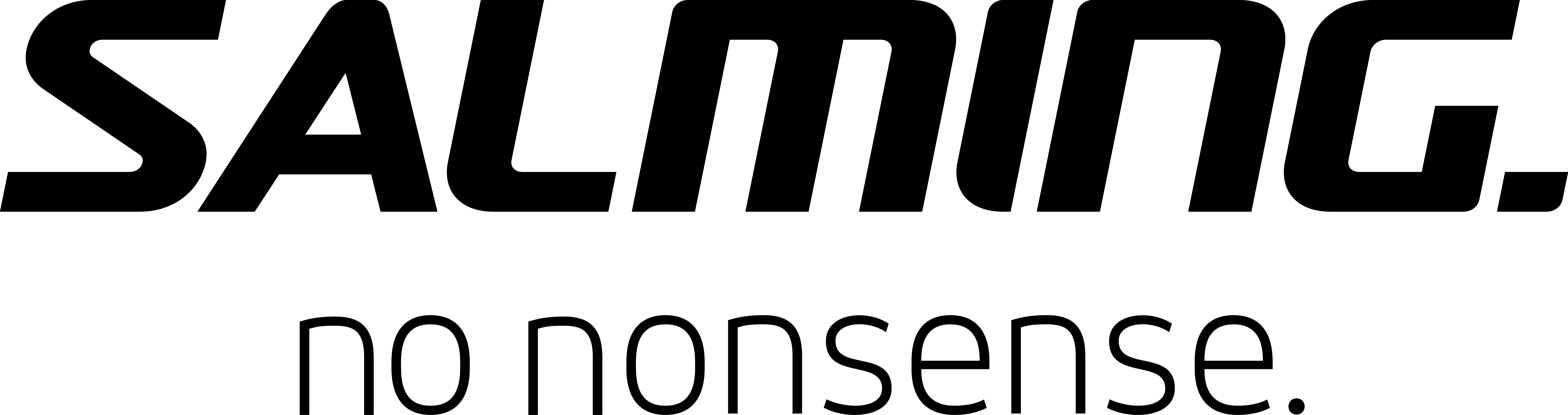
2018-19

AWAY
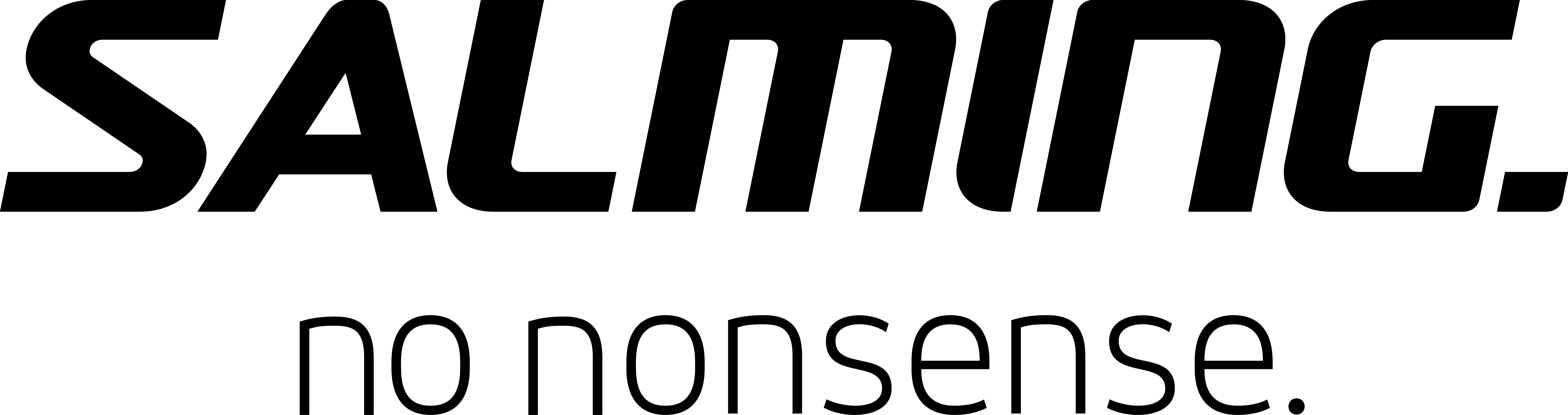
2015-16

== Honours ==
- SHE Women:
  - Gold: 2001, 2004, 2005, 2021
  - Silver: 2013, 2014, 2015, 2016, 2019, 2022
- Swedish Cup:
  - Gold: 2022

== Arena ==
- Arena: Nacka Bollhall
- City: Nacka
- Capacity: 460
- Address: Griffelvägen 11, 131 40 Nacka

== Team ==
=== Current squad ===
Squad for the 2026–27 season

Goalkeepers

- 1 (Faroe Islands) Gylta Djurhuus á Neystabø
- 12 (Denmark) Anne Sofia Guldager Lauridsen

Wingers
LW

- 10 (Sweden) Michelle Holgersson
- 26 (Norway) Karen Forseth
- 32 (Sweden) Amalia Yilkangas

RW

- 14 (Sweden) Elin Cindric
- 33 (Sweden) Isabella Herlitz

Line players

- 5 (Denmark) Julie Molbech Andersen
- 9 (Sweden) Alice Salmi
- 13 (Sweden) Alice SalmiMoa Magnusson

Back players
LB

- 15 (Sweden) Emilia Siggberg
- 16 (Sweden) Ulrika Landé
- 27 (Sweden) Emma Aarnio

CB

- 4 (Sweden) Alexandra Bjärrenholt
- 7 (Norway) Emma Eikrem Klauset
- 25 (Sweden) Ania Rigole
- 30 (Sweden) Ida Boström

RB

- 23 (Sweden) Anna Lehtinen

=== Technical staff ===
- (Sweden) Head Coach: Magnus Oscarsson Söder
- (Sweden) Assistant coach: Calle Tagesson
- (Sweden) Goalkeeping coach: Thomas Forsberg
- (Sweden) Team Leader: Tatti Henryson
- (Sweden) Team Leader: Johan Östlund
- (Sweden) Team Leader: Mats Niklasson

=== Transfers ===
Transfers for the 2027–28 season

Joining

Leaving

== Notable former players ==
- (Sweden) Katarina Arfwidsson
- (Sweden) Nathalie Hagman
- (Sweden) Theresa Brosson
- (Sweden) Carin Strömberg
- (Sweden) Anna Rapp
- (Sweden) Therese Islas Helgesson
- (Sweden) Johanna Westberg
- (Sweden) Mathilda Lundström
- (Sweden) Evelina Eriksson
- (Sweden) Daniela de Jong
- (Sweden) Elin Hansson
- (Sweden) Vilma Matthijs Holmberg
- (Iceland) Eva Björk Davíðsdóttir
