= Idrætscenter Vest =

Indoor sports arena in Holstebro, Denmark

Coordinates: 56°23′23″N 8°34′41″E

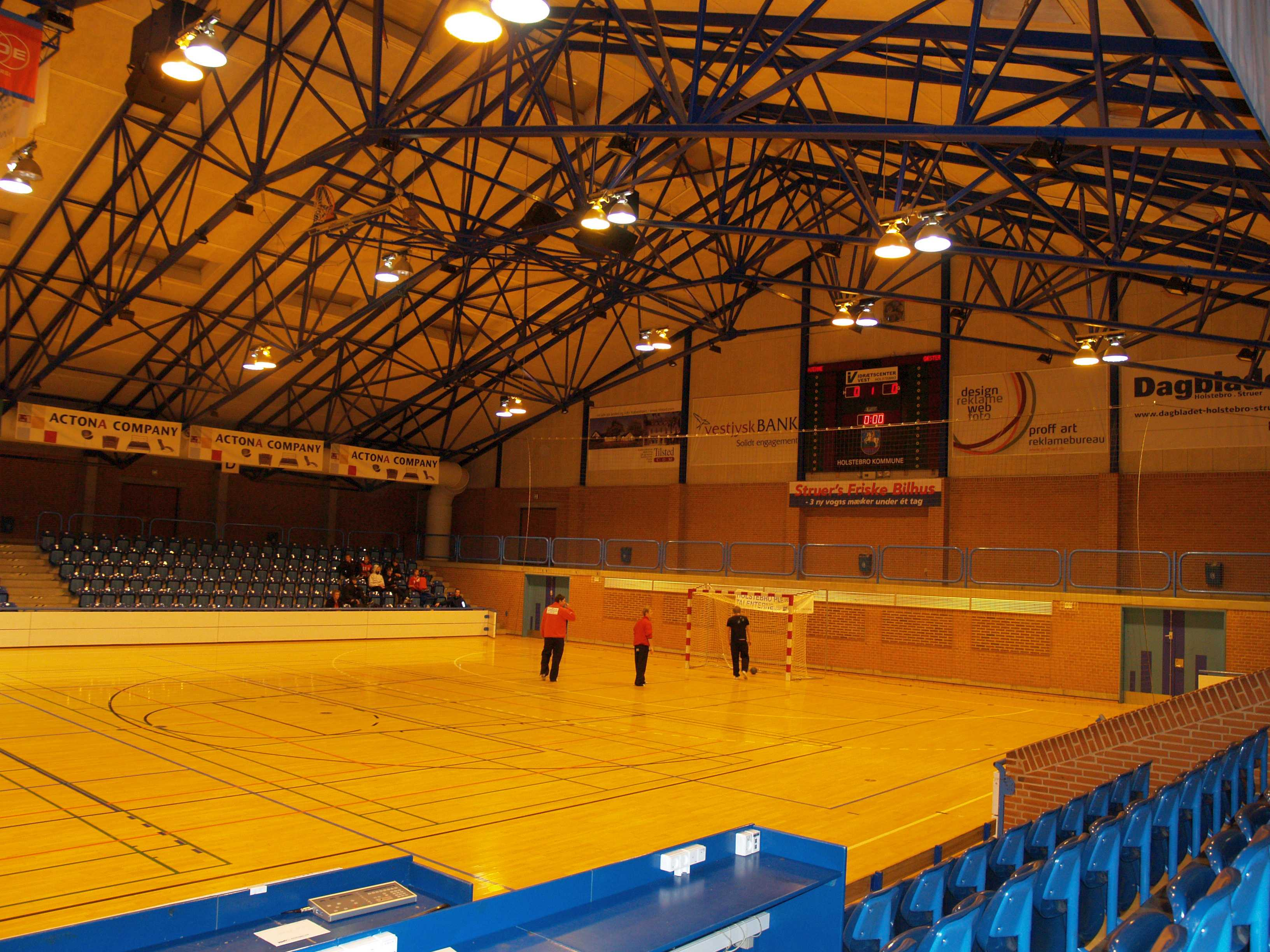
Idrætscenter Vest

Idrætscenter Vest is an indoor sports arena in Holstebro, Denmark primarily used for handball, but also for gymnastics, karate, soccer and archery. The arena can hold 2,300 spectators (app. 1000 seated) and was the former home to Danish Handball League side Team Tvis Holstebro, before they moved to Gråkjær Arena.

It was originally planned that the women's team Holstebro Håndbold should play their home matches at Idrætscenter Vest, when the team was formed in 2020. Last minute they chose to play at Gråkjær Arena, as it had better facilities for spectators and sponsors.
