= Dafe (name) =

Dafe is a name which may refer to:

- Edijana Dafe (born 27 May 1990) is a former Swedish female handballer
- Falimery Dafé Ramanamahefa (born 22 November 1991) is a Malagasy professional footballer .
