= Kristina Jönsson =

Swedish handball player (born 1969)

Personal information
- Full name: Hilda Kristina Jönsson
- Nationality: Swedish
- Born: 13 May 1969 (age 57) Ljungsarps församling, Sweden

Sport
- Sport: Handball
- Position: Goalkeeper
- Current club: Retired

Youth career
- Years: Team
- –1989: Sävsjö HK

Senior clubs
- Years: Team
- 1989–1997: Sävsjö HK
- 1997–2002: Ikast Bording EH
National team
Years	Team	Apps	(Gls)
1989–1999	Sweden	183	(2)

Hilda Kristina Jönsson (born 13 May 1969) is a Swedish former handball goalkeeper. She was named Swedish Handballer of the year twice, in 1992 and 1996.

== Career ==
Kristina Jönsson grew up in Vällersten, outside Värnamo. She played the majority of her career for Sävsjö HK. In 1989 the club was promoted to the Elitserien, and afterwards they reached the play-offs 4 years in a row. In 1994 they won their first Swedish Championship. Afterwards she won 3 more Swedish Championships in a row. She then joined Danish side Ikast Bording EH, where she played until 2002. Here she won the Danish Championship in 1997-98 and the Danish Cup in 2001, where she was also named tournament MVP. She retired in 2001, but due to an injury for Ikast-Bording's starting goalkeeper, Jenny Holmgren, in December 2001 she decided to unretire to help her former team.

Jönsson made her debut for the Swedish national team in 1989. During her 11-year tenure, she was most often the starting goalkeeper and played 182 matches for the Swedish national team, more than any other goalkeeper.
