= Stina Littorin =

Swedish handball player (born 2002)

Personal information
- Full name: Stina Ingrid Linnea Littorin
- Nationality: Swedish
- Born: 23 March 2005 (age 21) Gothenburg, Sweden
- Height: 1.81 m (5 ft 11 in)

Sport
- Sport: Handball
- Position: Goalkeeper
- Current club: Nordvestjysk Elite
- Number: 16

Youth career
- Years: Team
- 2020-2025: Kärra HF

Senior clubs
- Years: Team
- 2025–2026: Önnereds HK
- 2026–: Nordvestjysk Elite
National team
Years	Team	Apps	(Gls)
2026–	Sweden	2	(0)

Stina Ingrid Linnea Littorin (born 23 March 2005) is a Swedish handballer for Nordvestjysk Elite in Danish Women's Handball League and the Swedish national team. She previously played for Önnereds HK.

She made her debut on the Swedish national team on 7 March 2026, against Serbia.

On 30 June 2026, it was announced that Littorin had signed a three-year contract with Nordvestjysk Elite.

She represented Sweden at the 2024 IHF Women's U20 Handball World Championship in North Macedonia, placing 6th.

== Achievements ==
- Handbollsligan
  - Best Goalkeeper of the Season: 2025–26
