= Matilda Boson =

Swedish handball player (born 1981)

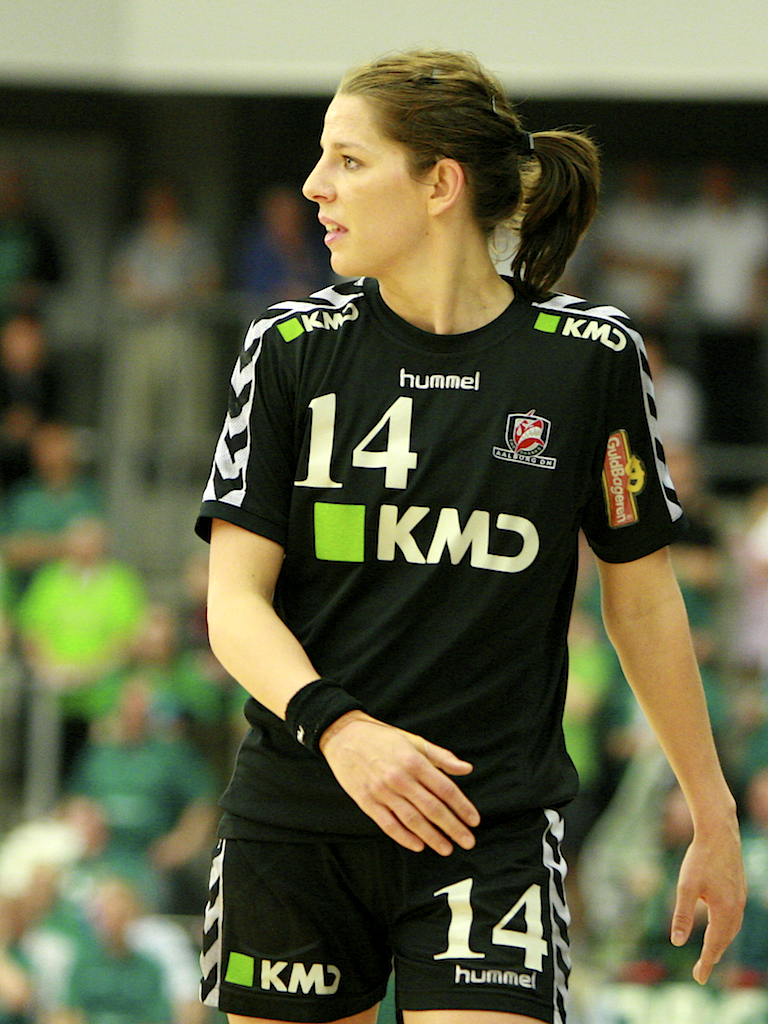
- Matilda Boson

Personal information
- Full name: Matilda Linnéa Boson
- Nationality: Swedish
- Born: 4 December 1981 (age 44) Nacka, Sweden
- Height: 1.76 m (5 ft 9 in)

Sport
- Sport: Handball
- Position: Right Wing
- Current club: Retired

Youth career
- Years: Team
- –: Malmslätts AIK

Senior clubs
- Years: Team
- -2000: RP IF
- 2000-2002: Skövde HF
- 2002-2005: FCK Håndbold (Denmark)
- 2005-2010: Aalborg DH (Denmark)
- 2010-2012: Spårvägens HF
National team
Years	Team	Apps	(Gls)
2000-2012	Sweden	210	(515)
Medal record
European Championship
Silver medal – second place	2010 Denmark/Norway	Team

Matilda Linnéa Boson (born 4 December 1981) is a Swedish former handball player who played for the Sweden women's national handball team. She participated in the 2008 Summer Olympics in Beijing, where Sweden finished eighth. She was also part of the Swedish team at the 2012 Summer Olympics.

As a senior player, she primarily played as a right wing, although she had played in the back positions until around age 18 and was occasionally used in those positions throughout her career.
