= Michaela Ek =

Swedish handball player (born 1988)

Personal information
- Nationality: Swedish
- Born: 1 February 1988 (age 38) Skövde, Sweden
- Height: 1.74 m (5 ft 9 in)

Sport
- Sport: Handball
- Position: Right wing
- Current club: Skövde HF
- Number: 23

Senior clubs
- Years: Team
- 2007–2015: Skövde HF
- 2015–2016: Silkeborg-Voel KFUM
- 2016–2017: Ringkøbing
- 2018–2019: TIF Viking
- 2025–: Skövde HF
National team
Years	Team	Apps	(Gls)
2015–2016	Sweden	13	(10)

Michaela Ek (born 1 February 1988) is a Swedish female handballer who plays for Skövde HF and has represented the Swedish national team.

== Career ==
Michaela Ek begun to play handball in Skövde HF when she was a child. She made her debut in the A-team in 2007 and has played there for 8 seasons when she signed a professional contract with Bjeringbro-Silkeborg in Denmark in February. During her years in Skövde, she had scored over 500 goals until February 2015. Michaela Ek stayed only one year in Bjerringbro-Silkeborg and then signed for Ringkøbing. In March 2017, the club announced that Michaela Ek was pregnant and this season no longer will play in Ringköping. At the end of the season, it was clear that she would not continue in Ringköping. In May 2018, it became clear that Ek's career continues in TIF Viking in Norway. Her partner Kasper Gudnitz will play for Fyllingen and Ek will play for Bergenklubben's TIF Viking in division 1. She played for Viking until spring 2019.

The national team debut took place in the Carpathi Cup. The Swedish national team won the cup. When Emma Hawia Svensson injured her cruciate ligament in the SM final in 2016, Michaela Ek became a championship debutant in the Olympics in Rio 2016. Michaela Ek was injured in the Olympic tournament. She was replaced in the quarter-finals against Hanna Blomstrand. Michaela Ek played 13 international matches in 2015-2016.

== International honours ==
- Carpathian Trophy:
  - Winner: 2015
