= Sara Johansson =

Sara Johansson may refer to:

- Sara Johansson (footballer)
- Sara Johansson (handballer)
