= Gunilla Olsson (handballer) =

Swedish handball player (born 1969)

Personal information
- Full name: Gunilla Olsson Friberg
- Nationality: Swedish
- Born: 12 April 1969 (age 57) Linköping, Sweden

Sport
- Sport: Handball
- Position: Center back
- Current club: Retired

Youth career
- Years: Team
- –: RP IF

Senior clubs
- Years: Team
- 1988–1992: RP IF
- 1992–1997: Sävsjö HK
- 1997–1999: HF Norrköbing
National team
Years	Team	Apps	(Gls)
1988–1997	Sweden	181	(293)

Gunilla Olsson Friberg (born 12 April 1969) is a Swedish former handball player for the Swedish national team, where she was the team captain.

== Career ==
Olsson started playing handball at RP IF. In 1992 she joined Sävsjö HK, where she won four Swedish Championships in a row from 1994 to 1997. The last two years of her career she played for HF Norrköping.

== National team ==
Olsson made her debut for the Swedish national team in 1988, while playing for RP. She represented Sweden at the 1990, 1993 and 1995 World Championships. She also represented Sweden at the inaugural Women's European Championship.

In total she played 181 matches for Sweden, which is the 10th most of any player.

== Private ==
Gunilla Olssons father was Stig Lennart Olsson, who plated for the Swedish national team and won gold medals at the 1958 World Championship. He was the player-coach at RP IF, where Gunilla started playing handball.
