= Sara Johansson (handballer) =

Swedish handball player (born 1992)

Personal information
- Nationality: Swedish
- Born: 2 October 1992 (age 34) Lindesberg, Sweden
- Height: 1.76 m (5 ft 9 in)

Sport
- Sport: Handball
- Position: Right back
- Current club: Skövde HF
- Number: 17

Youth career
- Years: Team
- –2009: Lindeskolans IF

Senior clubs
- Years: Team
- 2009–2012: Örebro SK
- 2012–2017: Skövde HF
- 2017–2018: Randers HK
- 2018–2024: Skara HF
- 2024-: Skövde HF
National team
Years	Team	Apps	(Gls)
2018–2022	Sweden	13	(22)

Sara Johansson (born 2 October 1992) is a Swedish handball player. She currently plays for Skövde HF and the Sweden women's national handball team.

With Skara she won the Swedish Championship in 2025, which was the first in club history.
