= Fredric Pettersson =

Swedish handball player (born 1989)

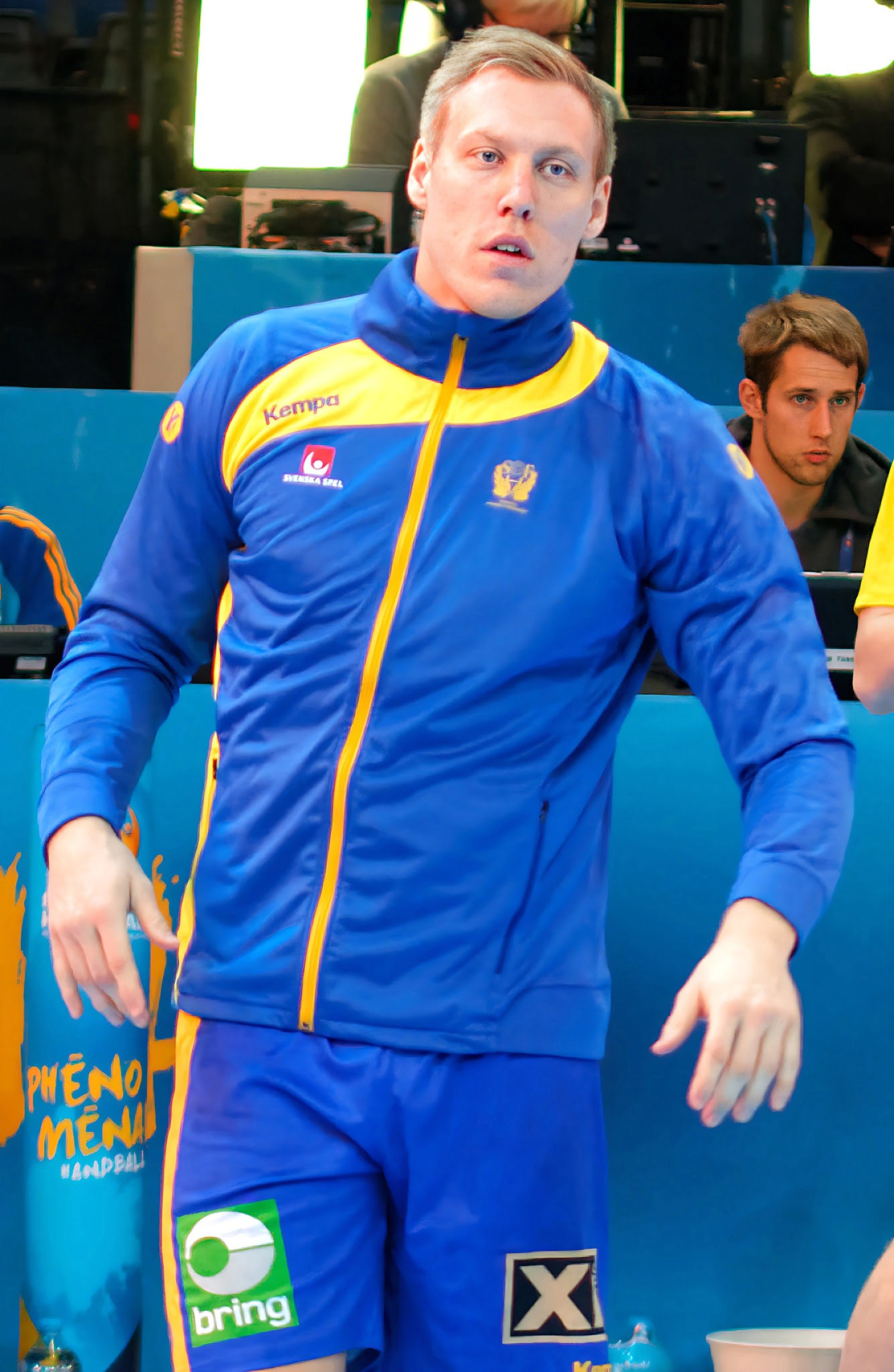

Personal information
- Nationality: Swedish
- Born: 11 February 1989 (age 37) Jönköping, Sweden
- Height: 2.01 m (6 ft 7 in)

Sport
- Sport: Handball
- Position: Pivot
- Current club: Skånela IF

Senior clubs
- Years: Team
- –2008: IK Cyrus
- 2008–2011: Hammarby IF
- 2011–2013: Aarhus Håndbold
- 2013–2016: IFK Kristianstad
- 2016–2018: Fenix Toulouse
- 2018–2021: Montpellier Handball
- 2021–2024: Fenix Toulouse
- 2024–: Skånela IF
National team
Years	Team	Apps	(Gls)
2010–2023	Sweden	103	(124)
Medal record
World Championship
Silver medal – second place	2021 Egypt
European Championship
Gold medal – first place	2022 Hungary/Slovakia
Silver medal – second place	2018 Croatia

Fredric Pettersson (born 11 February 1989) is a Swedish handball player for Skånela IF.

He participated at the 2017 World Men's Handball Championship.

At the 2022 European Championship he won gold medals with Sweden.
