= Jamina Roberts =

Swedish handball player (born 1990)

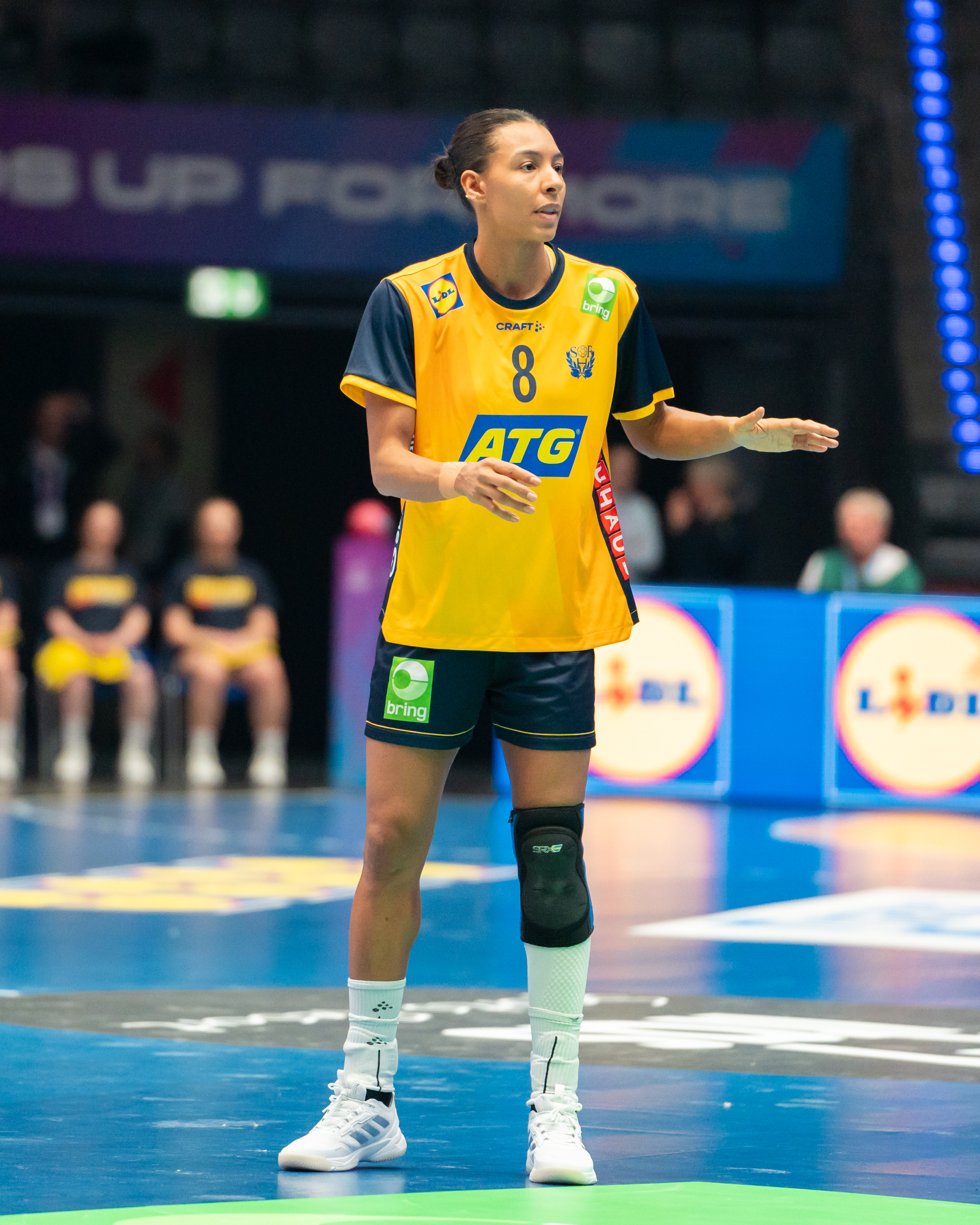
- Roberts in 2025

Personal information
- Full name: Jamina Caroline Roberts
- Nationality: Swedish
- Born: 28 May 1990 (age 36) Gothenburg, Sweden
- Height: 1.76 m (5 ft 9 in)

Sport
- Sport: Handball
- Position: Left back
- Current club: Ikast Håndbold
- Number: 8

Senior clubs
- Years: Team
- 2009–2014: IK Sävehof
- 2014–2016: TTH Holstebro
- 2016–2017: IK Sävehof
- 2017–2018: Érd HC
- 2018–2020: Randers HK
- 2020–2022: IK Sävehof
- 2022–01/2025: Vipers Kristiansand
- 01/2025–: Ikast Håndbold
National team
Years	Team	Apps	(Gls)
2010–2026	Sweden	273	(735)
Medal record
European Championship
Silver medal – second place	2010 Denmark/Norway
Bronze medal – third place	2014 Croatia/Hungary

Jamina Caroline Roberts (born 28 May 1990) is a Swedish handball player for Ikast Håndbold and formerly the Swedish national team. As of 2026 she has the most caps for the Swedish national team ever.

She competed at the 2012, 2016 2020 and 2024 Olympics. At the 2010 European Women's Handball Championship she reached the final and won a silver medal with the Swedish team.

== Career ==
Roberts started at Swedish club IK Sävehof, where she won the Swedish championship 6 times, every season between her debut in 2009 and 2014.

In 2014 she switched to Danish club TTH Holstebro. Here she played with her former teammates Linn Blohm and Nathalie Hagman. After two seasons in Denmark, her club was in economic trouble and could not extend her contract, and therefore she returned to her old club, IK Sävehof.

In 2017 she joined Hungarian side Érd HC for a single season, before joining Danish club Randers HK. In 2020 she returned to Sweden for a third stint at IK Sävehof.

From 2022 to 2025 she was at Norwegian club Vipers Kristiansand, where she won the EHF Champions League 2022/2023. She left following the bankruptcy of the club. Afterwards she joined Danish side Ikast Håndbold.

== Personal life ==
Roberts is part Aruban through her father, the bodybuilder James Roberts. Her younger brother, Kelvin Roberts, is also a handball player.

She has been in a relationship with the fellow Swedish handballer Emil Berggren since 2010. In 2020 they had a daughter together.

== Achievements ==
- EHF Champions League:
  - Winner: 2023
- EHF-Cup:
  - Winner: 2015
- EHF Cup Winners' Cup:
  - Winner: 2016
- Carpathian Trophy:
  - Winner: 2015
- Swedish League:
  - Winner: 2009, 2010, 2011, 2012, 2013, 2014, 2022
- Norwegian League:
  - Winner: 2022/2023, 2023/2024
- Norwegian Cup:
  - Winner: 2022/23, 2023/24

Best player in the Norwegian woman handball league 22/23

== Individual awards ==
- All-Star Left back of the Olympic Games: 2020
- Swedish Female Handballer of the Year: 2022, 2023
