= Yunisleidy Camejo =

Cuban handball player (born 1990)

Personal information
- Full name: Yunisleidy Camejo Rodríguez
- Born: 15 February 1990 (age 36) Pinar del Rio, Cuba
- Height: 1.83 m (6 ft 0 in)

Sport
- Sport: Handball
- Position: Pivot
- Current club: Borlänge HK
- Number: 23

Senior clubs
- Years: Team
- 2016–2017: Club León Balonmano
- 2017–2018: BM Alcobendas
- 2018–2019: BM Bera Bera
- 2019–2021: BM Aula Cultural
- 2021-: Borlänge HK
National team
Years	Team	Apps	(Gls)
–	Cuba	50	(100)
Medal record
Pan American Games
Bronze medal – third place	2019 Lima	Team
Pan American Championship
Silver medal – second place	2015 Cuba
Central American and Caribbean Games
Bronze medal – third place	2018 Barranquilla	Team
Nor.Ca. Championship
Gold medal – first place	2015 Puerto Rico

Yunisleidy "Yunis" Camejo Rodríguez (born 15 February 1990) is a Cuban handball player for Borlänge HK and the Cuban national team.

She competed at the 2015 World Women's Handball Championship in Denmark.
