= Sävsjö HK =

Swedish handball club

- Full name: Sävsjö handbollsklubb
- Short name: SHK
- Founded: 1 August 1978; 47 years ago
- Arena: Sävsjö sporthall, Sävsjö, Sweden
Home	Away

Sävsjö HK is a handball club in Sävsjö, Sweden, established on 1 August 1978. The women's team won six Swedish national championship gold medals in a row between the 1993–94 and the 1998–99 seasons before being relegated from Elitserien during the 2002–03 season.

== Titles ==
- Swedish Championship (6)
  - Winner: 1994, 1995, 1996, 1997, 1998, 1999

== Notable former players ==
- (Sweden) Filippa Idéhn
- (Sweden) Gunilla Olsson
- (Sweden) Kristina Jönsson
- (Sweden) Åsa Mogensen
