= Evelina Eriksson =

Swedish handball player (born 1996)

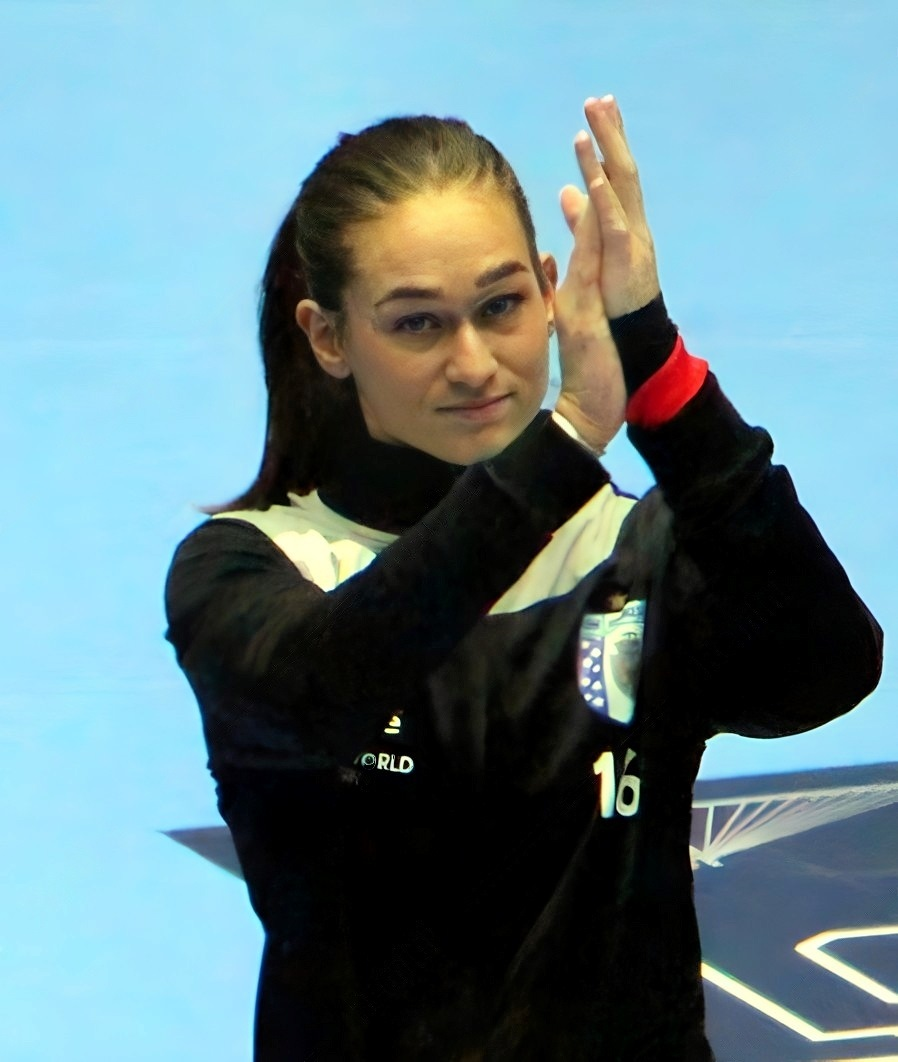
- Eriksson in 2022

Personal information
- Nationality: Swedish
- Born: 20 August 1996 (age 30) Haninge, Sweden
- Height: 1.84 m (6 ft 0 in)

Sport
- Sport: Handball
- Position: Goalkeeper
- Current club: Gloria Bistrița-Năsăud
- Number: 16

Senior clubs
- Years: Team
- –2013: Haninge HK
- 2013–2016: Spårvägens IF
- 2016–2018: Tyresö Handboll
- 2018–2020: Skuru IK
- 2020–2022: Vipers Kristiansand
- 2022–2026: CSM București
- 2026–: Gloria Bistrița-Năsăud
National team
Years	Team	Apps	(Gls)
2020–	Sweden	51	(1)
- Updated on 27 October 2025

Evelina Eriksson (born 20 August 1996) is a Swedish handballer for Gloria Bistrița-Năsăud and the Swedish national team.

Eriksson was chosen to participate for Sweden at the 2020 European Women's Handball Championship, but was cut from the squad right before the tournament started.

== Achievements ==
- Champions League:
  - Winner: 2020/2021, 2021/2022
- Norwegian League:
  - Winner: 2020/2021, 2021/2022
- Norwegian Cup:
  - Winner: 2020, 2021
