= Edijana Dafe =

Swedish handball player (born 1990)

Personal information
- Full name: Edijana Dafe
- Nationality: Swedish
- Born: 27 May 1990 (age 36) Gothenburg, Sweden
- Height: 1.64 m (5 ft 5 in)

Sport
- Sport: Handball
- Position: Left Wing
- Number: 23

Youth career
- Years: Team
- –: GIK Wasaiterna

Senior clubs
- Years: Team
- 2009-2011: Kärra HF
- 2011-2015: IK Sävehof
- 2015: København Håndbold
- 2017-2018: BK Heid
National team
Years	Team	Apps	(Gls)
2013-2015	Sweden	13	(20)
Medal record
European Championship
Bronze medal – third place	2014 Croatia/Hungary	Team

Edijana Dafe (born 27 May 1990) is a former Swedish female handballer who played as a left wing for the Swedish national team.

== International honours ==
- European Championship:
  - Bronze Medalist: 2014
- Carpathian Trophy:
  - Winner: 2015
