= Josefine Dragenberg =

Danish handball player (born 1997)

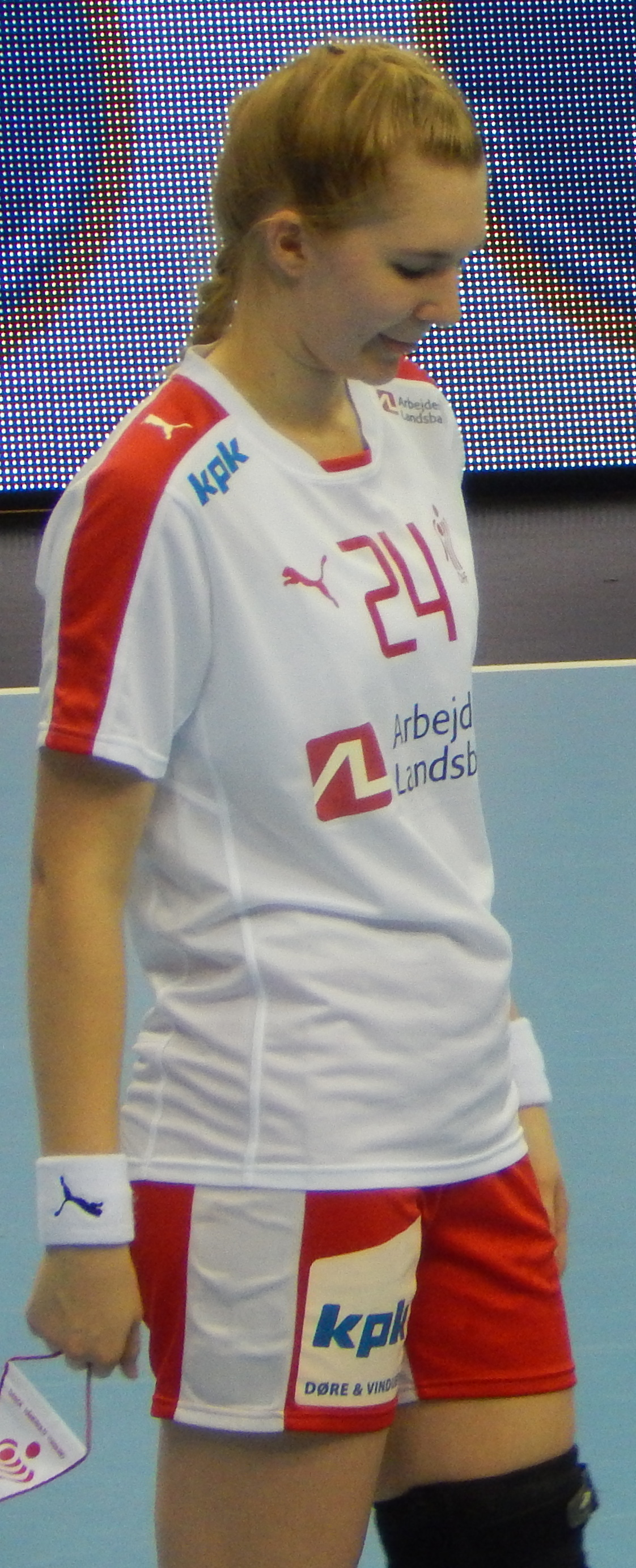

Personal information
- Full name: Josefine Dragenberg
- Nationality: Danish
- Born: 10 April 1997 (age 29) Herning, Denmark
- Height: 1.86 m (6 ft 1 in)

Sport
- Sport: Handball
- Position: Line player
- Current club: SønderjyskE Håndbold
- Number: 24

Youth career
- Years: Team
- 2013-2014: Randers HK

Senior clubs
- Years: Team
- 2014-2020: Randers HK
- 2020-2022: Holstebro Håndbold
- 2020–: SønderjyskE Håndbold
Medal record
IHF Junior World Championship
Gold medal – first place	2016 Russia

Josefine Dragenberg (born 10 April 1997) is a Danish handball player who currently plays for SønderjyskE Håndbold.
