= Katarina Arfwidsson =

Swedish handball player (born 1973)

Katarina Chrifi
Personal information
- Full name: Anna Katarina Marianne Chrifi
- Nationality: Swedish
- Born: 3 April 1973 (age 53)
- Height: 1.74 m (5 ft 9 in)

Sport
- Sport: Handball
- Position: Right back
- Current club: Retired

Youth career
- Years: Team
- –: Haninge HK

Senior clubs
- Years: Team
- –1998: Stockholmspolisens IF
- 1998–2007: Skuru IK
National team
Years	Team	Apps	(Gls)
1996–2007	Sweden	132	(493)

Anna Katarina Marianne Chrifi (née Arfwidsson 3 April 1973) is a Swedish former handball player for the Swedish national team. She was named Swedish handballer of the year twice, in 2001 and 2004.

== Club career ==
Arfwidsson started playing handball at Haninge HK at the age of 7. She then joined Stockholmspolisens IF, where she played until 1998. In the 1996–97 season she was the second highest goalscorer in the Swedish league.

In 1998 she joined Skuru IK. Here she was one of the most important players for the Skuru team that won 3 Swedish championships; in 2001, 2004 and 2005.

She did consider moving abroad, but decided to stay as an amateur in Sweden. After giving birth to her second child in 2005, she took a break from handball, but came back for one more season in order to play at the 2006 European Women's Handball Championship.

== National team ==
Katarina Chrifis made her debut for the Swedish national team on 25 October 1996 against Denmark. She represented Sweden at multiple international tournaments, including the 2001 World Championship and the 2004 and 2006 European Championships. Her last match for Sweden was in 2007. She missed the 2002 European Women's Handball Championship due to being on pregnancy leave.
