= Tomas Sivertsson =

Swedish handball player (born 1965)

Thomas Sivertsson
Personal information
- Full name: Lars Thomas Sivertsson
- Nationality: Swedish
- Born: 21 February 1965 (age 61) Halmstad, Sweden
- Height: 1.95 m (6 ft 5 in)

Sport
- Sport: Handball
- Position: Pivot
- Current club: Retired

Senior clubs
- Years: Team
- -1988: Halmstad HP IF
- 1988-1999: HK Drott
- 1999-2001: BM Granollers
- 2001-2008: KIF Kolding
National team
Years	Team	Apps	(Gls)
1992-2009	Sweden	220	(0)

Teams managed
- 2005-2010: Portugal men Assistant
- 2008-2009: KIF Kolding
- 2012-2014: Sweden women Assistant
- 2014-2016: Sweden women
- 2016-2019: HK Drott women
- 2018-: Estonia men
Medal record
Silver medal – second place	1996 Atlanta	Team
Silver medal – second place	2000 Sydney	Team
European Championship
Gold medal – first place	1998 Italy
Gold medal – first place	2000 Croatia
Gold medal – first place	2002 Sweden
World Championship
Gold medal – first place	1999 Egypt
Silver medal – second place	2001 France
Bronze medal – third place	1995 Iceland

Lars Thomas Sivertsson (born 21 February 1965) is a Swedish handball player and handball coach who was a part of the Swedish golden generation nicknamed the Bengan Boys. He won both the European Championship and the World Championship as a player.

== Playing career ==
Sivertsson began playing handball at his hometown club Halmstad HP IF and joined top league team HK Drott, where he won the Swedish Championship four times. In 2000 he joined Spanish top league team BM Granollers for one season. Next season he joined Danish side KIF Kolding. Here he won the Danish championship five times.

Sivertsson was on the team that won the European Championship three times in a row; in 1998, 2000 and 2002. He also won the 1999 World Championship with Sweden, and he competed in the 1996 Summer Olympics and in the 2000 Summer Olympics. In 1996 he was a member of the Swedish handball team which won the silver medal in the Olympic tournament. He played all six matches and scored twelve goals. Four years later he was part of the Swedish team which won the silver medal again. He played all seven matches and scored eleven goals.

== Coaching career ==
After his playing time at KIF Kolding he became the assistant coach and in 2008 to 2009 he became the coach of the club. In 2009 he became the coach of the Polish team Wisła Płock. From 2005 to 2010 he was the assistant coach to Portugal men's team under Mats Olsson.

In 2012 he became the assistant at the Swedish women's national team. When Torbjörn Klingvall ceased to be the coach of the Swedish women's team, Sivertsson took over in cooperation with Helle Thomsen. Here he stayed until January 2016.

In June 2018 he took over the Estonia men's national handball team.

== Personal life ==
His brother, Ulf Sivertsson, is also a handball coach at HK Drott. His children, Hugo Sivertsson and Sally Sivertsson are both handball players.
