= Mathilde Hylleberg =

Danish handball player (born 1998)

Personal information
- Nationality: Danish
- Born: 1 December 1998 (age 27) Struer, Denmark
- Height: 1.69 m (5 ft 7 in)

Sport
- Sport: Handball
- Position: Right wing
- Current club: TTH Holstebro
- Number: 3

Senior clubs
- Years: Team
- 2015–2019: TTH Holstebro
- 2021–: Holstebro Håndbold
National team
Years	Team	Apps	(Gls)
2018–2019	Denmark	9	(13)
Medal record
European Youth Olympic Festival
Silver medal – second place	2015 Tbilisi

Mathilde Hylleberg (born 1 December 1998) is a Danish former female handball player, who last played for TTH Holstebro and the Danish national team.

She participated at the 2018 European Women's Handball Championship.

She ended her playing career at only 21, citing a lack of motivation as the reason. She un-retired in 2022, where she signed a one-year contract with TTH Holstebro. When the women's team broke away from TTH and became Holstebro Håndbold, she followed the club. In 2023 she extended her contract until 2026.

== Achievements ==
- Damehåndboldligaen:
  - Bronze Medalist: 2016
- Danish Cup:
  - Bronze Medalist: 2019
- Women's EHF Cup Winners' Cup:
  - Winner: 2016
