= Maja Eriksson =

Swedish handball player (born 1991)

Personal information
- Full name: Maja Valborg Eriksson
- Nationality: Swedish
- Born: 1 May 1991 (age 35) Karlskrona, Sweden
- Height: 1.78 m (5 ft 10 in)

Sport
- Sport: Handball
- Position: Left back
- Current club: Skara HF
- Number: 24

Senior clubs
- Years: Team
- -2010: Karlskronaflottan IF
- 2010-2011: H43/Lundagård
- 2011-2016: Skövde HF
- 2016-2018: Team Tvis Holstebro
- 2018-2020: Önnereds HK
- 2020-2022: Skara HF

Maja Valborg Eriksson (born 1 May 1991) is a Swedish handball player.

She started her handball in Flottans IF where she played until 2010. She after that played for H 43 Lundagård but only for one year. She left Lund for Skövde HF, playing for them in five seasons. In 2016 she became a professional player when she signed for Danish side Team Tvis Holstebro. She was professional only for two years, before she returned to Sweden and played for Önnereds HK in Gothenburg. In 2020 she joined Skara HF, where she was reunited with her former coach from 2011 to 2016 in Skövde HF, Magnus Frisk. After two years in Skara HF she retired in 2022.
