= Ilda Kepić =

Danish handball player (born 1995)

Personal information
- Nationality: Danish/Montenegrin
- Born: 17 January 1995 (age 31) Thisted, Denmark
- Height: 1.82 m (6 ft 0 in)

Sport
- Sport: Handball
- Position: Left back
- Current club: ŽRK Budućnost
- Number: 95

Senior clubs
- Years: Team
- 2013-2015: Skive fH
- 2015-2016: Randers HK
- 2016-2018: Vendsyssel Håndbold
- 2018–2020: TTH Holstebro
- 2020-2021: Skövde HF
- 2021-: ŽRK Budućnost Podgorica
National team
Years	Team	Apps	(Gls)
2022–	Montenegro	12	(2)
Medal record
European Championship
Bronze medal – third place	2022 Slovenia/North Macedonia/Montenegro

Ilda Kepić (born 17 January 1995) is a Danish/Montenegrin handball player who currently plays for ŽRK Budućnost Podgorica and the Montenegrin national team.
