= Gråkjær Arena =

Building in Denmark

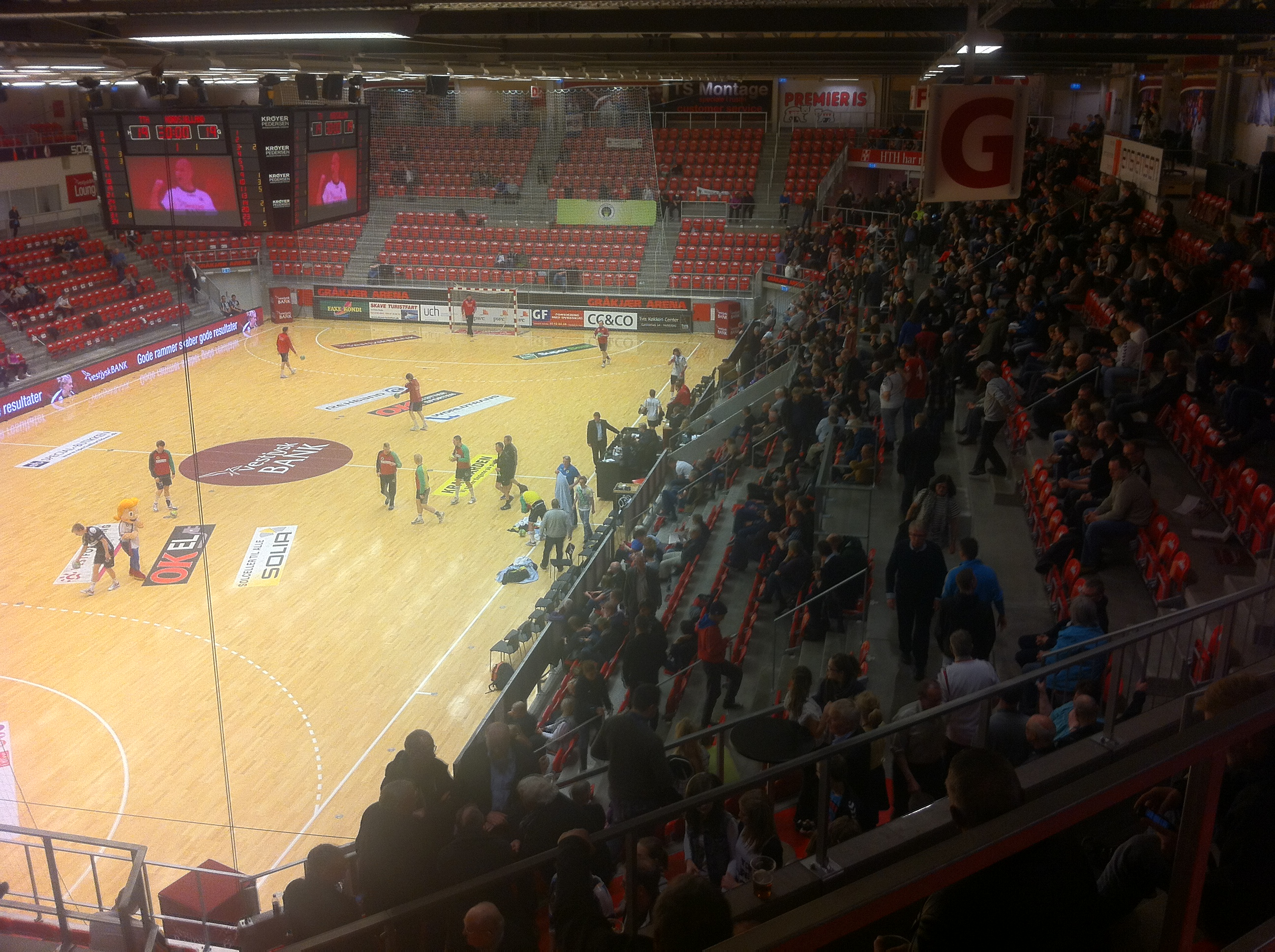
- Interactive map of Gråkjær Arena
- Location: Hostrupsvej 27; 7500 Holstebro
- Coordinates: 56.3720°N 8.6229°E
- Capacity: 3.250 (2,750 seats)

Construction
- Built: 2009-2011
- Opened: 2 February 2011
- Cost: 55 million DKK

Tenant
- Team Tvis Holstebro

Gråkjær Arena is a sports center in Holstebro, Denmark. It has room for 3,250 spectators and is used primarily as home of the handball clubs Team Tvis Holstebro and Holstebro Håndbold.

== History ==
On 10 November 2009 did the former mayor Arne Lægaard, the former culture and leisure department chairman HC Østerby and handball players Lars Rasmussen and Kristina Kristiansen broke ground and topping-out ceremony was 23 June 2010. The hall was inaugurated 2 February 2011 with a match in the women's handball league between Team Tvis Holstebro and Viborg HK. The arena cost 55 million kroner to build
