= Linn Blohm =

Swedish handball player (born 1992)

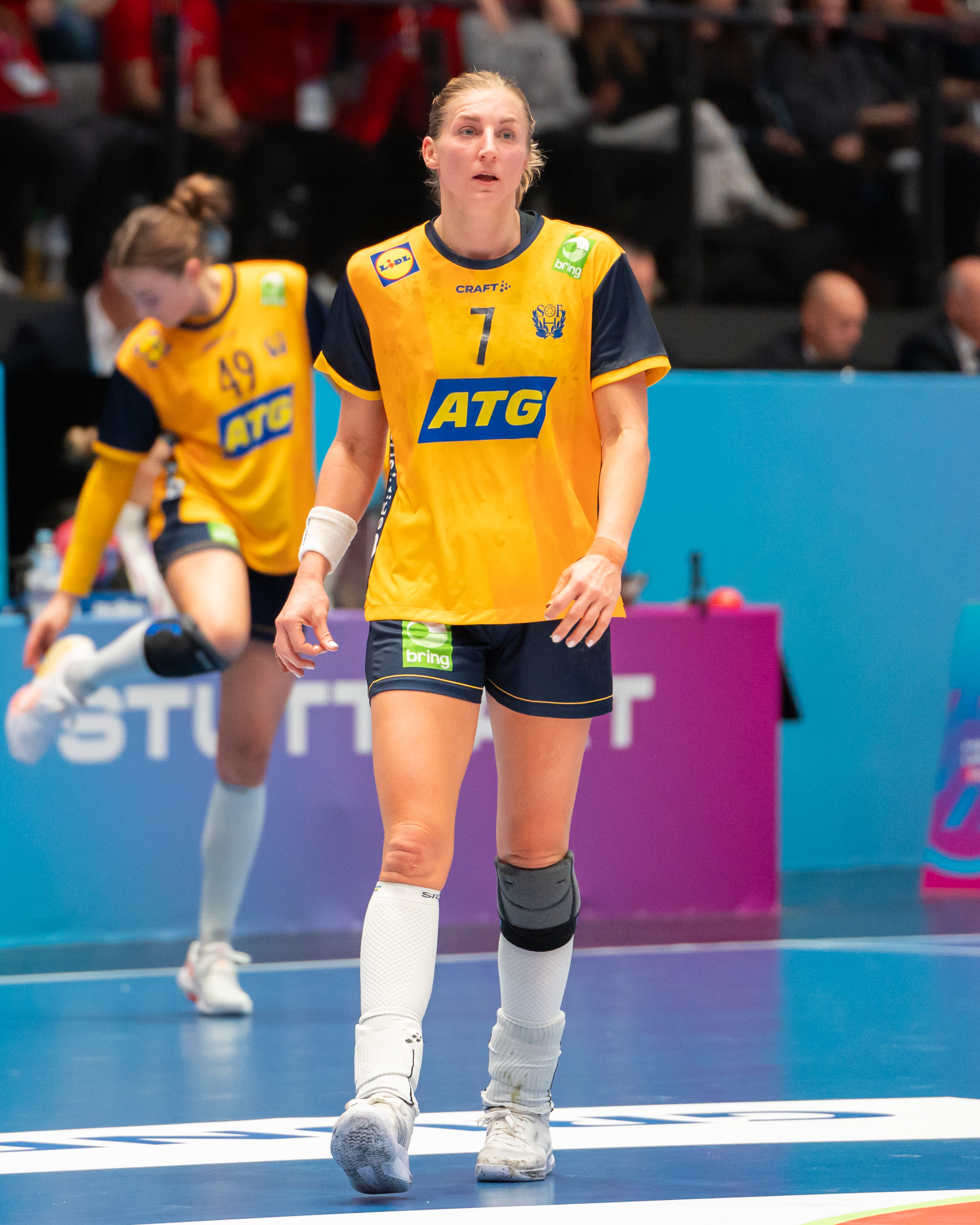
- Blohm in 2025

Personal information
- Nationality: Swedish
- Born: 20 May 1992 (age 34) Stockholm, Sweden
- Height: 1.80 m (5 ft 11 in)

Sport
- Sport: Handball
- Position: Pivot
- Current club: Győri ETO KC
- Number: 5

Senior clubs
- Years: Team
- –2008: Gustafsbergs IF HK
- 2008–2014: IK Sävehof
- 2014–2016: TTH Holstebro
- 2016–2018: FC Midtjylland Håndbold
- 2018–2020: København Håndbold
- 2020–2021: Minaur Baia Mare
- 2021–: Győri ETO KC
National team
Years	Team	Apps	(Gls)
2012–	Sweden	187	(543)
Medal record
European Championship
Bronze medal – third place	2014 Croatia/Hungary
Junior World Championship
Gold medal – first place	2012 Czech Republic
Youth World Championship
Gold medal – first place	2010 Dominican Republic

Linn Blohm (born 20 May 1992) is a Swedish professional handballer who plays as a line player for Győri ETO KC and the Swedish national team.

== Achievements ==
- EHF Champions League:
  - Winner: 2024, 2025
  - Silver medalist: 2022
- EHF Cup / EHF European League:
  - Winner: 2015
  - Bronze Medalist: 2021
- EHF Cup Winners' Cup:
  - Winner: 2016
- Romanian League
  - Silver Medalist: 2021
- Hungarian Championship
  - Winner: 2022, 2023, 2025
- Hungarian Cup
  - Silver Medalist: 2022, 2023, 2024, 2025
- Swedish Championship
  - Winner: 2011, 2012, 2013, 2014

== Individual awards ==
- All-Star Line player of the World Championship: 2019, 2023
- All-Star Line player of the Danish League: 2020
- All-Star Line player of the Romanian League: 2021
- Swedish Female Handballer of the Year: 2020, 2024
- All-Star Line player of the EHF Champions League: 2022

== Personal life ==
Blohm is deaf in her left ear. She has a child, born in March 2018. She supports AIK IF.
