= Kvinnliga IK Sport =

Swedish sports club

- Full name: Kvinnliga idrottsklubben Sport
- Sport: handball cycling, gymnastics, track and field athletics, speedskating, orienteering (earlier)
- Founded: 1927
- Based in: Gothenburg, Sweden
- Arena: Valhalla sporthall

Kvinnliga IK Sport is a sports club in Gothenburg, Sweden, which just as the name says only runs women's activity. Since the late 1970s, men are however allowed to be board members. While nowadays only running handball activity, winning 14 Swedish national indoor championship titles between 1951 and 1972 (1951, 1952, 1953, 1954, 1955, 1957, 1958, 1959, 1960, 1961, 1964, 1969, 1971 and 1972), it earlier even ran cycling, gymnastics, track and field athletics, speedskating and orienteering.
