= Helle Thomsen =

Danish handball player and coach (born 1970)

Personal information
- Nationality: Danish
- Born: 30 November 1970 (age 55) Frederikshavn, Denmark

Sport
- Sport: Handball
- Position: Centre back
- Current club: Denmark (head coach)

Youth career
- Years: Team
- –: Frederikshavn KFUM

Senior clubs
- Years: Team
- –: Frederikshavn fI
- 1988-1991: Lyngså BK
- 1991-1992: Skogn IL
- 1992-1993: Drammen HK
- 1993-1997: Frederikshavn fI
- 2001-2004: Sindal IF

Teams managed
- 2009-1/2011: TTH Holstebro (assistant)
- 1/2011-2012: FC Midtjylland (assistant)
- 2012–2016: FC Midtjylland
- 2014–2015: Sweden
- 2016–2019: Netherlands
- 2017–2018: CSM București
- 2018–2020: Molde Elite
- 2020–2021: Kastamonu Bld. GSK
- 2021–2022: Neptunes de Nantes (assistant)
- 2022–2024: Neptunes de Nantes
- 2024–2025: CSM București
- 2025–: Denmark
Medal record
Coach for women's handball
Representing Sweden
European Championship
Bronze medal – third place	2014 Hungary/Croatia
Representing Netherlands
World Championship
Bronze medal – third place	2017 Germany
European Championship
Silver medal – second place	2016 Sweden
Bronze medal – third place	2018 France

Helle Thomsen (born 30 November 1970) is a Danish handball coach and former player, who is the current head coach of Denmark women's team.

== Playing career ==
Helle Thomsen started playing handball at Fredrikshavn KFUM at the age of 6. Later she played youth handball at Frederikshavn fI. From 1988 he played for Lyngså BK, who played in the top division at the time. Here she bronze medals in the Danish handball championship in the 1989-90 season.

Later she joined Skogn IL, followed Drammen HK in Norway. In 1993 she returned to her hometown Frederikshavn and joined Frederikshavn fI. Here she won silver medals in the 1996-97 season.

From 2001 to 2004 she acted as the player-coach of the Danish amateur club Sindal IF.

== Coaching career ==
Between 2009 and 2012, she served as assistant coach to Niels Agesen in TTH Holstebro. Here he was part of the team that won promotion from the 1st Division in 2010. In 2010 she was offered the head coach position at her hometown club FOX Team Nord, after they had been administratively relegated to the third tier after going bankrupt. She rejected the offer to stay at TTH. 6 months later she became the assistant coach at FC Midtjylland Håndbold under Kenneth Jensen and Ryan Zinglersen.

=== FC Midtjylland/Sweden ===
She then was head coach for FC Midtjylland Håndbold between 2012 and 2016, and the Swedish national team between 2014 and 2015 alongside Thomas Sivertsson. As head coach, she won the Danish championship twice, the Danish Handball Cup thrice and the EHF Cup Winners' Cup once. In addition to that, she led FC Midtjylland to the Final Four tournament in the 2013–2014 Champions League season. She was fired in Midtjylland in 2016 due to 'disagreements over the future strategy'.

With Sweden she won bronze medals at the 2014 European Championship.

=== Netherlands and Bucharest ===
In 2016 she became the head coach of the Netherlands women's team. Her first major international tournament was the 2016 European Championship, where she won silver medals, losing to Norway in the final. A year later she won bronze medals at the 2017 World Championship. Her last tournament with the Netherlands was the 2018 European Championship, where she once again won bronze medals.

While coaching the Netherlands she also became the head coach at Romanian CSM București. She was however fired within her first season for poor results.

=== Return to club handball ===
In 2018 she became the head coach of norwegian club Molde Elite on a two year deal. When her contract expired in 2020, she left the club.

In 2020 she became the head coach of Turkish club Kastamonu Bld. GSK, but just a year later she left the club, due to a clause in her contract, that allowed her to leave a year later. Instead she became the assistant coach and later head coach of French club Neptunes de Nantes. She left the club in 2024, after being released of her contract. It was during a turbulent time at the club, where due to economy many players and personal was leaving the club.

In 2024 she returned to CSM București to become the head coach again. Thomsen said regarding the offer, that she initially wanted to return to Denmark, but was drawn by the allure of playing in the Champions League.

=== Denmark ===
On April 9th, 2025 it was announced that she will take over as the head coach of the Denmark women's team in the summer of 2025, replacing Jesper Jensen. This makes her the only second woman to coach the Danish national team after Else Birkmose, who was the coach from 1963 to 1965. This meant she left her coaching position at CSM București on mutual termination one year before her contract expired. She signed a contract with the Danish national team until 2028.

On September 20th, 2025 she had her debut match; a 39-23 win in a friendly against Iceland. At her first major international tournament for Denmark, the 2025 World Women's Handball Championship, they went out in the quarterfinal to France after winning all matches in the group stages. The Danish team was affected by a lot of players missing the tournament including goalkeepers Sandra Toft and Althea Reinhardt and pivots Sarah Iversen and Rikke Iversen. This was the first time since 2019 that Denmark left a major international tournament without any medals.

== Titles ==
=== As Coach ===
==== International ====
With Sweden

- European Women's Handball Championship:
  - Bronze medals: 2014

With Netherlands

- World Women's Handball Championship:
  - Bronze medals: 2017
- European Women's Handball Championship:
  - Silver medals: 2016
  - Bronze medals: 2018

==== Club ====
- Danish Women's Handball Cup
  - Winner: 2012, 2014, 2015
- Danish Women's Handball League
  - Winner: 2013, 2015
  - Silver medals: 2014, 2016
- EHF Cup Winners' Cup
  - Winner: 2015

=== As player ===
- Danish Women's Handball League
  - Silver medals: 1996-97
  - Bronze medals: 1989-90

== Private ==
Helle Thomsen has acted as the foster parent for Danish handballer Sabine Pedersen.
