= Torbjörn Klingvall =

Swedish handball coach (born 1955)

Torbjörn Klingvall (born 30 May 1955 in Jukkasjärvi, Norrbotten, Sweden) is a Swedish international handball player and coach.

He has been coach of the Swedish women's national team between 2012 and 2013.

== Clubs - player ==
- Kiruna BK (–1976)
- HK Drott (1976–1982)
- GF Kroppskultur (1982–1984)
- IK Heim (1985–1986)

== Coaching history ==
- IFK Malmö (1984–1985)
- Västra Frölunda IF (1985–1986)
- IF Urædd (1987–1989)
- GF Kroppskultur (1989–1991)
- Sandefjord TIF (1993–1997)
- Kragerø IF (1997–2000)
- Herøya IF (advisor, 2000–2002)
- Sweden men's national youth handball team (2006–2012)
- Gjerpen IF, women (2008–2011)
- SK Falk, men (2011–2016)
- Sweden women (2012–2013)
- Nøtterøy Håndball (2016–)
