= Borlänge HK =

Swedish handball club

- Full name: Borlänge handbollklubb
- Short name: BHK
- Founded: 1947
- Arena: Maserhallen, Borlänge
- Capacity: 1,750
- Club colours
Home	Away

Borlänge HK is a handball club in Borlänge in Sweden, established in 1947. The club won the Swedish women's national championship in 1970, 1973 and 1978. The women's team played 11 seasons in the Swedish top division between 1971–1972 and 1995–1996. and the men's team played in the Swedish top division during the 1984–1985 season. After winning Division 2 during the previous season, the women's team have advanced to Div 1 North as of season 2020–2021. The men's team won div 2 in 2022, and advanced to div 1 North from season 2023–2024.

Location of Borlänge HK

== Sports Hall information ==
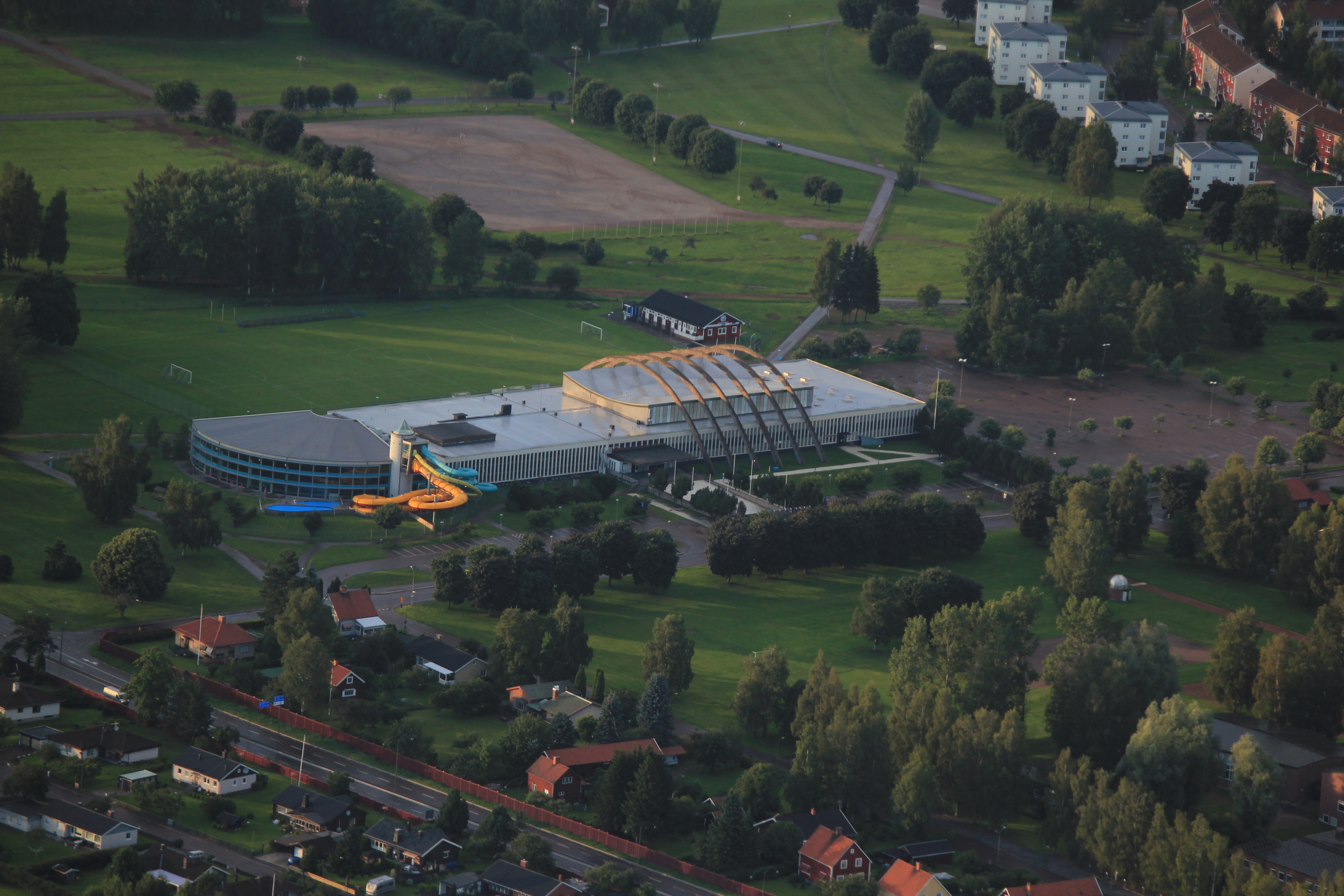
Home hall: Maserhallen

- Name: – Maserhallen
- City: – Borlänge
- Capacity: – 1750
- Address: – Masergatan 22, 784 40 Borlänge, Sweden

== Kits ==
HOME
2012–13	2013–14	2018–

AWAY
2014–18	2018–
