= Skånela IF =

Swedish sports club

- Full name: Skånela Idrottsförening
- Short name: SIF
- Founded: 1949; 77 years ago
- Arena: Vikingahallen, Märsta
- Capacity: 600
- Head coach: Fredrik Söderberg Wernheim
- League: Allsvenskan
- Club colours
| Home | Away |

Skånela IF is a sports club in Märsta, Sweden, established in 1949, mostly playing handball. The club won the Swedish women's national handball championship in 1992.

Location of Skånela IF

== Kits ==
HOME
| 2012–13 | 2019-20 | 2020- |

AWAY
| 2019-20 | 2020- |

THIRD
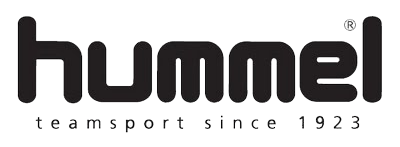
2020-

== Team ==
=== Current squad ===
Squad for the 2026–27 season

Goalkeepers

- (Sweden) Linus Karlsson

Left Wingers
Right Wingers
Line players

- (Sweden) Erik Östling

Left Backs
Central Backs
Right Backs

- (Sweden) Elias Lundstad

=== Transfers ===
Transfers for the 2026–27 season

Joining

- (Sweden) Erik Östling (LP) from (Italy) Cassano Magnago HC
- (Sweden) Linus Karlsson (GK) from (Sweden) Önnereds HK

Leaving

=== Transfer History ===
Transfers for the 2025–26 season

Joining

- (Sweden) Elias Lundstad (RB) from (Sweden) Amo Handboll

Leaving

- (Sweden) Gustav Naslund (RB) to (Sweden) Ystads IF
