= Sweden women's national handball team =

Sweden

Information
- Association: Swedish Handball Federation
- Coach: Tomas Axnér
- Assistant coach: Jesper Östlund
- Captain: Emma Lindqvist
- Most caps: Jamina Roberts (273)
- Most goals: Mia Hermansson-Högdahl (1153)

Colours
1st	2nd

Results

Summer Olympics
- Appearances: 5 (First in 2008)
- Best result: 4th (2020, 2024)

World Championship
- Appearances: 13 (First in 1957)
- Best result: 4th (2017, 2023)

European Championship
- Appearances: 14 (First in 1994)
- Best result: (silver) 2nd (2010)
- Last updated on Unknown.

Sweden women's national handball team
Medal record

European Championship
Silver medal – second place	2010 Denmark–Norway	
Bronze medal – third place	2014 Croatia–Hungary	

The Sweden women's national handball team (Swedish: Sveriges damlandslag i handboll) is the national team of Sweden. It is governed by the Swedish Handball Federation (Swedish: Svenska Handbollförbundet) and takes part in international handball competitions.

== Honours ==
Competition	1st place, gold medalist(s)	2nd place, silver medalist(s)	3rd place, bronze medalist(s)	Total
Olympic Games	0	0	0	0
World Championship	0	0	0	0
European Championship	0	1	1	2
Total	0	1	1	2

== Competitive record ==
Champions Runners-up Third place Fourth place

== Results ==
=== Olympic Games ===
Games	Round	Position	Pld	W	D	L	GF	GA	GD
(Canada) 1976 Montreal	Did not qualify								
(Soviet Union) 1980 Moscow	Did not qualify								
(United States) 1984 Los Angeles	Did not qualify								
(South Korea) 1988 Seoul	Did not qualify								
(Spain) 1992 Barcelona	Did not qualify								
(United States) 1996 Atlanta	Did not qualify								
(Australia) 2000 Sydney	Did not qualify								
(Greece) 2004 Athens	Did not qualify								
(China) 2008 Beijing	Quarter final	8th of 12	6	2	0	4	147	168	−21
(United Kingdom) 2012 London	Preliminary round	11th of 12	5	0	0	5	108	131	−23
(Brazil) 2016 Rio de Janeiro	Quarter final	7th of 12	6	2	1	3	170	174	−4
(Japan) 2020 Tokyo	Bronze final	4th of 12	8	5	1	3	237	228	+9
(France) 2024 Paris	Bronze final	4th of 12	8	5	0	3	229	218	+11
Total	5/13	0 Titles	33	14	2	18	891	919	–28

=== World Championship ===
==== Competitive record at the World Championship ====
Year	Position	Pld	W	D	L	GS	GA	+/-
(Socialist Federal Republic of Yugoslavia) 1957	8th	4	1	0	3	9	19	−10
(Socialist Republic of Romania) 1962	Did not qualify							
(Germany) 1965	Did not qualify							
(Netherlands) 1971	Did not qualify							
(Socialist Federal Republic of Yugoslavia) 1973	Did not qualify							
(Soviet Union) 1975	Did not qualify							
(Czech Republic) 1978	Did not qualify							
(Hungary) 1982	Did not qualify							
(Netherlands) 1986	Did not qualify							
(South Korea) 1990	13th	6	3	1	2	137	119	+18
(Norway) 1993	6th	7	4	0	3	140	124	+16
(Austria) (Hungary) 1995	11th	8	4	0	4	175	166	+9
(Germany) 1997	Did not qualify							
(Denmark) (Norway) 1999	Did not qualify							
(Italy) 2001	8th	9	6	0	3	228	224	+4
(Croatia) 2003	Did not qualify							
(Russia) 2005	Did not qualify							
(France) 2007	Did not qualify							
(China) 2009	13th	8	6	0	2	247	191	+56
(Brazil) 2011	9th	6	3	0	3	164	123	+41
(Serbia) 2013	Did not qualify							
(Denmark) 2015	9th	6	4	1	1	211	160	+51
(Germany) 2017	4th	9	6	0	3	262	231	+31
(Japan) 2019	7th	9	6	1	2	262	214	+48
(Spain) 2021	5th	7	4	2	1	270	167	+103
(Denmark) (Norway) (Sweden) 2023	4th	9	7	0	2	261	204	+57
(Germany) (Netherlands) 2025	15th	6	3	0	3	186	163	+23
(Hungary) 2027	TBD							
(Spain) 2029	TBD							
(Czech Republic) (Poland) 2031	TBD							
Total	13/30	95	57	5	32	2554	2105	+427

==== Record against other teams at the World Championship ====
National Team	Pld	W	D	L	PF	PA	+/-
Angola	3	3	0	0	77	53	+24
Argentina	1	1	0	0	37	11	+26
Australia	1	1	0	0	66	21	+45
Austria	4	0	1	3	85	93	−8
Brazil	1	1	0	0	26	23	+3
Canada	1	1	0	0	21	16	+5
China	1	0	0	1	15	17	−2
Republic of the Congo	2	2	0	0	57	40	+17
Croatia	1	0	0	1	26	27	−1
Denmark	3	1	0	2	66	68	−2
(Czechoslovakia) Czech republic*	3	1	0	2	42	42	-
France	4	1	0	3	92	88	+4
Germany	2	0	0	2	42	50	−8
Hungary	2	1	0	1	32	38	−6
Ivory Coast	2	2	0	0	54	40	+14
Japan	1	1	0	0	27	14	+13
The Netherlands	1	1	0	0	23	21	+2
Norway	1	0	0	1	15	26	−11
Poland	1	0	0	1	1	4	−3
Romania	3	3	0	0	48	40	+8
Russia	1	0	0	1	19	25	−6
Spain	1	1	0	0	27	24	+3
Slovakia	1	1	0	0	26	20	+6
South Korea	1	0	0	1	25	34	−9
Thailand	1	1	0	0	49	18	+31
Ukraine	2	1	0	1	53	55	−2
Uruguay	1	1	0	0	31	14	+17
(United States) USA	1	1	0	0	30	11	+19
(Socialist Federal Republic of Yugoslavia) F.R. Yugoslavia	1	0	0	1	18	32	−14
Total	48	26	1	21	1130	955	+175

*Results against the Czech republic also include Czechoslovakia (−1993) and the combined team of the Czech republic and Slovakia (1993).
Results updated 16 June 2014.

=== European Championship ===
==== Competitive record at the European Championship ====
Year	Position	Pld	W	D	L	GS	GA	+/-
(Germany) 1994	7th	6	3	0	3	134	145	−11
(Denmark) 1996	8th	6	2	0	4	142	171	−29
(Netherlands) 1998	Did not qualify							
(Romania) 2000	Did not qualify							
(Denmark) 2002	15th	3	0	0	3	79	94	−15
(Hungary) 2004	14th	3	0	0	3	68	81	−13
(Sweden) 2006	6th	7	3	0	4	156	170	−14
(North Macedonia) 2008	9th	6	2	2	2	134	135	−1
(Denmark) (Norway) 2010	2nd	8	6	0	2	199	176	+23
(Serbia) 2012	8th	6	3	1	2	153	142	+11
(Croatia) (Hungary) 2014	3rd	8	5	1	2	238	220	+18
(Sweden) 2016	8th	6	1	1	4	149	156	−7
(France) 2018	6th	7	3	1	3	191	192	−1
(Denmark) (Norway) 2020	11th	6	1	1	4	148	162	−14
(Slovenia) (North Macedonia) (Montenegro) 2022	5th	7	5	0	2	206	179	+27
(Austria) (Hungary) (Switzerland) 2024	5th	8	5	0	3	241	206	+35
(Czech Republic) (Poland) (Romania) (Slovakia) (Turkey) 2026	Qualified							
(Denmark) (Norway) (Sweden) 2028	Qualified as co-host							
(Belgium) (France) 2030	TBD							
(Denmark) (Germany) (Poland) 2032	TBD							
Total	16/20	79	34	7	38	1997	2023	-26

==== Record against other teams at the European Championship ====
National Team	Pld	W	D	L	PF	PA	+/-
Austria	4	1	0	3	93	100	−7
Belarus	1	0	1	0	21	21	0
Czech Republic	2	2	0	0	59	46	+13
Croatia	4	1	0	3	99	106	−7
Denmark	3	1	0	2	60	89	−29
France	3	1	0	2	67	72	−5
Germany	3	2	0	1	88	90	−2
Hungary	2	2	0	0	55	45	+10
Montenegro	2	1	0	1	54	53	+1
North Macedonia	2	2	0	0	50	38	+12
Netherlands	2	1	1	0	55	48	+7
Norway	5	1	0	4	117	126	−9
Poland	1	1	0	0	24	23	+1
Romania	2	1	0	1	50	53	−3
Russia	2	0	1	1	47	51	−4
Serbia	1	0	1	0	23	23	0
Slovakia	1	0	0	1	31	22	+9
Ukraine	2	2	0	0	57	48	+9
(Socialist Federal Republic of Yugoslavia) Yugoslavia	1	0	0	1	28	31	−3
Total	43	19	4	20	1078	1085	-7

=== Performance in other tournaments ===
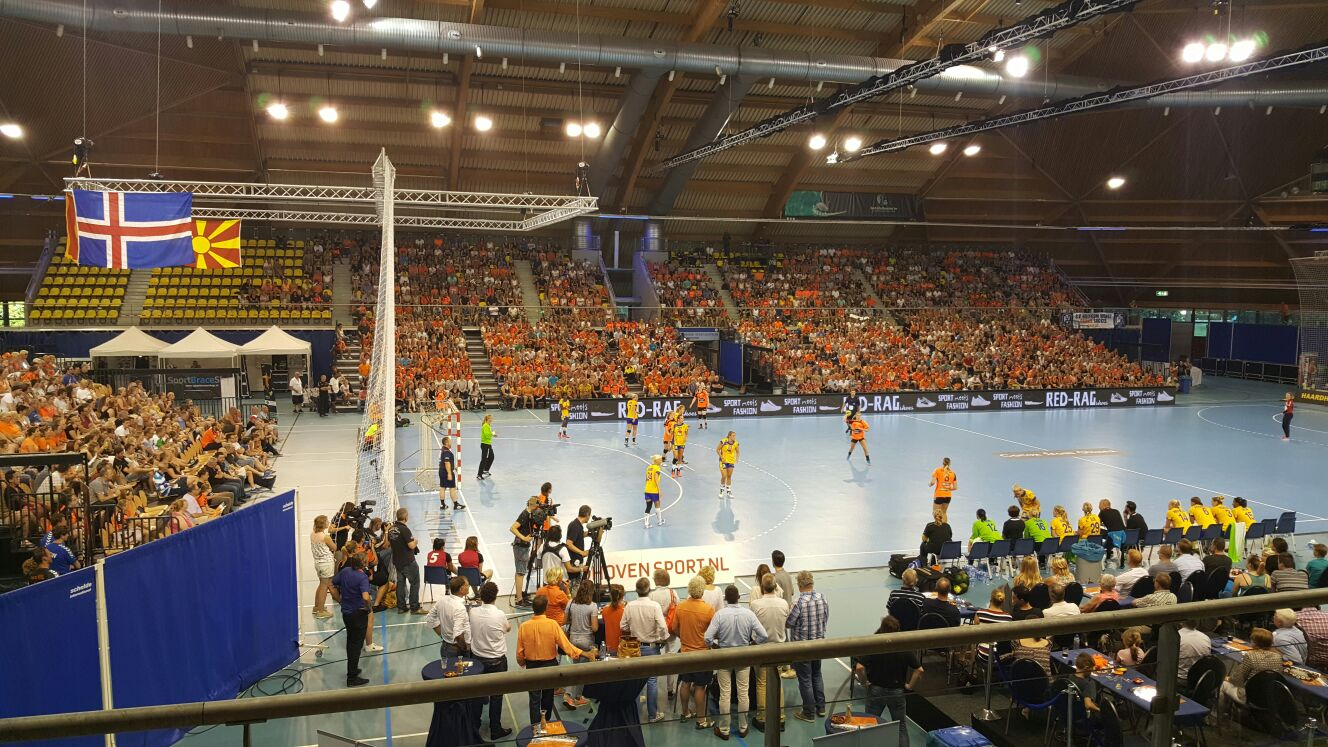
Sweden during a friendly match against the Netherlands in 2016

- Carpathian Trophy 1994 – Third place
- GF World Cup 2006 – Fifth place
- Møbelringen Cup 2001 – Third place
- Møbelringen Cup 2011 – Third place
- Møbelringen Cup 2012 – Fourth place
- Møbelringen Cup 2015 – Third place
- Carpathian Trophy 2015 – Winner

== Team ==
=== Current squad ===
The squad chosen for the 2026 European Women's Handball Championship.

Head coach: Tomas Axnér

Caps and goals as of 2 November 2026.

No.	Pos.	Name	Date of birth (age)	Height	App.	Goals	Club
1	GK	Johanna Bundsen	3 June 1991 (age 35)	1.85 m	184	18	(Denmark) Odense Håndbold
2	LW	Clara Lerby	8 May 1999 (age 27)	1.72 m	42	174	(Denmark) Nykøbing Falster
3	RB	Nina Koppang	31 May 2002 (age 24)	1.77 m	50	87	(Sweden) IK Sävehof
6	LB	Hanna Lundvall	28 June 2006 (age 20)	1.76 m	3	1	(Sweden) Skara HF
10	RW	Mathilda Lundström	20 December 1996 (age 29)	1.64 m	100	145	(Sweden) Skara HF
11	LB	Tyra Axnér	18 March 2002 (age 24)	1.78 m	75	174	(Romania) CSM București
14	P	Isabelle Rydén	26 November 2006 (age 19)	1.78 m	3	2	(Denmark) Nykøbing Falster
17	RB	Nina Dano	12 June 2000 (age 26)	1.72 m	74	126	(Denmark) HØJ Elite
20	GK	Stina Littorin	23 March 2005 (age 21)	1.81 m	5	0	(Denmark) Nordvestjysk Elite
21	GK	Evelina Eriksson	20 August 1996 (age 30)	1.84 m	58	1	(Romania) CS Gloria Bistrița
23	CB	Emma Lindqvist (c)	17 September 1997 (age 29)	1.77 m	129	299	(Denmark) Ikast Håndbold
38	LW	Elin Hansson	7 August 1996 (age 30)	1.73 m	113	273	(Denmark) Team Esbjerg
42	CB	Jenny Carlson	17 April 1995 (age 31)	1.72 m	97	251	(Romania) CSM București
43	P	Emma Olsson	20 August 1997 (age 29)	1.79 m	4	10	(Germany) Borussia Dortmund
49	P	Olivia Löfqvist	13 July 1998 (age 28)	1.77 m	51	58	(Denmark) Team Esbjerg
52	LB	Charité Mumbongo	14 March 2002 (age 24)	1.79 m	13	11	(France) ESBF Besançon
55	RW	Clara Petersson Bergsten	28 May 2002 (age 24)	1.62 m	22	36	(Norway) Molde Elite
77	CB	Emma Wahlström	8 May 2000 (age 26)	1.70 m	3	5	(Denmark) Nordvestjysk Elite

=== Extended squad ===
No.	Pos.	Name	Date of birth (age)	Height	App.	Goals	Club
13	P	Stina Wiksfors	23 August 2004 (age 22)	1.82 m	6	3	(Sweden) IK Sävehof
33	RB	Isabel van Kerkvoorde	27 January 2004 (age 22)	1.74 m	12	13	(Sweden) Skara HF
88	CB	Selma Hestner Olsson	20 February 2007 (age 19)	1.65 m	0	0	(Sweden) Skövde HF
	LW	Klara Bergling	19 March 2006 (age 20)	1.74 m	0	0	(Sweden) IF Hallby

=== Coaching staff ===
Role	Name
Head coach	(Sweden) Tomas Axnér
Assistant coach	(Sweden) Jesper Östlund
Goalkeeping coach	(Sweden) Thomas Forsberg
Doctor	(Sweden) Hampus Lüning
Doctor	(Sweden) Örjan Johannesson
Physiotherapist	(Sweden) Viktoria Karlsson
Physiotherapist	(Sweden) Andreas Blom
Physiotherapist	(Sweden) Marika Hallin Lie
Physiotherapist	(Sweden) Martin Asker
Sports psychological advisor	(Sweden) Malin Tillman
Physical trainer	(Sweden) Rickard Nilsson
Video analysis	(Sweden) Toni Johansson
Head leader	(Sweden) Hanna Fogelström
Team manager	(Sweden) Jerry Hallbäck
Head of media	(Sweden) Daniel Vandor
Head of social media	(Sweden) Hannah Heed
Coordinator	(Sweden) Emma Jannesson
Coordinator	(Sweden) Victoria Pettersson
Coordinator	(Sweden) Carina Edström

=== Notable players ===
Several Swedish players have seen their individual performance recognized at international tournaments, either as Most Valuable Player, top scorer, best defense player or as a member of the All-Star Team.

MVP

- Linnea Torstenson, 2010 European Championship
- Isabelle Gulldén, 2014 European Championship

All-Star Team

- Annika Wiel Fredén, 2006 European Championship
- Nathalie Hagman, 2016 Summer Olympics, 2017 and 2023 World Championship
- Linn Blohm, 2019 and 2023 World Championship
- Jamina Roberts, 2020 Summer Olympics

Top scorers

- Isabelle Gulldén, 2014 European Championship (58 goals)
- Nathalie Hagman, 2021 World Championship (71 goals)

Best defense player

- Johanna Wiberg, 2010 European Championship
- Sabina Jacobsen, 2014 European Championship

Incomplete

=== Famous players ===
- Åsa Eriksson
- Matilda Boson
- Annika Wiel Fredén
- Tina Flognman
- Madeleine Grundström
- Linnea Torstenson
- Nathalie Hagman
- Mia Hermansson-Högdahl
- Isabelle Gulldén
- Sabina Jacobsen

=== Individual all-time records ===
Still active players are highlighted

==== Most matches played ====
Total number of matches played in official competitions only.

#	Player	Matches	Goals
1	Jamina Roberts	273	735
2	Nathalie Hagman	261	1014
3	Åsa Eriksson	254	1108
4	Mia Hermansson-Högdahl	225	1153
4	Tina Flognman	225	388
6	Isabelle Gulldén	224	846
7	Matilda Boson	210	515
8	Linn Blohm	199	583
9	Johanna Bundsen	184	18
10	Kristina Jönsson	183	2

Last updated: 24 October 2026
Source: svenskhandboll.se

==== Most goals scored ====
Total number of goals scored in official matches only.

#	Player	Goals	Matches	Average
1	Mia Hermansson-Högdahl	1153	225	5.12
2	Åsa Eriksson	1108	254	4.36
3	Nathalie Hagman	1014	261	3.89
4	Isabelle Gulldén	846	224	3.77
5	Jamina Roberts	735	273	2.69
6	Linnea Torstenson	655	177	3.70
7	Linn Blohm	583	199	2.93
8	Lina Olsson Rosenberg	535	146	3.66
9	Matilda Boson	515	210	2.45
10	Katarina Arfwidsson	493	132	3.73

Last updated: 12 April 2026
Source: svenskhandboll.se

=== Head coach history ===
Period	Coach
1991–1994; 1999–2003	(Sweden) Tomas Ryde
2003–2005	(Sweden) Per-Olof Jonsson
2005–2008	(Sweden) Ulf Schefvert
2008–2012	(Sweden) Per Johansson
2012–2013	(Sweden) Torbjörn Klingvall
2014–2015; 2016	(Denmark) Helle Thomsen
2015–2016	(Sweden) Thomas Sivertsson
2016–2020	(Sweden) Henrik Signell
2020–present	(Sweden) Tomas Axnér
