= Skövde HF =

Swedish handball club

- Full name: Skövde Handbollsflickor
- Short name: Skövde
- Founded: 1949
- Arena: Arena Skövde, Skövde
- Capacity: 2,500
- President: Tobias Björk
- Head coach: Kasper Gudnitz
- League: Handbollsligan
- 2025–26: 7th
- Club colours
| Home | Away |

Skövde Handbollsflickor is a Swedish women's handball club from Skövde playing in Handbollsligan. Playing in top-flight since 1997, Skövde won its first championship in 2008. In all other seasons since 2005 it has been the championship's runner-up. As such Skövde has been a regular of the EHF Cup since 2007, though it has yet to get past the qualifying stages.

Location of Skövde HF

== Kits ==
HOME
| 2012-13 | 2016-17 | 2017- |

AWAY
| 2012-13 | 2016-17 | 2017- |

== Sports Hall information ==
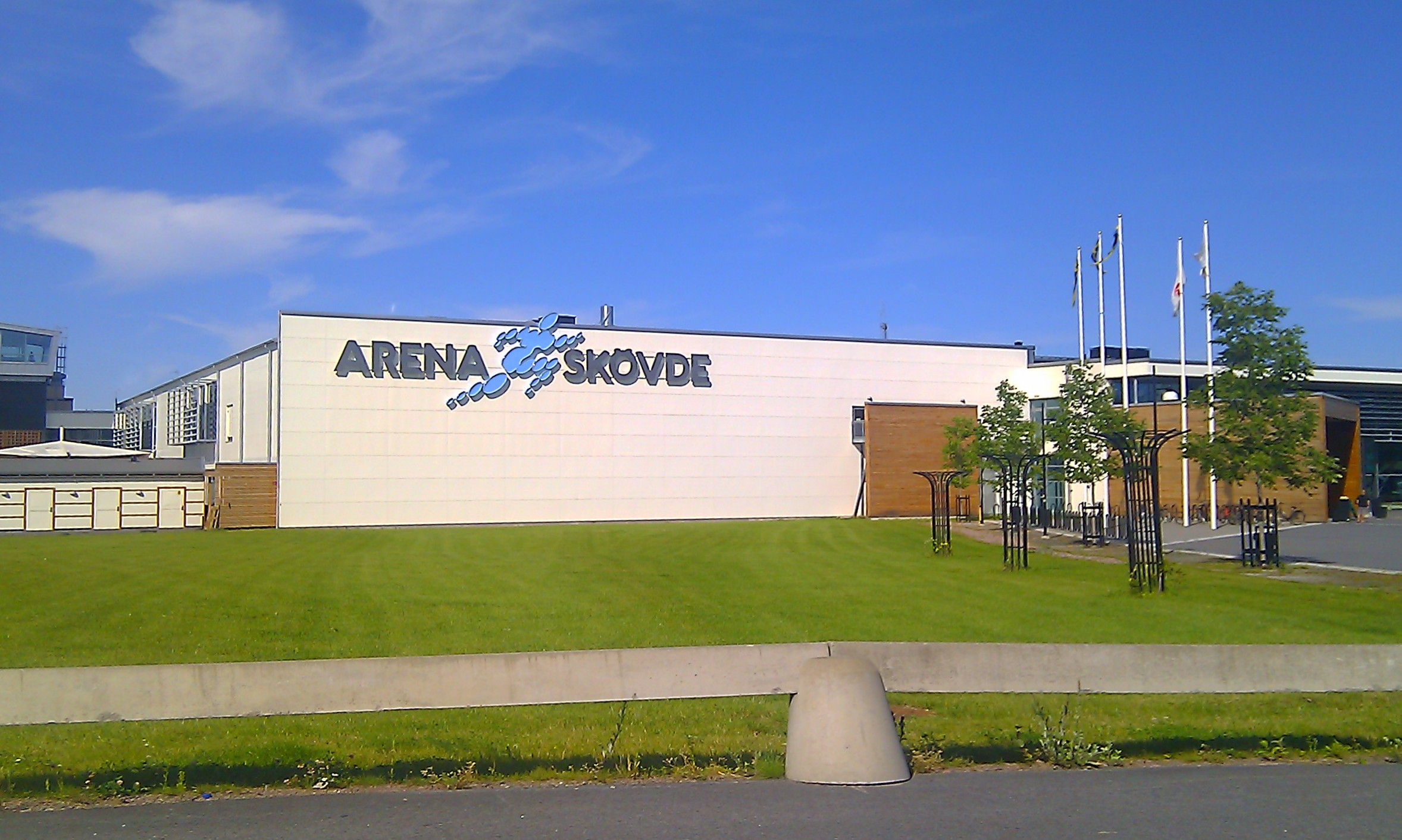
Home hall: Arena Skövde

- Name: – Arena Skövde
- City: – Skövde
- Capacity: – 2500
- Address: – Egnells väg 1, 541 41 Skövde

== Titles ==
- Elitserien
  - 2008

== Team ==
=== Current squad ===
Squad for the 2026–27 season

Goalkeepers

- 1 (Denmark) Sørine Wolf
- 16 (Denmark) Lærke Sørensen

Wingers
LW

- 7 (Sweden) Nora Jakobsson van Stam
- 21 (Sweden) Madeleine Lindgren

RW

- 10 (Sweden) Michaela Ek
- 22 (Sweden) Isabelle Medin Sand

Line players

- 9 (Denmark) Christina Søndergaard Nielsen
- 17 (Sweden) Tilda Redzic
- 24 (Denmark) Caroline Duelund

Back players
LB

- 6 (Sweden) Linnea Nyman
- 11 (Sweden) Natalie Wästefors
- 20 (Sweden) Signe Lindblad
- 23 (Sweden) Verena Oswald

CB

- 8 (Sweden) Ella Larsson Nyqvist
- 13 (Sweden) Tindra Sahlin Wallenius
- 18 (Sweden) Selma Hestner Olsson

RB

- 20 (Sweden) Matilda Antonsson Hjelmmedalje
- 27 (Norway) Mie Rakstad
- 57 (Sweden) Sara Johansson

=== Transfers ===
Transfers for the 2027–28 season

Joining

Leaving
