= Handbollsligan (women) =

Swedish women's handball top division

- Sport: Handball
- Founded: 1951
- No. of teams: 12
- Country: Sweden
- Most recent champion: Skara HF (2025, 1st title)
- Most titles: IK Sävehof (17)
- Level on pyramid: 1
- Relegation to: Allsvenskan
- International cups: Champions League; EHF European League; EHF European Cup
- Website: https://handbollsligan.se/dam/

Handbollsligan is the highest division of women's handball in Sweden. The inaugural Elitserien season took place in 1951, with Kvinnliga IK Sport winning the championship.

The league currently consists of 12 teams. The eight top teams at the end of every season continue to the playoffs, in which the quarterfinals and semifinals are played as a best-of-five series, unlike the final which is played as a single match. The champion is awarded a spot in the EHF Women's Champions League's qualification stage.

Historically, the women's Elitserien was dominated by IK Sävehof, with 17 championships.

For the 2016–2017 season, the name of the league was changed to Svensk Handbollselit. Until then, it was called Elitserien (English: the Elite League) (Swedish: Elitserien i handboll för damer). For the 2023–2024 season it changed name to "Handbollsligan", like the men's league.

== Current season ==
=== Teams for season 2020–21 ===
Location of teams in 2020–21 Svensk Handbollselit (SHE)
- BK Heid
- Boden Handboll IF
- H 65 Höörs HK
- IK Sävehof
- Kristianstad HK
- Kungälvs HK
- Lugi HF
- Önnereds HK
- Skara HF
- Skövde HF
- Skuru IK
- VästeråsIrsta HF

== List of Swedish Champions in women's handball ==
- 1951 Kvinnliga IK Sport
- 1952 Kvinnliga IK Sport
- 1953 Kvinnliga IK Sport
- 1954 Kvinnliga IK Sport
- 1955 Kvinnliga IK Sport
- 1956 IF Guif
- 1957 Kvinnliga IK Sport
- 1958 Kvinnliga IK Sport
- 1959 Kvinnliga IK Sport
- 1960 Kvinnliga IK Sport
- 1961 Kvinnliga IK Sport
- 1962 IK Ymer
- 1963 IK Bolton
- 1964 Kvinnliga IK Sport
- 1965 IK Bolton
- 1966 IK Bolton
- 1967 IK Bolton
- 1968 IK Bolton
- 1969 Kvinnliga IK Sport
- 1970 Borlänge HK
- 1971 Kvinnliga IK Sport
- 1972 Kvinnliga IK Sport
- 1973 Borlänge HK
- 1974 Stockholmspolisens IF
- 1975 Stockholmspolisens IF
- 1976 Stockholmspolisens IF
- 1977 Stockholmspolisens IF
- 1978 Borlänge HK
- 1979 Stockholmspolisens IF
- 1980 Stockholmspolisens IF
- 1981 Stockholmspolisens IF
- 1982 Stockholmspolisens IF
- 1983 Stockholmspolisens IF
- 1984 Stockholmspolisens IF
- 1985 Stockholmspolisens IF
- 1986 Irsta HF
- 1987 Tyresö HF
- 1988 Tyresö HF
- 1989 Tyresö HF
- 1990 Stockholmspolisens IF
- 1991 Irsta HF
- 1992 Skånela IF
- 1993 IK Sävehof
- 1994 Sävsjö HK
- 1995 Sävsjö HK
- 1996 Sävsjö HK
- 1997 HP Warta
- 1998 Sävsjö HK
- 1999 Sävsjö HK
- 2000 IK Sävehof
- 2001 Skuru IK
- 2002 Eslövs IK
- 2003 Eslövs IK
- 2004 Skuru IK
- 2005 Skuru IK
- 2006 IK Sävehof
- 2007 IK Sävehof
- 2008 Skövde HF
- 2009 IK Sävehof
- 2010 IK Sävehof
- 2011 IK Sävehof
- 2012 IK Sävehof
- 2013 IK Sävehof
- 2014 IK Sävehof
- 2015 IK Sävehof
- 2016 IK Sävehof
- 2017 H 65 Höör
- 2018 IK Sävehof
- 2019 IK Sävehof
- 2020 No champion due to COVID-19.
- 2021 Skuru IK
- 2022 IK Sävehof
- 2023 IK Sävehof
- 2024 IK Sävehof
- 2025 Skara HF

=== EHF league ranking ===
EHF League Ranking for 2022/23 season:

- 9. (8) (Germany) Handball-Bundesliga Frauen (56.33)
- 10. (11) (Slovenia) 1. A DRL
- 11. (10) (Sweden) SHE Women (37.40)
- 12. (13) (Poland) PGNiG Superliga (33.00)
- 13. (12) (Czech Republic) Extraliga (31.50)
