= Anne Mette Hansen =

Danish handball player (born 1994)

Personal information
- Nationality: Danish
- Born: 25 August 1994 (age 32) Glostrup, Denmark
- Height: 1.85 m (6 ft 1 in)

Sport
- Sport: Handball
- Position: Left back
- Current club: CSM București
- Number: 88

Youth career
- Years: Team
- –: FHH90
- 2010–2013: Ajax København

Senior clubs
- Years: Team
- 2012–2014: Ajax København
- 2014–2017: København Håndbold
- 2017–2023: Győri ETO KC
- 2023–2025: Metz Handball
- 2025–: CSM București
National team
| Years | Team | Apps | (Gls) |
| 2013– | Denmark | 207 | (603) |
Medal record
Olympic Games
| Bronze medal – third place | 2024 Paris | Team |
World Championship
| Bronze medal – third place | 2013 Serbia |
| Bronze medal – third place | 2021 Spain |
| Bronze medal – third place | 2023 Denmark/Norway/Sweden |
European Championship
| Silver medal – second place | 2022 Slovenia/North Macedonia/Montenegro |
| Silver medal – second place | 2024 Austria/Hungary/Switzerland |
Youth World Championship
| Gold medal – first place | 2012 Montenegro |
European Junior Championship
| Bronze medal – third place | 2013 Denmark |
European Youth Championship
| Silver medal – second place | 2011 Czech Republic |
- Updated on 27 September 2026

Anne Mette Hansen (born 25 August 1994) is a Danish handball player for CSM București and the Danish national team. With over 200 caps, she is the 5th most capped player for the Danish national team ever.

== National team career ==
She debuted for the Danish national team on 27 October 2013, and the same year she represented Denmark at the 2013 World Women's Handball Championship in Serbia, where the Danish team won bronze medals beating Poland in the third place playoff 30–26. She has been a mainstay on the national setup since. Since then she has won two additional bronze medals in 2021 and 2023.

At the 2024 Olympics she won another bronze medal. Later the same year, she won silver medals at the 2024 European Championship, losing to Norway in the final.

At the 2025 World Women's Handball Championship Denmark went out in the quarterfinal to France after winning all matches in the group stages. The Danish team was affected by a lot of players missing the tournament including goalkeepers Sandra Toft and Althea Reinhardt and pivots Sarah Iversen and Rikke Iversen. This was the first time since 2019 that Denmark left a major international tournament without any medals. In the quarterfinal against France Hansen only scored a single goal in the 59th minute when the match had already been decided.

== Club career ==
Anne Mette Hansen started playing handball at the age of 10 at FHH90. In 2010 she went to Københavns Idrætsefterskole (KIES) while at the same time switching to Ajax København. Here she made her senior league debut in the Danish 1st Division (second tier) in 2014, before signing her first professional contract with København Håndbold. She played at København Håndbold for three years before moving to Hungarian side Győri Audi ETO KC at the age of 22. She played with Győri for 6 years, where she won EHF Champions League two times in a row in 2018 and 2019.

In 2023 she switched to the French league champions Metz Handball. She said regarding the transfer, that she look forward to playing alongside national team colleagues Kristina Jørgensen and Louise Burgaard.

== Achievements ==
- EHF Champions League:
  - Winner: 2018, 2019
- European Junior Championship:
  - Bronze Medalist: 2013
- Nemzeti Bajnokság I
  - Gold Medalist: 2018, 2019, 2022, 2023
- Magyar Kupa:
  - Winner: 2018, 2019, 2021

== Individual awards ==
- All-Star Left Back of the European Junior Championship: 2013
- All-Star Left Back of the EHF Champions League: 2019
- Youth player of the Year in Damehåndboldligaen: 2013/14
