= Trine Østergaard =

Danish handball player (born 1991)

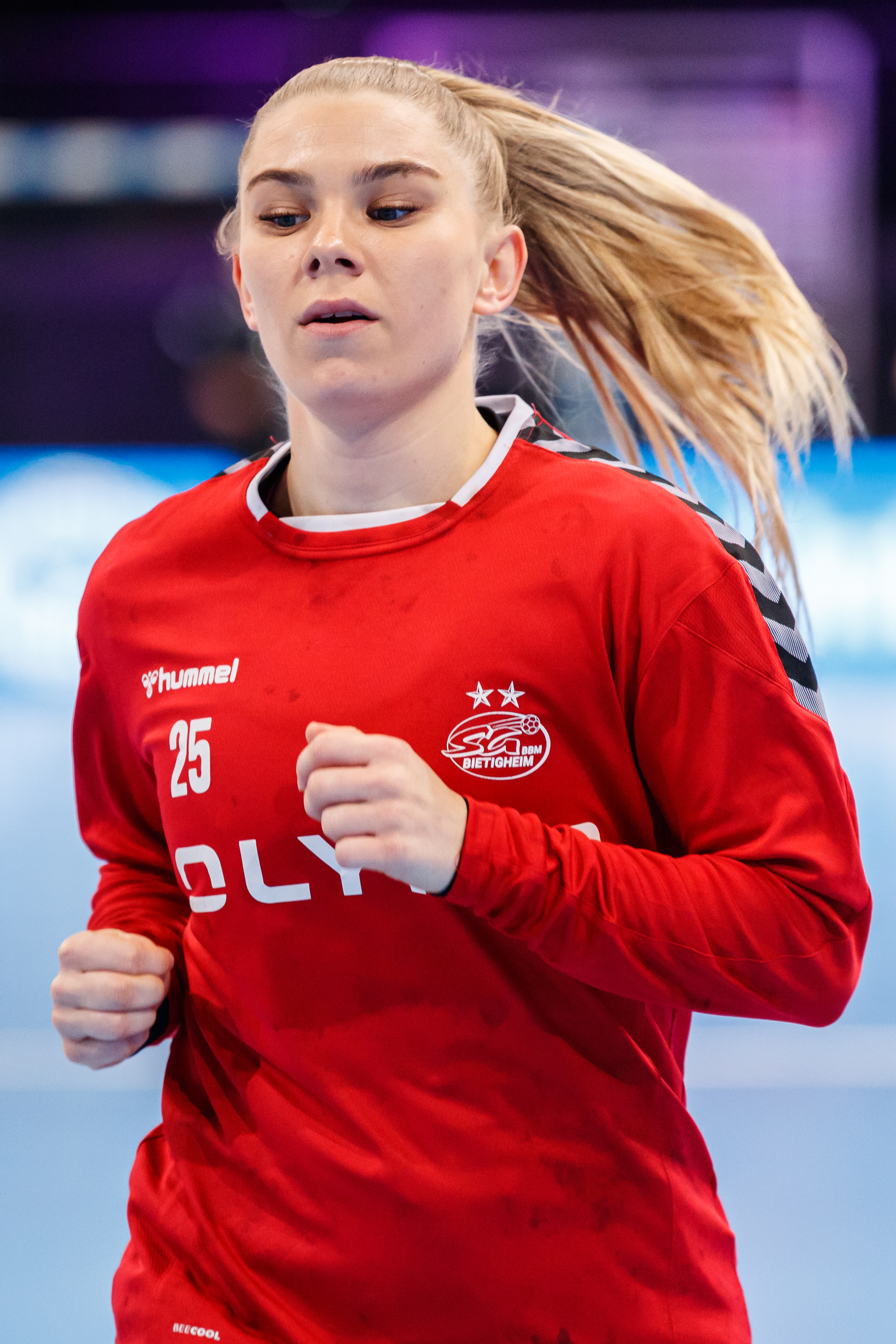
- Østergaard in 2021

Personal information
- Full name: Trine Østergaard Jensen
- Nationality: Danish
- Born: 17 October 1991 (age 35) Skanderborg, Denmark
- Height: 1.65 m (5 ft 5 in)

Sport
- Sport: Handball
- Position: Right wing
- Current club: Viborg HK
- Number: 25

Youth career
- Years: Team
- –: Galten FS
- –: Team Ikast

Senior clubs
- Years: Team
- 2008–2017: FCM Håndbold
- 2017–2020: Odense Håndbold
- 2020–2023: SG BBM Bietigheim
- 2023–2026: CSM București
- 2026–: Viborg HK
National team
Years	Team	Apps	(Gls)
2011–	Denmark	220	(454)
Medal record
Olympic Games
Bronze medal – third place	2024 Paris	Team
World Championship
Bronze medal – third place	2013 Serbia
Bronze medal – third place	2021 Spain
Bronze medal – third place	2023 Denmark/Norway/Sweden
European Championship
Silver medal – second place	2022 Slovenia/North Macedonia/Montenegro
Silver medal – second place	2024 Austria/Hungary/Switzerland
- Updated on 12 April 2026

Trine Østergaard Jensen (born 17 October 1991) is a Danish handball player for Viborg HK and the Danish national team. Østergaard is the captain of the Danish national team, and is the 4th most capped player ever on the Danish national team with 214 caps (as of December 2025).

== Career ==
=== Club career ===
Østergaard started playing handball at the local club Galten FS, before switching to Team Ikasts youth team. Her league debut was with Ikast-Brande EH in 2008. With Ikast-Brande (later FC Midtjylland) she won several trophies, including the 2015 Danish League.

In 2017, she switched to league rivals Odense Håndbold, where she played for three years before switching to the German club SG BBM Bietigheim in the summer of 2020. Here she played three seasons as the first choice right wing. She won the Bundesliga twice in 2022 and 2023 and the 2021–22 Women's EHF European League.

In the summer of 2023, she switched to Romanian top club CSM București. In her first two seasons she won the domestic treble both years.

In October 2025 she activated a clause in her contract, that allowed her to switch clubs and return to Denmark. She then signed a contract with Viborg HK from the 2026–27 season.

=== National team ===
Østergaard debuted for the Danish national team in 2011 against Russia. She was part of the brutto squad for the 2012 European Women's Handball Championship but in the end, she did not make the final squad. She made her first major international tournament at the 2013 World Women's Handball Championship, where she played the most minutes of any Danish player. The Danish team won bronze medals, breaking a 9-year streak without medals for the Danish team. They beat Poland 30–26 in the third place play off.

She represented Denmark at the 2013 World Women's Handball Championship, at the 2014 European Women's Handball Championship and at the 2015 World Women's Handball Championship.

Since then she has won 3 World cup bronze medals and a European Championship silver medal. At the 2024 Olympics she won another bronze medals. Later the same year, she won silver medals at the 2024 European Championship, losing to Norway in the final. Before the tournament she was appointed captain of the Danish national team.

At the 2025 World Women's Handball Championship Denmark went out in the quarterfinal to France after winning all matches in the group stages. The Danish team was affected by a lot of players missing the tournament including goalkeepers Sandra Toft and Althea Reinhardt and pivots Sarah Iversen and Rikke Iversen. This was the first time since 2019 that Denmark left a major international tournament without any medals.

== Achievements ==
=== International competitions ===
- EHF European League:
  - Winner: 2011, 2022
- EHF Cup Winners' Cup:
  - Winner: 2015

=== Domestic competitions ===
- Danish Championship:
  - Winner: 2011, 2013, 2015
- Danish Cup:
  - Winner: 2012, 2014, 2020
- Bundesliga:
  - Winner: 2022, 2023
- Romanian League
  - Winner: 2023–24, 2024–25
- Cupa României
  - Winner: 2024, 2025
- Supercupa României
  - Winner: 2024, 2025

== Individual awards ==
- Danish League Best Right Wing: 2015
