= Line Haugsted =

Danish handball player (born 1994)

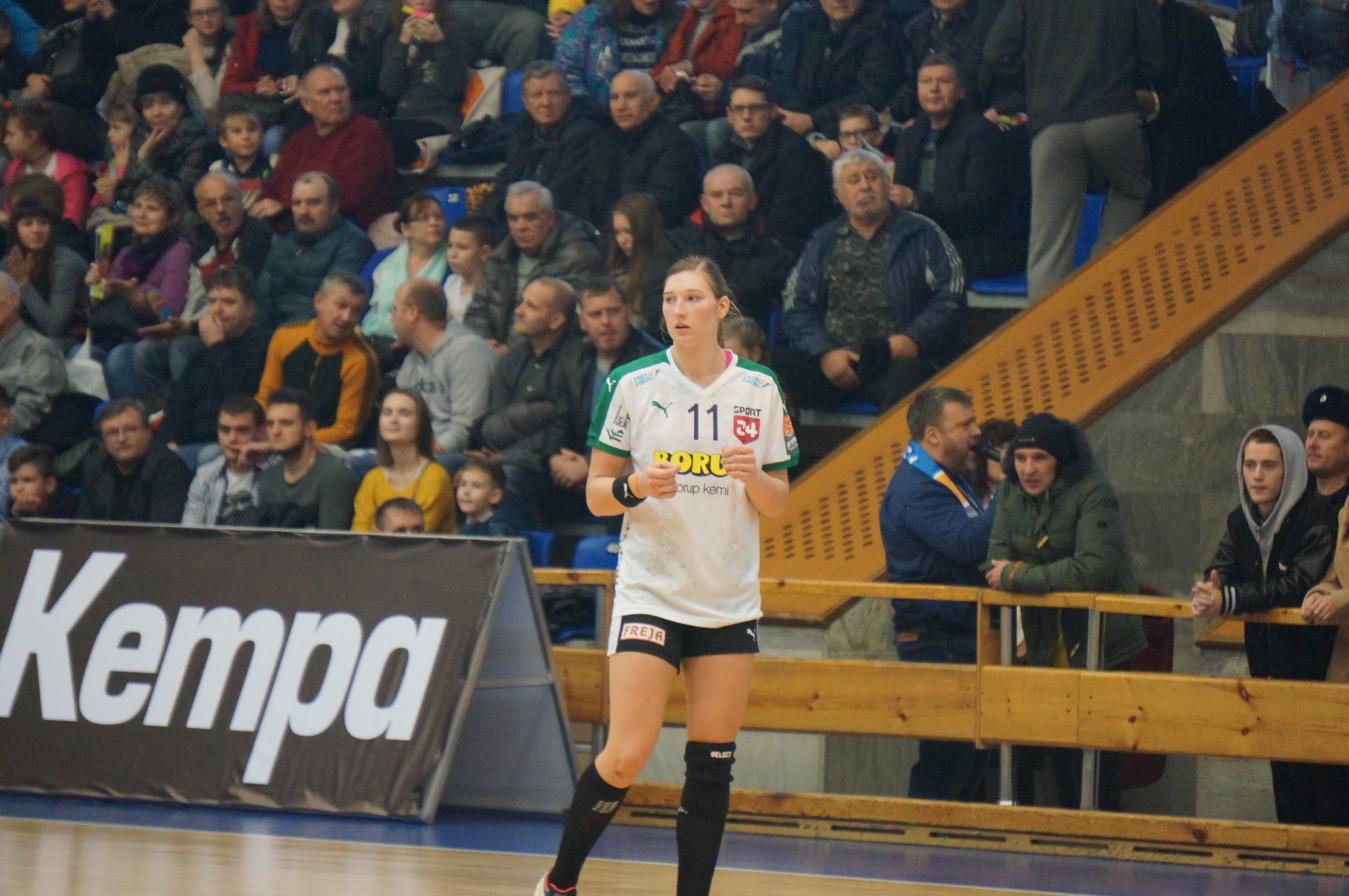
- Haugsted in 2016

Personal information
- Nationality: Danish
- Born: 11 November 1994 (age 31) Skive, Denmark
- Height: 1.80 m (5 ft 11 in)

Sport
- Sport: Handball
- Position: Left back
- Current club: Team Esbjerg
- Number: 2

Youth career
- Years: Team
- 2009–2011: Skive fH

Senior clubs
- Years: Team
- 2011–2012: FC Midtjylland
- 2012–2015: Skive fH
- 2015–2016: Odense Håndbold
- 2016–2022: Viborg HK
- 2022–2024: Győri ETO KC
- 2024–: Team Esbjerg
National team
Years	Team	Apps	(Gls)
2016–	Denmark	130	(155)
Medal record
Olympic Games
Bronze medal – third place	2024 Paris	Team
World Championship
Bronze medal – third place	2021 Spain
Bronze medal – third place	2023 Denmark/Norway/Sweden
European Championship
Silver medal – second place	2024 Austria/Hungary/Switzerland
IHF Junior World Championship
Bronze medal – third place	2014 Croatia
IHF Youth World Championship
Gold medal – first place	2012 Montenegro
European Junior Championship
Bronze medal – third place	2013 Denmark
- Updated on 12 April 2026

Line Haugsted (born 11 November 1994) is a Danish professional handball player for Team Esbjerg and the Danish national team.

== Career ==
Haugsted started playing handball at the age of 10 at Skive fH. In 2010 she switched to FC Midtjylland Håndbold, where she played for two years before returning to Skive fH. In 2012 she won the Danish youth League with FC Midtjyllands U-18 team. After three seasons where she broke through to the first team at Skive fH, she signed a three-year contract with Odense HC. She would end up playing only one season at Odense, but in that season she was the club top scorer with 57. After a season at Odense she transferred to Viborg HK. Here she won her first senior medals, when the club won silver in the 2020–21 Damehåndboldligaen. On 30 January 2022, it was announced that Haugsted had signed a 2-year contract with Hungarian top club Győri ETO KC. Here she won the Hungarian league title in her first year. After a little more than a year, she returned to Danish handball to join Team Esbjerg.

She made her debut on the Danish national team on 28 November 2014, against Norway. She participated at the 2016 European Women's Handball Championship in Sweden. She represented Denmark at the 2021 World Women's Handball Championship in Spain and at the 2023 World Women's Handball Championship at home, where Denmark won bronze medals on both occasions. At the 2024 Olympics she won a bronze medal. Later the same year, she won silver medals at the 2024 European Championship, losing to Norway in the final. At the 2025 World Women's Handball Championship Denmark went out in the quarterfinal to France after winning all matches in the group stages. The Danish team was affected by a lot of players missing the tournament including goalkeepers Sandra Toft and Althea Reinhardt and pivots Sarah Iversen and Rikke Iversen. This was the first time since 2019 that Denmark left a major international tournament without any medals.

== Achievements ==
- Hungarian Championship
  - Winner: 2023
- Danish Championship:
  - Winner: 2026
  - Silver Medalist: 2021, 2025
  - Bronze Medalist: 2018, 2020
- EHF Champions League:
  - Winner: 2024
  - Bronze Medalist: 2025
- Women's EHF European League:
  - Finalist: 2022

== Individual awards ==
- All-Star Best Defense Player of the European Championship: 2020
- EHF Excellence Awards: Pivot of the Season 2023/24
- Youth player of the Year in Damehåndboldligaen: 2012/13
