= Helena Elver =

Danish handball player (born 1998)

Personal information
- Full name: Helena Elver Hagesø
- Nationality: Danish
- Born: 1 March 1998 (age 28) Copenhagen, Denmark
- Height: 1.68 m (5 ft 6 in)

Sport
- Sport: Handball
- Position: Centre back
- Current club: Győri ETO KC
- Number: 68

Youth career
- Years: Team
- 2015–2017: Hellerup IK

Senior clubs
- Years: Team
- 2017–2018: Gudme HK
- 2018–2020: Aarhus United
- 2020–2025: Odense Håndbold
- 2025–2027: Győri ETO KC
- 2027–: Odense Håndbold
National team
| Years | Team | Apps | (Gls) |
| 2019– | Denmark | 62 | (148) |
Medal record
Olympic Games
| Bronze medal – third place | 2024 Paris | Team |
World Championship
| Bronze medal – third place | 2023 Denmark/Norway/Sweden |
European Championship
| Silver medal – second place | 2024 Austria/Hungary/Switzerland |
Youth World Championship
| Silver medal – second place | 2016 Slovakia |
Youth European Championship
| Gold medal – first place | 2015 U-17 Macedonia |

Helena Elver Hagesø (born 1 March 1998) is a Danish handball player for Győri ETO KC and the Danish national team.

== National team ==
She made her debut on the Danish national team on 27 July 2019.

She also represented Denmark in the 2015 European Women's U-17 Handball Championship in Macedonia, leading to the trophy. Elver won the best player of the tournament award. The year later she won silver medals at IHF Women's Youth World Championship 2016 in Slovakia

Her first medals for the senior national team came at the 2023 World Women's Handball Championship, when Denmark won bronze medals. At the 2024 Olympics she won another bronze medals. Later the same year, she won silver medals at the 2024 European Championship, losing to Norway in the final.

At the 2025 World Women's Handball Championship Denmark went out in the quarterfinal to France after winning all matches in the group stages. The Danish team was affected by a lot of players missing the tournament including goalkeepers Sandra Toft and Althea Reinhardt and pivots Sarah Iversen and Rikke Iversen. This was the first time since 2019 that Denmark left a major international tournament without any medals. In the quarterfinal against France Elver only scored a single goal.

== Career ==
Elver started her career in 2015 at Hellerup IK. In 2017 she switched to the 1st division (second tier) club Gudme HK. She did however miss a large part of season due to cruciate ligament injury. She played here for a year before switching to top flight team Aarhus United.

Two years later she joined Danish top club Odense Håndbold. In 2020 she missed the 2020 European Women's Handball Championship due to her second cruciate ligament injury. In 2021 she would suffer her third ligament injury.

She has won the Danish league twice with Odense Håndbold; in 2020/2021 and 2021/2022. In the 2024-25 season, she achieved a perfect regular season with Odense Håndbold, winning 26 of 26 games. Later the same season she won the Danish Championship, when Odense beat Team Esbjerg in the final 2–1 in matches.

In the summer of 2025 she joined Hungarian top club Győri ETO KC on a two-year deal.

== Achievements ==
- EHF Champions League:
  - Silver: 2025
- Danish League:
  - Gold: 2025
- Youth World Championship:
  - Silver Medalist: 2016
- Youth European Championship:
  - Silver Medalist: 2015

== Individual awards ==
- Most Valuable Player of the EHF European Under-17 Championship: 2015
- Danish national team player of the year: 2026
