= Elma Halilcevic =

Danish handball player (born 2000)

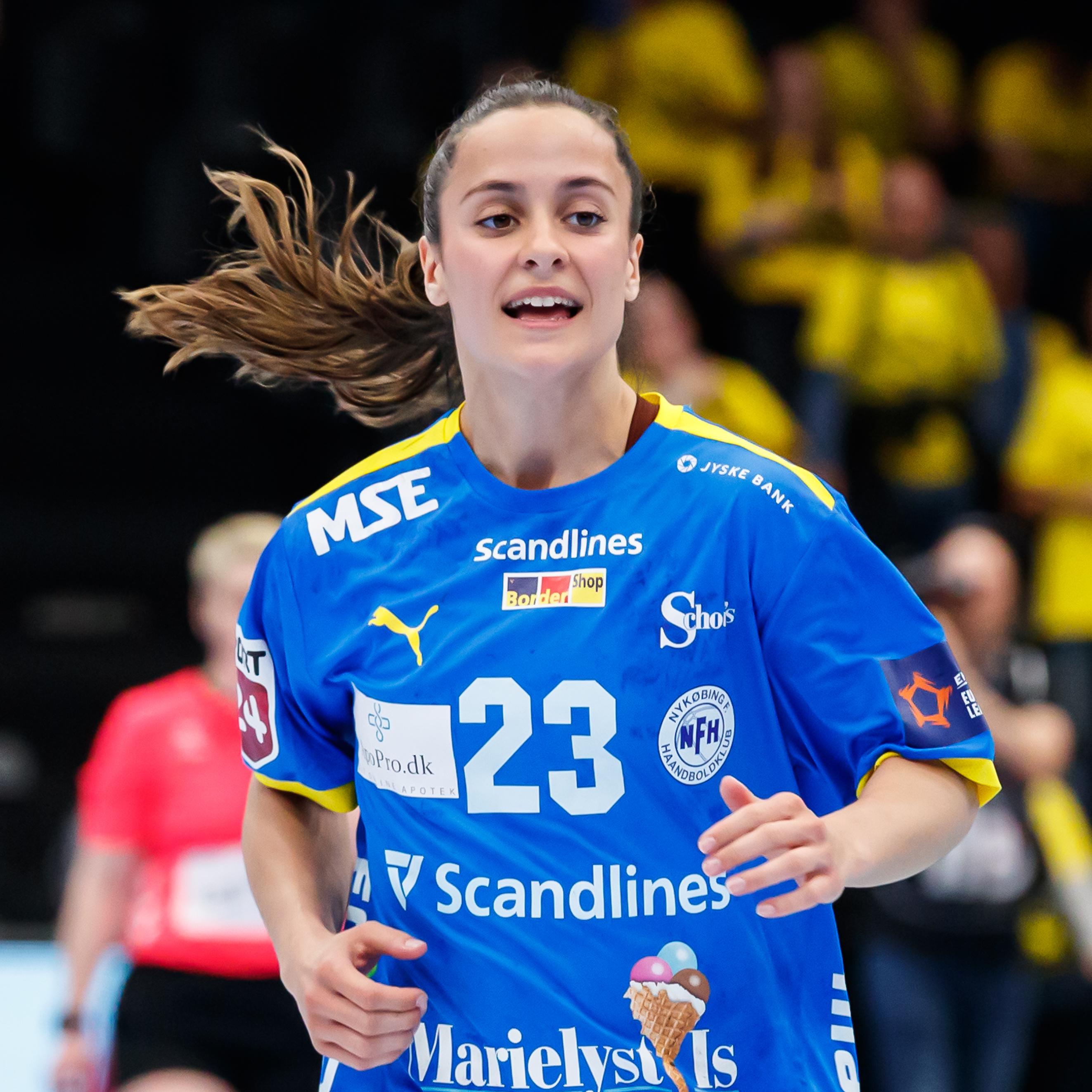
- Halilcevic in the 2023 European League for NFH

Personal information
- Nationality: Danish
- Born: 18 June 2000 (age 26) Esbjerg, Denmark
- Height: 1.68 m (5 ft 6 in)

Sport
- Sport: Handball
- Position: Left wing
- Current club: Odense Håndbold
- Number: 20

Youth career
- Years: Team
- 2016–2018: Team Esbjerg

Senior clubs
- Years: Team
- 2017–2021: Team Esbjerg
- 2021–2023: Nykøbing Falster Håndboldklub
- 2023–: Odense Håndbold
National team
Years	Team	Apps	(Gls)
2021–	Denmark	56	(141)
Medal record
World Championship
Bronze medal – third place	2023 Denmark/Norway/Sweden
European Championship
Silver medal – second place	2022 Slovenia/North Macedonia/Montenegro
Silver medal – second place	2024 Austria/Hungary/Switzerland
European Youth Olympic Festival
Bronze medal – third place	2017 Győr
- Updated on 12 April 2026

Elma Halilcevic (born 18 June 2000) is a Danish handball player of Bosnian descent. She currently plays for Odense Håndbold and the Danish national team.

== Career ==
She started her career at Team Esbjerg, where she made her senior debut in May 2018. With Esbjerg she won the Danish Championship twice, before she then joined Nykøbing Falster Håndboldklub.

In 2023 she joined Odense Håndbold on a deal until 2026. In the 2024-25 season, she achieved a perfect regular season with Odense Håndbold, winning 26 of 26 games. Later they won the Danish Championship, beating Team Esbjerg 2–1 in the final. She also won the 2025 Danish Cup, where she was named tournament MVP (årets pokalfighter). In December 2025 she extended her contract with Odense until 2028.

=== National team ===
Halilcevic represented Denmark in the 2018 Women's Youth World Handball Championship and in the 2019 Women's Junior European Handball Championship, placing 6th both times.

She debuted for the Danish National Team in April 2021. Before playing for Denmark, she was contacted by the Bosnian national team and was offered to represent them instead. But said no, as she always wanted to represent Denmark. She represented Denmark at the 2021 World Women's Handball Championship in Spain and at the 2023 World Women's Handball Championship at home. At the 2022 European Championship, she won silver medals. She did however not see much playing time. At the 2024 Olympics she won a bronze medal. Later the same year, she won silver medals at the 2024 European Championship, losing to Norway in the final. She was however not part of the initial team and did only play for matches.

At the 2025 World Women's Handball Championship she was the Danish first choice on the left wing together with Emma Friis. Denmark went out in the quarterfinal to France after winning all matches in the group stages. The Danish team was affected by a lot of players missing the tournament including goalkeepers Sandra Toft and Althea Reinhardt and pivots Sarah Iversen and Rikke Iversen. This was the first time since 2019 that Denmark left a major international tournament without any medals.

== Achievements ==
- Danish Championship:
  - Winner: 2019, 2020, 2025
- EHF Champions League:
  - Silver: 2025

== Gallery ==
Elma Halilcevic's shot has been stopped by Yara ten Holte in 2023

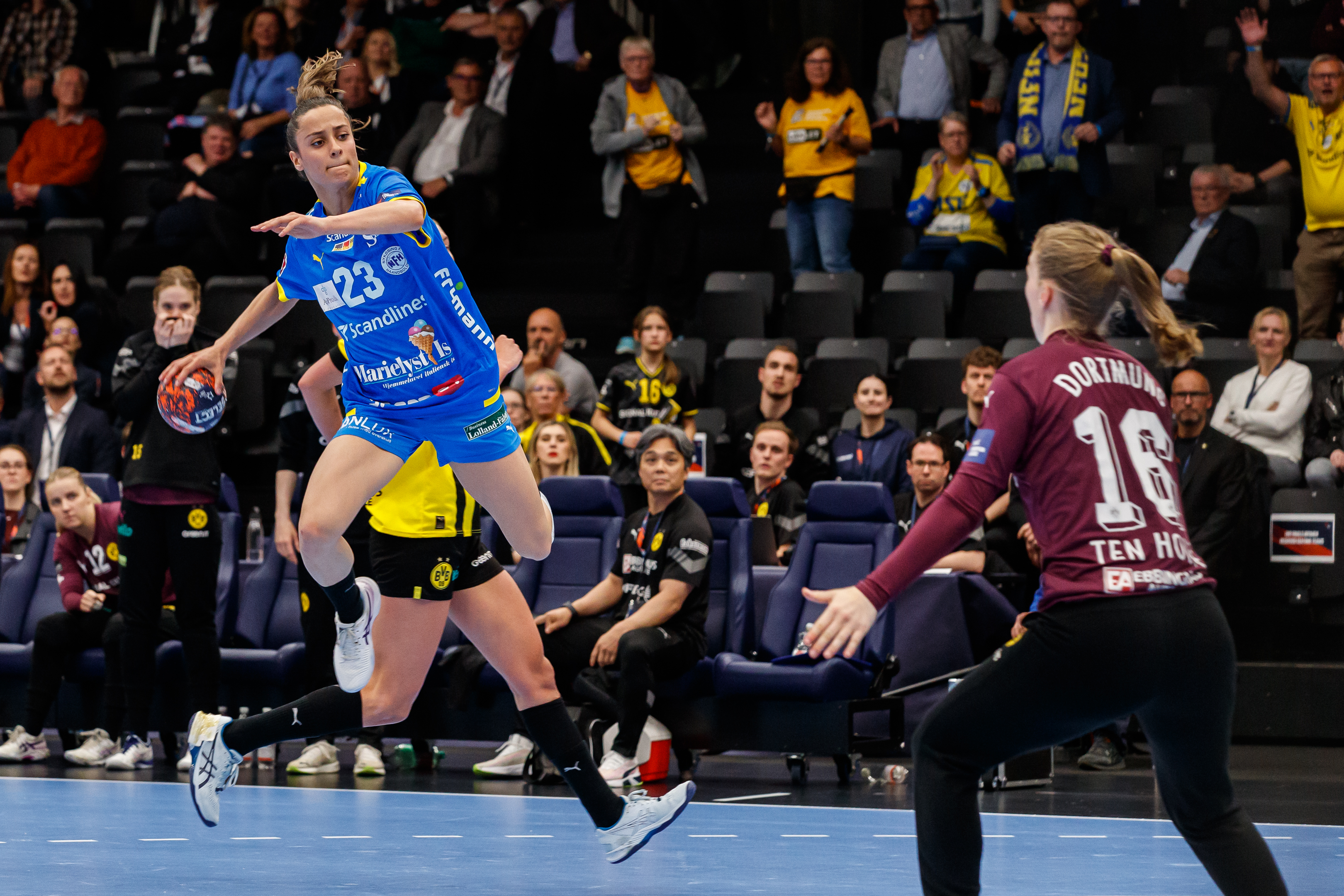

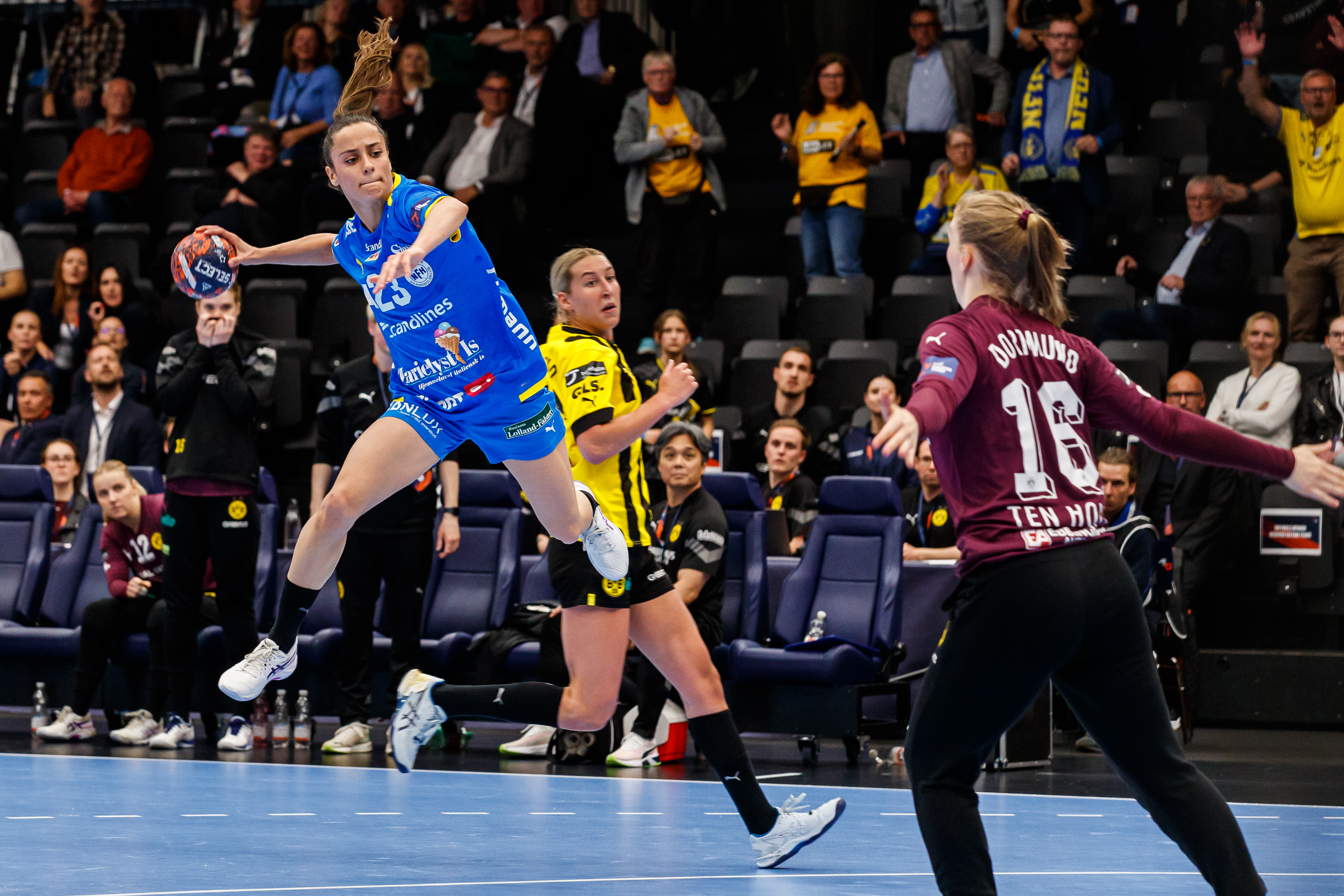

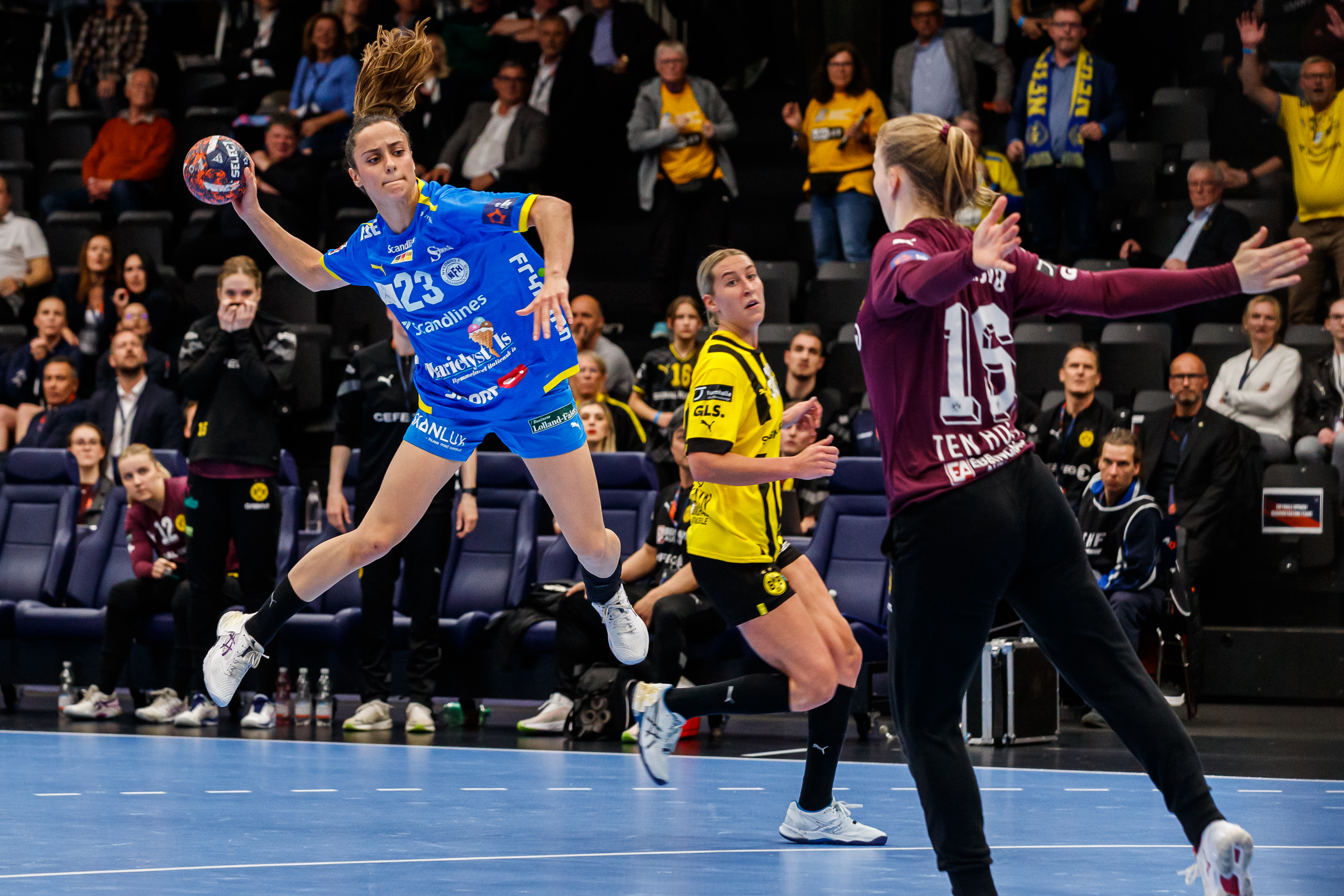

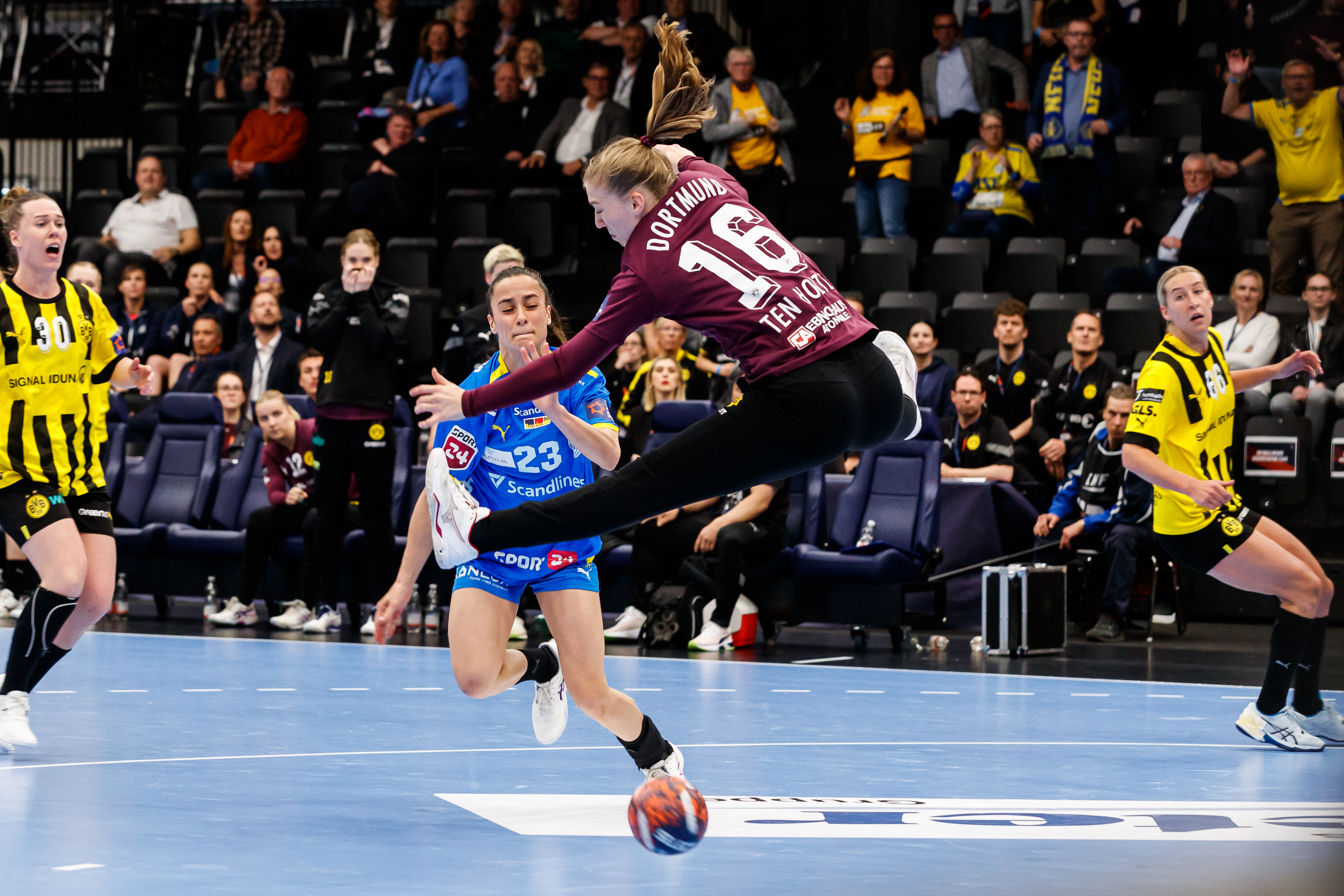

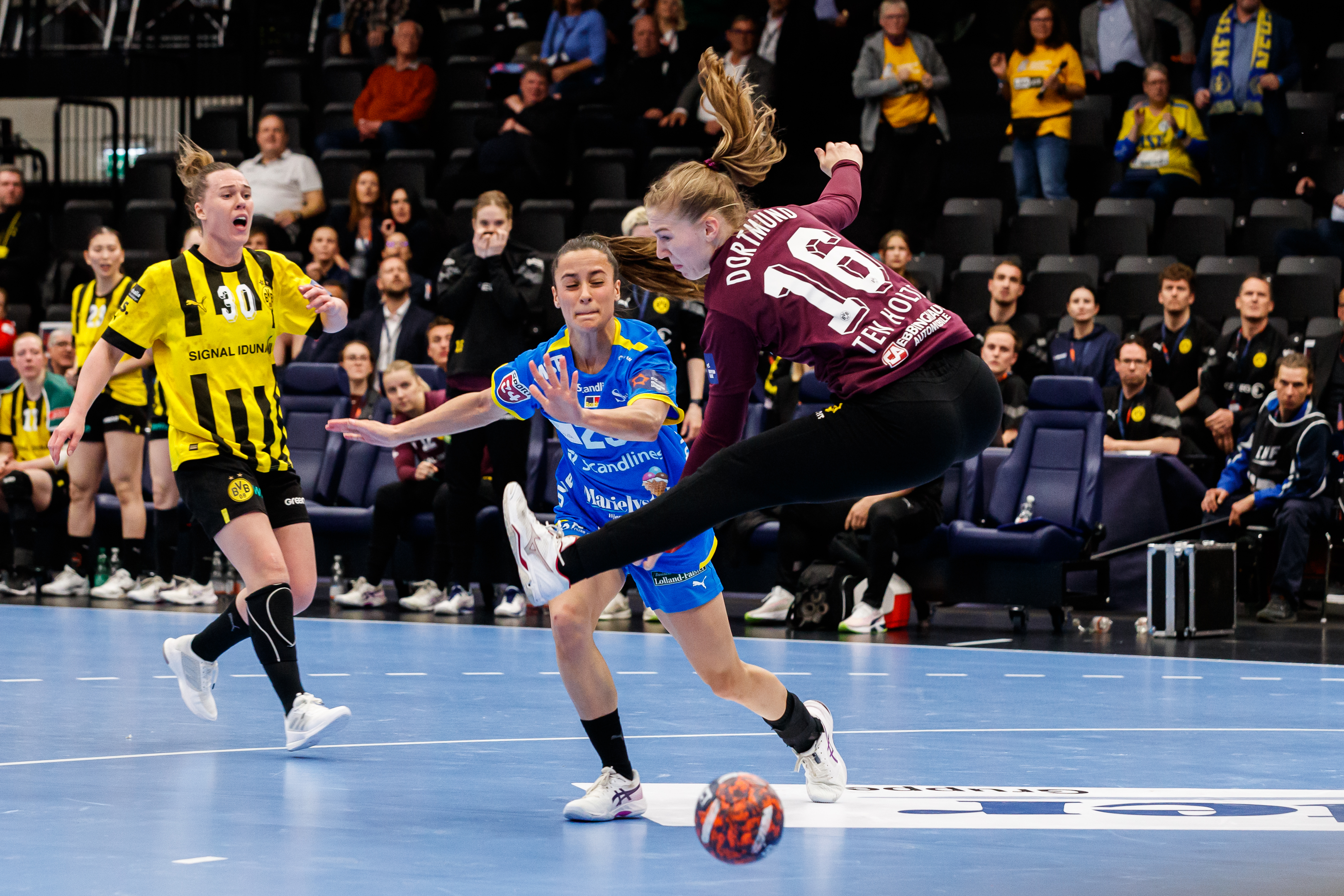
