= Andrea Aagot =

Danish handball player (born 2000)

Personal information
- Full name: Andrea Ulrika Aagot Hansen
- Nationality: Danish
- Born: 22 May 2000 (age 26) Frederiksberg, Denmark
- Height: 1.78 m (5 ft 10 in)

Sport
- Sport: Handball
- Position: Right wing
- Current club: Odense Håndbold
- Number: 34

Senior clubs
- Years: Team
- 2017–2023: København Håndbold
- 2023–: Odense Håndbold
National team
| Years | Team | Apps | (Gls) |
| 2020– | Denmark | 66 | (141) |
Medal record
World Championship
| Bronze medal – third place | 2023 Denmark/Norway/Sweden |
European Championship
| Silver medal – second place | 2022 Slovenia/North Macedonia/Montenegro |
| Silver medal – second place | 2024 Austria/Hungary/Switzerland |

Andrea Ulrika Aagot Hansen (born 22 May 2000) is a Danish female handball player for Odense Håndbold and the Danish national team.

== Career ==
Aagot made her prossional debut at København in 2018, and already in January 2018 she signed a 4-year contract at the club. Until the 2019/2020 season, she shared playing time with the Dutch Debbie Bont, but afterwards she was the undisputed starter. She transferred to Odense Håndbold in 2023. In the 2024–25 season, she achieved a perfect regular season with Odense Håndbold, winning 26 of 26 games. Later the same season she won the Danish Championship, when Odense beat Team Esbjerg in the final 2–1 in matches.

She is a penalty throw specialist.

=== National team ===
She made her debut on the Danish national team on 1 October 2020, against Norway.

She represented Denmark at the 2020 European Women's Handball Championship. Her first medals for the senior national team came at the 2022 European Women's Handball Championship, when Denmark won silver medals. A year later she won bronze medals at the 2023 World Women's Handball Championship. At the 2024 Olympics she won a bronze medal. Later the same year, she won silver medals at the 2024 European Championship, losing to Norway in the final.

At the 2025 World Women's Handball Championship Denmark went out in the quarterfinal to France after winning all matches in the group stages. The Danish team was affected by a lot of players missing the tournament including goalkeepers Sandra Toft and Althea Reinhardt and pivots Sarah Iversen and Rikke Iversen. This was the first time since 2019 that Denmark left a major international tournament without any medals.

She uses Aagot as her surname when she plays handball.

== Achievements ==
- Danish Handball League:
  - Winner: 2018, 2025
- EHF Champions League:
  - Silver: 2025
