= Kamilla Larsen =

Danish handball player (born 1983)

Personal information
- Full name: Kamilla Birkedal Larsen
- Nationality: Danish
- Born: 2 September 1983 (age 43) Jyderup, Denmark
- Height: 1.85 m (6 ft 1 in)

Sport
- Sport: Handball
- Position: Line player
- Current club: Odense Håndbold
- Number: 18

Senior clubs
- Years: Team
- 2001–2007: Slagelse DT
- 2007–2009: GOG Svendborg TGI
- 2009–2022: Odense Håndbold
National team
Years	Team	Apps	(Gls)
2005–2011	Denmark	99	(157)
Medal record
European Championship
Bronze medal – third place	2010 Denmark/Norway

Kamilla Birkedal Larsen (née Kristensen; born 2 September 1983) is a Danish former team handball player. She has played for Handball Club Odense and for the Danish women's national handball team. She retired when her contract with HC Odense expired, although she has said, that she wanted to continue. She attended Kalundborg Gymnasium.

After her playing career, she has continued in Handball as a sports agent.

At the 2010 European Women's Handball Championship she reached the bronze final and placed fourth with the Danish team.

She is married with the Greenlandic handball coach and former player Jakob Larsen.
