= Yara ten Holte =

Dutch handball player (born 1999)

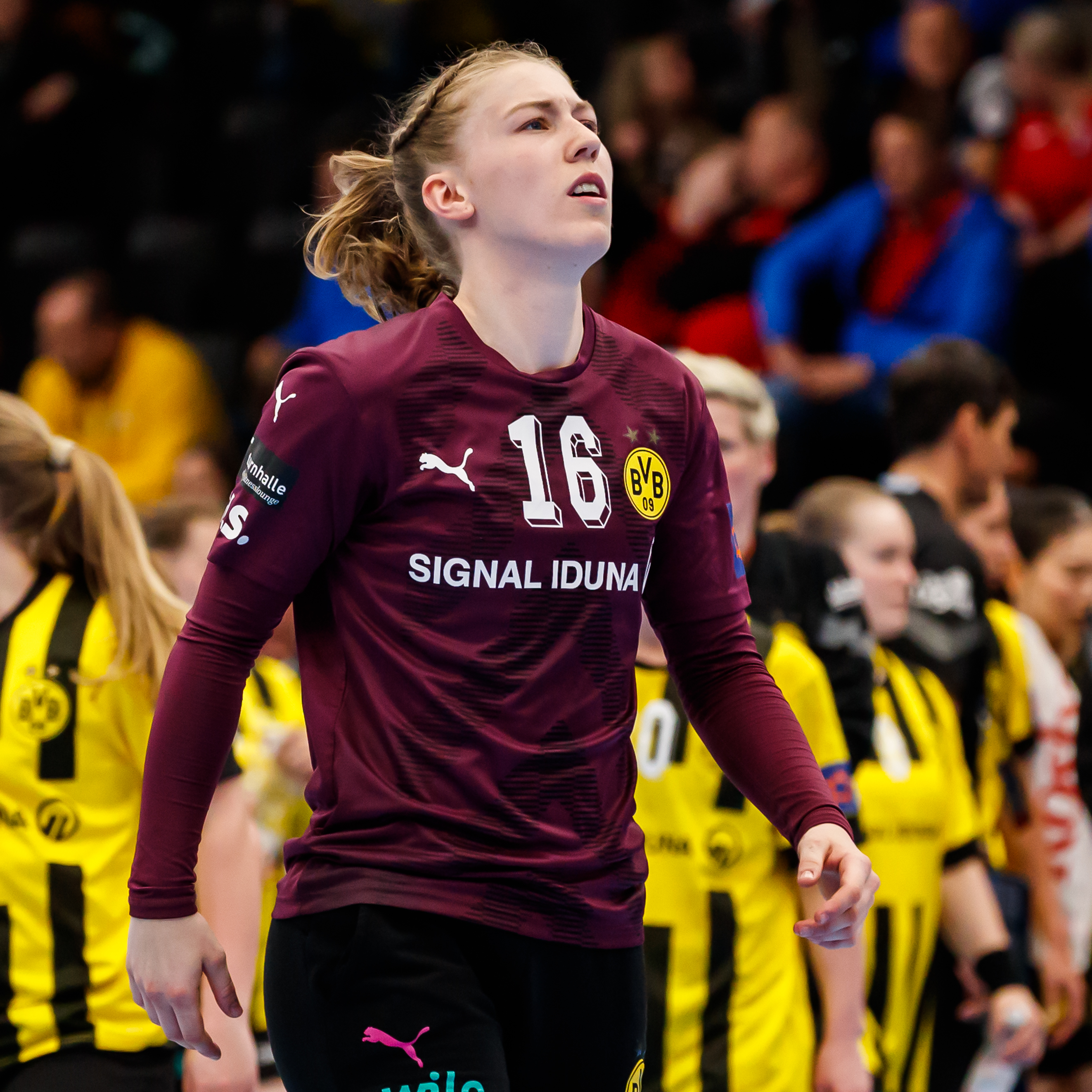

Personal information
- Full name: Yara ten Holte
- Nationality: Dutch
- Born: 23 November 1999 (age 26) Amsterdam, Netherlands
- Height: 1.75 m (5 ft 9 in)

Sport
- Sport: Handball
- Position: Goalkeeper
- Current club: Odense Håndbold
- Number: 16

Senior clubs
- Years: Team
- 2014–2018: SV Dalfsen Handbal
- 2018–2023: Borussia Dortmund Handball
- 2020–2021: → TuS Lintfort (loan)
- 2023–: Odense Håndbold
National team
| Years | Team | Apps | (Gls) |
| 2021– | Netherlands | 90 | (4) |
- Updated on 14 December 2025

Yara ten Holte (born 23 November 1999) is a Dutch handball player for the Danish club Odense Håndbold and the Dutch national team.

== Career ==
Yara ten Holte played from 2014 for SV Dalfsen. Here she won the Dutch championship twice, the Dutch cup three times, and the Dutch Super Cup twice. In the 2016–17 and 2017–18 season she was named as the goalkeeper of the year in the Dutch league.

She then joined German side Borussia Dortmund Handball. In the 2020-21 she played for both Dortmund and the 2nd Bundesliga team TuS Lintfort. In that season she won the German championship with Dortmund.

In December 2022, she signed a four-year contract with Odense Håndbold. In the 2024-25 season, she achieved a perfect regular season with Odense Håndbold, winning 26 of 26 games. Later the same year she reached the final of the EHF Champions League where Odense lost the final to Hungarian Győri ETO KC 30–27. 11 days later she won the Danish Championship, when Odense beat Team Esbjerg in the final 2–1 in matches.

== National team ==
ten Holte played for both the U17 and U20 Dutch national teams. On 1 October 2020 she made her debut for the Dutch national team in a friendly against Germany. She represented Netherlands at the 2021 World Women's Handball Championship in Spain.

At the 2023 World Championship she scored 3 goals and had a save percentage of 38%, when the Netherlands finished 5th.

== Gallery ==
Yara ten Holte stopping Elma Halilcevic's shot in 2023

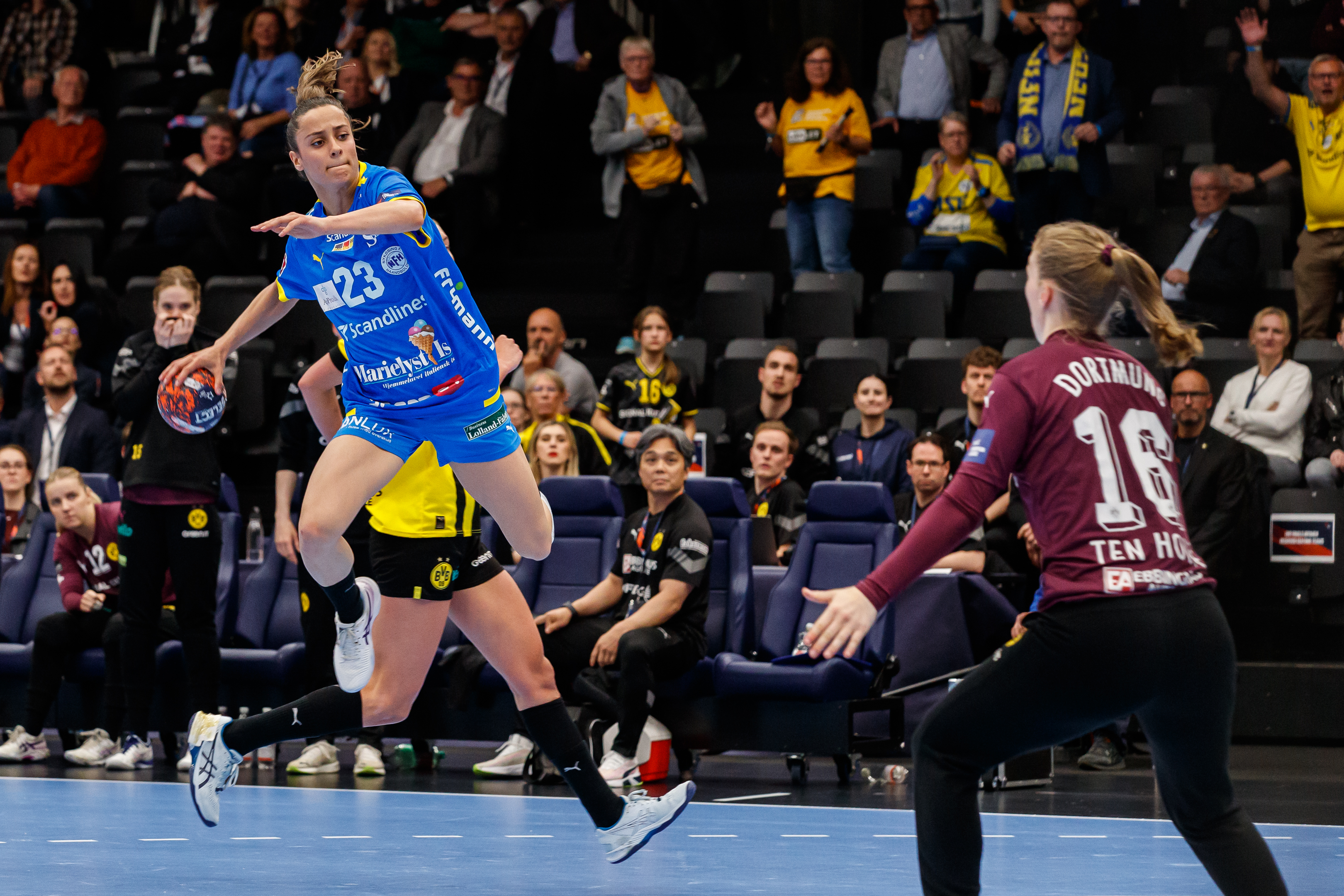

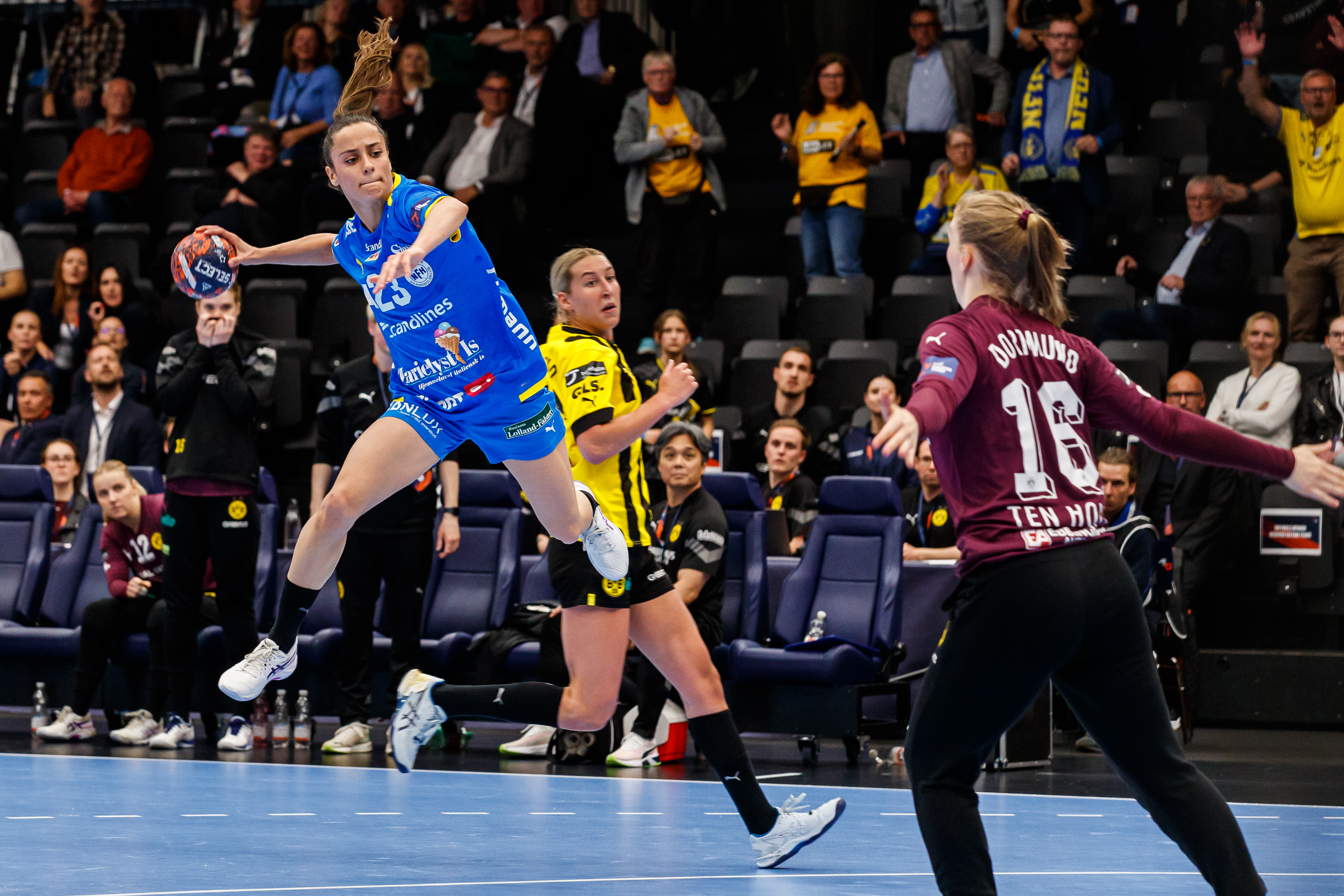

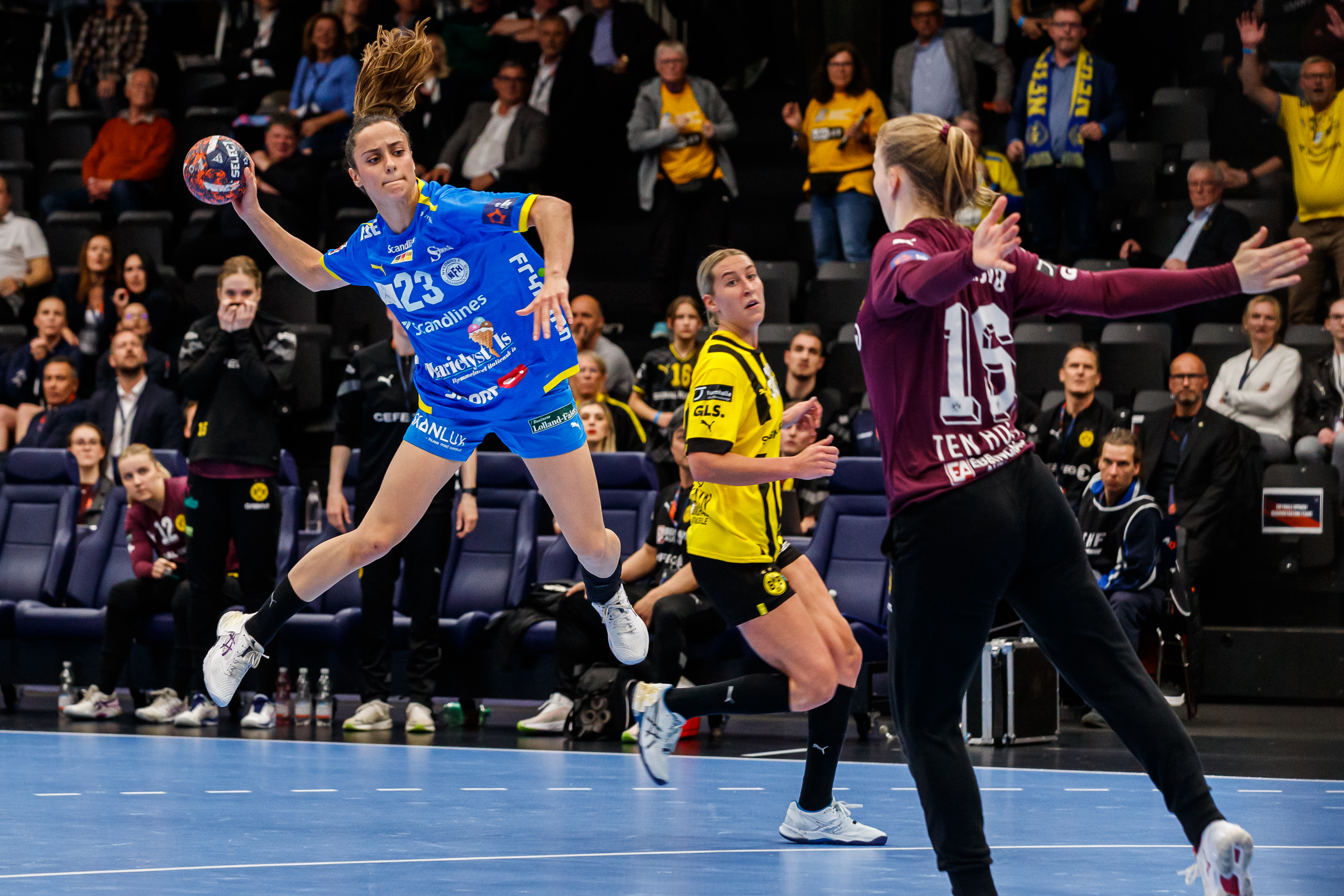

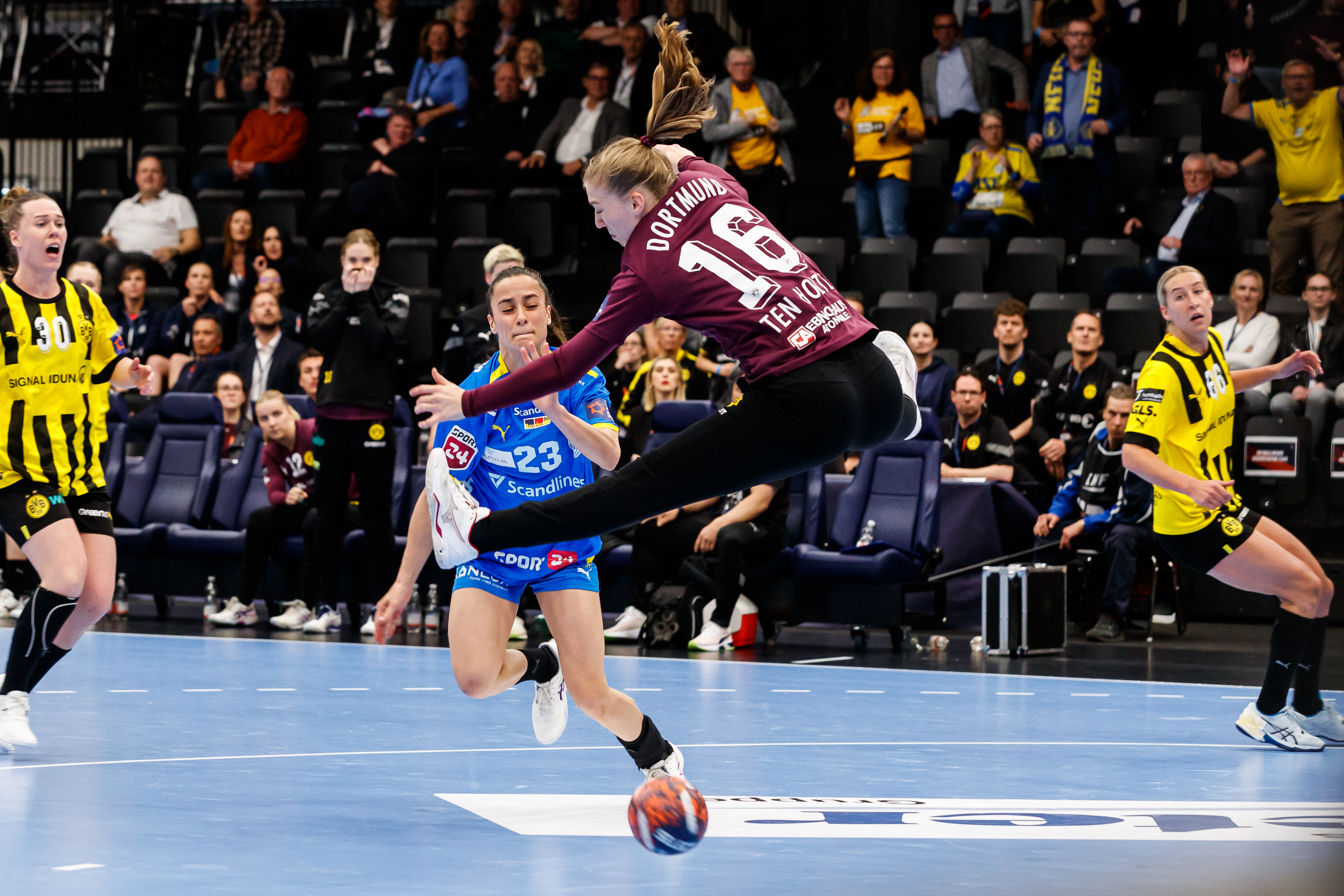

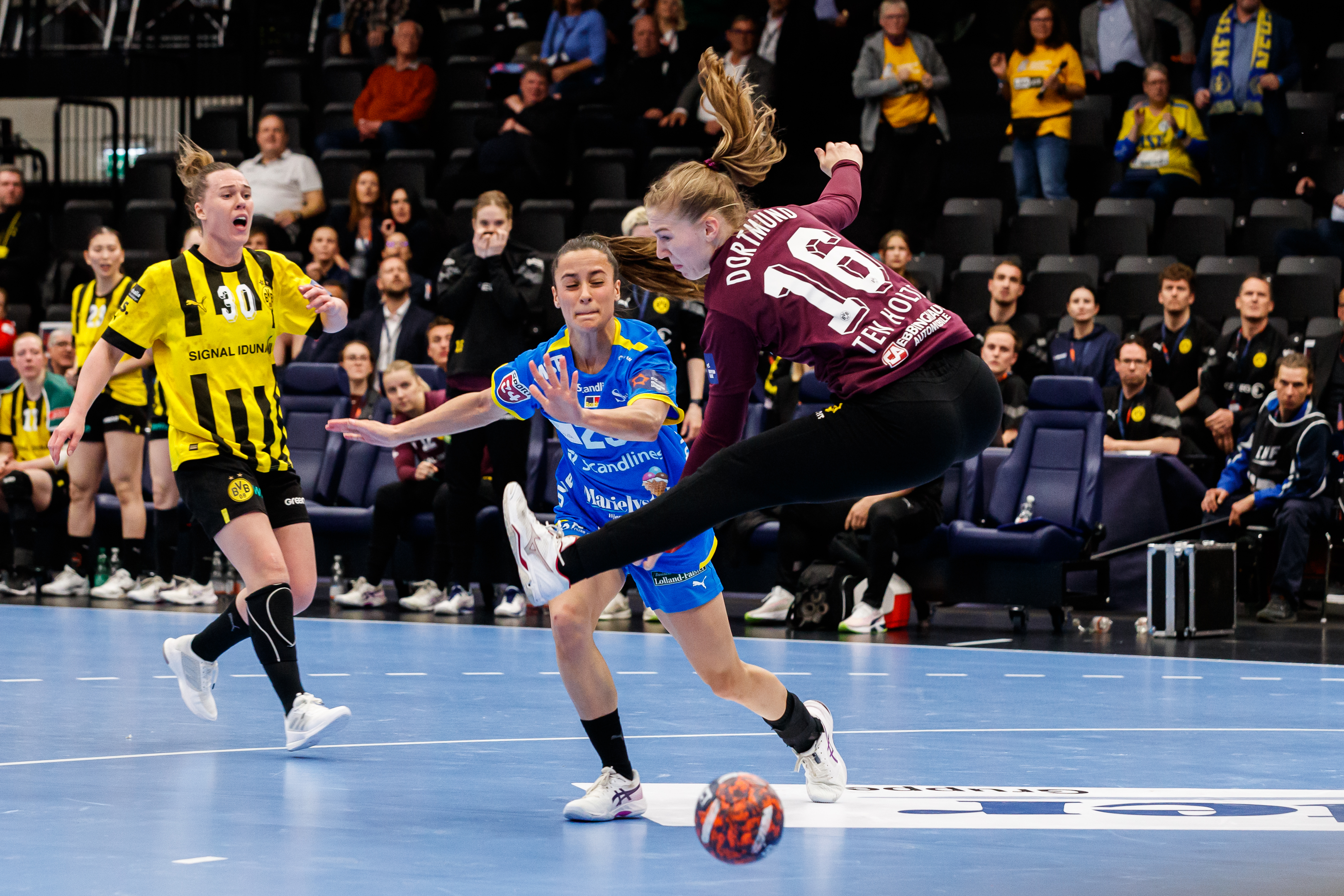
