= Gabriella Kain =

Swedish handball player (born 1981)

Personal information
- Full name: Gabriella Kain
- Nationality: Swedish
- Born: 25 March 1981 (age 45) Stockholm, Sweden
- Height: 1.80 m (5 ft 11 in)

Sport
- Sport: Handball
- Position: Goalkeeper

Senior clubs
- Years: Team
- 1999-2000: Käffa HF
- 2000-2006: IK Sävehof
- 2006-2008: Skövde HF
- 2008-2009: GOG Svendborg TGI
- 2009-2010: Odense Håndbold
- 2010-2012: KIF Vejen
- 2012-2013: RK Krim
National team
Years	Team	Apps	(Gls)
2008-2012	Sweden	82	(0)
Medal record
European Championship
Silver medal – second place	2010 Denmark/Norway	Team

Gabriella Kain (born 25 March 1981) is a former Swedish handball goalkeeper. She last played for the club RK Krim and on the Swedish national team. She competed at the 2010 European Women's Handball Championship where the Swedish team placed second.
