= Freja Cohrt =

Danish handball player (born 1994)

Personal information
- Full name: Freja Cohrt Kyndbøl
- Nationality: Danish
- Born: 20 January 1994 (age 32) Odense, Denmark
- Height: 1.68 m (5 ft 6 in)

Sport
- Sport: Handball
- Position: Left wing
- Current club: København Håndbold
- Number: 6

Youth career
- Years: Team
- 2003–2009: OH 77 Odense
- 2009–2010: HC Odense
- 2010–2011: Sportsefterskolen SINE
- 2011–2012: FC Midtjylland

Senior clubs
- Years: Team
- 2011–2012: FC Midtjylland
- 2012–2014: Randers HK
- 2014–2015: Skive fH
- 2015–2017: Silkeborg-Voel KFUM
- 2017–2023: Odense Håndbold
- 2023–: København Håndbold
National team
Years	Team	Apps	(Gls)
2014–	Denmark	28	(52)
Medal record
IHF Junior World Championship
Bronze medal – third place	2014 Croatia
IHF Youth World Championship
Gold medal – first place	2012 Montenegro
European Junior Championship
Bronze medal – third place	2013 Denmark
European Youth Championship
Silver medal – second place	2011 Czech Republic
- Updated on 22 January 2024

Freja Cohrt Kyndbøl (born 20 January 1994) is a Danish former handball player who played for the Danish national team. She retired in 2025.

== Career ==
=== Youth teams ===
Cohrt started playing handball at OH77 in the hometown, Odense. Through HC Odense and the elite sport boarding school SINE, she joined the youth team of FC Midtjylland.

=== Randers HK ===
In 2012 she signed her first professional contract at Randers HK, where she debuted for the senior team in September against Team Esbjerg.

=== Skive fH ===
In 2014-15 she played a single season for Skive fH. In April 2025 the team however decided to withdraw from the league due to financial difficulties.

=== Silkeborg-Voel ===
In 2015 she joined Silkeborg-Voel KFUM, and already in December the same year she signed a contract extension until 2018. She did however decide to resign already in 2017 for personal reasons.

=== Odense Håndbold ===
In 2017 she joined Odense Håndbold, and became one of the key players at the team. In 2020 she extended her contract until 2023.

She was part of the Odense Håndbold team that won the Danish league back-to-back in 2021 and 2022. This was the first time Odense won the Danish Championship.

=== København Håndbold ===
In 2023 she joined København Håndbold after her contract expired at Odense. After 2 years at København Håndbold she retired from handball.

== National team ==
Cohrt had played 24 matches for the Danish junior national team and 40 matches for the Danish youth national team, before debuting for the Danish senior national team in November 2014.

She represented Denmark at the 2019 World Women's Handball Championship in Japan, where Denmark finished 9th.

== Titles ==
- Danish league:
  - Winner: 2021, 2022
  - Second place: 2018, 2020
  - third place: 2019
- Danish Cup
  - Winner: 2020
  - Finalist: 2018, 2019
