= Odense Håndbold =

Danish handball club

- Full name: Odense Håndbold
- Short name: Odense
- Founded: August 2009
- Arena: Sydbank Arena
- Capacity: 2,300
- President: Lasse Honoré
- League: Bambusa Kvindeligaen
- 2025–26: 2nd
- Club colours
Home	Away

Location of Odense Håndbold

Odense Håndbold (in its first season: Odense GOG and after that Handball Club Odense) is a Danish professional women's handball team, that plays in Damehåndboldligaen, Denmark's premier women's handball league.

The team's home court is Sydbank Arena in the city of Odense and they play in orange shirts and black shorts.

== History ==
The precursor to Odense Håndbold, GOG Håndbold's women's team, won four Danish championships in the 1990s.

Odense Håndbold was created in August 2009 as a break-away club from GOG Svendborg TGI and they overtook GOG's license for the league, which was published in a press meeting August 27, 2009 in Odense Idrætshal. They therefore started their first season in the top flight of Danish handball. The season after they changed their club name to HC Odense to distance itself from GOG. As GOG was heading towards bankruptcy, they had to obtain special permission from the Danish Handball Federation to separate the women's team from GOG.

They changed their name to Odense Håndbold (Odense Handball) before the beginning of the 2016/17 season. In the 2020-21 season the club won their first Danish championship, beating Viborg HK in the final. In the 2024-25 season they managed to achieve a perfect regular season, winning 26 of 26 games. Later they won the Danish Championship, beating Team Esbjerg 2-1 in the final.

In the 2024–25 Women's EHF Champions League they qualified for the final four for the first time in club history, when they beat Hungarian Ferencvaros. When Team Esbjerg qualified the day after, it became the first time that there were two Danish teams in the Champions League final four. They lost the final to Hungarian Győri ETO KC 30-27.

In the 2025-26 Champions League they went out in the quarterfinal to Győri ETO KC with an aggregate defeat of 23 goals.

== Kits ==
HOME
2018–19	Craft; 2019–

AWAY

2015–16

== Achievements ==
- EHF Champions League:
  - Silver: 2025
- Danish League:
  - Winner: 2021, 2022, 2025
  - Runners-up: 2018, 2020, 2023, 2026
  - Third place: 2019, 2024
- Danish Cup
  - Winner: 2020, 2025
  - Runners-up: 2018, 2019, 2021, 2022, 2024
  - Third place: 2023
- Danish Super Cup
  - Winner: 2023, 2025

== Stadium ==
- Name: Sydbank Arena
- City: Odense
- Capacity: 2,300 seats
- Address: Odense Idrætshal, Israels Plads 3, 5200 Odense

== Team ==
=== Current squad ===
Squad for the 2026–27 season

Goalkeepers

- 1 (Sweden) Johanna Bundsen
- 16 (Denmark) Althea Reinhardt
- 38 (Netherlands) Yara ten Holte

Wingers
LW

- 10 (Denmark) Anna Grundtvig (pregnant)
- 17 (Denmark) Matilde Vestergaard
- 23 (Denmark) Elma Halilcevic

RW

- 11 (Norway) Tina Abdulla
- 34 (Denmark) Andrea Aagot (pregnant)

Line players

- 3 (Norway) Maren Aardahl (pregnant)
- 24 (Netherlands) Romée Maarschalkerweerd
- 44 (Netherlands) Nikita van der Vliet

Back players
LB

- 21 (Norway) Ingvild Bakkerud
- 22 (Germany) Xenia Smits
- 32 (Denmark) Mie Højlund (c)

CB

- 8 (Norway) Helene Fauske
- 28 (Denmark) Emile Clemmensen
- 51 (Czech Republic) Markéta Jeřábková

RB

- 7 (Germany) Viola Leuchter
- 13 (Russia) Anna Vyakhireva
- 27 (Denmark) Louise Burgaard

Squad information
No.	Nat.	Player	Position	Date of birth	In	Contract until
3	(Norway)	Maren Aardahl	Pivot	2 March 1994	2021	2029
8	(Norway)	Helene Fauske	Centre Back	31 January 1997	2024	2027
10	(Denmark)	Anna Grundtvig	Left Wing	29 September 1995	2024	2027
12	(Denmark)	Andrea Nørklit	Goalkeeper	25 August 2006	2024	2030
16	(Denmark)	Althea Reinhardt	Goalkeeper	1 September 1996	2016	2028
20	(Spain)	Lysa Tchaptchet	Line Player	20 December 2001	2024	2027
22	(Norway)	Ragnhild Valle Dahl	Left Back	2 January 1998	2023	2026
23	(Denmark)	Elma Halilcevic	Left Wing	18 June 2000	2023	2028
27	(Denmark)	Louise Burgaard	Right Back	17 October 1992	2024	2027
28	(Denmark)	Clara Skyum Thomsen	Right Back	27 August 2001	2024	2027
32	(Denmark)	Mie Højlund	Left Back	24 October 1997	2017	2028
33	(Norway)	Thale Rushfeldt Deila	Centre Back	15 January 2000	2023	2027
34	(Denmark)	Andrea Aagot	Right Wing	22 May 2000	2023	2028
38	(Netherlands)	Yara ten Holte	Goalkeeper	23 November 1999	2023	2027
44	(Netherlands)	Nikita van der Vliet	Line Player	14 March 2000	2023	2027

=== Transfers ===
Transfers for the 2027-28 season

Joining

- (Norway) Steffen Stegavik (Head coach) (from (Norway) Sola HK) (As of January 2027)
- (Germany) Nieke Kühne (LB) (from (Germany) HSG Blomberg-Lippe)
- (Norway) Mia Svele (CB) (from (Denmark) Nykøbing Falster Håndboldklub)
- (Denmark) Helena Elver (CB) (from (Hungary) Győri ETO KC)

Leaving

- (Norway) Helene Fauske (CB) (retires)
- (Netherlands) Yara ten Holte (GK) (to (France) Brest Bretagne Handball)?

=== Technical staff ===
- (Denmark) Head coach:
- (Denmark) Assistant coach: Mark Strandgaard Marcher
- (Norway) Goalkeeping coach: Ole Erevik
- (Denmark) Goalkeeping coach: Gitte Sunesen
- (Denmark) Team Leader: Trine Trampedach
- (Denmark) Team Leader: Lilian Maag
- (Denmark) Physiotherapist: Anja David Greve
- (Denmark) Physiotherapist: Berit Duus
- (Denmark) Physiotherapist: Maj Tornøe Johansen

=== Previous squads ===
2020–2021 Team
Shirt No	Nationality	Player	Birth Date	Position
4	Norway	Malene Aambakk	13 May 1993 (aged 27)	Right back
6	Denmark	Freja Cohrt	20 January 1994 (aged 26)	Left wing
8	Netherlands	Lois Abbingh	13 August 1992 (aged 27)	Left back
9	Denmark	Katja Johansen	30 April 2000 (aged 20)	Left wing
10	Brazil	Jessica Quintino	17 April 1991 (aged 29)	Right wing
11	Denmark	Rikke Iversen	18 May 1993 (aged 27)	Pivot
16	Denmark	Althea Reinhardt	1 September 1996 (aged 23)	Goalkeeper
17	Netherlands	Nycke Groot	4 May 1988 (aged 32)	Playmaker
18	Denmark	Kamilla Kristensen	2 September 1983 (aged 36)	Pivot
19	Denmark	Sara Hald	4 June 1996 (aged 24)	Pivot
20	Denmark	Anne Cecilie de la Cour	8 December 1993 (aged 26)	Right back
21	Japan	Ayaka Ikehara	24 September 1990 (aged 29)	Right wing
30	Denmark	Iben Hesseldal Hansen	23 January 2000 (aged 20)	Goalkeeper
32	Denmark	Mie Højlund	24 October 1997 (aged 22)	Playmaker
33	Netherlands	Tess Wester	19 May 1993 (aged 27)	Goalkeeper
39	Sweden	Angelica Wallén	11 April 1986 (aged 34)	Left back
68	Denmark	Helena Elver	1 March 1998 (aged 22)	Left back
90	Denmark	Mia Rej	2 February 1990 (aged 30)	Playmaker

2018–2019 Team
Shirt No	Nationality	Player	Birth Date	Position
3	Denmark	Suzanne Bækhøj	23 March 1996 (aged 22)	Left wing
6	Denmark	Freja Cohrt	20 January 1994 (aged 24)	Left wing
7	Denmark	Susanne Madsen	13 July 1991 (aged 26)	Left back
8	Norway	Ingvild Bakkerud	9 July 1995 (aged 22)	Left back
9	Norway	Maja Jakobsen	28 March 1990 (aged 28)	Right back
10	Brazil	Jessica Quintino	17 April 1991 (aged 27)	Right wing
13	Denmark	Mathilde Schæfer	13 July 1997 (aged 20)	Left back
14	Denmark	Mette Tranborg	1 January 1996 (aged 22)	Right back
16	Denmark	Althea Reinhardt	1 September 1996 (aged 21)	Goalkeeper
18	Denmark	Kamilla Kristensen	2 September 1983 (aged 34)	Pivot
25	Denmark	Trine Østergaard	17 October 1991 (aged 26)	Right wing
27	Denmark	Nadia Offendal	22 October 1994 (aged 23)	Playmaker
28	Denmark	Stine Jørgensen	3 September 1990 (aged 27)	Left back
33	Netherlands	Tess Wester	19 May 1993 (aged 25)	Goalkeeper
36	Denmark	Kathrine Heindahl	26 April 1992 (aged 26)	Pivot

2017–2018 Team
Shirt No	Nationality	Player	Birth Date	Position
1	Norway	Emily Stang Sando	8 March 1989 (aged 28)	Goalkeeper
3	Denmark	Suzanne Bækhøj	23 March 1996 (aged 21)	Left wing
6	Denmark	Freja Cohrt	20 January 1994 (aged 23)	Left wing
7	Denmark	Susanne Madsen	13 July 1991 (aged 25)	Left back
8	Denmark	Stine Svangård	4 July 1984 (aged 32)	Playmaker
9	Norway	Maja Jakobsen	28 March 1990 (aged 27)	Right back
10	Brazil	Jessica Quintino	17 April 1991 (aged 26)	Right wing
13	Denmark	Mathilde Schæfer	13 July 1997 (aged 19)	Left back
14	Denmark	Mette Tranborg	1 January 1996 (aged 21)	Roght back
16	Denmark	Althea Reinhardt	1 September 1996 (aged 20)	Goalkeeper
17	Denmark	Susan Thorsgaard	13 October 1988 (aged 28)	Pivot
18	Denmark	Kamilla Kristensen	2 September 1983 (aged 33)	Pivot
19	Netherlands	Pearl van der Wissel	14 April 1984 (aged 33)	Playmaker
25	Denmark	Trine Østergaard	17 October 1991 (aged 25)	Right wing
27	Denmark	Nadia Offendal	22 October 1994 (aged 22)	Playmaker
28	Denmark	Stine Jørgensen	3 September 1990 (aged 26)	Left back
36	Denmark	Kathrine Heindahl	26 April 1992 (aged 25)	Pivot

2016–2017 Team
Shirt No	Nationality	Player	Birth Date	Position
1	Brazil	Chana Masson	18 December 1978 (aged 37)	Goalkeeper
2	Denmark	Matilde Kondrup Nielsen	9 February 1995 (aged 21)	Left wing
3	Denmark	Suzanne Bækhøj	23 March 1996 (aged 20)	Left wing
6	Denmark	Mathilde Schæfer	13 July 1997 (aged 18)	Left back
7	Denmark	Susanne Madsen	13 July 1991 (aged 24)	Left back
8	Denmark	Stine Svangård	4 July 1984 (aged 31)	Playmaker
9	Norway	Maja Jakobsen	28 March 1990 (aged 26)	Right back
10	Brazil	Jessica Quintino	17 April 1991 (aged 25)	Right wing
11	Denmark	Pernille Johannsen	26 September 1996 (aged 19)	Right wing
13	Sweden	Maria Adler	28 May 1992 (aged 24)	Left back
16	Denmark	Althea Reinhardt	1 September 1996 (aged 19)	Goalkeeper
17	Denmark	Susan Thorsgaard	13 October 1988 (aged 27)	Pivot
18	Denmark	Kamilla Kristensen	2 September 1983 (aged 32)	Pivot
19	Netherlands	Pearl van der Wissel	14 April 1984 (aged 32)	Playmaker
22	Russia	Oxana Kiseleva	12 July 1988 (aged 27)	Left wing
24	Denmark	Marianne Bonde	25 June 1984 (aged 32)	Pivot
27	Denmark	Nadia Offendal	22 October 1994 (aged 21)	Playmaker
81	Brazil	Deonise Fachinello	20 June 1983 (aged 33)	Right back

=== Notable former players ===
- (Denmark) Kamilla Larsen (2009–2022)
- (Denmark) Freja Cohrt (2017–2023)
- (Denmark) Stine Jørgensen (2017–2020)
- (Denmark) Line Jørgensen (2009–2010)
- (Denmark) Nadia Offendal (2013–2020)
- (Denmark) Trine Østergaard (2017–2020)
- (Denmark) Kathrine Heindahl (2017–2020)
- (Denmark) Rikke Iversen (2020–2023)
- (Denmark) Helena Elver (2020–2025)
- (Denmark) Pernille Holmsgaard (2009–2011)
- (Denmark) Cecilie Greve (2010–2015)
- (Denmark) Trine Jensen (2011–2013)
- (Denmark) Mette Tranborg (2017–2020)
- (Denmark) Anne Mette Pedersen (2019–2020)
- (Denmark) Sarah Iversen (2012–2016)
- (Denmark) Ditte Vind (2013–2016)
- (Denmark) Line Haugsted (2015–2016)
- (Denmark) Susan Thorsgaard (2016–2019)
- (Denmark) Susanne Madsen (2011–2013) (2016–2020)
- (Denmark) Sara Hald (2018–2021)
- (Denmark) Trine Pedersen (2021–2023)
- (Denmark) Anne Cecilie de la Cour (2020–2021)
- (Denmark) Marianne Bonde (2017)
- (Netherlands) Nycke Groot (2019–2021, 2022)
- (Netherlands) Tess Wester (2018–2021)
- (Netherlands) Lois Abbingh (2020–2023)
- (Netherlands) Jasmina Janković (2008–2009)
- (Netherlands) Pearl van der Wissel (2012–2018)
- (Netherlands) Dione Housheer (2021–2024)
- (Netherlands) Bo van Wetering (2021–2024)
- (Netherlands) Larissa Nüsser (2021–2024)
- (Netherlands) Kelly Vollebregt (2021–2023)
- (Norway) Ingrid Ødegård (2012–2013)
- (Norway) Siri Seglem (2013–2015)
- (Norway) Maja Jakobsen (2015–2019)
- (Norway) Malin Aune (2023–2025)
- (Norway) Emily Stang Sando (2017–2018)
- (Norway) Ingvild Bakkerud (2018–2020)
- (Norway) Malene Aambakk (2020–2022)
- (Norway) Tonje Løseth (2022–2024)
- (Norway) Katrine Lunde (2025)
- (Sweden) Jessica Helleberg (2013–2015)
- (Sweden) Maria Adler (2013–2017)
- (Sweden) Tina Flognman (2009–2010)
- (Sweden) Gabriella Kain (2008–2010)
- (Sweden) Nathalie Hagman (2019–2020)
- (Sweden) Angelica Wallén (2020–2021)
- (Sweden) Martina Thörn (2021–2023)
- (Brazil) Jéssica Quintino (2016–2021)
- (Brazil) Chana Masson (2015–2017)
- (Brazil) Deonise Fachinello (2016–2017)
- (Japan) Ayaka Ikehara (2020–2023)
- (Russia) Oksana Kiseleva (2016–2017)
- (Spain) Elisabeth Pinedo (2010–2011)

== Statistics ==
=== Top scorers in the EHF Champions League ===
Last updated on 8 November 2026

Rank	Name	Seasons played	Goals
1	(Denmark) Mie Højlund	8	383
2	(Norway) Maren Aardahl	6	284
3	(Norway) Thale Rushfeldt Deila	3	214
4	(Netherlands) Dione Housheer	3	206
4	(Denmark) Elma Halilcevic	4	206
6	(Denmark) Andrea Aagot	4	165
7	(Netherlands) Lois Abbingh	3	148
8	(Denmark) Freja Cohrt	4	142
9	(Netherlands) Bo van Wetering	3	130
9	(Denmark) Helena Elver	4	130

== European record ==
=== Champions League ===
Season	Competition	Round	Club	1st leg	2nd leg	Aggregate
2018–19	Champions League	Group Matches (Group A)	(France) Metz Handball	19–19	26–41	3rd place
2018–19	Champions League	Group Matches (Group A)	(Montenegro) ŽRK Budućnost	22–26	28–31	3rd place
2018–19	Champions League	Group Matches (Group A)	(Norway) Larvik HK	27–23	33–25	3rd place
2018–19	Champions League	Main Round (Group 1)	(Russia) Rostov-Don	26–30	19–25	4th place
2018–19	Champions League	Main Round (Group 1)	(Denmark) København Håndbold	25–23	24–24	4th place
2018–19	Champions League	Main Round (Group 1)	(France) Brest Bretagne Handball	28–24	29–24	4th place
2018–19	Champions League	Quarter-finals	(Hungary) Győri Audi ETO KC	28–29	21–33	49–62
2020–21	Champions League	Group stage (Group B)	(Romania) SCM Râmnicu Vâlcea	30–21	25–26	4th place
2020–21	Champions League	Group stage (Group B)	(Hungary) Győri Audi ETO KC	25–32	32–32	4th place
2020–21	Champions League	Group stage (Group B)	(Montenegro) ŽRK Budućnost	30–21	24–27	4th place
2020–21	Champions League	Group stage (Group B)	(Germany) Borussia Dortmund	32–27	24–32	4th place
2020–21	Champions League	Group stage (Group B)	(Russia) CSKA Moscow	23–27	26–25	4th place
2020–21	Champions League	Group stage (Group B)	(France) Brest Bretagne Handball	24–31	21–32	4th place
2020–21	Champions League	Group stage (Group B)	(Croatia) RK Podravka Koprivnica	33–17	35–20	4th place
2020–21	Champions League	Round of 16	(Norway) Vipers Kristiansand	26–30	36–35	62–65
2021–22	Champions League	Group stage (Group B)	(Russia) CSKA Moscow	27–27	28–21	5th place
2021–22	Champions League	Group stage (Group B)	(Norway) Vipers Kristiansand	27–32	27–31	5th place
2021–22	Champions League	Group stage (Group B)	(Slovenia) RK Krim Mercator	26–24	24–19	5th place
2021–22	Champions League	Group stage (Group B)	(Hungary) Győri Audi ETO KC	26–31	26–27	5th place
2021–22	Champions League	Group stage (Group B)	(France) Metz Handball	21–27	31–38	5th place
2021–22	Champions League	Group stage (Group B)	(Turkey) Kastamonu Bld. GSK	37–29	25–31	5th place
2021–22	Champions League	Group stage (Group B)	(Sweden) IK Sävehof	37–24	37–31	5th place
2021–22	Champions League	Playoffs	(France) Brest Bretagne Handball	25–24	26–29	51–53
2022–23	EHF Champions League	Group A	(Norway) Vipers Kristiansand	27–34	24–34	3rd place
2022–23	EHF Champions League	Group A	(Slovenia) RK Krim Mercator	29–23	26–22	3rd place
2022–23	EHF Champions League	Group A	(Germany) SG BBM Bietigheim	31–24	27–24	3rd place
2022–23	EHF Champions League	Group A	(France) Brest Bretagne Handball	25–21	25–24	3rd place
2022–23	EHF Champions League	Group A	(Hungary) FTC-Rail Cargo Hungaria	23–27	25–28	3rd place
2022–23	EHF Champions League	Group A	(Czech Republic) DHK Baník Most	41–22	37–19	3rd place
2022–23	EHF Champions League	Group A	(Romania) CSM București	27–31	31–40	3rd place
2022–23	EHF Champions League	Playoffs	(Norway) Storhamar HE	30–22	30–30	60–52
2022–23	EHF Champions League	QF	(Hungary) Győri Audi ETO KC	27–29	28–37	55–66
2023–24	EHF Champions League	Group A	(Romania) CSM București	24–28	29–25	2nd place
2023–24	EHF Champions League	Group A	(Hungary) Győri ETO KC	29–32	30–31	2nd place
2023–24	EHF Champions League	Group A	(Sweden) IK Sävehof	44–20	40–22	2nd place
2023–24	EHF Champions League	Group A	(France) Brest Bretagne Handball	26–25	29–29	2nd place
2023–24	EHF Champions League	Group A	(Germany) SG BBM Bietigheim	42–29	28–25	2nd place
2023–24	EHF Champions League	Group A	(Montenegro) ŽRK Budućnost Podgorica	39–24	33–17	2nd place
2023–24	EHF Champions League	Group A	(Hungary) DVSC Schaeffler	33–30	35–22	2nd place
2023–24	EHF Champions League	QF	(Germany) SG BBM Bietigheim	26–30	32–30	58–60
2024–25	EHF Champions League	Group B	(Denmark) Team Esbjerg	30–39	23–32	3rd place
2024–25	EHF Champions League	Group B	(Montenegro) ŽRK Budućnost Podgorica	31–29	33–24	3rd place
2024–25	EHF Champions League	Group B	(Germany) HB Ludwigsburg	28–22	40–24	3rd place
2024–25	EHF Champions League	Group B	(Norway) Vipers Kristiansand	24–26	10–0	3rd place
2024–25	EHF Champions League	Group B	(France) Brest Bretagne Handball	36–33	38–36	3rd place
2024–25	EHF Champions League	Group B	(Romania) CS Rapid București	32–24	42–25	3rd place
2024–25	EHF Champions League	Group B	(Hungary) Győri ETO KC	35–28	32–34	3rd place
2024–25	EHF Champions League	Playoffs	(Norway) Storhamar HE	33–20	25–21	58–41
2024–25	EHF Champions League	QF	(Hungary) FTC-Rail Cargo Hungaria	27–27	25–24	52–51
2024–25	EHF Champions League	SF	(France) Metz Handball	31–29 (ET)		
2024–25	EHF Champions League	F	(Hungary) Győri Audi ETO KC	27–29		
2025–26	EHF Champions League	Group B	(Romania) CSM București	36–30	24–33	4th place
2025–26	EHF Champions League	Group B	(Norway) Sola HK	32–27	40–25	4th place
2025–26	EHF Champions League	Group B	(France) Brest Bretagne Handball	31–40	33–40	4th place
2025–26	EHF Champions League	Group B	(Hungary) Ferencvárosi TC	34–32	28–30	4th place
2025–26	EHF Champions League	Group B	(Slovenia) RK Krim Mercator	38–30	30–21	4th place
2025–26	EHF Champions League	Group B	(Croatia) RK Podravka Koprivnica	31–31	42–24	4th place
2025–26	EHF Champions League	Group B	(Denmark) Ikast Håndbold	35–28	33–30	4th place
2025–26	EHF Champions League	Playoffs	(Hungary) DVSC Schaeffler	37–32	34–34	71–66
2025–26	EHF Champions League	QF	(Hungary) Győri ETO KC	28–36	25–40	53–76
2026–27	EHF Champions League	Group stage Group B	(Denmark) Nykøbing Falster	27–27		
2026–27	EHF Champions League	Group stage Group B	(Croatia) HC Podravka Vegeta	31–24		
2026–27	EHF Champions League	Group stage Group B	(Romania) CS Gloria Bistrița	27–29		
2026–27	EHF Champions League	Group stage Group B	(Norway) Storhamar HE	23–26		
2026–27	EHF Champions League	Group stage Group B	(Germany) HSG Blomberg-Lippe	35–18		
2026–27	EHF Champions League	Group stage Group B	(Hungary) Győri ETO KC	31–32		
2026–27	EHF Champions League	Group stage Group B	(France) Metz Handball	31–33		

=== EHF Cup ===
Season	Competition	Round	Club	1st leg	2nd leg	Aggregate
2019–20	EHF Cup	Round 2	(Czech Republic) DHC Slavia Prague	34–25	38–14	72–39
2019–20	EHF Cup	Round 3	(France) ESBF Besançon	25–23	32–29	57–52
2019–20	EHF Cup	Group stage (Group C)	(Poland) MKS Perła Lublin	35–18	33–20	1st place
2019–20	EHF Cup	Group stage (Group C)	(Hungary) Érd HC	31–24	28–27	1st place
2019–20	EHF Cup	Group stage (Group C)	(Romania) CS Gloria 2018 Bistrița-Năsăud	25–19	23–25	1st place
2019–20	EHF Cup	Quarterfinals	(Russia) HC Lada	34–30	28–31	62–61
2019–20	EHF Cup	Semifinals	(Hungary) Siófok KC	Cancelled		

=== Cup Winners' Cup ===
Season	Competition	Round	Club	1st leg	2nd leg	Aggregate
2013–14	Cup Winners' Cup	Round 2	(North Macedonia) WHC Metalurg	30–17	30–24	60–41
2013–14	Cup Winners' Cup	Round 3	(France) Cercle Dijon Bourgogne	24–22	25–19	49–41
2013–14	Cup Winners' Cup	Last 16	(Austria) Hypo Niederösterreich	23–27	27–28	50–55
2014–15	Cup Winners' Cup	Round 3	(Denmark) Randers HK	28–28	26–30	54–58

== Kit manufacturers ==
- (Germany) Puma (−2017)
- (Germany) Adidas (2017–2019)
- (Sweden) Craft Sportswear (2019–)
