= Anne Cecilie de la Cour =

Danish handball player (born 1993)

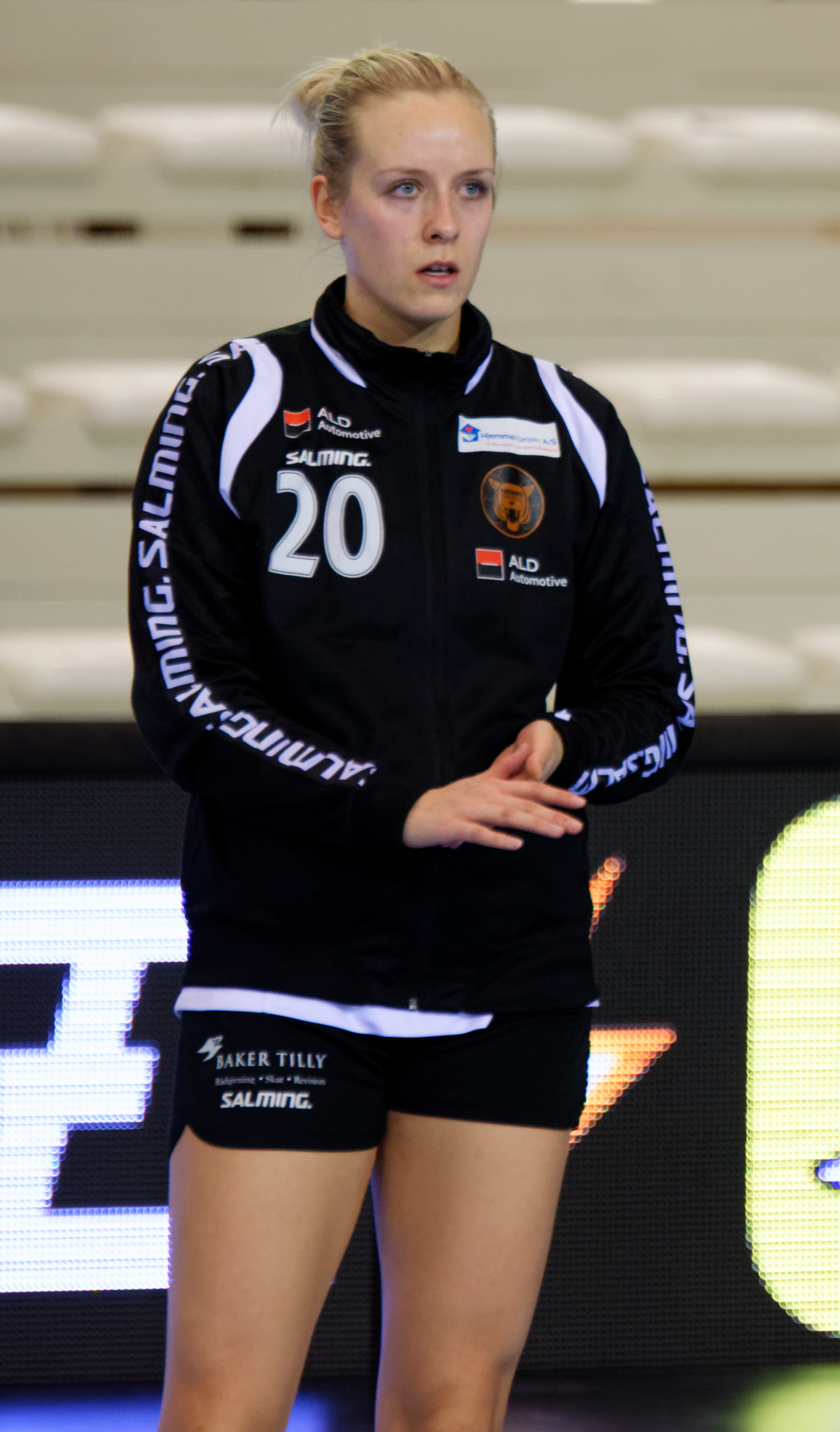
- De la Cour in 2018

Personal information
- Full name: Anne Cecilie Dornonville de la Cour
- Nationality: Danish
- Born: 8 December 1993 (age 32) Aarhus, Denmark
- Height: 1.78 m (5 ft 10 in)

Sport
- Sport: Handball
- Position: Right back
- Current club: Odense Håndbold
- Number: 20

Youth career
- Years: Team
- 2009-2011: Viborg HK

Senior clubs
- Years: Team
- 2011-2012: Viborg HK
- 2012-2015: Silkeborg-Voel KFUM
- 2015-2020: København Håndbold
- 2020-2021: Odense Håndbold
National team
Years	Team	Apps	(Gls)
2014-2021	Denmark	33	(42)

Anne Cecilie Dornonville de la Cour (born 8 December 1993) is a Danish former handball player, who played for Odense Håndbold and the Danish national team. She retired in 2021.

She debuted for the Danish National Team on 11 October 2014 against Brazil at the Golden League tournament. Her first major international tournament was the 2016 European Championship. She also participated in the 2018 European Championship.

She won the Danish top league, Damehåndboldligaen in 2020-21 with Odense Håndbold; the first time ever the club won the Danish championship.

== Individual awards ==
- Danish League Best Right Back: 2015

== Private life ==
She is in a relationship with Danish handballer Mads Knutzon, and the couple has two kids together.
