= Anna Grundtvig =

Danish handball player (born 1998)

Personal information
- Full name: Anna Blyme Grundtvig
- Born: 27 September 1995 (age 31) Gentofte, Denmark
- Height: 1.69 m (5 ft 7 in)

Sport
- Sport: Handball
- Position: Left wing
- Current club: Odense Håndbold
- Number: 10

Senior clubs
- Years: Team
- 2012–2014: Frederiksberg IF
- 2013–2014: København Håndbold
- 2014–2017: Roskilde Håndbold
- 2017–2024: Ajax København
- 2024–: Odense Håndbold
National team
Years	Team	Apps	(Gls)
2025–	Denmark	2	(8)
- Updated on 8 March 2025

Anna Blyme Grundtvig (born 27 September 1995) is a Danish handball player, who plays for Odense Håndbold and the Danish national team.

== Career ==
She started her career at Frederiksberg IF. Later she joined København Håndbold and Roskilde Håndbold. In 2017 she signed for Ajax København. Here she was the club top scorer for several seasons. In 2024 she signed for Odense Håndbold. Before she was approached by Odense Håndbold, she considered retiring from handball. 11 days later she won the Danish Championship, when Odense beat Team Esbjerg in the final 2–1 in matches.

In the 2024-25 season, she achieved a perfect regular season with Odense Håndbold, winning 26 of 26 games. Later the same year she reached the final of the EHF Champions League where Odense lost the final to Hungarian Győri ETO KC 30–27.

=== National team ===
At the age of 29 she made her debut for the Danish national team, in a win against Norway in Golden League on 6 March 2025. She played a good match and scored 6 goals.
