= Oxana Kiseleva =

Russian handball player

Personal information
- Nationality: Russian
- Born: 12 July 1988 (age 38) Krasnodar, Russia
- Height: 1.62 m (5 ft 4 in)

Sport
- Sport: Handball
- Position: Left wing
- Current club: Rostov-Don
- Number: 22

Senior clubs
- Years: Team
- 2004-2012: Kuban Krasnodar
- 2012-2016: Rostov-Don
- 2016-2017: HC Odense
- 2017-: Rostov-Don

Oxana Kiseleva (born 12 July 1988) is a Russian handball player for Rostov-Don.
