= Susan Thorsgaard =

Danish handball player (born 1988)

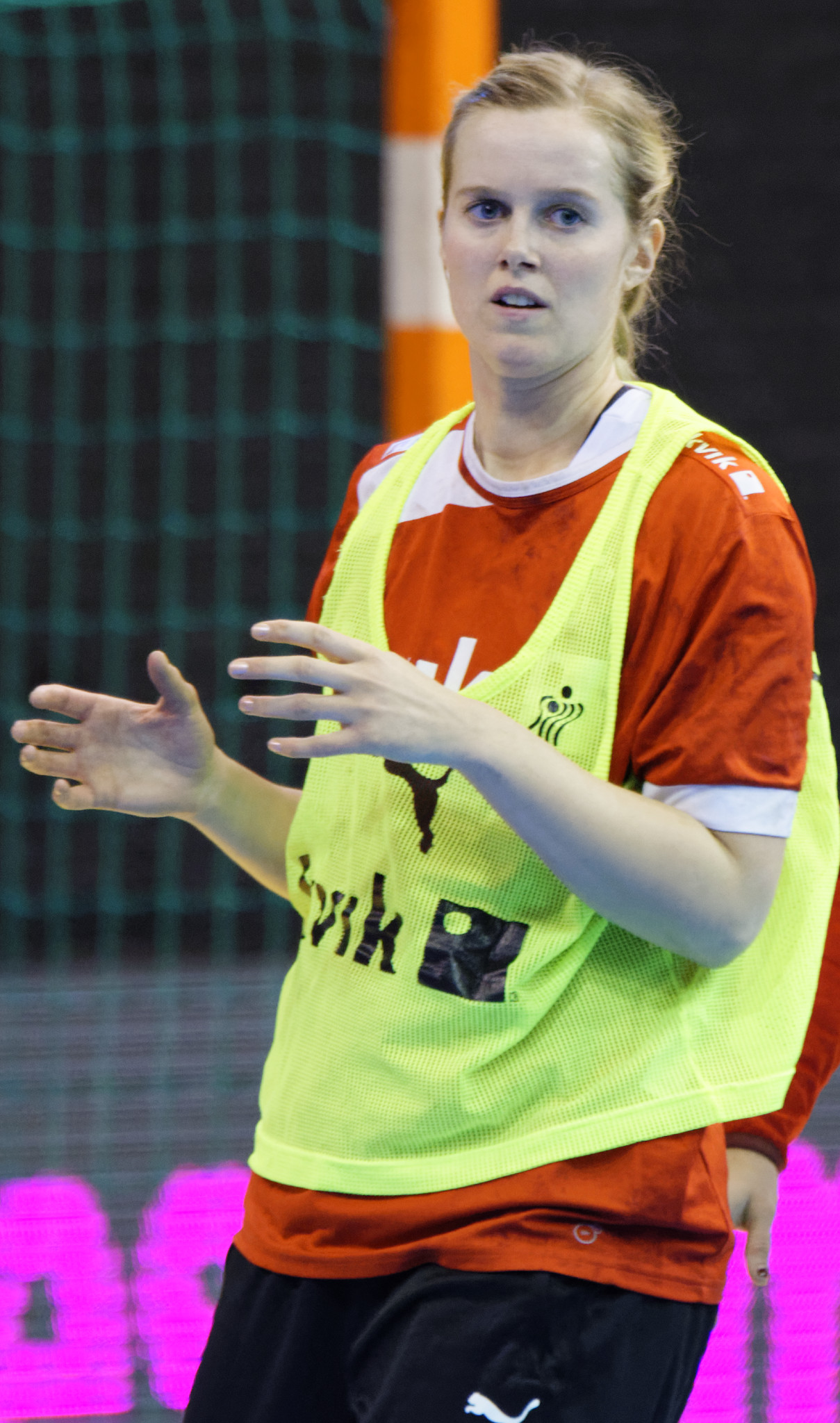
- Susan Thorsgaard playing for FCM Håndbold, September 2011

Personal information
- Nationality: Danish
- Born: 13 October 1988 (age 38) Aarhus, Denmark
- Height: 1.89 m (6 ft 2 in)

Sport
- Sport: Handball
- Position: Pivot
- Number: 17

Senior clubs
- Years: Team
- -2006: Brabrand IF
- 2006–2008: Silkeborg-Voel KFUM
- 2008–2016: FC Midtjylland Håndbold
- 2016–2018: Odense Håndbold
National team
Years	Team	Apps	(Gls)
2007–2015	Denmark	131	(226)
Medal record
World Championship
Bronze medal – third place	2013 Serbia	Team
IHF Junior World Championship
Silver medal – second place	2008 Macedonia
IHF Youth World Championship
Gold medal – first place	2006 Canada
European Junior Championship
Gold medal – first place	2007 Turkey
European Youth Championship
Gold medal – first place	2005 Austria

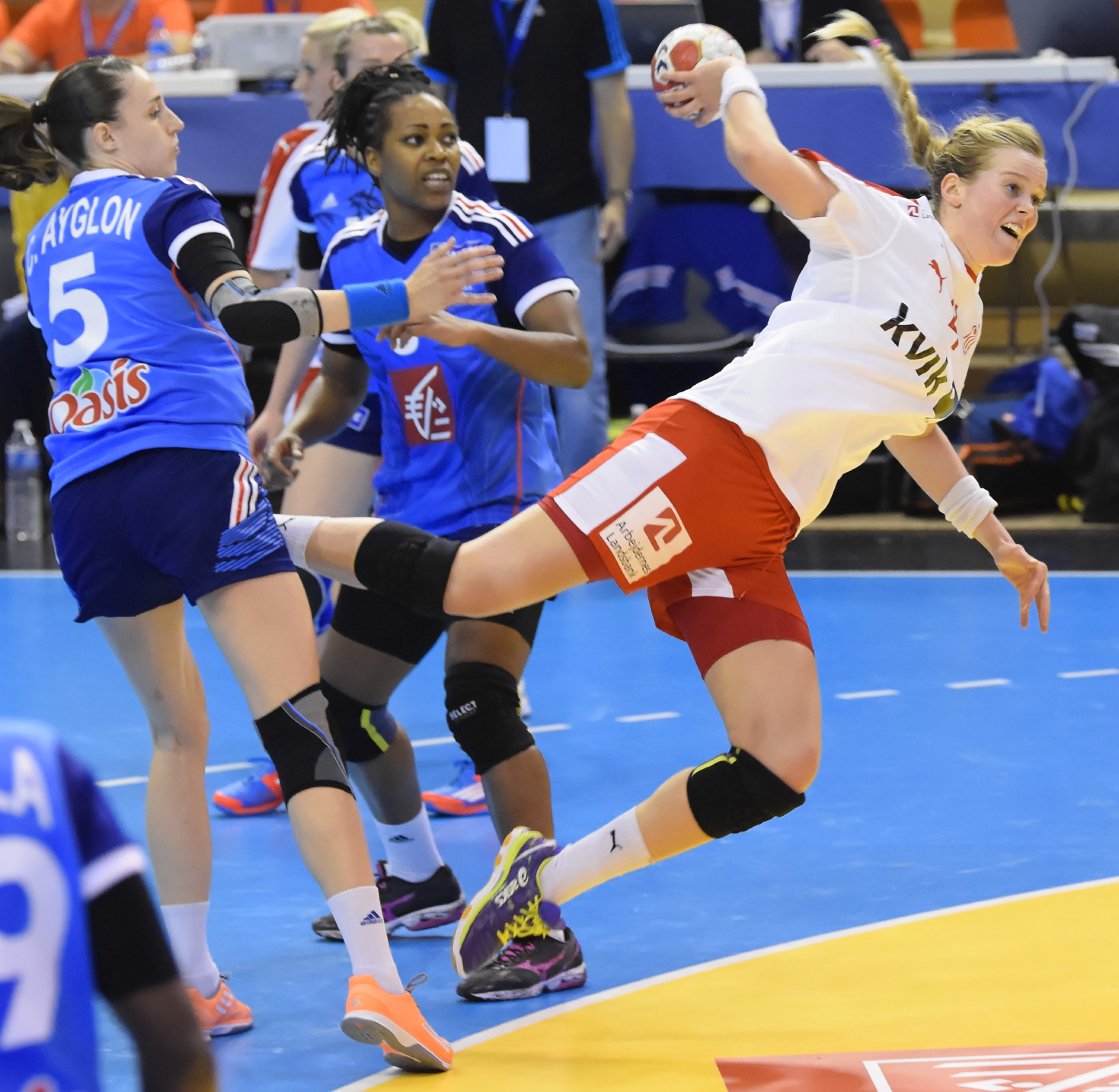
France – Denmark (Golden League).19 Mar. 2015

Susan Thorsgaard (born 13 October 1988) is a Danish former handball player, who played for the Danish women's national handball team.

At the 2010 European Women's Handball Championship she reached the bronze final and placed fourth with the Danish team.

In the 2012-13 edition of the Danish Handball Cup she was named MVP. Despite that she only finished second with FC Midtjylland Håndbold, losing to Viborg HK in the final.

At the 2013 World Championship, she was a part of the Danish team that won bronze medals, breaking a 9-year streak without medals for the Danish team. They beat Poland 30–26.
