= Jessica Helleberg =

Swedish handball player (born 1986)

Personal information
- Nationality: Swedish
- Born: 20 February 1986 (age 40) Partille, Sweden
- Height: 1.72 m (5 ft 8 in)

Sport
- Sport: Handball
- Position: Left wing
- Current club: HØJ Elite

Senior clubs
- Years: Team
- 2006-2011: IK Sävehof
- 2011-2013: Team Esbjerg
- 2013-2015: HC Odense
- 2020-2021: København Håndbold
- 2021-2023: Hvidovre IF
- 2023-: HØJ Elite
National team
Years	Team	Apps	(Gls)
2010-2014	Sweden	82	(128)
Medal record
European Championship
Silver medal – second place	2010 Denmark/Norway	Team
Bronze medal – third place	2014 Croatia/Hungary	Team
- Updated on 3 October 2023

Jessica Helleberg (born 20 February 1986) is a Swedish handball player, playing for the club HØJ Elite. She has previously played for the Swedish women's national handball team.

At the 2010 European Women's Handball Championship she reached the final and won a silver medal with the Swedish team.

In the 2024-25 season she was promoted with the team to the top flight in Denmark.
