= Louise Burgaard =

Danish handball player (born 1992)

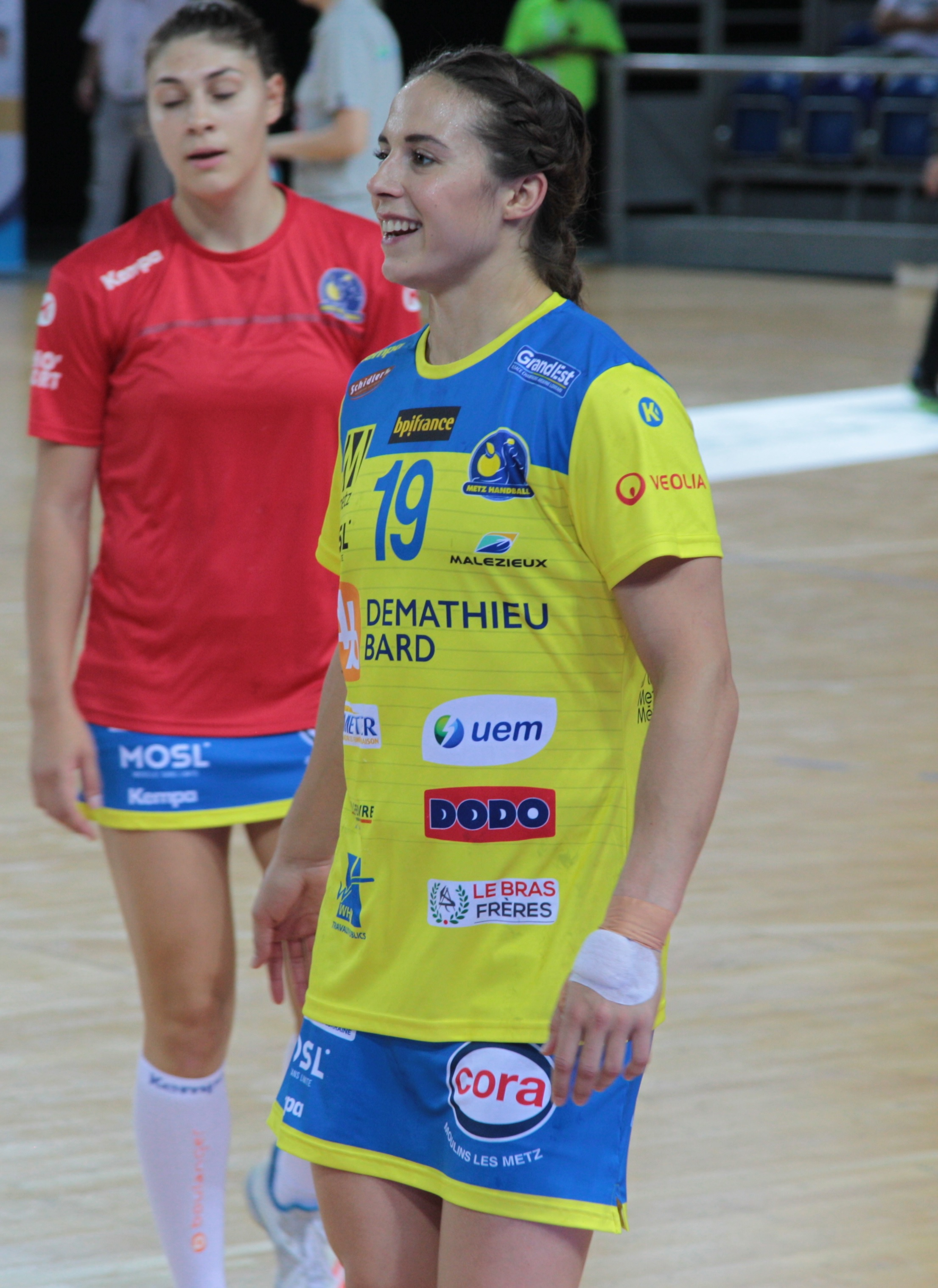
- Burgaard in 2019

Personal information
- Full name: Louise Katharina Vinter Burgaard
- Nationality: Danish
- Born: 17 October 1992 (age 34) Esbjerg, Denmark
- Height: 1.76 m (5 ft 9 in)

Sport
- Sport: Handball
- Position: Right back
- Current club: Odense Håndbold
- Number: 27

Senior clubs
- Years: Team
- 2008–2011: KIF Vejen
- 2011–2013: TTH Holstebro
- 2013–2015: Viborg HK
- 2015–2019: FCM Håndbold
- 2019–2024: Metz Handball
- 2024–: Odense Håndbold
National team
| Years | Team | Apps | (Gls) |
| 2011– | Denmark | 183 | (379) |
Medal record
Olympic Games
| Bronze medal – third place | 2024 Paris | Team |
World Championship
| Bronze medal – third place | 2013 Serbia |
| Bronze medal – third place | 2021 Spain |
| Bronze medal – third place | 2023 Denmark/Norway/Sweden |
European Championship
| Silver medal – second place | 2022 Slovenia/North Macedonia/Montenegro |
Junior European Championship
| Gold medal – first place | 2011 Netherlands |
European Youth Championship
| Gold medal – first place | 2009 Serbia |

Louise Katharina Vinter Burgaard (born 17 October 1992) is a Danish handballer for Odense Håndbold and the Danish national team.

She participated at the 2011 World Women's Handball Championship in Brazil, the 2012 Summer Olympics in London and the 2012 European Women's Handball Championship in Serbia. At the 2013 World Championship, she was a part of the Danish team that won bronze medals, breaking a 9-year streak without medals for the Danish team. They beat Poland 30–26.

== Club career ==
Burgaard started playing handball at Vinding SF when she was 5. In 2006 she signed for Fredericia HK. She has played for numerous Danish clubs, before in 2019 signing for the French club Metz Handball. Here she has won both the French cup and the LFH Division 1 Féminine multiple times.

In the 2024–25 season, she achieved a perfect regular season with Odense Håndbold, winning 26 of 26 games. Later the same season she won the Danish Championship, when Odense beat Team Esbjerg in the final 2–1 in matches.

== Achievements ==
=== Domestic ===
- Danish Championship:
  - Winner: 2014, 2025
  - Silver Medalist: 2013, 2016, 2019, 2026
  - Bronze Medalist: 2017
- French Championship:
  - Winner: 2022, 2023
  - Silver Medalist: 2021
- Danish Cup:
  - Winner: 2013, 2015
  - Finalist: 2016
- French Cup:
  - Winner: 2022, 2023

=== European ===
- EHF Cup:
  - Winner: 2013
- EHF Cup Winners' Cup:
  - Winner: 2014
- EHF Champions League:
  - Silver medalist: 2025
  - Bronze medalist: 2022

== Individual awards ==
- All-Star right back of the World Championship: 2023
- All-Star Right Back of the Junior World Championship: 2010
- All-Star Right Back of the Junior European Championship: 2011
- All-Star Right Back of the Danish League: 2013, 2019

== Personal life ==
She is married to Adreas Vinter. Because of their marriage, they both have the surname, Vinter Burgaard.
