= Rikke Iversen =

Danish handball player (born 1993)

Personal information
- Nationality: Danish
- Born: 18 May 1993 (age 33) Nykøbing Falster, Denmark
- Height: 1.78 m (5 ft 10 in)

Sport
- Sport: Handball
- Position: Pivot
- Current club: Team Esbjerg
- Number: 11

Senior clubs
- Years: Team
- 2010–2011: Virum-Sorgenfri HK
- 2011–2012: Lyngby HK
- 2012–2014: Nykøbing Falster HK
- 2014–2020: Silkeborg-Voel KFUM
- 2020–2023: Odense Håndbold
- 2023–: Team Esbjerg
National team
Years	Team	Apps	(Gls)
2015–	Denmark	99	(155)
Medal record
Olympic Games
Bronze medal – third place	2024 Paris	Team
World Championship
Bronze medal – third place	2021 Spain
Bronze medal – third place	2023 Denmark/Norway/Sweden
European Championship
Silver medal – second place	2022 Slovenia/North Macedonia/Montenegro
Silver medal – second place	2024 Austria/Hungary/Switzerland
Youth Olympic Games
Gold medal – first place	2010 Singapore	Team
- Updated on 16 January 2025

Rikke Iversen (born 18 May 1993) is a Danish handball player for Team Esbjerg and the Danish national team.

She is the sister of Sarah Iversen who plays for Ikast Håndbold.

== Career ==
She started playing handball at Virum-Sorgenfri Håndbold, and has previously played for Nykøbing Falster Håndboldklub and Odense Håndbold. With Odense Håndbold she won the Danish Women's Handball League twice in 2021 and 2022.

== National team ==
She debuted for the Danish national team in September 2015 against Slovenia, and has since represented Denmark at the 2020 European Women's Handball Championship and at the 2021 and 2023 world cups. She represented Denmark at the 2021 World Women's Handball Championship in Spain and at the 2023 World Women's Handball Championship at home. At the 2024 Olympics she won a bronze medal. Later the same year, she won silver medals at the 2024 European Championship, losing to Norway in the final.

In 2025 she took a break from handball due to maternity leave, which made her miss the 2025 World Championship. Sofie Bardrum was called up as the replacement.
