= Althea Reinhardt =

Danish handball player (born 1996)

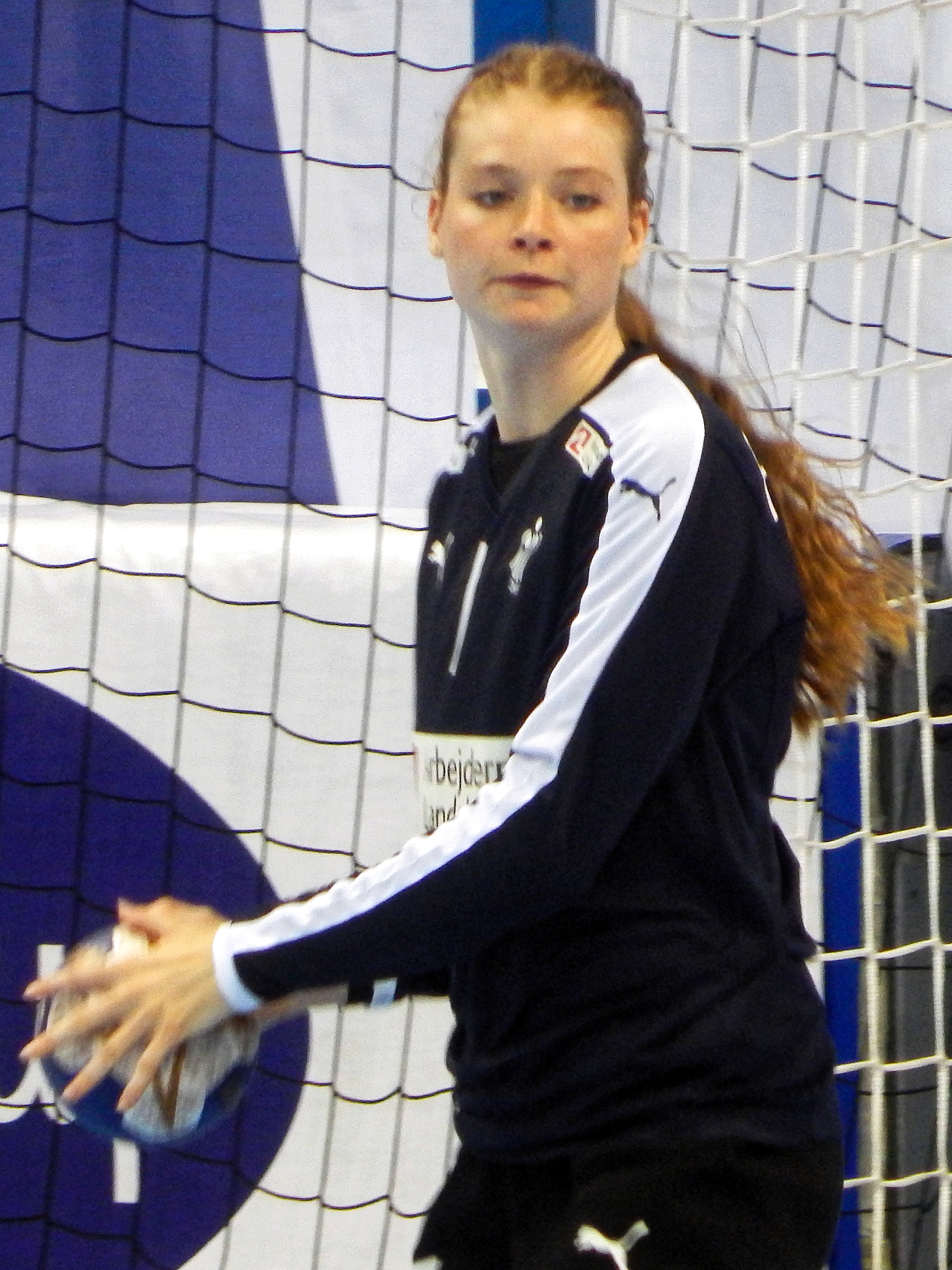
- Reinhardt in 2016

Personal information
- Full name: Althea Rebecca Reinhardt
- Nationality: Danish
- Born: 1 September 1996 (age 30) Aarhus, Denmark
- Height: 1.79 m (5 ft 10 in)

Sport
- Sport: Handball
- Position: Goalkeeper
- Current club: Odense Håndbold
- Number: 16

Youth career
- Years: Team
- 2007–2013: Nykøbing Falster Håndboldklub

Senior clubs
- Years: Team
- 2013–2015: NFH
- 2015–2016: Roskilde Håndbold
- 2016–: Odense Håndbold
National team
Years	Team	Apps	(Gls)
2016–	Denmark	131	(0)
Medal record
Olympic Games
Bronze medal – third place	2024 Paris	Team
World Championship
Bronze medal – third place	2021 Spain
Bronze medal – third place	2023 Denmark/Norway/Sweden
European Championship
Silver medal – second place	2022 Slovenia/North Macedonia/Montenegro
Silver medal – second place	2024 Austria/Hungary/Switzerland
IHF Junior World Championship
Gold medal – first place	2016 Russia
IHF Youth World Championship
Bronze medal – third place	2014 Macedonia
European Junior Championship
Gold medal – first place	2015 Spain
European Youth Championship
Bronze medal – third place	2013 Poland
- Updated on 16 January 2025

Althea Rebecca Reinhardt (born 1 September 1996) is a Danish handball player for Odense Håndbold and the Danish national team.

== Clubs career ==
She signed for Odense in 2016, after starting the career at Nykøbing Falster Håndboldklub. With Odense she won the Danish Cup in 2020 and the Danish League in 2021 and 2022. In the 2024-25 season, she achieved a perfect regular season with Odense Håndbold, winning 26 of 26 games. Later the same season she won the Danish Championship, when Odense beat Team Esbjerg in the final 2–1 in matches.

== National team ==
She was part of the national team that finished 4th at the 2016 European Championship in Sweden. A week before the tournament the goalkeeper Rikke Poulsen was reported injured, which led to Althea Reinhardt being a part of the Denmark squad at an international tournament for the first time.

She won bronze medals at both the 2021 and 2023 World Championships. At the 2024 Olympics she won another bronze medals.

On 8 December 2024 at a training session during the 2024 European Championship she suffered a concussion, which kept her out for over 3 months. She was replaced by Sandra Toft. she returned to the pitch on 1 April 2025. Despite her injury, she won silver medals, losing to Norway in the final.

She missed the 2025 World Championship due to injury and was replaced by Amalie Milling.

== Achievements ==
- EHF Champions League:
  - Silver: 2025
- Danish League:
  - Gold: 2025
  - Silver: 2026
- Women's U17 European Championship:
  - Bronze: 2013
- Women's Youth U18 World Championship:
  - Bronze: 2014
- Women's U19 European Championship:
  - Gold: 2015
- IHF Women's Junior World Championship:
  - Gold: 2016
- All-Star Team:
  - Best Goalkeeper: 2013, 2016
