= Sarah Iversen =

Danish handball player (born 1990)

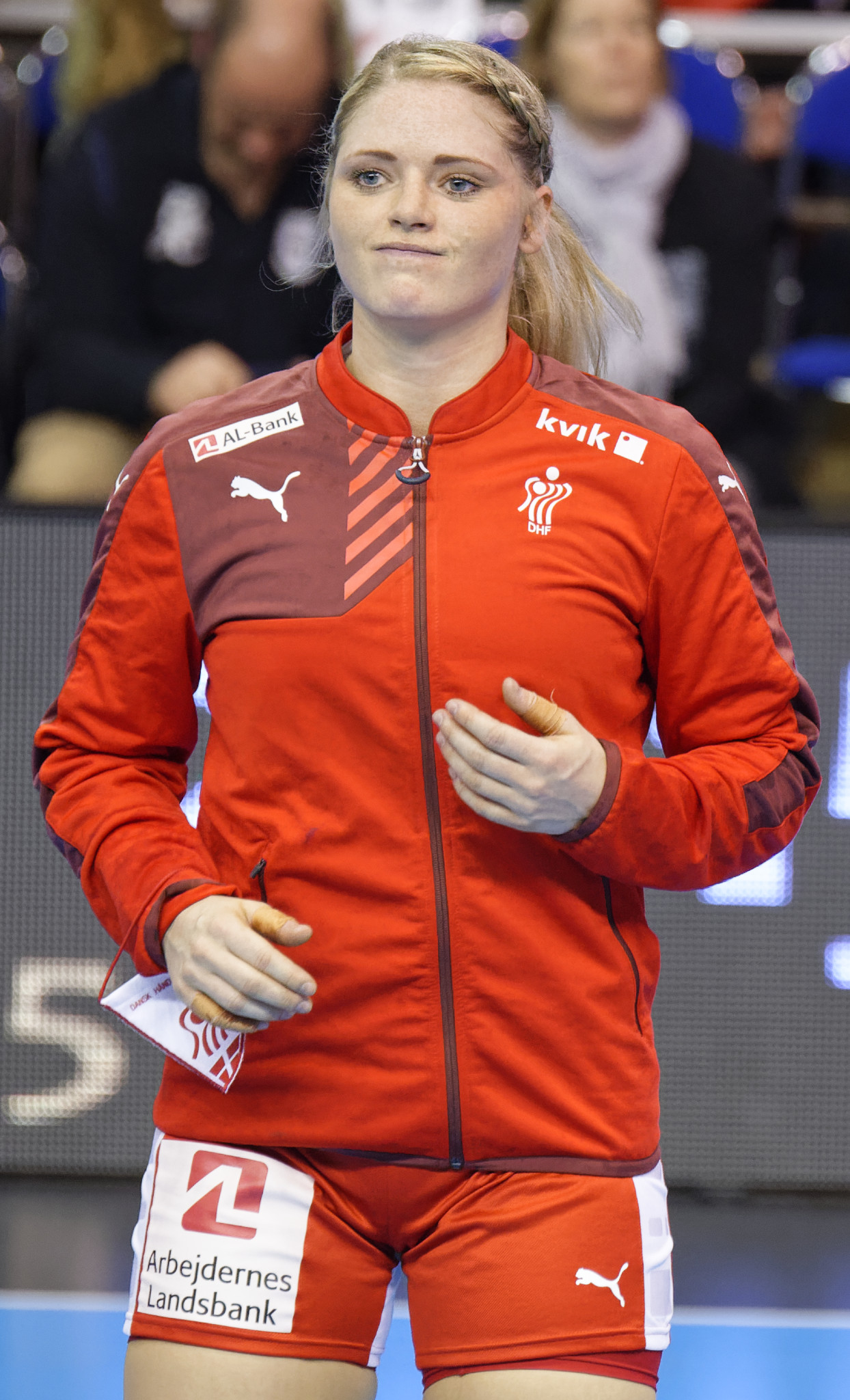
- Iversen in 2015

Personal information
- Full name: Sarah Aaberg Iversen
- Nationality: Danish
- Born: 10 April 1990 (age 36) Frederiksberg, Denmark
- Height: 1.74 m (5 ft 9 in)

Sport
- Sport: Handball
- Position: Pivot
- Current club: Ikast Håndbold
- Number: 11

Youth career
- Years: Team
- –: SNIK
- –: Lyngby HK
- –2008: Virum-Sorgenfri HK

Senior clubs
- Years: Team
- 2008–2009: Nordkøbenhavn Håndbold
- 2009–2012: Nykøbing Falster HK
- 2012–2016: Odense Håndbold
- 2016–2018: Nykøbing Falster HK
- 2018–: Ikast Håndbold
National team
Years	Team	Apps	(Gls)
2015–	Denmark	110	(184)
Medal record
Olympic Games
Bronze medal – third place	2024 Paris	Team
World Championship
Bronze medal – third place	2023 Denmark/Norway/Sweden
European Championship
Silver medal – second place	2022 Slovenia/North Macedonia/Montenegro
Silver medal – second place	2024 Austria/Hungary/Switzerland
IHF Youth World Championship
Bronze medal – third place	2008 Slovakia

Sarah Aaberg Iversen (born 10 April 1990) is a Danish handball player for Ikast Håndbold and the Danish national team.

She made her debut on the Danish national team on 19 March 2015, against France.

She is the elder sister of handballer Rikke Iversen.

== Career ==
Iversen played youth handball at SNIK, Lyngby HK and Virum-Sorgenfri HK. In 2008 she switched to second-tier side Nordkøbenhavn Håndbold. After a year she switched to Nykøbing Falster Håndboldklub. In 2012/2013 season, she moved to HC Odense, but returned to Nykøbing Falster after 4 seasons.

She represented Denmark at the 2017 World Women's Handball Championship in Germany, where Denmark finished 6th.

In the 2018/2019 season, she moved to Herning-Ikast Håndbold. In her first season, she won the Danish Cup. In the summer of 2020, she took a break due to pregnancy, which made her miss the 2020 European Women's Handball Championship.

At the 2022 European Women's Handball Championship she won silver medals with the Danish team, losing to Norway in the final. Sarah Iversen scored ten goals during the tournament.

In 2023, she won the EHF European League with Ikast Håndbold. Later the same year she won bronze medals at the 2023 World Women's Handball Championship. Iversen erzielte im Turnierverlauf 15 Treffer.

At the 2024 Olympics she won a bronze medal. Later the same year, she won silver medals at the 2024 European Championship, losing to Norway in the final.

In 2025 she took a break from handball due to maternity leave, which made her miss the 2025 World Championship. Sofie Bardrum was called up as the replacement.

== Achievements ==
- Damehåndboldligaen:
  - Winner: 2017
  - Silver Medalist: 2019
- Danish Cup:
  - Winner: 2019
- EHF Cup:
  - Semifinalist: 2017, 2019
- EHF European League:
  - Winner: 2023

== Individual awards ==
- All-Star Pivot of Damehåndboldligaen: 2017/18
