= Sandra Toft =

Danish handball player (born 1989)

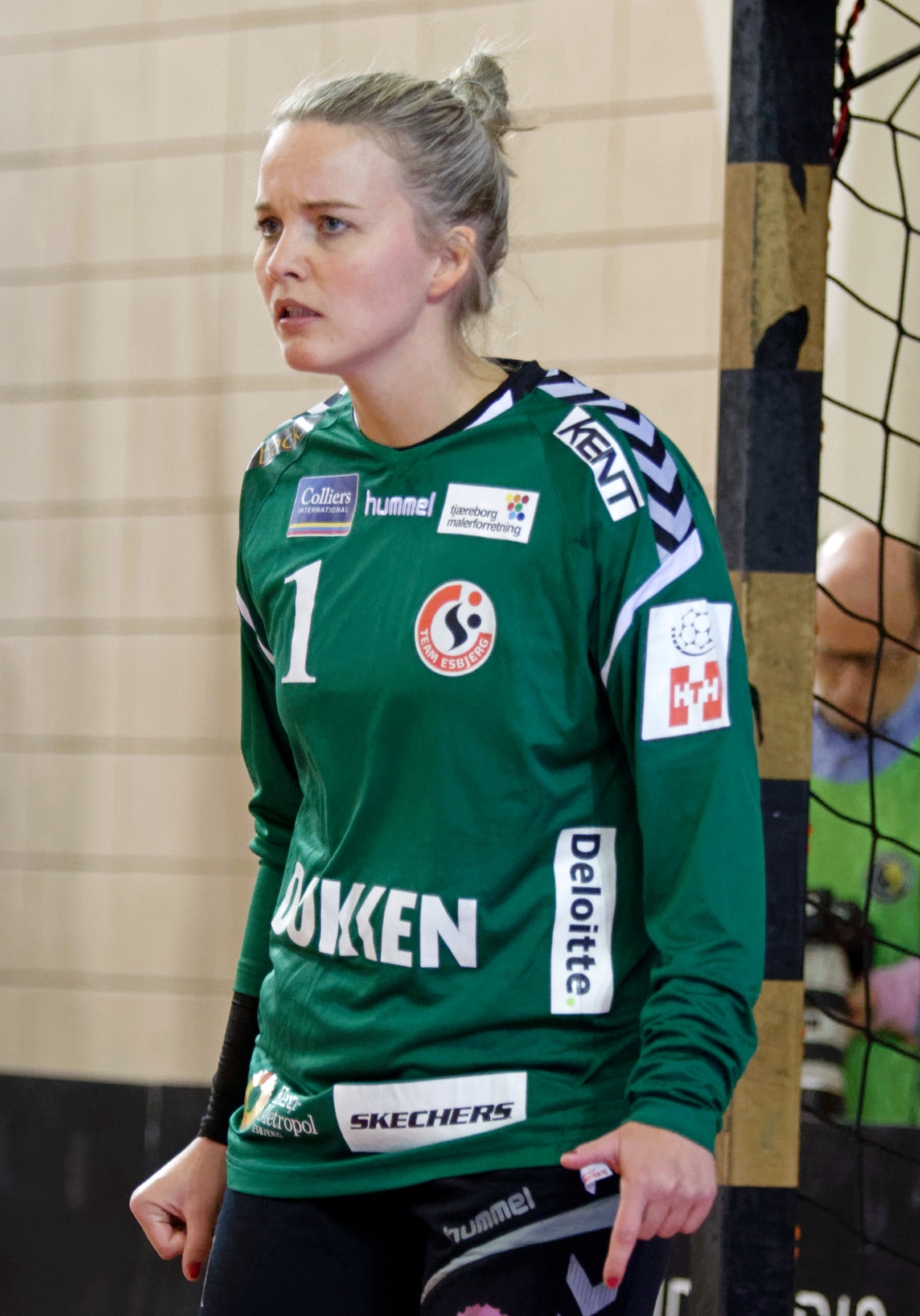
- Toft in 2018

Personal information
- Full name: Sandra Toft
- Nationality: Danish
- Born: 18 October 1989 (age 37) Gribskov, Denmark
- Height: 1.76 m (5 ft 9 in)

Sport
- Sport: Handball
- Position: Goalkeeper
- Current club: Győri ETO KC
- Number: 89

Senior clubs
- Years: Team
- 2006–2007: Virum-Sorgenfri HK
- 2007–2014: TTH Holstebro
- 2014–2017: Larvik HK
- 2017–2019: Team Esbjerg
- 2019–2022: Brest Bretagne HB
- 2022–: Győri ETO KC
National team
Years	Team	Apps	(Gls)
2008–	Denmark	195	(2)
Medal record
Olympic Games
Bronze medal – third place	2024 Paris	Team
World Championship
Bronze medal – third place	2021 Spain
Bronze medal – third place	2023 Denmark/Norway/Sweden
European Championship
Silver medal – second place	2022 Slovenia/North Macedonia/Montenegro
Silver medal – second place	2024 Austria/Hungary/Switzerland
Junior World Championship
Silver medal – second place	2008 Macedonia
Youth World Championship
Gold medal – first place	2006 Canada
European Junior Championship
Gold medal – first place	2007 Turkey
- Updated on 5 January 2025

Sandra Toft (born 18 October 1989) is a Danish professional handball goalkeeper for Győri ETO KC and the Danish national team. She is the fifth most capped player ever on the Danish national team with 195 appeances.

== National team ==
She made her debut on the Danish national team on 27 March 2008, against Czech Republic.

She participated for the first time in a major international at the 2011 World Women's Handball Championship in Brazil, where she was the third choice keeper behind Karin Mortensen and Christina Pedersen.

She missed the 2013 World Cup in Serbia due to illness.

At the 2014 European Championship she finished 7th with the Danish team. The year after she was on the Danish team that finished 6th at the 2015 World Cup.

At the 2016 European Championship Denmark reached the semifinal but would ultimately only get a 4th place. Toft was selected for the tournament all star team. At the 2020 European Championship they finished 4th again and again Toft was selected for the all star team.

At the 2021 World Cup she won her first medals with Denmark when they took bronze medals. Once again she was in the all-star team.

At the 2022 European Women's Handball Championship she won silver medals with the Danish team, losing to Norway in the final.

At the 2024 Olympics she won bronze medals with the Danish team.

At the 2024 European Women's Handball Championship Danish head coach Jesper Jensen surprisingly chose to leave her out of the team in favour of Anna Kristensen. Following an injury to Althea Reinhardt midway through the tournament, she did however enter the team and went on to win silver medals.

She missed the 2025 World Championship due to pregnancy.

== Club career ==
=== Pre-professional career ===
Toft started playing handbold at Team Helsinge, before joining Virum-Sorgenfri Håndboldklub in 2002 at the age of 14. In 2007, she joined Team Tvis Holstebro for her first professional contract.

=== Team Tvis Holstebro ===
At TTH Holstebro, she was part of the team that reached the 2010/2011 Women's EHF European League final, where they lost to league rivals FC Midtjylland Håndbold. In 2012/2013, TTH Holstebro with Toft in goal manage to reach the final once again and win it this time. Toft almost missed the match due to an injury in her left knee in January 2012.

==== Car crash in 2009 ====
In 2009, Toft was driving back home from North Zealand when she lost control over her vehicle. At 10 pm, north of the city Give, the car spun off the road, flew 50 metres across a field and made four rollovers. Toft survived the car crash, but suffered a severe neck vertebra collapse. Only five months later, she was back on court for Team Tvis Holstebro.

=== Larvik ===
In the summer 2014, Toft signed with Norwegian club Larvik HK. Here, she won the Norwegian Championship and the Norwegian cup three times each in the four years she played for the club.

She also reached the EHF Champions League final in 2015 where Larvik HK lost to Montenegrin side ŽRK Budućnost. After the tournament She was a part of the tournament all star team as the Best EHF Goalkeeper 2014/2015.

=== Team Esbjerg ===
Toft returned to Danish handball in 2017/2018 on a two-year contract. She won the Danish Cup in 2017 and the 2018–19 Danish League with the club. In 2019, Toft once again reached the Women's EHF European League final, but this time her club lost to Hungarian side Siófok KC.

=== Brest ===
In 2019, she joined the French top club Brest Bretagne Handball, where she reached the final of the 2020–21 Women's EHF Champions League. Once again, Toft lost a European final, this time to Norwegian Vipers Kristiansand. The same season she won the domestic double with the club.

=== Győr ===
In 2022, she signed with Hungarian side Győri ETO KC, where she won the Hungarian Championship in her first season.

She then won the 2023–24 and 2024–25 Women's EHF Champions League.

== Achievements ==
- EHF Champions League:
  - Winner: 2024, 2025
  - Silver: 2015, 2019, 2021
- Women's EHF European League
  - Winner: 2013
  - Silver: 2011
- Norwegian Championship
  - Winner: 2015, 2016, 2017
- Norwegian Women's Handball Cup
  - Winner: 2015, 2016, 2017
- Danish Championship
  - Winner: 2019
- Danish Women's Handball Cup
  - Winner: 2017
- LFH Division 1 Féminine
  - Winner: 2021
- French Cup
  - Winner: 2021
- Hungarian Championship
  - Winner: 2022, 2023, 2025

== Individual awards ==
- IHF World Player of the Year – Women: 2021
- All-Star Goalkeeper of the World Championship: 2021
- All-Star Goalkeeper of the European Championship: 2016, 2020
- EHF Excellence Awards: Goalkeeper of the Season 2023/24
- All-Star Team Best Goalkeeper of the EHF Champions League: 2015
- Handball-Planet.com All-Star Goalkeeper of the Year: 2019
