= 2025–26 Kvindeligaen =

Kvindeligaen
- Season: 2025–26
- Champions: Team Esbjerg
- Relegated: Bjerringbro FH
- Champions League: Team Esbjerg, Odense Håndbold
- EHF European League: NHF, Viborg HK, HH Elite
- Matches: 182
- Top goalscorer: (Denmark) Julie Scaglione (225 goals)
- Longest unbeaten run: Team Esbjerg 35

The 2025–26 Kvindeligaen is the 90th season of Kvindeligaen, Denmark's premier women's handball league. Odense Håndbold are the defending champions, while HØJ Elite was promoted from the 1. division.

Team Esbjerg won the regular season without losing a single match. Bjerringbro FH were relegated to the 1st Division after finishing last in the regular season. Team Esbjerg later won the title, when they beat Odense Håndbold in the final in 3 matches.

== Team information ==
Locations of the 2025–26 Damehåndboldligaen

Team.	Town	Arena	Capacity
EH Aalborg	Aalborg	Nørresundby Idrætscenter	800
HH Elite	Horsens	Forum Horsens	4,000
Ikast Håndbold	Ikast	IBF Arena	2,850
København Håndbold	København	Frederiksberghallen	1,468
HØJ Elite	Ølstykke; Jyllinge	Ølstykke-Hallen	500
Nykøbing Falster Håndboldklub	Nykøbing Falster	Spar Nord Arena	1,300
Odense Håndbold	Odense	Sydbank Arena	2,256
Bjerringbro FH	Bjerringbro	Bjerringbro Idrætscenter	800
Silkeborg-Voel KFUM	Silkeborg	Jysk Arena	3,000
Skanderborg Håndbold	Skanderborg	Skanderborg Fælled	1,700
Team Esbjerg	Esbjerg	Blue Water Dokken	2,549
SønderjyskE	Aabenraa	Arena Aabenraa	1,400
Ringkøbing Håndbold	Ringkøbing	Green Sports Arena	1,200
Viborg HK	Viborg	BioCirc Arena	3,000

=== Personnel and kits ===
Team	Sporting director	Coach	Kit producer
Silkeborg-Voel KFUM	Jakob Andreasen	(Denmark) Peter Schilling Laursen	Adidas
Ikast Håndbold	Daniel Grønhøj	(Denmark) Søren Reinholt Hansen	Select
HH Elite	Jørgen Møller	(Greenland) Jakob Larsen	Hummel
HØJ Elite	Lars Vinther	(Denmark) Kristian Kristensen	Craft Sportswear
København Håndbold	Louise Svalastog	(Denmark) Bo Spellerberg	Hummel
Nykøbing Falster Håndboldklub	Kenneth Sahlholdt	(Denmark) Niels Agesen	Puma
Ringkøbing Håndbold	Michelle Brandstrup	(Denmark) Jesper Holmris	Hummel
EH Aalborg	Simon Aagaard	(Denmark) Morten Frandsen Holmen	Adidas
Bjerringbro FH	Dennis Jensen	(Denmark) Martin Albertsen	Adidas
Skanderborg Håndbold	Jens Christensen	(Denmark) Kim Johansen	Puma
Odense Håndbold	Lasse Honoré	(Denmark) Jakob Vestergaard	Craft Sportswear
SønderjyskE Håndbold	Henrik Jepsen	(Denmark) Peter Nielsen	Hummel
Viborg HK	Jens Steffensen	(Denmark) Ole Bitsch	Puma
Team Esbjerg	Hans Christian Warrer	(Sweden) Tomas Axnér	Hummel

== Regular season ==
=== Standings ===
Pos	Team	Pld	W	D	L	GF	GA	GD	Pts	Qualification or relegation
1	Team Esbjerg	26	25	1	0	920	668	+252	51	Championship play-offs + advance to Champions League
2	Odense Håndbold	26	24	0	2	906	710	+196	48	Championship play-offs
3	Nykøbing Falster	26	20	0	6	848	693	+155	40	Championship play-offs
4	Ikast Håndbold	26	19	1	6	857	761	+96	39	Championship play-offs
5	Viborg HK	26	16	1	9	834	781	+53	33	Championship play-offs
6	København Håndbold	26	13	0	13	821	826	−5	26	Championship play-offs
7	HH Elite	26	10	0	16	734	762	−28	20	Championship play-offs
8	SønderjyskE	26	9	2	15	708	809	−101	20	Championship play-offs
9	HØJ Elite	26	9	1	16	704	799	−95	19	
10	Silkeborg-Voel KFUM	26	7	4	15	751	826	−75	18	
11	Ringkøbing Håndbold	26	7	2	17	763	845	−82	16	
12	EH Aalborg	26	7	1	18	770	857	−87	15	
13	Skanderborg Håndbold	26	5	2	19	704	818	−114	12	
14	Bjerringbro FH	26	3	1	22	723	888	−165	7	Relegation to 1. division

Rules for classification: 1.) Points in head-to-head matches amongst tied teams; 2.) Goal difference in head-to-head matches amongst tied teams; 3.) Goals scored in head-to-head matches among tied teams; 4.) Points in all matches; 5.) Goal difference in all matches.

== Playoffs ==
=== Pot 1 ===
Pos	Team	Pld	W	D	L	GF	GA	GD	Pts	Qualification
1	Team Esbjerg (Note: Including 2 bonus points)	6	6	0	0	209	157	+52	14	Semi final
2	Nykøbing Falster Håndboldklub (Note: including 1 bonus point)	6	4	0	2	187	188	−1	9	Semi final
3	København Håndbold	6	1	0	5	182	195	−13	2	
4	Sønderjyske	6	1	0	5	168	206	−38	2	

=== Pot 2 ===
Pos	Team	Pld	W	D	L	GF	GA	GD	Pts	Qualification
1	Odense Håndbold (Note: Including 2 bonus points)	6	5	0	1	203	175	+28	12	Semi final
2	Ikast Håndbold (Note: Including 1 bonus point)	6	5	0	1	200	181	+19	11	Semi final
3	Viborg HK	6	2	0	4	184	188	−4	4	
4	HH Elite	6	0	0	6	147	190	−43	0	

=== Playoff ===
==== Semi final ====
Date		Home team - Match 1	Home team - Match 2	Result	
1st match	2nd match	Home team - Match 1	Home team - Match 2	1st match	2nd match
13.05	21.05	Team Esbjerg	Ikast Håndbold	37-21	29-26
13.05	21.05	Odense Håndbold	Nykøbing Falster	34-26	31-27

- The match is decided in best of 3. If the result is even after 2 matches, a third match is played.

==== Third place playoff ====
Date		Home team - Match 1 IBF Arena	Home team - Match 2 Frederiksberghallen	Result	
1st match	2nd match	Home team - Match 1 IBF Arena	Home team - Match 2 Frederiksberghallen	1st match	2nd match
27.05	30.05	Nykøbing Falster	Ikast Håndbold	36-34	29-28

- The match is decided in best of 3. If the result is even after 2 matches, a third match is played.

=== Final ===
Date			Home team - Match 1 and 3 Blue Water Dokken	Home team - Match 2 Sydbank Arena	Result		
1st match	2nd match	3rd match	Home team - Match 1 and 3 Blue Water Dokken	Home team - Match 2 Sydbank Arena	1st match	2nd match	3rd match
27.05	30.05	02.06	Team Esbjerg	Odense Håndbold	37-30	30-33	35-29

- The match is decided in best of 3. If the result is even after 2 matches, a third match is played.

=== Relegation table ===
Pos	Team	Pld	W	D	L	GF	GA	GD	Pts	Qualification
1	HØJ Elite	4	3	1	0	142	114	+28	9	
2	Ringkøbing Håndbold	4	3	0	1	129	117	+12	7	
3	Silkeborg-Voel KFUM	4	2	0	2	118	127	−9	4	
4	Skanderborg Håndbold	4	1	1	2	132	134	−2	3	
5	EH Aalborg	4	0	0	4	112	141	−29	1	Relegation playoff

=== Relegation playoff ===
Date			Home team - Match 1 and 3	Home team - Match 2	Result		
1st match	2nd match	3rd match	Home team - Match 1 and 3	Home team - Match 2	1st match	2nd match	3rd match
18.04	25.04		Ajax København	Rødovre HK	19-18	24-18	
09.05	13.05	17.05	EH Aalborg	Ajax København	28-25	23-21	31-26

== Statistics ==
=== Topscorers ===
==== Regular season ====
Rank	Name	Club	Goals
1	(Denmark) Emilie Ytting Pedersen	København Håndbold	181
2	(Denmark) Frida Høgaard Nielsen	Ringkøbing Håndbold	170
3	(Denmark) Astrid Lynnerup	Skanderborg Håndbold	168
4	(Denmark) Emma Ejrup Navne	HØJ	164
5	(Sweden) Clara Lerby	NFH	158
5	(Denmark) Julie Scaglione	Ikast Håndbold	158
7	(Denmark) Verona Rexhepi	Ringkøbing Håndbold	154
8	(Norway) Stine Skogrand	Ikast Håndbold	151
9	(Denmark) Line Berggren Larsen	København Håndbold	150
10	(Denmark) Carla Thomsen	EH Aalborg	143

==== Total ====
Rank	Name	Club	Goals
1	(Denmark) Julie Scaglione	Ikast Håndbold	225
2	(Sweden) Clara Lerby	NFH	223
3	(Norway) Henny Reistad	Team Esbjerg	217
4	(Norway) Stine Skogrand	Ikast Håndbold	215
5	(Denmark) Emilie Ytting	København Håndbold	214
6	(Denmark) Astrid Lynnerup	Skanderborg Håndbold	204
7	(Denmark) Emma Ejrup Navne	HØJ Elite	200
8	(Denmark) Frida Høgaard Nielsen	Ringkøbing Håndbold	195
9	(Denmark) Verona Rexhepi	Ringkøbing Håndbold	191
10	(Denmark) Mia Solberg Svele	NFH	183

=== All star team ===
The team of the season was released on 13 May 2025.

==== Regular season ====
Position	Name	Club
Goalkeeper	(Denmark) Anna Kristensen	Team Esbjerg
Right wing	(Denmark) Cecilie Brandt	Ikast Håndbold
Right back	(Norway) Stine Skogrand	Ikast Håndbold
Centre back	(Norway) Henny Reistad	Team Esbjerg
Left back	(Norway) Thale Deila	Odense Håndbold
Left wing	(Denmark) Emilie Ytting	København Håndbold
Pivot	(Denmark) Ida-Marie Dahl	Sønderjyske

==== Coach of the season ====
(Denmark) Anders Friis - Viborg HK
