= Elín Þorsteinsdóttir =

Icelandic handball player (born 1996)

Personal information
- Full name: Elín Jóna Þorsteinsdóttir
- Nationality: Icelandic
- Born: 30 November 1996 (age 29) Reykjavík, Iceland
- Height: 1.77 m (5 ft 10 in)

Sport
- Sport: Handball
- Position: Goalkeeper
- Current club: Aarhus United
- Number: 1

Senior clubs
- Years: Team
- 2014-2015: Grótta HK
- 2015-2018: Haukar Handball
- 2018-2021: Vendsyssel Håndbold
- 2021–2023: Ringkøbing Håndbold
- 2021–2023: EH Aalborg
- 2023–: Aarhus United
National team
Years	Team	Apps	(Gls)
2017-	Iceland	63	(4)
- Updated on 14 November 2024

Elín Jóna Þorsteinsdóttir (born 30 November 1996) is an Icelandic handball player for the Danish team Aarhus United and the Icelandic national team.

In April 2021, she signed a two-year contract with Danish Ringkøbing Håndbold. Before moving to Denmark and Vendsyssel Håndbold in the Danish 1st Division, Elin played for Haukar Handball in the Úrvalsdeild kvenna.

After two years at Ringkøbing, she joined EH Aalborg, where she played for a season before joining Aarhus United. In the 2024-25 season she was relegated with Aarhus Håndbold after finishing last in the regular season.
