= 2017–18 Danish 1st Division (women) =

Danish Women's 1st Division
- Season: 2017–18
- Matches: 55
- Goals: 2,606 (47.38 per match)
- Top goalscorer: Line Gyldenløve Kristensen (147 goals)
- Biggest home win: 22 goals: EHA 39–17 AGF (9 Oct)
- Biggest away win: 14 goals: RHK 18–32 ROS (10 Sep)
- Highest scoring: 59 goals: ROS 28–31 EHA (15 Oct)
- All statistics correct as of 26 March 2018.

The 2017–18 1st Division is the 2017–18 season of the highest division and second-highest handball league in the Danish league system. The winner of 1st division is granted direct promotion to the league. Ajax København were the winners of the 2016–17 season.

== Team information ==
Team.	Town	Arena
EH Aalborg	Aalborg	Nørresundby Idrætscenter
AGF Håndbold	Aarhus	Atletion
Bjerringbro FH	Bjerringbro	Bjerringbro Idrætspark
Fredericia HK 1990	Fredericia	thansen.dk ARENA
Gudme HK	Gudme	SU'VI:T Arena
Hadsten Håndbold	Hadsten	Vestjysk Bank Arena
Horsens HK	Horsens	Forum Horsens
Lyngby HK	Lyngby	Lyngbyhallen
Roskilde Håndbold	Roskilde	Roskilde Hallerne
Rødovre HK	Rødovre	Rødovre Stadionhal
Skanderborg Håndbold	Skanderborg	Fælledhallen
SønderjyskE Håndbold	Aabenraa	Aabenraa Idrætscenter
TMS Ringsted	Ringsted	Dansk Kabel TV Arena
Vendsyssel Håndbold	Vendsyssel	Arena Nord

== Standings ==
Pos	Team	Pld	W	D	L	GF	GA	GD	Pts	Qualification or relegation
1	EH Aalborg	23	21	0	2	649	514	+135	42	Direct promotion to the 2018–19 Damehåndboldligaen
2	Skanderborg Håndbold	23	19	0	4	609	481	+128	38	Direct promotion to the 2018–19 Damehåndboldligaen
3	SønderjyskE Håndbold	23	17	1	5	616	537	+79	35	Promotion play-offs
4	Horsens HK	23	15	1	7	546	474	+72	31	
5	Hadsten Håndbold	23	13	2	8	568	545	+23	28	
6	Roskilde Håndbold	23	13	0	10	606	551	+55	26	
7	Fredericia HK	23	12	1	10	573	557	+16	25	
8	TMS Ringsted	23	11	2	10	575	545	+30	24	
9	Vendsyssel Håndbold	23	9	1	13	543	594	−51	19	
10	Bjerringbro FH	23	9	1	13	549	569	−20	19	
11	Gudme HK	23	8	1	14	507	560	−53	17	
12	AGF Håndbold	23	4	1	18	501	646	−145	9	Relegation play-offs
13	Lyngby HK	23	2	4	17	484	572	−88	8	Relegation play-offs
14	Rødovre HK	23	0	1	22	463	642	−179	1	Relegation play-offs

Updated to match(es) played on 13 January 2018. Source:
Rules for classification: 1.) Points in head-to-head matches amongst tied teams; 2.) Goal difference in head-to-head matches amongst tied teams; 3.) Goals scored in head-to-head matches among tied teams; 4.) Points in all matches; 5.) Goal difference in all matches.

== Top scorers ==
As of 26 March 2018.

Rank	Player	Club	Goals
1	(Denmark) Line Gyldenløve Kristensen	Bjerringbro FH	147
2	(Denmark) Line Werngren Nielsen	Roskilde Håndbold	139
3	(Denmark) Ida Staxan Lagerbon	Fredericia HK	133
4	(Denmark) Ilda Kepic	Vendsyssel Håndbold	130
5	(Denmark) Simone Dillon	Rødovre HK	121
6	(Denmark) Cecilie Nordstrøm	Gudme HK	120
7	(Denmark) Josefine Orby Poulsen	Hadsten Sports Klub Håndbold	115
8	(Denmark) Trine Knudsen	Skanderborg Håndbold	114
9	(Denmark) Laura Damgaard Lund	EH Aalborg	133
10	(Denmark) Louise Sønnichsen	AGF Håndbold	108

== Number of teams by regions ==
	Region	No. teams	Teams
1	Midtjylland	5	Hadsten Håndbold, Horsens HK, Skanderborg Håndbold, Bjerringbro FH, AGF Håndbold,
2	Syddanmark	3	SønderjyskE Håndbold, Fredericia HK, Gudme HK
3	Nordjylland	2	EH Aalborg, Vendsyssel Håndbold
4	Sjælland	2	TMS Ringsted, Roskilde Håndbold
5	Hovedstaden	2	Lyngby HK, Rødovre HK

== See also ==
- Handball
- Danish Men's Handball League
- Danish Women's Handball League
