= Sabine Englert =

German handball player (born 1981)

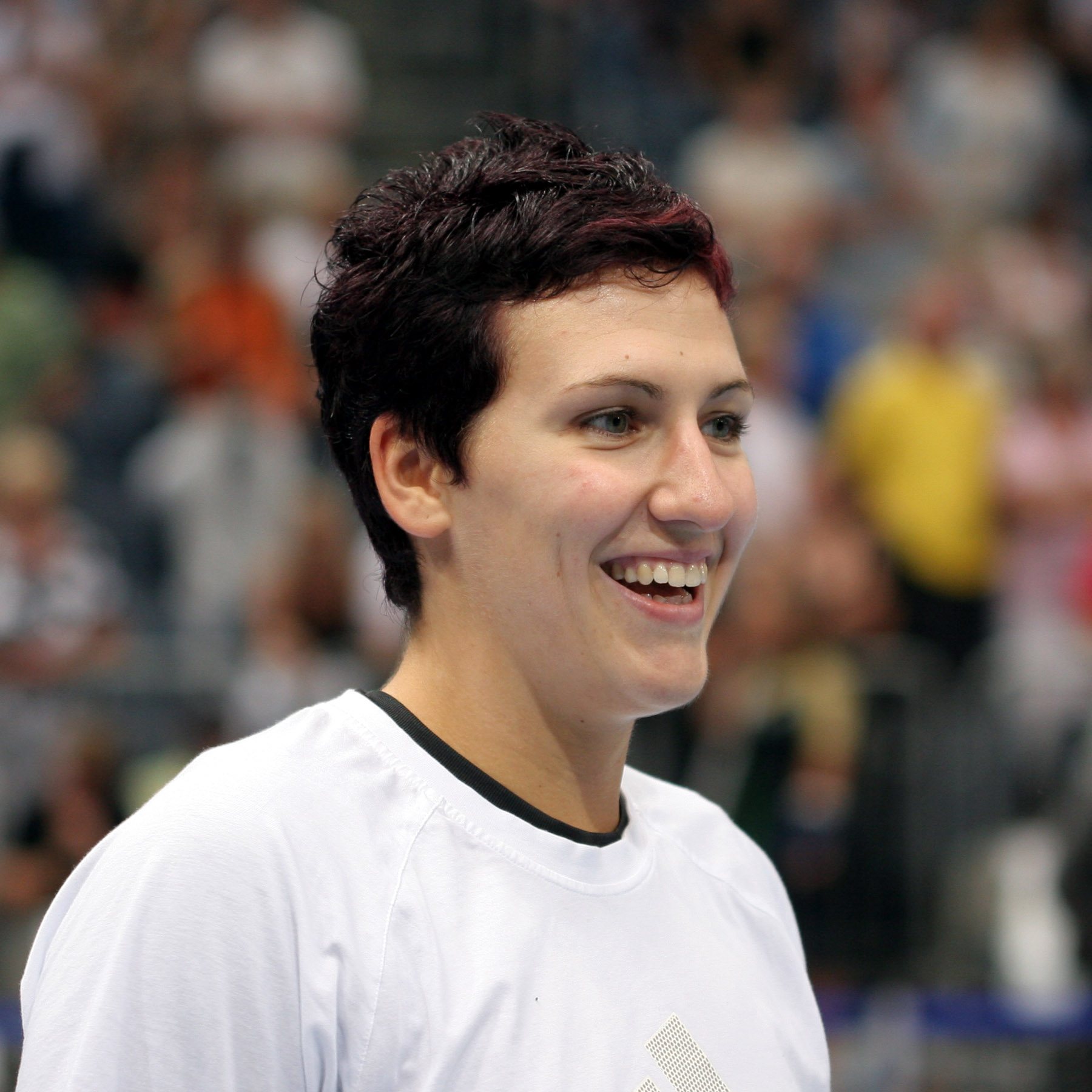

Personal information
- Full name: Sabine Englert
- Nationality: German
- Born: 27 November 1981 (age 44) Aschaffenburg, West Germany
- Height: 1.85 m (6 ft 1 in)

Sport
- Sport: Handball
- Position: Goalkeeper
- Current club: Aarhus Håndbold
- Number: 86

Senior clubs
- Years: Team
- 1999-2000: TGS Walldorf
- 2000-2003: TV Mainzler
- 2003-2007: Bayer Leverkusen
- 2007-2009: Hypo Niederösterreich
- 2009-2022: Herning-Ikast Håndbold
- 2022-: Aarhus Håndbold
National team
Years	Team	Apps	(Gls)
2001-2011	Germany	206	(2)
Medal record
World Championship
Bronze medal – third place	2007 France	Team

Sabine Englert (born 27 November 1981) is a German team handball goalkeeper, who currently plays in Aarhus Håndbold and previously for the German national team.

She has previously played for the Austrian club Hypo Niederösterreich, Bayer Leverkusen in Germany and 13 seasons for Herning-Ikast Håndbold.

== International career ==
Englert made her debut on the German team in 2001. She received a bronze medal at the 2007 World Championship.

She competed at the 2008 Summer Olympics in Beijing, where Germany finished 11th.

== Club career ==
Englert was Austrian champion with Hypo Niederösterreich in 2008.

In the 2024-25 season she was relegated with Aarhus Håndbold after finishing last in the regular season.

== Individual awards ==
- All-Star Goalkeeper of the Danish League: 2019
- Danish Handball Cup MVP 2019
