= 2021 European Women's U-17 Handball Championship =

Tournament details
- Host country: Montenegro
- Venues: 2 (in 1 host city)
- Dates: 5–15 August
- Teams: 16 (from 1 confederation)

Final positions
- Champions: Hungary (2nd title)
- Runners-up: Germany
- Third place: Russia
- Fourth place: Denmark

Tournament statistics
- Matches played: 56
- Goals scored: 3,016 (53.86 per match)
- Attendance: 5,957 (106 per match)
- Top scorer(s): (Germany) Viola Leuchter (55 goals)

Awards
- Best player: (Hungary) Júlia Farkas

The 2021 European Women's U-17 Handball Championship was the 15th edition of the European Women's U-17 Handball Championship, which was held in Podgorica, Montenegro from 5 to 15 August 2021.

== Qualification ==
Competition	Dates	Host	Vacancies	Qualified
Women's 17 EHF EURO 2019	1–11 August 2019	Slovenia	14	Hungary; Sweden; France; Denmark; Russia; Norway; Germany; Austria; Montenegro; Slovenia; Romania; Slovakia; Portugal; Croatia
Women's 17 EHF Championship 2019	3–11 August 2019	(Italy) Lignano Sabbiadoro	1	Czech Republic
Women's 17 EHF Championship 2019	3–11 August 2019	(Georgia (country)) Tbilisi	1	Switzerland

== Draw ==
The draw was held on 10 February 2021 in Vienna.

Pot 1	Pot 2	Pot 3	Pot 4
Denmark; France; Hungary; Sweden	Austria; Germany; Norway; Russia	Montenegro; Romania; Slovakia; Slovenia	Croatia; Czech Republic; Portugal; Switzerland

== Preliminary round ==
All times are local (UTC+2).

=== Group A ===
Pos	Team	Pld	W	D	L	GF	GA	GD	Pts	Qualification
1	Montenegro (H)	3	2	0	1	83	66	+17	4 (Note: Montenegro 2 Pts, +6 GD; Denmark 2 Pts, +4 GD; Switzerland 2 Pts, –10 GD)	Main round
2	Denmark	3	2	0	1	80	62	+18	4	Main round
3	Switzerland	3	2	0	1	84	83	+1	4	Intermediate round
4	Austria	3	0	0	3	60	96	−36	0	Intermediate round

Source: EHF
Rules for classification: 1) points; 2) head-to-head points; 3) head-to-head goal difference; 4) head-to-head number of goals scored; 5) goal difference.
(H) Hosts
Notes:

5 August 2021; 18:00	Denmark	18–25	Montenegro	Verde Complex, Podgorica; Attendance: 250; Referees: Budzák, Záhradník (SVK)
5 August 2021; 18:00	Thestrup 4	(12–12)	Pavićević 6	Verde Complex, Podgorica; Attendance: 250; Referees: Budzák, Záhradník (SVK)
5 August 2021; 18:00	5× (suspension)	Report	8× (suspension)	Verde Complex, Podgorica; Attendance: 250; Referees: Budzák, Záhradník (SVK)

5 August 2021; 20:00	Austria	24–35	Switzerland	Verde Complex, Podgorica; Attendance: 30; Referees: Hannes, Hannes (GER)
5 August 2021; 20:00	Sabatnig 7	(11–17)	Albrecht 10	Verde Complex, Podgorica; Attendance: 30; Referees: Hannes, Hannes (GER)
5 August 2021; 20:00	6× (suspension)	Report	5× (suspension)	Verde Complex, Podgorica; Attendance: 30; Referees: Hannes, Hannes (GER)

6 August 2021; 18:00	Montenegro	32–21	Austria	Verde Complex, Podgorica; Attendance: 120; Referees: Rauchs, Linster (LUX)
6 August 2021; 18:00	Pavićević 6	(15–10)	Weber 5	Verde Complex, Podgorica; Attendance: 120; Referees: Rauchs, Linster (LUX)
6 August 2021; 18:00	1× (yellow card) 3× (suspension)	Report	3× (suspension)	Verde Complex, Podgorica; Attendance: 120; Referees: Rauchs, Linster (LUX)

6 August 2021; 20:00	Switzerland	22–33	Denmark	Verde Complex, Podgorica; Attendance: 80; Referees: Geraets, Geraets (NED)
6 August 2021; 20:00	Zaetta 7	(9–14)	Scaglione 5	Verde Complex, Podgorica; Attendance: 80; Referees: Geraets, Geraets (NED)
6 August 2021; 20:00	1× (yellow card) 3× (suspension)	Report	1× (suspension)	Verde Complex, Podgorica; Attendance: 80; Referees: Geraets, Geraets (NED)

8 August 2021; 18:00	Montenegro	26–27	Switzerland	Verde Complex, Podgorica; Attendance: 200; Referees: Simone, Monitillo (ITA)
8 August 2021; 18:00	Vukčević 6	(12–15)	Emmenegger 9	Verde Complex, Podgorica; Attendance: 200; Referees: Simone, Monitillo (ITA)
8 August 2021; 18:00	5× (suspension)	Report	1× (yellow card) 4× (suspension)	Verde Complex, Podgorica; Attendance: 200; Referees: Simone, Monitillo (ITA)

8 August 2021; 20:00	Denmark	29–15	Austria	Verde Complex, Podgorica; Attendance: 70; Referees: Nabokau, Kulik (BLR)
8 August 2021; 20:00	three players 4	(16–8)	Polanszky, Weber 3	Verde Complex, Podgorica; Attendance: 70; Referees: Nabokau, Kulik (BLR)
8 August 2021; 20:00	1× (yellow card) 3× (suspension)	Report	1× (yellow card) 1× (suspension)	Verde Complex, Podgorica; Attendance: 70; Referees: Nabokau, Kulik (BLR)

=== Group B ===
Pos	Team	Pld	W	D	L	GF	GA	GD	Pts	Qualification
1	Russia	3	3	0	0	106	74	+32	6	Main round
2	Croatia	3	2	0	1	88	89	−1	4	Main round
3	Sweden	3	1	0	2	76	85	−9	2	Intermediate round
4	Slovenia	3	0	0	3	66	88	−22	0	Intermediate round

Source: EHF
Rules for classification: 1) points; 2) head-to-head points; 3) head-to-head goal difference; 4) head-to-head number of goals scored; 5) goal difference.

5 August 2021; 13:45	Sweden	21–18	Slovenia	Verde Complex, Podgorica; Attendance: 50; Referees: Xhema, Xhema (KOS)
5 August 2021; 13:45	Mihailovic 6	(12–7)	Černigoj 5	Verde Complex, Podgorica; Attendance: 50; Referees: Xhema, Xhema (KOS)
5 August 2021; 13:45	2× (suspension)	Report	1× (yellow card) 4× (suspension)	Verde Complex, Podgorica; Attendance: 50; Referees: Xhema, Xhema (KOS)

5 August 2021; 15:45	Russia	37–23	Croatia	Verde Complex, Podgorica; Attendance: 60; Referees: Simone, Monitillo (ITA)
5 August 2021; 15:45	Reshetnikova 6	(15–10)	Vuković 6	Verde Complex, Podgorica; Attendance: 60; Referees: Simone, Monitillo (ITA)
5 August 2021; 15:45	4× (suspension)	Report	9× (suspension)	Verde Complex, Podgorica; Attendance: 60; Referees: Simone, Monitillo (ITA)

6 August 2021; 14:00	Croatia	33–27	Sweden	Verde Complex, Podgorica; Attendance: 100; Referees: Nabokau, Kulik (BLR)
6 August 2021; 14:00	Bule 10	(17–15)	Karlsson 8	Verde Complex, Podgorica; Attendance: 100; Referees: Nabokau, Kulik (BLR)
6 August 2021; 14:00	2× (yellow card) 4× (suspension)	Report	1× (yellow card) 1× (suspension)	Verde Complex, Podgorica; Attendance: 100; Referees: Nabokau, Kulik (BLR)

6 August 2021; 16:00	Slovenia	23–25	Russia	Verde Complex, Podgorica; Referees: Hannes, Hannes (GER)
6 August 2021; 16:00	Černigoj 8	(11–20)	Isakova 7	Verde Complex, Podgorica; Referees: Hannes, Hannes (GER)
6 August 2021; 16:00	6× (suspension)	Report	1× (yellow card) 3× (suspension)	Verde Complex, Podgorica; Referees: Hannes, Hannes (GER)

8 August 2021; 14:00	Sweden	28–34	Russia	Verde Complex, Podgorica; Attendance: 50; Referees: Budzák, Záhradník (SVK)
8 August 2021; 14:00	three players 4	(11–16)	Reshetnikova 10	Verde Complex, Podgorica; Attendance: 50; Referees: Budzák, Záhradník (SVK)
8 August 2021; 14:00	2× (yellow card) 7× (suspension)	Report	4× (suspension)	Verde Complex, Podgorica; Attendance: 50; Referees: Budzák, Záhradník (SVK)

8 August 2021; 16:00	Slovenia	25–32	Croatia	Verde Complex, Podgorica; Attendance: 200; Referees: Sekulić, Jovandić (SRB)
8 August 2021; 16:00	Zulić 9	(11–18)	Vuković 9	Verde Complex, Podgorica; Attendance: 200; Referees: Sekulić, Jovandić (SRB)
8 August 2021; 16:00	4× (suspension)	Report	1× (yellow card) 6× (suspension)	Verde Complex, Podgorica; Attendance: 200; Referees: Sekulić, Jovandić (SRB)

=== Group C ===
Pos	Team	Pld	W	D	L	GF	GA	GD	Pts	Qualification
1	Hungary	3	3	0	0	108	50	+58	6	Main round
2	Norway	3	2	0	1	80	67	+13	4	Main round
3	Portugal	3	0	1	2	70	95	−25	1 (Note: Slovakia 23–23 Portugal)	Intermediate round
4	Slovakia	3	0	1	2	51	97	−46	1	Intermediate round

Source: EHF
Rules for classification: 1) points; 2) head-to-head points; 3) head-to-head goal difference; 4) head-to-head number of goals scored; 5) goal difference.
Notes:

5 August 2021; 18:00	Hungary	40–13	Slovakia	Bemax Arena, Podgorica; Attendance: 100; Referees: Nabokau, Kulik (BLR)
5 August 2021; 18:00	three players 6	(20–6)	four players 2	Bemax Arena, Podgorica; Attendance: 100; Referees: Nabokau, Kulik (BLR)
5 August 2021; 18:00	1× (yellow card) 2× (suspension)	Report	2× (suspension)	Bemax Arena, Podgorica; Attendance: 100; Referees: Nabokau, Kulik (BLR)

5 August 2021; 20:00	Norway	31–25	Portugal	Bemax Arena, Podgorica; Attendance: 75; Referees: Geraets, Geraets (NED)
5 August 2021; 20:00	Helland-Døvle 6	(17–14)	Figueiredo 5	Bemax Arena, Podgorica; Attendance: 75; Referees: Geraets, Geraets (NED)
5 August 2021; 20:00	3× (suspension)	Report	5× (suspension)	Bemax Arena, Podgorica; Attendance: 75; Referees: Geraets, Geraets (NED)

6 August 2021; 18:00	Portugal	22–41	Hungary	Bemax Arena, Podgorica; Attendance: 120; Referees: Sekulić, Jovandić (SRB)
6 August 2021; 18:00	Silva 7	(10–20)	Csernyánszki, Simon 6	Bemax Arena, Podgorica; Attendance: 120; Referees: Sekulić, Jovandić (SRB)
6 August 2021; 18:00	5× (suspension)	Report	7× (suspension)	Bemax Arena, Podgorica; Attendance: 120; Referees: Sekulić, Jovandić (SRB)

6 August 2021; 20:00	Slovakia	15–34	Norway	Bemax Arena, Podgorica; Attendance: 100; Referees: Ershov, Pavliukov (RUS)
6 August 2021; 20:00	Mészáros 6	(6–15)	Jullumstrø 7	Bemax Arena, Podgorica; Attendance: 100; Referees: Ershov, Pavliukov (RUS)
6 August 2021; 20:00	8× (suspension) 1× (red card)	Report	5× (suspension)	Bemax Arena, Podgorica; Attendance: 100; Referees: Ershov, Pavliukov (RUS)

8 August 2021; 18:00	Hungary	27–15	Norway	Bemax Arena, Podgorica; Attendance: 150; Referees: Rauchs, Linster (LUX)
8 August 2021; 18:00	Bucsi 6	(15–8)	Enger 3	Bemax Arena, Podgorica; Attendance: 150; Referees: Rauchs, Linster (LUX)
8 August 2021; 18:00	3× (suspension)	Report	2× (suspension)	Bemax Arena, Podgorica; Attendance: 150; Referees: Rauchs, Linster (LUX)

8 August 2021; 20:00	Slovakia	23–23	Portugal	Bemax Arena, Podgorica; Attendance: 85; Referees: Ivanović, Vujisić (MNE)
8 August 2021; 20:00	Bačenková 9	(11–13)	Gonçalves 5	Bemax Arena, Podgorica; Attendance: 85; Referees: Ivanović, Vujisić (MNE)
8 August 2021; 20:00	9× (suspension)	Report	1× (yellow card) 6× (suspension)	Bemax Arena, Podgorica; Attendance: 85; Referees: Ivanović, Vujisić (MNE)

=== Group D ===
Pos	Team	Pld	W	D	L	GF	GA	GD	Pts	Qualification
1	Romania	3	3	0	0	91	77	+14	6	Main round
2	Germany	3	2	0	1	97	81	+16	4	Main round
3	France	3	1	0	2	90	84	+6	2	Intermediate round
4	Czech Republic	3	0	0	3	78	114	−36	0	Intermediate round

Source: EHF
Rules for classification: 1) points; 2) head-to-head points; 3) head-to-head goal difference; 4) head-to-head number of goals scored; 5) goal difference.

5 August 2021; 14:00	France	26–28	Romania	Bemax Arena, Podgorica; Attendance: 100; Referees: Ershov, Pavliukov (RUS)
5 August 2021; 14:00	Borg 7	(14–12)	Boiciuc 12	Bemax Arena, Podgorica; Attendance: 100; Referees: Ershov, Pavliukov (RUS)
5 August 2021; 14:00	1× (yellow card) 5× (suspension)	Report	3× (suspension)	Bemax Arena, Podgorica; Attendance: 100; Referees: Ershov, Pavliukov (RUS)

5 August 2021; 16:00	Germany	40–28	Czech Republic	Bemax Arena, Podgorica; Attendance: 80; Referees: Rauchs, Linster (LUX)
5 August 2021; 16:00	Kühne, Leuchter 9	(21–12)	Gabrhelová 8	Bemax Arena, Podgorica; Attendance: 80; Referees: Rauchs, Linster (LUX)
5 August 2021; 16:00	1× (yellow card) 6× (suspension)	Report	3× (suspension)	Bemax Arena, Podgorica; Attendance: 80; Referees: Rauchs, Linster (LUX)

6 August 2021; 14:00	Czech Republic	23–38	France	Bemax Arena, Podgorica; Attendance: 100; Referees: Ivanović, Vujisić (MNE)
6 August 2021; 14:00	Kapusniaková 4	(8–19)	Pourchez 5	Bemax Arena, Podgorica; Attendance: 100; Referees: Ivanović, Vujisić (MNE)
6 August 2021; 14:00	1× (yellow card) 6× (suspension)	Report	5× (suspension)	Bemax Arena, Podgorica; Attendance: 100; Referees: Ivanović, Vujisić (MNE)

6 August 2021; 16:00	Romania	27–24	Germany	Bemax Arena, Podgorica; Attendance: 200; Referees: Simone, Monitillo (ITA)
6 August 2021; 16:00	Lixăndroiu 9	(12–8)	three players 5	Bemax Arena, Podgorica; Attendance: 200; Referees: Simone, Monitillo (ITA)
6 August 2021; 16:00	2× (yellow card) 4× (suspension)	Report	1× (yellow card) 11× (suspension) 1× (red card)	Bemax Arena, Podgorica; Attendance: 200; Referees: Simone, Monitillo (ITA)

8 August 2021; 14:00	France	26–33	Germany	Bemax Arena, Podgorica; Attendance: 100; Referees: Xhema, Jahja (KOS)
8 August 2021; 14:00	Borg 7	(9–15)	Kühne 13	Bemax Arena, Podgorica; Attendance: 100; Referees: Xhema, Jahja (KOS)
8 August 2021; 14:00	2× (suspension)	Report	2× (yellow card) 7× (suspension)	Bemax Arena, Podgorica; Attendance: 100; Referees: Xhema, Jahja (KOS)

8 August 2021; 16:00	Romania	36–27	Czech Republic	Bemax Arena, Podgorica; Attendance: 95; Referees: Geraets, Geraets (NED)
8 August 2021; 16:00	Boiciuc, Raicea 6	(24–12)	Schreibmeierová 7	Bemax Arena, Podgorica; Attendance: 95; Referees: Geraets, Geraets (NED)
8 August 2021; 16:00	1× (yellow card) 1× (suspension)	Report	5× (suspension)	Bemax Arena, Podgorica; Attendance: 95; Referees: Geraets, Geraets (NED)

== Intermediate round ==
=== Group III ===
Pos	Team	Pld	W	D	L	GF	GA	GD	Pts	Qualification
1	Switzerland	3	3	0	0	97	81	+16	6	9–12th place semifinals
2	Sweden	3	2	0	1	77	71	+6	4	9–12th place semifinals
3	Slovenia	3	1	0	2	73	66	+7	2	13–16th place semifinals
4	Austria	3	0	0	3	60	89	−29	0	13–16th place semifinals

Source: EHF
Rules for classification: 1) points; 2) head-to-head points; 3) head-to-head goal difference; 4) head-to-head number of goals scored; 5) goal difference.

10 August 2021; 14:00	Austria	17–28	Slovenia	Verde Complex, Podgorica; Attendance: 50; Referees: Budzák, Záhradník (SVK)
10 August 2021; 14:00	Sabatnig 5	(10–13)	Černigoj 10	Verde Complex, Podgorica; Attendance: 50; Referees: Budzák, Záhradník (SVK)
10 August 2021; 14:00	1× (yellow card) 7× (suspension)	Report	7× (suspension)	Verde Complex, Podgorica; Attendance: 50; Referees: Budzák, Záhradník (SVK)

10 August 2021; 16:00	Switzerland	34–30	Sweden	Verde Complex, Podgorica; Attendance: 100; Referees: Sekulić, Jovandić (SRB)
10 August 2021; 16:00	Emmenegger 14	(19–13)	Lönnegren, Mihailovic 6	Verde Complex, Podgorica; Attendance: 100; Referees: Sekulić, Jovandić (SRB)
10 August 2021; 16:00	3× (suspension)	Report	2× (suspension)	Verde Complex, Podgorica; Attendance: 100; Referees: Sekulić, Jovandić (SRB)

11 August 2021; 14:00	Slovenia	27–28	Switzerland	Verde Complex, Podgorica; Attendance: 50; Referees: Xhema, Jahja (KOS)
11 August 2021; 14:00	Černigoj 13	(15–13)	Emmenegger 9	Verde Complex, Podgorica; Attendance: 50; Referees: Xhema, Jahja (KOS)
11 August 2021; 14:00	3× (yellow card) 3× (suspension)	Report	3× (suspension)	Verde Complex, Podgorica; Attendance: 50; Referees: Xhema, Jahja (KOS)

11 August 2021; 16:00	Sweden	26–19	Austria	Verde Complex, Podgorica; Attendance: 50; Referees: Ershov, Pavliukov (RUS)
11 August 2021; 16:00	Mihailovic 8	(13–8)	Polanszky 5	Verde Complex, Podgorica; Attendance: 50; Referees: Ershov, Pavliukov (RUS)
11 August 2021; 16:00	1× (yellow card) 1× (suspension)	Report	6× (suspension)	Verde Complex, Podgorica; Attendance: 50; Referees: Ershov, Pavliukov (RUS)

=== Group IV ===
Pos	Team	Pld	W	D	L	GF	GA	GD	Pts	Qualification
1	Portugal	3	2	1	0	78	74	+4	5	9–12th place semifinals
2	France	3	2	0	1	94	67	+27	4	9–12th place semifinals
3	Slovakia	3	1	1	1	63	75	−12	3	13–16th place semifinals
4	Czech Republic	3	0	0	3	70	89	−19	0	13–16th place semifinals

Source: EHF
Rules for classification: 1) points; 2) head-to-head points; 3) head-to-head goal difference; 4) head-to-head number of goals scored; 5) goal difference.

10 August 2021; 14:00	Slovakia	23–21	Czech Republic	Bemax Arena, Podgorica; Attendance: 50; Referees: Xhema, Jahja (KOS)
10 August 2021; 14:00	Šalátová 5	(12–10)	Gabrhelová, Řádová 4	Bemax Arena, Podgorica; Attendance: 50; Referees: Xhema, Jahja (KOS)
10 August 2021; 14:00	1× (yellow card) 3× (suspension)	Report	6× (suspension)	Bemax Arena, Podgorica; Attendance: 50; Referees: Xhema, Jahja (KOS)

10 August 2021; 16:00	Portugal	27–25	France	Bemax Arena, Podgorica; Attendance: 100; Referees: Ershov, Pavliukov (RUS)
10 August 2021; 16:00	Rebelo 10	(14–9)	Pintat 8	Bemax Arena, Podgorica; Attendance: 100; Referees: Ershov, Pavliukov (RUS)
10 August 2021; 16:00	3× (suspension)	Report	1× (yellow card) 4× (suspension)	Bemax Arena, Podgorica; Attendance: 100; Referees: Ershov, Pavliukov (RUS)

11 August 2021; 14:00	Czech Republic	26–28	Portugal	Bemax Arena, Podgorica; Attendance: 50; Referees: Hannes, Hannes (GER)
11 August 2021; 14:00	Gabrhelová 5	(16–16)	Ferreira 6	Bemax Arena, Podgorica; Attendance: 50; Referees: Hannes, Hannes (GER)
11 August 2021; 14:00	5× (suspension)	Report	1× (yellow card) 3× (suspension)	Bemax Arena, Podgorica; Attendance: 50; Referees: Hannes, Hannes (GER)

11 August 2021; 16:00	France	31–17	Slovakia	Bemax Arena, Podgorica; Attendance: 150; Referees: Ivanović, Vujisić (MNE)
11 August 2021; 16:00	Tuccella 6	(18–9)	Hornyák, Mészáros 4	Bemax Arena, Podgorica; Attendance: 150; Referees: Ivanović, Vujisić (MNE)
11 August 2021; 16:00	4× (suspension)	Report	1× (yellow card) 3× (suspension)	Bemax Arena, Podgorica; Attendance: 150; Referees: Ivanović, Vujisić (MNE)

== Main round ==
=== Group I ===
Pos	Team	Pld	W	D	L	GF	GA	GD	Pts	Qualification
1	Russia	3	3	0	0	106	68	+38	6	Semifinals
2	Denmark	3	1	0	2	82	81	+1	2 (Note: Denmark 2 Pts, +6 GD; Montenegro 2 Pts, +4 GD; Croatia 2 Pts, –10 GD)	Semifinals
3	Montenegro (H)	3	1	0	2	61	76	−15	2	5–8th place semifinals
4	Croatia	3	1	0	2	68	92	−24	2	5–8th place semifinals

Source: EHF
Rules for classification: 1) points; 2) head-to-head points; 3) head-to-head goal difference; 4) head-to-head number of goals scored; 5) goal difference.
(H) Hosts
Notes:

10 August 2021; 18:00	Montenegro	16–35	Russia	Verde Complex, Podgorica; Attendance: 250; Referees: Hannes, Hannes (GER)
10 August 2021; 18:00	three players 3	(6–13)	Sokova 5	Verde Complex, Podgorica; Attendance: 250; Referees: Hannes, Hannes (GER)
10 August 2021; 18:00	1× (yellow card) 6× (suspension)	Report	1× (suspension)	Verde Complex, Podgorica; Attendance: 250; Referees: Hannes, Hannes (GER)

10 August 2021; 20:00	Denmark	35–22	Croatia	Verde Complex, Podgorica; Attendance: 75; Referees: Rauchs, Linster (LUX)
10 August 2021; 20:00	Scaglione 14	(18–12)	Vuković 6	Verde Complex, Podgorica; Attendance: 75; Referees: Rauchs, Linster (LUX)
10 August 2021; 20:00	2× (suspension)	Report	8× (suspension)	Verde Complex, Podgorica; Attendance: 75; Referees: Rauchs, Linster (LUX)

11 August 2021; 18:00	Croatia	23–20	Montenegro	Verde Complex, Podgorica; Attendance: 200; Referees: Nabokau, Kulik (BLR)
11 August 2021; 18:00	Vuković 9	(12–11)	Vukčević 7	Verde Complex, Podgorica; Attendance: 200; Referees: Nabokau, Kulik (BLR)
11 August 2021; 18:00	1× (yellow card) 5× (suspension)	Report	1× (yellow card) 3× (suspension)	Verde Complex, Podgorica; Attendance: 200; Referees: Nabokau, Kulik (BLR)

11 August 2021; 20:00	Russia	34–29	Denmark	Verde Complex, Podgorica; Attendance: 50; Referees: Geraets, Geraets (NED)
11 August 2021; 20:00	Reshetnikova 9	(15–15)	Scaglione 9	Verde Complex, Podgorica; Attendance: 50; Referees: Geraets, Geraets (NED)
11 August 2021; 20:00	1× (suspension)	Report	5× (suspension)	Verde Complex, Podgorica; Attendance: 50; Referees: Geraets, Geraets (NED)

=== Group II ===
Pos	Team	Pld	W	D	L	GF	GA	GD	Pts	Qualification
1	Hungary	3	3	0	0	85	56	+29	6	Semifinals
2	Germany	3	1	0	2	75	79	−4	2 (Note: Germany 2 Pts, +3 GD; Romania 2 Pts, +2 GD; Norway 2 Pts, –5 GD)	Semifinals
3	Romania	3	1	0	2	72	80	−8	2	5–8th place semifinals
4	Norway	3	1	0	2	65	82	−17	2	5–8th place semifinals

Source: EHF
Rules for classification: 1) points; 2) head-to-head points; 3) head-to-head goal difference; 4) head-to-head number of goals scored; 5) goal difference.
Notes:

10 August 2021; 18:00	Norway	21–27	Germany	Bemax Arena, Podgorica; Attendance: 50; Referees: Simone, Monitillo (ITA)
10 August 2021; 18:00	Fikstvedt, Jullumstrø 4	(9–11)	Leuchter 8	Bemax Arena, Podgorica; Attendance: 50; Referees: Simone, Monitillo (ITA)
10 August 2021; 18:00	4× (suspension)	Report	1× (yellow card) 3× (suspension)	Bemax Arena, Podgorica; Attendance: 50; Referees: Simone, Monitillo (ITA)

10 August 2021; 20:00	Hungary	27–17	Romania	Bemax Arena, Podgorica; Attendance: 80; Referees: Ivanović, Vujisić (MNE)
10 August 2021; 20:00	Bucsi 5	(11–10)	Boiciuc, Lixăndroiu 5	Bemax Arena, Podgorica; Attendance: 80; Referees: Ivanović, Vujisić (MNE)
10 August 2021; 20:00	1× (yellow card) 5× (suspension)	Report	1× (yellow card) 5× (suspension)	Bemax Arena, Podgorica; Attendance: 80; Referees: Ivanović, Vujisić (MNE)

11 August 2021; 18:00	Germany	24–31	Hungary	Bemax Arena, Podgorica; Attendance: 90; Referees: Sekulić, Jovandić (SRB)
11 August 2021; 18:00	Leuchter 8	(11–16)	Csernyánszki, Simon 6	Bemax Arena, Podgorica; Attendance: 90; Referees: Sekulić, Jovandić (SRB)
11 August 2021; 18:00	2× (yellow card) 3× (suspension)	Report	1× (yellow card) 1× (suspension)	Bemax Arena, Podgorica; Attendance: 90; Referees: Sekulić, Jovandić (SRB)

11 August 2021; 20:00	Romania	28–29	Norway	Bemax Arena, Podgorica; Attendance: 110; Referees: Budzák, Záhradník (SVK)
11 August 2021; 20:00	Mihai 10	(14–13)	Fikstvedt 6	Bemax Arena, Podgorica; Attendance: 110; Referees: Budzák, Záhradník (SVK)
11 August 2021; 20:00	2× (suspension)	Report	5× (suspension)	Bemax Arena, Podgorica; Attendance: 110; Referees: Budzák, Záhradník (SVK)

== Final round ==
=== Bracket ===
Championship bracket

Semifinals
13 August
Russia	32
Germany (ET)	34
13 August
Hungary	33
Denmark	25

Final
15 August
Germany	19
Hungary	25
Third place
15 August
Russia	37
Denmark	30

Ninth place bracket

9–12th place semifinals
13 August
Switzerland	35
France	28
13 August
Portugal	26
Sweden	22

Ninth place
14 August
Switzerland	39
Portugal	30
Eleventh place
14 August
France	31
Sweden	29

Fifth place bracket

5–8th place semifinals
13 August
Montenegro	17
Norway	33
13 August
Romania	23
Croatia	27

Fifth place
15 August
Norway	21
Croatia	33
Seventh place
15 August
Montenegro	24
Romania	30

13th place bracket

13–16th place semifinals
13 August
Slovenia	23
Czech Republic	28
13 August
Slovakia	20
Austria	32

13th place
14 August
Czech Republic	22
Austria	19
15th place
14 August
Slovenia	23
Slovakia	33

=== 13–16th place semifinals ===
13 August 2021; 13:00	Slovenia	23–28	Czech Republic	Bemax Arena, Podgorica; Attendance: 30; Referees: Xhema, Jahja (KOS)
13 August 2021; 13:00	Udovč, Zulić 5	(11–15)	Kapusniaková, Skácelová 5	Bemax Arena, Podgorica; Attendance: 30; Referees: Xhema, Jahja (KOS)
13 August 2021; 13:00	1× (yellow card) 5× (suspension)	Report	1× (yellow card) 4× (suspension)	Bemax Arena, Podgorica; Attendance: 30; Referees: Xhema, Jahja (KOS)

13 August 2021; 15:30	Slovakia	20–32	Austria	Bemax Arena, Podgorica; Attendance: 30; Referees: Ershov, Pavliukov (RUS)
13 August 2021; 15:30	Kužmová, Walterová 4	(11–16)	Sabatnig 12	Bemax Arena, Podgorica; Attendance: 30; Referees: Ershov, Pavliukov (RUS)
13 August 2021; 15:30	1× (yellow card) 5× (suspension)	Report	4× (suspension)	Bemax Arena, Podgorica; Attendance: 30; Referees: Ershov, Pavliukov (RUS)

=== 9–12th place semifinals ===
13 August 2021; 18:00	Switzerland	35–28	France	Bemax Arena, Podgorica; Attendance: 33; Referees: Geraets, Geraets (NED)
13 August 2021; 18:00	Coker 10	(17–15)	Pintat 6	Bemax Arena, Podgorica; Attendance: 33; Referees: Geraets, Geraets (NED)
13 August 2021; 18:00	4× (suspension)	Report	3× (suspension)	Bemax Arena, Podgorica; Attendance: 33; Referees: Geraets, Geraets (NED)

13 August 2021; 20:30	Portugal	26–22	Sweden	Bemax Arena, Podgorica; Attendance: 50; Referees: Nabokau, Kulik (BLR)
13 August 2021; 20:30	Jesus 6	(15–9)	Lönnegren 4	Bemax Arena, Podgorica; Attendance: 50; Referees: Nabokau, Kulik (BLR)
13 August 2021; 20:30	1× (yellow card) 3× (suspension)	Report	1× (yellow card) 1× (suspension)	Bemax Arena, Podgorica; Attendance: 50; Referees: Nabokau, Kulik (BLR)

=== 5–8th place semifinals ===
13 August 2021; 13:00	Montenegro	17–33	Norway	Verde Complex, Podgorica; Attendance: 100; Referees: Rauchs, Linster (LUX)
13 August 2021; 13:00	Vukčević 5	(6–16)	Fremo, Jullumstrø 5	Verde Complex, Podgorica; Attendance: 100; Referees: Rauchs, Linster (LUX)
13 August 2021; 13:00	6× (suspension)	Report	1× (suspension)	Verde Complex, Podgorica; Attendance: 100; Referees: Rauchs, Linster (LUX)

13 August 2021; 15:30	Romania	23–27	Croatia	Verde Complex, Podgorica; Attendance: 100; Referees: Hannes, Hannes (GER)
13 August 2021; 15:30	Lixăndroiu, Mihai 5	(18–12)	Bule 8	Verde Complex, Podgorica; Attendance: 100; Referees: Hannes, Hannes (GER)
13 August 2021; 15:30	3× (suspension)	Report	1× (yellow card) 4× (suspension)	Verde Complex, Podgorica; Attendance: 100; Referees: Hannes, Hannes (GER)

=== Semifinals ===
13 August 2021
18:00
Russia
32–34 (ET)
Germany
Verde Complex, Podgorica
Attendance: 100
Referees: Budzák, Záhradník (SVK)
Reshetnikova 13
(18–14)
Leuchter 12
1× (yellow card) 4× (suspension)
Report
1× (yellow card) 6× (suspension)

FT: 30–30 ET: 2–4

13 August 2021; 20:30	Hungary	33–25	Denmark	Verde Complex, Podgorica; Attendance: 150; Referees: Simone, Monitillo (ITA)
13 August 2021; 20:30	Csíkos, Simon 5	(19–16)	Scaglione 14	Verde Complex, Podgorica; Attendance: 150; Referees: Simone, Monitillo (ITA)
13 August 2021; 20:30	3× (suspension)	Report	2× (suspension)	Verde Complex, Podgorica; Attendance: 150; Referees: Simone, Monitillo (ITA)

=== 15th place game ===
14 August 2021; 10:00	Slovenia	23–33	Slovakia	Bemax Arena, Podgorica; Attendance: 30; Referees: Geraets, Geraets (NED)
14 August 2021; 10:00	four players 4	(10–18)	Brnová 8	Bemax Arena, Podgorica; Attendance: 30; Referees: Geraets, Geraets (NED)
14 August 2021; 10:00	4× (suspension)	Report	2× (suspension)	Bemax Arena, Podgorica; Attendance: 30; Referees: Geraets, Geraets (NED)

=== 13th place game ===
14 August 2021; 12:30	Czech Republic	22–19	Austria	Bemax Arena, Podgorica; Attendance: 50; Referees: Nabokau, Kulik (BLR)
14 August 2021; 12:30	Kubálková 4	(10–8)	Weber 6	Bemax Arena, Podgorica; Attendance: 50; Referees: Nabokau, Kulik (BLR)
14 August 2021; 12:30	1× (yellow card) 1× (suspension)	Report	1× (suspension)	Bemax Arena, Podgorica; Attendance: 50; Referees: Nabokau, Kulik (BLR)

=== Eleventh place game ===
14 August 2021; 15:00	France	31–29	Sweden	Bemax Arena, Podgorica; Attendance: 68; Referees: Ershov, Pavliukov (RUS)
14 August 2021; 15:00	Pintat 6	(15–18)	Salmi 5	Bemax Arena, Podgorica; Attendance: 68; Referees: Ershov, Pavliukov (RUS)
14 August 2021; 15:00	1× (suspension)	Report	4× (suspension)	Bemax Arena, Podgorica; Attendance: 68; Referees: Ershov, Pavliukov (RUS)

=== Ninth place game ===
14 August 2021; 17:30	Switzerland	39–30	Portugal	Bemax Arena, Podgorica; Attendance: 50; Referees: Ivanović, Vujisić (MNE)
14 August 2021; 17:30	Emmenegger 8	(21–15)	Rebelo 12	Bemax Arena, Podgorica; Attendance: 50; Referees: Ivanović, Vujisić (MNE)
14 August 2021; 17:30	1× (yellow card) 1× (suspension)	Report	2× (suspension)	Bemax Arena, Podgorica; Attendance: 50; Referees: Ivanović, Vujisić (MNE)

=== Seventh place game ===
15 August 2021; 10:00	Montenegro	24–30	Romania	Verde Complex, Podgorica; Attendance: 200; Referees: Rauchs, Linster (LUX)
15 August 2021; 10:00	Ražnatović 6	(11–15)	Boiciuc 8	Verde Complex, Podgorica; Attendance: 200; Referees: Rauchs, Linster (LUX)
15 August 2021; 10:00	5× (suspension)	Report	6× (suspension)	Verde Complex, Podgorica; Attendance: 200; Referees: Rauchs, Linster (LUX)

=== Fifth place game ===
15 August 2021; 12:30	Norway	21–33	Croatia	Verde Complex, Podgorica; Attendance: 100; Referees: Ivanović, Vujisić (MNE)
15 August 2021; 12:30	Rekdal 5	(10–18)	Bule 8	Verde Complex, Podgorica; Attendance: 100; Referees: Ivanović, Vujisić (MNE)
15 August 2021; 12:30	4× (suspension)	Report	1× (yellow card) 1× (suspension)	Verde Complex, Podgorica; Attendance: 100; Referees: Ivanović, Vujisić (MNE)

=== Third place game ===
15 August 2021; 15:00	Russia	37–30	Denmark	Verde Complex, Podgorica; Attendance: 301; Referees: Geraets, Geraets (NED)
15 August 2021; 15:00	Semina 11	(17–16)	Rasmussen 6	Verde Complex, Podgorica; Attendance: 301; Referees: Geraets, Geraets (NED)
15 August 2021; 15:00	4× (suspension)	Report	4× (suspension)	Verde Complex, Podgorica; Attendance: 301; Referees: Geraets, Geraets (NED)

=== Final ===
15 August 2021; 17:30	Germany	19–25	Hungary	Verde Complex, Podgorica; Attendance: 545; Referees: Sekulić, Jovandić (SRB)
15 August 2021; 17:30	Kühne 6	(10–12)	Csernyánszki, Farkas 5	Verde Complex, Podgorica; Attendance: 545; Referees: Sekulić, Jovandić (SRB)
15 August 2021; 17:30	4× (suspension)	Report	3× (suspension)	Verde Complex, Podgorica; Attendance: 545; Referees: Sekulić, Jovandić (SRB)

== Final ranking ==
Qualified for the 2022 Women's Youth World Handball Championship
Relegated to the Women’s 17 EHF Championship 2023

Rank	Team
1st place, gold medalist(s)	Hungary
2nd place, silver medalist(s)	Germany
3rd place, bronze medalist(s)	Russia
4	Denmark
5	Croatia
6	Norway
7	Romania
8	Montenegro
9	Switzerland
10	Portugal
11	France
12	Sweden
13	Czech Republic
14	Austria
15	Slovakia
16	Slovenia

== Tournament awards ==
The all-star team and awards were announced on 15 August 2021.

=== All-star team ===
Position	Player
Goalkeeper	(Hungary) Klára Zaj
Right wing	(Switzerland) Mia Emmenegger
Right back	(Germany) Viola Leuchter
Centre back	(Russia) Alina Reshetnikova
Left back	(Denmark) Julie Scaglione
Left wing	(Croatia) Katja Vuković
Pivot	(Hungary) Kata Juhász

=== Awards ===
Most valuable player	(Hungary) Júlia Farkas
Best defender	(Russia) Daria Lavrenteva
Top scorer	(Germany) Viola Leuchter
