= 2010–11 Damehåndboldligaen =

Damehåndboldligaen
- Season: 2010–11
- Champions: FC Midtjylland
- Relegated: SønderjyskE, Roskilde
- Champions League: Midtjylland, Randers HK, Viborg HK
- EHF Cup: Esbjerg, Vejen, TTH
- Cup Winners' Cup: Viborg HK, Randers HK
- Matches: 132

The 2010–11 Damehåndboldligaen was the 75th season of the Damehåndboldligaen, Denmark's premier Handball league. Randers HK won the regular season, while FC Midtjylland won the Championship, beating Randers in the final after a penalty shootout.

SønderjyskE was relegated after finishing last in the regular season. Roskilde Håndbold were relegated after they lost the relegation play-off to Silkeborg-Voel KFUM.

== Team information ==
The following 12 clubs compete in the Damehåndboldligaen during the 2010–11 season:

Team	Location	Arena	Capacity
Team Esbjerg	Esbjerg	Blue Water Dokken	2,549
HC Odense	Odense	Odense Idrætshal	2,300
Aalborg DH	Aalborg	Gigantium	1,300
Midtjylland	Ikast	Ikast-Brande Arena	2,550
Frederiksberg IF	Frederiksberg	Frederiksberghallen	1,469
Randers HK	Randers	Arena Randers	3,000
Roskilde Håndbold	Roskilde	Roskilde Hallerne	1,000
KIF Vejen	Vejen	Vejen Idrætscenter	
SK Aarhus	Aarhus	Vejlby-Risskov Hallen	1,152
SønderjyskE	Aabenraa	Aabenraa Idrætscenter	1,480
TTH	Holstebro	Gråkjær Arena	3,250
Viborg HK	Viborg	Viborg Stadionhal	3,000

== Regular season ==
=== Standings ===
Pos	Team	Pld	W	D	L	GF	GA	GD	Pts	Qualification or relegation
1	Randers	22	20	0	2	671	492	+179	40	Championship Round
2	Viborg HK	22	18	0	4	665	554	+111	36	Championship Round
3	Midtjylland	22	14	2	6	574	494	+80	30	Championship Round
4	KIF Vejen	22	14	1	7	579	512	+67	29	Championship Round
5	Esbjerg	22	12	1	9	618	579	+39	25	Championship Round
6	Tvis Holstebro	22	11	1	10	609	577	+32	23	Championship Round
7	SK Aarhus	22	9	1	12	580	582	−2	19	Relegation Round
8	Frederiksberg IF	22	8	2	12	515	520	−5	18	Relegation Round
9	Aalborg DH	22	7	2	13	560	620	−60	16	Relegation Round
10	HC Odense	22	8	1	13	464	548	−84	17	Relegation Round
11	Roskilde Håndbold	22	4	1	17	537	675	−138	9	Relegation Round
12	SønderjyskE	22	1	0	21	510	729	−219	2	Relegation

Source: Flashscore

== Championship playoffs ==
The top 6 teams from the regular season competed in two groups of three. The winner advances to the final. The second place advances to the third-place playoff. The first and second placed teams where awarded 1 point in each of their groups.

=== Pot 1 ===
Pos	Team	Pld	W	D	L	GF	GA	GD	Pts	Qualification
1	Randers HK (Note: including 1 bonus point)	4	3	1	0	118	95	+23	8	Finals
2	TTH	4	1	1	2	106	115	−9	3	Third-place playoff
3	Vejen	4	1	0	3	101	115	−14	2	

=== Pot 2 ===
Pos	Team	Pld	W	D	L	GF	GA	GD	Pts	Qualification
1	Midtjylland	4	3	0	1	117	101	+16	6	Finals
2	Viborg HK (Note: including 1 bonus point)	4	2	0	2	102	113	−11	5	Third-place playoff
3	Esbjerg	4	1	0	3	106	111	−5	2	

=== Bronze match ===
Dates		Home team in the 1st match	Home team in the 2nd match	Results		
1st match	2nd match	Home team in the 1st match	Home team in the 2nd match	Aggregate	1st match	2nd match
18/5	23/5	Viborg HK	TTH	68–58	36-28	32–30

=== Final ===
Dates			Home team in the 1st match	Home team in the 2nd match	Results		
1st match	2nd match	3rd match	Home team in the 1st match	Home team in the 2nd match	1st match	2nd match	3rd match
20/5	22/5	28/5	Randers HK	FC Midtjylland	23-20	19–23	26–27
