= Mia Emmenegger =

Swiss handball player (born 2005)

Personal information
- Full name: Mia Emmenegger
- Nationality: Swiss
- Born: 17 January 2005 (age 21) Wolhusen, Switzerland
- Height: 1.60 m (5 ft 3 in)

Sport
- Sport: Handball
- Position: Right wing
- Current club: Team Esbjerg
- Number: 38

Senior clubs
- Years: Team
- 2021–2024: Spono Eagles
- 2024–01/2025: Vipers Kristiansand
- 01/2025–: Team Esbjerg
National team
Years	Team	Apps	(Gls)
2021–	Switzerland	60	(275)

Mia Emmenegger (born 17 January 2005) is a Swiss female handball player for Team Esbjerg and the Swiss national team.

== International ==
Emmenegger made her official debut on the Swiss national team on 6 October 2021, against Russia. She represented Switzerland for the first time at the 2022 European Women's Handball Championship in Slovenia, Montenegro and North Macedonia, where she scored 17 goals in 3 matches. This was the first time Switzerland played at a major international tournament, and they were eliminated in the preliminary rounds.

She was also a part of the national team for the EC that Switzerland co-host with Austria and Hungary in 2024.

== Club ==
On 12 March 2024 it was announced that Emmenegger had signed a two-years contract with Vipers Kristiansand. She left less than a year later, when the club went bankrupt in January 2025. She then joined Danish side Team Esbjerg. In her first season in Denmark, Esbjerg reached the final of the 2024-25 Danish Championship, but lost to Odense Håndbold. A year after she won the Danish Championship, when they beat Odense in three matches.

== Achievements ==
- SPAR Premium League
  - Bronze Medalist: 2022
- EHF Champions League
  - Bronze Medalist: 2024-25
- Danish Championship:
  - Winner: 2026
  - Silver Medalist: 2025

Individual awards

- EHF Excellence Awards Rookie of the season: 2024/25
