= 2001–02 Håndboldligaen (men's handball) =

Danish Handball League
- Season: 2001–02
- Champions: KIF Kolding 8th title
- Relegated: IBH Ikast, Kolding Håndboldklub
- EHF Champions League: KIF Kolding
- EHF Cup: Bjerringbro FH
- EHF Cup Winners' Cup: GOG Håndbold
- EHF Challenge Cup: Aarhus GF, Aalborg HSH
- Matches: 188
- Goals: 10,064 (53.53 per match)
- Top goalscorer: (Denmark) Heins Kart Pedersen (172 goals)
- Total attendance: 143,007
- Average attendance: 1,037

The 2001–02 Danish Handball League season was the 66th edition of the Danish Handball League. KIF Kolding were the defending champions.

KIF Kolding won the title for a second year in a row, when they beat Bjerringbro FH in the finals. KIF Kolding also won the regular season. IBH Ikast and Kolding Håndboldklub were relegated.

== League table ==
The regular season was a double round robin. The 4 best teams qualified for the championship playoff, while the 2 last-placed teams were relegated. The 12th and 11th place met in a relegation play-off. The rest qualified for the next season. The loser of the relegation play-off played the winner of the 1st Division in a play-off, where the winner was promoted to the 2002-03 Håndboldligaen.

=== Regular season ===
	Team	P	W	D	L	G+	G−	Pts
1	KIF Kolding	26	23	1	2	778	648	47
2	GOG Håndbold	26	18	1	7	759	686	37
3	Bjerringbro FH	26	16	3	7	709	642	35
4	Virum-Sorgenfri HK	26	14	3	9	728	736	31
5	Skjern Håndbold	26	14	2	10	708	648	30
6	Aalborg HSH	26	14	2	10	661	633	30
7	Team Tvis Holstebro	26	11	2	13	643	638	24
8	Aarhus GF	26	10	3	13	684	685	23
9	FCK Håndbold	26	11	1	14	660	631	23
10	Ajax Farum	26	11	1	14	677	700	23
11	Viborg HK	26	10	1	15	679	744	21
12	Elite 3000	26	7	4	15	680	710	18
13	IBH Ikast	26	5	1	20	591	727	11
14	Kolding Håndboldklub	26	5	1	20	694	835	11

Champion Playoff
Relegation Playoff
Relegation

=== Championship Round ===
The championship round was played with two semifinals; one between the 1st and 4th placed and one between the 2nd and 3rd placed teams.

== Semifinals ==
Teams	Result
KIF Kolding – Virum-Sorgenfri	32–29
Virum-Sorgenfri – KIF Kolding	28–33

Teams	Result
GOG – Bjerringbro FH	28–32
Bjerringbro FH – GOG	27–25
GOG – Skjern Håndbold	31–32

=== Finals ===
Teams	Result
KIF Kolding – Bjerringbro FH	28–32
Bjerringbro FH – KIF Kolding	27–32
KIF Kolding – Bjerringbro FH	31–29

== Top scorers ==
Topscorers - regular season
#	Name	Team	Goals	Matches
1	Heins Kart Pedersen	Bjerringbro FH	172	26
2	Lars Rasmussen	Virum-Sorgenfri HK	171	26
3	Bilal Šuman	KIF Kolding	163	25
4	Kasper Jørgensen	Virum-Sorgenfri HK	152	26
5	Jesper Jensen	Skjern Håndbold	151	26
6	Christian Back	Aalborg HSH	150	25
7	Lasse Andersen	Team Tvis Holstebro	148	25
8	John Kristensen	FIF	146	26
9	Kristian Gjessing	Skjern Håndbold	142	25
10	Klavs Bruun Jørgensen	GOG	140	26
source: dhf.dk
