= Astrid Lynnerup =

Danish handball player (born 2001)

Personal information
- Full name: Astrid Willer Lynnerup
- Nationality: Danish
- Born: 25 September 2001 (age 25) Bjerringbro, Denmark
- Height: 1.75 m (5 ft 9 in)

Sport
- Sport: Handball
- Position: Left wing
- Current club: Skanderborg Håndbold
- Number: 25

Youth career
- Years: Team
- 2006-2017: Bjerringbro FH
- 2017-2020: Randers HK

Senior clubs
- Years: Team
- 2018-2020: Randers HK
- 2020-2022: Bjerringbro FH
- 2022-2024: EH Aalborg
- 2024-2026: Skanderborg Håndbold
- 2026-: Ikast Håndbold

Astrid Willer Lynnerup (born 25 September 2001) is a Danish handball player for Skanderborg Håndbold in the Danish Women's Handball League.

== Career ==
She started playing handball at the age of 4 at Bjerringbro FH along with her twin sister Iben Lynnerup, who is also a semi-professional handball player. In there youth years, the sisters where coached by their own father, Christian Lynnerup until the age of 12. In 2017 the sisters transferred to Randers HK to join the youth team. In December 2017, she made her first appearance on the senior team and friendly match against TTH Holstebro. Later, she became a permanent part of the league squad until she moved back to Bjerringbro FH in 2022, helping the team promoting to the Damehåndboldligaen.

On 20 April 2022, it was announced she joined EH Aalborg and extended her contract the following year. In Skanderborg Håndbold she had great success, and in January 2026 she was the third highest scoring player in the league with 65 goals in 10 matches.

On 6 January 2026, Lynnerup was presented as a new player for top tier Ikast Håndbold for the 2026–27 season.
