= 2024–25 Kvindeligaen =

Kvindeligaen
- Season: 2024–25
- Dates: 30 August 2024-12 June 2025
- Champions: Odense Håndbold
- Relegated: Aarhus Håndbold
- Champions League: Odense Håndbold, Team Esbjerg
- EHF European League: NFH, Viborg HK, HH Elite
- Matches: 182
- Top goalscorer: (Switzerland) Tabea Schmid (287 goals)
- Longest winning run: Odense 31
- Longest unbeaten run: Odense 31

The 2024–25 Kvindeligaen was the 89th season of Kvindeligaen, Denmark's premier women's handball league. Team Esbjerg were the defending champions, while EH Aalborg was promoted from the 1. division.

Odense Håndbold won the regular season in perfect fashion, winning 26 of 26 games. Later they won the title, when they beat Team Esbjerg in the final 2-1 in matches. Aarhus Håndbold were relegated to the 1st Division after finishing last in the regular season.

== Team information ==
Locations of the 2024–25 Damehåndboldligaen

Team.	Town	Arena	Capacity
Aarhus Håndbold	Aarhus	Ceres Arena Stadionhal	1.200
EH Aalborg	Aalborg	Nørresundby Idrætscenter	800
HH Elite	Horsens	Forum Horsens	4,000
Ikast Håndbold	Ikast	IBF Arena	2,850
København Håndbold	København	Frederiksberghallen	1,468
Nykøbing Falster Håndboldklub	Nykøbing Falster	Spar Nord Arena	1,300
Odense Håndbold	Odense	Sydbank Arena	2,256
Bjerringbro FH	Bjerringbro	Bjerringbro Idrætscenter	800
Silkeborg-Voel KFUM	Silkeborg	Jysk Arena	3,000
Skanderborg Håndbold	Skanderborg	Skanderborg Fælled	1,700
Team Esbjerg	Esbjerg	Blue Water Dokken	2,549
SønderjyskE	Aabenraa	Arena Aabenraa	1,400
Ringkøbing Håndbold	Ringkøbing	Green Sports Arena	1,200
Viborg HK	Viborg	BioCirc Arena	3,000

=== Personnel and kits ===
Team	Sporting director	Coach	Kit producer
Silkeborg-Voel KFUM	Jakob Andreasen	(Denmark) Peter Schilling Laursen	Adidas
Ikast Håndbold	Daniel Grønhøj	(Denmark) Søren Reinholt Hansen	Select
HH Elite	Jørgen Møller	(Denmark) Claus Mogensen	Hummel
Aarhus Håndbold	Peter Bredsdorff-Larsen	(Denmark) Jeppe Vestergaard	
København Håndbold	Louise Svalastog	(Denmark) Bo Spellerberg	Hummel
Nykøbing Falster Håndboldklub	Kenneth Sahlholdt	(Greenland) Jakob Larsen	Puma
Ringkøbing Håndbold	Michelle Brandstrup	(Denmark) Jesper Holmris	Hummel
EH Aalborg	Anita Vivi Lilholt	(Denmark) Peter Jagd	Adidas
Bjerringbro FH	Dennis Jensen	(Denmark) Jesper Bangshøi	Adidas
Skanderborg Håndbold	Jens Christensen	(Denmark) Kim Johansen	Puma
Odense Håndbold	Lasse Honoré	(Norway) Ole Gustav Gjekstad	Craft Sportswear
SønderjyskE Håndbold	Henrik Jepsen	(Denmark) Peter Nielsen	Hummel
Viborg HK	Jens Steffensen	(Denmark) Ole Bitsch	PUMA
Team Esbjerg	Hans Christian Warrer	(Sweden) Tomas Axnér	Hummel

== Regular season ==
=== Standings ===
Pos	Team	Pld	W	D	L	GF	GA	GD	Pts	Qualification or relegation
1	Odense Håndbold	26	26	0	0	910	647	+263	52	Championship play-offs + advance to Champions League
2	Team Esbjerg	26	22	1	3	891	685	+206	45	Championship play-offs
3	Ikast Håndbold	26	22	1	3	845	697	+148	45	Championship play-offs
4	Nykøbing Falster	26	16	1	9	784	762	+22	33	Championship play-offs
5	København Håndbold	26	16	0	10	835	811	+24	32	Championship play-offs
6	Viborg HK	26	16	0	10	776	755	+21	32	Championship play-offs
7	SønderjyskE	26	11	3	12	744	749	−5	25	Championship play-offs
8	HH Elite	26	8	3	15	679	752	−73	19	Championship play-offs
9	Ringkøbing Håndbold	26	7	2	17	725	789	−64	16	
10	Silkeborg-Voel KFUM	26	7	2	17	721	791	−70	16	
11	Bjerringbro FH	26	5	3	18	661	807	−146	13	
12	EH Aalborg	26	5	2	19	729	849	−120	12	
13	Skanderborg Håndbold	26	5	2	19	709	828	−119	12	
14	Aarhus Håndbold	26	5	2	19	703	790	−87	12	Relegation to 1. division

Rules for classification: 1.) Points in head-to-head matches amongst tied teams; 2.) Goal difference in head-to-head matches amongst tied teams; 3.) Goals scored in head-to-head matches among tied teams; 4.) Points in all matches; 5.) Goal difference in all matches.

== Playoffs ==
=== Pot 1 ===
Pos	Team	Pld	W	D	L	GF	GA	GD	Pts	Qualification
1	Odense Håndbold (Note: Including 2 bonus points)	6	5	0	1	192	165	+27	12	Semi final
2	København Håndbold	6	3	0	3	179	193	−14	6	Semi final
3	HH Elite	6	3	0	3	176	183	−7	6	
4	Nykøbing Falster Håndboldklub (Note: including 1 bonus point)	6	1	0	5	179	185	−6	3	

=== Pot 2 ===
Pos	Team	Pld	W	D	L	GF	GA	GD	Pts	Qualification
1	Team Esbjerg (Note: Including 2 bonus points)	6	4	1	1	196	174	+22	11	Semi final
2	Ikast Håndbold (Note: Including 1 bonus point)	6	5	0	1	189	169	+20	11	Semi final
3	SønderjyskE Håndbold	6	2	0	4	165	191	−26	4	
4	Viborg HK	6	0	1	5	175	191	−16	1	

=== Playoff ===
==== Semi final ====
Date		Home team - Match 1	Home team - Match 2	Result	
1st match	2nd match	Home team - Match 1	Home team - Match 2	1st match	2nd match
20.05	24.05	Odense Håndbold	Ikast Håndbold	27-27	32-38
20.05	24.05	Team Esbjerg	København Håndbold	34-27	37-36

- The match is decided in best of 3. If the result is even after 2 matches, a third match is played.

==== Third place playoff ====
Date		Home team - Match 1 IBF Arena	Home team - Match 2 Frederiksberghallen	Result	
1st match	2nd match	Home team - Match 1 IBF Arena	Home team - Match 2 Frederiksberghallen	1st match	2nd match
05.06	08.06	Ikast Håndbold	København Håndbold	38-21	30-25

- The match is decided in best of 3. If the result is even after 2 matches, a third match is played.

=== Final ===
Date			Home team - Match 1 and 3 Sydbank Arena	Home team - Match 2 Blue Water Dokken	Result		
1st match	2nd match	3rd match	Home team - Match 1 and 3 Sydbank Arena	Home team - Match 2 Blue Water Dokken	1st match	2nd match	3rd match
05.06	08.06	12.06	Odense Håndbold	Team Esbjerg	31-38	33-28	33-31

- The match is decided in best of 3. If the result is even after 2 matches, a third match is played.

=== Relegation table ===
Pos	Team	Pld	W	D	L	GF	GA	GD	Pts	Qualification
1	Silkeborg-Voel KFUM	4	4	0	0	130	113	+17	10	
2	EH Aalborg	4	3	0	1	135	127	+8	7	
3	Bjerringbro FH	4	1	1	2	114	116	−2	4	
4	Ringkøbing Håndbold	4	0	1	3	117	125	−8	3	
5	Skanderborg Håndbold	4	0	2	2	117	132	−15	2	Relegation playoff

== Statistics ==
=== Topscorers ===
==== Regular season ====
Rank	Name	Club	Goals
1	(Switzerland) Tabea Schmid	København Håndbold	205
2	(Denmark) Mai Kragballe	HH Elite	194
3	(Norway) Henny Reistad	Team Esbjerg	180
4	(Sweden) Melissa Petrén	SønderjyskE	160
5	(Sweden) Clara Lerby	EH Aalborg	155
6	(Denmark) Line Gyldenløve	Bjerringbro FH	154
7	(Norway) Stine Skogrand	Ikast Håndbold	152
8	(Denmark) Line Berggren Larsen	Aarhus Håndbold	149
9	(Denmark) Christina Pedersen	Viborg HK	148
10	(Denmark) Helene Kindberg	København Håndbold	139

==== Total ====
Rank	Name	Club	Goals
1	(Switzerland) Tabea Schmid	København Håndbold	287
2	(Denmark) Mai Kragballe	HH Elite	243
3	(Norway) Henny Reistad	Team Esbjerg	237
4	(Sweden) Melissa Petrén	SønderjyskE	201
5	(Norway) Stine Skogrand	Ikast Håndbold	185
6	(Denmark) Helene Kindberg	København Håndbold	184
7	(Sweden) Clara Lerby	EH Aalborg	182
8	(Denmark) Michala Møller	Team Esbjerg	176
9	(Denmark) Line Gyldenløve	Bjerringbro FH	169
10	(Denmark) Christina Pedersen	Viborg HK	164

=== All star team ===
The team of the season was released on 16 April 2025.

==== Regular season ====
Position	Name	Club
Goalkeeper	(Denmark) Anna Kristensen	Team Esbjerg
Right wing	(Norway) Maja Magnussen	Nykøbing Falster
Right back	(Denmark) Helene Kindberg	København Håndbold
Centre back	(Norway) Henny Reistad	Team Esbjerg
Left back	(Denmark) Line Berggren Larsen	Aarhus Håndbold
Left wing	(Sweden) Clara Lerby	EH Aalborg
Pivot	(Switzerland) Tabea Schmid	København Håndbold

==== Coach of the season ====
(Norway) Ole Gustav Gjekstad - Odense Håndbold
