= Mikael Fruelund =

Danish handball player (born 1980)

Personal information
- Full name: Mikael Fruelund
- Nationality: Danish (Denmark)
- Born: 27 February 1980 (age 46)
- Height: 187 cm (74 in)

Sport
- Sport: Handball
- Position: Right back

Senior clubs
- Years: Team
- -2001: Bjerringbro FH
- 2001-2003: Viborg HK
- 2003-2004: GOG Håndbold
- 2004-2005: Viborg HK
- 2005-2006: BM Altea
- 2006-2008: Nordsjælland Håndbold
- 2008-?: Ajax Heroes
- ?-2011: Frederiksberg IF

Mikael Fruelund (born 27 February 1980) is a Danish former handballer. He has previously played for rival league clubs Bjerringbro FH, Viborg HK and GOG Svendborg. He also had a spell at Spanish league side BM Altea.

During his youth career, Fruelund made several appearances for the Danish national youth handball teams.

He is the younger brother of former Danish women international Katrine Fruelund. His cousin is handball coach Martin Albertsen.

== Career ==
He played until 2001 for Bjerringbro FH, where he joined Viborg HK. In 2003 he joined GOG for a single season, before returning to Viborg.

He then joined Spanish side BM Altea for a single season, before he returned to Denmark and joined Nordsjælland Håndbold in the 1st Division. In 2008 he joined Ajax Heroes on a two-year deal. The club had just been promoted to the Herrehåndboldligaen and looked to strengthen the team. He then joined Frederiksberg IF, before retiring in 2011.

== Post-playing career ==
After his handball career, he was worked in banking.
