= Katrine Fruelund =

Danish handball player (born 1978)

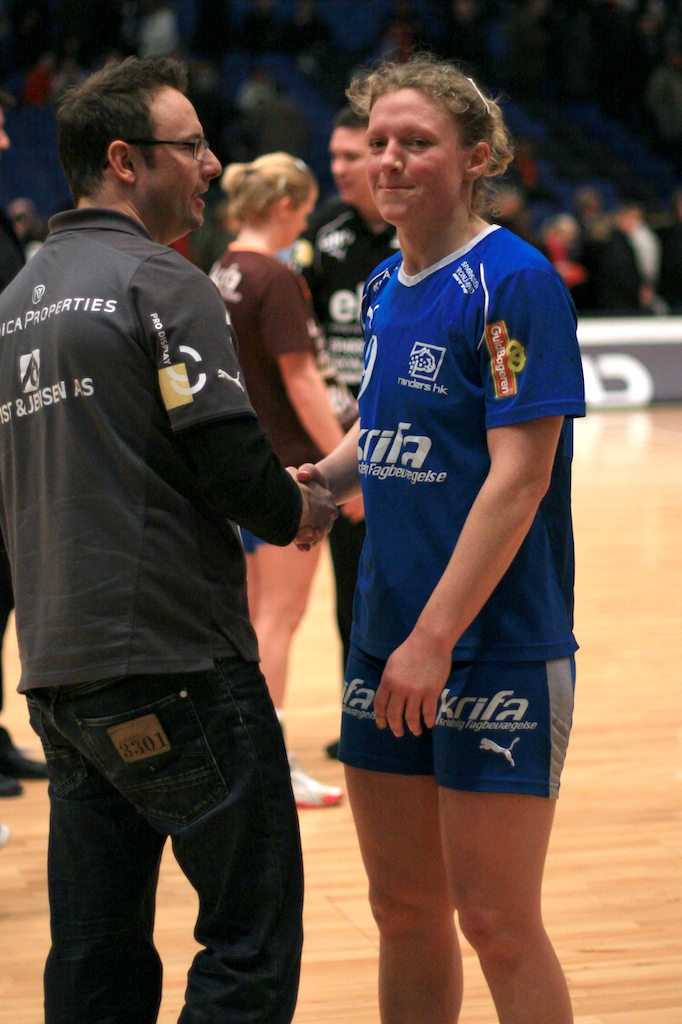

Personal information
- Full name: Katrine Fruelund
- Nationality: Danish
- Born: 12 July 1978 (age 48) Randers, Denmark
- Height: 1.74 m (5 ft 9 in)

Sport
- Sport: Handball
- Position: Left Back
- Current club: Retired

Senior clubs
- Years: Team
- –1999: Randers HK
- 1999–2005: Viborg HK
- 2005–2006: HC Leipzig
- 2006–2012: Randers HK
- 2013–2014: Randers HK
National team
Years	Team	Apps	(Gls)
1997–2012	Denmark	184	(570)
Medal record
Women's handball
Representing Denmark
Olympic Games
Gold medal – first place	2000 Sydney	Team
Gold medal – first place	2004 Athens	Team
European Championship
Gold medal – first place	2002 Denmark	Team
Silver medal – second place	1998 Netherlands	Team
- Updated on 3 June 2012

Katrine Fruelund (born 12 July 1978) is a Danish former team handball player and politician. She is two times Olympic champion, winning gold medals with the Danish national team in 2000 and 2004.

After her active career she has taken part in local politics in Randers.

== Personal life ==
Fruelund was born in Randers on 12 July 1978. Her younger brother, Mikael Fruelund, is also a former professional handball player. Her cousin Martin Albertsen is a handball coach, and was her coach at HC Leipzig.

== Sports career ==
She received gold medals with the Danish national team at the 2000 Summer Olympics in Sydney and at the 2004 Summer Olympics in Athens. She stopped playing for the Danish national team in 2008, but unretired for a single match in 2012. She ended her playing career in 2014.

During her career she was one of the dominant players on the Danish National Team, especially at the 2004 Olympics, where she was player of the match and top scorer in the final against South Korea. She has played the fifth most matches on the Danish national team of all time.

== Post-playing career ==
After her playing career, she continued to be involved with handball as a talent scout for her childhood club Randers HK. In 2020 she became the assistant trainer for the Danish U-19 national team, and a year later for the Danish U-17 national team.

=== Political career ===
In 2013 Katrine Fruelund was elected to the Randers Municipality Council representing the centre-right party Venstre. At the 2017 Danish local elections, she received the third most votes in Randers Municipality.

In 2018 she announced that she intended to run for the European Parliament for Venstre at the 2019 European Parliament election. However early in 2019 she withdrew her candidacy, citing the desire to spend time with her family as the reason. She did however continue as a politician in the Randers Local Council until the 2021 Danish local elections.

== Achievements ==
=== Club ===
- Damehåndboldligaen:
  - Winner: 2000, 2001, 2002, 2004, 2012
  - Silver Medalist: 2010, 2011
- Landspokalturneringen:
  - Winner: 2003
- Bundesliga:
  - Winner: 2006
- DHB-Pokal:
  - Winner: 2006
- EHF Cup:
  - Winner: 2004, 2010
- EHF Champions League:
  - Finalist: 2001

=== International ===
- Olympic Games:
  - Winner: 2000, 2004
- European Championship:
  - Winner: 2002
  - Silver Medalist: 1998
