= Martin Albertsen =

Danish handball coach (born 1974)

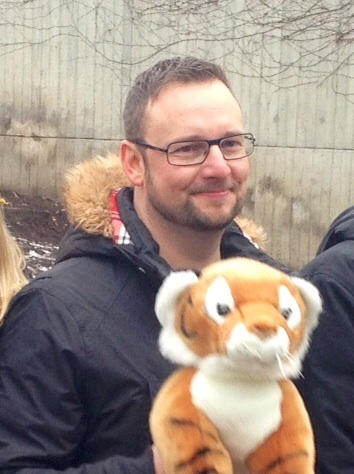
- Albertsen in 2013

Personal information
- Nationality: Danish
- Born: 10 April 1974 (age 52)
- Height: 1.80 m (5 ft 11 in)

Sport
- Sport: Handball
- Current club: Bjerringbro FH

Teams managed
- Years: Team
- 1989–1998: Vorup FB
- 1998–1999: AGF Håndbold
- 2001–2004: Viborg HK
- 2004–2006: HC Leipzig
- 2006–2008: Randers HK
- 2011–2013: Viborg HK
- 2013–2014: København Håndbold
- 2014–2019: SG BBM Bietigheim
- 2018–2023: Switzerland women
- 2022–: Switzerland women junior
- 2023: Ferencváros
- 2025–: Bjerringbro FH

Martin Albertsen (born 10 April 1974) is a Danish handball coach, who is currently coaching Bjerringbro FH.

== Career ==
Between 2018 and 2023 he was the head coach of the Switzerland women's national handball team. He qualified the Swiss team for their first international competition at the 2022 European Women's Handball Championship in North Macedonia, Slovenia and Montenegro. Despite the qualification, they were eliminated in the preliminary round.

In 2002 and 2004 he won the Danish Women's Handball League with Viborg HK, as his first professional coaching job. Albertsen also won the Handball-Bundesliga Frauen in 2006 and with SG BBM Bietigheim in 2017 and 2019. He also qualified the Bietigheim team for the 2016–17 Women's EHF Cup final.

In 2025 he became the head coach of Bjerringbro FH.

== Private ==
He is the cousin of handball players Katrine Fruelund and Mikael Fruelund.
