= Viola Leuchter =

German handball player (born 2004)

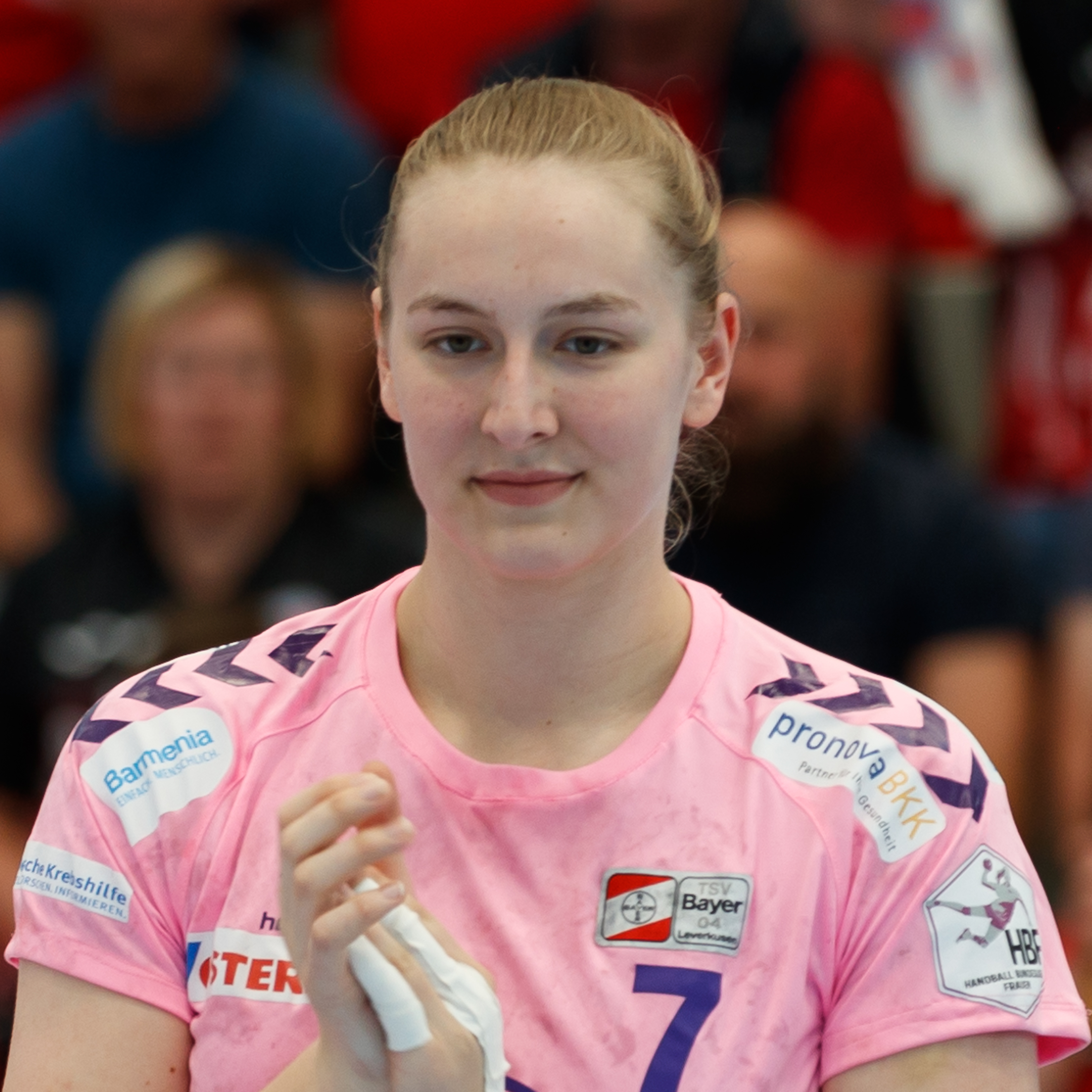
- Leuchter in 2023

Personal information
- Nationality: German
- Born: 15 June 2004 (age 22) Hamburg, Germany
- Height: 1.85 m (6 ft 1 in)

Sport
- Sport: Handball
- Position: Right back
- Current club: Odense Håndbold
- Number: 7

Senior clubs
- Years: Team
- 2018–2019: BTB Aachen
- 2019–2024: Bayer Leverkusen
- 2024–2025: HB Ludwigsburg
- 2025–: Odense Håndbold
National team
Years	Team	Apps	(Gls)
2023–	Germany	39	(94)
Medal record
World Championship
Silver medal – second place	2025 Netherlands/Germany
Youth European Championship
Silver medal – second place	2021 Montenegro
- Updated on 7 November 2025

Viola Leuchter (born 15 July 2004) is a German handball player for Odense Håndbold and the German national team.

Leuchter made her international debut on the German national team on 3 March 2023 against Hungary. Later that year, she represented Germany at the 2023 World Women's Handball Championship in Denmark/Sweden/Norway. At the same occasion, Leuchter was elected as the best young player of the tournament.

Two years later she represented Germany at the 2025 World Women's Handball Championship. Here Germany reached the final, where they lost to Norway. This was the first time since 1994 that Germany made the final of a major international tournament and the first time they won a medal since 2007. Despite the loss Leuchter was the MVP of the final and was named best young player of the tournament. She was named the 2025 IHF Young female player of the year.

== Individual awards ==
- 2025 IHF Young female player of the year.
- Best Young Player of the IHF World Handball Championship: 2023, 2025
- Topscorer of the Youth European Championship: 2021 (55 goals)
- All-Star Right back of the Youth European Championship: 2021
