= Julie Scaglione =

Danish handball player (born 2004)

Personal information
- Full name: Julie Mathiesen Scaglione
- Nationality: Danish
- Born: 20 August 2004 (age 22) Ry, Denmark
- Height: 1.80 m (5 ft 11 in)

Sport
- Sport: Handball
- Position: Left back
- Current club: Team Esbjerg
- Number: 4

Youth career
- Years: Team
- –: Ry Håndbold
- 2018–2020: Skanderborg Håndbold

Senior clubs
- Years: Team
- 2020–2026: Ikast Håndbold
- 2026–: Team Esbjerg
National team
Years	Team	Apps	(Gls)
2022–	Denmark	32	(99)
Medal record
World Championship
Bronze medal – third place	2023 Denmark/Norway/Sweden
Youth World Championships
Silver medal – second place	2022 North Macedonia
- Updated on 25 October 2026

Julie Mathiesen Scaglione (born 20 August 2004) is a Danish handball player who plays for Team Esbjerg in the Damehåndboldligaen and the Danish national team.

== Club career ==
Scaglione started playing handball at her local club Ry Håndbold, followed by Skanderborg Håndbold and Ikast Håndbold. She made her senior debut on 21 February 2021 in an EHF Cup match against Paris 92. In the Danish League she did however have to wait for her debut match, as she had not even reached the minimum age. She made her league debut on 1 September 2021.

With Ikast she won the 2023 European League.

In January 2024 she suffered an knee cruciate ligament injury in a match against Skanderborg Håndbold, which kept her out for the rest of the 2023/24 season. Despite her injury, she extended her contract at Ikast in October 2024 until 2027. 15 months after her injury she made a comeback in the European League semifinal match against HSG Blomberg-Lippe. She was the top scorer in that match with 5 goals.

In the 2025–26 season, she was the top scorer in the Danish league. The following summer she joined league rivals Team Esbjerg.

== National team ==
She represented Denmark in the 2021 European Women's U-17 Handball Championship, placing 4th. Scaglione was also included in the official All-Star team for tournament, as best left back, and was the second best goalscorer behind Russian Alina Reshetnikova.

She made her debut on the Danish national team on 9 June 2022 against Slovenia. She was also selected as part of the Danish 35-player squad for the 2021 World Women's Handball Championship in Spain. At the 2023 World Championsship she won bronze medals with Denmark. During the tournament she scored 11 goals.

At the 2025 World Women's Handball Championship Denmark went out in the quarterfinal to France after winning all matches in the group stages. The Danish team was affected by a lot of players missing the tournament including goalkeepers Sandra Toft and Althea Reinhardt and pivots Sarah Iversen and Rikke Iversen. This was the first time since 2019 that Denmark left a major international tournament without any medals. Scaglione acted mainly as a back-up during the tournament.

== Private ==
Her mother, Lone Mathiesen, was also a handballer and was part of the 1997 World Women's Handball Championship winning Denmark team. Her father Thomas Scaglione is half Italian and is also a handball player.

Her brother, Mikkel Scaglione, is a handballer for Norddjurs Håndbold in the Danish 1st Division.

== Achievements ==
- Damehåndboldligaen:
  - Bronze Medalist: 2021, 2022
- EHF European League:
  - Winner: 2023
  - Silver Medalist: 2025

== Individual awards ==
- Best left back of the EHF European Under-17 Championship: 2021
- Best left back of the Youth World Championship: 2022
- Danish League top scorer: 2025-26
