= Janni Bach =

Australian handball player (born 1966)

Personal information
- Nationality: Denmark; Australia
- Born: 28 April 1966 (age 60) Copenhagen, Denmark
- Height: 164 cm (65 in)

Sport
- Sport: Handball

Senior clubs
- Years: Team
- ?-?: Roskilde Håndbold
- ?-?: University of Sydney
National team
Years	Team	Apps
?-?	Australia	5
- Updated on only during the 2000 Summer Olympics

Janni Bach (born 28 April 1966) is a Danish-born Australian former handball player who represented Australia in international competitions. Originally from Denmark, Bach later competed for the Australian national team, including at major events such as the 2000 Summer Olympics in Sydney.

== Early life ==
She played handball from the age of five, made her Denmark junior women's national handball team debut at age 17, and was chosen for the Denmark women's national handball team in 1991.

== Personal life ==
In 1997, her husband Peter —also a handball player— was offered a job in Australia, and the family relocated. Within weeks of arriving, both were recruited for the Australia women's national handball team and the Australia men's national handball team, respectively. Bach's son, Rasmus, is a professional basketball player.

== Career ==
Bach was part of the team at the 2000 Summer Olympics, playing five matches. On club level she played for Roskilde Håndbold in Denmark, and University of Sydney in Australia.
