= Emilie Ytting =

Danish handball player (born 1999)

Personal information
- Full name: Emilie Ytting Pedersen
- Nationality: Danish
- Born: 2 August 1999 (age 27) Silkeborg, Denmark
- Height: 1.76 m (5 ft 9 in)

Sport
- Sport: Handball
- Position: Left wing
- Current club: København Håndbold
- Number: 7

Senior clubs
- Years: Team
- 2017–2020: Silkeborg-Voel KFUM
- 2020–2022: Skanderborg Håndbold
- 2022–: København Håndbold
National team
Years	Team	Apps	(Gls)
2025–	Denmark	5	(5)
- Updated on 12 April 2026

Emilie Ytting Pedersen (born 2 August 1999) is a Danish handball player for København Håndbold and the Danish national team.

== Career ==
She started her career at her local club Silkeborg-Voel KFUM. In 2020 she joined Skanderborg Håndbold in search of more playing time. 2 years later she joined København Håndbold on a contract until 2024. In the 2025-26 season she was the league top scorer in the regular season with 181 goals, and the 5th overall with 214.

She made her debut for the Danish national team in March 2025 against Norway.
