= Iva Bule =

Croatian handballer (born 2004)

Personal information
- Nationality: Croatian
- Born: 14 November 2004 (age 22) Dubrovnik, Croatia
- Height: 1.74 m (5 ft 9 in)

Sport
- Sport: Handball
- Position: Left back
- Current club: RK Lokomotiva Zagreb
- Number: 11

Youth career
- Years: Team
- RK Lipanjske zore
- ŽRK Metković

Senior clubs
- Years: Team
- –2020: ŽRK Metković
- 2020–2026: RK Dalmatinka Ploče
- 2026–: RK Lokomotiva Zagreb
National team
Years	Team	Apps	(Gls)
2024–	Croatia	35	(50)
- Updated on 29 October 2026

Iva Bule (born 14 November 2004) is a Croatian handballer for RK Lokomotiva Zagreb and the Croatian national team.

She represented Croatia at the 2024 European Women's Handball Championship.

She comes from Čapljina. Although there was a possibility that she could also play for Bosnia and Herzegovina, she is from the youth days playing for the Croatian team.
