= Jakob Andreasen =

Jakob Andreasen may refer to:

- Jakob Andreasen (handball coach)
- Jakob Andreasen (engineer)
