= Line Gyldenløve =

Danish handball player (born 1987)

Line Gyldenløve Kristensen
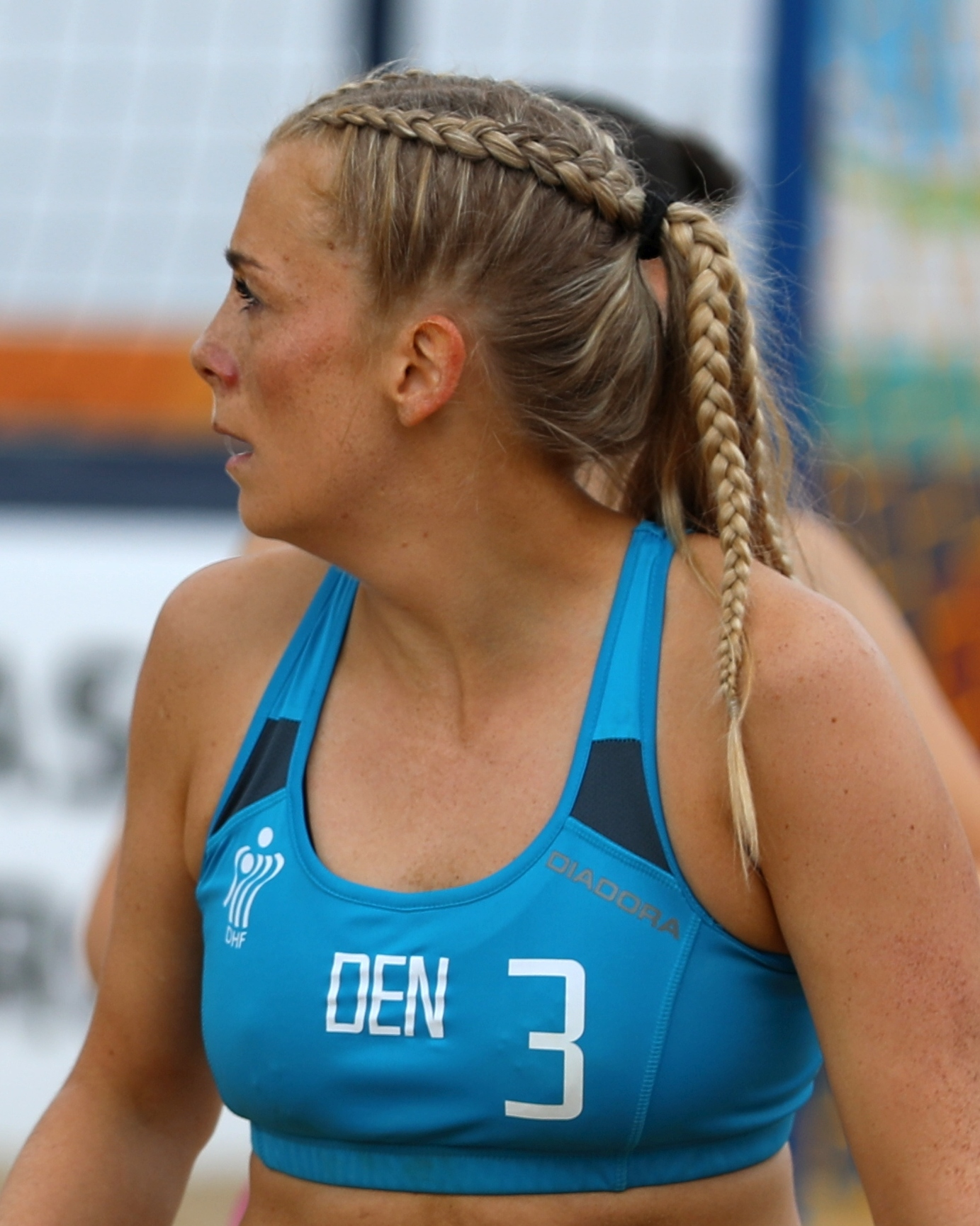
- Line Gyldenløve at the 2019 European Beach Handball Championship

Personal information
- Full name: Line Gyldenløve Kristensen
- Nationality: Danish
- Born: 17 April 1987 (age 39) Bjerringbro, Denmark
- Height: 1.67 m (5 ft 6 in)

Sport
- Sport: Handball
- Position: Centre back
- Current club: Bjerringbro FH
- Number: 7

Youth career
- Years: Team
- 2005-2007: Bjerringbro FH

Senior clubs
- Years: Team
- 2007-: Bjerringbro FH
National team
Years	Team	Apps	(Gls)
2009–	Denmark Beach	122	(1225)
Medal record
Women's beach handball
World Championships
Silver medal – second place	2012 Muscat
European Championship
Gold medal – first place	2019 Stare Jabłonki
Silver medal – second place	2013 Randers
Silver medal – second place	2011 Umag
World Beach Games
Gold medal – first place	2019 Qatar	Team
- Updated on 12 February 2025

Line Gyldenløve Kristensen (born 17 April 1987) is Danish handball player, who plays for Bjerringbro FH in the top Danish division, Damehåndboldligaen. She has played her entire career for the club.

Outside of indoor handball she has also featured on the Danish beach handball national team. In 2019 she won both the World Beach Games in Doha and the European Championship in Stare Jabłonki. She was the first Danish player to reach both 100 games and 1000 points for the Danish beach handball national team.

She has been named the player of the year in the Danish 1st Division twice; in 2018-19 and in 2020–21. In the 2017-18 and 2018–19 seasons she was the top scorer in the Danish 1st division with 163 and 144 goals respectively.

In the 2022-23 she was promoted to the Damehåndboldligaen with Bjerringbro FH for the first time the club's history. In her first season in the Danish top league she was the top scorer with 173 goals. Just after the season she extended her contract at Bjerringbro.

== Outside the court ==
Since 2022 she has been a member on the board of HåndboldSpillerForeningen, the Danish labour union for handball players.
