= Jesse van de Polder =

Dutch handball player (born 1998)

Personal information
- Full name: Jesse van de Polder
- Nationality: Dutch
- Born: 3 July 1998 (age 28) Amsterdam, Netherlands
- Height: 1.71 m (5 ft 7 in)

Sport
- Sport: Handball
- Position: Goalkeeper
- Current club: Holstebro Håndbold
- Number: 1

Senior clubs
- Years: Team
- 2016-2018: Quintus
- 2018-2019: TuS Metzingen
- 2019: TG Nürtingen
- 2020: TuS Metzingen
- 2020-: EH Aalborg

Jesse van de Polder (born 3 July 1998) is a Dutch handball player who plays as goalkeeper for Danish club EH Aalborg.

On 5 May 2020, it was announced that she had signed a 1-year contract with EH Aalborg, from TuS Metzingen.

== Achievements ==
- Bundesliga:
  - Bronze Medalist: 2019
- DHB-Pokal:
  - Bronze Medalist: 2018, 2019
