= Kristian Gjessing =

Danish handball player (born 1978)

Personal information
- Full name: Kristian Gjessing
- Nationality: Danish (Denmark)
- Born: 15 January 1978 (age 48) Aarhus, Denmark
- Height: 1.96 m (6 ft 5 in)

Sport
- Sport: Handball
- Position: Left Back
- Current club: Retired
National team
Years	Team	Apps	(Gls)
1999-2010	Denmark	52	(82)
Medal record
Representing Denmark
Men's Handball
Junior World Championship
Gold medal – first place	1999 Qatar	Team

Kristian Gjessing (born 15 January 1978) is a Danish former handball player. During his career he played for multiple Danish Handball League sides, including AaB Håndbold, HC Midtjylland and Skjern Håndbold. He has also previously played for Spanish side BM Altea.

Gjessing made 52 appearances for the Danish national handball team.

He ended his career in 2017.
