= Roskilde Håndbold =

Danish handball club

- Full name: Roskilde Håndbold
- Arena: Roskilde Hallerne
- Capacity: 1,000
- President: Ib Christoffersen
- Head coach: Daniel Rensch
- League: Danish 1st Division
- 2025-26: 5th (women)
- Club colours
Home	Away

Roskilde Håndbold is a handball club from Roskilde, Denmark. Currently, Roskilde Håndbold competes in the women's Danish 1st Division. The home arena of the club is Roskilde Hallerne.

The club has previously been known as Roar Roskilde.

== History ==
In 1999 the Danish handball star player Anja Andersen made an attempt to buy the women's team, in an attempt to lift a smaller handball team to the top of the game. This did however not go through as Roskilde Municipality did not wish to cooperate. Instead she invested in Slagelse Dream Team.

In the 2000-01 season the men's team played in the top division, but they were relegated in their first season up.

Roskilde Håndbold cooperates with Sport & Craft, which offers, among other things, fat Roskilde Håndbold handball clothing as well as running and handball shoes. Roskilde Håndbold cooperates with Sportyfied and Select in connection with the purchase of balls, sports care products, resins and similar products.

In the 2010-11 season, the team was relegated after losing the playoff to Silkeborg-Voel KFUM.

The club's women play in the 2019/20 season in the 1st division and the 2nd team plays in the 2nd division. The club's men's team plays in the 1st division and the 2nd team plays in the 3rd division.

In the 2020/2021 season, the women's team gained promotion to the Danish top flight Damehåndboldligaen, but were relegated again after only one season.

== Team ==
=== Current squad ===
Squad for the 2025–26 season

Goalkeepers

- 40 (Denmark) Stinne Strøjr Hansen
- 71 (Denmark) Rebekka Grube Larsen

Wingers
LW

- 11 (Denmark) Sara Ibranovic
- 50 (Denmark) Emilie West Zangenberg

RW

- 35 (Denmark) Katrine Broskov Jørgensen
- 36 (Denmark) Julie Gottschalksen

Line players

- 13 (Denmark) Amalie Tolderlund
- 27 (Norway) Maria Kvannli
- 29 (Denmark) Simone Jægergård

Back players
LB

- 25 (Denmark) Kamille Hauge Rasmussen
- 29 (Denmark) Emma Penny Laursen
- 37 (Denmark) Esther Birk Lund
- 38 (Denmark) Amanda Poulsen
- 99 (Denmark) Caroline Gam Brønd Vidø

CB

- 3 (Denmark) Ida Marie Wrang Nielsen
- 8 (Denmark) Sofie Izabel Simonsen

RB

- 2 (Denmark) Astrid Molander
- 6 (Denmark) Caroline Kliver
- 33 (Denmark) Laura Brendstrup

=== Transfers ===
Transfers for the 2026-27 season

Joining

- (Denmark) Henrik Jørgensen (Assistant Coach) (from (Denmark) HØJ)
- (Denmark) Line Haupt Christiansen (GK) (from (Denmark) NFH)
- (Denmark) Freja Sølling Fager (GK) (from youth team)
- (Denmark) Astrid Eising (P) (from (Denmark) Rødovre HK)
- (Denmark) Amanda Foged (P) (from (Denmark) HØJ 2)
- (Denmark) Sabine Adamsen (P) (from youth team)
- (Denmark) Nikoline Høgsland (P) (from (Denmark) Ajax København)

Leaving

- (Denmark) Rebekka Grube Larsen (GK) (to ?)
- (Denmark) Caroline Kliver (RB) (retires)
- (Denmark) Amalie Tolderlund (P) (to ?)
- (Denmark) Astrid Eising (P) (to (Denmark) København Håndbold)

=== Former players ===
- (Denmark) Althea Reinhardt
- (Denmark) Mette Gravholt
- (Denmark) Kristina Kristiansen
- (Denmark) Mia Rej
- (Denmark) Anna Grundtvig
- (Denmark) Cecilie Greve
- (Australia) Janni Bach

== Men's handball team ==
=== Current squad ===
Squad for the 2025–26 season

Goalkeepers
Left Wingers
Right Wingers
Line players

Left Backs
Central Backs

- (Denmark) Oliver Klarskov

Right Backs

==== Transfers ====
Transfers for the 2025–26 season

Joining

- (Denmark) Oliver Klarskov (CB) from (Denmark) Nordsjælland Håndbold

Leaving

- (Denmark) Jacob Bro Sørensen (CB) loan back to (Denmark) Nordsjælland Håndbold

=== Former players ===
- (Denmark) Erik Veje Rasmussen
- (Denmark) Lukas Jørgensen
