= Aarhus Håndbold (women's handball) =

Danish handball club

Aarhus Håndbold Kvinder
- Full name: Aarhus
- Founded: July 1, 2024; 2 years ago
- Arena: Ceres Stadionhal
- Capacity: 1,200
- Head coach: Jeppe Vestergaard
- League: Damehåndboldligaen
- 2024–25: 14th (relegation)
- Club colours
| Home | Away |

Location of Aarhus Håndbold

Aarhus Håndbold Women is a women's handball club based in Aarhus, Denmark. As of the 2024–25 season, the team competes in the Damehåndboldligaen. The club also includes a men's team, competing the Danish 1st Division.

In June 2024, it was announced that Aarhus United and Aarhus HC had decided to merge under the new club name Aarhus Håndbold. When the club was founded, Skanderborg AGF Håndbold decided to sue them, as they used the same club name as one of the founders of Skanderborg AGF, Aarhus Håndbold.

In April 2025, in their first season, the club was relegated from the top level of Damehåndboldligaen to the 1st Division, placing 14th in the final standings. They had the same number of points as Skanderborg Håndbold, but had a worse head-to-head record.

== Arena ==
- Name: Ceres Stadionhal
- Capacity: 1,200
- City: Aarhus, Denmark
- Address: Stadion Allé 70, 8000 Aarhus

== Team ==
=== Current squad ===
Squad for the 2026–27 season

Goalkeepers

- 12 (Denmark) Alberte Hamborg
- 86 (Denmark) Stine Skovbo Almind

Wingers
LW

- 14 (Denmark) Camilla Degn
- 15 (Denmark) Line Edling Lauritsen

RW

- 18 (Denmark) Cecilie Have Nielsen

Pivots

- 3 (Denmark) Kamilla Olsen
- 8 (Denmark) Maria Jacobsen
- 23 (Denmark) Emma Skipper Jensen

Back players
LB

- 2 (Denmark) Emma Gandrup Ernst
- 19 (Denmark) Mathilde Piil
- 33 (Denmark) Freja Gandrup Ernst

CB

- 13 (Denmark) Tilde Nygaard Ulrichsen
- 17 (Norway) Stina Jøsendal Kjeldbjerg
- 72 (Denmark) Line Frandsen
- 73 (Denmark) Karoline Fahlberg

RB

- 11 (Denmark) Agnete Brendholdt
- 31 (Denmark) Caroline Søgaard

=== Technical staff ===
- Head coach: Marie Aamand Sørensen
- Assistant coach: Stine Ege Qwist

=== Transfers ===
Transfers for the season 2026-27

Joining

- (Denmark) Peter Conrad (Head Coach)
- (Denmark) Alberte Hamborg (GK) (from (Denmark) Ringkøbing Håndbold)
- (Denmark) Tilde Nygaard Ulrichsen (CB) (from (Denmark) Skanderborg Håndbold U19)
- (Denmark) Caroline Søgaard (RB) (from (Denmark) Ringkøbing Håndbold)
- (Denmark) Cecilie Have Nielsen (RW) (from (Denmark) Ejstrup/Hærvejen)
- (Denmark) Emma Skipper (P) (from (Denmark) Holstebro Håndbold)
- (Denmark) Kamilla Olsen (P) (from (Denmark) GOG Håndbold)

Leaving

- (Netherlands) Jesse van de Polder (GK) (to (Denmark) Bjerringbro FH)
- (Norway) Line Homdrom Rusten (LW) (to (Romania) CS Minaur Baia Mare)
- (Denmark) Signe Vetter Laursen (LB) (to ?)
- (United States) Emma Ready (CB) (to (Denmark) Bjerringbro FH)
- (Denmark) Anne Hylleberg Svendsen (CB) (to ?)
- (Denmark) Anne Berggreen (RB) (to ?)
- (Denmark) Tania Bilde Knudsen (RW) (to (Denmark) Bjerringbro FH)
- (Denmark) Sara Lilholt (P) (to ?)
- (Denmark) Julie Molbech (P) (to (Sweden) Skuru IK)

== Kit manufacturers ==
- (Sweden) Craft Sportswear

== See also ==
- Aarhus United
- Aarhus Håndbold
- AGF Håndbold
