= Jesper Holmris =

Danish handball coach (born 1970)

Personal information
- Full name: Jesper Holmris Hansen
- Nationality: Danish
- Born: 21 December 1970 (age 55) Aarhus, Denmark

Sport
- Sport: Handball
- Current club: Ringkøbing Håndbold (coach)

Senior clubs
- Years: Team
- –: Bjerringbro KFUM
- 1998–2000: Yellow Winterthur
- 2000–2003: Bjerringbro FH
National team
Years	Team	Apps	(Gls)
1989–1995	Denmark	55	(129)

Teams managed
- 2003–2004: Yellow Winterthur
- 2004–2006: SK Aarhus
- 2008–2012: Great Britain (w)
- 2012–2016: Switzerland (w)
- 2013–2017: SK Aarhus
- 2017–2/2018: China (w)
- 2019–: Ringkøbing Håndbold

Jesper Holmris (born 21 December 1970) is a Danish handball coach for Ringkøbing Håndbold.

== Career ==
Holmris started playing handball at the age of 7. He played for Yellow Winterthur in Switzerland and Bjerringbro FH in Denmark. He played 55 matches for the Danish national team. When he made his debut for the Danish national team in 1989, he became the first ever Bjerringbro player to play for the national team.

At the age of 29 he became player-assistant coach at the Swiss club Yellow Winterthur. After two seasons he returned to Denmark to join Bjerringbro FH in the second tier. In the 2001-02 season he reached the final of the Danish Championship, where Bjerringbro lost to KIF Kolding.

After retiring he became the head coach of his former club Yellow Winterthur in the 2003-04 season. He was the coach for SK Aarhus from 2004 to 2006 and from 2013 to 2017.

From 2006 to 2012 he coached the Great Britain women's national handball team. At the 2012 Summer Olympics he got a 12th place finish with the team. Afterwards, he became the head coach of the Swiss national team, where he was until 2016.

In 2017 he was appointed head coach of China, with the ambition to lead them to the 2020 Olympics. At the 2017 World Women's Handball Championship he coached the Chinese women's national team, where they got a 22nd place. In February 2018 he was fired as the Chinese head coach.

In 2019 he became the head coach of Ringkøbing Håndbold. In 2022 he extended his contract until 2024, and in 2024 he extended it once again until 2026.
