= Roskilde Congress & Sports Centre =

Conference venue and indoor arena in Roskilde, Denmark

Coordinates: 55°38′09.16″N 12°04′05.42″E

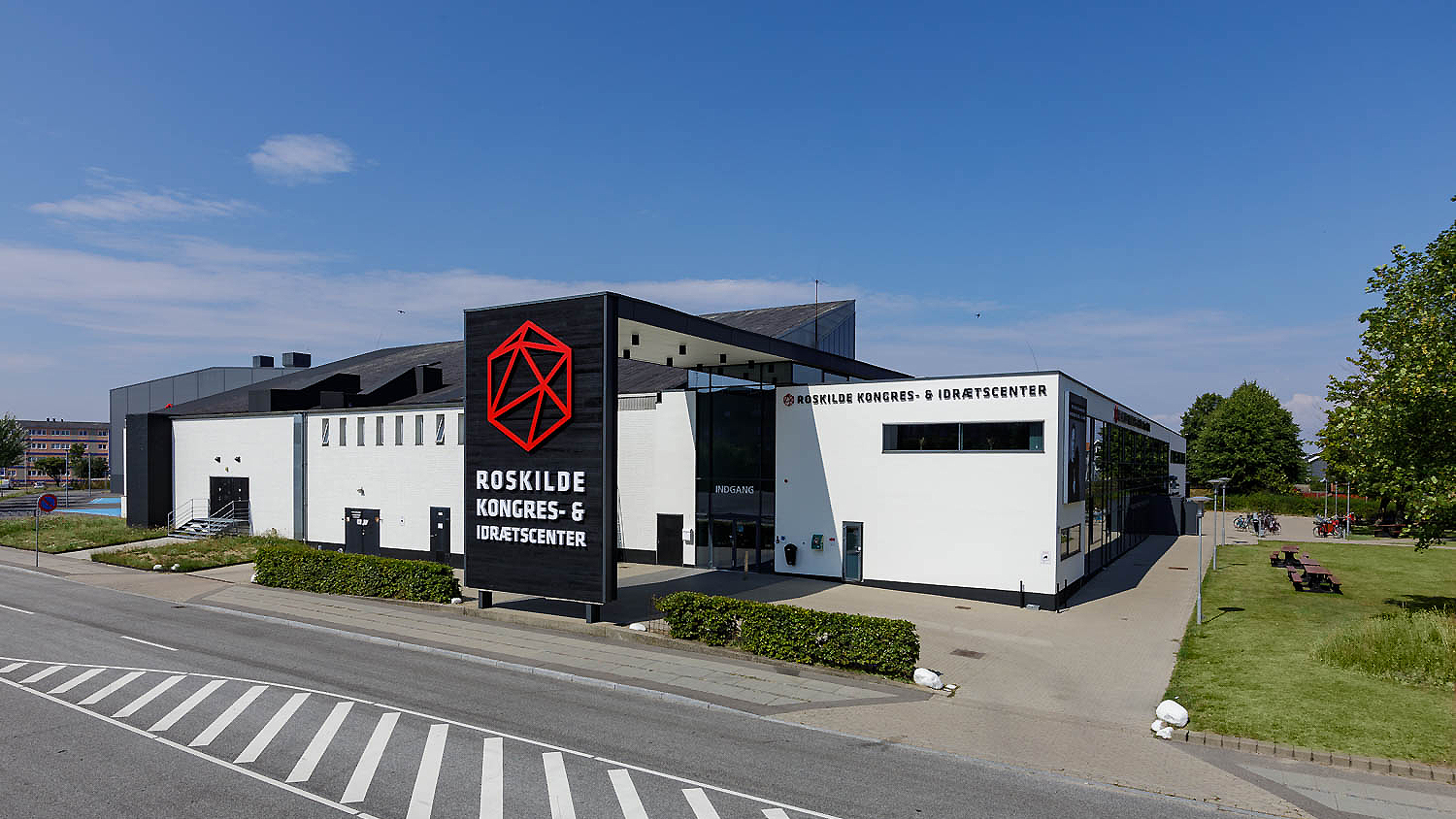
Entrance to the venue in 2022.

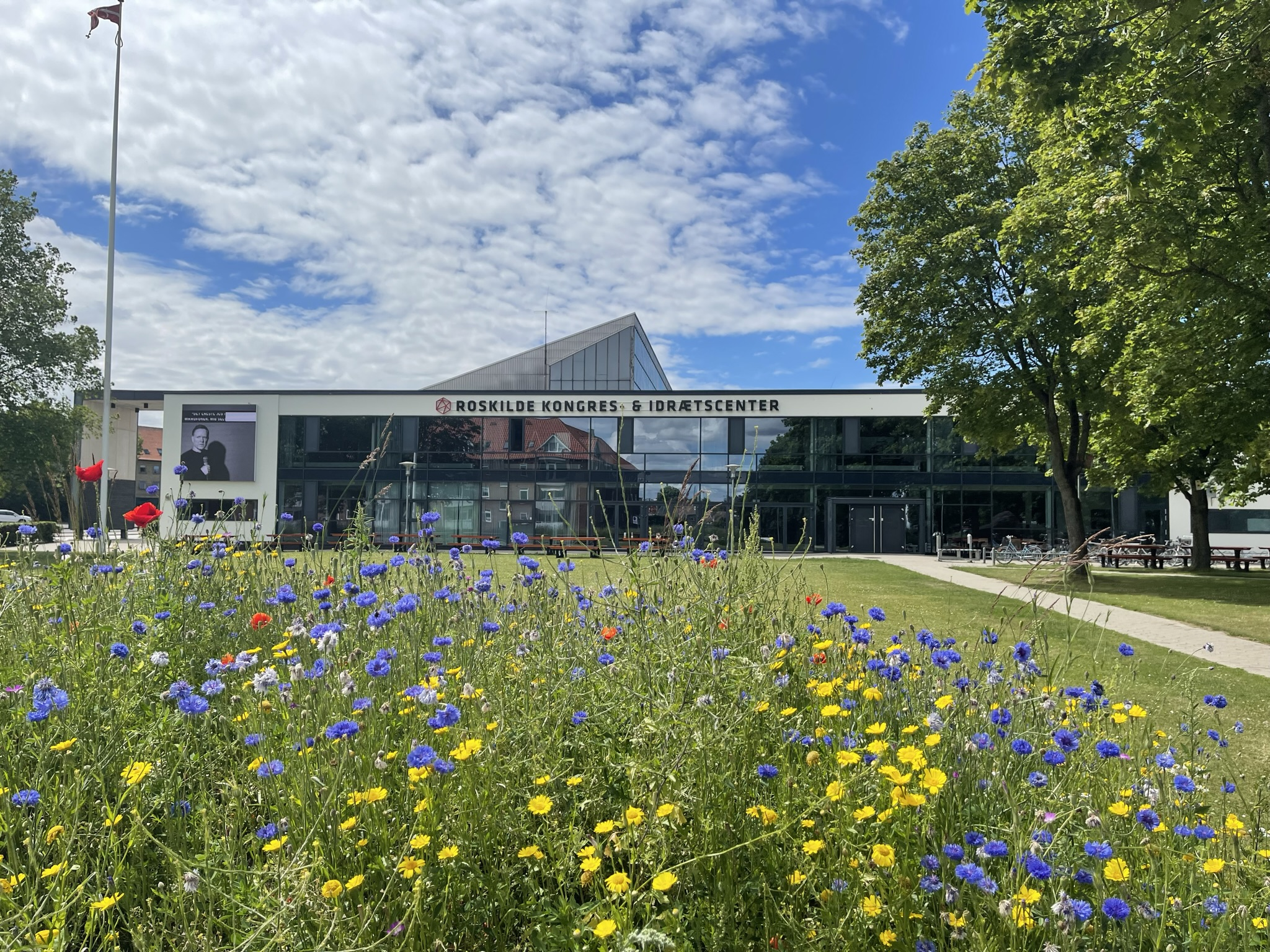
The lawn in front of Roskilde Congress & Sports Centre

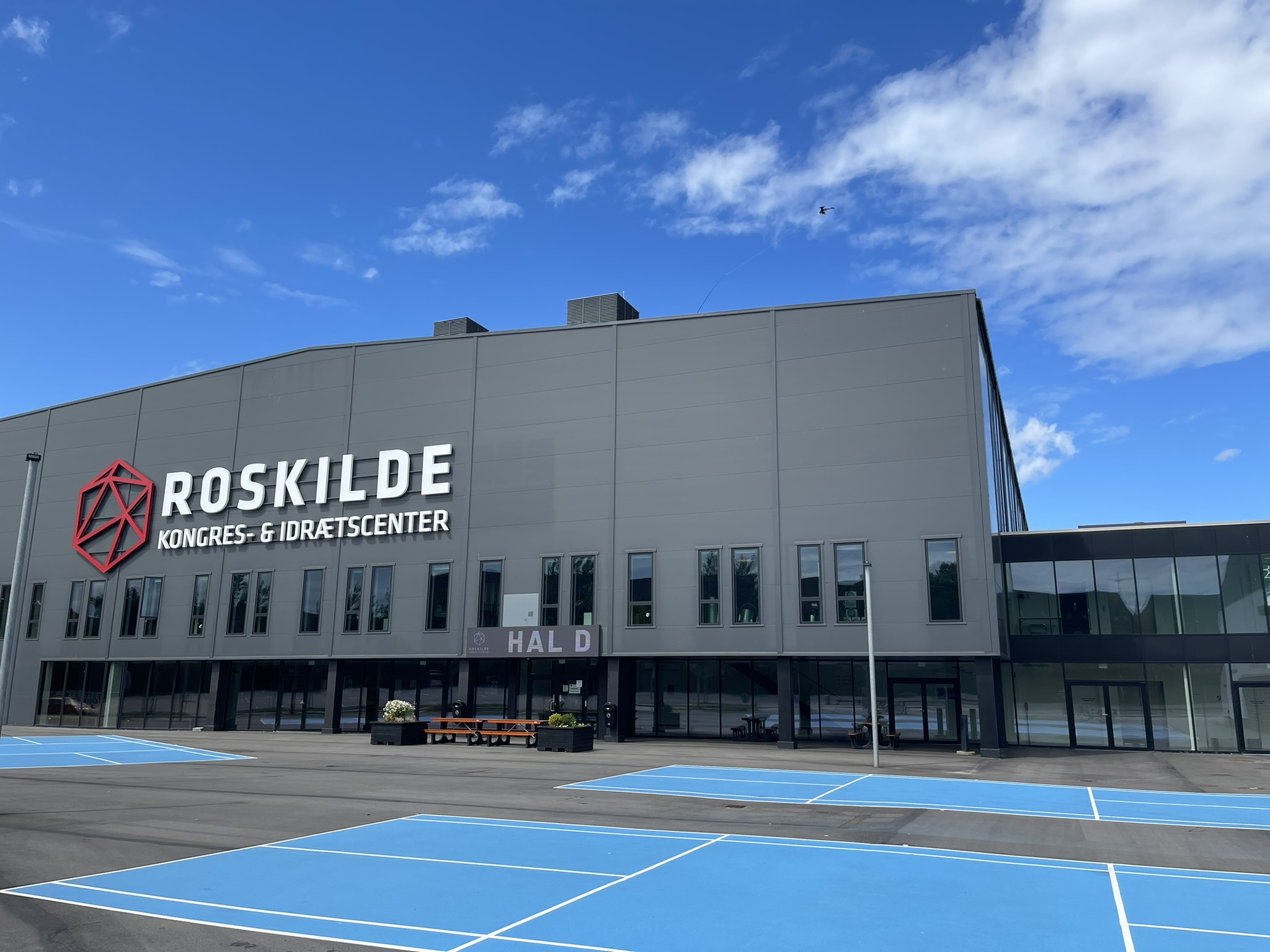
Arena in Roskilde Congress and Sports Centre

Roskilde Congress & Sports Centre (Danish: Roskilde Kongres & Idrætscenter) is a multi-purpose venue in downtown Roskilde, Denmark. It is used for conferences, meetings, sport events, fairs, concerts, theatre and parties. There are rooms and halls for 20 to 2,500 guests and an exhibition area of 6,500 square metres.

== History ==
The centre originally opened in 1959 under the name *Roskildehallen* and has since undergone several expansions and modernisations. In 2013, a major extension was completed, including the construction of Hall D, designed by Danish architecture firm Christensen & Co. The venue has developed from a local sports hall into one of the largest multifunctional event centres on Zealand outside of Copenhagen.

== Facilities ==
Roskilde Congress & Sports Centre comprises four multi‑purpose halls with a total indoor area of approximately 13,500 m². The largest, Hall D, seats up to 2,000 spectators for sporting events and around 4,000 for concerts. The venue also features a tiered‑seating auditorium for up to 900 guests, eight meeting rooms, 20 changing rooms, and a large exhibition foyer.

The in‑house restaurant has earned the Silver Organic Cuisine Label (Det Økologiske Spisemærke i sølv), certifying that 60–90 % of ingredients used are organic. Meals are prepared from scratch using seasonal and sustainable produce.

The centre enjoys approximately 750 free parking spaces, some equipped with charging stations.

== Events and Usage ==
The centre is used for a wide variety of purposes, including sporting events, business conferences and events, trade fairs, public exhibitions, concerts, private parties, and local community events. It serves as the home ground of Roskilde Handball Club and regularly hosts national sports competitions. It also functions as a concert venue and cultural gathering point for large public events.

== Sustainability and Services ==
Roskilde Congress & Sports Centre has held the international Green Key certification since 2018, demonstrating a commitment to sustainable operations. The venue actively promotes energy efficiency, waste sorting, and partnerships with local and eco-conscious suppliers.

In addition, the centre is registered with God Adgang (Accessible Denmark), indicating high standards of accessibility for diverse user groups such as wheelchair users, the visually or hearing impaired, and those with allergies or cognitive disabilities.

Flexible support services include technical assistance, event planning, and coordination with local service providers.

== Location and Access ==
The venue is centrally located in Roskilde on the island of Zealand, approximately 30 kilometres west of Copenhagen. It is within walking distance of Roskilde Station, which provides frequent train connections to and from Copenhagen and other parts of Denmark. The location makes the venue easily accessible for both regional and national events, whether by public transport or car.
