= EH Aalborg =

Danish handball club

- Full name: Elitehåndbold Aalborg
- Founded: 2014; 12 years ago
- Arena: Skansen
- Capacity: 1,200
- President: Erik Pedersen
- Head coach: Peter Jagd
- League: Damehåndboldligaen
- 2025-26: 12th
- Club colours
Home	Away

EH Aalborg is a handball club from Aalborg and Nørresundby, Denmark. Currently, EH Aalborg competes in the women's Damehåndboldligaen. The home arena of the club is Nørresundby Idrætscenter.

== History ==
The club was founded in 2014 under the name Team Abybro as a fusion of Visse IF and Åbybro HK. The intention was to create a top women's team around Aalborg and in general the Northern Jutland region, after Aalborg DH went bankrupt in 2013. In their first season they started in the Danish 2nd Division, the third tier of Danish handball, where they were promoted in the first attempt. In their second season, their first in the 1st division, they changed the name of the club to EH Aalborg. They also started playing matches at Nørresundby Idrætscenter in Nørresundby, as well as at DGI-Huset in Aabybro.

In 2017-18 the club was promoted to the Damehåndboldligaen, the top division in Denmark. They were however relegated again only two years later, after they were in last place when the league was cancelled with 7th rounds to go due to the COVID-19 pandemic. Skanderborg Håndbold and EH Aalborg both had 7 points at the time, but EH Aalborg had a worse head-to-head record. The club protested the decision, proposing instead that there should be no relegated teams and that the 2020-21 season should have 15 teams instead. Their proposal was ultimately rejected.

In 2024, the club secured promotion for the Danish Women's Handball League after four years in the Danish 1st Division.

Location of EH Aalborg

== Kits ==
HOME
2018–19	2019–20

== Team ==
=== Current squad ===
Squad for the 2026-27 season

Goalkeeper

- 1 (Denmark) Natasha Schibler
- 12 (Denmark) Freja Fonseca
- 16 (Denmark) Johanne Bagger Graugaard (Pregnant)

LW

- 3 (Denmark) Frida Ulrichsen
- 17 (Denmark) Lin Johannsen

RW

- 7 (Denmark) Malene Lau Dahlmann
- 28 (Denmark) Maiken Skov Nielsen

Pivots

- 9 (Denmark) Camilla Thorhauge
- 23 (Denmark) Emma Christensen
- 24 (Denmark) Emilie Schleicher

Back players
LB

- 6 (Denmark) Julie Søndergaard Lilholt
- 11 (Denmark) Sofie Uggerhøj Christensen
- 36 (Denmark) Louise Søndergaard Madsen

CB

- 4 (Denmark) Filippa Fransson Christensen
- 20 (Netherlands) Alysa Korterink
- 38 (Denmark) Caroline Eisenhardt

RB

- 8 (Denmark) Anne Sofie Nørregaard Thorbøll
- 10 (Denmark) Frida Høgaard

=== Staff ===
Pos.	Name
Head Coach	(Denmark) Kenneth Hedegaard
Assistant Coach	(Denmark) Søren Mortensen
Assistant Coach	(Denmark) Jonas Ingvorsen
Goalkeeper Trainer	(Denmark) Anders Grøn
Physiotherapist	(Denmark) Jens Erik Jørgensen
Physical Trainer	(Denmark) Brian Høj
Team Leader	(Denmark) Ann-Britt Holm Jensen

==== Transfers ====
Transfers for the 2026-27 season.

Joining

- (Denmark) Kenneth Hedegaard (Head Coach)
- (Denmark) Søren Mortensen (Assistant Coach)
- (Denmark) Jonas Ingvorsen (Assistant Coach)
- (Denmark) Julie Søndergaard Lilholt (LB) (from (Germany) Füchse Berlin)
- (Denmark) Sofie Uggerhøj Christensen (LB) (from youth team)
- (Denmark) Louise Søndergaard Madsen (LB) (from (Denmark) SIK Viborg)
- (Netherlands) Alysa Korterink (CB) (from (Netherlands) HV Zwartwoud/Kwiek)
- (Denmark) Caroline Eisenhardt (CB) (from (Sweden) Kristianstad Handboll)
- (Denmark) Filippa Fransson Christensen (CB) (from youth team)
- (Denmark) Frida Høgaard (RB) (from (Denmark) Ringkøbing Håndbold)
- (Denmark) Emilie Schleicher (P) (from (Denmark) Skanderborg Håndbold)

- (Denmark) Natasha Schibler (GK) (from (Denmark) Bjerringbro FH)

Leaving

- (Denmark) Morten Chang Holmen (Head Coach) (to (Denmark) Bjerringbro FH)
- (Faroe Islands) Annika Fríðheim Petersen (GK) (to (Poland) Enea MKS Gniezno)
- (Denmark) Helena Sall (LW) (to (Denmark) Bjerringbro FH)
- (Denmark) Frederikke Gulmark (LB) (to (France) ?)
- (Denmark) Ida Hoberg (LB) (to (Germany) HSG Bensheim/Auerbach)
- (Denmark) Mette Brandt Nielsen (CB) (to (Denmark) Silkeborg-Voel KFUM)
- (Denmark) Carla Thomsen (RB) (to (Sweden) Boden Handboll IF)
- (Denmark) Mirja Lyngsø Jensen (P) (to ?)
- (Denmark) Julie Vibe Seeberg (P) (to ?)

== Arena ==
- Name: Nørresundby Idrætscenter
- Capacity: 800
- City: Nørresundby, Aalborg
- Adresse: Lerumbakken 11, 9400 Nørresundby

== Kit manufacturers ==
- (Germany) Adidas
