= Bjerringbro FH =

Women's handball club in Bjerringbro, Denmark

- Full name: Bjerringbro Forenede Håndboldklubber
- Short name: BFH
- Founded: April 1, 1999; 27 years ago
- Arena: Bjerringbro Idræts & Kulturcenter
- Capacity: 1,200
- President: Dennis Jensen
- Head coach: Morten Holmen
- League: Damehåndboldligaen
- 2025–26: 14th (relegated)
- Club colours
Home	Away

Bjerringbro FH or Bjerringbro Forenede Håndboldklubber is a handball club from Bjerringbro, Denmark. Their women's team is currently competes in the Danish 1st Division, since the 2026/27 season. The men's team takes part in Bjerringbro-Silkeborg Håndbold. The home arena of the club is Bjerringbro Idræts & Kulturcenter.

== History ==
Bjerringbro's progenitor club Bjerringbro KFUM was founded in 1950 and until the 1980's they played in the lower leagues of Danish handball. From 1986 to 1990 the men's team were promoted 4 times in a row, and in the 1990's the team bounced between the 1st and the 2nd division.

Bjerringbro FH was founded in 1999 as a fusion of Bjerringbro HK and Bjerringbro KFUM. In the 2001-02 the men's team reached the final of the Danish Championship for the first time, where they lost to KIF Kolding.

The men's team fused in 2005 with Silkeborg-Voel KFUM to create Bjerringbro-Silkeborg. After the 2004-05 season, Silkeborg-Voel had been relegated, and Bjerringbro FH had finished just 1 point ahead of them in 12th.

For the first time in club history on 1 April 2023, the women's team managed to win the Danish 1st Division for the first time and promote to the Damehåndboldligaen for the 2023-24 season, defeating Holstebro Håndbold by the score 33–27. In the 2025-26 season the team were relegated after finishing last in the regular season.

== Results ==
- Danish 1st Division:
  - Winners (1): 2023
  - Third place (2): 2022, 2019

== Team ==
=== Current squad ===
Squad for the 2026–27 season

Goalkeepers

- 1 (Netherlands) Jesse van de Polder
- 12 (Denmark) Josefine Mahler
- 18 (Denmark) Didde Kallehauge

Wingers
LW

- 4 (Denmark) Emilie Bangshøi
- 22 (Denmark) Helena Sall

RW

- 5 (Denmark) Frederikke Waage-Jensen
- 23 (Denmark) Tania Bilde Knudsen

Line players

- 8 (Denmark) Emma Thesbjerg Kofoed
- 13 (Denmark) Rikke Thyrsted Enevoldsen
- 74 (Denmark) Cecilia Lautrup

Back players
LB

- 55 (Denmark) Sille Masi Schønherr
- 71 (Germany) Mia Cecilie Hähner

CB

- 7 (Denmark) Line Gyldenløve Kristensen
- 15 (Denmark) Freja Hauge Hansen
- 37 (Norway) Emma Ready

RB

- 10 (Denmark) Signe Juul Abildgaard

=== Transfers ===
Transfers for the 2026-27 season

Joining

- (Denmark) Morten Chang Holmen (Head Coach) (from (Denmark) EH Aalborg)
- (Denmark) Sarah Ernebjerg Jensen (GK) (from (Denmark) SønderjyskE)
- (Denmark) Natasha Schibler (GK) (from (Denmark) Nordvestjysk Elite)
- (Netherlands) Jesse van de Polder (GK) (from (Denmark) Aarhus Håndbold)
- (Denmark) Helena Sall (LW) (from (Denmark) EH Aalborg)
- (Germany) Mia Cecilie Hähner (LB) (from (Denmark) Ikast Håndbold U19)
- (Denmark) Sille Masi Schønherr (CB) (from (Italy) A.S.D. Handball Leno)
- (Norway) Emma Ready (CB) (from (Denmark) Aarhus Håndbold)
- (Denmark) Freja Hauge Hansen (CB) (from (Denmark) Hadsten Håndbold)
- (Denmark) Frederikke Waage-Jensen (RW) (from (Denmark) Holstebro Håndbold)
- (Denmark) Tania Bilde Knudsen (RW) (from (Denmark) Aarhus Håndbold)
- (Denmark) Emma Thesbjerg Kofoed (P) (from (Denmark) Fredericia HK)
- (Denmark) Rikke Enevoldsen (P)

- (Denmark) Josefine Mahler (GK) (on loan from (Denmark) Nordvestjysk Elite)

Leaving

- (Denmark) Martin Albertsen (Head Coach) (to Italy national team)
- (Denmark) Henrik Pehrson (Assistant Coach) (to ?)
- (Denmark) Ida Marie Kaysen (GK) (to (Denmark) Silkeborg-Voel KFUM)
- (Denmark) Clara Bak (GK) (to (Denmark) Ringkøbing Håndbold)
- (Denmark) Josephine Nordstrøm Olsen (GK) (to ?)
- (Denmark) Mathilde Guldager (LW) (to (Denmark) SønderjyskE)
- (Denmark) Laura Cecilie Jensen (LB) (to (Denmark) SønderjyskE)
- (Denmark) Marianne Haugsted (LB) (to (Denmark) Viborg HK)
- (Denmark) Annika Solberg (CB) (to (Denmark) Skanderborg Håndbold)
- (Denmark) Anna Hviid Bang (RB) (to (Denmark) Skanderborg Håndbold)
- (Denmark) Louise Hald (RW) (to (Denmark) Skanderborg Håndbold)
- (Denmark) Melina Kristensen (RW) (to (Denmark) Viborg HK)
- (Denmark) Sidsel Poulsen (P) (to (Denmark) HH Elite)
- (Denmark) Rikke Dahl Nielsen (P) (to (Denmark) SønderjyskE)
- (Denmark) Caroline Svarre (P) (retires)

- (Denmark) Natasha Schibler (GK) (to (Denmark) EH Aalborg)

== Former players ==
=== Women's ===
- (Denmark) Stine Broløs

=== Men ===
- (Denmark) Jesper Holmris
- (Denmark) Claus Flensborg
- (Denmark) Jan Nielsen
