= 2020–21 Damehåndboldligaen =

Danish handball league season

Damehåndboldligaen
- Season: 2020–21
- Champion: Odense Håndbold (1st title)
- Relegated: Vendsyssel Håndbold
- Champions League: Odense Håndbold; Team Esbjerg
- EHF European League: Viborg HK; Ikast Håndbold
- Matches played: 232
- Goals scored: 12,108 (52.19 per match)
- Top goalscorer: (Denmark) Kristina Jørgensen (269 goals)
- Biggest home win: 22 goals: VHK 41–19 SKA (27 Jan)
- Biggest away win: 23 goals: SKA 12–35 ESB (30 Jan)
- Highest scoring: 69 goals: NFH 33–36 VHK (31 Aug); HIH 33–36 ESB (7 Oct)
- All statistics correct as of 31 May 2021.

The 2020–21 Damehåndboldligaen (known as Bambusa Kvindeligaen for sponsorship reasons) was the 85th season of Damehåndboldligaen, Denmark's premier handball league. Team Esbjerg were the defending champions, Vendsyssel Håndbold were promoted from the 1. division, which was their first season ever in the top division.

Odense Håndbold won the title, and Vendsyssel Håndbold were relegated, as they finished last in the regular season. This was the first time Odense won the Danish championship.

== Team information ==
Locations of the 2020–21 Damehåndboldligaen

Team.	Town	Arena	Capacity
Aarhus United	Aarhus	Ceres Arena Stadionhal	1.200
Ajax København	København	Bavnehøj-Hallen	1.000
Herning-Ikast Håndbold	Ikast	IBF Arena	2.850
HH Elite	Horsens	Forum Horsens	4.000
København Håndbold	København	Frederiksberghallen	1.468
Nykøbing Falster Håndboldklub	Nykøbing Falster; Næstved	LÅNLET Arena; Næstved Arena	1.300; 2,500
Odense Håndbold	Odense	Odense Idrætshal	2.256
Randers HK	Randers	Arena Randers	3.000
Silkeborg-Voel KFUM	Silkeborg	Jysk Arena	3.000
Skanderborg Håndbold	Skanderborg	Skanderborg Fælled	1.700
Team Esbjerg	Esbjerg	Blue Water Dokken	2.549
Holstebro Håndbold	Holstebro	Gråkjær Arena	3.250
Vendsyssel Håndbold	Frederikshavn	DRINX Arena	600
Viborg HK	Viborg	Vibocold Arena Viborg	3.000

=== Head coaches ===
Team	Head coach
København Håndbold	(Denmark) Claus Mogensen
Silkeborg-Voel KFUM	(Denmark) Jakob Andreasen
Odense Håndbold	(Denmark) Ulrik Kirkely
Team Esbjerg	(Denmark) Jesper Jensen
Vendsyssel Håndbold	(Denmark) Thomas Kjær
Holstebro Håndbold	(Sweden) Pether Krautmeyer
Nykøbing Falster HK	(Greenland) Jakob Larsen
Ajax København	(Denmark) Dennis Bo Jensen
Viborg HK	(Denmark) Jakob Vestergaard
Aarhus United	(Denmark) Heine Eriksen
Herning-Ikast Håndbold	(Denmark) Kasper Christensen
Randers HK	(Denmark) Niels Agesen
Skanderborg Håndbold	(Denmark) Jeppe Vestergaard
HH Elite	(Denmark) Lars Frederiksen

== Regular season ==
=== Standings ===
Pos	Team	Pld	W	D	L	GF	GA	GD	Pts	Qualification or relegation
1	Team Esbjerg	26	22	2	2	821	627	+194	46	Championship play-offs + advance to Champions League
2	Odense Håndbold	26	23	0	3	720	619	+101	46	Championship play-offs
3	Viborg HK	26	22	0	4	813	652	+161	44	Championship play-offs
4	Herning-Ikast Håndbold	26	17	1	8	714	624	+90	35	Championship play-offs
5	København Håndbold	26	16	0	10	712	672	+40	32	Championship play-offs
6	Nykøbing Falster Håndbold	26	15	2	9	776	712	+64	32	Championship play-offs
7	Aarhus United	26	11	2	13	614	633	−19	24	Championship play-offs
8	Silkeborg-Voel KFUM	26	10	2	14	664	704	−40	22	Championship play-offs
9	Holstebro Håndbold	26	9	3	14	629	672	−43	21	
10	Ajax København	26	8	3	15	625	653	−28	19	
11	Randers HK	26	9	1	16	605	696	−91	19	
12	HH Elite	26	7	1	18	601	682	−81	15	
13	Skanderborg Håndbold	26	3	0	23	592	768	−176	6	
14	Vendsyssel Håndbold	26	1	1	24	586	758	−172	3	Relegation play-off

Rules for classification: 1.) Points in head-to-head matches amongst tied teams; 2.) Goal difference in head-to-head matches amongst tied teams; 3.) Goals scored in head-to-head matches among tied teams; 4.) Points in all matches; 5.) Goal difference in all matches.

=== Results ===
In the table below the home teams are listed on the left and the away teams along the top.

Home \ Away	AAR	AJA	HIH	HHE	KBH	NFH	OHC	RHK	SIL	SKA	ESB	TTH	VEN	VHK
Aarhus United		21–20	22–30	29–18	18–21	23–20	18–22	22–17	20–20	31–18	20–25	18–26	28–22	19–23
Ajax København	21–29		26–23	28–17	20–22	25–25	28–30	32–24	31–20	34–23	23–27	22–24	21–21	24–28
Herning-Ikast Håndbold	30–18	27–23		34–23	24–19	27–30	23–30	33–21	29–28	34–18	33–36	23–23	20–18	28–21
HH Elite	21–29	22–22	24–26		23–22	20–22	24–27	24–29	35–26	25–20	25–34	26–18	24–19	24–33
København Håndbold	32–24	25–18	15–26	29–26		33–31	24–29	26–29	22–27	31–18	27–29	31–27	37–26	31–26
Nykøbing Falster Håndbold	34–26	30–27	30–25	30–23	32–36		26–28	27–19	28–27	38–24	32–28	27–29	32–24	33–36
Odense Håndbold	33–27	26–19	19–18	27–22	32–27	33–30		33–23	32–23	28–21	22–32	23–19	29–19	21–33
Randers HK	18–18	25–26	24–25	24–22	27–30	26–34	21–26		26–23	29–25	25–33	21–19	22–20	26–29
Silkeborg-Voel	27–21	29–19	20–36	23–24	26–28	26–30	18–28	26–21		30–24	28–36	27–25	27–24	22–32
Skanderborg Håndbold	22–27	19–21	26–31	28–21	23–38	27–35	25–26	22–21	25–27		12–35	26–28	24–28	27–36
Team Esbjerg	35–25	31–21	34–28	31–20	29–20	38–26	29–28	34–16	29–29	27–24		32–21	39–22	28–30
Holstebro Håndbold	24–29	32–25	25–28	23–22	18–28	26–26	22–23	24–25	21–27	27–26	22–22		29–28	27–31
Vendsyssel Håndbold	24–25	24–30	22–27	19–27	28–37	25–39	25–33	22–23	26–29	19–26	15–34	23–29		24–30
Viborg HK	30–27	29–19	29–26	30–19	36–21	31–29	23–32	41–23	32–29	41–19	33–34	33–21	37–19	

Legend: Blue = home team win; Yellow = draw; Red = away team win.

== Championship playoffs ==
=== Group 1 ===
Pos	Team	Pld	W	D	L	GF	GA	GD	Pts	Qualification	HIH	ESB	KBH	SIL
1	Herning-Ikast Håndbold	6	5	0	1	183	151	+32	11	Advance to semi-finals	—	30–27	26–29	29–22
2	Team Esbjerg	6	4	0	2	186	158	+28	10	Advance to semi-finals	21–31	—	33–23	35–27
3	København Håndbold	6	2	0	4	157	177	−20	4		25–30	25–33	—	26–29
4	Silkeborg-Voel	6	1	0	5	153	193	−40	2		27–37	22–37	26–29	—

Source: DHF
Rules for classification: See Tiebreakers

=== Group 2 ===
Pos	Team	Pld	W	D	L	GF	GA	GD	Pts	Qualification	OHC	VHK	AAR	NFH
1	Odense Håndbold	6	3	1	2	175	161	+14	9	Advance to semi-finals	—	30–25	30–23	27–27
2	Viborg HK	6	4	0	2	178	154	+24	9	Advance to semi-finals	34–30	—	30–15	28–23
3	Aarhus United Elitehandball	6	2	1	3	145	170	−25	5		27–26	23–29	—	28–26
4	Nykøbing Falster Håndboldklub	6	1	2	3	163	176	−13	4		25–32	33–32	29–29	—

Source: DHF
Rules for classification: See Tiebreakers

=== Semi-finals ===
Date		Home team in the 1st match	Home team in the 2nd match	Results	
1st match	2nd match	Home team in the 1st match	Home team in the 2nd match	1st match	2nd match
11 May	15 May	Odense Håndbold	Team Esbjerg	27–26	28–27
12 May	15 May	Ikast Håndbold	Viborg HK	35–32	18–28

! Best of three matches. In the case of a tie after the second match, a third match is played. Highest ranking team in the regular season has the home advantage in the first and possible third match.

=== 3rd place ===
Date			Home team in the 1st match & 3rd match	Home team in the 2nd match	Results		
1st match	2nd match	3rd match	Home team in the 1st match & 3rd match	Home team in the 2nd match	1st match	2nd match	3rd match
22 May	25 May	31 May	Team Esbjerg	Ikast Håndbold	29–29	23-23	28-29

! Best of three matches. In the case of a tie after the second match, a third match is played. Highest ranking team in the regular season has the home advantage in the first and possible third match.

=== Final ===
Date		Home team in the 1st match & 3rd match	Home team in the 2nd match	Results	
1st match	2nd match	Home team in the 1st match & 3rd match	Home team in the 2nd match	1st match	2nd match
22 May	29 May	Odense Håndbold	Viborg HK	28–20	30-26

! Best of three matches. In the case of a tie after the second match, a third match is played. Highest ranking team in the regular season has the home advantage in the first and possible third match.

== Relegation playoff ==
! Best of three matches. In the case of a tie after the second match, a third match is played. Highest ranking team in the regular season has the home advantage in the first and possible third match.

Date		Home team in the 1st match	Home team in the 2nd match	Results	
1st match	2nd match	Home team in the 1st match	Home team in the 2nd match	1st match	2nd match
09 May	12 May	Horsens HK	SønderjyskE	32–28	31–27

== Season statistics ==
=== Top goalscorers ===
As of 1 June 2021

==== Regular season ====
Rank	Player	Club	Goals
1	(Denmark) Kristina Jørgensen	Viborg HK	180
2	(Norway) Stine Skogrand	Herning-Ikast	168
3	(Sweden) Kristin Thorleifsdóttir	Randers HK	137
4	(Sweden) Melissa Petrén	HH Elite	134
5	(Denmark) Mia Rej	Odense Håndbold	129
6	(Denmark) Julie Jensen	Silkeborg-Voel	122
7	(Norway) Ingvild Bakkerud	Herning-Ikast	121
7	(Denmark) Sofia Deen	Skanderborg Håndbold	121
9	(Denmark) Line Haugsted	Viborg HK	120
9	(Netherlands) Lois Abbingh	Odense Håndbold	120

==== Overall ====
Rank	Player	Club	Goals
1	(Denmark) Kristina Jørgensen	Viborg HK	269
2	(Norway) Stine Skogrand	Herning-Ikast	214
3	(Netherlands) Lois Abbingh	Odense Håndbold	195
4	(Norway) Ingvild Bakkerud	Herning-Ikast	179
5	(Denmark) Line Haugsted	Viborg HK	176
6	(Denmark) Mia Rej	Odense Håndbold	163
7	(Denmark) Mathilde Neesgaard	Aarhus United	160
8	(Sweden) Melissa Petrén	HH Elite	157
9	(Sweden) Kristin Thorleifsdóttir	Randers HK	156
9	(Norway) Marit Røsberg Jacobsen	Team Esbjerg	156

=== Top goalkeepers ===
As of 1 June 2021

Rank	Player	Club	%	Saves	Shots
1	(Denmark) Althea Reinhardt	OHC	38,5	260	676
2	(Norway) Rikke Marie Granlund	ESB	37,4	238	636
3	(Sweden) Jessica Ryde	HIH	36,1	254	704
4	(Denmark) Anna Kristensen	VHK	35,4	432	1221
5	(Sweden) Johanna Bundsen	KBH	34,8	223	641
6	(Denmark) Ditte Vind	TTH	34,7	326	939
7	(Germany) Sabine Englert	HIH	34,4	227	660
8	(Sweden) Martina Thörn	AAR	34,2	262	767
9	(Sweden) Nora Persson	AAR	33,8	141	417
10	(Turkey) Sara Keçeci	TTH	39,8	47	118

=== Top assists ===
As of 1 June 2021

Rank	Player	Club	Assists
1	(Denmark) Kristina Jørgensen	VHK	147
2	(Netherlands) Larissa Nüsser	KBH	134
3	(Denmark) Kristina Kristiansen	NFH	127
4	(Austria) Sonja Frey	ESB	110
5	(Norway) Helene Gigstad Fauske	HIH	109
6	(Denmark) Julie Jensen	SIL	103
7	(Norway) Eira Aune	SIL	102
8	(Netherlands) Lois Abbingh	OHC	98
9	(Netherlands) Nycke Groot	OHC	97
10	(Norway) Moa Högdahl	VHK	38

=== All-Star Team ===
Position	Player
Goalkeeper	(Denmark) Anna Kristensen (Viborg HK)
Right wing	(Norway) Marit Røsberg Jacobsen (Team Esbjerg)
Right back	(Norway) Stine Skogrand (Herning-Ikast Håndbold)
Centre back	(Denmark) Mia Rej (København Håndbold/Odense Håndbold)
Left back	(Denmark) Kristina Jørgensen (Viborg HK)
Left wing	(Denmark) Lærke Nolsøe (Nykøbing Falster HK)
Pivot	(Norway) Marit Frafjord (Team Esbjerg)

=== Monthly awards ===
Month	Player of the Month	
Month	Player	Club
September	(Denmark) Kristina Jørgensen	Viborg HK
October	(Denmark) Lærke Nolsøe	Nykøbing Falster HK
November	(Denmark) Mia Rej	Odense Håndbold
January	(Norway) Stine Skogrand	Herning-Ikast Håndbold
February	(Denmark) Sofia Deen	Skanderborg Håndbold
March	(Denmark) Kristina Jørgensen	København Håndbold
April	(Denmark) Mie Højlund	Odense Håndbold

=== Coach of the season ===
(Denmark) Dennis Bo Jensen - Ajax København

== Number of teams by regions ==
No. teams	Region	Teams
8	Midtjylland	Aarhus United, Herning-Ikast Håndbold, HH Elite, Randers HK, Silkeborg-Voel KFUM, Skanderborg Håndbold, Holstebro Håndbold, Viborg HK
2	Hovedstaden	København Håndbold, Ajax København
2	Syddanmark	Team Esbjerg, Odense Håndbold
1	Nordjylland	Vendsyssel Håndbold
1	Sjælland	Nykøbing Falster Håndboldklub
