= Julie Pontoppidan =

Danish handball player (born 1996)

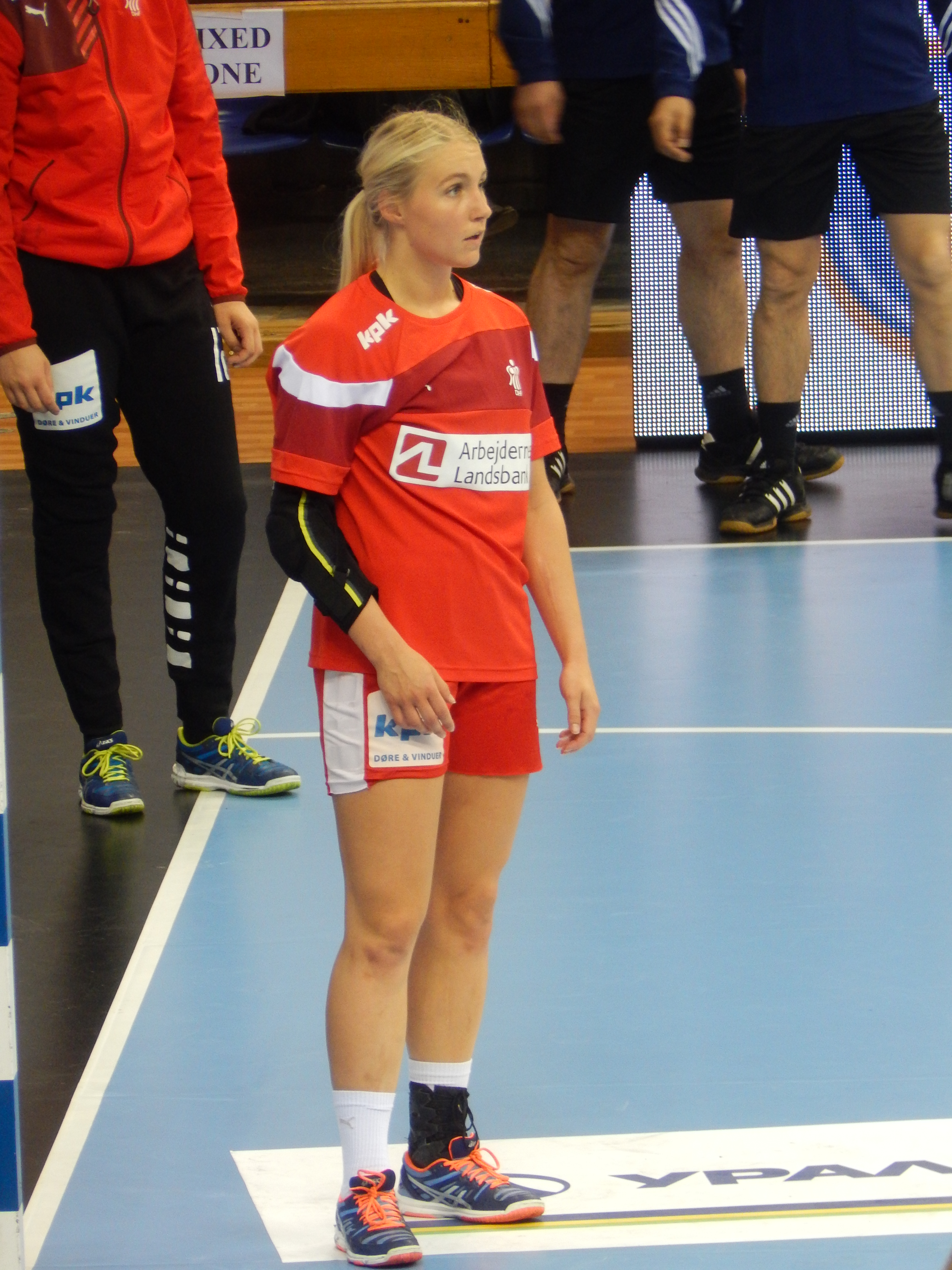
- Pontoppidan in 2016 at the Junior World Handball Championship

Personal information
- Full name: Julie Pontoppidan
- Nationality: Danish
- Born: 28 August 1996 (age 30) Aarhus, Denmark
- Height: 1.73 m (5 ft 8 in)

Sport
- Sport: Handball
- Position: Centre Back
- Current club: HBC Celles-sur-Belle
- Number: 5

Senior clubs
- Years: Team
- 2013-2014: IK Skovbakken
- 2014-2017: SK Aarhus
- 2017-2020: Aarhus United
- 2020-2022: Randers HK
- 2022-: HBC Celles-sur-Belle
Medal record
IHF Junior World Championship
Gold medal – first place	2016 Russia
IHF Youth World Championship
Gold medal – first place	2015 Spain
European Youth Olympic Festival
Gold medal – first place	2013 Utrecht

Julie Pontoppidan (born 28 August 1996) is a Danish handball player who currently plays for French league club Handball Club Celles-sur-Belle.

She used to play for Aarhus United and Randers HK.

She has played over 30 matches for the Danish youth national team.

== Achievements ==
- Danish Cup
  - Bronze Medalist: 2017 (with Aarhus United)
