= Cecilie Mørch Hansen =

Danish handball player (born 1993)

Cecilie Hansen
Personal information
- Full name: Cecilie Mørch Hansen
- Nationality: Danish
- Born: 8 December 1993 (age 32) Randers, Denmark
- Height: 1.72 m (5 ft 8 in)

Sport
- Sport: Handball
- Position: Left Back
- Current club: Aarhus United
- Number: 8

Senior clubs
- Years: Team
- 2011-2013: Randers HK
- 2013-2014: Vejen EH
- 2014-2015: Halden HK
- 2015-2017: Ringkøbing Håndbold
- 2017-2019: Randers HK
- 2019-2020: EH Aalborg
- 2020-2021: Aarhus United
- 2021-: Skanderborg Håndbold

Cecilie Mørch Hansen (born 8 December 1993) is a Danish handball player who played for Skanderborg Håndbold in the Danish Women's Handball League from 2021 to 2023. She has previously played for Randers HK.
