= Emma Mogensen =

Danish handball player (born 1994)

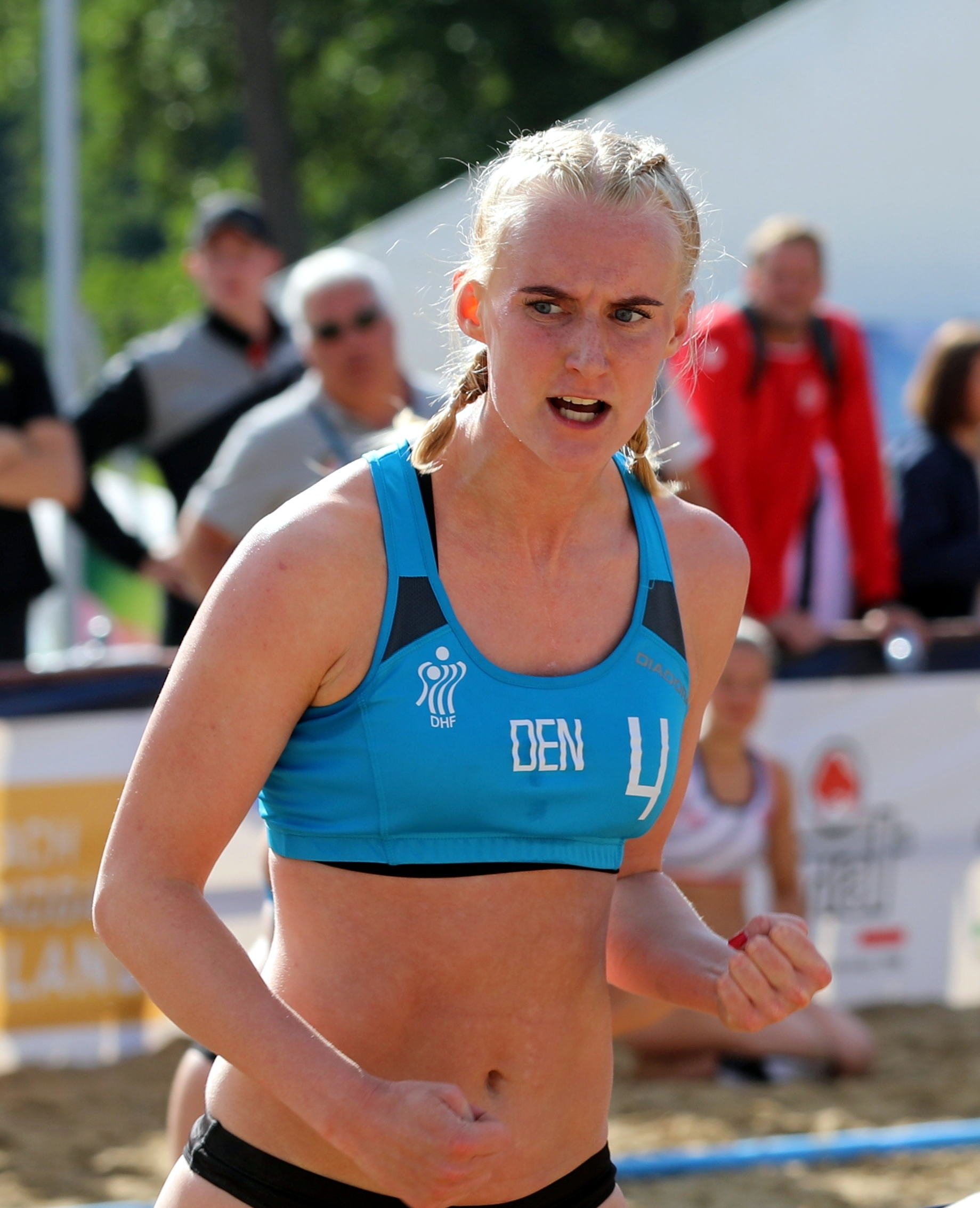

Personal information
- Full name: Emma Kjærgaard Mogensen
- Nationality: Danish
- Born: 24 September 1994 (age 32)
- Height: 1.82 m (6 ft 0 in)

Sport
- Sport: Handball
- Position: Centre Back
- Current club: Aarhus Håndbold
- Number: 7

Senior clubs
- Years: Team
- 2011-2017: SK Aarhus
- 2017-: Aarhus United
National team
Years	Team	Apps	(Gls)
2013-	Denmark Beach Handball	49	(35)
Medal record
IHF Junior World Championship
Bronze medal – third place	2014 Croatia
Women's Beach handball
Representing Denmark
World Championships
Silver medal – second place	2026 Croatia
European Championship
Gold medal – first place	2019 Stare Jabłonki
Silver medal – second place	2019 Varna
- Updated on 31 March 2025

Emma Kjærgaard Mogensen (born 24 September 1994) is a Danish handball player who currently plays for Aarhus Håndbold, where she is the club captain. She is also a beach handball player.

She was on the Danish team, that won gold medals at the 2019 European Beach Handball Championship and silver medals at 2021 European Beach Handball Championship.

In the 2024-25 season she was relegated with Aarhus Håndbold after finishing last in the regular season.

== Achievements ==
- Danish Cup
  - Bronze Medalist: 2017
