= HBC Celles-sur-Belle =

French handball club

- Full name: Handball Club Celles-sur-Belle
- Nickname(s): les Belles de Celles
- Founded: 1976
- Arena: Complexe sportif de Celles sur belle
- Capacity: 1,300
- President: Fréderic Vignier
- Head coach: Thierry Vincent
- League: French Women's Handball Championship
- 2021–22: 13th
- Club colours

HBC Celles-sur-Belle is a women's handball team based in Celles-sur-Belle, France that plays in the LFH Féminine Division.

== Team ==
=== Current squad ===
Squad for the season 2022-23 - Professional players

Goalkeepers

- 1 (France) Laura Portes
- 12 (France) Jessica Sogoyou
- 16 (France) Justine Hicquebrant (c)

Wingers
LW

- 13 (France) Hawa Kanté
- 96 (France) Lisa Calvet

RW

- 6 (France) Charline Aube-Bubl
- 7 (France) Lesly Briémant

Line players

- 9 (France) Laura Dorp
- 10 (France) Goundouba Guirassy
- 21 (Denmark) Mirja Lyngsø Jensen

Back players
LB

- 5 (France) Marjorie Demunck
- 11 (Portugal) Carolina Loureiro
- 22 (Sweden) Hanna Åhlén
- 42 (France) Perrine Petiot

CB

- 55 (Denmark) Julie Pontoppidan
- 78 (France) Fanta Diagouraga

RB

- 8 (Serbia) Dijana Števin
- 19 (Cameroon) Paola Ebanga Baboga

=== Transfers ===
Transfers for the 2023–24 season

Joining

- (Norway) Emma Skinnehaugen (LW) (from (Norway) Larvik HK)

Leaving

=== Technical staff ===
Staff for the 2022-23 season.

- (France) Head coach: Thierry Vincent
- (France) Assistant coach: Maxime Martin
- (France) Physical coach: Fabian Renouf
