= Sara Madsen =

Danish handball player (born 2000)

Personal information
- Full name: Sara Jakobsen Madsen
- Nationality: Danish
- Born: 1 August 2000 (age 26) Frederikshavn, Denmark
- Height: 1.90 m (6 ft 3 in)

Sport
- Sport: Handball
- Position: Right Back
- Current club: Ringkøbing Håndbold
- Number: 11

Senior clubs
- Years: Team
- 2017–2018: Frederikshavn fI
- 2017–2019: Vendsyssel Håndbold
- 2019: EH Aalborg
- 2019-2020: Sæby HK
- 2020-2021: Oppsal IF
- 2021-2022: Vendsyssel Håndbold
- 2021–2023: Hadsten Håndbold
- 2023–2026: Silkeborg-Voel KFUM
- 2026–: Ringkøbing Håndbold

Sara Jakobsen Madsen (born 30 September 1995) is a Danish handball player who currently plays for Ringkøbing Håndbold in the Danish Women's Handball League. She has briefly represented the Danish youth national team.

Madsen has played in a variety of clubs in the lower divisions of the Danish leagues and also a short stay in Oppsal IF in Norway. The teams include Vendsyssel Håndbold, EH Aalborg, Hadsten Håndbold and recently Silkeborg-Voel KFUM with whom she played for three seasons. In April 2026, she signed a 1-year contract with Ringkøbing Håndbold.
