= Anne-Sofie Ernstrøm =

Danish handball player (born 1992)

Personal information
- Full name: Anne-Sofie Ernstrøm
- Nationality: Danish
- Born: 7 December 1992 (age 33) Ikast, Denmark
- Height: 183 cm (72 in)

Sport
- Sport: Handball
- Position: Goalkeeper
- Current club: Retired

Youth career
- Years: Team
- –: Ikast FS

Senior clubs
- Years: Team
- 2010-2015: Skive fH
- 2015-2017: SK Aarhus
- 2017-2019: Aarhus United
Medal record
European Junior Championship
Gold medal – first place	2011 Netherlands
Youth Olympic Games
Gold medal – first place	2010 Singapore

Anne-Sofie Ernstrøm (born 7 December 1992) is a Danish former handball player who played for Aarhus United, SK Århus and Skive fH.

She started playing handball at the age of 10 at Ikast FS.
