= Ane Eidem =

Norwegian handball player (born 1993)

Personal information
- Full name: Ane Eidem
- Nationality: Norwegian
- Born: 21 January 1993 (age 33) Elnesvågen, Norway
- Height: 1.73 m (5 ft 8 in)

Sport
- Sport: Handball
- Position: Right Back
- Current club: Retired
- Number: 3

Senior clubs
- Years: Team
- –2014: Levanger HK
- 2014–2015: SCM Craiova
- 2015-2016: Ringkøbing Håndbold

Ane Eidem (born 21 January 1993) is a Norwegian handballer who played for Ringkøbing Håndbold in Denmark, SCM Craiova in Romania and Levanger HK in Norway. She retired in 2016.

She is a twin sister of Vilde Eidem who played for HK Halden.
