= 2026 World Senior Curling Championships =

- Host city: Geneva, Switzerland
- Arena: Geneva Sous-Moulin Sports Center
- Dates: April 24 – May 2
- Men's winner: United States
- Skip: Mike Farbelow
- Third: Rich Ruohonen
- Second: Bill Stopera
- Lead: Darren Lehto
- Coach: Pete Annis
- Finalist: Scotland (Brewster)
- Women's winner: Scotland
- Skip: Jackie Lockhart
- Third: Mairi Milne
- Second: Claire Milne
- Lead: Katie Loudon
- Finalist: Germany (Belkofer-Kröhnert)

The 2026 World Senior Curling Championships (branded as the 2026 ACE & Company World Senior Curling Championship for sponsorship reasons) were held from April 24 to May 2 at the Geneva Sous-Moulin Sports Center in Geneva, Switzerland. The event was held alongside the 2026 World Mixed Doubles Curling Championship.

== Men ==
=== Teams ===
The teams are listed as follows:

Australia	Austria	Belgium	Canada	Czech Republic
Fourth: Geoff Davis; Third: Steve Johns; Second: Steve Hewitt; Skip: Hugh Millikin	Skip: Gernot Higatzberger; Third: Hubert Gründhammer; Second: Alois Genner; Lead: Peter Kramlinger; Alternate: Markus Stefan	Skip: Tom van Waterschoot; Third: Stephane Vandermeeren; Second: Chris van Rosmalen; Lead: Guy Bilsen	Skip: Bruce Korte; Third: Darrell McKee; Second: Kory Kohuch; Lead: Rory Golanowski; Alternate: Arlen Hall	Skip: David Šik; Third: Marek Brožek; Second: Pavel Mensík; Lead: Jiří Chobot
Denmark	England	Estonia	Finland	France
Skip: Søren Tidmand; Third: Bo Legård; Second: Kent Petersson; Lead: Jens Groth Lorentzen	Fourth: Douglas McGlynn; Third: Stuart Brand; Second: Martin Gregory; Skip: Andy McGlynn	Skip: Margus Tubalkain; Third: Valvo Vooremä; Second: Tonis Turmann; Lead: Hannes Reinola; Alternate: Jaanus Jegorov	Fourth: Aki Jokela; Third: Jari Hakkinen; Second: Pekka Jantti; Skip: Olli Rissanen; Alternate: Kimmo Älto	Skip: Mathieu Chauveau; Third: Christian Tourrette; Second: Stephane Koenig; Lead: Philippe Therias; Alternate: Laurent Dehais
Germany	Greece	Hong Kong	Hungary	Ireland
Skip: Uwe Saile; Third: Sven Goldemann; Second: Christoph Möckel; Lead: Rüdiger Kühlwein	Skip: Athanasios Pantios; Third: Dionysios Karakostas; Second: Nikolaos Zacharias; Lead: Dimitrios Kolonas	Skip: Wong Chun Ngok; Third: Li Shek Chong John; Second: Randy Cheung; Lead: Chung Hon Keung	Skip: György Nagy; Third: Zoltan Jakab; Second: Gábor Bartalus; Lead: Krisztián Barna	Skip: Bill Gray; Third: Neil Fyfe; Second: Alastair Fyfe; Lead: Tommy Campbell; Alternate: Ross Barr
Israel	Italy	Japan	Latvia	Netherlands
Skip: Alex Pokras; Third: Aaron Horowitz; Second: Henrique Kempenich; Lead: Yoram Miller	Skip: Antonio Menardi; Third: Valter Bombassei; Second: Marco Constantini; Lead: Massimo Antonelli	Skip: Tamotsu Matsumura; Third: Seiji Yamamoto; Second: Akira Otsuka; Lead: Takahito Tomiyasu	Skip: Ansis Regža; Third: Jānis Rēdlihs; Second: Aivars Purmalis; Lead: Aivars Lācis	Skip: Bob Bomas; Third: Willem van Wieringen; Second: Andre de Jong; Lead: Cristian San Felipe; Alternate: Johannes Koornstra
New Zealand	Nigeria	Norway	Philippines	Poland
Skip: Philip Dowling; Third: Kenny Thomson; Second: Gordon Hay; Lead: Dean Fotti	Skip: T. J. Cole; Third: Robert Brianne; Second: Charles Neimeth; Lead: Aswad Allen; Alternate: Damola Daniel	Skip: Rolf Sagen; Third: Frank Humlekjær; Second: Karsten Sandåker; Lead: Jon Sverre Karterud; Alternate: Arild Hegland	Skip: Jonathan Ochoco; Third: Peter Garbes; Second: Jose Nazareno; Lead: Alastair Onglingswan; Alternate: Jason Garbes	Fourth: Rymwid Błaszczak; Skip: Arkadiusz Detyniecki; Second: Leszek Molski; Lead: Andrzej Smak; Alternate: Jacek Szeliga
Scotland	Slovakia	Slovenia	South Korea	Spain
Skip: Tom Brewster; Third: Frazer Hare; Second: Robbie Stevenson; Lead: Donald Frame	Fourth: Peter Balsan; Third: Peter Mocek; Second: Daniel Sýkora; Skip: Pavel Kocian	Skip: Mitja Resman; Third: Bostjan Ömerzel; Second: Silvo Praprotnik; Lead: Darko Gregori	Skip: Jung Jae-suk; Third: Lee Il-kyu; Second: Son Jin-suk; Lead: Park Jong-won; Alternate: Chung Won-suk	Skip: Víctor Navarro; Third: Alfonso García; Second: Rodrigo García; Lead: Domingo Hernandez
Sweden	Switzerland	United States	Wales	
Skip: Fredrik Julius; Third: Josep Puigdemont; Second: Martin Vallee; Lead: Hasse Norrman; Alternate: Johan Bergman	Skip: Christof Schwaller; Third: Dominic Andres; Second: Robert Hürlimann; Lead: Christoph Kaiser; Alternate: Rolf Iseli	Skip: Mike Farbelow; Third: Rich Ruohonen; Second: Bill Stopera; Lead: Darren Lehto	Skip: Adrian Meikle; Third: Andrew Tanner; Second: Alistair Reid; Lead: Richard Pougher	

=== Round Robin Standings ===
Final Round Robin Standings

Key
Teams to Playoffs

Group A	Skip	W	L	W–L	DSC
Canada	Bruce Korte	4	0	–	28.700
Slovenia	Mitja Resman	3	1	–	121.071
Latvia	Ansis Regža	2	2	–	64.800
Ireland	Bill Gray	1	3	–	70.886
Nigeria	T. J. Cole	0	4	–	132.043

Group B	Skip	W	L	W–L	DSC
United States	Mike Farbelow	4	0	–	28.129
England	Andy McGlynn	3	1	–	25.257
Italy	Antonio Menardi	2	2	–	104.471
Poland	Arkadiusz Detyniecki	1	3	–	74.943
Hong Kong	Chun Ngok Wong	0	4	–	107.429

Group C	Skip	W	L	W–L	DSC
Scotland	Tom Brewster	5	0	–	40.157
Hungary	György Nagy	3	2	–	35.857
Slovakia	Pavel Kocian	2	3	2–0	116.929
Estonia	Margus Tubalkain	2	3	1–1	102.143
Belgium	Tom van Waterschoot	2	3	0–2	79.686
Philippines	Jonathan Ochoco	1	4	–	84.557

Group D	Skip	W	L	W–L	DSC
Switzerland	Christof Schwaller	5	0	–	43.300
Norway	Rolf Sagen	4	1	–	41.300
Japan	Tamotsu Matsumura	2	3	1–1	59.114
South Korea	Jung Jae-suk	2	3	1–1	88.129
Israel	Alex Pokras	2	3	1–1	92.157
Greece	Athanasios Pantios	0	5	–	110.014

Group E	Skip	W	L	W–L	DSC
Austria	Gernot Higatzberger	3	2	3–0	68.457
Australia	Hugh Millikin	3	2	1–2	47.214
Wales	Adrian Meikle	3	2	1–2	48.871
Sweden	Fredrik Julius	3	2	1–2	65.871
Finland	Olli Rissanen	2	3	–	43.957
France	Mathieu Chauveau	1	4	–	111.786

Group F	Skip	W	L	W–L	DSC
Czech Republic	David Šik	5	0	–	81.957
Germany	Uwe Saile	3	2	–	78.671
Spain	Víctor Navarro	2	3	1–1	57.357
Denmark	Søren Tidmand	2	3	1–1	58.086
New Zealand	Philip Dowling	2	3	1–1	75.429
Netherlands	Bob Bomas	1	4	–	52.171

Group A Round Robin Summary Table
Pos.	Country	Canada		Latvia	Nigeria	Slovenia	Record
1	Canada	—	5–3	9–4	16–2	9–2	4–0
4	Ireland	3–5	—	7–8	12–3	2–6	1–3
3	Latvia	4–9	8–7	—	15–5	3–7	2–2
5	Nigeria	2–16	3–12	5–15	—	7–9	0–4
2	Slovenia	2–9	6–2	7–3	9–7	—	3–1

Group B Round Robin Summary Table
Pos.	Country	England	Hong Kong	Italy	Poland	United States	Record
2	England	—	12–2	7–1	10–3	3–10	3–1
5	Hong Kong	2–12	—	5–8	0–13	2–11	0–4
3	Italy	1–7	8–5	—	10–5	2–9	2–2
4	Poland	3–10	13–0	5–10	—	4–12	1–3
1	United States	10–3	11–2	9–2	12–4	—	4–0

Group C Round Robin Summary Table
Pos.	Country	Belgium	Estonia	Hungary	Philippines	Scotland	Slovakia	Record
5	Belgium	—	6–10	9–4	10–5	5–6	6–7	2–3
4	Estonia	10–6	—	2–13	7–1	1–12	4–8	2–3
2	Hungary	4–9	13–2	—	11–6	3–5	6–3	3–2
6	Philippines	5–10	1–7	6–11	—	1–9	8–3	1–4
1	Scotland	6–5	12–1	5–3	9–1	—	13–1	5–0
3	Slovakia	7–6	8–4	3–6	3–8	1–13	—	2–3

Group D Round Robin Summary Table
Pos.	Country	Greece	Israel	Japan	Norway	South Korea	Switzerland	Record
6	Greece	—	2–10	3–11	2–11	3–7	1–11	0–5
5	Israel	10–2	—	6–7	2–6	9–8	4–8	2–3
3	Japan	11–3	7–6	—	5–7	4–5	2–6	2–3
2	Norway	11–2	6–2	7–5	—	9–3	4–14	4–1
4	South Korea	7–3	8–9	5–4	3–9	—	4–8	2–3
1	Switzerland	11–1	8–4	6–2	14–4	8–4	—	5–0

Group E Round Robin Summary Table
Pos.	Country	Australia	Austria	Finland	France	Sweden	Wales	Record
2	Australia	—	6–7	8–4	7–5	3–7	8–5	3–2
1	Austria	7–6	—	3–6	6–9	8–2	7–5	3–2
5	Finland	4–8	6–3	—	9–3	7–9	1–10	2–3
6	France	5–7	9–6	3–9	—	4–9	1–9	1–4
4	Sweden	7–3	2–8	9–7	9–4	—	5–9	3–2
3	Wales	5–8	5–7	10–1	9–1	9–5	—	3–2

Group F Round Robin Summary Table
Pos.	Country	Czech Republic	Denmark	Germany	Netherlands	New Zealand	Spain	Record
1	Czech Republic	—	10–6	14–2	8–5	7–4	14–0	5–0
4	Denmark	6–10	—	4–6	12–5	6–4	4–5	2–3
2	Germany	2–14	6–4	—	9–3	3–11	8–6	3–2
6	Netherlands	5–8	5–12	3–9	—	6–4	5–6	1–4
5	New Zealand	4–7	4–6	11–3	4–6	—	7–3	2–3
3	Spain	0–14	5–4	6–8	6–5	3–7	—	2–3

=== Playoffs ===
Qualification
8	Hungary	2
9	Norway	8
5	Austria	8
12	Slovenia	11
6	Czech Republic	4
11	Germany	5
7	England	6
10	Australia	8

Quarterfinals
1	United States	7
9	Norway	3
4	Switzerland	7
12	Slovenia	2
3	Scotland	7
11	Germany	5
2	Canada	10
10	Australia	3

Semifinals
1	United States	7
4	Switzerland	6
3	Scotland	6
2	Canada	5

Gold medal game
1	United States	7
3	Scotland	5
Bronze medal game
4	Switzerland	4
2	Canada	7

==== Qualification ====
Friday, May 1, 09:00

Sheet B	1	2	3	4	5	6	7	8	Final
Hungary (Nagy)	0	0	0	1	0	1	X	X	2
Norway (Sagen) 🔨	0	0	3	0	5	0	X	X	8

Sheet C	1	2	3	4	5	6	7	8	Final
Austria (Higatzberger) 🔨	3	1	0	2	0	0	2	0	8
Slovenia (Resman)	0	0	4	0	3	3	0	1	11

Sheet D	1	2	3	4	5	6	7	8	9	Final
Czech Republic (Šik) 🔨	0	1	1	0	0	1	0	1	0	4
Germany (Saile)	0	0	0	2	1	0	1	0	1	5

Sheet E	1	2	3	4	5	6	7	8	Final
England (McGlynn)	0	0	0	0	3	0	3	0	6
Australia (Millikin) 🔨	1	0	2	0	0	3	0	2	8

==== Quarterfinals ====
Friday, May 1, 19:00

Sheet B	1	2	3	4	5	6	7	8	Final
Switzerland (Schwaller) 🔨	0	1	1	3	2	0	X	X	7
Slovenia (Resman)	1	0	0	0	0	1	X	X	2

Sheet C	1	2	3	4	5	6	7	8	Final
United States (Farbelow) 🔨	0	0	0	0	2	2	3	X	7
Norway (Sagen)	0	1	0	2	0	0	0	X	3

Sheet D	1	2	3	4	5	6	7	8	Final
Canada (Korte) 🔨	3	3	1	0	3	0	X	X	10
Australia (Millikin)	0	0	0	1	0	2	X	X	3

Sheet E	1	2	3	4	5	6	7	8	Final
Scotland (Brewster) 🔨	3	0	0	1	0	2	1	0	7
Germany (Saile)	0	2	1	0	1	0	0	1	5

==== Semifinals ====
Saturday, May 2, 09:00

Sheet B	1	2	3	4	5	6	7	8	Final
Scotland (Brewster) 🔨	0	2	0	0	0	0	3	1	6
Canada (Korte)	1	0	1	0	1	2	0	0	5

Sheet E	1	2	3	4	5	6	7	8	Final
United States (Farbelow)	0	2	0	2	0	2	1	0	7
Switzerland (Schwaller) 🔨	2	0	2	0	1	0	0	1	6

==== Bronze medal game ====
Saturday, May 2, 14:00

Sheet D	1	2	3	4	5	6	7	8	Final
Switzerland (Schwaller) 🔨	0	0	2	0	0	2	0	0	4
Canada (Korte)	1	1	0	1	0	0	2	2	7

==== Final ====
Saturday, May 2, 14:00

Sheet C	1	2	3	4	5	6	7	8	Final
United States (Farbelow) 🔨	1	0	2	3	0	1	0	X	7
Scotland (Brewster)	0	1	0	0	2	0	2	X	5

=== Final standings ===
Place	Team
1st place, gold medalist(s)	United States
2nd place, silver medalist(s)	Scotland
3rd place, bronze medalist(s)	Canada
4	Switzerland
5	Norway
5	Australia
5	Germany
5	Slovenia
9	Austria
9	Czech Republic
9	England
9	Hungary
13	Wales
14	Spain
15	Japan
16	Latvia
17	Italy
18	Slovakia
19	Denmark
20	Sweden
21	Ireland
22	Poland
23	South Korea
24	Estonia
25	Finland
26	New Zealand
27	Belgium
28	Israel
29	Hong Kong
30	Nigeria
31	Netherlands
32	Philippines
33	Greece
34	France

== Women ==
=== Teams ===
The teams are listed as follows:

Australia	Canada	Czech Republic	Denmark	England
Skip: Helen Williams; Third: Lynn Hewitt; Second: Kim Irvine; Lead: Carolyn Swan	Skip: Sherry Middaugh; Third: Karri-Lee Grant; Second: Melissa Foster; Lead: Jane Hooper-Perroud	Skip: Jana Beranková; Third: Tereza Lostaková; Second: Vlasta Sikýrová; Lead: Irena Polivková	Skip: Kamilla Schak; Third: Rikke Jensen; Second: Wikie Schurad; Lead: Linette Henningsen; Alternate: Trine Qvist	Skip: Colleen Madonia; Third: Sheilagh MacFarlane; Second: Angela Wilcox; Lead: Janine Wilson
Finland	France	Germany	Hungary	Ireland
Fourth: Janina Lindström; Skip: Mari Wickström; Second: Elina Virtäla; Lead: Riikka Louhivuori	Skip: Françoise Gerbaulet; Third: Cheryl Lobe-Therias; Second: Stephanie Talichet; Lead: Roselyne Boulley-Duparc	Skip: Sabine Belkofer-Kröhnert; Third: Heike Schwaller; Second: Michaela Reilly; Lead: Christina Haller; Alternate: Martina Knobloch	Fourth: Zsuzsanna Pinter; Third: Gyulane Kiss; Skip: Monika Szarvas; Lead: Marta Szabon	Skip: Dale Sinclair; Third: Bernie Gillett; Second: Nina Clancy; Lead: Louise Kerr
Italy	Japan	Lithuania	New Zealand	Norway
Skip: Lucilla Macchiati; Third: Cristina Durando; Second: Daniela Faure Rolland; Lead: Valeria Sacca; Alternate: Barbara Pistolozzi	Skip: Yuka Takimoto; Third: Miyako Yoshimura; Second: Hiromi Takizawa; Lead: Tamami Horiuchi; Alternate: Makiko Uehara	Fourth: Lina Januleviciute; Skip: Asta Vaicekonyte; Second: Gaiva Valatkiene; Lead: Jolanta Sulinskiene; Alternate: Rasa Jasaitiene	Skip: Joanna Olszewski; Third: Sandra Thomas; Second: Elizabeth Matthews; Lead: Merran Anderson; Alternate: Pauline Farra	Skip: Anniken Pettersen; Third: Elin Ingvaldsen; Second: Beate Ruden; Lead: Grethe Brenna
Philippines	Poland	Scotland	Slovenia	South Korea
Skip: Sheila Mariano; Third: Kirsten Dangaran; Second: Cindy McAlister; Lead: Bernie Brewer	Skip: Joanna Erdman; Third: Monika Pietruszka; Second: Beata Szczepanik; Lead: Magdalena Dobiszewska; Alternate: Joanna Blomberg	Skip: Jackie Lockhart; Third: Mairi Milne; Second: Claire Milne; Lead: Katie Loudon	Fourth: Eva Sever; Skip: Alenka Ömerzel; Second: Helena Konobelj; Lead: Brigita Sinigoj; Alternate: Nina Slamnik	Skip: Kim Jae-il; Third: Jeon Nam-hui; Second: Shin So-young; Lead: Kim Eun-jung; Alternate: Soo-jin Ritterling
Sweden	Switzerland	United States		
Skip: Anette Norberg; Third: Cathrine Lindahl; Second: Ulrika Bergman; Lead: Anna Le Moine	Skip: Nicole Strausak; Third: Karin Durtschi; Second: Karin Lüthi; Lead: Sandra Born	Fourth: Norma O'Leary; Skip: Margie Smith; Second: Shelly Kinney; Lead: Shelly Kosal		

=== Round Robin Standings ===
Final Round Robin Standings

Key
Teams to Playoffs

Group A	Skip	W	L	W–L	DSC
Canada	Sherry Middaugh	4	0	–	23.929
Sweden	Anette Norberg	3	1	–	17.943
Finland	Mari Wickström	2	2	–	75.114
Philippines	Sheila Mariano	1	3	–	102.900
Slovenia	Alenka Ömerzel	0	4	–	156.000

Group B	Skip	W	L	W–L	DSC
Scotland	Jackie Lockhart	5	0	–	47.943
United States	Margie Smith	4	1	–	85.071
Norway	Anniken Pettersen	2	3	1–0	65.200
England	Colleen Madonia	2	3	0–1	49.400
France	Françoise Gerbaulet	1	4	1–0	99.714
South Korea	Kim Jae-il	1	4	0–1	86.657

Group C	Skip	W	L	W–L	DSC
Japan	Yuka Takimoto	5	0	–	39.357
Lithuania	Asta Vaicekonyte	4	1	–	89.429
Australia	Helen Williams	3	2	–	125.771
Poland	Joanna Erdman	2	3	–	91.929
Hungary	Monika Szarvas	1	4	–	76.557
Denmark	Kamilla Schak	0	5	–	123.057

Group D	Skip	W	L	W–L	DSC
Germany	Sabine Belkofer-Kröhnert	5	0	–	59.886
Switzerland	Nicole Strausak	4	1	–	57.743
Ireland	Dale Sinclair	3	2	–	57.414
Czech Republic	Jana Beranková	2	3	–	89.300
Italy	Lucilla Macchiati	1	4	–	137.457
New Zealand	Joanna Olszewski	0	5	–	130.071

Group A Round Robin Summary Table
Pos.	Country	Canada	Finland	Philippines	Slovenia	Sweden	Record
1	Canada	—	7–4	10–1	10–1	7–4	4–0
3	Finland	4–7	—	7–2	10–1	3–7	2–2
4	Philippines	1–10	2–7	—	6–4	4–6	1–3
5	Slovenia	1–10	1–10	4–6	—	2–13	0–4
2	Sweden	4–7	7–3	6–4	13–2	—	3–1

Group B Round Robin Summary Table
Pos.	Country	England	France	Norway	Scotland	South Korea	United States	Record
4	England	—	6–2	4–8	4–6	9–5	3–8	2–3
5	France	2–6	—	5–11	0–12	7–4	3–8	1–4
3	Norway	8–4	11–5	—	1–11	7–10	4–12	2–3
1	Scotland	6–4	12–0	11–1	—	13–1	7–3	5–0
6	South Korea	5–9	4–7	10–7	1–13	—	4–8	1–4
2	United States	8–3	8–3	12–4	3–7	8–4	—	4–1

Group C Round Robin Summary Table
Pos.	Country	Australia	Denmark	Hungary	Japan	Lithuania	Poland	Record
3	Australia	—	9–3	8–7	2–5	2–3	6–4	3–2
6	Denmark	3–9	—	5–7	2–11	5–14	5–12	0–5
5	Hungary	7–8	7–5	—	4–8	4–8	6–8	1–4
1	Japan	5–2	11–2	8–4	—	4–2	10–3	5–0
2	Lithuania	3–2	14–5	8–4	2–4	—	8–4	4–1
4	Poland	4–6	12–5	8–6	3–10	4–8	—	2–3

Group D Round Robin Summary Table
Pos.	Country	Czech Republic	Germany		Italy	New Zealand	Switzerland	Record
4	Czech Republic	—	5–6	7–13	8–3	7–3	1–10	2–3
1	Germany	6–5	—	6–5	9–3	11–3	6–4	5–0
3	Ireland	13–7	5–6	—	8–2	9–4	5–8	3–2
5	Italy	3–8	3–9	2–8	—	10–6	1–12	1–4
6	New Zealand	3–7	3–11	4–9	6–10	—	1–10	0–5
2	Switzerland	10–1	4–6	8–5	12–1	10–1	—	4–1

=== Playoffs ===
Quarterfinals
1	Canada	8
8	Lithuania	1
4	Germany	7
5	Sweden	2
3	Scotland	5
6	Switzerland	3
2	Japan	5
7	United States	6

Semifinals
1	Canada	1
4	Germany	4
3	Scotland	12
7	United States	2

Gold medal game
4	Germany	1
3	Scotland	10
Bronze medal game
1	Canada	8
7	United States	1

==== Quarterfinals ====
Friday, May 1, 14:00

Sheet B	1	2	3	4	5	6	7	8	Final
Canada (Middaugh) 🔨	3	0	0	2	1	2	X	X	8
Lithuania (Vaicekonyte)	0	0	1	0	0	0	X	X	1

Sheet C	1	2	3	4	5	6	7	8	Final
Germany (Belkofer-Kröhnert) 🔨	0	3	0	1	1	0	2	X	7
Sweden (Norberg)	0	0	1	0	0	1	0	X	2

Sheet D	1	2	3	4	5	6	7	8	Final
Scotland (Lockhart) 🔨	0	1	0	0	1	0	2	1	5
Switzerland (Strausak)	0	0	1	1	0	1	0	0	3

Sheet E	1	2	3	4	5	6	7	8	Final
Japan (Takimoto) 🔨	0	0	3	0	1	0	1	0	5
United States (Smith)	0	1	0	3	0	1	0	1	6

==== Semifinals ====
Saturday, May 2, 09:00

Sheet C	1	2	3	4	5	6	7	8	Final
Scotland (Lockhart) 🔨	1	3	0	2	2	4	X	X	12
United States (Smith)	0	0	2	0	0	0	X	X	2

Sheet D	1	2	3	4	5	6	7	8	Final
Canada (Middaugh) 🔨	0	0	1	0	0	0	0	X	1
Germany (Belkofer-Kröhnert)	1	0	0	1	0	1	1	X	4

==== Bronze medal game ====
Saturday, May 2, 14:00

Sheet E	1	2	3	4	5	6	7	8	Final
Canada (Middaugh) 🔨	1	3	0	0	3	1	X	X	8
United States (Smith)	0	0	1	0	0	0	X	X	1

==== Final ====
Saturday, May 2, 14:00

Sheet B	1	2	3	4	5	6	7	8	Final
Germany (Belkofer-Kröhnert)	0	0	0	1	0	0	X	X	1
Scotland (Lockhart) 🔨	1	3	2	0	1	3	X	X	10

=== Final standings ===
Place	Team
1st place, gold medalist(s)	Scotland
2nd place, silver medalist(s)	Germany
3rd place, bronze medalist(s)	Canada
4	United States
5	Japan
5	Sweden
5	Switzerland
5	Lithuania
9	Ireland
10	Norway
11	Finland
12	Australia
13	England
14	Czech Republic
15	Poland
16	Philippines
17	Hungary
18	France
19	Italy
20	Slovenia
21	South Korea
22	Denmark
23	New Zealand
