= Alberte Ebler =

Danish handball player (born 2003)

Personal information
- Nationality: Danish
- Born: 16 January 2003 (age 23) Aarhus, Denmark
- Height: 1.78 m (5 ft 10 in)

Sport
- Sport: Handball
- Position: Right back
- Current club: Fredrikstad BK
- Number: 21

Youth career
- Years: Team
- 2018–2020: Skanderborg Håndbold

Senior clubs
- Years: Team
- 2020–2021: Skanderborg Håndbold
- 2021–2023: Ikast Håndbold
- 2023–2025: Aarhus United
- 2025–: Fredrikstad BK

Alberte Ebler (born 16 January 2003) is a Danish handball player who plays for Fredrikstad BK in Norway.

On 8 May 2025, she signed a two-year contract with Fredrikstad BK in the Elkjøp-ligaen. She has previously played for Skanderborg Håndbold, Ikast Håndbold and Aarhus United.

In June 2022, Ebler was also included a development squad for future national handball players on the Danish national teaam, among nine others. She also represented the Danish national youth team at the 2022 IHF Women's U20 Handball World Championship in Slovenia, placing 5th.

== Achievements ==
- Damehåndboldligaen:
  - Bronze medalist: 2022
- EHF European League:
  - Semifinalist: 2022
