= Camilla Maibom =

Danish handball player (born 1990)

Personal information
- Full name: Camilla Lefoli Maibom
- Nationality: Danish
- Born: 5 July 1990 (age 36) Svendborg, Denmark
- Height: 1.65 m (5 ft 5 in)

Sport
- Sport: Handball
- Position: Centre Back
- Number: 3

Senior clubs
- Years: Team
- 2008-2010: Odense Håndbold
- 2010-2014: Nykøbing Falster
- 2014-2016: Silkeborg-Voel
- 2016-2018: Ringkøbing Håndbold
- 2018: Siófok KC
- 2018: Ringkøbing Håndbold

Camilla Lefoli Maibom (born 5 July 1990) is a Danish retired handball player who last played for Ringkøbing Håndbold.
