= Stephanie Christensen =

Danish handball player (born 1992)

Personal information
- Full name: Stephanie Andersen
- Nationality: Danish
- Born: 19 June 1992 (age 34) Randers, Denmark
- Height: 1.86 m (6 ft 1 in)

Sport
- Sport: Handball
- Position: Goalkeeper
- Current club: Ringkøbing Håndbold
- Number: 16

Senior clubs
- Years: Team
- 2009–2012: Randers HK
- 2012–2016: FC Midtjylland Håndbold
- 2016–2019: Silkeborg-Voel KFUM
- 2019–2020: Bjerringbro FH
- 2020–2021: HH Elite
- 2021–2022: Randers HK
- 2022–2023: Ikast Håndbold
- 2023–: Ringkøbing Håndbold

Stephanie Christensen (born 19 June 1992) is a Danish handball player who currently plays for Ringkøbing Håndbold.

She won the Danish League in 2015 with FCM Håndbold, beating Team Esbjerg in the final.

Previously, she has featured in the Danish youth national teams.
