= Anna Sophie Okkels =

Danish handball player (born 1990)

Personal information
- Full name: Anna Sophie Linde Okkels
- Nationality: Danish
- Born: 23 March 1990 (age 36) Aarhus, Denmark
- Height: 1.78 m (5 ft 10 in)

Sport
- Sport: Handball
- Position: Left back
- Current club: Silkeborg-Voel KFUM
- Number: 23

Senior clubs
- Years: Team
- 2007-2008: Brabrand IF
- 2008-2010: SK Aarhus
- 2010-2012: Randers HK
- 2012-2017: SK Aarhus
- 2017-2018: Silkeborg-Voel KFUM
National team
Years	Team	Apps	(Gls)
2007-2017	Denmark	39	(48)
Medal record
IHF Youth World Championship
Bronze medal – third place	2008 Slovakia

Anna Sophie Linde Okkels (born 23 March 1990) is a Danish former handball, who last played for Silkeborg-Voel KFUM and the Danish national team until 2017.

She participated at the 2015 World Women's Handball Championship.

In the 2008-09 edition of the Danish Handball Cup she was named the MVP. Despite that she and SK Aarhus only came second, losing to FCK Håndbold in the final.
