= Mathilda Lundström =

Swedish handball player (born 1996)

Personal information
- Nationality: Swedish
- Born: 20 December 1996 (age 29) Stockholm, Sweden
- Height: 1.64 m (5 ft 5 in)

Sport
- Sport: Handball
- Position: Right wing
- Current club: Skara HF

Youth career
- Years: Team
- –2010: Skogås HK

Senior clubs
- Years: Team
- 2010–2014: Huddinge HK
- 2014–2016: Spårvägens HF
- 2016–2020: Skuru IK
- 2020–2022: IK Sävehof
- 2022–2024: Silkeborg-Voel
- 2024–2026: HH Elite
- 2026-: Skara HF
National team
Years	Team	Apps	(Gls)
2018–	Sweden	88	(128)

Mathilda Lundström (born 20 December 1996) is a Swedish handball player for Skara HF and the Swedish national team.

== Achievements ==
- Swedish Championship:
  - Winner: 2022
