= June Bøttger =

Norwegian handball player (born 1994)

Personal information
- Nationality: Norwegian
- Born: 2 June 1994 (age 32)
- Height: 1.66 m (5 ft 5 in)

Sport
- Sport: Handball
- Position: Left wing
- Current club: SønderjyskE
- Number: 17

Senior clubs
- Years: Team
- 2011–2017: Oppsal
- 2017–2024: Aarhus United
- 2024–2026: SønderjyskE
- 2026–: Fredrikstad BK

June Bøttger (born 2 June 1994) is a Norwegian handball player, who plays for SønderjyskE in Denmark. She signed for Aarhus United in 2017, and signed an extended deal in 2019. In 2018 the fan club of Aarhus United awarded her with their player of the year award.

She has played for the Norwegian national recruit team.
