= Louise Kristensen =

Danish handball player (born 1992)

Personal information
- Full name: Louise Kristensen
- Nationality: Danish
- Born: 4 September 1992 (age 34) Brabrand, Denmark
- Height: 1.74 m (5 ft 9 in)

Sport
- Sport: Handball
- Position: Right wing
- Current club: Aarhus United
- Number: 2

Senior clubs
- Years: Team
- 2009–2011: Aalborg DH
- 2011–2013: SønderjyskE Håndbold
- 2013–2016: HC Odense
- 2016–2017: Nykøbing Falster HK
- 2017–2018: Aarhus United
Medal record
European Junior Championship
Gold medal – first place	2011 Netherlands
European Youth Championship
Gold medal – first place	2009 Serbia

Louise Kristensen (born 4 September 1992) is a Danish former handball player who last played for Aarhus United.
