= Emma Friberg =

Swedish handball player (born 1992)

Personal information
- Full name: Emma Friberg
- Nationality: Swedish
- Born: 21 December 1992 (age 33) Lund, Sweden
- Height: 1.74 m (5 ft 9 in)

Sport
- Sport: Handball
- Position: Goalkeeper
- Current club: Retired

Youth career
- Years: Team
- –: Kävlinge HK
- –: Eslövs IK

Senior clubs
- Years: Team
- 2006-2008: KFUM Lundagård
- 2008-2012: H43/Lundagård
- 2013-2016: Lugi HF
- 2016-2018: Ringkøbing
- 2018-2020: EH Aalborg
- 2020-2022: Viborg HK
- 2022-2023: Skanderborg Håndbold
- 2025: Team Esbjerg

Emma Friberg (born 21 December 1992) is a Swedish former handball goalkeeper.
