= Julie Gantzel Pedersen =

Danish handball player (born 1994)

Julie Gantzel
Personal information
- Full name: Julie Horslund Gantzel Pedersen
- Nationality: Danish
- Born: 13 April 1994 (age 32) Ikast, Denmark
- Height: 1.73 m (5 ft 8 in)

Sport
- Sport: Handball
- Position: Line Player
- Current club: Ikast Håndbold
- Number: 13

Youth career
- Years: Team
- 2009–2010: FC Midtjylland

Senior clubs
- Years: Team
- 2012–2013: FC Midtjylland
- 2013–2016: Halden HK
- 2016–2017: Ringkøbing Håndbold
- 2017–2020: Herning-Ikast Håndbold
- 2020–2021: HH Elite
- 2021–2022: Holstebro Håndbold
- 2022–2023: Ikast Håndbold

Julie Gantzel (born 13 April 1994) is a Danish handballer who plays for Ikast Håndbold.
