= Josephine Touray =

Danish handball player (born 1979)

Personal information
- Nationality: Danish
- Born: 10 June 1979 (age 47) Aarhus, Denmark
- Height: 165 cm (65 in)
- Weight: 57 kg (126 lb)

Sport
- Sport: Handball
- Position: Right wing

Senior clubs
- Years: Team
- 1997–1998: Viborg
- 1998–2003: Kolding
- 2003–2005: Ikast-Bording
- 2005–2008: København
- 2008–2010: Aarhus
- 2010–2012: Frederiksberg
- 2013: København
National team
Years	Team	Apps	(Gls)
2001–2008	Denmark	123	(383)
Medal record
Women's handball
Representing Denmark
Olympic Games
Gold medal – first place	2004 Athens	Team competition
European Championship
Gold medal – first place	2002 Denmark	Team
Silver medal – second place	2004 Hungary	Team

Josephine Touray (born 6 October 1979) is a Danish former team handball player and Olympic champion of Gambian descent. She played mainly as a right wing. Over the course of her career she played 123 games for the Danish national team, where she scored 383 goals. She played for the clubs: Bjerringbro KFUM, Viborg HK, KIF Kolding, Ikast-Bording EH, FCK Håndbold, Frederiksberg IF and SK Aarhus, all in Denmark. She received a gold medal with the Danish national team at the 2004 Summer Olympics in Athens.

== Career ==
Touray started her playing career at Bjerringbro before joining the Danish top club Viborg HK. Here she won the Danish league and the EHF-Cup in 1999.

In 2004 with Ikast-Bording EH she won the EHF Cup Winners' Cup.

In 2005 she joined FC København Håndbold to better balance the handball career with her law-studies. In April 2008 she decided to cancel her contract with FC København Håndbold, due to concerns over playing time. At the time of the transfer, she had not taken the field since October 2007. She joined league rivals SK Århus.

She decided to retire in 2009 after struggling with injuries for a long period. In 2010 she did however come out of retirement to join Copenhagen based Frederiksberg IF, where she played as a part time handballer.

== Post-handball career ==
Simultaneously with her playing career, Touray studied Law. After she retired she has been involved in various charity organisation. First in FANT – Football for a new tomorrow, an organisation supporting sports in developing countries and Hej-Fonden, an organisation against bullying, which has involved numerous former and current Danish handball players, including Mikkel Hansen and Mie Højlund.
