= Anne Brinch-Nielsen =

Danish handball player (born 1997)

Personal information
- Nationality: Danish
- Born: 3 May 1997 (age 29) Aarhus, Denmark
- Height: 1.74 m (5 ft 9 in)

Sport
- Sport: Handball
- Position: Right Wing
- Current club: EH Aalborg
- Number: 34

Youth career
- Years: Team
- 2012-2016: Team Esbjerg

Senior clubs
- Years: Team
- 2016-2017: Fredericia HK
- 2017-2018: Team Esbjerg
- 2018-: EH Aalborg
National team
- Years: Team
- –: Denmark (Junior)
Medal record
European Youth Olympic Festival
Gold medal – first place	2013 Utrecht

Anne Brinch-Nielsen (born 3 May 1997) is a Danish handball player who currently plays for EH Aalborg.

== Achievements ==
- Danish Handball Cup:
  - Winner: 2017
