= Fredrikstad BK =

Norwegian handball club

- Full name: Fredrikstad Ballklubb
- Founded: 12 September, 2001
- Arena: Installatøren Arena
- Capacity: 1,500
- President: Atle Engsmyr
- Head coach: Heine Eriksen
- League: REMA 1000-ligaen
- 2025–26: 6th
- Club colours
Home	Away

Fredrikstad Ballklubb (also known as Fredrikstad Bkl.) is a handball club from Fredrikstad, Østfold, Norway. The women's team currently competes in Eliteserien, the top division since its promotion in 2017.

== History ==
The club was founded on September 12th 2001 as a merge between the clubs Torp Idrætsforening og Lisleby Håndball. They started in the 1st division (second tier) under the name Torp/Lisleby in the 2000/01-season. From 2001/02 onwards they played under their current name. Their first promotion to the top division came in the 2003/04-season, but they were relegated the following season.

== Team ==
=== Current squad ===
Squad for the 2026-27 season

Goalkeeper

- 1 (Norway) Tora Tande-Elton
- 16 (Norway) Vilde Tornes Finneide
- 99 (Norway) Kristin Nagel Gravning

Wingers
LW

- 30 (Norway) Malene Hansen Tangen
- 00 (Norway) June Bøttger

RW

- 21 (Norway) Maren Hansen Tangen
- 27 (Norway) Magdele Kvarving Sandtrø

Line players

- 3 (Norway) Helga Pedersen Lersveen
- 18 (Norway) Kristin Dorthea Eskerud
- 19 (Norway) Oda Bekker Olsen
- 40 (Norway) Sanna Bergli Jauert

Back players
LB

- 7 (Norway) Sofia Shauri Dalsveen
- 10 (Norway) Thea Andresen
- 33 (Norway) Runa Heimsjø Sand
- 45 (Norway) Regine Nekstad

CB

- 2 (Norway) Zara Johnsson Solberg
- 15 (Norway) Maja Borkovskaja-Andreassen
- 49 (Norway) Kaja Ørving Eriksen

RB

- 28 (Norway) Julie Ellingsen
- 77 (Denmark) Alberte Ebler

=== Transfers ===
Transfers for the 2026–27 season

Joining

- (Norway) Vilde Tornes Finneide (GK) (from (Norway) Oppsal Håndball)
- (Norway) Tora Tande-Elton (GK) (from (Norway) Follo HK Damer)
- (Norway) Runa Heimsjø Sand (LB) (from (Norway) Molde Elite)
- (Norway) June Bøttger (LW) (from (Denmark) SønderjyskE)
- (Norway) Regine Nekstad (from own rows)
- (Norway) Oda Bekker Olsen (from own rows)
- (Norway) Helga Pedersen Lersveen (from (Norway) Volda)

Leaving

- (Denmark) Mathilde Berner Rømer (GK) (to (Denmark) HØJ Elite)
- (Norway) Hanne Ramsøskar Sagvold (GK) (retires)
- (Denmark) Maja Eiberg (CB) (to (France) Toulon Métropole Var Handball)
- (Norway) Anniken Monsen (CB) (Norway) Fyllingen IL)
- (Norway) Hanna Blystad (LW) (to (Norway) Byåsen HE)
- (Norway) Martine Guterud Helland (P) (retires)

=== Technical staff ===
- Head coach: (Denmark) Heine Eriksen
- Assistant coach: (Norway) Gjøril Anett Johnsson Solberg

== Notable former National Team players ==
- (Iceland) Berglind Íris Hansdóttir
- (Norway) Anette Hovind Johansen
- (Norway) Kari Brattset (2011–2014)
- (Norway) Thale Rushfeldt Deila (2018–2021)
- (Norway) Live Rushfeldt Deila (2019–2021)
- (Norway) Selma Henriksen (2018–2025)

== Notable former club players ==
- (Norway) Kathrine Storkås
- (Norway) Emilie Wernersen
- (Norway) Martine Hovden
- (Norway) Katharina Steinsvik Olsen
- (Norway) Kine Kristiansen
- (Norway) Linn Mangset
- (Norway) Kamilla Røed Érsek
- (Norway) Thea Emilie Berg
- (Norway) Lisa Forsberg Bernhardsen
- (Norway) Malene Staal
- (Norway) Marianne Storkås
- (Norway) Tina Bjerke
- (Norway) Anett Andersen
- (Norway) Cristina Pozo Helmersen
- (Norway) Ida Marie Wernersen
- (Norway) Martine Moen (2017–2019)
- (Norway) Dorthe Groa
- (Norway) Anette Helene Hansen
- (Norway) Nora Lande Thulin
- (Norway) Hedda Lande Thulin
- (Norway) Thea Øby-Olsen
- (Norway) Ida Marie Kallhovd
- (Norway) Maja Muri
- (Norway) Andrea Rønning
- (Norway) Candy Jabateh
- (Norway) Runa Heimsjø Sand
- (Norway) Ingeborg Furunes
- (Norway) Benedicte Frøland Nesdal
- (Norway) Julie Hulleberg
- (Norway) Karoline Elise Syversen
- (Norway) Hedda Lauvås Aasen
- (Norway) Hanne Ramsøskar Sagvold
- (Norway) Andrea Varvin Fredriksen
- (Norway) Sanne Løkka Hagen
- (Norway) Frida Brandbu Andersen
- (Norway) Sara Eline Laurtizen
- (Norway) Hanne Ramsøskar Sagvold
- (Norway) Hanna Blystad
- (Norway) Martine Guterud Helland
- (Brazil) Caroline Martins
- (Denmark) Hanne Frandsen
- (Denmark) Pernille Huldgaard Christensen
- (Denmark) / (Switzerland) Melanie Felber
- (Denmark) Mathilde Berner Rømer
- (Denmark) Maja Eiberg
- (Hungary) Gabriella Juhász
- (Sweden) Karin Carlsson
- (Sweden) Linnea Arrhenius
- (Sweden) Louise Karlsson (2016–2019)
- (Sweden) Jenny Caroline Sandgren

== Statistics ==
=== Top scorers in EHF European League ===
Last updated on 22 February 2025

Rank	Name	Seasons played	Goals
1	(Norway) Maja Eiberg	1	37
2	(Norway) Selma Henriksen	1	27
2	(Norway) Frida Brandbu Andersen	1	27
4	(Norway) Magdele Sandtrø	1	26
5	(Norway) Sofia Shauri Dahlsveen	1	25
5	(Norway) Hanna Blystad	1	25
7	(Norway) Zara Johnsson Solberg	1	21
8	(Norway) Kristin Eskerud	1	16
9	(Norway) Sara Eline Lauritzen	1	11
10	(Norway) Sanne Løkka Hagen	1	7

== European record ==
Season	Competition	Round	Club	1st leg	2nd leg	Aggregate
2024–25	EHF European League	R2	(Switzerland) GC Amicitia Zürich	33–21	28–20	61–41
2024–25	EHF European League	R3	—	—	—	W.O.
2024–25	EHF European League	Group Matches; Group D	(Spain) BM Bera Bera	26–32	33–24	3rd place
2024–25	EHF European League	Group Matches; Group D	(Germany) HSG Bensheim-Auerbach	28–39	30–32	3rd place
2024–25	EHF European League	Group Matches; Group D	(France) Paris 92	28–26	28–29	3rd place
