= Ditte Vind =

Danish handball player (born 1994)

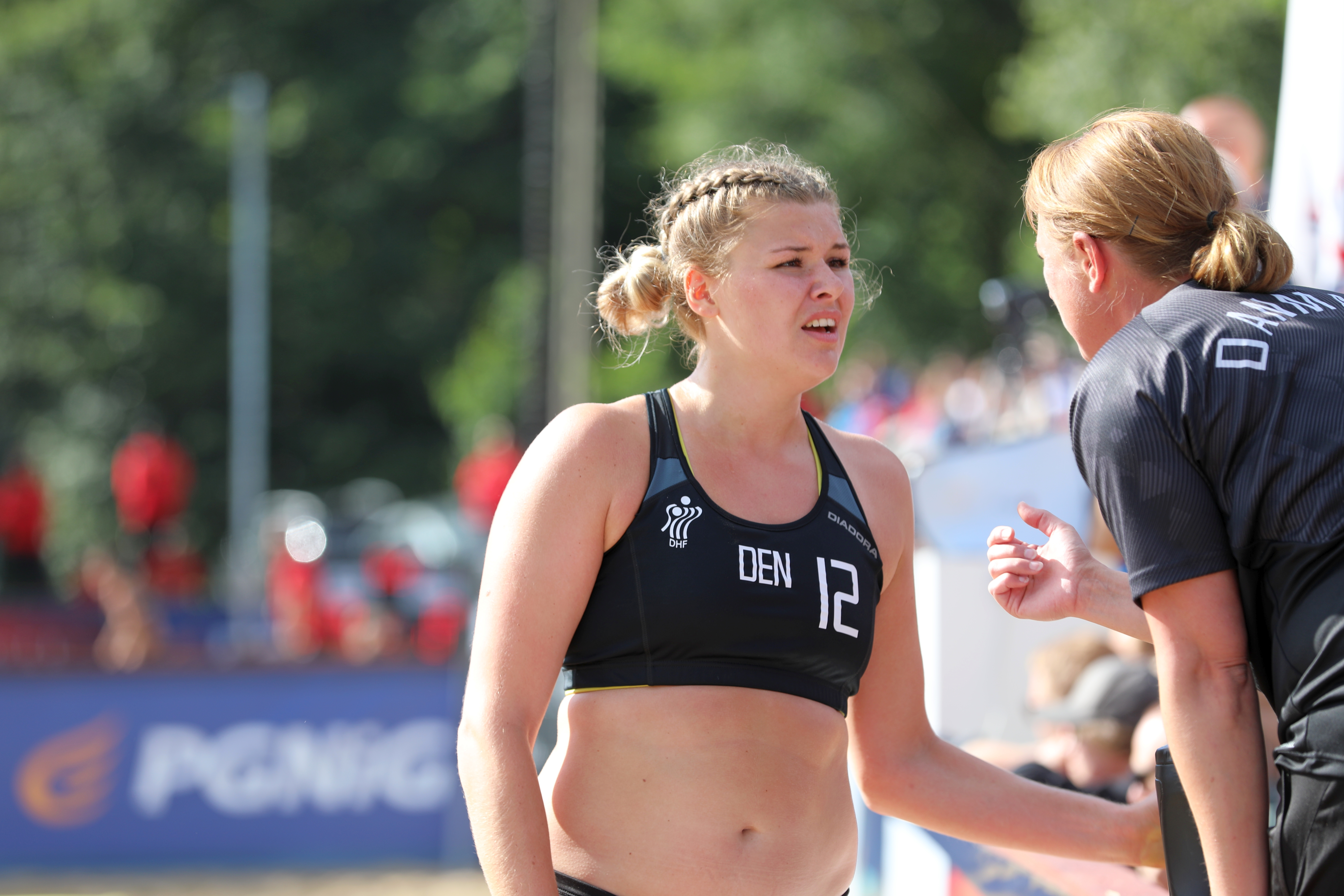

Personal information
- Full name: Ditte Folden Vind
- Nationality: Danish
- Born: 2 January 1994 (age 32) Odense, Denmark
- Height: 1.87 m (6 ft 2 in)

Sport
- Sport: Handball
- Position: Goalkeeper
- Current club: Ajax København
- Number: 16

Senior clubs
- Years: Team
- 2013-2016: Odense Håndbold
- 2016-2017: Nykøbing Falster
- 2017-2019: Aarhus United
- 2019-2021: Holstebro Håndbold
- 2021-2022: Fleury Loiret HB
- 2023-: Ajax København
National team
Years	Team	Apps	(Gls)
2019-	Denmark beach	17	(2)
Medal record
Women's Team handball
Representing Denmark
IHF Junior World Championship
Bronze medal – third place	2014 Croatia
European Junior Championship
Bronze medal – third place	2013 Denmark
Women's Beach handball
Representing Denmark
World Championships
Silver medal – second place	2026 Croatia
European Championship
Gold medal – first place	2019 Stare Jabłonki

Ditte Vind (born 2 January 1994) is a Danish handball player who currently plays for Ajax København and the Denmark national beach team.

She was a part of the Women's EHF Beach Handball EURO 2023 All-star Team as the goalkeeper. Denmark finished 7th at the tournament.

== Achievements ==
- Danish Cup
  - Bronze Medalist: 2017
- Damehåndboldligaen
  - Winner: 2017
