= Kristina Jørgensen =

Danish handball player (born 1998)

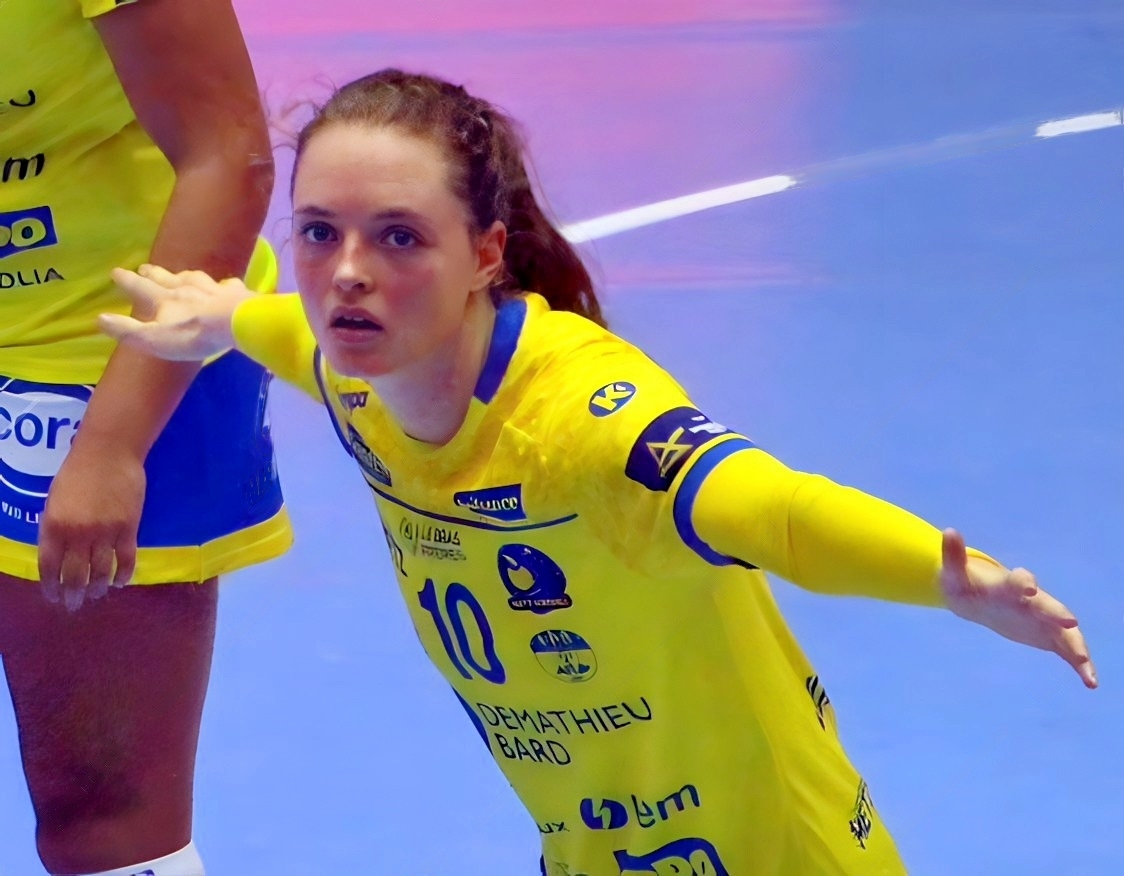

Personal information
- Nationality: Danish
- Born: 17 January 1998 (age 28) Horsens, Denmark
- Height: 1.86 m (6 ft 1 in)

Sport
- Sport: Handball
- Position: Centre back
- Current club: Metz Handball
- Number: 18

Youth career
- Years: Team
- 2004–2014: Horsens HK
- 2014–2016: Skanderborg Håndbold

Senior clubs
- Years: Team
- 2016–2017: Skanderborg Håndbold
- 2017–2022: Viborg HK
- 2022–2024: Metz Handball
- 2024–2026: Győri ETO KC
- 2026–: Metz Handball
National team
Years	Team	Apps	(Gls)
2017–	Denmark	153	(467)
Medal record
Olympic Games
Bronze medal – third place	2024 Paris	Team
World Championship
Bronze medal – third place	2021 Spain
Bronze medal – third place	2023 Denmark/Norway/Sweden
European Championship
Silver medal – second place	2022 Slovenia/North Macedonia/Montenegro
Silver medal – second place	2024 Austria/Hungary/Switzerland
Youth World Championship
Silver medal – second place	2016 Slovakia
Junior European Championship
Bronze medal – third place	2017 Slovenia
Youth European Championship
Gold medal – first place	2015 U-17 Macedonia
- Updated on 12 April 2026

Kristina Jørgensen (born 18 January 1998) is a Danish handball player for Metz Handball and the Danish national team.

== Club career ==
Jørgensen started playing handball for her hometown club Horsens HK, before joining Skanderborg Håndbold, where she made her senior debut.

She became a top league player, when she was promoted with her club Skanderborg Håndbold in her first senior season. After impressing in the following season, where she was the club's top scorer with 113 goals in the 2016–17 season, she signed with Danish top club Viborg HK. She was initially on a two-year contract, which was extended despite offers from other Danish clubs. In the 2020-21 season she was the top scorer in the ordinary season with 180 goals.

In January 2022, she signed with the French club Metz Handball. At this club, she has won both the French cup and the LFH Division 1 Féminine.

In 2024 she signed for Hungarian Győri ETO KC. Here she won the 2025 Hungarian Championship and the EHF Champions League in her first season.

=== National team ===
Jørgensen won gold medals at the 2015 U-17 World Championship in Macedonia, silver medals at the 2016 U-18 World Championship in Slovakia and bronze medals at the 2017 U-19 European Championship in Slovenia. At the U-19 European Championship, she was named MVP.

She made her debut for the Danish national team on 25 November 2017. A month later she played at the 2017 World Women's Handball Championship, where Denmark finished 6th.

A year later she played at the 2018 European Championship.

At the 2020 European Championship she finished 4th with Denmark, losing to Norway in the semifinal and Croatia in the third place playoff. During the tournament she scored 21 goals.

She won her first medals with Denmark, when they took bronze medals at the 2021 World Championship, beating Spain in the third place playoff.

A year later she won silver medals at the 2022 European Championship, when Denmark lost to Norway in the final. Jørgensen scored 14 goals during the tournament.

At the 2023 World Championship she won another bronze medal. With 47 goals Jørgensen was the joint 3rd best goalscorer at the tournament, tied with Romanian Eliza Buceschi and Dutch Angela Malestein.

At the 2024 Olympics she won another bronze medals. Later the same year, she won silver medals at the 2024 European Championship, losing to Norway in the final.

At the 2025 World Women's Handball Championship Denmark went out in the quarterfinal to France after winning all matches in the group stages. The Danish team was affected by a lot of players missing the tournament including goalkeepers Sandra Toft and Althea Reinhardt and pivots Sarah Iversen and Rikke Iversen. This was the first time since 2019 that Denmark left a major international tournament without any medals. In the quarterfinal against France Jørgensen was the Danish top scorer with 11 goals.

== Achievements ==
- EHF Champions League:
  - Winner: 2025
- Youth World Championship:
  - Silver Medalist: 2016
- European Youth Championship:
  - Winner: 2015
- Junior European Championship:
  - Silver Medalist: 2017

== Individual awards ==
- MVP of the EHF European Under-19 Championship: 2017
- Best Defender of the EHF U-17 European Championship: 2015
- All-Star Left back of Damehåndboldligaen: 2019-20, 2020-21
- Youth player of the Year in Damehåndboldligaen: 2017/18
- Top Scorer of the EHF European League with 72 goals: 2022
- Top scorer and top assister in the Damehåndboldligaen: 2020-21 with 269 goals and 147 assists
