= SK Aarhus =

Danish handball club

Sportsklub Aarhus
- Short name: SK Aarhus
- Founded: 2000
- Dissolved: 2017
- Arena: Viljen Til Sejren Arena
- Capacity: 1,152
- League: Primo Tours Ligaen
- 2016–17: 9th
- Club colours
Home	Away

Sportsklub Aarhus was a Danish women's handball club based in Aarhus. They played in Damehåndboldligaen when the team closed after the 2016-17 season because of financial issues. Aarhus United took over their licence for the league. SK Aarhus has previously also included basketball and volleyball.

== History ==
The club was founded in 2000.

SK Aarhus had consistently been at the bottom of Damehåndboldligaen and were relegated to 1. division after the 2004-05 season. They were, however, promoted again after just one season. Later, the club strengthened their roster with the likes of Karin Mortensen, Josephine Touray and Trine Troelsen, and this resulted in a playoff place and fourth place after three matches against FCK Håndbold in the 2008-09 season.

During the 17 years the club existed they had consistently trouble with finding sponsors, and thus often were in financial trouble. On 30 November 2009, it was revealed that SK Aarhus had gone into receivership and that they had a deadline of 15 January 2010 to find a solution This got a few of the club's investors to stop in the club at the turn of 2009-10. Although they managed to raise money to keep the club going, they failed to get over the economic problems and after the 2010-11 season, many of their big profiles such as Susann Müller, Marta Tomac and Gitte Brøgger Led left the club. The team started the following season on an even smaller budget, but in November 2011, the management decided to take steps against dissolving the club when the then investors didn't want to increase the support. Subsequently a group of investors secured the club's future which resulted in the continuation of the club

In the 2011-12 season, SK Aarhus was relegated after an 8th place in the league and a 3rd place in the qualifying group. In the 2013-14 season, SK Aarhus returned to the league after gaining a 2nd place in the league and winning 2–0 against Nykøbing Falster Håndboldklub. In 2017 it was announced that SK Aarhus would close after the 2016-17 season and that the newly formed Aarhus United would take over their league licence.

== Team ==
=== Current squad ===
Squad for the 2016–17 season

Goalkeepers

- 1 (Denmark) Mathilde Juncker
- 12 (Denmark) Lærke Sørensen
- 16 (Denmark) Anne-Sofie Ernstrøm

Wingers
LW

- 11 (Denmark) Trine Leth
- 18 (Denmark) Malene Gandrup

RW

- 17 (Denmark) Charlotte Mikkelsen
- 19 (Denmark) Anne Tolstrup

Line players

- 21 (Denmark) Majbritt Toft Hansen
- 29 (Denmark) Camilla Fangel

Back players
LB

- 20 (Denmark) Anne Sofie Hjort
- 23 (Denmark) Anna Sophie Okkels

CB

- 2 (Denmark) Amalie Jacobsen
- 7 (Denmark) Emma Mogensen
- 15 (Denmark) Julie Pontoppidan

RB

- 4 (Denmark) Lærke Christensen
- 14 (Denmark) Mette Tranborg

== Notable former players ==
Name	Nationality	Years
Gitte Brøgger Led	Denmark	2005–2011
Iwona Niedźwiedź	Poland	2007–2010
Trine Troelsen	Denmark	2007–2009
Maibritt Kviesgaard	Denmark	2009–2010
Karin Mortensen	Denmark	2009–2010
Marta Tomac	Norway	2010–2011
Susann Müller	Germany	2010–2011
Pearl van der Wissel	Netherlands	2011–2012
Mette Tranborg	Denmark	2012–2017
Anna Sophie Okkels	Denmark	2012–2017
Maja Grønbæk	Denmark	2001–2005
Choi Im-jeong	South Korea	2007–2010
Huh Soon-young	South Korea	

== Seasons ==
Season	Group stage	Playoff	European qualification	League	Notes
2000/01	10	not qualified	not qualified	Håndboldligaen	
2001/02	8	not qualified	not qualified	Håndboldligaen	
2002/03	10	not qualified	not qualified	Håndboldligaen	
2003/04	9	not qualified	Cup Winners' Cup	Håndboldligaen	
2004/05	11	not qualified	not qualified	Håndboldligaen	Relegated
2005/06	1	not qualified	not qualified	1st Division	Promoted
2006/07	10	not qualified	not qualified	Håndboldligaen	
2007/08	7	not qualified	not qualified	Håndboldligaen	
2008/09	3	4	EHF Cup	Håndboldligaen	
2009/10	10	not qualified	not qualified	Håndboldligaen	
2010/11	7	not qualified	not qualified	Håndboldligaen	
2011/12	8	not qualified	not qualified	Håndboldligaen	Relegated
2012/13	5	not qualified	?	1st Division	
2013/14	2	promotion to the league	not qualified	1st Division	Promoted
2014/15	8	not qualified	not qualified	Håndboldligaen	

== Cup Winners Cup ==
Season	Round	Club	Home	Away	Aggregate
2004–05	3rd round	(Austria) McDonald's Wr.Neustadt	29–24	34–19	63–43
2004–05	4th round	(Croatia) Podravka Vegeta, Koprivnica	27–27	17–29	44–56
