= Dijana Števin =

Serbian handball player (born 1986)

Personal information
- Nationality: Serbian
- Born: 23 October 1986 (age 39) Zrenjanin, SR Serbia, SFR Yugoslavia
- Height: 1.77 m (5 ft 10 in)

Sport
- Sport: Handball
- Position: Right back
- Current club: Celles Sur Belle
- Number: 8

Senior clubs
- Years: Team
- –2010: ŽRK Kikinda
- 2010–2011: RK Zaječar
- 2011–2015: ŽRK Budućnost Podgorica
- 2012–2013: → HBC Nimes (loan)
- 2015–2017: Cercle Dijon Bourgogne
- 2017–: Celles Sur Belle
National team
Years	Team	Apps	(Gls)
–	Serbia	90	(133)

Dijana Števin (born 23 October 1986) is a Serbian handballer for Celles Sur Belle and the Serbian national team.

== Achievements ==
- Serbian Championship:
  - Winner: 2011
- Serbian Cup:
  - Winner: 2011
