= Sanne Løkka Hagen =

Norwegian handball player (born 2003)

Personal information
- Nationality: Norwegian
- Born: 4 July 2003 (age 23) Notodden, Norway
- Height: 1.73 m (5 ft 8 in)

Sport
- Sport: Handball
- Position: Right back
- Current club: Storhamar HE
- Number: 33

Youth career
- Years: Team
- –: Notodden IL
- –: Gjerpen Håndball

Senior clubs
- Years: Team
- 2019–2022: Flint Tønsberg
- 2022–2024: Tertnes HE
- 2024–2025: Fredrikstad BK
- 2025–: Storhamar HE

Sanne Løkka Hagen (born 4 July 2003) is a Norwegian handball player for Storhamar HE.

== Club career ==
Hagen hails from Notodden, where she, as a youth represented Notodden IL and Gjerpen Håndball. After three seasons playing for Flint Tønsberg, Hagen changed to Tertnes HE in the top division for two seasons. She then played a single season for Fredrikstad BK before signing with reigning champion Storhamar HE, where she, multiple times in the current season, have been the teams top scorer in Champions League.

== International career ==
Hagen represented Norway at the 2019 European Women's U-17 Handball Championship, placing 6th.

She is also a part of Norway's national recruit team in handball.

== Achievements ==
- REMA 1000-ligaen:
  - Silver: 2025/2026
- Norwegian Cup:
  - Winner: 2025
