= Anne Sofie Hjort =

Danish handball player (born 1992)

Personal information
- Full name: Anne Sofie Hjort Nielsen
- Nationality: Danish
- Born: 5 July 1992 (age 34) Herning, Denmark
- Height: 1.86 m (6 ft 1 in)

Sport
- Sport: Handball
- Position: Centre Back
- Current club: Retired
- Number: 15

Senior clubs
- Years: Team
- 2010-2013: Ringkøbing Håndbold
- 2013-2015: Team Tvis Holstebro
- 2015-2017: SK Aarhus
- 2017-2019: Randers HK
National team
| Years | Team | Apps | (Gls) |
| 2012-2014 | Denmark | 3 | (3) |
Medal record
European Junior Championship
| Gold medal – first place | 2011 Netherlands |

Anne Sofie Hjort (born 5 July 1992) is a Danish former handball player who last played for Randers HK.

She played 3 matches for the Danish national team, two friendlies and one match for the qualification for the 2014 European Women's Handball Championship.
