= Stine Kristensen =

Danish handball player (born 1998)

Personal information
- Full name: Stine Opstrup Kristensen
- Nationality: Danish
- Born: 10 August 1998 (age 28) Skanderborg, Denmark
- Height: 1.75 m (5 ft 9 in)

Sport
- Sport: Handball
- Position: Left Back/All round player
- Current club: Ringkøbing Håndbold
- Number: 20

Youth career
- Years: Team
- 2004-2017: Skanderborg Håndbold

Senior clubs
- Years: Team
- 2017–2024: Skanderborg Håndbold
- 2024–: Ringkøbing Håndbold

Stine Opstrup Kristensen (born 10 August 1998) is a Danish handball player who currently plays for Ringkøbing Håndbold.

Kristensen played for Skanderborg Håndbold for 20 years, between 2004 and 2024. On the first team, she established herself as a leading figure and among the most experienced players, managing all three back playing positions. In March 2024, she signed a two-year deal with Ringkøbing Håndbold. She further extended the contract with two years in December 2024.

She is also the elder sister of Danish international Anna Kristensen.
