= Anette Helene Hansen =

Norwegian handball player (born 1992)

Anette Hansen
Personal information
- Full name: Anette Helene Hansen
- Nationality: Norwegian
- Born: 12 February 1992 (age 34) Fredrikstad, Norway
- Height: 1.70 m (5 ft 7 in)

Sport
- Sport: Handball
- Position: Right back

Senior clubs
- Years: Team
- 2008–2010: Rolvsøy IF
- 2010–2015: Fredrikstad BK
- 2015–2017: Halden HK
- 2017–2018: Nantes Loire Atlantique HB
- 2018–2019: Bourg-de-Péage Drôme Handball
- 2019–2020: Fredrikstad BK
Medal record
Youth World Championship
Silver medal – second place	2010 Dominican Republic	Team

Anette Helene Hansen (born 12 February 1992) is a former Norwegian handball player who last played for Fredrikstad BK.

She also represented Norway in the 2012 Women's Junior World Handball Championship, placing 8th.

== Career ==
In 2015, Hansen played for Halden HK. In the summer of 2017, after Halden HK filed for bankruptcy, she left to join Nantes. After a season in Nantes, Hansen joined Bourg-de-Péage for the 2018-2019 season.

== Achievements ==
- World Youth Championship:
  - Silver Medalist: 2010
