= Martine Moen =

Norwegian handball player (born 1992)

Martine Kjøniksen Moen
Personal information
- Nationality: Norwegian
- Born: 30 October 1992 (age 33) Sarpsborg, Norway
- Height: 1.69 m (5 ft 7 in)

Sport
- Sport: Handball
- Position: Left back/centre back
- Current club: Fredrikstad BK

Senior clubs
- Years: Team
- 2008–2011: Sarpsborg IL
- 2011–2016: Halden HK
- 2016–2017: Randers HK
- 2017–2019: Fredrikstad BK

Martine Moen (born 30 October 1992) is a retired Norwegian handball player, who last played for Fredrikstad BK.

In February 2015, she was selected in a squad for Norway's national recruit team in handball. After recovering from a serious injury Moen made a comeback for Halden HK late December 2015, and after improving her play and showing a great form, she was once again selected to represent Norways national recruit team in March 2016.

== Achievements ==
- Norwegian Cup:
  - Finalist: 2014
