= Daniella Dragojevic =

Danish handball player (born 1989)

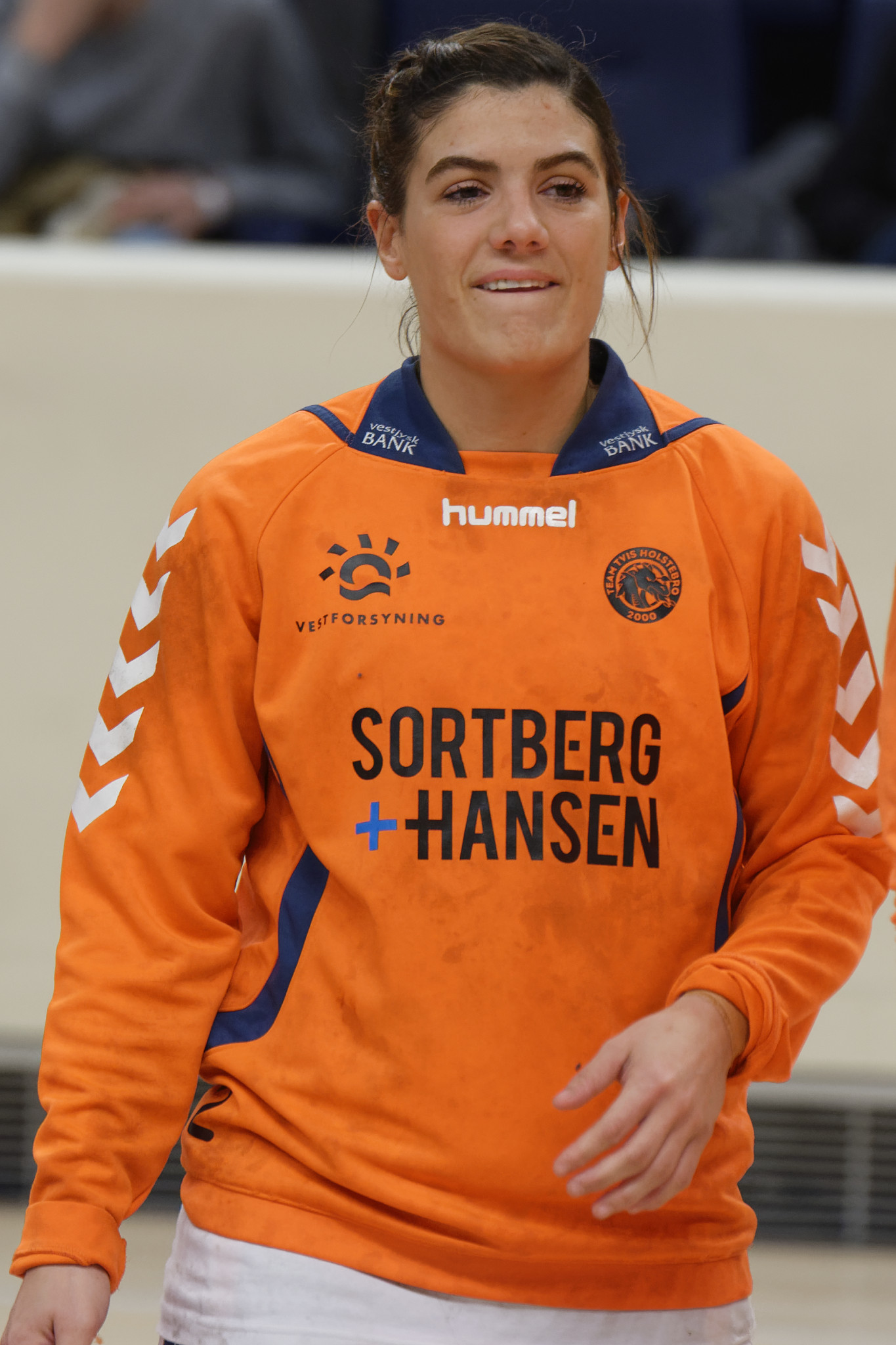
- Daniella Dragojevic in 2015

Personal information
- Full name: Daniella Dragojevic
- Nationality: Danish
- Born: 29 March 1989 (age 37) Copenhagen, Denmark
- Height: 1.73 m (5 ft 8 in)

Sport
- Sport: Handball
- Position: Line Player
- Current club: Retired
- Number: 7

Senior clubs
- Years: Team
- -2009: Slagelse FH
- 2009-2010: Lyngby HK
- 2010-2013: FIF
- 2013-2014: Silkeborg-Voel KFUM
- 2014-2015: Team Tvis Holstebro
- 2015-2017: Silkeborg-Voel KFUM
- 2017-2018: Ringkøbing Håndbold

Daniella Dragojevic (born 23 March 1989) is a Danish former handball player who last played for Ringkøbing Håndbold.
