= Lærke Christensen =

Danish handball player (born 1996)

Personal information
- Nationality: Danish
- Born: 26 May 1996 (age 30) Frederikshavn, Denmark
- Height: 1.85 m (6 ft 1 in)

Sport
- Sport: Handball
- Position: Right back
- Current club: Holstebro Håndbold
- Number: 4

Youth career
- Years: Team
- 2013-2014: Vendsyssel Håndbold

Senior clubs
- Years: Team
- 2014-2015: Vendsyssel Håndbold
- 2015-2017: SK Aarhus
- 2017-2018: Randers HK
- 2018-2022: Holstebro Håndbold
National team
Years	Team	Apps	(Gls)
2017-	Denmark	5	(4)
Medal record
European Youth Championship
Bronze medal – third place	2013 Poland

Lærke Sofie Christensen (born 26 May 1996) is a Danish team handball player who played for the club Holstebro Håndbold until 2022. In her last season at the club, the team was relegated from the Danish top league. She has previously played for the Danish women's national handball team.

== Individual awards ==
- All-Star Best player of the Danish 1st Division: 2014/15
