= Skara HF =

Swedish handball club

- Full name: Skara Handbollsförening
- Short name: Skara HF
- Founded: 8 April 1993
- Arena: Skara Idrottshall, Skara
- Capacity: 1150
- President: Håkan Persson
- Head coach: Rasmus Overby
- League: Handbollsligan
- 2025-26: 2nd
- Club colours
Home	Away

Skara HF is a handball club in Skara, Sweden, established on 8 April 1993 when Hangelösa HF and Stenums IF merged their handball sections. The women's team plays in the Swedish top division since the late 1990s.

In May 2025, they surpringly won the Swedish Championship 'Handbollsligan' for the first time in the club's history.

Location of Skara HF

== Titles ==
- Svensk handbollselit:
  - Winner: 2025
  - Runner-Up: 2026
- Swedish Handball Cup:
  - Runner-Up: 2022

== Team ==
=== Current squad ===
Squad for the 2026–27 season

Goalkeepers

- 20 (Sweden) Rebecca Jernkulle
- 40 (Sweden) Isabella Mouratidou

Wingers
LW

- 5 (Sweden) Vera Blomgren Bustad
- 18 (Switzerland) Melanie Felber

RW

- 10 (Sweden) Mathilda Lundström
- 14 (Sweden) Emma Gyltman

Line players

- 3 (Sweden) Bella Persson
- 11 (Denmark) Natacha Buhl
- 13 (Sweden) Ellen Aronsson

Back players
LB

- 4 (Netherlands) Evi Jaspers
- 9 (Sweden) Hanna Lundvall
- 15 (Sweden) Meja Norrgård

CB

- 2 (Sweden) Vanja Andersson
- 25 (Sweden) Daphne Luchies

RB

- 7 (Sweden) My Morgonstern
- 23 (Sweden) Isabel van Kerkvoorde

=== Transfers ===
Transfers for the 2027-28 season.

Joining

Leaving

=== Technical staff ===
- (Denmark) Head Coach: Rasmus Overby
- (Sweden) Assistant coach: Malin Walette
- (Sweden) Goalkeeping coach: Felix Norrgård
- (Sweden) Team Leader: Alexandra Roos
