= Ulrika Toft Hansen =

Swedish handball player (born 1987)

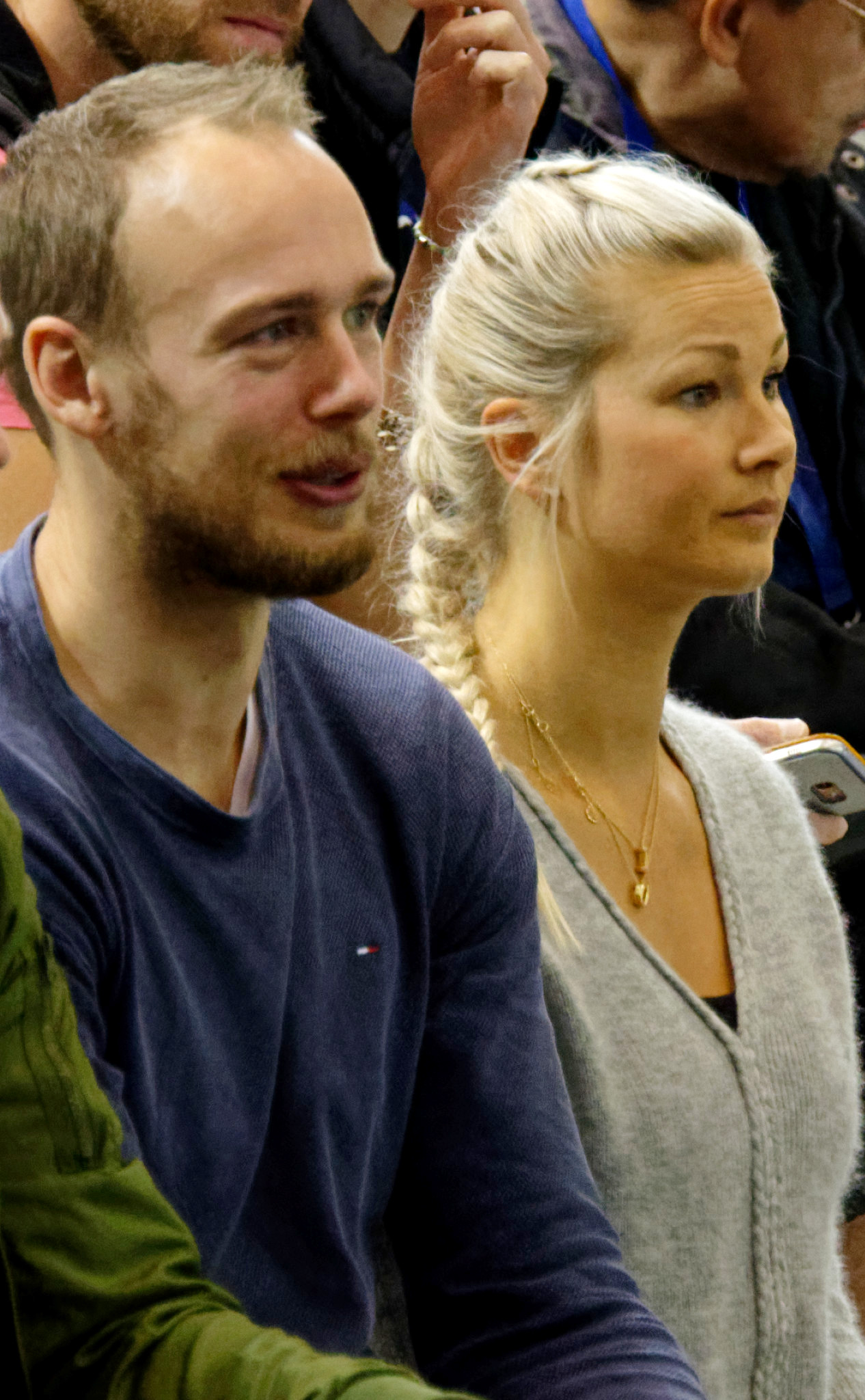

Personal information
- Full name: Ulrika Maria Toft Hansen
- Nationality: Swedish
- Born: 13 July 1987 (age 39) Bankeryd, Sweden
- Height: 1.77 m (5 ft 10 in)

Sport
- Sport: Handball
- Position: Pivot

Senior clubs
- Years: Team
- –2003: IFK Bankeryd
- 2003–2006: IF Hallby HK
- 2006–2008: BK Heid
- 2008–2010: IK Sävehof
- 2010–2012: Team Esbjerg
- 2012–2013: Randers HK
- 2013–2016: Buxtehuder SV
- 2016–2018: Team Esbjerg
- 2019-2020: Paris 92
National team
Years	Team	Apps	(Gls)
2011–2017	Sweden	88	(140)
Medal record
European Championship
Bronze medal – third place	2014 Croatia/Hungary

Ulrika Maria Toft Hansen, née Ågren, (born 13 July 1987) is a Swedish retired handball player.

She participated at the 2011 World Women's Handball Championship in Brazil and the 2012 Summer Olympics, and was a national team player between 2011 and 2017.

In 2017 she was named MVP in the Danish Handball Cup, when she won the tournament with Team Esbjerg.

== Personal life ==
Ulrika Toft Hansen is married to Danish handballer Henrik Toft Hansen. They became parents to a boy, Oliver in November 2015 and to a girl, Ida in July 2018.
