= Melanie Felber =

Austrian handball player (born 1991)

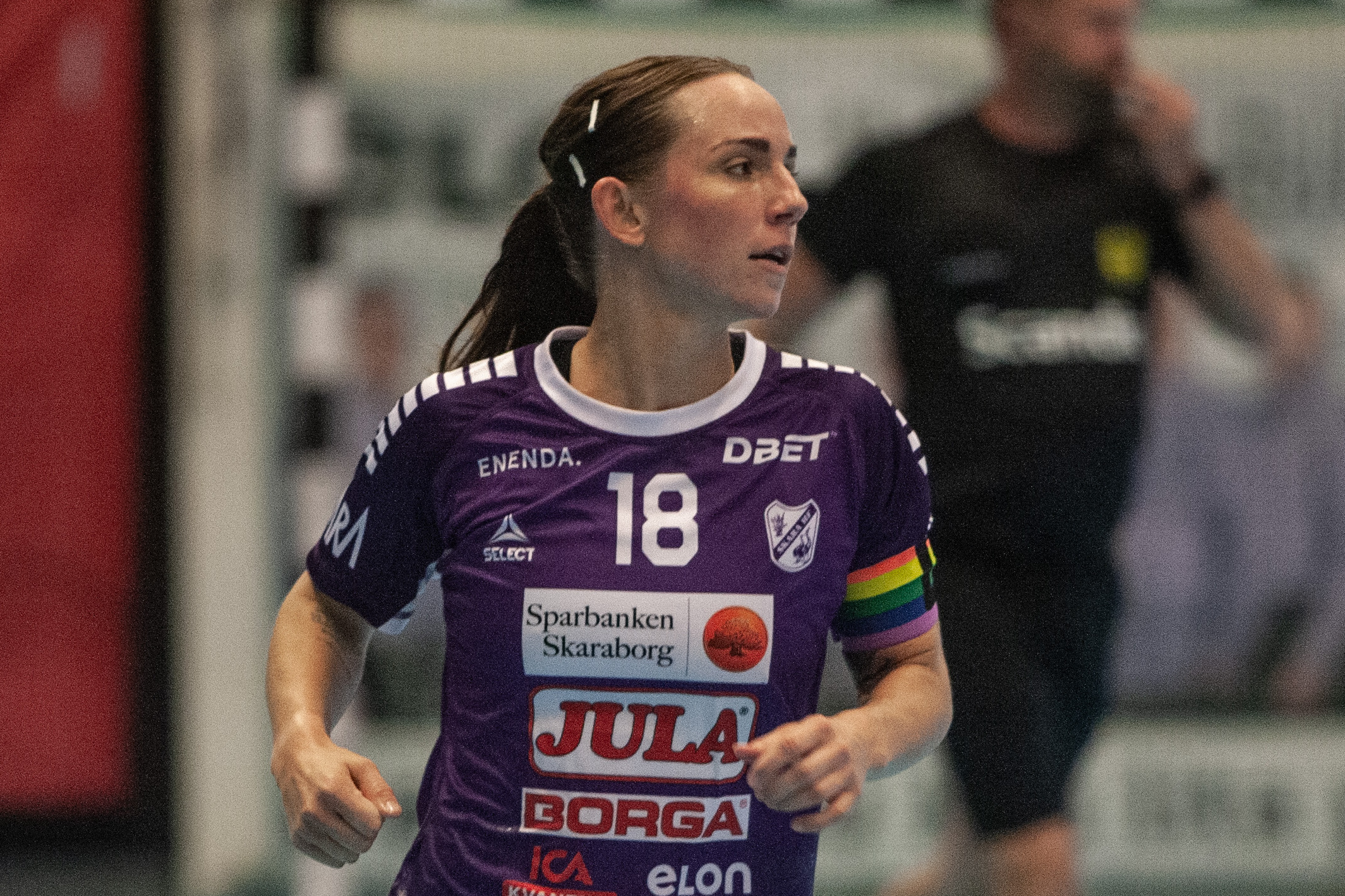

Personal information
- Full name: Melanie Maria Felber
- Nationality: Swiss/Danish
- Born: 14 February 1991 (age 35) Luzern, Switzerland
- Height: 1.63 m (5 ft 4 in)

Sport
- Sport: Handball
- Position: Left wing
- Current club: Skara HF
- Number: 18

Senior clubs
- Years: Team
- –2013: Silkeborg-Voel KFUM
- 2013–2016: Halden HK
- 2016–2018: Fredrikstad BK
- 2018–: Skara HF
National team
Years	Team	Apps	(Gls)
–	Switzerland	14	(19)
- Updated on 21 September 2025

Melanie Maria Felber (born 14 February 1991) is a Danish/Swiss handball player for the Switzerland national team.

== Career ==
Felber was born in Switzerland and grew up in Denmark. She played for Danish team Silkeborg-Voel KFUM until 2013, when she joined the Norwegian team Halden HK. In 2016 she joined league rivals Fredrikstad BK. In 2018 she joined Swedish team Skara HF. There, she won the Swedish Championship in 2025, which was the first in club history.

She represented Switzerland at the 2025 World Women's Handball Championship.
