= Julie Jensen (handballer) =

Danish handball player (born 1996)

Personal information
- Full name: Julie Jensen
- Nationality: Danish
- Born: 25 February 1996 (age 30) Aalborg, Denmark
- Height: 1.80 m (5 ft 11 in)

Sport
- Sport: Handball
- Position: Right back
- Current club: Silkeborg-Voel KFUM
- Number: 12

Youth career
- Years: Team
- 2014-2015: Team Aabybro

Senior clubs
- Years: Team
- 2015-2017: Vendsyssel Håndbold
- 2017-2019: EH Aalborg
- 2019-2020: Herning-Ikast Håndbold
- 2020-: Silkeborg-Voel KFUM
National team
Years	Team	Apps	(Gls)
2020-	Denmark	0	(0)

Julie Jensen (born 25 February 1996) is a Danish handball player for Silkeborg-Voel KFUM and the Danish national team.

She was selected as part of the Danish 35-player squad for the 2020 European Women's Handball Championship.

She competed in the winning team of the Danish Handball Cup 2019.
