= Hanna Åhlén =

Swedish handball player (born 1994)

Personal information
- Nationality: Swedish
- Born: 18 February 1994 (age 32) Västerås?, Sweden
- Height: 1.80 m (5 ft 11 in)

Sport
- Sport: Handball
- Position: Left back
- Current club: HBC Celles-sur-Belle
- Number: 22

Senior clubs
- Years: Team
- 2012–2019: Skuru IK
- 2019–2020: EH Aalborg
- 2020–2021: Larvik HK
- 2021–: HBC Celles-sur-Belle

Hanna Åhlén (born 18 February 1994) is a Swedish handball player for French league club Handball Club Celles-sur-Belle.

She played for the Swedish club Skuru IK for seven years but after defeat in four straight finals in Swedish championship she left for Denmark. After only one year in Denmark she came to former top club Larvik HK in Norway. She only played one year there and left for France.

== Achievements ==
=== Club ===
- Swedish league (Svensk handbollselit):
  - Runner up: 2014, 2015, 2016, 2019 (with Skuru IK)
