= Rikke Jensen =

Danish handball player (born 1995)

Personal information
- Full name: Rikke Slumstrup Jensen
- Nationality: Danish
- Born: 30 September 1995 (age 31) Herning, Denmark
- Height: 1.90 m (6 ft 3 in)

Sport
- Sport: Handball
- Position: Left Back
- Current club: Ringkøbing Håndbold
- Number: 13

Youth career
- Years: Team
- 2012-2014: FC Midtjylland Håndbold

Senior clubs
- Years: Team
- 2012–2015: FC Midtjylland Håndbold
- 2015–2017: IK Sävehof
- 2017–2018: BK Heid
- 2018-2019: HK Aranäs
- 2019-2023: Ringkøbing Håndbold
- 2023-2024: Volda Håndball
- 2024–2025: Søndermarkens IK
- 2025–: Ringkøbing Håndbold
Medal record
IHF Youth World Championship
Gold medal – first place	2012 Montenegro
European Junior Championship
Bronze medal – third place	2013 Denmark

Rikke Slumstrup Jensen (born 30 September 1995) is a Danish handball player who currently plays for Ringkøbing Håndbold. She previously played for the team from 2019 to 2023 and returned in 2025. She is also part of the club's official Hall of Fame.

Jensen has great experience in top divisions, playing for various clubs in Sweden, Denmark and Norway throughout the years. She started her professional career in FC Midtjylland Håndbold in 2012, where she also won the Danish Women's Handball League in 2013 and 2015. She has also won the Handbollsligan in 2016.

She represented the Danish youth national team, winning the 2012 Women's Youth World Handball Championship in Montenegro and bronze at the 2013 edition of European Women's U-19 Handball Championship in Denmark.

== Achievements ==
- Damehåndboldligaen:
  - Winner: 2013, 2015
  - Silver Medalist: 2014
- Handbollsligan:
  - Winner: 2016
- EHF Cup Winners' Cup:
  - Winner: 2015
  - Silver Medalist: 2025
