= Thierry Vincent =

French handball player

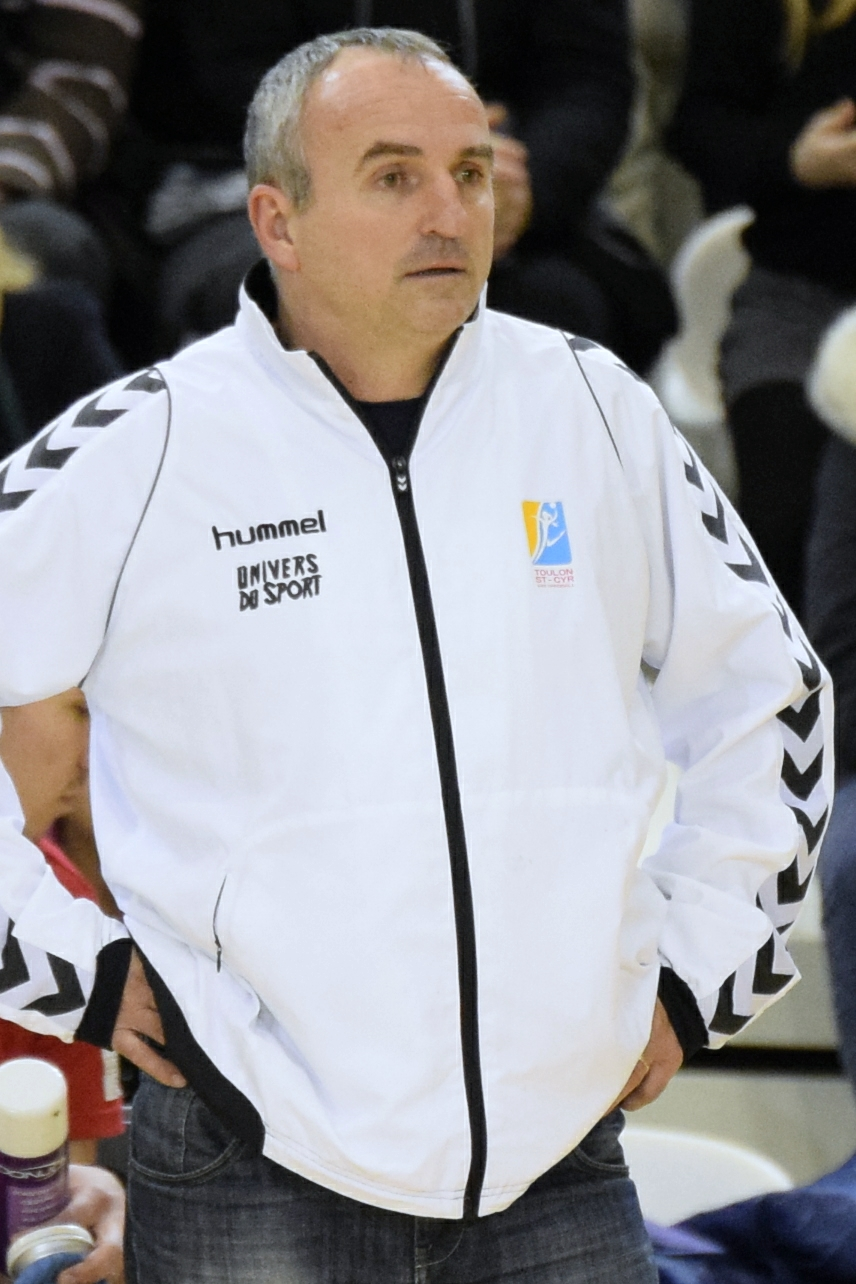
Thierry Vincent, handball coach of the Toulon St-Cyr Var Handball club

Thierry Vincent (born 1 June 1960 in Dax, France) is a French team handball coach. He coaches the Ivorian national team, and participated at the 2011 World Women's Handball Championship in Brazil.
