= Halden HK =

Women's handball team based in Halden

- Full name: Halden Håndballklubb
- Short name: HHK
- Founded: 29 March 1989; 37 years ago
- Dissolved: 28 February 2017; 9 years ago
- Arena: Remmenhallen, Halden
- Capacity: 600
- President: Hans Jørgen Eriksen
- Head coach: Morten Holmen
- League: Eliteserien
- 2015–16: Eliteserien, finished 7th

Halden Håndballklubb was a women's handball team based in Halden, Norway. The team played in Eliteserien, the top division in the country, after its promotion in 2014. The season after they reached the final of the Norwegian Cup. On 28 February 2017, the club announced they were bankrupt. The club was founded on 29 March 1989. The club played in the lower divisions during the 1990's and early 2000's. In 2009 they were promoted to the 2nd Division, and in 2011 to the 1. divisjon. In March 2016, they changed their name from HK Halden to Halden HK.

== Honours ==
- Norwegian Cup:
  - Finalist: 2014

=== Notable former club players ===
- (Norway) Martine Moen
- (Norway) Pernille Wang Skaug
- (Norway) Thea Øby-Olsen
- (Norway) Rikke Granlund
- (Norway) Anette Helene Hansen
- (Norway) Malene Staal
- (Denmark) Hanne Frandsen
- (Denmark) Cecilie Mørch Hansen
- (Denmark) Julie Gantzel Pedersen
- (Denmark) / (Switzerland) Melanie Felber
- (Denmark) Sofie Fynbo Larsen
- (Denmark) Charlotte Bisser

=== EHF Cup Winners' Cup (defunct) ===
Season	Competition	Round	Club	1st leg	2nd leg	Aggregate
2015–16	EHF Cup Winners' Cup	Round 3	(Norway) Vipers Kristiansand	19–25	20–22	39–47
