= Heine Eriksen =

Danish team handball coach

Personal information
- Full name: Heine Mogensen Eriksen
- Nationality: Danish
- Born: November 22, 1963 (age 62) Thy, Denmark

Sport
- Sport: Handball

Teams managed
- Years: Team
- 1995–1996: Thisted IK
- 2001–2002: Horsens HK
- 2002–2004: Fox Team Nord
- 2003–2023: Denmark Youth
- 2005–2006: Randers HK
- 2014–2015: Denmark women (interim)
- 2017–2023: Aarhus United
- 2025–: Fredrikstad BK

Heine Eriksen is a Danish team handball coach.

== Coaching career ==
In the 2001-2002 season he was the head coach at Horsens HK. He then joined Fox Team Nord, where he was until 2004.

Between 2003 and 2023 he coached the Danish national youth team.

In the 2005-06 season he coached Randers HK.

In 2015 he was the interim head coach at Danish senior national team between January and June, when Jan Pytlick resigned.

He coached Aarhus United between 2017 and 2023. He was fired in May 2023 because the club "could not accept his leadership style". The club chairperson, Jan Snogdal, said his leadership style was "based on fear" and "a source of poor mental wellbeing". Eriksen rejected the allegations.
