= Vendsyssel Håndbold =

Danish handball club

- Full name: Vendsyssel Håndbold
- Short name: VEHA
- Founded: May 11, 2011; 15 years ago
- Dissolved: 2022; 4 years ago
- Arena: DRINX Arena
- Capacity: 600
- League: Danish 1st Division
- Club colours
Home	Away

Location of VEHA

Vendsyssel Håndbold was a handball club from Frederikshavn, Denmark. Vendssysel Håndbold played on Frederikshavn FI's license and competed in the women's Danish 1st Division until February 2022. The home arena of the club was DRINX Arena in a small town, outside of Sæby, called Syvsten. It was founded on 11 May 2011.

== History ==
When the team was founded, they started in the third tier, the 2nd Division. In their first season they finished 2nd, which qualified them for the promotion playoff. They did however lose to Tarm-Foersum Håndbold. Despite that they were promoted when IF Stjernen pulled their team from the 1st Division. The team hired former Danish national team coach Lars Rasmussen.

In the 2019-2020 season, Vendsyssel were leading the 1st Division after 19 games with 17 wins, 1 draw and a loss. This was when the Danish Danish Handball Federation decided to cancel the season with 3 matches to go due to the COVID-19 pandemic. Vendsyssel Håndbold was named the winner of the 1st Division and was promoted to the top league.

In the following season they were however relegated when they finished last in the regular season.

It was announced in February 2022, that the club had filed for bankruptcy and the players contracts would be dissolved. The team's placement and points in the Danish 1st Division would also be cancelled. The club's licence was thus handed over to the parent club Frederikshavn FI, which was also relegated to the 3rd division in the 2022/23 season.

== Arena ==
- Name: DRINX Arena
- City: Syvsten, Denmark
- Capacity: 600 spectators
- Address: Idræts Allé 3, 9930 Sæby

== Kits ==
AWAY
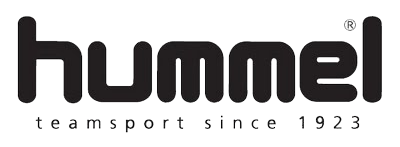
2020-

== Team ==
=== Last squad ===
Squad for the 2021–22 season.

Goalkeepers

- 1 (Netherlands) Jesse van de Polder
- 16 (Denmark) Johanne Graugaard

Wingers
LW

- 8 (Sweden) Elsa Åsberg

RW

- 15 (Denmark) Line Grønning Jensen

Line players

- 6 (Denmark) Christina Hansen
- 14 (Denmark) Rikke Dahl Nielsen

Back players
LB

- 9 (Faroe Islands) Marita Mortensen
- 18 (Denmark) Sofie Hartung Sletskov
- 23 (Denmark) Sofie Lassen

CB

- 5 (Denmark) Mathilde Bo Hald
- 19 (Denmark) Mette Brandt Nielsen
- 26 (Denmark) Christina Pedersen

RB

- 11 (Denmark) Sara Jakobsen Madsen

==== Transfers ====
Transfers for the 2022-23 season

Joining

Leaving

- (Netherlands) Jesse van de Polder (GK) (to (Denmark) Holstebro Håndbold)
- (Denmark) Johanne Graugaard (GK) (to (Denmark) EH Aalborg)
- (Sweden) Elsa Åsberg (LW) (to (Sweden) H 65 Höör)
- (Denmark) Sofie Hartung Sletskov (LB) (to (Denmark) EH Aalborg)
- (Denmark) Sofie Lassen (LB) (to (Denmark) EH Aalborg)
- (Denmark) Mette Brandt Nielsen (CB) (to (Denmark) Randers HK)
- (Denmark) Christina Pedersen (CB) (to (Denmark) HH Elite)
- (Denmark) Sara Jakobsen Hansen (RB) (to (Denmark) Hadsten Sports Klub Håndbold)
- (Denmark) Rikke Dahl Nielsen (P) (to (Denmark) Aalborg HK)
- (Denmark) Christina Hansen (P) (to (Denmark) Aarhus United)

- (Faroe Islands) Marita Mortensen (LB)
- (Denmark) Mathilde Bo Hald (CB)
- (Denmark) Line Grønning Jensen (RW)

=== Notable players ===
- (Brazil) Mariana Costa
- (Brazil) Larissa Araújo
- (Denmark) Kristina Bille
- (Denmark) Lærke Christensen
- (Denmark) Anja Kristensen
- (Denmark) Nadja Lærke
- (Austria) Kristina Logvin
- (Austria) Tanja Logwin
- (Denmark) Silje Aastrøm
- (Norway) Ann-Helen Adolfsen
- (Norway) Pia Harstad
- (North Macedonia) Klaudia Gjorgievska
- (North Macedonia) Zorica Mihajlova
- (Japan) Asahi Kasuya
- (Faroe Islands) Bjarta Osberg Johansen
- (Faroe Islands) Pernille Brandenborg

=== Notable coaches ===
- (Denmark) Lars Rasmussen
- (Austria) Tatjana Logwin

== Kit manufacturers ==
- (Sweden) Craft (2019-2022)
