= Danish Handball Cup 2017 (women's handball) =

2017 Danish Handball Cup
Tournament details
- Country: Denmark

Final positions
- Champions: Team Esbjerg
- Runner-up: København Håndbold

Tournament statistics
- Top goal scorer(s): Mia Rej (27 goals)

Awards
- Best player: Ulrika Toft Hansen

The 2017 Danish Handball Cup (Danish: DHF's Landspokalturnering 2017), known as Santander Cup 2017 for sponsorship reasons, is the 54th edition of the national women's handball cup tournament. Randers HK are the defending champions.

== Format ==
The initial 6 rounds are managed by the regional federations with the DHF taking over the tournament at the round of 16. It ultimately results in a final four event between Christmas and New Year. The winner of the tournament qualify for the Super Cup where they meet the season's league winner. If the same team wins both the league and the cup, the losing cup finalist will be participating in the Super Cup.

== Round of 16 ==
The round of 16 ties were scheduled for 23–30 August 2017.

Team 1	Score	Team 2
23 August
Ajax København	19–36	Nykøbing Falster Håndboldklub
24 August
Lyngby HK	15–34	FC Midtjylland Håndbold
TTH Holstebro	22–34	København Håndbold
25 August
Ringkøbing Håndbold	16–25	Team Esbjerg
SønderjyskE Håndbold	19–30	Viborg HK
26 August
Skanderborg Håndbold	16–37	Silkeborg-Voel KFUM
27 August
Roskilde Håndbold	16–26	Randers HK
30 August
Aarhus United	DSQ (Note: Although Odense Håndbold won the game, they were later disqualified for having their newly signed player Mie Højlund on the team sheet despite not yet being eligible to play for her new club. As such Aarhus United will assume their place in the quarter-final against Viborg HK. The game originally ended 18–21.)	Odense Håndbold

== Quarter-finals ==
The quarter-final ties are scheduled for 24–25 October 2017.

Team 1	Score	Team 2
24 October
København Håndbold	27–20	Randers HK
Aarhus United	21–18	Viborg HK
25 October
Silkeborg-Voel KFUM	22–24	FC Midtjylland Håndbold
Team Esbjerg	27–22	Nykøbing Falster Håndboldklub

== Final4 ==
The final four event is scheduled for 29–30 December 2017 in Jysk Arena, Silkeborg.

Semi-finals
29 December
Aarhus United	19
København Håndbold	27
29 December
Team Esbjerg	23
FC Midtjylland Håndbold	22

Final
30 December
København Håndbold	20
Team Esbjerg	31
Bronze medal match
30 December
Aarhus United	23
FC Midtjylland Håndbold	22

=== Semi-finals ===
29 December 2017; 18:00 (CEST)	Aarhus United	19-27	København Håndbold	Jysk Arena, Silkeborg; Attendance: 1,550; Referees: Skjøth Søegaard, Kalisz Nielsen
29 December 2017; 18:00 (CEST)	Petersen 5	(7–10)	Alm 6	Jysk Arena, Silkeborg; Attendance: 1,550; Referees: Skjøth Søegaard, Kalisz Nielsen
29 December 2017; 18:00 (CEST)	3× (yellow card) 1× (suspension)	Report	2× (yellow card) 1× (suspension)	Jysk Arena, Silkeborg; Attendance: 1,550; Referees: Skjøth Søegaard, Kalisz Nielsen

29 December 2017; 20:00 (CEST)	Team Esbjerg	23–22	FC Midtjylland Håndbold	Jysk Arena, Silkeborg; Attendance: 1,683; Referees: Dahl Hermann, Madsen
29 December 2017; 20:00 (CEST)	Bjørndalen 7	(9–13)	Kristiansen 8	Jysk Arena, Silkeborg; Attendance: 1,683; Referees: Dahl Hermann, Madsen
29 December 2017; 20:00 (CEST)	4× (yellow card) 5× (suspension)	Report	4× (yellow card) 3× (suspension)	Jysk Arena, Silkeborg; Attendance: 1,683; Referees: Dahl Hermann, Madsen

=== Bronze medal match ===
30 December 2017; 14:00 (CEST)	Aarhus United	23–22	FC Midtjylland Håndbold	Jysk Arena, Silkeborg; Attendance: 1,475; Referees: Krause-Kjær, Pedersen
30 December 2017; 14:00 (CEST)	Haraldsdóttir 9	(11–12)	Burgaard 5	Jysk Arena, Silkeborg; Attendance: 1,475; Referees: Krause-Kjær, Pedersen
30 December 2017; 14:00 (CEST)	2× (suspension)	Report	2× (yellow card) 3× (suspension)	Jysk Arena, Silkeborg; Attendance: 1,475; Referees: Krause-Kjær, Pedersen

=== Final ===
30 December 2017; 16:00 (CEST)	København Håndbold	20–31	Team Esbjerg	Jysk Arena, Silkeborg; Attendance: 1,725; Referees: Christiansen, Hesseldal Hansen
30 December 2017; 16:00 (CEST)	Kragballe 4	(11–17)	Toft Hansen 8	Jysk Arena, Silkeborg; Attendance: 1,725; Referees: Christiansen, Hesseldal Hansen
30 December 2017; 16:00 (CEST)	2× (yellow card) 2× (suspension)	Report	1× (yellow card)	Jysk Arena, Silkeborg; Attendance: 1,725; Referees: Christiansen, Hesseldal Hansen

== Final ranking and statistics ==
=== Top goalscorers ===
As of 30 October 2017.

Rank	Player	Club	Goals
1	(Denmark) Mia Rej	København Håndbold	27
2	(Iceland) Birna Berg Haraldsdóttir	Aarhus United	24
3	(Norway) Veronica Kristiansen	FC Midtjylland Håndbold	20
3	(Netherlands) Estavana Polman	Team Esbjerg	20
5	(Denmark) Louise Burgaard	FC Midtjylland Håndbold	19
6	(Norway) Ida Bjørndalen Karlsson	Team Esbjerg	18
7	(Sweden) Jenny Alm	København Håndbold	15
7	(Norway) Vilde Ingstad	Team Esbjerg	15
9	(Sweden) Ulrika Toft Hansen	Team Esbjerg	14
10	(Denmark) Ann Grete Nørgaard	Viborg HK	13

Danish Handball Cup 2017 winners

Team Esbjerg
First title

Team roster: Sofie Blicher-Toft, Anne Brinch-Nielsen, Ulrika Toft Hansen, Vilde Ingstad, Ida Bjørndalen Karlsson, Maibritt Kviesgaard, Kristina Liščević, Jane Mayes, Lara González Ortega, Estavana Polman, Sanna Solberg, Ine Karlsen Stangvik, Sandra Toft, Maria Mose Vestergaard, Lene Østergaard
Head coach: Jesper Jensen

=== Most valuable player ===
MVP was announced after the final on 30 December 2017.

Most valuable player: Ulrika Toft Hansen (SWE)
