= Ringkøbing Håndbold =

Danish handball club

- Full name: Ringkøbing Håndbold
- Founded: 2007; 19 years ago
- Arena: Green Sports Arena
- Capacity: 1,100
- President: Lars Buhl
- Head coach: Jesper Holmris
- League: Damehåndboldligaen
- 2025–26: 11th
Home	Away

Location of Ringkøbing

Ringkøbing Håndbold (Ringkøbing Handball) is a Danish handball club from Ringkøbing. The club are currently competing in the Danish Women's Handball League as of the 2026–27 season.

When they played in the Danish 1st division, they reached the promotion play-off three times in a row in 2008/09, 2009/10 and 2010/11, but they did not manage to be promoted. In 2013 a week before the beginning of the 2013/2014 season, the top flight club Aalborg DH went bankrupt and was thus administratively relegated. Ringkøbing Håndbold were offered to take their place, which they accepted.

Ringkøbing Håndbold played six seasons in the top flight before being relegated in 2018/2019 season. The next season promotion was just missed, when the club came second in the 1st division. However, in the 2020/2021 season they won the 1st Division and thus promoted once again to the top flight.

== Kits ==
AWAY
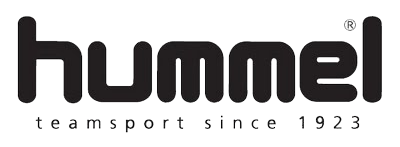
2018–19

== Stadium ==
- Name: Green Sports Arena
- City: Ringkøbing
- Capacity: 1,100 persons
- Address: Kirkevej 26, Rindum, Ringkøbing

== Team ==
=== Current squad ===
Squad for the 2026–27 season

Goalkeepers

- 16 (Denmark) Stephanie Christensen
- 67 (Denmark) Clara Bak

Wingers
LW

- 17 (Denmark) Annesofie Grønning
- 18 (Denmark) Emilie Rosborg

RW

- 4 (Denmark) Emilie Nørgaard Bech
- 22 (Denmark) Sofie Østergaard

Line players

- 3 (Denmark) Sarah Vest Kirkeløkke
- 8 (Denmark) Camilla Vinding Pedersen
- 19 (Denmark) Amanda Loft Hansen

Back players
LB

- 9 (Denmark) Mathilde Høy Troelsen
- 13 (Denmark) Rikke Jensen
- 14 (Denmark) Verona Rexhepi

CB

- 5 (Denmark) Freya Hattesen
- 15 (Denmark) Jane Mejlvang
- 20 (Denmark) Stine Kristensen

RB

- 11 (Denmark) Sara Madsen

=== Transfers ===
Transfers for the 2026-27 season

Joining

- (Denmark) Clara Bak (GK) (from (Denmark) Bjerringbro FH)
- (Denmark) Freya Hattesen (CB) (from (Denmark) Gudme HK)
- (Denmark) Sara Madsen (RB) (from (Denmark) Silkeborg-Voel KFUM)
- (Denmark) Caroline Søgaard (RB)

Leaving

- (Faroe Islands) Rakul Wardum (GK) (to (Denmark) Skanderborg Håndbold)
- (Denmark) Alberte Hamborg (GK) (to (Denmark) Aarhus Håndbold)
- (Denmark) Frida Høgaard (RB) (to (Denmark) EH Aalborg)
- (Denmark) Caroline Søgaard (RB) (to (Denmark) Aarhus Håndbold)

=== Notable players ===
- (Denmark) Mia Biltoft
- (Denmark) Sofie Blichert-Toft
- (Denmark) Daniella Dragojevic
- (Denmark) Mathilde Neesgaard
- (Denmark) Julie Gantzel Pedersen
- (Denmark) Anne Sofie Hjort
- (Denmark) Anne Mette Pedersen
- (Denmark) Camilla Maibom
- (Denmark) Julie Aagaard
- (Denmark) Amanda Brogaard
- (Denmark) Malene Dalgaard
- (Denmark) Louise Gundesbøl Sørensen
- (Denmark) Henriette Holm
- (Denmark) Hanne Trangeled Nielsen
- (Denmark) Kirstine Kjeldgaard
- (Denmark) Miriam Juul
- (Denmark) Maria Ipsen
- (Denmark) Katrine Thomsen
- (Denmark) Liza Olsen
- (Denmark) Betina Kjær
- (Denmark) Henriette Holm
- (Denmark) Mille Hundahl
- (Denmark) Julie Kjær Larsen
- (Sweden) Michaela Ek
- (Sweden) Linnéa Claeson
- (Sweden) Emma Friberg
- (Sweden) Sara Nirvander
- (Sweden) Martina Adamsson Jensen
- (Sweden) Melissa Petrén
- (Norway) Ane Eidem
- (Croatia) Simona Hajduk
- (Brazil) Jaqueline Anastácio
- (Germany) Caroline Müller
- (Serbia) Željka Nikolić

== Head coach history ==
(Denmark)	Tomas Jensen	2007
(Denmark)	Kim Olesen	2008
(Denmark)	Jan-Ole Kristensen	2008
(Denmark)	Thomas Hørlyk	2008–2011
(Denmark)	Jens Steffensen	2012
(Denmark)	Allan Heine	2012–2015
(Denmark)	Lars Rasmussen	2015–2017
(Denmark)	Mada Brandt	2017–2018
(Denmark)	Morten Secher	2019
(Denmark)	Jesper Holmris	2019–
