= Aarhus United Elitehandball =

Danish handball club

Aarhus United Elitehåndbold
- Short name: Aarhus United Elitehåndbold A/S
- Founded: April 7, 2017; 9 years ago
- Dissolved: July 1, 2024; 2 years ago
- Arena: Ceres Stadionhal
- Capacity: 1,200
- League: Danish Women's Handball League
- 2023–24: 12th
- Club colours
Home	Away

Location of United

Aarhus United was a Danish women's handball club based in Aarhus. They played in Damehåndboldligaen, Denmark's premier women's handball league. Aarhus United was founded in 2017 and took over SK Aarhus's league license for the 2017-18 season.

In June 2024, it was announced that the club and another Aarhus based handball team Aarhus HC had decided to merge under the new club name Aarhus Håndbold.

Aarhus United was founded as a reaction to the closing of the former Aarhus club SK Århus closing. The previous club had to close as the head sponsor withdrew, and the economy was not good enough to maintain the club. In their first season the club signed all former SK Århus players, and added Birna Berg Haraldsdóttir, June Bøttger, Louise Kristensen and Ditte Vind. Heine Eriksen was made the head coach.

In their first season they reached the semifinals of the Danish Cup and took bronze medals after beating København Håndbold. They were awarded the win in the round of 16 against Odense Håndbold, as they had featured Mie Højlund without her being eligible.

== Kits ==
HOME
2017–20	H2O; 2020-

== Results ==
- Danish Cup
  - Bronze (1): 2017

== See also ==
- SK Aarhus
- Aarhus Håndbold (women's handball)
