= 2011–12 Damehåndboldligaen =

Damehåndboldligaen
- Season: 2011–12
- Champions: Randers HK
- Relegated: Silkeborg-Voel KFUM, SK Aarhus
- Matches: 132
- Goals: 6,693 (50.7 per match)
- Top goalscorer: (Denmark) Mette Gravholt, TTH (141)
- Highest attendance: 2,446 Aal - VHK4 January 2012
- Lowest attendance: 157 FIF - Vej8 February 2012
- Average attendance: 949

The 2011–12 Damehåndboldligaen was the 76th season of the Damehåndboldligaen, Denmark's premier Handball league. Viborg HK won the regular season, while Randers HK won the Championship, beating Viborg in the final.

Silkeborg-Voel KFUM was relegated after finishing last in the regular season. SK Aarhus was relegated after losing the relegation play-off to KIF Vejen.

== Team information ==
The following 12 clubs compete in the Damehåndboldligaen during the 2011–12 season:

| Team | Location | Arena | Capacity |
|---|---|---|---|
| Team Esbjerg | Esbjerg | Blue Water Dokken | 2,549 |
| HC Odense | Odense | Odense Idrætshal | 2,300 |
| Aalborg DH | Aalborg | Gigantium | 1,300 |
| Midtjylland | Ikast | Ikast-Brande Arena | 2,550 |
| Frederiksberg IF | Frederiksberg | Frederiksberghallen | 1,469 |
| Randers HK | Randers | Arena Randers | 3,000 |
| Slagelse DH | Slagelse | Antvorskovhallen | 1,310 |
| Vejen EH | Vejen | Vejen Idrætscenter | |
| SK Aarhus | Aarhus | Vejlby-Risskov Hallen | 1,152 |
| Silkeborg-Voel KFUM | Voel | | |
| TTH | Holstebro | Gråkjær Arena | 3,250 |
| Viborg HK | Viborg | Viborg Stadionhal | 3,000 |

== Regular season ==
=== Standings ===
| Pos | Team | Pld | W | D | L | GF | GA | GD | Pts | Qualification or relegation |
|---|---|---|---|---|---|---|---|---|---|---|
| 1 | Viborg HK | 22 | 19 | 1 | 2 | 725 | 525 | +200 | 39 | Championship Round |
| 2 | Tvis Holstebro | 22 | 18 | 1 | 3 | 682 | 591 | +91 | 37 | Championship Round |
| 3 | Randers | 22 | 17 | 0 | 5 | 601 | 504 | +97 | 34 | Championship Round |
| 4 | Midtjylland | 22 | 17 | 0 | 5 | 593 | 502 | +91 | 34 | Championship Round |
| 5 | Esbjerg | 22 | 11 | 2 | 9 | 583 | 536 | +47 | 24 | Championship Round |
| 6 | Frederiksberg IF | 22 | 9 | 1 | 12 | 539 | 542 | −3 | 19 | Championship Round |
| 7 | Aalborg DH | 22 | 8 | 0 | 14 | 522 | 584 | −62 | 16 | Relegation Round |
| 8 | SK Aarhus | 22 | 8 | 0 | 14 | 506 | 577 | −71 | 16 | Relegation Round |
| 9 | Vejen EH | 22 | 6 | 2 | 14 | 506 | 569 | −63 | 14 | Relegation Round |
| 10 | HC Odense | 22 | 6 | 1 | 15 | 462 | 545 | −83 | 13 | Relegation Round |
| 11 | Slagelse DH | 22 | 3 | 4 | 15 | 499 | 620 | −121 | 10 | Relegation Round |
| 12 | Silkeborg-Voel | 22 | 4 | 0 | 18 | 475 | 598 | −123 | 8 | Relegation |

Source: Flashscore

== Championship playoffs ==
The top 6 teams from the regular season competed in two groups of three. Top two advanced to the semifinals. The first and second placed teams where awarded 1 point in each of their groups.

=== Pot 1 ===
| Pos | Team | Pld | W | D | L | GF | GA | GD | Pts | Qualification |
|---|---|---|---|---|---|---|---|---|---|---|
| 1 | FCM | 4 | 3 | 0 | 1 | 105 | 94 | +11 | 6 | Semifinals |
| 2 | Viborg HK (Note: including 1 bonus point) | 4 | 2 | 0 | 2 | 100 | 94 | +6 | 5 | Semifinals |
| 3 | FIF | 4 | 1 | 0 | 3 | 90 | 107 | −17 | 2 | |

=== Pot 2 ===
| Pos | Team | Pld | W | D | L | GF | GA | GD | Pts | Qualification |
|---|---|---|---|---|---|---|---|---|---|---|
| 1 | TTH (Note: including 1 bonus point) | 4 | 3 | 0 | 1 | 124 | 107 | +17 | 7 | Semifinals |
| 2 | Randers HK | 4 | 3 | 0 | 1 | 113 | 103 | +10 | 6 | Semifinals |
| 3 | Esbjerg | 4 | 0 | 0 | 4 | 87 | 114 | −27 | 0 | |

=== Semifinals ===
| Dates | | Home team in the 1st match | Home team in the 2nd match | Results | | |
|---|---|---|---|---|---|---|
| 1st match | 2nd match | Home team in the 1st match | Home team in the 2nd match | Aggregate | 1st match | 2nd match |
| 1/5 | 8/5 | Randers HK | FC Midtjylland | 49-56 | 23-26 | 26–20 |
| 2/5 | 9/5 | Viborg HK | TTH | 73-47 | 37–20 | 36–27 |

=== Bronze match ===
| Dates | | Home team in the 1st match | Home team in the 2nd match | Results | | |
|---|---|---|---|---|---|---|
| 1st match | 2nd match | Home team in the 1st match | Home team in the 2nd match | Aggregate | 1st match | 2nd match |
| 16/5 | 19/5 | FC Midtjylland | TTH | 52–51 | 26-24 | 26–27 |

=== Final ===
| Dates | | Home team in the 1st match | Home team in the 2nd match | Results | | |
|---|---|---|---|---|---|---|
| 1st match | 2nd match | Home team in the 1st match | Home team in the 2nd match | Aggregate | 1st match | 2nd match |
| 17/5 | 19/5 | Randers HK | Viborg HK | 60-56 | 29–30 | 31–26 |

== Relegation playoff ==
The 7th and 8th place team from the regular season starts the relegation playoff with 2 points, number 9 and 10 start with 1 point, and the rest start with 0.

=== Group 1 ===
| Pos | Team | Pld | W | D | L | GF | GA | GD | Pts | Qualification |
|---|---|---|---|---|---|---|---|---|---|---|
| 1 | Aalborg DH (Note: including 2 bonus point) | 6 | 5 | 0 | 1 | 191 | 155 | +36 | 12 | Promotion to 2012–13 Damehåndboldligaen |
| 2 | SønderjyskE | 6 | 5 | 0 | 1 | 190 | 161 | +29 | 10 | Promotion to 2012–13 Damehåndboldligaen |
| 3 | Vejen (Note: including 1 bonus point) | 6 | 2 | 0 | 4 | 149 | 165 | −16 | 5 | Relegation playoff |
| 4 | Ringkøbing | 6 | 0 | 0 | 6 | 146 | 195 | −49 | 0 | Relegation to 1st Division |

Source: Flashscore

=== Group 2 ===
| Pos | Team | Pld | W | D | L | GF | GA | GD | Pts | Qualification |
|---|---|---|---|---|---|---|---|---|---|---|
| 1 | Odense (Note: including 1 bonus point) | 6 | 5 | 0 | 1 | 136 | 123 | +13 | 11 | Promotion to 2012–13 Damehåndboldligaen |
| 2 | Slagelse FH | 6 | 4 | 0 | 2 | 144 | 125 | +19 | 8 | Promotion to 2012–13 Damehåndboldligaen |
| 3 | SK Aarhus (Note: including 2 bonus point) | 6 | 1 | 0 | 5 | 122 | 149 | −27 | 4 | Relegation playoff |
| 4 | Lyngby HK | 6 | 2 | 0 | 4 | 127 | 132 | −5 | 4 | Relegation to 1st Division |

Source: Flashscore
