= 2015–16 Damehåndboldligaen =

Damehåndboldligaen
- Season: 2015–16
- Champions: Team Esbjerg _{(first title)}
- Relegated: SønderjyskE Damer
- Champions League: Team Esbjerg
- Champions League: FC Midtjylland Håndbold
- Matches: 146
- Goals: 7,501 (51.38 per match)
- Top goalscorer: (Sweden) Nathalie Hagman (191 goals)
- Biggest home win: NFH 41–25 SønderjyskE
- Biggest away win: SønderjyskE 18–32 Randers
- Highest scoring: TTH 36–32 SønderjyskE
- Longest winless run: SønderjyskE 22
- Longest losing run: SønderjyskE 22

The 2015–16 Damehåndboldligaen (known as the Primo Tours Ligaen for sponsorship reasons) was the 80th season of the Damehåndboldligaen, Denmark's premier Handball league. The reigning champions were FC Midtjylland.

Team Esbjerg won the title, when they beat FC Midtjylland in the final. This was the first time Esbjerg won the Danish Championship. SønderjyskE Håndbold were relegated, as they finished last in the regular season.

== Team information ==
Skive fH was originally going to play in the league in the 2015-16 season but the club's economy forced them to withdraw and their place was offered to Nykøbing Falster Håndboldklub instead.

Team.	Town	Arena	Capacity
FC Midtjylland	Ikast	Ikast-Brande Arena	2.850
HC Odense	Odense	Odense Idrætshal	2.256
København Håndbold	København	Frederiksberghallen	1.468
Nykøbing Falster	Nykøbing Falster	Scandlines Arena	1.300
Randers HK	Randers	Arena Randers	3.000
Ringkøbing Håndbold	Ringkøbing	Rofi-Centret	1.100
Silkeborg-Voel KFUM	Silkeborg	Jysk Arena	3.000
SK Aarhus	Aarhus	Den Lille Kro Arena	1.152
SønderjyskE	Aabenraa	Aabenraa Idrætscenter	1.000
Team Esbjerg	Esbjerg	Blue Water Dokken	2.549
Team Tvis Holstebro	Holstebro	Gråkjær Arena	3.250
Viborg HK	Viborg	Viborg Stadionhal	3.000

== Regular season ==
=== Standings ===
Pos	Team	Pld	W	D	L	GF	GA	GD	Pts	Qualification or relegation
1	Team Esbjerg	22	15	4	3	653	569	+84	34	Semifinal
2	FC Midtjylland	22	15	2	5	541	476	+65	32	Semifinal
3	Viborg HK	22	12	4	6	559	526	+33	28	Quarterfinal
4	Team Tvis Holstebro	22	13	1	8	601	570	+31	27	Quarterfinal
5	Randers HK	22	12	3	7	598	565	+33	27	Quarterfinal
6	Nykøbing Falster	22	10	4	8	624	607	+17	24	Quarterfinal
7	København Håndbold	22	10	1	11	549	539	+10	21	
8	Silkeborg-Voel KFUM	22	10	1	11	531	544	−13	21	
9	HC Odense	22	9	2	11	555	531	+24	20	
10	SK Aarhus	22	8	0	14	541	571	−30	16	Relegation Round
11	Ringkøbing Håndbold	22	6	2	14	511	586	−75	14	Relegation Round
12	SønderjyskE (R)	22	0	0	22	525	704	−179	0	Relegation

Updated to match(es) played on 31 March 2016. Source:
Rules for classification: 1) points; 2) Goal difference; 3) Goals scored.
(R) Relegated

=== Results ===
Home \ Away	FCM	HCO	KBH	NFH	RAN	RIN	SIL	AAR	SØN	ESB	TTH	VHK
FC Midtjylland		28–24	30–25	26–26	24–15	31–15	19–18	24–18	32–22	25–27	26–22	17–17
HC Odense	21–18		23–29	29–31	26–21	20–20	13–15	25–26	31–24	23–23	26–19	24–25
København Håndbold	17–23	24–32		31–25	24–23	21–24	23–18	19–20	31–17	28–26	33–20	25–19
Nykøbing F.	25–26	30–21	28–28		24–34	28–26	29–29	29–26	41–25	23–27	29–27	25–30
Randers HK	28–27	28–25	20–23	31–26		36–26	32–26	25–22	35–31	29–29	22–30	25–25
Ringkøbing Håndbold	15–25	16–25	26–25	25–31	25–32		23–24	25–23	29–19	24–37	37–30	19–28
Silkeborg-Voel	27–21	17–31	25–23	23–22	25–28	24–17		35–26	30–21	28–27	23–24	21–25
SK Aarhus	21–22	24–32	22–21	30–33	22–23	21–18	28–24		33–18	26–28	30–37	28–23
SønderjyskE	25–27	24–28	29–31	22–34	18–32	21–26	27–29	27–30		27–34	26–36	19–31
Team Esbjerg	29–23	37–32	29–22	38–29	30–30	28–23	31–23	29–27	35–27		28–32	27–20
Team Tvis Holstebro	20–24	27–22	32–19	24–27	28–26	33–28	24–19	31–19	36–32	23–23		20–28
Viborg HK	19–23	25–22	28–27	29–29	29–23	24–24	30–28	23–19	33–24	25–31	23–26	

Legend: Blue = home team win; Yellow = draw; Red = away team win.

=== Top Goalscorer – Regular Season ===
As of matches played on 23 March 2016

Rank	Player	Club	Goals
1	(Denmark) Kristina Kristiansen	Nykøbing Falster Håndboldklub	167
2	(Sweden) Nathalie Hagman	Team Tvis Holstebro	157
3	(Denmark) Ann Grete Nørgaard	Viborg HK	136
4	(Denmark) Trine Troelsen	Silkeborg-Voel KFUM	134
5	(Netherlands) Estavana Polman	Team Esbjerg	128
6	(Denmark) Camilla Dalby	Randers HK	123
7	(Netherlands) Laura van der Heijden	Team Esbjerg	117
8	(Denmark) Susanne Madsen	SønderjyskE Håndbold	116
9	(Denmark) Mette Gravholt	Nykøbing Falster Håndboldklub	113
10	(Sweden) Johanna Ahlm	FC Midtjylland Håndbold	107

== Championship playoffs ==
=== Quarterfinal ===
Dates		Home team in the 1st match	Home team in the 2nd match	Results		
1st match	2nd match	Home team in the 1st match	Home team in the 2nd match	Aggregate	1st match	2nd match
6/4	13/4	Nykøbing F. Håndboldklub	Viborg HK	45–52	20–25	25–27
6/4	13/4	Randers HK	Team Tvis Holstebro	49–59	23–26	26–33

=== Semifinal ===
Dates		Home team in the 1st match	Home team in the 2nd match	Results		
1st match	2nd match	Home team in the 1st match	Home team in the 2nd match	Aggregate	1st match	2nd match
16/4	23/4	Team Tvis Holstebro	Team Esbjerg	51–58	32–27	31–19
17/4	24/4	Viborg HK	FC Midtjylland Håndbold	43–55	23–26	29–20

=== Bronze Match ===
Dates		Home team in the 1st match	Home team in the 2nd match	Results		
1st match	2nd match	Home team in the 1st match	Home team in the 2nd match	Aggregate	1st match	2nd match
4/5	11/5	Team Tvis Holstebro	Viborg HK	54–46	30–23	23–24

=== Final ===
Dates		Home team in the 1st match	Home team in the 2nd match	Results		
1st match	2nd match	Home team in the 1st match	Home team in the 2nd match	Aggregate	1st match	2nd match
1/5	5/5	FC Midtjylland Håndbold	Team Esbjerg	39–41	20–17	24–19

== Relegation playoff ==
=== Group 1 ===
Dato		Home team in the 1st match	Home team in the 2nd match	Results		
1st match	2nd match	Home team in the 1st match	Home team in the 2nd match	Aggregate	1st match	2nd match
10/4	17/4	Lyngby HK	SK Aarhus	40–76	18–34	22–42

=== Group 2 ===
Dato		Home team in the 1st match	Home team in the 2nd match	Results		
1st match	2nd match	Home team in the 1st match	Home team in the 2nd match	Aggregate	1st match	2nd match
9/4	16/4.	Ajax København	Ringkøbing Håndbold	43–52	20–24	23–28

== All Star Team ==
- Goalkeeper: (Norway) Silje Solberg (TTH)
- Left Wing: (Denmark) Ann Grete Nørgaard (VHK)
- Left Back: (Denmark) Trine Troelsen (SIL)
- Centre Back: (Denmark) Kristina Kristiansen (NFH)
- Pivot: (Denmark) Mette Gravholt (NFH)
- Right Back: (Sweden) Nathalie Hagman (TTH)
- Right Wing: (Denmark) Lina Rask (AAR)

=== Coach of the season ===
(Sweden) Pether Krautmeyer

== Top goalscorers ==
Rank	Player	Club	Goals
1	(Sweden) Nathalie Hagman	Team Tvis Holstebro	191
2	(Denmark) Kristina Kristiansen	Nykøbing Falster Håndboldklub	176
3	(Denmark) Ann Grete Nørgaard	Viborg HK	152
4	(Netherlands) Estavana Polman	Team Esbjerg	134
5	(Denmark) Trine Troelsen	Silkeborg-Voel KFUM	134
6	(Netherlands) Laura van der Heijden	Team Esbjerg	132
7	(Denmark) Camilla Dalby	Randers HK	127
8	(Denmark) Rikke Skov	Viborg HK	121
9	(Denmark) Mette Gravholt	Nykøbing Falster Håndboldklub	120
10	(Sweden) Johanna Ahlm	FC Midtjylland Håndbold	118
