= 2012–13 Damehåndboldligaen =

Damehåndboldligaen
- Season: 2012–13
- Champions: FCM Håndbold
- Relegated: Slagelse DH (adstrative relegation)
- Champions League: FCM Håndbold
- Top goalscorer: (Netherlands) Estavana Polman (138)
- Highest scoring: Skive fH 29-46 TTH

The 2012–13 Damehåndboldligaen (known as the GuldBageren ligaen for sponsorship reasons) was the 77th season of the Damehåndboldligaen, Denmark's premier Handball league. Nykøbing Falster Håndboldklub were the promoted team from the 1st Division for the first time in club history. The reigning champions were Randers HK.

FC Midtjylland won the title, when they beat Team Tvis Holstebro in the final. SønderjyskE Håndbold were relegated, when they finished last in the regular season. Slagelse DH were administratively relegated to the 2nd Division (third tier), when they declared bankruptcy. There were no other relegated teams. After the season had ended, Aalborg DH were declared bankrupt, and Ringkøbing Håndbold were offered their place in the league, which they accepted.

== Team information ==
The following 12 clubs compete in the Damehåndboldligaen during the 2012–13 season:

Team	Location	Arena	Capacity
Team Esbjerg	Esbjerg	Blue Water Dokken	2,549
HC Odense	Odense	Odense Idrætshal	2,300
Aalborg DH	Aalborg	Gigantium	1,300
Midtjylland	Ikast	Ikast-Brande Arena	2,550
Frederiksberg IF	Frederiksberg	Frederiksberghallen	1,469
Randers HK	Randers	Arena Randers	3,000
Slagelse DH	Slagelse	Antvorskovhallen	1,310
Vejen EH	Vejen	Vejen Idrætscenter	
SønderjyskE	Aabenraa	Aabenraa Idrætscenter	1,480
Skive fH	Skive	Skivehallerne	
TTH	Holstebro	Gråkjær Arena	3,250
Viborg HK	Viborg	Viborg Stadionhal	3,000

== Regular season ==
=== Standings ===
Pos	Team	Pld	W	D	L	GF	GA	GD	Pts	Qualification or relegation
1	Midtjylland	20	17	2	1	537	442	+95	36	Championship Round
2	Tvis Holstebro	20	16	0	4	647	537	+110	32	Championship Round
3	Viborg HK	20	15	1	4	593	484	+109	31	Championship Round
4	Randers	20	13	1	6	547	488	+59	27	Championship Round
5	Vejen EH	20	9	3	8	512	494	+18	21	Championship Round
6	Esbjerg	20	9	2	9	531	531	0	20	Championship Round
7	Frederiksberg IF	20	6	3	11	469	516	−47	15	
8	Skive fH	20	6	2	12	533	606	−73	14	
9	SønderjyskE	20	3	2	15	496	599	−103	8	
10	Aalborg DH (Note: Aalborg DH started with -2 points due to their insolvence)	20	3	3	14	476	552	−76	7	Relegation Round
11	HC Odense	20	3	1	16	446	538	−92	7	Relegation Round
12	Slagelse DH (Note: Slagelse DH's results were cancelled, as they had been declared bankrupt.)	0	0	0	0	0	0	0	0	Relegation

Source: Flashscore

=== Results ===
Home / Away^{1}	FCM	ODE	FIF	SLA	RHK	SKI	ESB	TTH	VIB	AAL	KIF	SJE
FC Midtjylland	X	29-18	28-22	29-21	23-21	28-25	26-25	31-20	26-26	25-25	29-18	28-21
HC Odense	11-25	X	24-27		20-25	32-33	26-25	23-34	19-24	24-26	23-22	26-26
FIF	23-26	15-19	X	26-19	26-22	29-29	24-32	28-37	24-29	19-18	15-23	25-17
Slagelse DH^{2}		21-29	18-20	X		28-36	17-37		18-32	33-28	24-38	27-31
Randers HK	23-26	30-20	29-28	39-20	X	24-22	19-19	30-20	25-24	28-23	24-20	31-26
Skive fH	24-30	25-24	28-24		23-37	X	31-28	29-46	26-32	30-24	26-36	24-24
Team Esbjerg	20-21	29-28	25-25	26-17	31-35	23-21	X	34-39	28-25	28-21	21-24	28-26
Team Tvis Holstebro	22-23	34-23	32-27	41-22	32-29	38-25	30-23	X	32-29	33-19	34-23	40-23
Viborg HK	24-25	30-24	36-23		31-27	34-21	26-18	35-28	X	35-21	31-22	36-22
Aalborg DH	24-30	28-20	20-22		25-35	31-34	28-29	23-36	19-26	X	24-24	31-27
KIF Vejen	23-21	28-20	22-22	28-19	25-19	30-28	27-29	31-32	26-28	23-23	X	36-20
SønderjyskE Håndbold	29-23	23-22	20-21	27-17	24-34	32-29	29-36	27-33	28-32	29-21	25-29	X

^{1}Home teams are listed on the left, while away teams are listed along the top

^{2}_{Slagelse DH did not complete the season, following their bankruptcy 13 February 2013.}

== Championship playoffs ==
The top 6 teams from the regular season competed in two groups of three. Top two advanced to the semifinals. The first and second placed teams where awarded 1 point in each of their groups.

=== Pot 1 ===
Pos	Team	Pld	W	D	L	GF	GA	GD	Pts	Qualification
1	FCM (Note: including 1 bonus point)	4	2	1	1	96	93	+3	6	Semifinals
2	Randers HK	4	2	1	1	96	90	+6	5	Semifinals
3	Team Esbjerg	4	1	0	3	104	113	−9	2	

Source: Flashscore
Notes:

Date	Home team	Away team	Result
27/3	Team Esbjerg	Randers HK	20-27
30/3	FC Midtjylland	Team Esbjerg	28-23
3/4	Randers HK	FC Midtjylland	20-20
9/4	Team Esbjerg	FC Midtjylland	28-31
17/4	Randers HK	Team Esbjerg	27-33
20/4	FC Midtjylland	Randers HK	17-22

=== Pot 2 ===
Pos	Team	Pld	W	D	L	GF	GA	GD	Pts	Qualification
1	TTH (Note: including 1 bonus point)	4	2	0	2	111	107	+4	5	Semifinals
2	Viborg HK	4	2	0	2	105	104	+1	4	Semifinals
3	Vejen EH	4	2	0	2	109	114	−5	4	

Source: Flashscore
Notes:

Date	Home team	Away team	Result
27/3	Vejen EH	Viborg HK	28-34
30/3	Team Tvis Holstebro	Vejen EH	29-30
3/4	Viborg HK	Team Tvis Holstebro	24-26
10/4	Vejen EH	Team Tvis Holstebro	29-28
16/4	Viborg HK	Vejen EH	23-22
20/4	Team Tvis Holstebro	Viborg HK	28-24

=== Semifinals ===
Dates		Home team in the 1st match	Home team in the 2nd match	Results		
1st match	2nd match	Home team in the 1st match	Home team in the 2nd match	Aggregate	1st match	2nd match
26/4	26/4	Viborg HK	FC Midtjylland	47-50	24-24	23–26
28/4	28/4	Randers HK	TTH	54-59	28–32	26–27

=== Bronze match ===
Dates		Home team in the 1st match	Home team in the 2nd match	Results		
1st match	2nd match	Home team in the 1st match	Home team in the 2nd match	Aggregate	1st match	2nd match
2/5	8/5	Randers HK	Viborg HK	55–64	30-30	25–34

=== Final ===
Dates		Home team in the 1st match	Home team in the 2nd match	Results		
1st match	2nd match	Home team in the 1st match	Home team in the 2nd match	Aggregate	1st match	2nd match
20/5	24/5	Team Tvis Holstebro	FC Midtjylland	45-51	23–27	22–24

== Relegation playoff ==
The 7th and 8th place team from the regular season starts the relegation playoff with 2 points, number 9 and 10 start with 1 point, and the rest start with 0.

=== Group 1 ===
Pos	Team	Pld	W	D	L	GF	GA	GD	Pts	Qualification
1	SønderjyskE (Note: including 1 bonus point)	6	6	0	0	164	141	+23	13	Promotion to 2013–14 Damehåndboldligaen
2	FIF (Note: including 2 bonus point)	6	3	0	3	150	152	−2	8	Promotion to 2013–14 Damehåndboldligaen
3	Ringkøbing Håndbold	6	2	0	4	142	145	−3	4	Relegation playoff
4	Lyngby HK	6	1	0	5	133	151	−18	2	Relegation to 1st Division

Source: Flashscore

=== Group 2 ===
Pos	Team	Pld	W	D	L	GF	GA	GD	Pts	Qualification
1	Skive fH (Note: including 2 bonus point)	6	3	1	2	156	144	+12	9	Promotion to 2013–14 Damehåndboldligaen
2	HC Odense	6	4	0	2	143	130	+13	8	Promotion to 2013–14 Damehåndboldligaen
3	Aalborg DH (Note: including 1 bonus point)	6	3	0	3	144	141	+3	7	Relegation playoff
4	Silkeborg-Voel KFUM	6	1	1	4	121	149	−28	3	Relegation to 1st Division

Source: Flashscore

=== Relegation match ===
Dates		Home team in the 1st match	Home team in the 2nd match	Results		
1st match	2nd match	Home team in the 1st match	Home team in the 2nd match	Aggregate	1st match	2nd match
21/4	24/4	Aalborg DH	Ringkøbing Håndbold	58-52	27–24	31–28
