= Estavana Polman =

Dutch handball player (born 1992)

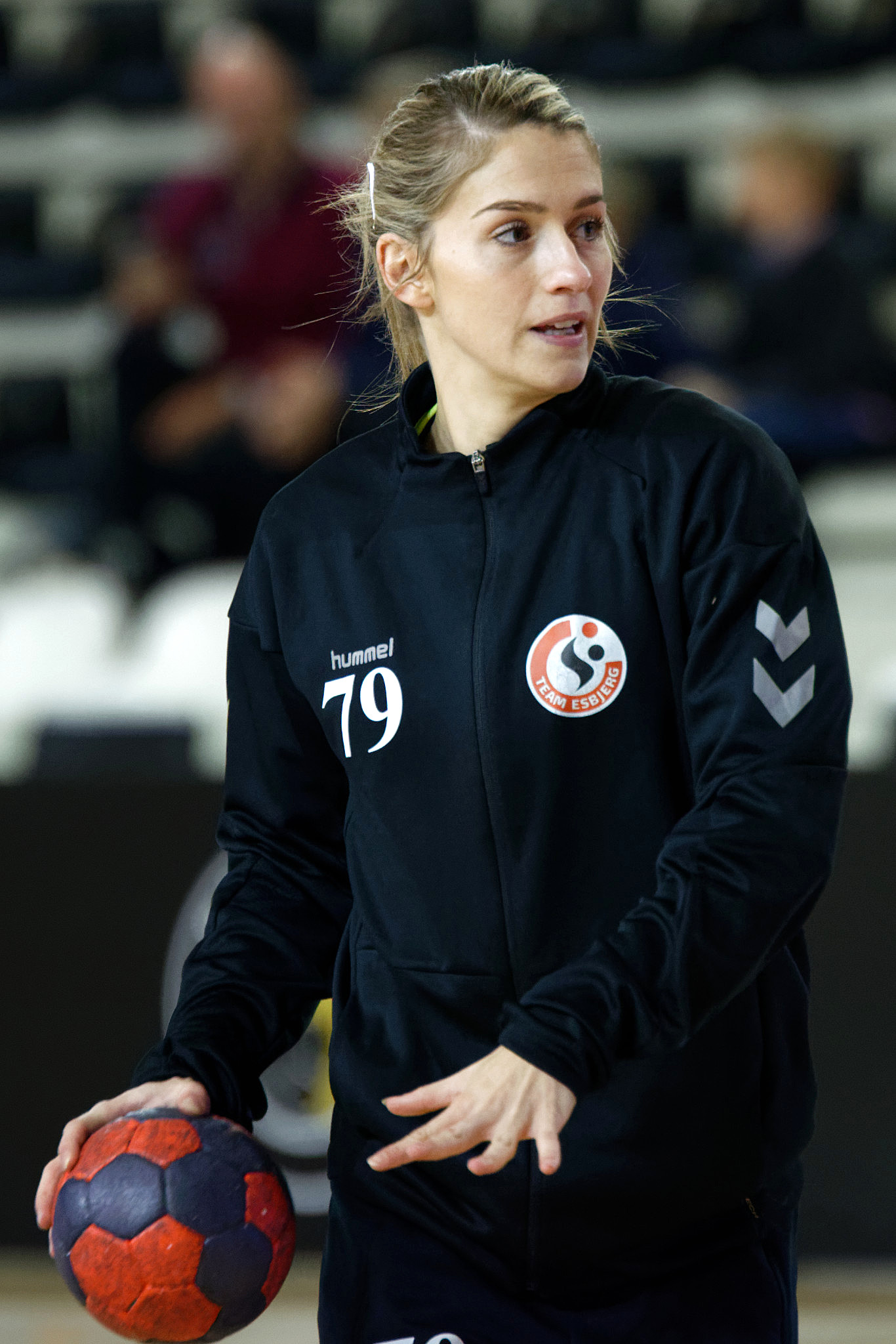

Personal information
- Nationality: Dutch
- Born: 5 August 1992 (age 34) Arnhem, Netherlands
- Height: 1.73 m (5 ft 8 in)

Sport
- Sport: Handball
- Position: Centre back
- Current club: CS Rapid București
- Number: 79

Senior clubs
- Years: Team
- 2009–2010: AAC Arnhem
- 2010–2011: VOC Amsterdam
- 2011–2013: SønderjyskE
- 2013–2022: Team Esbjerg
- 2022: Nykøbing Falster Håndboldklub
- 2022–2026: CS Rapid București
National team
| Years | Team | Apps | (Gls) |
| 2010–2025 | Netherlands | 207 | (685) |
Medal record
World Championship
| Gold medal – first place | 2019 Japan |
| Silver medal – second place | 2015 Denmark |
| Bronze medal – third place | 2017 Germany |
European Championship
| Silver medal – second place | 2016 Sweden |
| Bronze medal – third place | 2018 France |
Youth World Championship
| Bronze medal – third place | 2010 Dominican Republic |
Junior European Championship
| Silver medal – second place | 2011 Netherlands |

Estavana Polman (born 5 August 1992) is a Dutch handball player for CS Rapid București and the Dutch national team. She is broadly considered one of the best Dutch players of all time and has become a symbol of the Netherlands' rise from handball minnows to one of the best teams in the world.

She was a part the Netherlands team that won the 2019 World Women's Handball Championship; the first title in the country's history as well as the team that won their first ever medals at the 2015 World Women's Handball Championship.

== Career ==
Polman started her career at her hometown club AAC Arnhem where she played from 2005 to 2010. She then joined VOC Amsterdam for a single season. In 2011 she joined Danish second-tier side SønderjyskE. In her first season she was promoted with the club to the Damehåndboldligaen. The same season she was the league MVP.

In 2013 she joined Team Esbjerg. In 2016 she was part of the Team Esbjerg side that won the Danish Championship for the first time in club history. In 2019 she won the Danish Championship for a second tme. In 2020 she had cruciate ligament injury which kept her out for most of the 2020–21 season. Upon her return she won the 2021 Danish Cup. In total she played 240 games for Team Esbjerg scoring 1270 goals.

In March 2022 she left Team Esbjerg on mutual agreement despite her contract running until 2023. In July the same year she joined Nykøbing Falster Håndboldklub. She played here for half a season before joining Romanian side CS Rapid București in November 2022 when they triggered a release clause in Polman's contract.

In April 2026 she announced her retirement after the 2025–26 season.

== National team ==
She represented the Netherlands in younger age categories as well and collected the silver medal at the 2011 Women's U-19 European Handball Championship. In addition, she was voted into the all-star team of the tournament in playmaker position.

At the 2015 World Championship she was part of the Dutch team that won Netherlands' first ever medals when they won silver.

She was surprisingly not included in the Dutch team for the 2024 European Championship. She did however return to the Dutch team in March 2025. In November 2025 she announced her intention to retire from the national team after the 2025 World Championship, together with Lois Abbingh. Netherlands finished fourth after losing to eventual winners Norway in the semifinal and losing narrowly to France after extra time in the bronze match.

== Personal life ==
Since August 2016, she has been in a relationship with Dutch footballer Rafael van der Vaart. On 27 December 2016, they announced that they are expecting a child. On 24 June 2017, she gave birth to a 3 kg baby girl, Jesslynn.

Estavana's twin brother Dario is also a handball player.

== Honours ==
- Danish Championship:
  - Gold: 2016
  - Gold: 2019
  - Gold: 2020
  - Silver: 2015
- Danish Cup
  - Gold: 2017
  - Gold: 2021
- Danish Super Cup
  - Gold: 2015
  - Gold: 2019

== Awards and recognition ==
- All-Star Playmaker of the Women's 19 European Championship: 2011
- Danish League Top Scorer: 2013, 2014, 2019
- All-Star Left Back of the Danish League: 2019
- MVP of the World Championship: 2019
- All Star Best player of the Danish 1st Division: 2011/12
- All-Star Centre Back of the World Championship: 2019
