= Mette Gravholt =

Danish handball player (born 1984)

Personal information
- Full name: Mette Bjørholm Gravholt
- Nationality: Danish
- Born: 12 December 1984 (age 41) Egtved, Denmark
- Height: 1.72 m (5 ft 8 in)

Sport
- Sport: Handball
- Position: Pivot
- Current club: Retired
- Number: 6

Youth career
- Years: Team
- –: Egtved IF
- –: Ikast Håndbold
- –: KIF Vejen

Senior clubs
- Years: Team
- –2008: Roar Roskilde
- 2008: Slagelse FH
- 2008–2010: Roar Roskilde
- 2010–2014: Team Tvis Holstebro
- 2014–2015: Viborg HK
- 2015–2017: Nykøbing Falster HK
- 2017–2018: Neckarsulmer SU
- 2018: Team Esbjerg
- 2018: Fredericia HK
National team
| Years | Team | Apps | (Gls) |
| 2011–2016 | Denmark | 53 | (131) |
Medal record
World Championship
| Bronze medal – third place | 2013 Serbia |

Mette Gravholt (born 12 December 1984) is a Danish retired handball player who played for Danish national team.

== Club career ==
=== Early career ===
Gravholt started playing handball aged 5 at Egtved IF. She later joined the youth team at Ikast Håndbold, followed by KIF Vejen. Later she joined the Danish 2nd tier team Roskilde Håndbold. In the 2007-08 she was the topscorer with 218 goals, which prompted a move to Slagelse FH. But due to the club having financial difficulties, she quickly returned to Roskilde.

=== TTH ===
In 2010 she joined Team Tvis Holstebro in the top Danish league. In 2011 she reached the final of the EHF Cup, where they lost to league rivals FC Midtjylland Håndbold. In 2013 she would go on to win the cup, which was the first in club history.

In the 2011–12 season she was the topscorer in the Danish top league. In the 2013-14 Season she was selected for the Danish League all star team.

=== Viborg HK ===
In 2014 she joined Viborg HK.

=== NFH ===
In 2015 she joined Nykøbing Falster Håndboldklub. Here she won the 2017 Danish Championship, the first in club history. Gravholt selected for the league all star team for the season.

In 2017 she joined Romanian team Dinamo Bucharest, but when the team failed to get promoted to the top Romanian league, she cancelled the transfer and instead announced her retirement.

=== Comeback from retirement ===
In November 2017 she came out of retirement to join German team Neckarsulmer Sport-Union. She left the club in February 2018 for personal reasons, and joined Danish side Team Esbjerg. She retired at the end of the 2017–18 season.

== National team ==
Gravholt's first major international tournament was the 2012 European Championship, where Denmark finished 5th.

At the 2013 World Championship, she was a part of the Danish team that won bronze medals, breaking a 9-year streak without medals for the Danish team. They beat Poland 30–26.

== Private ==
Gravholt is openly lesbian. She met Betina Lambæk, with whom she has a son Matteo who was born via ivf in 2017. The couple got married in July 2018.

Soon after her wedding, Gravholt announced her retirement as a professional handball player, and started a new job at a primary school in Kolding, where she works as a 1st grade teacher.

== International honours ==
- World Championship:
  - Bronze Medalist: 2013
- EHF Cup:
  - Winner: 2013
  - Finalist: 2011

== Individual awards ==
- Danish League Top Scorer: 2011-12
- Danish League Best Pivot: 2013, 2014, 2016
