= 2014–15 Damehåndboldligaen =

Damehåndboldligaen
- Season: 2014–15
- Champions: FC Midtjylland
- Relegated: Nykøbing F. Skive fH (Bankrupt)
- Champions League: FC Midtjylland, Team Esbjerg
- EHF Cup: HC Odense, Randers HK, Silkeborg-Voel KFUM
- Cup Winners' Cup: Team Tvis Holstebro, Viborg HK
- Matches: 146
- Goals: 7,479 (51.23 per match)
- Top goalscorer: (Denmark) Jette Hansen (164)
- Biggest home win: Randers HK 40-21 Silkeborg-Voel
- Biggest away win: Nykøbing F. 20-37 Team Tvis Holstebro
- Highest scoring: Silkeborg-Voel 36-31 Skive fH

The 2014–15 Damehåndboldligaen (known as the Boxer Dameligaen for sponsorship reasons) was the 79th season of the Damehåndboldligaen, Denmark's premier Handball league. The reigning champions were Viborg HK.

FC Midtjylland won the title, when they beat Team Esbjerg in the final.

In April Skive fH decided to withdraw their team from the league, and was therefore administratively relegated. Nykøbing Falster were relegated as well, when they finished last in the regular season.

== Team information ==
Locations of the 2014–15 Damehåndboldligaen

The following 12 clubs compete in the Damehåndboldligaen during the 2014–15 season:

Team	Location	Arena	Capacity
Team Esbjerg	Esbjerg	Blue Water Dokken	2,549
HC Odense	Odense	Odense Idrætshal	2,300
København	Copenhagen	Frederiksberghallen	1,767
Midtjylland	Ikast	Ikast-Brande Arena	2,550
Nykøbing Falster	Nykøbing Falster	Scandlines Arena	1,300
Randers	Randers	Arena Randers	3,000
Ringkøbing	Ringkøbing	Rofi-Centret	1,100
Silkeborg-Voel	Silkeborg	Jysk Arena	3,000
SK Århus	Århus	Den Lille Kro Arena	1,152
Skive fH	Skive	Skivehallerne	
Tvis Holstebro	Holstebro	Gråkjær Arena	3,250
Viborg HK	Viborg	Viborg Stadionhal	3,000

=== Personnel and kits ===
Following is the list of clubs competing in 2014–15 Damehåndboldligaen, with their manager, captain, kit manufacturer and shirt sponsor.

Team	President	Head coach	Kit manufacturer	Shirt sponsor
Esbjerg	Per Kristiansen	(Denmark) Lars Frederiksen	hummel	Workpoint
HC Odense	Arne Buch	(Denmark) Flemming Larsen	hummel	—
København		(Denmark) Martin Albertsen	Kappa	—
Midtjylland	Hans Peter Riis	(Denmark) Helle Thomsen	ASICS	ALPI
Nykøbing Falster	Søren Jakobsen	(Denmark) Kenneth Sahlholdt	Puma	PrinceRunner, Border Shop
Randers	Henrik Mortensen	(Denmark) Ulrik Kirkely	Puma	Sparkassen Kronjylland
Ringkøbing	Kim Grøn Hansen	(Denmark) Allan Heine	hummel	Vestjysk Bank
Silkeborg-Voel	Lars Buchreitz Thygesen	(Denmark) Jacob Andreasen	adidas	
SK Århus	Thomas Gielfeldt	(United Kingdom) Jesper Holmris	hummel	Nybolig, BDO
Skive fH		(Denmark) Ryan Zinglersen	Kempa	Coloquick, Rent Liv
Tvis Holstebro	Jacob Jørgensen	(Denmark) Niels Agesen Nielsen	hummel	Vestjysk Bank
Viborg HK	Peter Cassøe	(Denmark) Christian Dalmose	hummel	Maj Invest, BORUP, Sport 24

== Regular season ==
=== Standings ===
Pos	Team	Pld	W	D	L	GF	GA	GD	Pts	Qualification or relegation
1	Esbjerg	22	17	3	2	639	532	+107	37	Championship Round
2	Midtjylland	22	17	2	3	579	446	+133	36	Championship Round
3	Tvis Holstebro	22	15	1	6	617	506	+111	31	Championship Round
4	Viborg HK	22	12	3	7	587	545	+42	27	Championship Round
5	Silkeborg-Voel KFUM	22	12	1	9	555	576	−21	25	Championship Round
6	Randers	22	10	3	9	559	531	+28	23	Championship Round
7	HC Odense	22	10	1	11	544	566	−22	21	
8	SK Århus	22	8	2	12	561	564	−3	18	
9	København Håndbold	22	6	3	13	501	560	−59	15	
10	Ringkøbing Håndbold	22	6	1	15	488	589	−101	13	Relegation Round
11	Skive fH	22	5	2	15	534	644	−110	12	Relegation Round
12	Nykøbing F.	22	2	2	18	458	563	−105	6	Relegation

Source: Flashscore

=== Results ===
Home \ Away	FCM	ODE	KØB	NFH	RHK	SKI	ESB	TTH	VIB	RIN	SIL	AAR
FC Midtjylland		27–21	32–26	34–22	22–14	36–19	28–21	19–23	28–21	23–17	28–19	30–18
HC Odense	20–26		20–24	26–21	23–24	28–32	23–31	25–30	26–25	35–22	28–24	29–27
København Håndbold	22–22	20–20		22–22	27–28	33–24	25–27	18–34	23–19	24–17	23–28	25–23
NFH	15–28	22–28	18–19		21–21	30–21	20–26	22–24	26–27	17–20	24–32	21–25
Randers HK	22–18	24–25	36–25	32–21		29–22	29–30	18–17	21–21	20–21	40–21	17–25
Skive fH	19–29	25–28	32–22	24–20	27–26		23–36	23–26	26–33	24–24	23–23	25–29
Team Esbjerg	21–21	32–21	25–18	22–14	34–28	34–21		30–30	25–25	35–29	29–32	28–25
Team Tvis Holstebro	16–22	33–19	35–24	37–20	28–23	36–21	26–27		23–26	33–26	24–28	24–22
Viborg HK	29–17	26–22	28–22	26–20	28–31	30–21	21–32	27–30		35–22	25–23	27–25
Ringkøbing Håndbold	19–32	22–26	21–16	19–15	26–25	25–26	24–32	13–30	25–34		23–24	25–34
Silkeborg-Voel KFUM	19–26	26–20	21–20	28–24	26–28	36–31	21–32	25–31	31–28	22–20		25–22
SK Aarhus	23–31	23–31	28–23	22–23	23–23	31–25	28–30	28–27	26–26	27–28	27–21	

Source: Flashscore
Legend: Blue = home team win; Yellow = draw; Red = away team win.

== Championship playoffs ==
=== Quarterfinal ===
Dates		Home team in the 1st match	Home team in the 2nd match	Results		
1st match	2nd match	Home team in the 1st match	Home team in the 2nd match	Aggregate	1st match	2nd match
26/3	02/4	Silkeborg-Voel	Team Tvis Holstebro	54-66	24-35	31-30
25/3	29/3	Randers HK	Viborg HK	40-50	18-20	30-22

=== Semifinal ===
Dates		Home team in the 1st match	Home team in the 2nd match	Results		
1st match	2nd match	Home team in the 1st match	Home team in the 2nd match	Aggregate	1st match	2nd match
22/4	25/4	Team Tvis Holstebro	FC Midtjylland	47-56	19-25	28-31
23/4	26/4	Viborg HK	Team Esbjerg	53-55	25-26	28-29

=== Bronze match ===
Dates		Home team in the 1st match	Home team in the 2nd match	Results		
1st match	2nd match	Home team in the 1st match	Home team in the 2nd match	Aggregate	1st match	2nd match
17/5	21/5	Viborg HK	Team Tvis Holstebro	60-65	32-32	28-33

=== Final ===
Dates		Home team in the 1st match	Home team in the 2nd match	Results		
1st match	2nd match	Home team in the 1st match	Home team in the 2nd match	Aggregate	1st match	2nd match
16/5	23/5	FC Midtjylland	Team Esbjerg	45-44	23-22	22-22

== Relegation playoff ==
=== Group 1 ===
Dates		Home team in the 1st match	Home team in the 2nd match	Results		
1st match	2nd match	Home team in the 1st match	Home team in the 2nd match	Aggregate	1st match	2nd match
28/3	6/4	Ajax Copenhagen	Ringkøbing Håndbold	47-52	24-24	28-23

W1D= Women's 1st Division
DHL= Damehåndboldligaen

=== Group 2 ===
Dates		Home team in the 1st match	Home team in the 2nd match	Results		
1st match	2nd match	Home team in the 1st match	Home team in the 2nd match	Aggregate	1st match	2nd match
28/3	2/4	Vendsyssel Håndbold	Skive fH	56-67	28-34	33-28

W1D= Women's 1st Division
DHL= Damehåndboldligaen

== All Star Team ==
- Goalkeeper: (Germany) Sabine Englert (FCM)
- Left Wing: (Denmark) Ann Grete Nørgaard (THH)
- Left Back: (Denmark) Jette Hansen (SIL)
- Centre Back: (Netherlands) Nycke Groot (FCM)
- Pivot: (Denmark) Sarah Iversen (HCO)
- Right Back: (Denmark) Anne Cecilie De La Cour (SIL)
- Right Wing: (Denmark) Trine Østergaard Jensen (FCM)

=== Coach of the season ===
(Denmark) Lars Frederiksen - Team Esbjerg

== Top goalscorers ==
Statistics.

As of 24 May 2015

Rank	Player	Team	Goals
1	(Denmark) Jette Hansen	Silkeborg-Voel KFUM	164
2	(Denmark) Ann Grete Nørgaard	Team Tvis Holstebro	162
3	(Denmark) Olivera Jurisic	Skive fH	143
4	(Denmark) Anne Cecilie de la Cour	Silkeborg-Voel KFUM	142
4	(Sweden) Nathalie Hagman	Team Tvis Holstebro	142
6	(Denmark) Louise Burgaard	Viborg HK	132
6	(Netherlands) Nycke Groot	FCM Håndbold	132
8	(Sweden) Johanna Westberg	Randers HK	119
9	(Denmark) Anne Mette Hansen	København Håndbold	114
10	(Denmark) Kristina Kristiansen	Team Tvis Holstebro	113

== Number of teams by regions ==
#	Regions	No. teams	Teams
1	Midtjylland	8	Midtjylland, Randers, Ringkøbing, Silkeborg-Voel, SK Århus, Skive fH, Tvis Holstebro and Viborg HK
2	Syddanmark	2	Esbjerg and HC Odense
3	Hovedstaden	1	København
3	Sjælland	1	Nykøbing Falster
