= Jakob Andreasen (handball coach) =

Danish team handball coach (born 1976)

Personal information
- Full name: Jakob Andreasen
- Nationality: Danish
- Born: 16 January 1976 (age 50) Silkeborg, Denmark
- Height: 178 cm (70 in)

Sport
- Sport: Handball
- Current club: Silkeborg-Voel KFUM (director)

Teams managed
- Years: Team
- 2006-2023: Silkeborg-Voel KFUM
- 2007-2011: Greenland (men)
- 2011-2016: Greenland (women)

Jakob Andreasen (born 16 January 1976) is a Danish team handball coach and sports director. He was the head coach for Silkeborg-Voel KFUM from 2006 to 2023. In the fall of 2022 he became the director of the club as well as head coach. In February 2023 he stepped down as coach to focus on being the director at the club full time. When he finished his tenure, he was the longest sitting head coach in the Danish women's handball league. When he took over the position, the club was midtable in the Danish first division, and he managed to guide them to promotion to the highest tier in 2014.

He formerly coached the Greenlandic women's national team and Greenlandic men's national team.

His father, Morten Andreassen, was the chairperson at Silkeborg-Voel for 19 years. He is the uncle of handball player Natasja Andreasen.
