= Jette Hansen (handballer) =

Danish handball player (born 1987)

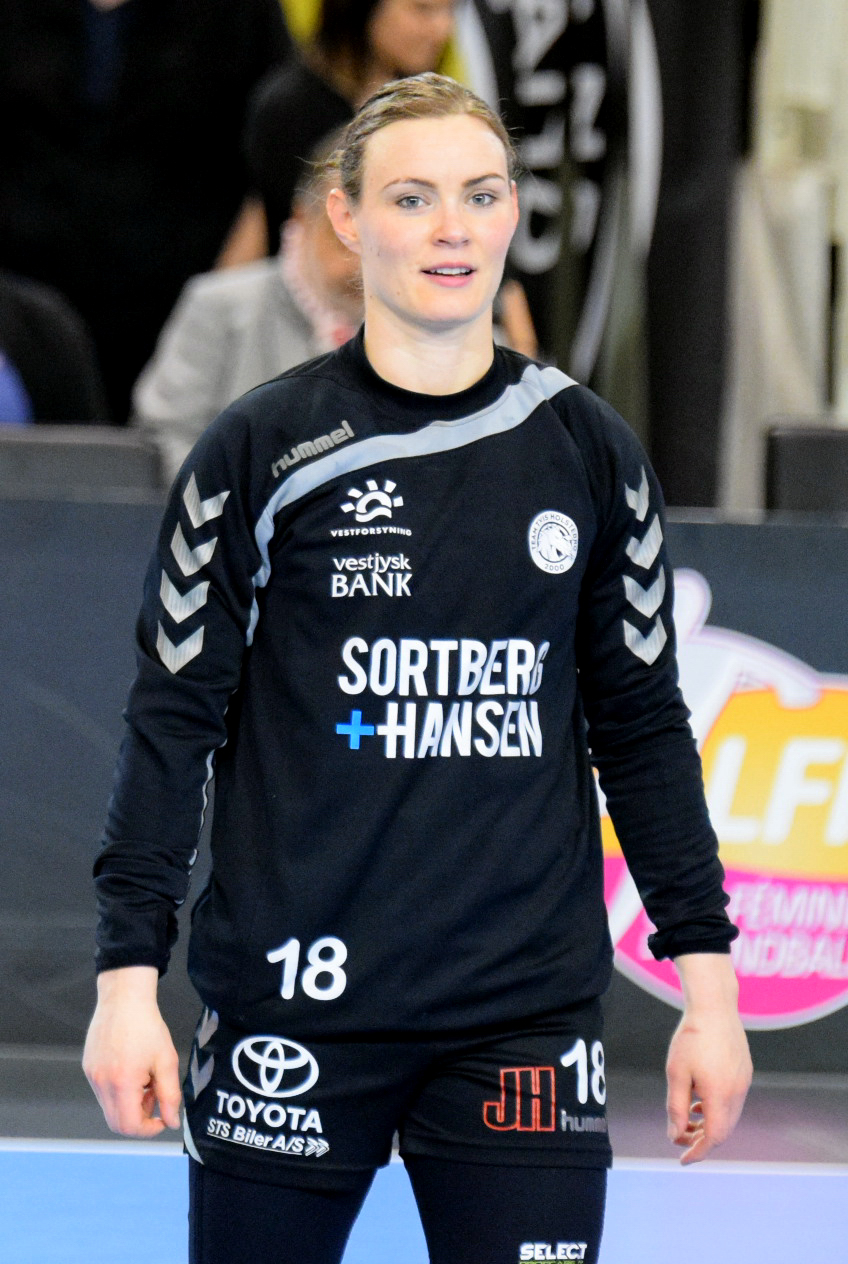

Personal information
- Full name: Jette Hansen
- Nationality: Danish
- Born: 21 July 1987 (age 39) Ry, Denmark
- Height: 170 cm (67 in)

Sport
- Sport: Handball
- Position: Left back

Senior clubs
- Years: Team
- –: Knudsø HK
- –: Horsens HK
- 2005–2007: GOG Svendborg
- 2009–2012: Silkeborg-Voel KFUM
- 2012–2014: KIF Vejen
- 2014–2015: Silkeborg-Voel KFUM
- 2015–2016: Team Tvis Holstebro
- 2016–2018: Silkeborg-Voel KFUM
National team
Years	Team	Apps	(Gls)
2014–2015	Denmark	7	(27)

Jette Hansen (born 21 July 1987) is a former female Danish handball player who last played for Silkeborg-Voel KFUM, until 2018.

== International honours ==
- EHF Cup Winners' Cup:
  - Winner: 2016

== Individual awards ==
- All-Star Left Back of the Danish Handball League: 2015
- Top Scorer of the Danish Handball League: 2015
