= Sara Keçeci =

Turkish-Danish handball player (born 1994)

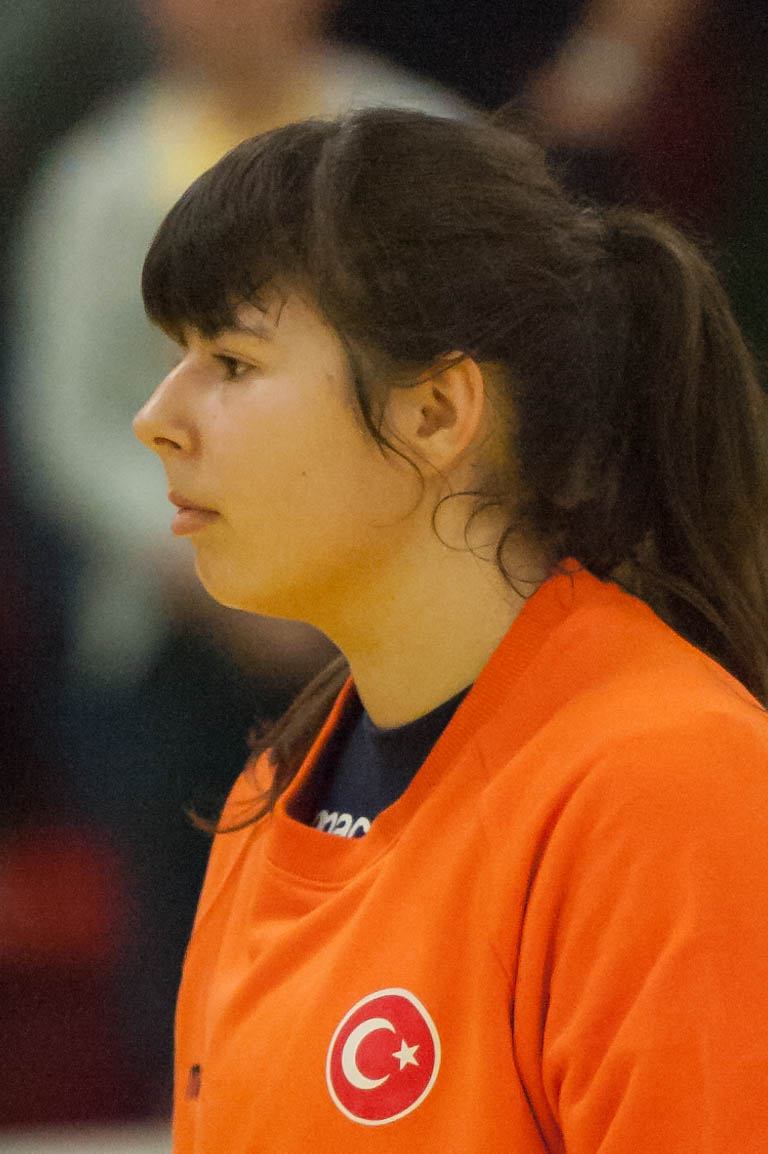
- Sara Keçeci at the 2015 World Women's Handball Championship qualification.

Personal information
- Nationality: Danish, Turkish
- Born: 21 October 1994 (age 31) Sønderborg, Denmark
- Height: 1.75 m (5 ft 9 in)

Sport
- Sport: Handball
- Position: Goalkeeper
- Current club: Hadsten Håndbold
- Number: 12

Senior clubs
- Years: Team
- 2012–2013; 2013–2014; 2014–2016; 2016–2018: KIF Vejen; Vejen EH; Silkeborg-Voel KFUM; Hadsten Sports Klub Håndbold
- 2018-: Holstebro Håndbold
National team
| Years | Team | Apps |
| 2011; 2014; 2014– | Turkey U-17; Turkey U-20; Turkey | 3 |
- Updated on 8 October 2015

Sara Keçeci (born 21 October 1994) is a Turkish-Danish female handballer playing in goalkeeper position. She has dual citizenship but plays internationally as a member of the Turkish national team.

== Early years ==
Sara was born in Sønderborg, Denmark to Mehmet Keçeci, a Turkish father, who immigrated from Diyarbakır in 1991, and a Danish mother. Her father works in a plant that manufactures agricultural machinery, and her mother is a primary school teacher. Her father is a former footballer and basketball player, and also serves as an official at a local sports club's football team.

At age five, Sara Keçeci began playing football. When she grew up, her mother drew Sara's interest to handball because she did not want her daughter to play with boys anymore. At age ten, Sara switched mainly to handball, however continued to play football in her Hørup school team at the same time. Inspired while watching a handball match of the Turkey women's national team at a European championship in Denmark, her interest for handball was strengthened.

== Sports career ==
=== Club ===
During her high school years, she played in the Hørup Central School's girls' handball team. Later, Keçeci was with the Danish Women's Handball League teams KIF Vejen in 2012–13 and Vejen EH in 2013–14. After her club went bankrupt, she signed in July 2014 for Silkeborg-Voel KFUM.

She was appointed also goalkeeper coach of the youth teams of girls U-14, U-16 and U-18 in her club Silkeborg-Voel for the 2015–16 season.

== National team ==
She was called up to Turkey girls' U-17 team debuting Handball at the 2011 European Youth Summer Olympic Festival in Trabzon, Turkey.

Sara Keçeci became a member of the Turkey team and took part in the qualifications round matches of the 2014 European Championship, 2015 World Championship and 2016 European Championship. On 8 October 2015 she played in the European Championship match for Turkey against the Danish women in her homeland Denmark.

== See also ==
- Turkish women in sports
