= 2013–14 Damehåndboldligaen =

Damehåndboldligaen
- Season: 2013–14
- Champions: Viborg HK
- Relegated: Nykøbing F. SønderjyskE Håndbold
- Champions League: Viborg HK
- Top goalscorer: (Netherlands) Estavana Polman (153)
- Biggest home win: Viborg HK 39-21 SønderjyskE
- Biggest away win: Nykøbing F. 15-31 Viborg HK
- Highest scoring: Team Esbjerg 35-40 Skive fH

The 2013–14 Damehåndboldligaen (known as the GuldBageren ligaen for sponsorship reasons) was the 78th season of the Damehåndboldligaen, Denmark's premier Handball league. København Håndbold were the promoted team from the 1st Division for the first time in club history. The reigning champions were FC Midtjylland Håndbold.

A week before the league start Aalborg DH where declared bankrupt, and Ringkøbing Håndbold were offered their place in the league, which they accepted.

Viborg HK won the title, when they beat FC Midtjylland in the final. SønderjyskE Håndbold were relegated, when they finished last in the regular season. Nykøbing Falster Håndboldklub should have been relegated when they lost the relegation playoff to SK Aarhus, but they were saved by Vejen EH's bankruptcy.

== Team information ==
The following 12 clubs compete in the Damehåndboldligaen during the 2013–14 season:

Team	Location	Arena	Capacity
Team Esbjerg	Esbjerg	Blue Water Dokken	2,549
HC Odense	Odense	Odense Idrætshal	2,300
København	Copenhagen	Frederiksberghallen	1,767
Midtjylland	Ikast	Ikast-Brande Arena	2,550
Nykøbing Falster	Nykøbing Falster	Scandlines Arena	1,300
Randers	Randers	Arena Randers	3,000
Ringkøbing	Ringkøbing	Rofi-Centret	1,100
Vejen EH	Vejen	Vejen Idrætscenter	
SønderjyskE	Aabenraa	Aabenraa Idrætscenter	1,480
Skive fH	Skive	Skivehallerne	
TTH	Holstebro	Gråkjær Arena	3,250
Viborg HK	Viborg	Viborg Stadionhal	3,000

== Regular season ==
=== Standings ===
Pos	Team	Pld	W	D	L	GF	GA	GD	Pts	Qualification or relegation
1	Viborg HK	22	19	1	2	697	523	+174	39	Championship Round
2	Midtjylland	22	17	2	3	588	502	+86	36	Championship Round
3	Randers	22	16	1	5	615	533	+82	33	Championship Round
4	Esbjerg	22	16	0	6	649	602	+47	32	Championship Round
5	Tvis Holstebro	22	14	1	7	644	591	+53	29	Championship Round
6	HC Odense	22	10	2	10	565	582	−17	22	Championship Round
7	Vejen EH	22	10	0	12	546	555	−9	20	
8	Skive fH	22	9	1	12	623	632	−9	19	
9	København Håndbold	22	6	1	15	491	565	−74	13	
10	Ringkøbing Håndbold	22	4	2	16	486	606	−120	10	Relegation Round
11	Nykøbing F.	22	2	2	18	480	578	−98	6	Relegation Round
12	SønderjyskE	22	2	1	19	525	640	−115	5	Relegation

Source: Flashscore

=== Results ===
Home / Away^{1}	FCM	ODE	KØB	NFH	RHK	SKI	ESB	TTH	VIB	RIN	VEH	SJE
FC Midtjylland	X	35-26	29-20	35-23	19-19	26-22	24-27	21-16	24-33	32-20	23-16	28-21
HC Odense	21-27	X	19-22	27-25	22-31	31-23	26-30	30-31	27-27	29-22	32-29	24-22
København Håndbold	21-24	17-23	X	22-21	19-27	22-24	23-29	26-24	21-30	21-21	22-25	27-21
NFH	23-25	23-23	23-24	X	24-28	24-25	19-26	25-28	15-31	19-21	20-25	27-26
Randers HK	25-32	29-25	27-22	30-14	X	32-29	27-22	25-17	28-38	33-20	21-20	31-16
Skive fH	28-33	30-32	29-25	24-24	30-37	X	30-34	28-38	24-27	31-20	25-18	33-26
Team Esbjerg	26-30	23-20	32-28	35-25	26-28	35-40	X	35-33	30-28	29-23	34-26	32-29
TTH	23-23	34-33	25-21	33-23	34-25	37-35	33-25	X	30-37	33-19	30-26	34-31
Viborg HK	29-26	38-27	32-19	24-18	28-27	35-25	37-23	27-24	X	37-20	29-25	39-21
Ringkøbing	17-22	17-18	28-22	24-20	23-29	25-37	27-32	23-29	19-32	X	23-17	27-27
Vejen EH	18-20	23-24	27-18	23-19	28-24	27-23	23-32	33-30	23-34	34-26	X	29-18
SønderjyskE	28-30	24-26	25-29	20-26	25-32	24-28	23-32	20-28	27-25	23-22	28-31	X

^{1}Home teams is listed on the left, while away teams are listed along the top.

== Championship playoffs ==
=== Quarterfinal ===
Dates		Home team in the 1st match	Home team in the 2nd match	Results		
1st match	2nd match	Home team in the 1st match	Home team in the 2nd match	Aggregate	1st match	2nd match
2/4	9/4	HC Odense	Randers HK	45-51	19-25	26-26
2/4	9/4	TTH	Team Esbjerg	51-55	27-33	34-32

=== Semifinal ===
Dates		Home team in the 1st match	Home team in the 2nd match	Results		
1st match	2nd match	Home team in the 1st match	Home team in the 2nd match	Aggregate	1st match	2nd match
19/4	26/4	Team Esbjerg	Viborg HK	48-54	25-29	23-25
20/4	27/4	Randers HK	FC Midtjylland	46-50	23-25	23-25

=== Bronze match ===
Dates		Home team in the 1st match	Home team in the 2nd match	Results		
1st match	2nd match	Home team in the 1st match	Home team in the 2nd match	Aggregate	1st match	2nd match
15/5	21/5	Team Esbjerg	Randers HK	51-55	23-24	28-31

=== Final ===
Dates		Home team in the 1st match	Home team in the 2nd match	Results		
1st match	2nd match	Home team in the 1st match	Home team in the 2nd match	Aggregate	1st match	2nd match
15/5	21/5	FC Midtjylland	Team Esbjerg	46-47	25-23	21-24

== Relegation playoff ==
=== Group 1 ===
Dates		Home team in the 1st match	Home team in the 2nd match	Results		
1st match	2nd match	Home team in the 1st match	Home team in the 2nd match	Aggregate	1st match	2nd match
5/4	13/4	Ajax Copenhagen	Ringkøbing Håndbold	39-50	17-25	22-25

W1D= Women's 1st Division
DHL= Damehåndboldligaen

=== Group 2 ===
Dates		Home team in the 1st match	Home team in the 2nd match	Results		
1st match	2nd match	Home team in the 1st match	Home team in the 2nd match	Aggregate	1st match	2nd match
6/4	11/4	SK Aarhus	NFH	49-43	26-21	23-22

W1D= Women's 1st Division
DHL= Damehåndboldligaen

== Coach of the season ==
(Denmark) Jan Leslie - Randers HK

== Number of teams by regions ==
#	Regions	No. teams	Teams
1	Midtjylland	7	Midtjylland, Randers, Ringkøbing, Vejen EH, Skive fH, Tvis Holstebro and Viborg HK
2	Syddanmark	3	Esbjerg, HC Odense and SønderjyskE
3	Hovedstaden	1	København
3	Sjælland	1	Nykøbing Falster
