= Filippa Idéhn =

Swedish handball player (born 1990)

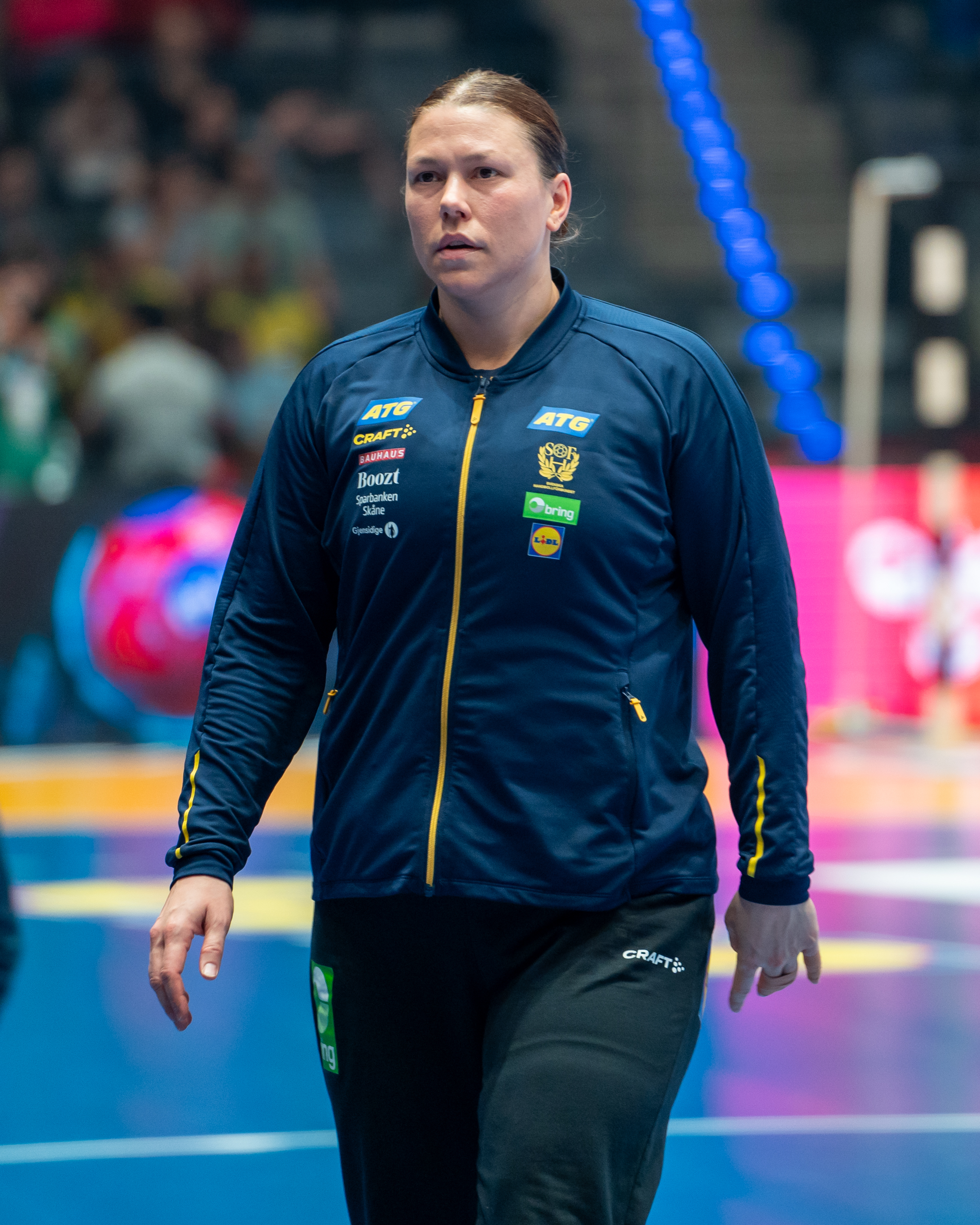

Personal information
- Nationality: Swedish
- Born: 15 August 1990 (age 36) Jönköping, Sweden
- Height: 1.83 m (6 ft 0 in)

Sport
- Sport: Handball
- Position: Goalkeeper
- Current club: Ikast Håndbold

Senior clubs
- Years: Team
- –2007: IK Cyrus
- 2007–2008: IF Hallby HK
- 2008–2009: Sävsjö HK
- 2009–2012: Spårvägens HF
- 2012–2015: IK Sävehof
- 2015–2017: Team Esbjerg
- 2017–2019: Brest Bretagne Handball
- 2019–2020: Silkeborg-Voel KFUM
- 2020–2021: Minaur Baia Mare
- 2021–2023: Silkeborg-Voel KFUM
- 2023–: Ikast Håndbold
National team
Years	Team	Apps	(Gls)
2011–	Sweden	131	(11)
Medal record
European Championship
Bronze medal – third place	2014 Croatia/Hungary

Filippa Idéhn (born 15 August 1990) is a Swedish professional handballer who plays as a goalkeeper for Ikast Håndbold and the Swedish national team.

She was part of the Team Esbjerg side that won the 2015-16 Damehåndboldligaen, the first national championship in club history.

== International achievements ==
- European Championship:
  - Bronze Medalist: 2014
- Carpathian Trophy:
  - Winner: 2015
