= Nora Persson =

Norwegian handball player (born 1999)

Personal information
- Full name: Nora Persson
- Nationality: Swedish
- Born: 10 February 1999 (age 27) Lund, Sweden
- Height: 1.76 m (5 ft 9 in)

Sport
- Sport: Handball
- Position: Goalkeeper
- Current club: Aarhus United
- Number: 12

Senior clubs
- Years: Team
- 2018–2019: Kristianstad Handboll
- 2019–2023: Aarhus United
- 2023–: SønderjyskE
National team
Years	Team	Apps	(Gls)
2022–	Sweden	1	(0)

Nora Persson (born 10 February 1999) is a Swedish handball player who plays for SønderjyskE in the Danish league, Damehåndboldligaen, and the Swedish national team.

She moved to Denmark to join Aarhus United in 2019, where she played for 4 years, before joining SønderjyskE.

She made her debut on the Swedish national team on 20 March 2022, against Iceland.
