= Andrea West Bendtsen =

Danish handball player (born 1999)

Personal information
- Nationality: Danish
- Born: 9 June 1999 (age 27) Voel, Denmark
- Height: 1.77 m (5 ft 10 in)

Sport
- Sport: Handball
- Position: Left back
- Current club: Holstebro Håndbold
- Number: 20

Youth career
- Years: Team
- 2013-2014: Silkeborg-Voel KFUM
- 2014-2017: Midtjylland Håndbold

Senior clubs
- Years: Team
- 2017-2019: Silkeborg-Voel KFUM
- 2019-2020: Holstebro Håndbold
- 2022-: Silkeborg-Voel KFUM
Medal record
Women's handball
Representing Denmark
Youth World Championship
Silver medal – second place	2016 Slovakia
U-17 European Championship
Gold medal – first place	2015 Macedonia
U-19 European Championship
Silver medal – second place	2017 Slovenia

Andrea West Bendtsen (born 9 June 1999) is a Danish handball player who currently plays for Silkeborg-Voel KFUM. She previously played for Holstebro Håndbold for one season.

She has also been a member of the Denmark junior national team.
