= Maria Holm (handballer) =

Danish handball player (born 2001)

Personal information
- Full name: Maria Krogh Holm
- Nationality: Danish
- Born: 17 October 2001 (age 25) Horsens, Denmark
- Height: 1.73 m (5 ft 8 in)

Sport
- Sport: Handball
- Position: Right back
- Current club: Silkeborg-Voel KFUM
- Number: 4

Youth career
- Years: Team
- 2018-2021: HH Elite

Senior clubs
- Years: Team
- 2020–2023: HH Elite
- 2023–: Silkeborg-Voel KFUM
National team
Years	Team	Apps	(Gls)
2019–	Denmark Beach	25	(165)
Medal record
Women's beach handball
World Championships
Silver medal – second place	2026 Croatia
World Beach Games
Gold medal – first place	2019 Qatar	Team
- Updated on 9 January 2026

Maria Krogh Holm (born 17 October 2001) is Danish handball player, who plays for Silkeborg-Voel KFUM in the top Danish division, Damehåndboldligaen. She also represent the Denmark women's national beach handball team.

== Career ==
=== Beach handball ===
Outside of indoor handball she has also featured on the Danish beach handball national team. In 2019 were part of the Danish team, who won the 2019 World Beach Games in Doha. She also participated at the 2024 Women's Beach Handball World Championships at Pingtan Island and the 2025 European Beach Handball Championship in Alanya.

=== Indoor handball ===
On 25 February 2023, she signed a two-year contract with Silkeborg-Voel KFUM. She previously played her youth and first senior years in HH Elite. In her final season of 2022/23, she scored 133 goals in 29 matches.

In her first season in Silkeborg-Voel KFUM, Holm was the leading topscorer for the team by the end of the 2023/24 season with 101 goals. In February 2025, she extended her contract further one season.
