= Olivia Simonsen =

Danish handball player (born 2000)

Personal information
- Full name: Olivia Mathilde Simonsen
- Nationality: Danish
- Born: 14 August 2000 (age 26) Ringkøbing, Denmark
- Height: 1.85 m (6 ft 1 in)

Sport
- Sport: Handball
- Position: Left back
- Current club: SønderjyskE
- Number: 22

Senior clubs
- Years: Team
- 2018-2022: Herning-Ikast Håndbold
- 2022–: SønderjyskE
National team
| Years | Team | Apps | (Gls) |
| 2024– | Denmark | 3 | (0) |
- Updated on 28 October 2024

Olivia Mathilde Simonsen (born 14 August 2000) is a Danish female handball player for SønderjyskE and the Danish national team.

== Career ==
She made her debut on the Danish national team on 24 October 2024, against Netherlands. She was also part of the extended Danish squad for the 2024 European Women's Handball Championship, but was not included in the final selection.
