= Stine Bonde =

Danish handball player (born 1988)

Stine Bonde Aagaard
Personal information
- Nationality: Danish
- Born: 2 June 1988 (age 38) Hillerød, Denmark
- Height: 1.73 m (5 ft 8 in)

Sport
- Sport: Handball
- Position: Goalkeeper
- Current club: Silkeborg-Voel KFUM
- Number: 22

Youth career
- Years: Team
- –: Hornbæk SF
- 2003-2006: Randers HK

Senior clubs
- Years: Team
- 2006-2014: Randers HK
- 2014-: Silkeborg-Voel KFUM
Medal record
European Youth Championship
| Gold medal – first place | 2005 Austria |

Stine Aagaard Bonde (born 2 June 1988) is a Danish handball player who currently plays for Silkeborg-Voel KFUM. She arrived at the club in 2014 from Randers HK.
