= Natasja Andreasen =

Danish handball player (born 2000)

Personal information
- Full name: Natasja Andreasen
- Nationality: Danish
- Born: 31 October 2000 (age 25) Silkeborg, Denmark
- Height: 1.71 m (5 ft 7 in)

Sport
- Sport: Handball
- Position: Centre back
- Current club: Silkeborg-Voel KFUM
- Number: 20

Youth career
- Years: Team
- 2016-2017: Ikast Håndbold

Senior clubs
- Years: Team
- 2017-: Silkeborg-Voel KFUM
Medal record
European Youth Olympic Festival
Bronze medal – third place	2017 Győr

Natasja Andreasen (born 31 October 2000) is a Danish handball player for Silkeborg-Voel KFUM and the Danish national junior team.

She also represented Denmark in the 2019 Women's Junior European Handball Championship, placing 6th.

Her breakthrough in the Danish league came in the 2023, where she became one of the best players on the Silkeborg-Voel KFUM team.

She is the niece of fellow handball player, coach and sporting director Jakob Andreasen and cousin of handball player Jens Dolberg Plougstrup.
