= Handelsstandens Gymnastikforening =

Danish sports association

Handelsstandens Gymnastikforening (HG) was a Danish sports association based in Copenhagen. It governed many sports, but is most famous for its handball teams that won several Danish championships in both the men's league and the women's league.

The club was founded on April 28, 1880, as a Gymnastics association for traders and clerks. In 1904 Swimming also became a part of the club, and in 1927 the handball team was created.

Between 1939 and 1970 the club won the Danish men's league 13 times, including five in a row from 1966 to 1971. and between 1950 and 1977 it won the Danish Women's League 12 times. In 1965 the women's team became the first team from Western Europe to win the European Cup.

In 1980 it fused with Gladsaxe Håndboldklub to become Gladsaxe/HG. Four years after the fusion, Gladsaxe/HG won the Danish championship and reached the final of the 1983–84 IHF Cup.
