= Lea Hansen (handballer) =

Danish handball player (born 1999)

Personal information
- Nationality: Danish
- Born: 20 April 1999 (age 27) Rødekro, Denmark
- Height: 1.74 m (5 ft 9 in)

Sport
- Sport: Handball
- Position: Right wing
- Current club: Silkeborg-Voel KFUM
- Number: 6

Youth career
- Years: Team
- 2015-2016: SønderjyskE Håndbold
- 2016-2017: SK Aarhus

Senior clubs
- Years: Team
- 2017-: Silkeborg-Voel KFUM
Medal record
Women's handball
Representing Denmark
Youth World Championship
Silver medal – second place	2016 Slovakia
U-17 European Championship
Gold medal – first place	2015 U-17 Macedonia

Lea Hansen (born 20 April 1999) is a Danish handball player who currently plays for Silkeborg-Voel KFUM.

She is also a part of Denmark's national recruit team in handball. She also represented Denmark in the 2015 European Women's U-17 Handball Championship in Macedonia, leading to the trophy.

== Achievements ==
- Youth World Championship:
  - Silver Medalist: 2016
- European Youth Championship:
  - Winner: 2015
- Junior European Championship:
  - Silver Medalist: 2017
