= Nathalie Hagman =

Swedish handball player (born 1991)

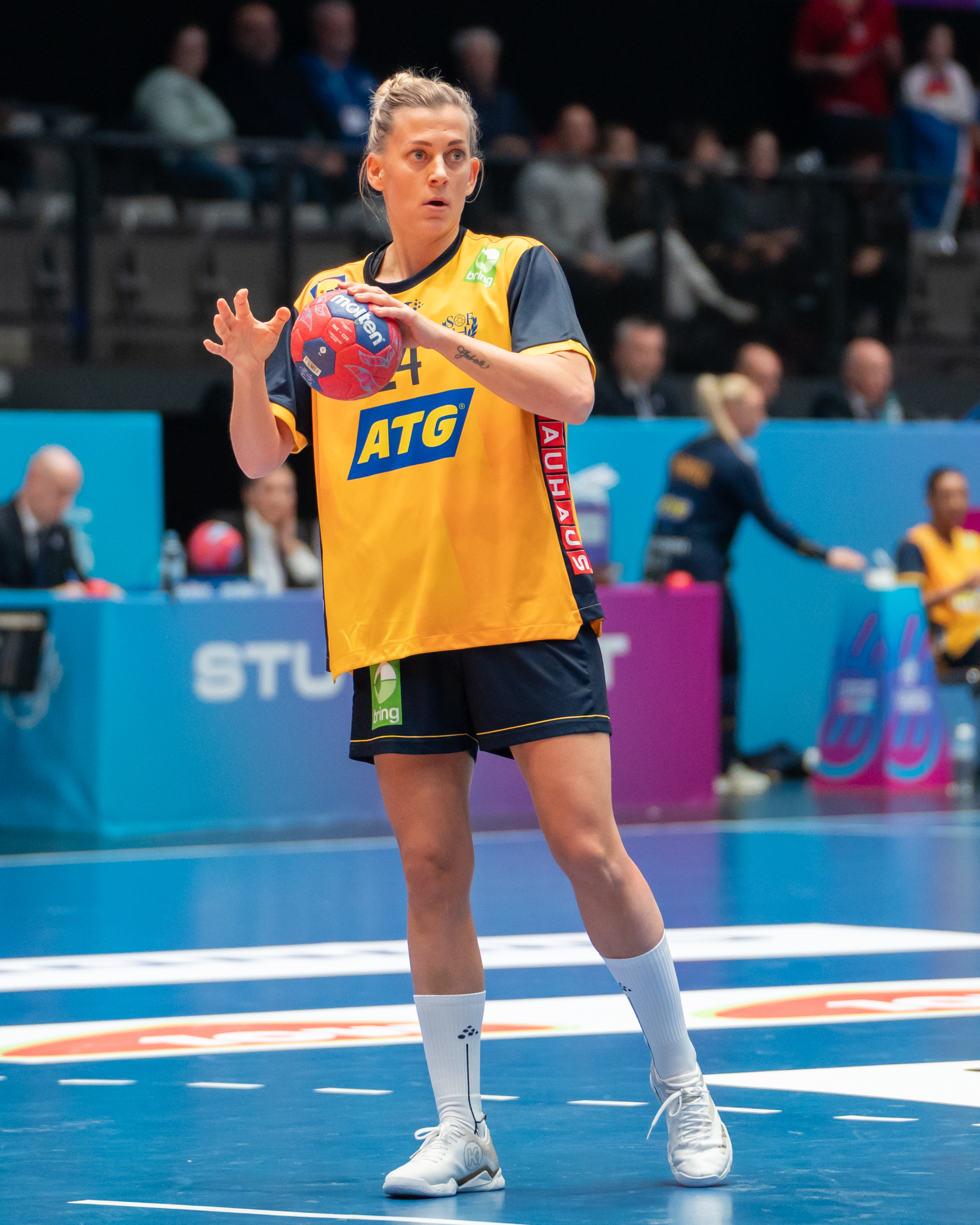
- Hagman in 2025

Personal information
- Full name: Nathalie Mari Hagman
- Nationality: Swedish
- Born: 19 July 1991 (age 35) Stockholm, Sweden
- Height: 1.67 m (5 ft 6 in)

Sport
- Sport: Handball
- Position: Right wing
- Current club: Retired

Youth career
- Years: Team
- –2007: BK Söder
- 2007–2008: Skuru IK

Senior clubs
- Years: Team
- 2008–2011: Skuru IK
- 2011–2014: Lugi HF
- 2014–2016: TTH Holstebro
- 2016–2017: Nykøbing Falster
- 2017–2019: CSM București
- 2019–2020: Odense Håndbold
- 2020–2023: Neptunes de Nantes
- 2023–2025: SCM Râmnicu Vâlcea
- 2025–2026: Győri ETO KC
National team
Years	Team	Apps	(Gls)
2009–2026	Sweden	261	(1014)
Medal record
European Championship
Silver medal – second place	2010 Denmark/Norway
Bronze medal – third place	2014 Croatia/Hungary

Nathalie Mari Hagman (born 19 July 1991) is a former Swedish handball player, who last played for Győri ETO KC and the Swedish national handball team.

She played her first match for Sweden in 2009 at the age of 17. To date, Hagman is still the youngest ever debutant in the national team.

== Honours ==
=== International ===
- EHF Champions League:
  - Bronze Medalist: 2018
  - Silver Medalist: 2026
- EHF Cup Winners' Cup:
  - Winner: 2016
- EHF European League:
  - Winner: 2015, 2021
- European Championship:
  - Silver Medalist: 2010
  - Bronze Medalist: 2014
- Carpathian Trophy:
  - Winner: 2015

=== Individual ===
- Junior World Championship Top Scorer: 2010
- Swedish Elitserien Young Player of the Season: 2009
- Swedish Elitserien Top Scorer: 2011, 2012, 2014
- EHF Cup Top Scorer: 2015
- EHF Cup Winners' Cup Top Scorer: 2016
- IHF World Women's Handball Championship Top scorer: 2021
- Danish League Player of the Season: 2016
- Danish League Best Right Wing: 2016
- Danish League Best Right Back: 2017
- Danish League top scorer: 2015-16
- Swedish Female Handballer of the Year: 2016
- All Star Right Wing of the Summer Olympics: 2016
- All Star Right Wing of the World Championship: 2017
- French League Best Right Wing: 2023
- All Star Right Wing of the World Championship: 2023

== Personal life ==
Hagman is openly lesbian. Hagman's twin sister, Gabrielle, is also a handball player.

== See also ==
- List of women's handballers with 1000 or more international goals
