= Voel =

- Town
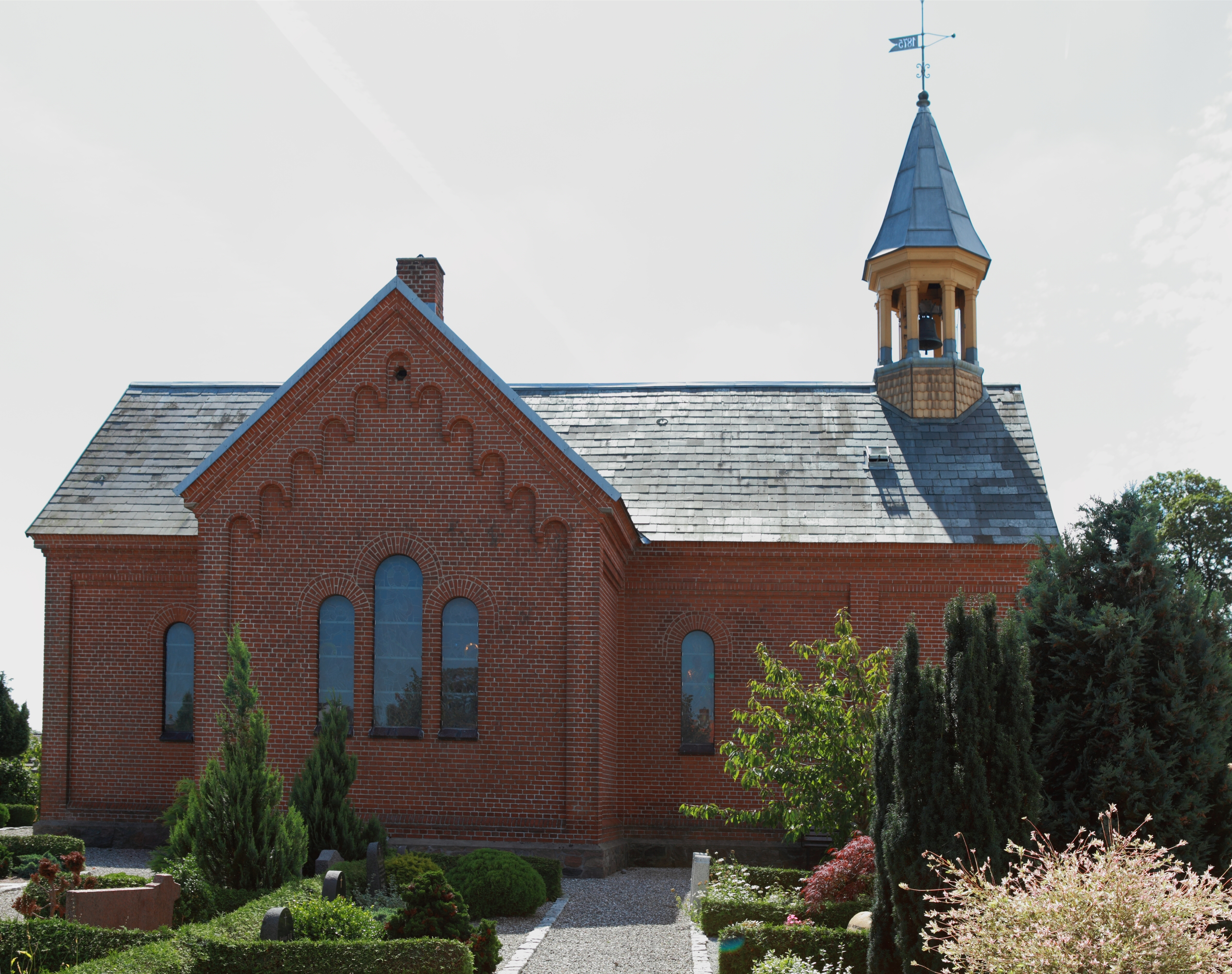
- Voel Church

- Location within Denmark Location within Central Denmark Region
- Coordinates: 56°11′28″N 9°41′29″E
- Country: Denmark
- Region: Central Denmark (Midtjylland)
- Municipality: Silkeborg Municipality

Area
  - Urban: 1.1 km^{2} (0.42 sq mi)

Population (2026)
  - Urban: 1,995
  - Urban density: 1,800/km^{2} (4,700/sq mi)
- Time zone: UTC+1 (CET)
  - Summer (DST): UTC+2 (CEST)
- Postal code: DK-8600 Silkeborg

Voel is a town, with a population of 1,995 (1 January 2026), in Silkeborg Municipality, Central Denmark Region in Denmark. It is located 10 km east of Silkeborg and 35 km west of Aarhus.

Voel Church from 1876 is located in the town.

The local handball club Silkeborg-Voel KFUM plays in the top women's division. They have previously participated in the elite level club Bjerringbro-Silkeborg-Voel, but has since withdrawn.
