= Trine Troelsen =

Danish handball player (born 1985)

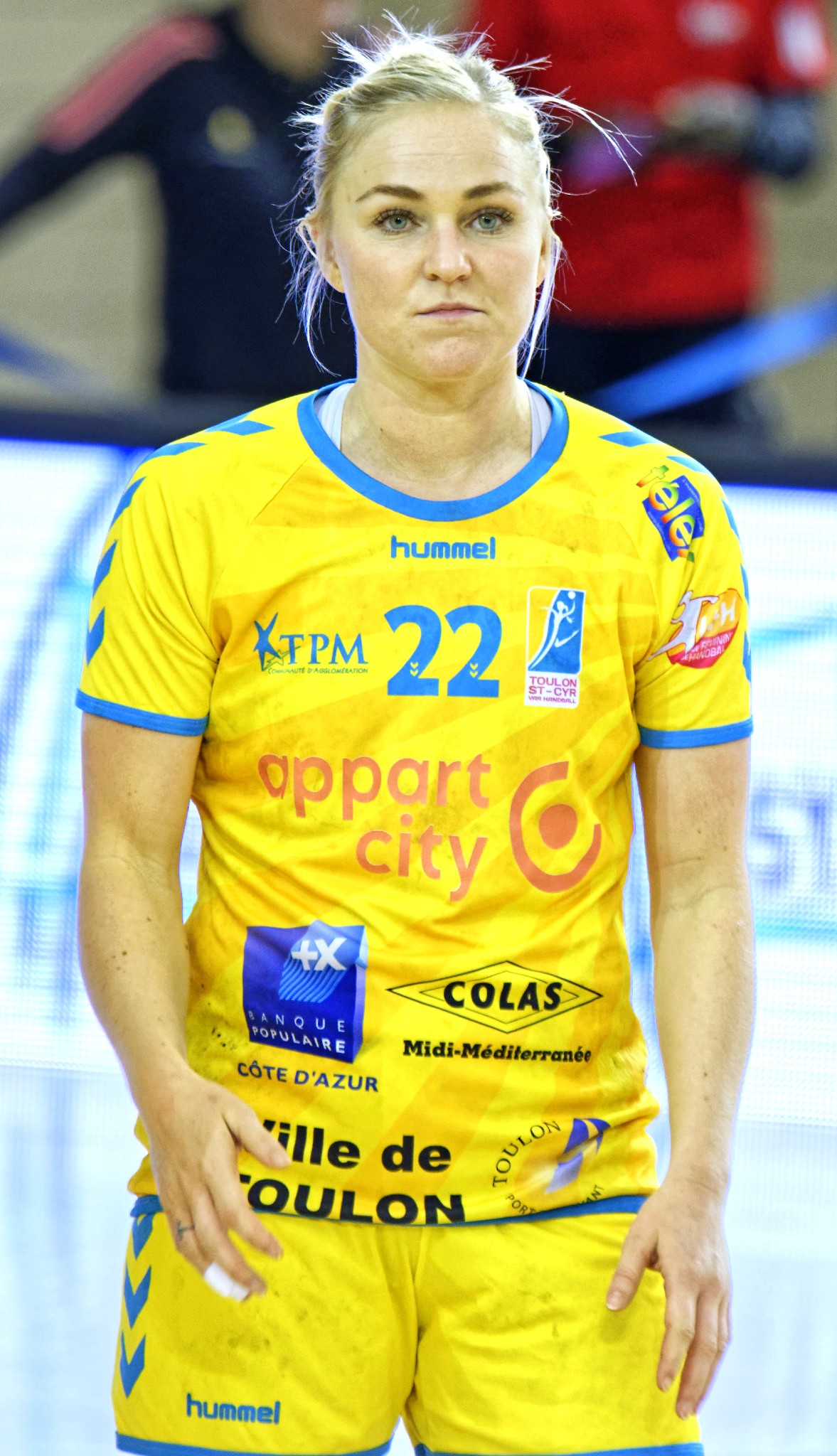

Personal information
- Nationality: Danish
- Born: 2 May 1985 (age 41) Skjern Municipality, Denmark
- Height: 1.72 m (5 ft 8 in)

Sport
- Sport: Handball
- Position: Left back

Youth career
- Years: Team
- –2003: Skjern Håndbold

Senior clubs
- Years: Team
- 2003–2007: Viborg HK
- 2007–2010: SK Aarhus
- 2010–2014: FC Midtjylland Håndbold
- 2014–2015: Toulon Handball
- 2015–2017: Silkeborg-Voel KFUM
- 2017–2019: FC Midtjylland Håndbold
National team
Years	Team	Apps	(Gls)
2006–2014	Denmark	132	(340)

Trine Bach Troelsen (born 2 May 1985) is a Danish retired team handball player who played for the Danish women's national handball team.

At the 2010 European Women's Handball Championship she reached the bronze final and placed fourth with the Danish team.

== Career ==
Troelsen started playing handball at Skjern Håndbold, but still as junior player she switched to Danish top club Viborg HK. Here she debuted in the top league Damehåndboldligaen in 2003. She did however not see much playing time at Viborg.

In 2007 league rivals SK Aarhus signed her, where she broke through to be a first team regular. But as the club had economic trouble she switched to FC Midtjylland Håndbold in the middle of the 2009/2010 season, despite the fact that she had to play as an amateur in the beginning of her tenure.

In 2014 Troelsen started receiving less playing time, so she switched to French club Toulon Saint-Cyr Var Handball, where she played for one season before returning to Denmark. Here she joined Silkeborg-Voel KFUM. In the 2016–17 season she was the top scorer in the Danish league. In 2017 she rejoined her old club, FC Midtjylland, which in the meantime had change name to Herning-Ikast Håndbold.

She played here until the end of her career in 2019.

=== National Yeam ===
She debuted for the Danish national team, and the same year she was at her first major international tournament.

As the Danish national team was in saw a lot of key players retiring, including Katrine Fruelund, Rikke Skov and Mette Sjøberg, Troelsen quickly earned a starten spot. At the 2009 World Women's Handball Championship she was the overall top scorer with 44 goals.
