= Silkeborg-Voel KFUM =

Danish handball club

- Short name: Silkeborg-Voel KFUM
- Founded: 1957; 69 years ago as Voel KFUM; 2005; 21 years ago as Silkeborg-Voel KFUM
- Arena: Jysk Arena
- Capacity: 3,000
- President: Jakob Andreasen
- Head coach: Peter Schilling Laursen
- League: Kvindeligaen
- 2025-26: 10th
- Club colours
| Home | Away |

Silkeborg-Voel KFUM is a Danish handball club from Silkeborg and Voel. In the season 2025-2026 it plays in the Danish Women's Handball League.

Location of Silkeborg-Voel KFUM

== History ==
In 1957 Voel KFUM started around the central Jutland villages Sorring, Gjern and Voel. In 2001 the team entered a sponsorship agreement with Jyske Bank and changed their name to Silkeborg-Voel KFUM. In 2003 the men's team were promoted to the top division in Denmark, Herrehåndboldligaen. After two seasons the men's team had been relegated in the 2004-05 season. The same summer they merged with Bjerringbro FH to create Bjerringbro-Silkeborg-Voel, which later became Bjerringbro-Silkeborg Håndbold. Silkeborg-Voel later left the cooperation in 2018.

Since then Silkeborg-Voel KFUM has focused on the women's team. In 2011 the team was promoted to the Damehåndboldligaen, but were relegated again the year after. Two years after they were promoted again. In their first season back, the 2014-15 Damehåndboldligaen they surprised everyone by reaching the Championship play off by finishing fifth. The team had several later national team players on the team such as Anne Cecilie la Cour, Simone Böhme and Jette Hansen. This also qualified the team for the EHF Cup for the first time.

The aftermath of the COVID-19 pandemic meant that the club was in economic trouble on the verge of bankruptcy. The Chairman Carlo de Silva therefore resigned. The club had to make 5.2 million danish kroner to stay afloat. The club did manage to put the money together with the help of among others the local Superligaen soccer team Silkeborg IF.

In 2022, they qualified for their first Final 4 at the Danish Cup (Santander Cup) after seven failed attempts in the quarterfinals.

== Results ==
- Danish Women's Handball Cup
  - Bronze (1): 2023

== Arena ==
- Arena: Jysk Arena
- City: Silkeborg
- Capacity: 3,000
- Address: Ansvej 114, 8600 Silkeborg

== Team ==
=== Current squad ===
Squad for the 2026–27 season.

Goalkeepers

- 10 (Denmark) Ida Marie Kaysen
- 12 (Sweden) Filippa Idéhn
- 50 (Denmark) Signe Stenderup Rasmussen

Wingers
LW

- 5 (Denmark) Naja Stocholm Schäfer
- 7 (Denmark) Maja Munch Laursen
- 21 (Denmark) Maja Edling Lauritsen

RW

- 6 (Denmark) Emma Klæstrup
- 23 (Denmark) Thilde Frandsen

Line players

- 2 (Denmark) Boline Laursen
- 28 (Denmark) Mathilde Blom Jantzen
- 33 (Denmark) Alberte Simonsen

Back players
LB

- 3 (Denmark) Isabella Bundgaard Poulsen
- 9 (Denmark) Anne Dolberg Plougstrup
- 31 (Denmark) Andrea West Bendtsen

CB

- 14 (Denmark) Mai Kragballe Nielsen (Pregnant)
- 18 (Denmark) Natasja Andreasen
- 19 (Denmark) Mette Brandt Nielsen

RB

- 4 (Denmark) Maria Holm
- 8 (Denmark) Emma Laursen

=== Transfers ===
Transfers for the season 2026-27.

Joining

- (Denmark) Christian Køhler (Head coach) (from (Denmark) Team Esbjerg)
- (Sweden) Filippa Idéhn (GK) (from (Denmark) Ikast Håndbold)
- (Denmark) Ida Marie Kaysen (GK) (from (Denmark) Bjerringbro FH)
- (Denmark) Naja Schäfer (LW) (from youth team)
- (Denmark) Mette Brandt Nielsen (CB) (from (Denmark) EH Aalborg)
- (Denmark) Emma Laursen (RB) (from (Denmark) Skanderborg Håndbold)
- (Denmark) Emma Klæstrup (RW) (from youth team)
- (Denmark) Mathilde Blom Jantzen (P) (from youth team)

Leaving

- (Denmark) Peter Schilling Laursen (Head coach) (to (Denmark) Aarhus Håndbold)
- (Denmark) Stine Bonde (GK) (to ?)
- (Denmark) Anna Veng Kristensen (GK) (to (Norway) Gjerpen IF)
- (Denmark) Sara Madsen (RB) (to (Denmark) Ringkøbing Håndbold)
- (Denmark) Laura Galle Hansen (RW) (to (Denmark) Fredericia HK)
- (United Kingdom) Heidi Warren (P) (to (Germany) SV Werder Bremen)

=== Technical staff ===
- (Denmark) Head Coach: Peter Schilling Laursen
- (Denmark) Assistant coach: Klaus Thomsen
- (Denmark) Team Leader: Lotte Toft
- (Denmark) Team Leader: Else Buchreitz
- (Denmark) Masseur: Rasmus Niebuhr
- (Denmark) Physiotherapist: Nicoline Wascher
- (Denmark) Physiotherapist: Asger Skovgaard
- (Denmark) Physiotherapist: Thea Molsgaard

=== Notable players ===
- (Denmark) Trine Troelsen (2015–2017)
- (Denmark) Anne Cecilie de la Cour (2013–2015)
- (Denmark) Jette Hansen (2009–2012, 2014–2015, 2016–2018)
- (Denmark) Anna Sophie Okkels (2017–2018)
- (Denmark) Louise Lyksborg (2016–2019)
- (Denmark) Stephanie Andersen (2012–2014, 2016–2019)
- (Denmark) Mathilde Bjerregaard (2015–2017)
- (Denmark) Andrea West Bendtsen (2016–2019)
- (Denmark) Emilie Ytting (2017–2022)
- (Denmark) Freja Cohrt (2015–2017)
- (Denmark) Rikke Iversen (2014–2020)
- (Denmark) Lea Hansen (2017–2022)
- (Denmark) Camilla Maibom (2014–2016)
- (Denmark) Sofie Bæk Andersen (2015-2023)
- (Denmark) Susan Thorsgaard (2006–2008)
- (Denmark) Daniella Dragojevic (2013–2014, 2015–2017)
- (Denmark) Ann Grete Nørgaard (2020-2021)
- (Denmark) Stine Bonde (2014–2026)
- (Denmark) Simone Böhme (2012–2015)
- (Norway) Stine Skogrand (2016–2018)
- (Norway) Hege Bakken Wahlquist (2017–2021)
- (Norway) Eira Aune (2020–2023)
- (Norway) Eli Marie Raasok (2020–2021)
- (Sweden) Michaela Ek (2014–2015)
- (Sweden) Filippa Idéhn (2018–2019)
- (Sweden) Mathilda Lundström (2022–2024)
- (Turkey) Sara Kececi (2014–2016)
- (Germany) Susann Müller (2018–2019)
- (Iceland) Andrea Jacobsen (2023-2024)

== Kit manufacturers ==
- (Germany) Adidas

== European record ==
| Season | Competition | Round | Club | 1st leg | 2nd leg | Aggregate |
|---|---|---|---|---|---|---|
| 2017–18 | EHF Cup | R1 | (Cyprus) Latsia Nicosia | 44–12 | 36–8 | 80–20 |
| 2017–18 | EHF Cup | R2 | (France) Besançon | 27–26 | 23–28 | 50-54 |

== See also ==
- Bjerringbro-Silkeborg
