= 1964–65 Women's European Cup (handball) =

1964–65 Women's Handball European Cup
Tournament details
- Dates: November 1964 – 16 April 1965
- Teams: 4 (Qualifying stage); 8 (knockout stage)

Final positions
- Champions: (Denmark) HG Copenhague
- Runners-up: (Hungary) Budapesti Spartacus

Tournament statistics
- Matches played: 18

The 1964–65 Women's Handball European Champions Cup was the fifth edition of the international competition for European women's handball national champion clubs, taking place from late 1964 to 16 April 1965. The number of contestants decreased from thirteen to ten due to the absences of Austria, Poland and Romania, so the qualifying stage was reduced from five ties to just two. Unlike the two previous editions, the final was carried out as a two-legged tie.

HG Copenhague became the first team from the Western Bloc to win the competition in the third appearance in a row of the Danish representative in the final, while Budapesti Spartacus was the first Hungarian team to reach it. The absence of Romania meant there was no defending champion this year.

== Qualifying stage ==
Team #1	Agg.	Team #2	L #1	L #2
Trud Moscow (Soviet Union)	24 – 17	(East Germany) Fortschritt Weissenfels	13 – 10	11 – 7
ČKD Prague (Czechoslovakia)	35 – 12	(France) Ivry	16 – 5	19 – 7

== Quarter-finals ==
Team #1	Agg.	Team #2	L #1	L #2
HG Copenhague (Denmark)	17 – 9	(Norway) Frigg Oslo	17 – 9	w/o
Swift Roermond (Netherlands)	11 – 10	(Germany) 1.FC Nürnberg	6 – 5	5 – 5
Budapesti Spartacus (Hungary)	17 – 16	(Soviet Union) Trud Moscow	10 – 7	7 – 9
Lokomotiva Zagreb (Socialist Federal Republic of Yugoslavia)	16 – 15	(Czechoslovakia) ČKD Prague	8 – 11	8 – 4

== Semifinals ==
Team #1	Agg.	Team #2	L #1	L #2
HG Copenhague (Denmark)	28 – 11	(Netherlands) Swift Roermond	12 – 3	16 – 8
Budapesti Spartacus (Hungary)	14 – 10	(Socialist Federal Republic of Yugoslavia) Lokomotiva Zagreb	7 – 6	7 – 4

== Final ==
Date	Team #1	Agg.	Team #2	L #1	L #2
16.04.1965	HG Copenhague (Denmark)	21 – 16	(Hungary) Budapesti Spartacus	14 – 6	7 – 10

Women's Handball European Cup
1964–65 Winner

(Denmark) HG Copenhague
First title
