= SønderjyskE Damehåndbold =

Danish women's handball team

SønderjyskE
- Full name: Sønderjysk Elitesport Damehåndbold
- Short name: SE, SønderjyskE
- Founded: 2004
- Arena: Arena Aabenraa
- Capacity: 1,800
- President: Klaus B. Rasmussen
- Head coach: Peter Nielsen
- League: Damehåndboldligaen
- 2023–24: 8th
| Home | Away |

SønderjyskE Damehåndbold is a women's handball club based in Aabenraa in South Jutland, Denmark. The club was founded in 2004 and has been part of the top tier league, Damehåndboldligaen two times. They promoted to the league again for the 2022/23 season.

They are part of the general sports club SønderjyskE, which also has a soccer and ice hockey team.

== History ==
SønderjyskE was created as a club for the whole region of South Jutland as it was obvious that it was impossible to create elite teams able to compete in the top leagues on the former basis of city teams. The men's football team used to be solely based in the city of Haderslev under the name Haderslev FK. In 2004 all the elite teams in football, ice hockey and handball merged into SønderjyskE, enabling the clubs to represent not only a city but the whole region of South Jutland (Sønderjylland), which drew more attention to the teams from sponsors, fans and media and made it easier to keep talents in South Jutland. In 2006 TM Tønder Håndbold withdrew from the project, when the team moved their home matches to Sønderborg, because they believed the team had come too far from their roots in Tønder.

In the 2010–11 season the team were relegated, but they were back again for the 2012-13 Damehåndboldligaen.

The team was relegated in the 2013-14 season after finishing last in the regular season. For the 2015-16 season they were back in the league, but they were relegated again after only a single season without winning even a single point.

In August 2017, the club inaugurated the women's team's new home ground in Arena Aabenraa, Aabenraa.

In the 2022-23 season the team was promoted again.

== Team ==
=== Staff ===
| Pos. | Name |
|---|---|
| Head coach | (Denmark) Peter Nielsen |
| Assistant coach | (Denmark) Mikael Jensen |
| Team Leader/Video | (Denmark) Erik Jørgensen |
| Team Leader | (Denmark) Lillian Jensen |
| Physiotherapist | (Denmark) Jannik Duus Jensen |

=== Current squad ===
Squad for the 2026-27 season

Goalkeeper

- 16 (Denmark) Julie Stokkendal Poulsen
- 26 (Sweden) Nora Persson

Wingers
LW

- 5 (Denmark) Sidsel Mygil Mattesen
- 17 (Denmark) Mathilde Guldager Østergaard

RW

- 11 (Denmark) Pernille Johannsen
- 22 (Denmark) Ditte Alnor Michelsen

Pivot

- 3 (Germany) Kara Steffensen
- 9 (Sweden) Filippa Nyman
- 14 (Denmark) Rikke Dahl Nielsen
- 21 (Denmark) Anne Hykkelbjerg

Back players
LB

- 10 (Denmark) Sofia Stenholt
- 25 (Denmark) Laura Jensen

CB

- 4 (Denmark) Nicoline Lauritsen

RB

- 8 (Norway) Karine Dahlum
- 19 (Hungary) Virág Fazekas

=== Transfers ===
Transfers for the 2026-27 season

Joining

- (Denmark) Kim Johansen (Head Coach) (from (Denmark) Skanderborg Håndbold)
- (Sweden) Nora Persson (GK) (from (Denmark) HH Elite)
- (Denmark) Mathilde Guldager Østergaard (LW) (from (Denmark) Bjerringbro FH)
- (Denmark) Laura Jensen (LB) (from (Denmark) Bjerringbro FH)
- (Denmark) Nicoline Lauritsen (CB) (from (Denmark) Skanderborg Håndbold)
- (Denmark) Ditte Alnor Michelsen (RW) (from (Denmark) Gudme HK)
- (Denmark) Anne Hykkelbjerg (P) (from (Denmark) Viborg HK)
- (Denmark) Rikke Dahl Nielsen (P) (from (Denmark) Bjerringbro FH)

Leaving

- (Denmark) Peter Nielsen (Head Coach) (to (Denmark) SønderjyskE Herrehåndbold)
- (Denmark) Sarah Ernebjerg Jensen (GK) (to (Denmark) Bjerringbro FH)
- (Norway) June Bøttger (LW) (to (Norway) Fredrikstad BK)
- (Denmark) Olivia Simonsen (LB) (to (Norway) Molde Elite)
- (Denmark) Louise Ellebæk (LB) (Retires)
- (Denmark) Emilie Clemmensen (LB) (to (Denmark) Odense Håndbold)
- (Denmark) Line Uno (CB) (Retires)
- (Denmark) Sarah Paulsen (CB) (to (Poland) MKS Lublin)
- (Denmark) Victoria Mørk (CB) (to (Denmark) Ikast Håndbold)
- (Denmark) Lea Hansen (RW) (Retires)
- (Norway) Sherin Obaidli (P) (to (Norway) Molde Elite)
