= Rofi-Centret =

Danish sporting arena

Rofi-Centret is an indoor sports arena in Ringkøbing, Denmark primarily used for handball. It can hold 1,100 spectators and is home to Ringkøbing Håndbold. Since 2016 it has been known as Green Sports Arena for sponsorship reasons.
