= Kvindeligaen (handball) =

Handball league in Denmark

- Founded: 1936
- No. of teams: 14
- Country: Denmark
- Confederation: EHF
- Most recent champions: Team Esbjerg (6th title) (2025-26)
- Most titles: Viborg HK (14 titles)
- Broadcasters: TV 2, TV 2 Sport
- Relegation to: 1. Division
- International cups: EHF Champions League; EHF European League
- Website: www.tophaandbold.dk
- 2025-26

The Kvindeligaen (English: women's league) is the top professional league for Danish women's handball clubs. It is administered by the Danish Handball Federation, and the winners are recognized as Danish champions. The league was previously called Bambusa Kvindeligaen for sponsorship reasons. It has previously been known as HTH GO Ligaen, Primo Tours Ligaen, Boxer Dameligaen, TOMS Ligaen and GuldBageren Ligaen. The current title holder is Team Esbjerg (2026). The European Handball Federation (EHF) ranks the Danish league 4th in the coefficients of leagues based on performances in European competitions over the past seasons.

== History ==
Prior to 1964, Danish handball were organized into regional leagues, where the Danish Champion were decided in an end-of-season play-off between the four winners of the regional divisions. The championship in 1945 was cancelled due to the German occupation of Denmark. In 1961-62 the format was changed to 2 regional leagues, and in 1965-66 the first proper women's league was created. Just a year before, in 1964-65 European Cup, Handelsstandens Gymnastikforening had become the first Danish team to win the premier continental tournament. Later, both Viborg HK and Slagelse DT has won the tournament as well.

From the 1998–99 season the Kvindeligaen was created and the 1st Division was relegated to being the second tier. In 1999, Viborg HK became the first Danish club to turn their first team into a stock-based corporation.

== Competition format ==
The Kvindeligaen shares the season style with the men's league. It consists of 14 teams, each playing 26 regular season games. The eight best teams of the regular season advance to further games, where they are divided into two groups of four teams each. No. 1 and 2 from the regular season start with 2 points. No. 3 and 4 start with 1 point, while no. 5–8 start with no points. After these six games the two top teams in each group will play semifinals. No. 1 from one group is up against no. 2 from the other. The winners will meet in finals, while the losers will play against each other for the bronze medal. Semifinals, finals, and bronze games are all played in best of 3.

The lowest placed team of the regular season is directly relegated to the second-best division, and replaced by the winner of this. The teams finishing as 9, 10, 11, 12 and 13 are put in a group where they will play against each other. In the second-best division, the teams that end up 2nd and 3rd will play against each other in best of 3. The winner of those games will get to meet the lowest placed team from the 9-13 group from the top league, yet again in best of 3. The winner will get to play in the top league next season, while the loser plays in the second-best division.

== Seasons ==
=== Current teams (2026/27) ===
Location of the Kvindeligaen 2026–27 teams

The fourteen teams of the 2026/27 season are:

Team	Finishing pos. in last season 2025/26	First season of current spell in top division	Top division titles
Nordvestjysk Elite	1st in (1st division)	2026–27	0
EH Aalborg	12th	2024-25	0
HH Elite	7th	2019-20	0
Ikast Håndbold	4th	1991-92	4
København Håndbold	6th	2013-14	1
Nykøbing F. Håndbold	3rd place, bronze medalist(s)	2012-13	1
Odense Håndbold	2nd place, silver medalist(s)	2009-10	3
SønderjyskE Håndbold	8th	2022-23	0
Ringkøbing Håndbold	11th	2021-22	0
Skanderborg Håndbold	13th	2018-19	0
Silkeborg-Voel KFUM	10th	2014-15	0
Team Esbjerg	1st place, gold medalist(s)	2007-08	6
HØJ Elite	9th	2025-26	0
Viborg HK	5th	1988-89	14

=== Champions ===
The complete list of champions since 1936:

Season	Gold	Silver	Bronze
1935–1936	K.I.		
1936–1937	K.K.G.		
1937–1938	K.I.		
1938–1939	R.H. 33		
1939–1940	K.K.G.		
1940–1941	K.K.G.		
1941–1942	AGF		
1942–1943	K.I.		
1943–1944	K.I.		
1944–1945	Didn't take place		
1945–1946	K.K.G.		
1946–1947	K.I.		
1947–1948	K.I.		
1948–1949	AGF		
1949–1950	K.I.		
1950–1951	H.G.		
1951–1952	V.R.I.		
1952–1953	H.G.		
1953–1954	K.I.		
1954–1955	USG		
1955–1956	FIF		
1956–1957	H.G.		
1957–1958	H.G.		
1958–1959	FIF		
1959–1960	H.G.		
1960–1961	Svendborg HK		
1961–1962	FIF		
1962–1963	Helsingør IF		
1963–1964	H.G.		
1964–1965	H.G.		
1965–1966	FIF	H.G.	IK Skovbakken
1966–1967	FIF	H.G.	IK Skovbakken
1967–1968	H.G.	FIF	K.I.
1968–1969	H.G.	FIF	K.I.
1969–1970	H.G.	FIF	Glostrup IC
1970–1971	FIF	H.G.	Glostrup IC
1971–1972	FIF	Glostrup IC	Hørsholm-Usserød IK
1972–1973	FIF	Funder GF	Næstved IF
1973–1974	FIF	H.G.	Glostrup IC
1974–1975	H.G.	FIF	Helsingør IF
1975–1976	FIF	AIA-Tranbjerg	H.G.
1976–1977	H.G.	FIF	Svendborg HK
1977–1978	FIF	AIA-Tranbjerg	Svendborg HK
1978–1979	Svendborg HK	FIF	AIA-Tranbjerg
1979–1980	FIF	Helsingør IF	Greve IF
1980–1981	FIF	IF Stjernen	Svendborg HK
1981–1982	AIA-Tranbjerg	Svendborg HK	FIF
1982–1983	Helsingør IF	Holstebro KFUM	FIF
1983–1984	Helsingør IF	AIA-Tranbjerg	Rødovre HK
1984–1985	FIF	Helsingør IF	IF Stjernen
1985–1986	IF Stjernen	Rødovre HK	GOG
1986–1987	Rødovre HK	Lyngså BK	NNfH Lemvig
1987–1988	Lyngså BK	Rødovre HK	GOG
1988–1989	FIF	AIA-Tranbjerg	GOG
1989–1990	GOG	FIF	Lyngså BK
1990–1991	GOG	Viborg HK	FIF
1991–1992	GOG	Viborg HK	FIF
1992–1993	GOG	Viborg HK	FIF
1993–1994	Viborg HK	GOG	Ikast FS
1994–1995	Viborg HK	GOG	Ikast FS
1995–1996	Viborg HK	GOG	Ikast FS
1996–1997	Viborg HK	Frederikshavn fI	GOG
1997–1998	Ikast FS	Viborg HK	FIF
1998–1999	Viborg HK	Ikast FS	Frederikshavn fI
1999–2000	Viborg HK	FIF	Ikast-Bording EH
2000–2001	Viborg HK	GOG	Ikast-Bording EH
2001–2002	Viborg HK	Ikast-Bording EH	Randers HK
2002–2003	Slagelse FH	Ikast-Bording EH	GOG
2003–2004	Viborg HK	Slagelse FH	Ikast-Bording EH
2004–2005	Slagelse DT	Aalborg DH	Viborg HK
2005–2006	Viborg HK	Slagelse DT	Aalborg DH
2006–2007	Slagelse DT	Viborg HK	Aalborg DH
2007–2008	Viborg HK	Ikast-Bording EH	FCK Håndbold
2008–2009	Viborg HK	Aalborg DH	FCK Håndbold
2009–2010	Viborg HK	Randers HK	KIF Vejen
2010–2011	FC Midtjylland Håndbold	Randers HK	Viborg HK
2011–2012	Randers HK	Viborg HK	FC Midtjylland Håndbold
2012–2013	FC Midtjylland Håndbold	Team Tvis Holstebro	Viborg HK
2013–2014	Viborg HK	FC Midtjylland Håndbold	Randers HK
2014–2015	FC Midtjylland Håndbold	Team Esbjerg	Team Tvis Holstebro
2015–2016	Team Esbjerg	FC Midtjylland Håndbold	Team Tvis Holstebro
2016–2017	Nykøbing Falster Håndboldklub	København Håndbold	FC Midtjylland Håndbold
2017–2018	København Håndbold	Odense Håndbold	Viborg HK
2018–2019	Team Esbjerg	Herning-Ikast Håndbold	Odense Håndbold
2019–2020	Team Esbjerg	Odense Håndbold	Viborg HK
2020–2021	Odense Håndbold	Viborg HK	Herning-Ikast Håndbold
2021–2022	Odense Håndbold	Team Esbjerg	Herning-Ikast Håndbold
2022–2023	Team Esbjerg	Odense Håndbold	Herning-Ikast Håndbold
2023–2024	Team Esbjerg	Nykøbing Falster Håndboldklub	Odense Håndbold
2024–2025	Odense Håndbold	Team Esbjerg	Ikast Håndbold
2025–2026	Team Esbjerg	Odense Håndbold	NFH

== Medal table ==
The all-time medal table for the women's championship is as follows:

Team	Gold	Silver	Bronze
Viborg HK	14	6	4
FIF København	12	8	6
Team Esbjerg	6	3	7
HG København	5	4	1
Herning-Ikast Håndbold	4	7	13
GOG	4	4	0
Odense Håndbold	4	3	2
Slagelse DT	3	2	0
Helsingør IF	2	2	1
IF AIA-Tranbjerg	1	4	1
Randers HK	1	2	2
Rødovre HK	1	2	1
Svendborg HK	1	1	3
Nykøbing Falster Håndboldklub	1	1	1
IF Stjernen	1	1	1
Lyngså BK	1	1	1
København Håndbold	1	1	0
Aalborg DH	0	2	2
Glostrup IC	0	1	3
Holstebro	0	1	2
IK Skovbakken	0	1	2
Frederikshavn f.I.	0	1	1
Funder GF	0	1	0
Holstebro KFUM	0	1	0
K.I. København	0	0	2
FCK Håndbold	0	0	2
Hørsholm-Usserød IK	0	0	1
Næstved IF	0	0	1
Greve IF	0	0	1
NNfH Lemvig	0	0	1
KIF Vejen	0	0	1

== Top scorers ==
The following list shows the top scorers since 1965/66:

- 1965/66: Birthe Hansen, FIF (80)
- 1966/67: Jytte Skøtt Mikkelsen, Hjallese GF (63)
- 1967/68: Ingeborg Jensen, Randers Freja (93)
- 1968/69: Aase Jensen, Glostrup IC (86)
- 1969/70: Birthe Hansen, FIF (85)
- 1970/71: Karen Rasmussen, H.G. (94)
- 1971/72: Tove Nielsen, V.R.I (88)
- 1972/73: Karen Rasmussen, H.G. (98)
- 1973/74: Jette Madsen, Næstved IF (97)
- 1974/75: Anne Grete Enggård, Funder GF (78)
- 1975/76: Bente Lauridsen, AIA-Tranbjerg (84)
- 1976/77: Ann Andreasen, Svendborg HK (87)
- 1977/78: Bente Lauridsen, AIA-Tranbjerg (101)
- 1978/79: Bente Lauridsen, AIA-Tranbjerg (87)
- 1979/80: Karen Rask, Ejstrupholm GF (91)
- 1980/81: Birte Carlsen, Helsingør IF (104)
- 1981/82: Karen Frandsen, Lynge-Uggeløse IF (107)
- 1982/83: Tove Okkerstrøm, Holstebro KFUM (103)
- 1983/84: Conni Olesen, NNNfH (105)
- 1984/85: Hanne Green, NNNfH (108)
- 1985/86: Anette Rytter, IF Stjernen (115)
- 1986/87: Anette Rytter, IF Stjernen (129)
- 1987/88: Vibeke Nielsen, AIA Tranbjerg (105)
- 1988/89: Helle Petersen, Helsingør IF (92)
- 1989/90: Helle Petersen, Helsingør IF (93)
- 1990/91: Gitte Madsen, Horsens HK (119)
- 1991/92: Betina Nørager, Svendborg HK (136)
- 1992/93: Lise Lotte Lauridsen, Lyngså BK (139)
- 1993/94: Sisse Bruun Jørgensen Virum-Sorgenfri HK (141)
- 1994/95: Heidi Astrup, Viborg HK (157)
- 1995/96: Mette Vestergaard, FIF (172)
- 1996/97: Merete Møller, Vorup FB (163)
- 1997/98: Camilla Andersen, FIF (188)
- 1998/99: Camilla Andersen, FIF (180)
- 1999/2000: Camilla Andersen, FIF (163)
- 2000/01: Mette Vestergaard, FIF (133)
- 2001/02: Camilla Andersen, Slagelse FH (181)
- 2002/03: Camilla Andersen, Slagelse FH (215)
- 2003/04: Bojana Petrović, Slagelse FH (175)
- 2004/05: Bojana Popović, Slagelse FH (174)
- 2005/06: Tanja Milanović, Ikast-Bording EH (172)
- 2006/07: Mette Sjøberg, FCK Håndbold (167)
- 2007/08: Nadine Krause, FCK Håndbold (153)
- 2008/09: Grit Jurack, Viborg HK (125)
- 2011/12: Mette Gravholt, Team Tvis Holstebro (141)
- 2012/13: Estavana Polman, SønderjyskE Damer (138)
- 2013/14: Estavana Polman, Team Esbjerg (152)
- 2014/15: Jette Hansen, Silkeborg-Voel KFUM (157)
- 2015/16: Nathalie Hagman, Team Tvis Holstebro (191)
- 2016/17: Trine Troelsen, Silkeborg-Voel KFUM (199)
- 2017/18: Ida Bjørndalen Karlsson, Team Esbjerg (168)
- 2018/19: Laura Damgaard Lund, EH Aalborg (158)
- 2019/20: Mia Rej, København Håndbold (170)
- 2020/21: Kristina Jørgensen, Viborg HK (180)
- 2021/22: Mathilde Neesgaard, Aarhus United (179)
- 2022/23: Henny Reistad, Team Esbjerg (204)
- 2023/24: Line Gyldenløve, Bjerringbro FH (173)
- 2024/25: Tabea Schmid, København Håndbold (287)
- 2025/26: Julie Scaglione, Ikast Håndbold (225)

== Statistics ==
=== EHF coefficients ===
The following data indicates Danish coefficient rankings between European handball leagues.

Country ranking

EHF League Ranking for 2022/23 season:

1. (1) (Hungary) Nemzeti Bajnokság I (157.67)
2. (5) (France) Ligue Butagaz Énergie (118.50)
3. (2) (Russia) Russian Superleague (114.50)
4. (3) (Denmark) Bambusa Kvindeligaen (109.00)
5. (6) (Norway) REMA 1000-ligaen (102.17)
6. (4) (Romania) Liga Națională (94.50)

== Broadcasting rights ==
- TV2 Danmark
- TV2 Sport

=== In European competitions ===
	Champions League				EHF Cup				Challenge Cup				Cup Winners' Cup			
	C	winning year(s)	RU	SF	C	winning year(s)	RU	SF	C	winning year(s)	RU	SF	C	winning year(s)	RU	SF
Viborg HK	3	2006, 2009, 2010	2	1	3	1994, 1999, 2004	0	0	0		0	0	1	2014	1	0
Slagelse FH	3	2004, 2005, 2007	0	0	1	2003	0	0	0		0	0	0		0	0
HG København	1	1965	1	2	0		0	0	0		0	0	0		0	0
FC Midtjylland (Ikast)	0		0	2	2	2002, 2011	1	2	1	1998	1	1	2	2004, 2015	0	1
Team Tvis Holstebro	0		0	0	2	2013, 2015	1	0	0		0	0	1	2016	0	0
Randers HK	0		0	0	1	2010	0	1	0		1	0	0		0	0
FC København	0		0	0	0		0	0	0		0	0	1	2009	0	1
Frederiksberg IF	0		1	0	0		0	0	0		0	0	0		0	1
Helsingør IF	0		1	0	0		0	0	0		0	0	0		0	0
KIF Vejen	0		0	0	0		0	1	0		0	0	0		1	0
Aalborg DH	0		0	1	0		0	0	0		0	0	0		0	0
Team Esbjerg	0		0	0	0		1	0	0		0	0	0		0	0
GK Svendborg	0		0	0	0		0	0	0		0	0	0		0	1
AIA-Tranbjerg	0		0	0	0		0	0	0		0	0	0		0	1
Rødovre HK	0		0	0	0		0	0	0		0	0	0		0	1
Kolding IF	0		0	0	0		0	0	0		0	0	0		0	1
TOTAL	7 title		5	6	9 title		3	4	1 title		2	1	5 title		2	7

== See also ==
- Women's sports
- Herreligaen
- Danish Women's Handball Cup
- Danish Super Cup (handball)
