= Vejen EH =

Danish handball club

- Full name: Vejen Elite Håndbold
- Founded: 2011
- Dissolved: 2014
- Arena: Vejen Idrætcenter, Vejen, Denmark
- League: Danish Women's Handball League
- Club colours
Home	Away

Vejen EH is a former team handball club for women from Vejen, Denmark that played in the Damehåndboldligaen, the top league in Denmark. The club declared bankruptcy on 28 April, 2014.

== History ==
Vejen EH began as KIF Vejen in 2005, which in KIF Kolding thought that women's team too much stood in the shadow of the successful men's team, which has been one of the most successful teams in Denmark. By physically move the team to the way it was hoped to attract enough spectators and sponsors to maintain women's team's position in the league.

The best international result came in the 2009-2010 when the team played in the EHF Cup Winners' Cup final, where they lost to ŽRK Budućnost Podgorica 20:23 and 16:18 over two matches.

In 2011 it was decided to completely break with Kolding IF. From the beginning of the season 2013/14 the club changed as to EH Vejen. However, it was difficult to provide sufficient income, and 27 February 2014 the club was close to closing. They managed to raise capital so the season could be played to completion, but two months later declared the board club for bankruptcy. Nykøbing Falster Håndboldklub, who had just been relegated, were offered their place in the league.
