= BioCirc Arena =

Sports venue in Viborg, Denmark

Coordinates: 56°27′16.28″N 9°24′9.09″E

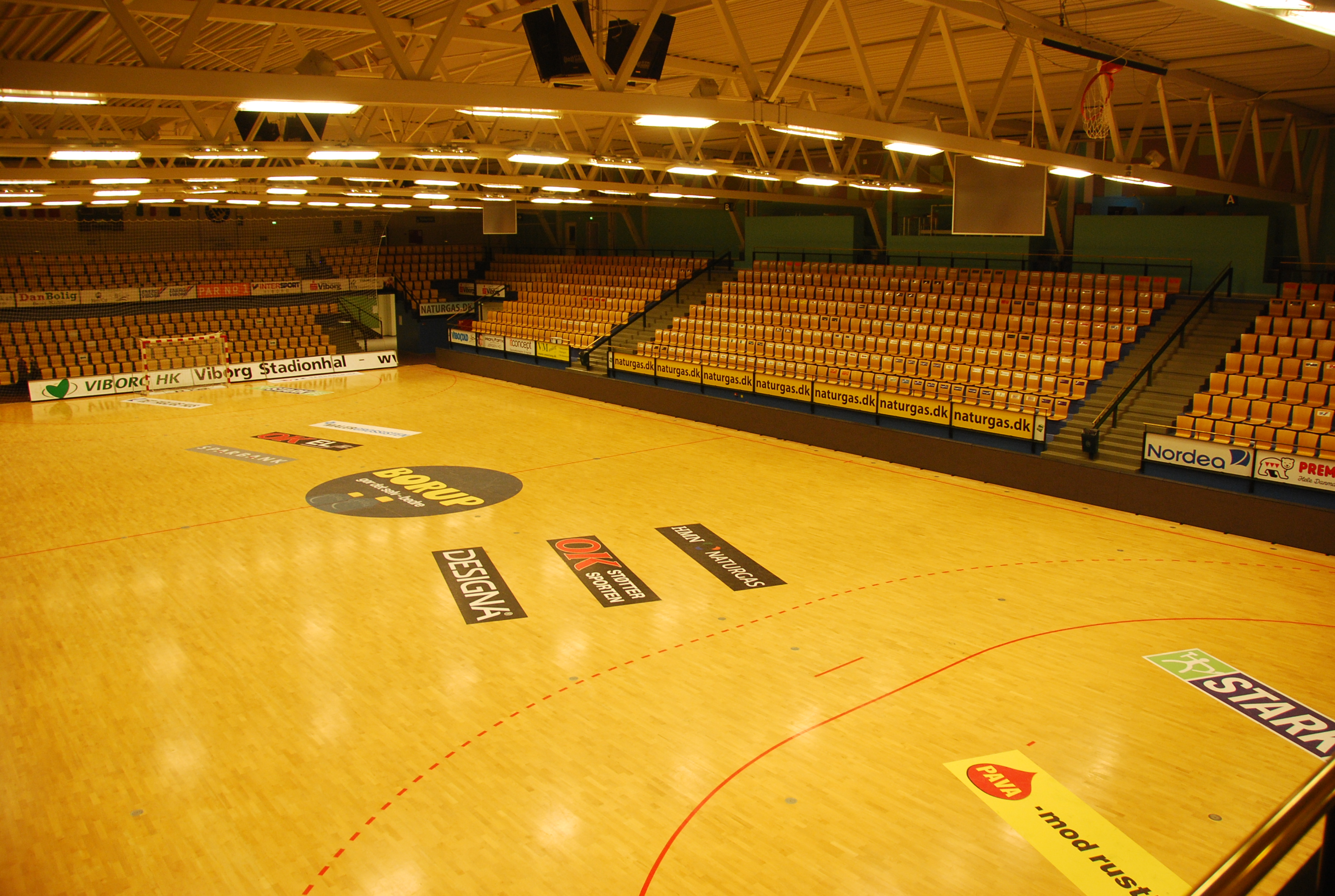
Viborg Stadionhal. (photo: Lars Schmidt)

BioCirc Arena (previously Vibocold Arena Viborg and Viborg Stadionhal) is an indoor sports arena in Viborg, Denmark primarily used for handball. The arena can hold a maximum of 2,865 spectators with 1,883 seats, and is home to Handball team Viborg HK, hosting both their men's and women's teams in the arena.

The biggest attendance was in 2007, when Viborg HK played against Slagelse DT in the second match for the Danish Championship. 9.987 Spectators attended the final.

The second biggest attendance was in December 2003, when the men's team from Viborg HK played against Mors-Thy Håndbold. 2800 spectators attended the match, which was a match, fighting for 1st. place in the second best men's handball league. (The winner would advance to the best league) It is currently the second biggest attendance for a 1. division handball match in Denmark. The record is held by HC Midtjylland who had an attendance of 3,742 spectators during a match against Lemvig-Thyborøn Håndbold.
