= TTH Holstebro =

Danish handball club

- Full name: TTH Holstebro
- Short name: TTH
- Founded: May 1, 2000; 26 years ago
- Arena: Gråkjær Arena
- Capacity: 3,250
- President: John Mikkelsen
- Head coach: Arnór Atlason
- League: Håndboldligaen
- 2025–26: 7th
- Club colours
Home	Away

TTH Holstebro is a men's handball club from Holstebro, Denmark. The team is playing in the Danish Primo Tours Ligaen and play their home matches in Gråkjær Arena. Previously, the club also had an affiliated women's team until 2020.

Location of TTH Holstebro

== History ==
=== Founding ===
The club was founded on 1 May 2000, when Holstebro Håndbold 90 and Tvis KFUM merged their first teams to create the new club.

In 2002 disagreements between HH90 and Tvis KFUM nearly let to the dissolvement of the club. A general assembly was called to dissolve the club, but an agreement between the two founding clubs was found last minute, which separated the elite team as its own legal entity.

=== First successes ===
In 2008 the club won their first ever trophy, when they won the Danish Men's Handball Cup. Later the same season they got their best ever league finish, when they won Bronze medals for the first time.

In 2013 the women's team won the EHF Cup and the men's team won bronze medals. In 2014-15 the women's team won the title for a second time.

In 2016 the club changed the name from 'Team Tvis Holstebro' to 'TTH Holstebro'. The reason for the change was that the sponsors was primarily based in Holstebro and wanted that town to have more focus compared to the relatively smaller Tvis.

In 2018 they won the Danish Cup for a second time as well as the Danish Super Cup.

=== 2020 to present day ===
The club decided to split up the men's and women's in 2020 section in each clubs, due to the COVID-19 pandemic. HH90 took over the women's section, called Holstebro Håndbold.

== Men's handball team ==
=== Kits ===
HOME
2019–20	2020–21

AWAY
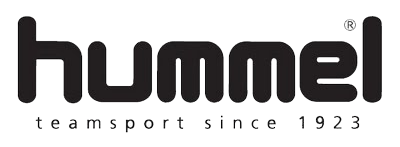
2015–16

=== Results ===
- Danish Handball League:
  - Silver: 2016
  - Bronze: 2009, 2012, 2014, 2020
- Danish Handball Cup: 2
  - Gold: 2008, 2017
- EHF Cup:
  - Bronze: 2013
- Danish Super Cup
  - Gold: 2018

=== Team ===
==== Current squad ====
Squad for the 2026–27 season

TTH Holstebro

Goalkeepers

- 1 (Sweden) Emil Holmberg Schatzl
- 30 (Denmark) Aron Fischer Hockerup
- 41 (Portugal) Gustavo Capdeville

Left Wingers

- 2 (Denmark) Joachim Lyng Als
- 10 (Denmark) Magnus Bramming

Right Wingers

- 17 (Denmark) Lucas Amby Jensen
- 19 (Denmark) Magnus Storgaard Pedersen

Pivots

- 4 (Denmark) Niels Povlsgaard Clausen
- 5 (Denmark) Frederik Arnoldsen
- 9 (Denmark) Jonas Raundahl
- 79 (Faroe Islands) Teis Horn Rasmussen

Left Backs

- 7 (Norway) William Aar
- 14 (Denmark) Emil Reinholdt Hansen

Centre Backs

- 11 (Denmark) Thomas Damgaard
- 18 (Denmark) Rasmus Sandholm Mortensen
- 34 (Netherlands) Thomas Houtepen
- 42 (Norway) Eskil Dahl Reitan
- 45 (Iceland) Benedikt Gunnar Óskarsson

Right Backs

- 8 (Denmark) Emil Grønbech Hansen
- 33 (Iceland) Jóhannes Berg Andrason

Defenders

- 21 (Denmark) Mathias Smed (c)

==== Technical staff ====
- (Iceland) Head Coach: Arnór Atlason
- (Denmark) Assistant Coach: Jacob Hessellund
- (Denmark) Goalkeeping Coach: Søren Rasmussen
- (Denmark) Physiotherapist: Morten Graversen
- (Denmark) Physiotherapist: Thomas Graagaard
- (Denmark) Physiotherapist: Rasmus Jørgensen
- (Denmark) Team Leader: Steen Kallesøe
- (Denmark) Team Leader: Laust Buch

=== Transfers ===
Transfers for the 2026–27 season

Joining

- (Portugal) Gustavo Capdeville (GK) from (Portugal) S.L. Benfica
- (Iceland) Benedikt Gunnar Óskarsson (CB) from (Norway) Kolstad Håndball
- (Sweden) Emil Holmberg Schatzl (GK) from (Sweden) Alingsås HK
- (Denmark) Aron Fischer Hockerup (GK) (from (Denmark) Fredericia HK U19)
- (Denmark) Lucas Amby (RW) (from (Denmark) Bjerringbro-Silkeborg Håndbold U19)
- (Denmark) Niels Povlsgaard Clausen (P) (from (Denmark) Mors-Thy Håndbold U19)
- (Faroe Islands) Teis Horn Rasmussen (P) (from (Denmark) Ribe-Esbjerg HH)

Leaving

- (Germany) Sven Ehrig (RW) to (Switzerland) GC Amicitia Zürich
- (Norway) Krister Skarsvaag Midtflå (LB) to (Norway) Bergsøy IL
- (Denmark) Nikolaj Markussen (LB) (retires)
- (Denmark) Sebastian Ørum (LP) to (Denmark) Norddjurs Håndbold
- (Denmark) Rasmus Henriksen (GK) to (Denmark) Mors-Thy Håndbold
- (Denmark) Frederik Møller Wolff (GK) loan back to (Denmark) GOG Håndbold

=== Transfer History ===
Transfers for the 2025–26 season

Joining

- (Netherlands) Thomas Houtepen (CB) from (Germany) TBV Lemgo
- (Norway) Eskil Dahl Reitan (CB) from (Norway) Bergen Håndball
- (Iceland) Jóhannes Berg Andrason (RB) from (Iceland) FH Hafnarfjarðar
- (Denmark) Joachim Lyng Als (LW) from (Denmark) GOG Håndbold
- (Denmark) Jonas Raundahl (LP) from (Denmark) Nordsjælland Håndbold
- (Denmark) Frederik Arnoldsen (LP) from (Denmark) Skanderborg AGF Håndbold
- (Denmark) Emil Grønbech Hansen (RB) from (Denmark) Skive fH
- (Denmark) Frederik Møller Wolff (GK) on loan from (Denmark) GOG Håndbold
- (Denmark) Magnus Storgaard Pedersen (RW) (from (Denmark) Mors-Thy Håndbold)

Leaving

- (Norway) Kevin Gulliksen (RW) to (Norway) Elverum Håndball
- (Norway) Sander Heieren (GK) to (Denmark) Fredericia HK
- (Sweden) Edwin Aspenbäck (RB) to (Germany) Rhein-Neckar Löwen
- (Denmark) Frederik Bjerre (LW) to (Denmark) GOG Håndbold
- (Denmark) Jonas Porup (LB) to (Denmark) Lemvig-Thyborøn Håndbold
- (Denmark) Johan Meklenborg (CB) to (Denmark) Aarhus HC
- (Denmark) Frank Mikkelsen (end of loan (Denmark) HC Odense Herrer)
- (Denmark) Christoffer Cichosz (LP) (Retires)
- (Slovenia) Miha Žvižej (LP) (Retires)

=== European record ===
==== EHF Cup ====
Season	Round	Club	Home	Away	Aggregate	Comment
2013–14	Round 2	(Switzerland) HC Kriens-Luzern	35–23	36–36	71–59	-
2013–14	Round 3	(Romania) Stiinta Municipal Dedeman Bacau	32–27	28–29	61–55	-
2013–14	Group	(Russia) St. Petersburg HC	28–24	30–32	60–54	-
2013–14	Group	(Spain) BM Granollers	29–24	28–28	57–52	-
2013–14	Group	(Romania) HCM Constanta	34–28	34–34	68–62	-
2013–14	1/4 Finals	(Slovenia) RK Gorenje Velenje	30–31	28–27	57–59	-
2012–13	Round 2	(Poland) Tauron Stal Mielec	30–24	29–26	56–53	-
2012–13	Round 3	(France) Saint-Raphaël Var Handball	35–19	35–32	67–54	-
2012–13	Group	(Poland) Orlen Wisła Płock	27–26	28–29	56–54	-
2012–13	Group	(Slovenia) RK Maribor Branik	26–26	31–27	57–53	-
2012–13	Group	(Norway) Elverum Håndball	33–18	28–28	61–46	-
2012–13	Quarter Finals	(Denmark) KIF Kolding København	27–26	24–24	51–50	-
2012–13	Final Tournament	(Germany) Frisch Auf Göppingen	-	-	28–27	-
2012–13	Final Tournament	(France) HBC Nantes	-	-	20–26	-

==== EHF Cup Winners' Cup ====
Season	Round	Club	Home	Away	Aggregate	Comment
2009–10	Round 3	(Belarus) HC Meshkov Brest	31–23	33–29	60–56	-
2009–10	Round 4	(Turkey) Izmir BSB SK	31–24	27–33	64–51	-
2009–10	1/4 Final	(Germany) VfL Gummersbach	27–32	30–27	54–62	-

==== EHF Challenge Cup ====
Season	Round	Club	Home	Away	Aggregate	Comment
2002–03	Round 2	(Romania) Steaua Bukarest	32–18	21–26	58–39	-
2002–03	Round 3	(Ukraine) Politechnyk-Olkom Doneck	30–21	20–30	60–41	-
2002–03	Round 4	(France) US Creteil Handball	20–20	29–20	40–49	-

== Women's handball team ==
=== Results ===
- Danish Women's Handball League:
  - Silver: 2013
  - Bronze: 2015, 2016
- Women's EHF Cup: 2
  - Gold: 2013, 2015
  - Silver: 2011
- Women's EHF Cup Winners' Cup: 1
  - Gold: 2016

=== European record ===
Season	Competition	Round	Club	1st leg	2nd leg	Aggregate
2016–17	EHF Cup	R3	(Germany) VfL Oldenburg	25–27	21–31	46–58
