= Danish Handball Cup 2018 (women's handball) =

2018 Danish Handball Cup
Tournament details
- Country: Denmark

Final positions
- Champions: Nykøbing Falster Håndboldklub
- Runner-up: Odense Håndbold

Tournament statistics
- Top goal scorer(s): Lærke Nolsøe (21 goals)

Awards
- Best player: Mette Tranborg

The 2018 Danish Handball Cup (Danish: DHF's Landspokalturnering 2018), known as Santander Cup 2018 for sponsorship reasons, is the 55th edition of the national women's handball cup tournament. Team Esbjerg are the defending champions.

== Format ==
The initial 6 rounds are managed by the regional federations with the DHF taking over the tournament at the round of 16. It ultimately results in a final four event between Christmas and New Year. The winner of the tournament qualify for the Super Cup where they meet the season's league winner. If the same team wins both the league and the cup, the losing cup finalist will be participating in the Super Cup.

== Round of 32 ==
The round of 32 ties were scheduled through March to May 2018.

Team 1	Score	Team 2
27 March
Hasle KFUM	16–27	Hadsten Håndbold
10 April
CHK Århus	11–40	SønderjyskE Håndbold
11 April
HIK	17–37	København Håndbold
DHG Odense	25–28	Roskilde Håndbold
12 April
TMS Ringsted	19–31	Odense Håndbold
17 April
Lyngby HK	24–25	Ajax København
Nøvling IF	13–33	Randers HK
25 April
AGF Håndbold	23–37	Aarhus United
1 May
Aars HK	15–39	Herning-Ikast Håndbold
2 May
EH Aalborg	28–36	Silkeborg-Voel KFUM
3 May
Gudme HK	19–34	Nykøbing Falster Håndboldklub
SIF Ansager	15–37	Ringkøbing Håndbold
5 May
Fredericia HK	22–29	TTH Holstebro
14 May
Bjerringbro FH	25–30	Team Esbjerg
15 May
Vendsyssel Håndbold	27–37	Viborg HK
17 May
Horsens HK	21–22	Skanderborg Håndbold

== Round of 16 ==
The round of 16 ties were scheduled for 14–23 August 2018.

Team 1	Score	Team 2
14 August
Roskilde Håndbold	23–32	Randers HK
22 August
Aarhus United	28–29	Silkeborg-Voel KFUM
Ajax København	17–20	Herning-Ikast Håndbold
Hadsten Håndbold	16–37	Team Esbjerg
Skanderborg Håndbold	21–26	Nykøbing Falster Håndboldklub
23 August
Ringkøbing Håndbold	13–28	København Håndbold
SønderjyskE Håndbold	14–33	Odense Håndbold
24 August
TTH Holstebro	26–31	Viborg HK

== Quarter-finals ==
The quarter-final ties were scheduled for 17–20 September 2018.

Team 1	Score	Team 2
17 September
Herning-Ikast Håndbold	15–18	Nykøbing Falster Håndboldklub
18 September
København Håndbold	26–27	Randers HK
Silkeborg-Voel KFUM	25–29	Odense Håndbold
20 September
Viborg HK	21–21 (e.t.) (24–25)	Team Esbjerg

== Final4 ==
The final four event is scheduled for 29–30 December 2017 in Blue Water Dokken, Esbjerg.

Semi-finals
29 December
Randers HK	18
Nykøbing Falster Håndbold	37
29 December
Team Esbjerg	25
Odense Håndbold	27

Final
30 December
Nykøbing Falster Håndbold	28
Odense Håndbold	26
Bronze medal match
30 December
Randers HK	32
Team Esbjerg	26

=== Semi-finals ===
29 December 2017; 13:30 (CEST)	Randers HK	18–37	Nykøbing Falster Håndboldklub	Blue Water Dokken, Esbjerg; Attendance: 2,137; Referees: Pedersen, Nygaard
29 December 2017; 13:30 (CEST)	Mørch Hansen 4	(7–19)	Nolsøe 9	Blue Water Dokken, Esbjerg; Attendance: 2,137; Referees: Pedersen, Nygaard
29 December 2017; 13:30 (CEST)	5× (suspension)	Report	3× (suspension)	Blue Water Dokken, Esbjerg; Attendance: 2,137; Referees: Pedersen, Nygaard

29 December 2017; 16:00 (CEST)	Team Esbjerg	25–27	Odense Håndbold	Blue Water Dokken, Esbjerg; Attendance: 2,500; Referees: Christiansen, Hesseldal
29 December 2017; 16:00 (CEST)	Polman 10	(15–8)	Tranborg 7	Blue Water Dokken, Esbjerg; Attendance: 2,500; Referees: Christiansen, Hesseldal
29 December 2017; 16:00 (CEST)	2× (yellow card) 3× (suspension)	Report	4× (yellow card) 3× (suspension)	Blue Water Dokken, Esbjerg; Attendance: 2,500; Referees: Christiansen, Hesseldal

=== Bronze medal match ===
30 December 2017; 13:30 (CEST)	Randers HK	26–32	Team Esbjerg	Blue Water Dokken, Esbjerg; Attendance: 3,000; Referees: Skjøth Søegaard, Kalisz Nielsen
30 December 2017; 13:30 (CEST)	Pedersen 5	(13–21)	Liščević 8	Blue Water Dokken, Esbjerg; Attendance: 3,000; Referees: Skjøth Søegaard, Kalisz Nielsen
30 December 2017; 13:30 (CEST)	1× (yellow card) 3× (suspension)	Report	1× (yellow card) 4× (suspension)	Blue Water Dokken, Esbjerg; Attendance: 3,000; Referees: Skjøth Søegaard, Kalisz Nielsen

=== Final ===
30 December 2017; 16:00 (CEST)	Nykøbing Falster Håndboldklub	28–26	Odense Håndbold	Blue Water Dokken, Esbjerg; Attendance: 3,000; Referees: Dahl Hermann, Madsen
30 December 2017; 16:00 (CEST)	Wallén 5	(15–13)	Tranborg 6	Blue Water Dokken, Esbjerg; Attendance: 3,000; Referees: Dahl Hermann, Madsen
30 December 2017; 16:00 (CEST)	1× (yellow card) 3× (suspension)	Report	3× (yellow card) 6× (suspension)	Blue Water Dokken, Esbjerg; Attendance: 3,000; Referees: Dahl Hermann, Madsen

== Final ranking and statistics ==
=== Top goalscorers ===
Counted from the round of 16 when DHF took over the tournament.

As of 30 December 2018

Rank	Player	Club	Goals
1	(Denmark) Lærke Nolsøe	Nykøbing Falster Håndbold	21
2	(Netherlands) Estavana Polman	Team Esbjerg	18
3	(Serbia) Kristina Liščević	Team Esbjerg	18
4	(Netherlands) Dione Housheer	Nykøbing Falster Håndbold	16
5	(Denmark) Mie Højlund	Odense Håndbold	15
5	(Denmark) Sabine Pedersen	Randers HK	15
7	(Denmark) Camilla Dalby	Randers HK	14
7	(Norway) Marit Røsberg Jacobsen	Team Esbjerg	14
7	(Sweden) Emelie Westberg	Nykøbing Falster Håndbold	14
10	(Denmark) Mia Rej	København Håndbold	13
10	(Norway) Sanna Solberg	Team Esbjerg	13

Danish Handball Cup 2018 winners

Nykøbing Falster Håndboldklub
First title

Team roster: Cecilie Greve, Sakura Hauge, Dione Housheer, Ayaka Ikehara, Isabella Jacobsen, Matilde Kondrup Nielsen, Kristina Kristiansen, Anna Lagerquist, Lærke Nolsøe, Sofie Olsen, Line Skak, Yui Sunami, Angelica Wallén, Emelie Westberg, Johanna Westberg
Head coach: Jakob Larsen

=== Most valuable player ===
MVP was announced after the final on 30 December 2018.

Most valuable player: Mette Tranborg (DEN)
