= Karen Klokker =

Danish handball player (born 1997)

Personal information
- Full name: Karen Klokker Poulsen
- Nationality: Danish
- Born: 15 February 2002 (age 24) Denmark
- Height: 1.85 m (6 ft 1 in)

Sport
- Sport: Handball
- Position: Pivot
- Current club: Silkeborg-Voel KFUM
- Number: 15

Youth career
- Years: Team
- –: Kerteminde
- –: Odense Håndbold
- 2019–2021: Skanderborg Håndbold

Senior clubs
- Years: Team
- 2021–2022: Skanderborg Håndbold
- 2022: Randers HK
- 2022–2023: Viborg HK
- 2023–2025: Silkeborg-Voel KFUM
- 2025–: Ikast Håndbold
National team
Years	Team	Apps	(Gls)
2025–	Denmark	3	(1)
- Updated on 7 June 2026

Karen Klokker Poulsen (born 15 February 2002) is a Danish handball player who currently plays for Silkeborg-Voel KFUM and the Danish national team.

== Playing career ==
She started her career at Kerteminde and Odense. At Skanderborg Håndbold, she made her senior debut in the 2021-22 season. In her first season she played 5 matches, scoring two goals. The following season she joined Randers HK. Here she would however not play for long, as Randers went bankrupt the same season. She then joined Viborg HK on an amateur contract for the rest of the season. Due to lack of playing time at Viborg HK, and when Silkeborg-Voel KFUM was lacking a line player, when Line Skak was out with pregnancy leave, she joined Silkeborg-Voel on loan. In November 2024, while she was on loan at Silkeborg-Voel, it was announced that Ikast Håndbold had bought Klokker out of her contract at Viborg HK. She then signed a three-year deal with Ikast Håndbold starting from the 2025–26 season. Her contract with Viborg HK went until 2026.

While she was on loan at Silkeborg-Voel KFUM she was called up to the Danish national team for the first time for the Golden League in March 2025. She made her debut on March 6, 2025, in a 29–26 win against Norway.
