= 2021–22 Damehåndboldligaen =

Damehåndboldligaen
- Season: 2021–22
- Dates: 31 August 2021 - 31 May 2022
- Champion: Odense Håndbold (2nd title)
- Relegated: Holstebro Håndbold
- Champions League: Odense Håndbold; Team Esbjerg
- EHF European League: Viborg HK; Ikast Håndbold; Nykøbing Falster HB
- Matches played: 232
- Top goalscorer: (Norway) Henny Reistad (245 goals)
- Biggest home win: 19 goals - HIH 34-15 HOL (15 Sep); VHK 44-25 RIN (12 Jan)
- Biggest away win: 16 goals VHK 31-15 SKA (8 Sep)
- Highest scoring: 73 goals ESB 39-34 KBH (8 Sep)
- Longest winning run: 13 matches Odense Håndbold (1 Sep 2021 - 5 Jan 2022)
- Highest attendance: Team Esbjerg (25,857)
- Lowest attendance: Skanderborg Håndbold (9,913)

The 2021–22 Damehåndboldligaen (known as Bambusa Kvindeligaen for sponsorship reasons) was the 86th season of Damehåndboldligaen, Denmark's premier women's handball league. Odense Håndbold were the defending champions, while Ringkøbing Håndbold promoted from the 1. division.

Odense Håndbold won the title, as they beat Team Esbjerg in the finals. Holstebro Håndbold were relegated, as they finished last in the regular season.

== Team information ==
Locations of the 2021–22 Damehåndboldligaen

| Team. | Town | Arena | Capacity |
|---|---|---|---|
| Aarhus United | Aarhus | Ceres Arena Stadionhal | 1.200 |
| Ajax København | København | Bavnehøj-Hallen | 1.000 |
| Herning-Ikast Håndbold | Ikast | IBF Arena | 2.850 |
| HH Elite | Horsens | Forum Horsens | 4.000 |
| København Håndbold | København | Frederiksberghallen | 1.468 |
| Nykøbing Falster Håndboldklub | Nykøbing Falster; Næstved | LÅNLET Arena; Næstved Arena | 1.300; 2,500 |
| Odense Håndbold | Odense | Odense Idrætshal | 2.256 |
| Randers HK | Randers | Arena Randers | 3.000 |
| Silkeborg-Voel KFUM | Silkeborg | Jysk Arena | 3.000 |
| Skanderborg Håndbold | Skanderborg | Skanderborg Fælled | 1.700 |
| Team Esbjerg | Esbjerg | Blue Water Dokken | 2.549 |
| Holstebro Håndbold | Holstebro | Gråkjær Arena | 3.250 |
| Ringkøbing Håndbold | Ringkøbing | Green Sports Arena | 1.200 |
| Viborg HK | Viborg | Vibocold Arena Viborg | 3.000 |

=== Head coaches ===
| Team | Head coach |
|---|---|
| København Håndbold | (Denmark) Claus Mogensen |
| Silkeborg-Voel KFUM | (Denmark) Jakob Andreasen |
| Odense Håndbold | (Denmark) Ulrik Kirkely |
| Team Esbjerg | (Denmark) Jesper Jensen |
| Ringkøbing Håndbold | (Denmark) Jesper Holmris |
| Holstebro Håndbold | (Sweden) Pether Krautmeyer |
| Nykøbing Falster HK | (Greenland) Jakob Larsen |
| Ajax København | (Denmark) Rasmus Poulsen |
| Viborg HK | (Denmark) Jakob Vestergaard |
| Aarhus United | (Denmark) Heine Eriksen |
| Herning-Ikast Håndbold | (Denmark) Kasper Christensen |
| Randers HK | (Denmark) Ole Bitsch |
| Skanderborg Håndbold | (Denmark) Jeppe Vestergaard |
| HH Elite | (Denmark) Jan Leslie |

== Regular season ==
=== Standings ===
| Pos | Team | Pld | W | D | L | GF | GA | GD | Pts | Qualification or relegation |
|---|---|---|---|---|---|---|---|---|---|---|
| 1 | Odense Håndbold | 26 | 25 | 0 | 1 | 817 | 606 | +211 | 50 | Championship play-offs + advance to Champions League |
| 2 | Team Esbjerg | 26 | 22 | 1 | 3 | 864 | 705 | +159 | 45 | Championship play-offs |
| 3 | Herning-Ikast Håndbold | 26 | 19 | 1 | 6 | 783 | 632 | +151 | 39 | Championship play-offs |
| 4 | Viborg HK | 26 | 19 | 1 | 6 | 813 | 696 | +117 | 39 | Championship play-offs |
| 5 | Nykøbing Falster Håndbold | 26 | 14 | 1 | 11 | 739 | 724 | +15 | 29 | Championship play-offs |
| 6 | Silkeborg-Voel KFUM | 26 | 10 | 7 | 9 | 744 | 726 | +18 | 27 | Championship play-offs |
| 7 | HH Elite | 26 | 13 | 0 | 13 | 670 | 679 | −9 | 26 | Championship play-offs |
| 8 | København Håndbold | 26 | 11 | 2 | 13 | 690 | 729 | −39 | 24 | Championship play-offs |
| 9 | Aarhus United | 26 | 10 | 2 | 14 | 664 | 678 | −14 | 22 | |
| 10 | Ajax København | 26 | 7 | 2 | 17 | 630 | 744 | −114 | 16 | |
| 11 | Skanderborg Håndbold | 26 | 7 | 1 | 18 | 613 | 756 | −143 | 15 | |
| 12 | Randers HK | 26 | 6 | 2 | 18 | 658 | 723 | −65 | 14 | |
| 13 | Ringkøbing Håndbold | 26 | 6 | 0 | 20 | 673 | 783 | −110 | 12 | |
| 14 | Holstebro Håndbold | 26 | 2 | 2 | 22 | 621 | 798 | −177 | 6 | Relegation to 1. division |

Rules for classification: 1.) Points in head-to-head matches amongst tied teams; 2.) Goal difference in head-to-head matches amongst tied teams; 3.) Goals scored in head-to-head matches among tied teams; 4.) Points in all matches; 5.) Goal difference in all matches.

== Championship Playoffs ==
=== Group 1 ===
| Pos | Team | Pld | W | D | L | GF | GA | GD | Pts | Qualification |
|---|---|---|---|---|---|---|---|---|---|---|
| 1 | Odense Håndbold | 6 | 6 | 0 | 0 | 190 | 153 | +37 | 14 | Semifinals |
| 2 | Viborg HK | 6 | 3 | 0 | 3 | 181 | 164 | +17 | 7 | Semifinals |
| 3 | Nykøbing Falster Håndboldklub | 6 | 3 | 0 | 3 | 165 | 176 | −11 | 6 | |
| 4 | København Håndbold | 6 | 0 | 0 | 6 | 162 | 205 | −43 | 0 | |

Source: DHF
Rules for classification: 1) points; 2) head-to-head; 3) goals in head-to-haed; 4) goal difference 5) goals scored.

Resultats

| Home / Away | KBH | VHK | ODE | NFH |
|---|---|---|---|---|
| København Håndbold | | 25–39 | 32–35 | 25–28 |
| Viborg HK | 37–25 | | 29–30 | 28–22 |
| Odense Håndbold | 30–24 | 30–21 | | 38–21 |
| Nykøbing Falster HK | 36–31 | 32-29 | 26–27 | |

=== Group 2 ===
| Pos | Team | Pld | W | D | L | GF | GA | GD | Pts | Qualification |
|---|---|---|---|---|---|---|---|---|---|---|
| 1 | Team Esbjerg | 6 | 5 | 1 | 0 | 193 | 163 | +30 | 13 | Semifinals |
| 2 | Herning-Ikast Håndbold | 6 | 3 | 1 | 2 | 171 | 159 | +12 | 8 | Semifinals |
| 3 | Silkeborg-Voel KFUM | 6 | 2 | 1 | 3 | 160 | 178 | −18 | 5 | |
| 4 | HH Elite | 6 | 0 | 1 | 5 | 153 | 177 | −24 | 1 | |

Source: DHF
Rules for classification: 1) points; 2) head-to-head; 3) goals in head-to-haed; 4) goal difference 5) goals scored.

Resultats

| Home / Away | HER | HOR | ESB | SIL |
|---|---|---|---|---|
| Herning-Ikast Håndbold | | 29–27 | 28–30 | 31–21 |
| HH Elite | 22–29 | | 27–27 | 25–27 |
| Team Esbjerg | 32–27 | 34–27 | | 35–26 |
| Silkeborg-Voel KFUM | 27–27 | 31–25 | 28–35 | |

=== Semifinals ===
| Date | | | Home team in the 1st match & 3rd match | Home team in the 2nd match | Results | | |
| 1st match | 2nd match | 3rd match | Home team in the 1st match & 3rd match | Home team in the 2nd match | 1st match | 2nd match | 3rd match |
|---|---|---|---|---|---|---|---|
| 10 May | 18 May | 21 May | Odense Håndbold | Ikast Håndbold | 24–31 | 30–24 | 29–23 |
| 11 May | 18 May | - | Team Esbjerg | Viborg HK | 31–31 | 28–29 | - |

! Best of three matches. In the case of a tie after the second match, a third match is played. Highest ranking team in the regular season has the home advantage in the first and possible third match.

=== 3rd place ===
| Date | | | Home team in the 1st match & 3rd match | Home team in the 2nd match | Results | | |
| 1st match | 2nd match | 3rd match | Home team in the 1st match & 3rd match | Home team in the 2nd match | 1st match | 2nd match | 3rd match |
|---|---|---|---|---|---|---|---|
| 24 May | 28 May | 31 May | Ikast Håndbold | Viborg HK | 33–16 | 23-24 | 29-21 |

! Best of three matches. In the case of a tie after the second match, a third match is played. Highest ranking team in the regular season has the home advantage in the first and possible third match.

=== Final ===
| Date | | | Home team in the 1st match & 3rd match | Home team in the 2nd match | Results | | |
| 1st match | 2nd match | 3rd match | Home team in the 1st match & 3rd match | Home team in the 2nd match | 1st match | 2nd match | 3rd match |
|---|---|---|---|---|---|---|---|
| 24 May | 28 May | 31 May | Odense Håndbold | Team Esbjerg | 31–27 | 28-35 | 25-24 |

! Best of three matches. In the case of a tie after the second match, a third match is played. Highest ranking team in the regular season has the home advantage in the first and possible third match.

== Season statistics ==
=== Top goalscorers ===
As of 1 September 2022

==== Regular season ====
| Rank | Player | Club | Goals |
|---|---|---|---|
| 1 | (Denmark) Mathilde Neesgaard | Aarhus United | 179 |
| 2 | (Norway) Henny Reistad | Team Esbjerg | 153 |
| 3 | (Denmark) Kristina Jørgensen | Viborg HK | 147 |
| 4 | (Denmark) Ann Grete Nørgaard | Silkeborg-Voel KFUM | 143 |
| 4 | (Denmark) Laura Damgaard | Horsens HE | 143 |
| 6 | (Netherlands) Dione Housheer | Odense Håndbold | 134 |
| 7 | (Denmark) Julie Holm | Ringkøbing HB | 121 |
| 8 | (Norway) Eira Aune | Silkeborg-Voel KFUM | 120 |
| 8 | (Sweden) Melissa Petrén | København Håndbold | 120 |
| 10 | (Denmark) Emilie Ytting Pedersen | Skanderborg Håndbold | 118 |
| 10 | (Denmark) Sofie Bardrum | Ajax København | 118 |

==== Overall ====
| Rank | Player | Club | Goals |
|---|---|---|---|
| 1 | (Norway) Henny Reistad | Team Esbjerg | 245 |
| 2 | (Denmark) Kristina Jørgensen | Viborg HK | 213 |
| 3 | (Netherlands) Dione Housheer | Odense Håndbold | 206 |
| 4 | (Denmark) Mathilde Neesgaard | Aarhus United | 204 |
| 5 | (Denmark) Ann Grete Nørgaard | Silkeborg-Voel KFUM | 182 |
| 6 | (Denmark) Laura Damgaard | HH Elite | 180 |
| 7 | (Denmark) Emma Friis | Ikast Håndbold | 162 |
| 8 | (Sweden) Melissa Petrén | København Håndbold | 157 |
| 9 | (Norway) Kristine Breistøl | Team Esbjerg | 153 |
| 10 | (Denmark) Line Haugsted | Viborg HK | 150 |

=== Monthly awards ===
| Month | Player of the Month | |
| Month | Player | Club |
|---|---|---|
| September | (Denmark) Mia Rej | Odense Håndbold |
| October | (Denmark) Line Haugsted | Viborg HK |
| November | (Denmark) Sofie Flader | Nykøbing Falster Håndboldklub |
| January | (Norway) Eira Aune | Silkeborg-Voel KFUM |
| February | (Denmark) Mathilde Neesgaard | Aarhus United Elitehandball |
| March | (Norway) Henny Reistad | Team Esbjerg |
| April | (Denmark) Kristina Jørgensen | Viborg HK |
| May | (Norway) Henny Reistad | Team Esbjerg |

=== Coach of the season ===
(Denmark) Jesper Jensen - Team Esbjerg

== Number of teams by regions ==
| No. teams | Region | Teams |
|---|---|---|
| 9 | Midtjylland | Aarhus United, Herning-Ikast Håndbold, HH Elite, Randers HK, Silkeborg-Voel KFUM, Skanderborg Håndbold, Holstebro Håndbold, Viborg HK, Ringkøbing Håndbold |
| 2 | Hovedstaden | København Håndbold, Ajax København |
| 2 | Syddanmark | Team Esbjerg, Odense Håndbold |
| 1 | Sjælland | Nykøbing Falster Håndboldklub |
