= Tiril =

Tiril is a given name. Notable people with the given name include:

- Tiril Bue (born 1993), Norwegian competitive sailor
- Tiril Sjåstad Christiansen (born 1995), Norwegian freestyle skier
- Tiril Eckhoff (born 1990), Norwegian biathlete
- Tiril Merg (born 1993), Norwegian handball player
- Tiril Udnes Weng (born 1996), Norwegian cross-country skier
