= Celine Lundbye Kristiansen =

Danish handball player (born 1996)

Celine Lundbye
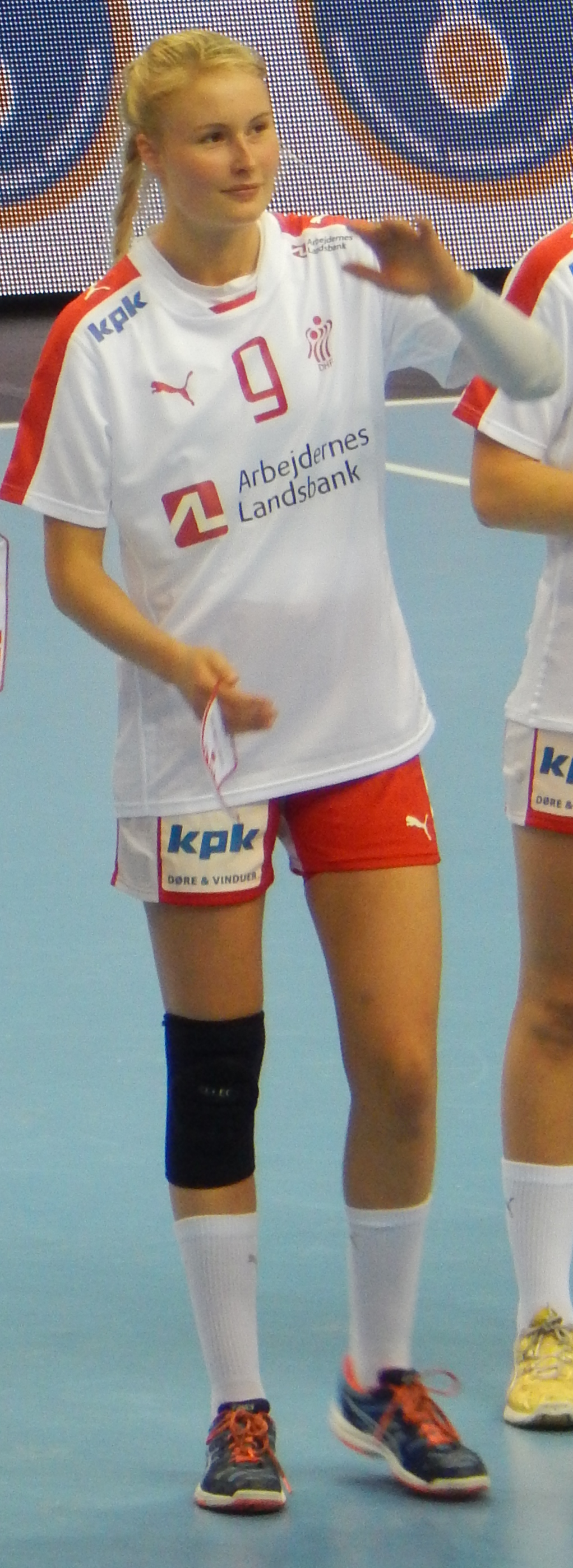

Personal information
- Full name: Celine Lundbye Kristiansen
- Nationality: Danish
- Born: 24 May 1996 (age 30) Gentofte, Denmark
- Height: 1.78 m (5 ft 10 in)

Sport
- Sport: Handball
- Position: Right Back
- Current club: København Håndbold
- Number: 49

Senior clubs
- Years: Team
- 2014-2015: København Håndbold
- 2014-2015: Hellerup IK
- 2015-2016: Lyngby HK
- 2016-2018: Nykøbing Falster
- 2018-2020: Aarhus United
- 2020-2022: Nykøbing Falster
- 2022-: København Håndbold
National team
| Years | Team | Apps | (Gls) |
| 2018- | Denmark | 7 | (6) |
Medal record
IHF Junior World Championship
| Gold medal – first place | 2016 Russia |
IHF Youth World Championship
| Bronze medal – third place | 2014 Macedonia |
European Junior Championship
| Gold medal – first place | 2015 Spain |
European Youth Championship
| Bronze medal – third place | 2013 Poland |

Celine Lundbye Kristiansen (born 24 May 1996) is a Danish handball player who plays for København Håndbold and the Danish national team.

== International honours ==
- Danish Championship:
  - Winner: 2017
