= Pernille Holmsgaard =

Danish handball player (born 1984)

Pernille Holst Holmsgaard
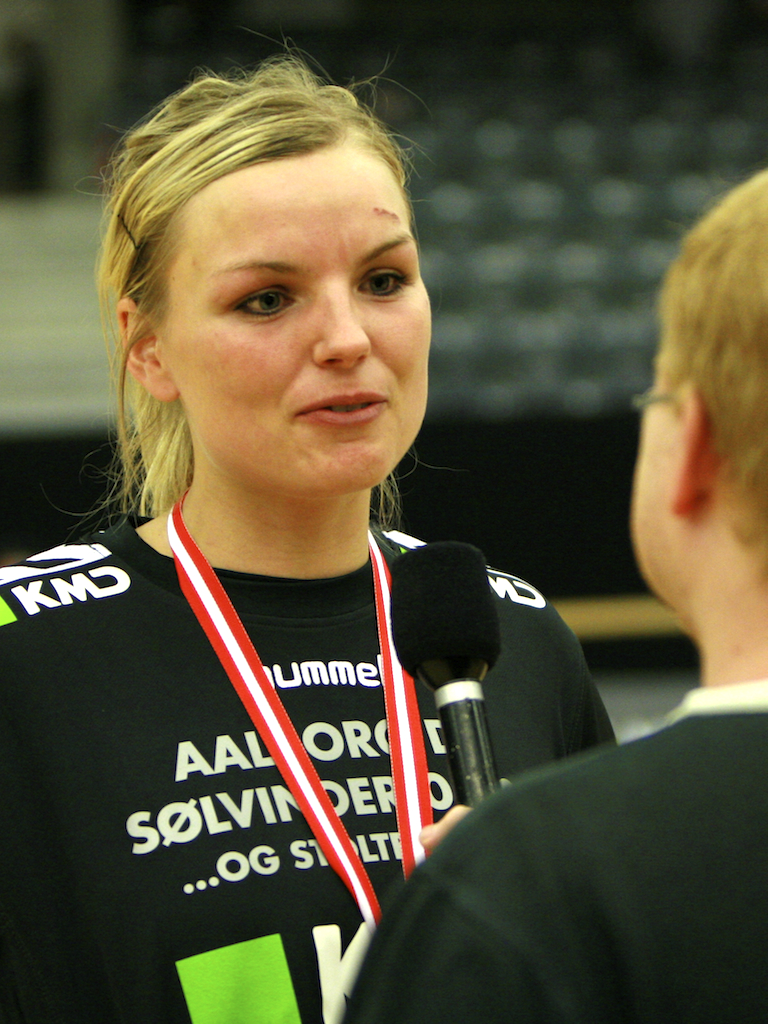

Personal information
- Nationality: Danish
- Born: 6 September 1984 (age 42) Pandrup, Denmark
- Height: 1.84 m (6 ft 0 in)

Sport
- Sport: Handball
- Position: Left back
- Current club: retired

Youth career
- Years: Team
- –: Jetsmark HK

Senior clubs
- Years: Team
- –2007: Horsens HK
- 2007–2009: Aalborg DH
- 2009–2011: HC Odense
- 2011–2013: Viborg HK
- 2013–2016: København Håndbold
- 2016–2017: Nykøbing F. Håndboldklub
National team
Years	Team	Apps	(Gls)
2006–2017	Denmark	136	(124)
Medal record
World Championship
Bronze medal – third place	2013 Serbia

Pernille Holst Holmsgaard (née Larsen, born 6 September 1984) is a Danish former handball player, who last played for Nykøbing Falster Håndboldklub and for the Danish women's national handball team.

At the 2010 European Women's Handball Championship she reached the bronze final and placed fourth with the Danish team.

At the 2013 World Championship, she was a part of the Danish team that won bronze medals, breaking a 9-year streak without medals for the Danish team. They beat Poland 30–26.

In 2017 she won the Danish Championship with Nykøbing Falster HK; the first time the club won the Danish championship.
