= Mette Tranborg =

Danish handball player (born 1996)

Personal information
- Nationality: Danish
- Born: 1 January 1996 (age 30) Aarhus, Denmark
- Height: 1.92 m (6 ft 4 in)

Sport
- Sport: Handball
- Position: Right back
- Current club: Ferencvárosi TC
- Number: 18

Youth career
- Years: Team
- –: VRI
- –: SK Aarhus

Senior clubs
- Years: Team
- 2012–2017: SK Aarhus
- 2017–2020: Odense Håndbold
- 2020–2025: Team Esbjerg
- 2025–: Ferencvárosi TC
National team
Years	Team	Apps	(Gls)
2014–	Denmark	129	(281)
Medal record
Olympic Games
Bronze medal – third place	2024 Paris	Team
World Championship
Bronze medal – third place	2021 Spain
European Championship
Silver medal – second place	2022 Slovenia/North Macedonia/Montenegro
Silver medal – second place	2024 Austria/Hungary/Switzerland
IHF Junior World Championship
Bronze medal – third place	2014 Croatia
IHF Youth World Championship
Gold medal – first place	2012 Montenegro
European Junior Championship
Bronze medal – third place	2013 Denmark
- Updated on 3 December 2025

Mette Tranborg (born 1 January 1996) is a Danish handball player for Ferencvárosi TC and the Danish national team.

== Club career ==
Mette Tranborg broke though the SK Aarhus first team at the age of 16. She was the first player in Danish league to be exempted from the minimum age requirements to play. She was awarded the Best Female Talent in the Danish league in the 2014/2015 season.

In 2017 she switched to league rivals Odense Håndbold, where she was one of the key players for 2.5 seasons. She missed the last half season due to a Cruciate ligament injury.

In 2020 she switched to Team Esbjerg. In the 2021-22 season she came second in the Danish Championship. In the final, she missed a second shot against Odense Håndbold, which would have taken the final to extra time. The year after she won the Danish Championship. In April 2025 it was announced that from the 2025–26 season she would join Hungarian Ferencvaros.

== National team ==
Tranborg was part of the Danish youth team that won gold medals at the 2012 Women's Youth World Handball Championship. At the 2013 Women's U-19 European Handball Championship and the 2014 Women's Junior World Handball Championship she won bronze medals.

She played her first match for the Danish senior national team on 4 June 2014. Her first major international tournament was the 2014 European Championship.

At the 2021 World Women's Handball Championship she won bronze medals, and silver medals at the 2022 European Championship.

She missed the 2023 World Championship due to a cruciate ligament injury.

At the 2024 Olympics she won bronze medals. This was the first time the Denmark team participated in the Olympics in 12 years.

As the injury was still nagging her and due to exhaustion after the Olympics, she opted out of participating in the 2024 European Championship. She did however enter the squad after an injury to Stine Eiberg. She then went on to she win silver medals losing to Norway in the final.

She missed the 2025 World Women's Handball Championship due to injury.

== Achievements ==
=== Club competitions ===
- Danish Championship:
  - Winner: 2023, 2024
  - Silver Medalist: 2018, 2022, 2025
- Danish Cup:
  - Winner: 2021, 2022
  - Runners-up: 2018
- EHF Champions League
  - Bronze Medalist: 2024-25

== Individual awards ==
- MVP (Danish: pokalfighter) of the Danish Handball Cup: 2018
- Youth player of the Year in Damehåndboldligaen: 2014/15
