= Ann Grete Nørgaard =

Danish handball player (born 1983)

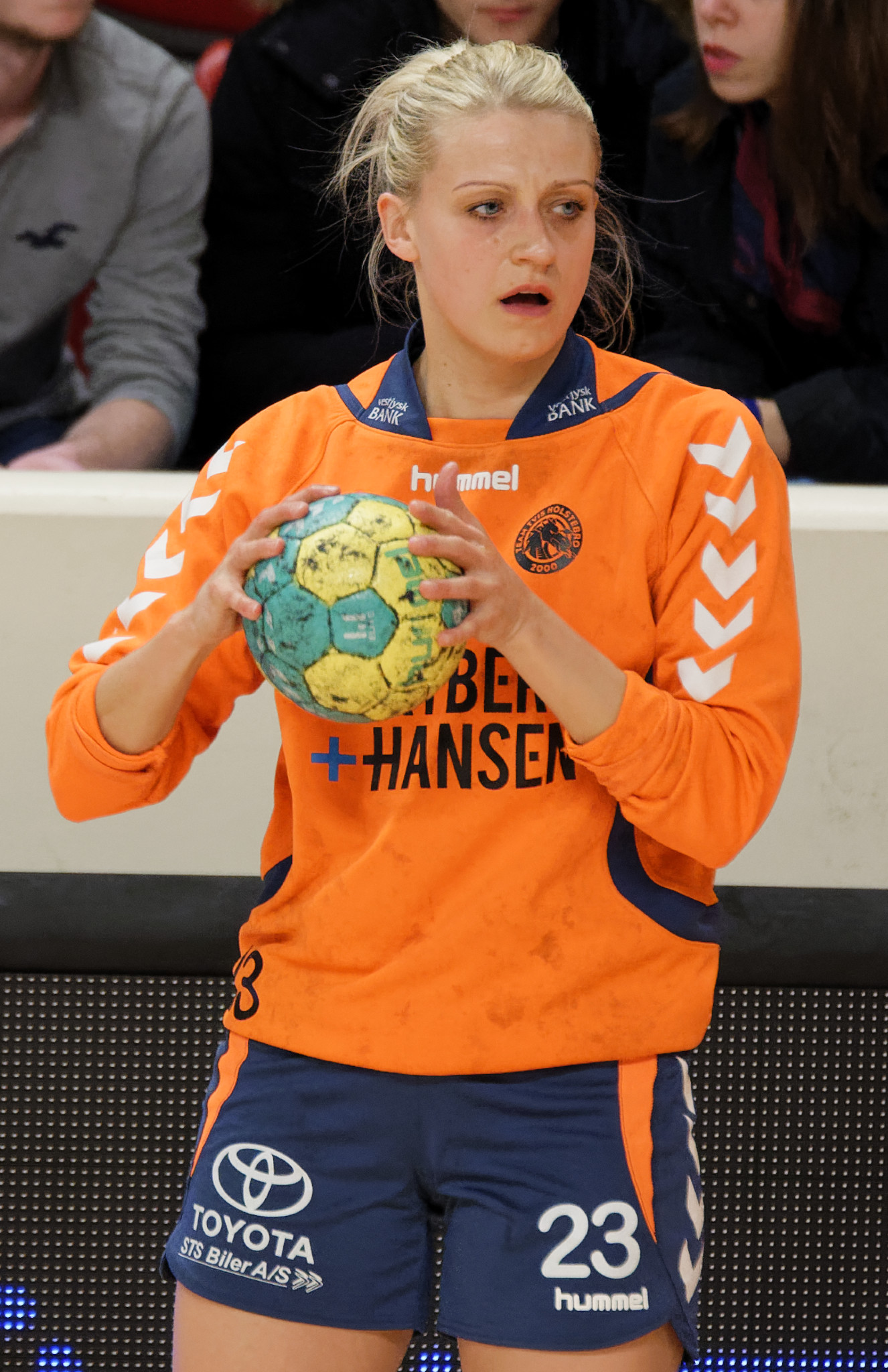
- Ann Grete Nørgaard in 2015

Personal information
- Nationality: Danish
- Born: 15 September 1983 (age 43) Viborg, Denmark
- Height: 1.62 m (5 ft 4 in)

Sport
- Sport: Handball
- Position: Left wing

Senior clubs
- Years: Team
- 2000–2006: Viborg HK
- 2006–2008: Randers HK
- 2008–2009: Viborg HK
- 2009–2010: Horsens HK
- 2010–2015: Team Tvis Holstebro
- 2015–2019: Viborg HK
- 2019–2020: SCM Râmnicu Vâlcea
- 2021: Storhamar HE
- 2021–2022: Silkeborg-Voel KFUM
National team
Years	Team	Apps	(Gls)
2007–2016	Denmark	139	(549)
Medal record
World Championship
Bronze medal – third place	2013 Serbia

Ann Grete Nørgaard Østerballe (born 15 September 1983) is a Danish former professional handballer. She represented the Denmark women's national team, and has been called one the best Danish wing players of all time.

== Career ==
=== Viborg HK ===
Nørgaard started playing handball in 1992 at Søndermarken IK. At the age of 17 she joined Viborg HK. Early in her career, it was difficult to find playing time as the Danish national team player Henriette Mikkelsen was the undisputed first choice. In the 2004–05 and 2005–06 seasons she was loaned out to the Danish First Division team Skive fH, which at the time acted as a satellite team to Viborg HK.

=== Randers HK ===
In 2006, after returning from the second loan she left Viborg HK, and joined league rivals Randers HK. In 2007 she extended her contract with Randers until 2010. However, already in the beginning of the 2008–09 season, she had her contract cancelled by mutual consent with the club. She and the team's head coach, Martin Albertsen, had come to a disagreement when Nørgaard was not selected for the team sheet in a match on 20 September 2008, against Slagelse FH. Nørgaard took the club to court for failing to live up to the contract. In the end of October 2008 Nørgaard, helped by the labour union for Danish handball players, Håndbold Spiller Foreningen, entered an agreement with the club and withdrew the case. The agreement made the club pay an economic compensation to Nørgaard.

=== Second period at Viborg HK ===
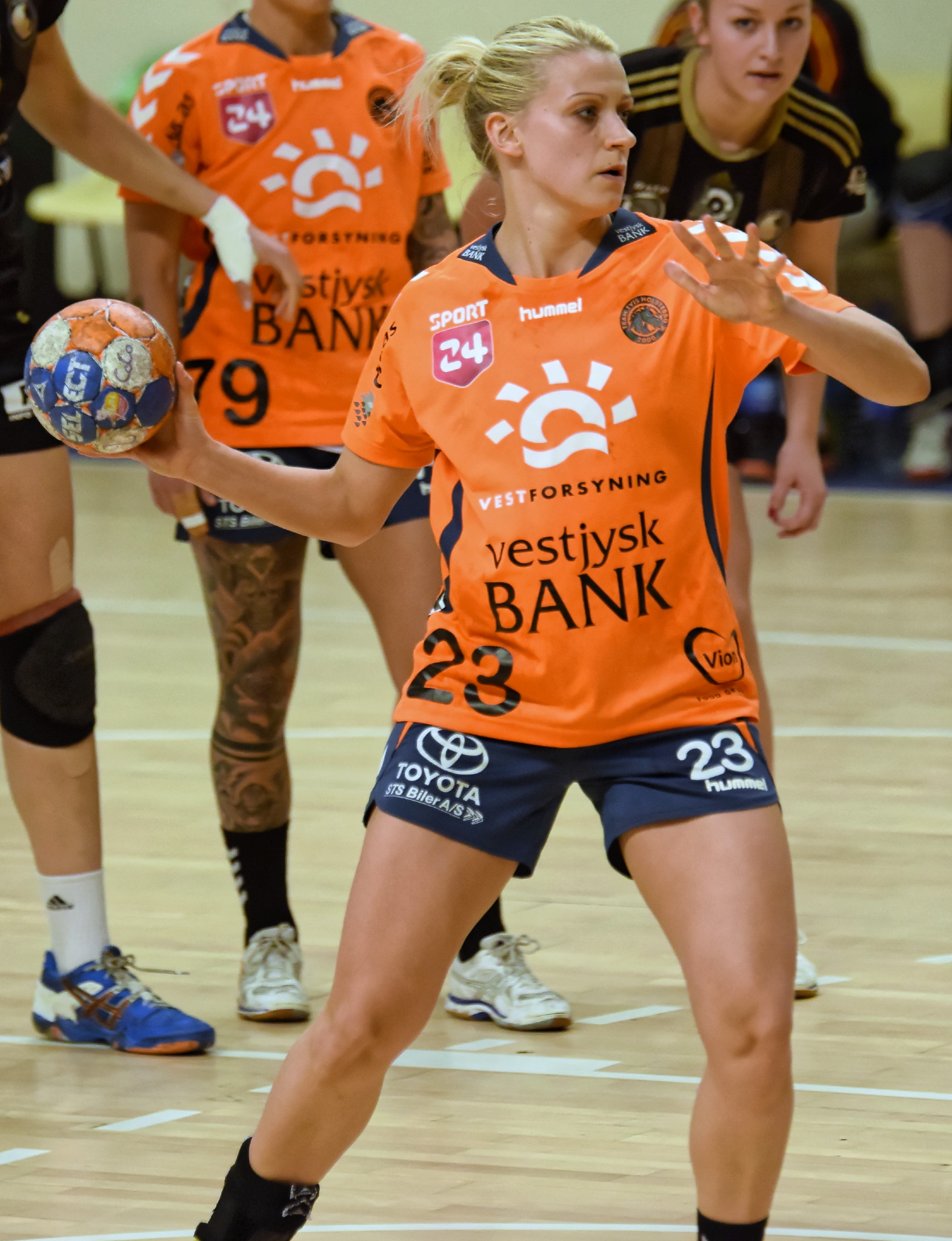
Nørgaard for TTH in March 2015, in an EHF Cup Match against Issy Paris Hand

Because of the 2008 Economic Crisis, she could not find another professional team, and she therefore played for Viborg HK's second team, which was an amateur team in the 2nd Division, the 3rd tier of Danish handball. Her chance to return to professional handball came, when Gitte Aaen was injured in March 2009, which gave her a spot in the Viborg HK first team. Two months later they won the Danish Championship and the EHF Champions League with the club.

=== Horsens HK ===
The following summer she joined Horsens HK. She played one season at the club, where she was the team top scorer. After the team got relegated, many players including Nørgaard, were released of their contracts. She then joined TTH Holstebro on a one-year contract. She played with the club for five years, where she was the first choice wing, while often sharing playing time with Lærke Nolsøe. She reached the final of the 2010-11 EHF Cup with the club. She was shared top scorer at the tournament, shared with her teammate Kristina Kristiansen, with 71 goals. The year after she won the 2013 EHF Cup, beating Metz Handball in the final. In 2015 she and TTH won the EHF Cup again, this time beating Russian Rostov-Don.

=== Third period at Viborg HK ===
In 2015 she returned once again to Viborg HK. In 2017 she extended her contract until 2020.

=== SCM Râmnicu Vâlcea and Storhamar ===
In 2019 she joined Romanian team SCM Râmnicu Vâlcea. Later the same year in December 2020, when the team informed its players, that their wages would be cut, she left the team. Instead she joined Norwegian team Storhamar Håndball. Because of the COVID-19 pandemic, the Norwegian league was cancelled, and therefore she did not play a lot of matches in Norway.

=== Silkeborg-Voel ===
In 2021 she returned to Denmark and joined Silkeborg-Voel KFUM. A year later she retired.

=== National team ===
Nørgaard debuted for the Danish national team on 28 February 2007, against Sweden. In the 2010s she was one of the key players, and was often the public face of the team. She is also one of the most scoring players on the Danish national team ever.

Her first Major international tournament was the 2010 Handball Championship, where she was the second choice on the wing to Mie Augustesen. She also participated in the 2011 World Championship, where she was the starter. Here she had one of her most iconic moments, when she equalized in the last second in the round of 16 against Japan.

At both the 2012 Olympics and at the 2012 European Championship she was the top scorer at the Danish team. Denmark finished 9th and 5th respectively.

At the 2013 World Championship she was on the Danish team that won a medal for the first time in 9 years, beating Poland in the third place play-off 30:26.

As Denmark did not qualify for the 2016 Olympics, she missed a major tournament for the first time. Afterwards she slipped out of favour in the Danish national team. Her last match for Denmark was on 20 March 2016, against Uruguay.

== Post-playing career ==
Since 2022 she has worked as a handball expert on Danish television, especially the EHF Champions League and EHF European League. She has also worked as a teacher at Hald Ege Efterskole, a Danish boarding school specializing in elite sport talent development.

== International honours ==
- EHF Champions League:
  - Winner: 2006
  - Finalist: 2001
- EHF Cup:
  - Winner: 2004, 2013
  - Finalist: 2011
- World Championship:
  - Bronze Medalist: 2013
- Norwegian League
  - Silver: 2020/2021

== Individual awards ==
- All-Star Left Wing of the Danish Handball League: 2008, 2011, 2013, 2015, 2017
- Top scorer im the Danish League: 2018 (178 goals)

== Personal life ==
She is an educated teacher from VIA University College in Skive as of 2010, being specialised in the subjects Mathematics, Social Studies, History and Science.
