= Sofie Olsen =

Danish handball player (born 1995)

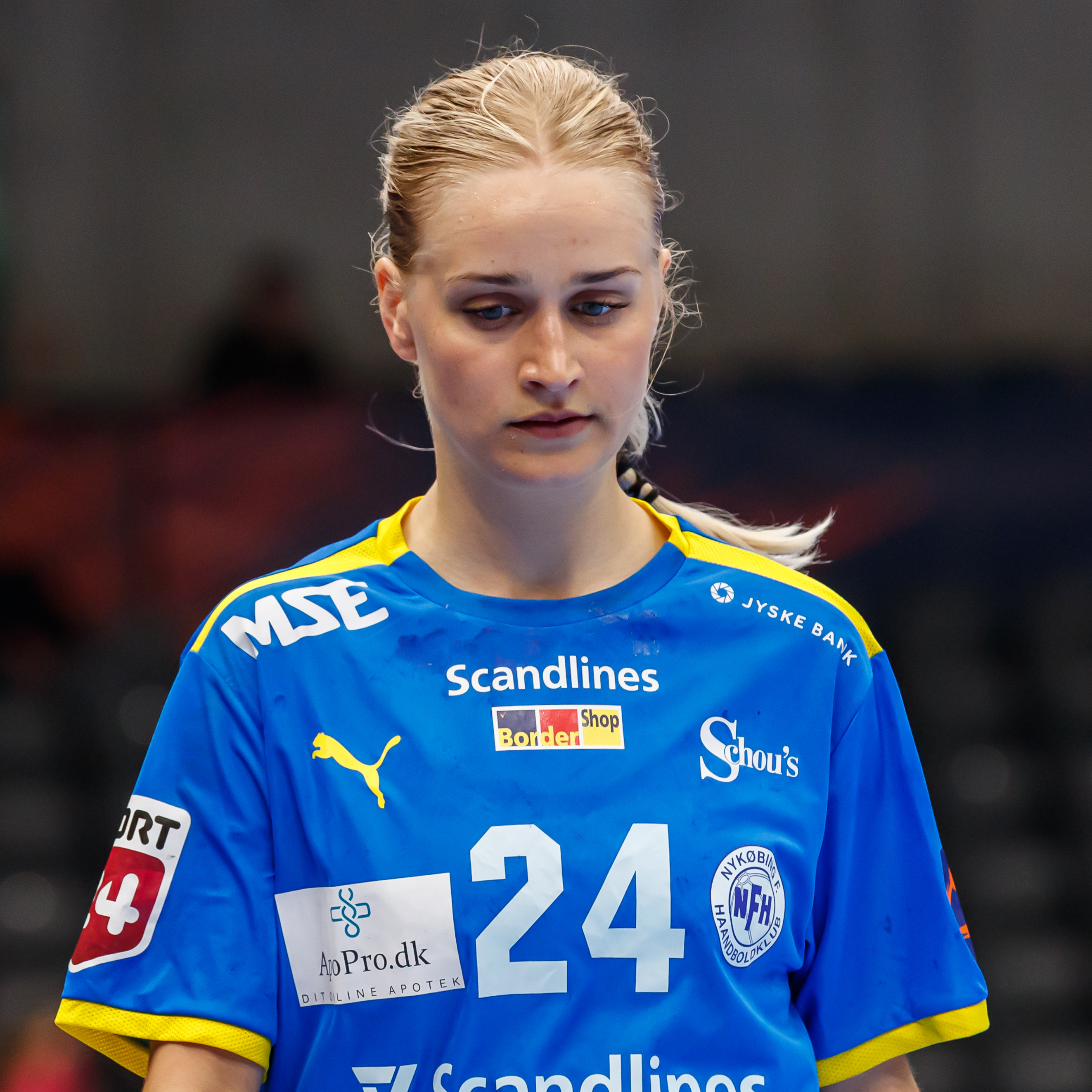

Personal information
- Full name: Sofie Amalie Olsen
- Nationality: Danish
- Born: 16 February 1995 (age 31) Frederiksberg, Denmark
- Height: 1.78 m (5 ft 10 in)

Sport
- Sport: Handball
- Position: Right wing
- Current club: Nykøbing Falster Håndboldklub
- Number: 24

Youth career
- Years: Team
- 2012-2014: Midtjylland Håndbold

Senior clubs
- Years: Team
- 2014-2015: Rødovre HK
- 2015-2017: Ajax København
- 2017-2023: Nykøbing Falster Håndboldklub
Medal record
IHF Junior World Championship
Bronze medal – third place	2014 Croatia
IHF Youth World Championship
Gold medal – first place	2012 Montenegro
European Youth Championship
Silver medal – second place	2011 Czech Republic

Sofie Olsen (born 16 February 1995) is a Danish former handball player who played most of her career for Nykøbing Falster Håndboldklub. With NFH she won the Danish cup in 2018. She retired in 2023 at age 28. She has however not ruled out returning to handball in the future.

She started her career at Ajax København, where she won the Danish 1st Division in the 2016/17 season.

She was brought to Nykøbing Falster Håndboldklub explicitly as a backup to Japanese player Ayaka Ikehara, but since Ikehara suffered a tear to the cruciate ligament the same season, she soon became a regular for the club.

When Charlotte Mikkelsen arrived to NFH in 2021, Sofie Olsen once again became a backup player. And once again after her teammate suffered a cruciate ligament injury, Sofie Olsen found herself the starter of her team.
