= Eira Aune =

Norwegian handball player (born 1997)

Personal information
- Full name: Eira Aune
- Nationality: Norwegian
- Born: 10 March 1997 (age 29) Lillestrøm, Norway
- Height: 1.76 m (5 ft 9 in)

Sport
- Sport: Handball
- Position: Left back
- Current club: Retired

Senior clubs
- Years: Team
- 2016–2017: Fjellhammer IL
- 2017–2020: Oppsal Håndball
- 2020–2023: Silkeborg-Voel KFUM
- 2023–2025: Oppsal Håndball

Eira Aune (born 10 March 1997) is a retired Norwegian handball who last played for Oppsal Håndball and the Norwegian national recruit team.

On 25 April 2020, Aune signed a 2-year contract with Silkeborg-Voel KFUM in the Danish Women's Handball League. In October 2021, she extended her contract with the club until the summer of 2024.

She was called up for the Norwegian national recruit team in April 2022, for training camp in Oslo.

== Individual awards ==
- Player of the Month (January) in the Damehåndboldligaen: 2021/2022
