= Laura Borg =

Danish handball player (born 2004)

Laura Borg Thestrup
Personal information
- Full name: Laura Maria Borg Thestrup
- Nationality: Danish
- Born: 21 February 2004 (age 22) Køge, Denmark
- Height: 1.84 m (6 ft 0 in)

Sport
- Sport: Handball
- Position: Left back
- Current club: Ikast Håndbold
- Number: 6

Youth career
- Years: Team
- 2020–2021: Køge Håndbold
- 2021–2022: Skanderborg Håndbold

Senior clubs
- Years: Team
- 2022–2023: Skanderborg Håndbold
- 2023–2026: Viborg HK
- 2026–: Ikast Håndbold
National team
Years	Team	Apps	(Gls)
2025–	Denmark	20	(7)
- Updated on 27 August 2026

Laura Maria Borg Thestrup (born 21 February 2004) is a Danish handball player for Ikast Håndbold and the Danish national team.

In October 2024, she was first selected to represent Denmark in a tournament. She made her official debut on 6 March 2025 against Norway. Later the same year she played her first major international tournament at the 2025 World Championship replacing Sarah Iversen and Rikke Iversen. Denmark went out in the quarterfinal to France after winning all matches in the group stages. This was the first time since 2019 that Denmark left a major international tournament without any medals. Borg was used mainly in defense while Sofie Bardrum was used on offense.
