= Mie Sørensen =

Danish handball player (born 1994)

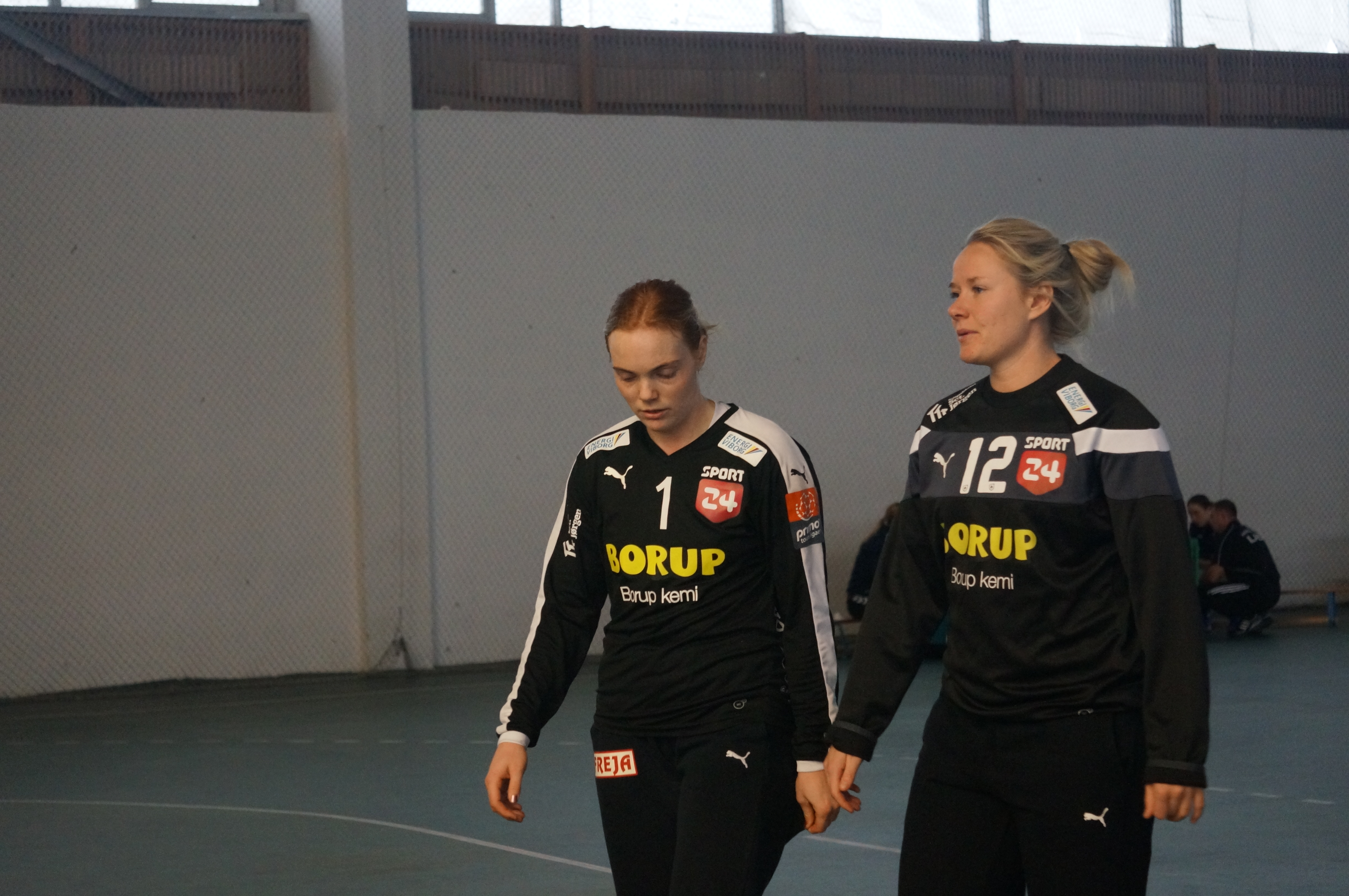
- Mie Sørensen in a Women's EHF Cup match in 2016

Personal information
- Nationality: Danish
- Born: 21 May 1994 (age 32) Aalborg, Denmark
- Height: 1.75 m (5 ft 9 in)

Sport
- Sport: Handball
- Position: Goalkeeper
- Current club: Boden Håndboll IF
- Number: 16

Senior clubs
- Years: Team
- -2013: Aalborg DH
- 2013-2016: SønderjyskE Håndbold
- 2016-2017: Viborg HK
- 2017-2018: Nykøbing Falster
- 2018: Molde Elite
- 2018-2019: Skrim Kongsberg
- 2019-: Boden Handboll IF

Mie Sørensen (born 21. May 1994) is a Danish handball player who plays for Swedish club Boden Handboll IF. She arrived at the club in 2019 and extended her contract in 2021 and again in 2023
