= Sofie Bardrum =

Danish handball player (born 1996)

Personal information
- Full name: Sofie Bardrum-Larsen
- Nationality: Danish
- Born: 3 April 1996 (age 30) Svendborg, Denmark
- Height: 1.73 m (5 ft 8 in)

Sport
- Sport: Handball
- Position: Pivot
- Current club: Viborg HK
- Number: 34

Senior clubs
- Years: Team
- 2014–2018: Gudme HK
- 2018–2022: Ajax København
- 2022–2025: Nykøbing Falster Håndboldklub
- 2025–2026: RK Krim
- 2026: HC Dunărea Brăila
- 2026–: Viborg HK
National team
Years	Team	Apps	(Gls)
2025–	Denmark	13	(37)

Sofie Bardurm-Larsen (born 3 April 1996) is a Danish female handball player for Viborg HK and the Danish national team.

== Career ==
She has previously played for Gudme HK and for Ajax København where she had her breakthrough in the Danish Women's Handball League. As a youth player she played as a back before converting to pivot in order to have a better chance at making it pro. In December 2021, she signed a two-year contract with Danish top-tier club Nykøbing Falster Håndboldklub. In 2024, the team reached the final in the Kvindeligaen, but was defeated by Team Esbjerg in two matches. She was also a silver medalist in the 2022–23 Women's EHF European League.

In the summer of 2025, she moved to Slovenian RK Krim, after three seasons with Nykøbing Falster Håndboldklub.

In September 2025, she was selected for the Danish national team for the first time against Iceland, replacing Karen Klokker. Later the same year she played at her first major international tournament at the 2025 World Championship replacing Sarah Iversen and Rikke Iversen. Denmark went out in the quarterfinal to France after winning all matches in the group stages. This was the first time since 2019 that Denmark left a major international tournament without any medals. Bardrum was used mainly in offence while Laura Borg was used on defense.

== Achievements ==
- Damehåndboldligaen:
  - Silver Medalist: 2024
- EHF European League:
  - Silver Medalist: 2023
