= Stine Eiberg =

Danish handball player (born 1998)

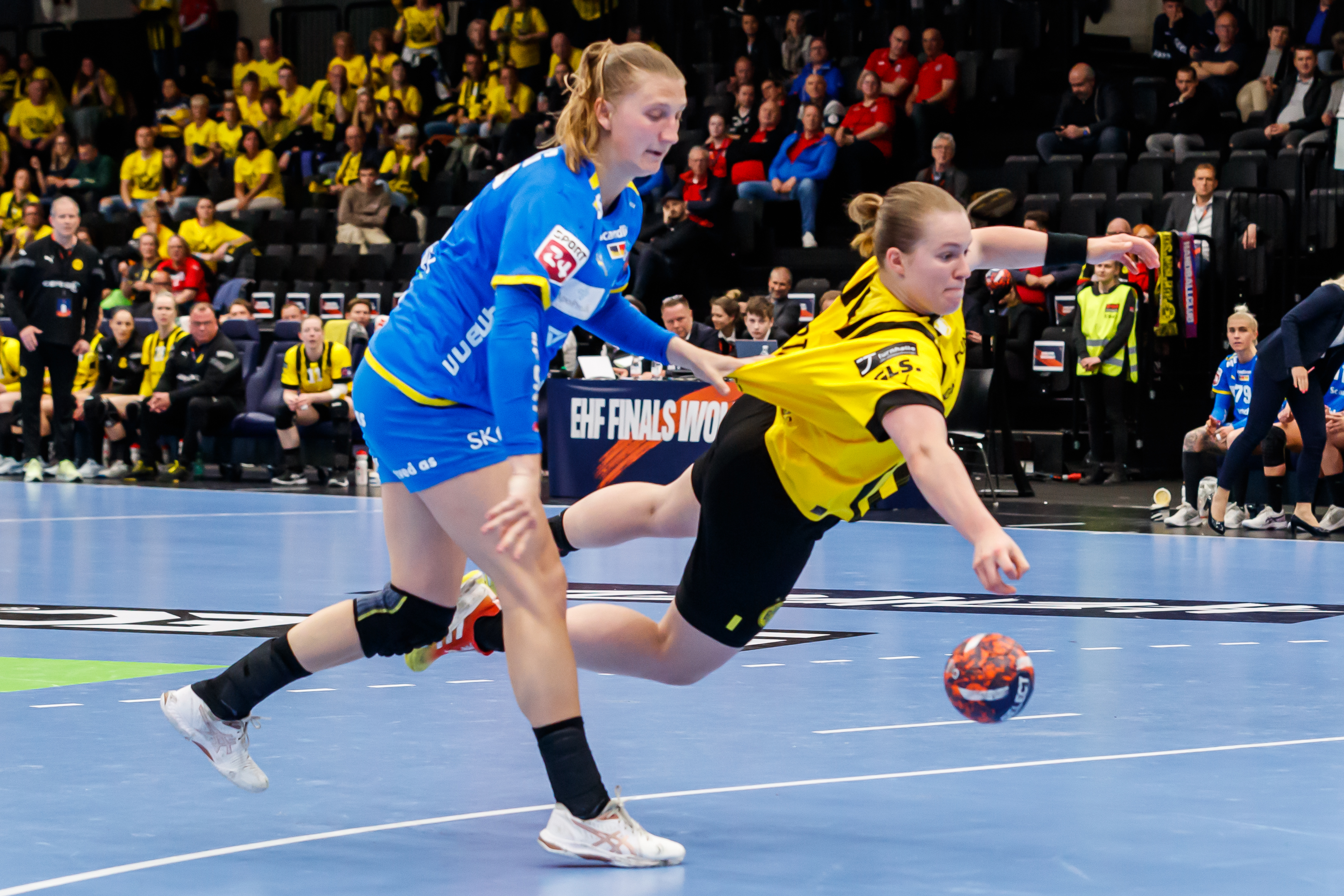
- Stine Eiberg (left) in a duel with Lisa Antl in May 2023

Personal information
- Full name: Stine Eiberg Jørgensen
- Nationality: Danish
- Born: 25 November 1998 (age 27) Høje Taastrup, Denmark
- Height: 1.81 m (5 ft 11 in)

Sport
- Sport: Handball
- Position: Left back
- Current club: Nykøbing Falster Håndboldklub
- Number: 8

Youth career
- Years: Team
- -2012: Taastrup Idræts Klub
- 2012-2017: Ajax København

Senior clubs
- Years: Team
- 2017–2022: Ajax København
- 2022–: Nykøbing Falster Håndboldklub
National team
Years	Team	Apps	(Gls)
2024–	Denmark	20	(6)
Medal record
European Championship
Silver medal – second place	2024 Austria/Hungary/Switzerland
- Updated on 12 April 2026

Stine Eiberg Jørgensen (born 25 November 1998) is a Danish female handball player for Nykøbing Falster Håndboldklub and the Danish national team.

Her father, Lars Eiberg Jørgensen, and mother, Heidi Holm were also professional handball players, and so is her sister, Maja Eiberg Jørgensen.

== Career ==
Eiberg started playing handball at the age of 7 at Taastrup Idræts Klub. In 2012 she switched to Ajax København to join the youth team. In 2017 she debuted for the senior team in the Damehåndboldligaen, the top division in Denmark.

In 2022 she joined league rivals Nykøbing Falster Håndboldklub. Here she reached the finals in the EHF European League in 2023. In February 2025 she extended her contract at the club until the end of the 2025–2026 season.

She made her debut on the Danish national team on 24 October 2024, against Netherlands. A few days later, she was part of the official Danish squad for the 2024 European Women's Handball Championship. Here she won silver medals, losing to Norway in the final. She was however injured during the tournament, and was replaced by Mette Tranborg.

== Achievements ==
- Danish Handball League:
  - Silver Medalist: 2024
- European Women's Handball Championship
  - Silver Medalist: 2024
