= Alberte Kielstrup Madsen =

Danish handball player (born 2000)

Alberte Kielstrup
Personal information
- Full name: Alberte Kielstrup Madsen
- Nationality: Danish
- Born: 15 September 2000 (age 26) Assens, Denmark
- Height: 1.85 m (6 ft 1 in)

Sport
- Sport: Handball
- Position: Right back
- Current club: SCM Râmnicu Vâlcea
- Number: 18

Youth career
- Years: Team
- 2010–2017: Aarup BK

Senior clubs
- Years: Team
- 2018–2019: DHG Odense
- 2019–2020: Odense Håndbold
- 2020–2021: DHG Odense
- 2021–2025: Nykøbing Falster Håndboldklub
- 2025–: SCM Râmnicu Vâlcea
National team
- Years: Team
- –: Denmark
Medal record
European Championship
Silver medal – second place	2022 Slovenia/North Macedonia/Montenegro

Alberte Kielstrup Madsen (born 15 September 2000) is a Danish handball player for SCM Râmnicu Vâlcea and the Danish national team.

She was selected as part of the Danish 20-player squad for the 2022 European Women's Handball Championship, but was not in action. Madsen also participated at the 2017 European Women's U-17 Handball Championship, placing 6th.

== Achievements ==
- Danish League:
  - Winner: 2021
  - Runners-up: 2020
- Danish Cup
  - Winner: 2020
  - Runners-up: 2019
