= Mette Iversen Sahlholdt =

Danish handball player (born 1977)

Personal information
- Nationality: Danish
- Born: 22 July 1977 (age 49) Svendborg, Denmark
- Height: 1.77 m (5 ft 10 in)

Sport
- Sport: Handball
- Position: Goalkeeper
- Current club: Nykøbing Falster
- Number: 1

Senior clubs
- Years: Team
- 1997-2009: GOG Håndbold
- 2009-2012: Odense Håndbold
- 2012-2017: Nykøbing Falster
National team
Years	Team	Apps	(Gls)
2001-2015	Denmark	45	(0)

Mette Iversen Sahlholdt (born 22 July 1977) is a Danish retired handball player, who last played for Nykøbing Falster and the Danish national team. She is a goalkeeping coach for Nykøbing Falster Håndboldklub.

She participated at the 2015 World Women's Handball Championship.

In the last match of her career, she won the Danish Championship with Nykøbing Falster HK, beating København Håndbold in the final. This was the first time the club won the Danish championship.
