= Nykøbing Falster Håndboldklub =

Handball club from Nykøbing Falster, Denmark

- Short name: NFH
- Founded: 2009; 17 years ago
- Arena: Guldboxen, Nykøbing Falster
- Capacity: 3,000
- President: Kenneth Sahlholdt
- Head coach: Niels Agesen
- League: Bambusa Kvindeligaen
- 2025–26: 3rd
- Club colours
| Home | Away |

Location of NFH

Nykøbing Falster Håndboldklub (Nykøbing Falster Handball Club) is a Danish professional handball club from Nykøbing Falster. In the 2024–25 season, the club competes in the Danish Women's Handball League. They have a local rivalry with København Håndbold.

== History ==
Nykøbing Falster was promoted to the top league in Denmark, Damehåndboldligaen, for the first time for 2012-13, by winning the 1st Division in 2011-12.

In their first season in the top league, they finished 11th, which meant relegation/promotion play-off matches against SK Århus. They would go on to lose, but due to Vejen EH's bankruptcy, the club could stay in the league. In 2014-15 they finished last, but once again they were saved by a team withdrawing; this time by Skive fH.

In March 2015 it was announced that the club had signed Kristina Kristiansen from the 2016-17 season. This signaled that the team would ramp up investment, and it sparked public interest in the, at the time, relatively obscure team. The following season they had the highest viewership numbers in the Danish handball league, men's or women's.

In 2017 they won the Danish Championship for the first time in club history.

== Kits ==
HOME
| 2017-20 | 2020- |

AWAY
2019-20

== Results ==
- Danish Championship
  - Gold: 2017
  - Finalist: 2024
  - Third-place: 2026
- Danish Cup
  - Winner: 2018
  - Runners-up: 2020, 2023
- Danish Super Cup:
  - Winner: 2017
- EHF European League:
  - Runners-up: 2023
  - Semifinalist: 2017

== Team ==
=== Current squad ===
Squad for the 2026–27 season.

Goalkeepers

- 12 (Denmark) Andrea Nørklit
- 14 (Denmark) Anne Christine Bossen
- 32 (Denmark) Cecilie Greve

Wingers
LW

- 19 (Denmark) Laura Andersen
- 30 (Sweden) Clara Lerby

RW

- 4 (Norway) Tiril Jørstad Palm
- 20 (Norway) Maja Magnussen

Line players

- 2 (Norway) Caroline Aar Jakobsen (pregnant)
- 23 (Denmark) Nanna Hinnerfeldt
- 29 (Sweden) Isabelle Rydén

Back players
LB

- 7 (Denmark) Cecilie Bjerre
- 9 (Faroe Islands) Marita Mortensen
- 10 (Norway) Mia Svele

CB

- 21 (Denmark) Alberte Hovgaard-Hansen
- 26 (Norway) Mona Obaidli
- 79 (Denmark) Kristina Kristiansen (c)

RB

- 3 (Denmark) Clara Bang
- 6 (Norway) Moa Högdahl Schønningsen

DF

- 8 (Denmark) Stine Eiberg

Squad information
| No. | Nat. | Player | Position | Date of Birth | In | Contract until | Previous club |
|---|---|---|---|---|---|---|---|
| 2 | (Norway) | Caroline Aar Jakobsen | Line player | 27 December 1994 | 2023 | 2027 | (Norway) Byåsen HE |
| 3 | (Denmark) | Clara Bang | Right back | 30 April 2004 | 2025 | 2027 | (Denmark) Skanderborg Håndbold |
| 4 | (Norway) | Tiril Jørstad Palm | Left wing | 1 April 2003 | 2025 | 2028 | (Norway) Gjerpen IF |
| 6 | (Norway) | Moa Högdahl Schønningsen | Right back | 14 March 1996 | 2023 | 2027 | (Denmark) Viborg HK |
| 7 | (Denmark) | Cecilie Bjerre | Left back | 8 July 2001 | 2025 | 2027 | (Denmark) Ringkøbing Håndbold |
| 8 | (Denmark) | Stine Eiberg Jørgensen | Left back | 26 November 1998 | 2022 | 2026 | (Denmark) Ajax København |
| 10 | (Norway) | Mia Svele | Playmaker | 16 April 2001 | 2025 | 2026 | (Norway) Storhamar HE |
| 11 | (Denmark) | Sofie Lundsgaard | Playmaker | 18 August 2006 | 2025 | 2026 | (Denmark) EH Aalborg |
| 14 | (Denmark) | Anne Christine Bossen | Goalkeeper | 14 October 2003 | 2025 | 2027 | (Denmark) København Håndbold |
| 20 | (Norway) | Maja Magnussen | Right wing | 30 June 1997 | 2024 | 2026 | (Norway) Sola HK |
| 21 | (Denmark) | Matilde Vestergaard | Left wing | 11 September 2004 | 2023 | 2026 | (Denmark) HH Elite |
| 22 | (Netherlands) | Zoë Sprengers | Left wing | 19 January 2000 | 2024 | 2026 | (Germany) Borussia Dortmund |
| 23 | (Denmark) | Nanna Hinnerfeldt | Line player | 11 July 1999 | 2025 | 2027 | (Denmark) Ringkøbing Håndbold |
| 26 | (Norway) | Mona Obaidli | Playmaker | 17 February 1997 | 2023 | 2027 | (Norway) Molde Elite |
| 30 | (Sweden) | Clara Lerby | Left wing | 8 May 1999 | 2025 | 2027 | (Denmark) EH Aalborg |
| 32 | (Denmark) | Cecilie Greve | Goalkeeper | 19 January 1992 | 2017 | 2026 | (Denmark) Randers HK |
| 79 | (Denmark) | Kristina Kristiansen | Playmaker | 13 July 1989 | 2015 | 2027 | (Denmark) TTH Holstebro |

=== Technical staff ===
- (Denmark) Head Coach: Niels Agesen
- (Denmark) Assistant coach: Mikkel Thomassen
- (Denmark) Goalkeeping coach: Mette Iversen Sahlholdt
- (Denmark) Team Leader: Britta Carstensen
- (Denmark) Team Leader: Per Knudsen
- (Denmark) Masseur: Klaus Frederiksen
- (Denmark) Physiotherapist: Philippa Jones

=== Transfers ===
Transfers for the season 2027–28

Joining

- (Faroe Islands) Jana Mittún (CB) (from (Denmark) Viborg HK)
- (Denmark) Boline Laursen (P) (from (Denmark) Silkeborg-Voel KFUM)
- (Norway) Maja Furu Sæteren (LB) (from (Norway) Larvik HK)

Leaving

- (Denmark) Kristina Kristiansen (CB)
- (Norway) Mia Svele (CB) (to (Denmark) Odense Håndbold)
- (Norway) Caroline Aar Jakobsen (P) (retires)

=== Previous squads ===
2018–2019 Team
| Shirt No | Nationality | Player | Birth Date | Position |
|---|---|---|---|---|
| 2 | Denmark | Matilde Kondrup Nielsen | 9 February 1995 (age 31) | Left wing |
| 3 | Sweden | Emelie Westberg | 6 April 1990 (age 36) | Left back |
| 4 | Japan | Yui Sunami | 7 June 1991 (age 35) | Right back |
| 5 | Sweden | Johanna Westberg | 6 April 1990 (age 36) | Left back |
| 11 | Denmark | Pernille Johannsen | 26 September 1996 (age 30) | Right wing |
| 14 | Denmark | Isabella Jacobsen | 24 December 1997 (age 28) | Left back |
| 16 | Denmark | Mette Iversen Sahlholdt | 22 July 1977 (age 49) | Goalkeeper |
| 19 | Sweden | Anna Lagerquist | 16 October 1993 (age 33) | Pivot |
| 21 | Japan | Ayaka Ikehara | 24 September 1990 (age 36) | Right wing |
| 22 | Denmark | Lærke Nolsøe | 19 April 1996 (age 30) | Left wing |
| 24 | Denmark | Sofie Olsen | 16 February 1995 (age 31) | Right wing |
| 32 | Denmark | Cecilie Greve | 19 January 1992 (age 34) | Goalkeeper |
| 39 | Sweden | Angelica Wallén | 11 April 1986 (age 40) | Right back |
| 48 | Netherlands | Dione Housheer | 26 September 1999 (age 27) | Right back |
| 79 | Denmark | Kristina Kristiansen | 7 January 1987 (age 39) | Playmaker |
| 87 | Japan | Sakura Hauge | 11 April 1986 (age 40) | Goalkeeper |
| 93 | Denmark | Line Skak | 6 April 1997 (age 29) | Pivot |

2017–2018 Team
| Shirt No | Nationality | Player | Birth Date | Position |
|---|---|---|---|---|
| 2 | Denmark | Matilde Kondrup Nielsen | 9 February 1995 (age 31) | Left wing |
| 3 | Sweden | Emelie Westberg | 6 April 1990 (age 36) | Left back |
| 5 | Sweden | Johanna Westberg | 6 April 1990 (age 36) | Left back |
| 8 | Norway | Tiril Merg | 2 September 1993 (age 33) | Left Back |
| 11 | Denmark | Sarah Iversen | 10 April 1990 (age 36) | Pivot |
| 12 | Denmark | Mie Sørensen | 21 May 1994 (age 32) | Goalkeeper |
| 19 | Sweden | Anna Lagerquist | 16 October 1993 (age 33) | Pivot |
| 21 | Japan | Ayaka Ikehara | 24 September 1990 (age 36) | Right wing |
| 22 | Denmark | Lærke Nolsøe | 19 April 1996 (age 30) | Left wing |
| 24 | Denmark | Sofie Olsen | 16 February 1995 (age 31) | Right wing |
| 32 | Denmark | Cecilie Greve | 19 January 1992 (age 34) | Goalkeeper |
| 39 | Sweden | Angelica Wallén | 11 April 1986 (age 40) | Right back |
| 49 | Denmark | Celine Lundbye Kristiansen | 24 May 1996 (age 30) | Right back |
| 79 | Denmark | Kristina Kristiansen | 13 July 1989 (age 37) | Playmaker |

2016–2017 Team
| Shirt No | Nationality | Player | Birth Date | Position |
|---|---|---|---|---|
| 1 | Denmark | Mette Iversen Sahlholdt | 22 July 1977 (age 49) | Goalkeeper |
| 2 | Denmark | Louise Kristensen | 4 September 1992 (age 34) | Right wing |
| 3 | Sweden | Emelie Westberg | 6 April 1990 (age 36) | Left back |
| 4 | Sweden | Nathalie Hagman | 19 July 1991 (age 35) | Right back |
| 5 | Sweden | Johanna Westberg | 6 April 1990 (age 36) | Left back |
| 6 | Denmark | Mette Gravholt | 12 December 1984 (age 41) | Pivot |
| 7 | Denmark | Emma Navne | 18 December 1997 (age 28) | Playmaker |
| 11 | Denmark | Sarah Iversen | 10 April 1990 (age 36) | Pivot |
| 15 | Denmark | Pernille Holst Holmsgaard | 6 September 1984 (age 42) | Left back |
| 16 | Denmark | Ditte Vind | 2 January 1994 (age 32) | Goalkeeper |
| 22 | Denmark | Lærke Nolsøe | 19 April 1996 (age 30) | Left wing |
| 26 | Denmark | Nadia de Zoete Kongsted | 14 August 1995 (age 31) | Right wing |
| 33 | Denmark | Rikke Ebbesen | 13 June 1992 (age 34) | Left wing |
| 49 | Denmark | Celine Lundbye Kristiansen | 24 May 1996 (age 30) | Right back |
| 79 | Denmark | Kristina Kristiansen | 13 July 1989 (age 37) | Playmaker |
| 88 | Brazil | Mariana Costa | 14 October 1992 (age 34) | Right wing |

=== Notable former players ===
- (Denmark) Camilla Fangel (2012–2015)
- (Denmark) Rikke Iversen (2012–2014)
- (Denmark) Mia Møldrup (2012–2015)
- (Denmark) Cecilie Woller (2012–2015)
- (Denmark) Althea Reinhardt (2007–2015)
- (Denmark) Berit Kristensen (1997–1999)
- (Denmark) Mette Iversen Sahlholdt (2013–2017)
- (Denmark) Mette Gravholt (2015–2017)
- (Denmark) Mie Sørensen (2017–2018)
- (Denmark) Celine Lundbye Kristiansen (2016–2018)
- (Denmark) Line Skak (2018–2019)
- (Denmark) Sarah Iversen (2009–2012) (2016–2018)
- (Denmark) Marianne Florman (2005)
- (Denmark) Pernille Holmsgaard (2016–2017)
- (Denmark) Matilde Kondrup Nielsen (2017–2020)
- (Denmark) Cecilie Greve (2017–2026)
- (Denmark) Lærke Nolsøe (2016–2021, 2023–2024)
- (Denmark) Elma Halilcevic (2021–2023)
- (Brazil) Elaine Gomes (2014–2016)
- (Brazil) Mayara Moura (2014–2015)
- (Brazil) Karoline de Souza (2014–2016)
- (Brazil) Bárbara Arenhart (2015–2016)
- (Brazil) Mariana Costa (2015–2017)
- (Brazil) Deonise Fachinello (2016)
- (Sweden) Johanna Westberg (2016–2022)
- (Sweden) Anna Lagerquist (2017–2020)
- (Sweden) Angelica Wallén (2017–2020)
- (Sweden) Nathalie Hagman (2016–2017)
- (Sweden) Emelie Nykvist (2015–2020)
- (Japan) Ayaka Ikehara (2017–2020), (2023-2024)
- (Japan) Yui Sunami (2018–2019)
- (Japan) Sakura Hauge (2018–2019)
- (Netherlands) Dione Housheer (2018–2021)
- (Netherlands) Estavana Polman (2022)
- (Netherlands) Nikita van der Vliet (2020–2023)
- (Norway) Tiril Merg (2017–2018)
- (France) Marie Hélène Sajka (2022–2023)
- (France) Kalidiatou Niakaté (2024–2025)
- (Faroe Islands) Annika Fríðheim Petersen (2022-2023)

== Statistics ==
=== Top scorers in the EHF Champions League ===
Last updated on 14 November 2026

| Rank | Name | Seasons played | Goals |
|---|---|---|---|
| 1 | (Sweden) Johanna Westberg | 1 | 76 |
| 2 | (Denmark) Kristina Kristiansen | 3 | 72 |
| 3 | (Sweden) Clara Lerby | 1 | 59 |
| 4 | (Denmark) Sofie Bardrum | 1 | 57 |
| 5 | (Norway) Maja Magnussen | 2 | 54 |
| 6 | (Norway) Mona Obaidli | 2 | 53 |
| 7 | (Norway) Mia Svele | 1 | 51 |
| 8 | (Denmark) Alberte Kielstrup | 1 | 44 |
| 9 | (Norway) Caroline Aar Jakobsen | 2 | 40 |
| 10 | (Denmark) Lærke Nolsøe | 1 | 37 |

== European record ==
EHF Champions League

| Season | Competition | Round | Club | Home | Away | Aggregate |
|---|---|---|---|---|---|---|
| 2017–18 | EHF Champions League | Group A | (Romania) CSM București | 25–22 | 26–39 | 2nd place |
| 2017–18 | EHF Champions League | Group A | (Slovenia) RK Krim | 28–26 | 26–27 | 2nd place |
| 2017–18 | EHF Champions League | Group A | (Poland) Vistal Gdynia | 27–21 | 36–28 | 2nd place |
| 2017–18 | EHF Champions League | Main round (Group 1) | (Hungary) Győri ETO KC | 24–32 | 23–32 | 5th place |
| 2017–18 | EHF Champions League | Main round (Group 1) | (Denmark) FC Midtjylland Håndbold | 21–21 | 20–24 | 5th place |
| 2017–18 | EHF Champions League | Main round (Group 1) | (Russia) Rostov-Don | 25–29 | 22–32 | 5th place |
| 2024–25 | EHF Champions League | Group stage Group A | (France) Metz Handball | 27–28 | 22–30 | 8th place |
| 2024–25 | EHF Champions League | Group stage Group A | (Romania) CSM București | 27–29 | 26–27 | 8th place |
| 2024–25 | EHF Champions League | Group stage Group A | (Slovenia) RK Krim Mercator | 25–35 | 30–30 | 8th place |
| 2024–25 | EHF Champions League | Group stage Group A | (Norway) Storhamar HE | 28–33 | 22–22 | 8th place |
| 2024–25 | EHF Champions League | Group stage Group A | (Hungary) FTC-Rail Cargo Hungaria | 27–34 | 22–31 | 8th place |
| 2024–25 | EHF Champions League | Group stage Group A | (Croatia) HC Podravka Vegeta | 28–31 | 27–27 | 8th place |
| 2024–25 | EHF Champions League | Group stage Group A | (Romania) Gloria Bistrița-Năsăud | 29–37 | 32–24 | 8th place |

EHF European League

| Season | Competition | Round | Club | Home | Away | Aggregate |
|---|---|---|---|---|---|---|
| 2016–17 | EHF Cup | R1 | (Sweden) Lugi HF | 25–23 | 29–20 | 54–43 |
| 2016–17 | EHF Cup | R2 | (Poland) Pogoń Baltica Szczecin | 35–29 | 33–28 | 68–57 |
| 2016–17 | EHF Cup | R3 | (Italy) Indeco Conversano | 36–24 | 36–22 | 72–46 |
| 2016–17 | EHF Cup | Group D | (Germany) TuS Metzingen | 36–36 | 34–29 | 1st place |
| 2016–17 | EHF Cup | Group D | (Russia) HC Lada Togliatti | 35–23 | 32–35 | 1st place |
| 2016–17 | EHF Cup | Group D | (Norway) Glassverket IF | 32–32 | 25–25 | 1st place |
| 2016–17 | EHF Cup | 1/4 | (Denmark) Randers HK | 24–27 | 28–23 | 52–50 |
| 2016–17 | EHF Cup | 1/2 | (Germany) SG BBM Bietigheim | 27–38 | 32–28 | 59–66 |
| 2018–19 | EHF Cup | R2 | (Slovakia) IUVENTA Michalovce | 29–22 | 29–26 | 59–48 |
| 2018–19 | EHF Cup | R3 | (Sweden) H 65 Höör | 27–24 | 27–23 | 54–47 |
| 2018–19 | EHF Cup | Group D | (Croatia) Podravka Koprivnica | 24–28 | 28–25 | 2nd place |
| 2018–19 | EHF Cup | Group D | (Spain) Bera Bera | 31–26 | 36–28 | 2nd place |
| 2018–19 | EHF Cup | Group D | (Romania) SCM Craiova | 20–20 | 12–18 | 2nd place |
| 2018–19 | EHF Cup | 1/4 | (Denmark) Viborg HK | 20–28 | 19–24 | 39–52 |
| 2019–20 | EHF Cup | R3 | (Denmark) Herning-Ikast Håndbold | 23–23 | 26–31 | 49–54 |
| 2020–21 | EHF European Leaguge | R3 | (France) Paris 92 | 26–28 | 16–28 | 42–56 |
| 2022–23 | EHF European Leaguge | R2 | (Turkey) Yalikavksports Club | 37–24 | 29–21 | 66–45 |
| 2022–23 | EHF European Leaguge | R3 | (Denmark) Viborg HK | 34–21 | 30–30 | 64–51 |
| 2022–23 | EHF European Leaguge | Group C | (Hungary) DVSC Schaeffler | 34–22 | 27–28 | 1st place |
| 2022–23 | EHF European Leaguge | Group C | (Norway) Sola HK | 26–28 | 28–26 | 1st place |
| 2022–23 | EHF European Leaguge | Group C | (Croatia) Podravka Vegeta | 28–23 | 29–24 | 1st place |
| 2022–23 | EHF European Leaguge | QF | (Romania) SCM Râmnicu Vâlcea | 38–29 | 29–32 | 67–61 |
| 2022–23 | EHF European Leaguge | Semi-final (F4) | (Germany) Borussia Dortmund | 35–33 | | |
| 2022–23 | EHF European Leaguge | Final (F4) | (Denmark) Ikast Håndbold | 24–31 | | |
| 2023–24 | EHF European League | Group A | (Norway) Storhamar Håndball Elite | 26–27 | 26–27 | 3rd place |
| 2023–24 | EHF European League | Group A | (Croatia) RK Podravka Koprivnica | 23–22 | 23–25 | 3rd place |
| 2023–24 | EHF European League | Group A | (Hungary) Váci NKSE | 32–27 | 24–27 | 3rd place |
| 2025-26 | EHF European League | Group B | (Hungary) MOL Esztergomi | 34–32 | 25–30 | 2nd place |
| 2025-26 | EHF European League | Group B | (France) Chambray Touraine | 21–21 | 28–28 | 2nd place |
| 2025-26 | EHF European League | Group B | (Germany) HSG Blomberg-Lippe | 30–30 | 29–22 | 2nd place |
| 2025-26 | EHF European League | QF | (Germany) Thüringer HC | 27-31 | 37-36 | 64-67 |

== Stadium ==
- Name: Nykøbing F. Hallen (Sponsorname: Spar Nord BOXEN)
- City: Nykøbing Falster
- Capacity: 3.000
- Address: Nørre Boulevard 4 A, Nykøbing Falster
