= Anna Lagerquist =

Swedish handball player (born 1993)

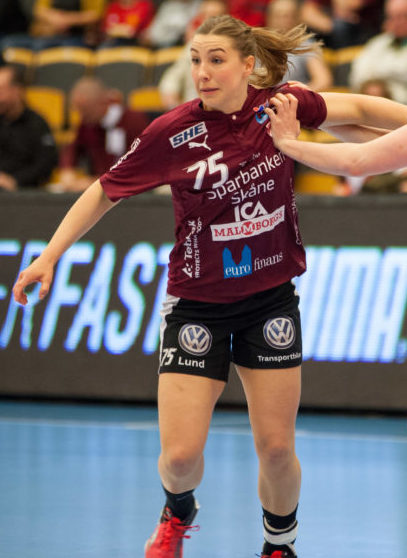

Personal information
- Nationality: Swedish
- Born: 16 October 1993 (age 33) Lund, Sweden
- Height: 1.75 m (5 ft 9 in)

Sport
- Sport: Handball
- Position: Pivot
- Current club: Győri ETO KC
- Number: 9

Senior clubs
- Years: Team
- 2009–2017: Lugi HF
- 2017–2020: Nykøbing Falster HK
- 2020–2022: Rostov-Don
- 2022–2024: Neptunes de Nantes
- 2024–2026: Győri ETO KC
National team
Years	Team	Apps	(Gls)
2016–2025	Sweden	121	(127)

Anna Lagerquist (born 16 October 1993) is a Swedish former handball player last playing for Győri ETO KC and the Swedish national team.

She was part of the Swedish team at the 2025 World Championship, but had to leave the tournament due to injury after the preliminary round.

== Achievements ==
- EHF Champions League:
  - Winner: 2025
- Russian Super League
  - Winner: 2022
- Russian Cup
  - Winner: 2021
- Danish Cup
  - Winner: 2018
- Nemzeti Bajnokság:
  - Winner: 2025
