= Dione Housheer =

Dutch handball player (born 1999)

Personal information
- Nationality: Dutch
- Born: 26 September 1999 (age 27) Gendringen, Netherlands
- Height: 1.80 m (5 ft 11 in)

Sport
- Sport: Handball
- Position: Right back
- Current club: Győri ETO KC
- Number: 48

Youth career
- Years: Team
- 2004–2012: UGHV
- 2012–2015: AAC 1899

Senior clubs
- Years: Team
- 2015–2016: HV Fortissimo
- 2016–2018: VOC Amsterdam
- 2018–2021: Nykøbing Falster
- 2021–2024: Odense Håndbold
- 2024–: Győri ETO KC
National team
Years	Team	Apps	(Gls)
2017–	Netherlands	128	(456)
Medal record
World Championship
Gold medal – first place	2019 Japan
European Championship
Bronze medal – third place	2018 France
- Updated on 9 April 2026

Dione Housheer (born 26 September 1999) is a Dutch female handballer for Győri ETO KC and the Dutch national team.

== Career ==
=== Club ===
Housheer started playing handball at the age of 5 at the Dutch club UGHV. In 2015/2016 she played a single season for HV Fortissimo before signing for VOC Amsterdam. Here she played from 2016 to 2018, where she won the Eresdivisie in both seasons as well as the Dutch Cup in 2018, before signing for Danish side Nykøbing Falster Håndboldklub on a 3-year deal. With Nykøbing Falster she won the Danish cup; the first of its kind for the club.

When her contract ran out she signed for league Rivals Odense Håndbold. With Odense she won the Danish League in 2021 and 2022. In the 2021-2022 she was selected for the league all-star team as the right back.

In 2024 she joined Hungarian Győri ETO KC from Odense together with fellow Dutch international Bo van Wetering. She won the 2024–25 Women's EHF Champions League and the Hungarian Championship in her first season with the team, and became a leader and top scorer of Győr with 226 goals (all competitions combined). Her original contract was for 3 years, ending in 2027, but in 2025 (after one season) she and the club came to an agreement regarding the prolongation of said contract, therefore she signed for 3 more years, extending until 2030.

=== National team ===
Housheer debuted for Dutch national team on October 28, 2017, in a match against Germany. Her first major international tournament was the 2018 European Championship where she won bronze medals with the Dutch team.

She represented the Netherlands at the 2019 World Women's Handball Championship, where the Netherlands surprised many to win the title, beating Spain 30:29 in the final. This was the first title in the country's history.

A year later at the 2020 European Championship she fisnished 6th with the Dutch team.

At the 2020 Olympics she also represented the Netherlands, where the Dutch team finished 5th.

At the 2023 World Championship she finished 5th with the Dutch team, scoring 31 goals.

At the 2025 World Championship, which was co-hosted by the Netherlands, she finished 4th with the Dutch team, scored 44 goals and made 41 assists, and was named the All-Star right back of the competition.

== Achievements ==
- EHF Champions League
  - Winner: 2025
  - runner-up: 2026
- Dutch National team - World champion 2019 - gold medal in Japan
- Dutch National team - European Championship 2018 - bronze medal in France
- Eredivisie:
  - Winner: 2017, 2018
- Beker van Nederland:
  - Winner: 2018
- Nederlandse Supercup:
  - Winner: 2016
- Danish Women's Handball League
  - Winner: 2021, 2022
  - runner-up: 2023
- Danish Santander Cup
  - Winner: 2018
  - Finalist: 2020, 2021, 2022, 2023
- Danish Super Cup
  - Winner : 2023, final game voted best player
  - Finalist: 2022 final game voted best player, 2021
- Nemzeti Bajnokság:
  - Winner: 2025, 2026

== Awards and recognition ==
- All-Star right back of the IHF World Handball Championship: 2025
- EHF Excellence Awards: Best Right Back of the Champions League. Season 2024/25, 2025/26
- MVP of the Youth European Open Championship: 2016
- Eredivisie Talent of the Year: 2017
- Eredivisie Player of the Year: 2018
- Best right back Danish Kvindeligaen 2021/22, 2022/23
- Best young player nomination in the 2021–22 Women's EHF Champions League
- Most assists in Danish Kvindeligean 2023/2024 167x, 2022/2023 137x, 2nd place 2021/2022 171 x
