= Frederikke Gulmark =

Danish handball player (born 1994)

Personal information
- Full name: Frederikke Gulmark
- Nationality: Danish
- Born: 16 July 1994 (age 32) Rudersdal Municipality, Denmark
- Height: 1.78 m (5 ft 10 in)

Sport
- Sport: Handball
- Position: Left Back
- Current club: Lyngby HK
- Number: 38

Senior clubs
- Years: Team
- –2016: Lyngby HK
- 2016–2018: Randers HK
- 2018: Lyngby HK
- 2018–2019: Gjerpen IF
- 2019–2023: HH Elite

Frederikke Gulmark (born 16 July 1994) is a Danish handball player, who until 2023 played for the Danish club HH Elite in the Danish 1st Division.

In her last season at HH Elite they secured promotion to the top league in Denmark while Frederikke Gulmark was playing on the last year of her contract. She decided not to extend the contract due to pregnancy leave.
