= Johanna Westberg =

Swedish handball player (born 1990)

Personal information
- Full name: Johanna Elizabeth Westberg
- Nationality: Swedish
- Born: 6 April 1990 (age 36) Nacka, Sweden
- Height: 1.86 m (6 ft 1 in)

Sport
- Sport: Handball
- Position: Left back

Senior clubs
- Years: Team
- 2007–2014: Skuru IK
- 2014–2016: Randers HK
- 2016–2022: Nykøbing HK
National team
Years	Team	Apps	(Gls)
2012–2021	Sweden	79	(154)

Johanna Westberg (born 6 April 1990) is a Swedish retired handball player, who last played for Nykøbing HK and the Swedish national team.

She's the twin sister of teammate Emelie Westberg. Her debut in the national team was 2012 against France. She played in the 2012 European Championship for Sweden. In 2017 she won the Danish championship with Nykøbing Falster Håndboldklub. This was the first time in club history.

== Achievements ==
- 2009 Gold with Skuru IK in Swedish youth championship.
- 2014 Final in the swedish championship with Skuru IK.
- Carpathian Trophy:
  - Winner: 2015
- 2017 Winner in Danish Championship with Nykøbing Falster Håndboldklub
