= Berit Kristensen =

Danish handball player (born 1983)

Personal information
- Full name: Berit Hudtloff Viinberg
- Nationality: Danish
- Born: 2 August 1983 (age 43) Sakskøbing, Denmark
- Height: 1.73 m (5 ft 8 in)

Sport
- Sport: Handball
- Position: Playmaker
- Current club: Retired

Youth career
- Years: Team
- –: Sakskøbing

Senior clubs
- Years: Team
- –: Nykøbing Falster Håndboldklub
- 2001–2004: Viborg HK
- 2004–2013: Randers HK
National team
Years	Team	Apps	(Gls)
2003–2012	Denmark	68	(88)

Berit Kristensen (born 2 August 1983) is a Danish former team handball player, who played for the club Randers HK and for the Danish women's national handball team.

At the 2010 European Women's Handball Championship she reached the bronze final and placed fourth with the Danish team.

She is married to the former handball player Jeppe Viinberg.
