= Emelie Nykvist =

Swedish handball player (born 1990)

Personal information
- Nationality: Swedish
- Born: 6 April 1990 (age 36) Nacka, Sweden
- Height: 1.78 m (5 ft 10 in)

Sport
- Sport: Handball
- Position: Left back
- Current club: Nykøbing Falster
- Number: 3

Senior clubs
- Years: Team
- 2007–2014: Skuru IK
- 2014–2015: Lugi HF
- 2015–2020: Nykøbing Falster
National team
Years	Team	Apps	(Gls)
–	Sweden	4	(1)

Emelie Nykvist (née Westberg; born 6 April 1990) is a Swedish former handball player, who last played for Nykøbing Falster Håndboldklub.

She played in the Swedish U-20 national team in 2010 and scored 11 goals in the tournament. She was raised in Skuru IK. There she played with her twin sister Johanna Westberg and Nathalie Hagman. She changed club from Skuru IK to Lugi HF 2014. After that year, Emelie became a professional in Denmark and Nykøbing Falster Håndboldklub. Here she was reunited with her sister Johanna Westberg and Nathalie Hagman 2016–2017 and together they won gold in the Danish championship that season. After five years in Nykøbing Falster Håndboldklub, she left the club in 2020 after giving birth to her first child.

Her twin sister is Johanna Westberg.
