= Angelica Wallén =

Swedish handball player (born 1986)

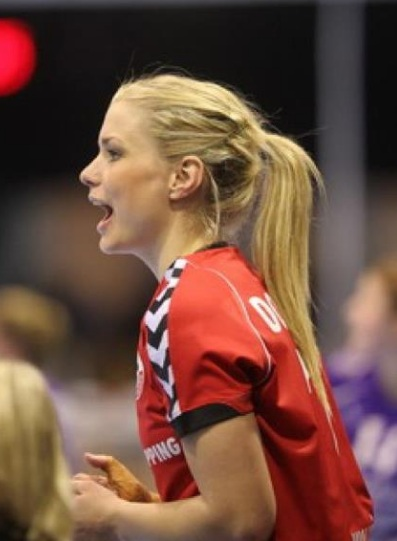

Personal information
- Nationality: Swedish
- Born: 11 April 1986 (age 40) Sundsvall, Sweden
- Height: 1.72 m (5 ft 8 in)

Sport
- Sport: Handball
- Position: Right back

Senior clubs
- Years: Team
- –2005: Tibro HK
- 2005–2010: Skövde HF
- 2010–2013: Team Esbjerg
- 2013–2015: Randers HK
- 2015–2016: Toulon Métropole Var Handball
- 2016–2017: Skuru IK
- 2017–2020: Nykøbing Falster HK
- 2020–2021: Odense Håndbold
- 2021–2022: IK Sävehof
National team
Years	Team	Apps	(Gls)
2009–2016	Sweden	78	(100)
Medal record
European Championship
Silver medal – second place	2010 Denmark/Norway

Angelica Wallén (born 11 April 1986) is a Swedish former handball player for the Swedish women's national handball team.

At the 2010 European Women's Handball Championship she reached the final and won a silver medal with the Swedish team.

She competed at the 2012 and 2016 Summer Olympics.

== Achievements ==
- Swedish Championship:
  - Winner: 2008, 2022
- Danish Championship:
  - Winner: 2021
- Danish Cup:
  - Winner: 2019, 2020
- Carpathian Trophy:
  - Winner: 2015
