= Ayaka Ikehara =

Japanese handball player (born 1990)

Personal information
- Nationality: Japanese
- Born: 24 September 1990 (age 36) Urasoe, Japan
- Height: 1.57 m (5 ft 2 in)

Sport
- Sport: Handball
- Position: Right wing
- Number: 21

Senior clubs
- Years: Team
- 2012–2017: MIE violet' IRIS
- 2017–2020: Nykøbing Falster
- 2020–2023: Odense Håndbold
- 2023–2024: Nykøbing Falster
National team
Years	Team	Apps	(Gls)
2012–2023	Japan	37	(95)
Medal record
Asian Championship
Silver medal – second place	2018 Japan

Ayaka Ikehara (born 24 September 1990) is a former Japanese handball player for the Japanese national team.

== Early life ==
Ikehara was born on 24 September 1990 in Urasoe, Okinawa Prefecture, Japan.

== Career ==
In 2013, Ikehara was selected for the Japan women's national team that took part in the 2013 World Women's Handball Championship in Serbia. Japan were eliminated in the round of 16 after losing 27–19 to France.

She was again selected for Japan at the 2015 World Women's Handball Championship in Denmark. Japan did not fare as well after being eliminated in the preliminary group stage. They participated in the President's Cup play-off, losing 29–24 to China before defeating Puerto Rico 44–15.

In 2017, she joined Nykøbing Falster in Denmark and began playing in the Damehåndboldligaen.

Ikehara was again part of the Japan squad at the 2017 World Women's Handball Championship in Germany. Japan finished third in their group after wins against Montenegro and Tunisia. In the round of 16, they faced the Netherlands and were eliminated after losing 26–24 after extra time.

The 2019 World Women's Handball Championship was held in Japan and Ikehara was again part of the squad. Japan fared well at the tournament as the host nation. In the preliminary round, they defeated Argentina, DR Congo and China which saw them qualify for the main round as the third-placed team in their group. However, they were eliminated in the main round after winning just one of their five group matches.

In 2020, Ikehara joined Odense Håndbold of Denmark. With Odense Håndbold, Ikehara twice won the Damehåndboldligaen in 2020–21 and 2021–22.

Ikehara made her Olympic debut at the delayed 2020 Summer Olympics in Tokyo, Japan. Despite a 29–26 victory against Montenegro, Japan were eliminated at the group stage.

In 2023, Ikehara returned to Nykøbing Falster and retired the following season.

== Achievements ==
- Danish League:
  - Gold Medalist: 2021, 2022
- Carpathian Trophy:
  - Bronze Medalist: 2019

== Individual awards ==
- All-Star Right Wing of Damehåndboldligaen: 2017/18
