= Mie Augustesen =

Danish handball player (born 1988)

Personal information
- Nationality: Danish
- Born: 19 July 1988 (age 38) Vejle, Denmark
- Height: 1.77 m (5 ft 10 in)

Sport
- Sport: Handball
- Position: Left wing
- Current club: FC Midtjylland Håndbold
- Number: 24

Senior clubs
- Years: Team
- 1994–2000: Daugård IF
- 2000–2004: Vejle/Bredballe
- 2004–2012: Randers HK
- 2012–2013: Thüringer HC
- 2013–2014: København Håndbold
- 2014–2019: Herning-Ikast Håndbold
National team
Years	Team	Apps	(Gls)
2007–2014	Denmark	80	(262)
Medal record
IHF Junior World Championship
Silver medal – second place	2008 Macedonia
IHF Youth World Championship
Gold medal – first place	2006 Canada
European Junior Championship
Gold medal – first place	2007 Turkey
European Youth Championship
Gold medal – first place	2005 Austria
- Updated on 22 January 2024

Mie Augustesen (born 19 July 1988, in Vejle) is a Danish former handball player. She played for Herning-Ikast Håndbold, København Håndbold and Randers HK in Denmark and Thüringer HC in Germany. She won the Danish Championship in 2015 with FC Midtjylland. She also featured in the Danish national team.

She debuted for the Danish national team in Oktober 2007. She competed at the 2010 European Women's Handball Championship, where the Danish team placed fourth, and Augustesen was voted into the All-Star Team. She had to exit before semi-final and was replaced by club colleague Gitte Aaen.
