= Cecilie Greve =

Danish handball player (born 1992)

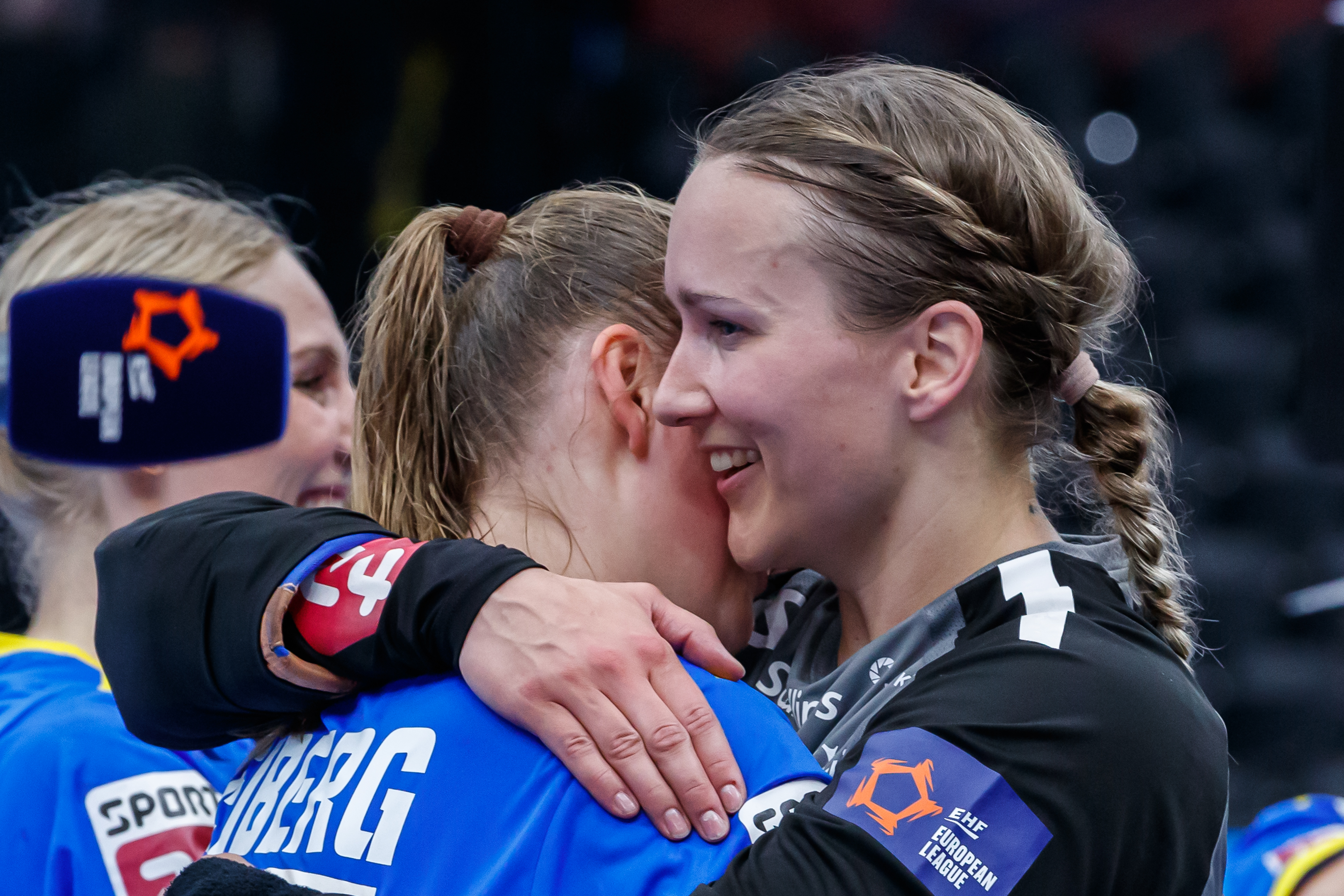

Personal information
- Nationality: Danish
- Born: 19 January 1992 (age 34) Roskilde, Denmark
- Height: 1.87 m (6 ft 2 in)

Sport
- Sport: Handball
- Position: Goalkeeper

Senior clubs
- Years: Team
- –: Quick 70
- –: Roskilde Håndbold
- 2010–2015: HC Odense
- 2015–2017: Randers HK
- 2017–2026: NFH
National team
Years	Team	Apps	(Gls)
2012–2026	Denmark	39	(0)
Medal record
World Championship
Bronze medal – third place	2013 Serbia	Team
European Junior Championship
Gold medal – first place	2011 Netherlands
European Youth Championship
Gold medal – first place	2009 Serbia

Cecilie Greve (born 19 January 1992) is a former Danish handball player for Nykøbing Falster Håndboldklub and the Danish national team. She has won the Danish cup twice, once with Randers HK and once with NFH. When she won it with NFH, she was named MVP in the tournament.

At the 2013 World Championship, she was a part of the Danish team that won bronze medals, breaking a 9-year streak without medals for the Danish team. They beat Poland 30–26.
