= Yui Sunami =

Japanese handball player (born 1991)

Personal information
- Nationality: Japanese
- Born: 7 June 1991 (age 35) Okayama, Japan
- Height: 1.62 m (5 ft 4 in)

Sport
- Sport: Handball
- Position: Right back
- Current club: Hokkoku Bank
- Number: 4

Senior clubs
- Years: Team
- 2015–2018: Hokkoku Bank
- 2018–2019: Nykøbing Falster Håndboldklub
- 2019–: Hokkoku Bank
National team
Years	Team	Apps	(Gls)
–	Japan	57	(155)
Medal record
Asian Championship
Silver medal – second place	2018 Japan

Yui Sunami (角南 唯, Sunami Yui; born 7 June 1991) is a Japanese handball player for Hokkoku Bank and the Japanese national team.

She competed at the 2015 World Women's Handball Championship in Denmark and the 2017 World Women's Handball Championship in Germany.
