= Matilde Kondrup Nielsen =

Danish handball player (born 1995)

Personal information
- Full name: Matilde Kondrup Nielsen
- Nationality: Danish
- Born: 9 February 1995 (age 31) Farsø, Denmark
- Height: 1.82 m (6 ft 0 in)

Sport
- Sport: Handball
- Position: Left wing
- Current club: Ikast Håndbold
- Number: 2

Youth career
- Years: Team
- 1999-2010: I.K. Vest
- 2010-2013: Aalborg DH

Senior clubs
- Years: Team
- 2013-2014: Skive fH
- 2014-2017: Odense Håndbold
- 2017-2020: Nykøbing Falster
- 2020-2024: Ajax København
- 2024-: Ikast Håndbold

Matilde Kondrup Nielsen (born 9 February 1995) is a Danish handball player for Ikast Håndbold in the Danish Women's Handball League.

She started playing handball at the age of 4 at I.K Vest, before switching to Aalborg DH at the age of 16.
