= Tiril Merg =

Norwegian handball player (born 1993)

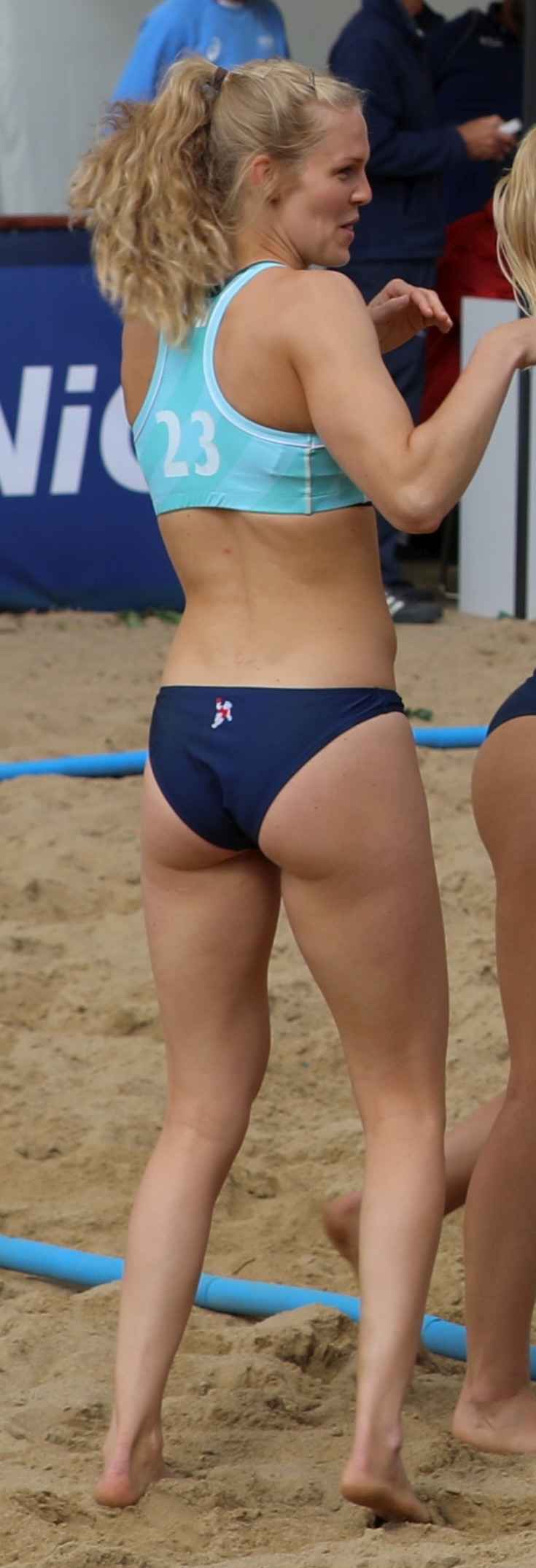

Personal information
- Full name: Tiril Gunther Merg
- Nationality: Norwegian
- Born: 2 September 1993 (age 33) Bærum, Norway
- Height: 1.81 m (5 ft 11 in)

Sport
- Sport: Handball
- Position: Left back
- Current club: Larvik HK
- Number: 8

Senior clubs
- Years: Team
- 2010-2012: Stabæk IF
- 2012-2017: Glassverket IF
- 2017-2018: Nykøbing Falster Håndboldklub
- 2018-2019: Skrim Kongsberg
- 2019-: Larvik HK

Tiril Gunther Merg (born 2 September 1993) is a Norwegian handball player for Larvik HK.
