= 2016–17 Damehåndboldligaen =

Damehåndboldligaen
- Season: 2016–17
- Champions: Nykøbing Falster Håndboldklub (1st title)
- Relegated: Skanderborg Håndbold
- Champions League: FC Midtjylland Håndbold; Nykøbing Falster Håndboldklub
- EHF Cup: København Håndbold; Viborg HK; Silkeborg-Voel KFUM
- Matches: 136
- Goals: 7,178 (52.78 per match)
- Top goalscorer: (Denmark) Trine Troelsen (199 goals)
- Biggest home win: KBH 35-21 SKA; FCM 30-18 TTH
- Biggest away win: RIN 18-33 FCM
- Highest scoring: NFH 29-35 ESB; NFH 36-28 AAR

The 2016–17 Damehåndboldligaen (known as the Primo Tours Ligaen for sponsorship reasons) was the 81st season of the Damehåndboldligaen, Denmark's premier handball league. Team Esbjerg were the defending champions.

Nykøbing Falster Håndboldklub won their first title ever, when they beat København Håndbold in the final 27-25. Skanderborg Håndbold were relegated, as they finished last in the regular season.

This was the first time in 10 years, that a team from outside Jutland won the title.

After the season SK Aarhus went bankrupt, and they did therefore not compete in the following season. Aarhus United took over their license, and could thus play their first season in the league.

== Team information ==
Locations of the 2017–18 Primo Tour Ligaen

Team.	Town	Arena	Capacity
FC Midtjylland	Ikast	Ikast-Brande Arena	2.850
HC Odense	Odense	Odense Idrætshal	2.256
København Håndbold	København	Frederiksberghallen	1.468
Nykøbing Falster	Nykøbing Falster	Scandlines Arena	1.300
Randers HK	Randers	Arena Randers	3.000
Ringkøbing Håndbold	Ringkøbing	Rofi-Centret	1.100
Silkeborg-Voel KFUM	Silkeborg	Jysk Arena	3.000
SK Aarhus	Aarhus	Viljen Til Sejr Arena	1.152
Skanderborg Håndbold	Skanderborg	Fælledhallen	1.700
Team Esbjerg	Esbjerg	Blue Water Dokken	2.549
Team Tvis Holstebro	Holstebro	Gråkjær Arena	3.250
Viborg HK	Viborg	Viborg Stadionhal	3.000

== The regular season ==
=== Standings ===
Pos	Team	Pld	W	D	L	GF	GA	GD	Pts	Qualification or relegation
1	FC Midtjylland	22	19	1	2	619	510	+109	39	Semifinal
2	Nykøbing Falster	22	14	2	6	657	587	+70	30	Semifinal
3	Viborg HK	22	14	1	7	584	554	+30	29	Quarterfinal
4	København Håndbold	22	13	2	7	642	563	+79	28	Quarterfinal
5	Silkeborg-Voel KFUM	22	13	1	8	620	572	+48	27	Quarterfinal
6	Odense Håndbold	22	13	0	9	558	554	+4	26	Quarterfinal
7	Team Esbjerg	22	11	2	9	603	572	+31	24	
8	Randers HK	22	9	2	11	551	584	−33	20	
9	SK Aarhus	22	8	1	13	552	595	−43	17	
10	Team Tvis Holstebro	22	4	2	16	565	629	−64	10	Relegation Round
11	Ringkøbing Håndbold	22	3	3	16	522	624	−102	9	Relegation Round
12	Skanderborg Håndbold	22	1	3	18	505	634	−129	5	Relegation

Updated to match(es) played on 30 March 2017. Source:
Rules for classification: 1) points; 2) Goal difference; 3) Goals scored.

=== Results ===
Home \ Away	FCM	HCO	KBH	NFH	RAN	RIN	SIL	AAR	SKA	ESB	TTH	VHK
FC Midtjylland		30–24	28–26	23–31	34–22	32–22	33–28	29–20	34–20	27–25	30–18	26–25
HC Odense	23–28		29–23	27–21	21–22	33–30	18–28	31–29	26–22	22–21	26–23	26–20
København Håndbold	25–27	32–28		30–30	33–22	35–23	34–28	30–21	35–21	31–24	28–22	33–29
Nykøbing Falster	22–23	27–22	32–26		32–25	35–28	33–28	36–28	28–26	29–35	33–21	33–23
Randers HK	16–21	22–24	27–27	28–28		20–19	24–34	26–21	34–21	27–30	31–22	22–28
Ringkøbing Håndbold	18–33	21–34	20–33	33–28	25–27		27–23	23–26	24–24	24–30	27–25	25–25
Silkeborg-Voel	19–26	27–20	32–28	29–27	36–25	31–25		22–27	28–20	22–22	34–30	35–26
SK Aarhus	27–33	28–29	32–25	25–30	21–25	21–21	26–25		27–20	22–27	24–23	22–30
Skanderborg Håndbold	22–27	19–21	22–27	24–32	24–29	21–20	22–30	24–26		27–34	25–37	22–25
Team Esbjerg	23–26	26–21	23–22	25–28	28–32	30–19	38–31	32–29	27–27		31–25	27–30
Team Tvis Holstebro	30–30	23–26	26–30	27–29	29–24	28–27	25–28	25–29	27–27	26–32		18–24
Viborg HK	24–19	32–27	17–29	31–23	25–21	30–21	26–21	27–16	26–25	25–23	34–35	

Legend: Blue = home team win; Yellow = draw; Red = away team win.

== Championship playoffs ==
! Best of three matches. In the case of a tie after the second match, a third match is played. Highest ranking team in the regular season has the home advantage in the first and possible third match.

=== Quarterfinal ===
Date			Home team in the 1st match & 3rd match	Home team in the 2nd match	Results		
1st match	2nd match	3rd match	Home team in the 1st match & 3rd match	Home team in the 2nd match	1st match	2nd match	3rd match
5 April	12 April	20 April	Viborg HK	Odense Håndbold	26–28	22–20	21–20
4 April	12 April	19 April	København Håndbold	Silkeborg-Voel KFUM	23–29	29–25	31–23

=== Semifinal ===
Date			Home team in the 1st match & 3rd match	Home team in the 2nd match	Results		
1st match	2nd match	3rd match	Home team in the 1st match & 3rd match	Home team in the 2nd match	1st match	2nd match	3rd match
24 April	29 April	–	FC Midtjylland Håndbold	København Håndbold	20–21	23–29	–
25 April	30 April	–	Nykøbing Falster Håndboldklub	Viborg HK	26–24	27–27	–

=== Bronze Match ===
Date			Home team in the 1st match & 3rd match	Home team in the 2nd match	Results		
1st match	2nd match	3rd match	Home team in the 1st match & 3rd match	Home team in the 2nd match	1st match	2nd match	3rd match
9 May	14 May	17 May	FC Midtjylland Håndbold	Viborg HK	30–25	22–30	–

=== Final ===
Date			Home team in the 1st match & 3rd match	Home team in the 2nd match	Results		
1st match	2nd match	3rd match	Home team in the 1st match & 3rd match	Home team in the 2nd match	1st match	2nd match	3rd match
13 May	20 May	27 May	Nykøbing Falster Håndboldklub	København Håndbold	26–29	26–29	27–25

== Relegation playoff ==
! Best of three matches. In the case of a tie after the second match, a third match is played. Highest ranking team in the regular season has the home advantage in the first and possible third match.

=== Group 1 ===
Date			Home team in the 1st match & 3rd match	Home team in the 2nd match	Results		
1st match	2nd match	3rd match	Home team in the 1st match & 3rd match	Home team in the 2nd match	1st match	2nd match	3rd match
12 April	18 April	21 April	Ringkøbing Håndbold	Hadsten Sports Klub Håndbold	20–20	28–18	–

=== Group 2 ===
Date			Home team in the 1st match & 3rd match	Home team in the 2nd match	Results		
1st match	2nd match	3rd match	Home team in the 1st match & 3rd match	Home team in the 2nd match	1st match	2nd match	3rd match
15 April	20 April	23 April	TTH Holstebro	SønderjyskE Damer	28–23	27–23	–

== Top goalscorers ==
As of matches played on 27 May 2017

=== Regular season ===
Rank	Player	Club	Goals
1	(Denmark) Trine Troelsen	Silkeborg-Voel KFUM	180
2	(Sweden) Nathalie Hagman	Nykøbing Falster Håndboldklub	147
3	(Denmark) Stine Jørgensen	FC Midtjylland Håndbold	132
4	(Denmark) Ann Grete Nørgaard	Viborg HK	124
5	(Denmark) Kristina Jørgensen	Skanderborg Håndbold	114
5	(Netherlands) Laura van der Heijden	Team Esbjerg	114
7	(Denmark) Mia Rej	København Håndbold	113
8	(Norway) Stine Skogrand	Silkeborg-Voel KFUM	112
9	(Denmark) Line Haugsted	Viborg HK	111
10	(Denmark) Anna Sophie Okkels	SK Aarhus	110

=== Overall ===
Rank	Player	Club	Goals
1	(Denmark) Trine Troelsen	Silkeborg-Voel KFUM	199
2	(Sweden) Nathalie Hagman	Nykøbing Falster Håndboldklub	186
3	(Denmark) Stine Jørgensen	FC Midtjylland Håndbold	159
4	(Denmark) Ann Grete Nørgaard	Viborg HK	155
5	(Denmark) Mia Rej	København Håndbold	154
6	(Denmark) Line Haugsted	Viborg HK	151
7	(Denmark) Anne Mette Hansen	København Håndbold	132
8	(Norway) Stine Skogrand	Silkeborg-Voel KFUM	130
9	(Denmark) Kristina Kristiansen	Nykøbing Falster Håndboldklub	124
10	(Norway) Veronica Kristiansen	FC Midtjylland Håndbold	123

== All Star Team ==
- Goalkeeper: (Germany) Sabine Englert (FCM)
- Left Wing: (Denmark) Ann Grete Nørgaard (VHK)
- Left Back: (Denmark) Trine Troelsen (SIL)
- Centre Back: (Denmark) Mia Rej (KBH)
- Pivot: (Denmark) Mette Gravholt (NFH)
- Right Back: (Sweden) Nathalie Hagman (NFH)
- Right Wing: (Brazil) Jéssica Quintino (HCO)

=== Coach of the season ===
(Denmark) Claus Mogensen - København Håndbold
