= Isabella Jacobsen =

Danish handball player (born 1997)

Personal information
- Full name: Isabella Fazekas Jacobsen
- Nationality: Danish
- Born: 24 December 1997 (age 28) Copenhagen, Denmark
- Height: 1.82 m (6 ft 0 in)

Sport
- Sport: Handball
- Position: Left back
- Number: 14

Youth career
- Years: Team
- –: Jersie HK
- 2013–2015: Ajax København

Senior clubs
- Years: Team
- 2015–2018: Ajax København
- 2018–2020: Nykøbing Falster
- 2020–2022: Holstebro Håndbold
- 2022–2023: Romerike Ravens
- 2023–2024: Aarhus United

Isabella Fazekas Jacobsen (born 24 December 1997) is a Danish handball player for who last played for Aarhus United. She has also played for Holstebro Håndbold, Ajax København and Nykøbing Falster Håndboldklub in Denmark and Romerike Ravens in Norway.
