= Mathilde Neesgaard =

Danish handball player (born 1993)

Mathilde Neesgaard Mogensen
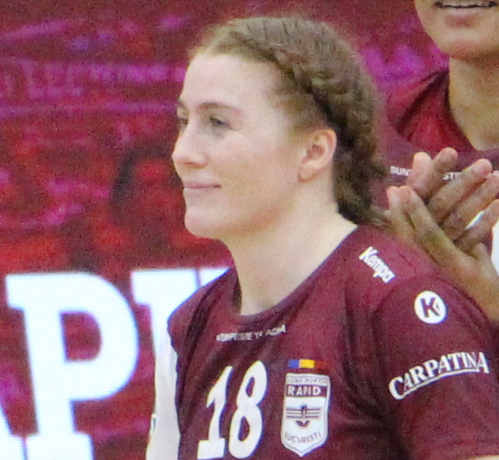

Personal information
- Nationality: Danish
- Born: 2 April 1993 (age 33) Herning, Denmark
- Height: 1.70 m (5 ft 7 in)

Sport
- Sport: Handball
- Position: Centre Back
- Current club: Horsens HK
- Number: 8

Senior clubs
- Years: Team
- 2011–2013: FC Midtjylland
- 2013–2016: Ringkøbing Håndbold
- 2016–2019: Team Tvis Holstebro
- 2019–2023: Aarhus United
- 2023–2024: CS Rapid București
- 2024–: HH Elite
National team
Years	Team	Apps	(Gls)
2023–	Denmark	3	(0)
Medal record
Women's handball
Representing Denmark
European Youth Championship
Gold medal – first place	2009 Serbia
- Updated on 5 March 2026

Mathilde Neesgaard Mogensen (born 2 April 1993) is a Danish handball player who currently plays for the Danish club Horsens HK.

In December 2021 Neesgaard signed a 3-year deal to extend for contract at Aarhus United until 2025. In the 2021–22 season while playing for Aarhus United she was the topscorer in the Danish league ordinary season with 179 goals. The same season she was in the league all star team.

In 2023 she joined Romanian top club CS Rapid București, where she played for a single season. She then signed a three-year deal with HH Elite.

At the age of 30 she made her debut on the Danish national team on 5 April 2023, against Sweden.
