= Kristina Kristiansen =

Danish handball player (born 1989)

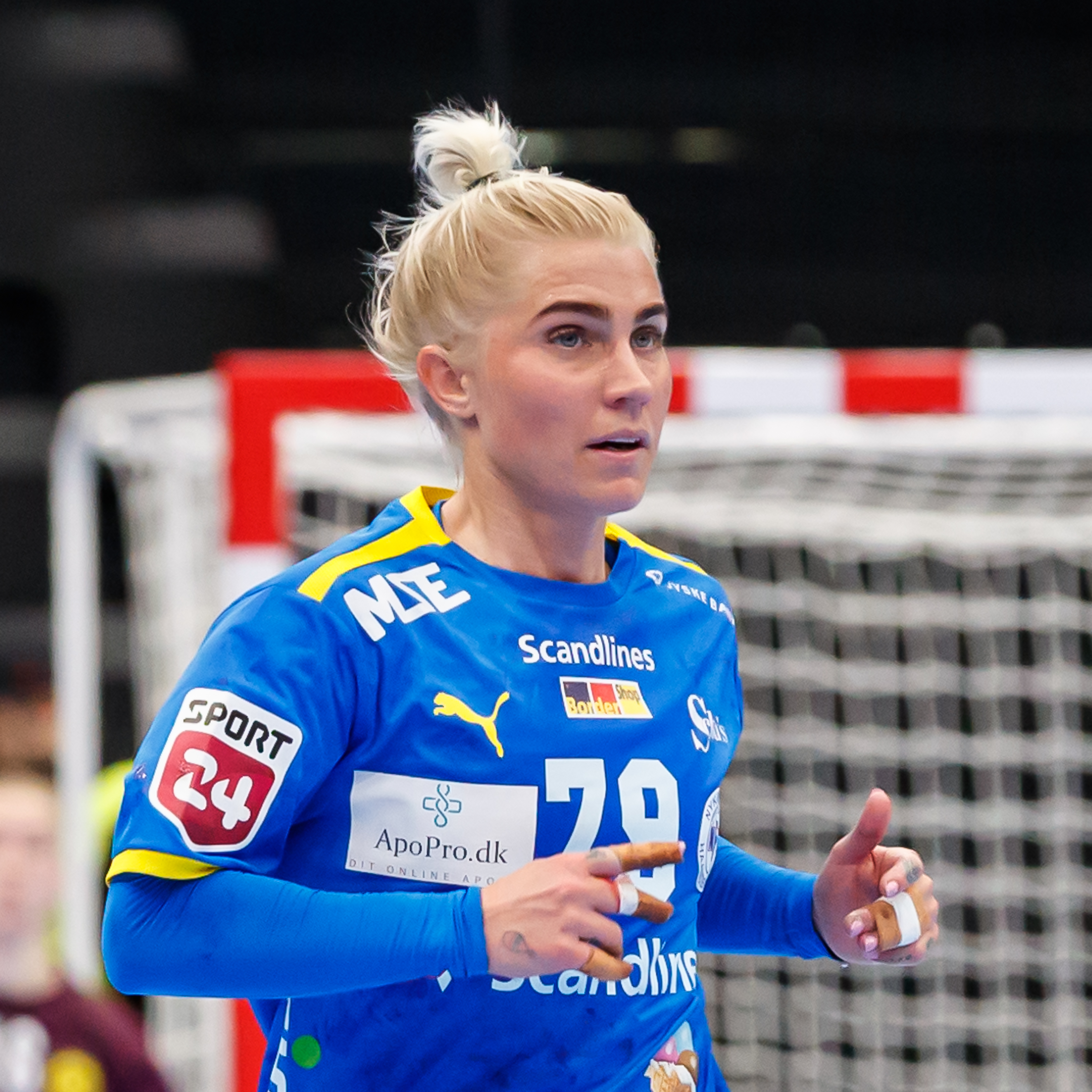
- Kristina Kristiansen in 2023

Personal information
- Full name: Kristina Kristiansen
- Nationality: Danish
- Born: 13 July 1989 (age 37) Taastrup, Høje-Taastrup Municipality, Denmark
- Height: 1.63 m (5 ft 4 in)

Sport
- Sport: Handball
- Position: Centre back
- Current club: Nykøbing Falster Håndboldklub
- Number: 79

Youth career
- Years: Team
- 1994–2006: Roar Roskilde

Senior clubs
- Years: Team
- 2006–2007: Roar Roskilde
- 2007–2015: TTH Holstebro
- 2015–: NFH
National team
Years	Team	Apps	(Gls)
2007–2017	Denmark	155	(378)
Medal record
World Championship
Bronze medal – third place	2013 Serbia
IHF Junior World Championship
Silver medal – second place	2008 Macedonia
IHF Youth World Championship
Gold medal – first place	2006 Canada
European Junior Championship
Gold medal – first place	2007 Turkey
European Youth Championship
Gold medal – first place	2005 Austria

Kristina "Mulle" Kristiansen (born 13 July 1989) is a Danish handball player for Nykøbing Falster Håndboldklub and the Danish national team. She is the club captain and club legend.

At the 2013 World Championship, she was a part of the Danish team that won bronze medals, breaking a 9-year streak without medals for the Danish team. They beat Poland 30–26.

In March 2015 it was announced that she joined Nykøbing Falster Håndboldklub from the 2016-17 season. This signaled that the team, which had just been promoted two year prior and barely survived relegation, would ramp up investment. The move sparked public interest in the, at the time, relatively obscure team. The following season they had the highest viewership numbers in the Danish handball league, men's or women's. In 2017 she won the Danish championship with the club, the first in club history.

== Private life ==
Kristiansen is openly lesbian. She has a child with her partner, Louise Vejsager, from June 2020.

== International honours ==
- Danish Championship:
  - Winner: 2017
  - Runner-up: 2013
- EHF Cup:
  - Winner: 2013
  - Runner-up: 2011
- World Championship:
  - Bronze Medalist: 2013
- World Youth Championship:
  - Gold Medalist: 2006

== Individual awards ==
- Danish League Top Scorer: 2010, 2016
- Danish League Best Centre Back: 2016
- All-Star Playmaker of the European Championship: 2014
