= Lærke Nolsøe =

Danish handball player (born 1996)

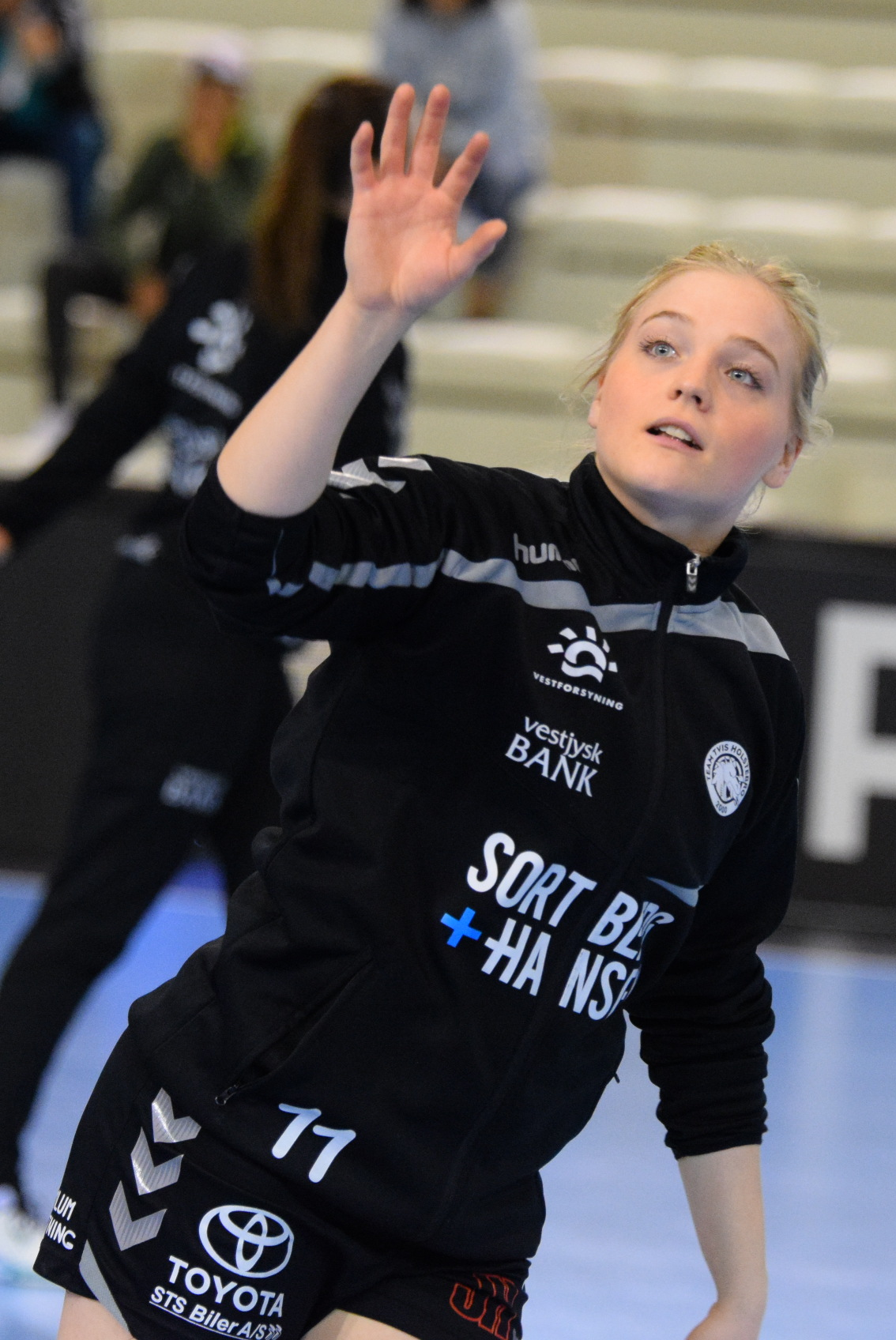
- Nolsøe in 2016

Personal information
- Full name: Lærke Nolsøe Pedersen
- Nationality: Danish
- Born: 19 February 1996 (age 30) Aalborg, Denmark
- Height: 1.69 m (5 ft 7 in)

Sport
- Sport: Handball
- Position: Left wing
- Current club: Ikast Håndbold
- Number: 22

Youth career
- Years: Team
- 2012–2013: TTH Holstebro

Senior clubs
- Years: Team
- 2013–2016: TTH Holstebro
- 2016–2021: Nykøbing Falster Håndboldklub
- 2021–2023: Viborg HK
- 2023–2024: Nykøbing Falster Håndboldklub
- 2024-: Ikast Håndbold
National team
Years	Team	Apps	(Gls)
2015–	Denmark	63	(135)
Medal record
World Championship
Bronze medal – third place	2021 Spain
Junior World Championship
Gold medal – first place	2016 Russia
Youth World Championship
Bronze medal – third place	2014 Macedonia
Junior European Championship
Gold medal – first place	2015 Spain
Youth European Championship
Bronze medal – third place	2013 Poland
- Updated on 4 September 2024

Lærke Nolsøe Pedersen (born 19 February 1996) is a Danish handball player for Nykøbing Falster Håndboldklub and the Danish national team.

== Club career ==
Nolsøe started her career at TTH Holstebro, before switching to Nykøbing Falster Håndboldklub in 2016. It was the move of former TTH coach Niels Agesen that motivated her move to the South Danish club. With NFH she won the Danish Championship in her first season. This was the first national championship in club history.

In 2021 she switched to Viborg HK, where she won silver medals in the EHF European League in her first season. In August 2022 she took a break from handball due to pregnancy leave. She returned in April 2023.

I 2023 she returned to NFH, where she played for a season, before joining Ikast Håndbold.

== National team ==
She debuted for the Danish National team on 8 October 2015 against Norway.

She represented Denmark at the 2019 World Women's Handball Championship in Japan and the 2021 World Women's Handball Championship in Spain. In the latter she won a bronze medal with the Denmark team.

== International honours ==
- EHF Cup Winners' Cup:
  - Winner: 2016
- EHF Cup:
  - Winner: 2015

== Individual awards ==
- All-Star Left Wing of the IHF Junior World Championship: 2016
- All-Star Left Wing of the Danish League: 2018/19, 2020/2021
