= Line Skak =

Danish handball player (born 1997)

Line Skak Lindegaard Nielsen
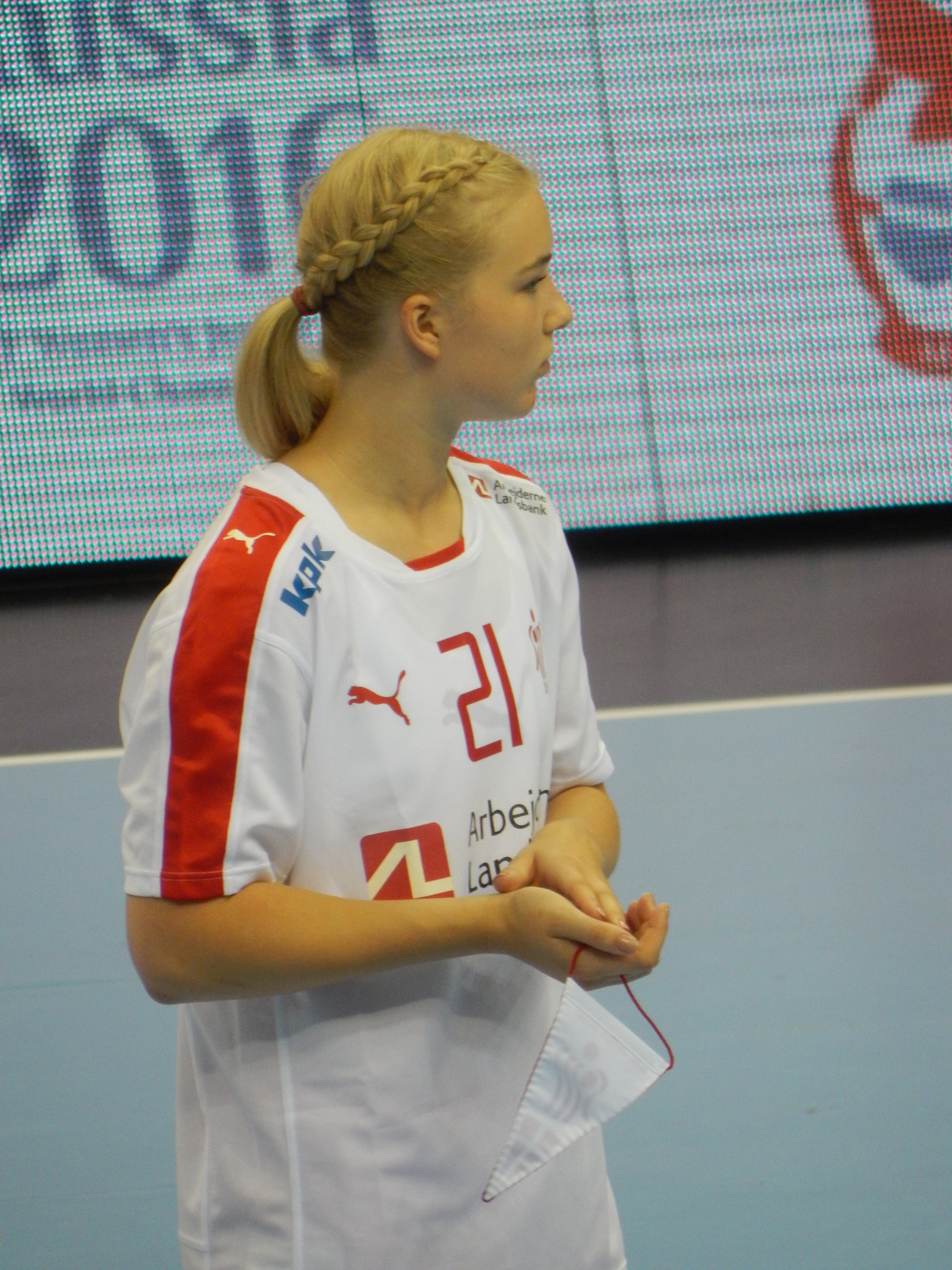

Personal information
- Full name: Line Skak Lindegaard Nielsen
- Nationality: Danish
- Born: 6 April 1997 (age 29) Ikast, Denmark
- Height: 1.86 m (6 ft 1 in)

Sport
- Sport: Handball
- Position: Line player
- Current club: Silkeborg-Voel KFUM
- Number: 97

Youth career
- Years: Team
- 2013–2016: FCM Håndbold

Senior clubs
- Years: Team
- 2015–2016: FCM Håndbold
- 2016–2018: TTH Holstebro
- 2018–2019: NFH
- 2019–2020: HH Elite
- 2020–: Silkeborg-Voel KFUM
Medal record
IHF Junior World Championship
| Gold medal – first place | 2016 Russia |
IHF Youth World Championship
| Bronze medal – third place | 2014 Macedonia |
European Junior Championship
| Gold medal – first place | 2015 Spain |
European Youth Championship
| Bronze medal – third place | 2013 Poland |

Line Skak Lindegaard Nielsen (born 6 April 1997) is a Danish handball player who currently plays for Silkeborg-Voel KFUM. In 2015 she won the Danish Championship with FC Midtjylland Håndbold, beating Team Esbjerg in the final.
