= Randers HK =

Danish handball club

- Full name: Randers Håndbold Klub A/S
- Short name: RHK
- Founded: 1996; 30 years ago
- Arena: Arena Randers
- Capacity: 2,500
- Head coach: Simon Olsen
- League: Danish 1st Division
- 2023–24: 1st (promotion)
- Club colours
Home	Away

Location of Randers HK

Randers HK is a women's handball club based in Randers, Denmark. They competes in the Danish 1st Division for the 2024/25 season and plays their home matches in Arena Randers.

== History ==
Randers HK was founded in 1996 as a collaborative effort between several smaller clubs from the Randers Municipality to create a handball team that could represent the region at the top level.

In 2000, they reached the final of the Women's EHF Challenge Cup. In 2002 they won their first medal in domestic championship; a bronze medal finishing third.

The season 2009/2010 was the greatest in the history of the club, Randers HK finishing runner-up in the domestic championship GuldBageren Ligaen and winning the Women's EHF Cup. In 2011/2012, they finally won the Danish Championship. In 2016, they lifted the Danish Cup.

In November 2022, the club decided to declare itself bankrupt after failing to raise over DKK 5 million. The club was then withdrawn from the league with immediate effect. However, the club managed to restart in the 2nd division. For the 2024/25 season, the club played in the 1st Division, but they were relegated immediately the season after.

== Results ==
- EHF Cup
  - Winners (1): 2010
- EHF Challenge Cup
  - Runners-Up (1): 2000
- Danish Championship
  - Winners (1): 2012
  - Runners-Up (2): 2010, 2011
  - Bronze medalist (2): 2002, 2014
- Danish Cup
  - Winners (1): 2016
- Danish Super Cup
  - Winner: 2012

== Team ==
=== Current squad ===
Squad for the 2024–25 season

Goalkeepers

- 1 (Netherlands) Jesse van de Polder
- 16 (Denmark) Caroline Grønkjær Madsen

Wingers
LW

- 7 (Denmark) Sille Trankjær Jacobsen
- 18 (Denmark) Annesofie Grønning

RW

- 23 (Denmark) Tania Knudsen

Pivots

- 6 (Denmark) Freya Vesterskov Sørensen
- 11 (Denmark) Mie Guldager

Back players
LB

- 19 (Denmark) Camilla Markussen
- 20 (Denmark) Nicoline Holden
- 63 (Denmark) Frida Møller

CB

- 2 (Denmark) Anna Gardum
- 5 (Denmark) Cecilie Kjær Lindgaard
- 10 (Denmark) Emma Grand Riiser
- 24 (Denmark) Rikke Thorngaard

RB

- 8 (Faroe Islands) Bjørk Franksdóttir Joensen

=== Technical staff ===
- Head coach: Simon Olsen
- Assistant coach: Stine Baun Eriksen
- Goalkeeping coach: Niels Guldborg

== Kits ==
AWAY
2016–17	2017–18	Craft; 2018–19

== Notable players ==
- (Denmark) Lotte Kiærskou
- (Denmark) Camilla Dalby
- (Denmark) Gitte Andersen
- (Denmark) Mie Augustesen
- (Denmark) Melanie Bak
- (Denmark) Stephanie Andersen
- (Denmark) Simone Böhme
- (Denmark) Katrine Fruelund
- (Denmark) Cecilie Greve
- (Denmark) Kathrine Heindahl
- (Denmark) Heidi Johansen
- (Denmark) Mie Højlund
- (Denmark) Berit Kristensen
- (Denmark) Christina Krogshede
- (Denmark) Mette Melgaard
- (Denmark) Merete Møller
- (Denmark) Anna Sophie Okkels
- (Denmark) Ann Grete Nørgaard
- (Denmark) Jane Schumacher
- (Denmark) Sille Thomsen
- (Denmark) Gitte Aaen
- (Denmark) Frederikke Gulmark
- (Denmark) Lærke Christensen
- (Montenegro) Ilda Kepić
- (Norway) Cecilie Thorsteinsen
- (Norway) Terese Pedersen
- (Norway) Martine Moen
- (Norway) Linn Gossé
- (Norway) Mari Molid
- (Norway) Eli Marie Raasok
- (Sweden) Angelica Wallén
- (Sweden) Johanna Westberg
- (Sweden) Ulrika Toft Hansen
- (Sweden) Sabina Jacobsen
- (Sweden) Sara Johansson
- (Sweden) Daniela Gustin
- (Sweden) Clara Monti Danielsson
- (Spain) Macarena Aguilar
- (Spain) Verónica Cuadrado
- (Germany) Nina Müller
- (Germany) Angie Geschke
- (Germany) Stefanie Melbeck
- (Germany) Susann Müller
- (Serbia) Jelena Erić
- (Serbia) Jovana Risović
- (Serbia) Tanja Milanović
- (Serbia) Ana Vojčić
- (China) Chao Zhai
- (Brazil) Chana Masson
- (Romania) Carmen Amariei
- (Romania) Mihaela Ani-Senocico
- (France) Stéphanie Moreau
- (France) Siraba Dembélé
- (Hungary) Bernadett Bódi
- (Hungary) Szabina Tápai
- (Hungary) Anikó Kántor
- (Netherlands) Natasja Burgers

== Head coach history ==
(Denmark)	Morten Arvidsson	1998–2004
(Norway)	Kjersti Grini	2004
(Denmark)	Heine Eriksen	2005–2006
(Denmark)	Martin Albertsen	2006–2009
(Denmark)	Jan Leslie	2009–2014
(Denmark)	Ryan Zinglersen	2015–2017
(Denmark)	Niels Agesen	2017–2021
(Denmark)	Ole Bitsch	2021–2023
(Denmark)	Simon Olsen	2023–

=== Top scorers in the EHF Champions League ===
(All-Time) – Last updated on 2 October 2021

Rank	Name	Seasons played	Goals
1	(Denmark) Camilla Dalby	3	128
2	(Denmark) Gitte Andersen	3	52
3	(Sweden) Sabina Jacobsen	1	48
4	(Germany) Nina Müller	2	45
5	(Sweden) Ulrika Toft Hansen	1	41
5	(France) Siraba Dembélé Pavlović	1	41
7	(Denmark) Katrine Fruelund	2	36
8	(Spain) Macarena Aguilar	1	26
9	(Denmark) Sofie Strangholt	3	24
9	(Germany) Susann Müller	1	24

== Stadium ==
- Name: Arena Randers
- City: Randers
- Capacity: 2,500 spectators
- Address: Fyensgade 1, 8900 Randers C
