= Seglem =

Seglem is a surname. Notable people with the surname include:

- Karl Seglem (born 1961), Norwegian musician, composer and producer
- Siri Seglem (born 1983), Norwegian handball player
