= Stine Andersen =

Stine Andersen may refer to:

- Stine Andersen (sport shooter) (born 1985), Danish sport shooter
- Stine Andersen (handballer) (born 1993), Danish handball player
