= Lene Lund Høy Karlsen =

Danish handball player (born 1979)

Lene Lund Nielsen
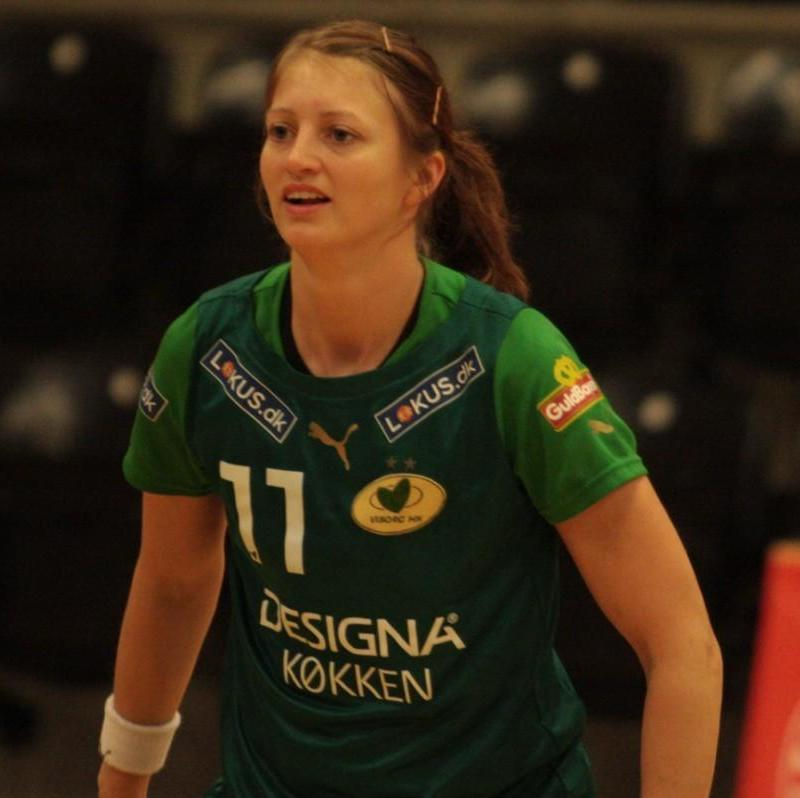
- Lene Lund Nielsen in 2009

Personal information
- Nationality: Danish
- Born: 8 June 1979 (age 47) Gudbjerg, Denmark
- Height: 1.84 m (6 ft 0 in)

Sport
- Sport: Handball
- Position: Pivot

Senior clubs
- Years: Team
- 1997-2000: GOG Håndbold
- 2000-2001: Fredericia HK
- 2001-2003: Odense HK
- 2003-2005: GOG Håndbold
- 2005-2010: Viborg HK
National team
Years	Team	Apps	(Gls)
2003-2009	Denmark	115	(181)
- Updated on January 2024

Lene Lund Høy Karlsen (née Nielsen, born 8 June 1979) is a Danish former handball player. She played her entire career in the Danish league system for, GOG Håndbold, Odense HK, Fredericia HK and Viborg HK.

She was born in Gudbjerg in Denmark and began playing handball in GOG with whom she won bronze medals in 2003. In her first season in Viborg HK she won both the Danish championship as well as the EHF Champions League.

In the 2004-05 edition of the Danish Handball Cup she was named the MVP for the tournament. Despite that she and Viborg HK lost the final to GOG. In the 2007/08 season Karlsen got a competitor for the line place when the German line player Anja Althaus came to Viborg HK from her former club, German Trier. Her contract ran out in the summer of 2010, but she stopped before that because of pregnancy.

On the Danish national team she played 115 national games scoring 181 goals.

She was married June 20, 2009 with Henrik Høy Karlsen in Gudbjerg Kirker.
