= Christina Pedersen (handballer, born 1982) =

Danish handball player (born 1977)

Christina Nimand Hansen
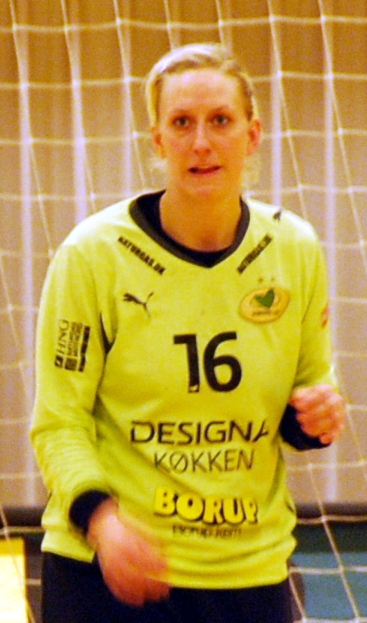
- Christina Pedersen in 2009. Photo: Lars Schmidt

Personal information
- Full name: Christina Nimand Hansen
- Nationality: Danish
- Born: 26 September 1977 (age 49) Copenhagen, Denmark
- Height: 1.80 m (5 ft 11 in)

Sport
- Sport: Handball
- Position: Goalkeeper
- Current club: Retired

Senior clubs
- Years: Team
- 1991–2001: FIF
- 2002–2010: FCK Håndbold
- 2010–2012: Viborg HK
- 2012–2013: FIF
National team
Years	Team	Apps	(Gls)
2002–2012	Denmark	109	(1)

Christina Nimand Hansen (formerly Pedersen; born 15 December 1982) is a Danish former team handball goalkeeper.

At the 2010 European Women's Handball Championship she reached the bronze final and placed fourth with the Danish team.

She started playing handball at the age of 6 at Ajax København. She debuted for the Danish National Team in 2002, but it was first in 2007 she became a stable part of the national team.

In the 2006–07 season she was named the MVP in the Danish Handball Cup. Despite that she and FCK Håndbold lost the final to Viborg HK.

She initially retired in 2013, but made a comeback for FIF in 2014 for a few matches due to Søs Søby getting injured.

She won the Danish Women's Handball Cup in 2010 and 2011, and the Danish Super Cup in 2011 with Viborg HK.
