= Nikoline Lundgreen =

Danish handball player (born 1998)

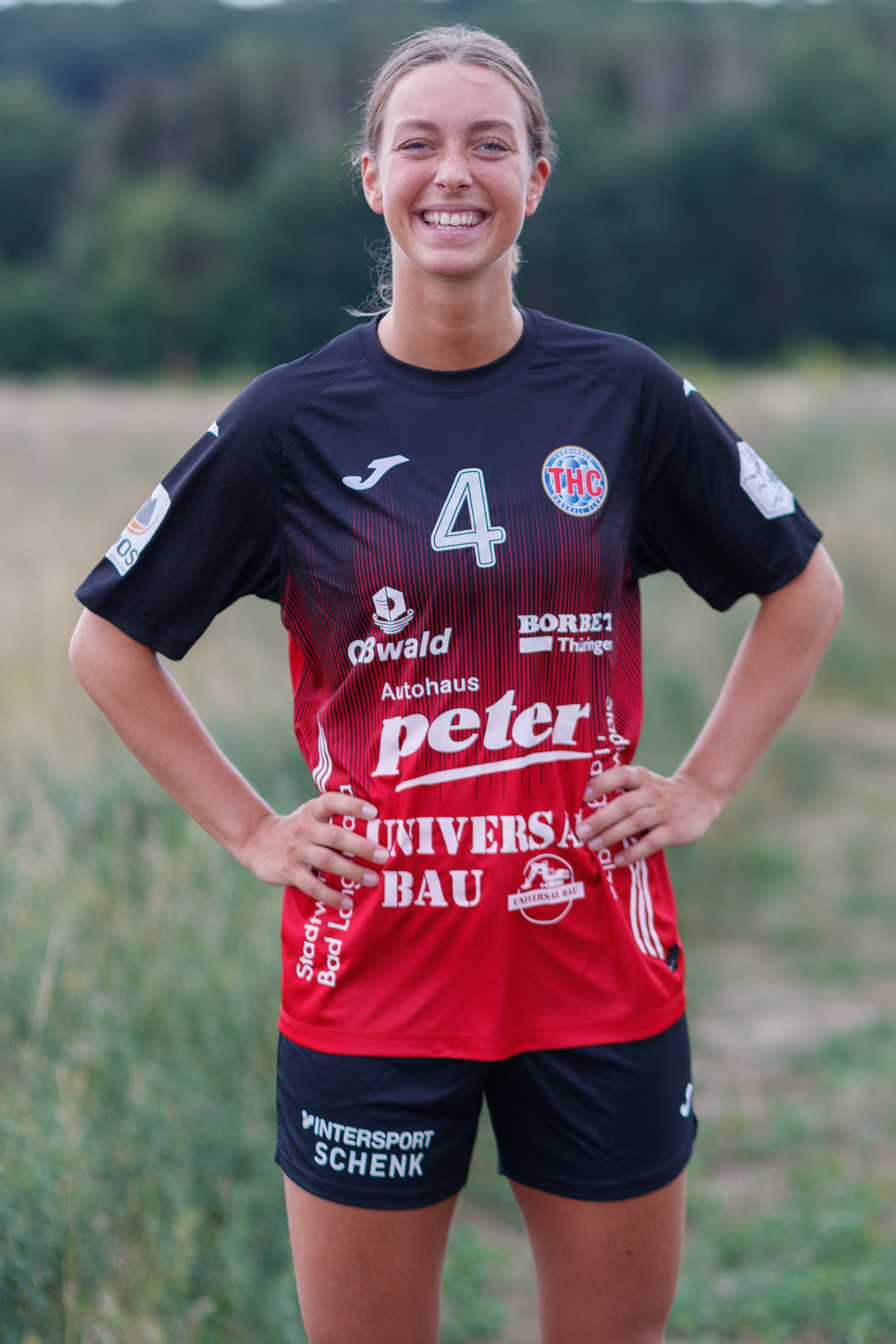

Personal information
- Full name: Nikoline Skals Lundgreen
- Nationality: Danish
- Born: 7 January 1998 (age 28) Faaborg, Denmark
- Height: 1.87 m (6 ft 2 in)

Sport
- Sport: Handball
- Position: Right Back
- Current club: København Håndbold
- Number: 4

Senior clubs
- Years: Team
- -2018: Viborg HK
- 2018-2020: TTH Holstebro
- 2020–2022: Skövde HF
- 2022–2023: Thüringer HC
- 2023–2025: Saint-Amand Handball
- 2025–2026: København Håndbold
Medal record
Youth World Championship
Silver medal – second place	2016 Slovakia
Youth European Championship
Gold medal – first place	2015 Macedonia
Junior European Championship
Silver medal – second place	2017 Slovenia

Nikoline Lundgreen (born 7 January 1998) is a Danish handball player who last plays for København Håndbold.

She represented Denmark in the 2015 European U-17 Championship in Macedonia, leading to the trophy.

== Career ==
She started playing handball at Risøhøj Håndbold. Her first senior appearance came for GOG Håndbold. In 2014 she moved to Viborg HK, where she played for 4 years before moving to Team Tvis Holstebro. She missed the entire first season for the club due to a knee injury. In 2020 she moved to Swedish club Skövde HF. In her first season she scored 109 which was the 6th highest in the league, and in her 2nd season she became the third highest scoring player with 141 goals.

In the 2022 season she moved to the German Bundesliga side Thüringer HC, where she played for a single season before moving to French Saint-Amand Handball.

In 2025 she returned to Denmark and signed for København Håndbold. After a season she was released of her contract by mutual agreement.

== Achievements ==
- Youth World Championship:
  - Silver Medalist: 2016
- European Youth Championship:
  - Winner: 2015
- Junior European Championship:
  - Silver Medalist: 2017
