= Sidsel Bodholt Nielsen =

Danish handball player (born 1989)

Sidsel Bodholt
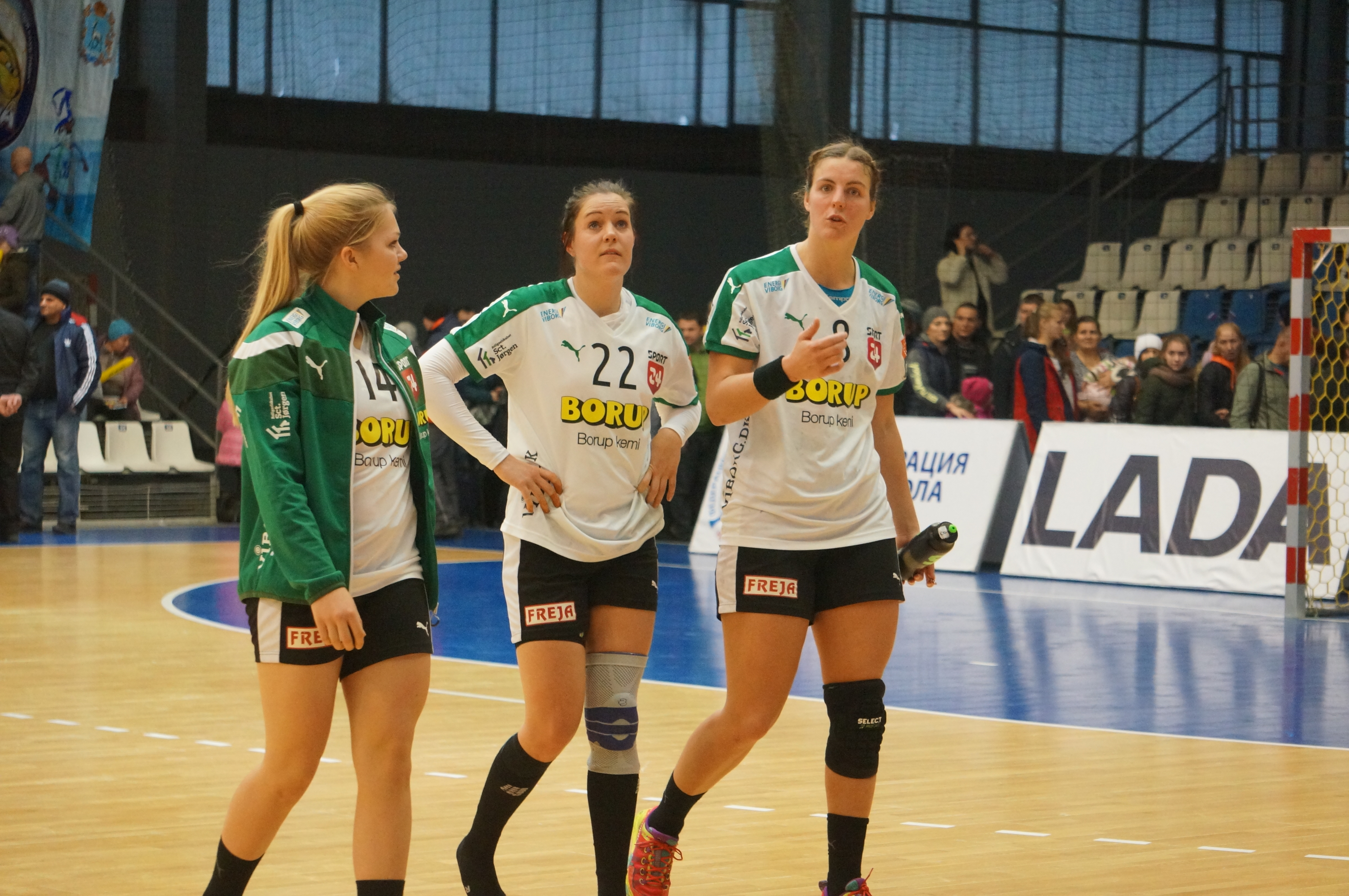

Personal information
- Full name: Sidsel Bodholt Nielsen
- Nationality: Danish
- Born: 8 November 1989 (age 36) Aabenraa, Denmark
- Height: 1.75 m (5 ft 9 in)

Sport
- Sport: Handball
- Position: Left Back
- Current club: Viborg HK
- Number: 22

Youth career
- Years: Team
- –: Viborg HK

Senior clubs
- Years: Team
- -2008: Viborg HK
- 2008–2015: Skive fH
- 2015–2018: Viborg HK

Sidsel Bodholt Nielsen (born 8 November 1989) is a Danish former handball player, who last played for Viborg HK.

She is the twin sister of fellow handball player Stine Bodholt Nielsen.

In 2020 she became the head coach of Danish handball club Randers HK.
