= Sille Thomsen =

Danish handball player (born 1992)

Personal information
- Full name: Sille Gundbæk Thomsen
- Nationality: Danish
- Born: 18 February 1992 (age 34) Køge, Denmark
- Height: 1.71 m (5 ft 7 in)

Sport
- Sport: Handball
- Position: Line Player
- Current club: Ringkøbing Håndbold
- Number: 18

Senior clubs
- Years: Team
- 2011-2013: Randers HK
- 2013-2014: Vejen EH
- 2014-2016: Viborg HK
- 2017-: Ringkøbing

Sille Thomsen (born 18 February 1992) is a Danish handball player who plays for Ringkøbing Håndbold.
