= Carin Strömberg =

Swedish handball player (born 1993)

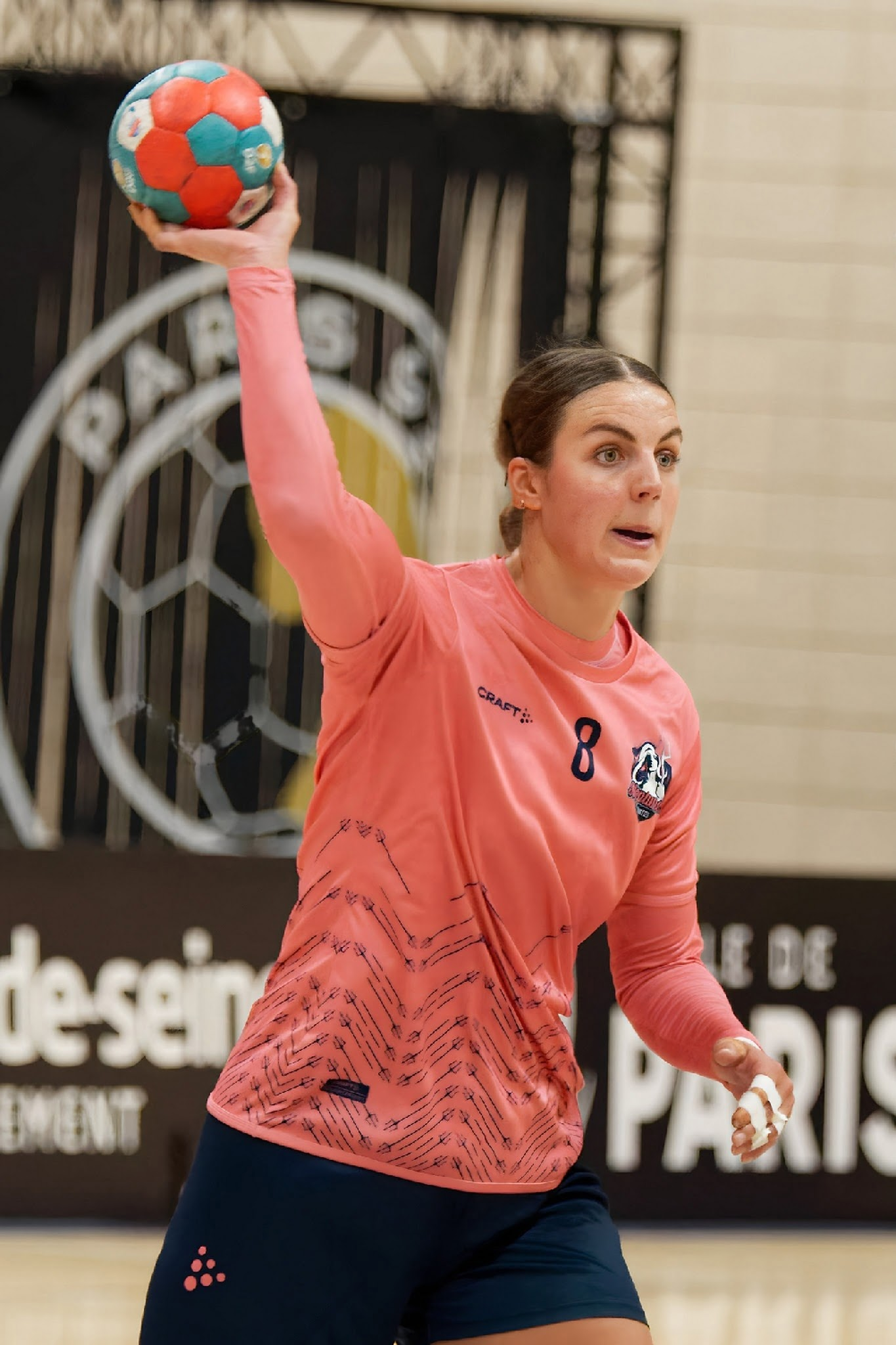

Personal information
- Nationality: Swedish
- Born: 10 July 1993 (age 33) Nacka, Sweden
- Height: 1.84 m (6 ft 0 in)

Sport
- Sport: Handball
- Position: Centre back
- Current club: Chambray Touraine

Senior clubs
- Years: Team
- 2011–2016: Skuru IK
- 2016–2021: Viborg HK
- 2021–2024: Neptunes de Nantes
- 2024–01/2025: Vipers Kristiansand
- 02/2025–: Chambray Touraine
National team
Years	Team	Apps	(Gls)
2013–	Sweden	167	(233)
- Updated on 25 July 2025

Carin Strömberg (born 10 July 1993) is a Swedish handball player for Chambray Touraine Handball and the Swedish national team.

== Career ==
Strömberg started her career at Skuru IK. In 2016 she joined Danish side Viborg HK. In 2021 she was part of the Viborg HK team that finished second in the Danish league. The same summer she joined French team Neptunes de Nantes. When the team went bankrupt in 2024, she moved to Norwegian top team Vipers Kristiansand. In January 2025 she experienced her club going bankrupt for the second time in a year. She then moved to Chambray Touraine Handball.

Strömberg made her debut for the Swedish national team in 2013. She competed at the 2015 World Women's Handball Championship in Denmark, where Sweden finished 9th. Afterwards she has represented Sweden at the 2016, 2020 and 2024 Olympics.

== Individual awards ==
- Most Valuable Player of the Youth World Championship: 2010
