= Amalie Grøn Hansen =

Danish handball player (born 1996)

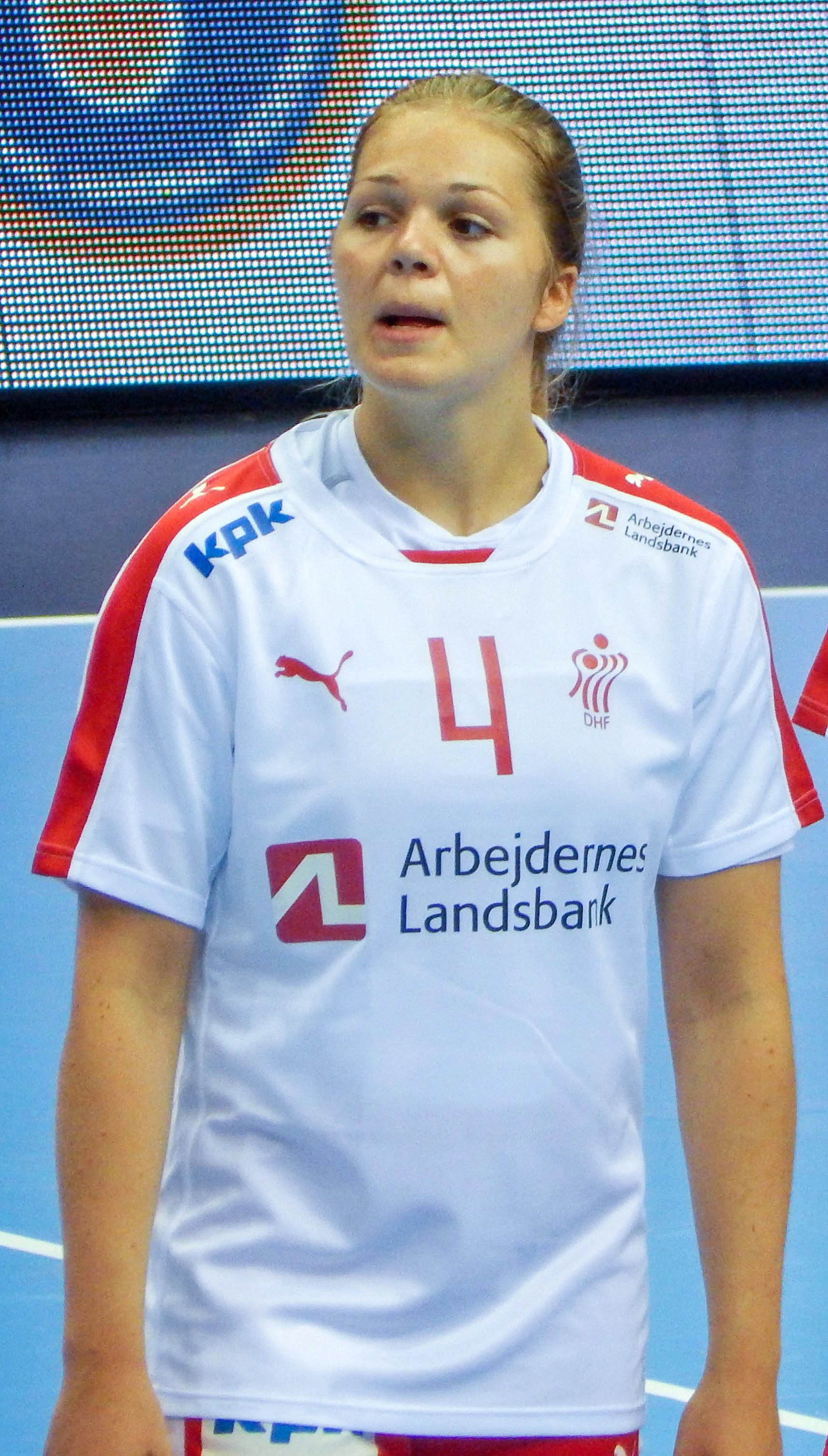

Personal information
- Full name: Amalie Grøn Hansen
- Nationality: Danish
- Born: 30 October 1996 (age 29) Fredericia, Denmark
- Height: 1.70 m (5 ft 7 in)

Sport
- Sport: Handball
- Position: Left wing
- Current club: Viborg HK
- Number: 14

Senior clubs
- Years: Team
- 2014–2016: Skanderborg Håndbold
- 2016–2021: Viborg HK
- 2021–: HH Elite
Medal record
IHF Junior World Championship
Gold medal – first place	2016 Russia

Amalie Grøn Hansen (born 30 October 1996) is a Danish handballer who plays for Viborg HK.
