= Nora Reiche =

German handball player (born 1983)

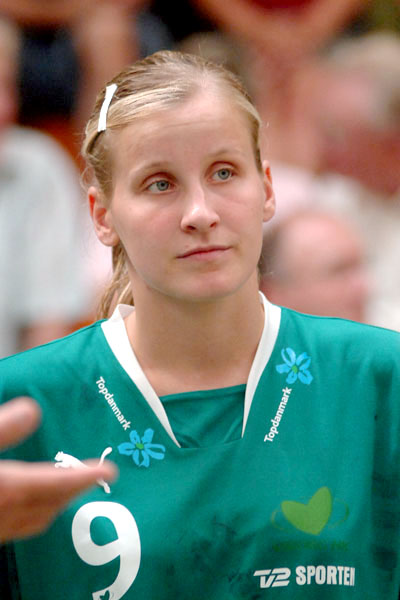

Personal information
- Full name: Nora Reiche
- Born: 16 September 1983 (age 43) Leipzig, Germany
- Height: 1.77 m (5 ft 10 in)

Sport
- Sport: Handball
- Position: Right Back
- Current club: Thüringer HC
- Number: 9

Senior clubs
- Years: Team
- 1994–1997: SSV Stötteritz
- 1997–2007: HC Leipzig
- 2007–2010: Viborg HK
- 2010–2012: Thüringer HC
- 2012-2013: HC Leipzig
National team
| Years | Team | Apps | (Gls) |
| 2004–2009 | Germany | 73 | (141) |
Medal record
World Championship
| Bronze medal – third place | 2007 France | Team |
- Updated on 17 June 2014

Nora Reiche (born 16 September 1983) is a German former handballer who played for the German national team.

== Career ==
Reiches first top flight club was HC Leipzig, where she played from 1997 to 2007. Here she won the 2006-07 Bundesliga and DHB-Pokal double and the DHB-Pokal for a second time in 2008.

She won the Champions League with Viborg HK in 2009. In 2010 she returned to Germany to join Thüringer HC, where she played for two years. Here she won the German championship in 2011 and 2012 and the DHB-Pokal in 2011. She then returned to HC Leipzig to play a single season before retiring.

Reiche made her debut on the German team in 2004. She received a bronze medal at the 2007 World Championship.

== Achievements ==
- Bundesliga:
  - Winner: 2006, 2011, 2012
- German Cup:
  - Winner: 2006, 2007, 2011
- Damehåndboldligaen:
  - Winner: 2008, 2009, 2010
- Danish Cup:
  - Winner: 2007, 2008
- EHF Champions League:
  - Winner: 2009, 2010
- World Championship:
  - Bronze Medalist: 2007
