= Sarah Paulsen =

Danish handball player (born 1997)

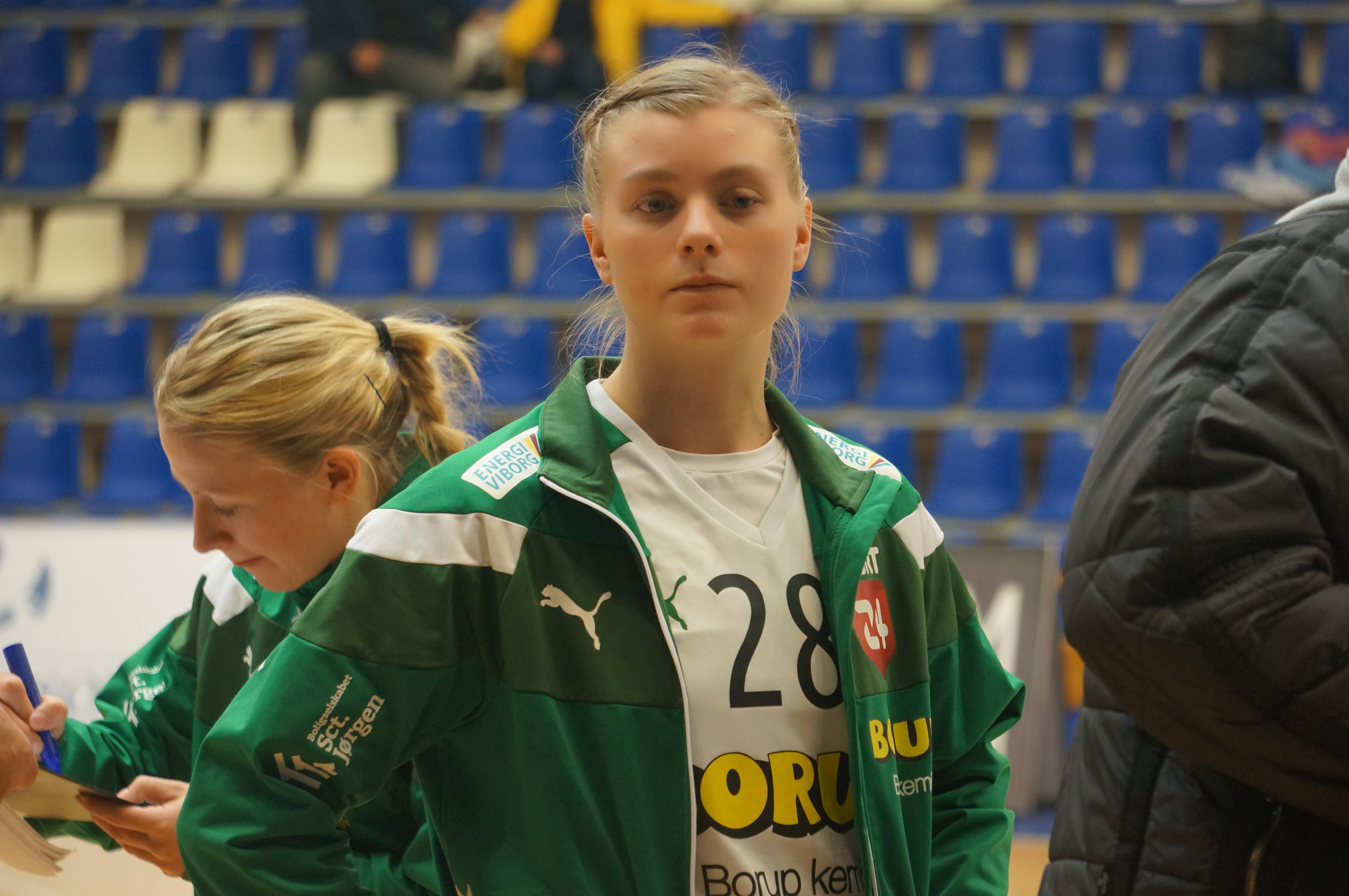

Personal information
- Full name: Sarah Dalsgaard Paulsen
- Nationality: Danish
- Born: 27 August 1997 (age 29) Hedensted, Denmark
- Height: 1.73 m (5 ft 8 in)

Sport
- Sport: Handball
- Position: Left back
- Current club: MKS Lublin
- Number: 28

Youth career
- Years: Team
- 2013-2015: Viborg HK

Senior clubs
- Years: Team
- 2015-2017: Viborg HK
- 2017-2018: Cercle Dijon Bourgogne
- 2018-2021: Molde Elite
- 2021-2026: SønderjyskE Håndbold
- 2026-: MKS Lublin
National team
| Years | Team | Apps | (Gls) |
| 2024– | Denmark | 7 | (14) |
- Updated on 29 November 2025

Sarah Dalsgaard Paulsen (born 27 August 1997 in Hedensted) is a Danish handball player who plays for MKS Lublin and the Danish national team.

== Career ==
Sarah Paulsen joined Viborg HK from her childhood club ØHK Hedensted and became a part their academy. Here she debuted for the first team in a match against SønderjyskE Håndbold at the age of 16 in 2014. She scored 7 goals in the match.

The following years she only saw sporadic playing time, until she extended her contract in 2016 and became a part of the starting line-up.

In 2018 she replaced Sonja Frey in Cercle Dijon Bourgogne.

In February 2021 she signed a two-year deal with SønderjyskE Damehåndbold after three years abroad. In the 2023–24 season she scored the second most goals in the Danish league with 179 goals, only beaten by Line Gyldenløves 191 goals.

She debuted for the Danish national team in November 2024 in a match against Romania. At the 2025 World Championship she played at her first major international tournament. Denmark went out in the quarterfinal to France after winning all matches in the group stages. The Danish team was affected by a lot of players missing the tournament including goalkeepers Sandra Toft and Althea Reinhardt and pivots Sarah Iversen and Rikke Iversen. This was the first time since 2019 that Denmark left a major international tournament without any medals. She acted mainly as a back-up during the tournament.

In March 2026 she was sold to Polish club MKS Lublin.
