= Anne Hykkelbjerg =

Danish handball player (born 2000)

Personal information
- Full name: Anne Kjelstrup Hykkelbjerg
- Nationality: Danish
- Born: 16 January 2000 (age 26) Viborg, Denmark

Sport
- Sport: Handball
- Position: Line Player
- Current club: Søndermarkens IK
- Number: 43

Senior clubs
- Years: Team
- 2017–2020: Viborg HK
- 2020–: Søndermarkens IK
National team
Years	Team	Apps	(Gls)
–	Denmark U-17	19	(42)

Anne Hykkelbjerg (born 16 January 2000) is a Danish handball player who currently plays for Søndermarkens IK. She started her career at Viborg HK, and broke through to the first team in 2017. In 2020 she started playing for Søndermarkens IK, currently playing in the Danish 1st Division

She is also a part of Denmark's national recruit team in handball.
