= Gitte Aaen =

Danish handball player (born 1981)

Personal information
- Full name: Gitte Aaen
- Nationality: Danish
- Born: 7 November 1981 (age 44) Frederikshavn, Denmark
- Height: 167 cm (66 in)

Sport
- Sport: Handball
- Position: Left Wing

Youth career
- Years: Team
- –: Strandby/Elling IF
- –: Sindal IF

Senior clubs
- Years: Team
- –2002: Sindal IF
- 2002–2006: Frederikshavn Fox
- 2006–2010: Viborg HK
- 2010: FC Midtjylland Håndbold
- 2010–2012: Randers HK
National team
Years	Team	Apps	(Gls)
2003–2010	Denmark	36	(101)
- Updated on 7 December 2010

Gitte Aaen (born 7 November 1981) is a Danish former handballer. She won the Champions League with Viborg in 2009

== Career ==
She started playing Handball at the age of 5 at Strandby/Elling IF, before switching to Frederikshavn fI. While playing in Frederikshavn, she took an education as a nurse.

At the age of 20 in 2006 she switched to Viborg HK, one of the most successful clubs in Denmark. She had an initial contract of 3 years, which was extended only a year after by an additional year. With Viborg HK she won the EHF Champions League twice in 2009 and 2010 as well as the Danish League 3 times.

In the Spring of 2010, she was informed that her contract would not be extended past 2010, so she signed with the Austrian club Hypo Niederösterreich. She did however never join the club, as they changed managers, and canceled all contracts initiated by the former manager Gunnar Prokop.

Instead she played as an amateur for the Danish club FC Midtjylland, before signing a 3-year contract with Randers HK. After two years, in 2012, Randers HK however used an option to cancel the contract, citing as the reason, that they could not afford to pay for two left wing players, and they preferred Mie Augustesen.

She debuted for the Danish national team on 14 June 2003 versus Iceland. She was at her first major international tournament in 2008. In 2010 she was initially left out of the squad, but due to injuries she played twice 2010 European Women's Handball Championship.

== Achievements ==
- Damehåndboldligaen:
  - Winner: 2008, 2009, 2010
- Landspokalturneringen:
  - Winner: 2006, 2007, 2008
- EHF Champions League:
  - Winner: 2009, 2010
