= Clara Høgh-Poulsen =

Danish handball player (born 1998)

Personal information
- Nationality: Danish
- Born: 26 May 1998 (age 28) Viborg, Denmark
- Height: 1.74 m (5 ft 9 in)

Sport
- Sport: Handball
- Position: Left Back
- Current club: Viborg HK
- Number: 44

Senior clubs
- Years: Team
- 2016-2018: Viborg HK
National team
- Years: Team
- –: Denmark

Clara Høgh-Poulsen (born 26 May 1998) is a Danish former handball player who played her entire senior and junior career for Viborg HK. She debuted for the Viborg HK first team while still being a youth player against Slavia Prague in the EHF Cup. She retired in 2018 at the age of only 20, but continued to play handball for the Viborg HK b-team in the 3rd division.

Her sister, Marie Høgh-Poulsen, is also a professional handballer.
