= Marie-Paule Gnabouyou =

French handball player (born 1988)

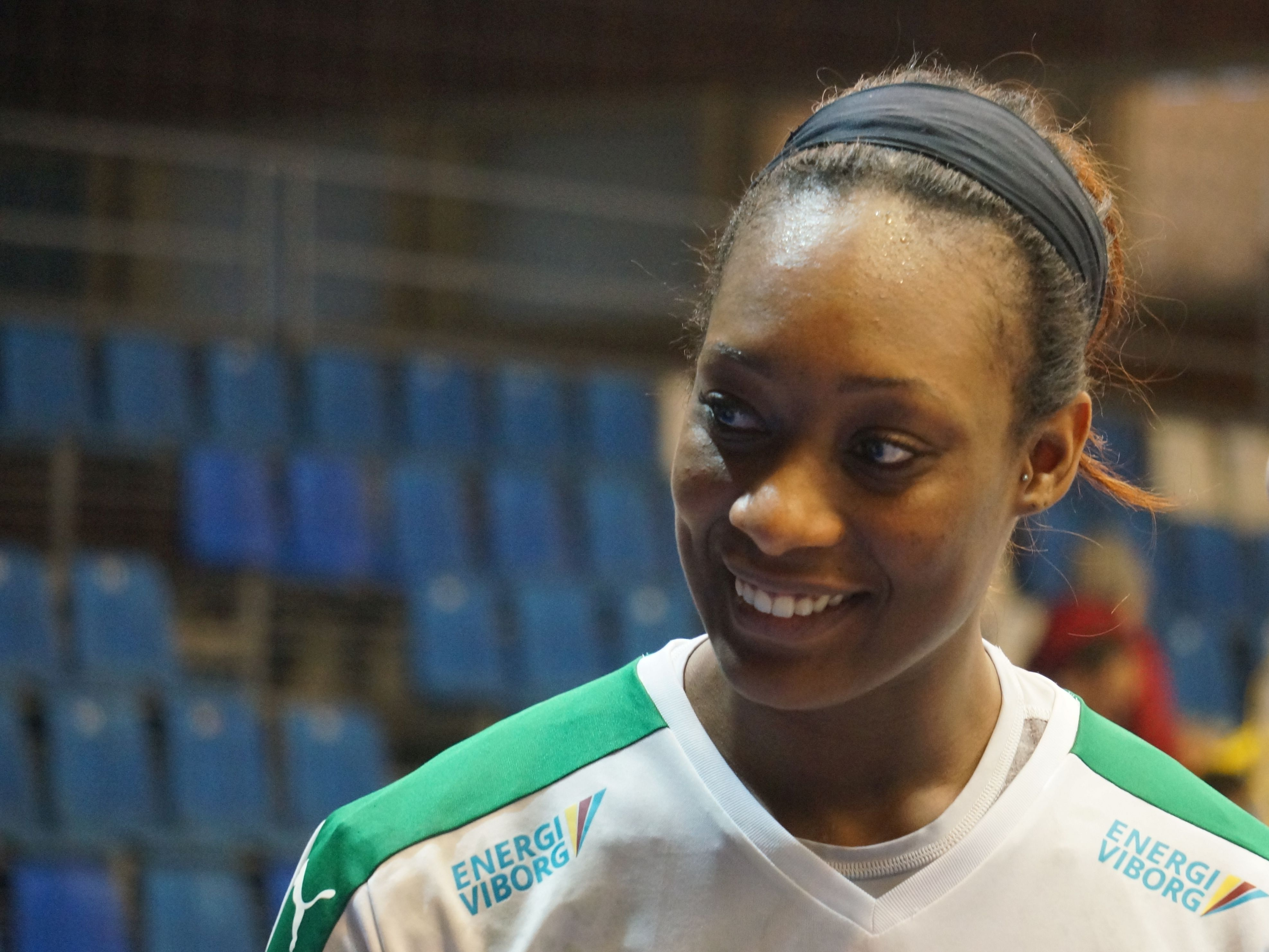
- Gnabouyou in 2016

Personal information
- Nationality: French
- Born: 4 March 1988 (age 38) Marseille, France
- Height: 1.85 m (6 ft 1 in)

Sport
- Sport: Handball
- Position: Right back
- Current club: Toulon
- Number: 4

Senior clubs
- Years: Team
- 2007–2008: Issy Ies Moulineaux
- 2008–2015: Toulon
- 2015–2017: Viborg HK
- 2017–2018: Siófok KC
- 2019–2019: RK Krim
- 2019–2021: Toulon
- 2021–: OGC Nice Côte d'Azur Handball
National team
Years	Team	Apps	(Gls)
2010–	France	78	(104)
Medal record
World Championship
Silver medal – second place	2011 Brazil
European Championship
Bronze medal – third place	2016 Sweden

Marie-Paule Gnabouyou (born 4 March 1988) is a French handball player for Toulon Saint-Cyr Var Handball and the French national team.

Marie-Paule Gnabouyou participated at the 2011 World Women's Handball Championship in Brazil. Her brother Guy Gnabouyou is a professional footballer.

She is of Congolese origin.
