= Kristina Bille =

Danish team handball player (born 1986)

Personal information
- Nationality: Danish
- Born: 3 April 1986 (age 40) Farsø, Denmark
- Height: 1.68 m (5 ft 6 in)

Sport
- Sport: Handball
- Position: Right wing

Senior clubs
- Years: Team
- 2004–2007: Viborg HK
- 2007–2011: Aalborg DH
- 2011–2012: RK Krim (Slovenia)
- 2012–2014: Larvik HK (Norway)
- 2014–2015: Skive fH
- 2015–2016: Vendsyssel Håndbold
- 2016–2018: EH Aalborg
National team
Years	Team	Apps	(Gls)
2005–2013	Denmark	100	(155)
- Updated on January 2024

Kristina Bille (born 3 April 1986) is a Danish former team handball player. She played on the Danish national team, and participated at the 2011 World Women's Handball Championship in Brazil.

== Individual awards ==
- All-Star Best player of the Danish 1st Division: 2015/16, 2016/17
