= Moa Högdahl Schønningsen =

Norwegian handball player (born 1996)

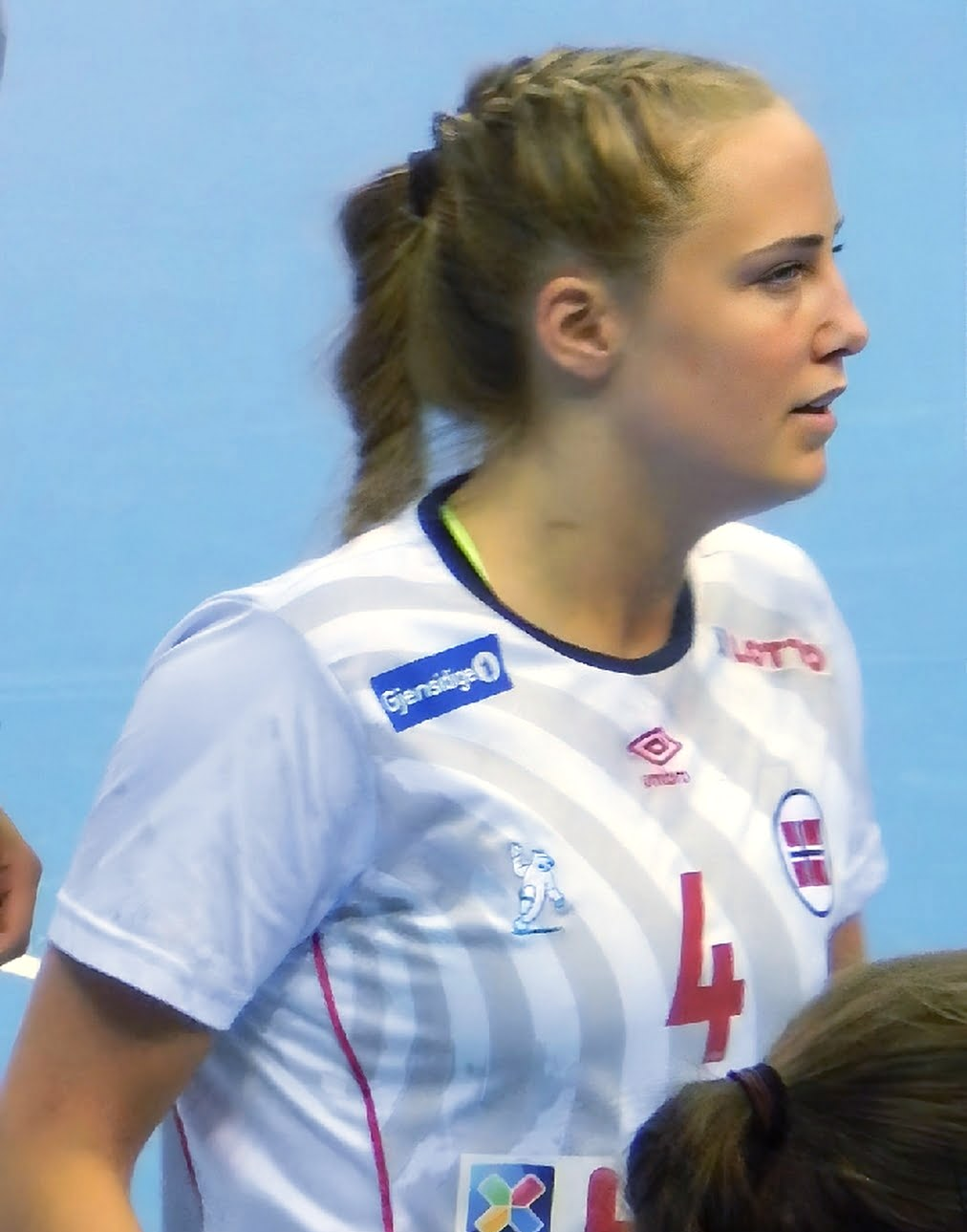
- Högdahl in 2016

Personal information
- Nationality: Norwegian, Swedish
- Born: 14 March 1996 (age 30) Trondheim, Norway
- Height: 1.78 m (5 ft 10 in)

Sport
- Sport: Handball
- Position: Right back
- Current club: Nykøbing Falster Håndboldklub
- Number: 6

Senior clubs
- Years: Team
- 2012–2014: Strindheim IL
- 2014–2018: Byåsen HE
- 2018–2023: Viborg HK
- 2023–: Nykøbing Falster Håndboldklub
National team
Years	Team	Apps	(Gls)
2018–2022	Norway	38	(42)
Medal record
World Championship
Gold medal – first place	2021 Spain

Moa Högdahl Schønningsen (born 14 March 1996) is a Swedish-Norwegian handball player for Nykøbing Falster Håndboldklub and the Norwegian national team. She is a world champion from the 2021 World Women's Handball Championship.

She also represented Norway at the 2016 Women's Junior World Handball Championship, placing 5th, at the 2015 Women's Under-19 European Handball Championship, placing 6th and at the 2013 Youth European Championship, placing 7th.

== Club career ==
She started playing handdball aged 6 at her home town club Strindheim IL. In 2014 she joined Norwegian first league team Byåsen IL. In the 2015-16 she missed a lot of the season due to a fractured ankle. On 30 May 2018 she made her debut for the Norwegian national team. For the 2018-19 season she joined Danish side Viborg HK. In 2023 she joined league rivals Nykøbing Falster Håndboldklub.

== Personal life ==
She is the daughter of Swedish former international handballer, Mia Hermansson-Högdahl and Swedish handball coach Arne Högdahl. She is married to international handballer Simen Schønningsen, with whom she has a son.
