= Anne Sofie Filtenborg =

Danish handball player (born 1998)

Personal information
- Full name: Anne Sofie Møldrup Nielsen Filtenborg
- Nationality: Danish
- Born: 30 December 1998 (age 27) Randers, Denmark
- Height: 1.79 m (5 ft 10 in)

Sport
- Sport: Handball
- Position: Right wing
- Current club: HH Elite
- Number: 62

Youth career
- Years: Team
- 2015-2017: Randers HK

Senior clubs
- Years: Team
- 2017-2020: Viborg HK
- 2020-: HH Elite
National team
Years	Team	Apps	(Gls)
2017-	Denmark U-19	18	(14)
Medal record
Youth World Championship
Silver medal – second place	2016 Slovakia
Youth European Championship
Gold medal – first place	2015 Macedonia
Junior European Championship
Silver medal – second place	2017 Slovenia

Anne Sofie Filtenborg (born 30 December 1998) is a Danish handball player for HH Elite and the Danish junior national team.

She also represented Denmark in the 2015 European Women's U-17 Handball Championship in Macedonia, leading to the trophy.

== Achievements ==
- Youth World Championship:
  - Silver Medalist: 2016
- European Youth Championship:
  - Winner: 2015
- Junior European Championship:
  - Silver Medalist: 2017
