= Viborg HK =

Danish handball club

- Full name: Viborg Håndboldklub ApS
- Short name: VHK
- Founded: March 19, 1936; 90 years ago (as Idrætsklubben Viborg)
- Arena: BioCirc Arena
- Capacity: 2,865 (1,883 seats)
- President: Jens Steffensen
- Head coach: Anders Friis
- Captain: Maria Fisker
- League: Bambusa Kvindeligaen
- 2024–25: 6th
- Club colours
Home	Away

Location of VHK

Viborg HK (Viborg Håndbold Klub) is a Danish professional handball club from Viborg. The club has many teams for both women and men, but especially the professional women's team is one of the most successful in Danish and European handball since the beginning of the 1990s. This team currently competes in the women's Danish Women's Handball League.

The women's team have won a total of 14 Danish Championships (all-time record), ten Danish Cup Championships (ranking second in all-time Cup trophies behind FIF), three Women's EHF Cup Championships (all-time record), and three EHF Women's Champions League Championships (ranking fifth in all-time Champions League trophies). They are also two-time winners of the now cancelled tournament EHF Champions Trophy and one-time winner of the EHF Women's Cup Winners' Cup.

They won the EHF Women's Champions League in the 2009/2010 season and won the second time in a row. They also held the title in the 2005–2006 season.

They have a local rivalry with fellow Midtjylland team Ikast Håndbold.

== History ==
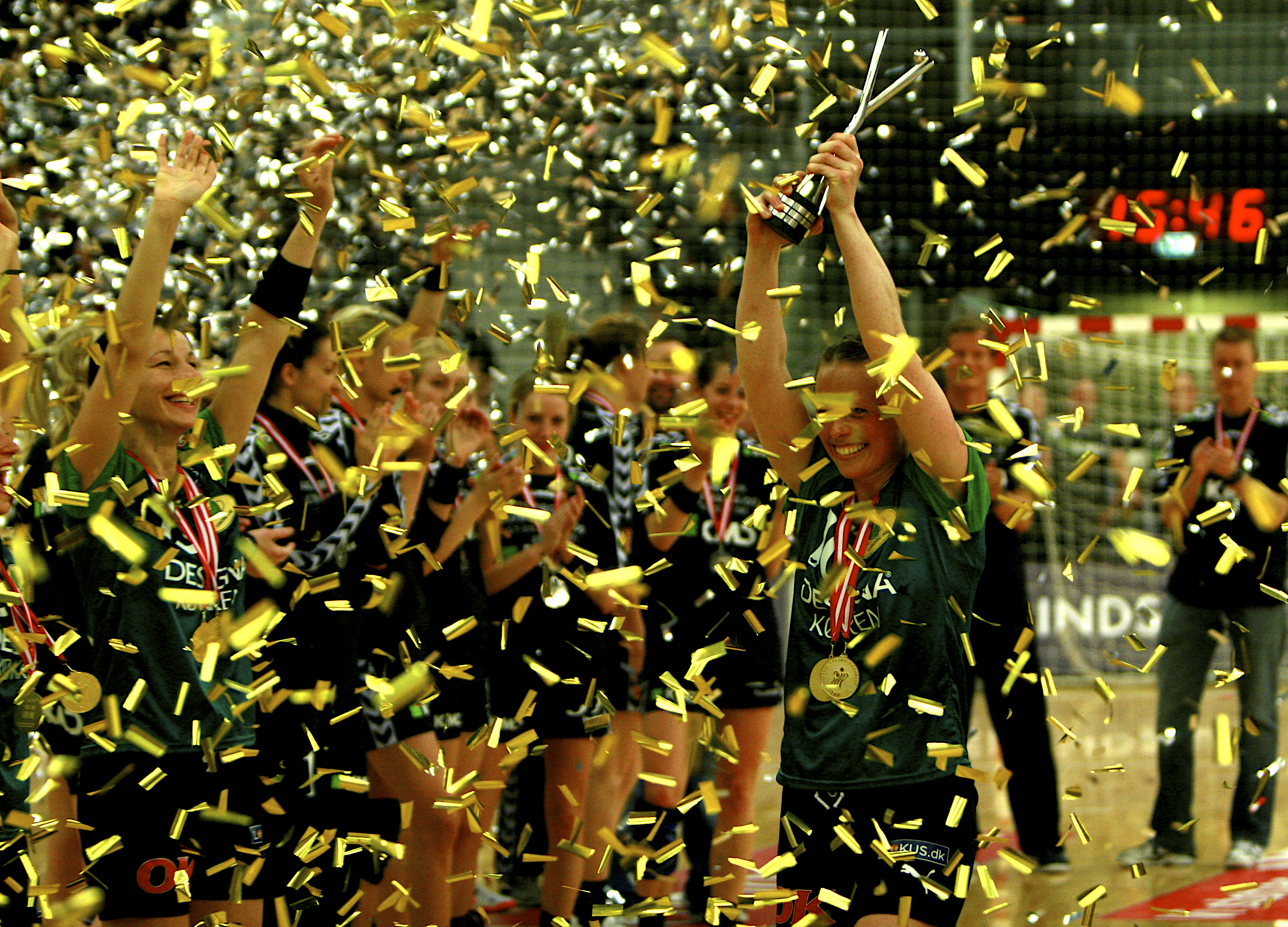
Henriette Mikkelsen with the title in 2009

The club was established in 1936, but it was not until 1989 the women's team was promoted to the best league in Denmark. Manager of the team at that time was a young Ulrik Wilbek, who later became national manager for Denmark and was extremely successful here as well. Among the players at the time of the promotion was Anja Andersen and goalkeeper Susanne Munk Lauritsen.

Since the promotion, Viborg HK has had overwhelming success with 13 National Championships from 1994 to 2010 and only twice ended below third place in the league. By winning their 13th National Championship 22 May 2010, they became the club with most won Danish Championships in the women's league ever, taking the record from former title holder FIF with 12 Danish Championships. They are now tied with H.G. Handball in the men's league as the club with most won National Championships in Danish handball history. Viborg Handball Club is also one of only three teams to have won the national championship four consecutive times. The other two being GOG and Frederiksberg IF.

(As of 2010) Viborg HK is the only team in the women's league besides Slagelse DT and later Odense Håndbold to finish the season with all the matches won in their National League – 22 matches (Season 2008/2009), and the only team to win 28 times in a row.

In European tournaments, the team has reached the finals several times and won a lot of titles, the greatest of them being the EHF Women's Champions League, which they won in 2006, 2009 and 2010. They are as of 2010, the most successful Danish Handball club and the fourth most successful handball club in EHF Women's Champions League with 3 gold medals and 2 silver medals, ranking behind RK Radnicki Belgrade with 3 gold medals and 4 silver medals, Hypo Niederösterreich with 8 gold medals and 5 silver medals, and finally Spartak Kyiv with a total of 13 gold medals and 2 silver medals.

They are as of 2010, currently the most winning women's team in Women's EHF Cup history, with three titles.

The 30 May 2009, became the biggest triumph for the Danish women's team. Not only did Viborg HK win their 12th National Championship, they also became the first Danish handball team, both on the men's and women's side to win all three major titles ("The Treble") in the same season. The Danish Women's Handball Cup, The EHF Women's Champions League and the Danish Championship.

However, in the 2010/2011 season, Viborg had to win with an excess of 9 goals against Dinamo Volgograd to advance from the mainround. They won with 7 goals, meaning that Viborg wouldn't be able to defend their EHF Women's Champions League title.

In 2015, the controversial investment company Hellerup Finans took a major stake in the handball club and its holding company. Its investment resulted in a doubling of the club value but it began to seek an agreement to sell the club that same year, eventually selling it to a group of local businessmen for DKK 820,000 while retaining the shell holding company and renaming it Hellerup Consulting Group.

After winning the Championship in 2014, the team has seen less success and has generally been overtaken by Odense Håndbold and Team Esbjerg.

The men's team has not been quite as successful. It was only in 1999 a promotion to the best league was reached. Since then, the best result has been a second place in 2007. After the 2012-13 season, Viborg HK decided to pull their men's team out of the league to focus on the women's team.

== Kits ==
HOME

2020-

AWAY
2015-16	2016-18	2018-19	2020-

== Results ==
- Danish Championship:
  - Gold: 1994, 1995, 1996, 1997, 1999, 2000, 2001, 2002, 2004, 2006, 2008, 2009, 2010, 2014
  - Silver: 1991, 1993, 1998, 2005, 2007, 2012, 2021
  - Bronze: 2011, 2013, 2018, 2020
- Danish Cup:
  - Winner: 1993, 1994, 1996, 2003, 2007, 2008, 2009, 2010, 2011, 2013, 2014
- Danish Super Cup
  - Winner: 2011, 2021
- Champions League:
  - Winner: 2006, 2009, 2010
  - Finalist: 1997, 2001
- EHF European League:
  - Winner: 1994, 1999, 2004
  - Finalist: 2022
  - Bronze: 2026
- Cup Winners' Cup:
  - Winner: 2014
  - Finalist: 2012
- EHF Champions Trophy:
  - Winner: 2000/01, 2005/06

== Team ==
=== Current squad ===
Squad for the 2026-27 season

Goalkeepers

- 12 (Denmark) Stine Broløs Kristensen
- 16 (Denmark) Louise Bak
- 66 (Denmark) Maria Koerth

Wingers
LW

- 7 (Switzerland) Era Baumann
- 8 (Netherlands) Robin van Galen

RW

- 10 (Denmark) Melina Kristensen
- 18 (Denmark) Henriette Hansen
- 25 (Denmark) Trine Østergaard
- 76 (Denmark) Frida Johannesen

Pivots

- 19 (Denmark) Sara Hald (pregnant)
- 34 (Denmark) Sofie Bardrum
- 76 (Sweden) Ofelia Shoai Hallberg

Back players
LB

- 5 (Norway) Marielle Martinsen
- 22 (Norway) Ragnhild Valle Dahl
- 31 (Denmark) Marianne Haugsted

CB

- 17 (Denmark) Simone Petersen
- 48 (Denmark) Cecilie Zimmer
- 77 (Faroe Islands) Jana Mittún

RB

- 28 (Denmark) Clara Skyum Thomsen
- 49 (Denmark) Clara Bro Veilgaard

=== Retired numbers ===
Viborg HK
No.	Player	Position	Tenure	Matches	Seasons
2	(Denmark) Rikke Skov	Left Back	1994–2016	648	18

=== Transfers ===
Transfers for the season 2027–28

Joining

- (Denmark) Line Berggren Larsen (CB) (from (Denmark) København Håndbold)
- (Kosovo) Verona Rexhepi (LB) (from (Denmark) Ringkøbing Håndbold)

Leaving

=== Technical staff ===
- (Denmark) Head Coach: Anders Friis
- (Denmark) Assistant coach: Susanne Munk Wilbek
- (Denmark) Team Leader: Liss Kristensen
- (Denmark) Physiotherapist: Morten Vanggaard Nielsen

== Notable former players ==
=== Goalkeepers ===
- (Denmark) Susanne Munk Lauritsen (1986-2001)
- (Denmark) Christina Pedersen (2010-2012)
- (Denmark) Louise Bager Due (2001-2012, 2016–2017)
- (Denmark) Rikke Poulsen (2014-2019)
- (Denmark) Mie Sørensen (2016-2017)
- (Norway) Heidi Tjugum (1997-2003)
- (Norway) Katrine Lunde (2007-2010)
- (France) Valérie Nicolas (2003-2007)
- (France) Cléopâtre Darleux (2012-2014)
- (France) Aurélie Rouquette (2007-2008)
- (Sweden) Cecilia Grubbström (2012-2013)
- (Sweden) Hanna Daglund (2017-2019)
- (Brazil) Chana Masson (2013-2015)
- (Croatia) Katarina Bralo (2009-2010)

=== Right wings ===
- (Denmark) Janne Kolling (1991-1997)
- (Denmark) Helle Simonsen (1997-2001)
- (Denmark) Louise Pedersen (2001-2003)
- (Denmark) Louise Lyksborg (2012-2016)
- (Denmark) Simone Böhme (2015-2017)
- (Denmark) Kristina Bille (2004-2007)
- (Denmark) Josephine Touray (1997-1999)
- (Norway) Emilie Hovden (2022-2023)
- (Romania) Cristina Vărzaru (2005-2012)
- (Hungary) Mónika Kovacsicz (2008-2010)
- (Netherlands) Saskia Mulder (2003–2005)
- (Germany) Nora Reiche (2007-2010)
- (North Macedonia) Natasa Nolevska (2017-2018)

=== Right backs ===
- (Denmark) Mette Klit (1991-1996, 1998–2000)
- (Denmark) Louise Burgaard (2013-2015)
- (Denmark) Anne Cecilie de la Cour (2009-2013)
- (Denmark) Julie Aagaard (2011-2012)
- (Denmark) Merethe Hansen (2000-2002)
- (Norway) Ida Bjørndalen Karlsson (2007-2009)
- (Norway) Amanda Kurtović (2012-2014)
- (Norway) Moa Högdahl (2018-2023)
- (Norway) Mathilde Rivas Toft (2021-2023)
- (France) Marie-Paule Gnabouyou (2015-2017)
- (Germany) Grit Jurack (2004-2012)
- (Netherlands) Natasja Burgers (2002-2004)
- (Netherlands) Sanne van Olphen (2017-2018)
- (Hungary) Rita Borók (2000-2002)
- (Hungary) Helga Németh (2003-2004)
- (Spain) Isabel Ortuño (2004-2007)

=== Line players ===
- (Denmark) Karen Brødsgaard (1998-2003)
- (Denmark) Mette Gravholt (2014-2015)
- (Denmark) Sille Thomsen (2014-2016)
- (Denmark) Lene Lund Høy Karlsen (2005-2010)
- (Denmark) Stine Bodholt Nielsen (2016-2019)
- (Denmark) Charlotte Højfeldt (1995-1999; 2003–2007)
- (Denmark) Sabine Pedersen (2012-2014)
- (Norway) Marit Malm Frafjord (2010-2014)
- (Germany) Anja Althaus (2007-2012)
- (Netherlands) Olga Assink (2003-2007, 2009–2010)
- (Russia) Natalya Deryugina (1995-2003)
- (Sweden) Kristina Flognman (2013-2014)

=== Central backs ===
- (Denmark) Rikke Skov (1994-2016)
- (Denmark) Heidi Astrup (1989-1997, 1999–2003, 2005–2007, 2009–2010, 2015–2016)
- (Denmark) Lotte Kiærskou (2001-2005)
- (Denmark) Jane Schumacher (2006-2008)
- (Denmark) Berit Kristensen (1999-2004)
- (Denmark) Line Uno (2015-2019)
- (Denmark) Christina Pedersen (2022–2025)
- (Norway) Siri Seglem (2015-2017)
- (Norway) Vibeke Nesse (2000-2002)
- (Norway) Tonje Enkerud (2021–2023)
- (China) Chao Zhai (2004-2011)
- (Sweden) Johanna Ahlm (2009-2013)
- (Sweden) Isabelle Gulldén (2011-2015)
- (Sweden) Carin Strömberg (2016-2021)
- (Netherlands) Maura Visser (2014-2015)
- (Hungary) Barbara Bognár (2015-2016)
- (Tunisia) Mouna Chebbah (2010-2014)

=== Left backs ===
- (Denmark) Anja Andersen (1988-1990)
- (Denmark) Katrine Fruelund (1999-2005)
- (Denmark) Pernille Holst Holmsgaard (2011-2013)
- (Denmark) Trine Troelsen (2003-2007)
- (Denmark) Line Haugsted (2016-2022)
- (Denmark) Kristina Jørgensen (2017-2022)
- (Denmark) Sarah Paulsen (2013-2017)
- (Denmark) Anne Dorthe Tanderup (1992-1998)
- (Denmark) Lene Thomsen (2005-2008)
- (Montenegro) Bojana Popović (2007-2010)
- (Norway) Kristine Lunde-Borgersen (2007-2010)
- (Norway) Tonje Larsen (1998-1999)
- (France) Leila Lejeune (2002-2004)
- (Romania) Carmen Amariei (2010-2011)
- (Sweden) Linnea Torstenson (2013-2014)
- (Hungary) Anita Bulath (2012-2013)
- (Austria) Gorica Aćimović (2009-2011)
- (Serbia) Sanja Damnjanović (2013-2015)

=== Left wings ===
- (Denmark) Henriette Mikkelsen (2003-2012, 2013–2015)
- (Denmark) Anette Hoffmann (1990-1997)
- (Denmark) Ann Grete Nørgaard (2000-2006, 2008–2009, 2015–2019)
- (Denmark) Gitte Aaen (2006-2010)
- (Denmark) Christina Roslyng (1997-2003, 2007–2008)
- (Denmark) Maria Fisker (2006-2009, 2011–2015)
- (Denmark) Lærke Nolsøe (2021-2023)
- (Denmark) Jane Wangsøe (1997-2000)
- (Montenegro) Maja Savić (2010-2011)
- (Norway) Camilla Thorsen (2000-2005)
- (Norway) Silje Mari Berget (2003-2004)
- (Norway) Anne Kjersti Suvdal (2013-2014)
- (United Kingdom) Holly Lam-Moores (2012-2013)

== Coaching history ==
- (Denmark) Lars Friis-Hansen (1995–1998)
- (Denmark) Ryan Zinglersen (2004–2005)
- (Sweden) Tomas Ryde (2005–2008)
- (Denmark) Jakob Vestergaard (2008–2011; 2018–2023)
- (Denmark) Martin Albertsen (2002–2004; 2011–2012)
- (Iceland) Oskar Bjarni Oskarsson (2012–2013)
- (Denmark) Christian Dalmose (2013–2015)
- (Denmark) Allan Heine (2015–2018)
- (Denmark) Ulrik Wilbek (1988–1991; 1998–2002)
- (Denmark) Mette Klit (2011)
- (Denmark) Heidi Astrup
- (Denmark) Ole Bitsch (2023–)

== Previous squads ==
Squad for the 2020–21 season

Goalkeepers

- 1 (Sweden) Emma Friberg
- 12 (Denmark) Anna Kristensen

Wingers
LW

- 9 (Denmark) Laura Holm
- 14 (Denmark) Amalie Grøn Hansen
- 25 (Denmark) Maria Stokholm

RW

- 7 (Denmark) Stine Andersen
- 18 (Denmark) Sanne Beck Hansen
- 23 (Denmark) Thilde Frandsen

Line players

- 13 (Sweden) Madeleine Östlund
- 21 (Denmark) Majbritt Toft Hansen
- 31 (Denmark) Ida-Marie Dahl

Back players
LB

- 10 (Denmark) Kristina Jørgensen
- 11 (Denmark) Line Haugsted
- 54 (Denmark) Marianne Haugsted

CB

- 4 (Denmark) Laura Damgaard
- 8 (Sweden) Carin Strömberg (c)

RB

- 6 (Norway) Moa Högdahl
- 22 (Denmark) Pauline Bøgelund

Squad for the 2019–20 season

Goalkeepers

- 12 (Denmark) Anna Kristensen
- 24 (Denmark) Josephine Nordstrøm Olsen

Wingers
LW

- 14 (Denmark) Amalie Grøn Hansen
- 25 (Denmark) Maria Stokholm

RW

- 7 (Denmark) Stine Andersen
- 62 (Denmark) Anne Sofie Filtenborg

Line players

- 13 (Sweden) Madeleine Östlund
- 21 (Denmark) Majbritt Toft Hansen
- 31 (Denmark) Ida-Marie Dahl

Back players
LB

- 10 (Denmark) Kristina Jørgensen
- 11 (Denmark) Line Haugsted

CB

- 4 (Denmark) Laura Damgaard
- 8 (Sweden) Carin Strömberg (c)

RB

- 6 (Norway) Moa Högdahl
- 22 (Denmark) Pauline Bøgelund

Squad for the 2018–19 season

Goalkeepers

- 1 (Sweden) Hanna Daglund
- 12 (Denmark) Rikke Poulsen
- 24 (Denmark) Josephine Nordstrøm Olsen

Wingers

- 14 (Denmark) Amalie Grøn Hansen
- 23 (Denmark) Ann Grete Nørgaard Østerballe

RW

- 7 (Denmark) Stine Andersen
- 62 (Denmark) Anne Sofie Filtenborg

Line players

- 9 (Denmark) Stine Bodholt Nielsen
- 31 (Denmark) Ida-Marie Dahl
- 43 (Denmark) Anne Hykkelbjerg

LB

- 10 (Denmark) Kristina Jørgensen
- 11 (Denmark) Line Haugsted
- 97 (Denmark) Marianne Haugsted

CB

- 8 (Sweden) Carin Strömberg (c)
- 93 (Denmark) Line Uno

RB

- 6 (Norway) Moa Högdahl
- 22 (Denmark) Pauline Bøgelund

Squad for the 2017–18 season

Goalkeepers

- (Sweden) Hanna Daglund
- (Denmark) Rikke Poulsen
- (Denmark) Josephine Nordstrøm Olsen

Wingers
LW

- (Denmark) Ann Grete Nørgaard Østerballe
- (Denmark) Marie Høgh-Poulsen
- (Denmark) Amalie Grøn Hansen

RW

- (North Macedonia) Nataša Nolevska
- (Denmark) Anne Sofie Filtenborg

Line players

- (Denmark) Stine Bodholt Nielsen
- (Denmark) Mathilde Storgaard
- (Denmark) Anne Hykkelbjerg
- (Denmark) Signe Hald

Back players
LB

- (Denmark) Line Haugsted
- (Denmark) Kristina Jørgensen
- (Denmark) Clara Høgh-Poulsen

CB

- (Denmark) Line Uno
- (Sweden) Carin Strömberg

RB

- (Denmark) Nikoline Lundgreen
- (Denmark) Sidsel Bodholt Nielsen
- (Netherlands) Sanne van Olphen

Squad for the 2016–17 season

Goalkeepers

- (Denmark) Rikke Poulsen
- (Denmark) Signe Brun
- (Denmark) Josephine Nordstrøm Olsen
- (Denmark) Mie Sørensen

Wingers
LW

- (Denmark) Ann Grete Nørgaard Østerballe
- (Denmark) Karen Nørgaard Østerballe
- (Denmark) Amalie Grøn Hansen

RW

- (Denmark) Simone Böhme

Line players

- (Denmark) Stine Bodholt Nielsen
- (Denmark) Mathilde Storgaard

Back players
LB

- (Denmark) Rikke Skov
- (Denmark) Line Haugsted
- (Denmark) Clara Høgh-Poulsen

CB

- (Norway) Siri Seglem
- (Denmark) Line Uno
- (Sweden) Carin Strömberg

RB

- (Denmark) Nikoline Lundgreen
- (Denmark) Sidsel Bodholt Nielsen
- (France) Marie-Paule Gnabouyou

Squad for the 2015–16 season

Goalkeepers

- (Denmark) Rikke Poulsen
- (Denmark) Signe Brun
- (Norway) Benedicte Thomassen

Wingers
LW

- (Denmark) Ann Grete Nørgaard Østerballe

RW

- (Denmark) Simone Böhme
- (Denmark) Louise Lyksborg
- (Denmark) Ditte Kelså

Line players

- (Denmark) Kirsten Balle
- (Denmark) Sille Thomsen
- (Denmark) Mathilde Storgaard

Back players
LB

- (Denmark) Rikke Skov
- (Denmark) Sarah Paulsen

CB

- (Norway) Siri Seglem
- (Denmark) Line Uno
- (Hungary) Barbara Bognár

RB

- (Denmark) Nikoline Lundgreen
- (Denmark) Sidsel Bodholt Nielsen
- (France) Marie-Paule Gnabouyou

Squad for the 2014–15 season

Goalkeepers

- (Denmark) Rikke Poulsen
- (Brazil) Chana Masson

Wingers
LW

- (Denmark) Sarah Andreasen
- (Denmark) Henriette Mikkelsen
- (Denmark) Maria Fisker

RW

- (Denmark) Louise Lyksborg

Line players

- (Denmark) Kirsten Balle
- (Denmark) Sille Thomsen
- (Denmark) Mette Gravholt
- (Denmark) Cecilie Dalmose

Back players
LB

- (Denmark) Rikke Skov
- (Denmark) Mette Thyrsted
- (Serbia) Sanja Damnjanović

CB

- (Sweden) Isabelle Gulldén
- (Netherlands) Maura Visser
- (Denmark) Sarah Paulsen

RB

- (Denmark) Nikoline Lundgreen
- (Denmark) Louise Burgaard

Squad for the 2013–14 season

Goalkeepers

- (France) Cléopâtre Darleux
- (Brazil) Chana Masson

Wingers
LW

- (Norway) Anne Kjersti Suvdal
- (Denmark) Henriette Mikkelsen
- (Denmark) Maria Fisker

RW

- (Denmark) Louise Lyksborg

Line players

- (Sweden) Kristina Flognman
- (Denmark) Sabine Pedersen
- (Norway) Marit Malm Frafjord

Back players
LB

- (Sweden) Linnea Torstenson
- (Denmark) Rikke Skov
- (Denmark) Mette Thyrsted
- (Serbia) Sanja Damnjanović

CB

- (Sweden) Isabelle Gulldén
- (Tunisia) Mouna Chebbah
- (Denmark) Sarah Paulsen

RB

- (Norway) Amanda Kurtović
- (Denmark) Louise Burgaard

Squad for the 2012–13 season

Goalkeepers

- (France) Cléopâtre Darleux
- (Sweden) Cecilia Grubbström
- (Denmark) Søs Søby

Wingers
LW

- (United Kingdom) Holly Lam-Moores
- (Denmark) Maria Fisker

RW

- (Denmark) Johanne Andersen
- (Denmark) Louise Lyksborg

Line players

- (Denmark) Sabine Pedersen
- (Norway) Marit Malm Frafjord

Back players
LB

- (Denmark) Pernille Larsen
- (Denmark) Rikke Skov
- (Hungary) Anita Bulath
- (Denmark) Emily Baunsgaard

CB

- (Sweden) Johanna Ahlm
- (Sweden) Isabelle Gulldén
- (Tunisia) Mouna Chebbah

RB

- (Norway) Amanda Kurtović
- (Denmark) Louise Burgaard

Squad for the 2011–12 season

Goalkeepers

- (Denmark) Christina Pedersen
- (Denmark) Louise Bager Due

Wingers
LW

- (Denmark) Henriette Mikkelsen
- (Denmark) Maria Fisker

RW

- (Romania) Cristina Varzaru
- (Denmark) Camilla Mikkelsen

Line players

- (Germany) Anja Althaus
- (Denmark) Mathilde Kristensen
- (Norway) Marit Malm Frafjord

Back players
LB

- (Denmark) Pernille Larsen
- (Denmark) Rikke Skov
- (Denmark) Emily Baunsgaard

CB

- (Sweden) Johanna Ahlm
- (Germany) Caroline Müller
- (Sweden) Isabelle Gulldén
- (Tunisia) Mouna Chebbah

RB

- (Germany) Grit Jurack
- (Denmark) Julie Aagaard
- (Denmark) Anne Cecilie de la Cour

Squad for the 2010–11 season

Goalkeepers

- (Denmark) Christina Pedersen
- (Denmark) Louise Bager Due
- (Denmark) Maja Torp
- (Denmark) Eva Brix

Wingers
LW

- (Montenegro) Maja Savić
- (Denmark) Henriette Mikkelsen

RW

- (Romania) Cristina Varzaru
- (Denmark) Camilla Mikkelsen
- (Denmark) Katja Lausen-Marcher

Line players

- (Germany) Anja Althaus
- (Denmark) Mathilde Kristensen
- (Norway) Marit Malm Frafjord

Back players
LB

- (Romania) Carmen Amariei
- (Denmark) Rikke Skov
- (Denmark) Pia Hildebrand
- (Denmark) Line Thorius

CB

- (Sweden) Johanna Ahlm
- (Austria) Gorica Aćimović
- (China) Chao Zhai
- (Tunisia) Mouna Chebbah

RB

- (Germany) Grit Jurack

Squad for the 2009–10 season

Goalkeepers

- (Norway) Katrine Lunde
- (Croatia) Katarina Bralo
- (Denmark) Maja Torp
- (Denmark) Sandra Mittet

Wingers
LW

- (Denmark) Gitte Aaen
- (Denmark) Henriette Mikkelsen

RW

- (Romania) Cristina Varzaru
- (Hungary) Mónika Kovacsicz

Line players

- (Germany) Anja Althaus
- (Denmark) Lene Lund Nielsen
- (Denmark) Dianne Møller
- (Netherlands) Olga Assink
- (Denmark) Karen Smidt

Back players
LB

- (Montenegro) Bojana Popović
- (Denmark) Rikke Skov
- (Norway) Kristine Lunde

CB

- (Sweden) Johanna Ahlm
- (Austria) Gorica Aćimović
- (China) Chao Zhai

RB

- (Germany) Grit Jurack
- (Germany) Nora Reiche

Squad for the 2008–09 season

Goalkeepers

- (Norway) Katrine Lunde
- (Denmark) Louise Bager Nørgaard
- (Denmark) Maja Torp

Wingers
LW

- (Denmark) Ann Grete Nørgaard Østerballe
- (Denmark) Gitte Aaen
- (Denmark) Henriette Mikkelsen
- (Denmark) Maria Fisker

RW

- (Romania) Cristina Varzaru
- (Hungary) Mónika Kovacsicz
- (Denmark) Camilla Mikkelsen

Line players

- (Germany) Anja Althaus
- (Denmark) Lene Lund Nielsen
- (Denmark) Karen Smidt

Back players
LB

- (Montenegro) Bojana Popović
- (Norway) Kristine Lunde

CB

- (Denmark) Rikke Skov
- (China) Chao Zhai

RB

- (Germany) Grit Jurack
- (Norway) Ida Bjørndalen
- (Germany) Nora Reiche
- (Denmark) Kamilla Haagensen

Squad for the 2007–08 season

Goalkeepers

- (Norway) Katrine Lunde
- (Denmark) Louise Bager Nørgaard
- (Denmark) Marianne Lundsby
- (France) Aurélie Rouqette

Wingers
LW

- (Denmark) Christina Roslyng
- (Denmark) Gitte Aaen
- (Denmark) Henriette Mikkelsen
- (Denmark) Maria Fisker

RW

- (Romania) Cristina Varzaru
- (Denmark) Lina Rask
- (Denmark) Camilla Mikkelsen

Line players

- (Germany) Anja Althaus
- (Denmark) Stina Eriksen
- (Denmark) Stine Bodholt Nielsen

Back players
LB

- (Montenegro) Bojana Popović
- (Denmark) Lene Thomsen
- (Norway) Kristine Lunde
- (Denmark) Sidsel Bodholt Nielsen

CB

- (Denmark) Rikke Skov
- (Denmark) Jane Schumacher

RB

- (Germany) Grit Jurack
- (Norway) Ida Bjørndalen
- (Germany) Nora Reiche

Squad for the 2006–07 season

Goalkeepers

- (Denmark) Marie Staun
- (Denmark) Louise Bager Nørgaard
- (France) Valérie Nicolas

Wingers
LW

- (Denmark) Gitte Aaen
- (Denmark) Henriette Mikkelsen

RW

- (Romania) Cristina Varzaru
- (Denmark) Kristina Bille
- (Denmark) Lina Rask

Line players

- (Denmark) Stine Bodholt Nielsen
- (Denmark) Stina Eriksen
- (Denmark) Charlotte Højfeldt
- (Denmark) Lene Lund Nielsen

Back players
LB

- (Spain) Isabel Ortuño
- (Denmark) Rikke Skov
- (Denmark) Lene Thomsen

CB

- (Denmark) Heidi Astrup
- (China) Chao Zhai
- (Denmark) Trine Troelsen
- (Denmark) Jane Schumacher

RB

- (Germany) Grit Jurack

Squad for the 2005–06 season

Goalkeepers

- (Denmark) Marie Staun
- (Denmark) Louise Bager Nørgaard
- (France) Valérie Nicolas

Wingers
LW

- (Denmark) Ann Grete Nørgaard Østerballe
- (Denmark) Sanne Bak Pedersen
- (Denmark) Henriette Mikkelsen

RW

- (Romania) Cristina Varzaru
- (Denmark) Kristina Bille

Line players

- (Netherlands) Olga Assink
- (Denmark) Charlotte Højfeldt
- (Denmark) Lene Lund Nielsen

Back players
LB

- (Spain) Isabel Ortuño
- (Denmark) Rikke Skov
- (Denmark) Lene Thomsen

CB

- (Denmark) Heidi Astrup
- (China) Chao Zhai
- (Denmark) Trine Troelsen

RB

- (Germany) Grit Jurack

Squad for the 2004–05 season

Goalkeepers

- (Denmark) Louise Bager Nørgaard
- (France) Valérie Nicolas

Wingers
LW

- (Norway) Camilla Thorsen
- (Denmark) Ann Grete Nørgaard Østerballe
- (Denmark) Sanne Bak Pedersen
- (Denmark) Henriette Mikkelsen

RW

- (Netherlands) Saskia Mulder
- (Denmark) Kristina Bille

Line players

- (Netherlands) Olga Assink
- (Denmark) Signe Grummedal
- (Denmark) Charlotte Højfeldt
- (Denmark) Camilla Søndergaard

Back players
LB

- (Denmark) Katrine Fruelund
- (Denmark) Rikke Skov
- (Spain) Isabel Ortuño

CB

- (Denmark) Lotte Kiærskou
- (China) Chao Zhai
- (Denmark) Trine Troelsen

RB

- (Germany) Grit Jurack

Squad for the 2003–04 season

Goalkeepers

- (Denmark) Louise Bager Nørgaard
- (France) Valérie Nicolas

Wingers
LW

- (Norway) Camilla Thorsen
- (Denmark) Ann Grete Nørgaard Østerballe
- (Denmark) Sanne Bak Pedersen
- (Denmark) Henriette Mikkelsen

RW

- (Netherlands) Saskia Mulder
- (Denmark) Mari-Ann Laursen
- (Norway) Silje Mari Berget

Line players

- (Denmark) Karen Brødsgaard
- (Denmark) Charlotte Højfeldt
- (Denmark) Camilla Søndergaard

Back players
LB

- (Denmark) Katrine Fruelund
- (Denmark) Rikke Skov
- (France) Leila Duchemann

CB

- (Denmark) Lotte Kiærskou
- (Denmark) Berit Kristensen
- (Denmark) Trine Troelsen

RB

- (Hungary) Helga Németh
- (Netherlands) Natasja Burgers

== Stadium ==
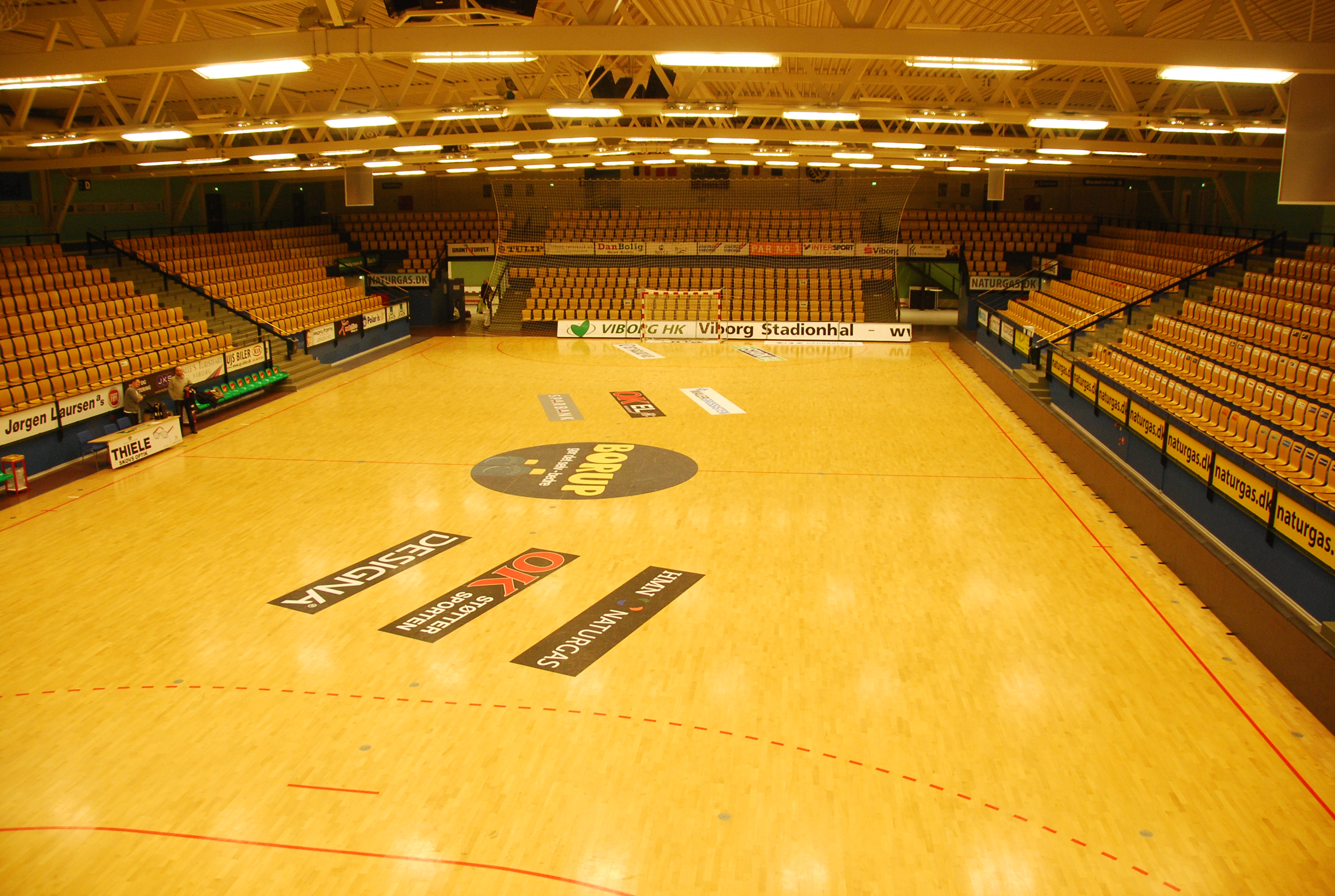
The arena Vibocold Arena Viborg

- Name: Vibocold Arena Viborg
- City: Viborg
- Capacity: 3,000
- Address: Tingvej 5, 8800 Viborg

== Kit manufacturers ==
- (Sweden) Salming Sports
