= Camilla Thorsen =

Norwegian handball player (born 1975)

Personal information
- Full name: Camilla Nordberg Thorsen
- Born: 30 December 1975 (age 50)
- Height: 165 cm (65 in)

Sport
- Sport: Handball
- Position: Left wing

Senior clubs
- Years: Team
- –: Bergkammeraterne
- –: Gjerpen IF
- –: Tertnes HE
- –: Nordnes IL
- 2000-2005: Viborg HK
- 2005-2006: HC Leipzig
- 2006-2008: Ikast-Bording EH
- 2008-2013: Skrim Kongsberg
National team
Years	Team	Apps	(Gls)
1995-2007	Norway	61	(138)
Medal record
Women's handball
Representing Norway
European Championship
Gold medal – first place	2004 Hungary	Team

Camilla Nordberg Thorsen (born 30 December 1975) is a Norwegian team handball player who played for the Norwegian clubs IL Bergkameratene, Gjerpen, Tertnes and Nordnes, the German club HC Leipzig, and the Danish clubs Viborg HK and Ikast-Bording. She retired from top handball in 2008.

Thorsen became European champion with the Norwegian national team in 2004. She also played at the 2005 World Women's Handball Championship, where the team finished 9th.
