= Line Uno =

Danish handball player (born 1993)

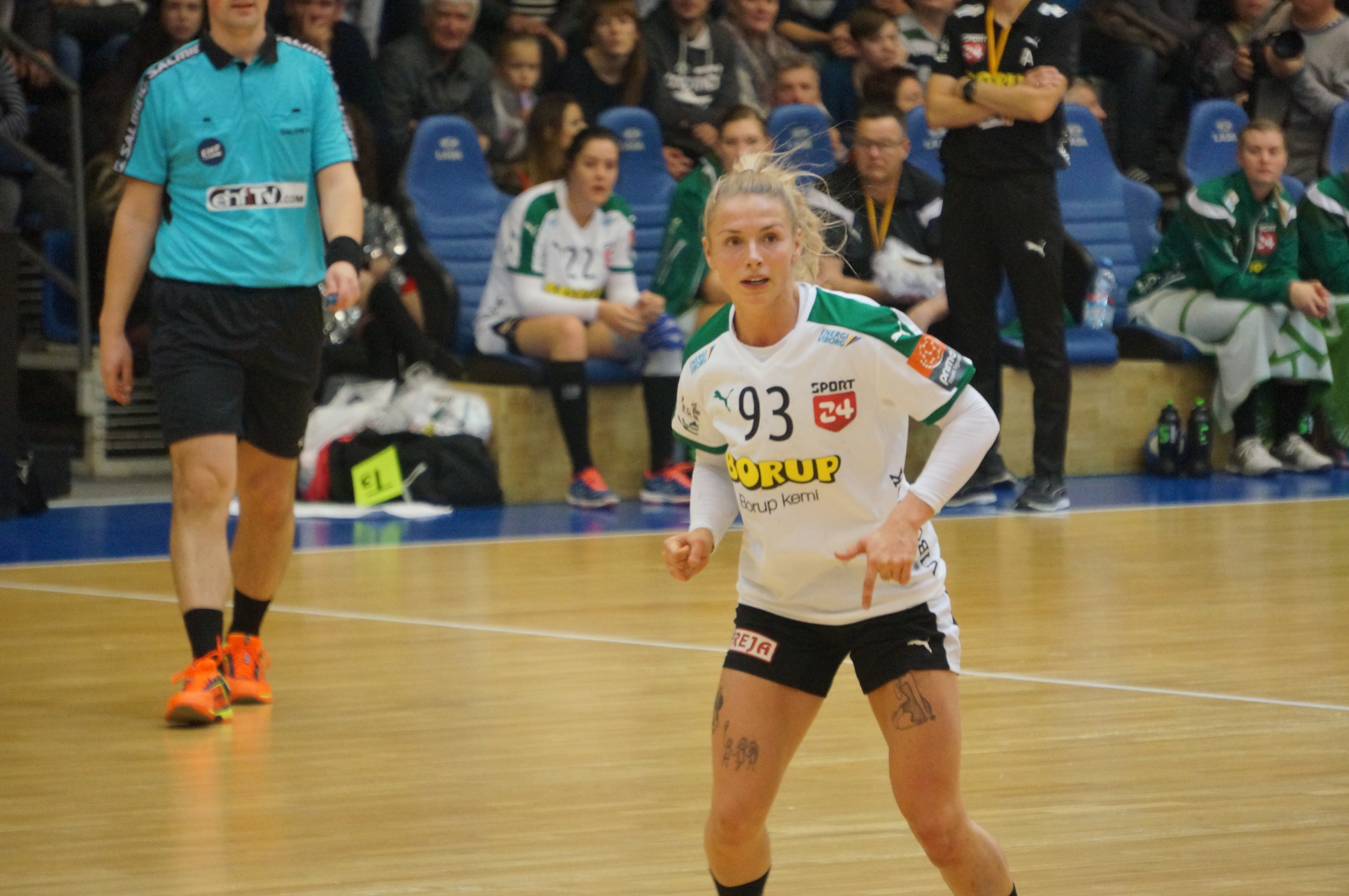

Personal information
- Full name: Line Uno Jensen
- Nationality: Danish
- Born: 19 October 1993 (age 33) Kolding, Denmark

Sport
- Sport: Handball
- Position: Centre Back
- Current club: SønderjyskE Håndbold
- Number: 93

Youth career
- Years: Team
- –: Tarm-Foersum GF

Senior clubs
- Years: Team
- 2010–2013: Tarm-Foersum GF
- 2013–2015: SK Aarhus
- 2015–2019: Viborg HK
- 2019–2022: ESBF Besançon
- 2022–2023: Ikast Håndbold
- 2023–: SønderjyskE Håndbold
National team
Years	Team	Apps	(Gls)
–	Denmark	9	(23)

Line Uno (born 19 October 1993) is a Danish handball player for SønderjyskE Håndbold and the Danish national team. She signed for the Danish top league club in 2023.
