= Marianne Haugsted =

Danish handball player (born 2001)

Personal information
- Full name: Marianne Haugsted
- Nationality: Danish
- Born: 10 January 2001 (age 25) Skive, Denmark
- Height: 1.78 m (5 ft 10 in)

Sport
- Sport: Handball
- Position: Left back
- Current club: Bjerringbro FH
- Number: 31

Youth career
- Years: Team
- 2016-2017: TTH Holstebro
- 2016-2017: FC Midtjylland Håndbold
- 2018-2020: Viborg HK

Senior clubs
- Years: Team
- 2018–2021: Viborg HK
- 2021–2022: Oppsal IF
- 2022–2024: Larvik HK
- 2024–: Bjerringbro FH
National team
Years	Team	Apps	(Gls)
2025–	Denmark Beach	3	(0)
Medal record
Handball
European Youth Olympic Festival
Bronze medal – third place	2017 Győr
Beach handball
World Championships
Silver medal – second place	2026 Croatia
- Updated on 9 January 2026

Marianne Haugsted (born 10 January 2001) is Danish handball player, who plays for Bjerringbro FH in the top Danish division, Damehåndboldligaen.

== Career ==
Haugsted has briefly represented the Denmark women's national beach handball team at the 2025 European Beach Handball Championship in Alanya. She has also made a few appearances on the Danish national youth team, winning bronze at the 2017 European Youth Summer Olympic Festival in Győr.

She started her professional handball career in Viborg HK. In the 2020/21 season, the team won silver in the Damehåndboldligaen. The following season, Haugsted signed a one-year contract with Oppsal IF in Norway. In the first season, Haugsted was the team's topscorer at the end of the season with 134 goals. On 26 April 2022, she signed a two-contract with Larvik HK.

In January 2024, she signed a new contract with Danish Bjerringbro FH.

== Personal life ==
She is the little sister of Danish international Line Haugsted.
