= Cecilia Grubbström =

Swedish handball player (born 1986)

Personal information
- Full name: Cecilia Anna Helene Skagerstam Grubbström
- Nationality: Swedish
- Born: 2 September 1986 (age 40) Partille, Sweden
- Height: 1.78 m (5 ft 10 in)

Sport
- Sport: Handball
- Position: Goalkeeper
- Current club: Retired
- Number: 12

Youth career
- Years: Team
- 1994-2004: IK Sävehof

Senior clubs
- Years: Team
- 2004-2012: IK Sävehof
- 2012: Viborg HK
- 2012-2014: OGC Nice Côte d'Azur Handball
- 2014-2015: Skövde HF
National team
Years	Team	Apps	(Gls)
2009-2015	Sweden	102	(1)
Medal record
European Championship
Silver medal – second place	2010 Denmark/Norway	Team
- Updated on 4 juni 2021

Cecilia Grubbström (born 2 September 1986) is a former Swedish handball goalkeeper. She has played on the Swedish national team. She competed at the 2010 European Women's Handball Championship where the Swedish team placed second, and Grubbström was listed among the top ten goalkeepers of the championship.
