= Anne Kjersti Suvdal =

Norwegian handball player (born 1987)

Personal information
- Nationality: Norwegian
- Born: 30 July 1987 (age 39) Gjøvik, Norway
- Height: 1.62 m (5 ft 4 in)

Sport
- Sport: Handball
- Position: Left wing

Senior clubs
- Years: Team
- 2005–2007: Nordstrand IF
- 2007–2009: Gjerpen IF
- 2009–2013: Nordstrand IF
- 2013–2014: Viborg HK
- 2014–2017: Oppsal
- 2017: Storhamar HE
National team
Years	Team	Apps	(Gls)
2006–2007	Norway	7	(6)
Medal record
Representing Norway
European Championship
Gold medal – first place	2006 Sweden

Anne Kjersti Suvdal (born 30 July 1987) is a former Norwegian handball player who last played for Storhamar HE.

She was a part of the Norwegian squad at the European Championship in 2006, where Norway won gold medals. She was however dropped from the national team shortly after.

In November 2017, after making a comeback for Storhamar HE after giving birth, she ended her career.

== Achievements ==
- European Championship
  - Winner: 2006
