= Maria Stokholm =

Danish handball player (born 1990)

Personal information
- Full name: Maria Fisker Stokholm
- Nationality: Danish
- Born: 3 October 1990 (age 36) Hadsten, Favrskov Municipality
- Height: 1.70 m (5 ft 7 in)

Sport
- Sport: Handball
- Position: Left wing
- Current club: Eiðis Bóltfelag
- Number: 25

Youth career
- Years: Team
- –: Vissing-Hadsten HK
- 2005: Randers HK

Senior clubs
- Years: Team
- –2005: Viborg HK
- 2005–2006: Randers HK
- 2006–2009: Viborg HK
- 2009–2011: Randers HK
- 2011–2015: Viborg HK
- 2015–2016: CSM București
- 2016–2019: Randers HK
- 2019–2026: Viborg HK
- 2026-: Eiðis Bóltfelag
National team
Years	Team	Apps	(Gls)
2010–2021	Denmark	100	(250)
Medal record
World Championship
Bronze medal – third place	2013 Serbia
- Updated on 24 January 2024

Maria Fisker Stokholm (born 3 October 1990) is a Danish handball player for Eiðis Bóltfelag and previously for the Danish national team.

She was given the award of Cetățean de onoare ("Honorary Citizen") of the city of Bucharest in 2016.

== Club career ==
Maria Fisker started playing handball at Vissing-Hadsten HK. In 2005 she signed for Randers HK, but only stayed there for a year before signing for the Danish top club Viborg HK. She debuted for the Viborg team in 2007, 25 days before she turned 17. This made her the third youngest player in the Danish Handball League at the time.

At the 2013 World Championship, she was a part of the Danish team that won bronze medals, breaking a 9-year streak without medals for the Danish team. They beat Poland 30–26.

In 2015 she suffered a concussion that put her on the sidelines for the entire spring season. She had just signed for Romanian club CSM București, where she only played for a season.

She returned to Danish handball to join her former club Randers HK in 2016, where she played for 3 years, before re-joining Viborg HK. In 2019 Viborg HK signed her to replace Ann Grete Nørgaard, who had signed for SCM Ramnicu Valcea.

In 2026 she signed for the Faroese side Eiðis Bóltfelag, where she will also take on the role as assistant coach.

=== National team ===
Fisker made her debut for the Danish national team on 24 September 2010. Her first major international tournament was the 2011 World Championship, where Denmark finished 4th.

Due to am elbow injury she missed to 2012 European Championship.

At the 2013 World Championship, she was a part of the Danish team that won bronze medals, breaking a 9-year streak without medals for the Danish team. They beat Poland 30–26. At this occasion she was chosen as part of the tournament all star team.

At the 2014 European Championship she was once again part of the all star team, despite Denmark finishing 8th.

== Achievements ==
- World Championship:
  - Bronze Medalist: 2013
  - Fourth place: 2011
- Danish Championship:
  - Winner: 2008, 2009, 2014
- Danish Cup:
  - Winner: 2007, 2008, 2012, 2014, 2016
- Danish Super Cup:
  - Winner: 2011
- Romanian Championship:
  - Winner: 2016
- EHF Champions League:
  - Winner: 2009, 2016
- EHF Cup Winners' Cup:
  - Winner: 2014
- EHF Cup:
  - Winner: 2010

== Individual awards ==
- All-Star Left Wing of the World Championship: 2013
- All-Star Left Wing of the European Championship: 2014
- Handball-Planet.com Best Left Wing: 2014
