= Henriette Mikkelsen =

Danish handball player (born 1980)

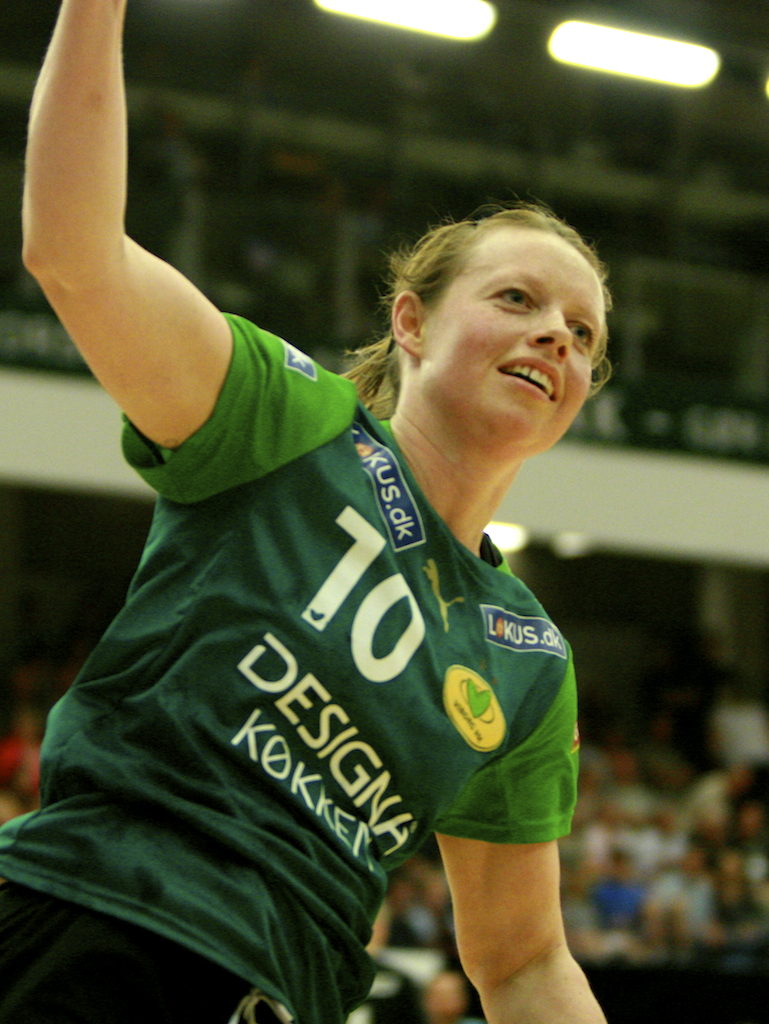

Personal information
- Full name: Henriette Rønde Mikkelsen
- Nationality: Danish
- Born: 21 September 1980 (age 46) Nykøbing Mors, Denmark
- Height: 1.66 m (5 ft 5 in)

Sport
- Sport: Handball
- Position: Left wing
- Number: 17

Senior clubs
- Years: Team
- 1997-2003: Ikast fS
- 2003-2011: Viborg HK
- 2013-2015: Viborg HK
National team
Years	Team	Apps	(Gls)
2002–2008	Denmark	81	(346)
Medal record
Women's handball
Representing Denmark
Olympic Games
Gold medal – first place	2004 Athens	Team
European Championship
Silver medal – second place	2004 Hungary	Team

Henriette Rønde Mikkelsen (born 21 September 1980) is a Danish former team handball player and Olympic champion, and former politician. She won a gold medal with the Danish national team at the 2004 Summer Olympics in Athens.

She won the Champions League three times with Viborg HK: in 2006, in 2009 and in 2010.

Mikkelsen retired in 2011, but made several comebacks afterwards, the latest in 2014. She still plays handball at amateur-level.

At the 2009 Danish local elections she was elected to the Viborg Municipality council for the Social Democrats. She decided to end her term prematurely in 2012, due to wanting to spend more time with her family.
