= Laura Damgaard =

Danish handball player (born 1996)

Personal information
- Full name: Laura Damgaard Lund
- Nationality: Danish
- Born: 16 September 1996 (age 30) Lolland, Denmark
- Height: 1.75 m (5 ft 9 in)

Sport
- Sport: Handball
- Position: Centre back
- Current club: Viborg HK
- Number: 4

Youth career
- Years: Team
- 2006-2013: Horsens HK
- 2013-2015: Skanderborg Håndbold

Senior clubs
- Years: Team
- 2015-2017: Skanderborg Håndbold
- 2017-2019: EH Aalborg
- 2019-2021: Viborg HK
- 2021–2024: HH Elite
National team
| Years | Team | Apps | (Gls) |
| 2020-2021 | Denmark | 15 | (12) |

Laura Damgaard Lund (born 16 September 1996) is a Danish former handballer, who played on the Danish national team.

She made her debut on the Danish national team on 26 November 2020, against Norway.

She represented Denmark at the 2020 European Women's Handball Championship, where Denmark finished 4th.

She retired in 2024.

== Achievements ==
- Danish Championship:
  - Bronze Medalist: 2020

== Individual awards ==
- Top scorer of the Regular season: 2019
- All-Star Best player of the Danish 1st Division: 2017/18
