= Henriette Hansen (handballer) =

Danish handball player (born 1998)

Personal information
- Full name: Henriette Hansen
- Nationality: Danish
- Born: 20 July 1998 (age 28) Esbjerg, Denmark
- Height: 1.78 m (5 ft 10 in)

Sport
- Sport: Handball
- Position: Right wing
- Current club: Viborg HK
- Number: 17

Youth career
- Years: Team
- 2014-2017: FC Midtjylland Håndbold

Senior clubs
- Years: Team
- 2017-2019: Ringkøbing Håndbold
- 2019: Herning-Ikast Håndbold
- 2019-2021: Vendsyssel Håndbold
- 2021-2024: Skanderborg Håndbold
- 2024-: Viborg HK

Henriette Hansen (born 20 July 1998) is a Danish handball player who currently plays for Viborg HK in the Damehåndboldligaen.

On 20 April 2021, it was announced that she had signed a 1-year contract with Skanderborg Håndbold, on a transfer from Vendsyssel Håndbold. In 2022 she took a break from handball to study in Copenhagen. She made a comeback in 2023 for Skanderborg when she was able to move her study to Aarhus. In 2024 she joined Viborg HK on a two-year deal.

== Achievements ==
- Danish Championship:
  - Runners-up: 2019
  - Bronze: 2017
