= Sabine Pedersen =

Danish handball player (born 1986)

Personal information
- Nationality: Danish
- Born: 5 May 1986 (age 40) Aalborg, Denmark
- Height: 1.78 m (5 ft 10 in)

Sport
- Sport: Handball
- Position: Line Player
- Current club: Retired
- Number: 20

Youth career
- Years: Team
- –: Sindal IF

Senior clubs
- Years: Team
- 2005–2010: Frederikshavn HK
- 2010–2012: Aalborg DH
- 2012–2014: Viborg HK
- 2014–2018: Midtjylland Håndbold
- 2018–2020: Randers HK

Sabine Pedersen (born 5 May 1986) is a Danish former handball player.

During her playing career, she played for FC Midtjylland Håndbold, Viborg HK and Aalborg DH. She won the Danish league in 2015 with FC Midtjylland Håndbold.
