= Stine Bodholt =

Danish handball player (born 1989)

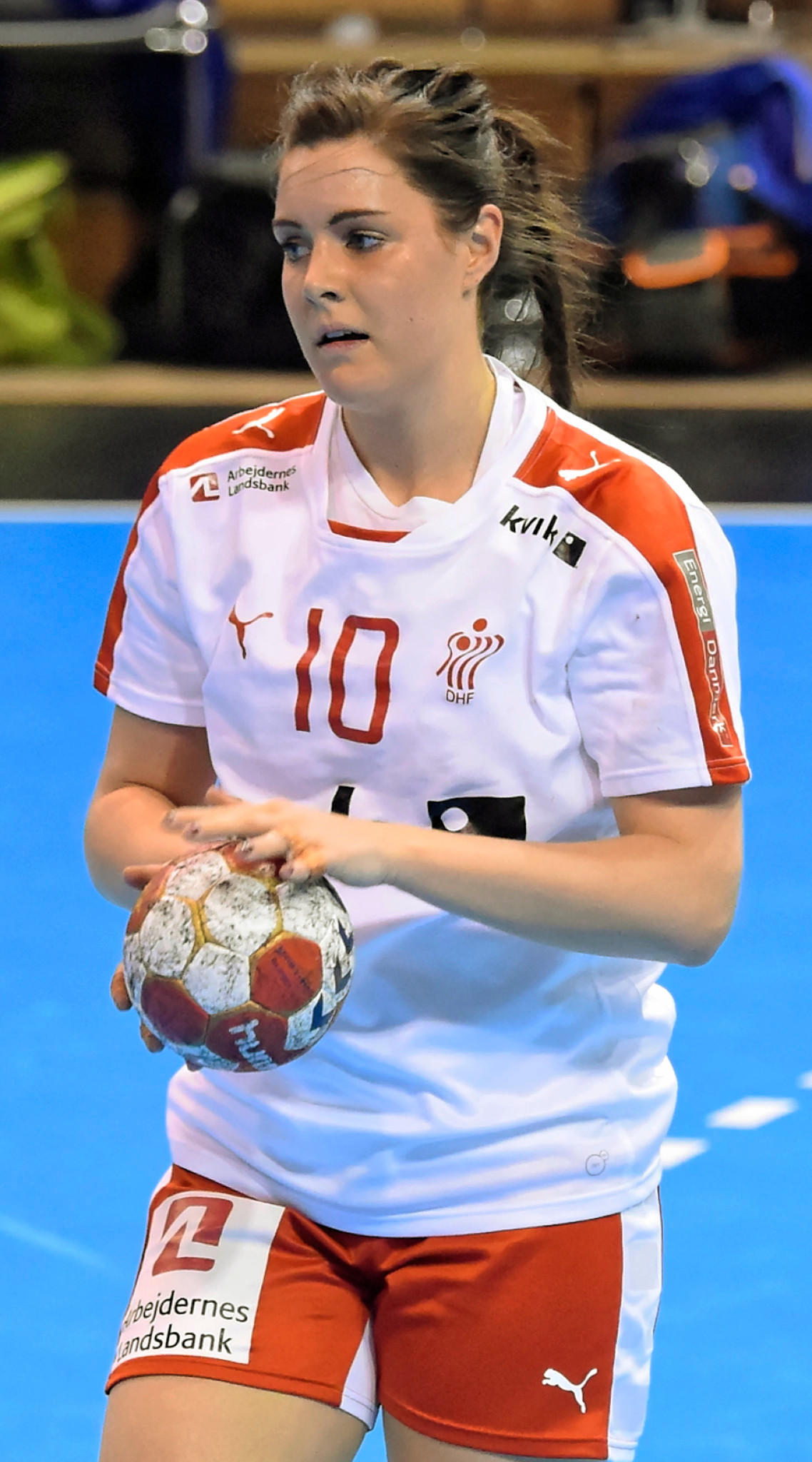

Personal information
- Full name: Stine Bodholt Nielsen
- Nationality: Danish
- Born: 8 November 1989 (age 36) Aabenraa, Denmark
- Height: 1.77 m (5 ft 10 in)

Sport
- Sport: Handball
- Position: Pivot

Senior clubs
- Years: Team
- –2008: Viborg HK
- 2008–2014: Skive fH
- 2014–2016: Team Esbjerg
- 2016–2019: Viborg HK
- 2019–2021: Nantes Handball (France)
- 2021–2024: HH Elite
National team
Years	Team	Apps	(Gls)
2014–2019	Denmark	71	(105)

Stine Bodholt Nielsen (born 8 November 1989) is a Danish handball player for the Danish national team.

She has previously played for Viborg HK, Skive fH and Team Esbjerg in Denmark as well as Nantes Handball in France. She was part of the Team Esbjerg side that won the 2015-16 Damehåndboldligaen, the first national championship in club history. In 2021 she joined HH Elite, where she played until 2024.

She debuted for the Danish national team in 2014 and the year after, she participated in her first major international tournament, the 2015 World Women's Handball Championship in Denmark. She also represented Denmark at the 2016 European Women's Handball Championship.

== Private ==
Her twin sister Sidsel is also a handballer, and they played together at Skive fH.
