= Louise Bak =

Danish handball player (born 2001)

Personal information
- Full name: Louise Bak Jensen
- Nationality: Danish
- Born: 2 October 2001 (age 25) Thisted, Denmark
- Height: 1.80 m (5 ft 11 in)

Sport
- Sport: Handball
- Position: Goalkeeper
- Current club: Viborg HK
- Number: 16

Youth career
- Years: Team
- 2015-2016: Thisted FK
- 2017-2020: FC Midtjylland Håndbold

Senior clubs
- Years: Team
- 2018-2020: Herning-Ikast Håndbold
- 2020–2021: Ringkøbing Håndbold
- 2021–2024: Aarhus United
- 2024–: Viborg HK
National team
Years	Team	Apps	(Gls)
2025–	Denmark	1	(0)

Louise Bak Jensen (born 2 October 2001) is a Danish handball player for Viborg HK and the Danish national team.

She has participated at the 2017 European Women's U-17 Handball Championship, 2018 Women's Youth World Handball Championship and the 2019 European Women's U-19 Handball Championship.

In April 2025, she was first selected to represent Denmark in a tournament. She made her official debut on 12 April 2025 against Germany.
