= Louise Lyksborg =

Danish handball player (born 1988)

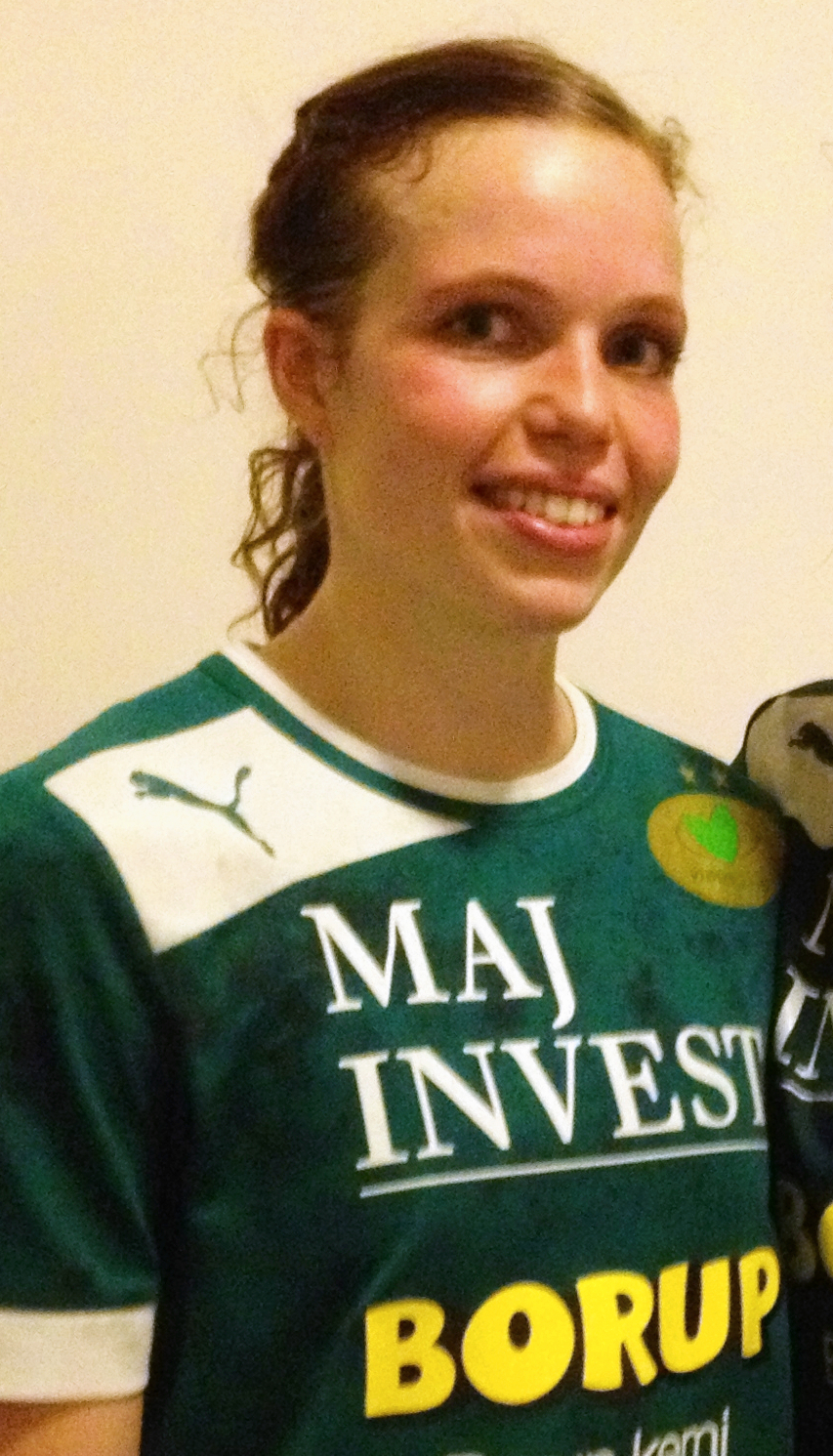

Personal information
- Full name: Louise Knak Lyksborg
- Nationality: Danish
- Born: 17 January 1988 (age 38) Hillerød, Denmark
- Height: 1.68 m (5 ft 6 in)

Sport
- Sport: Handball
- Position: Right wing
- Number: 19

Senior clubs
- Years: Team
- 2005–2006: GOG Svendborg TGI
- 2006–2007: Lyngby HK
- 2007–2010: FCK Håndbold
- 2010–2012: HC Leipzig
- 2012–2016: Viborg HK
- 2016–2019: Silkeborg-Voel KFUM
National team
Years	Team	Apps	(Gls)
2007–2015	Denmark	39	(51)
Medal record
IHF Junior World Championship
Silver medal – second place	2008 Macedonia
IHF Youth World Championship
Gold medal – first place	2006 Canada
European Junior Championship
Gold medal – first place	2007 Turkey
European Youth Championship
Gold medal – first place	2005 Austria
- Updated on 27 October 2019

Louise Knak Lyksborg (born 17 January 1988) is a Danish former handball, who last played for Silkeborg-Voel KFUM and the Danish national team.

She started playing handball at the age of seven in her local club Hillerød HK. In Denmark she played with GOG Håndbold, Lyngby HK and FC København Håndbold, before moving to German club HC Leipzig in 2010 on a two-year deal. The club was at the time led by Danish coach Heine Jensen.

In 2016 she returned to Danish handball to join Silkeborg-Voel KFUM, where she played the rest of her career. She retired in 2019.
