= Rikke Skov =

Danish handball player (born 1980)

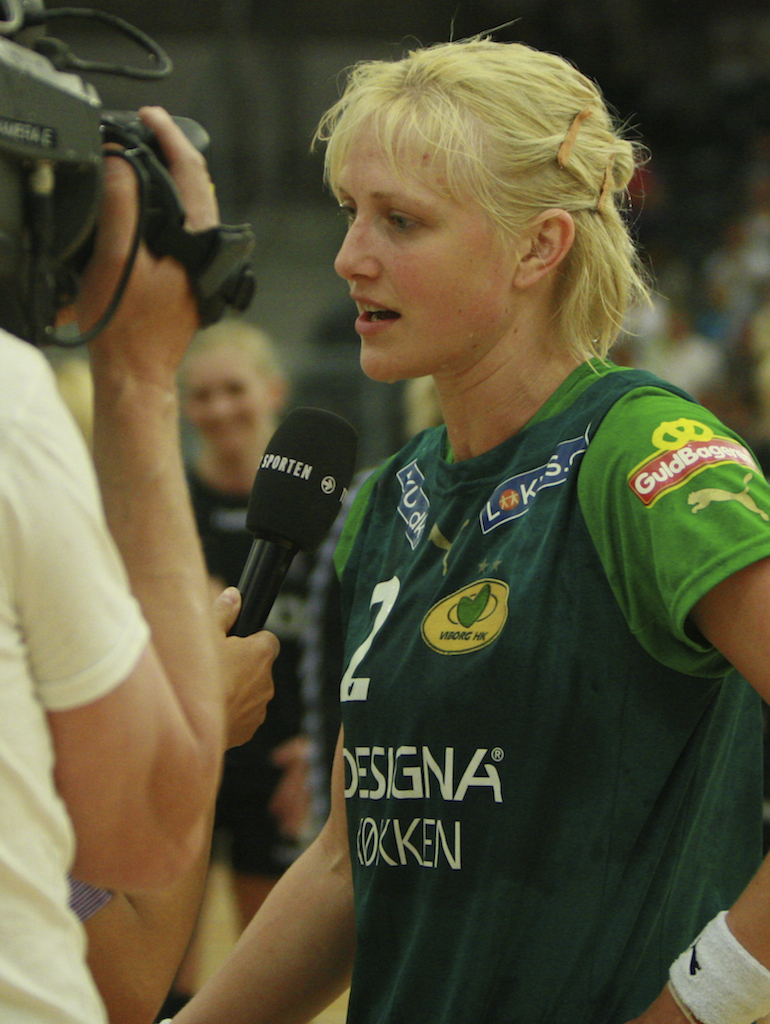

Personal information
- Full name: Rikke Erhardsen Skov
- Nationality: Danish
- Born: 7 September 1980 (age 46) Viborg, Denmark
- Height: 1.81 m (5 ft 11 in)

Sport
- Sport: Handball
- Position: Left back
- Number: 2

Youth career
- Years: Team
- 1994–1998: Viborg HK

Senior clubs
- Years: Team
- 1998–2016: Viborg HK
National team
Years	Team	Apps	(Gls)
2000–2016	Denmark	152	(384)
Medal record
Olympic Games
Gold medal – first place	2004 Athens	Team
European Championship
Silver medal – second place	2004 Hungary
- Updated on 5 November 2023

Rikke Erhardsen Skov (born 7 September 1980) is a Danish former team handball player and Olympic champion. She received a gold medal with the Danish national team at the 2004 Summer Olympics in Athens. A loyal player of Viborg HK, Skov joined the club yet as a teenager in 1994 and it remained her lone team till she retired in 2016 and retired from active sports when she became pregnant in February 2017.

In 2011, she was one of the five handballers, and the only woman who received The EHF Handball Award. The prize was handed out in the 20th anniversary of the European Handball Federation for the players who achieved the biggest successes both in club and international level.

== Club career ==
Skov started her handball career in 1992, aged 12. She played for Overlund GF until she joined Viborg HK in 1994. With Viborg, Skov has won numerous titles, both domestic and European. Her achievements include winning the Champions League in 2006, 2009 and 2010, the EHF Cup in 1999 and 2004, four Danish Cups and seven Danish Championships.

== National team ==
Rikke Skov made her debut with the national team on 28 July 2000, and was appointed team captain in 2007. She received an Olympic gold medal in Athens 2004 and a silver medal at the 2004 European Championship. Skov first retired from international handball in April 2009, until when she played 107 matches and scored 296 goals. However, Skov later changed her mind and participated on the 2010 European Women's Handball Championship, where she reached the fourth place. In 2011, she continued to play for the national team and participated among others on the GF World Cup '11, but before the squad selection for the 2011 World Championship she withdrew from the team to focus fully on her club duties. On Friday 29 April she announced that she ended her national team career.

== Results ==
- Champions League

Winner: 2006, 2009, 2010
Finalist: 2001

- EHF Cup

Winner: 1999 and 2004

- Danish Championship

Gold: 1999, 2000, 2001, 2002, 2004, 2006, 2008, 2009, 2010, 2014
Silver: 2007
Bronze: 2005

- Danish Cup

Winner: 2003, 2006, 2007 and 2008

== Awards ==
- Danish national team player of the year (Danish: Årets Landsholdsspiller) in 2006/07 and 2007/08
- Member of the All Star Team of the Møbelringen Cup 2008
- The EHF Handball Award winner (2011)
- Danish Handball Cup MVP 2005–06, 2014-15

== Personal life ==
Skov met fellow handballer Lotte Kiærskou as teammates for Viborg HK, and "never had any thought to keep their relationship secret." They were in a registered partnership as allowed by Danish law. but split in 2011. Kiærskou, now retired, gave birth to the ex-couple's two daughters.

In 2017, Skov herself gave birth to a daughter fathered by her boyfriend, retired handball player Jakob Borrits Sabra, whom she married in 2018.

In 2005, Skov became a nurse.
