= Hanna Daglund =

Swedish handball player (born 1994)

Personal information
- Nationality: Swedish
- Born: 3 April 1994 (age 32) Västerås, Sweden
- Height: 1.79 m (5 ft 10 in)

Sport
- Sport: Handball
- Position: Goalkeeper
- Current club: Retired
- Number: 3

Senior clubs
- Years: Team
- –2013: VästeråsIrsta HF
- 2013–2017: Skuru IK
- 2017–2019: Viborg HK
National team
Years	Team	Apps	(Gls)
2010-2014	Sweden Youth	70	(1)
- Updated on 25 June 2022

Hanna Karin Daglund (born 3 April 1994) is a former Swedish handball player. She last played for Viborg HK

She began handball in her hometown Västerås and played for VästeråsIrsta HF until 2013. She then attended Skuru IK where she stayed for four years and was defeated three times in the Champions final. In 2017 she left for Denmark and Viborg HK. After injuries with concussions, she stopped playing handball in 2019.

She was playing for the Swedish youth national team and won a gold medal in U-20 World Cup 2012 but never played for Sweden women's national handball team.
