= Pauline Bøgelund =

Danish handball player (born 1996)

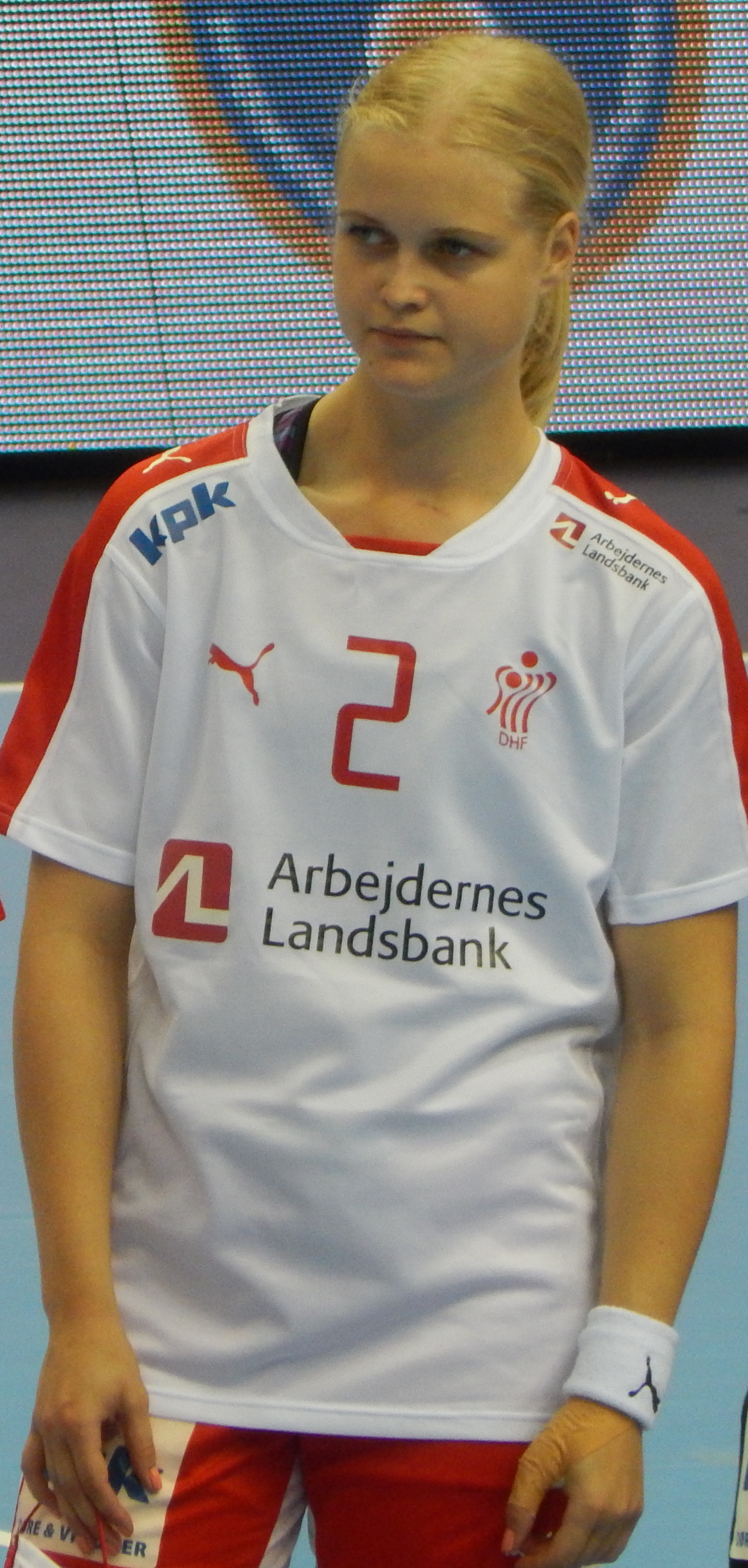

Personal information
- Full name: Pauline Bøgelund
- Nationality: Danish
- Born: 17 February 1996 (age 30) Egedal, Denmark
- Height: 1.74 m (5 ft 9 in)

Sport
- Sport: Handball
- Position: Right back
- Current club: TTH Holstebro
- Number: 2

Youth career
- Years: Team
- –: GOG
- 2013–2015: FC Midtjylland

Senior clubs
- Years: Team
- 2014–2016: FC Midtjylland
- 2016–2018: TTH Holstebro
- 2018–: Viborg HK
National team
Years	Team	Apps	(Gls)
2017–	Denmark	4	(3)
Medal record
IHF Junior World Championship
Gold medal – first place	2016 Russia
IHF Youth World Championship
Bronze medal – third place	2014 Macedonia
European Junior Championship
Gold medal – first place	2015 Spain
European Youth Championship
Bronze medal – third place	2013 Poland

Pauline Bøgelund (born 17 February 1996) is a Danish handball player who plays for Viborg HK. In 2015 she won the Danish League and EHF Cup Winners' Cup with FC Midtjylland Håndbold.

== International honours ==
- EHF Cup Winners' Cup:
  - Winner: 2015
