= Louise Bager Due =

Danish handball player (born 1982)

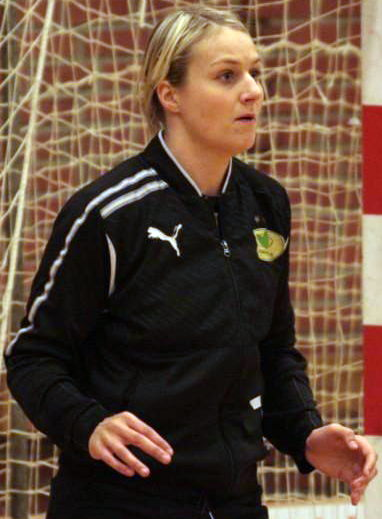
- Bager Due in 2009

Personal information
- Nationality: Danish
- Born: 23 April 1982 (age 44) Dronninglund, Denmark
- Height: 1.83 m (6 ft 0 in)

Sport
- Sport: Handball
- Position: Goalkeeper
- Current club: Retired

Youth career
- Years: Team
- –: Hjallerup IF
- –: LSU Sæby

Senior clubs
- Years: Team
- 2001-2012: Viborg HK
- 2013: Team Tvis Holstebro
- 2017: Viborg HK
National team
Years	Team	Apps	(Gls)
–	Denmark	55	(1)
Medal record
Women's handball
Representing Denmark
Olympic Games
Gold medal – first place	2004 Athens	Team
European Championship
Gold medal – first place	2002 Denmark	Team
Silver medal – second place	2004 Hungary	Team
- Updated on January 2024

Louise Bager Due (née Bager Nørgaard) (born 23 April 1982) is a Danish former handball goalkeeper and Olympic champion. She received a gold medal with the Danish national team at the 2004 Summer Olympics in Athens.

With Viborg, Due has won multiple titles: the Champions League in 2006 and 2009, the EHF Cup in 2004, five Danish Championship golds (2002, 2004, 2006, 2008, 2009) and four times the Danish Cup (2003, 2006, 2007, 2008).

She retired from the national team in 2008 and from handball in general in 2012. She unretired and returned to Viborg HK in 2017.
