= Josephine Nordstrøm Olsen =

Danish handball player (born 1998)

Josephine Nordstrøm
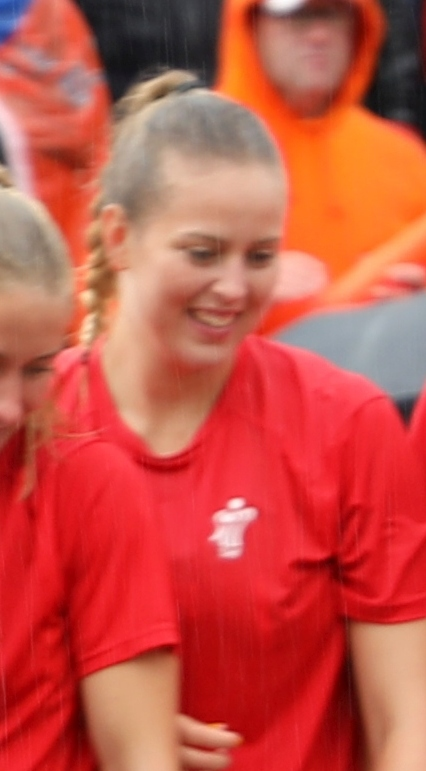

Personal information
- Full name: Josephine Nordstrøm Skov Olsen
- Nationality: Danish
- Born: 7 May 1998 (age 28) Køge, Denmark
- Height: 1.85 m (6 ft 1 in)

Sport
- Sport: Handball
- Position: Goalkeeper
- Current club: Bjerringbro FH
- Number: 24

Youth career
- Years: Team
- 2012-2015: Ajax København

Senior clubs
- Years: Team
- 2015-2017: Midtjylland Håndbold
- 2017-2020: Viborg HK
- 2020-2021: Skövde HF
- 2021-2023: Skuru IK
- 2023-2024: Byåsen HE
- 2024-: Bjerringbro FH
National team
Years	Team	Apps	(Gls)
2017-2018	Denmark junior	11	(0)
2019-	Denmark	10	(0)
Medal record
Women's Team handball
Representing Denmark
European Youth Olympic Festival
Silver medal – second place	2015 Tbilisi
Women's Beach handball
Representing Denmark
European Championship
Gold medal – first place	2019 Stare Jabłonki

Josephine Nordstrøm Olsen (born 7 May 1998) is a Danish handball player and beach handball player for Bjerringbro FH in the Damehåndboldligaen.

She was a part of the Danish team that won the 2019 European Beach Handball Championship.
