= Rikke Poulsen =

Danish handball player (born 1986)

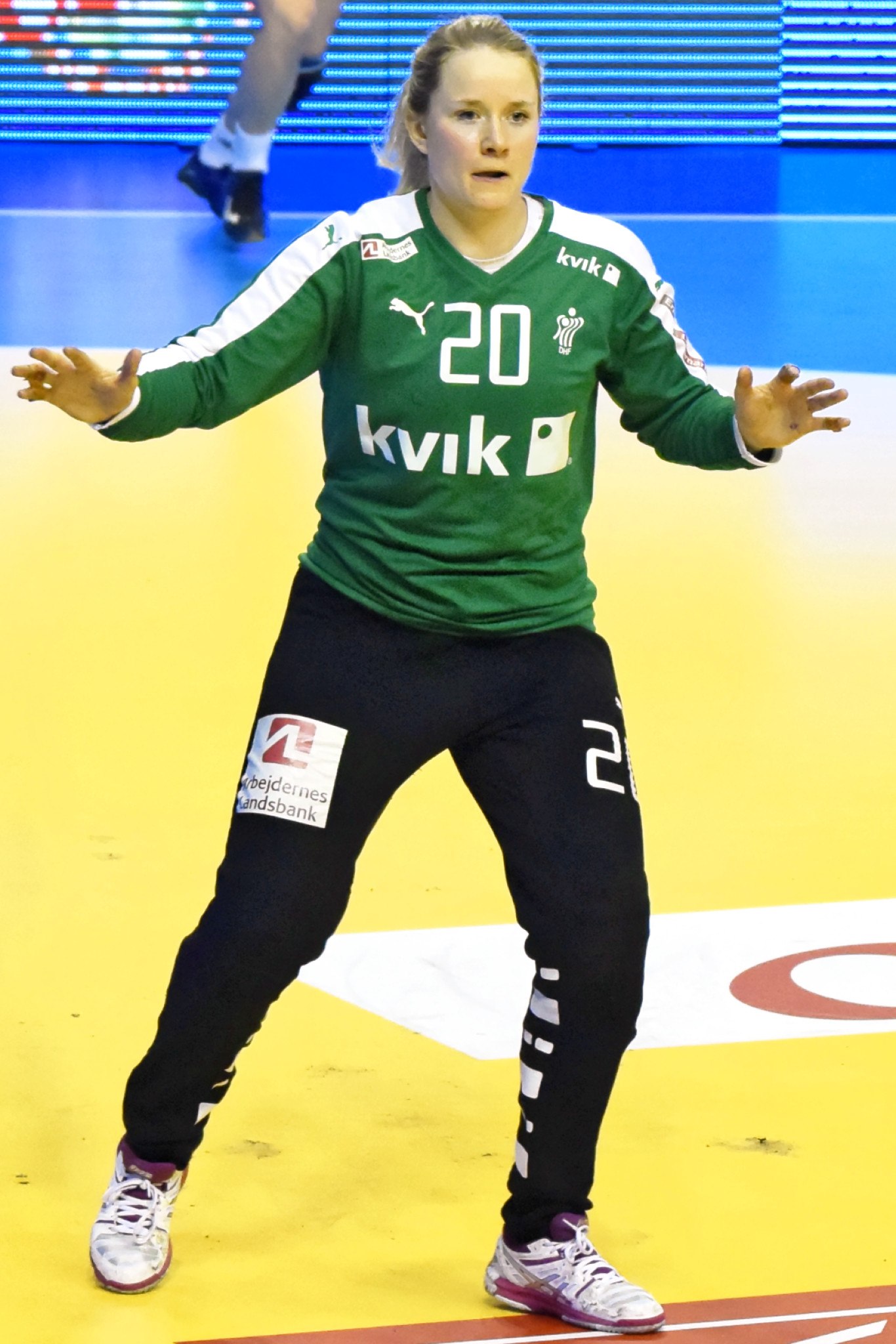

Personal information
- Nationality: Danish
- Born: 20 April 1986 (age 40) Ejsing, Holstebro, Denmark
- Height: 1.73 m (5 ft 8 in)

Sport
- Sport: Handball
- Position: Goalkeeper

Youth career
- Years: Team
- –: Ejsing BK
- –: HH90

Senior clubs
- Years: Team
- 2004–2007: Team Tvis Holstebro
- 2007–2008: GOG Svendborg TGI
- 2008–2012: SK Aarhus
- 2012–2014: KIF Vejen
- 2014–2019: Viborg HK
- 2019–2023: Team Esbjerg
National team
Years	Team	Apps	(Gls)
2007–2016	Denmark	73	(1)

Teams managed
- 2023–: Team Esbjerg (GK coach)
Medal record
World Championship
Bronze medal – third place	2013 Serbia

Rikke Poulsen (born 20 April 1986) is a Danish former handball player and current goalkeeping coach for Team Esbjerg. She represented the Danish national team at the 2013 World Women's Handball Championship in Serbia.

== Career ==
She started playing handball at the age of 4 at her local club Ejsing Boldklub.

At the 2013 World Championship, she was a part of the Danish team that won bronze medals, breaking a 9-year streak without medals for the Danish team. They beat Poland 30–26.

In December 2016 she took a break from handball due to maternity leave.

In the 2019–20 season she won the Danish Championship with Team Esbjerg.

In 2021 she was named the MVP in the Danish Handball Cup when she won the cup with Team Esbjerg.

In November 2021 she announced her retirement at the end of the season, but she was convinced to take one more season. She retired in 2022 to become the goalkeeper coach at Team Esbjerg, where she was tasked with coaching the Danish national team keeper Anna Kristensen and the talent Amalie Milling.
