= Anja Althaus =

German handball player (born 1982)

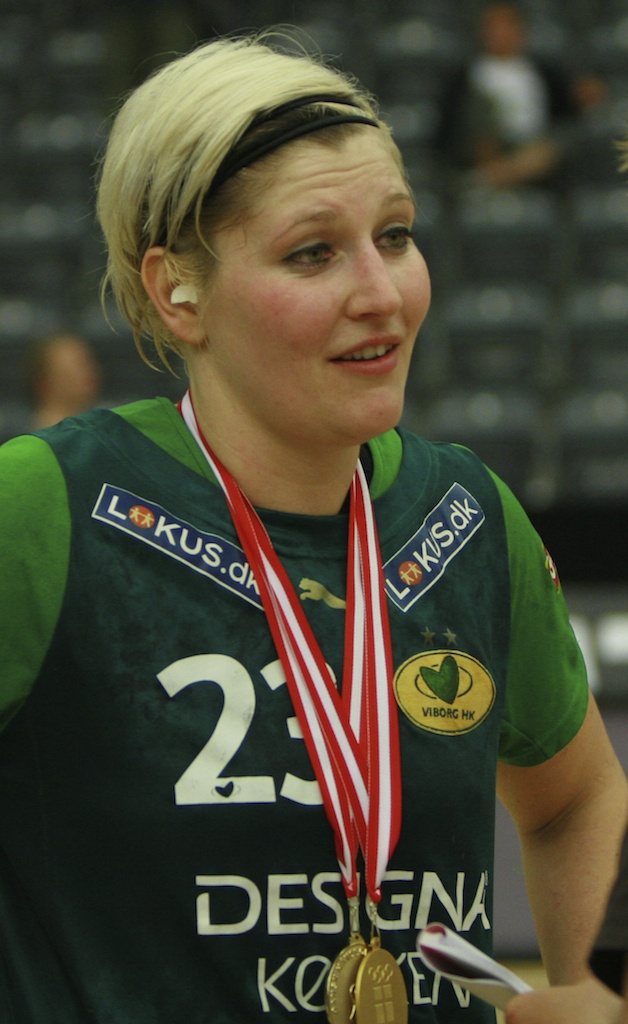

Personal information
- Nationality: German
- Born: 3 September 1982 (age 44) Magdeburg, East Germany
- Height: 1.77 m (5 ft 10 in)

Sport
- Sport: Handball
- Position: Pivot

Youth career
- Years: Team
- 1990–1998: SC Magdeburg

Senior clubs
- Years: Team
- 1998–2000: HC Niederndodeleben
- 2000–2007: DJK/MJC Trier
- 2007–2012: Viborg HK
- 2012–2014: Thüringer HC
- 2014–2017: ŽRK Vardar
- 2017–2018: Győri ETO KC
National team
Years	Team	Apps	(Gls)
2002–2014	Germany	243	(527)

Teams managed
- 2023–: North Macedonia (assistant)
Medal record
World Championship
Bronze medal – third place	2007 France	Team

Anja Althaus (born 3 September 1982) is a retired German handball player who most recently played for Győri ETO KC and formerly was a member of the German national team. She won the Champions League three times in her career (twice with Viborg, once with Győr).

She was included in the European Handball Federation Hall of Fame in 2023.

== Career ==
Althaus made her debut on the German team in 2002. She received a bronze medal at the 2007 World Championship. She competed at the 2008 Summer Olympics in Beijing, where Germany finished 11th.

She announced her retirement from professional handball after the Champions League final in 2017, where HC Vardar fell short to Győri ETO. She changed her mind and a few weeks later signed a contract with Győri ETO. She won the Champions League title, the Hungarian Championship and the Hungarian Cup as well and then she retired from handball in 2018 for good.

== Honours ==
- Bundesliga:
  - Winner: 2003, 2013
- DHB-Pokal:
  - Winner: 2013
- Damehåndboldligaen:
  - Winner: 2008, 2009, 2010
- Danish Cup:
  - Winner: 2007, 2008
- EHF Champions League:
  - Winner: 2009, 2010, 2018
  - Finalist: 2017

== Individual awards ==
- Best Defensive Player of the European Championship: 2012
- EHF Hall of Fame in 2023.
