= Stine Andersen (handballer) =

Danish handball player (born 1993)

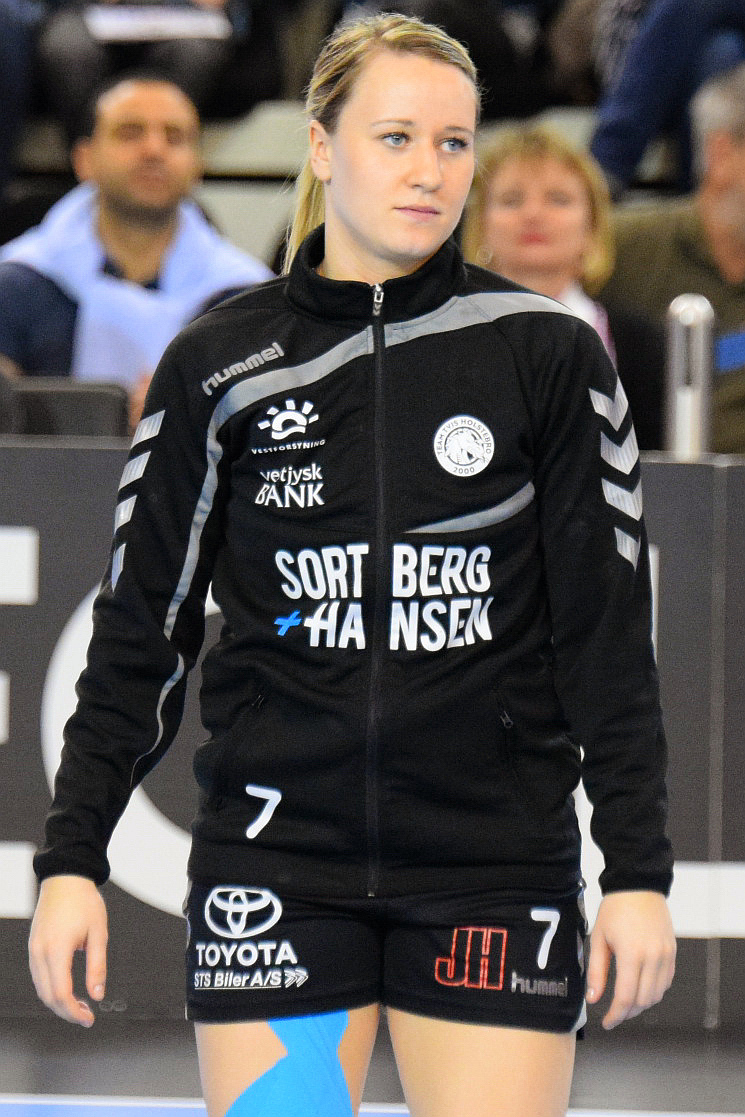

Personal information
- Full name: Stine Andersen
- Nationality: Danish
- Born: 25 March 1993 (age 33) Stige, Denmark
- Height: 1.65 m (5 ft 5 in)

Sport
- Sport: Handball
- Position: Right wing
- Current club: Viborg HK
- Number: 7

Youth career
- Years: Team
- –: Stige HK
- 2009–2012: HC Odense

Senior clubs
- Years: Team
- 2012–2018: Team Tvis Holstebro
- 2018–2022: Viborg HK
National team
Years	Team	Apps	(Gls)
2016	Denmark	2	(3)

Stine Andersen (born 25 March 1993) is a Danish former handball player who played for Viborg HK and Team Tvis Holstebro.

With TTH she won the 2013 and 2015 EHF Cup and the 2016 EHF Cup Winners' Cup. She retired after the 2021-22 season.

She also played two matches for the Danish national team, scoring 3 goals.

== International honours ==
- EHF Cup Winners' Cup:
  - Winner: 2016
- EHF Cup:
  - Winner: 2013, 2015
