= Siri Seglem =

Norwegian handball player (born 1983)

Personal information
- Nationality: Norwegian
- Born: 30 March 1983 (age 43) Sokndal Municipality, Norway
- Height: 1.78 m (5 ft 10 in)

Sport
- Sport: Handball
- Position: Centre Back
- Current club: EH Aalborg
- Number: 13

Senior clubs
- Years: Team
- 2006–2009: Team Esbjerg
- 2009–2013: EH Aalborg
- 2013–2015: HC Odense
- 2015–2017: Viborg HK
- 2017–2018: EH Aalborg
National team
Years	Team	Apps	(Gls)
2006-2013	Norway	23	(31)

Teams managed
- 2018-: EH Aalborg (team leader)
Medal record
World Championship
Bronze medal – third place	2009 China	Team
- Updated on August 2017

Siri Seglem (born 30 March 1983) is a Norwegian handball player. She is currently team leader for EH Aalborg in the Damehåndboldligaen.

She made her debut on the Norwegian national team in 2006, and has played 23 matches and scored 31 goals.

She won a bronze medal at the 2009 World Women's Handball Championship in China.
