= 2017–18 Damehåndboldligaen =

Damehåndboldligaen
- Season: 2017–18
- Champions: København Håndbold (1st title)
- Champions League: København Håndbold; Odense Håndbold
- EHF Cup: Team Esbjerg; FC Midtjylland Håndbold; Nykøbing Falster Håndboldklub; Viborg HK
- Matches: 132
- Goals: 6,613 (50.1 per match)
- Top goalscorer: (Norway) Ida Bjørndalen Karlsson (168 goals)
- Biggest home win: 19 goals: OHC 35–16 AJA
- Biggest away win: 17 goals: OHC 18–35 KBH; RIN 16–33 OHC
- Highest scoring: 71 goals: NFH 36–35 RAN
- All statistics correct as of 27 April 2018.

The 2017–18 Damehåndboldligaen (known as HTH GO Ligaen for sponsorship reasons) was the 82nd season of Damehåndboldligaen, Denmark's premier handball league. Nykøbing Falster Håndboldklub were the defending champions. Following SK Aarhus's bankruptcy, Aarhus United overtook their license and therefore their position in the league.

København Håndbold won their first ever title, when they beat Odense Håndbold in the final. There were no relegated teams, as Ajax København won the relegation play off against SønderjyskE Håndbold.

== Team information ==
Team.	Town	Arena	Capacity
Aarhus United	Aarhus	Ceres Arena Stadionhal	1.200
Ajax København	København	Bavnehøj-Hallen	1.000
FC Midtjylland	Ikast	Ikast-Brande Arena	2.850
København Håndbold	København	Frederiksberghallen	1.468
Nykøbing Falster Håndboldklub	Nykøbing Falster	POWER ARENA	1.300
Odense Håndbold	Odense	Odense Idrætshal	2.256
Randers HK	Randers	Arena Randers	3.000
Ringkøbing Håndbold	Ringkøbing	Rofi-Centret	1.100
Silkeborg-Voel KFUM	Silkeborg	Jysk Arena	3.000
Team Esbjerg	Esbjerg	Blue Water Dokken	2.549
Team Tvis Holstebro	Holstebro	Gråkjær Arena	3.250
Viborg HK	Viborg	Viborg Stadionhal	3.000

== Regular season ==
=== Standings ===
Pos	Team	Pld	W	D	L	GF	GA	GD	Pts	Qualification or relegation
1	København Håndbold	22	17	1	4	618	532	+86	35	Championship play-offs + advance to Champions League
2	Odense Håndbold	22	16	1	5	602	508	+94	33	Championship play-offs
3	FC Midtjylland	22	15	0	7	550	488	+62	30	Championship play-offs
4	Nykøbing F. Håndboldklub	22	13	3	6	623	573	+50	29	Championship play-offs
5	Team Esbjerg	22	14	0	8	559	526	+33	28	Championship play-offs
6	Viborg HK	22	12	3	7	562	516	+46	27	Championship play-offs
7	Silkeborg-Voel KFUM	22	11	2	9	598	573	+25	24	Championship play-offs
8	Randers HK	22	9	2	11	514	516	−2	20	Championship play-offs
9	Team Tvis Holstebro	22	8	2	12	538	578	−40	18	
10	Aarhus United	22	5	2	15	478	547	−69	12	
11	Ringkøbing Håndbold	22	2	1	19	505	616	−111	5	
12	Ajax København	22	1	1	20	466	640	−174	3	Relegation play-off

Updated to match(es) played on 27 March 2018. Source:
Rules for classification: 1.) Points in head-to-head matches amongst tied teams; 2.) Goal difference in head-to-head matches amongst tied teams; 3.) Goals scored in head-to-head matches among tied teams; 4.) Points in all matches; 5.) Goal difference in all matches.

! In the 2017–18 season, no teams will be directly relegated as the league expands to 14 teams from the 2018-19 season. The last placed team of the regular season will play a best of three relegation playoff against 1. division's third-placed team (as both the winner and the runner-up of 1. division will be automatically promoted to the 2018–19 Damehåndboldligaen). Like the men's league, the championship play-offs will include 8 teams.

=== Results ===
In the table below the home teams are listed on the left and the away teams along the top.

Home \ Away	AAR	AJA	FCM	KBH	NFH	OHC	RHK	RIN	SIL	ESB	TTH	VHK
Aarhus United		19–17	19–25	23–29	20–31	22–23	21–24	24–20	32–26	16–26	19–22	24–25
Ajax København	20–30		22–31	23–34	27–39	23–33	21–28	22–27	20–24	19–26	27–26	20–27
FC Midtjylland	32–18	38–22		24–21	26–22	24–17	28–22	34–29	23–26	22–25	32–26	34–25
København Håndbold	31–20	33–28	23–21		27–24	24–24	25–32	38–26	26–21	24–23	33–32	26–17
Nykøbing Falster Håndbold	36–21	36–24	26–19	23–31		28–27	36–35	31–21	28–25	26–23	25–25	30–30
Odense Håndbold	24–18	35–16	17–24	18–35	28–31		30–20	31–22	25–24	33–23	36–24	30–29
Randers HK	19–19	31–16	20–22	28–26	29–23	20–23		21–20	29–29	19–22	23–24	21–25
Ringkøbing Håndbold	22–22	26–19	19–22	28–30	21–28	16–33	20–21		25–26	22–29	22–36	15–21
Silkeborg-Voel	29–26	30–22	27–16	26–30	31–27	23–31	26–23	35–27		23–24	25–26	25–25
Team Esbjerg	30–24	30–27	24–19	27–23	24–26	18–27	23–18	29–27	27–34		26–20	24–27
TTH Holstebro	19–25	24–15	21–32	28–20	26–26	19–28	18–21	29–26	36–33	22–35		23–36
Viborg HK	17–16	22–22	23–20	26–29	33–21	25–29	19–20	35–24	25–30	28–21	22–12	

Legend: Blue = home team win; Yellow = draw; Red = away team win.

== Championship playoffs ==
=== Group 1 ===
Pos	Team	Pld	W	D	L	GF	GA	GD	Pts	Qualification	KBH	ESB	NFH	RAN
1	København Håndbold	6	5	0	1	167	140	+27	12	Advance to semi-finals	—	25–26	31–26	28–16
2	Team Esbjerg	6	4	0	2	161	151	+10	8	Advance to semi-finals	28–30	—	28–23	30–25
3	Nykøbing Falster Håndboldklub	6	3	0	3	150	153	−3	7		22–23	28–27	—	24–19
4	Randers HK	6	0	0	6	127	161	−34	0		22–30	20–22	25–27	—

Updated to match(es) played on 28 April 2018. Source: DHF
Rules for classification: See Tiebreakers

=== Group 2 ===
Pos	Team	Pld	W	D	L	GF	GA	GD	Pts	Qualification	OHC	VHK	FCM	SIL
1	Odense Håndbold	6	5	1	0	171	135	+36	13	Advance to semi-finals	—	25–20	31–22	32–21
2	Viborg HK	6	3	0	3	156	148	+8	6	Advance to semi-finals	24–29	—	26–29	30–18
3	FC Midtjylland	6	2	0	4	140	150	−10	5		21–27	18–20	—	24–25
4	Silkeborg-Voel	6	1	1	4	141	175	−34	3		27–27	29–36	21–26	—

Updated to match(es) played on 28 April 2018. Source: DHF
Rules for classification: See Tiebreakers

== Championship ==
=== Semi-finals ===
Date			Home team in the 1st match & 3rd match	Home team in the 2nd match	Results		
1st match	2nd match	3rd match	Home team in the 1st match & 3rd match	Home team in the 2nd match	1st match	2nd match	3rd match
5 May	8 May	12 May	København Håndbold	Viborg HK	18–24	25–31	27–26
5 May	8 May	12 May	Odense Håndbold	Team Esbjerg	20–27	21–24	32–23

! Best of three matches. In the case of a tie after the second match, a third match is played. Highest ranking team in the regular season has the home advantage in the first and possible third match.

=== 3rd place ===
Date			Home team in the 1st match & 3rd match	Home team in the 2nd match	Results		
1st match	2nd match	3rd match	Home team in the 1st match & 3rd match	Home team in the 2nd match	1st match	2nd match	3rd match
18 May	22 May	26 May	Viborg HK	Team Esbjerg	19–28	28–26	36–34

! Best of three matches. In the case of a tie after the second match, a third match is played. Highest ranking team in the regular season has the home advantage in the first and possible third match.

=== Final ===
Date			Home team in the 1st match & 3rd match	Home team in the 2nd match	Results		
1st match	2nd match	3rd match	Home team in the 1st match & 3rd match	Home team in the 2nd match	1st match	2nd match	3rd match
19 May	22 May	27 May	København Håndbold	Odense Håndbold	28–25	22–29	26–25

! Best of three matches. In the case of a tie after the second match, a third match is played. Highest ranking team in the regular season has the home advantage in the first and possible third match.

== Relegation playoff ==
! Best of three matches. In the case of a tie after the second match, a third match is played. Highest ranking team in the regular season has the home advantage in the first and possible third match.

Date			Home team in the 1st match & 3rd match	Home team in the 2nd match	Results		
1st match	2nd match	3rd match	Home team in the 1st match & 3rd match	Home team in the 2nd match	1st match	2nd match	3rd match
21 April	25 April	28 April	Ajax København	SønderjyskE	21–23	22–35	38–26

== Top goalscorers ==
As of matches played on 21 April 2018

=== Regular season ===
Rank	Player	Club	Goals
1	(Denmark) Sofie Bæk Andersen	Silkeborg-Voel KFUM	131
2	(Denmark) Stine Jørgensen	Odense Håndbold	126
3	(Norway) Stine Skogrand	Silkeborg-Voel KFUM	122
4	(Norway) Veronica Kristiansen	FC Midtjylland	121
5	(Denmark) Ann Grete Nørgaard	Viborg HK	119
6	(Norway) Ida Bjørndalen	Team Esbjerg	118
7	(Denmark) Mia Rej	København Håndbold	111
8	(Sweden) Johanna Westberg	Nykøbing Falster Håndboldklub	97
9	(Denmark) Sarah Iversen	Nykøbing Falster Håndboldklub	95
10	(Denmark) Kristina Kristiansen	Nykøbing Falster Håndboldklub	93

=== Overall ===
Rank	Player	Club	Goals
1	(Norway) Ida Bjørndalen	Team Esbjerg	168
2	(Denmark) Stine Jørgensen	Odense Håndbold	164
3	(Denmark) Sofie Bæk Andersen	Silkeborg-Voel KFUM	163
3	(Norway) Veronica Kristiansen	FC Midtjylland	163
3	(Denmark) Ann Grete Nørgaard	Viborg HK	163
6	(Norway) Stine Skogrand	Silkeborg-Voel KFUM	160
7	(Denmark) Mia Rej	København Håndbold	159
8	(Sweden) Johanna Westberg	Nykøbing Falster Håndboldklub	149
9	(Denmark) Line Uno	Viborg HK	128
10	(Denmark) Kristina Jørgensen	Viborg HK	124

=== Monthly awards ===
Month	Player of the Month	
Month	Player	Club
September	(Denmark) Natasja Clausen	Ringkøbing
October	(Denmark) Maria Fisker	Randers
November	(Denmark) Mia Rej	København
Januar	(Denmark) Louise Burgaard	Midtjyllland
February	(Denmark) Line Uno	Viborg
March	(Denmark) Annette Jensen	Holstebro
April	(Denmark) Kathrine Heindahl	Odense

=== Coach of the season ===
(Denmark) Jesper Jensen - Team Esbjerg
