= Mathilde Storgaard =

Danish handball player (born 1995)

Personal information
- Full name: Mathilde Keis Storgaard
- Nationality: Danish
- Born: 13 February 1995 (age 31) Køge, Denmark
- Height: 1.81 m (5 ft 11 in)

Sport
- Sport: Handball
- Position: Line player
- Current club: Skanderborg Håndbold
- Number: 9

Youth career
- Years: Team
- 2012-2013: Ajax København

Senior clubs
- Years: Team
- 2013-2015: Ajax København
- 2015-2018: Viborg HK
- 2018-2020: EH Aalborg
- 2020-: Skanderborg Håndbold
Medal record
IHF Youth World Championship
Gold medal – first place	2012 Montenegro

Mathilde Keis Storgaard (born 13 February 1995) is a Danish handball player who currently plays for Skanderborg Håndbold.

== Achievements ==
- EHF Cup:
  - Semifinalist: 2018, 2019
- Danish Cup:
  - Silver Medalist: 2015
  - Bronze Medalist: 2016
