= Emma Navne =

Danish handball player (born 1997)

Personal information
- Full name: Emma Ejrup Navne
- Nationality: Danish
- Born: 18 December 1997 (age 28) Nakskov, Denmark
- Height: 1.76 m (5 ft 9 in)

Sport
- Sport: Handball
- Position: Centre back
- Current club: HØJ Elite
- Number: 15

Youth career
- Years: Team
- 2013-2014: Ajax København
- 2014-2015: Nykøbing Falster HK

Senior clubs
- Years: Team
- 2014-2017: Nykøbing Falster HK
- 2017-2019: TMS Ringsted
- 2019-2022: Lugi HF
- 2022-2025: København Håndbold
- 2025-: HØJ Elite

Emma Ejrup Navne (born 18 December 1997) is a Danish handball player who plays for HØJ Elite in the Danish Damehåndboldligaen.

She started her career for Nykøbing Falster Håndboldklub in 2015, winning the 2016–17 Damehåndboldligaen. The following season, Navne transferred to TMS Ringsted in the Danish 1st Division for two seasons. She has also played for Lugi HF in Sweden and København Håndbold.

For the 2025–26 season, Navne signed a one-year contract with HØJ Elite.

== Achievements ==
- Damehåndboldligaen:
  - Winner: 2017
