= Tollbring =

Tollbring is a surname. Notable people with the surname include:

- Cassandra Tollbring (born 1993), Swedish handball player
- Jerry Tollbring (born 1995), Swedish handball player
