= 2018–19 Damehåndboldligaen =

Damehåndboldligaen
- Season: 2018–19
- Champion: Team Esbjerg
- Relegated: Ringkøbing Håndbold
- Champions League: Team Esbjerg
- EHF Cup: Odense Håndbold; Herning-Ikast Håndbold; Nykøbing Falster HK; København Håndbold
- Matches played: 182
- Goals scored: 9,118 (50.1 per match)
- Top goalscorer: (Netherlands) Estavana Polman (219 goals)
- Biggest home win: 21 goals: NFH 34–13 EHA (2 Sep); ESB 35–14 AJA (26 Oct)
- Biggest away win: 13 goals: SKA 22–35 ESB (15 Sep); EHA 22–35 ESB (16 Jan); TTH 23–36 ESB (13 Feb)
- Highest scoring: 70 goals: NFH 30–40 KBH (6 Mar)
- All statistics correct as of 24 May 2019.

The 2018–19 Damehåndboldligaen (known as HTH GO Ligaen for sponsorship reasons) was the 83rd season of Damehåndboldligaen, Denmark's premier handball league. For the first time ever, the league features 14 teams, expanded from the usual 12 teams, it had been before.

Team Esbjerg the championship after beating Herning-Ikast Håndbold in the final. Odense Håndbold won the regular season. Ringkøbing Håndbold were relegated, as they fininished last in the regular season.

== Team information ==
Locations of the 2018–19 Damehåndboldligaen

Team.	Town	Arena	Capacity
Aarhus United	Aarhus	Ceres Arena Stadionhal	1.200
Ajax København	København	Bavnehøj-Hallen	1.000
EH Aalborg	Aalborg	Nørresundby Idrætscenter	800
Herning-Ikast Håndbold	Ikast	IBF Arena	2.850
København Håndbold	København	Frederiksberghallen	1.468
Nykøbing Falster Håndboldklub	Nykøbing Falster; Næstved	POWER ARENA; Næstved Arena	1.300; 2,500
Odense Håndbold	Odense	Odense Idrætshal	2.256
Randers HK	Randers	Arena Randers; Ulvehøjhallen	3.000
Ringkøbing Håndbold	Ringkøbing	Rofi-Centret	1.100
Silkeborg-Voel KFUM	Silkeborg	Jysk Arena; Voel-Hallen	3.000
Skanderborg Håndbold	Skanderborg	Skanderborg Fælled	1.700
Team Esbjerg	Esbjerg	Blue Water Dokken	2.549
Team Tvis Holstebro	Holstebro	Gråkjær Arena	3.250
Viborg HK	Viborg	Vibocold Arena Viborg	3.000

== Regular season ==
=== Standings ===
Pos	Team	Pld	W	D	L	GF	GA	GD	Pts	Qualification or relegation
1	Odense Håndbold	26	23	1	2	724	585	+139	47	Championship play-offs + advance to Champions League
2	Team Esbjerg	26	22	0	4	779	603	+176	44	Championship play-offs
3	Herning-Ikast Håndbold	26	19	2	5	684	581	+103	40	Championship play-offs
4	København Håndbold	26	20	0	6	781	647	+134	40	Championship play-offs
5	Nykøbing Falster Håndbold	26	18	1	7	721	630	+91	37	Championship play-offs
6	Aarhus United	26	14	3	9	619	612	+7	31	Championship play-offs
7	Viborg HK	26	12	2	12	674	675	−1	26	Championship play-offs
8	TTH Holstebro	26	9	3	14	653	696	−43	21	Championship play-offs
9	Silkeborg-Voel KFUM	26	9	3	14	646	668	−22	21	
10	Skanderborg Håndbold	26	7	2	17	603	688	−85	16	
11	Ajax København	26	6	2	18	539	639	−100	14	
12	Randers HK	26	7	0	19	590	681	−91	14	
13	EH Aalborg	26	3	1	22	596	716	−120	7	
14	Ringkøbing Håndbold	26	2	2	22	509	697	−188	6	Relegation play-off

Updated to match(es) played on 13 March 2019. Source:
Rules for classification: 1.) Points in head-to-head matches amongst tied teams; 2.) Goal difference in head-to-head matches amongst tied teams; 3.) Goals scored in head-to-head matches among tied teams; 4.) Points in all matches; 5.) Goal difference in all matches.

=== Results ===
Home \ Away	AAR	AJA	EHA	HIH	KBH	NFH	OHC	RHK	RIN	SIL	SKA	ESB	TTH	VHK
Aarhus United		22–22	28–22	18–16	20–28	24–24	25–26	27–25	30–17	25–24	19–14	23–26	25–20	26–24
Ajax København	22–23		22–32	23–26	19–24	20–26	20–26	17–18	17–15	15–15	23–20	22–27	24–23	21–28
EH Aalborg	18–21	20–24		17–22	29–37	21–28	23–31	26–24	23–23	21–24	23–24	22–35	19–23	24–31
Herning-Ikast Håndbold	32–21	29–18	32–21		30–29	24–22	16–18	29–13	28–21	24–21	27–24	23–26	27–26	34–21
København Håndbold	21–27	33–20	32–27	26–29		31–27	24–26	35–18	35–24	29–22	34–21	30–23	37–26	25–32
Nykøbing Falster Håndbold	32–21	30–23	34–13	30–25	30–40		19–25	32–19	29–12	24–23	31–24	21–31	33–32	32–26
Odense Håndbold	24–27	27–17	34–27	31–23	24–19	25–24		34–20	35–22	36–20	33–20	24–23	25–25	28–21
Randers HK	22–23	18–22	22–21	24–26	21–26	23–31	20–28		27–18	31–24	31–28	20–24	23–25	26–21
Ringkøbing Håndbold	21–21	26–24	17–25	18–23	22–25	17–24	18–26	21–18		20–24	23–29	24–29	20–27	19–29
Silkeborg-Voel	25–24	29–23	39–27	22–25	25–33	26–27	22–29	27–26	27–15		31–26	26–28	25–29	28–31
Skanderborg Håndbold	21–19	19–26	22–21	25–25	24–32	24–27	27–28	25–24	28–22	23–27		22–35	27–25	20–24
Team Esbjerg	25–28	35–14	34–25	25–23	28–37	42–27	29–18	33–22	30–12	29–22	29–25		36–22	32–22
TTH Holstebro	26–28	25–22	25–23	23–37	22–26	17–25	27–34	32–26	34–20	22–22	23–23	23–36		24–30
Viborg HK	25–24	23–19	29–28	20–20	31–33	22–32	27–29	26–29	30–22	26–26	26–18	26–29	23–27	

Legend: Blue = home team win; Yellow = draw; Red = away team win.

== Championship playoffs ==
=== Group 1 ===
Pos	Team	Pld	W	D	L	GF	GA	GD	Pts	Qualification	OHC	KBH	NFH	TTH
1	Odense Håndbold	6	4	0	2	160	146	+14	10	Advance to semi-finals	—	19–27	26–21	29–19
2	København Håndbold	6	4	0	2	173	166	+7	9	Advance to semi-finals	32–40	—	29–34	31–25
3	Nykøbing Falster Håndboldklub	6	4	0	2	152	142	+10	8		24–19	26–28	—	27–25
4	TTH Holstebro	6	0	0	6	129	160	−31	0		23–27	22–26	15–20	—

Updated to match(es) played on 22 April 2019. Source: Stillinger
Rules for classification: Placement in the regular season between tied teams.

=== Group 2 ===
Pos	Team	Pld	W	D	L	GF	GA	GD	Pts	Qualification	ESB	AAR	VHK	HIH
1	Team Esbjerg	6	5	0	1	167	146	+21	12	Advance to semi-finals	—	37–30	29–25	28–24
2	Aarhus United	6	2	1	3	146	164	−18	5	Advance to semi-finals	21–26	—	24–24	23–20
3	Viborg HK	6	1	1	4	145	159	−14	3		27–26	26–29	—	21–28
4	Herning-Ikast Håndbold	6	3	0	3	145	134	+11	7		19–21	31–19	23–22	—

Updated to match(es) played on 22 April 2019. Source: Stillinger
Rules for classification: Placement in the regular season between tied teams.

=== Semi-finals ===
Date		Home team in the 1st match	Home team in the 2nd match	Results	
1st match	2nd match	Home team in the 1st match	Home team in the 2nd match	1st match	2nd match
27 April	1 May	Team Esbjerg	København Håndbold	30–25	23–29
27 April	1 May	Odense Håndbold	Herning-Ikast Håndbold	26–28	23–17

! Best of three matches. In the case of a tie after the second match, a third match is played. Highest ranking team in the regular season has the home advantage in the first and possible third match.

=== 3rd place ===
Date			Home team in the 1st match & 3rd match	Home team in the 2nd match	Results		
1st match	2nd match	3rd match	Home team in the 1st match & 3rd match	Home team in the 2nd match	1st match	2nd match	3rd match
14 May	17 May	24 May	København Håndbold	Odense Håndbold	22–16	35-27	24-27

! Best of three matches. In the case of a tie after the second match, a third match is played. Highest ranking team in the regular season has the home advantage in the first and possible third match.

=== Final ===
Date		Home team in the 1st match	Home team in the 2nd match	Results	
1st match	2nd match	Home team in the 1st match	Home team in the 2nd match	1st match	3rd match
18 May	21 May	Team Esbjerg	Herning-Ikast Håndbold	28–20	20-19

! Best of three matches. In the case of a tie after the second match, a third match is played. Highest ranking team in the regular season has the home advantage in the first and possible third match.

== Top goalscorers ==
As of matches played on 1 May 2019

=== Regular season ===
Rank	Player	Club	Goals
1	(Denmark) Laura Damgaard	EH Aalborg	158
2	(Netherlands) Estavana Polman	Team Esbjerg	156
3	(Norway) Helene Gigstad Fauske	Herning-Ikast Håndbold	149
4	(Denmark) Sofie Bæk Andersen	Silkeborg-Voel KFUM	142
5	(Denmark) Lærke Nolsøe	Nykøbing Falster Håndboldklub	116
6	(Denmark) Ida Lagerbon	Ringkøbing Håndbold	112
7	(Denmark) Celine Lundbye Kristiansen	Aarhus United	110
8	(Norway) Vilde Ingstad	Team Esbjerg	108
9	(Denmark) Julie Jensen	EH Aalborg	107
9	(Netherlands) Inger Smits	TTH Holstebro	107

=== Overall ===
Rank	Player	Club	Goals
1	(Netherlands) Estavana Polman	Team Esbjerg	208
2	(Norway) Helene Gigstad Fauske	Herning-Ikast Håndbold	194
3	(Denmark) Laura Damgaard Lund	EH Aalborg	180
4	(Denmark) Sofie Bæk Andersen	Silkeborg-Voel KFUM	159
5	(Denmark) Celine Lundbye Kristiansen	Aarhus United	142
6	(Denmark) Lærke Nolsøe	Nykøbing Falster Håndboldklub	141
7	(Norway) Vilde Ingstad	Team Esbjerg	135
8	(Netherlands) Inger Smits	TTH Holstebro	133
9	(Norway) Marit Røsberg Jacobsen	Team Esbjerg	132
10	(Germany) Susann Müller	Silkeborg-Voel KFUM	129

=== Monthly awards ===
Month	Player of the Month	
Month	Player	Club
September	(Norway) Vilde Ingstad	Team Esbjerg
October	(Netherlands) Estavana Polman	Team Esbjerg
November	(Netherlands) Kelly Dulfer	København Håndbold
January	(Norway) Helene Gigstad Fauske	Herning-Ikast Håndbold
February	(Netherlands) Kelly Dulfer	København Håndbold
March	(Netherlands) Estavana Polman	Team Esbjerg
April	(Germany) Susann Müller	Silkeborg-Voel KFUM

=== All-Star Team ===
The all-star team and awards were announced on 20 May 2019.

=== Coach of the season ===
(Denmark) Jesper Jensen - Team Esbjerg
