= Larissa Nüsser =

Dutch handball player (born 2000)

Personal information
- Nationality: Dutch
- Born: 8 February 2000 (age 26) Born, Netherlands
- Height: 1.75 m (5 ft 9 in)

Sport
- Sport: Handball
- Position: Centre back
- Current club: Gloria Bistrița
- Number: 9

Senior clubs
- Years: Team
- –2014: Beekse Fusie Club
- 2014–2015: HandbaL Venlo
- 2015–2018: Morrenhof Jansen/Dalfsen
- 2018–2021: København Håndbold
- 2021–2024: Odense Håndbold
- 2024–01/2025: Vipers Kristiansand
- 01/2025–: Gloria Bistrița
National team
Years	Team	Apps	(Gls)
2017–	Netherlands	112	(214)
Medal record
World Championship
Gold medal – first place	2019 Japan
European Championship U19
Silver medal – second place	2019 Hungary
- Updated on 13 December 2025

Larissa Nüsser (born 8 February 2000) is a Dutch handball player, who plays for Gloria Bistrița and for the Dutch national team.

She was a part the Netherlands team that won the 2019 World Women's Handball Championship; the first title in the country's history.

== Club career ==
Nüsser started playing handball at her hometown club HV Born and transferred later to BFC Beek. In 2014 she joined the Dutch top league team HandbaL Venlo together with her sister Chiara Nüsser. A year later she joined league rivals SV Dalfsen, where she won the Dutch cup twice and Dutch championship and Dutch supercup once.

In 2018 she joined Danish top league side København Håndbold. In December 2021 she joined league rivals Odense Håndbold to replace the injured Mia Rej. The transfer was a record sale for København Håndbold. With Odense she won the Danish League in 2021 and 2022. The 2021 was the first national championship in club history.

In the summer of 2024 she joined Norwegian Vipers Kristiansand. She would however not play long for them, as the club declared bankruptcy in January 2025. Instead she joined Romanian side Gloria Bistrița.

=== National team ===
Nüsser debuted for the Dutch national team on 28 October 2017, at the age of 17. Her first major international tournament was the 2019 World Championship in Japan, where Netherlands won gold medals, beating Spain in the final 30:29

At the 2020 European Championship she came 6th with the Dutch team. At the 2020 Olympics she was also part of the Dutch team, although she only played a single match.

At the 2021 World Championship she saw more playing time, when she finished 9th with the Dutch team. At the 2023 World Championship she finished 5th with the Dutch team.

== Private life ==
Both her father, Harold Nüsser, and her grandfather Jo Nüsser were handball players. Her father played 150 matches for the Dutch national team, while her grandfather played 222.

Her sister Chiara Nüsser is also a handball player.
