= H 65 Höör =

Swedish handball club

- Full name: Höörs Handbollsklubb H65
- Short name: H65 Höör
- Founded: 1965
- Arena: Björkvikshallen
- Capacity: 600
- President: Karl-Gustav Holmgren
- Head coach: Ola Månsson
- League: Handbollsligan
- 2024-25: 3rd
- Club colours
Home	Away

Höörs HK H 65 is a Swedish women's handball club from Höör established in 1965, competing in the Swedish women's handball league, Handbollsligan, since 2011.

In 2014 the team won the 2013–14 EHF Challenge Cup.

Location of H 65 Höör

== History ==
In 2011–2012, the team accessed to the Elitserien, the highest level in Sweden. In 2012–2013, the team takes part to the playoffs, eliminated by IK Sävehof in semifinals. They also reach the semifinals in the 2012–13 EHF Challenge Cup, beaten by Croatian team, ZRK Fantasyland Samobor. In 2013–2014, they won their first European title, the 2013–14 EHF Challenge Cup, defeating Issy-Paris Hand.

Three years after, they reached the final of the 2016–17 EHF Challenge Cup, where they lost to another Croatian team, HC Lokomotiva Zagreb.

During the 2016–2017 season, the club won the Swedish national women's team handball championship, defeating IK Sävehof, 27–25 in the final game.

== Sports Hall information ==
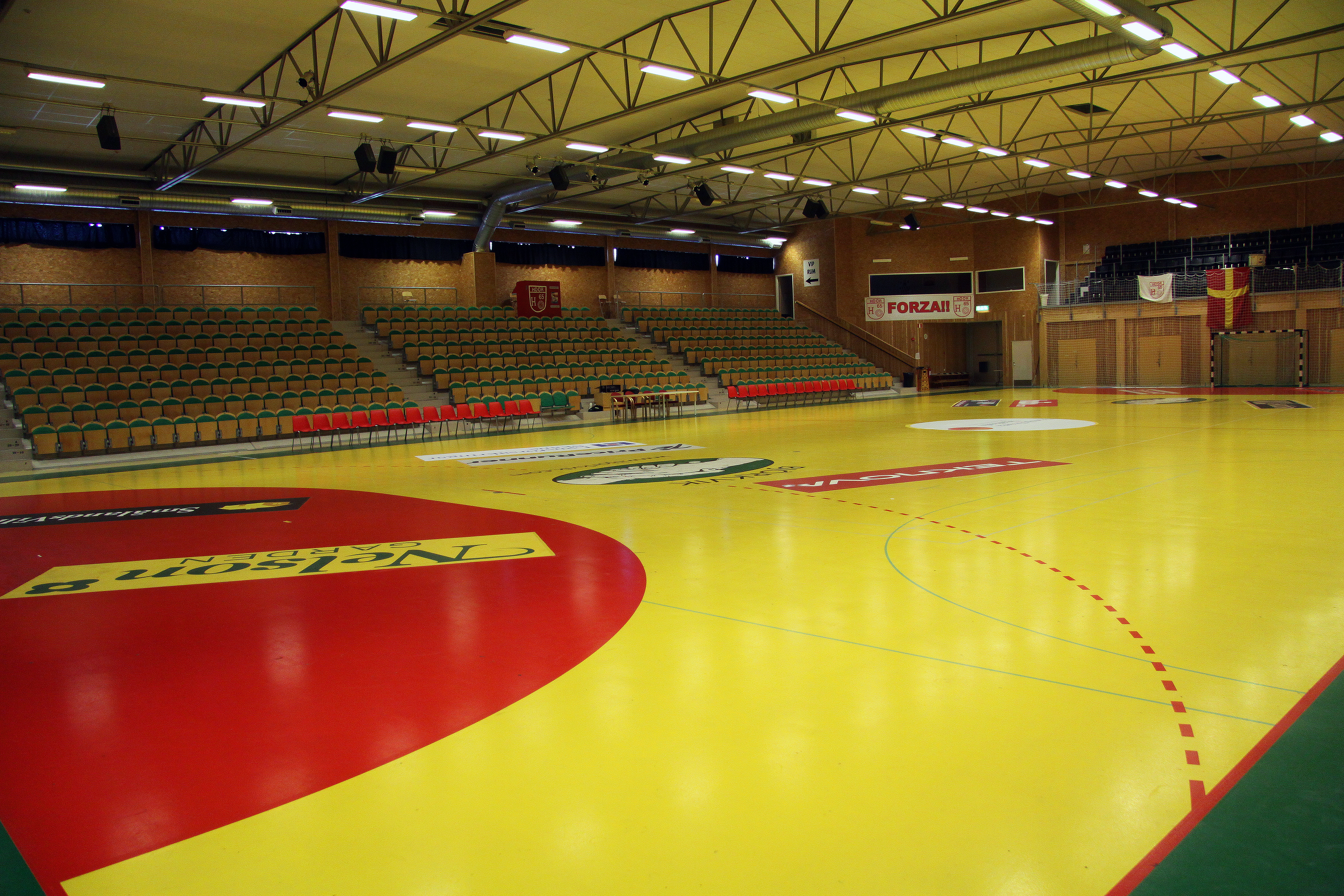
Home hall: Björkvikshallen

- Name: – Björkvikshallen
- City: – Höör
- Capacity: – 600
- Address: – Friluftsvägen 11, 243 30 Höör, Swedish

== Kits ==
HOME
2017-19	2020-

AWAY
2016-18; 2019-	2018-2019

== Titles ==
- Svensk handbollselit:
  - Winner: 2017
  - Runner-Up: 2018, 2021, 2023
- EHF Challenge Cup:
  - Winners: 2014
  - Runner-Up: 2017
  - 1/2 Finalist: 2013
- Swedish Handball Cup:
  - Runner-Up: 2023

== European record ==
Season	Competition	Round	Club	1st leg	2nd leg	Aggregate
2016-17	Challenge Cup	R3	(Spain) Prosetecnisa Zuazo	31–25	20–21	51–46
2016-17	Challenge Cup	1/8	(North Macedonia) HC Vardar SCJS	26–13	26–20	52–33
2016-17	Challenge Cup	1/4	(Spain) Mecalia Atletico Guardes	24–21	29–24	53–45
2016-17	Challenge Cup	1/2	(Czech Republic) DHC Sokol Poruba	28–16	22–14	50–30
2016-17	Challenge Cup	F	(Croatia) HC Lokomotiva Zagreb	19–23	21–24	40–47

== Team ==
=== Current squad ===
Squad for the 2022–23 season

Goalkeepers

- 1 (Sweden) Josefine Hultberg Dahlgren
- 12 (Sweden) Jannike Wiberg
- 16 (Sweden) Gry Bergdahl
- 64 (Sweden) Leila Melcher

Wingers
LW

- 9 (Sweden) Elsa Åberg
- 18 (Sweden) Emely Persson

RW

- 4 (Sweden) Vera Gidebratt
- 5 (Sweden) Johanna Östblom
- 24 (Sweden) Ida Gullberg

Line players

- 3 (Sweden) Alma Skretting
- 6 (Sweden) Filippa Nyman
- 25 (Sweden) Mikaela Fransson

Back players
LB

- 13 (Sweden) Tilda Wiberg
- 19 (Sweden) Binto Linnér
- 27 (Sweden) Cassandra Tollbring

CB

- 2 (Sweden) Emma Jönsson
- 10 (Sweden) Isabelle Andersson
- 21 (Sweden) Moa Heiman
- 22 (Sweden) Emma Nuhanovic

RB

- 6 (Sweden) Victoria Larsson
- 7 (Sweden) Linnea Pripp
- 14 (Sweden) Malin Sandberg

=== Transfers ===
Transfers for the 2023-24 season.

Joining

- (Sweden) Wilma Pettersson (CB) (from (Sweden) Kungälvs HK)

Leaving

- (Sweden) Malin Sandberg (RB) (to (France) ESBF Besançon)
- (Sweden) Isabelle Andersson (CB) (to (Germany) SG BBM Bietigheim)

== Former club members ==
=== Notable former players ===
- (Australia) Catherine Kent (2004–2007)
- (Denmark) Mia Rej (2011–2014)
- (Sweden) Sofia Hvenfelt (2016–2020)
- (Sweden) Emma Lindqvist (2016–2021)
- (Sweden) Mikaela Mässing (2014–2019)
- (Sweden) Cassandra Tollbring (2014–2017)
- (Sweden) Jessica Ryde (2013–2017)
- (Sweden) Marie Wall (2013–2018)
- (Sweden) Kristin Thorleifsdóttir (2017–2020)
