= Tømmerbakke =

Tømmerbakke is a surname. Notable people with the surname include:

- Andreas Tømmerbakke (1910–1994), Norwegian resistance member
- Kristoffer Tømmerbakke (born 1983), Norwegian record producer, songwriter, and rapper
- Marie Tømmerbakke (born 1993), Norwegian handball player
