= Sofie Flader =

Danish handball player (born 1996)

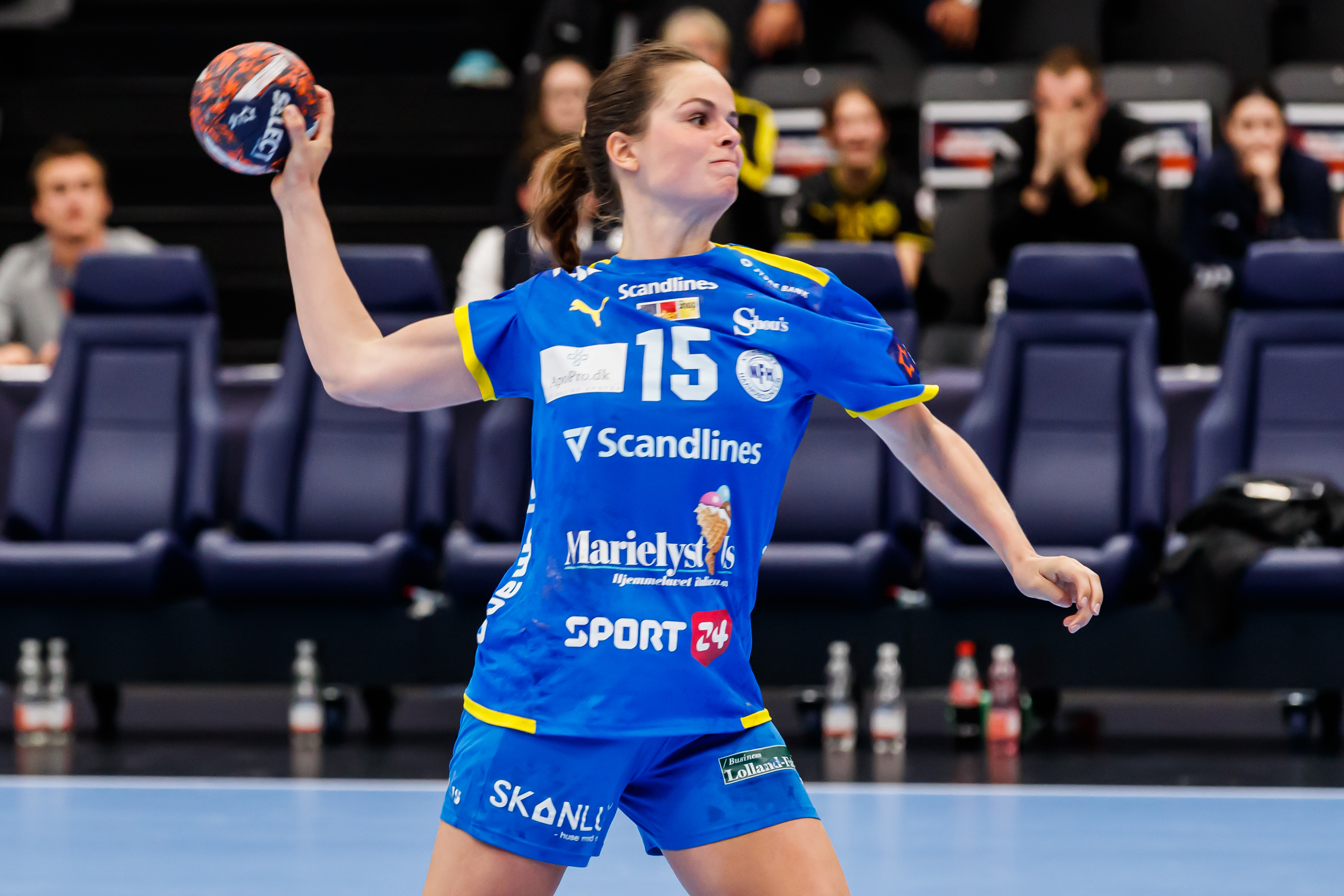
- Flader in May 2023

Personal information
- Full name: Sofie Langballe Flader
- Nationality: Danish
- Born: 4 June 1996 (age 30) Copenhagen, Denmark
- Height: 1.77 m (5 ft 10 in)

Sport
- Sport: Handball
- Position: Left Back
- Current club: Nykøbing Falster
- Number: 15

Youth career
- Years: Team
- 2001-2015: Frederiksberg IF

Senior clubs
- Years: Team
- 2014-2015: København Håndbold
- 2015-2016: Ajax København
- 2016-2017: København Håndbold
- 2017-2020: Aarhus United
- 2020-2023: Nykøbing Falster
- 2023-: København Håndbold
Medal record
Youth World Championship
Gold medal – first place	2016 Russia
Junior European Championship
Bronze medal – third place	2017 Slovenia
Youth European Championship
Gold medal – first place	2015 U-17 Macedonia

Sofie Flader (born 4 June 1996) is a Danish handball player who currently plays for København Håndbold in the Danish Women's Handball League.
