= Bjørndalen =

Bjørndalen or Bjorndalen, sometimes Bjoerndalen is a surname. Notable people with the surname include:

- Dag Bjørndalen, Norwegian biathlete
- Ida Bjørndalen, Norwegian handball player
- Nathalie Santer-Bjørndalen, Italian biathlete
- Ole Einar Bjørndalen, Norwegian biathlete
