= Louise Føns =

Danish handball player and journalist (born 1985)

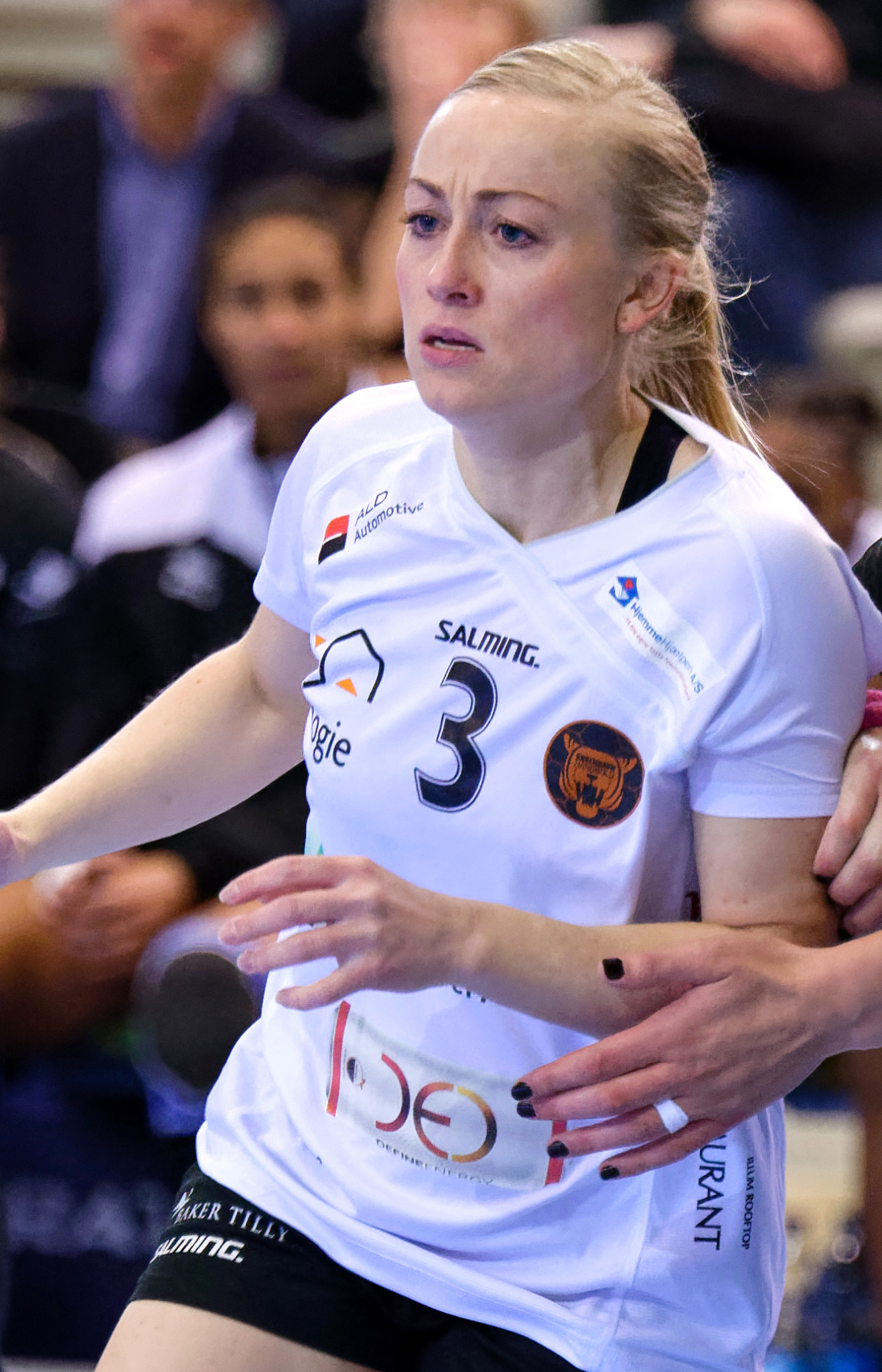
- Louise Føns (2018)

Personal information
- Full name: Louise Føns
- Nationality: Danish
- Born: 18 February 1985 (age 41) Kolding, Denmark
- Height: 1.65 m (5 ft 5 in)

Sport
- Sport: Handball
- Position: Left wing
- Current club: Retired

Senior clubs
- Years: Team
- 1998-2005: Kolding IF
- 2005-2014: KIF Vejen
- 2014-2023: København Håndbold

Louise Føns (born 18 February 1985) is a Danish former handball player and journalist, who played for most of her career at København Håndbold and previously KIF Vejen and Kolding IF.

She won the Danish championship in 2018 with København Håndbold. When she retired in 2023, she had the record for most appearances for København Håndbold with 304 matches, where she had played for the last 9 years. In the 2016-2017 she was part of the København team that reached the championship playoff of the Danish League for the first time in club history. The season after, in 2017/18 she won the Danish championship, the first in club history.
