= Nina Dano =

Swedish handball player (born 2000)

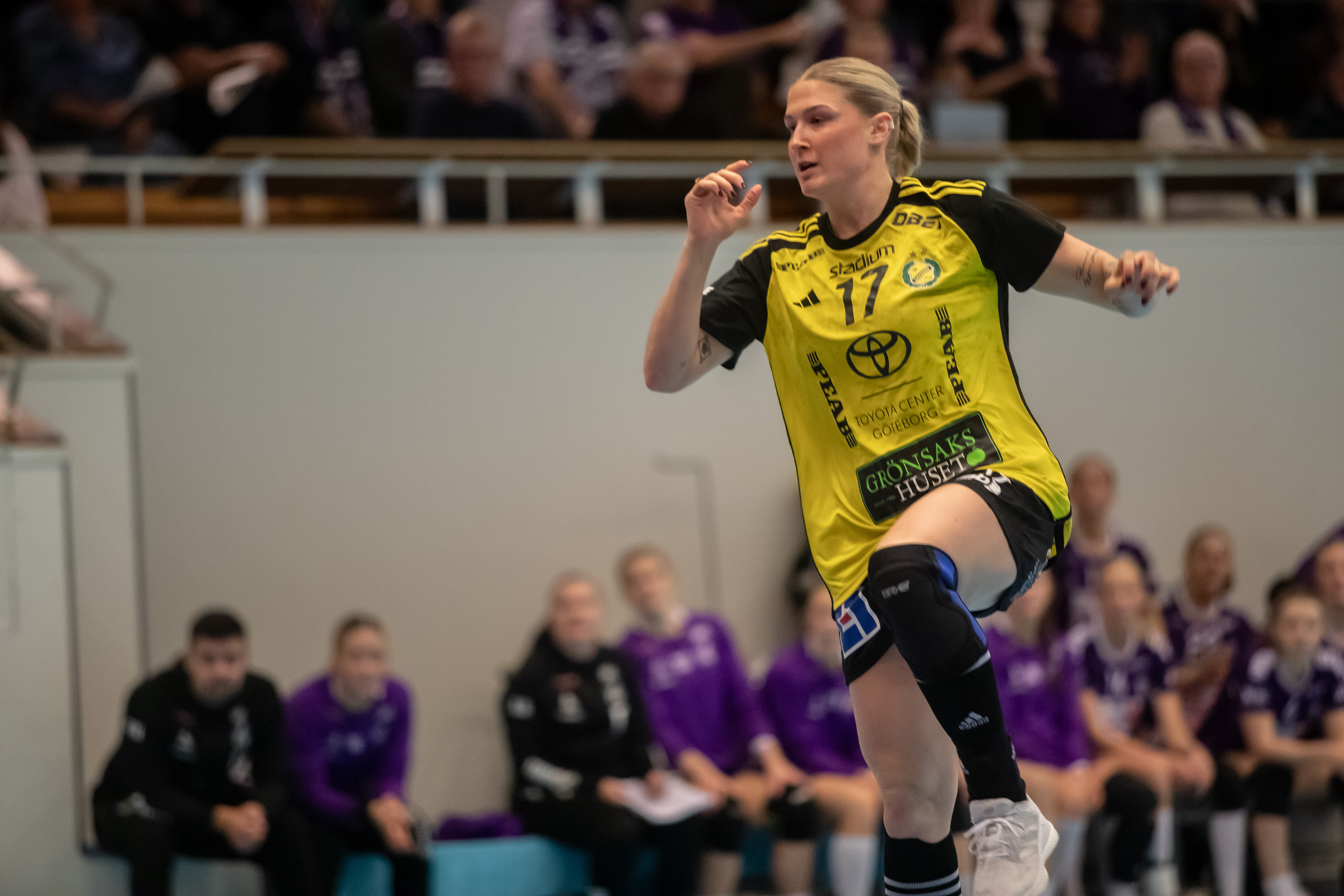

Personal information
- Full name: Sara Brita Nina Dano
- Nationality: Swedish
- Born: 12 June 2000 (age 26) Gothenburg, Sweden
- Height: 1.72 m (5 ft 8 in)

Sport
- Sport: Handball
- Position: Right back
- Current club: HØJ Elite

Youth career
- Years: Team
- –: Torslanda HK

Senior clubs
- Years: Team
- 2017–2018: Torslanda HK
- 2018–2021: IK Sävehof
- 2021–2023: HH Elite
- 2023–2024: Odense Håndbold
- 2024–2026: IK Sävehof
- 2026-: HØJ Elite
National team
Years	Team	Apps	(Gls)
2020–	Sweden	71	(115)
- Updated on 12 April 2026

Sara Brita Nina Dano (born 12 June 2000) is a Swedish handballer for HØJ Elite and the Swedish national team.

She represented Sweden at the 2020 European Women's Handball Championship.

She was included in the brutto team for the 2022 European Women's Handball Championship. In the second match she was however injured and had to leave the tournament. Clara Petersson Bergsten was instead called up as the replacement.

== Achievements ==
- Svensk handbollselit:
  - Winner: 2019
