= Natasja Clausen =

Danish handball player (born 1992)

Personal information
- Full name: Natasja Lemming Clausen
- Nationality: Danish
- Born: 19 April 1992 (age 34) Rødovre, Denmark
- Height: 1.72 m (5 ft 8 in)

Sport
- Sport: Handball
- Position: Goalkeeper
- Current club: Nykøbing Falster Håndboldklub
- Number: 12

Youth career
- Years: Team
- 1998-2007: Rødovre HK
- 2007-2008: HK73 Frederiksund
- 2008-2009: GOG Håndbold
- 2009-2010: Ajax København

Senior clubs
- Years: Team
- 2010-2012: Lyngby HK
- 2012-2019: Ringkøbing Håndbold
- 2019-2021: Nykøbing Falster HK
- 2021-2023: Ajax København
- 2023-: HØJ Elite
Medal record
European Junior Championship
Gold medal – first place	2011 Netherlands
European Youth Championship
Gold medal – first place	2009 Serbia

Natasja Clausen (born 19 April 1992) is a Danish handball player who plays for HØJ Elite in the Danish 1st Division.

She played for Nykøbing Falster Håndboldklub between 2019 and 2021. She then joined Ajax København, where she played from 2021 to 2023, before joining HØJ Elite in 2023 on a two-year deal. In the 2024–25 season she was promoted with the team to the top flight in Denmark.

Between 2009 and 2011 she played for the Danish youth national team.
