= Malin Sandberg =

Swedish handball player (born 2000)

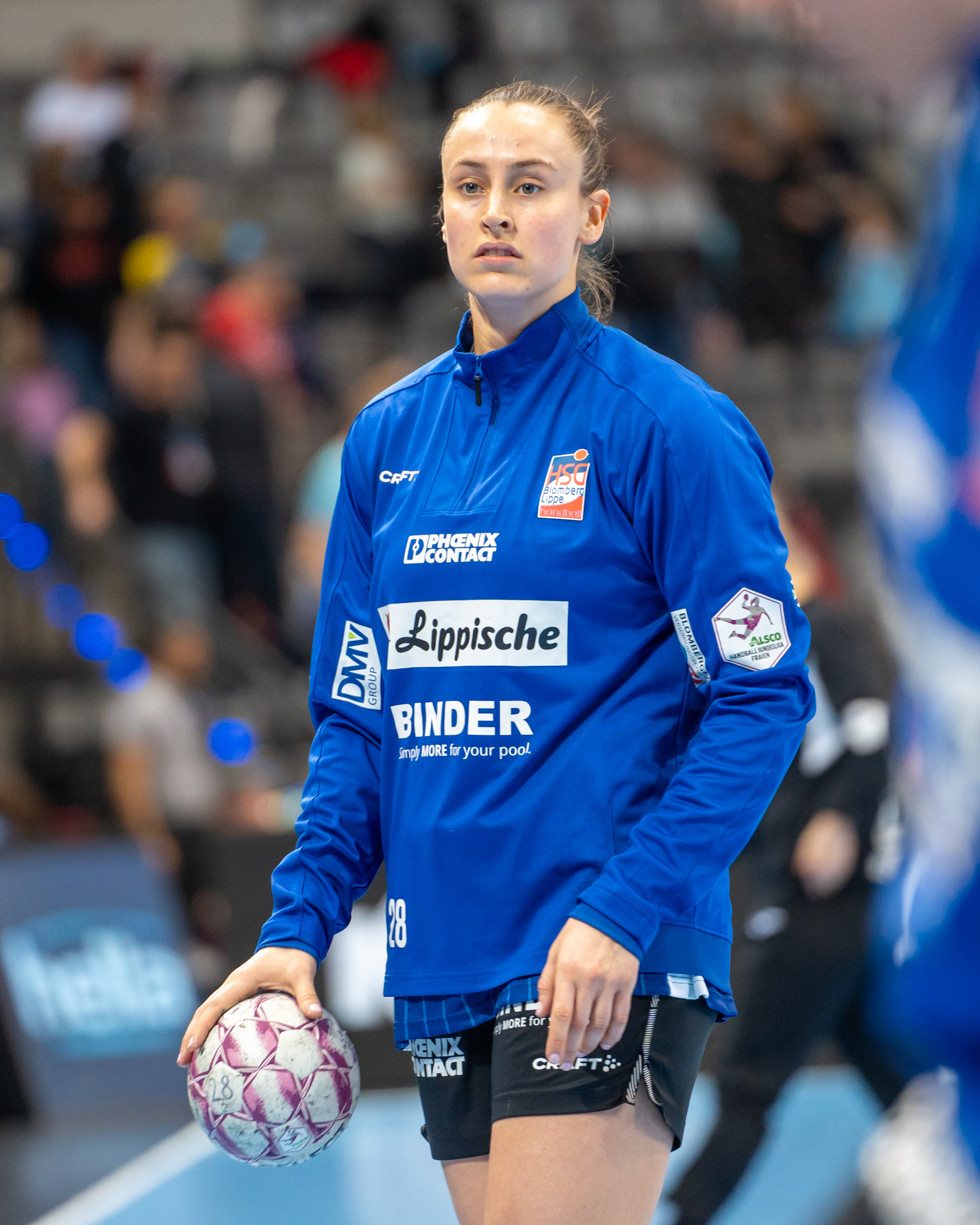

Personal information
- Nationality: Swedish
- Born: 14 April 2000 (age 26) Säve, Sweden
- Height: 1.82 m (6 ft 0 in)

Sport
- Sport: Handball
- Position: Right back
- Current club: HSG Blomberg-Lippe
- Number: 28

Youth career
- Years: Team
- 2015–2016: Kärra HF
- 2016–2017: IK Sävehof

Senior clubs
- Years: Team
- 2017–2019: Önnereds HK
- 2019–2023: H 65 Höör
- 2023–2025: ESBF Besançon
- 2025–: HSG Blomberg-Lippe

Malin Sandberg (born 14 April 2000) is a Swedish handball player for HSG Blomberg-Lippe.

She also represented the Swedish youth team at the 2018 Women's Youth World Handball Championship in Poland and the 2019 Women's U-19 European Handball Championship, placing 4th and 13th.

She joined H 65 Höör for the 2019/20 season, where she played for four seasons. On 31 January 2023, it was announced that she had signed a two-year contract with ESBF Besançon in France.

== Achievements ==
- Svensk handbollselit:
  - Runner-up: 2021
- Swedish Handball Cup:
  - Runner-up: 2023
