= Myrthe Schoenaker =

Dutch handball player (born 1992)

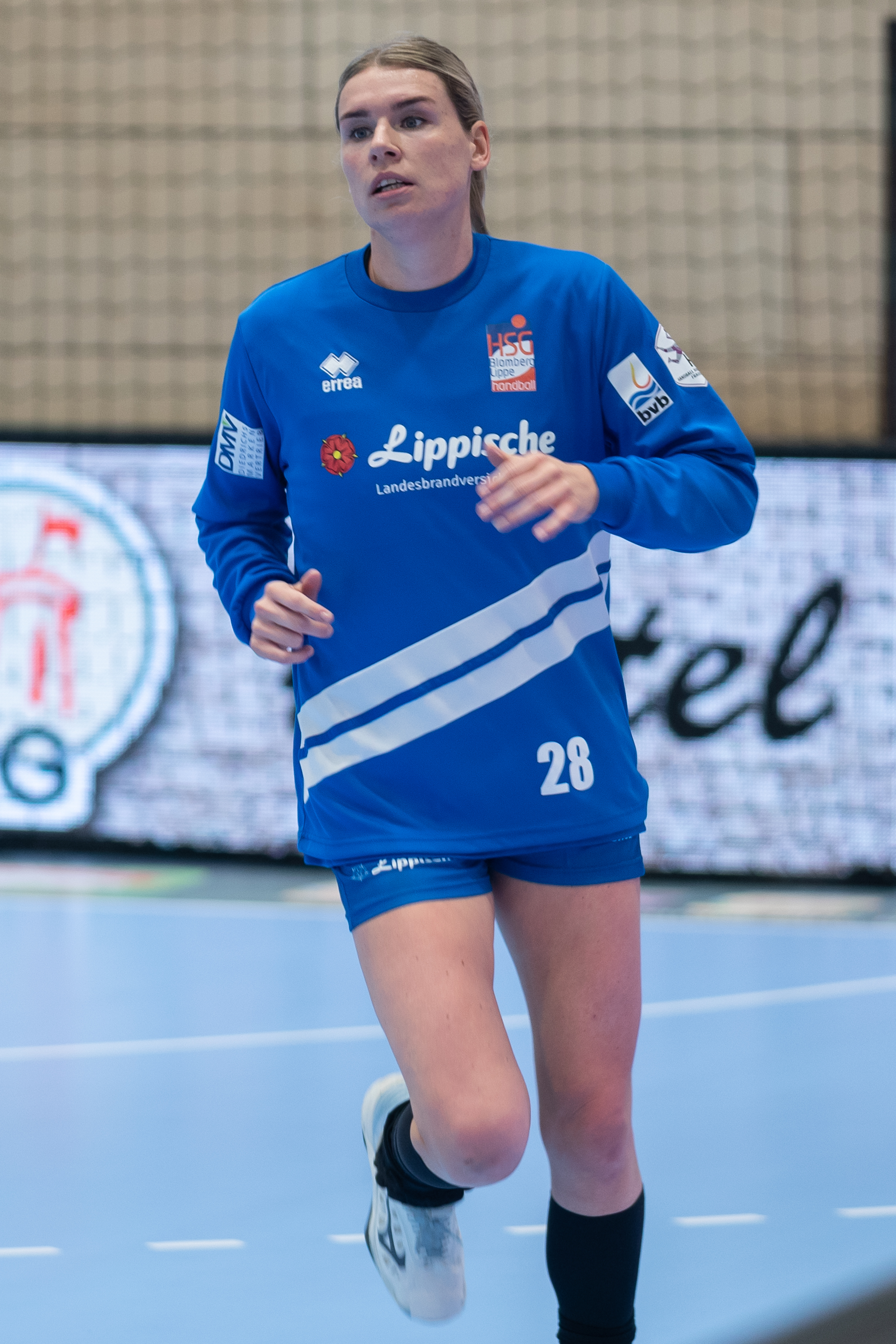

Personal information
- Nationality: Dutch
- Born: 1 June 1992 (age 34) Olst, Netherlands
- Height: 1.76 m (5 ft 9 in)

Sport
- Sport: Handball
- Position: Left back
- Current club: VfL Oldenburg
- Number: 28

Senior clubs
- Years: Team
- –: SC Overwetering
- –2011: Kwiek Raalte
- 2011–2015: SERCODAK Dalfsen
- 2015–2016: Füchse Berlin
- 2016–2018: København Håndbold
- 2018–2020: VfL Oldenburg
- 2020–2021: HSG Blomberg-Lippe
- 2021–2023: HSG Bensheim/Auerbach
National team
Years	Team	Apps	(Gls)
2014–2023	Netherlands	13	(19)
Medal record
European Junior Championship
Silver medal – second place	2011 Netherlands
Youth World Championship
Bronze medal – third place	2010 Dominican Republic

Myrthe Jeanine Schoenaker (born 11 June 1992) is a Dutch former handball player who played for the Dutch national team.

In 2018 she won the Danish championship with København Håndbold; the first title in the clubs history.

She retired in 2023.
