= Var Bentsdóttir Zachariasen =

Faroese handball player (born 2001)

Vár Bentsdóttir Zachariasen
Personal information
- Full name: Var Bentsdóttir Zachariasen
- Nationality: Faroese
- Born: 11 April 2002 (age 24) Hoyvik, Faroe Islands
- Height: 1.79 m (5 ft 10 in)

Sport
- Sport: Handball
- Position: Pivot
- Current club: Ajax København
- Number: 5

Senior clubs
- Years: Team
- –: H71
- 2023-2024: Ringkøbing Håndbold
- 2024-: Ajax København
National team
Years	Team	Apps	(Gls)
2022–	Faroe Islands	9	(4)
- Updated on November 2025

Vár Bentsdóttir Zachariasen (born 11 April 2002) is a Faroese handballer who plays for Ajax København in the Danish Women's Handball League and the Faroe Islands women's national team.

In the 2023–24 season she played for Danish club Ringkøbing Håndbold. In May 2024, she and her twin sister Lív Bentsdóttir Zachariasen signed a 1 year-contract with Ajax København.

At the 2025 World Championship she was part of the Faroe Islands team that played for the first time at a World Championship. With wins over Spain and Paraguay they advanced from the preliminary groups and recorded their first ever win at a major international tournament.
