= Kaja Kamp =

Danish handball player (born 1994)

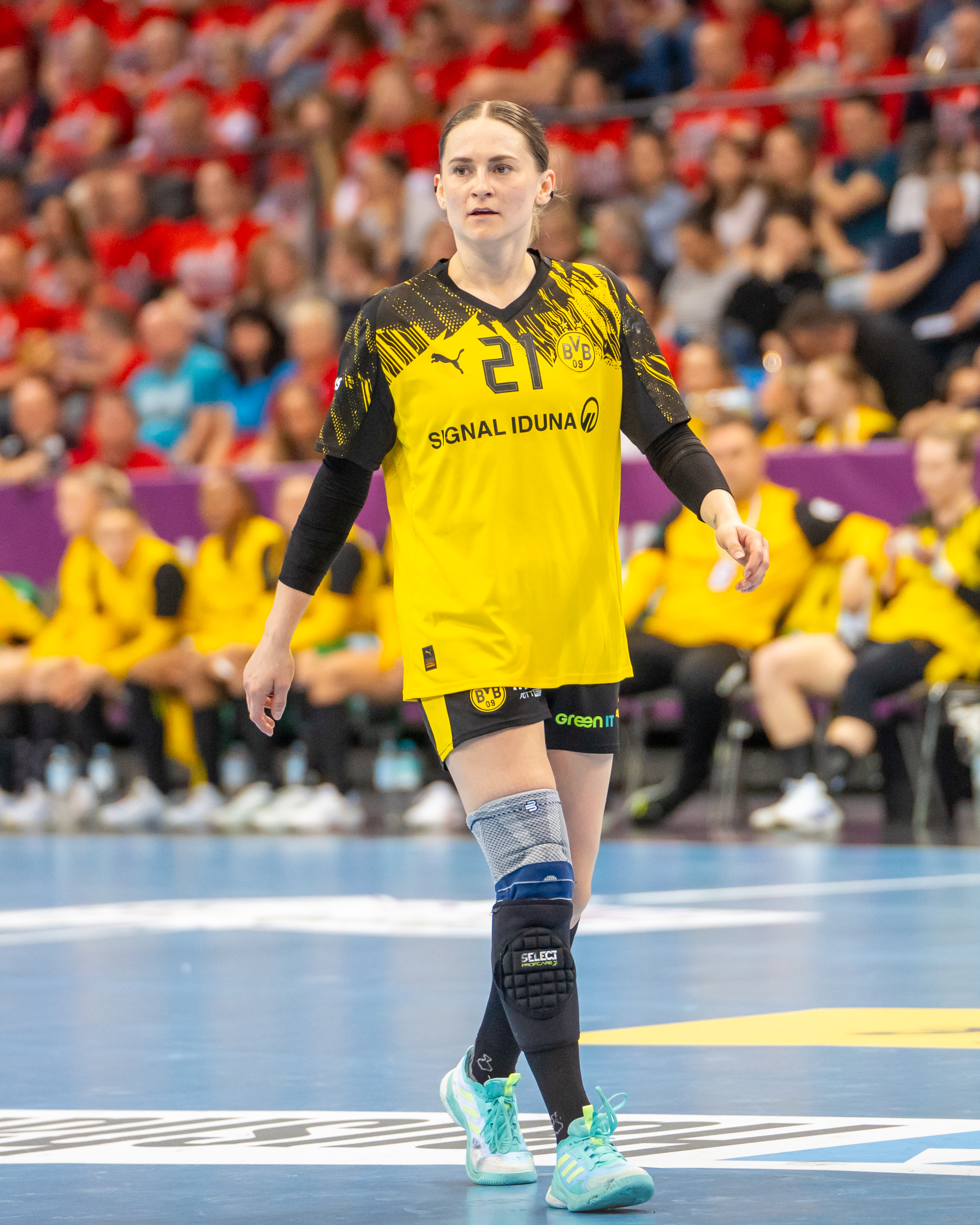

Personal information
- Full name: Kaja Kamp Nielsen
- Nationality: Danish
- Born: 29 April 1994 (age 32) Rebild, Denmark
- Height: 1.72 m (5 ft 8 in)

Sport
- Sport: Handball
- Position: Pivot
- Current club: HØJ Elite

Youth career
- Years: Team
- 2008-2010: Visse IF

Senior clubs
- Years: Team
- 2010–2013: Aalborg DH
- 2013–2017: Vendsyssel Håndbold
- 2017–2018: EH Aalborg
- 2018–2020: Holstebro Håndbold
- 2020–2025: Team Esbjerg
- 2025–2026: Borussia Dortmund
- 2026–: HØJ Elite
National team
Years	Team	Apps	(Gls)
2023–	Denmark	20	(27)
Medal record
World Championship
Bronze medal – third place	2023 Denmark/Norway/Sweden
European Championship
Silver medal – second place	2022 Slovenia/North Macedonia/Montenegro
Silver medal – second place	2024 Austria/Hungary/Switzerland
Women's beach handball
European Championship
Gold medal – first place	2019 Stare Jabłonki
- Updated on 16 January 2025

Kaja Kamp Nielsen (born 29 April 1994) is a Danish handball player for HØJ Elite) and the Danish national team.

She was selected as part of the Danish 20-player squad for the 2022 European Women's Handball Championship, but was not in action. At the 2023 World Cup she was initially not part of the team, but after Kathrine Heindahl was injured in the semifinal, Kamp was called up and participated at the bronze medal match.

Kamp started playing handball at the age of 12 in Visse IF. In 2010 she transferred to Aalborg DH. After the club went bankrupt in 2013, she switched to Vendsyssel Håndbold.

After a year at Borussia Dortmund, she will return to Denmark and join HØJ Elite for the 2026–27 season.

In addition to ordinary handball, Kamp has also played for the Danish national team in Beach handball, where she became a European champion in 2019.
