= Sofie Börjesson =

Swedish handball player (born 1997)

Personal information
- Full name: Sofie Börjesson
- Nationality: Swedish
- Born: 31 May 1997 (age 29) Uddevalla, Sweden
- Height: 1.86 m (6 ft 1 in)

Sport
- Sport: Handball
- Position: Goalkeeper
- Current club: Nykøbing Falster HK
- Number: 1

Youth career
- Years: Team
- 2013–2014: GF Kroppskultur

Senior clubs
- Years: Team
- 2014–2016: GF Kroppskultur
- 2016–2019: Kungälvs HK
- 2019–2022: IK Sävehof
- 2022–2024: Vipers Kristiansand
- 2024–: Nykøbing Falster HK
National team
Years	Team	Apps	(Gls)
2024–	Sweden	1	(0)
Medal record
Junior European Championship
Bronze medal – third place	2015 Spain
Youth European Championship
Gold medal – first place	2013 Poland

Sofie Börjesson (born 31 May 1997) is a Swedish professional handballer currently playing for Boden Handboll IF. She previously played for Nykøbing Falster HK.

She represented Sweden at the 2013 European Women's U-17 Championship, 2014 Women's Youth World Championship, 2015 Women's U-19 European Championship and 2016 Women's Junior World Championship.

== Achievements ==
- EHF Champions League:
  - Winner: 2022/2023
- Norwegian League:
  - Winner: 2022/2023, 2023/2024
- Norwegian Cup:
  - Winner: 2022/2023, 2023/2024
- Swedish Championship:
  - Winner: 2022
- Junior European Championship:
  - Bronze Medalist: 2015
- Youth European Championship:
  - Winner: 2013
