= Louise Svalastog Spellerberg =

Danish handball player (born 1982)

Louise Spellerberg
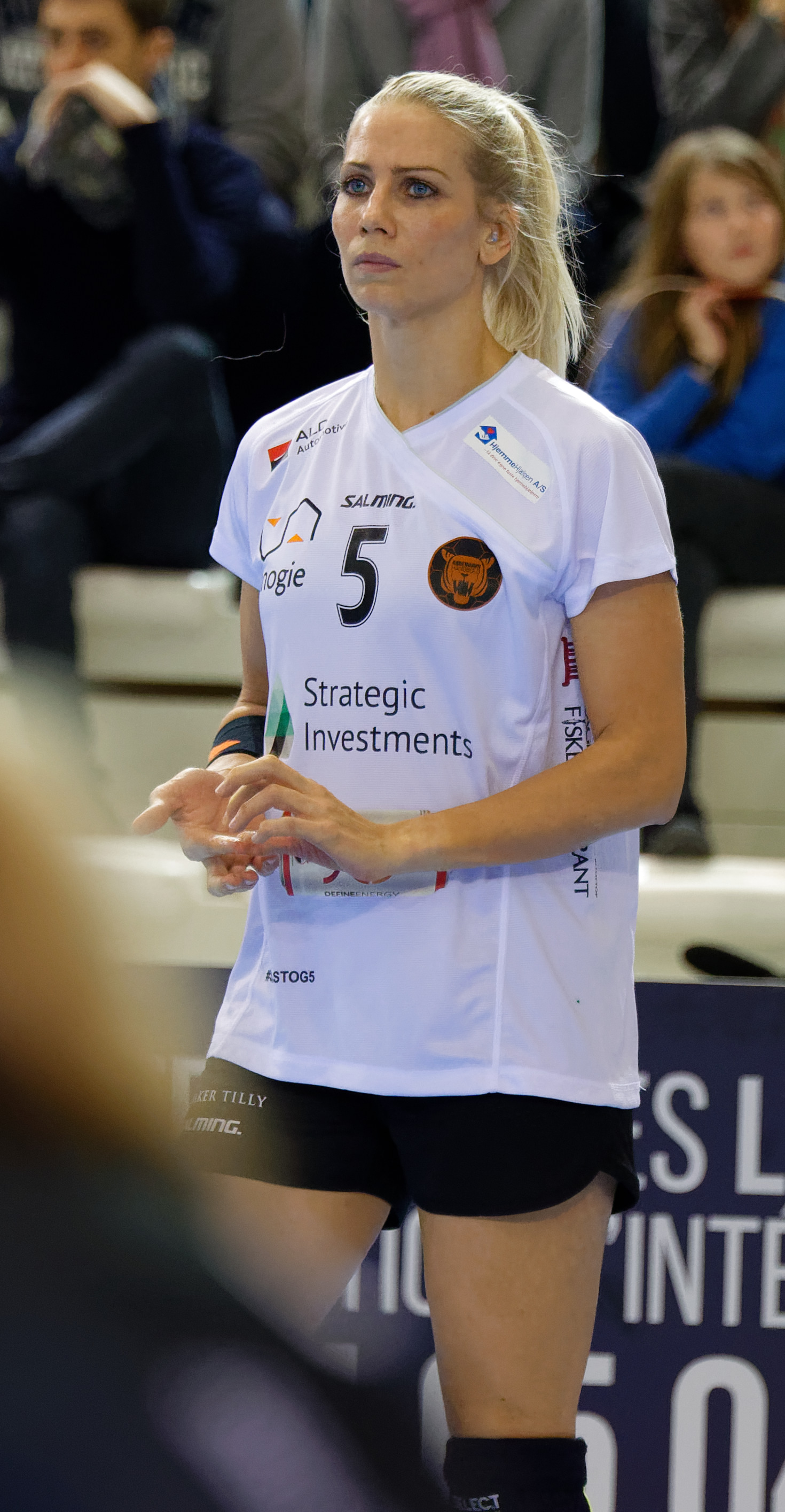
- Jan. 28, 2018

Personal information
- Full name: Louise Ambjörg Svalastog Spellerberg
- Nationality: Danish
- Born: 1 October 1982 (age 44) Kolding, Denmark
- Height: 1.78 m (5 ft 10 in)

Sport
- Sport: Handball
- Position: Pivot
- Number: 5

Senior clubs
- Years: Team
- –2007: KIF Vejen
- 2007–2008: Ikast-Bording EH
- 2008–2011: KIF Vejen
- 2011–2014: FC Midtjylland
- 2014–2018: København Håndbold
- 2020: Nykøbing Falster HK
National team
Years	Team	Apps	(Gls)
2006–2016	Denmark	74	(80)

Louise Ambjörg Svalastog Spellerberg (born 1 October 1982) is a Danish former handball player and currently sporting director at København Håndbold.

She was a member of the Danish national team, and where participated at the 2011 World Women's Handball Championship in Brazil.

== Personal ==
She was married to fellow handball player Bo Spellerberg.
