= Kristian Kristensen (handballer) =

Danish handball coach (born 1974)

Personal information
- Full name: Kristian Boldrup Kristensen
- Nationality: Danish
- Born: 9 June 1974 (age 52) Herlev, Denmark

Sport
- Sport: Handball
- Current club: HØJ Elite

Teams managed
- Years: Team
- 2005-2008: Denmark (youth)
- 2008-2010: FCK Håndbold (assistant coach)
- 2011-2012: Nordsjælland Håndbold
- 2013-2014: Roskilde Håndbold
- 2014-2016: Herning-Ikast Håndbold (assistant coach)
- 2016-2019: Herning-Ikast Håndbold
- 2017-2019: Hungary (Analyser/Physical coach)
- 2019-2020: Ribe-Esbjerg HH (assistant coach)
- 2020-2021: Ribe-Esbjerg HH
- 2022-2024: KIF Kolding
- 2024-: HØJ Elite

Kristian Kristensen (born 9 June 1974) is a Danish team handball coach, who coaches HØJ Elite's women's team. He coached KIF Kolding from 2022 to 2024.

== Career ==
He previously coached Danish women's youth national team, Roskilde Håndbold and Herning-Ikast Håndbold. In 2011 he was appointed head coach of Nordsjælland Håndbold to replace Henrik Kronborg. He was however fired in January in his first season due to mediocre results. He was replaced by Klavs Bruun Jørgensen.

Kristensen were also a part of the Hungarian women's national team, as Analyzer/Physical coach, from 2017 to 2019.

From 2020 to 2021 he was the coached Ribe-Esbjerg HH He quit his job when Ribe-Esbjerg due to disappointing results, when the team was in last place in November 2021 having 6 points from 10 matches.

In February 2022 he was hired as the coach of KIF Kolding, who were battling relegation. He narrowly managed to keep the team in the league, when Peter Balling scored a crucial equalizing goal with 7 seconds to go against TTH Holstebro, which kept them in the league. He was fired at KIF Kolding in the 2024-25 season in October. Despite his firing, KIF Kolding were relegated later the season, when they finished 14th out of 14 in the regular season. A month later he was hired as the head coach of HØJ Elite women's team in the Danish 1st Division. Later the same season he secured promotion to the top flight.
