= Lív Bentsdóttir Zachariasen =

Faroese handball player (born 2001)

Personal information
- Full name: Lív Bentsdóttir Zachariasen
- Nationality: Faroese
- Born: 11 April 2002 (age 24) Hoyvik, Faroe Islands
- Height: 1.79 m (5 ft 10 in)

Sport
- Sport: Handball
- Position: Centre back
- Current club: Ajax København
- Number: 17

Senior clubs
- Years: Team
- 2021–2024: H71
- 2024–: Ajax København
National team
Years	Team	Apps	(Gls)
2022–	Faroe Islands	10	(7)

Lív Bentsdóttir Zachariasen (born 28 June 2004) is a Faroese handball player for Ajax København and the Faroese national team.

== Career ==
In May 2024, she and her twin sister Var Bentsdóttir Zachariasen signed a 1 year-contract with Ajax København. She participated in the Faroese national team's first ever appearance at a major international tournament; the 2024 European Women's Handball Championship in Hungary, Switzerland and Austria, placing 17th overall. At the 2025 World Championship she was part of the Faroe Islands team that played for the first time at a World Championship. With wins over Spain and Paraguay they advanced from the preliminary groups and recorded their first ever win at a major international tournament.

== Achievements ==
- Faroese Women's Handball League
  - Winner (2) : 2022, 2023
- Faroe Islands Cup
  - Winner (1) : 2023
  - Runners-up (1) 2022
