= Christina Elm =

Danish handball player (born 1995)

Personal information
- Nationality: Danish
- Born: 16 June 1995 (age 31) Greve, Denmark
- Height: 1.89 m (6 ft 2 in)

Sport
- Sport: Handball
- Position: Goalkeeper
- Current club: Chevigny Saint Sauveur

Senior clubs
- Years: Team
- 2013–2017: København Håndbold (Denmark)
- 2017–2019: IK Sävehof (Sweden)
- 2019–2021: JDA Dijon Handball (France)
- 2021–2023: Chevigny Saint Sauveur (France)
National team
Years	Team	Apps	(Gls)
2015–2016	Denmark	4	(0)
Medal record
IHF Youth World Championship
Gold medal – first place	2012 Montenegro
European Junior Championship
Bronze medal – third place	2013 Denmark
European Youth Championship
Silver medal – second place	2011 Czech Republic
- Updated on january 2024

Christina Elm (born 16 June 1995) is a Danish handball player. She currently plays for Chevigny Saint Sauveur in France. She has previously played for the Denmark women's national handball team.
