= HØJ Elite (women's handball) =

Danish handball club

HØJ Elite Women
- Full name: HØJ Elitehåndbold
- Founded: 2014; 12 years ago
- Arena: Ølstykke-Hallen, Ølstykke
- Capacity: 500
- President: Lars Vinther
- Head coach: Kristian Kristensen
- League: Damehåndboldligaen
- 2025–26: 9th
- Club colours
Home	Away

Location of HØJ

HØJ Elite Women is a women's handball club based in Ølstykke and Jyllinge, Denmark. As of the 2026-27 season, the team competes in the women's Damehåndboldligaen.

The elite team are part of the association 'HØJ Håndbold', which was founded on 7 January 1995 by a merger of Ølstykke Handball Association and Jyllinge-Gundsømagle Idrætsforening's Handball Department. In the spring of 2014, the elite department was established as 'HØJ Elite'.

The team was promoted to the second tier of Danish handball, the 1st Division in the 2022-23 season.

On March 1, 2025 the club secured promotion to the top league for the first time in club history, 4 rounds before the end of the season. The very same season the club's men's team were also promoted.

After their promotion the club signed a contract to rent the yet-to-be-built Multiarenaen in Ølstykke, as their old court Ølstykke-Hallen did not live up to the requirements in the Danish top flight.

== Arena ==
- Name: Ølstykke-Hallen
- Capacity: 500
- City: Ølstykke, Egedal Municipality
- Address: Tranekærvej 1, 3650 Ølstykke

== Team ==
=== Current squad ===
Squad for the 2026–27 season.

Goalkeepers

- 1 (Denmark) Mathilde Rømer
- 12 (Denmark) Natasja Clausen
- 28 (Denmark) Sarah Nørklit Lønborg
- 89 (Norway) Emily Stang Sando

Wingers
LW

- 23 (Denmark) Trine Mortensen
- 31 (Denmark) Matilde Dalbo Kirkegaard

RW

- 13 (Denmark) Lea Plambeck Florin
- 24 (Sweden) Ida Gullberg

Line players

- 3 (Denmark) Kaja Kamp
- 8 (Sweden) Clara Monti Danielsson
- 10 (Denmark) Filippa Nedovic
- 00 (Norway) Marte Sirén Figenschau

Back players
LB

- 9 (Denmark) Anne Cathrine Lundbye
- 14 (Netherlands) Judith van der Helm
- 21 (Denmark) Signe Bang Andersen
- 29 (Sweden) Frida Rosell

CB

- 5 (Denmark) Clara Kvisgaard
- 15 (Denmark) Emma Navne
- 27 (Denmark) Nadia Mielke-Offendal

RB

- 4 (Denmark) Julie Groth Persson
- 17 (Sweden) Nina Dano

=== Transfers ===
Transfers for the season 2026-27

Joining

- (Denmark) Mathilde Rømer (GK) (from (Norway) Fredrikstad BK)
- (Netherlands) Judith van der Helm (LB) (from (Denmark) Team Esbjerg)
- (Denmark) Signe Bang Andersen (LB) (from (Denmark) Odense Håndbold)
- (Denmark) Nadia Mielke-Offendal (CB) (from (France) Jeanne d'Arc Dijon Handball)
- (Sweden) Nina Dano (RB) (from (Sweden) IK Sävehof)
- (Denmark) Kaja Kamp (P) (from (Germany) Borussia Dortmund)
- (Norway) Marte Sirén Figenschau (P) (from (Norway) Follo HK Damer)

Leaving

- (Sweden) Martina Thörn (GK) (to ?)
- (Denmark) Sørine Wolff (GK) (to (Sweden) Skövde HF)
- (Denmark) Flora BG Hansen (LW) (to (Denmark) Ikast Håndbold) ?
- (Faroe Islands) Marita Mortensen (LB) (to (Denmark) Nykøbing Falster Håndboldklub)
- (Denmark) Anne-Louise Moesgaard (LB) (to (Sweden) OV Helsingborg)
- (Denmark) Mia Rej (CB) (Retires)
- (Denmark) Liv Navne (RB) (to (Germany) BSV Sachsen Zwickau)
- (Denmark) Caroline Duelund (P) (to (Sweden) Skövde HF)

=== Staff ===
Pos.	Name
Head coach	(Denmark) Kristian Kristensen
Assistant coach	(Denmark) Kasper Jensen
Goalkeeping coach	(Denmark) Thomas Mogelin
Team leader	(Denmark) Henrik Jørgensen
Team leader	(Denmark) Helle Rasmussen
Physical coach	(Denmark) Chrisian Hagenbæk

== Kit manufacturers ==
- (Sweden) Craft Sportswear
