= Thea Mørk =

Norwegian handball player (born 1991)

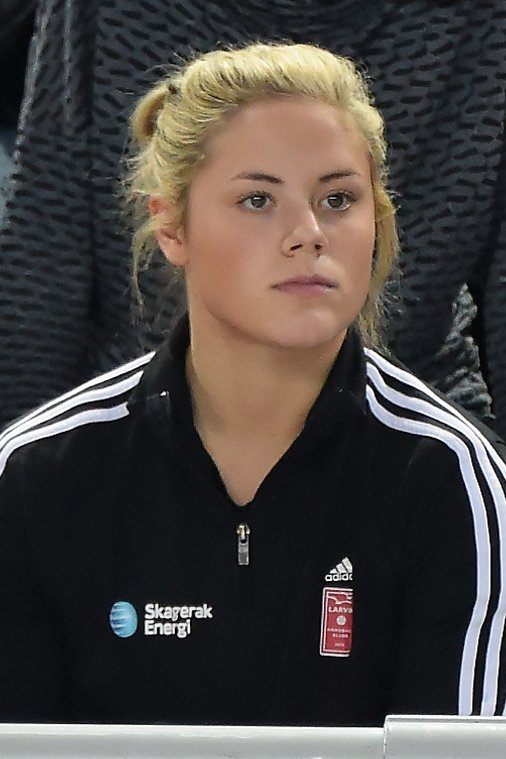
- Mørk in 2014

Personal information
- Nationality: Norwegian
- Born: 5 April 1991 (age 35) Oslo, Norway
- Height: 1.70 m (5 ft 7 in)

Sport
- Sport: Handball
- Position: Left wing

Youth career
- Years: Team
- –: Bækkelaget SK

Senior clubs
- Years: Team
- 2007: Bækkelaget SK
- 2007: Aalborg DH
- 2008: Bækkelaget SK
- 2008–2010: Njård IL
- 2010–2018: Larvik HK
- 2018: København Håndbold
National team
Years	Team	Apps	(Gls)
2016–2018	Norway	18	(35)

Thea Mørk (born 5 April 1991) is a retired Norwegian female handball player, who last played for København Håndbold.

Mørk announced her retirement from handball in December 2018 at the age of 27. She struggled with many injuries throughout her career.

== Achievements ==
- Norwegian Championship:
  - Winner: 2010/2011, 2011/2012, 2012/2013, 2013/2014, 2014/2015, 2015/2016, 2016/2017
  - Silver medalist: 2017/2018
- Norwegian Cup:
  - Winner: 2010, 2011, 2012, 2013, 2014, 2015, 2016

== Individual awards ==
- All-Star Left Wing of Grundigligaen: 2016/2017
- All-Star Left Wing of Eliteserien: 2017/2018

== Personal life ==
She is a twin sister of Nora Mørk.
