= Marie Wall =

Swedish handball player (born 1992)

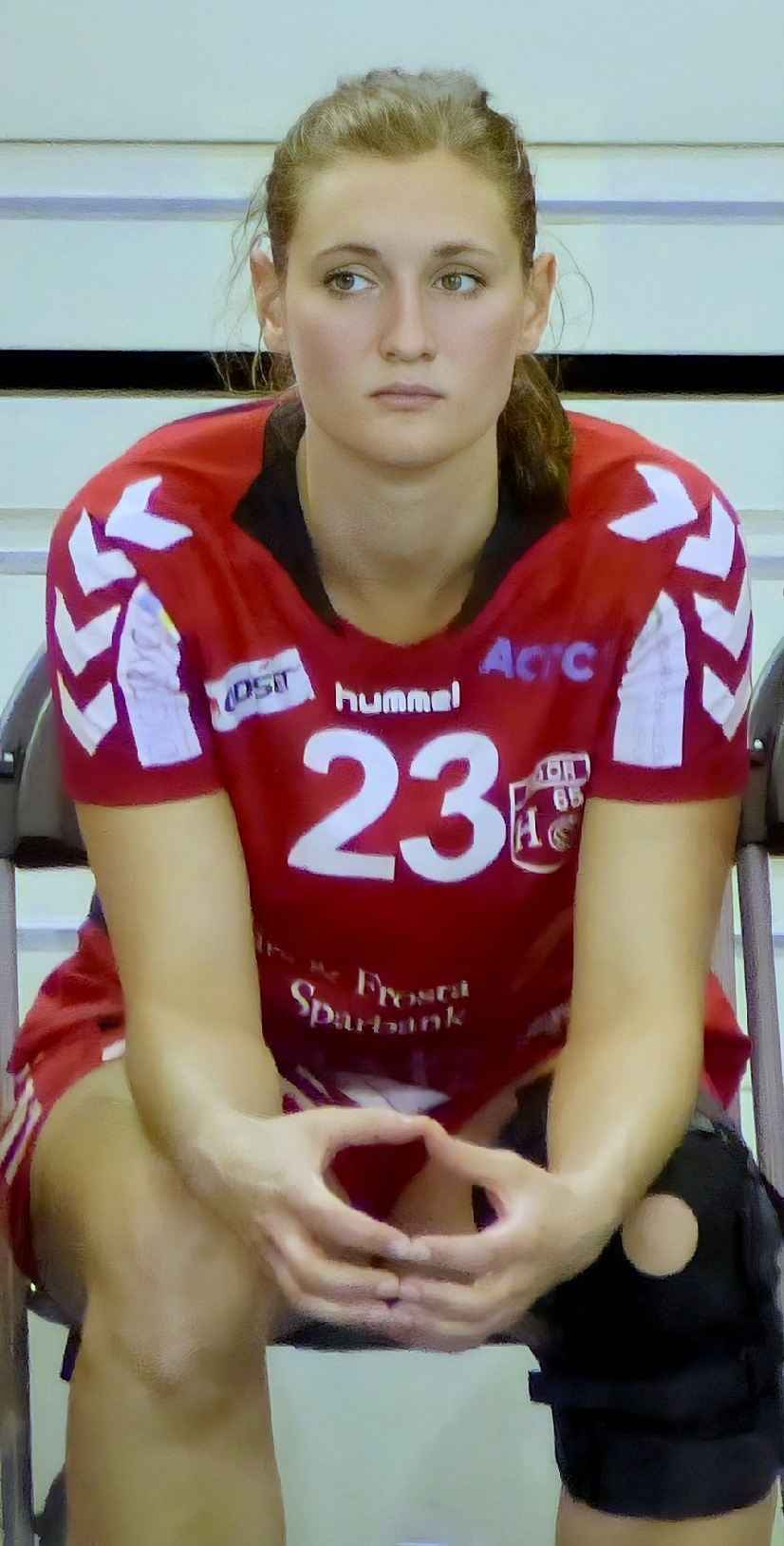
- Marie Wall in 2014

Personal information
- Nationality: Swedish
- Born: 3 April 1992 (age 34) Kungälv, Sweden
- Height: 1.77 m (5 ft 10 in)

Sport
- Sport: Handball
- Position: Left wing

Senior clubs
- Years: Team
- 2010–2013: H43 Lundagaard
- 2013–2018: H 65 Höör
- 2018–2020: København Håndbold
- 2020–2022: Kungälvs HK
National team
Years	Team	Apps	(Gls)
2015–2019	Sweden	34	(38)

Marie Wall (born 3 April 1992) is a former Swedish handball player, who last played for Kungälvs HK and the Swedish national team.

She competed at the 2015 World Women's Handball Championship in Denmark.

== Career ==
Marie Wall began to play handball in Kungälvs HK. It was going well and she was playing for the junior national team. Kungälv played in division 1 South 2009/2010 but lost to H43/Lundagård. Under summer 2010 was Wall with the National youth team and took JVM-guld in Dominican Republic. Wall chose to play for H43/Lundagård in Swedish "elitserien". She had a good season with the club, but next season she had a serious knee injury. It took one year for her to rehabitate after the injury. She returned in autumn 2012 and contributed to H43/Lundagård best elitserie season and the club made it to the quarterfinal. The club met IK Sävehof, the Swedish champions, and lost 0–3 in games. The club then stopped playing in the elitserien due to economic reasons. Marie Wall chose to play for H 65 Höör instead.

In H 65 Höör she developed to one of Sweden's best left wing player. H 65 have had good results in EHF:s cups and the players have got international routine and developed. 2014 H65 won EHF Challenge Cup. Marie Wall made to the national team and was playing in the 2015 World Championship in Danmark. But she was not chosen for 2016 Olympics in Rio de Janeiro. Before 2016 European Championship in Sweden Olivia Mellegård was chosen instead of Marie Wall, but Mellegård got at head injure in game against France and Marie Wall was replacing her in the last game of the tournament.

Wall played 26 junior national teams matches, 13 youth-national teams matches and 34 matches for the national team to December 2019.

She decided to end her career in 2022.

== Achievements ==
- JVM-gold 2010 with Sveriges U18-national team
- Gold EHF Challenge Cup 2014 with H65 Höör
- Swedish championship 2017 with H 65 Höör
