= Debbie Bont =

Dutch handball player (born 1990)

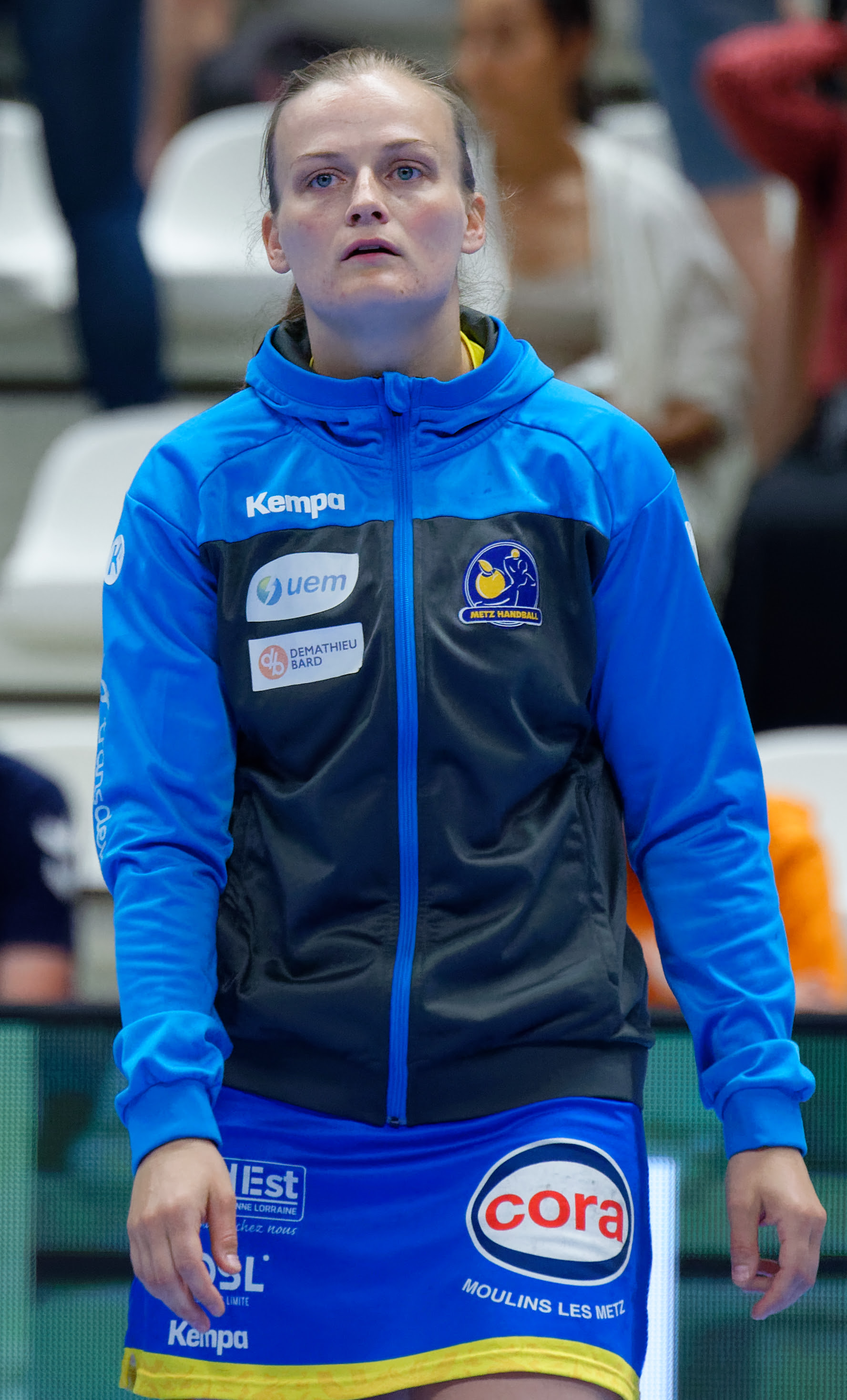
- Bont in 2022

Personal information
- Nationality: Dutch
- Born: 9 December 1990 (age 35) Edam-Volendam, Netherlands
- Height: 1.75 m (5 ft 9 in)

Sport
- Sport: Handball
- Position: Right wing

Senior clubs
- Years: Team
- –: HC Volendam
- –2012: VOC Amsterdam
- 2012: FC Midtjylland Håndbold
- 2012–2014: HC Leipzig
- 2014–2015: SERCODAK Dalfsen
- 2015–2020: København Håndbold
- 2020–2023: Metz Handball
National team
Years	Team	Apps	(Gls)
2009–2022	Netherlands	216	(425)

Teams managed
- 2024-: Garage Kil/Volendam
Medal record
World Championship
Gold medal – first place	2019 Japan
Silver medal – second place	2015 Denmark
Bronze medal – third place	2017 Germany
European Championship
Silver medal – second place	2016 Sweden
Bronze medal – third place	2018 France
- Updated on 5 August 2025

Debbie Bont (born 9 December 1990) is a Dutch handball former player and current coach. Since July 2024 she has been the coach at the Dutch team Garage Kil/Volendam. As a player, she featured in the Dutch national team. In 2019 she became a World Champion with the Dutch team.

== Career ==
Bont played in the Netherlands for HC Volendam and VOC Amsterdam. With VOC Amsterdam she won the 2008, 2009 and 2010 Dutch championship, 2009 and 2010 Dutch cup and 2008 and 2010 Dutch supercup.

In January 2012 she joined Danish side FC Midtjylland Håndbold, where she only played for 6 months before joining HC Leipzig for the 2012–13 season. Here she won the 2014 DHB-Pokal.

In 2014 she joined Dutch side SV Dalfsen. In July 2015 she moved back to Denmark and joined København Håndbold. Here she won the 2018 Danish championship; the first title in the history of the club.

In 2020 she joined French team Metz Handball. Here she won the 2022 and 2023 French championship and Cup double. She left the club in 2023.

=== National team ===
Bont debuted for the Dutch national team on 7 March 2009, against Spain.

She represented the Netherlands in six World Championships (in Brazil 2011, in Serbia 2013, winning silver in Denmark 2015, bronze in Germany 2017, gold in Japan 2019 and in Spain 2021), one edition of the Olympic Games and in five European Championships (in Denmark & Norway 2010, in Hungary & Croatia 2014, winning silver in Sweden 2016, bronze in France 2018 and in Denmark 2020).

She retired from the Dutch national team in 2022, one year before stopping at club level. She played 216 games for the Dutch team, scoring 425 goals.
