= Aimée von Pereira =

German handball player (born 2000)

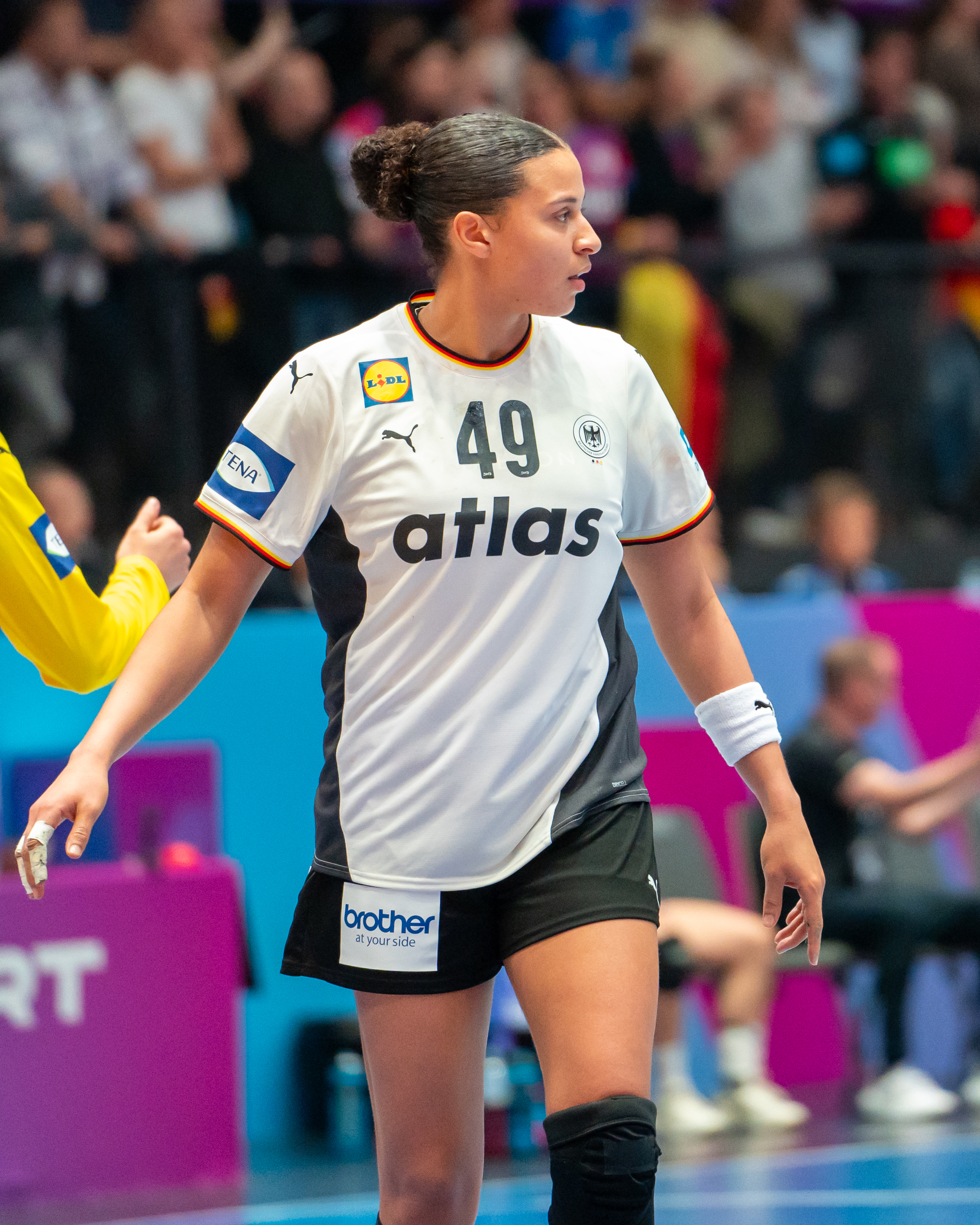

Personal information
- Full name: Aimée von Pereira
- Nationality: German
- Born: 16 February 2000 (age 26) Hamburg, Germany
- Height: 1.83 m (6 ft 0 in)

Sport
- Sport: Handball
- Position: Left back
- Current club: København Håndbold
- Number: 49

Senior clubs
- Years: Team
- –2018: Buxtehuder SV
- 2018–2019: Bayer 04 Leverkusen
- 2019–2021: København Håndbold
- 2021–2023: OGC Nice Handball
- 2023–2025: Nykøbing Falster Håndboldklub
- 2025–: København Håndbold
National team
Years	Team	Apps	(Gls)
2025-	Germany	6	(4)
Medal record
World Championship
Silver medal – second place	2025 Netherlands/Germany
- Updated on 7 November 2025

Aimée von Pereira (born 16 February 2000) is a German handball player who plays for Danish club København Håndbold.

In September 2018, she was included by EHF in a list of the twenty best young handballers to watch for the future.

She made her debut for the German national team on 6 March 2025 against France. Later the same year she played her first major international tournament at the 2025 World Women's Handball Championship at home. Here Germany reached the final, where they lost to Norway. This was the first time since 1994 that Germany made the final of a major international tournament and the first time they won a medal since 2007.

== Achievements ==
- German Vice Champion, wjA 2018
- European U-17 Handball Championship:
  - Gold Medalist: 2017
- German Champion, wjA 2017
- Schleswig-Holstein Schools, Federal State Champion 2009
- 2025 World Women's Handball Championship: Silver

== Individual awards ==
- Most Valuable Player of the European U-17 Handball Championship: 2017
