= Ida Gullberg =

Swedish handball player (born 1999)

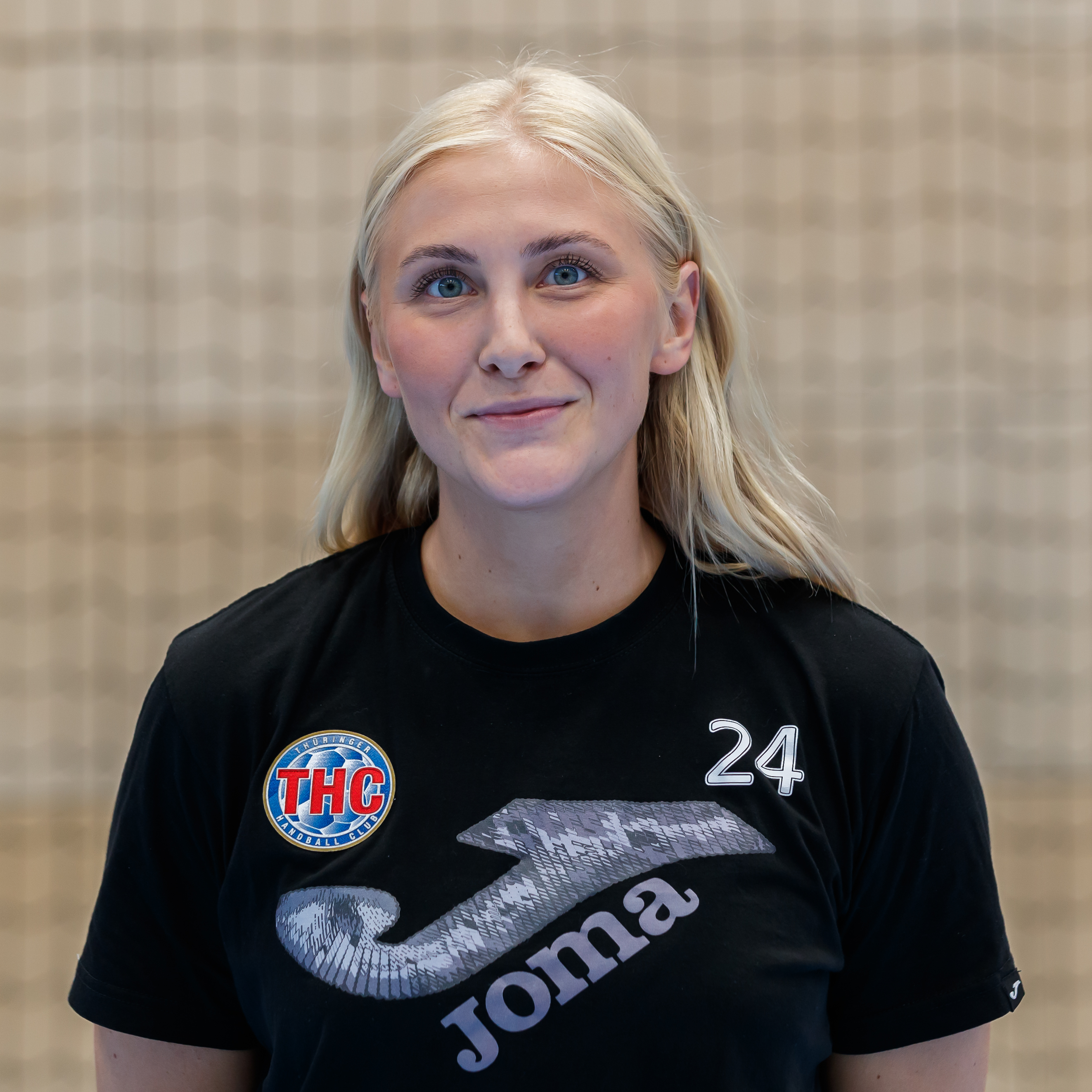
- Gullberg in August 2023.

Personal information
- Full name: Ida Karolina Gullberg
- Nationality: Swedish
- Born: 25 September 1998 (age 28) Anderslöv, Sweden
- Height: 1.76 m (5 ft 9 in)

Sport
- Sport: Handball
- Position: Right wing
- Current club: HØJ Elite
- Number: 24

Senior clubs
- Years: Team
- 2016–2023: H 65 Höör
- 2023–2025: Thüringer HC
- 2025–: HØJ Elite
National team
Years	Team	Apps	(Gls)
2021–	Sweden	7	(4)
- Updated on 30 November 2025

Ida Gullberg (born 25 September 1998) is a Swedish handball player who plays for HØJ Elite in Denmark and for the Swedish national team. Gullberg won the Swedish Handball League in 2017 with H 65 Höör for the first time in the club's history.

She made her official debut on the Swedish national team on 26 November 2021 against Montenegro, scoring three goals.

On 18 April 2025, Gullberg signed a two-year contract with HØJ Elite, after two seasons at German Thüringer HC.

== Achievements ==
- Svensk handbollselit:
  - Winner: 2017
  - Silver Medalist: 2018, 2021, 2023
- Swedish Handball Cup:
  - Silver Medalist: 2023
- EHF Challenge Cup:
  - Silver Medalist: 2017
