= Judith van der Helm =

Dutch handball player (born 2005)

Personal information
- Born: 13 January 2005 (age 21) Delft, Netherlands
- Height: 1.82 m (6 ft 0 in)

Sport
- Sport: Handball
- Position: Left back
- Current club: HØJ Elite

Senior clubs
- Years: Team
- 2021–12/2024: OTTO Work Force/VOC Amsterdam
- 01/2025–2026: Team Esbjerg
- 2026–: HØJ Elite
National team
Years	Team	Apps	(Gls)
2023–	Netherlands	27	(16)

Judith van der Helm (born 13 January 2005) is a Dutch handball player for HØJ Elite and the Dutch national team. She represented Netherlands at the 2024 Summer Olympics and at the 2024 European Women's Handball Championship.

On 30 December 2024, it was announced that van der Helm signed 1.5 year contract with Team Esbjerg. With the club she won the 2025–26 Kvindeligaen. In 2026, she joined HØJ Elite.

Van der Helm made her debut for the Dutch national team in April 2023 against Sweden. For the 2023 World Women's Handball Championship she was part of the extended squad, but did not make the tournament. For the 2024 Olympics, she was once again part of the extended squad, and due to an injury to Zoe Sprengers, she did make the tournament this time.
