= Marie Tømmerbakke =

Norwegian handball player (born 1993)

Marie Sundfør Tømmerbakke
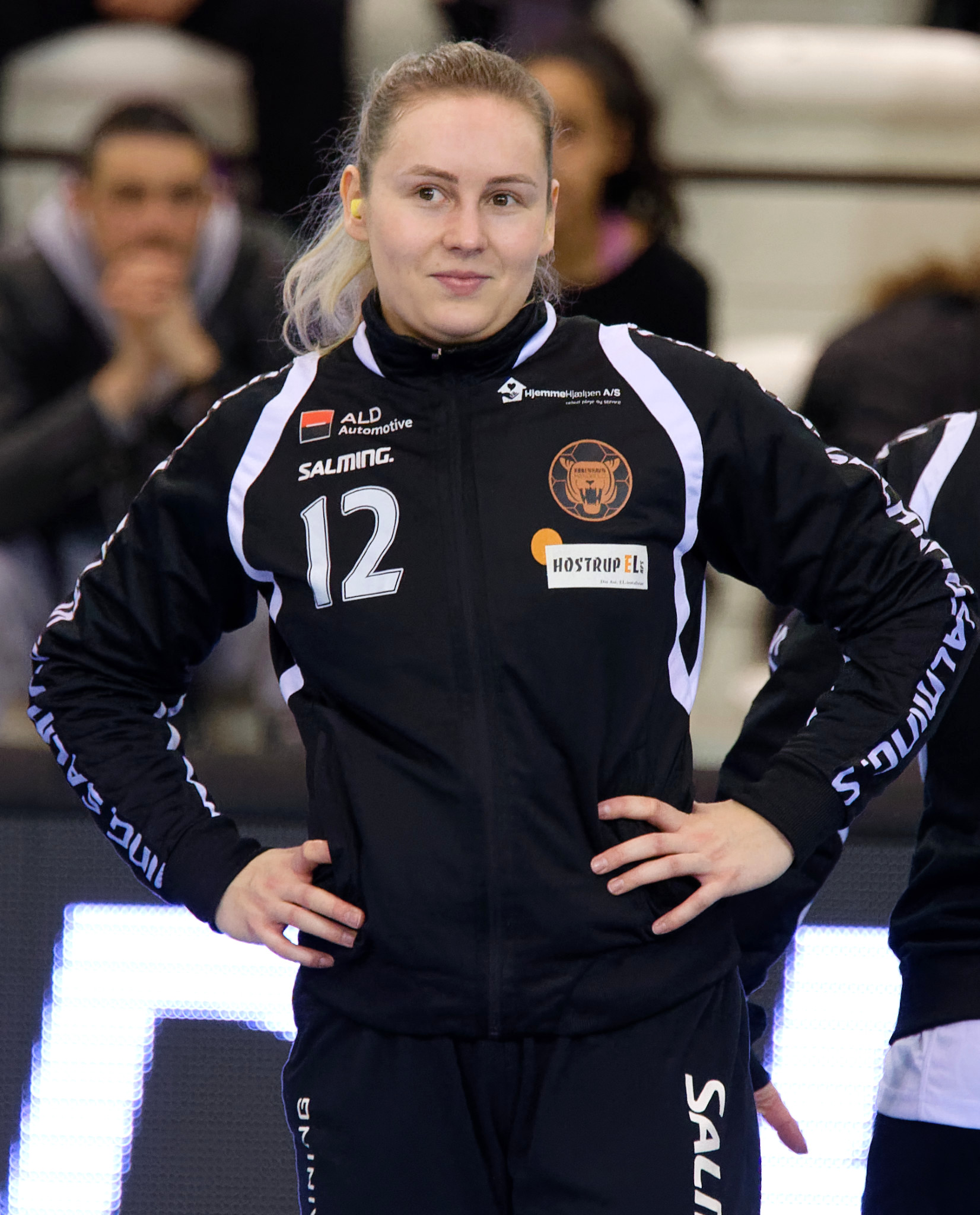
- Marie Tømmerbakke (2018)

Personal information
- Nationality: Norwegian
- Born: 10 January 1993 (age 33) Oslo, Norway
- Height: 1.68 m (5 ft 6 in)

Sport
- Sport: Handball
- Position: Goalkeeper
- Number: 12

Senior clubs
- Years: Team
- 2009–2017: Oppsal
- 2017–2018: København Håndbold
Medal record
Youth World Championship
Silver medal – second place	2010 Dominican Republic

Marie Tømmerbakke (born 10 January 1993) is a former Norwegian handball player, who last played for København Håndbold.

She also represented Norway in the 2011 Women's Junior European Handball Championship, placing 12th, and in the 2012 Women's Junior World Handball Championship, placing 8th.

== Achievements ==
- World Youth Championship:
  - Silver Medalist: 2010

== Individual awards ==
- All-Star Goalkeeper of Grundigligaen: 2015/2016, 2016/2017
