= Mia Rej =

Danish handball player (born 1990)

Mia Rej Frahm
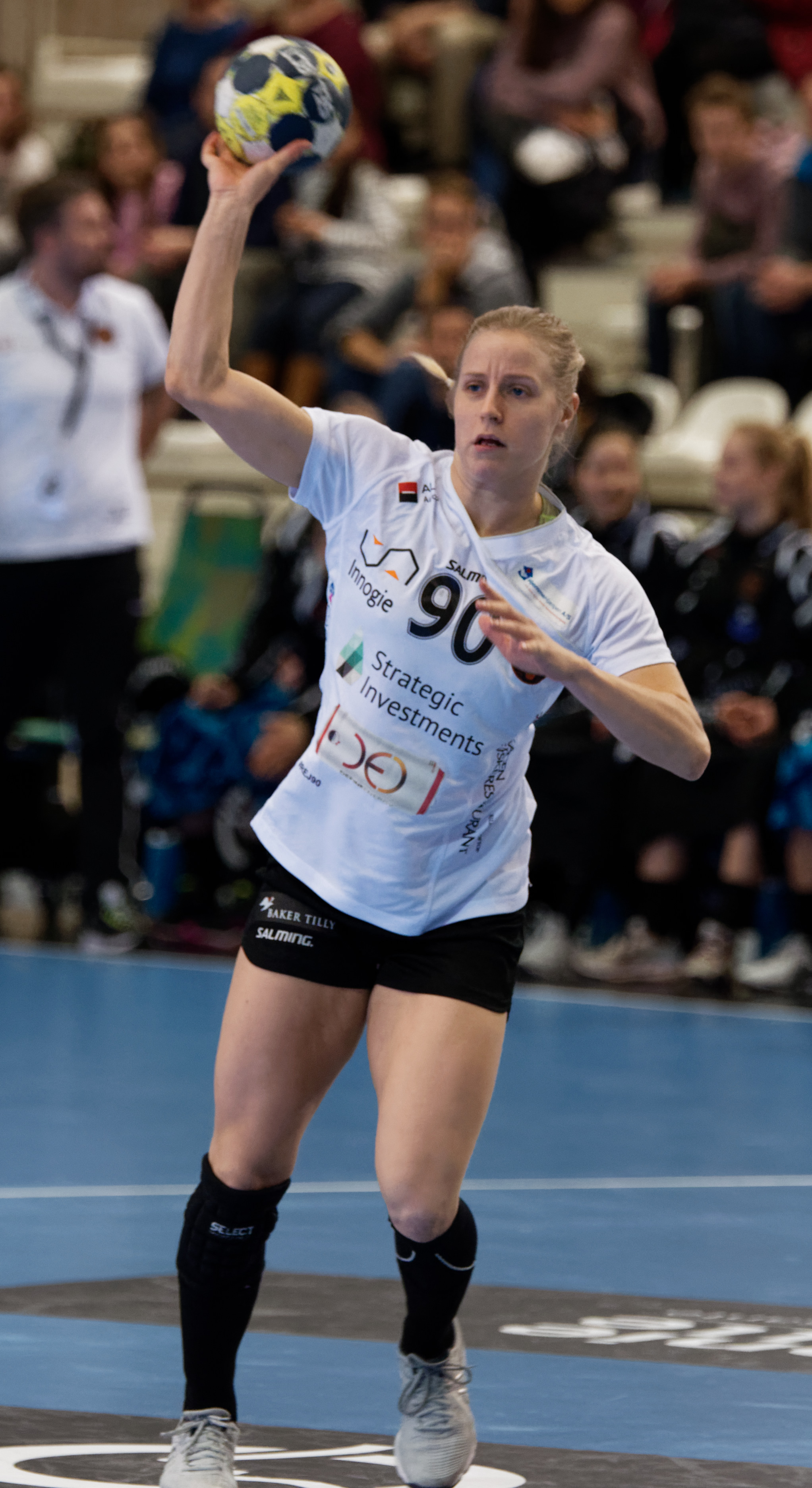

Personal information
- Nationality: Danish
- Born: 2 February 1990 (age 36) Valby, Denmark
- Height: 1.68 m (5 ft 6 in)

Sport
- Sport: Handball
- Position: Centre back
- Current club: HØJ Elite
- Number: 24

Senior clubs
- Years: Team
- 2008–2009: Nordkøbenhavn Håndbold
- 2009–2010: FCK Håndbold
- 2010–2011: Roskilde Håndbold
- 2011–2014: H 65 Höör
- 2014–2020: København Håndbold
- 2020–2023: Odense Håndbold
- 2025–2026: HØJ Elite
National team
Years	Team	Apps	(Gls)
2016–2023	Denmark	40	(90)
Medal record
World Championship
Bronze medal – third place	2021 Spain
IHF Youth World Championship
Bronze medal – third place	2008 Slovakia

Mia Rej (born 2 February 1990) is a Danish handball player for HØJ Elite. She has previously played for the Danish national team.

== Career ==
In the summer of 2009 she switched from the 2nd tier team Nordkøbenhavn Håndbold to FCK Håndbold. In the 2010–11 season she played for Roskilde Håndbold, after which she joined Swedish H 65 Höör. In her last match for Höör in 2014 she got a cruciate ligament injury.

=== København Håndbold ===
In 2014 she moved back to Denmark and joined København Håndbold. Here she won the 2017-18 Danish Championship, the first in club history.

In 2018 she tore her cruciate ligament again while playing for the Danish national team.

In the 2019–20 season she was the top scorer in the ordinary season in the Danish top league, Damehåndboldligaen with 170 goals.

=== Odense Håndbold ===
The following summer she joined league rivals Odense Håndbold. The same season she won the Danish Women's Handball Cup with Odense.

In the 2020-21 season, she won the Danish Championship with Odense Håndbold. This was the first title in club history. The following season she won the title again.

=== HØJ Elite ===
She initially retired in 2023, but in January 2025 she made a comeback for the Danish second tier side HØJ Elite at the age of 35. Later the same season she won the 1st Division and secured promotion to the top flight. In March 2025, she announced her intention to retire after the 2025–26 season.

== National team ==
She made her debut on the national team on 9 March 2016 against Russia.

She represented Denmark at the 2019 World Women's Handball Championship, after she was added to the team to replace the injured Simone Böhme in the main round.

At the 2020 European Championship, she finished 4th with the Danish team.

At the 2021 World Championship she won bronze medals with the Danish team.
