= Jerry Tollbring =

Swedish handball player (born 1995)

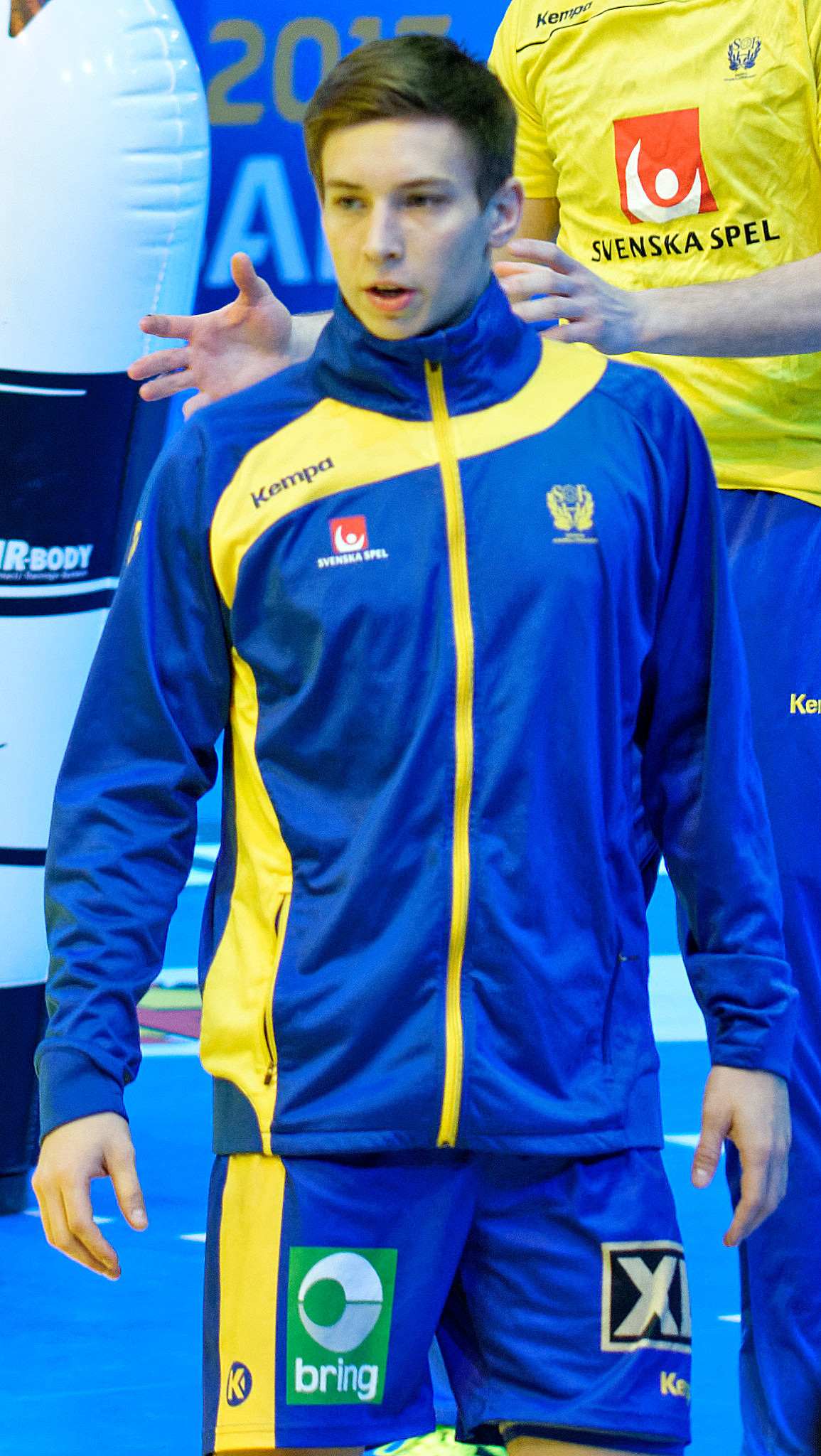

Personal information
- Nationality: Swedish
- Born: 13 September 1995 (age 31) Rimbo, Sweden
- Height: 1.82 m (6 ft 0 in)

Sport
- Sport: Handball
- Position: Left wing
- Current club: Ribe-Esbjerg HH

Senior clubs
- Years: Team
- –2014: HK Rimbo
- 2014–2017: IFK Kristianstad
- 2017–2021: Rhein-Neckar Löwen
- 2021–2023: GOG Håndbold
- 2023–2025: Füchse Berlin
- 2025–: Ribe-Esbjerg HH
National team
Years	Team	Apps	(Gls)
2016–2020	Sweden	71	(212)
Medal record
European Championship
Silver medal – second place	2018 Croatia

Jerry Tollbring (born 13 September 1995) is a Swedish handball player for Ribe-Esbjerg HH.

He participated at the 2016 European Men's Handball Championship.

With Füchse he won the 2024-25 Handball-Bundesliga, which was the first in club history. The same season he played in the 2024-25 EHF Champions League final, where Füchse lost to league rivals SC Magdeburg.

== Individual awards ==
- All-Star Left wing of the World Championship: 2017
- Danish League topscorer 2021-2022

== Personal life ==
He is the brother of fellow handballer Cassandra Tollbring. He is in a relationship with international handball player Nora Mørk. On 28 October 2024, they announced they were expecting their first child in May 2025.
