= Ida Bjørndalen Karlsson =

Norwegian handball player (born 1983)

Personal information
- Nationality: Norwegian
- Born: 6 May 1983 (age 43) Sarpsborg, Norway
- Height: 1.78 m (5 ft 10 in)

Sport
- Sport: Handball
- Position: Right back
- Current club: Team Esbjerg
- Number: 21

Senior clubs
- Years: Team
- –2005: Sola HK
- 2005–2007: Larvik HK
- 2007–2009: Viborg HK
- 2009–2014: KIF Vejen
- 2014–2018: Team Esbjerg
National team
Years	Team	Apps	(Gls)
2004–2014	Norway	35	(40)
Medal record
European Championship
Gold medal – first place	2014 Croatia/Hungary
Silver medal – second place	2012 Serbia

Ida Bjørndalen Karlsson (born 6 May 1983) is a former Norwegian handball player, who last played for Team Esbjerg. She made her debut for the Norwegian national team in 2004. She won the Champions League with Viborg HK in 2009. In 2016 she was part of the Team Esbjerg side that won the Danish Championship for the first time in club history. She had initially announced her retirement with the conclusion of the 2016–17 season but changed her mind.

== Individual awards ==
- Danish Handball League Top Scorer: 2018
