= Kungälvs HK =

Swedish handball club

- Full name: Kungälvs Handbollsklubb
- Founded: February 9, 1970; 56 years ago
- Arena: Mimershallen
- Capacity: 600
- President: Mikael Bengtsson
- Head coach: Hamed Khazrai
- League: Handbollsligan (women's team); Allsvenskan (men's team)
- 2024-25: 10th (women's team), 10th (men's team)
- Club colours
Home	Away

Kungälvs Handbollsklubb (Kungälvs HK) is a handball club based in Kungälv, Västra Götalands län, Sweden. It was founded on 9 February 1970. The club has 650 members.

The women's team played in the top division from 1998 to 2000 and again from 2004 to 2007. In 2018 they were promoted to the top flight again by winning the Allsvenskan. In the 2018-19 season they reached the Handbollsligan playoff for the first time, where they lost 3-0 in matches to Skuru IK.

== Team ==
=== Current squad ===
Squad for the 2025–26 season

Goalkeepers
Left Wingers
Right Wingers
Line players

Left Backs
Central Backs
Right Backs

=== Transfers ===
Transfers for the 2025–26 season

Joining

Leaving

- (Sweden) William Hermansson (LB) to (Sweden) Västerås HF

== Notable players ==
- Karin Almqvist
- Sofie Börjesson (2016–2019)
- Mia Lagumdzija (2020–)
- Clara Lerby (2015–2019)
- Charité Mumbongo (2019–2021)
- Ame Ogbomo (–2012, 2013–2014)
- Marie Wall (–2010, 2020–2022)
