= Cassandra Tollbring =

Swedish handball player (born 1993)

Personal information
- Nationality: Swedish
- Born: 19 March 1993 (age 33) Rimbo, Sweden
- Height: 1.70 m (5 ft 7 in)

Sport
- Sport: Handball
- Position: Left back
- Current club: H65 Höör

Senior clubs
- Years: Team
- –2012: Rimbo HK
- 2012–2014: Eslövs IK
- 2014–2017: H 65 Höör
- 2017–2019: Larvik HK
- 2019–2020: Bourg-de-Péage Drôme
- 2020–2022: Storhamar HE
- 2022–: H65 Höör
National team
Years	Team	Apps	(Gls)
2018–	Sweden	5	(15)

Cassandra Tollbring (born 19 March 1993) is a Swedish handballer who plays for H65 Höör and the Swedish national team.

== Honours ==
- Swedish League
  - Gold: 2016/2017
- EHF Challenge Cup:
  - Finalist: 2017
- Norwegian League
  - Silver: 2020/2021, 2021/2022
- Swedish Cup
  - Silver: 2022/2023

== Personal life ==
She is the sister of Jerry Tollbring.
