= Bavnehøj-Hallen =

Sports venue in Copenhagen, Denmark

Coordinates: 55°39′35″N 12°32′17″E

Bavnehøj-Hallen is an indoor sports arena in Copenhagen, Denmark primarily used for handball and volleyball. The arena is home to Danish Handball League side Ajax Heroes and the volleyball club Enghave Volleyballklub.
