= København Håndbold =

Danish handball club

- Full name: København Håndbold A/S
- Short name: KBH
- Founded: January 24, 2013; 13 years ago
- Arena: Frederiksberg-Hallerne
- Capacity: 1,400
- President: Louise Svalastog
- Head coach: Bo Spellerberg
- League: Bambusa Kvindeligaen
- 2025–26: 6th
- Club colours
| Home | Away |

København Håndbold is a Danish women's handball club from Copenhagen, Denmark. It was established in the winter of 2013. It took over the league licence from Frederiksberg IF and is playing in the Bambusa Kvindeligaen.

The club is owned by Kim Mikkelsen.

== History ==
The company behind the club was founded on January 24, 2013, and on February 16th they took over the licence of Frederiksberg IF, allowing them to play in the Danish Women's Handball League. FIF had just been promoted the season prior.

Their first season was the 2013–14 Damehåndboldligaen. The team finished 13th, one position above the relegation play off.

In the 2016-2017 season they reached the championship playoff for the first time, but lost the final to Nykøbing Falster Håndboldklub.

The club won the Danish Championship for the first time in the 2017/18 season, after first winning the first leg and later the decisive DM-finals against Odense Håndbold. The year before, the team had also played in their first domestic championship final, surprisingly beating FC Midtjylland Håndbold in the semi final.

In May 2025, just before the third place playoff match, the club announced that they had to significantly reduce the player budget going forward.

== Kits ==
AWAY
| 2016–18 | 2019–20 |

== Achievements ==
- Danish League:
  - Winner: 2018
  - Runners-Up: 2017
- Danish Cup
  - Runners-up: 2017
- Danish Super Cup:
  - Winner: 2018

== Team ==
=== Squad ===
Squad for the 2026–27 season

Goalkeepers

- 2 (Netherlands) Bianca Schanssema
- 16 (Denmark) Emilie Holst Firgaard

Wingers
LW

- 7 (Denmark) Emilie Ytting Pedersen
- 36 (Denmark) Kamilla Holm

RW

- 5 (Denmark) Clara Skøtt
- 18 (Denmark) Rosa Skovlund Schmidt

Line players

- 23 (Denmark) Astrid Grubbe Eising
- 47 (Denmark) Agnes Hvidsten

Back players
LB

- 11 (Denmark) Martha Nickelsen
- 27 (Denmark) Sofie Flader

CB

- 17 (Denmark) Line Berggren Larsen
- 21 (Faroe Islands) Maria Pálsdóttir Nólsoy

RB

- 24 (Netherlands) Maud Horvers

=== Technical staff ===
- Head Coach: Bo Spellerberg
- Assistant coach: Mikkel Thomassen
- Goalkeeping trainer: Marie Møller
- Team Leader: Mie Albertsen
- Team Leader: Line Bitsch Jensen
- Physiotherapist: Line Knutzon
- Physical trainer: Kasper Danborg

=== Transfers ===
Transfers for the season 2026-27

Joining

- (Denmark) Kamilla Holm (LW) (from (Denmark) BK Ydun)
- (Faroe Islands) Maria Pálsdóttir Nólsoy (LB) (from (Denmark) HH Elite)
- (Denmark) Rosa Skovlund Schmidt (RW) (from (Denmark) Viborg HK)
- (Denmark) Astrid Eising (P) (from (Denmark) Roskilde Håndbold)

Leaving

- (Denmark) Anna Mulbjerg (LW) (to ?)
- (Germany) Aimée von Pereira (LB) (retires)
- (Denmark) Alberte Hovgaard-Hansen (CB) (to (Denmark) NFH)
- (Denmark) Nikoline Lundgreen (RB) (to ?)
- (Montenegro) Anastasija Marsenić (RW) (to (Norway) Storhamar HE)
- (Denmark) Annika Meyer (P) (retires)

=== Former notable players ===
- (Denmark) Anne Mette Hansen
- (Denmark) Anne Mette Pedersen
- (Denmark) Marianne Bonde
- (Denmark) Pernille Holmsgaard
- (Denmark) Christina Krogshede
- (Denmark) Christina Elm
- (Denmark) Mie Augustesen
- (Denmark) Anne Cecilie de la Cour
- (Denmark) Sofie Bloch-Sørensen
- (Denmark) Celine Lundbye Kristiansen
- (Denmark) Josephine Touray
- (Denmark) Christina Pedersen
- (Denmark) Mia Møldrup
- (Denmark) Mai Kragballe Nielsen
- (Denmark) Mia Rej
- (Denmark) Louise Svalastog
- (Denmark) Stine Knudsen
- (Denmark) Annika Meyer
- (Denmark) Andrea Hansen
- (Denmark) Amalie Milling
- (Sweden) Jenny Alm
- (Sweden) Linn Blohm
- (Sweden) Edijana Dafe
- (Sweden) Marie Wall
- (Sweden) Hanna Blomstrand
- (Sweden) Johanna Bundsen
- (Sweden) Olivia Mellegård
- (Norway) Ine Karlsen Stangvik
- (Norway) Marie Tømmerbakke
- (Norway) Thea Mørk
- (Norway) Line Bjørnsen
- (Norway) Maria Hjertner
- (Norway) Karoline Lund
- (Netherlands) Myrthe Schoenaker
- (Netherlands) Kelly Dulfer
- (Netherlands) Debbie Bont
- (Netherlands) Larissa Nüsser
- (Poland) Paulina Uścinowicz
- (Germany) Aimée von Pereira
- (Germany) Katharina Filter
- (Germany) Silje Brøns Petersen
- (Faroe Islands) Pernille Brandenborg

=== Former coaches ===
- (Denmark) Martin Albertsen (2013–2014)
- (Norway) Reidar Møistad (2014–2016)
- (Denmark) Claus Mogensen (2016–2022)

== Kit manufacturers ==
- (Sweden) Salming Sports

== Arena ==
- Name: Frederiksberg-Hallerne
- Capacity: 1,200
- City: Frederiksberg, Copenhagen
- Used for: HTH Ligaen
- Address: Jens Jessens vej 20, 2000 Frederiksberg

== Statistics ==
=== Top scorers in the EHF Champions League ===
(All-Time) – Last updated on 2 October 2021

| Rank | Name | Seasons played | Goals |
|---|---|---|---|
| 1 | (Denmark) Mai Kragballe Nielsen | 1 | 43 |
| 2 | (Denmark) Louise Føns | 1 | 39 |
| 3 | (Denmark) Anne Cecilie de la Cour | 1 | 38 |
| 4 | (Netherlands) Kelly Dulfer | 1 | 34 |
| 5 | (Sweden) Jenny Alm | 1 | 32 |
| 6 | (Netherlands) Debbie Bont | 1 | 31 |
| 7 | (Sweden) Linn Blohm | 1 | 27 |
| 8 | (Sweden) Hanna Blomstrand | 1 | 27 |
| 9 | (Denmark) Maria Lykkegaard | 1 | 24 |
| 10 | (Norway) Thea Mørk | 1 | 20 |

=== Club awards ===
==== Player of the year ====
- (Denmark) Søs Søby (2014)
- (Denmark) Anne Mette Hansen (2015)
- (Denmark) Mia Rej (2015)
- (Denmark) Mia Rej (2016)
- (Denmark) Mia Rej (2017)
- (Denmark) Mia Rej (2018)
- (Netherlands) Kelly Dulfer (2019)
- (Netherlands) Larissa Nüsser (2020)
- (Netherlands) Larissa Nüsser (2021)
- (Denmark) Maria Lykkegaard (2022)
- (Denmark) Stine Jørgensen (2023)

==== Topscorers ====
- (Denmark) Mie Augustesen (88 goals) (2013–2014)
- (Denmark) Anne Mette Hansen (114 goals) (2014–2015)
- (Denmark) Mia Rej (92 goals) (2015–2016)
- (Denmark) Mia Rej (154 goals) (2016–2017)
- (Denmark) Mia Rej (176 goals) (2017–2018)
- (Sweden) Jenny Alm (133 goals) (2018–2019)
- (Denmark) Mia Rej (179 goals) (2019–2020)
- (Netherlands) Larissa Nüsser (124 goals) (2020–2021)
- (Sweden) Melissa Petrén (157 goals) (2021–2022)
- (Denmark) Stine Jørgensen (182 goals) (2022–2023)
