= Sofie Bæk Andersen =

Danish handball player (born 1994)

Personal information
- Full name: Sofie Bæk Andersen
- Nationality: Danish
- Born: 15 January 1994 (age 32) Aarhus, Denmark
- Height: 1.78 m (5 ft 10 in)

Sport
- Sport: Handball
- Position: Left back
- Current club: Silkeborg-Voel KFUM
- Number: 23

Senior clubs
- Years: Team
- 2010–2012: Midtjylland Håndbold
- 2012–2014: SønderjyskE Håndbold
- 2014–2015: Skive fH
- 2015–2023: Silkeborg-Voel KFUM
National team
Years	Team	Apps	(Gls)
2010–2013	Denmark youth teams	28	(57)
Medal record
European Junior Championship
Bronze medal – third place	2013 Denmark

Sofie Bæk Andersen (born 15 January 1994) is a female Danish former handball player who played for Silkeborg-Voel KFUM, Midtjylland Håndbold, SønderjyskE Håndbold and Skive fH.

Today she is a handball expert on the Danish TV-station TV2.
