= Ajax København =

Danish handball club

- Full name: Ajax København Håndbold
- Short name: Ajax
- Founded: May 2, 1934; 92 years ago
- Arena: Bavnehøj-Hallen
- Capacity: 1,000
- President: Flemming Thomsen
- Head coach: Rasmus Poulsen (women); Mathias Albrektsen (men)
- League: 1st Division (women); 3rd Division (men)
- 2025–26: 2nd (women)
- Club colours
Home	Away

Ajax København is a handball club based in southwestern Copenhagen, Denmark, consisting of both a women's and a men's team. As of the 2025–26 season, the women's team compete in 1st Division, the second highest women's league in Denmark. The men's team went bankrupt in 2022, and were therefore relegated to the 3rd Division, the fourth tier of Danish handball. Ajax København play their home matches in Bavnehøj-Hallen.

== History ==
=== Formation and initial success, 1934–1970 ===
The club was founded as Idrætsforeningen Ajax on May 2, 1934. The club has its roots in the prior club Poloklubben af 1908. P08 was, as the name suggests, primarily a water polo team, but also had among other sports, a handball team. Due to the growing popularity of handball, the club board decided close their handball team over fears, that it would overshadow the polo team. This caused the members, who had an interest in handball to break away and create IF Ajax.

In the beginning the club had both a field handball team, a swimming team and a water polo team. The handball team started playing competitive matches in January 1935. Two years after they won first the Copenhagen championship, which qualified the team for the inter-region playoff, the progenitor to the Danish championship. They would go on to win this tournament, marking their first Danish championship. In 1942 the club became purely a handball team, and the other teams were closed.

In the following decades, the men's team took home 9 Danish championships – the most recent in 1964. The year after they reached the semifinal of the EHF Cup.

=== The women's team and the merger with KI, 1970–1997 ===
For many years the team was exclusively a men's club. This changed in 1989 when they merged with the women's only Kvindelig Idrætsforening. Before the merger KI had been one of the strongest women's team with 7 national championships and several famous Danish national team players. The women's team started in the third tier, and over a period of nine years they worked their way up to the top flight, Damehåndboldligaen, where they played in 1997-98 and 1998–99. They were however relegated after two years in the top flight.

During the 1970s and 1980s the team played most years in either the second or third tier. In 1993 they returned to the First Division, being coached by former Danish national team coach Leif Mikkelsen. In 1997 they reached the final of the Danish Championship, but was beaten by Virum-Sorgenfri HK.

=== Ajax Farum and economic difficulties, 1997–2010 ===
In the late 1990s both teams were relegated, as it was hard to find sponsors in Copenhagen.

From 2000 to 2003 the team entered a cooperation with Farum Håndbold Forening, a handball club from Farum, Nordsjælland. The team competed under the name Ajax Farum and home matches were played in Farum Arena. In this three-year period the men's team played a single season in the top Danish league, Herrehåndboldligaen, while the women's team were playing play off matches to be promoted to the Damehåndboldligaen. In 2003 the project was abandoned, and the clubs split up, because of a lack of sponsorship money. Ajax returned to play their home matches at Bavnehøj-Hallen.

From 2006 to 2008 the team went under the name Ajax Heroes.

In 2009 the club was accused of paying their coach Christian Dalmose cash-in-hand, by the former managing director at the club, Harry Dalsø. The case was put forward to Danish Handball Federation. A year later the case was dropped, as Dalsø had not put forward sufficient proof of his accusations. The same season the club was relegated, when they finished last in the Danish league.

=== 2010–present day ===
In 2012 the men's team managed to reached the final four of the Danish Men's Handball Cup, while playing in the 2nd Division, the third tier of Danish handball. They are the only team who has managed to do so. They did however lose 25–29 to the reigning champions and city rivals AG København.

In March 2017 women's team was promoted to the Damehåndboldligaen again. The team were however relegated again the year after. In 2022 team again played a season in the Danish top division. Their coach at the time, Dennis Bo Jensen, won the 'coach of the year' award for the 2020-2021 season.

In September 2022 it became publicly known, that the players on Ajax' men's team had not been paid their due wages for the previous month. This made several players criticize the board publicly. The team played in the 1st Division at the time. The chairperson, Henrik Ritlov, explained that the club had missed the deadline, because they had to repay a loan of 900,000 Danish Kroner to the Danish tax authorities. This meant that by October 1 several players were free to unilaterally terminate their contracts. This meant that on October 8 the team could not field a field a team, when they had to play Team Sydhavsøerne away in the 1st Division. Leading up to the game the team only had 6 first team players left, and minutes before the game started, 2 of Ajax' players decided to refuse to play in protest of the board's management.

On October 11th, 2022 the club was declared bankrupt in the Maritime and Commercial Court in Copenhagen. The men's team were relegated to the 3rd division, the fourth tier of Danish handball. The women's team were however unaffected, as they were technically a separate company.

In the 2023-24 season Ajax København went an entire season in the Damehåndboldligaen without gaining a single point, losing 26 out of 26 games.

== Women's team ==
=== Kits ===
HOME
2017–18	2018–20

=== Current squad ===
Squad for the 2025–26 season

Goalkeepers

- 1 (Denmark) Alma-Olivia Berggren Ubbe
- 16 (Denmark) Karoline Makne

Wingers
LW

- 19 (France) Alice Mazens
- 88 (Denmark) Lærke Marie Hrenczuk

RW

- 6 (Denmark) Anndora Liane Dambo
- 9 (Denmark) Rikke Vorgaard
- 20 (Denmark) Ellen Weber

Line players

- 5 (Faroe Islands) Vár Bentsdóttir Zachariasen
- 14 (Denmark) Amalie Høeg Vinther
- 18 (Denmark) Nikoline Høgsland
- 86 (Denmark) Simone Frahm
- 87 (Denmark) Andrea Münster Schrøder

Back players
LB

- 7 (Denmark) Sofie Sander
- 23 (Denmark) Laura Skytte
- 25 (Serbia) Milica Djukic
- 28 (Denmark) Mathilde Wollesen

CB

- 8 (Denmark) Emilie Schjellerup
- 27 (Denmark) Natascha Wollesen

RB

- 10 (Denmark) Leah Bechar Westerberg
- 17 (Faroe Islands) Lív Bentsdóttir Zachariasen
- 22 (Faroe Islands) Elsa Egholm

=== Transfers ===
Transfers for the season 2026-27

Joining

- (Norway) Julie Søfting Tovslid (GK) (from (Norway) Romerike Ravens)
- (Norway) Guro Berland Husebø (LW) (from (Germany) Borussia Dortmund Handball)
- (Denmark) Isabella Jensen (LB) (from (Denmark) Gudme HK)
- (Serbia) Milica Djukic (LB) (from youth team)
- (Faroe Islands) Silja Geirsdóttir Eystberg (CB) (from (Faroe Islands) Kyndil)
- (Denmark) Thea Frejlev Merrild (RW) (from (Denmark) TMS Ringsted)
- (Denmark) Cecilie Engel (RW) (from youth team)
- (Denmark) Andrea Münster Schrøder (P) (from youth team)
- (Denmark) Emilia Arrøe (P) (from (Denmark) Gudme HK)

Leaving

- (France) Alice Mazens (LW) (to (France) ?)
- (Denmark) Laura Skytte (LB) (to (Denmark) Skanderborg Håndbold)
- (Faroe Islands) Elsa Egholm (LB) (to ?)
- (Denmark) Rikke Vorgaard (RW) (retires)
- (Denmark) Ellen Weber (RW) (break from handball)
- (Denmark) Nikoline Høgsland (P) (to (Denmark) Roskilde Håndbold)

=== Staff ===
Pos.	Name
Head Coach	(Denmark) Martin Grønmann
Assistant coach	(Denmark) Mathias Brandt
Team Leader	(Denmark) Birgit Christiansen
Physiotherapist	(Denmark) Amanda Turay
Physiotherapist	(Denmark) Peter Jeppesen
Video man	(Denmark) Flemming Jensen
CEO	(Denmark) Michael Pallisgaard

== Men's team ==
=== Accomplishments Men ===
- Danish Handball League: 9
  - 1937, 1942, 1944, 1948, 1949, 1950, 1952, 1953, 1964
- Danish Men's Handball Cup

Winners (1): 1963–64
