= 2002 Malmö FF season =

Malmö FF
2002 season
- Chairman: (Sweden) Bengt Madsen
- Manager: (Sweden) Tom Prahl
- Stadium: Malmö Stadion
- Allsvenskan: 2nd
- Svenska Cupen: Semi-finals
- Top goalscorer: Peter Ijeh (24)
| Home colours | Away colours |

Malmö FF competed in Allsvenskan and Svenska Cupen for the 2002 season.

== Players ==
=== Squad stats ===
| No. | Pos | Nat | Player | Total | | Allsvenskan | | |
|---|---|---|---|---|---|---|---|---|
| No. | Pos | Nat | Player | Apps | Goals | Apps | Goals | Signed from |
| 1 | GK | (Scotland) SCO | Lee Baxter | 10 | 0 | 10 | 0 | |
| 2 | DF | (Sweden) SWE | Jörgen Ohlsson | 21 | 5 | 21 | 5 | |
| 4 | DF | (Sweden) SWE | Daniel Majstorović | 24 | 4 | 24 | 4 | |
| 5 | DF | (Sweden) SWE | Mikael Roth | 18 | 0 | 18 | 0 | |
| 6 | MF | (Sweden) SWE | Hasse Mattisson | 23 | 3 | 23 | 3 | |
| 7 | DF | (Cameroon) CMR | Joseph Elanga | 23 | 1 | 23 | 1 | |
| 8 | MF | (Denmark) DEN | Peter Sørensen | 12 | 0 | 12 | 0 | |
| 9 | FW | (Sweden) SWE | Niklas Skoog | 23 | 9 | 23 | 9 | |
| 10 | FW | (Sweden) SWE | Mats Lilienberg | 4 | 0 | 4 | 0 | |
| 11 | MF | (Sweden) SWE | Erik Johansson | 26 | 3 | 26 | 3 | |
| 13 | DF | (Sweden) SWE | Jon Jönsson | 10 | 0 | 10 | 0 | |
| 14 | DF | (Iceland) ISL | Gudmundur Mete | 14 | 0 | 14 | 0 | |
| 15 | DF | (Sweden) SWE | Matias Concha | 15 | 0 | 15 | 0 | |
| 17 | FW | (Sweden) SWE | Markus Rosenberg | 11 | 0 | 11 | 0 | |
| 18 | FW | (Nigeria) NGA | Peter Ijeh | 23 | 24 | 23 | 24 | |
| 19 | MF | (Sweden) SWE | Kenneth Gustafsson | 2 | 0 | 2 | 0 | |
| 21 | FW | (Sweden) SWE | Andreas Yngvesson | 21 | 3 | 21 | 3 | |
| 22 | DF | (Denmark) DEN | Jeppe Vestergaard | 4 | 0 | 4 | 0 | |
| 23 | MF | (Denmark) DEN | Brian Steen Nielsen | 14 | 0 | 14 | 0 | |
| 24 | DF | (Finland) FIN | Jussi Nuorela | 15 | 0 | 15 | 0 | |
| 25 | MF | (Sweden) SWE | Billy Berntsson | 4 | 0 | 4 | 0 | |
| 28 | GK | (Sweden) SWE | Mattias Asper | 16 | 0 | 16 | 0 | |
| 29 | DF | (Sweden) SWE | Olof Persson | 13 | 0 | 13 | 0 | |

== Competitions ==
=== Allsvenskan ===
==== League table ====
| Pos | Team | Pld | W | D | L | GF | GA | GD | Pts | Qualification or relegation |
|---|---|---|---|---|---|---|---|---|---|---|
| 1 | Djurgårdens IF (C) | 26 | 16 | 4 | 6 | 51 | 33 | +18 | 52 | Qualification to Champions League second qualifying round |
| 2 | Malmö FF | 26 | 14 | 4 | 8 | 52 | 32 | +20 | 46 | Qualification to UEFA Cup qualifying round |
| 3 | Örgryte IS | 26 | 12 | 8 | 6 | 49 | 38 | +11 | 44 | Qualification to Intertoto Cup first round |
| 4 | Helsingborgs IF | 26 | 10 | 8 | 8 | 38 | 38 | 0 | 38 | |
| 5 | AIK | 26 | 9 | 10 | 7 | 35 | 38 | −3 | 37 | Qualification to UEFA Cup qualifying round (Note: AIK qualified for the UEFA Cup as Svenska Cupen runners-up 2002.) |

Source: svenskfotboll.se (in Swedish)
Rules for classification: 1) points; 2) goal difference; 3) number of goals scored.
(C) Champions

==== Matches ====
| 8 April 2002 Round 1 | Malmö FF | 1 – 2 | Djurgårdens IF | Malmö |
| | Skoog 87' (pen.) | | Chanko 31'; Källström 55' | Stadium: Malmö Stadion; Attendance: 15 797 |

| 13 April 2002 Round 2 | IFK Norrköping | 0 – 3 | Malmö FF | Norrköping |
| | | | Johansson 70'; Ijeh 88', 90 + 1' | Stadium: Idrottsparken; Attendance: 12 149 |

| 21 April 2002 Round 3 | Malmö FF | 0 – 1 | Örgryte IS | Malmö |
| | | | Anegrund 22' | Stadium: Malmö Stadion; Attendance: 8 070 |

| 29 April 2002 Round 4 | Hammarby IF | 3 – 1 | Malmö FF | Stockholm |
| | Kennedy 19'; Hermansson 51'; Markstedt 87' | | Ijeh 34' | Stadium: Söderstadion; Attendance: 11 054 |

| 3 May 2002 Round 5 | Malmö FF | 4 – 0 | Kalmar FF | Malmö |
| | Mattisson 30'; Ijeh 56', 61'; Ohlsson 80' | | | Stadium: Malmö Stadion; Attendance: 7 447 |

| 7 May 2002 Round 6 | Helsingborgs IF | 2 – 3 | Malmö FF | Helsingborg |
| | Santos 41'; Priča 56' | | Skoog 7'; Ijeh 48', 83' | Stadium: Olympia; Attendance: 15 107 |

| 13 May 2002 Round 7 | AIK | 1 – 2 | Malmö FF | Solna |
| | Tamandi 41' | | Ohlsson 14'; Ijeh 70' | Stadium: Råsunda; Attendance: 17 994 |

| 4 July 2002 Round 8 | Malmö FF | 2 – 1 | Halmstads BK | Malmö |
| | Mattisson 15'; Ijeh 76' | | Ekström 22' | Stadium: Malmö Stadion; Attendance: 11 045 |

| 7 July 2002 Round 9 | Malmö FF | 4 – 1 | Örebro SK | Malmö |
| | Ijeh 24'; Ohlsson 62'; Skoog 82', 87' | | Maruti 28' | Stadium: Malmö Stadion; Attendance: 8 785 |

| 14 July 2002 Round 10 | Malmö FF | 0 – 2 | GIF Sundsvall | Malmö |
| | | | Thorsell 37'; Bergersen 54' | Stadium: Malmö Stadion; Attendance: 9 051 |

| 23 July 2002 Round 11 | IFK Göteborg | 0 – 4 | Malmö FF | Gothenburg |
| | | | Yngvesson 11'; Ijeh 15', 49'; Johansson 76' | Stadium: Gamla Ullevi; Attendance: 10 471 |

| 29 July 2002 Round 12 | Malmö FF | 2 – 1 | Landskrona BoIS | Malmö |
| | Ijeh 43', 81' | | Farnerud 62' | Stadium: Malmö Stadion; Attendance: 24 570 |

| 4 August 2002 Round 13 | IF Elfsborg | 2 – 1 | Malmö FF | Borås |
| | Drugge 28', 37' | | Johansson 63' | Stadium: Ryavallen; Attendance: 6 359 |

| 7 August 2002 Round 14 | Malmö FF | 3 – 2 | IFK Norrköping | Malmö |
| | Ijeh 2'; Skoog 40'; Yngvesson 51' | | Ström 26'; Wallerstedt 48' | Stadium: Malmö Stadion; Attendance: 12 054 |

| 11 August 2002 Round 15 | Djurgårdens IF | 3 – 4 | Malmö FF | Stockholm |
| | A. Johansson 8', 90 + 1'; Källström 55' | | Ijeh 4', 13', 16'; Majstorović 32' | Stadium: Stockholms Stadion; Attendance: 13 130 |

| 17 August 2002 Round 16 | Örgryte IS | 2 – 2 | Malmö FF | Gothenburg |
| | Aubynn 7'; Karlsson 62' | | Skoog 36', 61' | Stadium: Gamla Ullevi; Attendance: 9 090 |

| 24 August 2002 Round 17 | Malmö FF | 1 – 1 | Hammarby IF | Malmö |
| | Ohlsson 61' | | Piñones Arce 45' | Stadium: Malmö Stadion; Attendance: 12 540 |

| 2 September 2002 Round 18 | Kalmar FF | 0 – 3 | Malmö FF | Kalmar |
| | | | Elanga 72'; Skoog 82'; Mattisson 90 + 1' | Stadium: Fredriksskans; Attendance: 6 369 |

| 11 September 2002 Round 19 | Malmö FF | 0 – 2 | Helsingborgs IF | Malmö |
| | | | Santos 54'; Andersson 90 + 2' | Stadium: Malmö Stadion; Attendance: 24 061 |

| 15 September 2002 Round 20 | Malmö FF | 4 – 2 | IFK Göteborg | Malmö |
| | Ijeh 14', 22'; Majstorović 27'; Skoog 47' | | Samura 10'; Mild 77' | Stadium: Malmö Stadion; Attendance: 11 972 |

| 21 September 2002 Round 21 | Landskrona BoIS | 0 – 1 | Malmö FF | Landskrona |
| | | | Ohlsson 70' | Stadium: Landskrona IP; Attendance: 10 127 |

| 1 October 2002 Round 22 | Örebro SK | 2 – 2 | Malmö FF | Örebro |
| | Brekkan 30'; Kuhi 88' | | Ijeh 13', 16' | Stadium: Eyravallen; Attendance: 10 474 |

| 6 October 2002 Round 23 | GIF Sundsvall | 1 – 0 | Malmö FF | Sundsvall |
| | Bergersen 33' | | | Stadium: Idrottsparken; Attendance: 7 774 |

| 22 October 2002 Round 24 | Malmö FF | 0 – 0 | IF Elfsborg | Malmö |
| | | | | Stadium: Malmö Stadion; Attendance: 11 362 |

| 28 October 2002 Round 25 | Malmö FF | 5 – 0 | AIK | Malmö |
| | Ijeh 10', 90 + 2'; Majstorović 39', 61'; Yngvesson 77' | | | Stadium: Malmö Stadion; Attendance: 12 997 |

| 2 November 2002 Round 26 | Halmstads BK | 1 – 0 | Malmö FF | Halmstad |
| | Touma 59' | | | Stadium: Örjans Vall; Attendance: 10 552 |

== Club ==
=== Kit ===
Supplier: Puma
Sponsor(s): Nätverket

| Home; Domestic | Away; Domestic |

Source: Malmö FF

=== Other information ===
| Chairman | (Sweden) Bengt Madsen |
| Ground (capacity and dimensions) | Malmö Stadion (27,500 / ) |

Updated to match played 19 October
Source: Malmö FF and Malmö Stadion
