= Kristine Breistøl =

Norwegian handball player (born 1993)

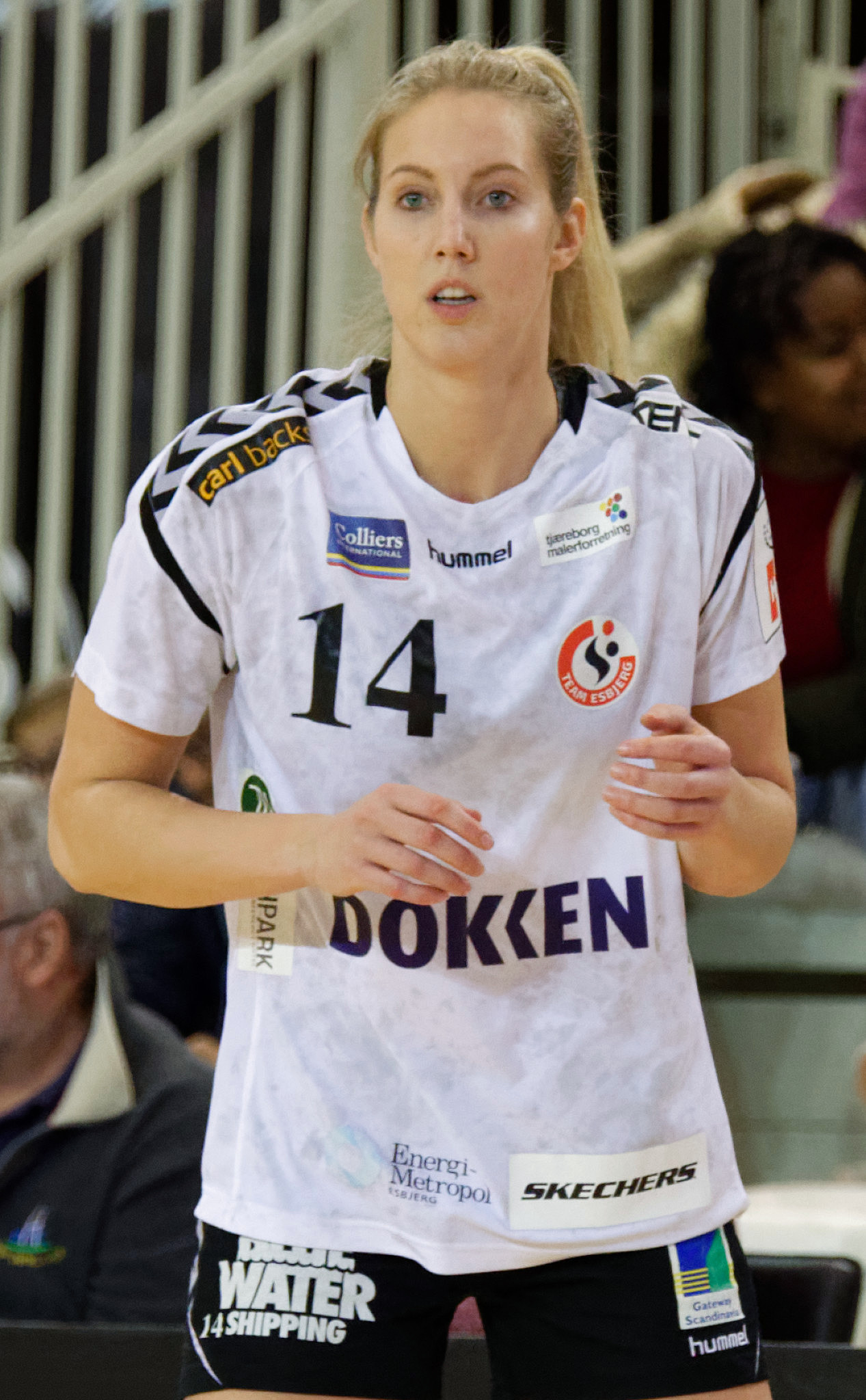
- Breistøl in 2018

Personal information
- Nationality: Norwegian
- Born: 23 August 1993 (age 33) Oslo, Norway
- Height: 1.93 m (6 ft 4 in)

Sport
- Sport: Handball
- Position: Left back
- Current club: Győri ETO KC
- Number: 14

Youth career
- Years: Team
- –: Bækkelaget

Senior clubs
- Years: Team
- 2009–2012: Bækkelaget
- 2012–2018: Larvik HK
- 2018–2024: Team Esbjerg
- 2024–: Győri ETO KC
National team
| Years | Team | Apps | (Gls) |
| 2016– | Norway | 126 | (226) |
Medal record
Olympic Games
| Gold medal – first place | 2024 Paris | Team |
| Bronze medal – third place | 2020 Tokyo | Team |
World Championship
| Gold medal – first place | 2021 Spain |
| Gold medal – first place | 2025 Germany/Netherlands |
| Silver medal – second place | 2023 Denmark/Norway/Sweden |
European Championship
| Gold medal – first place | 2020 Denmark |
| Gold medal – first place | 2022 Slovenia/North Macedonia/Montenegro |
| Gold medal – first place | 2024 Austria/Hungary/Switzerland |

Kristine Breistøl (born 23 August 1993) is a Norwegian handball player for Győri ETO KC and the Norwegian national team.

== Career ==
Breistøl started her career at Bækkelaget. In the 2011-12 season, they played in the second tier of Norwegian handball, where Breistøl scored 163 goals during the season. This prompted a move to Norwegian top club Larvik HK. Here she won the 2013, 2014, 2015, 2016, and 2017 Norwegian championships. In the 2012-13 Champions League she reached the final, where they lost to Hungarian Győr.

In 2018, she joined Danish side Team Esbjerg. Here she won the 2018-19, 2019-20, 2022-23 and 2023-24 Danish championships and the 2011 and 2022 Danish cup.

For the 2024-25 season, she joined Hungarian Győri ETO KC.

=== National team ===
Breistøl played 37 matches for the Norwegian Junior national team. represented Norway in the 2011 Women's Junior European Handball Championship, placing 12th, and in the 2012 Women's Junior World Handball Championship, placing 8th. She played 37 matches and scored 100 goals for Norway's junior team.

She made her debut for the Norwegian senior team on 6 October 2016 against France. Her first major international tournament was the 2019 World Championship. She was not initially part of the team, but was called in to replace Helene Fauske.

A year later, she was part of the Norwegian team that won the 2020 European Championship. A year after she won bronze medals at the 2021 Olympics. Breistøl scored 11 goals during the tournament.

She won the 2021 World Championship with the Norwegian team.

At the 2022 European Championship, she successfully defended her European title, when Norway won gold. During the tournament she scored 18 goals. A year later, she won silver medals at the 2023 World Championship, losing to France in the final. During the tournament, she scored 8 goals.

At the 2024 Olympics, she won gold medals with the Norwegian team. Later that year she won the 2024 European Championship, beating Denmark in the final.

At the 2025 World Championship she was part of the Norwegian team that won World Cup gold medals.

== Personal life ==
Her cousin Sara Breistøl was also a handball player for Larvik HK.

== Achievements ==
- Olympic Games:
  - Winner: 2024
  - Bronze: 2020
- World Championship:
  - Winner: 2021, 2025
- European Championship:
  - Winner: 2020, 2022, 2024

=== European ===
- EHF Champions League:
  - Winner: 2025
  - Bronze medalist: 2023/2024
- EHF Cup:
  - Finalist: 2019
- Norwegian Championship:
  - Winner: 2012/2013, 2013/2014, 2014/2015, 2015/2016
- Norwegian Cup:
  - Winner: 2013, 2014, 2015, 2016
- Danish League:
  - Gold Medalist: 2019, 2020, 2023, 2024
- Danish Cup:
  - Gold Medalist: 2021, 2022
  - Bronze Medalist: 2018
