= 2023–24 Kvindeligaen (handball) =

Kvindeligaen
- Season: 2023–24
- Champions: Team Esbjerg
- Relegated: Ajax København
- Champions League: Team Esbjerg; NFH; Odense Håndbold
- EHF European League: Ikast Håndbold
- Matches: 182
- Goals: 10,642 (58.47 per match)
- Top goalscorer: Line Gyldenløve (243)
- Longest winning run: Esbjerg 33
- Longest unbeaten run: Esbjerg 36
- Longest winless run: Ajax 26
- Longest losing run: Ajax 26

The 2023–24 Kvindeligaen was the 88th season of Kvindeligaen, Denmark's premier women's handball league. Team Esbjerg were the defending champions, while Bjerringbro FH was promoted from the 1. division for the first time in club history.

Team Esbjerg won the tournament after beating Nykøbing Falster Håndboldklub in the final 2–0 in matches. Ajax København were relegated to the 1st Division after not gaining a single point throughout the entire season.

== Team information ==
Locations of the 2023–24 Damehåndboldligaen

| Team. | Town | Arena | Capacity |
|---|---|---|---|
| Aarhus United | Aarhus | Ceres Arena Stadionhal | 1.200 |
| Ajax København | København | Bavnehøj-Hallen | 1,000 |
| Herning-Ikast Håndbold | Ikast | IBF Arena | 2,850 |
| HH Elite | Horsens | Forum Horsens | 4,000 |
| København Håndbold | København | Frederiksberghallen | 1,468 |
| Nykøbing Falster Håndboldklub | Nykøbing Falster | Spar Nord Arena | 1,300 |
| Odense Håndbold | Odense | Sydbank Arena | 2,256 |
| Bjerringbro FH | Bjerringbro | Bjerringbro Idrætscenter | 800 |
| Silkeborg-Voel KFUM | Silkeborg | Jysk Arena | 3,000 |
| Skanderborg Håndbold | Skanderborg | Skanderborg Fælled | 1,700 |
| Team Esbjerg | Esbjerg | Blue Water Dokken | 2,549 |
| SønderjyskE | Aabenraa | Arena Aabenraa | 1,400 |
| Ringkøbing Håndbold | Ringkøbing | Green Sports Arena | 1,200 |
| Viborg HK | Viborg | BioCirc Arena | 3,000 |

=== Personnel and kits ===
| Club | Manager | Captain | Kit manufacturer |
|---|---|---|---|
| Ringkøbing Håndbold | (Denmark) Jesper Holmris | (Denmark) Jane Mejlvang | (Denmark) Hummel |
| Team Esbjerg | (Denmark) Jesper Jensen | (Denmark) Kathrine Heindahl | (Denmark) Hummel |
| SønderjyskE | (Denmark) Peter Nielsen | | (Denmark) Hummel |
| Silkeborg-Voel KFUM | (Denmark) Peter Schilling Laursen | (Denmark) Stine Bonde | (Germany) Adidas |
| HH Elite | (Denmark) Claus Mogensen | (Denmark) Laura Damgaard | (Denmark) Hummel |
| Ikast Håndbold | (Denmark) Kasper Christensen | (Norway) Stine Skogrand | (Denmark) Select Sport |
| Odense Håndbold | (Norway) Ole Gustav Gjekstad | (Norway) Maren Nyland Aardahl | (Sweden) Craft |
| Ajax København | (Denmark) Kasper Andersen | | (Germany) Adidas |
| Skanderborg Håndbold | (Denmark) Jeppe Vestergaard | | (Germany) Puma |
| Aarhus United | (Denmark) Ole Bukholt Jensen | (Denmark) Emma Mogensen | (Denmark) H2O Sportswear |
| Nykøbing Falster Håndboldklub | (Greenland) Jakob Larsen | (Denmark) Kristina Kristiansen | (Germany) Puma |
| Bjerringbro FH | (Denmark) Jesper Banghøi | (Denmark) Line Gyldenløve | (Germany) Adidas |
| Viborg HK | (Denmark) Ole Bitsch | (Denmark) Maria Fisker | (Germany) Puma |
| København Håndbold | (Denmark) Rasmus Overby | (Germany) Silje Brøns Petersen | (Spain) Kelme |

== Regular season ==
=== Standings ===
| Pos | Team | Pld | W | D | L | GF | GA | GD | Pts | Qualification or relegation |
|---|---|---|---|---|---|---|---|---|---|---|
| 1 | Team Esbjerg | 26 | 26 | 0 | 0 | 882 | 647 | +235 | 52 | Championship play-offs + advance to Champions League |
| 2 | Ikast Håndbold | 26 | 23 | 0 | 3 | 905 | 686 | +219 | 46 | Championship play-offs |
| 3 | Odense Håndbold | 26 | 22 | 0 | 4 | 887 | 651 | +236 | 44 | Championship play-offs |
| 4 | Nykøbing Falster Håndbold | 26 | 18 | 0 | 8 | 776 | 710 | +66 | 36 | Championship play-offs |
| 5 | Silkeborg-Voel KFUM | 26 | 14 | 0 | 12 | 754 | 795 | −41 | 28 | Championship play-offs |
| 6 | København Håndbold | 26 | 14 | 0 | 12 | 793 | 757 | +36 | 28 | Championship play-offs |
| 7 | Viborg HK | 26 | 13 | 0 | 13 | 777 | 768 | +9 | 26 | Championship play-offs |
| 8 | SønderjyskE | 26 | 10 | 3 | 13 | 737 | 733 | +4 | 23 | Championship play-offs |
| 9 | Skanderborg Håndbold | 26 | 11 | 1 | 14 | 776 | 790 | −14 | 23 | |
| 10 | Ringkøbing Håndbold | 26 | 8 | 3 | 15 | 731 | 826 | −95 | 19 | |
| 11 | Aarhus United | 26 | 8 | 0 | 18 | 645 | 729 | −84 | 16 | |
| 12 | HH Elite | 26 | 7 | 1 | 18 | 748 | 850 | −102 | 15 | |
| 13 | Bjerringbro FH | 26 | 3 | 2 | 21 | 657 | 853 | −196 | 8 | |
| 14 | Ajax København | 26 | 0 | 0 | 26 | 574 | 847 | −273 | 0 | Relegation to 1. division |

Rules for classification: 1.) Points in head-to-head matches amongst tied teams; 2.) Goal difference in head-to-head matches amongst tied teams; 3.) Goals scored in head-to-head matches among tied teams; 4.) Points in all matches; 5.) Goal difference in all matches.

== Play off ==
=== Pot 1 ===
| Pos | Team | Pld | W | D | L | GF | GA | GD | Pts | Qualification |
|---|---|---|---|---|---|---|---|---|---|---|
| 1 | Team Esbjerg (Note: Including 2 bonus points) | 6 | 6 | 0 | 0 | 202 | 143 | +59 | 14 | Semifinals |
| 2 | Nykøbing Falster Håndboldklub (Note: including 1 bonus point) | 6 | 2 | 1 | 3 | 155 | 158 | −3 | 6 | Semifinals |
| 3 | SønderjyskE Damehåndbold | 6 | 2 | 0 | 4 | 163 | 189 | −26 | 4 | |
| 4 | Silkeborg-Voel KFUM | 6 | 1 | 1 | 4 | 164 | 194 | −30 | 3 | |

=== Pot 2 ===
| Pos | Team | Pld | W | D | L | GF | GA | GD | Pts | Qualification |
|---|---|---|---|---|---|---|---|---|---|---|
| 1 | Odense Håndbold (Note: Including 1 bonus points) | 6 | 5 | 1 | 0 | 192 | 170 | +22 | 12 | Semifinals |
| 2 | Ikast Håndbold (Note: Including 2 bonus point) | 6 | 3 | 1 | 2 | 183 | 172 | +11 | 9 | Semifinals |
| 3 | København Håndbold | 6 | 3 | 0 | 3 | 203 | 201 | +2 | 6 | |
| 4 | Viborg HK | 6 | 0 | 0 | 6 | 170 | 205 | −35 | 0 | |

=== Playoff ===
==== Semi final ====
| Date | | | Home team - Match 1 | Home team - Match 2 | Result | | |
| 1st match | 2nd match | 3rd match | Home team - Match 1 | Home team - Match 2 | 1st match | 2nd match | 3rd match |
|---|---|---|---|---|---|---|---|
| 11.05 | 15.05 | | Team Esbjerg | Ikast Håndbold | 35-24 | 33-33 | |
| 12.05 | 15.05 | 18.05 | Odense Håndbold | Nykøbing Falster Håndboldklub | 39-21 | 29-33 | 28-29 |

- The match is decided in best of 3. If the result is even after 2 matches, a third match is played.

==== Third place playoff ====
| Date | | Home team - Match 1 IBF Arena | Home team - Match 2 Sydbank Arena | Result | |
| 1st match | 2nd match | Home team - Match 1 IBF Arena | Home team - Match 2 Sydbank Arena | 1st match | 2nd match |
|---|---|---|---|---|---|
| 21.05 | 25.05 | Ikast Håndbold | Odense Håndbold | 27-29 | 30-33 |

- The match is decided in best of 3. If the result is even after 2 matches, a third match is played.

=== Final ===
| Date | | Home team - Match 1 Blue Water Dokken | Home team - Match 2 Spar Nord Arena | Result | |
| 1st match | 2nd match | Home team - Match 1 Blue Water Dokken | Home team - Match 2 Spar Nord Arena | 1st match | 2nd match |
|---|---|---|---|---|---|
| 21.05 | 25.05 | Team Esbjerg | Nykøbing Falster Håndboldklub | 35-20 | 25-20 |

- The match is decided in best of 3. If the result is even after 2 matches, a third match is played.

=== Relegation table ===
| Pos | Team | Pld | W | D | L | GF | GA | GD | Pts | Qualification |
|---|---|---|---|---|---|---|---|---|---|---|
| 1 | Skanderborg Håndbold | 4 | 4 | 0 | 0 | 122 | 109 | +13 | 10 | |
| 2 | Ringkøbing Håndbold | 4 | 3 | 0 | 1 | 110 | 102 | +8 | 8 | |
| 3 | Aarhus United | 4 | 1 | 1 | 2 | 95 | 99 | −4 | 4 | |
| 4 | HH Elite | 4 | 0 | 1 | 3 | 105 | 114 | −9 | 2 | |
| 5 | Bjerringbro FH | 4 | 0 | 2 | 2 | 104 | 112 | −8 | 2 | Relegation playoff |

== Statistics ==
=== Topscorers ===
==== Regular season ====
| Rank | Name | Club | Goals |
|---|---|---|---|
| 1 | (Denmark) Line Gyldenløve Kristensen | Bjerringbro FH | 191 |
| 2 | (Denmark) Sarah Paulsen | SønderjyskE | 179 |
| 3 | (Denmark) Line Berggren Larsen | Skanderborg Håndbold | 162 |
| 4 | (Denmark) Jane Mejlvang | Ringkøbing Håndbold | 154 |
| 5 | (Denmark) Christina Pedersen | Viborg HK | 145 |
| 6 | (Denmark) Stine Jørgensen | København Håndbold | 144 |
| 7 | (Denmark) Laura Holm | Skanderborg Håndbold | 140 |
| 8 | (Denmark) Mai Kragballe | HH Elite | 132 |
| 9 | (Norway) Nora Mørk | Team Esbjerg | 130 |
| 10 | (Norway) Henny Reistad | Team Esbjerg | 129 |

==== Total ====
| Rank | Name | Club | Goals |
|---|---|---|---|
| 1 | (Denmark) Line Gyldenløve Kristensen | Bjerringbro FH | 243 |
| 2 | (Denmark) Sarah Paulsen | SønderjyskE | 226 |
| 3 | (Denmark) Line Berggren Larsen | Skanderborg Håndbold | 192 |
| 4 | (Denmark) Stine Jørgensen | København Håndbold | 191 |
| 5 | (Denmark) Jane Mejlvang | Ringkøbing Håndbold | 174 |
| 6 | (Czech Republic) Markéta Jeřábková | Ikast Håndbold | 173 |
| 7 | (Denmark) Christina Pedersen | Viborg HK | 168 |
| 8 | (Norway) Nora Mørk | Team Esbjerg | 166 |
| 9 | (Netherlands) Dione Housheer | Odense Håndbold | 164 |
| 10 | (Norway) Henny Reistad | Team Esbjerg | 163 |
| 10 | (Norway) Ingvild Bakkerud | Ikast Håndbold | 163 |

=== All star team ===
==== Regular season ====
| Position | Name | Club |
|---|---|---|
| Goalkeeper | (Denmark) Anna Kristensen | Team Esbjerg |
| Right wing | (Norway) Marit Røsberg Jacobsen | Team Esbjerg |
| Right back | (Norway) Nora Mørk | Team Esbjerg |
| Centre back | (Norway) Henny Reistad | Team Esbjerg |
| Left back | (Denmark) Line Berggren Larsen | Skanderborg Håndbold |
| Left wing | (Denmark) Laura Holm | Skanderborg Håndbold |
| Pivot | (Denmark) Nanna Hinnerfeldt | Ringkøbing Håndbold |

==== Full season ====
| Position | Name | Club |
|---|---|---|
| Goalkeeper | (Denmark) Anna Kristensen | Team Esbjerg |
| Right wing | (Norway) Andrea Aagot | Odense Håndbold |
| Right back | (Norway) Nora Mørk | Team Esbjerg |
| Centre back | (Norway) Henny Reistad | Team Esbjerg |
| Left back | (Denmark) Line Berggren Larsen | Skanderborg Håndbold |
| Left wing | (Denmark) Laura Holm | Skanderborg Håndbold |
| Pivot | (Denmark) Nanna Hinnerfeldt | Ringkøbing Håndbold |
| MVP | (Norway) Henny Reistad | Team Esbjerg |
| Talent of the year | (Denmark) Anne Christine Bossen | København Håndbold |

=== Coach of the season ===
(Denmark) Jesper Jensen - Team Esbjerg
