= Marit Røsberg-Torgersen =

Norwegian handball player (born 1994)

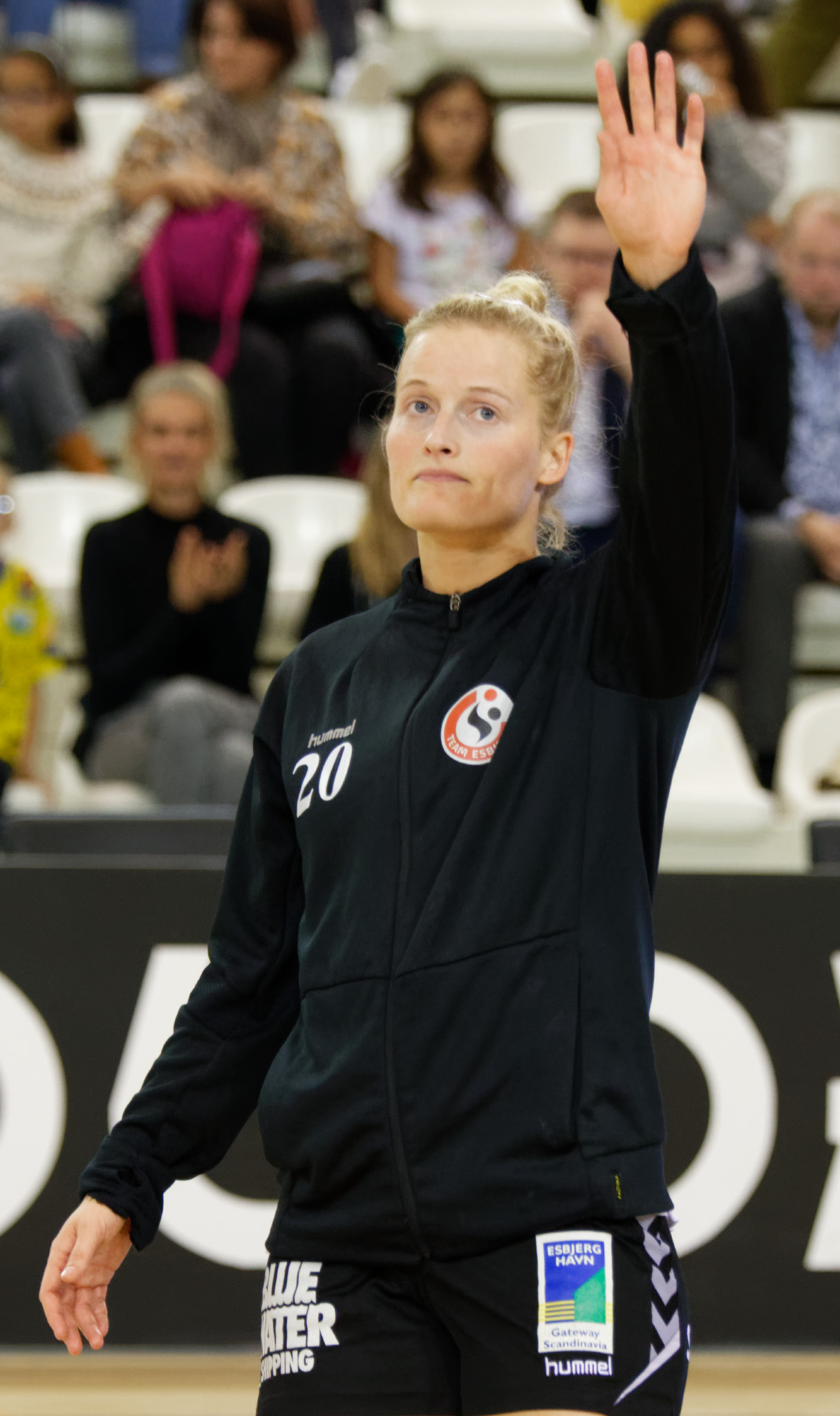
- Jacobsen in 2018

Personal information
- Nationality: Norwegian
- Born: 25 February 1994 (age 32) Narvik, Norway
- Height: 1.65 m (5 ft 5 in)

Sport
- Sport: Handball
- Position: Right wing
- Current club: Team Esbjerg
- Number: 20

Senior clubs
- Years: Team
- –: Ankenes HK
- –2011: Charlottenlund SK
- 2011–2014: Selbu IL
- 2014–2018: Byåsen HE
- 2018–: Team Esbjerg
National team
Years	Team	Apps	(Gls)
2016–	Norway	127	(215)
Medal record
Olympic Games
Gold medal – first place	2024 Paris	Team
Bronze medal – third place	2020 Tokyo	Team
World Championship
Gold medal – first place	2021 Spain
Silver medal – second place	2017 Germany
European Championship
Gold medal – first place	2020 Denmark
Gold medal – first place	2024 Austria/Hungary/Switzerland
Youth World Championship
Bronze medal – third place	2012 Montenegro
Youth European Championship
Bronze medal – third place	2011 Czech Republic
- Updated on 4 January 2025

Marit Røsberg-Torgersen (née Jacobsen; born 25 February 1994) is a Norwegian handball player for Team Esbjerg and the Norwegian national team.

== Career ==
Jacobsen started her career at Ankenes HK, followed by Charlottenlund SK and Selbu IL. In 2014 she joined Byåsen IL.

In 2018, she joined Danish club Team Esbjerg auf. Here she won the 2018-19, 2019-20, 2022-23, and 2023-24 Danish championships and the 2011 and 2022 Danish cup. In the 2021-22, she was on the Danish league all star team as the right wing. In 2019, she reached the final of the EHF Cup, but Esbjerg lost to Hungarian Siófok KC.

In February 2025, she took a break from handball due to pregnancy.

=== National team ===
Jacobsen played 34 games for the various Norwegian youth national teams. She represented Norway in the 2013 Women's Junior European Handball Championship, placing 4th, and in the 2014 Women's Junior World Handball Championship, placing 9th.

She made her debut on the Norwegian national team 1 June 2016. A year later, she played at her first major international tournament, when Norway won silver medals the 2017 World Championship.

She also represented Norway at the 2018 European Championship.

Two years later, she won her first gold medal with Norway, when they won the 2020 European Championship. During the tournament, she scored 9 goals.

At the 2021 Olympics, she won silver medals, losing to France in the final. Jacobsen scored 11 goals during the tournament. Later the same year, she won the 2021 World Championship.

At the 2024 Olympics in Paris, she won gold medals. Later the same year, she won the 2024 European Championship, beating Denmark in the final.

== Achievements ==
- Olympic Games:
  - Winner: 2024
  - Bronze: 2020
- World Championship:
  - Winner: 2021
  - Silver Medalist: 2017
- European Championship:
  - Winner: 2020, 2024
- Youth European Championship:
  - Bronze Medalist: 2011
- World Youth Championship:
  - Bronze Medalist: 2012
- EHF Champions League:
  - Bronze medalist: 2023/2024, 2024/2025
- EHF Cup:
  - Finalist: 2019
- Danish League:
  - Gold Medalist: 2019, 2020, 2023, 2024, 2026
  - Silver Medalist: 2025
- Danish Cup:
  - Gold Medalist: 2021, 2022, 2023, 2024

== Individual awards ==
- All-Star Right Wing of the Youth World Championship: 2012
- All-Star Right Wing of Grundigligaen: 2015/2016
- All-Star Right Wing of Eliteserien: 2017/2018
- All-Star Right Wing of Damehåndboldligaen: 2018/2019, 2019/2020, 2020/2021

== Personal life ==
In February 2025, she announced she was expecting her first child.
