= Kathrine Heindahl =

Danish handball player (born 1992)

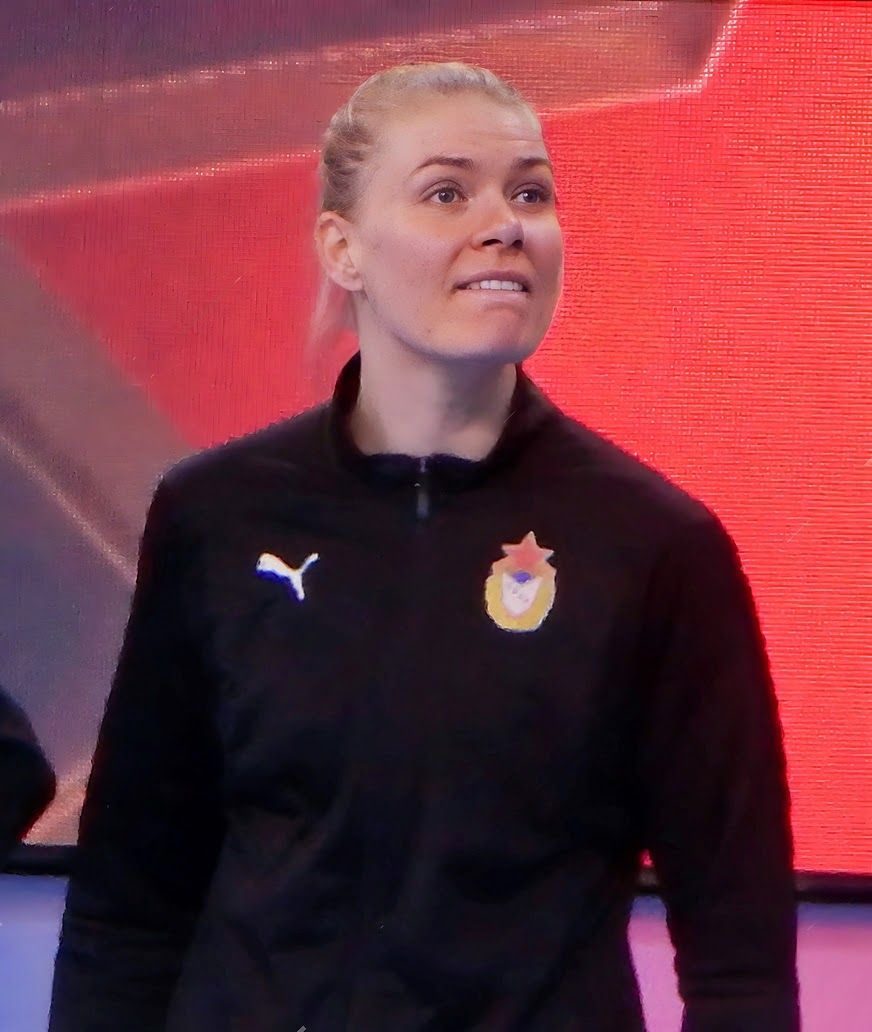
- Heindahl in 2021 (with CSKA Moscow)

Personal information
- Full name: Kathrine Brothmann Heindahl
- Nationality: Danish
- Born: 26 March 1992 (age 34) Rudersdal, Denmark
- Height: 1.85 m (6 ft 1 in)

Sport
- Sport: Handball
- Position: Pivot
- Current club: Ikast Håndbold
- Number: 10

Senior clubs
- Years: Team
- 2007–2010: GOG
- 2010–2011: Odense Håndbold
- 2011–2013: Team Tvis Holstebro
- 2013–2017: Randers HK
- 2017–2020: Odense Håndbold
- 2020–2022: CSKA Moscow
- 2022–2026: Team Esbjerg
- 2026-: Ikast Håndbold
National team
| Years | Team | Apps | (Gls) |
| 2010– | Denmark | 146 | (281) |
Medal record
Olympic Games
| Bronze medal – third place | 2024 Paris | Team |
World Championship
| Bronze medal – third place | 2021 Spain |
| Bronze medal – third place | 2023 Denmark/Norway/Sweden |
European Championship
| Silver medal – second place | 2022 Slovenia/North Macedonia/Montenegro |
European Junior Championship
| Gold medal – first place | 2011 Netherlands |
European Youth Championship
| Gold medal – first place | 2009 Serbia |
- Updated on 12 April 2026

Kathrine Brothmann Heindahl (born 26 March 1992) is a Danish handball player for Ikast Håndbold and the Danish national team.

== Career ==
Heindahl started playing handball at Nyborg GIF on Funen. In 2007 she joined Funen mastodont team GOG, where she played until 2010, when she joined Team Tvis Holstebro on a three-year deal. Here she won the EHF European League in 2012/13. She left TTH due to a release clause in her contract.

She joined Randers HK in 2013, where she played for four years. Then she joined Odense Håndbold for three years.

On 10 February 2020, it was announced that Heindahl had signed a 1-year contract with CSKA Moscow. Here she won the Russian Championship in 2021. In 2022 she terminated her contract on mutual agreement with the club following the 2022 Russian invasion of Ukraine. She was not in Russia at the time of invasion, as she was away on duty with the Danish national team. After the international break, she decided not to return to Russia.

Afterwards she joined Danish Team Esbjerg. Here she won the Danish Championship in 2023 and 2024 and the Danish Cup in 2022.

She has announced that she will leave the club at the end of the 2024/2025 season.

=== National team ===
In 2009 she won the U17 European Championship, and in 2011 she won the U19 European Championship.

She made her debut on the Danish national team on 24 September 2010 against Turkey. She played 5 games between September 2010 and April 2011, but would then not be selected for the national team for three years. In 2014 she was once again in the team.

She participated at the 2016 European Women's Handball Championship in Sweden, where Denmark came 4th.

A year later she played in the 2017 World Women's Handball Championship.

At the 2020 European Women's Handball Championship she would once again come in 4th with the Danish national team.

At the 2021 World Women's Handball Championship she would win her first international medal with Denmark, when they won bronze medals.

At the 2022 European Women's Handball Championship she won silver medals, and was included in the tournament all-star team.

== Outside the court ==
Katrine Heindahl is the vice chairperson of the Danish labour union for Handball players 'spillerforeningen'.

== Achievements ==
- Damehåndboldligaen:
  - Winner: 2023, 2024, 2026
  - Silver Medalist: 2013, 2018, 2020, 2025
  - Bronze Medalist: 2014, 2019
- Danish Cup:
  - Winner: 2016, 2022
  - Finalist: 2018, 2019
- EHF Cup:
  - Winner: 2013
  - Finalist: 2011
- EHF Champions League
  - Bronze Medalist: 2024-25

=== Individual awards ===
- Best Defender at the 2022 European Championship
- EHF Excellence Awards Best defender of the season: 2022/23
