= Nanna Hinnerfeldt =

Danish handball player (born 1999)

Personal information
- Full name: Nanna Hinnerfeldt Andersen
- Nationality: Danish
- Born: 11 June 1999 (age 27) Silkeborg, Denmark
- Height: 1.84 m (6 ft 0 in)

Sport
- Sport: Handball
- Position: Pivot
- Current club: Nykøbing Falster Håndboldklub
- Number: 23

Youth career
- Years: Team
- 2016–2018: FCM Håndbold

Senior clubs
- Years: Team
- 2017–2018: FCM Håndbold
- 2018–2025: Ringkøbing Håndbold
- 2025–: Nykøbing Falster Håndboldklub
National team
Years	Team	Apps	(Gls)
2025–	Denmark	17	(24)
- Updated on 12 April 2026

Nanna Hinnerfeldt Andersen is a Danish handball player, who plays for Nykøbing Falster Håndboldklub.

In the 2023-24 season she was included in the league all-star team as the pivot.

In 2025 she was called up for the Danish national team for the Golden League matches in March. At the 2025 World Championship she played at her first major international tournament. Denmark went out in the quarterfinal to France after winning all matches in the group stages. The Danish team was affected by a lot of players missing the tournament including goalkeepers Sandra Toft and Althea Reinhardt and pivots Sarah Iversen and Rikke Iversen. This was the first time since 2019 that Denmark left a major international tournament without any medals. She acted mainly as a back-up during the tournament.
