= 2021–22 Women's EHF European League =

European handball tournament

Women's EHF European League
- 2021–22

Tournament information
- Sport: Handball
- Dates: 16 October 2021–15 May 2022
- Teams: 34 (qualification stage); 16 (group stage)
- Website: ehfel.com

Final positions
- Champions: (Germany) SG BBM Bietigheim
- Runner-up: (Denmark) Viborg HK

Tournament statistics
- MVP: (Germany) Xenia Smits
- Top scorer(s): (Norway) Camilla Herrem (74 goals)

The 2021–22 Women's EHF European League was the 41st edition of EHF's second-tier women's handball competition, running from 16 October 2021 to 15 May 2022. Neptunes de Nantes were the defending champions.

SG BBM Bietigheim won the tournament, which was the club's first international title.

== Overview ==
=== Team allocation ===
Group stage
(Denmark) Viborg HK	(Hungary) Motherson Mosonmagyaróvár	(Romania) CS Minaur Baia Mare	(Russia) HC Lada
Round 3
(Croatia) RK Lokomotiva Zagreb	(Denmark) Herning-Ikast Håndbold	(France) Chambray Touraine	(France) Neptunes de Nantes
(France) ESBF Besançon	(Germany) SG BBM Bietigheim	(Hungary) DVSC Schaeffler	(Hungary) Váci NKSE
(Norway) Storhamar Håndball Elite	(Romania) SCM Gloria Buzău	(Romania) SCM Râmnicu Vâlcea	(Russia) HC Astrakhanochka
(Russia) Zvezda Zvenigorod			
Round 2
(Austria) Hypo Niederösterreich	(Croatia) ŽRK Bjelovar	(Czech Republic) DHK Baník Most	(France) Paris 92
(Germany) Thüringer HC	(Germany) HSG Blomberg-Lippe	(Germany) TuS Metzingen	(Hungary) MTK Budapest
(Norway) Tertnes HE	(Norway) Sola HK	(Norway) Molde Elite	(Poland) MKS Lublin
(Poland) Zagłębie Lubin	(Romania) Măgura Cisnădie	(Russia) Kuban	(Serbia) RK Radnički Kragujevac
(Serbia) ŽORK Jagodina	(Spain) CB Atlético Guardés	(Spain) BM Bera Bera	(Sweden) H 65 Höör
(Switzerland) LC Brühl Handball	(Turkey) Yalikavksports Club		

== Round and draw dates ==
The schedule of the competition was as follows (all draws were held at the EHF headquarters in Vienna, Austria).

Phase	Round	Draw date	First leg	Second leg
Qualification	Second qualifying round	20 July 2021	16–17 October 2021	23–24 October 2021
Qualification	Third qualifying round	20 July 2021	13–14 November 2021	20–21 November 2021
Group stage	Matchday 1	25 November 2021	8–9 January 2022	
Group stage	Matchday 2	25 November 2021	15–16 January 2022	
Group stage	Matchday 3	25 November 2021	22–23 January 2022	
Group stage	Matchday 4	25 November 2021	5–6 February 2022	
Group stage	Matchday 5	25 November 2021	12–13 February 2022	
Group stage	Matchday 6	25 November 2021	19–20 February 2022	
Knockout phase	Quarter-finals	no draw	26–27 March 2022	2–3 April 2022
Knockout phase	Semi finals	7 April 2022	14 May 2022	
Knockout phase	Final	no draw	15 May 2022	

== Qualification stage ==
=== Round 2 ===
There were 22 teams participating in round 2. The first legs were played on 16–17 October and the second legs were played on 23–24 October 2021.

Team 1	Agg.	Team 2	1st leg	2nd leg
Hypo Niederösterreich (Austria)	48–52	(Spain) CB Atlético Guardés	21–28	27–25
Yalikavaksports Club (Turkey)	54–72	(Hungary) MTK Budapest	24–33	30–39
BM Bera Bera (Spain)	53–48	(France) Paris 92	27–27	26–21
RK Radnički Kragujevac (Serbia)	46–58	(Sweden) H 65 Höör	23–22	23–36
Sola HK (Norway)	68–57	(Russia) Kuban	37–33	31–24
Tertnes HE (Norway)	53–42	(Serbia) ŽORK Jagodina	29–26	24–16
TuS Metzingen (Germany)	51–56	(Germany) HSG Blomberg-Lippe	27–28	24–28
DHK Baník Most (Czech Republic)	52–52 (a)	(Romania) Măgura Cisnădie	26–27	26–25
Thüringer HC (Germany)	60–61	(Norway) Molde Elite	32–35	28–26
LC Brühl Handball (Switzerland)	43–68^{1}	(Poland) Zagłębie Lubin	19–35	24–33
ŽRK Bjelovar (Croatia)	45–78^{2}	(Poland) MKS Lublin	22–32	23–46

Notes

^{1} Both legs were hosted by Zagłębie Lubin.
^{2} Both legs were hosted by MKS Lublin.

=== Round 3 ===
There were 24 teams participating in round 3. The first legs were played on 13–14 November and the second legs were played on 20–21 November 2021.

Team 1	Agg.	Team 2	1st leg	2nd leg
ESBF Besançon (France)	64–47	(Spain) CB Atlético Guardés	34–23	30–24
SG BBM Bietigheim (Germany)	60–38	(Norway) Tertnes HE	39–18	21–20
Zvezda Zvenigorod (Russia)	55–68	(Poland) Zagłębie Lubin	26–35	29–33
DVSC Schaeffler (Hungary)	43–47	(Romania) Măgura Cisnădie	22–22	21–25
Neptunes de Nantes (France)	74–49	(Sweden) H 65 Höör	39–24	35–25
Sola HK (Norway)	56–52	(Russia) HC Astrakhanochka	36–25	20–27
Storhamar HE (Norway)	57–53	(Romania) SCM Gloria Buzău	31–27	26–26
Váci NKSE (Hungary)	56–51	(Germany) HSG Blomberg-Lippe	32–27	24–24
RK Lokomotiva Zagreb (Croatia)	54–48	(Poland) MKS Lublin	25–21	29–27
SCM Râmnicu Vâlcea (Romania)	63–55	(Spain) BM Bera Bera	34–28	29–27
Chambray Touraine (France)	65–52	(Norway) Molde Elite	30–27	35–25
MTK Budapest (Hungary)	56–68	(Denmark) Herning-Ikast Håndbold	27–34	29–34

== Group stage ==
The draw for the group phase was held on Thursday, 25 November 2021. In each group, teams played against each other in a double round-robin format, with home and away matches.

Tiebreakers
In the group stage, teams were ranked according to points (2 points for a win, 1 point for a draw, 0 points for a loss). After completion of the group stage, if two or more teams have scored the same number of points, the ranking will be determined as follows:
1. Highest number of points in matches between the teams directly involved;
2. Superior goal difference in matches between the teams directly involved;
3. Highest number of goals scored in matches between the teams directly involved (or in the away match in case of a two-team tie);
4. Superior goal difference in all matches of the group;
5. Highest number of plus goals in all matches of the group;

If the ranking of one of these teams is determined, the above criteria are consecutively followed until the ranking of all teams is determined. If no ranking can be determined, a decision shall be obtained by EHF through drawing of lots.

During the group stage, only criteria 4–5 apply to determine the provisional ranking of teams.

=== Group A ===
Pos	Team	Pld	W	D	L	GF	GA	GD	Pts	Qualification	SOL	BES	MKC	LOK
1	(Norway) Sola HK	6	6	0	0	196	150	+46	12	Quarterfinals	—	34–27	27–22	25–18
2	(France) ESBF Besançon	6	3	0	3	182	188	−6	6 (Note: ESBF Besançon 64–62 Motherson Mosonmagyaróvár)	Quarterfinals	32–39	—	34–24	28–27
3	(Hungary) Motherson Mosonmagyaróvár	6	3	0	3	160	165	−5	6		26–31	38–30	—	28–24
4	(Croatia) RK Lokomotiva Zagreb	6	0	0	6	139	174	−35	0		25–40	26–31	19–22	—

Source: EHF

=== Group B ===
Pos	Team	Pld	W	D	L	GF	GA	GD	Pts	Qualification	BIE	BAI	NAN	ZAG
1	(Germany) SG BBM Bietigheim	6	6	0	0	188	134	+54	12	Quarterfinals	—	39–20	32–29	29–19
2	(Romania) CS Minaur Baia Mare	6	2	1	3	154	182	−28	5	Quarterfinals	20–28	—	28–26	34–32
3	(France) Neptunes de Nantes	6	2	0	4	168	170	−2	4		25–27	34–29	—	27–28
4	(Poland) Zagłębie Lubin	6	1	1	4	149	173	−24	3		21–33	23–23	26–27	—

Source: EHF

=== Group C ===
Pos	Team	Pld	W	D	L	GF	GA	GD	Pts	Qualification	HIH	STO	MAG	LAD
1	(Denmark) Herning-Ikast Håndbold	6	6	0	0	193	161	+32	12	Quarterfinals	—	32–24	31–28	34–27
2	(Norway) Storhamar HE	6	3	0	3	178	172	+6	6	Quarterfinals	27–35	—	35–18	34–29
3	(Romania) Măgura Cisnădie	6	2	0	4	137	162	−25	4		31–34	33–28	—	27–24
4	(Russia) HC Lada	6	1	0	5	139	152	−13	2		24–27	25–30	10–0	—

Source: EHF

=== Group D ===
Pos	Team	Pld	W	D	L	GF	GA	GD	Pts	Qualification	VHK	VAL	CHA	VAC
1	(Denmark) Viborg HK	6	4	2	0	185	149	+36	10	Quarterfinals	—	31–20	29–29	42–21
2	(Romania) SCM Râmnicu Vâlcea	6	4	1	1	178	172	+6	9	Quarterfinals	30–30	—	32–27	39–29
3	(France) Chambray Touraine	6	1	1	4	163	176	−13	3		24–27	25–26	—	29–27
4	(Hungary) Váci NKSE	6	1	0	5	167	196	−29	2		25–26	30–31	35–29	—

Source: EHF

== Quarterfinals ==
Team 1	Agg.	Team 2	1st leg	2nd leg
CS Minaur Baia Mare (Romania)	69–61	(Norway) Sola HK	40–32	29–29
ESBF Besançon (France)	43–59	(Germany) SG BBM Bietigheim	23–29	20–30
SCM Râmnicu Vâlcea (Romania)	61–72	(Denmark) Herning-Ikast Håndbold	33–39	28–33
Storhamar HE (Norway)	68–71	(Denmark) Viborg HK	31–33	37–38

=== Matches ===
26 March 2022; 16:00	CS Minaur Baia Mare (Romania)	40–32	(Norway) Sola HK	Lascăr Pană Sports Hall, Baia Mare; Attendance: 1,900; Referees: Praštalo, Balvan (BIH)
26 March 2022; 16:00	Lavko 9	(18–14)	Deila 8	Lascăr Pană Sports Hall, Baia Mare; Attendance: 1,900; Referees: Praštalo, Balvan (BIH)
26 March 2022; 16:00	1× (yellow card) 3× (suspension)	Report	1× (yellow card) 3× (suspension)	Lascăr Pană Sports Hall, Baia Mare; Attendance: 1,900; Referees: Praštalo, Balvan (BIH)

3 April 2022; 16:00	Sola HK (Norway)	29–29	(Romania) CS Minaur Baia Mare	Stavanger Idrettshall, Stavanger; Attendance: 2,500; Referees: Korja, Metsämäki (FIN)
3 April 2022; 16:00	Herrem 8	(16–10)	Laslo 7	Stavanger Idrettshall, Stavanger; Attendance: 2,500; Referees: Korja, Metsämäki (FIN)
3 April 2022; 16:00	2× (yellow card) 4× (suspension)	Report	3× (suspension)	Stavanger Idrettshall, Stavanger; Attendance: 2,500; Referees: Korja, Metsämäki (FIN)

27 March 2022; 14:00	ESBF Besançon (France)	23–29	(Germany) SG BBM Bietigheim	Palais des Sports, Besançon; Attendance: 3,000; Referees: Ciulei, Stanescu (ROU)
27 March 2022; 14:00	Mairot 5	(13–17)	Maidhof 10	Palais des Sports, Besançon; Attendance: 3,000; Referees: Ciulei, Stanescu (ROU)
27 March 2022; 14:00	1× (yellow card) 4× (suspension)	Report	2× (yellow card) 7× (suspension)	Palais des Sports, Besançon; Attendance: 3,000; Referees: Ciulei, Stanescu (ROU)

2 April 2022; 16:00	SG BBM Bietigheim (Germany)	30–20	(France) ESBF Besançon	MHPArena, Ludwigsburg; Attendance: 1,481; Referees: Di Domenico, Fornasier (ITA)
2 April 2022; 16:00	three players 5	(12–10)	Rosiak 5	MHPArena, Ludwigsburg; Attendance: 1,481; Referees: Di Domenico, Fornasier (ITA)
2 April 2022; 16:00	1× (yellow card) 5× (suspension)	Report	3× (suspension)	MHPArena, Ludwigsburg; Attendance: 1,481; Referees: Di Domenico, Fornasier (ITA)

27 March 2022; 14:00	SCM Râmnicu Vâlcea (Romania)	33–39	(Denmark) Herning-Ikast Håndbold	Traian Sports Hall, Râmnicu Vâlcea; Attendance: 1,500; Referees: Charitsos, Naskos (GRE)
27 March 2022; 14:00	Glibko 9	(17–20)	Friis 11	Traian Sports Hall, Râmnicu Vâlcea; Attendance: 1,500; Referees: Charitsos, Naskos (GRE)
27 March 2022; 14:00	1× (yellow card) 4× (suspension)	Report	1× (yellow card) 2× (suspension)	Traian Sports Hall, Râmnicu Vâlcea; Attendance: 1,500; Referees: Charitsos, Naskos (GRE)

2 April 2022; 18:00	Herning-Ikast Håndbold (Denmark)	33–28	(Romania) SCM Râmnicu Vâlcea	IBF Arena, Ikast; Attendance: 1,056; Referees: Ivanauskas, Jencevicius (LTU)
2 April 2022; 18:00	Scaglione 7	(16–12)	Elghaoui 10	IBF Arena, Ikast; Attendance: 1,056; Referees: Ivanauskas, Jencevicius (LTU)
2 April 2022; 18:00	3× (suspension)	Report	1× (yellow card) 6× (suspension)	IBF Arena, Ikast; Attendance: 1,056; Referees: Ivanauskas, Jencevicius (LTU)

26 March 2022; 18:00	Storhamar HE (Norway)	31–33	(Denmark) Viborg HK	Boligpartner Arena, Hamar; Attendance: 1,624; Referees: Hofer, Schmidhuber (AUT)
26 March 2022; 18:00	Obaidli 9	(19–18)	Nolsøe 9	Boligpartner Arena, Hamar; Attendance: 1,624; Referees: Hofer, Schmidhuber (AUT)
26 March 2022; 18:00	2× (suspension)	Report	1× (yellow card) 4× (suspension)	Boligpartner Arena, Hamar; Attendance: 1,624; Referees: Hofer, Schmidhuber (AUT)

3 April 2022; 14:00	Viborg HK (Denmark)	38–37	(Norway) Storhamar HE	Vibocold Arena, Viborg; Attendance: 1,866; Referees: Weijmans, Wolbertus (NED)
3 April 2022; 14:00	Jørgensen 11	(19–21)	Hovden 12	Vibocold Arena, Viborg; Attendance: 1,866; Referees: Weijmans, Wolbertus (NED)
3 April 2022; 14:00	2× (suspension)	Report	1× (yellow card) 3× (suspension)	Vibocold Arena, Viborg; Attendance: 1,866; Referees: Weijmans, Wolbertus (NED)

== Final four ==
The final four was held at the Vibocold Arena in Viborg, Denmark on 14 and 15 May 2022. The draw was made on 7 April 2022.

=== Bracket ===
Semifinals
14 May
(Denmark) Viborg HK	28
(Romania) CS Minaur Baia Mare	24
14 May
(Denmark) Herning-Ikast Håndbold	33
(Germany) SG BBM Bietigheim	34

Final
15 May
(Denmark) Viborg HK	20
(Germany) SG BBM Bietigheim	31
Third place
15 May
(Romania) CS Minaur Baia Mare	28
(Denmark) Herning-Ikast Håndbold	29

=== Semifinals ===
14 May 2022; 15:30	Herning-Ikast Håndbold (Denmark)	33–34	(Germany) SG BBM Bietigheim	Vibocold Arena, Viborg; Attendance: 1,469; Referees: Ünlü Hatipoğlu, Şimşek (TUR)
14 May 2022; 15:30	Brandt 8	(12–14)	Kudłacz-Gloc 8	Vibocold Arena, Viborg; Attendance: 1,469; Referees: Ünlü Hatipoğlu, Şimşek (TUR)
14 May 2022; 15:30	1× (yellow card) 7× (suspension) 1× (red card)	Report	1× (yellow card) 7× (suspension)	Vibocold Arena, Viborg; Attendance: 1,469; Referees: Ünlü Hatipoğlu, Şimşek (TUR)

14 May 2022; 18:00	Viborg HK (Denmark)	28–24	(Romania) CS Minaur Baia Mare	Vibocold Arena, Viborg; Attendance: 1,517; Referees: Christidi, Papamattheou (GRE)
14 May 2022; 18:00	Haugsted 7	(16–13)	Laslo 7	Vibocold Arena, Viborg; Attendance: 1,517; Referees: Christidi, Papamattheou (GRE)
14 May 2022; 18:00	1× (yellow card) 3× (suspension)	Report	2× (yellow card) 2× (suspension)	Vibocold Arena, Viborg; Attendance: 1,517; Referees: Christidi, Papamattheou (GRE)

=== Third place game ===
15 May 2022; 15:30	CS Minaur Baia Mare (Romania)	28–29	(Denmark) Herning-Ikast Håndbold	Vibocold Arena, Viborg; Attendance: 1,688; Referees: Duplii, Pobedrina (UKR)
15 May 2022; 15:30	Lavko 7	(12–14)	Bakkerud 6	Vibocold Arena, Viborg; Attendance: 1,688; Referees: Duplii, Pobedrina (UKR)
15 May 2022; 15:30	4× (suspension)	Report	1× (yellow card) 1× (suspension)	Vibocold Arena, Viborg; Attendance: 1,688; Referees: Duplii, Pobedrina (UKR)

=== Final ===
15 May 2022; 18:00	Viborg HK (Denmark)	20–31	(Germany) SG BBM Bietigheim	Vibocold Arena, Viborg; Attendance: 1,697; Referees: Antić, Jakovljević (SRB)
15 May 2022; 18:00	K. Jørgensen 5	(10–17)	Maidhof 6	Vibocold Arena, Viborg; Attendance: 1,697; Referees: Antić, Jakovljević (SRB)
15 May 2022; 18:00	2× (yellow card) 4× (suspension)	Report	2× (yellow card) 4× (suspension)	Vibocold Arena, Viborg; Attendance: 1,697; Referees: Antić, Jakovljević (SRB)

== Top goalscorers ==
Rank	Player	Club	Goals
1	(Norway) Camilla Herrem	(Norway) Sola HK	74
2	(Denmark) Kristina Jørgensen	(Denmark) Viborg HK	72
3	(Norway) Emilie Hovden	(Norway) Storhamar HE	64
4	(Serbia) Jelena Lavko	(Romania) CS Minaur Baia Mare	60
5	(Denmark) Emma Friis	(Denmark) Herning-Ikast Håndbold	52
5	(Ukraine) Iryna Glibko	(Romania) SCM Râmnicu Vâlcea	52
5	(Hungary) Csenge Kuczora	(Hungary) Váci NKSE	52
5	(Norway) Kristina Novak	(Norway) Sola HK	52
9	(Hungary) Asma Elghaoui	(Romania) SCM Râmnicu Vâlcea	51
9	(Norway) Maja Magnussen	(Norway) Sola HK	51

== See also ==
- 2021–22 Women's EHF Champions League
