= Line Mai Hougaard =

Danish handball player (born 1999)

Line Hougaard
Personal information
- Full name: Line Mai Nørgaard Hougaard
- Nationality: Danish
- Born: 6 October 1999 (age 27) Herning, Denmark
- Height: 1.62 m (5 ft 4 in)

Sport
- Sport: Handball
- Position: Right wing
- Current club: Ikast Håndbold
- Number: 77

Senior clubs
- Years: Team
- 2016–2018: TTH Holstebro
- 2018–2020: Randers HK
- 2020–: Ikast Håndbold
National team
Years	Team	Apps	(Gls)
2018-	Denmark	11	(21)
Medal record
Women's handball
Representing Denmark
U-19 European Championship
Bronze medal – third place	2017 Slovenia
- Updated on 12 April 2026

Line Mai Nørgaard Hougaard (born 6 October 1999) is a Danish handball player for Ikast Håndbold and the Danish national team.

In 2016 she won the EHF Cup Winners' Cup with TTH Holstebro.
