= Irma Schjött =

Swedish handball player (born 1998)

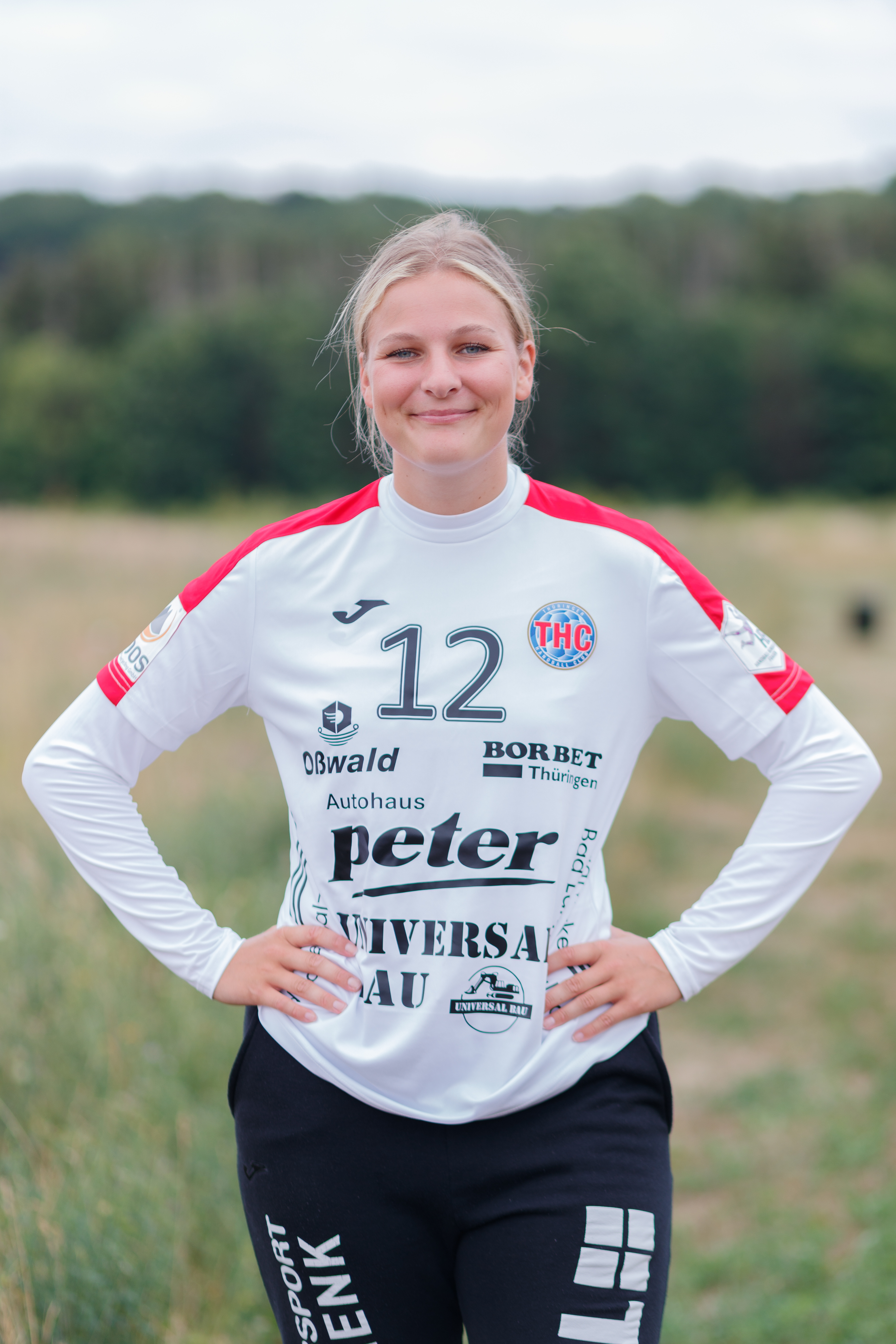

Personal information
- Nationality: Swedish
- Born: 18 November 1998 (age 27) Eskilstuna, Sweden
- Height: 1.79 m (5 ft 10 in)

Sport
- Sport: Handball
- Position: Goalkeeper
- Current club: Ikast Håndbold
- Number: 1

Senior clubs
- Years: Team
- –2016: Gökstens BK
- 2016–2019: VästeråsIrsta HF
- 2019–2022: H 65 Höör
- 2022–2023: Thüringer HC
- 2023–2025: Ikast Håndbold
National team
Years	Team	Apps	(Gls)
2018–2025	Sweden	9	(2)

Irma Schjött (born 18 November 1998) is a Swedish former handball player for Ikast Håndbold and the Swedish national team.

Schjött participated at the 2023 World Women's Handball Championship.
