= Stine Jørgensen =

Danish handball player (born 1990)

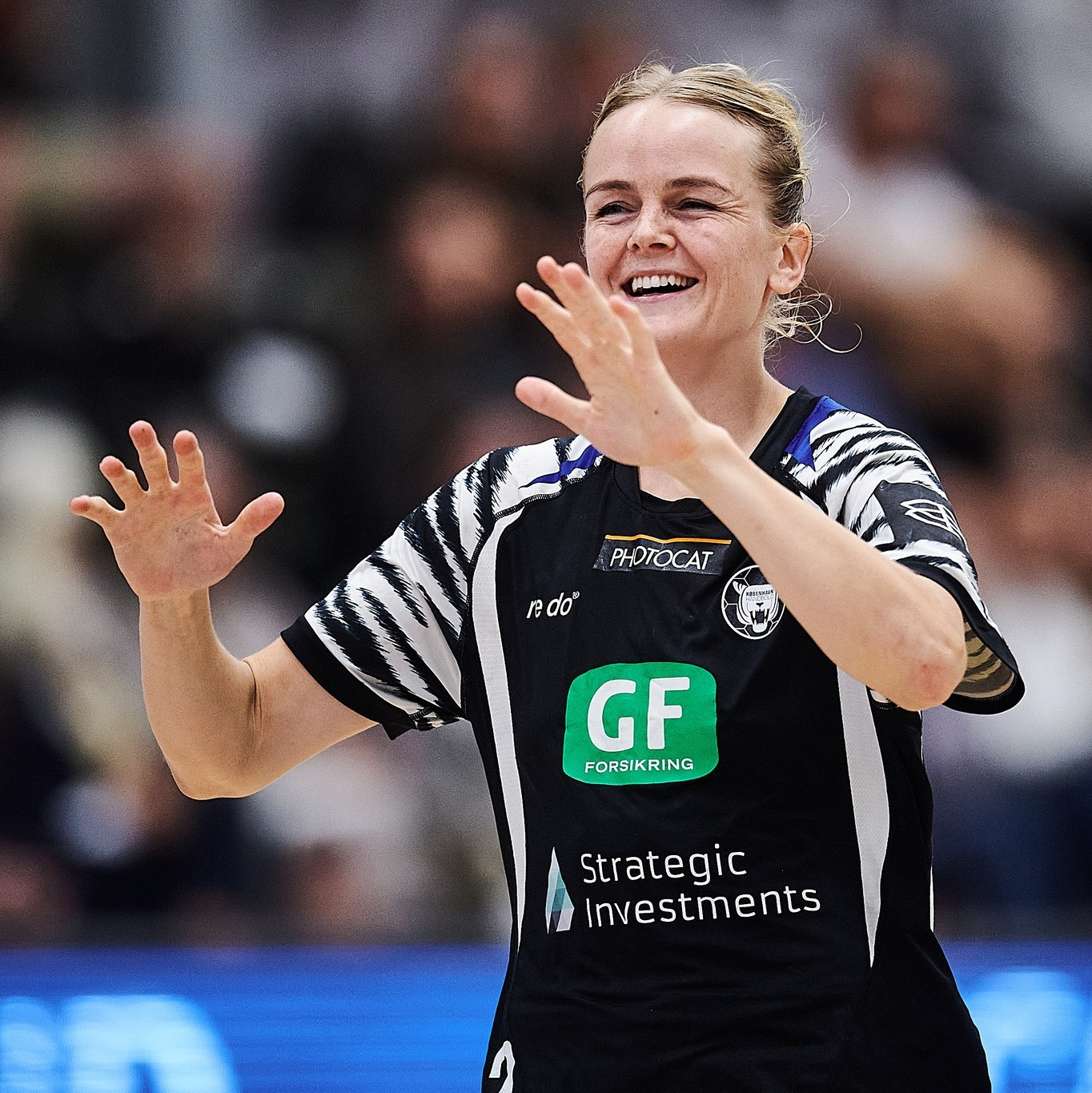
- Stine Jørgensen in 2023

Personal information
- Full name: Stine Østergaard Jørgensen
- Nationality: Danish
- Born: 3 September 1990 (age 36) Dronninglund, Denmark
- Height: 1.80 m (5 ft 11 in)

Sport
- Sport: Handball
- Position: Centre back
- Current club: København Håndbold
- Number: 22

Youth career
- Years: Team
- –: Dronninglund IF
- 2005–2008: Aalborg DH

Senior clubs
- Years: Team
- 2008–2013: Aalborg DH
- 2013–2017: FC Midtjylland
- 2017–2020: Odense Håndbold
- 2020–2022: SG BBM Bietigheim
- 2022–2025: København Håndbold
National team
Years	Team	Apps	(Gls)
2010–2019	Denmark	149	(493)
Medal record
World Championship
Bronze medal – third place	2013 Serbia

Stine Østergaard Jørgensen (born 3 September 1990) is a Danish former handball player. She was the team captain of the national team and participated at the 2011 World Women's Handball Championship in Brazil. In May 2020, she announced her retirement from the Danish national team.

== Club career ==
She started playing handball at the age of 5 years, for her hometown Dronninglund. When she was 16 years old, she moved to the Danish top club Aalborg DH, where she also represented the youth team. In Aalborg DH, she received silver in the Danish Women's Handball League in 2009.

She moved to FC Midtjylland Håndbold in the summer 2013, after Aalborg DH dealt with economic problems and went bankrupt. She participated at the 2013–14 EHF Women's Champions League Final Four and won several titles and merits in the Danish League and the Danish Cup.

At the 2013 World Championship, she was a part of the Danish team that won bronze medals, breaking a 9-year streak without medals for the Danish team. They beat Poland 30–26.

Jørgensen moved to Odense Håndbold in 2017, after spending four years for FC Midtjylland Håndbold. Three years later in 2020, she signed a 2-year contract with German SG BBM Bietigheim. In 2022 she returned to Denmark and joined København Håndbold on a 4-year deal.

She retired after the 2024-25 season. Her contract with København Håndbold initially ran until 2027, but it had been cancelled in May 2025 due to the club's difficult financial situation.

== Achievements ==
=== International ===
- World Championship:
  - Bronze Medalist: 2013

=== Domestic ===
- Damehåndboldligaen:
  - Winner: 2015
  - Silver Medalist: 2009, 2014, 2016, 2018, 2020
  - Bronze Medalist: 2017, 2019
- Danish Cup:
  - Winner: 2014, 2015
  - Finalist: 2016, 2018, 2019
- Bundesliga:
  - Winner: 2022

=== Continental ===
- EHF Cup Winners' Cup:
  - Winner: 2015
- EHF European League:
  - Winner: 2022

== Personal life ==
Jørgensen is married to Danish badminton player Jan Ø. Jørgensen and they have twins together.
