= 2022–23 Damehåndboldligaen =

Damehåndboldligaen
- Season: 2022–23
- Dates: 30 August 2022 - 8 June 2023
- Champion: Team Esbjerg (4th title)
- Relegated: Randers HK (Administrative relegation)
- Champions League: Odense Håndbold; Team Esbjerg; Ikast Håndbold
- EHF European League: København Håndbold; Nykøbing Falster HB
- Matches played: 124
- Top goalscorer: (Norway) Henny Reistad (204 goals)
- Biggest home win: 19 goals ESB 35-16 RIN (5 Oct)
- Biggest away win: 15 goals ODE 36-21 VHK (31 Aug); IKA 32-17 AAR (13 Sep)
- Highest scoring: 68 goals KBH 40-28 SKA (12 Oct)
- Longest unbeaten run: 8 matches Ikast Håndbold (5 Sep - 1. Dec 2022)
- Longest winless run: 8 matches SønderjyskE Håndbold (27 Aug - 27 Nov 2022)
- Longest losing run: 8 matches SønderjyskE Håndbold (27 Aug - 27 Nov 2022)

The 2022–23 Damehåndboldligaen (known as Bambusa Kvindeligaen for sponsorship reasons) was the 87th season of Damehåndboldligaen, Denmark's premier women's handball league. Odense Håndbold were the defending champions, while SønderjyskE Håndbold were promoted from the 1. division.

On November 10th, 2022, Randers HK declared bankruptcy, withdrew from league and had all their results annulled.

Team Esbjerg won their fourth title, beating Odense Håndbold in the final in two games.

== Team information ==
| Team. | Town/City | Arena | Capacity |
|---|---|---|---|
| SønderjyskE Håndbold | Aabenraa | Arena Aabenraa | 1.480 |
| Nykøbing Falster Håndboldklub | Nykøbing Falster | Lånlet Arena | 1.300 |
| Aarhus United | Aarhus | Ceres Stadionhal | 1.200 |
| Ikast Håndbold | Ikast | IBF Arena | 2.850 |
| HH Elite | Horsens | Forum Horsens | 4.000 |
| København Håndbold | Copenhagen | Frederiksberg-Hallerne | 1.468 |
| Ajax København | Copenhagen | Bavnehøj-Hallen | 1.000 |
| Ringkøbing Håndbold | Ringkøbing | Green Sports Arena | 1.000 |
| Randers HK | Randers | Arena Randers | 3.000 |
| Silkeborg-Voel KFUM | Silkeborg | Jysk Arena | 3.000 |
| Team Esbjerg | Esbjerg | Blue Water Dokken | 2.549 |
| Viborg HK | Viborg | Vibocold Arena Viborg | 3.000 |
| Odense Håndbold | Odense | Sydbank Arena Odense | 2.256 |
| Skanderborg Håndbold | Skanderborg | Fælledhallen | 1.700 |

=== Team information ===
| Team | Managing Director | Head coach | Shirt producer | Main Sponsor |
|---|---|---|---|---|
| Silkeborg-Voel KFUM | Mikael Bak | (Denmark) Jakob Andreasen | adidas | Wila A/S, JYSK |
| Ikast Håndbold | Jakob Mølgaard Christensen | (Denmark) Kasper Christensen | Mizuno | Sport 24, Danspin A/S, IBF A/S, Klimahuse A/S |
| HH Elite | Jørgen Møller | (Denmark) Jan Leslie | hummel | Badelement |
| Aarhus United | Mads Hyllested Winther | (Denmark) Heine Eriksen | H2O Sportswear | Vestjysk Bank, Koncenton A/S |
| København Håndbold | Henriette Mærsk | (Denmark) Rasmus Overby | Kelme | Strategic Investments, GF Forsikring |
| Nykøbing Falster Håndboldklub | Kennet Berlin | (Greenland) Jakob Larsen | Puma | Basisbank, Scandlines |
| Ringkøbing Håndbold | Charlotte Christensen | (Denmark) Jesper Holmris | hummel | Vestjysk Bank |
| Randers HK | Per Rasmussen | (Denmark) Ole Bitsch | Craft Sportswear | Sparekassen Kronjylland |
| Ajax København | Mathias Berg | (Denmark) Rasmus Poulsen | adidas | Det Faglige Hus |
| Skanderborg Håndbold | Jens Christensen | (Denmark) Jeppe Vestergaard | Puma | AVK Danmark, Skanderborg Kommune |
| Odense Håndbold | Niels Eriksen | (Denmark) Ulrik Kirkely | Craft Sportswear | Sydbank |
| SønderjyskE Håndbold | Klaus B. Rasmussen | (Denmark) Peter Nielsen | hummel | Sydbank |
| Viborg HK | Jørgen Hansen | (Denmark) Jakob Vestergaard | Puma SE | Spar Nord, Peter Larsen Kaffe, Sport 24, Tefcold A/S, Back Gruppen A/S |
| Team Esbjerg | Hans Christian Warrer | (Denmark) Jesper Jensen | hummel | Blue Water Shipping, Pedersen Gruppen, Skechers |

== Regular season ==
=== Standings ===
| Pos | Team | Pld | W | D | L | GF | GA | GD | Pts | Qualification or relegation |
|---|---|---|---|---|---|---|---|---|---|---|
| 1 | Odense Håndbold | 24 | 21 | 1 | 2 | 760 | 580 | +180 | 43 | Championship play-offs + advance to Champions League |
| 2 | Team Esbjerg | 24 | 20 | 1 | 3 | 757 | 572 | +185 | 41 | Championship play-offs |
| 3 | Ikast Håndbold | 24 | 18 | 0 | 6 | 697 | 580 | +117 | 36 | Championship play-offs |
| 4 | Nykøbing Falster Håndboldklub | 24 | 15 | 0 | 9 | 714 | 661 | +53 | 30 | Championship play-offs |
| 5 | Viborg HK | 24 | 14 | 2 | 8 | 676 | 642 | +34 | 30 | Championship play-offs |
| 6 | København Håndbold | 24 | 14 | 1 | 9 | 671 | 672 | −1 | 29 | Championship play-offs |
| 7 | Silkeborg-Voel KFUM | 24 | 9 | 3 | 12 | 650 | 678 | −28 | 21 | Championship play-offs |
| 8 | Aarhus United | 24 | 8 | 3 | 13 | 599 | 633 | −34 | 19 | Championship play-offs |
| 9 | HH Elite | 24 | 8 | 2 | 14 | 595 | 679 | −84 | 18 | |
| 10 | Ringkøbing Håndbold | 24 | 7 | 1 | 16 | 630 | 719 | −89 | 15 | |
| 11 | SønderjyskE Håndbold | 24 | 6 | 0 | 18 | 598 | 690 | −92 | 12 | |
| 12 | Skanderborg Håndbold | 24 | 5 | 1 | 18 | 626 | 743 | −117 | 11 | |
| 13 | Ajax København | 24 | 3 | 1 | 20 | 542 | 666 | −124 | 7 | |
| 14 | Randers HK | 0 | 0 | 0 | 0 | 0 | 0 | 0 | 0 | Relegation to 1. division |

Rules for classification: 1.) Points in head-to-head matches amongst tied teams; 2.) Goal difference in head-to-head matches amongst tied teams; 3.) Goals scored in head-to-head matches among tied teams; 4.) Points in all matches; 5.) Goal difference in all matches.

=== Relegation table ===
| Pos | Team | Pld | W | D | L | GF | GA | GD | Pts | Qualification |
|---|---|---|---|---|---|---|---|---|---|---|
| 1 | HH Elite (Note: HH Elite was awarded 2 point for their regular season standings) | 4 | 2 | 1 | 1 | 125 | 110 | +15 | 7 | |
| 2 | Ringkøbing Håndbold (Note: Ringkøbing Håndbold was awarded 2 point for their regular season standings) | 4 | 2 | 1 | 1 | 113 | 111 | +2 | 7 | |
| 3 | SønderjyskE Håndbold (Note: SønderjyskE was awarded 1 point for their regular season standings) | 4 | 3 | 0 | 1 | 114 | 122 | −8 | 7 | |
| 4 | Skanderborg Håndbold (Note: Skanderborg Håndbold was awarded 1 point for their regular season standings) | 4 | 1 | 1 | 2 | 127 | 124 | +3 | 4 | |
| 5 | Ajax København | 4 | 0 | 1 | 3 | 100 | 112 | −12 | 1 | Relegation playoff |

Updated to match(es) played on 1 April 2023. Source:

== Championship Playoff ==
=== Group 1 ===
| Pos | Team | Pld | W | D | L | GF | GA | GD | Pts | Qualification |
|---|---|---|---|---|---|---|---|---|---|---|
| 1 | Odense Håndbold (Note: Odense Håndbold was awarded 2 point for their regular season standings) | 6 | 6 | 0 | 0 | 203 | 155 | +48 | 14 | Semifinals |
| 2 | Nykøbing Falster HK (Note: Nykøbind Falster HK was awarded 1 point for their regular season standings) | 6 | 2 | 1 | 3 | 164 | 177 | −13 | 6 | Semifinals |
| 3 | Viborg HK | 6 | 2 | 0 | 4 | 175 | 186 | −11 | 4 | |
| 4 | Aarhus United | 6 | 1 | 1 | 4 | 164 | 188 | −24 | 3 | |

=== Group 2 ===
| Pos | Team | Pld | W | D | L | GF | GA | GD | Pts | Qualification |
|---|---|---|---|---|---|---|---|---|---|---|
| 1 | Team Esbjerg (Note: Team Esbjerg was awarded 2 point for their regular season standings) | 6 | 6 | 0 | 0 | 221 | 139 | +82 | 14 | Semifinals |
| 2 | Ikast Håndbold (Note: Ikast Håndbold was awarded 1 point for their regular season standings) | 6 | 3 | 0 | 3 | 174 | 172 | +2 | 7 | Semifinals |
| 3 | København Håndbold | 6 | 3 | 0 | 3 | 166 | 190 | −24 | 6 | |
| 4 | Silkeborg-Voel KFUM | 6 | 0 | 0 | 6 | 155 | 215 | −60 | 0 | |

=== Semifinals ===
| Date | | | Home team - Match 1 | Home team - Match 2 | Result | | |
| Match 1 | Match 2 | Match 3 | Home team - Match 1 | Home team - Match 2 | Match 1 | Match 2 | Match 3 |
|---|---|---|---|---|---|---|---|
| 20.05 | 23.05 | | Team Esbjerg | Nykøbing Falster Håndboldklub | 30-25 | 31-19 | |
| 20-05 | 23.05 | 27.05 | Odense Håndbold | Ikast Håndbold | 25-27 | 26-24 | 27-24 |

! Best of three matches. In the case of a tie after the second match, a third match is played. Highest ranking team in the regular season has the home advantage in the first and possible third match.

=== Third place play off ===
| Date | | Home team - Match 1 IBF Arena | Home team - Match 2 Spar Nord Arena | Result | |
| Match 1 | Match 2 | Home team - Match 1 IBF Arena | Home team - Match 2 Spar Nord Arena | Match 1 | Match 2 |
|---|---|---|---|---|---|
| 30.05 | 08.06 | Ikast Håndbold | Nykøbing Falster Håndboldklub | 33-31 | 27-24 |

! Best of three matches. In the case of a tie after the second match, a third match is played. Highest ranking team in the regular season has the home advantage in the first and possible third match.

=== Final ===
| Date | | Home team - Match 1 Blue Water Dokken | Home team - Match 2 Sydbank Arena | Result | |
| Match 1 | Match 2 | Home team - Match 1 Blue Water Dokken | Home team - Match 2 Sydbank Arena | Match 1 | Match 2 |
|---|---|---|---|---|---|
| 30.05 | 08.06 | Team Esbjerg | Odense Håndbold | 26-27 | 34-21 |

! Best of three matches. In the case of a tie after the second match, a third match is played. Highest ranking team in the regular season has the home advantage in the first and possible third match.

== Season statistics ==
=== Top goalscorers ===
As of 2 July 2023

==== Regular season ====
| Rank | Player | Club | Goals |
|---|---|---|---|
| 1 | (Denmark) Jane Mejlvang | Ringkøbing Håndbold | 152 |
| 2 | (Denmark) Stine Jørgensen | København Håndbold | 146 |
| 3 | (Denmark) Mathilde Neesgaard | Aarhus United | 144 |
| 4 | (Norway) Henny Reistad | Team Esbjerg | 140 |
| 5 | (Norway) Emilie Hovden | Viborg HK | 139 |
| 6 | (Denmark) Rikke Hoffbeck | Skanderborg Håndbold | 135 |
| 7 | (Denmark) Anna Grundtvig | Ajax København | 132 |
| 8 | (Denmark) Natasja Andreasen | Silkeborg-Voel KFUM | 120 |
| 9 | (Denmark) Elma Halilcevic | Nykøbing Falster HK | 117 |
| 10 | (Norway) Eira Aune | Silkeborg-Voel KFUM | 113 |
| 10 | (Norway) Ingvild Bakkerud | Ikast Håndbold | 113 |

==== Overall ====
| Rank | Player | Club | Goals |
|---|---|---|---|
| 1 | (Norway) Henny Reistad | Team Esbjerg | 204 |
| 2 | (Denmark) Jane Mejlvang | Ringkøbing Håndbold | 184 |
| 3 | (Denmark) Stine Jørgensen | København Håndbold | 182 |
| 4 | (Denmark) Mathilde Neesgaard | Aarhus United | 181 |
| 5 | (Denmark) Elma Halilcevic | Nykøbing Falster HK | 171 |
| 6 | (Norway) Emilie Hovden | Viborg HK | 170 |
| 7 | (Denmark) Rikke Hoffbeck | Skanderborg Håndbold | 163 |
| 7 | (Denmark) Anna Grundtvig | Ajax København | 163 |
| 9 | (Netherlands) Dione Housheer | Odense Håndbold | 161 |
| 9 | (Norway) Ingvild Bakkerud | Ikast Håndbold | 161 |

=== All-star team - Regular season ===
All star team regular season 2022-23

| Position | Name | Club |
|---|---|---|
| Goalkeeper | (Germany) Katharina Filter | København Håndbold |
| Right wing | (Norway) Emilie Hovden | Viborg HK |
| Right back | (Netherlands) Dione Housheer | Odense Håndbold |
| Centre back | (Norway) Henny Reistad | Team Esbjerg |
| Left back | (Denmark) Stine Jørgensen | København Håndbold |
| Left wing | (Denmark) Rikke Hoffbeck | Skanderborg Håndbold |
| Pivot | (Denmark) Alberte Simonsen | Ringkøbing Håndbold |

=== All-stars ===
All-star team for the Kvindeligaen 2022-23 entire season:

| Position | Name | Club |
|---|---|---|
| Goalkeeper | (Denmark) Anna Kristensen | Team Esbjerg |
| Right wing | (Norway) Emilie Hovden | Viborg HK |
| Right back | (Netherlands) Dione Housheer | Odense Håndbold |
| Centre back | (Norway) Henny Reistad | Team Esbjerg |
| Left back | (Denmark) Stine Jørgensen | København Håndbold |
| Left wing | (Denmark) Elma Halilcevic | Nykøbing Falster Håndboldklub |
| Pivot | (Norway) Vilde Mortensen Ingstad | Team Esbjerg |
| MVP | (Norway) Henny Reistad | Team Esbjerg |
| Talent of the year | (Denmark) Julie Scaglione | Ikast Håndbold |

=== Coach of the season ===
(Denmark) Jesper Bangshøj
