= Mikael Ström =

Swedish footballer

Mikael Ström (born 1 February 1977) is a Swedish former professional footballer who played as a defender for IFK Norrköping between 1994 and 2004. His first goal came against AIK.
