= Johan Anegrund =

Swedish footballer

Personal information
- Date of birth: 31 March 1973 (age 53)
- Place of birth: Sweden
- Height: 1.82 m (6 ft 0 in)
- Position: Defender

Senior career*
Years	Team	Apps	(Gls)
1989–1991	Skiljebo SK	36	(0)
1991–2000	IFK Göteborg	39	(1)
1998	→ Västra Frölunda IF (loan)	23	(0)
2000–2006	Örgryte IS	118	(10)

International career^{‡}
1999	Sweden	1	(0)
- * Club domestic league appearances and goals as of 26 October 2017 (UTC) ‡ National team caps and goals as of 26 October (UTC)

Johan Anegrund (born 31 March 1973) is a Swedish retired footballer who played as a defender. During his club career, Anegrund played for Skiljebo SK, IFK Göteborg, Västra Frölunda IF and Örgryte IS. He made 1 appearance for the Sweden national team.

== Honours ==
IFK Göteborg

- Allsvenskan: 1994, 1995, 1996
- Svenska Cupen: 1991, 1999-2000
