= Jane Mejlvang =

Danish handball player (born 1995)

Personal information
- Full name: Jane Sønderbæk Mejlvang
- Nationality: Danish
- Born: 2 August 1995 (age 31) Ringkøbing, Denmark
- Height: 1.81 m (5 ft 11 in)

Sport
- Sport: Handball
- Position: Centre Back
- Current club: Ringkøbing Håndbold
- Number: 15

Senior clubs
- Years: Team
- 2013-2016: FC Midtjylland Håndbold
- 2016-2019: Ringkøbing Håndbold
- 2019-2020: Silkeborg-Voel KFUM
- 2020-: Ringkøbing Håndbold

Jane Mejlvang (born 2 August 1995) is a Danish handball player who currently plays for Ringkøbing Håndbold. This is her second tenure at the club, returning after playing a single season at Silkeborg-Voel KFUM in 2019/2020.

In the 2022–23 season she was the topscorer in the ordinary season of the Danish Handball League with 152 goals. Overall for the entire season she was number two, surpassed by Henny Reistad.
