= Cecilie Brandt =

Danish handball player (born 2001)

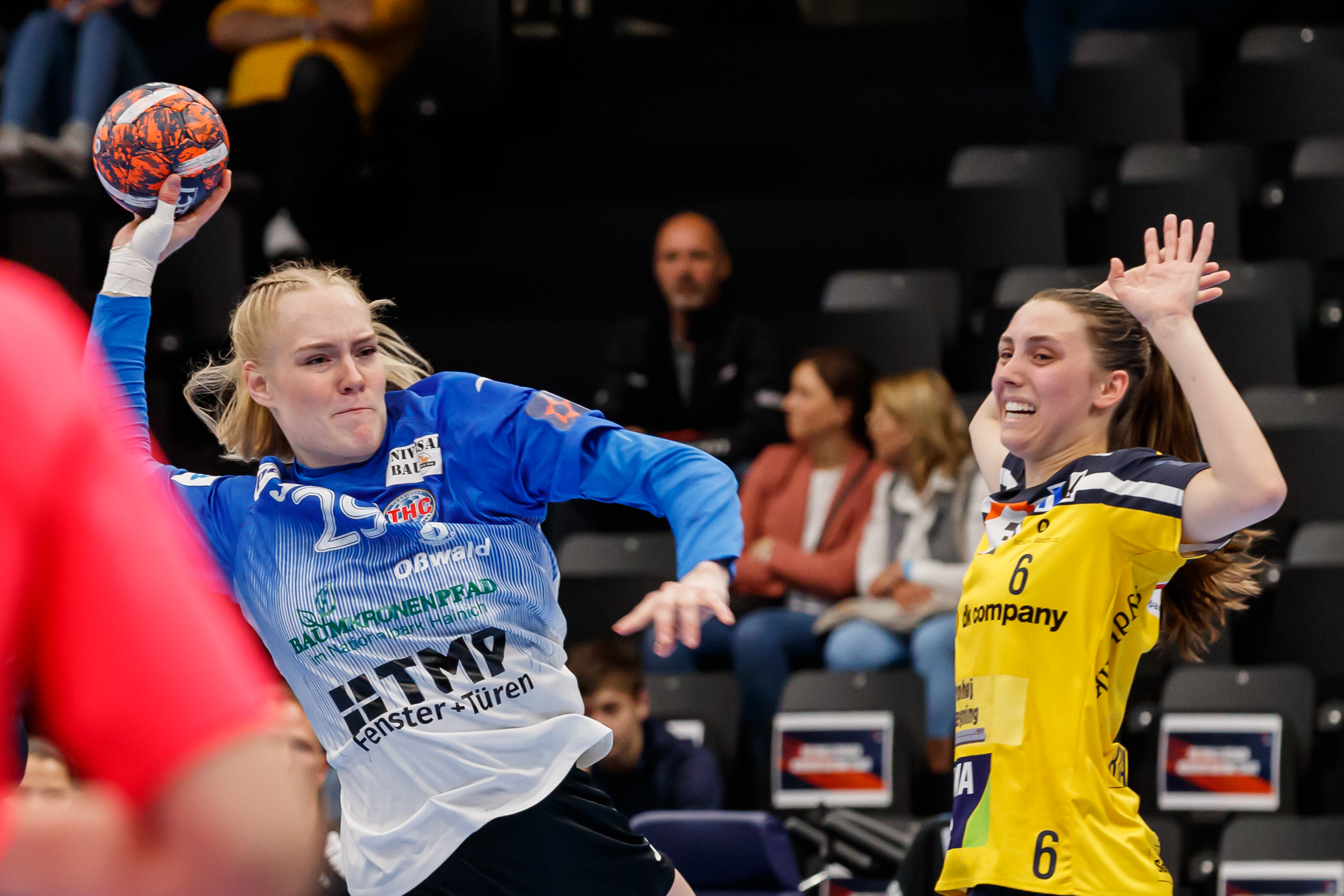
- Brandt (right) in 2023

Personal information
- Full name: Cecilie Højgaard Brandt
- Nationality: Danish
- Born: 16 November 2001 (age 24) Viborg, Denmark
- Height: 1.71 m (5 ft 7 in)

Sport
- Sport: Handball
- Position: Right wing
- Current club: Ikast Håndbold
- Number: 6

Youth career
- Years: Team
- 2018–2020: Herning-Ikast Håndbold

Senior clubs
- Years: Team
- 2020–: Ikast Håndbold
National team
Years	Team	Apps	(Gls)
2022–	Denmark	24	(44)
Medal record
European Championship
Silver medal – second place	2022 Slovenia/North Macedonia/Montenegro
European Youth Olympic Festival
Bronze medal – third place	2017 Győr
- Updated on 12 April 2026

Cecilie Højgaard Brandt (born 16 November 2001) is a Danish handball player who plays for Ikast Håndbold in the Damehåndboldligaen and the Danish national team.

She also represented Denmark in the 2019 Women's U-19 European Handball Championship, placing 6th.

She made her debut on the Danish national team on 5 March 2022 against Romania, appearing for the team during the EHF Women's Euro 2022 qualifying cycle.

== Achievements ==
- Damehåndboldligaen:
  - Bronze Medalist: 2021, 2022
- EHF European League:
  - Winner: 2023
