= 2013–14 EHF Women's Champions League Final Four =

The 2014 EHF Women's Champions League Final Four was the final stage of the 2013–14 EHF Women's Champions League, the 53rd season of Europe's premier club handball tournament organized by European Handball Federation. The event was the first Final Four tournament in the competition's history, having been introduced in November 2013. It was played at the László Papp Budapest Sports Arena in Budapest, Hungary on 3–4 May 2014.

== Host selection ==
The Executive Committee of the European Handball Federation (EHF) opened the bidding process for the organization of the event on 24 July 2013. The EHF received four bids until the deadline of 10 September 2013, including three from Hungary, all of them naming the László Papp Budapest Sports Arena as the possible host arena; and one from Slovenia, that proposed the Arena Stožice.

Overview of the applications
Bidding organization	Venue	City	Capacity
Hungarofest with the Hungarian Handball Federation	Budapest Sports Arena	Budapest	9,100
Nexus Communications	Budapest Sports Arena	Budapest	9,100
RK Krim Ljubljana	Arena Stožice	Ljubljana	12,500
SportConcept	Budapest Sports Arena	Budapest	9,100

In the first round the bids of Nexus Communications and SportConcept were eliminated, leaving the application of RK Krim Ljubljana and the joint bid of Hungarofest and the Hungarian Handball Federation in competition. After close examinations of the remaining bids, on 21 November 2013, the EHF Finance Delegation on behalf of the EHF Executive Committee awarded the organization rights to Budapest.

== Tournament ==
=== Bracket ===
Semifinals
3 May 2014
(North Macedonia) ŽRK Vardar	20
(Montenegro) Budućnost (ET)	22
3 May 2014
(Hungary) Győri Audi ETO KC	29
(Denmark) FC Midtjylland	26

Final
4 May 2014
(Montenegro) Budućnost	21
(Hungary) Győri Audi ETO KC	27
Third-place playoff
4 May 2014
(North Macedonia) ŽRK Vardar	34
(Denmark) FC Midtjylland	31

=== Semifinals ===
3 May 2014; 15:00	Győri Audi ETO KC (Hungary)	29–26	(Denmark) FC Midtjylland Håndbold	László Papp Budapest Sports Arena, Budapest; Attendance: 9,000; Referees: Florescu, Stoia (ROU)
3 May 2014; 15:00	Görbicz 7	(16–11)	Groot 9	László Papp Budapest Sports Arena, Budapest; Attendance: 9,000; Referees: Florescu, Stoia (ROU)
3 May 2014; 15:00	2× (yellow card) 2× (suspension)	Report	3× (yellow card) 4× (suspension)	László Papp Budapest Sports Arena, Budapest; Attendance: 9,000; Referees: Florescu, Stoia (ROU)

3 May 2014
17:30
ŽRK Vardar (North Macedonia)
20–22 (ET)
(Montenegro) ŽRK Budućnost Podgorica
László Papp Budapest Sports Arena, Budapest
Attendance: 9,000
Referees: Arntsen, Røen (NOR)
Lekić 6
(6–11)
Neagu 6
3× (yellow card) 3× (suspension)
Report
2× (yellow card) 8× (suspension)

FT: 16–16 ET: 4–6

=== Third-place playoff ===
4 May 2014; 14:30	ŽRK Vardar (North Macedonia)	34–31	(Denmark) FC Midtjylland Håndbold	László Papp Budapest Sports Arena, Budapest; Attendance: 10,000; Referees: Alpaidze, Berezkina (RUS)
4 May 2014; 14:30	Nikolić, Radičević 6	(14–12)	Groot 11	László Papp Budapest Sports Arena, Budapest; Attendance: 10,000; Referees: Alpaidze, Berezkina (RUS)
4 May 2014; 14:30	3× (yellow card) 8× (suspension)	Report	2× (yellow card) 1× (suspension)	László Papp Budapest Sports Arena, Budapest; Attendance: 10,000; Referees: Alpaidze, Berezkina (RUS)

=== Final ===
4 May 2014; 17:00	ŽRK Budućnost Podgorica (Montenegro)	21–27	(Hungary) Győri Audi ETO KC	László Papp Budapest Sports Arena, Budapest; Attendance: 10,000; Referees: Bonaventura, Bonaventura (FRA)
4 May 2014; 17:00	Neagu 7	(10–15)	Görbicz 7	László Papp Budapest Sports Arena, Budapest; Attendance: 10,000; Referees: Bonaventura, Bonaventura (FRA)
4 May 2014; 17:00	3× (yellow card) 5× (suspension)	Report	3× (yellow card) 2× (suspension) 1× (red card)	László Papp Budapest Sports Arena, Budapest; Attendance: 10,000; Referees: Bonaventura, Bonaventura (FRA)
