= Jeppe Vestergaard =

Danish footballer (born 1972)

Personal information
- Full name: Jeppe Vestergaard
- Date of birth: 22 September 1972 (age 54)
- Height: 1.87 m (6 ft 2 in)
- Position: Defender

Senior career*
Years	Team	Apps	(Gls)
1996–2001	Herfølge BK	75	(3)
2001–2002	Silkeborg IF	8	(0)
2002–2003	Malmö FF	5	(0)
2002–2003	Vejle BK (loan)	4	(0)
2003–2004	Herfølge BK	18	(0)
- * Club domestic league appearances and goals

Jeppe Vestergaard is a Danish former footballer who played as a defender. Tom Prahl said he had a good left foot.

== Career ==
Vestergaard started playing football when he was 5 at Hærfølge BK. Here he debuted for the first team in the 1996/1997. Vestergaard was part of the Herfølge squad that won the 1999–2000 Danish Superliga after being promoted from the Danish 1st Division just one season prior. This is the first time, and until today the only team that has managed to do so. Vestergaard played only 5 matches during the season, as a knee injury kept him out after November. Injuries would be a stable throughout his career.

He switched to Swedish club Malmö FF in 2002, but because of issues with player licenses, he could not debut for the club and was thus loaned back to Denmark to Vejle BK. In the summer of 2002 he debuted for Malmö FF. In 2003 he informed Malmö that he would like to leave the club due to a lack of playing time, and thus he returned to his childhood club, Herfølge. The following season, 2003/2004, he would play 18 matches, the most he had played for 5 seasons. In the summer of 2004 he retired at only age 28 due to yet another cruciate ligament injury.
