= Ikast Håndbold =

Danish handball club

- Full name: Ikast Håndbold
- Founded: 20 June 1970
- Arena: IBF Arena
- Capacity: 3,000
- President: Daniel Grønhøj Rytter Hansen
- Head coach: Claus Mogensen
- Captain: Stine Skogrand
- League: Bambusa Kvindeligaen
- 2025–26: 4th
- Club colours
Home	Away

Location of Ikast Håndbold

Ikast Håndbold is a Danish professional women's handball club based in Ikast. They have competed in Damehåndboldligaen, Denmark's primary handball league, since 1991.

== History ==
The club was founded as Ikast FS Håndboldafdeling on 20 June 1970 as a merger of the handball departments of Ikast DUI and Ikast Skytte Gymnastik Forening as a part of the multi-sports club Ikast FS. Their breakthrough came in 1991 when they won the Danish Cup and reached the top division, Dame Håndbold Ligaen. They saw success again in 1998 as they won their first Danish Championship gold.

In 1997 the elite team was placed in the company Ikast FS Elitehåndbold ApS, and they became the first Danish handball team selling stocks. In 1999 they established coorporation with Bording KFUM, and changed name to Ikast-Bording EH.

At the beginning of November 2008, it was announced that the professional division of Ikast-Brande EH had been taken over by football club FC Midtjylland. As a result, the team changed their name to FC Midtjylland Håndbold and switched colors from blue and yellow to red and black. In November 2017, it was announced that FC Midtjylland had sold off the handball team to a group of investors. From the 2018–19 season, they were renamed Herning Ikast Håndbold. In 2023 the name was changed to Ikast Håndbold to signify the connection to the founding clubs in Ikast.

=== Name ===
- 1997–1999: Ikast FS Elitehåndbold
- 1999–2008: Ikast-Bording Elitehåndbold
- 2008–2009: Ikast-Brande Elite Håndbold
- 2009–2018: FC Midtjylland Håndbold
- 2018–2022: Herning-Ikast Håndbold
- 2022– : Ikast Håndbold

== Results ==
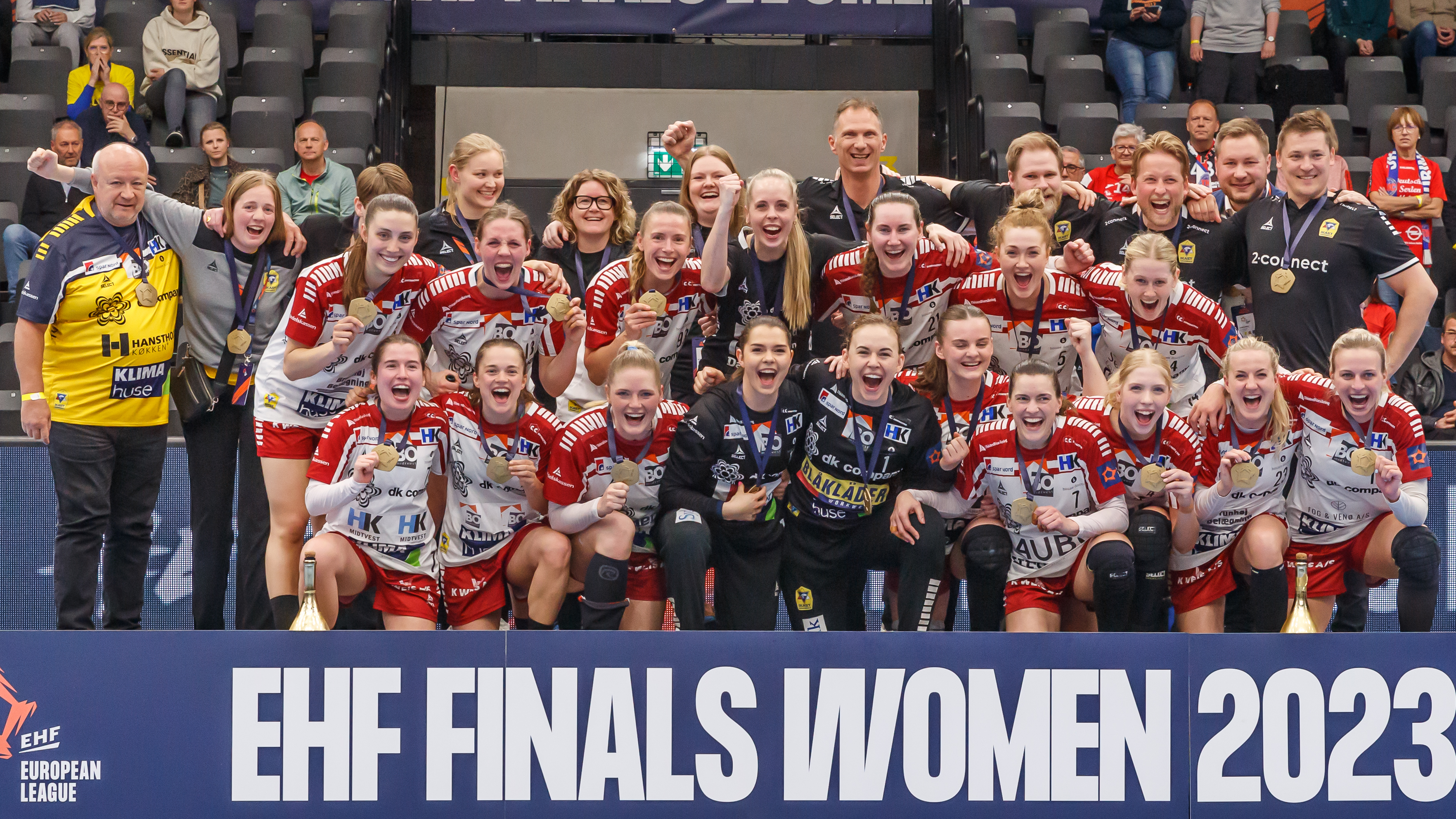
Ikast Håndbold celebrating their Women's EHF European League final win against Nykøbing Falster Håndboldklub.

- Danish Championship:
  - Gold: 1998, 2011, 2013, 2015
  - Silver: 1999, 2003, 2008, 2014, 2016, 2019
  - Bronze: 1994, 1995, 1996, 2000, 2001, 2002, 2004, 2005, 2012, 2017, 2022, 2023, 2025
- Danish Cup:
  - Winner: 1990, 1998, 1999, 2001, 2012, 2014, 2015, 2019
  - Finalist: 1994, 2002, 2003, 2004, 2013
- Danish Super Cup
  - Winner: 2013, 2014
- EHF Champions League:
  - Semifinalist: 2003, 2014
- EHF European League:
  - Winner: 2002, 2011, 2023
  - Finalist: 2007, 2025
  - Semifinalist: 2008, 2013, 2019, 2020, 2021, 2022
- EHF Cup Winners' Cup:
  - Winner: 2004, 2015
  - Semifinalist: 2000
- EHF Challenge Cup:
  - Winner: 1998
- EHF Champions Trophy:
  - Winner: 1998
  - Finalist: 2002
  - Semifinalist: 2003

== Kits ==
HOME

2018–19

AWAY

2018–19

== Team ==
=== Current squad ===
Squad for the 2026–27 season

Goalkeepers

- 1 (Norway) Olivia Lykke Nygaard
- 16 (Denmark) Amalie Milling

Wingers
LW

- 2 (Denmark) Matilde Kondrup Nielsen
- 22 (Denmark) Lærke Nolsøe (pregnant)
- 25 (Denmark) Astrid Lynnerup

RW

- 6 (Denmark) Cecilie Brandt
- 77 (Denmark) Line Mai Hougaard

Line players

- 10 (Denmark) Kathrine Heindahl
- 11 (Denmark) Sarah Iversen
- 15 (Denmark) Karen Klokker

Back players
LB

- 8 (Sweden) Jamina Roberts (pregnant)
- 9 (Denmark) Laura Borg
- 21 (Netherlands) Harma van Kreij

CB

- 14 (Sweden) Emma Lindqvist
- 38 (Denmark) Maria Wierzba
- 39 (Denmark) Melanie Bak
- 42 (Denmark) Victoria Mørk Andersen

RB

- 7 (Norway) Stine Skogrand (c)
- 27 (Sweden) Thea Kylberg

=== Retired numbers ===
FC Midtjylland Håndbold
No.	Player	Position	Tenure
3	(Denmark) Tonje Kjærgaard	Line player	1992–2004, 2007

=== Transfers ===
Transfers for the season 2027–28

Joining

- (Norway) Frida Brandbu Andersen (CB) (from (Norway) Sola HK)
- (Norway) Selma Henriksen (P) (from (Norway) Sola HK)
- (Iceland) Elín Klara Þorkelsdóttir (CB) (from (Sweden) IK Sävehof)

Leaving

- (Sweden) Jamina Roberts (CB) (to (Sweden) IK Sävehof)
- (Norway) Stine Skogrand (RB) (retires)

=== Staff members ===
- (Denmark) Head coach: Claus Mogensen
- (Denmark) Team leader: Pernille Mosegaard
- (Denmark) Team leader: Annelie Mortensen
- (Denmark) Physiotherapist: Mads Skautrup Jacobsen
- (Denmark) Physiotherapist: Christian Poulsen

=== Notable former players ===
- (Denmark) Anja Andersen (1987–1988)
- (Denmark) Henriette Mikkelsen (1997–2003)
- (Denmark) Anja Nielsen (1997–2003)
- (Denmark) Trine Jensen (2001–2004)
- (Denmark) Kristine Andersen (1998–2005)
- (Denmark) Karin Mortensen (2002–2006)
- (Denmark) Josephine Touray (2004–2005)
- (Denmark) Karen Brødsgaard (2004–2007)
- (Denmark) Tonje Kjærgaard (1992–2004, 2007)
- (Denmark) Rikke Schmidt (2006–2007)
- (Denmark) Line Fruensgaard (2008–2010)
- (Denmark) Maibritt Kviesgaard (2011–2013)
- (Denmark) Lærke Møller (2009–2014)
- (Denmark) Louise Svalastog (2007–2014)
- (Denmark) Line Jørgensen (2010–2015)
- (Denmark) Susan Thorsgaard (2008–2016)
- (Denmark) Fie Woller (2009–2016)
- (Denmark) Stine Jørgensen (2012–2017)
- (Denmark) Trine Østergaard (2008–2017)
- (Denmark) Sabine Pedersen (2014–2018)
- (Denmark) Mie Augustesen (2014–2019)
- (Denmark) Louise Burgaard (2015–2019)
- (Denmark) Emma Friis (2016–2024)
- (Denmark) Anne Mette Pedersen (2017–2019)
- (Denmark) Trine Troelsen (2017–2019)
- (Denmark) Julie Gantzel Pedersen (2017–2020, 2022–2023)
- (Denmark) Line Uno (2022–2023)
- (Denmark) Maria Lykkegaard (2023–2025)
- (Norway) Kjersti Grini (2000–2003)
- (Norway) Ragnhild Aamodt (2005–2009)
- (Norway) Kari-Anne Henriksen (2005–2009)
- (Norway) Gro Hammerseng (2003–2010)
- (Norway) Katja Nyberg (2006–2010)
- (Norway) Isabel Blanco (2001–2011)
- (Norway) Tonje Nøstvold (2008–2011)
- (Norway) Ingrid Ødegård (2008–2012)
- (Norway) Ida Alstad (2014–2015)
- (Norway) Veronica Kristiansen (2015–2018)
- (Norway) Tonje Løseth (2017–2020)
- (Norway) Jeanett Kristiansen (2019–2020)
- (Norway) Vilde Johansen (2019–2023)
- (Norway) Andrea Austmo Pedersen (2022–2024)
- (Norway) Ingvild Bakkerud (2020–2025)
- (Norway) Emily Stang Sando (2025)
- (Sweden) Jessica Ryde (2017–2023)
- (Sweden) Linnea Torstenson (2010–2012)
- (Sweden) Johanna Ahlm (2015–2016)
- (Sweden) Sabina Jacobsen (2014–2017)
- (Sweden) Linn Blohm (2016–2018)
- (Sweden) Irma Schjött (2023–2025)
- (Sweden) Kristina Jönsson (1998–2002)
- (Netherlands) Debbie Bont (2011–2012)
- (Netherlands) Nycke Groot (2011–2015)
- (Romania) Narcisa Lecușanu (2002–2004)
- (Romania) Eliza Buceschi (2016)
- (Germany) Sabine Englert (2009–2022)
- (Germany) Grit Jurack (2001–2003)
- (Czech Republic) Markéta Jeřábková (2023–2025)
- (France) Valerie Nicolas (2007–2008)
- (Hungary) Beáta Siti (2000–2002)
- (Serbia) Tanja Milanović (2004–2008)

== Head coach history ==
(Denmark)	Lars Friis-Hansen	1998–2001
(Denmark)	Christian Dalmose	2001–2003
(Norway)	Morten Fjeldstad	2004
(Sweden)	Magnus Johansson	2004–2006
(Denmark)	Ole Damgaard	2006–2007
(Denmark)	Kenneth Jensen	2007–2011
(Denmark)	Ryan Zinglersen	2011–2012
(Denmark)	Helle Thomsen	2012–2016
(Denmark)	Kristian Kristensen	2016–2019
(Denmark)	Mathias Madsen	2019–2020
(Denmark)	Kasper Christensen	2020–2024
(Denmark)	Søren Reinholt Hansen	2024–2025

=== ALPI Legends ===
In November 2017, FC Midtjylland Håndbold introduced the ALPI Legends, an award presented annually to players, coaches and staffers who have meant something special to FC Midtjylland Håndbold through the time.

- 2017: Tonje Kjærgaard and Sabine Englert

== Statistics ==
=== Top scorers in the EHF Champions League ===
Last updated on 28 March 2026

Rank	Name	Seasons played	Goals
1	(Denmark) Stine Jørgensen	4	191
2	(Norway) Veronica Kristiansen	3	182
3	(Denmark) Trine Østergaard	5	146
4	(Norway) Stine Skogrand	2	141
5	(Denmark) Julie Scaglione	2	134
6	(Denmark) Louise Burgaard	3	117
7	(Norway) Gro Hammerseng	3	111
8	(Denmark) Emma Friis	3	110
9	(Czech Republic) Markéta Jeřábková	1	100
10	(Denmark) Trine Troelsen	3	99

=== Top scorers in the EHF European League ===
Last updated on 27 June 2025

Rank	Name	Seasons played	Goals
1	(Norway) Ingvild Bakkerud	4	178
2	(Norway) Stine Skogrand	4	131
3	(Denmark) Emma Friis	3	127
4	(Sweden) Emma Lindqvist	3	105
5	(Denmark) Cecilie Brandt	4	95
6	(Denmark) Simone Petersen	4	79
7	(Denmark) Julie Scaglione	4	75
8	(Denmark) Line Mai Hougaard	4	74
9	(Norway) Helene Gigstad Fauske	1	61
10	(Denmark) Naja Nissen Kristensen	2	53

== European record ==
=== EHF Champions League ===
Season	Competition	Round	Club	1st leg	2nd leg	Aggregate
2013–14	EHF Champions League	Group stage (Group B)	(Montenegro) ŽRK Budućnost	21–19	15–22	1st place
2013–14	EHF Champions League	Group stage (Group B)	(Hungary) FTC-Rail Cargo Hungaria	32–23	26–25	1st place
2013–14	EHF Champions League	Group stage (Group B)	(Poland) SPR Lublin SSA	37–26	22–15	1st place
2013–14	EHF Champions League	Main round (Group 1)	(North Macedonia) ŽRK Vardar	24–28	22–24	4th place
2013–14	EHF Champions League	Main round (Group 1)	(Germany) Thüringer HC	25–24	23–24	4th place
2013–14	EHF Champions League	Main round (Group 1)	(Sweden) IK Sävehof	25–24	29–29	4th place
2013–14	EHF Champions League	Semifinal	(Hungary) Győri ETO	26–29		
2013–14	EHF Champions League	Third-place playoff	(North Macedonia) ŽRK Vardar	31–34		
2015–16	EHF Champions League	Group stage (Group C)	(Hungary) Győri ETO	22–22	26–21	3rd place
2015–16	EHF Champions League	Group stage (Group C)	(North Macedonia) ŽRK Vardar	15–25	24–33	3rd place
2015–16	EHF Champions League	Group stage (Group C)	(Austria) Hypo Niederösterreich	33–21	33–27	3rd place
2015–16	EHF Champions League	Main round (Group 2)	(Montenegro) ŽRK Budućnost	18–28	21–27	5th place
2015–16	EHF Champions League	Main round (Group 2)	(Romania) CSM București	23–28	22–24	5th place
2015–16	EHF Champions League	Main round (Group 2)	(Sweden) IK Sävehof	25–21	24–32	5th place
2016–17	EHF Champions League	Group stage (Group C)	(Hungary) Győri ETO	27–23	19–31	3rd place
2016–17	EHF Champions League	Group stage (Group C)	(Romania) CSM București	24–21	20–26	3rd place
2016–17	EHF Champions League	Group stage (Group C)	(Russia) Rostov-Don	25–23	20–26	3rd place
2016–17	EHF Champions League	Main round (Group 2)	(Norway) Larvik HK	24–28	22–24	4th place
2016–17	EHF Champions League	Main round (Group 2)	(Slovenia) RK Krim	28–19	27–21	4th place
2016–17	EHF Champions League	Main round (Group 2)	(Denmark) Team Esbjerg	38–26	21–22	4th place
2016–17	EHF Champions League	Quarterfinals	(North Macedonia) ŽRK Vardar	26–28	24–26	50–54
2017–18	EHF Champions League	Group stage (Group B)	(Hungary) Győri ETO	24–27	16–27	3rd place
2017–18	EHF Champions League	Group stage (Group B)	(Russia) Rostov-Don	24–21	20-27	3rd place
2017–18	EHF Champions League	Group stage (Group B)	(France) Brest Bretagne Handball	27–23	23–22	3rd place
2017–18	EHF Champions League	Main round (Group 1)	(Romania) CSM București	26–31	24–29	4th place
2017–18	EHF Champions League	Main round (Group 1)	(Denmark) Nykøbing Falster Håndboldklub	24–20	21–21	4th place
2017–18	EHF Champions League	Main round (Group 1)	(Slovenia) RK Krim	24–24	23–24	4th place
2017–18	EHF Champions League	Quarterfinals	(North Macedonia) ŽRK Vardar	23–24	25–32	48–56
2023–24	EHF Champions League	Group stage Group B	(Denmark) Team Esbjerg	34–35	34–37	3rd place
2023–24	EHF Champions League	Group stage Group B	(France) Metz Handball	39–36	35–34	3rd place
2023–24	EHF Champions League	Group stage Group B	(Norway) Vipers Kristiansand	30–26	32–31	3rd place
2023–24	EHF Champions League	Group stage Group B	(Romania) CS Rapid București	35–27	30–29	3rd place
2023–24	EHF Champions League	Group stage Group B	(Hungary) Ferencvárosi TC	36–37	28–28	3rd place
2023–24	EHF Champions League	Group stage Group B	(Poland) Zagłębie Lubin	41–29	35–26	3rd place
2023–24	EHF Champions League	Group stage Group B	(Slovenia) RK Krim Mercator	33–32	34–28	3rd place
2023–24	EHF Champions League	Play-offs	(Germany) SG BBM Bietigheim	31–31	27–29	58–60
2025–26	EHF Champions League	Group B	(Romania) CSM București	28–27	24–33	5th place
2025–26	EHF Champions League	Group B	(Denmark) Odense Håndbold	28–35	30–33	5th place
2025–26	EHF Champions League	Group B	(France) Brest Bretagne Handball	33–36	37–35	5th place
2025–26	EHF Champions League	Group B	(Hungary) Ferencvárosi TC	24–27	27–28	5th place
2025–26	EHF Champions League	Group B	(Slovenia) RK Krim Mercator	27–25	35–33	5th place
2025–26	EHF Champions League	Group B	(Croatia) RK Podravka Koprivnica	36–30	33–29	5th place
2025–26	EHF Champions League	Group B	(Norway) Sola HK	31–22	32–23	5th place
2025–26	EHF Champions League	Play-offs	(Romania) CS Gloria Bistrița	34–35	28–37	62–72

=== EHF Cup Winners' Cup ===
Season	Competition	Round	Club	1st leg	2nd leg	Aggregate
2014–15	EHF Cup Winners' Cup	Round 3	(Russia) HC Kuban Krasnodar	34–23	31–17	65–40
2014–15	EHF Cup Winners' Cup	Round of 16	(Romania) HCM Roman	24–20	29–21	53–41
2014–15	EHF Cup Winners' Cup	Quarterfinals	(Poland) SPR Lublin SSA	35–25	30–18	65–43
2014–15	EHF Cup Winners' Cup	Semifinals	(Hungary) FTC-Rail Cargo Hungaria	30–23	31–29	61–52
2014–15	EHF Cup Winners' Cup	Finals	(France) Fleury Loiret	22–23	24–19	46–42

=== EHF European League (EHF Cup) ===
Season	Competition	Round	Club	1st leg	2nd leg	Aggregate
2010–11	EHF Cup	Round of 32	(Serbia) HC Naisa	31–23	31–26	62–49
2010–11	EHF Cup	Round of 16	(France) Le Havre	28–14	24–23	52–37
2010–11	EHF Cup	Quarterfinals	(Denmark) Team Esbjerg	27–21	24–29	51–50
2010–11	EHF Cup	Semifinals	(Germany) VfL Oldenburg	27–19	25–29	52–48
2010–11	EHF Cup	Final	(Denmark) Team Tvis Holstebro	24–26	28–21	52–47
2012–13	EHF Cup	Second qualifying round	(Spain) BM Alcobendas	37–14	37–18	74–32
2012–13	EHF Cup	Round of 16	(Slovenia) RK Zagorje	31–28	28–22	59–50
2012–13	EHF Cup	Quarterfinals	(Russia) HC Kuban Krasnodar	39–21	26–22	65–43
2012–13	EHF Cup	Semifinals	(Denmark) Team Tvis Holstebro	22–29	24–18	46–47
2018–19	EHF Cup	Round 3	(Romania) SCM Râmnicu Vâlcea	22–16	21–19	43–35
2018–19	EHF Cup	Group B	(Sweden) IK Sävehof	29–22	33–23	2nd place
2018–19	EHF Cup	Group B	(Hungary) Siófok KC	22–34	21–25	2nd place
2018–19	EHF Cup	Group B	(Germany) TusSies Metzingen	31–28	28–25	2nd place
2018–19	EHF Cup	Quarterfinals	(Croatia) RK Podravka Koprivnica	34–26	18–24	52–50
2018–19	EHF Cup	Semifinals	(Denmark) Team Esbjerg	20–23	16–30	36–53
2019–20	EHF Cup	Round 2	(Belarus) HC Gomel	33–21	21–25	54–46
2019–20	EHF Cup	Round 3	(Denmark) Nykøbing Falster	31–26	23–23	49–44
2019–20	EHF Cup	Group D	(Germany) SG BBM Bietigheim	33–25	26–26	1st place
2019–20	EHF Cup	Group D	(Russia) HC Lada	28–38	25–20	1st place
2019–20	EHF Cup	Group D	(Norway) Storhamar HE	34–27	24–26	1st place
2019–20	EHF Cup	Quarterfinals	(Romania) CS Gloria 2018 Bistrița-Năsăud	28–26	29–26	57–52
2019–20	EHF Cup	Semi-finals	(Croatia) RK Podravka Koprivnica	Cancelled		
2020–21	EHF European League	Group A	(Hungary) Váci NKSE	39–29	38–26	1st place
2020–21	EHF European League	Group A	(Russia) Zvezda Zvenigorod	34–25	39–31	1st place
2020–21	EHF European League	Group A	(France) Paris 92	25–23	23–26	1st place
2020–21	EHF European League	Quarterfinals	(Russia) HC Lada	28–25	31–29	59–54
2020–21	EHF European League	Semi-final (F4)	(Hungary) Siófok KC	34–36		
2020–21	EHF European League	Third place match (F4)	(Romania) Minaur Baia Mare	31–33		
2021–22	EHF European League	Round 3	(Hungary) MTK Budapest	34–29	34–27	68–56
2021–22	EHF European League	Group C	(Russia) HC Lada	34–27	27–24	1st
2021–22	EHF European League	Group C	(Romania) Măgura Cisnădie	31–28	34–31	1st
2021–22	EHF European League	Group C	(Norway) Storhamar HE	32–24	35–27	1st
2021–22	EHF European League	Quarterfinals	(Romania) SCM Râmnicu Vâlcea	33–28	39–33	72–61
2021–22	EHF European League	Semi-final (F4)	(Germany) SG BBM Bietigheim	33–34		
2021–22	EHF European League	Third place match (F4)	(Romania) CS Minaur Baia Mare	29–28		
2022–23	EHF European League; Winner	Group B	(Hungary) Motherson Mosonmagyaróvár	28–26	34–26	1st
2022–23	EHF European League; Winner	Group B	(France) Neptunes de Nantes	30–20	33–28	1st
2022–23	EHF European League; Winner	Group B	(Norway) Fana	29–23	35–24	1st
2022–23	EHF European League; Winner	Quarterfinals	(Hungary) Siófok KC	31–21	30–20	61–41
2022–23	EHF European League; Winner	Semi-final (F4)	(Germany) Thüringer HC	31–26		
2022–23	EHF European League; Winner	Final (F4)	(Denmark) Nykøbing Falster Håndbold	31–24		
2024–25	EHF European League	Group B	(Norway) Sola HK	35–34	32–26	2nd
2024–25	EHF European League	Group B	(Germany) Borussia Dortmund	29–25	27–30	2nd
2024–25	EHF European League	Group B	(Romania) SCM Râmnicu Vâlcea	26–27	36–34	2nd
2024–25	EHF European League	Quarterfinals	(Romania) HC Dunărea Brăila	32–30	29–30	61–60
2024–25	EHF European League	Semi-final (F4)	(Germany) HSG Blomberg-Lippe	28–18		
2024–25	EHF European League	Final (F4)	(Germany) Thüringer HC	32–34		

== Kit manufacturers ==
- (Japan) Mizuno (2018-)
