= 2024–25 REMA 1000-ligaen (women's handball) =

REMA 1000-ligaen
- Season: 2024–25
- Champions: Storhamar HE
- Relegated: Vipers Kristiansand (withdrawn)
- EHF Champions League: Storhamar HE; Sola HK
- EHF European League: Larvik HK; Molde Elite; Tertnes HE
- Top goalscorer: Maja Furu Sæteren (192 goals)
- Biggest home win: 21 goals: STO 44–23 FOL
- Biggest away win: 26 goals: HAS 16–42 LHK
- Highest scoring: 77 goals: MOL 41–36 TER
- All statistics correct as of 22 May 2025.

The 2024–25 REMA 1000-ligaen was the 58th season of REMA 1000-ligaen, Norway's premier handball league. Storhamar HE won their first ever title, and did so undefeated.

== Teams ==
Locations of the 2024/25 REMA 1000-ligaen teams

=== Team changes ===
Promoted from First Division	Relegated from 2023–24 REMA 1000-ligaen
Haslum Topphåndballforening	Aker Topphåndball

=== Stadiums ===
Team	Location	Arena	Capacity
Byåsen HE	Trondheim	Kolstad Arena	2,500
Fana Håndball	Bergen	Fana Arena	1,206
Follo HK Damer	Ski	Stil Arena	2,500
Fredrikstad BK	Fredrikstad	Kongstenhallen	1,500
Gjerpen HK Skien	Skien	Gjerpenhallen	300
Haslum Topphåndballforening	Bærum	Nadderud Arena	2,050
Larvik HK	Larvik	Jotron Arena Larvik	4,000
Molde Elite	Molde	Molde Arena	2,000
Oppsal Håndball	Oslo	Oppsal Arena	5,000
Romerike Ravens	Rælingen	Skedsmohallen	3,500
Sola HK	Sola	Åsenhallen	1,200
Storhamar HE	Hamar	Boligpartner Arena	1,650
Tertnes HE	Bergen	Åsane Arena	2,220
~~Vipers~~	~~Kristiansand~~	~~Aquarama~~	~~2,200~~

== Regular season ==
The teams placed 12th and 13th will have to play relegation playoff matches this season, against the teams placed 2nd and 3rd in the first division.

=== Standings ===
Pos	Team	Pld	W	D	L	GF	GA	GD	Pts	Qualification or relegation
1	Storhamar	24	21	3	0	763	555	+208	45	Championship play-offs
2	Sola	24	19	2	3	755	630	+125	40	Championship play-offs
3	Larvik	24	19	1	4	798	621	+177	39	Championship play-offs
4	Molde	24	14	2	8	791	709	+82	30	Championship play-offs
5	Tertnes	24	12	0	12	715	702	+13	24	Championship play-offs
6	Fana	24	10	2	12	686	726	−40	22	Championship play-offs
7	Byåsen	24	10	2	12	710	725	−15	22	Championship play-offs
8	Oppsal	24	11	0	13	700	708	−8	22	Championship play-offs
9	Fredrikstad	24	9	3	12	658	703	−45	21	
10	Gjerpen	24	10	0	14	690	713	−23	20	
11	Follo	24	5	0	19	614	750	−136	10	
12	Ravens	24	3	3	18	592	758	−166	9	Play-off against the 2nd and 3rd from First Division
13	Haslum	24	2	4	18	579	751	−172	8	Play-off against the 2nd and 3rd from First Division
14	~~Vipers~~	0	0	0	0	0	0	0	0	Withdrawn

Updated to match(es) played on 5 April 2025. Source:
Rules for classification: 1.) Points in head-to-head matches amongst tied teams; 2.) Goal difference in head-to-head matches amongst tied teams; 3.) Goals scored in head-to-head matches among tied teams; 4.) Points in all matches; 5.) Goal difference in all matches.

=== Results ===
In the table below the home teams are listed on the left and the away teams along the top.

Home \ Away	BYÅ	FAN	FOL	FBK	HAS	GJE	LHK	MOL	OPP	RAV	SOL	STO	TER	~~VIP~~
Byåsen		31–31	30–34	35–32	32–23	34–32	25–31	37–33	36–26	29–26	27–38	24–27	29–37	Cancelled
Fana	38–23		30–19	26–35	32–19	26–25	30–28	19–31	27–32	35–29	27–35	20–35	22–31	Annulled
Follo	22–22	28–33		25–28	34–23	28–30	18–34	30–31	20–41	24–22	27–32	18–42	25–26	Cancelled
Fredrikstad	24–32	31–20	21–33		23–23	40–26	28–33	29–26	21–26	22–24	35–40	22–42	26–31	Cancelled
Haslum	25–33	28–29	22–21	21–30		24–34	16–42	28–37	34–31	21–21	33–33	25–33	25–32	Cancelled
Gjerpen	38–34	41–31	32–30	30–32	24–23		22–26	23–41	34–22	36–23	26–31	21–27	35–30	Annulled
Larvik	32–24	40–22	39–26	36–16	48–28	34–24		34–31	30–22	31–28	21–23	23–29	28–29	Cancelled
Molde	35–30	30–41	36–33	42–27	33–21	26–24	28–37		27–35	36–21	31–31	29–33	41–36	Cancelled
Oppsal	23–26	28–37	36–19	23–32	29–26	32–29	33–34	24–31		31–30	30–31	22–33	34–29	Cancelled
Ravens	26–40	35–27	24–27	25–25	27–27	22–29	32–42	26–45	26–32		18–36	11–34	28–24	Annulled
Sola	32–26	31–25	30–25	29–21	32–19	32–28	30–33	32–28	40–30	33–21		29–31	30–23	Annulled
Storhamar	30–25	32–32	44–23	35–26	30–19	32–22	23–23	24–24	29–25	37–25	25–15		29–28	Annulled
Tertnes	30–26	29–26	32–23	30–34	31–26	33–25	34–39	34–39	27–33	35–22	20–30	24–27		Annulled
~~Vipers~~	Annulled	Cancelled	Annulled	Annulled	Annulled	Cancelled	Cancelled	Annulled	Cancelled	Cancelled	Cancelled	Cancelled	Cancelled	

Updated to match(es) played on 5 April 2025. Source: NHF
Legend: Blue = home team win; Yellow = draw; Red = away team win.

== Championship play-offs ==
Best of three format is applied in all play-off stages, with the higher seeded team playing the first and third game (if necessary) at home. If a game ended with a draw after the regular time, it will proceed to two 5-minutes periods of extra time. If there is still a draw, another 2 × 5-minutes extra time will be played. If the scores are still level after two extra times, the winners are decided by a 7-meter shootout.

Top ranked teams from the regular season choose their opponents in the quarterfinal and semifinal stages. The remaining two highest ranked teams after the quarterfinal stage can not meet in the semifinals.

=== Bracket ===
Quarterfinals
1	Storhamar	28	33
8	Oppsal	19	32
3	Larvik	35	41
6	Fana	34	35
2	Sola	36	31
7	Byåsen	27	26
4	Molde	34	29
5	Tertnes	35	33

Semifinals
1	Storhamar	28	30
3	Larvik	22	22
2	Sola	33	25	27
5	Tertnes	32	26	35

Final
1	Storhamar	33	33
5	Tertnes	25	30

=== Quarterfinals ===
27 April; 18:00	Storhamar	28–19	Oppsal	OBOS Arena, Hamar; Attendance: 602; Referees: Røneid, Snersrud
27 April; 18:00	Obaidli 8	Report	Lund, Røhne 3	OBOS Arena, Hamar; Attendance: 602; Referees: Røneid, Snersrud
27 April; 18:00	2× (suspension)		3× (suspension)	OBOS Arena, Hamar; Attendance: 602; Referees: Røneid, Snersrud

30 April
18:30
Oppsal
32–33 (ET)
Storhamar
Oppsal Arena, Oslo
Attendance: 424
Referees: Eriksen, Kvakic
Løken 9
(15–17)
Solås 9

Report
1× (yellow card)

FT: 27–27 ET: 5–6

Storhamar won series, 2–0.

26 April
18:00
Larvik
35–34 (ET)
Fana
Bergslihallen, Larvik
Attendance: 329
Referees: Bjørheim, Sæthern
Sæteren 9
(14–20)
Mortvedt 8
1× (yellow card) 1× (suspension)
Report
1× (suspension)

FT: 31–31 ET: 4–3

30 April; 18:00	Fana	35–41	Larvik	Fana Arena, Bergen; Attendance: 512; Referees: Førsund, Hoxha
30 April; 18:00	Alver, Andersen 9	(17–23)	Mørch 11	Fana Arena, Bergen; Attendance: 512; Referees: Førsund, Hoxha
30 April; 18:00	1× (suspension)	Report	2× (yellow card) 1× (suspension)	Fana Arena, Bergen; Attendance: 512; Referees: Førsund, Hoxha

Larvik won series, 2–0.

27 April; 18:00	Sola	36–27	Byåsen	Åsenhallen, Sola; Attendance: 382; Referees: Dale, Skjold
27 April; 18:00	Holta 7	(17–14)	Høve 8	Åsenhallen, Sola; Attendance: 382; Referees: Dale, Skjold
27 April; 18:00	3× (suspension)	Report	1× (yellow card)	Åsenhallen, Sola; Attendance: 382; Referees: Dale, Skjold

29 April; 17:30	Byåsen	26–31	Sola	Stjørdalshallen, Stjørdal; Attendance: 323; Referees: Røneid, Snersrud
29 April; 17:30	Hatle 9	(12–12)	With 7	Stjørdalshallen, Stjørdal; Attendance: 323; Referees: Røneid, Snersrud
29 April; 17:30	1× (yellow card) 4× (suspension)	Report	1× (yellow card) 3× (suspension)	Stjørdalshallen, Stjørdal; Attendance: 323; Referees: Røneid, Snersrud

Sola won series, 2–0.

24 April; 18:00	Molde	34–35	Tertnes	Frænahallen, Hustadvika; Attendance: 173; Referees: Kalløkkebakken, Valbjør
24 April; 18:00	Sand 13	(20–16)	Hagen 9	Frænahallen, Hustadvika; Attendance: 173; Referees: Kalløkkebakken, Valbjør
24 April; 18:00	1× (suspension)	Report	3× (suspension)	Frænahallen, Hustadvika; Attendance: 173; Referees: Kalløkkebakken, Valbjør

29 April; 18:30	Tertnes	33–24	Molde	Åsane Arena, Bergen; Referees: Fjeldskår, Ganz-Fjellvang
29 April; 18:30	Hagen 7	(16–14)	Muri 7	Åsane Arena, Bergen; Referees: Fjeldskår, Ganz-Fjellvang
29 April; 18:30	1× (suspension)	Report	3× (suspension)	Åsane Arena, Bergen; Referees: Fjeldskår, Ganz-Fjellvang

Tertnes won series, 2–0.

=== Semifinals ===
8 May; 18:15	Storhamar	28–22	Larvik	OBOS Arena, Hamar; Attendance: 862; Referees: Johannessen, Larsen
8 May; 18:15	Löfqvist, Obaidli 5	(18–9)	Sæteren 5	OBOS Arena, Hamar; Attendance: 862; Referees: Johannessen, Larsen
8 May; 18:15	3× (suspension)	Report	2× (suspension)	OBOS Arena, Hamar; Attendance: 862; Referees: Johannessen, Larsen

11 May; 19:15	Larvik	22–30	Storhamar	Jotron Arena, Larvik; Attendance: 427; Referees: Aksdal, Holager
11 May; 19:15	Mørch, Sæteren 4	(11–14)	Löfqvist, Obaidli, Svele 5	Jotron Arena, Larvik; Attendance: 427; Referees: Aksdal, Holager
11 May; 19:15		Report	2× (suspension)	Jotron Arena, Larvik; Attendance: 427; Referees: Aksdal, Holager

Storhamar won series, 2–0.

9 May; 18:15	Sola	33–32	Tertnes	Åsenhallen, Sola; Attendance: 586; Referees: Førsund, Hoxha
9 May; 18:15	Holta, Knutsen 9	(17–17)	Eggen 14	Åsenhallen, Sola; Attendance: 586; Referees: Førsund, Hoxha
9 May; 18:15		Report	1× (yellow card) 2× (suspension)	Åsenhallen, Sola; Attendance: 586; Referees: Førsund, Hoxha

12 May; 18:15	Tertnes	26–25	Sola	Åsane Arena, Bergen; Attendance: 743; Referees: Dasic, Husomanovic
12 May; 18:15	Eggen 9	(13–10)	Holta 8	Åsane Arena, Bergen; Attendance: 743; Referees: Dasic, Husomanovic
12 May; 18:15	1× (yellow card) 3× (suspension)	Report	1× (yellow card) 3× (suspension)	Åsane Arena, Bergen; Attendance: 743; Referees: Dasic, Husomanovic

15 May; 18:15	Sola	27–35	Tertnes	Åsenhallen, Sola; Attendance: 737; Referees: Borge, Nygren
15 May; 18:15	Holta 6	(13–15)	Hagen 7	Åsenhallen, Sola; Attendance: 737; Referees: Borge, Nygren
15 May; 18:15	1× (yellow card) 3× (suspension)	Report	5× (suspension)	Åsenhallen, Sola; Attendance: 737; Referees: Borge, Nygren

Tertnes won series, 2–1.

=== Finals ===
19 May; 18:15	Storhamar	33–25	Tertnes	OBOS Arena, Hamar; Referees: Dasic, Husomanovic
19 May; 18:15	Solås 7	(14–9)	Holtet 6	OBOS Arena, Hamar; Referees: Dasic, Husomanovic
19 May; 18:15	1× (suspension)	Report	1× (yellow card) 3× (suspension)	OBOS Arena, Hamar; Referees: Dasic, Husomanovic

22 May; 18:15	Tertnes	30–33	Storhamar	Åsane Arena, Bergen; Attendance: 1,163; Referees: Borge, Nygren
22 May; 18:15	Hagen 7	(15–17)	Obaidli 11	Åsane Arena, Bergen; Attendance: 1,163; Referees: Borge, Nygren
22 May; 18:15	4× (suspension)	Report	1× (yellow card) 2× (suspension)	Åsane Arena, Bergen; Attendance: 1,163; Referees: Borge, Nygren

Storhamar won series, 2–0.

== Awards ==
=== All Star Team and other awards ===
The All Star Team and other awards were announced, beginning in May 2025.

Position	Player
Goalkeeper	(Norway) Eli Marie Raasok (Storhamar)
Left wing	(Norway) Camilla Herrem (Sola)
Left back	(Norway) Maja Furu Sæteren (Larvik)
Centre back	(Norway) Anniken Obaidli (Storhamar)
Right back	(Norway) Mathilde Rivas Toft (Storhamar)
Right wing	(Norway) Tiril Jørstad Palm (Gjerpen)
Pivot	(Norway) Anna Mortvedt (Fana)
Defense player	(Norway) Martha Barka (Sola)
Rookie	(Norway) Synne With (Sola)
MVP	(Norway) Anniken Obaidli (Storhamar)
Player of the year	(Norway) Henny Reistad ( (Denmark) Team Esbjerg)
Public favorite	(Norway) Guro Ramberg (Larvik)
Goal of the year	(Norway) Tiril Jørstad Palm (Gjerpen)
Save of the year	(Denmark) Julie Stokkendal Poulsen (Oppsal)
Top scorer	(Norway) Maja Furu Sæteren (Larvik) (192 goals)
Assist queen	(Norway) Janne Håvelsrud Eklo (Byåsen) (138 assists)

== Season statistics ==
=== Top goalscorers ===
As of 5 April 2025

Rank	Player	Club	Goals
1	(Norway) Maja Furu Sæteren	Larvik	192
2	(Norway) Martine Kårigstad Andersen	Fana	175
3	(Norway) Aurora Kjellevold Hatle	Byåsen	173
4	(Norway) Anniken Obaidli	Storhamar	165
5	(Norway) Malin Holta	Sola	159
6	(Norway) Maja Muri	Ravens	142
7	(Norway) Camilla Herrem	Sola	141
8	(Norway) Janne Håvelsrud Eklo	Byåsen	138
9	(Norway) Julie Bøe Jacobsen	Molde	135
10	(Denmark) Maja Eiberg	Fredrikstad	131

== Relegation play-off ==
To determine the last two available spots in REMA 1000-ligaen, play-off matches are played between the teams that ended 12th and 13th in REMA 1000-ligaen's regular season and the teams placed 2nd and 3rd in the first division.

=== Matches ===
23 April; 18:30	Ravens	33–24	Aker	Skedsmohallen, Lillestrøm; Attendance: 512; Referees: Røneid, Snersrud
23 April; 18:30	Norum 9	(15–14)	Fjellvang, Kamburce 6	Skedsmohallen, Lillestrøm; Attendance: 512; Referees: Røneid, Snersrud
23 April; 18:30	3× (suspension)	Report	1× (yellow card) 2× (suspension)	Skedsmohallen, Lillestrøm; Attendance: 512; Referees: Røneid, Snersrud

27 April; 17:00	Aker	34–35	Ravens	Ullern Flerbrukshall, Oslo; Attendance: 478; Referees: Aksdal, Holager
27 April; 17:00	Fjellvang 8	(17–19)	Kjølstad, Svensson 7	Ullern Flerbrukshall, Oslo; Attendance: 478; Referees: Aksdal, Holager
27 April; 17:00	4× (suspension)	Report	1× (suspension)	Ullern Flerbrukshall, Oslo; Attendance: 478; Referees: Aksdal, Holager

Ravens won series, 2–0.

23 April; 17:20	Haslum	25–28	Volda	Nadderud Arena, Bærum; Attendance: 338; Referees: Bjørheim, Sæthern
23 April; 17:20	Hanssen 6	(11–15)	Stensrud 9	Nadderud Arena, Bærum; Attendance: 338; Referees: Bjørheim, Sæthern
23 April; 17:20	1× (yellow card) 6× (suspension)	Report	1× (suspension)	Nadderud Arena, Bærum; Attendance: 338; Referees: Bjørheim, Sæthern

27 April; 17:30	Volda	26–27	Haslum	Volda Campus Sparebank1, Volda; Attendance: 893; Referees: Dasic, Husomanovic
27 April; 17:30	Van Stam 6	(11–9)	Hanssen 7	Volda Campus Sparebank1, Volda; Attendance: 893; Referees: Dasic, Husomanovic
27 April; 17:30	1× (yellow card) 6× (suspension)	Report	2× (yellow card) 2× (suspension)	Volda Campus Sparebank1, Volda; Attendance: 893; Referees: Dasic, Husomanovic

1 May; 18:00	Haslum	26–22	Volda	Nadderud Arena, Bærum; Attendance: 668; Referees: Fremstad, Jørstad
1 May; 18:00	Andresen 6	(13–12)	Stensrud 6	Nadderud Arena, Bærum; Attendance: 668; Referees: Fremstad, Jørstad
1 May; 18:00	2× (suspension)	Report	2× (suspension)	Nadderud Arena, Bærum; Attendance: 668; Referees: Fremstad, Jørstad

Haslum won series, 2–1.
