= 2025–26 REMA 1000-ligaen (women's handball) =

REMA 1000-ligaen
- Season: 2025–26
- Champions: Sola HK
- Relegated: Romerike Ravens; Haslum
- EHF Champions League: Storhamar HE; Sola HK
- EHF European League: Molde Elite; Larvik HK; Tertnes HE
- Top goalscorer: Martine Kårigstad Andersen (202 goals)
- Biggest home win: 22 goals: SOL 47–25 FIL
- Biggest away win: 24 goals: RAV 21–45 SOL
- Highest scoring: 75 goals: OPP 38–37 TER
- All statistics correct as of 31 May 2026.

The 2025–26 REMA 1000-ligaen was the 59th season of REMA 1000-ligaen, Norway's premier handball league.

== Teams ==
Locations of the 2025/26 REMA 1000-ligaen teams

=== Team changes ===
Promoted from First Division	Relegated from 2024–25 REMA 1000-ligaen
Fjellhammer IL	Vipers Kristiansand (Withdrawn)

=== Stadiums ===
Team	Location	Arena	Capacity
Byåsen HE	Trondheim	Kolstad Arena	2,500
Fana Håndball	Bergen	Fana Arena	1,206
Fjellhammer IL	Lørenskog	Fjellhamar Arena	1,700
Follo HK Damer	Ski	Stil Arena	2,500
Fredrikstad BK	Fredrikstad	Kongstenhallen	1,500
Gjerpen Håndball	Skien	Gjerpenhallen	300
Haslum Topphåndballforening	Bærum	Nadderud Arena	2,050
Larvik HK	Larvik	Jotron Arena Larvik	4,000
Molde Elite	Molde	Molde Arena	2,000
Oppsal Håndball	Oslo	Oppsal Arena	5,000
Romerike Ravens	Lillestrøm	Skedsmohallen	1,600
Sola HK	Sola	Åsenhallen	1,200
Storhamar HE	Hamar	Boligpartner Arena	1,650
Tertnes HE	Bergen	Åsane Arena	2,220

== Regular season ==
The teams placed 12th and 13th will have to play relegation playoff matches this season, against the teams placed 2nd and 3rd in the first division. The team placed 14th will be relegated to the first division.

=== Standings ===
Pos	Team	Pld	W	D	L	GF	GA	GD	Pts	Qualification or relegation
1	Sola	26	25	0	1	865	675	+190	50	Championship play-offs
2	Storhamar	26	22	1	3	808	630	+178	45	Championship play-offs
3	Molde	26	18	4	4	844	695	+149	40	Championship play-offs
4	Larvik	26	18	1	7	806	724	+82	37	Championship play-offs
5	Tertnes	26	14	2	10	786	730	+56	30	Championship play-offs
6	Fredrikstad	26	11	2	13	741	729	+12	24	Championship play-offs
7	Fana	26	11	2	13	742	727	+15	24	Championship play-offs
8	Gjerpen	26	11	1	14	707	698	+9	23	Championship play-offs
9	Byåsen	26	11	1	14	734	724	+10	23	
10	Follo	26	10	2	14	721	769	−48	22	
11	Oppsal	26	9	1	16	740	795	−55	19	
12	Fjellhammer	26	6	2	18	696	807	−111	14	Play-off against the 2nd and 3rd from First Division
13	Haslum	26	4	0	22	635	877	−242	8	Play-off against the 2nd and 3rd from First Division
14	Ravens	26	2	1	23	632	877	−245	5	Relegated to First Division

Updated to match(es) played on 22 April 2026. Source:
Rules for classification: 1.) Points in head-to-head matches amongst tied teams; 2.) Goal difference in head-to-head matches amongst tied teams; 3.) Goals scored in head-to-head matches among tied teams; 4.) Points in all matches; 5.) Goal difference in all matches.

=== Results ===
In the table below the home teams are listed on the left and the away teams along the top.

Home \ Away	BYÅ	FAN	FIL	FOL	FBK	GJE	HAS	LHK	MOL	OPP	RAV	SOL	STO	TER
Byåsen		26–29	33–21	40–25	29–21	25–26	37–23	25–31	28–36	36–28	32–26	18–27	26–27	31–32
Fana	24–29		26–28	31–33	25–19	32–23	32–23	36–34	25–28	33–27	37–22	27–35	26–35	22–22
Fjellhammer	28–29	22–33		22–28	17–35	25–32	34–25	23–31	33–38	26–30	25–25	28–34	22–31	28–36
Follo	27–29	30–32	23–32		29–28	20–21	34–26	26–31	20–39	28–25	31–27	23–26	27–31	23–32
Fredrikstad	30–34	31–22	27–26	27–27		29–26	35–19	31–33	30–30	37–26	40–28	25–28	19–34	26–23
Gjerpen	33–18	26–23	33–18	25–29	29–23		26–28	30–34	24–28	29–30	32–24	24–29	25–30	24–26
Haslum	28–27	24–33	31–41	27–40	25–31	27–31		22–20	24–39	24–34	32–26	22–40	12–30	22–41
Larvik	32–29	34–32	28–28	33–26	37–27	24–23	33–28		27–28	34–32	38–25	27–28	25–31	31–27
Molde	26–26	35–29	40–27	28–27	32–27	36–36	40–22	26–29		33–23	37–17	30–27	23–35	34–25
Oppsal	29–27	31–31	27–35	26–28	27–25	34–30	34–29	20–30	24–39		32–22	25–29	28–32	38–37
Ravens	20–25	22–34	25–33	25–34	24–32	21–27	27–26	30–41	22–39	29–28		21–45	26–34	32–39
Sola	38–33	34–27	47–25	45–27	36–29	34–22	36–24	33–29	30–26	29–28	34–28		32–29	30–26
Storhamar	29–19	30–18	25–22	26–26	33–26	27–22	38–21	27–31	31–27	33–26	32–17	27–29		33–28
Tertnes	28–23	24–23	35–27	35–30	30–31	24–28	38–21	31–29	27–27	30–28	38–21	25–30	27–38	

Updated to match(es) played on 22 April 2026. Source: NHF
Legend: Blue = home team win; Yellow = draw; Red = away team win.

== Championship play-offs ==
Best of three format is applied in all play-off stages, with the higher seeded team playing the first and third game (if necessary) at home. If a game ended with a draw after the regular time, it will proceed to two 5-minutes periods of extra time. If there is still a draw, another 2 × 5-minutes extra time will be played. If the scores are still level after two extra times, the winners are decided by a 7-meter shootout.

=== Bracket ===
Quarterfinals
1	Sola	32	34
8	Gjerpen	21	27
3	Molde	27	30	38
7	Fana	41	26	36
2	Storhamar	31	30
6	Fredrikstad	24	28
4	Larvik	30	36
5	Tertnes	25	27

Semifinals
1	Sola	39	29
3	Molde	27	28
2	Storhamar	32	30
4	Larvik	22	28

Final
1	Sola	29	29	23
2	Storhamar	31	26	28

=== Quarterfinals ===
29 April; 18:00	Sola	32–21	Gjerpen	Åsenhallen, Sola; Attendance: 472; Referees: Bjørheim, Sæthern
29 April; 18:00	Bak, Haugseng 5	(14–8)	Westersjø 5	Åsenhallen, Sola; Attendance: 472; Referees: Bjørheim, Sæthern
29 April; 18:00	1× (suspension)	Report	4× (suspension)	Åsenhallen, Sola; Attendance: 472; Referees: Bjørheim, Sæthern

3 May; 18:00	Gjerpen	27–34	Sola	Skienshallen, Skien; Attendance: 450; Referees: Hell, Spago
3 May; 18:00	Holt 8	(10–17)	Herrem 11	Skienshallen, Skien; Attendance: 450; Referees: Hell, Spago
3 May; 18:00	1× (yellow card) 3× (suspension)	Report	2× (suspension)	Skienshallen, Skien; Attendance: 450; Referees: Hell, Spago

Sola won series, 2–0.

29 April; 18:00	Larvik	30–25	Tertnes	Jotron Arena Larvik, Larvik; Attendance: 313; Referees: Dasic, Husomanovic
29 April; 18:00	Kurtović 8	(20–13)	Hagen 7	Jotron Arena Larvik, Larvik; Attendance: 313; Referees: Dasic, Husomanovic
29 April; 18:00	1× (yellow card) 3× (suspension)	Report	1× (yellow card) 2× (suspension)	Jotron Arena Larvik, Larvik; Attendance: 313; Referees: Dasic, Husomanovic

3 May; 18:00	Tertnes	27–36	Larvik	Åsane Arena, Bergen; Attendance: 102; Referees: Aksdal, Holager
3 May; 18:00	Hagen 9	(17–18)	Kurtović 8	Åsane Arena, Bergen; Attendance: 102; Referees: Aksdal, Holager
3 May; 18:00	1× (suspension)	Report	1× (yellow card) 3× (suspension)	Åsane Arena, Bergen; Attendance: 102; Referees: Aksdal, Holager

Larvik won series, 2–0.

29 April; 18:00	Storhamar	31–24	Fredrikstad	OBOS Arena, Hamar; Attendance: 597; Referees: Rahimizadeh, Syversen
29 April; 18:00	Obaidli 9	(15–12)	Solberg 5	OBOS Arena, Hamar; Attendance: 597; Referees: Rahimizadeh, Syversen
29 April; 18:00	1× (yellow card) 1× (suspension)	Report	1× (yellow card) 1× (suspension)	OBOS Arena, Hamar; Attendance: 597; Referees: Rahimizadeh, Syversen

4 May; 18:00	Fredrikstad	28–30	Storhamar	Installatøren Arena, Fredrikstad; Attendance: 912; Referees: Røneid, Snersrud
4 May; 18:00	Solberg 7	(9–14)	Brandenborg 6	Installatøren Arena, Fredrikstad; Attendance: 912; Referees: Røneid, Snersrud
4 May; 18:00	1× (suspension)	Report	1× (yellow card) 2× (suspension)	Installatøren Arena, Fredrikstad; Attendance: 912; Referees: Røneid, Snersrud

Storhamar won series, 2–0.

29 April; 19:00	Molde	27–41	Fana	Molde Arena, Molde; Attendance: 312; Referees: Dale, Skjold
29 April; 19:00	Muri 8	(15–17)	Andersen 9	Molde Arena, Molde; Attendance: 312; Referees: Dale, Skjold
29 April; 19:00	1× (yellow card) 3× (suspension)	Report	2× (suspension)	Molde Arena, Molde; Attendance: 312; Referees: Dale, Skjold

3 May; 17:00	Fana	26–30	Molde	Fana Arena, Bergen; Attendance: 407; Referees: Brataas, Pettersen
3 May; 17:00	Andersen 8	(9–17)	Muri 7	Fana Arena, Bergen; Attendance: 407; Referees: Brataas, Pettersen
3 May; 17:00	2× (suspension)	Report	1× (yellow card) 1× (suspension)	Fana Arena, Bergen; Attendance: 407; Referees: Brataas, Pettersen

7 May
19:00
Molde
38–36 (ET)
Fana
Rekneshallen, Molde
Attendance: 622
Referees: Dasic, Husomanovic
Dalen, Muri 8
(12–21)
Andersen 12
1× (suspension)
Report
1× (yellow card) 2× (suspension)

FT: 31–31 ET: 7–5

Molde won series, 2–1.

=== Semifinals ===
11 May; 18:15	Sola	39–27	Molde	Åsenhallen, Sola; Attendance: 603; Referees: Dale, Skjold
11 May; 18:15	Henriksen, Herrem 7	(19–16)	Muri 7	Åsenhallen, Sola; Attendance: 603; Referees: Dale, Skjold
11 May; 18:15	2× (suspension)	Report	1× (yellow card) 5× (suspension)	Åsenhallen, Sola; Attendance: 603; Referees: Dale, Skjold

14 May; 18:15	Molde	28–29	Sola	Molde Arena, Molde; Attendance: 1,100; Referees: Fjeldskår, Ganz-Fjellvang
14 May; 18:15	Dalen 6	(15–14)	Bak 7	Molde Arena, Molde; Attendance: 1,100; Referees: Fjeldskår, Ganz-Fjellvang
14 May; 18:15	2× (yellow card) 3× (suspension)	Report	1× (yellow card) 4× (suspension)	Molde Arena, Molde; Attendance: 1,100; Referees: Fjeldskår, Ganz-Fjellvang

Sola won series, 2–0

12 May; 18:15	Storhamar	32–22	Larvik	OBOS Arena, Hamar; Attendance: 659; Referees: Dasic, Husomanovic
12 May; 18:15	Obaidli 7	(19–13)	Sæteren 5	OBOS Arena, Hamar; Attendance: 659; Referees: Dasic, Husomanovic
12 May; 18:15	1× (yellow card) 4× (suspension)	Report	1× (yellow card) 1× (suspension)	OBOS Arena, Hamar; Attendance: 659; Referees: Dasic, Husomanovic

15 May; 20:15	Larvik	28–30	Storhamar	Bergslihallen, Larvik; Attendance: 508; Referees: Førsund, Hoxha
15 May; 20:15	Pedersen 8	(13–18)	Obaidli 10	Bergslihallen, Larvik; Attendance: 508; Referees: Førsund, Hoxha
15 May; 20:15	1× (yellow card) 3× (suspension)	Report	1× (yellow card) 3× (suspension)	Bergslihallen, Larvik; Attendance: 508; Referees: Førsund, Hoxha

Storhamar won series, 2–0

=== Finals ===
22 May; 18:15	Sola	29–31	Storhamar	Åsenhallen, Sola; Attendance: 708; Referees: Dasic, Husomanovic
22 May; 18:15	Andersen, Bak 5	(14–15)	Rivas Toft 10	Åsenhallen, Sola; Attendance: 708; Referees: Dasic, Husomanovic
22 May; 18:15	1× (yellow card) 1× (suspension)	Report	5× (suspension)	Åsenhallen, Sola; Attendance: 708; Referees: Dasic, Husomanovic

28 May; 18:15	Storhamar	26–29	Sola	OBOS Arena, Hamar; Attendance: 1,407; Referees: Fremstad, Jørstad
28 May; 18:15	Vatne 5	(11–16)	Grimsrud 7	OBOS Arena, Hamar; Attendance: 1,407; Referees: Fremstad, Jørstad
28 May; 18:15	1× (suspension)	Report	2× (suspension)	OBOS Arena, Hamar; Attendance: 1,407; Referees: Fremstad, Jørstad

31 May; 16:15	Sola	23–28	Storhamar	Åsenhallen, Sola; Attendance: 1,030; Referees: Fremstad, Jørstad
31 May; 16:15	Andersen 5	(12–16)	Obaidli 6	Åsenhallen, Sola; Attendance: 1,030; Referees: Fremstad, Jørstad
31 May; 16:15	1× (red card)	Report	1× (yellow card) 1× (suspension)	Åsenhallen, Sola; Attendance: 1,030; Referees: Fremstad, Jørstad

Storhamar won series, 2–1

== Awards ==
=== All Star Team and other awards ===
The All Star Team and other awards were announced, beginning in May 2026.

Position	Player
Goalkeeper	(Norway) Eli Marie Raasok (Storhamar)
Left wing	(Norway) Camilla Herrem (Sola)
Left back	(Norway) Martine Kårigstad Andersen (Fana)
Centre back	(Norway) Frida Brandbu Andersen (Sola)
Right back	(Norway) Sarah Deari Solheim (Fjellhammer)
Right wing	(Norway) Ida Kallhovd (Oppsal)
Pivot	(Norway) Maja Muri (Molde)
Defense player	(Norway) Martha Barka (Sola)
Rookie	(Norway) Stella Waagan Kruse (Tertnes)
MVP	(Norway) Frida Brandbu Andersen (Sola)
Player of the year	(Norway) Camilla Herrem (Sola)
Public favorite	(Norway) Selma Henriksen (Sola)
Goal of the year	(Norway) Eline Osland (Fana)
Save of the year	(Norway) Eli Marie Raasok (Storhamar)
Top scorer	(Norway) Martine Kårigstad Andersen (Fana) (202 goals)
Assist queen	(Norway) Maja Furu Sæteren (Larvik) (158 assists)
Referees of the year	(Norway) Andreas Borge and (Norway) Magnus Nygren

== Season statistics ==
=== Top goalscorers ===
As of 22 April 2026

Rank	Player	Club	Goals
1	(Norway) Martine Kårigstad Andersen	Fana	202
2	(Norway) Sarah Deari Solheim	Fjellhammer	200
3	(Norway) Maja Furu Sæteren	Larvik	178
4	(Norway) Kristin Loraas Eiriksson	Oppsal	176
5	(Norway) Marte Juuhl Svensson	Ravens	161
6	(Norway) Anniken Obaidli	Storhamar	156
7	(Denmark) Maja Eiberg	Fredrikstad	151
8	(Norway) Sofie Fosnæss Hanssen	Haslum	146
9	(Norway) Birgitte Karlsen Hagen	Tertnes	142
10	(Norway) Maja Muri	Molde	136

== Relegation play-off ==
To determine the last two available spots in REMA 1000-ligaen, play-off matches are played between the teams that ended 12th and 13th in REMA 1000-ligaen's regular season and the teams placed 2nd and 3rd in the first division.

=== Matches ===
3 May; 17:00	Haslum	24–28	Utleira	Nadderud Arena, Bærum; Attendance: 278; Referees: Rahimizadeh, Syversen
3 May; 17:00	Hanssen, Mehus 6	(14–15)	E. Olsen 8	Nadderud Arena, Bærum; Attendance: 278; Referees: Rahimizadeh, Syversen
3 May; 17:00	1× (yellow card) 1× (suspension)	Report	1× (suspension)	Nadderud Arena, Bærum; Attendance: 278; Referees: Rahimizadeh, Syversen

9 May; 18:00	Utleira	33–20	Haslum	Utleirahallen, Trondheim; Attendance: 460; Referees: Dale, Skjold
9 May; 18:00	S. Olsen 7	(16–7)	Moen 6	Utleirahallen, Trondheim; Attendance: 460; Referees: Dale, Skjold
9 May; 18:00	4× (suspension)	Report	2× (suspension)	Utleirahallen, Trondheim; Attendance: 460; Referees: Dale, Skjold

Utleira won series, 2–0.

3 May; 18:00	Fjellhammer	34–32	Aker	Fjellhamar Arena, Fjellhamar; Attendance: 701; Referees: Nagalingam, Syversen
3 May; 18:00	S. Solheim 16	(17–13)	Fjellvang 10	Fjellhamar Arena, Fjellhamar; Attendance: 701; Referees: Nagalingam, Syversen
3 May; 18:00	1× (yellow card) 5× (suspension)	Report	3× (suspension)	Fjellhamar Arena, Fjellhamar; Attendance: 701; Referees: Nagalingam, Syversen

6 May; 18:30	Aker	24–26	Fjellhammer	Ullern Flerbrukshall, Oslo; Attendance: 483; Referees: Aksdal, Holager
6 May; 18:30	Fjellvang, Lynghjem 5	(13–14)	S. Solheim 10	Ullern Flerbrukshall, Oslo; Attendance: 483; Referees: Aksdal, Holager
6 May; 18:30	6× (suspension)	Report	1× (suspension)	Ullern Flerbrukshall, Oslo; Attendance: 483; Referees: Aksdal, Holager

Fjellhammer won series, 2–0.
