= 2023–24 REMA 1000-ligaen (women's handball) =

REMA 1000-ligaen
- Season: 2023–24
- Champions: Vipers Kristiansand
- Relegated: Aker Topphåndball
- EHF Champions League: Vipers Kristiansand; Storhamar HE
- EHF European League: Sola HK; Larvik HK; Fredrikstad BK
- Top goalscorer: Maja Furu Sæteren (234 goals)
- Biggest home win: 21 goals: VIP 40–19 FBK
- Biggest away win: 25 goals: AKE 17–42 VIP
- Highest scoring: 79 goals: VIP 45–34 OPP
- All statistics correct as of 24 May 2024.

The 2023–24 REMA 1000-ligaen was the 57th season of REMA 1000-ligaen, Norway's premier handball league.

== Team information ==
A total of 14 teams will be participating in the 2023/24 edition of REMA 1000-ligaen. 11 teams were qualified directly from REMA 1000-ligaen 2022/23 season, and Follo HK Damer, Gjerpen HK Skien and Oppsal from First Division, was promoted to REMA 1000-ligaen.

Team	Town	Arena	Capacity	Clubs locations in Norway
Aker Topphåndball	Oslo	Ullern Flerbrukshall	250	Clubs locations in Norway
Byåsen Håndball Elite	Trondheim	Kolstad Arena	2,500	Clubs locations in Norway
Fana	Bergen	Fana Arena	1,206	Clubs locations in Norway
Follo HK Damer	Ski	Stil Arena	2,500	Clubs locations in Norway
Fredrikstad Bkl.	Fredrikstad	Kongstenhallen	1,500	Clubs locations in Norway
Gjerpen HK Skien	Skien	Gjerpenhallen	300	Clubs locations in Norway
Larvik	Larvik	Jotron Arena Larvik	4,000	Clubs locations in Norway
Molde Elite	Molde	Molde Arena	2,000	Clubs locations in Norway
Oppsal	Oslo	Oppsal Arena	5,000	Clubs locations in Norway
Romerike Ravens	Rælingen	Skedsmohallen	3,500	Clubs locations in Norway
Sola	Sola	Åsenhallen	1,200	Clubs locations in Norway
Storhamar Håndball Elite	Hamar	Boligpartner Arena	1,650	Clubs locations in Norway
Tertnes Håndball Elite	Bergen	Åsane Arena	2,220	Clubs locations in Norway
Vipers Kristiansand	Kristiansand	Aquarama	2,200	Clubs locations in Norway

== Regular season ==
The teams placed 12th and 13th will have to play relegation playoff matches this season, against the teams placed 2nd and 3rd in the First Division. The team placed 14th will be relegated to the First Division.

=== Standings ===
Pos	Team	Pld	W	D	L	GF	GA	GD	Pts	Qualification or relegation
1	Vipers	26	26	0	0	931	659	+272	52	Championship play-offs
2	Storhamar	26	23	0	3	851	635	+216	46	Championship play-offs
3	Sola	26	19	0	7	832	719	+113	38	Championship play-offs
4	Larvik	26	17	0	9	777	729	+48	34	Championship play-offs
5	Fredrikstad	26	15	1	10	739	777	−38	31	Championship play-offs
6	Oppsal	26	12	1	13	754	830	−76	25	Championship play-offs
7	Molde	26	12	0	14	730	787	−57	24	Championship play-offs
8	Gjerpen	26	11	1	14	681	708	−27	23	Championship play-offs
9	Tertnes	26	8	3	15	737	805	−68	19	
10	Byåsen	26	9	0	17	700	772	−72	18	
11	Fana	26	8	1	17	717	775	−58	17	
12	Ravens	26	7	1	18	717	776	−59	15	Play-off against the 2nd and 3rd from First Division
13	Follo	26	6	0	20	669	782	−113	12	Play-off against the 2nd and 3rd from First Division
14	Aker	26	5	0	21	654	735	−81	10	Relegated to First Division

Updated to match(es) played on 21 April 2024. Source:
Rules for classification: 1.) Points in head-to-head matches amongst tied teams; 2.) Goal difference in head-to-head matches amongst tied teams; 3.) Goals scored in head-to-head matches among tied teams; 4.) Points in all matches; 5.) Goal difference in all matches.

=== Results ===
In the table below the home teams are listed on the left and the away teams along the top.

Home \ Away	AKE	BYÅ	FAN	FOL	FBK	GJE	LHK	MOL	OPP	RAV	SOL	STO	TER	VIP
Aker Topphåndball		24–26	22–28	25–26	23–31	24–27	23–25	35–22	29–31	24–23	21–31	25–28	23–24	17–42
Byåsen HE	31–23		19–26	33–25	30–32	30–23	21–38	27–20	26–27	33–21	28–33	25–30	32–27	23–39
Fana	26–25	20–30		25–26	24–28	26–23	27–35	28–31	32–33	32–27	31–35	23–34	33–33	30–37
Follo HK Damer	26–23	26–29	32–31		25–28	24–25	25–29	30–32	30–28	24–29	20–34	21–33	24–33	27–36
Fredrikstad BK	21–34	33–26	28–25	33–20		26–26	26–32	30–25	29–25	30–28	29–35	23–39	35–32	29–38
Gjerpen HK Skien	23–20	38–27	28–29	28–21	34–26		24–28	22–26	37–19	20–38	24–32	17–30	28–26	20–36
Larvik HK	28–27	30–27	30–26	32–23	32–38	23–32		27–28	33–28	29–33	31–29	32–26	39–21	23–31
Molde Elite	34–26	33–27	27–31	25–23	27–26	29–27	24–26		33–34	28–30	35–37	22–29	32–35	25–41
Oppsal Håndball	34–30	37–32	27–26	33–32	29–32	25–23	33–34	32–33		29–25	22–35	22–35	34–29	30–35
Romerike Ravens	24–29	30–29	27–32	33–27	28–29	21–24	34–29	29–32	28–30		29–30	20–38	23–23	22–35
Sola HK	26–30	32–21	34–28	33–27	32–22	30–37	30–27	37–30	40–21	39–27		19–28	37–31	22–25
Storhamar HE	33–21	36–18	33–24	30–25	41–24	32–23	32–25	36–27	34–23	34–29	34–29		29–27	20–30
Tertnes HE	28–24	31–28	33–29	23–30	27–32	29–27	24–33	28–30	26–26	34–32	24–32	25–44		28–31
Vipers Kristiansand	37–27	38–22	38–25	39–30	40–19	31–21	37–27	34–20	45–34	33–27	37–29	28–26	38–36	

Updated to match(es) played on 21 April 2024. Source: NHF
Legend: Blue = home team win; Yellow = draw; Red = away team win.

== Championship play-offs ==
Best of three format is applied in all play-off stages, with the higher seeded team playing the first and third game (if necessary) at home. If a game ended with a draw after the regular time, it will proceed to two 5-minutes periods of extra time. If there is still a draw, another 2 × 5-minutes extra time will be played. If the scores are still level after two extra times, the winners are decided by a 7-meter shootout.

Top ranked teams from the regular season choose their opponents in the quarterfinal and semifinal stages. The remaining two highest ranked teams after the quarterfinal stage can not meet in the semifinals.

=== Bracket ===
Quarterfinals
1	Vipers Kristiansand	31	33
8	Gjerpen HK Skien	19	19
4	Larvik HK	35	27	28
7	Molde Elite	29	32	27
2	Storhamar Håndball Elite	29	39
6	Oppsal	28	27
3	Sola HK	30	37
5	Fredrikstad BK	24	21

Semifinals
1	Vipers Kristiansand	34	39
4	Larvik HK	27	25
2	Storhamar Håndball Elite	25	27	32
3	Sola HK	27	23	26

Finals
1	Vipers Kristiansand	37	32
2	Storhamar Håndball Elite	33	27

=== Quarterfinals ===
23 April; 17:30	Vipers Kristiansand	31–19	Gjerpen HK Skien	Aqurama, Kristiansand; Attendance: 731; Referees: Dale, Skjold
23 April; 17:30	Vyakhireva 6	(15–11)	Skrettingland 5	Aqurama, Kristiansand; Attendance: 731; Referees: Dale, Skjold
23 April; 17:30	2× (yellow card) 1× (suspension)	Report	1× (yellow card) 1× (suspension)	Aqurama, Kristiansand; Attendance: 731; Referees: Dale, Skjold

29 April; 19:00	Gjerpen HK Skien	19–33	Vipers Kristiansand	Skienshallen, Skien; Attendance: 743; Referees: Essajee, Olsen
29 April; 19:00	Høsøien 4	(11–15)	Vyakhireva 7	Skienshallen, Skien; Attendance: 743; Referees: Essajee, Olsen
29 April; 19:00	3× (yellow card)	Report	1× (yellow card)	Skienshallen, Skien; Attendance: 743; Referees: Essajee, Olsen

Vipers Kristiansand won series, 2–0.

24 April; 18:00	Storhamar Håndball Elite	29–28	Oppsal	Boligpartner Arena, Hamar; Attendance: 438; Referees: Holgar, Aksdal
24 April; 18:00	Nestaker 11	(14–15)	Svendsberget 6	Boligpartner Arena, Hamar; Attendance: 438; Referees: Holgar, Aksdal
24 April; 18:00	1× (yellow card) 2× (suspension)	Report	1× (yellow card) 3× (suspension)	Boligpartner Arena, Hamar; Attendance: 438; Referees: Holgar, Aksdal

28 April; 18:00	Oppsal	27–39	Storhamar Håndball Elite	Oppsal Arena, Oslo; Attendance: 460; Referees: Liltved, Haavi
28 April; 18:00	Lund, Porsmyr, Svendsberget 5	(13–20)	Nestaker 7	Oppsal Arena, Oslo; Attendance: 460; Referees: Liltved, Haavi
28 April; 18:00	1× (suspension)	Report	1× (yellow card) 1× (suspension)	Oppsal Arena, Oslo; Attendance: 460; Referees: Liltved, Haavi

Storhamar Håndball Elite won series, 2–0.

24 April; 18:00	Sola HK	30–24	Fredrikstad BK	Åsenhallen, Sola; Attendance: 469; Referees: Johannessen, Larsen
24 April; 18:00	Knutsen, Magnussen 5	(18–9)	Solberg 7	Åsenhallen, Sola; Attendance: 469; Referees: Johannessen, Larsen
24 April; 18:00	2× (suspension)	Report	3× (suspension)	Åsenhallen, Sola; Attendance: 469; Referees: Johannessen, Larsen

27 April; 29:00	Fredrikstad BK	21–34	Sola HK	Kongstenhallen, Fredrikstad; Attendance: 100; Referees: Fjeldskår, Fjellvang
27 April; 29:00	Nordrum 6	(11–17)	Herrem 13	Kongstenhallen, Fredrikstad; Attendance: 100; Referees: Fjeldskår, Fjellvang
27 April; 29:00	1× (yellow card) 1× (suspension)	Report	1× (yellow card) 2× (suspension)	Kongstenhallen, Fredrikstad; Attendance: 100; Referees: Fjeldskår, Fjellvang

Sola HK won series, 2–0.

24 April; 18:00	Larvik HK	35–29	Molde Elite	Jotron Arena Larvik, Larvik; Attendance: 336; Referees: Kalløkkebakken, Valbjør
24 April; 18:00	Sæteren 13	(18–13)	Sand 6	Jotron Arena Larvik, Larvik; Attendance: 336; Referees: Kalløkkebakken, Valbjør
24 April; 18:00	2× (yellow card) 2× (suspension)	Report	1× (yellow card) 2× (suspension)	Jotron Arena Larvik, Larvik; Attendance: 336; Referees: Kalløkkebakken, Valbjør

23 April; 17:15	Molde Elite	32–27	Larvik HK	Frænahallen, Elnesvågen; Attendance: 500; Referees: Johannessen, Larsen
23 April; 17:15	Alver 7	(16–15)	Sæteren 12	Frænahallen, Elnesvågen; Attendance: 500; Referees: Johannessen, Larsen
23 April; 17:15	2× (suspension)	Report	2× (suspension)	Frænahallen, Elnesvågen; Attendance: 500; Referees: Johannessen, Larsen

2 May; 18:15	Larvik HK	28–27	Molde Elite	Jotron Arena Larvik, Larvik; Attendance: 355; Referees: Nygren, Borge
2 May; 18:15	Sæteren 7	(15–16)	Obaidli 6	Jotron Arena Larvik, Larvik; Attendance: 355; Referees: Nygren, Borge
2 May; 18:15		Report	1× (suspension)	Jotron Arena Larvik, Larvik; Attendance: 355; Referees: Nygren, Borge

Larvik HK won series, 2–1.

=== Semifinals ===
8 May; 18:15	Vipers Kristiansand	34–25	Larvik HK	Aqurama, Kristiansand; Attendance: 1,003; Referees: Fjeldskår, Fjellvang
8 May; 18:15	Abbingh, Arcos 5	(20–10)	Sæteren 10	Aqurama, Kristiansand; Attendance: 1,003; Referees: Fjeldskår, Fjellvang
8 May; 18:15		Report	3× (suspension)	Aqurama, Kristiansand; Attendance: 1,003; Referees: Fjeldskår, Fjellvang

14 May; 18:15	Larvik HK	25–39	Vipers Kristiansand	Jotron Arena Larvik, Larvik; Attendance: 388; Referees: Dasic, Husomanovic
14 May; 18:15	Sæteren 7	(9–20)	Vyakhireva 8	Jotron Arena Larvik, Larvik; Attendance: 388; Referees: Dasic, Husomanovic
14 May; 18:15	1× (yellow card) 3× (suspension)	Report	3× (suspension)	Jotron Arena Larvik, Larvik; Attendance: 388; Referees: Dasic, Husomanovic

Vipers Kristiansand won series, 2–0.

7 May; 18:15	Storhamar Håndball Elite	25–27	Sola HK	Boligpartner Arena, Hamar; Attendance: 761; Referees: Jørum, Kleven
7 May; 18:15	Abdulla, Nestaker, Obaidli, Svele 4	(13–16)	Novak 10	Boligpartner Arena, Hamar; Attendance: 761; Referees: Jørum, Kleven
7 May; 18:15		Report	1× (suspension)	Boligpartner Arena, Hamar; Attendance: 761; Referees: Jørum, Kleven

15 May; 18:15	Sola HK	23–27	Storhamar Håndball Elite	Åsenhallen, Sola; Attendance: 1,035; Referees: Braseth, Sundet
15 May; 18:15	Tveiten 8	(12–12)	Venn 6	Åsenhallen, Sola; Attendance: 1,035; Referees: Braseth, Sundet
15 May; 18:15	3× (suspension)	Report	4× (suspension)	Åsenhallen, Sola; Attendance: 1,035; Referees: Braseth, Sundet

18 May; 18:15	Storhamar Håndball Elite	32–26	Sola HK	Boligpartner Arena, Hamar; Attendance: 857; Referees: Nygren, Borge
18 May; 18:15	Nestaker, Venn 8	(16–14)	Herrem 5	Boligpartner Arena, Hamar; Attendance: 857; Referees: Nygren, Borge
18 May; 18:15	5× (suspension) 1× (red card)	Report	1× (yellow card) 3× (suspension)	Boligpartner Arena, Hamar; Attendance: 857; Referees: Nygren, Borge

Storhamar Håndball Elite won series, 2–1.

=== Finals ===
21 May; 18:15	Vipers Kristiansand	37–33	Storhamar Håndball Elite	Aquarama, Kristiansand; Attendance: 892; Referees: Nygren, Borge
21 May; 18:15	Vyakhireva 10	(19–16)	Venn 8	Aquarama, Kristiansand; Attendance: 892; Referees: Nygren, Borge
21 May; 18:15	2× (suspension)	Report	1× (yellow card) 4× (suspension)	Aquarama, Kristiansand; Attendance: 892; Referees: Nygren, Borge

24 May; 18:15	Storhamar Håndball Elite	27–32	Vipers Kristiansand	Boligpartner Arena, Hamar; Attendance: 1,387; Referees: Braseth, Sundet
24 May; 18:15	Venn 7	(13–14)	Abbingh 9	Boligpartner Arena, Hamar; Attendance: 1,387; Referees: Braseth, Sundet
24 May; 18:15	2× (suspension)	Report	6× (suspension)	Boligpartner Arena, Hamar; Attendance: 1,387; Referees: Braseth, Sundet

Vipers Kristiansand won series, 2–0.

== Awards ==
=== All Star Team and other awards ===
The All Star Team and other awards were announced, beginning 10 May 2024.

Position	Player
Goalkeeper	(Norway) Eli Marie Raasok (Storhamar HE)
Left wing	(Norway) Camilla Herrem (Sola HK)
Left back	(Norway) Maja Furu Sæteren (Larvik HK)
Centre back	(Norway) Anniken Obaidli (Storhamar HE)
Right back	(Russia) Anna Vyakhireva (Vipers Kristiansand)
Right wing	(Norway) Tuva Høve (Vipers Kristiansand)
Pivot	(Norway) Maja Muri (Romerike Ravens)
Rookie	(Norway) Tiril Jørstad Palm (Gjerpen HK Skien)
Public favorite	(Norway) Tiril Jørstad Palm (Gjerpen HK Skien)
Defense player	(Norway) Martha Barka (Sola HK)
MVP	(Norway) Maja Furu Sæteren (Larvik HK)
Player of the year	(Norway) Henny Reistad ( (Denmark) Team Esbjerg)

== Season statistics ==
=== Top goalscorers ===
As of 21 April 2024

Rank	Player	Club	Goals
1	(Norway) Maja Furu Sæteren	Larvik HK	234
2	(Norway) Christine Karlsen Alver	Molde Elite	180
3	(Norway) Maja Muri	Romerike Ravens	160
4	(Norway) Karoline Lund	Oppsal Håndball	154
5	(Norway) Camilla Herrem	Sola HK	141
6	(Norway) Karoline Elise Syversen	Fredrikstad BK	134
7	(Norway) Anniken Obaidli	Storhamar HE	132
7	(Norway) Emma Holtet	Tertnes HE	132
7	(Norway) Henriette Espetvedt Eggen	Tertnes HE	132
10	(Norway) Julie Hulleberg	Fredrikstad BK	130

== Relegation play-off ==
To determine the last two available spots in REMA 1000-ligaen, play-off matches are played between the teams that ended 12th and 13th in REMA 1000-ligaen's regular season and the teams placed 2nd and 3rd in the First Division.

=== Matches ===
26 April; 19:00	Romerike Ravens	30–29	Flint Tønsberg	Skedsmohallen, Lillestrøm; Attendance: 298; Referees: Nygren, Borge
26 April; 19:00	Holstad 9	(13–14)	Mogstad 11	Skedsmohallen, Lillestrøm; Attendance: 298; Referees: Nygren, Borge
26 April; 19:00	1× (suspension)	Report	3× (suspension)	Skedsmohallen, Lillestrøm; Attendance: 298; Referees: Nygren, Borge

1 May; 17:00	Flint Tønsberg	25–29	Romerike Ravens	REMA 1000 Arena, Tønsberg; Attendance: 677; Referees: Liltved, Haavi
1 May; 17:00	Mogstad 7	(11–17)	Muri 10	REMA 1000 Arena, Tønsberg; Attendance: 677; Referees: Liltved, Haavi
1 May; 17:00	1× (yellow card) 1× (suspension)	Report	1× (suspension)	REMA 1000 Arena, Tønsberg; Attendance: 677; Referees: Liltved, Haavi

Romerike Ravens won series, 2–0.

28 April; 16:30	Follo HK Damer	26–19	Volda	Stil Arena, Langhus; Attendance: 297; Referees: Holager, Aksdal
28 April; 16:30	Sundfær 8	(12–12)	Guðmundsdóttir 8	Stil Arena, Langhus; Attendance: 297; Referees: Holager, Aksdal
28 April; 16:30	1× (yellow card) 3× (suspension)	Report	1× (yellow card) 2× (suspension)	Stil Arena, Langhus; Attendance: 297; Referees: Holager, Aksdal

1 May; 17:30	Volda	32–26	Follo HK Damer	Volda Campus Sparebank1 Arena, Volda; Attendance: 565; Referees: Kvakic, Eriksen
1 May; 17:30	Guðmundsdóttir, Nilsson 7	(15–13)	Alvestad 7	Volda Campus Sparebank1 Arena, Volda; Attendance: 565; Referees: Kvakic, Eriksen
1 May; 17:30	5× (suspension)	Report	6× (suspension)	Volda Campus Sparebank1 Arena, Volda; Attendance: 565; Referees: Kvakic, Eriksen

5 May; 16:00	Follo HK Damer	34–23	Volda	Stil Arena, Langhus; Attendance: 310; Referees: Dasic, Husomanovic
5 May; 16:00	Gjikokaj 7	(17–13)	Rye 5	Stil Arena, Langhus; Attendance: 310; Referees: Dasic, Husomanovic
5 May; 16:00	1× (yellow card) 1× (suspension)	Report	1× (suspension)	Stil Arena, Langhus; Attendance: 310; Referees: Dasic, Husomanovic

Follo HK Damer won series, 2–1.
