= June Krogh =

Norwegian handball player (born 2003)

Personal information
- Full name: June Cecilie Krogh
- Nationality: Norwegian
- Born: 2 December 2003 (age 22) Son, Norway
- Height: 1.85 m (6 ft 1 in)

Sport
- Sport: Handball
- Position: Goalkeeper
- Current club: Storhamar HE
- Number: 55

Youth career
- Years: Team
- –: Son HK

Senior clubs
- Years: Team
- –2020: Son HK
- 2020–2024: Follo HK Damer
- 2024–2026: Storhamar HE
- 2026–: SCM Râmnicu Vâlcea
National team
Years	Team	Apps	(Gls)
2025–	Norway	18	(0)
Medal record
World Championship
Gold medal – first place	2025 Germany/Netherlands
Junior World Championship
Gold medal – first place	2022 Slovenia
- Updated on 27 September 2026

June Krogh (born 2 December 2003) is a Norwegian handball player for Storhamar HE and the Norwegian national team.

== Career ==
Krogh started playing handball at her hometown club Son HK. Initially she was an outfield player and converted to being a goalkeeper. In 2020 she joined Follo HK, where she initially played for the second team. In January 2022 she signed a 3 year contract with the club.

For the 2024/25-season she joined top Norwegian team Storhamar HE. Here she won the 2024 and 2025 Norwegian Cup and the Norwegian Championship 2024/25.

From the 2026/27 season she will joined Romanian SCM Râmnicu Vâlcea on a contract until 2029.

== National team ==
Krogh played 9 matchces for the Norwegian junior team. With the team she won the 2022 IHF Women's U20 Handball World Championship and was included in the All Star Team for the tournament.

For the 2022 European Championship she was part of the initial Norway selection, but was not chosen for the final squad. She played her first match for the Norwegian national team on 6 March 2025 against Denmark. In November 2025, Krogh was selected to represent Norway at the 2025 World Women's Handball Championship. Here Norway won gold medals. Krogh was the youngest member of the Norwegian squad and acted mainly as a back-up during the tournament.

== Achievements ==
- World Championship:
  - Winner: 2025
- Junior World Championship:
  - Gold Medalist: 2022
- Norwegian League
  - Gold: 2024/2025
  - Silver: 2025/2026
- Norwegian Cup:
  - Winner: 2024, 2025

== Individual awards ==
- All-Star Goalkeeper of the 2022 Women's Junior World Handball Championship.
