= Rikke Øyerhamn =

Norwegian handball player (born 2000)

Personal information
- Full name: Rikke Larsen Øyerhamn
- Nationality: Norwegian
- Born: 23 August 2000 (age 26) Bergen, Norway
- Height: 1.76 m (5 ft 9 in)

Sport
- Sport: Handball
- Position: Left wing

Senior clubs
- Years: Team
- 2017–2018: Åsane Håndball
- 2018–2022: Tertnes HE
- 2022–2025: Molde Elite
National team
Years	Team	Apps	(Gls)
2022	Norway	5	(4)
Medal record
Junior European Championship
Bronze medal – third place	2019 Hungary

Rikke Larsen Øyerhamn (born 23 August 2000) is a former Norwegian handball player, who last played for Molde Elite in REMA 1000-ligaen.

She also represented Norway at the 2018 Women's Youth World Handball Championship, placing 11th.

She made her debut on the Norwegian national team on 21 April 2022, against North Macedonia.

== Achievements ==
- REMA 1000-ligaen
  - Bronze: 2018/19
