= Vikebø =

Vikebø can refer to:

- Hege Christin Vikebø (born 1978), Norwegian handball player
- Rossland, Norway, also known as "Vikebø", village in Vestland county, Norway
