= Frida Brandbu Andersen =

Norwegian handball player (born 2002)

Personal information
- Nationality: Norwegian
- Born: 27 September 2002 (age 24) Fredrikstad, Norway
- Height: 1.73 m (5 ft 8 in)

Sport
- Sport: Handball
- Position: Centre back
- Current club: Sola HK
- Number: 3

Youth career
- Years: Team
- –: Kråkerøy IL

Senior clubs
- Years: Team
- 2018–2025: Fredrikstad BK
- 2025–2027: Sola HK
- 2027–: Ikast Håndbold
National team
Years	Team	Apps	(Gls)
2026–	Norway	5	(9)
Medal record
Junior World Championship
Gold medal – first place	2022 Slovenia

Frida Brandbu Andersen (born 27 September 2002) is a Norwegian handball player for Sola HK and the Norwegian national team.

== Career ==
She also represented Norway at the 2021 European Women's U-19 Handball Championship, placing 9th.

In July 2022, Brandbu Andersen and the rest of the Norwegian junior handball team became World Champions after winning 31–29 against Hungary in the finale.

On 8 April 2026, Brandbu Andersen made her debut on the Norwegian national team against Romania, scoring four goals.

== Achievements ==
- Junior World Championship:
  - Gold Medalist: 2022
- Norwegian League:
  - Winner: 2025/26

== Individual awards ==
- All Star Centre Back of REMA 1000-ligaen: 2025/2026
- Most Valuable Player of REMA 1000-ligaen: 2025/2026
