= Wenche Halvorsen Stensrud =

Norwegian handball player (born 1954)

Personal information
- Nationality: Norwegian
- Born: April 26, 1954 (age 72) Fredrikstad

Sport
- Sport: Handball

Senior clubs
- Years: Team
- –: Skjeberg IF
National team
Years	Team	Apps	(Gls)
1975–1984	Norway	91	(211)

Wenche Halvorsen Stensrud (born 26 April 1954) is a Norwegian handball player. She played 91 matches and scored more than 200 goals for the Norwegian national team between 1975 and 1984. She participated at the 1982 World Women's Handball Championship, where the Norwegian team placed seventh.

Stensrud (then Halvorsen) was top scorer ("skytterdronning") in the Norwegian League in the 1982/83 season (153 goals) and the 1985/86 season (168 goals), playing for the club Skjeberg IF.

After her active career, Stensrud was member of the staff as video analyst for the Norwegian women's national handball team.

She was awarded the Håndballstatuetten trophy from the Norwegian Handball Federation in 2013.

== Personal life ==
Stensrud was born in Fredrikstad in 1954.
