= Annette Wirén Larsen =

Danish handball player (born 1991)

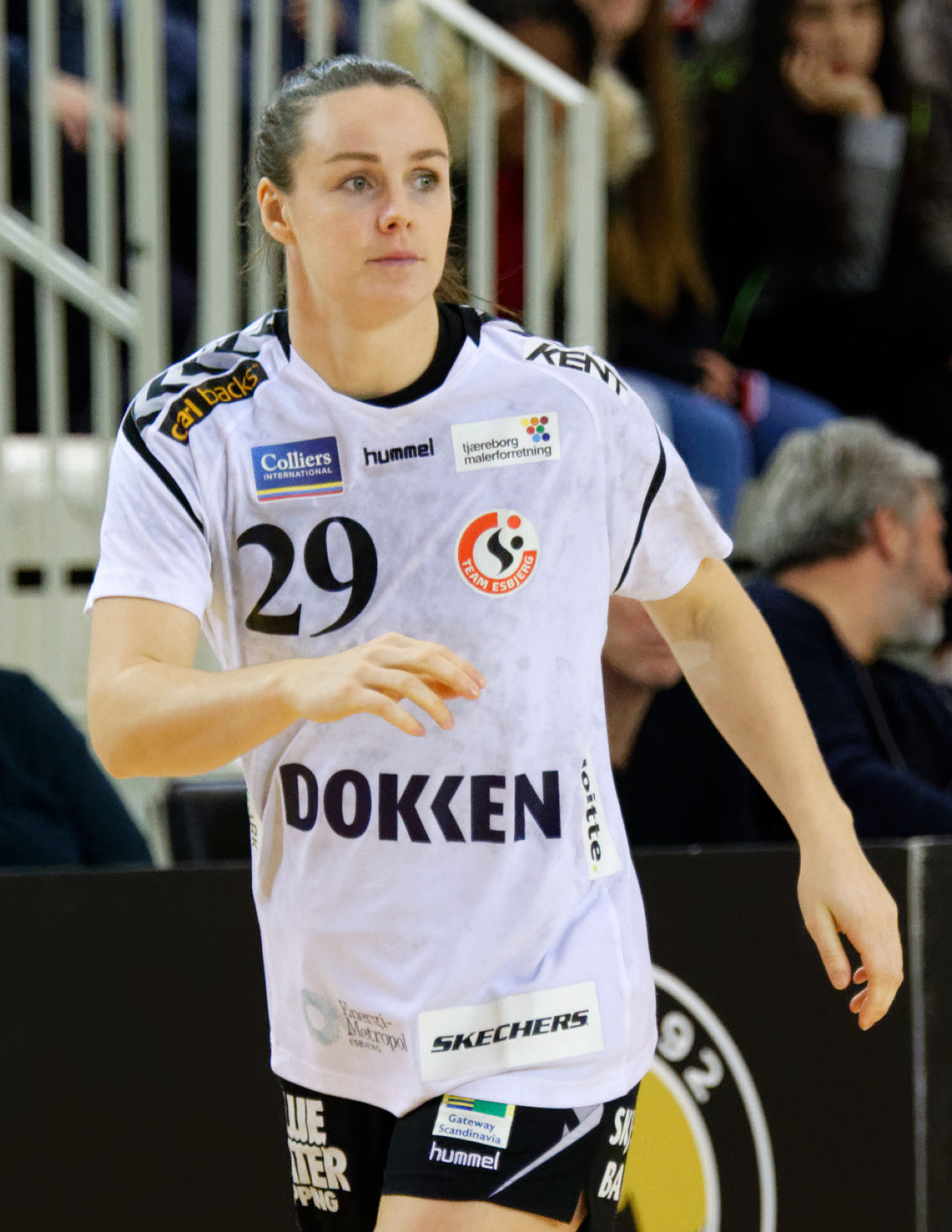

Personal information
- Full name: Annette Wirén Larsen
- Nationality: Danish
- Born: 24 September 1991 (age 35) Fredericia, Denmark
- Height: 1.76 m (5 ft 9 in)

Sport
- Sport: Handball
- Position: Centre Back
- Current club: HH Elite
- Number: 29

Senior clubs
- Years: Team
- 2009–2010: Fredericia HK
- 2010–2011: Horsens HK
- 2011–2012: Slagelse FH
- 2012–2015: Vipers Kristiansand
- 2015–2018: Team Tvis Holstebro
- 2018–2022: Team Esbjerg
- 2022–: Horsens HK
National team
Years	Team	Apps	(Gls)
2016–2019	Denmark	11	(10)

Annette Wirén Larsen (born 24 September 1991) is a Danish handball player for Horsens HK and the Danish national team.

She has also played for Fredericia HK, Team Esbjerg, Slagelse FH, Team Tvis Holstebro and Vipers Kristiansand in Norway.

She made her debut on the national team on 16 March 2017 against France.

== Achievements ==
- Danish Championship:
  - 3rd Place: 2016
- Women's EHF Cup Winners' Cup:
  - Winner: 2016

== Individual awards ==
- Topscorer of Eliteserien 2013/2014 (145 goals)
