= Amanda Kurtović =

Norwegian handball player (born 1991)

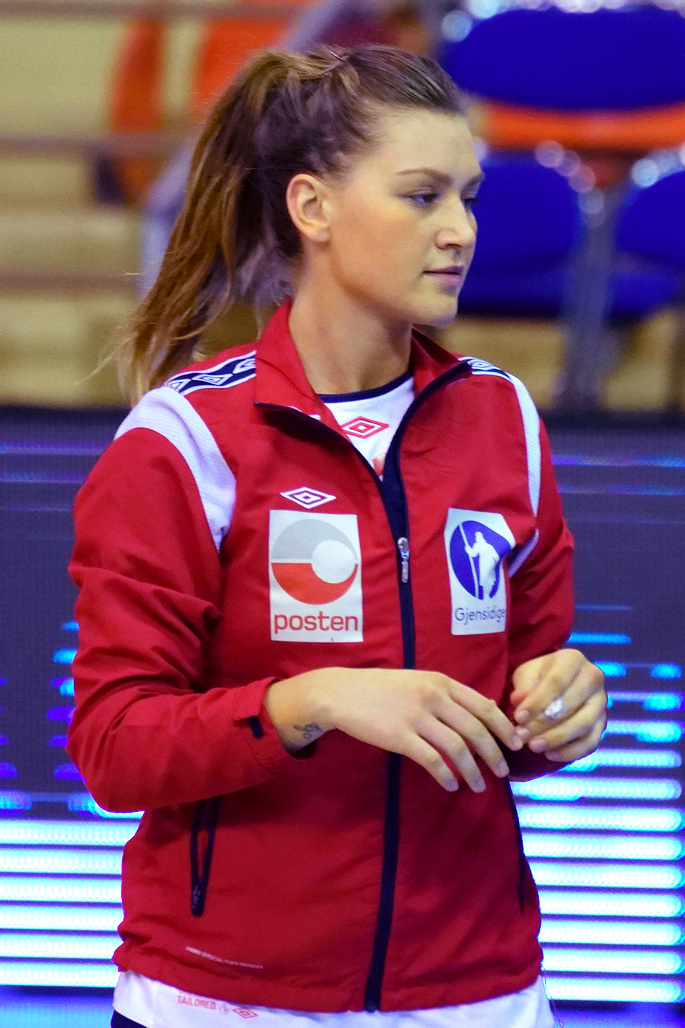

Personal information
- Full name: Amanda Maria Kurtović
- Nationality: Norwegian
- Born: 25 July 1991 (age 35) Karlskrona, Sweden
- Height: 1.75 m (5 ft 9 in)

Sport
- Sport: Handball
- Position: Right back
- Current club: Larvik HK
- Number: 24

Youth career
- Years: Team
- –: Sandefjord TIF

Senior clubs
- Years: Team
- 2007–2010: Nordstrand IF
- 2010: Byåsen HE
- 2011–2012: Larvik HK
- 2012–2014: Viborg HK
- 2014–2015: Oppsal
- 2015–2017: Larvik HK
- 2017–2019: CSM București
- 2019–2021: Győri Audi ETO KC
- 2021: → Kastamonu Belediyesi (loan)
- 2021–2022: HC Dunărea Brăila
- 2022–: Larvik HK
National team
Years	Team	Apps	(Gls)
2011–2020	Norway	118	(291)
Medal record
Olympic Games
Gold medal – first place	2012 London	Team
Bronze medal – third place	2016 Rio de Janeiro	Team
World Championship
Gold medal – first place	2011 Brazil
Gold medal – first place	2015 Denmark
Silver medal – second place	2017 Germany
European Championship
Gold medal – first place	2016 Sweden
Junior European Championship
Gold medal – first place	2009 Hungary

Amanda Kurtović (born 25 July 1991) is a Norwegian handball player who plays right back for Larvik HK and formerly the Norwegian national team. She has won medals at Olympic, World and European level.

== Career ==
=== Club career ===
Playing for Larvik HK, Kurtović won the Norwegian league and the Norwegian Women's Handball Cup in 2011, as well as winning the EHF Champions League, and also won the Norwegian league in 2012.

From 2012 to 2014 she played for the Danish club Viborg HK, and won the Women's EHF Cup Winners' Cup with Viborg in 2014.

She played for the club Oppsal Håndball from 2014 to 2015, and again for Larvik HK from 2015 to 2017, when Larvik won the Norwegian cup in 2015, both the cup and the league in 2016, and the league in 2017.

=== International career ===
Playing for the Norwegian national team, Kurtović became World champion in 2011, Olympic champion in 2012, World champion in 2015, and European champion in 2016. In 2016 she also won Olympic bronze medal with the Norwegian team. At the 2017 World Women's Handball Championship in Germany she won a silver medal with the Norwegian team.

Right before the European Championship, in November 2018, Kurtović raptured her ACL. After that she has only made three appearances, in 2020, for the national team, and since has not been called back.

== Achievements ==
- Olympic Games:
  - Winner: 2012
  - Bronze Medalist: 2016
- World Championship:
  - Winner: 2011, 2015
  - Silver Medalist: 2017
- European Championship
  - Winner: 2016
- EHF Champions League:
  - Winner: 2011
  - Bronze Medalist: 2018
- EHF Cup Winners' Cup
  - Winner: 2014
- Junior European Championship:
  - Winner: 2009
- REMA 1000-ligaen:
  - Bronze: 2024/2025
- Norwegian Cup:
  - Finalist: 2025

== Individual awards ==
- All-Star Team Right Wing of the Junior European Championship: 2009
- All-Star Right Back of Grundigligaen: 2016/2017
- Most Valuable Player of Grundigligaen: 2016/2017
- Prosport Best Right Back of the Romanian Liga Națională: 2018

== Personal life ==
She was born in Sweden to a Swedish mother and Croatian father, the handball coach and former player Marinko Kurtović. Her brother William is a professional footballer who represented Sweden internationally on youth level. Her family moved to Sandefjord, Norway, when she was six because her father signed a contract with the local club. In July 2023, Kurtović announced her first pregnancy with former hockey player Brede Csiszar.
