= Melanie Bak =

Danish handball player (born 1994)

Personal information
- Full name: Melanie Mie Bak
- Nationality: Danish
- Born: 30 January 1994 (age 32) Randers, Denmark
- Height: 1.72 m (5 ft 8 in)

Sport
- Sport: Handball
- Position: Left back
- Current club: Sola HK
- Number: 39

Youth career
- Years: Team
- 2009–2013: Randers HK

Senior clubs
- Years: Team
- 2013–2014: Randers HK
- 2014: RK Krim
- 2015: København Håndbold
- 2016: Union Mios Biganos-Bègles Handball
- 2016–2019: Gjerpen IF
- 2019: Brest Bretagne Handball
- 2019: Bourg-de-Péage Drôme Handball
- 2020: Randers HK
- 2020: Molde Elite
- 2021: Byåsen HE
- 2021–2023: SCM Craiova
- 2023–2025: HH Elite
- 2025–: Sola HK
National team
Years	Team	Apps	(Gls)
2018	Denmark	3	(6)

Melanie Mie Bak (born 30 January 1994) is a Danish handball player who plays for Sola HK and the Danish national team.

She made her debut on the Danish national team on 28 September 2018, against Norway in a friendly match.

== Achievements ==
- Slovenian Championship
  - Winner: 2014
- Slovenian Cup
  - Winner: 2014
- Norwegian League:
  - Winner: 2025/26

== Individual awards ==
- Topscorer of Eliteserien: 2017/2018 (143 goals)
