= Kari-Anne Henriksen =

Norwegian handball player (born 1980)

Personal information
- Nationality: Norwegian
- Born: April 22, 1980 (age 46) Bergen, Norway
- Height: 174 cm (69 in)

Sport
- Sport: Handball
- Position: Centre back

Senior clubs
- Years: Team
- 1997-2005: Tertnes HE
- 2005-2009: Ikast-Bording EH
- 2009-2010: Rællingen HK
- 2010-2013: Oppsal IF
National team
Years	Team	Apps	(Gls)
2001–2002	Norway	12	(17)
Medal record
European Championship
Silver medal – second place	2002 Denmark

Kari-Anne Tønder Henriksen (born 22 April 1980) is a Norwegian team handball player.

She made her debut on the Norway women's national handball team in 2001, and played 12 matches for the national team. She received a silver medal at the European Championship in 2002.
