= Stella Waagan Kruse =

Norwegian handball player (born 2005)

Personal information
- Nationality: Norwegian
- Born: 7 May 2005 (age 21) Oslo, Norway
- Height: 1.70 m (5 ft 7 in)

Sport
- Sport: Handball
- Position: Left wing
- Current club: Tertnes HE
- Number: 8

Youth career
- Years: Team
- –: Ullern IF

Senior clubs
- Years: Team
- 2021–2025: Aker Topphåndball
- 2025–: Tertnes HE
National team
Years	Team	Apps	(Gls)
2026–	Norway	5	(7)

Stella Waagan Kruse (born 7 May 2005) is a Norwegian handball player for Tertnes HE and the Norwegian national team.

== Career ==
On 8 April 2026, Kruse made her debut on the Norwegian national team against Romania, scoring two goals.

She also represented Norway at the 2024 Women's Junior World Handball Championship, placing 10th.

== Individual awards ==
- Best Rookie of REMA 1000-ligaen: 2025/2026
