= Frida Nåmo Rønning =

Norwegian handball player (born 1997)

Frida Rønning
Personal information
- Full name: Frida Nåmo Rønning
- Nationality: Norwegian
- Born: 3 February 1997 (age 29) Oslo, Norway
- Height: 1.65 m (5 ft 5 in)

Sport
- Sport: Handball
- Position: Centre back
- Current club: Borussia Dortmund Handball
- Number: 30

Senior clubs
- Years: Team
- 2013–2021: Oppsal
- 2021–2024: Borussia Dortmund Handball

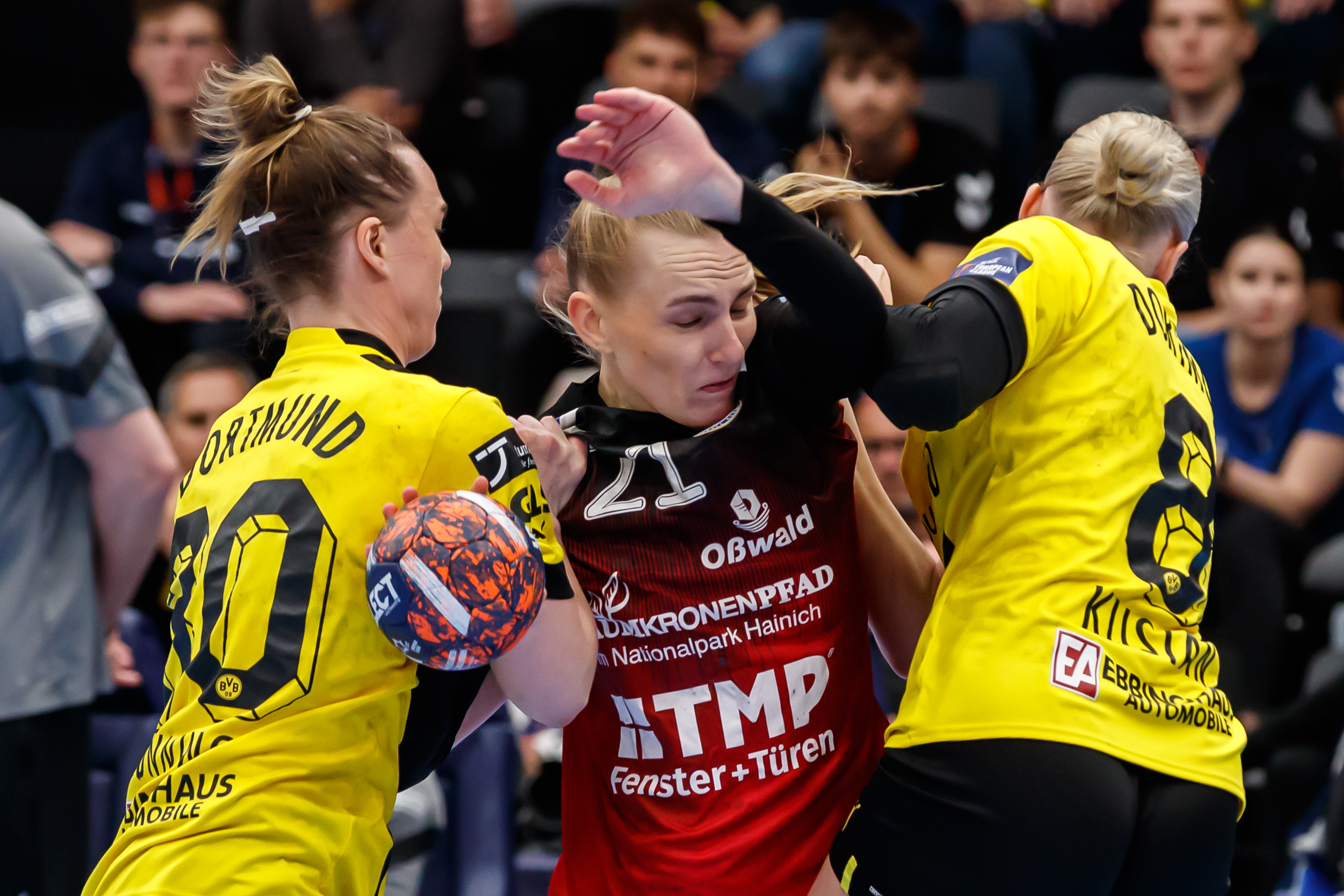
Rønning (left, Jersey number 30)

Frida Nåmo Rønning (born 3 February 1997) is a Norwegian handball player who last played for Borussia Dortmund Handball.

== Handball career ==
Frida Nåmo Rønning started playing handball at the age of six in her native town with Oppsal. A few days after her 16th birthday, she signed a contract with the women's team playing in Norway's top division of Oppsal IF. After Rønning suffered a cruciate ligament injury in August 2015, she had to stop playing for a time. Rønning later won a gold medal in 2017 with Oppsal's junior team. In the match playing for that gold medal against Sola HK she scored four goals. After another lengthy break from playing due to injury, she returned to Oppsal's top-flight squad for the 2018/19 season. In the summer of 2021, she joined Borussia Dortmund Handball.

Rønning played 26 caps for the Norwegian youth national team and 15 caps for the Norwegian junior national team. With these national teams she took part in the 2014 Women's Youth World Handball Championship in Macedonia and the 2015 Women's U-19 European Handball Championship in Spain.
