= Caroline Martins =

Brazilian handball player (born 1992)

Personal information
- Full name: Caroline Aparecida Nogueira Martins
- Nationality: Brazilian/Portuguese
- Born: 21 January 1992 (age 34) São Paulo, Brazil
- Height: 1.83 m (6 ft 0 in)

Sport
- Sport: Handball
- Position: Goalkeeper
- Current club: BSV Sachsen Zwickau
- Number: 1

Senior clubs
- Years: Team
- 2016–2017: CS Dinamo Bucuresti
- 2017–2018: Molde Elite
- 2019: Saint-Amand Handball
- 2019–2020: Molde Elite
- 2020–2021: Rælingen HK
- 2021–2023: Fredrikstad BK
- 2023–2024: BSV Sachsen Zwickau
- 2024–2025: Mosonmagyaróvári KC SE
- 2025–: MKS Lublin
National team
Years	Team	Apps	(Gls)
–	Brazil	2	(0)
Medal record
South and Central American Championship
Gold medal – first place	2021 Paraguay
Youth Olympic Games
Bronze medal – third place	Singapore 2010	Team
- Updated on 9 September 2024

Caroline Aparecida Nogueira Martins (born 21 January 1992) is a Brazilian handball player who plays for MKS Lublin.
