= Haslum Topphåndballforening =

Norwegian handball club

- Short name: Haslum
- Founded: 1 May 1999; 27 years ago (as Haslum HK)
- Arena: Nadderud Arena, Bærum
- Capacity: 2,050
- President: Tom-Eirik Skarpsno
- Head coach: Markus Svensson Selnak Rossavik
- League: Rema 1000-Ligaen
- 2025–26: 13th
- Club colours

Haslum Topphåndballforening (also known as Haslum HK Damer) is the women's handball team based in Haslum, Bærum. The team plays in REMA 1000-ligaen, the top division in the country, since its promotion in 2024.

Since 2021 the women's elite handball team was renamed Haslum HK Damer from the previous club name Bærum Topphåndball.

== Team ==
=== Current squad ===
Squad for the 2024–25 season

Goalkeepers

- 1 (Norway) Thea Granlund
- 12 (Norway) Erika Madeleine Arntsen Bjørløw
- 16 (Norway) Alva Bjanes Iversen
- 50 (Norway) Vilde Marsteinstredet

Wingers

- 11 (Norway) Sofie Fosnæss Hanssen
- 14 (Norway) Anette Sundal
- 18 (Norway) Anniken Løvaas
- 20 (Norway) Kristina Othilie Hetland Schennum
- 27 (Norway) Kristiane Strand Mylius
- 75 (Norway) Nicoline Jullumstrø

Line players

- 7 (Norway) Tuva Pharo
- 10 (Norway) Live Sønstebø
- 17 (Norway) Eira Pisani Danielsen
- 22 (Norway) Johanne Hovde Helgesen
- 23 (Norway) Tilde Amalia Grönvall
- 26 (Norway) Ingrid Louise Bjørnskau Berens

Back players

- 2 (Norway) Signe Dahl-Solheim
- 3 (Norway) Ragnhild Rise Kirkeby
- 4 (Norway) Siri Elicabeth Hansson
- 5 (Norway) Nora Asbjørnsen
- 6 (Norway) Veslemøy Marie Mehus
- 9 (Norway) Tilde Wilhelmsen Grønvold
- 15 (Norway) Andrea Holmsveen Moen
- 19 (Norway) Guro Skålevåg
- 21 (Norway) Thea Andresen
- 24 (Norway) Veriana Veliqi
- 28 (Norway) Hanna Borge
- 31 (Norway) Helena Bråthen Tellefsen

=== 2025-2026 Transfers ===
Joining

- (Norway) Andrea Nalbant Moe (LB) (from (Norway) Glassverket IF)
- (Norway) Oda Gjeisklid (P) (from (Norway) Oppsal Håndball)

Leaving

- (Norway) Thea Andresen (CB) (to (Norway) Fredrikstad BK)
- (Norway) Live Sønstebø (P) (to (Norway) Byåsen HE)

=== Technical staff ===
- Head coach: Markus Svensson Selnak Rossavik
- Assistant coach: Olai Jensen Vangen
