= Julie Stokkendal Poulsen =

Danish handball player

Personal information
- Full name: Julie Stokkendal Poulsen
- Nationality: Danish
- Born: 6 June 2001 (age 25) Viborg, Denmark
- Height: 1.80 m (5 ft 11 in)

Sport
- Sport: Handball
- Position: Goalkeeper
- Current club: Vipers Kristiansand
- Number: 12

Youth career
- Years: Team
- –: Viborg HK

Senior clubs
- Years: Team
- 2017–2020: Viborg HK
- 2020–2022: Bjerringbro FH
- 2022–2024: Vipers Kristiansand
- 2024–: Oppsal Håndball

Julie Stokkendal Poulsen (born 6 June 2001) is a Danish professional handballer for Oppsal Håndball. In her time at Vipers Kristiansand they won 7 titles including the EHF Women's Champions League in 2023.

== Achievements ==
- EHF Champions League:
  - Winner: 2022/2023
- Norwegian League:
  - Winner: 2022/2023, 2023/2024
- Norwegian Cup:
  - Winner: 2022/2023, 2023/2024
