= Hege Christin Vikebø =

Norwegian handball player (born 1978)

Personal information
- Nationality: Norwegian
- Born: 15 June 1978 (age 48)
- Height: 177 cm (70 in)

Sport
- Sport: Handball
- Position: Pivot

Senior clubs
- Years: Team
- 1998–2011: Tertnes HE
National team
Years	Team	Apps	(Gls)
1999–2006	Norway	22	(19)

Teams managed
- 2012–2015: TIF Viking

Hege Christin Vikebø (born 15 June 1978) is a Norwegian team handball player.

Vikebø made her debut on the national team in 1999, against Netherlands. She played 22 matches and scored 19 goals for the national team up to her latest representation in 2006. She played for the national team at the 2000 European Women's Handball Championship in Romania, when Norway finished 6th.

She played her entire career for Tertnes HE. In 2015 she made a short comeback for the rest of the 2014-15 season.

After her playing career she was the head coach of TIF Viking in the Norwegian second tier.
