= Karoline Lund =

Norwegian handballer (born 1999)

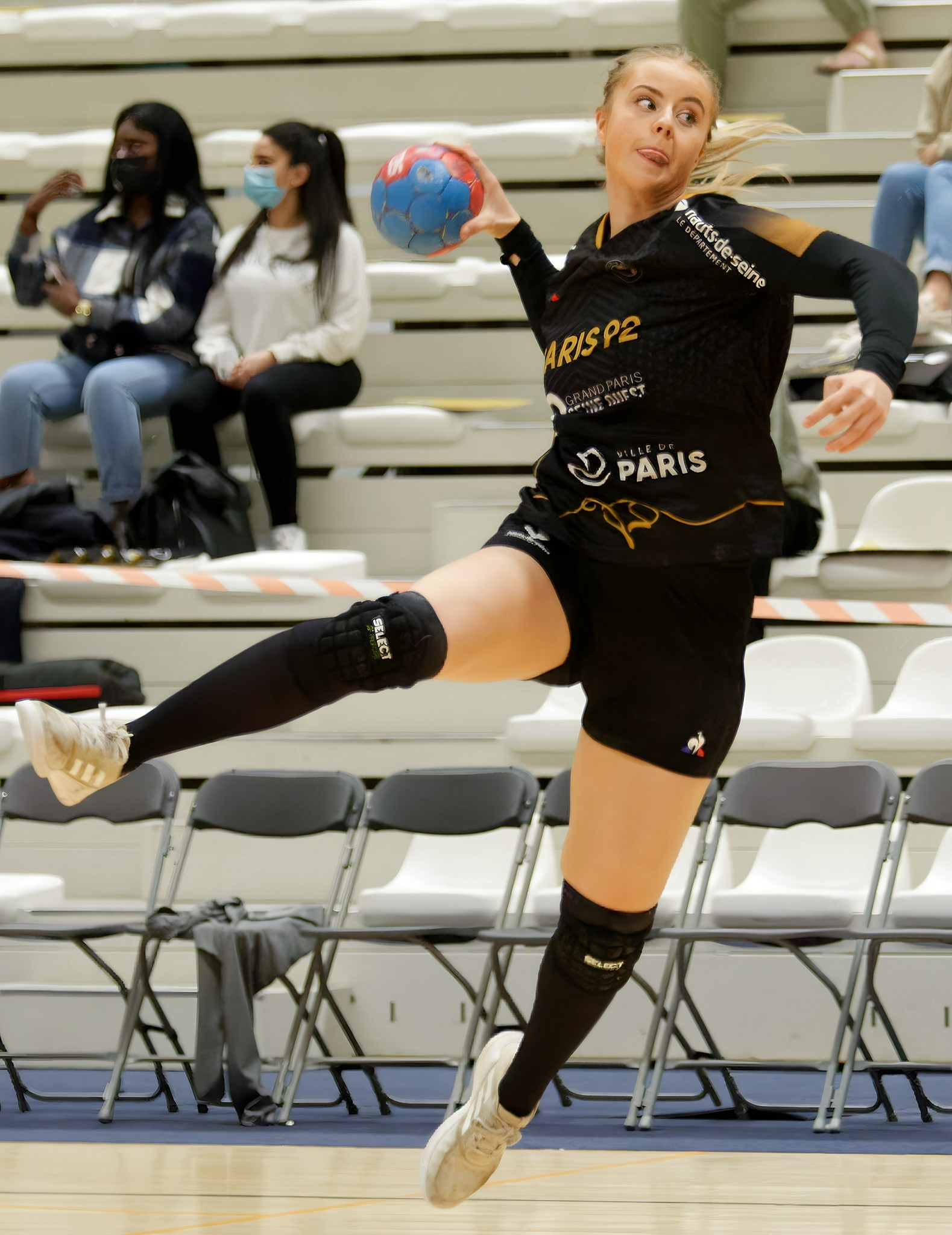
- Karoline Lund (2021)

Personal information
- Nationality: Norwegian
- Born: 31 May 1999 (age 27) Oslo, Norway
- Height: 1.82 m (6 ft 0 in)

Sport
- Sport: Handball
- Position: Left back
- Current club: SCM Râmnicu Vâlcea
- Number: 8

Youth career
- Years: Team
- 2005–2013: Rælingen HK

Senior clubs
- Years: Team
- 2014–2015: Fjellhammer IL
- 2015–2017: Rælingen HK
- 2017–2018: Aker Topphåndball
- 2018–2019: Larvik HK
- 2019–2021: Aker Topphåndball
- 2021: → Paris 92 (loan)
- 2021–2023: København Håndbold
- 2023–2025: Oppsal Håndball
- 2025–: SCM Râmnicu Vâlcea
Medal record
Junior World Championship
Silver medal – second place	2018 Hungary

Karoline Lund (born 31 May 1999) is a Norwegian female handballer who plays for SCM Râmnicu Vâlcea.

She also represented Norway in the 2017 Women's Junior European Handball Championship, placing 7th, and in the 2016 Women's Youth World Handball Championship, placing 4th.

In February 2021, Lund signed a 3-year contract with København Håndbold.

== Achievements ==
- Junior World Championship:
  - Silver Medalist: 2018
