= Annika Fríðheim Petersen =

Faroese handball player (born 1999)

Personal information
- Full name: Annika Fríðheim Petersen
- Nationality: Faroese
- Born: 1 June 1999 (age 27) Hoyvík, Faroe Islands
- Height: 1.79 m (5 ft 10 in)

Sport
- Sport: Handball
- Position: Goalkeeper
- Current club: EH Aalborg
- Number: 1

Senior clubs
- Years: Team
- –2020: H71
- 2020–2022: Haukar Handball
- 2022–2023: Nykøbing Falster Håndboldklub
- 2023–2024: Follo HK Damer
- 2024–: EH Aalborg
National team
Years	Team	Apps	(Gls)
2019–	Faroe Islands	32	(1)

Annika Fríðheim Petersen (born 1 June 1999) is a Faroese handballer who plays for Danish club EH Aalborg in the Danish Women's Handball League and the Faroe Islands women's national team.

== Career ==
Fríðheim Petersen started her career at H71, where she won the 2019-2020 Feroese Cup. In 2020 she joined Icelandic team Haukar Handball.

In February 2022, she joined Danish side Nykøbing Falster Håndboldklub. She made her debut on the senior team of NFH, on 13 February 2022. It was announced that she had signed a 3-year contract with the club, until the summer of 2024.

In 2023 she joined Norwegian side Follo HK. After a season in Norway, he returned to Denmark at joined the newly promoted EH Aalborg.

=== National team ===
Fríðheim Petersen made her debut on the Faroese national team on 2 October 2019, against Romania and has been appearing for the team during the 2022 European Women's Handball Championship qualification cycle. Her first major international tournament was the 2024 European Women's Handball Championship, which was also the first ever major international tournament for Faroes Islands ever. She played all three matches. At the 2025 World Championship she was part of the Faroe Islands team that played for the first time at a World Championship. With wins over Spain and Paraguay they advanced from the preliminary groups and recorded their first ever win at a major international tournament.
