= Olivia Löfqvist =

Swedish handball player (born 1998)

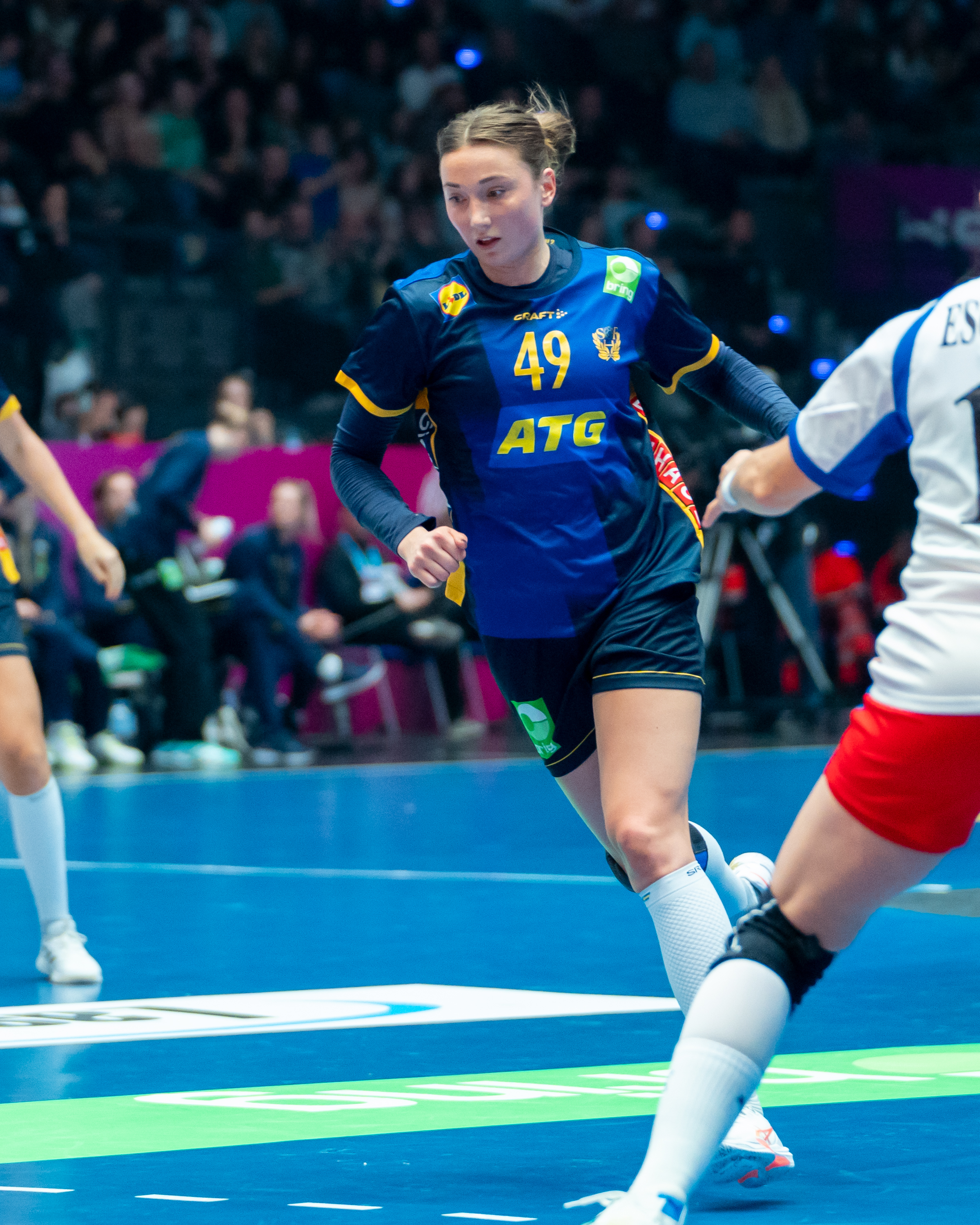

Personal information
- Full name: Olivia Linnéa Josephine Löfqvist
- Nationality: Swedish
- Born: 13 July 1998 (age 28) Hörby, Sweden
- Height: 1.77 m (5 ft 10 in)

Sport
- Sport: Handball
- Position: Pivot
- Current club: Team Esbjerg
- Number: 18

Senior clubs
- Years: Team
- –2013: IK Lågan
- 2013–2015: IK Pandora
- 2015–2022: Lugi HF
- 2022–2025: Storhamar HE
- 2025–: Team Esbjerg
National team
Years	Team	Apps	(Gls)
2023–	Sweden	44	(50)

Olivia Löfqvist (born 13 July 1998) is a Swedish handball player for Team Esbjerg and the Swedish national team.

On 3 March 2023, Löfqvist made her debut on the national team.

== Achievements ==
- EHF European League:
  - Winner: 2023/2024
- Norwegian League:
  - Gold Medalist: 2024/2025
  - Silver Medalist: 2022/2023, 2023/2024
- Norwegian Cup:
  - Winner: 2024
  - Finalist: 2023/2024
- Danish Championship:
  - Winner: 2026
