= Birgitte Karlsen Hagen =

Norwegian handball player (born 1994)

Personal information
- Nationality: Norwegian
- Born: 19 April 1994 (age 32) Bergen, Norway
- Height: 1.74 m (5 ft 9 in)

Sport
- Sport: Handball
- Position: Left back
- Current club: Tertnes HE
- Number: 2

Senior clubs
- Years: Team
- –2012: Fana
- 2012–2017: Tertnes HE
- 2017–2018: Silkeborg-Voel KFUM
- 2019–: Tertnes HE

Birgitte Karlsen Hagen (born 19 April 1994) is a Norwegian handball player who plays for Tertnes HE.

She also represented Norway in the 2013 Women's Junior European Handball Championship, placing 4th, and in the 2014 Women's Junior World Handball Championship, placing 9th.
