= Oppsal Håndball =

Norwegian handball club

- Full name: Oppsal Håndball
- Short name: Oppsal
- Founded: 4 August 1912; 114 years ago
- Arena: Oppsal Arena
- Capacity: 5,000
- Head coach: Henrik Wilhelmsen
- League: REMA 1000-ligaen
- 2025–26: 11th
- Club colours

Oppsal Håndball is the women's handball team of the Norwegian multi-sports club Oppsal IF based in Oslo, Norway.

In the 1970's the men's team won the Norwegian Championship five times, but now they play in the lower leagues, while the women's team is the flagship. After 10 consecutive seasons on the highest level in Norway, the team faced relegation after the 2021–22 season. The following season the team ended 3rd in 1. divisjon, which gave access to play-off matches against the 12th ranked team in REMA 1000-ligaen. This was possible due to restructuring of the series system. Oppsal won the best of three series against Volda Handball, and gained promotion to REMA 1000-ligaen.

== Team ==
=== Current squad ===
Squad for the 2026–27 season

Goalkeeper

- 12 (Norway) Hedda Holm Midthus
- 16 (Norway) Oda Therese Austad Henriksen
- 30 (Norway) Maja Linnea Gulliksen

Wingers
RW

- 18 (Norway) Marie Elde Selvaag
- 27 (Norway) Vanessa Gulbrandsen

LW

- 11 (Norway) Nora Løken (c)
- 24 (Norway) Marthine Svendsberget
- 28 (Norway) Silje Leikfoss Solbakken

Line players

- 4 (Norway) Oda Gjeisklid
- 14 (Norway) Aleksandra Mandic
- 35 (Norway) Maja Leinan

Back players
LB

- 2 (Norway) Martine Skudvig Mork
- 3 (Norway) Hanna Hernes Gåsvær
- 6 (Norway) Mali Halldorsson
- 6 (Norway) Andrea Nalbant Moe
- 7 (Norway) Emily Andersen
- 17 (Norway) Fredrikke Sundsby Kjølstad
- 25 (Norway) Erika Nodland Meiland

CB
RB

- 9 (Norway) Thea Ellen Löfstedt
- 21 (Norway) Mille Brekken Daae
- 22 (Norway) Veriana Veliqi

=== Transfers ===
Transfers for the 2026–27 season.

Joining

- (Norway) Mats Julius Haakenstad (Head coach)
- (Norway) Oda Therese Austad Henriksen (GK) (from (Norway) Glassverket IF)
- (Norway) Hedda Holm Midthus (GK) (from own rows)
- (Norway) Fredrikke Sundsby Kjølstad (LB) (from (Norway) Romerike Ravens)
- (Norway) Andrea Nalbant Moe (LB) (Norway) Haslum)
- (Norway) Thea Ellen Löfstedt (RB) (from own rows)
- (Norway) Veriana Veliqi (RB) (from (Norway) Haslum)
- (Norway) Marie Elde Selvaag (RW) (Norway) Ravens)

Leaving

- (Norway) Henrik Wilhelmsen (Head coach)
- (Norway) Vilde Tornes Finneide (GK) (to (Norway) Fredrikstad BK)
- (Norway) Kristin Loraas Eiriksson (LB) (to (Norway) Molde Elite)
- (Norway) Mille Tveit Porsmyr (CB) (to (Romania) Minaur Baia Mare)
- (Norway) Ida Kallhovd (RW) (to (Romania) SCM Craiova)

=== Technical staff ===
- Head coach: Mats Haakenstad
- Assistant coach: Vigdis Holmeset
- Assistant coach: Linn Jørum Sulland

=== Notable former national team players ===
- (Norway) Kari-Anne Henriksen
- (Norway) Amanda Kurtović (2014–2015)
- (Norway) Vilde Ingstad (2014–2016)
- (Norway) Malin Aune (2014–2017)
- (Norway) Anne Kjersti Suvdal (2014–2017)
- (Norway) Guro Nestaker (2016–2018)
- (Norway) Rikke Granlund (2017–2018)
- (Norway) Eli Marie Raasok (2014–2015, 2017–2020)
- (Norway) Linn Jørum Sulland (2022–2025)

=== Notable former club players ===
- (Norway) Marie Tømmerbakke
- (Norway) Malene Solheim
- (Norway) Jenny Handal Sneve
- (Norway) Mathilde Rivas Toft
- (Norway) Marthe Sønsthagen Johansen
- (Norway) June Bøttger
- (Norway) / (United States) Karoline Borg
- (Norway) Rebecca Steinheim
- (Norway) Emilie Løkting Johansen
- (Norway) Christine Homme
- (Norway) Anna Huse
- (Norway) Thea Granlund
- (Norway) Lise Løke
- (Norway) Nina Stokland
- (Norway) Kamilla Røed Érsek
- (Norway) Mari Hegna
- (Norway) Marte Jonstad Røkke
- (Norway) Susann Iren Hall
- (Norway) Martine Welfler
- (Norway) Tina Magnus
- (Norway) Christina Solheim Andersen
- (Norway) Catharina Fiskerstrand Broch
- (Norway) Alette Stang
- (Norway) Lorin Sendi
- (Norway) Emma Skinnehaugen
- (Norway) Pernille Wang Skaug
- (Norway) Mette Leipart
- (Norway) Hanne Andve
- (Norway) Frida Nåmo Rønning
- (Norway) Mariann Gabrielsen
- (Norway) Janne Håvelsrud Eklo
- (Norway) Sara Rønningen
- (Norway) Julie Granum
- (Norway) Kaja Kristensen
- (Norway) Vilde Andersen Vinje
- (Norway) Mie Rakstad
- (Norway) Lina Marie Jensen
- (Norway) Benedikte Kalstad Hernes
- (Norway) Lea Løkke-Øwre
- (Norway) Johanna Fossum
- (Norway) Ingrid Vehusheia
- (Norway) Kristin Halvorsen
- (Norway) Karoline Lund
- (Norway) Eira Aune
- (Norway) Henriette Jarnang
- (Norway) Kaja Røhne
- (Norway) Maria Keiserås Haugen
- (Norway) Vilde Tornes Finneide
- (Norway) Kristin Loraas Eiriksson
- (Norway) Mille Tveit Porsmyr
- (Norway) Ida Marie Kallhovd
- (Denmark) Pernille Huldgaard Christensen
- (Denmark) Sofie Fynbo Larsen
- (Denmark) Sara Jacobsen Madsen
- (Denmark) Marianne Haugsted
- (Denmark) Julie Stokkendal Poulsen
- (Iceland) Thea Imani Sturludóttir
- (Poland) Izabela Duda
