= Follo HK =

Norwegian handball club

Follo Håndballklubb Damer
- Short name: Follo HK Damer
- Founded: 2007
- Arena: Stil Arena, Langhus
- Capacity: 2,500
- Head coach: Thomas Engen
- League: REMA 1000-ligaen
- 2025–26: 10th
- Club colours

Follo HK is a handball club based in Ski, Follo. Both the men’s and the women’s team play in the top division in the country.

== Women’s team ==
The women’s team was promoted to the top division in 2023.

=== Current squad ===
Squad for the 2026–27 season

Goalkeepers

- 00 (Norway) Julie Nordevall
- 31 (Norway) Erle Hoel Olsen

Wingers
Right wing

- 5 (Norway) Oda Caroline Mørk
- 24 (Norway) Mia Holene Kvithyll

Left wing

- 2 (Norway) Celine Lyngholt-Osland
- 20 (Norway) Andrea Landås Gabrielsen

Line players

- 14 (Norway) Anette Rusten

Left back

- 6 (Norway) Karen Linnestad Spone
- 21 (Norway) Harrieth Toft Nordrum
- 36 (Norway) Celine Solberg Andersen
- 77 (Kosovo) Mirela Gjikokaj

Centre back

- 11 (Norway) Sara Benedicte Fredheim Barbosa
- 27 (Norway) Neah Pernille Kyrkjebø Lynghjem

Right back

- 4 (Norway) Anette Sundfær Johnsen
- 23 (Norway) Emilie Hattestad

=== 2026–2027 Transfers ===
Joining

- (Norway) Alexander Linløkken Pettersen (Head coach) (from (Norway) Bækkelagets SK (men))
- (Norway) Julie Nordevall (GK) (from (Norway) Storhamar HE)
- (Norway) Neah Pernille Kyrkjebø Lynghjem (CB) (from (Norway) Aker Topphåndball)
- (Norway) Erle Hoel Olsen (from own rows)
- (Norway) Celine Solberg Andersen (from own rows)

Leaving

- (Norway) Thomas Engen (Head coach) (to (Norway) Byåsen HE)
- (Norway) Tora Tande-Elton (GK) (to (Norway) Fredrikstad BK)
- Hante Satu Hamel (GK) (to Netherlands)
- (Norway) Margrethe Moen Kile (to (Norway) HK Rygge)
- (Norway) Line Strand-Larsen (LW) (to (Norway) Volda)
- (Norway) Iben Helland Flø (LB) (retires)
- (Norway) Mari Myrland (CB) (to (Norway) Larvik HK)
- (Norway) Tilde Alræk (CB) (retires)
- (Norway) Aurora Kristiansen (CB) (to (Norway) Sarpsborg IL)
- (Norway) Hanna Waaler Lindquist (P) (studies)
- (Norway) Marte Sirén Figenschau (P) (to (Denmark) HØJ Elite)

=== Technical staff ===
- Head coach: Alexander Linløkken Pettersen
- Assistant coach: Axel Reimblad
- Assistant coach: Tilde Alræk

=== Notable former club players ===
- (Norway) Tina Magnus
- (Norway) Catharina Fiskerstrand Broch
- (Norway) Tiril Spæren
- (Norway) Mie Rakstad
- (Norway) Mia Kristin Syverud
- (Norway) Kristiane Knutsen
- (Norway) Sara Møller
- (Norway) Mina Hesselberg
- (Norway) Martine Kårigstad Andersen
- (Norway) Jenny Sofie Sundt Utne
- (Norway) June Krogh
- (Norway) Guro Berland Husebø
- (Norway) Henriette Jäck Larsen
- (Norway) Silje Alvestad
- (Norway) Eline Osland
- (Norway) Tora Tande-Elton
- (Norway) Iben Helland Flø
- (Norway) Mari Myrland
- (Norway) Tilde Alræk
- (Denmark) Louise Engstrøm
- (Denmark) Melina Kristensen
- (Faroe Islands) Annika Fríðheim Petersen
- (Netherlands) Hante Satu Hamel

== Men’s team ==
The men’s team has been promoted to Norway’s top division three times: in 2008, 2019, and 2026.

=== Team ===
==== Current squad ====
Squad for the 2026–27 season

Goalkeepers
Left Wingers
Right Wingers
Line players

Left Backs
Central Backs
Right Backs

==== Transfers ====
Transfers for the 2026–27 season

Joining

Leaving

- (Norway) Tobias Skonnord Hansen (CB) to (Norway) ØIF Arendal
- (Norway) Mikkel Vestli (LP) to (Norway) Kolstad Håndball
