= Martine Kårigstad Andersen =

Norwegian handball player (born 2002)

Personal information
- Nationality: Norwegian
- Born: 7 May 2002 (age 24) Kristiansand, Norway
- Height: 1.77 m (5 ft 10 in)

Sport
- Sport: Handball
- Position: Left back
- Current club: Fana
- Number: 20

Senior clubs
- Years: Team
- 2019–2021: Vipers Kristiansand
- 2020–2021: → Randesund IL (loan)
- 2021–2022: Follo HK Damer
- 2022–01/2025: Vipers Kristiansand
- 2023–01/2025: → Fana (loan)
- 01/2025–2026: Fana
- 2026–: Sola HK
National team
Years	Team	Apps	(Gls)
2023–	Norway	1	(0)
Medal record
Junior World Championship
Gold medal – first place	2022 Slovenia

Martine Kårigstad Andersen (born 7 May 2002) is a Norwegian handball player for Fana and the Norway national team.

She also represented Norway at the 2021 European Women's U-19 Handball Championship, placing 9th.

== Achievements ==
- Junior World Championship:
  - Gold Medalist: 2022
- EHF Champions League:
  - Winner: 2022/2023
- Norwegian League:
  - Winner: 2022/2023, 2023/2024
- Norwegian Cup:
  - Winner: 2022/2023, 2023/2024

== Individual awards ==
Topscorer

- Topscorer of REMA 1000-ligaen: 2025/2026 (202 goals)

All-Star Team

- All-Star Left Back of the 2022 Women's Junior World Handball Championship.
- All Star Left Back of REMA 1000-ligaen: 2025/2026
