= Tertnes HE =

Norwegian handball club

Tertnes Håndball Elite
- Short name: Tertnes
- Founded: 25 January 1953; 73 years ago
- Arena: Åsane Arena, Bergen
- Capacity: 2,220
- Head coach: Tore Johannessen
- League: REMA 1000-ligaen
- 2025–26: 5th
- Club colours
Home	Away

Tertnes Håndball Elite is the women's handball team of the Norwegian multi-sports club Tertnes IL based in Bergen. The team plays in REMA 1000-ligaen, the top division in the country, since its promotion in 1992. It was founded on 23 January 1953.

== Results ==
=== Norway ===
- REMA 1000-ligaen
  - Silver: 1998/99, 2003/04, 2024/25
  - Bronze: 2001/02, 2004/05, 2005/06, 2008/09, 2010/11, 2012/13, 2013/14, 2014/15, 2018/19
- Norwegian Cup
  - Finalist: 2001/02, 2016, 2024

=== Europe ===
- EHF Cup
  - Silver: 1999/00

== Team ==
=== Current squad ===
Squad for the 2026–27 season

Goalkeeper

- 16 (Norway) Helle Kjellberg-Line
- 24 (Norway) Kadija Mårdalen

Wingers
RW

- 18 (Norway) Rikke Midtfjeld
- 19 (Norway) Vilde Janbu Fresvik

LW

- 8 (Norway) Stella Waagan Kruse
- 22 (Norway) Maria Bergslien Gald

Line players

- 17 (Norway) Ingvild Bersås Westersjø
- 23 (Norway) Viktoria Giske

Back players
LB

- 2 (Norway) Birgitte Karlsen Hagen
- 9 (Norway) Ingrid Remøy Evjen
- 15 (Norway) Bertine Moldestad-Evensen
- 28 (Norway) Nora Rosenberg

CB

- 7 (Switzerland) Avril Mikkelsen Frei
- 20 (Norway) Fanny Skindlo
- 27 (Norway) Ingeborg Rolseth Holt

RB

- 11 (Norway) Sara Eline Lauritzen
- 14 (Norway) Sofie Nilssen Ekerhovd
- 26 (Norway) Marie Rokkones Hansen

=== Transfers ===
Transfers for the 2026–27 season.

Joining

- (Norway) Ingrid Remøy Evjen (LB) (from (Norway) Bjarg IL)
- (Norway) Bertine Moldestad-Evensen (LB) (from (Norway) Åsane IL)
- (Norway) Ingeborg Rolseth Holt (CB) (from (Norway) Gjerpen Håndball)
- (Norway) Sofie Nilssen Ekerhovd (RB) (from (Norway) Sotra SK)
- (Norway) Ingvild Bersås Westersjø (P) (from (Norway) Gjerpen Håndball)

Leaving

- (Norway) Henriette Espetvedt Eggen (LB) (to (Denmark) Team Esbjerg)
- (Norway) Martine Hellesø Knutsen (LB) (retires)
- (Norway) Emma Holtet (P) (to (Denmark) Nordvestjysk Elite)
- (Norway) Marthe Hatløy Walde (P) (retires)

=== Technical staff ===
- Head coach: Tore Johannessen
- Assistant coach: Jarle Alver
- Goalkeeper coach: Jan Stankiewicz
- Physiotherapist: Martin Flesland

=== Notable former national team players ===
- (Norway) Cecilie Leganger
- (Norway) Kjersti Grini
- (Norway) Terese Pedersen
- (Norway) Mette Davidsen
- (Norway) Hege Johansen
- (Norway) Kari-Anne Henriksen
- (Norway) Marianne Rokne
- (Norway) Mia Hundvin
- (Norway) Stine Skogrand
- (Norway) Kjerstin Boge Solås
- (Austria) Iris Morhammer
- (Austria) Steffi Ofenböck
- (Denmark) Janne Kolling
- (Denmark) Anne Petersen Waage
- (Japan) Sakura Hauge

=== Notable former club players ===
- (Norway) Hege Christin Vikebø
- (Norway) Linn Thomassen
- (Norway) Marie Liljegren
- (Norway) Sissel Nygård Pedersen
- (Norway) Gunhild Sævereid
- (Norway) Cecilie Longva
- (Norway) Mette Ommundsen
- (Norway) Elisabeth Gjesdal
- (Norway) Bodil Flo Berge
- (Norway) Sølvi Hylleseth
- (Norway) Stine Lund Andreassen
- (Norway) Marthe Reinkind
- (Norway) Renate Urne
- (Norway) Henriette Sognnæs
- (Norway) Elise Huseklepp
- (Norway) Catharina Skorpen Furnes
- (Norway) Marianne Sundsbak
- (Norway) Johanne Jerven Hestad
- (Norway) Karoline Dyrhol Slenes
- (Norway) Sylvia Linn Hovland
- (Norway) Nina Arnesen
- (Norway) Anne Jorunn Kristensen
- (Norway) Hege Johansen
- (Norway) Jeanette Haga Holgersen
- (Norway) Celine Sivertsen
- (Norway) Marie Davidsen
- (Norway) Tina Abdulla
- (Norway) Kristin Nørstebø
- (Norway) Katarina Berens
- (Sweden) Thea Stankiewicz
- (Norway) Madeleine Hilby
- (Norway) Rikke Øyerhamn
- (Norway) Eli Smørgrav Skogstrand
- (Norway) Henrikke Hauge Kjølholdt
- (Norway) Josefine Gundersen Lien
- (Norway) Sanne Løkka Hagen
- (Norway) Synna Lien
- (Norway) Hermine Motzfeldt Auberg
- (Norway) Eva Erdal Moen
- (Norway) Henriette Espetvedt Eggen
- (Norway) Martine Hellesø Knutsen
- (Norway) Emma Holtet
- (Norway) Marthe Hatløy Walde
