= Henriette Espetvedt Eggen =

Norwegian handball player (born 2002)

Personal information
- Nationality: Norwegian
- Born: 16 December 2002 (age 23) Bergen, Norway
- Height: 1.84 m (6 ft 0 in)

Sport
- Sport: Handball
- Position: Left back
- Current club: Team Esbjerg
- Number: 10

Senior clubs
- Years: Team
- –: Gneist IL
- –: Fyllingen IL
- 2021–2026: Tertnes HE
- 2026–: Team Esbjerg
National team
- Years: Team
- –: Norway
Medal record
Junior World Championship
Gold medal – first place	2022 Slovenia

Henriette Espetvedt Eggen (born 16 December 2002) is a Norwegian handball player for Team Esbjerg.

Eggen was part of the team that won the Junior World Championship in 2022.

Eggen is also a part of the extended Norwegian national team.

== Achievements ==
- Junior World Championship:
  - Gold Medalist: 2022
- Norwegian Cup:
  - Finalist: 2024
