= Eli Marie Raasok =

Norwegian handball player (born 1996)

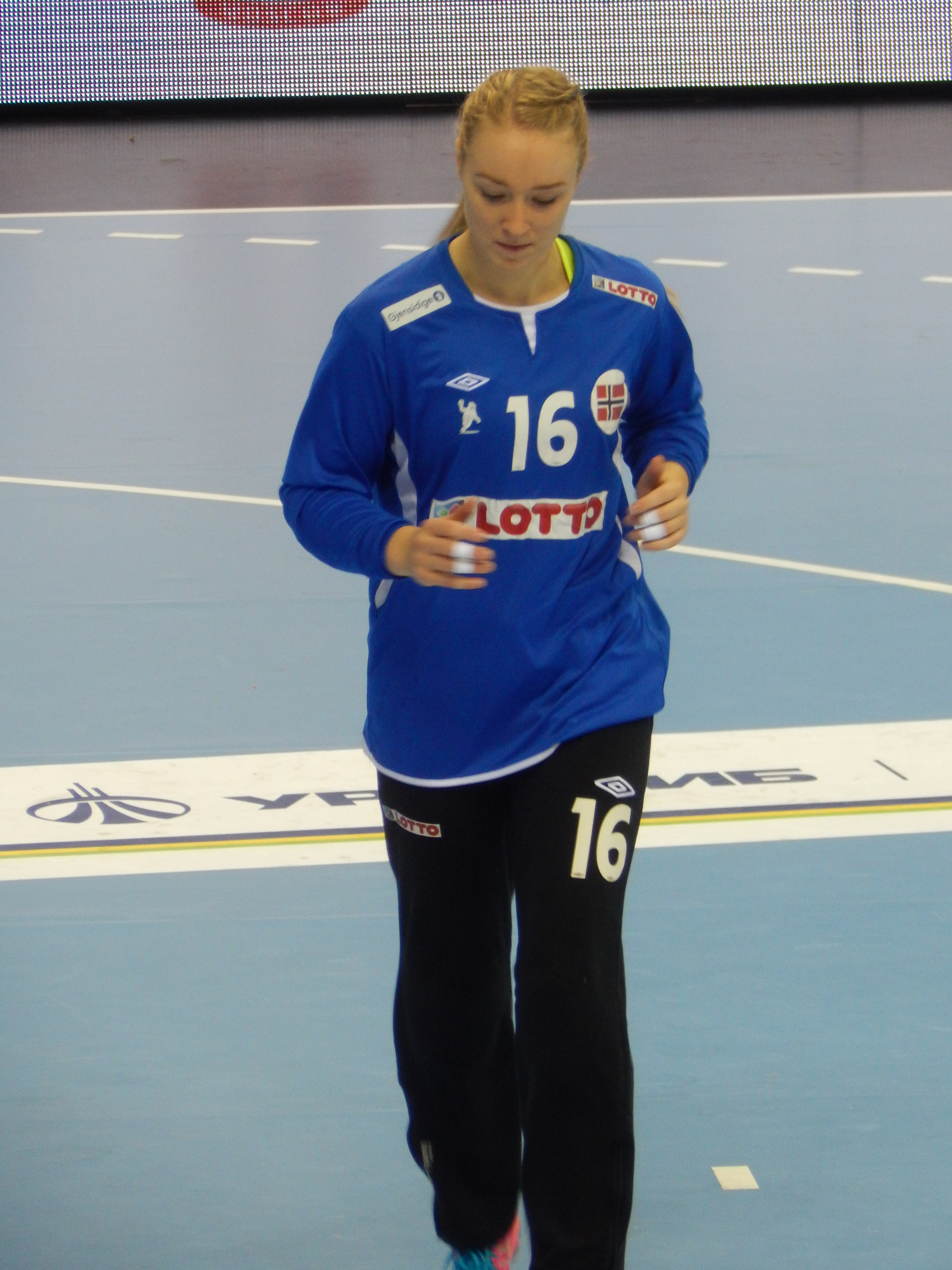
- Raasok in 2016

Personal information
- Full name: Eli Marie Raasok
- Nationality: Norwegian
- Born: 21 November 1996 (age 29) Oslo, Norway
- Height: 1.76 m (5 ft 9 in)

Sport
- Sport: Handball
- Position: Goalkeeper
- Current club: Storhamar HE
- Number: 30

Youth career
- Years: Team
- –: HK Trøgstad
- 2013–2014: Oppsal

Senior clubs
- Years: Team
- 2014–2015: Oppsal
- 2015–2017: Fjellhammer IL
- 2017–2020: Oppsal
- 2020–2021: Silkeborg-Voel KFUM
- 2021–2022: Randers HK
- 2022–: Storhamar HE
National team
Years	Team	Apps	(Gls)
2023–	Norway	34	(1)
Medal record
World Championship
Gold medal – first place	2025 Germany/Netherlands
European Championship
Gold medal – first place	2024 Austria/Hungary/Switzerland

Eli Marie Raasok (born 21 November 1996) is a Norwegian handball player who plays for Storhamar HE and the Norwegian national team.

On 4 February 2021, it was announced that she had signed a 1-year contract with Randers HK, from Silkeborg-Voel KFUM.

She participated at the 2013 Youth European Championship, placing 7th and at the 2016 Women's Junior World Handball Championship in Russia, placing 5th.

She won her first gold medal at the 2024 European Championship, beating Denmark in the final.

At the 2025 World Championship she won her first World Championship gold medal.

== Achievements ==
- World Championship:
  - Winner: 2025
- European Championship:
  - Winner: 2024
- EHF European League:
  - Winner: 2023/2024
- Norwegian League
  - Gold: 2024/2025
  - Silver: 2021/2022, 2022/2023, 2023/2024, 2025/2026
- Norwegian Cup:
  - Winner: 2024, 2025
  - Finalist: 2023/2024

== Individual awards ==
- All Star Goalkeeper of REMA 1000-ligaen: 2023/2024, 2024/2025, 2025/2026
