= Maja Furu Sæteren =

Norwegian handball player (born 2003)

Personal information
- Nationality: Norwegian
- Born: 14 May 2003 (age 23) Kragerø, Norway
- Height: 1.72 m (5 ft 8 in)

Sport
- Sport: Handball
- Position: Left back
- Current club: Larvik HK
- Number: 26

Youth career
- Years: Team
- 2007–2019: Kragerø IF

Senior clubs
- Years: Team
- 2019–2020: Kragerø IF
- 2020–2027: Larvik HK
- 2027–: Nykøbing Falster
National team
Years	Team	Apps	(Gls)
2023–	Norway	16	(31)
Medal record
World Championship
Silver medal – second place	2023 Denmark/Norway/Sweden
Junior World Championship
Gold medal – first place	2022 Slovenia

Maja Furu Sæteren (born 14 May 2003) is a Norwegian handball player for Larvik HK and the Norwegian national team.

In September 2021 the Norwegian newspaper Verdens Gang named Furu Sæteren as one of the biggest talents in Norwegian handball.

== International career ==
In July 2022, Furu Sæteren and the rest of the Norwegian junior handball team became World Champions after winning 31–29 against Hungary in the finale.

On 7 November 2023, she was selected to represent Norway at the 2023 World Women's Handball Championship. Here she won silver medals, losing to France in the final.

== Club career ==
On 18 April 2024, Sæteren became historic. At the age of 20 she became the player who scored the most goals in the Norwegian Top Division ever, in one single season. Before the final round she had scored 222 goals in 24 matches and ended the season with 234 goals in 25 matches. An average of 9,4 goals per match. This meant she surpassed the old record, held by Heidi Løke (2010/2011) and Linn-Kristin Riegelhuth Koren (2006/2007) who both ended with 221 goals.

== Achievements ==
- World Championship:
  - Silver Medalist: 2023
- Junior World Championship:
  - Gold Medalist: 2022
- REMA 1000-ligaen:
  - Bronze: 2024/2025
- Norwegian Cup:
  - Finalist: 2025

== Individual awards ==
MVP

- Most Valuable Player of REMA 1000-ligaen: 2023/2024

Topscorer

- Topscorer of REMA 1000-ligaen 2023/2024: (234 goals), 2024/2025: (192 goals)

All-Star Team

- All-Star Left Back of REMA 1000-ligaen: 2022/2023, 2023/2024, 2024/2025

Other awards

- Assist queen of REMA 1000-ligaen: 2025/2026 (158 assists)
- Best Rookie of REMA 1000-ligaen: 2022/2023
