= Romerike Ravens =

Norwegian handball club

- Short name: Romerike Ravens
- Founded: 1977 (as Rælingen HK), then on 10 February 2021 the women's team split from the club and was founded as Romerike Topphåndballklubb, with league name Romerike Ravens
- Dissolved: 18 August 2026
- Arena: Skedsmohallen, Lillestrøm
- Capacity: 1,600
- President: Hæge Fagerhus Asak
- Club colours

Romerike Ravens was a women's handball team based in Lillestrøm, Romerike. The team played in the 1st division, the second tier of Norwegian handball. They played in the REMA 1000-ligaen, the top division in the country, from its promotion in 2020, then as Rælingen HK, to its relegation in the 2025-26 season. From 2021 the women's elite handball team was renamed Romerike Ravens from the previous club name Rælingen HK.

On 18 August 2026, the club went bankrupt.

== Team ==
=== Transfers ===
Transfers for the season 2026-27

Joining

Leaving

- (Norway) Marthe Davidsen Hellevik (GK)
- (Norway) Daniella Holm (GK)
- (Norway) Ane Emilie Westerhus Bolstad (GK)
- (Norway) Julie Søfting Tovslid (GK) (to (Denmark) Ajax København)
- (Norway) Kristina Granli Nordvik (LW)
- (Norway) Anna Lunke Norum (LW)
- (Norway) Silje Hallås (LW)
- (Norway) Fredrikke Sundsby Kjølstad (LB) (to (Norway) Oppsal)
- (Norway) Julie Hattestad (LB)
- (Norway) Ane Engan Haugen (LB) (to (Norway) Gjerpen HK Skien)
- (Norway) Bibi Aandewiel (LB)
- (Norway) Isabel Gunnerød (LB)
- (Norway) Hansine Brune Skorgevik (LB)
- (Norway) Marte Sofie Syverud (LB)
- (Norway) Ina Jåtten (CB)
- (Norway) Lorin Sendi (CB) (to (Sweden) Boden Handboll IF)
- (Norway) Marte Juuhl Svensson (CB) (to (Norway) Storhamar HE)
- (Norway) Mia Kvarme (RB)
- (Norway) Vilde Bjørnsen (RB)
- (Norway) Elvira Rensmoen (RW)
- (Norway) Marie Selvaag (RW) (to (Norway) Oppsal)
- (Norway) Bettina Ranvik (P)
- (Norway) Synnøve Lind Edvardsen (P)
- (Sweden) Nora Lundell (P)
- (Norway) Karin Mollatt (P)

=== Notable former National Team players ===
- (Norway) Jeanette Nilsen
- (Norway) Anniken Wollik

=== Notable former club players ===
- (Norway) Åse Karin Johannessen (2002–2010)
- (Norway) Tonje Rue Barkenes
- (Norway) Andrea Ohrvik
- (Norway) Ida Doornbos
- (Norway) Sara Blankevoort
- (Norway) Marie Lindvik Jørstad
- (Norway) Leila Laksiri
- (Norway) Kathrine Hjelmeland
- (Norway) Silje Arnesen
- (Norway) Kine Sundby
- (Norway) Lene Petterson Heiberg
- (Norway) Andrea Hanssen
- (Norway) Julie Bøe Jacobsen
- (Norway) Rikke Skiri Østigård
- (Norway) Marte Juuhl Svensson
- (Norway) Emma Holtet
- (Norway) Ida Ringlund Hansen
- (Norway) Frida Haug Hoel
- (Norway) Maja Muri
- (Norway) Kristin Dorthea Eskerud
- (Norway) Vilde Johansen
- (Norway) Zaynap Elmrani
- (Norway) Bibi Aandewiel
- (Norway) Merlinda Qorraj
- (Norway) Astrid Mjøen Holstad
- (Norway) Marielle Daae Nordvang
- (Norway) Constance Hedenstad
- (Norway) Miriann Sæther
- (Norway) Karoline Strømberg
- (Brazil) Caroline Martins
- (Denmark) Sisse Marie Bøge Fahlberg
- (Denmark) Isabella Jacobsen
- (Denmark) Rikke Thorngaard
- (Sweden) Hanna Örtorp
- (Sweden) Linnea Säreborn
- (Sweden) Alexandra Lundström
