= Elkjøp-ligaen (women's handball) =

Norwegian women's handball league

- Sport: Handball
- Founded: 1967
- No. of teams: 14
- Country: Norway
- Confederation: EHF
- Most recent champion: Sola HK (2025/26)
- Most titles: Larvik HK (19 titles)
- Broadcasters: TV 2, TV 2 Sport 1, TV 2 Sport 2
- Level on pyramid: 1
- Relegation to: 1. divisjon
- International cups: EHF Champions League; EHF European League
- Website: http://www.handball.no
- 2026–27 season

Elkjøp-ligaen is the premier women's professional handball league for Norwegian handball clubs. It is administered by the Norwegian Handball Federation, and the winners are recognized as Norwegian champions. It was established in 1967, and it is currently contested by fourteen teams. Larvik HK is the championship's most successful team with nineteen titles, followed by IL Vestar with nine and Vipers Kristiansand with seven.

Currently the winner of the championship play-offs is granted a spot in the EHF Champions League's group stage.

There are fourteen teams in the 2026/27 season, where Sola HK is the defending champion. Ravens and Haslum were relegated.

Team	Location	Arena	Finished pos. in last season
Byåsen	Trondheim	Kolstad Arena	9th
Fana	Bergen	Fana Arena	7th
Fjellhammer	Lørenskog	Fjellhammer Arena	12th
Flint Tønsberg	Tønsberg	REMA 1000 Arena	1st (in 1. divisjon)
Follo	Ski	Stil Arena	10th
Fredrikstad	Fredrikstad	Kongstenhallen	6th
Gjerpen	Skien	Skienshallen	8th
Molde	Molde	Molde Arena	3rd place, bronze medalist(s)
Larvik	Larvik	Jotron Arena Larvik	4th
Oppsal	Oslo	Oppsal Arena	11th
Sola	Sola	Åsenhallen	1st place, gold medalist(s)
Storhamar	Hamar	Boligpartner Arena	2nd place, silver medalist(s)
Tertnes	Bergen	Åsane Arena	5th
Utleira	Trondheim	Utleirahallen	2nd (in 1. divisjon)

== List of champions ==
The complete list of the Norwegian handball champions since 1968.

Season	(gold) Gold	(silver) Silver	(bronze) Bronze
1967–68	Sørskogbygda	IL Vestar	Brandval
1968–69	Skjeberg	Brandval	IL Vestar
1969–70	Brandval	Sørskogbygda	SK Freidig
1970–71	SK Freidig	Brandval	IL Vestar
1971–72	IL Vestar	Brandval	SK Freidig
1972–73	IL Vestar	Stabæk IF	SK Freidig
1973–74	IL Vestar	Brandval	Skjeberg
1974–75	IL Vestar	SK Freidig	Skjeberg
1975–76	IL Vestar	Skjeberg	Nordstrand IF
1976–77	IL Vestar	Skjeberg	Nordstrand IF
1977–78	IL Vestar	Brandval	Skogn
1978–79	IL Vestar	Skjeberg	Brandval
1979–80	Skogn	Skjeberg	IL Vestar
1980–81	Skogn	Skjeberg	Nordstrand IF
1981–82	Skjeberg	Skogn	Sverresborg IF
1982–83	Skjeberg	Sverresborg IF	Skogn
1983–84	Bækkelagets SK	Sverresborg IF	Skjeberg
1984–85	SK Freidig	Gjerpen IF	Sverresborg IF
1985–86	Sverresborg IF	Gjerpen IF	Byåsen HE
1986–87	Byåsen HE	KSH-73	Nordstrand IF
1987–88	Byåsen HE	IL Vestar	Gjerpen IF
1988–89	IL Vestar	Gjerpen IF	Nordstrand IF
1989–90	Byåsen HE	Gjerpen IF	IL Vestar
1990–91	Gjerpen IF	Byåsen HE	Lunner IL
1991–92	Bækkelagets SK	Gjerpen IF	Sjetne
1992–93	Gjerpen IF	Bækkelagets SK	Sjetne
1993–94	Larvik HK	Bækkelagets SK	Gjerpen IF
1994–95	Bækkelagets SK	Larvik HK	Gjerpen IF
1995–96	Byåsen HE	Bækkelagets SK	Larvik HK
1996–97	Larvik HK	Bækkelagets SK	Byåsen HE
1997–98	Byåsen HE	Bækkelagets SK	Larvik HK
1998–99	Bækkelagets SK	Tertnes HE	Byåsen HE
1999–00	Larvik HK	Bækkelagets SK	Nordstrand IF
2000–01	Larvik HK	Bækkelagets SK	Nordstrand IF
2001–02	Larvik HK	Nordstrand IF	Tertnes HE
2002–03	Larvik HK	Nordstrand IF	IK Våg
2003–04	Nordstrand IF	Tertnes HE	Larvik HK
2004–05	Larvik HK	Byåsen HE	Tertnes HE
2005–06	Larvik HK	Byåsen HE	Tertnes HE
2006–07	Larvik HK	Byåsen HE	Gjerpen IF
2007–08	Larvik HK	Byåsen HE	Storhamar HE
2008–09	Larvik HK	Byåsen HE	Tertnes HE
2009–10	Larvik HK	Byåsen HE	Storhamar HE
2010–11	Larvik HK	Byåsen HE	Tertnes HE
2011–12	Larvik HK	Byåsen HE	Storhamar HE
2012–13	Larvik HK	Byåsen HE	Tertnes HE
2013–14	Larvik HK	Byåsen HE	Tertnes HE
2014–15	Larvik HK	Glassverket IF	Tertnes HE
2015–16	Larvik HK	Byåsen HE	Glassverket IF
2016–17	Larvik HK	Vipers Kristiansand	Glassverket IF
2017–18	Vipers Kristiansand	Larvik HK	Storhamar HE
2018–19	Vipers Kristiansand	Storhamar HE	Tertnes HE
2019–20	Vipers Kristiansand	Storhamar HE	Byåsen HE
2020–21	Vipers Kristiansand	Storhamar HE	Sola HK
2021–22	Vipers Kristiansand	Storhamar HE	Sola HK
2022–23	Vipers Kristiansand	Storhamar HE	Sola HK
2023–24	Vipers Kristiansand	Storhamar HE	Sola HK
2024–25	Storhamar HE	Sola HK	Larvik HK
2025–26	Sola HK	Storhamar HE	Molde Elite

== List of topscorers ==
Season	Goals	Name	Club
1974–75	(Norway) Karen Fladset	98	IL Vestar
1975–76	(Norway) Karen Fladset	115	IL Vestar
1976–77	(Norway) Karen Fladset	123	IL Vestar
1977–78
1978–79	(Norway) Karen Fladset	130	IL Vestar
1979–80
1980–81	(Norway) Anita Taring	116	Nordstrand IF
1981–82
1982–83	(Norway) Wenche Halvorsen	153	Skjeberg
1983–84	(Norway) Kristin Glosimot	143	Bækkelagets SK
1984–85	(Norway) Sissel Buchholdt	183	SK Freidig
1985–86	(Norway) Wenche Halvorsen	168	Skjeberg
1986–87	(Norway) Hanne Hegh	178	Gjerpen IF
1987–88	(Norway) Heidi Sundal	184	Nordstrand IF
1988–89	(Sweden) Mia Hermansson-Högdahl	149	Byåsen IL
1989–90	(Norway) Kjersti Grini	179	Lunner
1990–91	(Norway) Siri Eftedal	168	Gjerpen IF
1991–92	(Norway) Siri Eftedal	189	Gjerpen IF
1992–93	(Denmark) Anja Andersen	143	Bækkelagets SK
1993–94	(Norway) Kjersti Grini	184	Bækkelagets SK
1994–95	(Norway) Ingrid Steen	183	Refstad-Veitvet
1995–96	(Norway) Trine Haltvik	167	Byåsen IL
1996–97	(Norway) Kjersti Grini	167	Bækkelagets SK
1997–98	(Norway) Trine Haltvik	211	Byåsen IL
1998–99	(Norway) Trine Haltvik	150	Byåsen IL
1999–00	(Sweden) / (Norway) Lina Olsson Rosenberg	173	Larvik HK
2000–01	(Austria) Ausra Fridrikas	183	Bækkelagets SK
2001–02	(Austria) Ausra Fridrikas	168	Bækkelagets SK
2002–03	(Norway) Vigdis Hårsaker	200	Byåsen IL
2003–04	(Norway) Katja Nyberg	140	Larvik HK
2004–05	(Norway) Gøril Snorroeggen	184	Byåsen IL
2005–06	(Norway) Linn Jørum Sulland	159	Stabæk IF
2005–06	(Norway) Linn-Kristin Riegelhuth Koren	159	Larvik HK
2006–07	(Norway) Linn-Kristin Riegelhuth Koren	221	Larvik HK
2007–08	(Poland) Izabela Duda	203	Storhamar HE
2008–09	(Norway) Heidi Løke	216	Larvik HK
2009–10	(Norway) Heidi Løke	204	Larvik HK
2010–11	(Norway) Heidi Løke	221	Larvik HK
2011–12	(Norway) Linn Gossé	127	Tertnes HE
2012–13	(Poland) Izabela Duda	177	Oppsal
2013–14	(Denmark) Annette Jensen	145	Vipers Kristiansand
2014–15	(Norway) Maja Jakobsen	162	Storhamar HE
2015–16	(Norway) Malin Holta	166	Sola HK
2016–17	(Norway) Tonje Nøstvold	157	Sola HK
2017–18	(Denmark) Melanie Bak	143	Gjerpen IF
2018–19	(Norway) Ragnhild Valle Dahl	148	Molde Elite
2019–20	(Norway) Emilie Hovden	161	Storhamar HE
2020–21	(Norway) Malin Holta	75 (Note: The season was finished before it was halfway played. The teams played between 9 and 12 (out of 22) matches.)	Sola HK
2021–22	(Norway) Christine Karlsen Alver	206	Fana
2022–23	(Norway) Mona Obaidli	155	Molde Elite
2023–24	(Norway) Maja Furu Sæteren	234	Larvik HK
2024–25	(Norway) Maja Furu Sæteren	192	Larvik HK
2025–26	(Norway) Martine Kårigstad Andersen	202	Fana

== Statistics ==
=== EHF coefficients ===
The following data indicates Norwegian coefficient rankings between European handball leagues.

Country ranking

EHF League Ranking for 2023/24 season:

- 1. (5) (Norway) REMA 1000-ligaen (185.67)
- 2. (1) (Hungary) Nemzeti Bajnokság I (172.33)
- 3. (2) (France) Ligue Butagaz Énergie (168.33)
- 4. (3) (Russia) Russian Superleague (139.00)
- 5. (4) (Denmark) Bambusa Kvindeligaen (127.00)
- 6. (6) (Romania) Liga Națională (124.00)

=== In European competitions ===
	Champions League				EHF European League				EHF European Cup			Cup Winners' Cup			
	C	Winning year(s)	RU	SF	C		RU	SF	C	RU	SF	C	Winning year(s)	RU	SF
Vipers Kristiansand	3	2021, 2022, 2023	0	3	0		1	1	0	0	0	0		0	0
Larvik HK	1	2011	2	4	0		1	0	0	0	0	2	2005, 2008	1	1
Storhamar HE	0		0	0	1	2024	0	0	0	0	0	0		0	0
Bækkelagets SK	0		0	0	0		1	1	0	1	0	2	1998, 1999	1	0
IL Vestar	0		0	2	0		0	0	0	0	0	0		0	0
Tertnes HE	0		0	0	0		1	1	0	0	0	0		0	1
Gjerpen IF	0		0	0	0		0	0	0	1	0	0		0	3
Nordstrand IF	0		0	0	0		0	1	0	0	0	0		1	0
Byåsen	0		0	0	0		0	0	0	0	1	0		1	3
IK Junkeren	0		0	0	0		0	0	0	0	1	0		1	0
TOTAL	4 titles		2	9	1 title		4	4	0	2	2	4 titles		5	8

== Notable foreign players ==
List of foreign players who previously played or currently play in Elkjøp-ligaen. Bold indicate players currently playing in the league (2026/27).

Angola

- (Angola) Carolina Morais

Argentina

- (Argentina) Elke Karsten

Austria

- (Austria) Ausra Fridrikas
- (Austria) Iris Morhammer
- (Austria) Kristina Logvin
- (Austria) Marina Budecevic
- (Austria) Petra Blazek
- (Austria) Sorina Teodorovic
- (Austria) Stanka Božović
- (Austria) Steffi Ofenböck

Belarus

- (Belarus) Iryna Tryzno
- (Belarus) Katsiaryna Silitskaya

Brazil

- (Brazil) Bárbara Arenhart
- (Brazil) Caroline Martins
- (Brazil) Chana Masson
- (Brazil) Dayane Rocha
- (Brazil) Gabriela Moreschi
- (Brazil) Mariane Oliveira Fernandes
- (Brazil) Mayssa Pessoa
- (Brazil) Tamires Morena Lima

Bulgaria

- (Bulgaria) Polina Gencheva

Canada

- (Canada) Kimberley Ewanovich

Czech Republic

- (Czech Republic) Erika Polozova
- (Czech Republic) Iva Zamorska
- (Czech Republic) Jana Knedlíková
- (Czech Republic) Markéta Jeřábková
- (Czech Republic) Markéta Šustáčková
- (Czech Republic) Veronika Malá

Croatia

- (Croatia) Ana Debelić
- (Croatia) Ina Gudelj
- (Croatia) Katarina Ježić
- (Croatia) Marina Hrvatsko Kevo
- (Croatia) Nataša Janković
- (Croatia) Senka Buljan
- (Croatia) Suzana Zuljani
- (Croatia) Teodora Tomac

Denmark

- (Denmark) Anja Andersen
- (Denmark) Ann Grete Nørgaard
- (Denmark) Anne Petersen Waage
- (Denmark) Annette Jensen
- (Denmark) Astrid Friis Larsen
- (Denmark) Camilla Andersen
- (Denmark) Cecilie Mørch Hansen
- (Denmark) Charlotte Bisser
- (Denmark) **Freja Vinther Christensen**
- (Denmark) Frederikke Gulmark
- (Denmark) Gitte Madsen
- (Denmark) Hanne Frandsen
- (Denmark) Janne Kolling
- (Denmark) Julie Gantzel Pedersen
- (Denmark) Julie Stokkendal Poulsen
- (Denmark) Karen Brødsgaard
- (Denmark) Karoline Fahlberg
- (Denmark) Kristina Bille
- (Denmark) Lene Rantala
- (Denmark) Lise Binger
- (Denmark) Louise Engstrøm
- (Denmark) Louise Pedersen
- (Denmark) Lærke Sofie Sørensen
- (Denmark) Maja Eiberg Jørgensen
- (Denmark) Marianne Haugsted
- (Denmark) Mathilde Berner Rømer
- (Denmark) Mathilde Kristensen
- (Denmark) Melanie Bak
- (Denmark) Melanie Felber
- (Denmark) Melina Kristensen
- (Denmark) Merete Møller
- (Denmark) Mie Sørensen
- (Denmark) Michelle Brandstrup
- (Denmark) Pernille Huldgaard Christensen
- (Denmark) Rikke Thorngaard
- (Denmark) Sandra Toft
- (Denmark) Sanne Bak Pedersen
- (Denmark) Sara Jacobsen Madsen
- (Denmark) Sarah Nørklit Lønborg
- (Denmark) Sarah Paulsen
- (Denmark) Sisse Marie Bøge Fahlberg
- (Denmark) Sofie Fynbo Larsen
- (Denmark) Sofie Winther-Hansen
- (Denmark) Susan Andersen
- (Denmark) Vivi Storvang
- (Denmark) **Alberte Ebler**

Faroe Islands

- (Faroe Islands) Annika Fríðheim Petersen
- (Faroe Islands) Pernille Brandenborg

France

- (France) Océane Sercien-Ugolin
- (France) Raphaëlle Tervel

Germany

- (Germany) Angie Geschke
- (Germany) Mia Zschocke
- (Germany) Luisa Schulze

Hungary

- (Hungary) Blanka Kajdon
- (Hungary) Gabriella Juhász
- (Hungary) Renáta Kári-Horváth
- (Hungary) Rita Lakatos
- (Hungary) Zsuzsanna Tomori

Iceland

- (Iceland) Berglind Íris Hansdóttir
- (Iceland) Birna Berg Haraldsdóttir
- (Iceland) Helena Örvarsdóttir
- (Iceland) Hildigunnur Einarsdóttir
- (Iceland) Thea Imani Sturludóttir
- (Iceland) Þórey Rósa Stefánsdóttir

Italy

- (Italy) Irene Fanton

Japan

- (Japan) Sakura Hauge
- (Japan) Sora Ishikawa

Kosovo

- (Kosovo) **Mirela Gjikokaj**
- (Kosovo) Merlinda Qorraj

Montenegro

- (Montenegro) Alma Hasanić Grizović
- (Montenegro) Anastasija Marsenić

Netherlands

- (Netherlands) Annick Lipman
- (Netherlands) Birgit Van Os
- (Netherlands) Charris Rozemalen
- (Netherlands) Talissa Sabrina Groen
- (Netherlands) Jessy Kramer
- (Netherlands) Larissa Nüsser
- (Netherlands) Lois Abbingh
- (Netherlands) Lynn Knippenborg
- (Netherlands) Lynn Molenaar
- (Netherlands) Martine Smeets
- (Netherlands) Merel Freriks
- (Netherlands) Rinka Duijndam
- (Netherlands) Romé Celine Steverink

North Macedonia

- (North Macedonia) Ivana Gakidova

Poland

- (Poland) Izabela Duda
- (Poland) Daria Boltromiuk
- (Poland) Alina Wojtas
- (Poland) Aleksandra Zimny
- (Poland) Alicja Główczak
- (Poland) Alicja Lucyna Zacharska
- (Poland) Bożena Karkut
- (Poland) Patrycja Świerżewska
- (Poland) Marlena Urbańska
- (Poland) Mirella Mierzejewska
- (Poland) Wioletta Luberecka

Romania

- (Romania) Anca Mihaela Stoica

Russia

- (Russia) Anna Vyakhireva

Slovakia

- (Slovakia) Simona Szarková

Slovenia

- (Slovenia) Maja Breznik

Spain

- (Spain) Reyes Baello Vidal
- (Spain) Nerea Pena
- (Spain) Lysa Tchaptchet
- (Spain) Paula Arcos

South Korea

- (South Korea) Jeong-Ho Hong

Sweden

- (Sweden) Karin Nilsson
- (Sweden) Mia Hermansson-Högdahl
- (Sweden) Lina Olsson Rosenberg
- (Sweden) Therese Helgesson
- (Sweden) Emma Jonsson
- (Sweden) Sara Nirvander
- (Sweden) Ulrika Olsson
- (Sweden) Karin Carlsson
- (Sweden) Martina Thörn
- (Sweden) Sandra Wrede
- (Sweden) Cassandra Tollbring
- (Sweden) Hanna Åhlén
- (Sweden) Elinore Johansson
- (Sweden) Moa Fredriksson
- (Sweden) Linnea Arrhenius
- (Sweden) Louise Karlsson
- (Sweden) Jenny Caroline Sandgren
- (Sweden) Esmeralda Fetahovic
- (Sweden) Evelina Eriksson
- (Sweden) Isabelle Gulldén
- (Sweden) Olivia Löfqvist
- (Sweden) Sofie Börjesson
- (Sweden) Jamina Roberts
- (Sweden) Nina Koppang
- (Sweden) Carin Strömberg
- (Sweden) Thea Stankiewicz
- (Sweden) Hanna Örtorp
- (Sweden) Linnea Säreborn
- (Sweden) Nora Lundell
- (Sweden) Jenny Carlson
- (Sweden) Fanny Elovson

Switzerland

- (Switzerland) Karin Weigelt
- (Switzerland) Mia Emmenegger

Tunisia

- (Tunisia) Raja Toumi
- (Tunisia) Ines Khouildi

Turkey

- (Turkey) Yeliz Özel

United Kingdom

- (United Kingdom) Britt Goodwin
- (United Kingdom) Zoe van der Weel

United States

- (United States) Karoline Borg

== Names of the competition ==
- 1967–1975: Hovedserien
- 1975–1993: 1. divisjon
- 1993–2000: Eliteserien
- 2000–2005: Gildeserien
- 2005–2007: Eliteserien
- 2007–2014: Postenligaen, after Posten Norge
- 2014–2017: GRUNDIGligaen, after Grundig
- 2017–2019: Eliteserien
- 2019–2026: REMA 1000-ligaen, after REMA 1000
- 2026–: Elkjøp-ligaen, after Elkjøp

== See also ==
- Norway women's national handball team
- Norwegian Women's Handball Cup
