= 2025–26 Women's EHF Champions League group stage =

The 2025–26 Women's EHF Champions League group stage was played between 6 September 2025 and 22 February 2026 to determine the twelve teams advancing to the knockout stage of the 2025–26 Women's EHF Champions League.

== Draw ==
The draw was held on 27 June 2025 in Vienna, Austria.

=== Seeding ===
The seeding was announced on 26 June 2025.

Pot 1	Pot 2	Pot 3	Pot 4
(Hungary) Győri Audi ETO KC (Denmark) Odense Håndbold (France) Metz Handball (Norway) Storhamar HE (Romania) CSM București (Germany) HB Ludwigsburg	(Hungary) FTC-Rail Cargo Hungaria (Denmark) Team Esbjerg (France) Brest Bretagne Handball (Romania) CS Gloria Bistrița (Germany) Borussia Dortmund	(Slovenia) RK Krim Mercator (Croatia) HC Podravka Vegeta (Montenegro) OTP Group Budućnost	(Hungary) DVSC Schaeffler (Denmark) Ikast Håndbold

== Format ==
In each group, teams played against each other in a double round-robin format, with home and away matches.

== Tiebreakers ==
In the group stage, teams were ranked according to points (2 points for a win, 1 point for a draw, 0 points for a loss). After completion of the group stage, if two or more teams had the same number of points, the ranking was determined as follows:

1. Highest number of points in matches between the teams directly involved;
2. Superior goal difference in matches between the teams directly involved;
3. Highest number of goals scored in matches between the teams directly involved;
4. Superior goal difference in all matches of the group;
5. Highest number of plus goals in all matches of the group;

If the ranking of one of these teams is determined, the above criteria are consecutively followed until the ranking of all teams is determined. If no ranking can be determined, a decision shall be obtained by EHF through drawing of lots.

== Groups ==
The matchdays were 6–7 September, 13–14 September, 27–28 September, 4–5 October, 25–26 October, 1–2 November, 8–9 November, 15–16 November 2025, 10–11 January, 17–18 January, 24–25 January, 7–8 February, 14–15 February and 21–22 February 2026.

Times up to 23 October 2025 UTC+2, times after are UTC+1.

=== Group A ===
Pos	Team	Pld	W	D	L	GF	GA	GD	Pts	Qualification
1	(Hungary) Győri Audi ETO KC	14	12	0	2	467	363	+104	24 (Note: Győri Audi ETO KC 58–51 Metz Handball)	Quarterfinals
2	(France) Metz Handball	14	12	0	2	453	364	+89	24	Quarterfinals
3	(Denmark) Team Esbjerg	14	9	1	4	462	422	+40	19	Playoffs
4	(Romania) CS Gloria Bistrița	14	8	0	6	420	435	−15	16	Playoffs
5	(Hungary) DVSC Schaeffler	14	6	0	8	408	428	−20	12	Playoffs
6	(Germany) Borussia Dortmund	14	4	0	10	387	449	−62	8	Playoffs
7	(Norway) Storhamar HE	14	3	0	11	371	405	−34	6	
8	(Montenegro) OTP Group Budućnost	14	1	1	12	341	443	−102	3	

Source: EHF
Rules for classification: Tiebreakers
Notes:

6 September 2025; 16:00	CS Gloria Bistrița (Romania)	29–26	(Norway) Storhamar HE	TeraPlast Arena, Bistrița; Attendance: 2,500; Referees: Lidacka, Lesiak (POL)
6 September 2025; 16:00	Fujita 8	(15–12)	Malá 7	TeraPlast Arena, Bistrița; Attendance: 2,500; Referees: Lidacka, Lesiak (POL)
6 September 2025; 16:00	3× (suspension) 1× (red card)	Report	3× (suspension)	TeraPlast Arena, Bistrița; Attendance: 2,500; Referees: Lidacka, Lesiak (POL)

7 September 2025; 14:00	Borussia Dortmund (Germany)	30–43	(Hungary) Győri Audi ETO KC	Helmut-Körnig-Halle, Dortmund; Attendance: 1,100; Referees: Bočáková, Jánošíková (SVK)
7 September 2025; 14:00	Abbingh 7	(15–20)	De Paula, Housheer 7	Helmut-Körnig-Halle, Dortmund; Attendance: 1,100; Referees: Bočáková, Jánošíková (SVK)
7 September 2025; 14:00	4× (suspension)	Report	3× (suspension)	Helmut-Körnig-Halle, Dortmund; Attendance: 1,100; Referees: Bočáková, Jánošíková (SVK)

7 September 2025; 16:00	Team Esbjerg (Denmark)	29–30	(France) Metz Handball	Blue Water Dokken, Esbjerg; Attendance: 1,972; Referees: Cipov, Klus (SVK)
7 September 2025; 16:00	Mørk 8	(15–15)	Vámos 7	Blue Water Dokken, Esbjerg; Attendance: 1,972; Referees: Cipov, Klus (SVK)
7 September 2025; 16:00	1× (yellow card) 4× (suspension)	Report	4× (suspension)	Blue Water Dokken, Esbjerg; Attendance: 1,972; Referees: Cipov, Klus (SVK)

7 September 2025; 16:00	OTP Group Budućnost (Montenegro)	24–25	(Hungary) DVSC Schaeffler	Morača Sports Center, Podgorica; Attendance: 1,000; Referees: Ilieva, Karbeska (MKD)
7 September 2025; 16:00	Grbić 7	(11–10)	Sercien-Ugolin, Tóvizi 5	Morača Sports Center, Podgorica; Attendance: 1,000; Referees: Ilieva, Karbeska (MKD)
7 September 2025; 16:00	2× (suspension)	Report	1× (yellow card) 3× (suspension)	Morača Sports Center, Podgorica; Attendance: 1,000; Referees: Ilieva, Karbeska (MKD)

13 September 2025; 16:00	DVSC Schaeffler (Hungary)	33–34	(Romania) CS Gloria Bistrița	Hódos Imre Sports Hall, Debrecen; Attendance: 1,500; Referees: Budzák, Záhradník (SVK)
13 September 2025; 16:00	Toublanc 11	(15–15)	Fujita, Nüsser 9	Hódos Imre Sports Hall, Debrecen; Attendance: 1,500; Referees: Budzák, Záhradník (SVK)
13 September 2025; 16:00	1× (yellow card) 4× (suspension) 1× (red card)	Report	2× (yellow card) 3× (suspension)	Hódos Imre Sports Hall, Debrecen; Attendance: 1,500; Referees: Budzák, Záhradník (SVK)

13 September 2025; 18:00	Metz Handball (France)	38–29	(Germany) Borussia Dortmund	Arènes de Metz, Metz; Attendance: 3,663; Referees: Fremstad, Jørstad (NOR)
13 September 2025; 18:00	Granier 7	(19–15)	Langer 7	Arènes de Metz, Metz; Attendance: 3,663; Referees: Fremstad, Jørstad (NOR)
13 September 2025; 18:00	3× (suspension)	Report	2× (suspension)	Arènes de Metz, Metz; Attendance: 3,663; Referees: Fremstad, Jørstad (NOR)

13 September 2025; 18:00	Győri Audi ETO KC (Hungary)	31–30	(Denmark) Team Esbjerg	Audi Aréna, Győr; Attendance: 4,125; Referees: Sekulić, Jovandić (SRB)
13 September 2025; 18:00	Housheer 12	(15–15)	Reistad 10	Audi Aréna, Győr; Attendance: 4,125; Referees: Sekulić, Jovandić (SRB)
13 September 2025; 18:00	1× (yellow card) 4× (suspension)	Report	1× (yellow card) 4× (suspension)	Audi Aréna, Győr; Attendance: 4,125; Referees: Sekulić, Jovandić (SRB)

14 September 2025; 16:00	Storhamar HE (Norway)	25–14	(Montenegro) OTP Group Budućnost	OBOS Arena, Hamar; Attendance: 902; Referees: Thiyagarajah, Thiyagarajah (GER)
14 September 2025; 16:00	Obaidli 6	(13–8)	Vukčević 5	OBOS Arena, Hamar; Attendance: 902; Referees: Thiyagarajah, Thiyagarajah (GER)
14 September 2025; 16:00	2× (suspension)	Report	1× (yellow card) 5× (suspension)	OBOS Arena, Hamar; Attendance: 902; Referees: Thiyagarajah, Thiyagarajah (GER)

27 September 2025; 18:00	OTP Group Budućnost (Montenegro)	20–36	(Hungary) Győri Audi ETO KC	Morača Sports Center, Podgorica; Attendance: 1,056; Referees: Backović, Palačković (SLO)
27 September 2025; 18:00	Godeč 5	(6–18)	Fodor 6	Morača Sports Center, Podgorica; Attendance: 1,056; Referees: Backović, Palačković (SLO)
27 September 2025; 18:00	1× (yellow card) 2× (suspension)	Report	1× (yellow card) 5× (suspension)	Morača Sports Center, Podgorica; Attendance: 1,056; Referees: Backović, Palačković (SLO)

28 September 2025; 14:00	Borussia Dortmund (Germany)	28–26	(Hungary) DVSC Schaeffler	Helmut-Körnig-Halle, Dortmund; Attendance: 450; Referees: Barysas, Petrušis (LTU)
28 September 2025; 14:00	Grijseels 9	(17–17)	Sercien-Ugolin 6	Helmut-Körnig-Halle, Dortmund; Attendance: 450; Referees: Barysas, Petrušis (LTU)
28 September 2025; 14:00	1× (yellow card) 2× (suspension)	Report	1× (yellow card) 2× (suspension) 1× (red card)	Helmut-Körnig-Halle, Dortmund; Attendance: 450; Referees: Barysas, Petrušis (LTU)

28 September 2025; 16:00	Team Esbjerg (Denmark)	30–24	(Norway) Storhamar HE	Blue Water Dokken, Esbjerg; Attendance: 2,084; Referees: Metalari, Nikolovski (MKD)
28 September 2025; 16:00	Reistad 9	(17–14)	Hagen 5	Blue Water Dokken, Esbjerg; Attendance: 2,084; Referees: Metalari, Nikolovski (MKD)
28 September 2025; 16:00	2× (suspension)	Report	1× (yellow card) 2× (suspension)	Blue Water Dokken, Esbjerg; Attendance: 2,084; Referees: Metalari, Nikolovski (MKD)

28 September 2025; 16:00	CS Gloria Bistrița (Romania)	24–31	(France) Metz Handball	TeraPlast Arena, Bistrița; Attendance: 2,815; Referees: Vujačić, Kažanegra (MNE)
28 September 2025; 16:00	Fujita 6	(11–14)	Bouktit 7	TeraPlast Arena, Bistrița; Attendance: 2,815; Referees: Vujačić, Kažanegra (MNE)
28 September 2025; 16:00	3× (suspension)	Report	2× (suspension)	TeraPlast Arena, Bistrița; Attendance: 2,815; Referees: Vujačić, Kažanegra (MNE)

4 October 2025; 13:00	Borussia Dortmund (Germany)	22–26	(Norway) Storhamar HE	Helmut-Körnig-Halle, Dortmund; Attendance: 721; Referees: Carmaux, Mursch (FRA)
4 October 2025; 13:00	six players 3	(9–11)	Brandenborg 6	Helmut-Körnig-Halle, Dortmund; Attendance: 721; Referees: Carmaux, Mursch (FRA)
4 October 2025; 13:00	3× (suspension) 1× (red card)	Report	3× (suspension)	Helmut-Körnig-Halle, Dortmund; Attendance: 721; Referees: Carmaux, Mursch (FRA)

4 October 2025; 16:00	DVSC Schaeffler (Hungary)	29–32	(Denmark) Team Esbjerg	Hódos Imre Sports Hall, Debrecen; Attendance: 2,010; Referees: Weijmans, Wolbertus (NED)
4 October 2025; 16:00	Jovović 7	(14–15)	Reistad, Schmid 9	Hódos Imre Sports Hall, Debrecen; Attendance: 2,010; Referees: Weijmans, Wolbertus (NED)
4 October 2025; 16:00	1× (yellow card) 1× (suspension)	Report	2× (suspension)	Hódos Imre Sports Hall, Debrecen; Attendance: 2,010; Referees: Weijmans, Wolbertus (NED)

4 October 2025; 18:00	Metz Handball (France)	38–18	(Montenegro) OTP Group Budućnost	Arènes de Metz, Metz; Attendance: 3,243; Referees: Marton, Dáné (HUN)
4 October 2025; 18:00	Axnér 7	(20–11)	Vukčević 4	Arènes de Metz, Metz; Attendance: 3,243; Referees: Marton, Dáné (HUN)
4 October 2025; 18:00	2× (suspension)	Report	2× (suspension)	Arènes de Metz, Metz; Attendance: 3,243; Referees: Marton, Dáné (HUN)

4 October 2025; 18:00	Győri Audi ETO KC (Hungary)	33–18	(Romania) CS Gloria Bistrița	Audi Aréna, Győr; Attendance: 3,865; Referees: Ilieva, Karbeska (MKD)
4 October 2025; 18:00	Fodor 8	(18–9)	Fujita 4	Audi Aréna, Győr; Attendance: 3,865; Referees: Ilieva, Karbeska (MKD)
4 October 2025; 18:00	1× (yellow card) 4× (suspension)	Report	3× (suspension)	Audi Aréna, Győr; Attendance: 3,865; Referees: Ilieva, Karbeska (MKD)

25 October 2025; 16:00	CS Gloria Bistrița (Romania)	38–35	(Denmark) Team Esbjerg	TeraPlast Arena, Bistrița; Attendance: 2,750; Referees: Konjičanin, Konjičanin (BIH)
25 October 2025; 16:00	Ostase 9	(19–18)	Reistad 9	TeraPlast Arena, Bistrița; Attendance: 2,750; Referees: Konjičanin, Konjičanin (BIH)
25 October 2025; 16:00	2× (suspension)	Report	2× (suspension)	TeraPlast Arena, Bistrița; Attendance: 2,750; Referees: Konjičanin, Konjičanin (BIH)

25 October 2025; 18:00	Storhamar HE (Norway)	24–27	(France) Metz Handball	OBOS Arena, Hamar; Attendance: 964; Referees: Duplii, Pobedrina (UKR)
25 October 2025; 18:00	Obaidli 7	(12–13)	Grandveau 7	OBOS Arena, Hamar; Attendance: 964; Referees: Duplii, Pobedrina (UKR)
25 October 2025; 18:00	3× (suspension)	Report	1× (suspension)	OBOS Arena, Hamar; Attendance: 964; Referees: Duplii, Pobedrina (UKR)

25 October 2025; 18:00	DVSC Schaeffler (Hungary)	30–36	(Hungary) Győri Audi ETO KC	Hódos Imre Sports Hall, Debrecen; Attendance: 2,150; Referees: Fabryczny, Rawicki (POL)
25 October 2025; 18:00	Toublanc 11	(14–19)	Hagman 6	Hódos Imre Sports Hall, Debrecen; Attendance: 2,150; Referees: Fabryczny, Rawicki (POL)
25 October 2025; 18:00	1× (yellow card) 2× (suspension)	Report	1× (yellow card) 2× (suspension)	Hódos Imre Sports Hall, Debrecen; Attendance: 2,150; Referees: Fabryczny, Rawicki (POL)

26 October 2025; 16:00	Borussia Dortmund (Germany)	30–24	(Montenegro) OTP Group Budućnost	Helmut-Körnig-Halle, Dortmund; Attendance: 720; Referees: Lidacka, Lesiak (POL)
26 October 2025; 16:00	Grijseels 6	(13–13)	Despotović 8	Helmut-Körnig-Halle, Dortmund; Attendance: 720; Referees: Lidacka, Lesiak (POL)
26 October 2025; 16:00	3× (suspension)	Report	1× (yellow card) 4× (suspension)	Helmut-Körnig-Halle, Dortmund; Attendance: 720; Referees: Lidacka, Lesiak (POL)

1 November 2025; 16:00	Győri Audi ETO KC (Hungary)	31–27	(France) Metz Handball	Audi Aréna, Győr; Attendance: 4,472; Referees: Hansen, Madsen (DEN)
1 November 2025; 16:00	De Paula 8	(16–8)	Bouktit 7	Audi Aréna, Győr; Attendance: 4,472; Referees: Hansen, Madsen (DEN)
1 November 2025; 16:00	1× (yellow card) 4× (suspension)	Report	2× (suspension)	Audi Aréna, Győr; Attendance: 4,472; Referees: Hansen, Madsen (DEN)

2 November 2025; 14:00	Team Esbjerg (Denmark)	36–29	(Germany) Borussia Dortmund	Blue Water Dokken, Esbjerg; Attendance: 2,165; Referees: Maia, Nunes (POR)
2 November 2025; 14:00	Reistad 8	(24–14)	Lassource, Nestaker 8	Blue Water Dokken, Esbjerg; Attendance: 2,165; Referees: Maia, Nunes (POR)
2 November 2025; 14:00	1× (suspension)	Report	2× (suspension)	Blue Water Dokken, Esbjerg; Attendance: 2,165; Referees: Maia, Nunes (POR)

2 November 2025; 14:00	OTP Group Budućnost (Montenegro)	26–29	(Romania) CS Gloria Bistrița	Morača Sports Center, Podgorica; Attendance: 720; Referees: Mikelić, Parađina (CRO)
2 November 2025; 14:00	Grbić 8	(16–13)	Seraficeanu, So Delgado 7	Morača Sports Center, Podgorica; Attendance: 720; Referees: Mikelić, Parađina (CRO)
2 November 2025; 14:00	1× (yellow card) 2× (suspension)	Report	2× (suspension)	Morača Sports Center, Podgorica; Attendance: 720; Referees: Mikelić, Parađina (CRO)

2 November 2025; 16:00	Storhamar HE (Norway)	28–30	(Hungary) DVSC Schaeffler	OBOS Arena, Hamar; Attendance: 892; Referees: Vujačić, Kažanegra (MNE)
2 November 2025; 16:00	Obaidli 8	(16–15)	Toublanc 6	OBOS Arena, Hamar; Attendance: 892; Referees: Vujačić, Kažanegra (MNE)
2 November 2025; 16:00	1× (yellow card) 2× (suspension)	Report	1× (yellow card) 4× (suspension)	OBOS Arena, Hamar; Attendance: 892; Referees: Vujačić, Kažanegra (MNE)

8 November 2025; 16:00	Győri Audi ETO KC (Hungary)	40–23	(Norway) Storhamar HE	Audi Aréna, Győr; Attendance: 3,722; Referees: Murariu, Chiruță (ROU)
8 November 2025; 16:00	Breistøl, Stanko 7	(21–11)	Vatne 5	Audi Aréna, Győr; Attendance: 3,722; Referees: Murariu, Chiruță (ROU)
8 November 2025; 16:00	3× (suspension)	Report	1× (suspension)	Audi Aréna, Győr; Attendance: 3,722; Referees: Murariu, Chiruță (ROU)

8 November 2025; 20:00	DVSC Schaeffler (Hungary)	30–35	(France) Metz Handball	Hódos Imre Sports Hall, Debrecen; Attendance: 2,200; Referees: Covalciuc, Covalciuc (MDA)
8 November 2025; 20:00	Jovović 6	(14–21)	Bouktit 8	Hódos Imre Sports Hall, Debrecen; Attendance: 2,200; Referees: Covalciuc, Covalciuc (MDA)
8 November 2025; 20:00	1× (suspension)	Report	2× (suspension)	Hódos Imre Sports Hall, Debrecen; Attendance: 2,200; Referees: Covalciuc, Covalciuc (MDA)

9 November 2025; 14:00	Team Esbjerg (Denmark)	36–24	(Montenegro) OTP Group Budućnost	Blue Water Dokken, Esbjerg; Attendance: 1,893; Referees: Bočáková, Jánošíková (SVK)
9 November 2025; 14:00	Møller 6	(18–11)	Kadović 8	Blue Water Dokken, Esbjerg; Attendance: 1,893; Referees: Bočáková, Jánošíková (SVK)
9 November 2025; 14:00	3× (suspension)	Report	4× (suspension)	Blue Water Dokken, Esbjerg; Attendance: 1,893; Referees: Bočáková, Jánošíková (SVK)

9 November 2025; 16:00	CS Gloria Bistrița (Romania)	36–32	(Germany) Borussia Dortmund	TeraPlast Arena, Bistrița; Attendance: 2,800; Referees: Altmár, Horváth (HUN)
9 November 2025; 16:00	So Delgado 11	(18–15)	Nestaker 8	TeraPlast Arena, Bistrița; Attendance: 2,800; Referees: Altmár, Horváth (HUN)
9 November 2025; 16:00	1× (suspension)	Report	5× (suspension)	TeraPlast Arena, Bistrița; Attendance: 2,800; Referees: Altmár, Horváth (HUN)

15 November 2025; 18:00	Metz Handball (France)	33–26	(Hungary) DVSC Schaeffler	Arènes de Metz, Metz; Attendance: 4,124; Referees: Sekulić, Jovandić (SRB)
15 November 2025; 18:00	Bouktit 9	(13–12)	Juhász, Szabó 4	Arènes de Metz, Metz; Attendance: 4,124; Referees: Sekulić, Jovandić (SRB)
15 November 2025; 18:00	1× (yellow card) 1× (suspension)	Report	4× (suspension)	Arènes de Metz, Metz; Attendance: 4,124; Referees: Sekulić, Jovandić (SRB)

16 November 2025; 14:00	Storhamar HE (Norway)	25–32	(Hungary) Győri Audi ETO KC	OBOS Arena, Hamar; Attendance: 1,839; Referees: Gasmi, Gasmi (FRA)
16 November 2025; 14:00	Hagen 5	(10–18)	Hovden 5	OBOS Arena, Hamar; Attendance: 1,839; Referees: Gasmi, Gasmi (FRA)
16 November 2025; 14:00	3× (suspension)	Report	1× (yellow card) 4× (suspension)	OBOS Arena, Hamar; Attendance: 1,839; Referees: Gasmi, Gasmi (FRA)

16 November 2025; 14:00	Borussia Dortmund (Germany)	32–36	(Romania) CS Gloria Bistrița	Helmut-Körnig-Halle, Dortmund; Attendance: 781; Referees: Weijmans, Wolbertus (NED)
16 November 2025; 14:00	Lassource 9	(16–19)	Seraficeanu 10	Helmut-Körnig-Halle, Dortmund; Attendance: 781; Referees: Weijmans, Wolbertus (NED)
16 November 2025; 14:00	3× (suspension)	Report	4× (suspension)	Helmut-Körnig-Halle, Dortmund; Attendance: 781; Referees: Weijmans, Wolbertus (NED)

16 November 2025; 14:00	OTP Group Budućnost (Montenegro)	34–34	(Denmark) Team Esbjerg	Morača Sports Center, Podgorica; Attendance: 550; Referees: Duplii, Pobedrina (UKR)
16 November 2025; 14:00	Vukčević 10	(16–20)	Reistad 9	Morača Sports Center, Podgorica; Attendance: 550; Referees: Duplii, Pobedrina (UKR)
16 November 2025; 14:00	1× (yellow card) 3× (suspension)	Report	5× (suspension)	Morača Sports Center, Podgorica; Attendance: 550; Referees: Duplii, Pobedrina (UKR)

10 January 2026; 16:00	Metz Handball (France)	24–27	(Hungary) Győri Audi ETO KC	Arènes de Metz, Metz; Attendance: 4,935; Referees: Metalari, Nikolovski (MKD)
10 January 2026; 16:00	Bouktit 6	(14–14)	Housheer, Van Wetering 5	Arènes de Metz, Metz; Attendance: 4,935; Referees: Metalari, Nikolovski (MKD)
10 January 2026; 16:00	2× (suspension)	Report	2× (yellow card) 6× (suspension) 1× (red card)	Arènes de Metz, Metz; Attendance: 4,935; Referees: Metalari, Nikolovski (MKD)

10 January 2026; 16:00	CS Gloria Bistrița (Romania)	34–38	(Montenegro) OTP Group Budućnost	TeraPlast Arena, Bistrița; Attendance: 3,000; Referees: Fotakidis, Kinatzidis (GRE)
10 January 2026; 16:00	So Delgado 11	(18–18)	Radivojević 8	TeraPlast Arena, Bistrița; Attendance: 3,000; Referees: Fotakidis, Kinatzidis (GRE)
10 January 2026; 16:00	4× (suspension)	Report	3× (suspension)	TeraPlast Arena, Bistrița; Attendance: 3,000; Referees: Fotakidis, Kinatzidis (GRE)

10 January 2026; 20:00	DVSC Schaeffler (Hungary)	26–24	(Norway) Storhamar HE	Hódos Imre Sports Hall, Debrecen; Attendance: 1,600; Referees: Brkic, Jusufhodzic (AUT)
10 January 2026; 20:00	Hámori 6	(10–13)	Malá, Rivas Toft 5	Hódos Imre Sports Hall, Debrecen; Attendance: 1,600; Referees: Brkic, Jusufhodzic (AUT)
10 January 2026; 20:00	5× (suspension)	Report	3× (suspension)	Hódos Imre Sports Hall, Debrecen; Attendance: 1,600; Referees: Brkic, Jusufhodzic (AUT)

11 January 2026; 14:00	Borussia Dortmund (Germany)	24–31	(Denmark) Team Esbjerg	Westpress Arena, Dortmund; Attendance: 1,112; Referees: Mikelić, Parađina (CRO)
11 January 2026; 14:00	Grijseels, Lassource 5	(10–14)	Møller 5	Westpress Arena, Dortmund; Attendance: 1,112; Referees: Mikelić, Parađina (CRO)
11 January 2026; 14:00	1× (red card)	Report	2× (suspension)	Westpress Arena, Dortmund; Attendance: 1,112; Referees: Mikelić, Parađina (CRO)

17 January 2026; 16:00	OTP Group Budućnost (Montenegro)	22–25	(Germany) Borussia Dortmund	Morača Sports Center, Podgorica; Attendance: 780; Referees: Budzák, Záhradník (SVK)
17 January 2026; 16:00	Vukčević 6	(10–12)	Lassource 5	Morača Sports Center, Podgorica; Attendance: 780; Referees: Budzák, Záhradník (SVK)
17 January 2026; 16:00	6× (suspension) 1× (red card)	Report	4× (suspension)	Morača Sports Center, Podgorica; Attendance: 780; Referees: Budzák, Záhradník (SVK)

17 January 2026; 18:00	Metz Handball (France)	29–27	(Norway) Storhamar HE	Arènes de Metz, Metz; Attendance: 3,602; Referees: Bočáková, Jánošíková (SVK)
17 January 2026; 18:00	Bouktit 10	(17–16)	Aune 7	Arènes de Metz, Metz; Attendance: 3,602; Referees: Bočáková, Jánošíková (SVK)
17 January 2026; 18:00	3× (suspension)	Report	3× (suspension)	Arènes de Metz, Metz; Attendance: 3,602; Referees: Bočáková, Jánošíková (SVK)

17 January 2026; 18:00	Győri Audi ETO KC (Hungary)	30–31	(Hungary) DVSC Schaeffler	Audi Aréna, Győr; Attendance: 3,769; Referees: Duplii, Pobedrina (UKR)
17 January 2026; 18:00	Hovden 7	(16–16)	Toublanc 9	Audi Aréna, Győr; Attendance: 3,769; Referees: Duplii, Pobedrina (UKR)
17 January 2026; 18:00	6× (suspension)	Report	6× (suspension) 1× (red card)	Audi Aréna, Győr; Attendance: 3,769; Referees: Duplii, Pobedrina (UKR)

18 January 2026; 16:00	Team Esbjerg (Denmark)	32–28	(Romania) CS Gloria Bistrița	Blue Water Dokken, Esbjerg; Attendance: 2,049; Referees: Lidacka, Lesiak (POL)
18 January 2026; 16:00	Mørk 8	(17–14)	Ostase 7	Blue Water Dokken, Esbjerg; Attendance: 2,049; Referees: Lidacka, Lesiak (POL)
18 January 2026; 16:00	1× (yellow card) 4× (suspension)	Report	1× (yellow card) 2× (suspension)	Blue Water Dokken, Esbjerg; Attendance: 2,049; Referees: Lidacka, Lesiak (POL)

25 January 2026; 14:00	Storhamar HE (Norway)	30–31	(Germany) Borussia Dortmund	OBOS Arena, Hamar; Attendance: 840; Referees: Fabryczny, Rawicki (POL)
25 January 2026; 14:00	Malá 6	(11–19)	Grijseels 7	OBOS Arena, Hamar; Attendance: 840; Referees: Fabryczny, Rawicki (POL)
25 January 2026; 14:00	1× (suspension)	Report	2× (suspension)	OBOS Arena, Hamar; Attendance: 840; Referees: Fabryczny, Rawicki (POL)

25 January 2026; 14:00	Team Esbjerg (Denmark)	39–30	(Hungary) DVSC Schaeffler	Blue Water Dokken, Esbjerg; Attendance: 1,781; Referees: Kull, Tint (EST)
25 January 2026; 14:00	Reistad 7	(21–12)	Jovović 8	Blue Water Dokken, Esbjerg; Attendance: 1,781; Referees: Kull, Tint (EST)
25 January 2026; 14:00		Report	1× (yellow card) 5× (suspension)	Blue Water Dokken, Esbjerg; Attendance: 1,781; Referees: Kull, Tint (EST)

25 January 2026; 16:00	CS Gloria Bistrița (Romania)	22–27	(Hungary) Győri Audi ETO KC	TeraPlast Arena, Bistrița; Attendance: 3,000; Referees: Praštalo, Balvan (BIH)
25 January 2026; 16:00	Forsberg 6	(12–11)	Housheer 8	TeraPlast Arena, Bistrița; Attendance: 3,000; Referees: Praštalo, Balvan (BIH)
25 January 2026; 16:00	2× (suspension)	Report	2× (yellow card) 3× (suspension)	TeraPlast Arena, Bistrița; Attendance: 3,000; Referees: Praštalo, Balvan (BIH)

25 January 2026; 16:00	OTP Group Budućnost (Montenegro)	23–39	(France) Metz Handball	Morača Sports Center, Podgorica; Attendance: 1,150; Referees: Doychinov, Goretsov (BUL)
25 January 2026; 16:00	Godeč, Kadović 4	(12–22)	Albek, Axnér 8	Morača Sports Center, Podgorica; Attendance: 1,150; Referees: Doychinov, Goretsov (BUL)
25 January 2026; 16:00	1× (suspension)	Report	2× (suspension)	Morača Sports Center, Podgorica; Attendance: 1,150; Referees: Doychinov, Goretsov (BUL)

7 February 2026; 16:00	DVSC Schaeffler (Hungary)	29–23	(Germany) Borussia Dortmund	Hódos Imre Sports Hall, Debrecen; Attendance: 2,000; Referees: Fotakidis, Kinatzidis (GRE)
7 February 2026; 16:00	Toublanc 8	(20–11)	Olsson 6	Hódos Imre Sports Hall, Debrecen; Attendance: 2,000; Referees: Fotakidis, Kinatzidis (GRE)
7 February 2026; 16:00	1× (yellow card) 6× (suspension)	Report	4× (suspension)	Hódos Imre Sports Hall, Debrecen; Attendance: 2,000; Referees: Fotakidis, Kinatzidis (GRE)

7 February 2026; 18:00	Storhamar HE (Norway)	33–39	(Denmark) Team Esbjerg	OBOS Arena, Hamar; Attendance: 1,698; Referees: Simone, Monitillo (ITA)
7 February 2026; 18:00	Obaidli 14	(15–20)	Reistad 15	OBOS Arena, Hamar; Attendance: 1,698; Referees: Simone, Monitillo (ITA)
7 February 2026; 18:00	3× (suspension)	Report	1× (yellow card) 2× (suspension)	OBOS Arena, Hamar; Attendance: 1,698; Referees: Simone, Monitillo (ITA)

7 February 2026; 18:00	Metz Handball (France)	29–26	(Romania) CS Gloria Bistrița	Arènes de Metz, Metz; Attendance: 3,270; Referees: Backović, Palačković (SLO)
7 February 2026; 18:00	Vámos 7	(16–14)	So Delgado 7	Arènes de Metz, Metz; Attendance: 3,270; Referees: Backović, Palačković (SLO)
7 February 2026; 18:00	1× (yellow card) 1× (suspension)	Report	2× (suspension)	Arènes de Metz, Metz; Attendance: 3,270; Referees: Backović, Palačković (SLO)

7 February 2026; 18:00	Győri Audi ETO KC (Hungary)	34–22	(Montenegro) OTP Group Budućnost	Audi Aréna, Győr; Attendance: 3,985; Referees: Lindenbaum, Laron (ISR)
7 February 2026; 18:00	De Paula, Housheer 6	(18–14)	Godeč 11	Audi Aréna, Győr; Attendance: 3,985; Referees: Lindenbaum, Laron (ISR)
7 February 2026; 18:00	2× (yellow card) 2× (suspension)	Report	2× (suspension)	Audi Aréna, Győr; Attendance: 3,985; Referees: Lindenbaum, Laron (ISR)

14 February 2026; 18:00	Team Esbjerg (Denmark)	33–28	(Hungary) Győri Audi ETO KC	Blue Water Dokken, Esbjerg; Attendance: 2,647; Referees: Sirbu, Serdiuc (MDA)
14 February 2026; 18:00	Mørk 13	(21–10)	De Paula 7	Blue Water Dokken, Esbjerg; Attendance: 2,647; Referees: Sirbu, Serdiuc (MDA)
14 February 2026; 18:00	3× (suspension)	Report	1× (yellow card) 3× (suspension)	Blue Water Dokken, Esbjerg; Attendance: 2,647; Referees: Sirbu, Serdiuc (MDA)

15 February 2026; 14:00	Borussia Dortmund (Germany)	24–33	(France) Metz Handball	Westpress Arena, Dortmund; Attendance: 1,119; Referees: Ilieva, Karbeska (MKD)
15 February 2026; 14:00	Vollebregt 6	(12–15)	Grandveau 8	Westpress Arena, Dortmund; Attendance: 1,119; Referees: Ilieva, Karbeska (MKD)
15 February 2026; 14:00	3× (suspension)	Report	1× (yellow card) 3× (suspension)	Westpress Arena, Dortmund; Attendance: 1,119; Referees: Ilieva, Karbeska (MKD)

15 February 2026; 16:00	CS Gloria Bistrița (Romania)	32–31	(Hungary) DVSC Schaeffler	TeraPlast Arena, Bistrița; Attendance: 3,007; Referees: Mikelić, Parađina (CRO)
15 February 2026; 16:00	So Delgado 8	(16–17)	three players 6	TeraPlast Arena, Bistrița; Attendance: 3,007; Referees: Mikelić, Parađina (CRO)
15 February 2026; 16:00	2× (suspension)	Report	1× (yellow card) 5× (suspension) 1× (red card)	TeraPlast Arena, Bistrița; Attendance: 3,007; Referees: Mikelić, Parađina (CRO)

15 February 2026; 16:00	OTP Group Budućnost (Montenegro)	22–26	(Norway) Storhamar HE	Morača Sports Center, Podgorica; Attendance: 500; Referees: Picard, Vauchez (FRA)
15 February 2026; 16:00	Marković 5	(10–16)	Obaidli 7	Morača Sports Center, Podgorica; Attendance: 500; Referees: Picard, Vauchez (FRA)
15 February 2026; 16:00	2× (suspension)	Report	1× (suspension)	Morača Sports Center, Podgorica; Attendance: 500; Referees: Picard, Vauchez (FRA)

22 February 2026; 14:00	Storhamar HE (Norway)	30–34	(Romania) CS Gloria Bistrița	OBOS Arena, Hamar; Attendance: 1,083; Referees: Bozhinovski, Nachevski (MKD)
22 February 2026; 14:00	Obaidli 8	(12–14)	Nüsser, Stoica 7	OBOS Arena, Hamar; Attendance: 1,083; Referees: Bozhinovski, Nachevski (MKD)
22 February 2026; 14:00	3× (suspension)	Report	2× (suspension)	OBOS Arena, Hamar; Attendance: 1,083; Referees: Bozhinovski, Nachevski (MKD)

22 February 2026; 14:00	DVSC Schaeffler (Hungary)	32–30	(Montenegro) OTP Group Budućnost	Hódos Imre Sports Hall, Debrecen; Attendance: 1,800; Referees: Pagh, Thygesen (DEN)
22 February 2026; 14:00	Toublanc 5	(16–16)	Grbić 9	Hódos Imre Sports Hall, Debrecen; Attendance: 1,800; Referees: Pagh, Thygesen (DEN)
22 February 2026; 14:00	5× (suspension)	Report	4× (suspension)	Hódos Imre Sports Hall, Debrecen; Attendance: 1,800; Referees: Pagh, Thygesen (DEN)

22 February 2026; 16:00	Metz Handball (France)	40–26	(Denmark) Team Esbjerg	Arènes de Metz, Metz; Attendance: 3,952; Referees: Thiyagarajah, Thiyagarajah (GER)
22 February 2026; 16:00	Bouktit 9	(16–12)	Reistad 5	Arènes de Metz, Metz; Attendance: 3,952; Referees: Thiyagarajah, Thiyagarajah (GER)
22 February 2026; 16:00	3× (suspension)	Report	1× (suspension)	Arènes de Metz, Metz; Attendance: 3,952; Referees: Thiyagarajah, Thiyagarajah (GER)

22 February 2026; 16:00	Győri Audi ETO KC (Hungary)	39–28	(Germany) Borussia Dortmund	Audi Aréna, Győr; Attendance: 4,011; Referees: Doychinov, Goretsov (BUL)
22 February 2026; 16:00	De Paula 8	(24–17)	Nestaker 6	Audi Aréna, Győr; Attendance: 4,011; Referees: Doychinov, Goretsov (BUL)
22 February 2026; 16:00	3× (suspension)	Report	1× (suspension)	Audi Aréna, Győr; Attendance: 4,011; Referees: Doychinov, Goretsov (BUL)

=== Group B ===
Pos	Team	Pld	W	D	L	GF	GA	GD	Pts	Qualification
1	(France) Brest Bretagne Handball	14	11	0	3	476	414	+62	22	Quarterfinals
2	(Romania) CSM București	14	10	0	4	452	402	+50	20 (Note: CSM București 4 pts, FTC-Rail Cargo Hungaria 0 pts.)	Quarterfinals
3	(Hungary) FTC-Rail Cargo Hungaria	14	10	0	4	428	399	+29	20	Playoffs
4	(Denmark) Odense Håndbold	14	9	1	4	467	421	+46	19	Playoffs
5	(Denmark) Ikast Håndbold	14	8	0	6	425	416	+9	16	Playoffs
6	(Croatia) HC Podravka Vegeta	14	3	1	10	383	445	−62	7	Playoffs
7	(Slovenia) RK Krim Mercator	14	2	1	11	360	424	−64	5	
8	(Norway) Sola HK	14	1	1	12	365	435	−70	3	

Source: EHF
Rules for classification: Tiebreakers
Notes:

6 September 2025; 16:00	FTC-Rail Cargo Hungaria (Hungary)	32–34	(Denmark) Odense Håndbold	ÉRD Aréna, Érd; Attendance: 1,500; Referees: Metalari, Nikolovski (MKD)
6 September 2025; 16:00	Klujber, Vogel 8	(16–18)	Bakkerud 7	ÉRD Aréna, Érd; Attendance: 1,500; Referees: Metalari, Nikolovski (MKD)
6 September 2025; 16:00	1× (yellow card) 3× (suspension)	Report	2× (yellow card) 4× (suspension) 1× (red card)	ÉRD Aréna, Érd; Attendance: 1,500; Referees: Metalari, Nikolovski (MKD)

6 September 2025; 18:00	Brest Bretagne Handball (France)	32–20	(Slovenia) RK Krim Mercator	Brest Arena, Brest; Attendance: 2,656; Referees: Barysas, Petrušis (LTU)
6 September 2025; 18:00	Lott, Ondono 6	(13–9)	A. Abina 4	Brest Arena, Brest; Attendance: 2,656; Referees: Barysas, Petrušis (LTU)
6 September 2025; 18:00	5× (suspension)	Report	5× (suspension)	Brest Arena, Brest; Attendance: 2,656; Referees: Barysas, Petrušis (LTU)

6 September 2025; 18:00	HC Podravka Vegeta (Croatia)	31–26	(Norway) Sola HK	Josip Samardžija-Bepo Arena, Koprivnica; Attendance: 1,500; Referees: Marton, Dáné (HUN)
6 September 2025; 18:00	Pletikosić 13	(15–11)	Knutsen 6	Josip Samardžija-Bepo Arena, Koprivnica; Attendance: 1,500; Referees: Marton, Dáné (HUN)
6 September 2025; 18:00	4× (suspension)	Report	1× (yellow card) 5× (suspension) 1× (red card)	Josip Samardžija-Bepo Arena, Koprivnica; Attendance: 1,500; Referees: Marton, Dáné (HUN)

7 September 2025; 14:00	Ikast Håndbold (Denmark)	28–27	(Romania) CSM București	Ikast-Brande Arena, Ikast; Attendance: 1,513; Referees: Vujačić, Kažanegra (MNE)
7 September 2025; 14:00	Arntzen, Roberts 7	(17–12)	Omoregie 7	Ikast-Brande Arena, Ikast; Attendance: 1,513; Referees: Vujačić, Kažanegra (MNE)
7 September 2025; 14:00	1× (yellow card) 3× (suspension)	Report	5× (suspension)	Ikast-Brande Arena, Ikast; Attendance: 1,513; Referees: Vujačić, Kažanegra (MNE)

13 September 2025; 16:00	Sola HK (Norway)	24–26	(France) Brest Bretagne Handball	Åsenhallen, Sola; Attendance: 784; Referees: Duplii, Pobedrina (UKR)
13 September 2025; 16:00	three players 6	(12–14)	three players 5	Åsenhallen, Sola; Attendance: 784; Referees: Duplii, Pobedrina (UKR)
13 September 2025; 16:00	4× (suspension)	Report	2× (suspension)	Åsenhallen, Sola; Attendance: 784; Referees: Duplii, Pobedrina (UKR)

14 September 2025; 14:00	RK Krim Mercator (Slovenia)	22–27	(Croatia) HC Podravka Vegeta	Tivoli Hall, Ljubljana; Attendance: 1,850; Referees: Covalciuc, Covalciuc (MDA)
14 September 2025; 14:00	Mavsar 6	(11–14)	Pandza 10	Tivoli Hall, Ljubljana; Attendance: 1,850; Referees: Covalciuc, Covalciuc (MDA)
14 September 2025; 14:00	1× (suspension)	Report	4× (suspension)	Tivoli Hall, Ljubljana; Attendance: 1,850; Referees: Covalciuc, Covalciuc (MDA)

14 September 2025; 16:00	Odense Håndbold (Denmark)	35–28	(Denmark) Ikast Håndbold	Sydbank Arena, Odense; Attendance: 2,031; Referees: Praštalo, Balvan (BIH)
14 September 2025; 16:00	Fauske 7	(17–12)	Scaglione 6	Sydbank Arena, Odense; Attendance: 2,031; Referees: Praštalo, Balvan (BIH)
14 September 2025; 16:00	3× (suspension)	Report	1× (suspension)	Sydbank Arena, Odense; Attendance: 2,031; Referees: Praštalo, Balvan (BIH)

14 September 2025; 16:00	CSM București (Romania)	31–28	(Hungary) FTC-Rail Cargo Hungaria	Dinamo Polyvalent Hall, Bucharest; Attendance: 2,100; Referees: Doychinov, Goretsov (BUL)
14 September 2025; 16:00	Omoregie 8	(12–14)	Vogel 7	Dinamo Polyvalent Hall, Bucharest; Attendance: 2,100; Referees: Doychinov, Goretsov (BUL)
14 September 2025; 16:00	1× (yellow card) 2× (suspension)	Report	1× (yellow card) 4× (suspension)	Dinamo Polyvalent Hall, Bucharest; Attendance: 2,100; Referees: Doychinov, Goretsov (BUL)

27 September 2025; 16:00	FTC-Rail Cargo Hungaria (Hungary)	26–25	(Norway) Sola HK	ÉRD Aréna, Érd; Attendance: 1,500; Referees: Cipov, Klus (SVK)
27 September 2025; 16:00	Klujber, Simon 6	(9–14)	Herrem 6	ÉRD Aréna, Érd; Attendance: 1,500; Referees: Cipov, Klus (SVK)
27 September 2025; 16:00	1× (yellow card) 1× (suspension)	Report	1× (yellow card) 6× (suspension)	ÉRD Aréna, Érd; Attendance: 1,500; Referees: Cipov, Klus (SVK)

27 September 2025; 18:00	Brest Bretagne Handball (France)	34–31	(Romania) CSM București	Brest Arena, Brest; Attendance: 3,179; Referees: Brkic, Jusufhodzic (AUT)
27 September 2025; 18:00	Mairot 9	(17–17)	Østergaard 9	Brest Arena, Brest; Attendance: 3,179; Referees: Brkic, Jusufhodzic (AUT)
27 September 2025; 18:00	1× (suspension)	Report	1× (yellow card) 3× (suspension)	Brest Arena, Brest; Attendance: 3,179; Referees: Brkic, Jusufhodzic (AUT)

27 September 2025; 18:00	HC Podravka Vegeta (Croatia)	31–31	(Denmark) Odense Håndbold	Josip Samardžija-Bepo Arena, Koprivnica; Attendance: 1,500; Referees: Simone, Monitillo (ITA)
27 September 2025; 18:00	Pandza 8	(16–16)	Deila 9	Josip Samardžija-Bepo Arena, Koprivnica; Attendance: 1,500; Referees: Simone, Monitillo (ITA)
27 September 2025; 18:00	1× (yellow card) 4× (suspension)	Report	1× (yellow card) 4× (suspension)	Josip Samardžija-Bepo Arena, Koprivnica; Attendance: 1,500; Referees: Simone, Monitillo (ITA)

28 September 2025; 14:00	Ikast Håndbold (Denmark)	27–25	(Slovenia) RK Krim Mercator	Ikast-Brande Arena, Ikast; Attendance: 1,433; Referees: Lidacka, Lesiak (POL)
28 September 2025; 14:00	Skogrand 5	(12–8)	A. Abina 6	Ikast-Brande Arena, Ikast; Attendance: 1,433; Referees: Lidacka, Lesiak (POL)
28 September 2025; 14:00	1× (suspension)	Report	5× (suspension)	Ikast-Brande Arena, Ikast; Attendance: 1,433; Referees: Lidacka, Lesiak (POL)

4 October 2025; 18:00	Sola HK (Norway)	22–31	(Denmark) Ikast Håndbold	Stavanger Idrettshall, Stavanger; Attendance: 978; Referees: Altmár, Horváth (HUN)
4 October 2025; 18:00	Olufsen 7	(15–14)	Nolsøe 7	Stavanger Idrettshall, Stavanger; Attendance: 978; Referees: Altmár, Horváth (HUN)
4 October 2025; 18:00	4× (suspension)	Report	3× (suspension)	Stavanger Idrettshall, Stavanger; Attendance: 978; Referees: Altmár, Horváth (HUN)

5 October 2025; 14:00	RK Krim Mercator (Slovenia)	22–33	(Hungary) FTC-Rail Cargo Hungaria	Tivoli Hall, Ljubljana; Attendance: 1,250; Referees: Duplii, Pobedrina (UKR)
5 October 2025; 14:00	Horacek 7	(12–19)	Vogel 8	Tivoli Hall, Ljubljana; Attendance: 1,250; Referees: Duplii, Pobedrina (UKR)
5 October 2025; 14:00	1× (suspension)	Report	6× (suspension)	Tivoli Hall, Ljubljana; Attendance: 1,250; Referees: Duplii, Pobedrina (UKR)

5 October 2025; 16:00	Odense Håndbold (Denmark)	31–40	(France) Brest Bretagne Handball	Sydbank Arena, Odense; Attendance: 2,232; Referees: Thiyagarajah, Thiyagarajah (GER)
5 October 2025; 16:00	Deila 7	(17–23)	Coatanea, Mairot 6	Sydbank Arena, Odense; Attendance: 2,232; Referees: Thiyagarajah, Thiyagarajah (GER)
5 October 2025; 16:00	2× (yellow card) 3× (suspension) 1× (red card)	Report	5× (suspension)	Sydbank Arena, Odense; Attendance: 2,232; Referees: Thiyagarajah, Thiyagarajah (GER)

5 October 2025; 16:00	CSM București (Romania)	34–24	(Croatia) HC Podravka Vegeta	Dinamo Polyvalent Hall, Bucharest; Attendance: 1,800; Referees: Fabryczny, Rawicki (POL)
5 October 2025; 16:00	Østergaard 8	(16–10)	Pletikosić 5	Dinamo Polyvalent Hall, Bucharest; Attendance: 1,800; Referees: Fabryczny, Rawicki (POL)
5 October 2025; 16:00	5× (suspension)	Report	5× (suspension)	Dinamo Polyvalent Hall, Bucharest; Attendance: 1,800; Referees: Fabryczny, Rawicki (POL)

25 October 2025; 16:00	HC Podravka Vegeta (Croatia)	33–37	(Hungary) FTC-Rail Cargo Hungaria	Josip Samardžija-Bepo Arena, Koprivnica; Attendance: 1,800; Referees: Fremstad, Jørstad (NOR)
25 October 2025; 16:00	Pandza 8	(16–19)	Malestein 7	Josip Samardžija-Bepo Arena, Koprivnica; Attendance: 1,800; Referees: Fremstad, Jørstad (NOR)
25 October 2025; 16:00	3× (suspension)	Report	1× (yellow card) 5× (suspension)	Josip Samardžija-Bepo Arena, Koprivnica; Attendance: 1,800; Referees: Fremstad, Jørstad (NOR)

25 October 2025; 18:00	RK Krim Mercator (Slovenia)	31–27	(Romania) CSM București	Tivoli Hall, Ljubljana; Attendance: 2,590; Referees: Marton, Dáné (HUN)
25 October 2025; 18:00	Horacek 7	(15–11)	Hansen 9	Tivoli Hall, Ljubljana; Attendance: 2,590; Referees: Marton, Dáné (HUN)
25 October 2025; 18:00	1× (yellow card) 4× (suspension)	Report	4× (suspension)	Tivoli Hall, Ljubljana; Attendance: 2,590; Referees: Marton, Dáné (HUN)

26 October 2025; 14:00	Odense Håndbold (Denmark)	32–27	(Norway) Sola HK	Sydbank Arena, Odense; Attendance: 1,934; Referees: Doychinov, Goretsov (BUL)
26 October 2025; 14:00	four players 4	(17–7)	Haugseng 6	Sydbank Arena, Odense; Attendance: 1,934; Referees: Doychinov, Goretsov (BUL)
26 October 2025; 14:00	1× (yellow card)	Report	1× (suspension)	Sydbank Arena, Odense; Attendance: 1,934; Referees: Doychinov, Goretsov (BUL)

26 October 2025; 16:00	Ikast Håndbold (Denmark)	33–36	(France) Brest Bretagne Handball	Ikast-Brande Arena, Ikast; Attendance: 1,549; Referees: Weijmans, Wolbertus (NED)
26 October 2025; 16:00	Skogrand 9	(17–14)	Vyakhireva 12	Ikast-Brande Arena, Ikast; Attendance: 1,549; Referees: Weijmans, Wolbertus (NED)
26 October 2025; 16:00	3× (suspension)	Report	5× (suspension)	Ikast-Brande Arena, Ikast; Attendance: 1,549; Referees: Weijmans, Wolbertus (NED)

1 November 2025; 14:00	Sola HK (Norway)	28–35	(Slovenia) RK Krim Mercator	Terningen Arena, Elverum; Attendance: 960; Referees: Sekulić, Jovandić (SRB)
1 November 2025; 14:00	Knutsen 6	(12–15)	Mavsar 8	Terningen Arena, Elverum; Attendance: 960; Referees: Sekulić, Jovandić (SRB)
1 November 2025; 14:00	2× (suspension)	Report	1× (yellow card) 1× (suspension)	Terningen Arena, Elverum; Attendance: 960; Referees: Sekulić, Jovandić (SRB)

1 November 2025; 18:00	Brest Bretagne Handball (France)	33–25	(Croatia) HC Podravka Vegeta	Brest Arena, Brest; Attendance: 4,193; Referees: Antić, Jakovljević (SRB)
1 November 2025; 18:00	Vyakhireva 7	(15–12)	Šimara 6	Brest Arena, Brest; Attendance: 4,193; Referees: Antić, Jakovljević (SRB)
1 November 2025; 18:00	3× (suspension)	Report	4× (suspension)	Brest Arena, Brest; Attendance: 4,193; Referees: Antić, Jakovljević (SRB)

1 November 2025; 18:00	FTC-Rail Cargo Hungaria (Hungary)	27–24	(Denmark) Ikast Håndbold	ÉRD Aréna, Érd; Attendance: 1,800; Referees: Carmaux, Mursch (FRA)
1 November 2025; 18:00	Klujber, Simon 5	(13–11)	Roberts, Scaglione 5	ÉRD Aréna, Érd; Attendance: 1,800; Referees: Carmaux, Mursch (FRA)
1 November 2025; 18:00		Report	1× (suspension)	ÉRD Aréna, Érd; Attendance: 1,800; Referees: Carmaux, Mursch (FRA)

2 November 2025; 16:00	CSM București (Romania)	30–36	(Denmark) Odense Håndbold	Dinamo Polyvalent Hall, Bucharest; Attendance: 2,300; Referees: Budzák, Záhradník (SVK)
2 November 2025; 16:00	Omoregie 8	(16–16)	Leuchter 8	Dinamo Polyvalent Hall, Bucharest; Attendance: 2,300; Referees: Budzák, Záhradník (SVK)
2 November 2025; 16:00	3× (suspension)	Report	1× (yellow card) 6× (suspension)	Dinamo Polyvalent Hall, Bucharest; Attendance: 2,300; Referees: Budzák, Záhradník (SVK)

8 November 2025; 16:00	RK Krim Mercator (Slovenia)	30–38	(Denmark) Odense Håndbold	Tivoli Hall, Ljubljana; Attendance: 1,810; Referees: Fabryczny, Rawicki (POL)
8 November 2025; 16:00	Horacek 7	(16–23)	Abdulla, Halilcevic 7	Tivoli Hall, Ljubljana; Attendance: 1,810; Referees: Fabryczny, Rawicki (POL)
8 November 2025; 16:00	1× (yellow card) 3× (suspension)	Report	1× (yellow card) 3× (suspension)	Tivoli Hall, Ljubljana; Attendance: 1,810; Referees: Fabryczny, Rawicki (POL)

8 November 2025; 18:00	Sola HK (Norway)	30–38	(Romania) CSM București	Stavanger Idrettshall, Stavanger; Attendance: 935; Referees: Ilieva, Karbeska (MKD)
8 November 2025; 18:00	three players 5	(14–17)	Omoregie, Østergaard 7	Stavanger Idrettshall, Stavanger; Attendance: 935; Referees: Ilieva, Karbeska (MKD)
8 November 2025; 18:00	1× (yellow card) 1× (suspension)	Report	1× (yellow card) 3× (suspension)	Stavanger Idrettshall, Stavanger; Attendance: 935; Referees: Ilieva, Karbeska (MKD)

8 November 2025; 18:00	Brest Bretagne Handball (France)	34–31	(Hungary) FTC-Rail Cargo Hungaria	Brest Arena, Brest; Attendance: 4,212; Referees: Álvarez, Bustamante (ESP)
8 November 2025; 18:00	Vyakhireva 11	(15–14)	Klujber 7	Brest Arena, Brest; Attendance: 4,212; Referees: Álvarez, Bustamante (ESP)
8 November 2025; 18:00	2× (suspension)	Report	1× (yellow card) 3× (suspension)	Brest Arena, Brest; Attendance: 4,212; Referees: Álvarez, Bustamante (ESP)

9 November 2025; 16:00	Ikast Håndbold (Denmark)	36–30	(Croatia) HC Podravka Vegeta	Ikast-Brande Arena, Ikast; Attendance: 954; Referees: Thiyagarajah, Thiyagarajah (GER)
9 November 2025; 16:00	Scaglione 12	(16–13)	Barišić, Mamić 6	Ikast-Brande Arena, Ikast; Attendance: 954; Referees: Thiyagarajah, Thiyagarajah (GER)
9 November 2025; 16:00	1× (yellow card) 4× (suspension) 1× (red card)	Report	3× (suspension)	Ikast-Brande Arena, Ikast; Attendance: 954; Referees: Thiyagarajah, Thiyagarajah (GER)

15 November 2025; 16:00	CSM București (Romania)	34–31	(Norway) Sola HK	Dinamo Polyvalent Hall, Bucharest; Attendance: 2,026; Referees: Jakovljević, Kovačević (SRB)
15 November 2025; 16:00	Hansen, Omoregie 5	(20–12)	Herrem 8	Dinamo Polyvalent Hall, Bucharest; Attendance: 2,026; Referees: Jakovljević, Kovačević (SRB)
15 November 2025; 16:00	1× (yellow card) 2× (suspension)	Report	2× (suspension)	Dinamo Polyvalent Hall, Bucharest; Attendance: 2,026; Referees: Jakovljević, Kovačević (SRB)

15 November 2025; 18:00	HC Podravka Vegeta (Croatia)	29–33	(Denmark) Ikast Håndbold	Josip Samardžija-Bepo Arena, Koprivnica; Attendance: 1,400; Referees: Budzák, Záhradník (SVK)
15 November 2025; 18:00	Pandza 7	(16–14)	Scaglione 10	Josip Samardžija-Bepo Arena, Koprivnica; Attendance: 1,400; Referees: Budzák, Záhradník (SVK)
15 November 2025; 18:00	3× (suspension)	Report	4× (suspension)	Josip Samardžija-Bepo Arena, Koprivnica; Attendance: 1,400; Referees: Budzák, Záhradník (SVK)

16 November 2025; 16:00	Odense Håndbold (Denmark)	30–21	(Slovenia) RK Krim Mercator	Sydbank Arena, Odense; Attendance: 2,112; Referees: Kull, Tint (EST)
16 November 2025; 16:00	Bakkerud, Aagot 5	(11–8)	Horacek 6	Sydbank Arena, Odense; Attendance: 2,112; Referees: Kull, Tint (EST)
16 November 2025; 16:00		Report	1× (yellow card) 2× (suspension)	Sydbank Arena, Odense; Attendance: 2,112; Referees: Kull, Tint (EST)

16 November 2025; 16:00	FTC-Rail Cargo Hungaria (Hungary)	29–28	(France) Brest Bretagne Handball	ÉRD Aréna, Érd; Attendance: 1,500; Referees: Vujačić, Kažanegra (MNE)
16 November 2025; 16:00	Simon 7	(12–18)	Mairot 7	ÉRD Aréna, Érd; Attendance: 1,500; Referees: Vujačić, Kažanegra (MNE)
16 November 2025; 16:00	1× (yellow card)	Report	1× (suspension)	ÉRD Aréna, Érd; Attendance: 1,500; Referees: Vujačić, Kažanegra (MNE)

10 January 2026; 18:00	Ikast Håndbold (Denmark)	27–28	(Hungary) FTC-Rail Cargo Hungaria	Ikast-Brande Arena, Ikast; Attendance: 1,259; Referees: Simone, Monitillo (ITA)
10 January 2026; 18:00	Arntzen, Scaglione 5	(14–15)	Simon 7	Ikast-Brande Arena, Ikast; Attendance: 1,259; Referees: Simone, Monitillo (ITA)
10 January 2026; 18:00	2× (suspension)	Report	1× (yellow card) 5× (suspension) 1× (red card)	Ikast-Brande Arena, Ikast; Attendance: 1,259; Referees: Simone, Monitillo (ITA)

11 January 2026; 14:00	HC Podravka Vegeta (Croatia)	30–31	(France) Brest Bretagne Handball	Josip Samardžija-Bepo Arena, Koprivnica; Attendance: 1,600; Referees: Ilieva, Karbeska (MKD)
11 January 2026; 14:00	Šimara 9	(16–13)	Vyakhireva 11	Josip Samardžija-Bepo Arena, Koprivnica; Attendance: 1,600; Referees: Ilieva, Karbeska (MKD)
11 January 2026; 14:00	2× (yellow card) 3× (suspension)	Report	1× (yellow card) 3× (suspension) 1× (red card)	Josip Samardžija-Bepo Arena, Koprivnica; Attendance: 1,600; Referees: Ilieva, Karbeska (MKD)

11 January 2026; 14:00	RK Krim Mercator (Slovenia)	22–22	(Norway) Sola HK	Arena Stožice, Ljubljana; Attendance: 1,052; Referees: Vujačić, Kažanegra (MNE)
11 January 2026; 14:00	Zaadi 6	(9–10)	Herrem 6	Arena Stožice, Ljubljana; Attendance: 1,052; Referees: Vujačić, Kažanegra (MNE)
11 January 2026; 14:00	1× (yellow card) 2× (suspension)	Report	1× (yellow card) 2× (suspension)	Arena Stožice, Ljubljana; Attendance: 1,052; Referees: Vujačić, Kažanegra (MNE)

11 January 2026; 16:00	Odense Håndbold (Denmark)	24–33	(Romania) CSM București	Sydbank Arena, Odense; Attendance: 2,207; Referees: Antić, Jakovljević (SRB)
11 January 2026; 16:00	Deila 9	(9–15)	Omoregie 6	Sydbank Arena, Odense; Attendance: 2,207; Referees: Antić, Jakovljević (SRB)
11 January 2026; 16:00	1× (yellow card) 4× (suspension)	Report	1× (yellow card) 5× (suspension)	Sydbank Arena, Odense; Attendance: 2,207; Referees: Antić, Jakovljević (SRB)

17 January 2026; 16:00	Sola HK (Norway)	25–40	(Denmark) Odense Håndbold	Stavanger Idrettshall, Stavanger; Attendance: 963; Referees: Marton, Dáné (HUN)
17 January 2026; 16:00	four players 3	(14–20)	Leuchter, Valle Dahl 8	Stavanger Idrettshall, Stavanger; Attendance: 963; Referees: Marton, Dáné (HUN)
17 January 2026; 16:00	1× (suspension)	Report	1× (suspension)	Stavanger Idrettshall, Stavanger; Attendance: 963; Referees: Marton, Dáné (HUN)

17 January 2026; 20:00	Brest Bretagne Handball (France)	35–37	(Denmark) Ikast Håndbold	Brest Arena, Brest; Attendance: 3,838; Referees: Fremstad, Jørstad (NOR)
17 January 2026; 20:00	Vyakhireva 9	(17–17)	Skogrand 10	Brest Arena, Brest; Attendance: 3,838; Referees: Fremstad, Jørstad (NOR)
17 January 2026; 20:00	3× (suspension)	Report	3× (suspension)	Brest Arena, Brest; Attendance: 3,838; Referees: Fremstad, Jørstad (NOR)

18 January 2026; 14:00	CSM București (Romania)	26–20	(Slovenia) RK Krim Mercator	Dinamo Polyvalent Hall, Bucharest; Attendance: 2,200; Referees: Picard, Vauchez (FRA)
18 January 2026; 14:00	Jauković 6	(12–9)	A. Abina, Horacek 4	Dinamo Polyvalent Hall, Bucharest; Attendance: 2,200; Referees: Picard, Vauchez (FRA)
18 January 2026; 14:00	1× (suspension)	Report	2× (suspension)	Dinamo Polyvalent Hall, Bucharest; Attendance: 2,200; Referees: Picard, Vauchez (FRA)

18 January 2026; 16:00	FTC-Rail Cargo Hungaria (Hungary)	31–23	(Croatia) HC Podravka Vegeta	ÉRD Aréna, Érd; Attendance: 1,750; Referees: Sirbu, Serdiuc (MDA)
18 January 2026; 16:00	Simon 7	(15–13)	Šenvald 7	ÉRD Aréna, Érd; Attendance: 1,750; Referees: Sirbu, Serdiuc (MDA)
18 January 2026; 16:00	2× (suspension) 1× (red card)	Report	4× (suspension)	ÉRD Aréna, Érd; Attendance: 1,750; Referees: Sirbu, Serdiuc (MDA)

24 January 2026; 16:00	FTC-Rail Cargo Hungaria (Hungary)	38–31	(Slovenia) RK Krim Mercator	ÉRD Aréna, Érd; Attendance: 2,040; Referees: Jakovljević, Kovačević (SRB)
24 January 2026; 16:00	Klujber 7	(17–16)	A. Abina 7	ÉRD Aréna, Érd; Attendance: 2,040; Referees: Jakovljević, Kovačević (SRB)
24 January 2026; 16:00	1× (yellow card) 2× (suspension)	Report	1× (yellow card) 1× (suspension)	ÉRD Aréna, Érd; Attendance: 2,040; Referees: Jakovljević, Kovačević (SRB)

24 January 2026; 18:00	Brest Bretagne Handball (France)	40–33	(Denmark) Odense Håndbold	Brest Arena, Brest; Attendance: 4,212; Referees: Cipov, Klus (SVK)
24 January 2026; 18:00	Mairot 8	(23–17)	Fauske, Halilcevic 7	Brest Arena, Brest; Attendance: 4,212; Referees: Cipov, Klus (SVK)
24 January 2026; 18:00	6× (suspension)	Report	1× (yellow card) 6× (suspension)	Brest Arena, Brest; Attendance: 4,212; Referees: Cipov, Klus (SVK)

24 January 2026; 18:00	HC Podravka Vegeta (Croatia)	28–33	(Romania) CSM București	Josip Samardžija-Bepo Arena, Koprivnica; Attendance: 1,680; Referees: Weijmans, Wolbertus (NED)
24 January 2026; 18:00	Pletikosić 8	(8–14)	Omoregie 7	Josip Samardžija-Bepo Arena, Koprivnica; Attendance: 1,680; Referees: Weijmans, Wolbertus (NED)
24 January 2026; 18:00	2× (yellow card) 2× (suspension)	Report	2× (yellow card) 6× (suspension)	Josip Samardžija-Bepo Arena, Koprivnica; Attendance: 1,680; Referees: Weijmans, Wolbertus (NED)

25 January 2026; 16:00	Ikast Håndbold (Denmark)	32–23	(Norway) Sola HK	Ikast-Brande Arena, Ikast; Attendance: 1,047; Referees: Bozhinovski, Nachevski (MKD)
25 January 2026; 16:00	three players 6	(15–11)	Grønstad 5	Ikast-Brande Arena, Ikast; Attendance: 1,047; Referees: Bozhinovski, Nachevski (MKD)
25 January 2026; 16:00	3× (suspension)	Report	6× (suspension)	Ikast-Brande Arena, Ikast; Attendance: 1,047; Referees: Bozhinovski, Nachevski (MKD)

7 February 2026; 16:00	RK Krim Mercator (Slovenia)	33–35	(Denmark) Ikast Håndbold	Tivoli Hall, Ljubljana; Attendance: 1,950; Referees: Antić, Jakovljević (SRB)
7 February 2026; 16:00	Mavsar 7	(16–17)	Skogrand 8	Tivoli Hall, Ljubljana; Attendance: 1,950; Referees: Antić, Jakovljević (SRB)
7 February 2026; 16:00	3× (suspension)	Report	1× (yellow card) 2× (suspension)	Tivoli Hall, Ljubljana; Attendance: 1,950; Referees: Antić, Jakovljević (SRB)

8 February 2026; 14:00	Sola HK (Norway)	24–28	(Hungary) FTC-Rail Cargo Hungaria	Åsenhallen, Sola; Attendance: 723; Referees: Fabryczny, Rawicki (POL)
8 February 2026; 14:00	Andersen 6	(12–12)	Malestein 9	Åsenhallen, Sola; Attendance: 723; Referees: Fabryczny, Rawicki (POL)
8 February 2026; 14:00	1× (yellow card) 1× (suspension)	Report	1× (yellow card) 4× (suspension)	Åsenhallen, Sola; Attendance: 723; Referees: Fabryczny, Rawicki (POL)

8 February 2026; 16:00	Odense Håndbold (Denmark)	42–24	(Croatia) HC Podravka Vegeta	Sydbank Arena, Odense; Attendance: 2,146; Referees: Maia, Nunes (POR)
8 February 2026; 16:00	Halilcevic 9	(20–10)	Pletikosić 7	Sydbank Arena, Odense; Attendance: 2,146; Referees: Maia, Nunes (POR)
8 February 2026; 16:00	4× (suspension)	Report	6× (suspension)	Sydbank Arena, Odense; Attendance: 2,146; Referees: Maia, Nunes (POR)

8 February 2026; 16:00	CSM București (Romania)	40–34	(France) Brest Bretagne Handball	Dinamo Polyvalent Hall, Bucharest; Attendance: 3,500; Referees: Metalari, Nikolovski (MKD)
8 February 2026; 16:00	Omoregie 9	(21–17)	Vyakhireva 14	Dinamo Polyvalent Hall, Bucharest; Attendance: 3,500; Referees: Metalari, Nikolovski (MKD)
8 February 2026; 16:00	1× (yellow card) 6× (suspension) 1× (red card)	Report	1× (yellow card) 4× (suspension)	Dinamo Polyvalent Hall, Bucharest; Attendance: 3,500; Referees: Metalari, Nikolovski (MKD)

14 February 2026; 16:00	FTC-Rail Cargo Hungaria (Hungary)	30–35	(Romania) CSM București	ÉRD Aréna, Érd; Attendance: 2,200; Referees: Sekulić, Jovandić (SRB)
14 February 2026; 16:00	Dmitrieva 9	(15–17)	three players 6	ÉRD Aréna, Érd; Attendance: 2,200; Referees: Sekulić, Jovandić (SRB)
14 February 2026; 16:00	1× (yellow card) 4× (suspension)	Report	1× (yellow card) 3× (suspension)	ÉRD Aréna, Érd; Attendance: 2,200; Referees: Sekulić, Jovandić (SRB)

14 February 2026; 18:00	Brest Bretagne Handball (France)	36–25	(Norway) Sola HK	Brest Arena, Brest; Attendance: 4,100; Referees: Murariu, Chiruta (ROU)
14 February 2026; 18:00	Foppa, Gros 7	(19–12)	four players 4	Brest Arena, Brest; Attendance: 4,100; Referees: Murariu, Chiruta (ROU)
14 February 2026; 18:00	1× (suspension)	Report	1× (yellow card) 2× (suspension)	Brest Arena, Brest; Attendance: 4,100; Referees: Murariu, Chiruta (ROU)

14 February 2026; 18:00	HC Podravka Vegeta (Croatia)	24–23	(Slovenia) RK Krim Mercator	Josip Samardžija-Bepo Arena, Koprivnica; Attendance: 1,800; Referees: Cipov, Klus (SVK)
14 February 2026; 18:00	three players 4	(15–11)	Mavsar 7	Josip Samardžija-Bepo Arena, Koprivnica; Attendance: 1,800; Referees: Cipov, Klus (SVK)
14 February 2026; 18:00	1× (yellow card) 5× (suspension) 1× (red card)	Report	1× (yellow card) 4× (suspension) 1× (red card)	Josip Samardžija-Bepo Arena, Koprivnica; Attendance: 1,800; Referees: Cipov, Klus (SVK)

15 February 2026; 16:00	Ikast Håndbold (Denmark)	30–33	(Denmark) Odense Håndbold	Ikast-Brande Arena, Ikast; Attendance: 1,391; Referees: Duplii, Pobedrina (UKR)
15 February 2026; 16:00	Scaglione 9	(16–14)	Fauske, Halilcevic 5	Ikast-Brande Arena, Ikast; Attendance: 1,391; Referees: Duplii, Pobedrina (UKR)
15 February 2026; 16:00	2× (suspension)	Report	4× (suspension)	Ikast-Brande Arena, Ikast; Attendance: 1,391; Referees: Duplii, Pobedrina (UKR)

21 February 2026; 16:00	CSM București (Romania)	33–24	(Denmark) Ikast Håndbold	Dinamo Polyvalent Hall, Bucharest; Attendance: 3,970; Referees: Lidacka, Lesiak (POL)
21 February 2026; 16:00	Maslova 7	(15–7)	Scaglione 7	Dinamo Polyvalent Hall, Bucharest; Attendance: 3,970; Referees: Lidacka, Lesiak (POL)
21 February 2026; 16:00	1× (yellow card) 4× (suspension)	Report	3× (suspension)	Dinamo Polyvalent Hall, Bucharest; Attendance: 3,970; Referees: Lidacka, Lesiak (POL)

21 February 2026; 16:00	RK Krim Mercator (Slovenia)	25–37	(France) Brest Bretagne Handball	Tivoli Hall, Ljubljana; Attendance: 1,450; Referees: Praštalo, Balvan (BIH)
21 February 2026; 16:00	Mavsar 8	(10–18)	Gros 7	Tivoli Hall, Ljubljana; Attendance: 1,450; Referees: Praštalo, Balvan (BIH)
21 February 2026; 16:00	3× (suspension)	Report	4× (suspension)	Tivoli Hall, Ljubljana; Attendance: 1,450; Referees: Praštalo, Balvan (BIH)

21 February 2026; 18:00	Sola HK (Norway)	33–24	(Croatia) HC Podravka Vegeta	Stavanger Idrettshall, Stavanger; Attendance: 1,050; Referees: Fotakidis, Kinatzidis (GRE)
21 February 2026; 18:00	Andersen 6	(17–12)	Vuković 5	Stavanger Idrettshall, Stavanger; Attendance: 1,050; Referees: Fotakidis, Kinatzidis (GRE)
21 February 2026; 18:00	4× (suspension)	Report	1× (yellow card) 4× (suspension)	Stavanger Idrettshall, Stavanger; Attendance: 1,050; Referees: Fotakidis, Kinatzidis (GRE)

21 February 2026; 18:00	Odense Håndbold (Denmark)	28–30	(Hungary) FTC-Rail Cargo Hungaria	Sydbank Arena, Odense; Attendance: 2,207; Referees: Lindenbaum, Laron (ISR)
21 February 2026; 18:00	Halilcevic, Højlund 6	(15–17)	Simon 8	Sydbank Arena, Odense; Attendance: 2,207; Referees: Lindenbaum, Laron (ISR)
21 February 2026; 18:00	1× (yellow card) 2× (suspension)	Report	1× (yellow card) 4× (suspension)	Sydbank Arena, Odense; Attendance: 2,207; Referees: Lindenbaum, Laron (ISR)
