= 2025–26 Women's EHF Champions League knockout stage =

Handball tournament

The 2025–26 Women's EHF Champions League knockout stage began on 21 March with the playoffs and ended on 7 June 2026 with the final at the MVM Dome in Budapest, Hungary, to decide the winners of the 2025–26 Women's EHF Champions League. A total of twelve teams competed in the knockout phase.

== Format ==
In the playoffs, the eight teams ranked 3rd–6th in Groups A and B played against each other in two-legged home-and-away matches. The four winning teams advanced to the quarterfinals, where they were joined by the top-two teams of Groups A and B for another round of two-legged home-and-away matches. The four quarterfinal winners qualified for the final four tournament at the MVM Dome in Budapest, Hungary.

== Qualified teams ==
The top six teams from Groups A and B qualified for the knockout stage.

Group	Qualified for quarterfinals		Qualified for playoffs			
Group	First place	Second place	Third place	Fourth place	Fifth place	Sixth place
A	(Hungary) Győri Audi ETO KC	(France) Metz Handball	(Denmark) Team Esbjerg	(Romania) CS Gloria Bistrița	(Hungary) DVSC Schaeffler	(Germany) Borussia Dortmund
B	(France) Brest Bretagne Handball	(Romania) CSM București	(Hungary) FTC-Rail Cargo Hungaria	(Denmark) Odense Håndbold	(Denmark) Ikast Håndbold	(Croatia) HC Podravka Vegeta

== Playoffs ==
=== Overview ===
Team 1	Agg.	Team 2	1st leg	2nd leg
HC Podravka Vegeta (Croatia)	55–68	(Denmark) Team Esbjerg	26–37	29–31
Borussia Dortmund (Germany)	52–58	(Hungary) FTC-Rail Cargo Hungaria	25–31	27–27
Ikast Håndbold (Denmark)	62–72	(Romania) CS Gloria Bistrița	34–35	28–37
DVSC Schaeffler (Hungary)	66–71	(Denmark) Odense Håndbold	32–37	34–34

==== Matches ====
21 March 2026; 16:00	HC Podravka Vegeta (Croatia)	26–37	(Denmark) Team Esbjerg	Josip Samardžija-Bepo Arena, Koprivnica; Attendance: 1,921; Referees: Altmár, Horváth (HUN)
21 March 2026; 16:00	Pletikosić 6	(13–19)	Reistad 11	Josip Samardžija-Bepo Arena, Koprivnica; Attendance: 1,921; Referees: Altmár, Horváth (HUN)
21 March 2026; 16:00	1× (yellow card) 4× (suspension)	Report	1× (yellow card) 4× (suspension)	Josip Samardžija-Bepo Arena, Koprivnica; Attendance: 1,921; Referees: Altmár, Horváth (HUN)

29 March 2026; 14:00	Team Esbjerg (Denmark)	31–29	(Croatia) HC Podravka Vegeta	Blue Water Dokken, Esbjerg; Attendance: 1,811; Referees: Doychinov, Goretsov (BUL)
29 March 2026; 14:00	Hansson 9	(15–16)	Šenvald 9	Blue Water Dokken, Esbjerg; Attendance: 1,811; Referees: Doychinov, Goretsov (BUL)
29 March 2026; 14:00	2× (suspension)	Report	1× (suspension)	Blue Water Dokken, Esbjerg; Attendance: 1,811; Referees: Doychinov, Goretsov (BUL)

Team Esbjerg won 68–55 on aggregate.

22 March 2026; 14:00	Borussia Dortmund (Germany)	25–31	(Hungary) FTC-Rail Cargo Hungaria	Westpress Arena, Hamm; Attendance: 854; Referees: Duplii, Pobedrina (UKR)
22 March 2026; 14:00	Egeling 8	(10–13)	Simon 8	Westpress Arena, Hamm; Attendance: 854; Referees: Duplii, Pobedrina (UKR)
22 March 2026; 14:00		Report	1× (suspension)	Westpress Arena, Hamm; Attendance: 854; Referees: Duplii, Pobedrina (UKR)

28 March 2026; 16:00	FTC-Rail Cargo Hungaria (Hungary)	27–27	(Germany) Borussia Dortmund	ÉRD Aréna, Érd; Attendance: 1,700; Referees: Bočáková, Jánošíková (SVK)
28 March 2026; 16:00	Simon 9	(12–12)	Grijseels 8	ÉRD Aréna, Érd; Attendance: 1,700; Referees: Bočáková, Jánošíková (SVK)
28 March 2026; 16:00	3× (suspension)	Report	1× (yellow card) 4× (suspension) 1× (red card)	ÉRD Aréna, Érd; Attendance: 1,700; Referees: Bočáková, Jánošíková (SVK)

FTC-Rail Cargo Hungaria won 58–52 on aggregate.

22 March 2026; 16:00	Ikast Håndbold (Denmark)	34–35	(Romania) CS Gloria Bistrița	Ikast-Brande Arena, Ikast; Attendance: 1,221; Referees: Praštalo, Balvan (BIH)
22 March 2026; 16:00	Skogrand 10	(21–16)	So Delgado 11	Ikast-Brande Arena, Ikast; Attendance: 1,221; Referees: Praštalo, Balvan (BIH)
22 March 2026; 16:00	4× (suspension)	Report	2× (suspension) 1× (red card)	Ikast-Brande Arena, Ikast; Attendance: 1,221; Referees: Praštalo, Balvan (BIH)

28 March 2026; 18:00	CS Gloria Bistrița (Romania)	37–28	(Denmark) Ikast Håndbold	TeraPlast Arena, Bistrița; Attendance: 3,007; Referees: Cipov, Klus (SVK)
28 March 2026; 18:00	So Delgado 14	(16–15)	Roberts 7	TeraPlast Arena, Bistrița; Attendance: 3,007; Referees: Cipov, Klus (SVK)
28 March 2026; 18:00	2× (suspension)	Report	2× (yellow card) 2× (suspension)	TeraPlast Arena, Bistrița; Attendance: 3,007; Referees: Cipov, Klus (SVK)

CS Gloria Bistrița won 72–62 on aggregate.

21 March 2026; 18:00	DVSC Schaeffler (Hungary)	32–37	(Denmark) Odense Håndbold	Hódos Imre Sports Hall, Debrecen; Attendance: 1,800; Referees: Picard, Vauchez (FRA)
21 March 2026; 18:00	Ivančok-Šoltić 5	(13–18)	Fauske 8	Hódos Imre Sports Hall, Debrecen; Attendance: 1,800; Referees: Picard, Vauchez (FRA)
21 March 2026; 18:00	1× (yellow card) 4× (suspension)	Report	1× (yellow card) 3× (suspension)	Hódos Imre Sports Hall, Debrecen; Attendance: 1,800; Referees: Picard, Vauchez (FRA)

29 March 2026; 16:00	Odense Håndbold (Denmark)	34–34	(Hungary) DVSC Schaeffler	Sydbank Arena, Odense; Attendance: 2,177; Referees: Weijmans, Wolbertus (NED)
29 March 2026; 16:00	Deila 9	(13–16)	Tóvizi 6	Sydbank Arena, Odense; Attendance: 2,177; Referees: Weijmans, Wolbertus (NED)
29 March 2026; 16:00	1× (suspension)	Report	3× (suspension)	Sydbank Arena, Odense; Attendance: 2,177; Referees: Weijmans, Wolbertus (NED)

Odense Håndbold won 71–66 on aggregate.

== Quarterfinals ==
=== Overview ===
Team 1	Agg.	Team 2	1st leg	2nd leg
Odense Håndbold (Denmark)	53–76	(Hungary) Győri Audi ETO KC	28–36	25–40
CS Gloria Bistrița (Romania)	65–72	(France) Brest Bretagne Handball	35–36	30–36
FTC-Rail Cargo Hungaria (Hungary)	59–62	(France) Metz Handball	31–31	28–31
Team Esbjerg (Denmark)	53–62	(Romania) CSM București	26–25	27–37

==== Matches ====
19 April 2026; 16:00	Odense Håndbold (Denmark)	28–36	(Hungary) Győri Audi ETO KC	Sydbank Arena, Odense; Attendance: 2,243; Referees: Ilieva, Karbeska (MKD)
19 April 2026; 16:00	Leuchter 5	(15–16)	Housheer 10	Sydbank Arena, Odense; Attendance: 2,243; Referees: Ilieva, Karbeska (MKD)
19 April 2026; 16:00	2× (yellow card) 1× (suspension)	Report	4× (suspension)	Sydbank Arena, Odense; Attendance: 2,243; Referees: Ilieva, Karbeska (MKD)

25 April 2026; 16:00	Győri Audi ETO KC (Hungary)	40–25	(Denmark) Odense Håndbold	Audi Aréna, Győr; Attendance: 4,723; Referees: Covalciuc, Covalciuc (MDA)
25 April 2026; 16:00	Housheer, Jørgensen 7	(17–8)	Højlund, Van der Vliet 4	Audi Aréna, Győr; Attendance: 4,723; Referees: Covalciuc, Covalciuc (MDA)
25 April 2026; 16:00	1× (suspension)	Report	4× (suspension)	Audi Aréna, Győr; Attendance: 4,723; Referees: Covalciuc, Covalciuc (MDA)

Győri Audi ETO KC won 76–53 on aggregate.

18 April 2026; 16:00	CS Gloria Bistrița (Romania)	35–36	(France) Brest Bretagne Handball	TeraPlast Arena, Bistrița; Attendance: 2,966; Referees: Fremstad, Jørstad (NOR)
18 April 2026; 16:00	So Delgado 8	(17–19)	Ondono 7	TeraPlast Arena, Bistrița; Attendance: 2,966; Referees: Fremstad, Jørstad (NOR)
18 April 2026; 16:00	2× (suspension)	Report	6× (suspension)	TeraPlast Arena, Bistrița; Attendance: 2,966; Referees: Fremstad, Jørstad (NOR)

26 April 2026; 18:00	Brest Bretagne Handball (France)	36–30	(Romania) CS Gloria Bistrița	Brest Arena, Brest; Attendance: 4,324; Referees: Antić, Jakovljević (SRB)
26 April 2026; 18:00	Vyakhireva 8	(14–13)	So Delgado 9	Brest Arena, Brest; Attendance: 4,324; Referees: Antić, Jakovljević (SRB)
26 April 2026; 18:00	1× (yellow card) 5× (suspension)	Report	3× (suspension)	Brest Arena, Brest; Attendance: 4,324; Referees: Antić, Jakovljević (SRB)

Brest Bretagne Handball won 72–65 on aggregate.

19 April 2026; 14:00	FTC-Rail Cargo Hungaria (Hungary)	31–31	(France) Metz Handball	ÉRD Aréna, Érd; Attendance: 1,800; Referees: Mikelić, Parađina (CRO)
19 April 2026; 14:00	Bölk 7	(14–15)	Bouktit 9	ÉRD Aréna, Érd; Attendance: 1,800; Referees: Mikelić, Parađina (CRO)
19 April 2026; 14:00	1× (yellow card) 1× (suspension)	Report	5× (suspension)	ÉRD Aréna, Érd; Attendance: 1,800; Referees: Mikelić, Parađina (CRO)

25 April 2026; 18:00	Metz Handball (France)	31–28	(Hungary) FTC-Rail Cargo Hungaria	Arènes de Metz, Metz; Attendance: 4,704; Referees: Lidacka, Lesiak (POL)
25 April 2026; 18:00	Axnér 8	(18–12)	Simon 11	Arènes de Metz, Metz; Attendance: 4,704; Referees: Lidacka, Lesiak (POL)
25 April 2026; 18:00	1× (yellow card) 1× (suspension)	Report	6× (suspension)	Arènes de Metz, Metz; Attendance: 4,704; Referees: Lidacka, Lesiak (POL)

Metz Handball won 62–59 on aggregate.

18 April 2026; 18:00	Team Esbjerg (Denmark)	26–25	(Romania) CSM București	Blue Water Dokken, Esbjerg; Attendance: 2,200; Referees: Backović, Palačković (SLO)
18 April 2026; 18:00	Reistad 9	(14–13)	Omoregie 7	Blue Water Dokken, Esbjerg; Attendance: 2,200; Referees: Backović, Palačković (SLO)
18 April 2026; 18:00	2× (yellow card) 4× (suspension)	Report	1× (yellow card) 3× (suspension)	Blue Water Dokken, Esbjerg; Attendance: 2,200; Referees: Backović, Palačković (SLO)

26 April 2026; 16:00	CSM București (Romania)	37–27	(Denmark) Team Esbjerg	Dinamo Polyvalent Hall, Bucharest; Attendance: 5,000; Referees: Barysas, Petrušis (LTU)
26 April 2026; 16:00	Omoregie, Østergaard 6	(19–14)	Hansson, Reistad 6	Dinamo Polyvalent Hall, Bucharest; Attendance: 5,000; Referees: Barysas, Petrušis (LTU)
26 April 2026; 16:00	1× (suspension)	Report	1× (yellow card) 3× (suspension)	Dinamo Polyvalent Hall, Bucharest; Attendance: 5,000; Referees: Barysas, Petrušis (LTU)

CSM București won 62–53 on aggregate.

== Final four ==
The final four was at the MVM Dome in Budapest, Hungary on 6 and 7 June 2026. The draw was held on 27 April 2026.

=== Bracket ===
Semi-finals
6 June
(France) Brest Bretagne Handball	30
(Hungary) Győri Audi ETO KC	31
6 June
(France) Metz Handball	32
(Romania) CSM București	27

Final
7 June
(Hungary) Győri Audi ETO KC	29
(France) Metz Handball	31
Third place
7 June
(France) Brest Bretagne Handball	26
(Romania) CSM București	32

=== Semifinals ===
6 June 2026; 15:00	Metz Handball (France)	32–27	(Romania) CSM București	MVM Dome, Budapest; Attendance: 18,500; Referees: Hansen, Madsen (DEN)
6 June 2026; 15:00	Bouktit 8	(17–13)	Maslova 7	MVM Dome, Budapest; Attendance: 18,500; Referees: Hansen, Madsen (DEN)
6 June 2026; 15:00		Report	1× (yellow card) 2× (suspension)	MVM Dome, Budapest; Attendance: 18,500; Referees: Hansen, Madsen (DEN)

6 June 2026; 18:00	Brest Bretagne Handball (France)	30–31	(Hungary) Győri Audi ETO KC	MVM Dome, Budapest; Attendance: 19,850; Referees: Praštalo, Balvan (BIH)
6 June 2026; 18:00	Vyakhireva 7	(16–17)	Housheer 9	MVM Dome, Budapest; Attendance: 19,850; Referees: Praštalo, Balvan (BIH)
6 June 2026; 18:00	6× (suspension) 2× (red card)	Report	2× (yellow card) 4× (suspension) 1× (red card)	MVM Dome, Budapest; Attendance: 19,850; Referees: Praštalo, Balvan (BIH)

=== Third place game ===
7 June 2026; 15:00	Brest Bretagne Handball (France)	26−32	(Romania) CSM București	MVM Dome, Budapest; Attendance: 19,500; Referees: Cipov, Klus (SVK)
7 June 2026; 15:00	Mairot 11	(13–15)	Omoregie 8	MVM Dome, Budapest; Attendance: 19,500; Referees: Cipov, Klus (SVK)
7 June 2026; 15:00	2× (suspension)	Report	2× (suspension) 1× (red card)	MVM Dome, Budapest; Attendance: 19,500; Referees: Cipov, Klus (SVK)

=== Final ===
7 June 2026; 18:00	Győri Audi ETO KC (Hungary)	29–31	(France) Metz Handball	MVM Dome, Budapest; Attendance: 22,022; Referees: Antić, Jakovljević (SRB)
7 June 2026; 18:00	De Paula 7	(17–18)	Bouktit 12	MVM Dome, Budapest; Attendance: 22,022; Referees: Antić, Jakovljević (SRB)
7 June 2026; 18:00	4× (suspension) 1× (red card)	Report	3× (suspension)	MVM Dome, Budapest; Attendance: 22,022; Referees: Antić, Jakovljević (SRB)
