= 2025–26 Women's EHF Champions League =

European handball tournament

Women's EHF Champions League
- 2025–26

Tournament information
- Sport: Handball
- Dates: 6 September 2025–7 June 2026
- Teams: 16
- Website: ehfcl.com

Final positions
- Champions: (France) Metz Handball
- Runner-up: (Hungary) Győri Audi ETO KC

Tournament statistics
- Matches played: 132
- Goals scored: 7899 (59.84 per match)
- Attendance: 352,437 (2,670 per match)
- MVP: (France) Sarah Bouktit
- Top scorer(s): (Norway) Henny Reistad (131 goals)

The 2025–26 Women's EHF Champions League was the 33rd edition of Europe's premier club handball tournament, running from 6 September 2025 to 7 June 2026.

Győri Audi ETO KC were the defending champions but lost in the final to Metz Handball, who won their first title.

== Format ==
The tournament used the same format as the previous seasons. The competition began with a group stage featuring sixteen teams divided into two groups. Matches were played in a double round-robin system with home-and-away fixtures, fourteen in total for each team. In Groups A and B, the top two teams automatically qualified for the quarter-finals, with teams ranked third to sixth entered the playoff round.

The knockout stage included four rounds: the playoffs, quarter-finals, and a final-four tournament comprising two semifinals and the final. In the playoffs, eight teams were paired against each other in two-legged home-and-away matches (third-placed in group A played sixth-placed group B; fourth-placed group A played fifth-placed group B, etc.). The four aggregate winners of the playoffs advanced to the quarterfinals, joining the top-two teams of Groups A and B. The eight quarterfinalist teams were paired against each other in two-legged home-and-away matches, with the four aggregate winners qualifying to the final-four tournament.

In the final four tournament, the semifinals and the final were played as single matches at a pre-selected host venue.

== Rankings ==
The rankings were based on the performances from the three most recent seasons.

- Associations 1–9 had their league champion qualify for the group stage and could have applied up to two wildcards.
- The best-ranked association in the Women's EHF European League could have its league champion and runner-up qualified for the group stage and could have applied for one wildcard.
- Associations below the top 9 could have their league champion apply for a wildcard.

Rank	Association	Average points	Teams
1	Hungary	210.33	3
2	Norway	198.33	2
3	Denmark	154.67	3
4	France	143.33	2
5	Romania	113.00	2
6	Russia	113.00	0
7	Germany	99.33	1
8	Slovenia	86.33	1
9	Montenegro	46.67	1

Rank	Association	Average points	Teams
10	Sweden	29.00	0
11	Turkey	27.50	0
12	Croatia	27.50	1
13	Poland	26.00	0
14	Czech Republic	26.00	0
15	All other associations	0.00	0

== Teams ==
19 teams applied for a place, with nine having a fixed place. The final list was announced on 24 June 2025.

The fixed place for Russia was vacant since the country and its clubs were not admitted to participate in the EHF competitions due to the Russian invasion of Ukraine.

On 5 August 2025, after previously monitoring HB Ludwigsburg's financial situation, the EHF decided to disqualify them after they failed to raise enough funds to play in the Champions League. They would be replaced by Sola HK.

Participating teams
Entry round	Teams			
Fixed spots	(Hungary) Győri Audi ETO KC (1st)	(Norway) Storhamar HE (1st)	(Denmark) Team Esbjerg (2nd)	(Denmark) Odense Håndbold (1st)
Fixed spots	(France) Metz Handball (1st)	(Romania) CSM București (1st)	(Slovenia) RK Krim Mercator (1st)	(Montenegro) OTP Group Budućnost (1st)
Wildcards	(Hungary) FTC-Rail Cargo Hungaria (2nd)	(Hungary) DVSC Schaeffler (4th)	(Norway) Sola HK (2nd)	(Denmark) Ikast Håndbold (3rd)
Wildcards	(France) Brest Bretagne Handball (2nd)	(Romania) CS Gloria Bistrița (3rd)	(Germany) Borussia Dortmund (2nd)	(Croatia) HC Podravka Vegeta (1st)

Rejected upgrades
(Norway) Tertnes HE (5th)	(Romania) CS Minaur Baia Mare (4th)

Withdrawn
(Germany) HB Ludwigsburg (1st)

== Group stage ==
Location of teams of the 2025–26 Women's EHF Champions League group stage.
Red: Group A; Blue: Group B.

The 16 teams were drawn into two groups of eight. The draw took place on 27 June 2025.

In the group stage, teams were ranked according to points (2 points for a win, 1 point for a draw, 0 points for a loss). After completion of the group stage, if two or more teams have scored the same number of points, the ranking was determined as follows:

1. Highest number of points in matches between the teams directly involved;
2. Superior goal difference in matches between the teams directly involved;
3. Highest number of goals scored in matches between the teams directly involved;
4. Superior goal difference in all matches of the group;
5. Highest number of plus goals in all matches of the group;
6. Drawing of Lots

This season, nine national associations are present. Sola HK will make their debut this season. Borussia Dortmund made their return to the Champions League for the first time since 2021–22. Ikast Håndbold and DVSC Schaeffler return after a one edition absence.

=== Group A ===
Pos	Team	Pld	W	D	L	GF	GA	GD	Pts	Qualification	GYO	MET	ESB	BIS	DEB	DOR	STO	BUD
1	(Hungary) Győri Audi ETO KC	14	12	0	2	467	363	+104	24 (Note: Győri Audi ETO KC 58–51 Metz Handball)	Quarterfinals	—	31–27	31–30	33–18	30–31	39–28	40–23	34–22
2	(France) Metz Handball	14	12	0	2	453	364	+89	24	Quarterfinals	24–27	—	40–26	29–26	33–26	38–29	29–27	38–18
3	(Denmark) Team Esbjerg	14	9	1	4	462	422	+40	19	Playoffs	33–28	29–30	—	32–28	39–30	36–29	30–24	36–24
4	(Romania) CS Gloria Bistrița	14	8	0	6	420	435	−15	16	Playoffs	22–27	24–31	38–35	—	32–31	36–32	29–26	34–38
5	(Hungary) DVSC Schaeffler	14	6	0	8	408	428	−20	12	Playoffs	30–36	30–35	29–32	33–34	—	29–23	26–24	30–34
6	(Germany) Borussia Dortmund	14	4	0	10	387	449	−62	8	Playoffs	30–43	24–33	24–31	32–36	28–26	—	22–26	30–24
7	(Norway) Storhamar HE	14	3	0	11	371	405	−34	6		25–32	24–27	33–39	32–30	28–30	30–31	—	25–14
8	(Montenegro) OTP Group Budućnost	14	1	1	12	341	443	−102	3		20–36	23–39	34–34	26–29	24–25	22–25	22–26	—

Source: EHF
Rules for classification: Tiebreakers

=== Group B ===
Pos	Team	Pld	W	D	L	GF	GA	GD	Pts	Qualification	BRE	BUC	FER	ODE	IKA	KOP	KRI	SOL
1	(France) Brest Bretagne Handball	14	11	0	3	476	414	+62	22	Quarterfinals	—	34–31	34–31	40–33	35–37	33–25	32–20	36–25
2	(Romania) CSM București	14	10	0	4	452	402	+50	20 (Note: CSM București 4 pts, FTC-Rail Cargo Hungaria 0 pts.)	Quarterfinals	40–34	—	31–28	30–36	33–24	34–24	26–20	34–31
3	(Hungary) FTC-Rail Cargo Hungaria	14	10	0	4	428	399	+29	20	Playoffs	29–28	30–35	—	32–34	27–24	31–23	38–31	26–25
4	(Denmark) Odense Håndbold	14	9	1	4	467	421	+46	19	Playoffs	31–40	24–33	28–30	—	35–28	42–24	30–21	32–27
5	(Denmark) Ikast Håndbold	14	8	0	6	425	416	+9	16	Playoffs	33–36	28–27	27–28	30–33	—	36–30	27–25	32–23
6	(Croatia) HC Podravka Vegeta	14	3	1	10	383	445	−62	7	Playoffs	30–31	28–33	33–37	31–31	29–33	—	24–23	31–26
7	(Slovenia) RK Krim Mercator	14	2	1	11	360	424	−64	5		24–37	31–27	22–33	30–38	33–35	22–27	—	22–22
8	(Norway) Sola HK	14	1	1	12	365	435	−70	3		24–26	30–38	24–28	25–40	22–31	33–24	28–35	—

Source: EHF
Rules for classification: Tiebreakers

== Knockout stage ==
=== Playoffs ===
Team 1	Agg.	Team 2	1st leg	2nd leg
HC Podravka Vegeta (Croatia)	55–68	(Denmark) Team Esbjerg	26–37	29–31
Borussia Dortmund (Germany)	52–58	(Hungary) FTC-Rail Cargo Hungaria	25–31	27–27
Ikast Håndbold (Denmark)	62–72	(Romania) CS Gloria Bistrița	34–35	28–37
DVSC Schaeffler (Hungary)	66–71	(Denmark) Odense Håndbold	32–37	34–34

=== Quarterfinals ===
Team 1	Agg.	Team 2	1st leg	2nd leg
Odense Håndbold (Denmark)	53–76	(Hungary) Győri Audi ETO KC	28–36	25–40
CS Gloria Bistrița (Romania)	65–72	(France) Brest Bretagne Handball	35–36	30–36
FTC-Rail Cargo Hungaria (Hungary)	59–62	(France) Metz Handball	31–31	28–31
Team Esbjerg (Denmark)	53–62	(Romania) CSM București	26–25	27–37

=== Final four ===
The final four was held at the MVM Dome in Budapest, Hungary on 6 and 7 June 2026.

==== Bracket ====
Semi-finals
6 June
(France) Brest Bretagne Handball	30
(Hungary) Győri Audi ETO KC	31
6 June
(France) Metz Handball	32
(Romania) CSM București	27

Final
7 June
(Hungary) Győri Audi ETO KC	29
(France) Metz Handball	31
Third place
7 June
(France) Brest Bretagne Handball	26
(Romania) CSM București	32

==== Final ====
7 June 2026; 18:00	Győri Audi ETO KC (Hungary)	29–31	(France) Metz Handball	MVM Dome, Budapest; Attendance: 22,022; Referees: Antić, Jakovljević (SRB)
7 June 2026; 18:00	De Paula 7	(17–18)	Bouktit 12	MVM Dome, Budapest; Attendance: 22,022; Referees: Antić, Jakovljević (SRB)
7 June 2026; 18:00	4× (suspension) 1× (red card)	Report	3× (suspension)	MVM Dome, Budapest; Attendance: 22,022; Referees: Antić, Jakovljević (SRB)

== Top goalscorers ==
Rank	Player	Club	Goals
1	(Norway) Henny Reistad	(Denmark) Team Esbjerg	131
2	(France) Sarah Bouktit	(France) Metz Handball	125
3	(Spain) Danila So Delgado	(Romania) CS Gloria Bistrița	121
4	(Russia) Anna Vyakhireva	(France) Brest Bretagne Handball	117
5	(Slovenia) Elizabeth Omoregie	(Romania) CSM București	108
6	(Netherlands) Dione Housheer	(Hungary) Győri Audi ETO KC	106
7	(Denmark) Julie Scaglione	(Denmark) Ikast Håndbold	103
8	(Hungary) Petra Simon	(Hungary) FTC-Rail Cargo Hungaria	98
9	(Norway) Stine Skogrand	(Denmark) Ikast Håndbold	91
9	(France) Alicia Toublanc	(Hungary) DVSC Schaeffler	91

== See also ==
- 2025–26 EHF Champions League
- 2025–26 EHF European League
- 2025–26 EHF European Cup
- 2025–26 Women's EHF European League
- 2025–26 Women's EHF European Cup
