= Rune Haugseng =

Norwegian handball player

Personal information
- Nationality: Norwegian
- Born: 16 March 1970 (age 56)

Sport
- Sport: Handball
National team
Years	Team	Apps	(Gls)
1998–1999	Norway	23	(41)

Rune Haugseng (born 16 March 1970) is a Norwegian handball player.

He made his debut on the Norwegian national team in 1998, and played 23 matches for the national team between 1998 and 1999. He competed at the 1999 World Men's Handball Championship.

He is the father of fellow handball players Kaja Haugseng and Andreas Horst Haugseng.
