= Selma Henriksen =

Norwegian handball player (born 2002)

Selma Helén Henriksen
Personal information
- Nationality: Norwegian
- Born: 25 July 2002 (age 24) Fredrikstad, Norway
- Height: 1.80 m (5 ft 11 in)

Sport
- Sport: Handball
- Position: Pivot
- Current club: Sola HK
- Number: 6

Youth career
- Years: Team
- –: Kråkerøy IL

Senior clubs
- Years: Team
- 2018–2025: Fredrikstad BK
- 2025–2027: Sola HK
- 2027–: Ikast Håndbold
National team
Years	Team	Apps	(Gls)
2025–	Norway	22	(41)
Medal record
World Championship
Gold medal – first place	2025 Germany/Netherlands

Selma Helén Henriksen (born 25 July 2002) is a Norwegian handball player for Sola HK and the Norwegian national team.

Henriksen also represented Norway at the 2019 European Women's U-17 Handball Championship, placing 6th.

In September 2025, she was selected to represent Norway in a tournament. On 19 September 2025, Henriksen made her debut on the Norwegian national team against Turkey, scoring five goals.

In November 2025, Henriksen was selected to represent Norway at the 2025 World Women's Handball Championship. Here Norway won gold medals. Henriksen acted mainly as a back-up during the tournament.

== Achievements ==
- World Championship:
  - Winner: 2025
- Norwegian League:
  - Winner: 2025/26

== Individual awards ==
- Public Favorite of REMA 1000-ligaen: 2025/2026
