= Hilde Østbø =

Norwegian handball player (born 1974)

Personal information
- Nationality: Norwegian
- Born: 1 September 1974 (age 52) Stavanger, Norway

Sport
- Sport: Handball

Senior clubs
- Years: Team
- –: Sola HK
National team
- Years: Team
- –: Norway

Hilde Østbø (born 1 September 1974) is a Norwegian handball player who played for the club Sola IL and the Norwegian national team in the 1990s. She was born in Stavanger. She competed at the 1996 Summer Olympics in Atlanta, where the Norwegian team finished fourth.
