= Steffen Stegavik =

Norwegian handball player (born 1983)

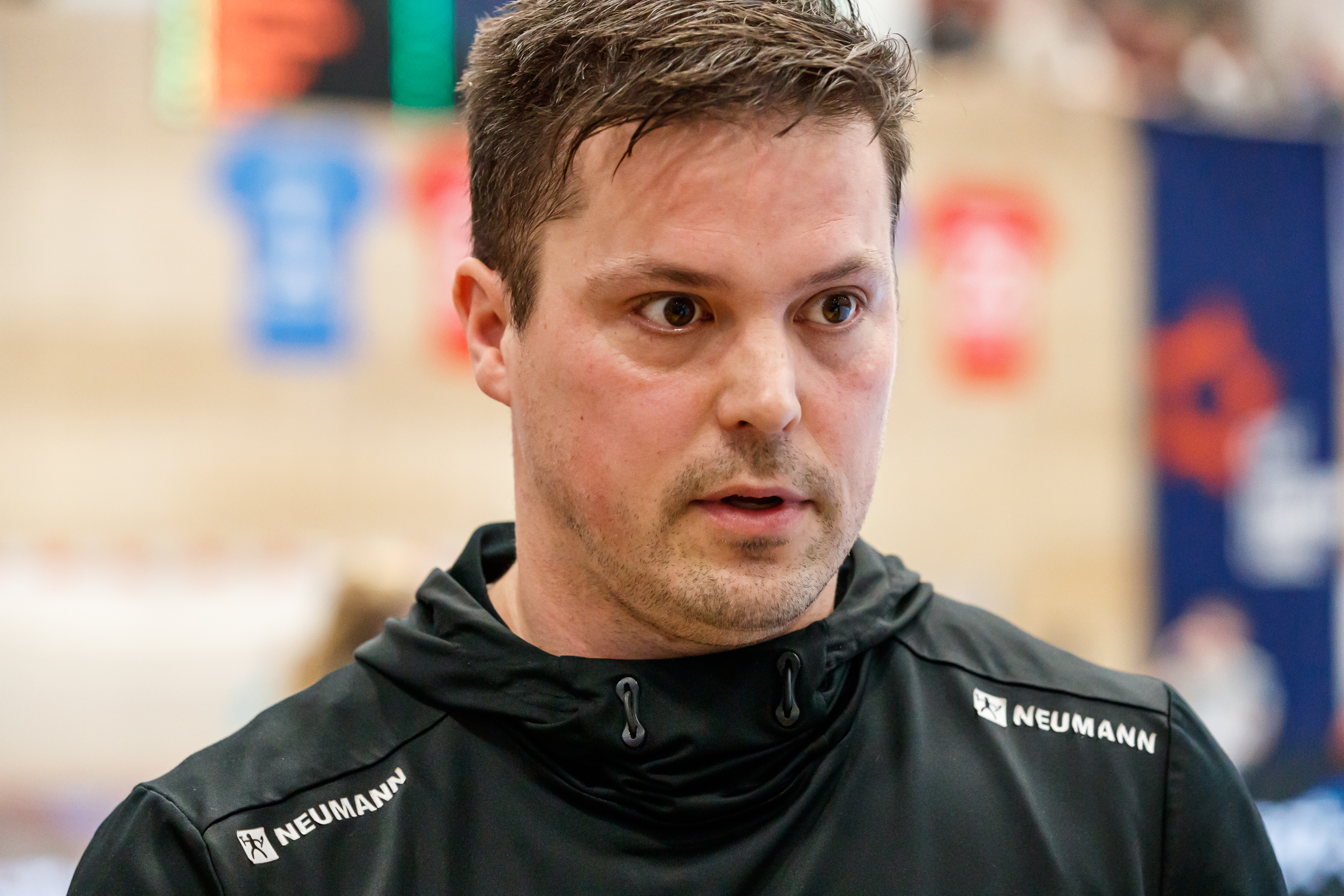

Personal information
- Full name: Steffen Stormo Stegavik
- Nationality: Norwegian
- Born: 30 November 1983 (age 42) Trondheim, Norway
- Height: 1.83 m (6 ft 0 in)

Sport
- Sport: Handball
- Position: Centre back
- Current club: Retired

Senior clubs
- Years: Team
- –: SK Rapp
- –: Vikhammer Håndballklubb
- -2007: Heimdal Håndballklubb
- 2007–2008: Elverum Håndball
- 2008–2009: Drammen HK
- 2009–2013: Elverum Håndball
- 2013–2014: Kolstad Håndball
- 2014–2015: HC Minaur Baia Mare
- 2015–2016: Elverum Håndball
- 2016–2020: Nærbø Idrettslag
National team
Years	Team	Apps	(Gls)
2004–2011	Norway	42	(86)

Teams managed
- 2020–: Sola HK

Steffen Stormo Stegavik (born 30 November 1983) is a Norwegian former handball who played for Nærbø Idrettslag. He is currently coaching Sola HK.

== Achievements ==
- Norwegian League:
  - Winner: 2008, 2012, 2013
- Norwegian Cup :
  - Winner: 2010
- Romanian National League:
  - Winner: 2015
- Romanian Cup:
  - Winner: 2015
- EHF Cup Winners' Cup:
  - Quarterfinalist: 2011

== Individual awards ==
- Norwegian League Top Scorer: 2007, 2008

== Personal life ==
Since July 2013, he is married to Norwegian international handballer, Camilla Herrem.
