= Kaja Haugseng =

Norwegian handball player (born 2001)

Kaja Horst Haugseng
Personal information
- Full name: Kaja Horst Haugseng
- Nationality: Norwegian
- Born: 23 September 2001 (age 25) Stavanger, Norway
- Height: 1.83 m (6 ft 0 in)

Sport
- Sport: Handball
- Position: Pivot
- Current club: Sola HK
- Number: 9

Senior clubs
- Years: Team
- 2018–2019: Sola HK
- 2019–2021: Tertnes HE
- 2021–: Sola HK
National team
Years	Team	Apps	(Gls)
2022–	Norway	6	(5)
Medal record
Junior European Championship
Bronze medal – third place	2019 Hungary

Kaja Horst Haugseng (born 23 September 2001) is a Norwegian handball player who plays for Sola HK in REMA 1000-ligaen and the Norwegian national team.

She made her debut on the Norwegian national team on 21 April 2022, against North Macedonia.

== Personal life ==
Her father Rune Haugseng was also a professional handball player, and so is her brother Andreas Horst Haugseng.

== Achievements ==
- Norwegian League
  - Winner: 2025/26
  - Silver: 2024/2025
  - Bronze: 2021/2022, 2022/2023, 2023/2024
- Norwegian Cup
  - Silver: 2022/2023
