= Sola HK =

Norwegian handball club

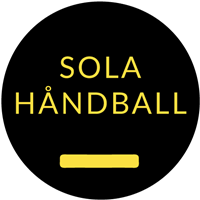
- Full name: Sola Håndballklubb
- Founded: 1934; 92 years ago (as Sola Turn og Idrettslag)
- Arena: Åsenhallen
- Capacity: 1,200
- President: Ivar Gram Klette
- Head coach: Steffen Stegavik
- League: REMA 1000-ligaen
- 2025–26: 1st
Home	Away

Sola HK (short: Sola Håndball) is a handball club from Sola Municipality in Rogaland county, Norway. The women's team currently competes in REMA 1000-ligaen.

== History ==
The club was founded as the handball department of Sola Turn og Idrettslag in 1934. In 1995 the various teams was split up, and Sola Fotball and Sola Handball were created.

In 1994 the team was promoted from the 3rd to the 2nd division, and just the season after it was promoted to the 1st Division, winning 23 of 24 games. In 1995-96 the team won the first division with 21 wins out of 26. However they were relegated just the season after.

In 1997-98 the team was promoted again, after winning all 24 games in the 1st division.

In the 2005-06 season, the team was relegated after finishing 11th. They were then in the second tier until 2009-10, when they finished 2nd behind Flint Tønsberg.

In the 2025-26 season, the team won their first ever Norwegian Championship, after finishing 2nd the season before.

== Results ==
=== Norway ===
- REMA 1000-ligaen
  - Gold: 2025/26
  - Silver: 2024/25
  - Bronze: 2020/21, 2021/22, 2022/23, 2023/24
- Norwegian Cup
  - Finalist: 2020, 2022/23
- 1st division
  - Gold: 1995/96, 1997/98
  - Silver: 2009/10
- 2nd division
  - Winner: 1994/95

== Team ==
=== Current squad ===
Squad for the 2026–27 season

Goalkeeper

- 12 (Norway) Rikke Granlund
- 16 (Norway) Johanna Fossum

Wingers
RW

- 7 (Norway) Synne With
- 22 (Norway) Pia Grønstad

LW

- 29 (Norway) Thea Kristensen
- 77 (Norway) Camilla Herrem (c)

Line players

- 6 (Norway) Selma Henriksen
- 9 (Norway) Kaja Haugseng
- 13 (Norway) Fride Heggdal Stølen
- 27 (Norway) Thea Årsvold

Back players
LB

- 5 (Norway) Malin Holta
- 10 (Norway) Angunn Gudmestad
- 18 (Switzerland) Noelle Isabella Osterwalder
- 20 (Norway) Martine Kårigstad Andersen
- 23 (Norway) Elise Utsola
- 24 (Norway) Martha Barka

CB

- 3 (Norway) Frida Brandbu Andersen
- 8 (Norway) Frøydis Seierstad Eriksen
- 17 (Norway) Kristiane Knutsen (pregnant)
- 31 (Norway) Sara Todireanu Thorsen

RB

- 11 (Norway) Hanna Ræstad
- 15 (Norway) Maria Khan

=== Transfers ===
Transfers for the 2026–27 season

Joining

- (Norway) Mats Jansen (Assistant coach) (from (Norway) Falk Horten)
- (Norway) Johanna Fossum (GK) (from (Germany) Neckarsulmer SU)
- (Norway) Angunn Gudmestad (LB) (from (Germany) Neckarsulmer SU)
- (Switzerland) Noelle Isabella Osterwalder (LB) (from (Switzerland) Yellow Winterthur)
- (Norway) Martine Kårigstad Andersen (LB) (from (Norway) Fana)
- (Norway) Frøydis Seierstad (CB) (from (Norway) Larvik HK)
- (Norway) Elise Utsola (RB) (from own rows)
- (Norway) Thea Årsvold (P) (from own rows)
- (Norway) Fride Heggdal Stølen (P) (from (Norway) Fana) effective immediately

Leaving

- (Norway) Petter Grønstad (Assistant coach) (to (Norway) Larvik HK)
- (Norway) Ine Skartveit Bergsvik (GK) (retires)
- (Norway) Vilde Refsland (LW) (to (Norway) Stavanger IF)
- (Norway) Ine Erlandsen Grimsrud (LB) (to (Sweden) VästeråsIrsta HF)
- (Denmark) Melanie Bak (LB) (to (Denmark) Ikast Håndbold)
- (Kosovo) Merlinda Qorraj (LB) (to (France) Le Havre AC)
- (Norway) Dina Klungtveit Olufsen (CB) (to (Norway) Ålgård IL)
- (Norway) Hege Holgersen Danielsen (P) (retires)
- (Norway) Steffen Stegavik (Head coach) (to (Denmark) Odense Håndbold) Effective 1 January 2027

Transfers for the 2027–28 season

Joining

Leaving

- (Norway) Frida Brandbu Andersen (CB) (to (Denmark) Ikast Håndbold)
- (Norway) Selma Henriksen (P) (to (Denmark) Ikast Håndbold)

=== Technical staff ===
- Head coach: Steffen Stegavik
- Assistant coach: Mats Jansen
- Goalkeeping coach: Ine Skartveit Bergsvik

=== Notable former club and national team players ===
- (Norway) Hilde Østbø
- (Norway) Lene Tønnesen
- (Norway) Mimi Kopperud Slevigen
- (Norway) Tonje Nøstvold
- (Norway) Ida Bjørndalen Karlsson
- (Norway) Ingrid Ødegård
- (Norway) Anja Hammerseng-Edin
- (Norway) Live Rushfeldt Deila
- (Norway) Kristina Novak
- (Brazil) Mayssa Pessoa
- (Slovenia) Maja Breznik
- (Netherlands) Rinka Duijndam

=== Notable former club players ===
- (Norway) Gro Engstrøm
- (Norway) Line Ellertsen
- (Norway) Silje Bolset
- (Norway) Trine Fjelde Olsen
- (Norway) Monica Meland
- (Norway) Marianne Økland
- (Norway) Mette Ommundsen
- (Norway) Marianne Mellemstrand
- (Norway) Lene Andersen Ege
- (Norway) Olaug Iren Lode
- (Denmark) Susan Andersen
- (Norway) Susann Jøraanstad
- (Norway) Monica Nesvik
- (Norway) Linn Merete Rosenlund
- (Norway) Malene Solheim
- (Norway) Katrine Høyland
- (Norway) Heidi Samuelsen
- (Norway) Nina Stokland
- (Norway) Hege Bakken Wahlquist
- (Norway) Tonje Haug Lerstad
- (Norway) Amalie Frøland
- (Norway) Guro Berland Husebø
- (Norway) Lene Kristiansen Tveiten
- (Norway) Maja Magnussen
- (Norway) Mia Kristin Syverud
- (Norway) Ine Marie Terland
- (Norway) Martine Wolff
- (Norway) Ine Erlandsen Grimsrud
- (Norway) Dina Klungtveit Olufsen
- (Norway) Hege Holgersen Danielsen
- (Norway) Ine Skartveit Bergsvik
- (Canada) Kimberley Ewanovich
- (Denmark) Melanie Bak
- (Kosovo) Merlinda Qorraj
- (Poland) Alicja Lucyna Zacharska
- (Sweden) Esmeralda Fetahovic

== Statistics ==
=== Top scorers in the EHF Champions League ===
Last updated on 15 November 2026

Rank	Name	Seasons played	Goals
1	(Norway) Camilla Herrem	2	102
2	(Norway) Frida Brandbu Andersen	2	85
3	(Norway) Pia Grønstad	2	54
4	(Norway) Selma Henriksen	2	51
5	(Norway) Kristiane Knutsen	2	45
6	(Norway) Synne With	2	38
7	(Norway) Malin Holta	2	36
8	(Norway) Dina Klungtveit Olufsen	1	31
9	(Norway) Kaja Haugseng	2	27
10	(Norway) Hanna Ræstad	2	23

=== Top scorers in EHF European League ===
Last updated on 22 February 2025

Rank	Name	Seasons played	Goals
1	(Norway) Camilla Herrem	3	175
2	(Norway) Kristina Novak	3	157
3	(Norway) Maja Magnussen	3	128
4	(Norway) Live Rushfeldt Deila	3	112
5	(Norway) Malin Holta	2	109
6	(Norway) Kristiane Knutsen	4	92
7	(Norway) Lene Kristiansen Tveiten	3	72
8	(Norway) Frøydis Seierstad Eriksen	2	56
8	(Norway) Kaja Haugseng	3	56
10	(Norway) Martine Wolff	3	46

== European record ==
Season	Competition	Round	Club	1st leg	2nd leg	Aggregate
2005-06	EHF Cup Winners' Cup	R1	(Cyprus) SPES Kefalovrysos	53–11	37–15	90–26
2005-06	EHF Cup Winners' Cup	R2	(Russia) Kuban Krasnodar	25–30	24–25	49–55
2021–22	EHF European League	R2	(Russia) HC Kuban Krasnodar	37–33	31–24	68–57
2021–22	EHF European League	R3	(Russia) HC Astrakhanochka	36–25	20–27	56–52
2021–22	EHF European League	Group Matches; Group A	(France) ESBF Besançon	39–32	34–27	1st place
2021–22	EHF European League	Group Matches; Group A	(Hungary) Mosonmagyaróvári KC SE	31–26	27–22	1st place
2021–22	EHF European League	Group Matches; Group A	(Croatia) RK Lokomotiva Zagreb	25–18	40–25	1st place
2021–22	EHF European League	QF	(Romania) CS Minaur Baia Mare	32–40	29–29	61–69
2022–23	EHF European League	R3	(Spain) Rocasa Gran Canaria	32–29	34–28	66–57
2022–23	EHF European League	Group Matches; Group C	(Denmark) Nykøbing Falster Håndbold	28–26	26–28	2nd place
2022–23	EHF European League	Group Matches; Group C	(Hungary) DVSC Schaeffler	30–25	21–25	2nd place
2022–23	EHF European League	Group Matches; Group C	(Croatia) Podravka Koprivnica	35–29	31–23	2nd place
2022–23	EHF European League	QF	(Germany) Thüringer HC	35–35	24–27	59–62
2023–24	EHF European League	R3	(Spain) Super Amara Bera Bera	39–32	28–34	67–66
2023–24	EHF European League	Group Matches; Group D	(Spain) Costa del Sol Malaga	26–22	36–31	1st place
2023–24	EHF European League	Group Matches; Group D	(Hungary) Motherson Mosonmagyaróvár	28–32	34–29	1st place
2023–24	EHF European League	Group Matches; Group D	(Romania) CSM Târgu Jiu	40–29	31–21	1st place
2023–24	EHF European League	QF	(France) Neptunes de Nantes	27–31	30–39	57–70
2024–25	EHF European League	R3	(Switzerland) LC Brühl Handball	33–23	37–32	70–55
2024–25	EHF European League	Group Matches; Group B	(Denmark) Ikast Håndbold	34–35	26–32	4th place
2024–25	EHF European League	Group Matches; Group B	(Germany) Borussia Dortmund	32–30	28–29	4th place
2024–25	EHF European League	Group Matches; Group B	(Romania) SCM Râmnicu Vâlcea	29–32	34–38	4th place
2025–26	EHF Champions League	Group stage Group B	(Romania) CSM București	30–38	31–34	8th place
2025–26	EHF Champions League	Group stage Group B	(Denmark) Odense Håndbold	27–32	25–40	8th place
2025–26	EHF Champions League	Group stage Group B	(France) Brest Bretagne Handball	24–26	25–36	8th place
2025–26	EHF Champions League	Group stage Group B	(Hungary) Ferencvárosi TC	25–26	24–28	8th place
2025–26	EHF Champions League	Group stage Group B	(Slovenia) RK Krim Mercator	28–35	22–22	8th place
2025–26	EHF Champions League	Group stage Group B	(Croatia) RK Podravka Koprivnica	26–31	33–26	8th place
2025–26	EHF Champions League	Group stage Group B	(Denmark) Ikast Håndbold	22–31	23–32	8th place
2026–27	EHF Champions League	Group stage Group A	(France) Brest Bretagne Handball	25–29		
2026–27	EHF Champions League	Group stage Group A	(Denmark) Team Esbjerg	25–28		
2026–27	EHF Champions League	Group stage Group A	(Hungary) FTC-Rail Cargo Hungaria	25–28		
2026–27	EHF Champions League	Group stage Group A	(Germany) Borussia Dortmund	27–32		
2026–27	EHF Champions League	Group stage Group A	(Montenegro) OTP Group Budućnost	22–23		
2026–27	EHF Champions League	Group stage Group A	(Romania) CSM București	30–22		
2026–27	EHF Champions League	Group stage Group A	(Slovenia) RK Krim Mercator	29–22	37–27	
