= TeraPlast Arena =

Indoor arena in Bistrița, Romania

- Interactive map of TeraPlast Arena
- Address: 33 Aerodromului Street
- Location: Bistrița, Romania
- Coordinates: 47.1621°N 24.5587°E
- Owner: Bistrița-Năsăud County Council
- Operator: Gloria Bistrița
- Capacity: 3,007 (handball)
- Type: Arena

Construction
- Groundbreaking: October 18, 2019
- Opened: August 12, 2022
- Cost: €27.3 million
- Architect: Dico și Țigănaș
- General contractor: CNI

Tenant
- Gloria Bistrița (Liga Florilor MOL) (2022–present)

TeraPlast Arena is a multi-purpose arena located in the Wonderland Complex in Unirea neighbourhood of Bistrița, Romania. It is the home of Gloria Bistrița of the Liga Florilor MOL.

Groundbreaking and construction began on 18 October 2019. The arena opened on 12 August 2022.

== See also ==
- List of indoor arenas in Romania
