= Sydbank Arena Odense =

Sports complex in Odense, Denmark

Sydbank Arena
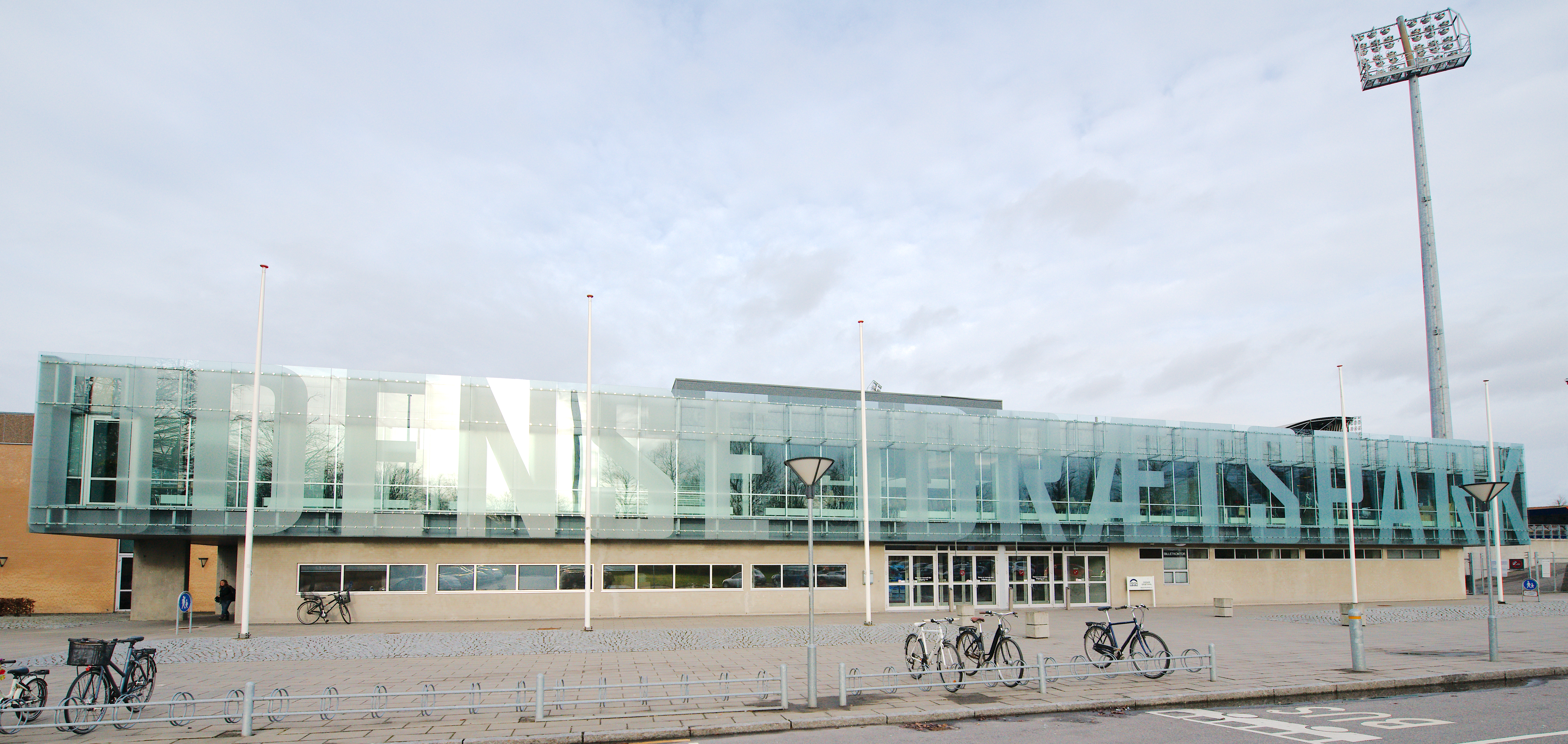
- The arena in February 2015 (still named Odense Idrætshal)
- Interactive map of Sydbank Arena
- Full name: Sydbank Arena
- Former names: Odense Idrætshal
- Location: Israels Plads 3, 5200 Odense V, Denmark
- Coordinates: 55°24′00″N 10°21′00″E
- Operator: Odense Idrætspark
- Capacity: 2,256 (sport); 3,000 (concerts)
- Field size: 46 × 24 m

Construction
- Renovated: 1967

Tenants
- Odense Håndbold (handball); Denmark Open (badminton, since 2009)

Sydbank Arena (formerly Odense Idrætshal) is an indoor sports complex in Odense, Denmark, primarily used for team handball and badminton. It serves as the home venue for the Danish Women's Handball League club Odense Håndbold.

The arena has hosted the Denmark Open badminton tournament annually since 2009.

In August 2020, the venue was renamed Sydbank Arena under a sponsorship agreement with Sydbank.
