= Sara Šenvald =

Croatian handballer (born 1996)

Personal information
- Nationality: Croatian
- Born: 14 March 1996 (age 30) Koprivnica, Croatia
- Height: 1.85 m (6 ft 1 in)

Sport
- Sport: Handball
- Position: Pivot
- Current club: RK Podravka Koprivnica
- Number: 18

Senior clubs
- Years: Team
- –2016: RK Podravka Koprivnica
- 2013–2014: → ŽRK Koka Varaždin (loan)
- 2016–2020: RK Lokomotiva Zagreb
- 2020–2021: Neckarsulmer SU
- 2021–: RK Podravka Koprivnica
National team
Years	Team	Apps	(Gls)
2022–	Croatia	61	(71)
Medal record
Mediterranean Games
Silver medal – second place	2022 Oran	Team
- Updated on 29 October 2026

Sara Šenvald (born 14 March 1996) is a Croatian handballer for RK Podravka Koprivnica and the Croatian national team.

She represented Croatia at the 2022 European Women's Handball Championship and the 2024 European Women's Handball Championship. She also represented them at the 2025 World Women's Handball Championship.
