= Elizabeth Omoregie =

Bulgarian-Slovenian handball player (born 1996)

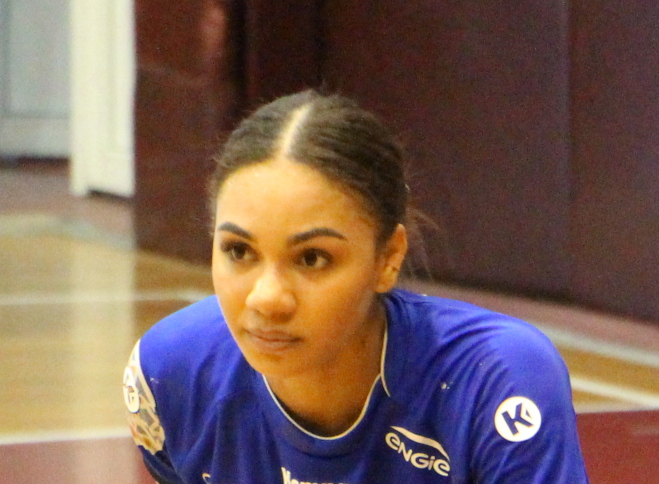

Personal information
- Born: 29 December 1996 (age 29) Athens, Greece
- Height: 1.78 m (5 ft 10 in)

Sport
- Sport: Handball
- Position: Centre back
- Current club: Ferencvárosi TC
- Number: 17

Senior clubs
- Years: Team
- 2014–2018: RK Krim
- 2018–2026: CSM București
- 2026–: Ferencvárosi TC
National team
Years	Team		
2015–2017	Bulgaria		
2019–2024	Slovenia	41	(80)

Elizabeth Omoregie (born 29 December 1996) is a female handball player for Ferencvárosi TC and the Slovenian national team.

Omoregie was born and raised in Athens, Greece to a Nigerian father and Bulgarian mother. She was one of four children in the family, which moved to Pleven in Bulgaria, where she went to school.

In October 2017, it was announced that Omoregie obtained Slovenian citizenship and that she will play for the Slovenian national team.

On 27 April 2018, it was announced that she had signed with the Romanian team CSM București from the summer of the same year.

She represented Slovenia at the 2020 and the 2022 European Women's Handball Championship.

Elizabeth presented her national team Slovenia at the Paris Olympics 2024.

== Awards and honors ==
National

- Romanian Cup:
  - Winner: 2019, 2022
- Romanian League:
  - Runner-up: 2019
- Romanian Supercup:
  - Runner-up: 2018, 2021
- Slovenian League:
  - Winner: 2015, 2017, 2018
- Slovenian Cup:
  - Winner: 2015, 2016, 2017, 2018
- Slovenian Supercup:
  - Winner: 2015, 2016, 2017

Continental

- EHF Cup Winners' Cup:
  - Semifinalist: 2016

Other

- Handball-Planet.com Young World Playmaker of the Season: 2017, 2018
