= Danila So Delgado =

Spanish handball player (born 2001)

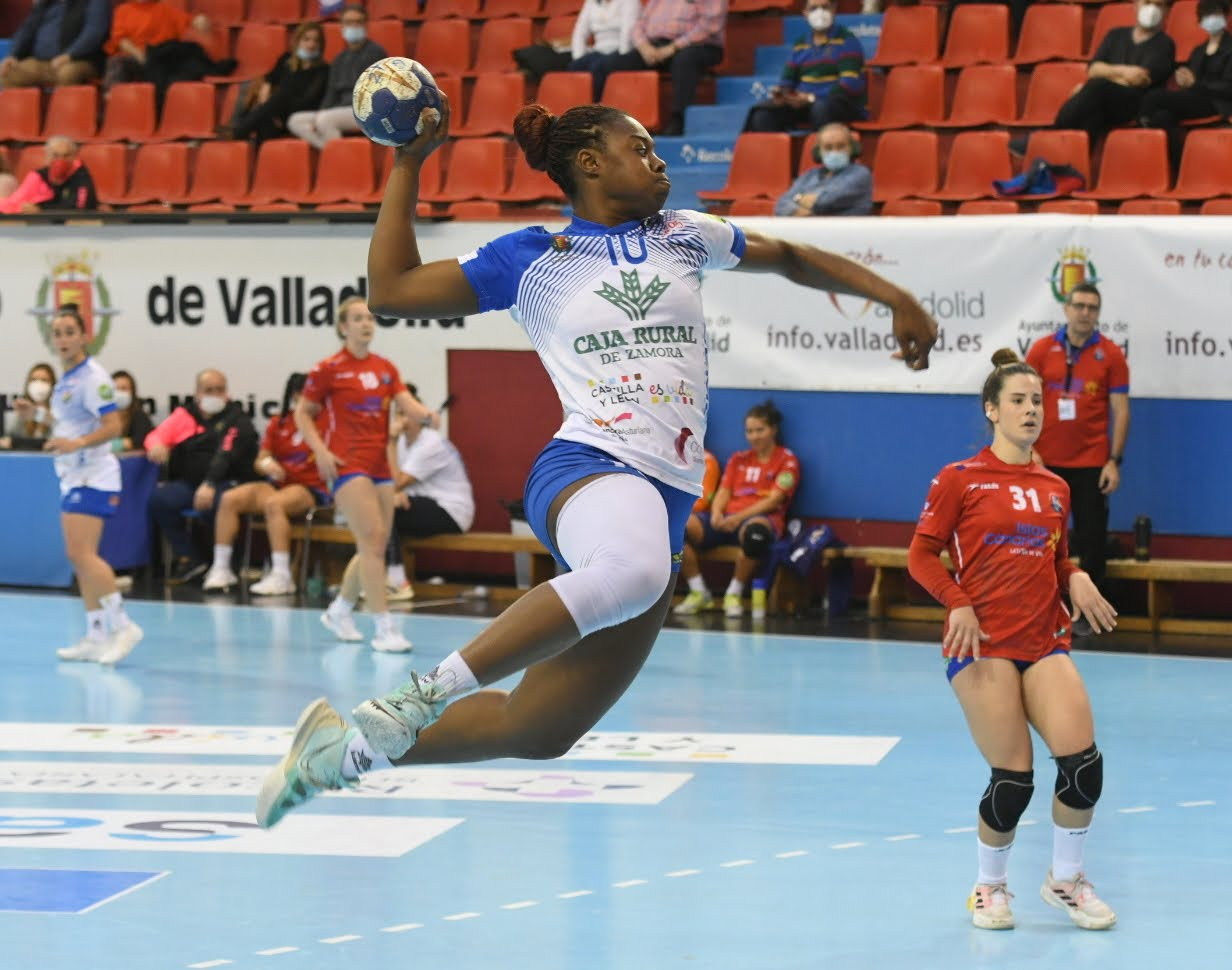

Personal information
- Full name: Danila Patricia So Delgado Pinto
- Born: 19 September 2001 (age 25) Lisbon, Portugal
- Height: 1.75 m (5 ft 9 in)

Sport
- Sport: Handball
- Position: Left back
- Current club: Gloria Bistrița
- Number: 10

Youth career
- Years: Team
- –2018: CB Colores
- 2019–2020: CB Sant Quirze

Senior clubs
- Years: Team
- 2020–2022: BM Aula Valladolid
- 2022–2024: CB Elche
- 2024–: Gloria Bistrița
National team
Years	Team	Apps	(Gls)
2023–	Spain	27	(68)
- Updated on 5 December 2024

Danila Patricia So Delgado Pinto (born 19 September 2001) is a Portuguese-born Spanish professional handballer who plays as a left back for Gloria Bistrița and the Spain national team.

== International honours ==
- EHF European Cup:
  - Winner: 2023–24

== Individual awards ==
- EHF European Cup Top Scorer: 2023–24
- Spanish League MVP: 2023–24
- All-Star Left Back of the Spanish League: 2022–23, 2023–24

== Personal life ==
Her parents were international footballers appearing in Guinea-Bissau. Her two younger brothers are also football players.

So Delgado has a degree in criminology studies.
