= Stine Skogrand =

Norwegian handball player (born 1993)

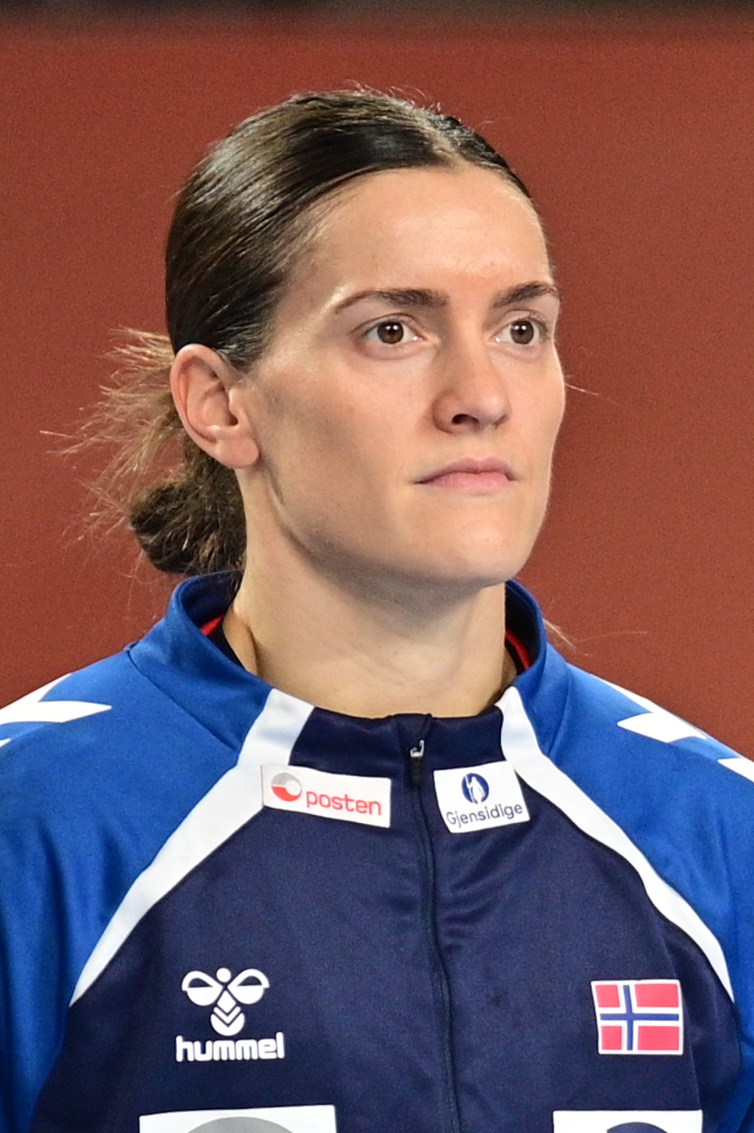
- Skogrand in 2024

Personal information
- Full name: Stine Ruscetta Skogrand
- Nationality: Norwegian
- Born: 3 March 1993 (age 33) Bergen, Norway
- Height: 1.73 m (5 ft 8 in)

Sport
- Sport: Handball
- Position: Right back
- Current club: Ikast Håndbold
- Number: 7

Youth career
- Years: Team
- –: Fyllingen IL
- –: TIF Viking

Senior clubs
- Years: Team
- 2009–2016: Tertnes HE
- 2016–2018: Silkeborg/Voel KFUM
- 2018–2027: Ikast Håndbold
National team
| Years | Team | Apps | (Gls) |
| 2013– | Norway | 190 | (386) |
Medal record
Olympic Games
| Gold medal – first place | 2024 Paris | Team |
| Bronze medal – third place | 2020 Tokyo | Team |
World Championship
| Gold medal – first place | 2015 Denmark |
| Gold medal – first place | 2025 Germany/Netherlands |
| Silver medal – second place | 2017 Germany |
| Silver medal – second place | 2023 Denmark/Norway/Sweden |
European Championship
| Gold medal – first place | 2016 Sweden |
| Gold medal – first place | 2020 Denmark |
| Gold medal – first place | 2022 Slovenia/North Macedonia/Montenegro |
| Gold medal – first place | 2024 Austria/Hungary/Switzerland |
Youth World Championship
| Silver medal – second place | 2010 Dominican Republic |

Stine Ruscetta Skogrand (born 3 March 1993) is a Norwegian handball player for Ikast Håndbold, where she is the club captain. and the Norwegian national team.

Her position is mainly right back, although in the national team she played right wing in many tournaments.

== Career ==
Skogrand played her youth handball at Fyllingen and TIF Viking.

Her first professional club was Tertnes IL, where she played in the highest Norwegian league. In 2016, she joined Danish side Silkeborg-Voel KFUM, where she played for two years before joining league rivals Herning-Ikast Håndbold.

In October 2018, she took a break from handball due to maternity leave. In 2019, she won the Danish Cup with Herning-Ikast. The same year she extended her contract until 2023. In November 2021, she took a second maternity leave. In the summer of 2022, she returned to Ikast Håndbold, where she won the EHF European League the following season.

== National team ==
At the 2010 Women's Youth World Handball Championship she won silver medals.

She made her debut on the Norwegian national team on 20 April 2013 against South Korea.

At the 2015 World Championship, she won gold medals. A year later she won gold again at the 2016 European Championship.

At the 2017 World Championship she won silver medals, losing to France in the final.

She won her second European gold at the 2020 European Championship. She scored 19 goals during the tournament.

Later the same year, she won bronze medals at the 2020 Olympics. Skogrand scored 20 goals during the tournament.

At the 2022 European Championship she won her third European gold meal. The year after she won silver medals at the 2023 World Championship, once again losing to France in the final. Skogrand scored 27 goals.

At the 2024 Olympics she completed the set of major international tournament trophies, when Norway won gold medals.

Later the same year she another gold medal at the 2024 European Championship, beating Denmark in the final.

At the 2025 World Championship she won her second World Championship gold medal.

== Achievements ==
- Olympic Games:
  - Winner: 2024
  - Bronze: 2020
- World Championship:
  - Winner: 2015, 2025
  - Silver Medalist: 2017, 2023
- European Championship
  - Winner: 2016, 2020, 2022, 2024
- World Youth Championship:
  - Silver Medalist: 2010
- EHF European League:
  - Winner: 2023
  - Silver Medalist: 2025
- Norwegian Cup:
  - Finalist: 2013
- Danish Cup:
  - Winner: 2019

== Individual awards ==
- All-Star Right Back of Damehåndboldligaen: 2017/2018, 2020/2021
- Ikast Håndbold player of the year: 2025

== Personal life ==
Is in a relationship with fellow handballer, Eivind Tangen. In October 2018, she announced her first pregnancy and in November 2021, she announced her second pregnancy.
