= Petra Simon =

Hungarian handball player (born 2004)

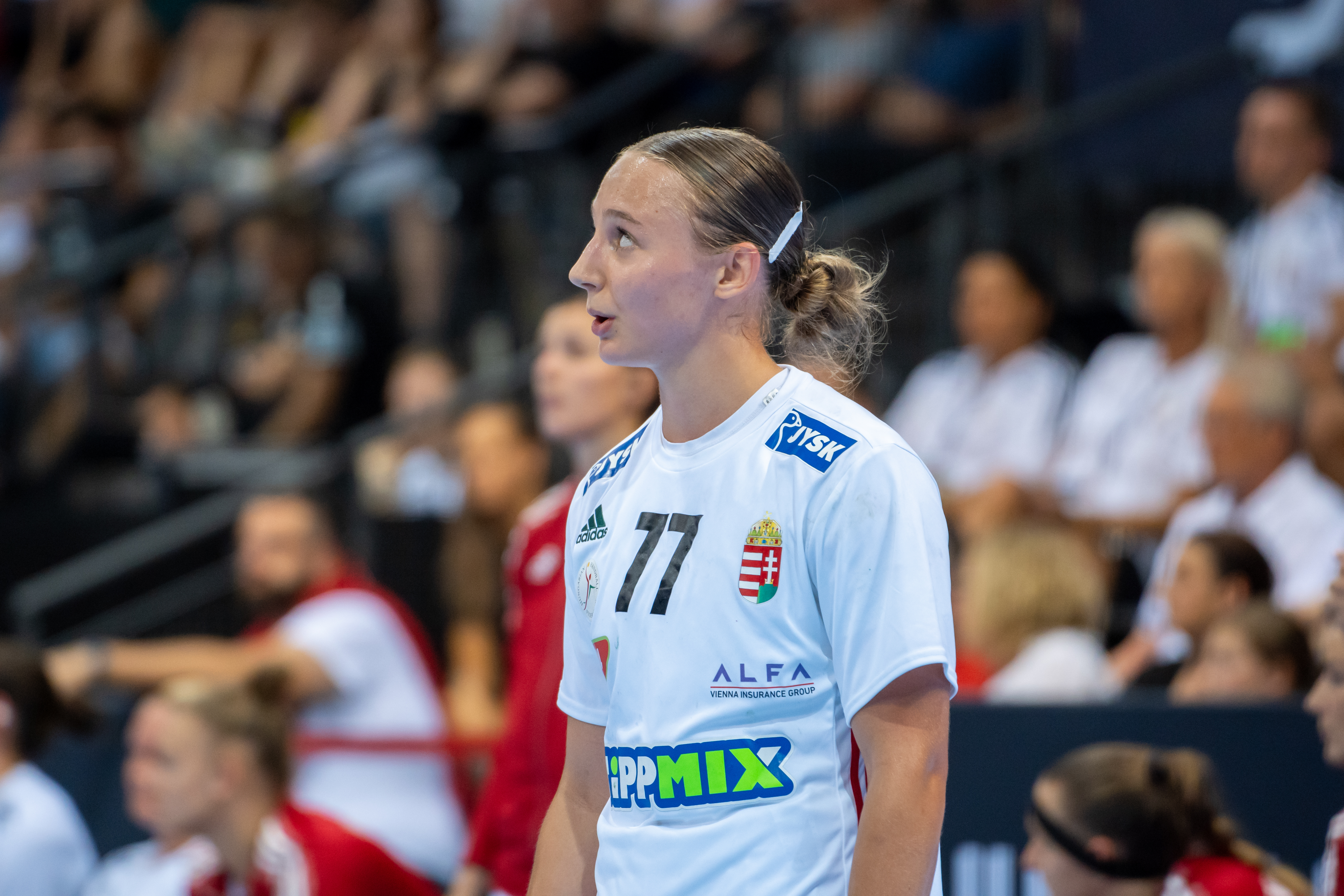
- Simon in 2024

Personal information
- Full name: Petra Anna Simon
- Nationality: Hungarian
- Born: 12 November 2004 (age 21) Budapest, Hungary
- Height: 1.68 m (5 ft 6 in)

Sport
- Sport: Handball
- Position: Centre back
- Current club: Ferencvárosi TC
- Number: 38

Youth career
- Years: Team
- 2014–2018: XVI. kerületi KMSE
- 2018–2019: Ferencvárosi TC

Senior clubs
- Years: Team
- 2019–: Ferencvárosi TC
- 2022–2023: → MTK Budapest (loan)
National team
| Years | Team | Apps | (Gls) |
| 2023– | Hungary | 53 | (164) |
Medal record
European Championship
| Bronze medal – third place | 2024 Austria/Hungary/Switzerland |
Junior European Championship
| Gold medal – first place | 2023 Romania |
Youth European Championship
| Gold medal – first place | 2021 Montenegro |
Youth World Championships
| Bronze medal – third place | 2022 North Macedonia |
- Updated on 10 December 2025

Petra Simon (born 12 November 2004) is a Hungarian handballer for Ferencvárosi TC and the Hungarian national team.

== Career ==
=== Club ===
Simon started her career at XVI. kerületi KMSE. From 2018, she played in the youth teams of Ferencvárosi TC. In the 2019–2020 season, at the age of 15, she already played several times in the Ferencvárosi TC U19 team playing in the adult Nemzeti Bajnokság I/B. In the 2021–2022 season, she scored 185 goals in 26 matches in the adult Nemzeti Bajnokság I/B as her team's most successful player. She made her debut in the Nemzeti Bajnokság I adult women's team in the spring of 2022, scoring 17 goals in 4 matches. The winner against Győri Audi ETO KC broke into the senior team in the Hungarian Cup final: she scored three goals out of three shots in the match won 26–22. She spent the following year on loan with the MTK Budapest team, so she had the opportunity to play in the top flight on a regular basis. She scored 80 goals in 19 matches as his team's second top scorer. She returned to Ferencvárosi TC in 2023 and made her debut in the EHF Champions League, where she scored 39 goals. At the end of the season, she became champion and cup winner with the team.

In 2025 she was named the best young player in the world by IHF.

=== National team ===
In August 2021, Simon scored four goals in the 25–19 final win over Germany at the Youth European Championship. In August 2022, she won a bronze medal at the Youth World Championships and was selected for the All-Star team. In July 2023, she was the most successful player of the Hungarian national team at the Junior European Championship held in Romania, scoring 8 goals in the final against the Danish national team, helping the national team to its third consecutive Junior European Championship title. She was also included in the All-Star team of the tournament, and was also chosen as the most valuable player. In October 2023, the number one manager of the senior national team, Petra Vámos, fell ill, and the national team captain Vladimir Golovin invited Simon to take his place in the European Cup match against the Austria. The Hungary women's national handball team won the away match 34–32, Simon scored 7 goals. She also participated in the 2023 World Women's Handball Championship as a member of the Hungary women's national handball team. (10th place, 6 matches / 9 goals). She also participated in the 2024 Paris Olympics, where the Hungarian team finished 6th (6 matches / 16 goals). At the 2024 European Championship she was part of the Hungarian team that won bronze medals, losing to Norway in semifinal and beating France in the third place play-off. This was the first Hungarian medals since 2012.

== Honours ==
=== National team ===
- European Women's Handball Championship:
  - Bronze: 2024
- Junior European Championship:
  - Gold: 2023
- Youth European Championship:
  - Gold: 2021
- Youth World Championships:
  - Bronze: 2022

=== Club ===
Ferencvárosi TC

- Nemzeti Bajnokság I:
  - Gold: 2024
  - Silver: 2022,
- Magyar Kupa
  - Gold: 2022, 2024, 2025

=== Individual ===
- Best Young Player of the European Championship: 2024
- All-Star Centre Back of the Youth World Championships: 2022
- All-Star Centre Back of the Junior European Championship: 2023
- Most Valuable Player (MVP) in the Junior European Championship: 2023
- Hungarian Youth Handball Player of the Year: 2023, 2024
- European Youth Handball Player of the Year (EHF): 2024
- IHF World Best Young Player of the Year: 2025

== Personal life ==
She is a law student at Eötvös Loránd University.
