= 2021–22 REMA 1000-ligaen (women's handball) =

REMA 1000-ligaen
- Season: 2021–22
- Champions: Vipers Kristiansand
- Relegated: Oppsal; Flint Tønsberg; Follo HK Damer
- EHF Champions League: Vipers Kristiansand; Storhamar HE
- EHF European League: Molde Elite; Sola HK; Storhamar HE; Fana
- Top goalscorer: Christine Karlsen Alver (206 goals)
- Biggest home win: 24 goals: VIP 43–19 FHK
- Biggest away win: 18 goals: FHK 21–39 SOL
- Highest scoring: 84 goals: FHK 36–48 FAN
- All statistics correct as of 19 May 2022.

The 2021–22 REMA 1000-ligaen is the 55th season of REMA 1000-ligaen, Norway's premier handball league.

== Team information ==
A total of 14 teams will be participating in the 2021/22 edition of REMA 1000-ligaen. 13 teams were qualified directly from the 2020/21 season, as no team was relegated last season due to the COVID-19 pandemic. Only Follo HK Damer from 1. divisjon, was promoted to REMA 1000-ligaen. (Note: Usually the league consists of twelve teams, but due to the COVID-19 pandemic the current 2021/2022-season consists of fourteen team since last years season wasn't fully played.)

Team.	Town	Arena	Capacity	Clubs locations in Norway
Aker Topphåndball	Oslo	Ullern Flerbrukshall	250	Clubs locations in Norway
Byåsen Håndball Elite	Trondheim	Trondheim Spektrum	8900	Clubs locations in Norway
Fana	Bergen	Fana Arena	1206	Clubs locations in Norway
Flint Tønsberg	Tønsberg	REMA 1000 Arena	1000	Clubs locations in Norway
Follo HK Damer	Follo	Stil Arena	2500	Clubs locations in Norway
Fredrikstad BK	Fredrikstad	Kongstenhallen	1500	Clubs locations in Norway
Larvik HK	Larvik	Jotron Arena Larvik	4000	Clubs locations in Norway
Molde Elite	Molde	Molde Arena	2000	Clubs locations in Norway
Oppsal	Oslo	Oppsal Arena	5000	Clubs locations in Norway
Romerike Ravens	Rælingen	Marikollhallen	175	Clubs locations in Norway
Sola HK	Sola	Åsenhallen	1200	Clubs locations in Norway
Storhamar Håndball Elite	Hamar	Boligpartner Arena	1650	Clubs locations in Norway
Tertnes Elite	Bergen	Haukelandshallen	5000	Clubs locations in Norway
Vipers Kristiansand	Kristiansand	Aquarama	2200	Clubs locations in Norway

== Regular season ==
This season, the three teams placing 12th, 13th and 14th will be relegated to the 1. divisjon, and the teams placing 9th, 10th and 11th will have to play a relegation playoff tournament.

=== Standings ===
Pos	Team	Pld	W	D	L	GF	GA	GD	Pts	Qualification or relegation
1	Vipers Kristiansand	26	25	1	0	884	604	+280	51	Championship play-offs
2	Storhamar HE	26	21	0	5	796	670	+126	42	Championship play-offs
3	Sola HK	26	18	2	6	771	644	+127	38	Championship play-offs
4	Molde Elite	26	18	1	7	784	720	+64	37	Championship play-offs
5	Fana	26	13	4	9	764	728	+36	30	Championship play-offs
6	Romerike Ravens	26	12	2	12	687	706	−19	26	Championship play-offs
7	Fredrikstad BK	26	12	1	13	677	684	−7	25	Championship play-offs
8	Byåsen HE	26	11	2	13	624	649	−25	24	Championship play-offs
9	Larvik HK	26	9	5	12	662	704	−42	23	Play-off tournament
10	Aker Topphåndball	26	11	0	15	707	732	−25	22	Play-off tournament
11	Tertnes HE	26	9	1	16	694	710	−16	19	Play-off tournament
12	Oppsal	26	4	3	19	608	766	−158	11	Relegated to First Division
13	Flint Tønsberg	26	4	1	21	592	759	−167	9	Relegated to First Division
14	Follo HK Damer	26	2	3	21	650	824	−174	7	Relegated to First Division

Updated to match(es) played on 10 April 2022. Source:
Rules for classification: 1.) Points in head-to-head matches amongst tied teams; 2.) Goal difference in head-to-head matches amongst tied teams; 3.) Goals scored in head-to-head matches among tied teams; 4.) Points in all matches; 5.) Goal difference in all matches.

=== Results ===
In the table below the home teams are listed on the left and the away teams along the top.

Home \ Away	AKT	BYÅ	FAN	FLT	FHK	FBK	LHK	MOL	OPP	RHK	SOL	STO	TER	VIP
Aker Topphåndball		36–30	31–27	28–24	34–22	24–20	24–27	21–30	27–19	25–31	27–30	25–30	35–23	27–39
Byåsen Elite	21–17		35–21	21–24	30–27	30–20	25–25	22–24	26–20	18–15	23–20	19–25	19–28	23–29
Fana	33–26	26–21		35–20	27–20	29–29	29–30	25–28	31–22	28–25	32–30	26–33	28–23	33–33
Flint Tønsberg	24–28	25–24	28–30		22–25	17–26	22–26	24–34	26–18	25–27	25–43	23–30	22–30	23–33
Follo HK Damer	28–36	21–28	36–48	27–24		20–26	27–27	29–32	28–28	28–33	21–39	25–35	22–28	21–32
Fredrikstad BK	34–32	39–25	25–27	25–26	26–22		19–22	26–22	24–21	25–27	22–37	22–27	34–28	23–33
Larvik HK	23–31	21–21	32–32	28–22	29–24	25–21		30–32	33–19	24–24	20–23	26–30	30–27	20–32
Molde Elite	32–19	31–23	36–30	37–24	29–25	23–32	31–22		30–20	38–26	27–31	32–29	32–30	24–40
Oppsal	24–30	25–28	24–32	26–26	27–27	23–29	27–20	30–36		32–26	29–34	23–26	34–32	23–38
Romerike Ravens	26–24	23–26	26–26	29–16	32–26	23–26	29–26	29–34	29–19		22–29	26–38	32–23	25–35
Sola HK	33–28	24–20	28–25	38–20	42–32	35–26	28–19	25–25	28–13	24–28		27–30	20–20	23–24
Storhamar Håndball Elite	36–31	31–24	28–24	30–19	33–21	30–26	34–28	40–34	36–20	23–27	27–30		33–25	26–28
Tertnes Håndball Elite	32–16	17–24	27–32	31–20	34–27	22–27	35–29	30–24	27–28	29–24	25–26	26–29		18–33
Vipers Kristiansand	34–25	35–18	32–28	30–21	43–19	34–25	36–20	38–27	37–14	39–23	34–24	33–27	30–24	

Updated to match(es) played on 10 April 2022. Source: NHF
Legend: Blue = home team win; Yellow = draw; Red = away team win.

== Championship play-offs ==
Best of three format is applied in all play-off stages, with the higher seeded team playing the second and third game (if necessary) at home. If a game ended with a draw after the regular time, it will proceed to two 5-minutes periods of extra time. If there is still a draw, another 2 × 5-minutes extra time will be played. If the scores are still level after two extra times, the winners are decided by a 7-meter shootout.

Top ranked teams from the regular season choose their opponents in the quarterfinal and semifinal stages. The remaining two highest ranked teams after the quarterfinal stage can not meet in the semifinals.

=== Bracket ===
Quarterfinals
1	Vipers Kristiansand	34	40
7	Fredrikstad BK	23	29
4	Molde Elite	36	29	25
8	Byåsen Elite	38	24	21
2	Storhamar Håndball Elite	28	37
6	Romerike Ravens	23	24
3	Sola HK	30	30	33
5	Fana	26	35	32

Semifinals
1	Vipers Kristiansand	36	35
4	Molde Elite	28	22
2	Storhamar Håndball Elite	37	35
3	Sola HK	27	30

Finals
1	Vipers Kristiansand	29	24
2	Storhamar Håndball Elite	23	17

=== Quarterfinals ===
27 April; 18:30	Vipers Kristiansand	34–23	Fredrikstad BK	Aquarama, Kristiansand; Attendance: 803; Referees: Abrahamsen, Myhrstad
27 April; 18:30	Jeřábková 6	(21–14)	Sand 7	Aquarama, Kristiansand; Attendance: 803; Referees: Abrahamsen, Myhrstad
27 April; 18:30	2× (yellow card) 2× (suspension)	Report	2× (yellow card) 1× (suspension)	Aquarama, Kristiansand; Attendance: 803; Referees: Abrahamsen, Myhrstad

3 May; 18:30	Fredrikstad BK	29–40	Vipers Kristiansand	Kongstenhallen, Fredrikstad; Attendance: 800; Referees: Kvakic, Eriksen
3 May; 18:30	Sand 8	(16–19)	Mørk 11	Kongstenhallen, Fredrikstad; Attendance: 800; Referees: Kvakic, Eriksen
3 May; 18:30	2× (yellow card) 2× (suspension)	Report	2× (yellow card) 1× (suspension)	Kongstenhallen, Fredrikstad; Attendance: 800; Referees: Kvakic, Eriksen

Vipers Kristiansand won series, 2–0.

29 April; 19:00	Molde Elite	36–38	Byåsen Elite	Molde Arena, Molde; Attendance: 307; Referees: Martinsen, Hansen
29 April; 19:00	M. Obaidli 13	(16–12)	Jacobsen, Jakobsen 10	Molde Arena, Molde; Attendance: 307; Referees: Martinsen, Hansen
29 April; 19:00	2× (yellow card) 5× (suspension)	Report	1× (yellow card) 3× (suspension)	Molde Arena, Molde; Attendance: 307; Referees: Martinsen, Hansen

3 May; 19:00	Byåsen Elite	24–29	Molde Elite	Kolstad Arena, Trondheim; Attendance: 1,250; Referees: Kalløkkebakken, Valbjør
3 May; 19:00	Jacobsen 9	(10–17)	Deila 11	Kolstad Arena, Trondheim; Attendance: 1,250; Referees: Kalløkkebakken, Valbjør
3 May; 19:00	1× (yellow card) 4× (suspension)	Report	1× (yellow card) 4× (suspension)	Kolstad Arena, Trondheim; Attendance: 1,250; Referees: Kalløkkebakken, Valbjør

8 May; 17:00	Molde Elite	25–21	Byåsen Elite	Molde Arena, Molde; Attendance: 625; Referees: Kalløkkebakken, Valbjør
8 May; 17:00	Karsten 8	(14–14)	Solås 8	Molde Arena, Molde; Attendance: 625; Referees: Kalløkkebakken, Valbjør
8 May; 17:00	2× (suspension)	Report	1× (yellow card) 1× (suspension)	Molde Arena, Molde; Attendance: 625; Referees: Kalløkkebakken, Valbjør

Molde Elite won series, 2–1.

1 May; 17:00	Storhamar Håndball Elite	28–23	Romerike Ravens	Boligpartner Arena, Hamar; Attendance: 679; Referees: Hell, Isachsen
1 May; 17:00	Hovden 7	(16–10)	Muri 6	Boligpartner Arena, Hamar; Attendance: 679; Referees: Hell, Isachsen
1 May; 17:00	2× (yellow card) 3× (suspension)	Report	2× (suspension)	Boligpartner Arena, Hamar; Attendance: 679; Referees: Hell, Isachsen

4 May; 18:30	Romerike Ravens	24–37	Storhamar Elite	Skedsmohallen, Skedsmo; Attendance: 432; Referees: Liltved, Lien
4 May; 18:30	Muri 8	(16–16)	Hovden 10	Skedsmohallen, Skedsmo; Attendance: 432; Referees: Liltved, Lien
4 May; 18:30	3× (suspension)	Report	1× (yellow card) 1× (suspension)	Skedsmohallen, Skedsmo; Attendance: 432; Referees: Liltved, Lien

Storhamar Elite won series, 2–0.

1 May; 18:00	Sola HK	30–26	Fana	Åsenhallen, Sola; Attendance: 452; Referees: Holager, Aksdal
1 May; 18:00	Herrem 7	(18–12)	Alver, Solstad 7	Åsenhallen, Sola; Attendance: 452; Referees: Holager, Aksdal
1 May; 18:00	1× (yellow card) 1× (suspension)	Report	2× (suspension)	Åsenhallen, Sola; Attendance: 452; Referees: Holager, Aksdal

4 May; 18:30	Fana	35–30	Sola HK	Fana Arena, Fana; Attendance: 628; Referees: Nygren, Borge
4 May; 18:30	Mastad 9	(18–12)	Deila 7	Fana Arena, Fana; Attendance: 628; Referees: Nygren, Borge
4 May; 18:30	2× (suspension)	Report	1× (suspension)	Fana Arena, Fana; Attendance: 628; Referees: Nygren, Borge

8 May; 18:00	Sola HK	33–32	Fana	Åsenhallen, Sola; Attendance: 678; Referees: Kvakic, Eriksen
8 May; 18:00	Herrem, Novak 9	(16–17)	Alver 7	Åsenhallen, Sola; Attendance: 678; Referees: Kvakic, Eriksen
8 May; 18:00	2× (yellow card) 2× (suspension)	Report	2× (yellow card) 2× (suspension)	Åsenhallen, Sola; Attendance: 678; Referees: Kvakic, Eriksen

Sola Håndballklubb won series, 2–1.

=== Semifinals ===
11 May; 18:30	Vipers Kristiansand	36–28	Molde Elite	Aquarama, Kristiansand; Attendance: 580; Referees: Kvakic, Eriksen
11 May; 18:30	Mørk, Jeřábková, Andersen 6	(19–12)	M. Obaidli 10	Aquarama, Kristiansand; Attendance: 580; Referees: Kvakic, Eriksen
11 May; 18:30	1× (yellow card) 4× (suspension)	Report	1× (yellow card) 4× (suspension)	Aquarama, Kristiansand; Attendance: 580; Referees: Kvakic, Eriksen

19 May; 18:45	Molde Elite	22–35	Vipers Kristiansand	Molde Arena, Molde; Attendance: 581; Referees: Holager, Aksdal
19 May; 18:45	Skinnehaugen 9	(10–21)	Debelić 7	Molde Arena, Molde; Attendance: 581; Referees: Holager, Aksdal
19 May; 18:45	1× (suspension)	Report	1× (yellow card) 5× (suspension)	Molde Arena, Molde; Attendance: 581; Referees: Holager, Aksdal

Vipers Kristiansand won series, 2–0.

11 May; 18:00	Storhamar Håndball Elite	37–27	Sola HK	Boligpartner Arena, Hamar; Attendance: 907; Referees: Nygren, Borge
11 May; 18:00	Hovden 10	(18–11)	Novak 6	Boligpartner Arena, Hamar; Attendance: 907; Referees: Nygren, Borge
11 May; 18:00		Report	1× (yellow card) 1× (suspension)	Boligpartner Arena, Hamar; Attendance: 907; Referees: Nygren, Borge

18 May
20:15
Sola HK
30–35 (ET)
Storhamar Håndball Elite
Åsenhallen, Sola
Attendance: 563
Referees: Fjeldskår, Fjellvang
Haugseng, Deila, Novak, Herrem 6
(14–13)
Venn, Obaidli 7
1× (yellow card) 1× (suspension)
Report
1× (yellow card) 4× (suspension)

FT: 29–29 ET: 1–6

Storhamar Elite won series, 2–0.

=== Finals ===
24 May; 19:15	Vipers Kristiansand	29–23	Storhamar Håndball Elite	Aquarama, Kristiansand; Attendance: 1,539; Referees: Fjeldskår, Fjellvang
24 May; 19:15	Mørk 7	(16–7)	Hovden 6	Aquarama, Kristiansand; Attendance: 1,539; Referees: Fjeldskår, Fjellvang
24 May; 19:15	1× (yellow card) 4× (suspension)	Report	1× (yellow card) 2× (suspension) 1× (red card)	Aquarama, Kristiansand; Attendance: 1,539; Referees: Fjeldskår, Fjellvang

28 May; 19:15	Storhamar Håndball Elite	17–24	Vipers Kristiansand	CC Amfi, Hamar; Attendance: 6,478; Referees: Nygren, Borge
28 May; 19:15	Venn 6	(11–14)	Knedlíková 5	CC Amfi, Hamar; Attendance: 6,478; Referees: Nygren, Borge
28 May; 19:15	4× (suspension)	Report	4× (suspension)	CC Amfi, Hamar; Attendance: 6,478; Referees: Nygren, Borge

Vipers Kristiansand won series, 2–0.

== Awards ==
=== All Star Team and other awards ===
The All Star Team and other awards were announced on 8 June 2022.

Position	Player
Goalkeeper	(Norway) Katrine Lunde (Vipers Kristiansand)
Left wing	(Norway) Camilla Herrem (Sola HK)
Left back	(Norway) Thale Rushfeldt Deila (Molde Elite)
Centre back	(Norway) Christine Karlsen Alver (Fana)
Right back	(Norway) Kristina Novak (Sola HK)
Right wing	(Norway) Emilie Hovden (Storhamar HE)
Pivot	(Norway) Maja Muri (Romerike Ravens)
Rookie	(Norway) Mina Hesselberg (Follo HK Damer) / (Vipers Kristiansand)
Defense player	(Norway) Martha Barka (Sola HK)
MVP	(Norway) Camilla Herrem (Sola HK)
Player of the year	(Norway) Henny Reistad ( (Denmark) Team Esbjerg)
Host	(Norway) Vipers Kristiansand

== Season statistics ==
=== Top goalscorers ===
As of 10 April 2022

Rank	Player	Club	Goals
1	(Norway) Christine Karlsen Alver	Fana	206
2	(Norway) Camilla Herrem	Sola HK	188
3	(Norway) Mona Obaidli	Molde Elite	183
4	(Norway) Emilie Hovden	Storhamar HE	153
5	(Norway) Guro Ramberg	Larvik HK	150
6	(Norway) Thale Rushfeldt Deila	Molde Elite	146
7	(Norway) Marielle Daae Nordvang	Aker Topphåndball	138
8	(Norway) Anniken Obaidli	Storhamar HE	137
9	(Denmark) Marianne Haugsted	Oppsal	134
10	(Norway) Maja Muri	Romerike Ravens	126

== Relegation play-off tournament ==
To determine the last available spot in REMA 1000-ligaen, play-off matches are played between the teams that ended as 9th, 10th and 11th in REMA 1000-ligaen's regular season and the teams who finished 2nd, 3rd and 4th in the 1. divisjon. Double league matches are played, and the two best teams in the REMA 1000-ligaen play-off will remain in the league. The team who finish last in the REMA 1000-ligaen play-off head face to face with the winner of the teams from the First division play-off, in two final qualifying matches.

=== Standings, REMA 1000-ligaen play-off ===
Pos	Team	Pld	W	D	L	GF	GA	GD	Pts	Qualification or relegation
1	Larvik HK (Note: +2 points and 5 points total)	4	1	1	2	94	97	−3	3	Remaining in REMA 1000-ligaen
2	Aker Topphåndball (Note: +1 points and 5 points total)	3	2	0	1	74	70	+4	4	Remaining in REMA 1000-ligaen
3	Tertnes HE (Note: +0 points and 3 points total)	2	1	1	0	51	49	+2	3	Play-off against the winner of the First Division play-off tournament

Updated to match(es) played on 5 May 2022. Source:
Rules for classification: The team ranked 9th in the regular season starts off the play-off tournament with 2 points, the team ranked 10th with 1 point and the team ranked 11th with 0 points. In the event of a tie in the standings in the play-off tournament, the team that is the highest placed from the regular season will be ranked ahead of the lower placed teams.

=== Results, REMA 1000-ligaen play-off ===
Home \ Away	AKT	LHK	TER
Aker Topphåndball		26–21	26–28
Larvik HK	21–22		29–26
Tertnes Håndball Elite	Cancelled	23–23	

Updated to match(es) played on 11 May 2022. Source: NHF
Legend: Blue = home team win; Yellow = draw; Red = away team win.

=== Standings, First Division play-off ===
Pos	Team	Pld	W	D	L	GF	GA	GD	Pts	Qualification or relegation
1	Gjerpen HK Skien (Note: +2 points and 7 points total)	3	2	1	0	82	70	+12	5	Play-off against the winner of REMA 1000-ligaen play-off tournament
2	Haslum Bærum Damer (Note: +1 points and 5 points total)	3	2	0	1	71	71	0	4	Remaining in First Division
3	Levanger HK (Note: +0 points and 1 points total)	4	0	1	3	92	105	−13	1	Remaining in First Division

Updated to match(es) played on 11 May 2022. Source:
Rules for classification: The team ranked 2nd in the regular season starts off the play-off tournament with 2 points, the team ranked 3rd with 1 point and the team ranked 4th with 0 points. In the event of a tie in the standings in the play-off tournament, the team that is the highest placed from the regular season will be ranked ahead of the lower placed teams.

=== Results, First Division play-off ===
Home \ Away	GJE	HAS	LEV
Gjerpen HK Skien		26–22	32–24
Haslum Bærum Damer	Cancelled		21–20
Levanger HK	24–24	24–28	

Updated to match(es) played on 11 May 2022. Source: NHF
Legend: Blue = home team win; Yellow = draw; Red = away team win.

=== Finale, REMA 1000-ligaen play-off ===
19 May; 18:45	Tertnes Håndball Elite	25–19	Gjerpen HK Skien	Åsane Arena, Bergen; Attendance: 677; Referees: Martinsen, Hansen
19 May; 18:45	Holtet 7	(14–9)	Westersjø 7	Åsane Arena, Bergen; Attendance: 677; Referees: Martinsen, Hansen
19 May; 18:45	1× (yellow card) 1× (suspension)	Report	2× (yellow card) 2× (suspension)	Åsane Arena, Bergen; Attendance: 677; Referees: Martinsen, Hansen

22 May
17:00
Gjerpen HK Skien
30–27 (ET)
Tertnes Håndball Elite
Skienshallen, Skien
Referees: Dasic, Husomanovic
Hjaltadottir, Westersjø 7
(10–9)
Frei 11
4× (suspension)
Report
3× (suspension)

FT: 23–23 ET: 7–4

25 May; 18:30	Tertnes Håndball Elite	36–19	Gjerpen HK Skien	Åsane Arena, Bergen; Attendance: 1,145; Referees: Fjeldskår, Fjellvang
25 May; 18:30	Hilby 9	(14–11)	Olsen 5	Åsane Arena, Bergen; Attendance: 1,145; Referees: Fjeldskår, Fjellvang
25 May; 18:30	1× (yellow card) 2× (suspension)	Report	1× (yellow card) 3× (suspension)	Åsane Arena, Bergen; Attendance: 1,145; Referees: Fjeldskår, Fjellvang

Tertnes Håndball Elite won series 2–1, and avoided from the relegation.
