= 2022–23 REMA 1000-ligaen (women's handball) =

Handball league season

REMA 1000-ligaen
- Season: 2022–23
- Champions: Vipers Kristiansand
- Relegated: Volda
- EHF Champions League: Vipers Kristiansand
- EHF European League: Larvik HK; Molde Elite; Sola HK; Storhamar HE
- Top goalscorer: Mona Obaidli (155 goals)
- Biggest home win: 23 goals: VIP 44–21 TER
- Biggest away win: 17 goals: LHK 18–35 VIP
- Highest scoring: 75 goals: VIP 44–31 BYÅ; MOL 33–42 VIP
- All statistics correct as of 23 May 2023.

The 2022–23 REMA 1000-ligaen was the 56th season of REMA 1000-ligaen, Norway's premier handball league.

== Team information ==
A total of 12 teams participated in the 2022/23 edition of REMA 1000-ligaen. 11 teams were qualified directly from the 2021/22 season. Only Volda Handball from 1. divisjon, was promoted to REMA 1000-ligaen.

| Team | Town | Arena | Capacity | Clubs locations in Norway |
| Aker Topphåndball | Oslo | Oppsal Arena / Ullern Flerbrukshall | 5,000 / 250 | Clubs locations in Norway |
| Byåsen Håndball Elite | Trondheim | Kolstad Arena | 2,500 | Clubs locations in Norway |
| Fana | Bergen | Fana Arena | 1,206 | Clubs locations in Norway |
| Fredrikstad Bkl. | Fredrikstad | Kongstenhallen | 1,500 | Clubs locations in Norway |
| Larvik HK | Larvik | Jotron Arena Larvik | 4,000 | Clubs locations in Norway |
| Molde Elite | Molde | Molde Arena | 2,000 | Clubs locations in Norway |
| Romerike Ravens | Rælingen | Skedsmohallen | 3,500 | Clubs locations in Norway |
| Sola HK | Sola | Åsenhallen | 1,200 | Clubs locations in Norway |
| Storhamar Håndball Elite | Hamar | Boligpartner Arena | 1,650 | Clubs locations in Norway |
| Tertnes Håndball Elite | Bergen | Åsane Arena | 2,220 | Clubs locations in Norway |
| Vipers Kristiansand | Kristiansand | Aqurama | 2,200 | Clubs locations in Norway |
| Volda Handball | Volda | Volda Campus Sparebank1 Arena | 2,200 | Clubs locations in Norway |

== Regular season ==
Usually, the team placing 12th will be relegated to the 1. divisjon, and the teams placing 9th, 10th and 11th will have to play a relegation playoff tournament. However, since next season will consist of 14 teams, only the team placed 12th will have to play relegation playoff matches this season, against the team placed 3rd in First Division.

=== Standings ===
| Pos | Team | Pld | W | D | L | GF | GA | GD | Pts | Qualification or relegation |
|---|---|---|---|---|---|---|---|---|---|---|
| 1 | Vipers Kristiansand | 22 | 22 | 0 | 0 | 819 | 562 | +257 | 44 | Championship play-offs |
| 2 | Storhamar HE | 22 | 14 | 3 | 5 | 683 | 580 | +103 | 31 | Championship play-offs |
| 3 | Sola HK | 22 | 14 | 1 | 7 | 618 | 583 | +35 | 29 | Championship play-offs |
| 4 | Molde Elite | 22 | 13 | 0 | 9 | 698 | 647 | +51 | 26 | Championship play-offs |
| 5 | Larvik HK | 22 | 11 | 3 | 8 | 627 | 611 | +16 | 25 | Championship play-offs |
| 6 | Fana | 22 | 12 | 0 | 10 | 622 | 613 | +9 | 24 | Championship play-offs |
| 7 | Fredrikstad BK | 22 | 11 | 1 | 10 | 615 | 648 | −33 | 23 | Championship play-offs |
| 8 | Byåsen HE | 22 | 10 | 1 | 11 | 618 | 637 | −19 | 21 | Championship play-offs |
| 9 | Romerike Ravens | 22 | 7 | 1 | 14 | 604 | 652 | −48 | 15 | |
| 10 | Tertnes HE | 22 | 6 | 0 | 16 | 597 | 674 | −77 | 12 | |
| 11 | Aker Topphåndball | 22 | 5 | 0 | 17 | 576 | 700 | −124 | 10 | |
| 12 | Volda Handball | 22 | 2 | 0 | 20 | 512 | 682 | −170 | 4 | Play-off against the third from First Division |

Updated to match(es) played on 29 March 2023. Source:
Rules for classification: 1.) Points in head-to-head matches amongst tied teams; 2.) Goal difference in head-to-head matches amongst tied teams; 3.) Goals scored in head-to-head matches among tied teams; 4.) Points in all matches; 5.) Goal difference in all matches.

=== Results ===
In the table below the home teams are listed on the left and the away teams along the top.

| Home \ Away | AKE | BYÅ | FAN | FBK | LHK | MOL | RAV | SOL | STO | TER | VIP | VOL |
|---|---|---|---|---|---|---|---|---|---|---|---|---|
| Aker Topphåndball | | 25–31 | 20–24 | 27–31 | 27–36 | 29–35 | 28–23 | 21–39 | 28–29 | 25–20 | 26–38 | 22–21 |
| Byåsen HE | 35–26 | | 31–28 | 29–34 | 23–26 | 24–29 | 32–28 | 28–25 | 26–29 | 39–31 | 21–37 | 33–23 |
| Fana | 35–19 | 28–27 | | 30–31 | 29–30 | 34–29 | 30–26 | 25–26 | 30–27 | 27–28 | 25–31 | 28–27 |
| Fredrikstad BK | 33–26 | 22–26 | 28–35 | | 27–27 | 30–37 | 32–25 | 37–26 | 22–27 | 22–32 | 28–33 | 25–24 |
| Larvik HK | 37–31 | 36–24 | 28–34 | 26–29 | | 30–26 | 24–23 | 23–22 | 29–29 | 26–29 | 18–35 | 35–26 |
| Molde Elite | 38–25 | 38–28 | 29–30 | 34–27 | 32–26 | | 27–34 | 23–30 | 25–27 | 31–28 | 33–42 | 38–21 |
| Romerike Ravens | 29–38 | 26–26 | 32–22 | 28–32 | 30–27 | 25–28 | | 31–32 | 20–33 | 31–29 | 25–40 | 36–22 |
| Sola HK | 31–23 | 25–23 | 32–25 | 25–26 | 23–32 | 29–23 | 28–27 | | 34–31 | 35–25 | 20–25 | 25–18 |
| Storhamar HE | 33–24 | 30–27 | 34–20 | 35–20 | 25–25 | 33–36 | 34–29 | 27–27 | | 37–22 | 31–36 | 39–21 |
| Tertnes HE | 33–25 | 27–31 | 24–34 | 27–31 | 30–27 | 33–37 | 22–28 | 27–30 | 22–27 | | 24–34 | 29–31 |
| Vipers Kristiansand | 42–30 | 44–31 | 36–20 | 46–27 | 32–29 | 40–32 | 41–19 | 36–25 | 35–30 | 44–21 | | 38–22 |
| Volda Handball | 27–31 | 20–23 | 18–29 | 23–21 | 25–30 | 22–38 | 25–29 | 27–29 | 22–36 | 22–34 | 25–34 | |

Updated to match(es) played on 29 March 2023. Source: NHF
Legend: Blue = home team win; Yellow = draw; Red = away team win.

== Championship play-offs ==
Best of three format is applied in all play-off stages, with the higher seeded team playing the first and third game (if necessary) at home. If a game ended with a draw after the regular time, it will proceed to two 5-minutes periods of extra time. If there is still a draw, another 2 × 5-minutes extra time will be played. If the scores are still level after two extra times, the winners are decided by a 7-meter shootout.

Top ranked teams from the regular season choose their opponents in the quarterfinal and semifinal stages. The remaining two highest ranked teams after the quarterfinal stage can not meet in the semifinals.

=== Bracket ===
Quarterfinals
1 | Vipers Kristiansand | 37 | 28
8 | Byåsen Håndball Elite | 26 | 26
2 | Storhamar Håndball Elite | 33 | 37
7 | Fredrikstad BK | 27 | 24
3 | Sola HK | 28 | 34
6 | Fana | 25 | 27
4 | Molde Elite | 32 | 28
5 | Larvik HK | 33 | 33

Semifinals
1 | Vipers Kristiansand | 43 | 37
5 | Larvik HK | 18 | 22
2 | Storhamar Håndball Elite | 27 | 28 | 25
3 | Sola HK | 29 | 27 | 24

Final
1 | Vipers Kristiansand | 32 | 32
2 | Storhamar Håndball Elite | 19 | 26

=== Quarterfinals ===
| 18 April; 18:30 | Vipers Kristiansand | 37–26 | Byåsen Håndball Elite | Aqurama, Kristiansand; Attendance: 763; Referees: Isachsen, Hell |
| 18 April; 18:30 | Ježić 7 | (20–13) | Hjertner 8 | Aqurama, Kristiansand; Attendance: 763; Referees: Isachsen, Hell |
| 18 April; 18:30 | 2× (yellow card) 1× (suspension) | Report | 1× (yellow card) 2× (suspension) | Aqurama, Kristiansand; Attendance: 763; Referees: Isachsen, Hell |

| 23 April; 15:00 | Byåsen Håndball Elite | 26–28 | Vipers Kristiansand | Melhushallen Nord, Melhus; Attendance: 650; Referees: Hoxha, Førsund |
| 23 April; 15:00 | Eklo 7 | (10–13) | Jeřábková 10 | Melhushallen Nord, Melhus; Attendance: 650; Referees: Hoxha, Førsund |
| 23 April; 15:00 | 1× (yellow card) 3× (suspension) | Report | 2× (yellow card) 1× (suspension) | Melhushallen Nord, Melhus; Attendance: 650; Referees: Hoxha, Førsund |

Vipers Kristiansand won series, 2–0.

| 19 April; 18:00 | Storhamar Håndball Elite | 33–27 | Fredrikstad BK | Boligpartner Arena, Hamar; Attendance: 607; Referees: Kalløkkebakken, Valbjør |
| 19 April; 18:00 | Zschocke 9 | (17–14) | Hulleberg 6 | Boligpartner Arena, Hamar; Attendance: 607; Referees: Kalløkkebakken, Valbjør |
| 19 April; 18:00 | 1× (yellow card) | Report | | Boligpartner Arena, Hamar; Attendance: 607; Referees: Kalløkkebakken, Valbjør |

| 23 April; 16:00 | Fredrikstad BK | 24–37 | Storhamar Håndball Elite | Kongstenhallen, Fredrikstad; Attendance: 500; Referees: Kvakic, Eriksen |
| 23 April; 16:00 | Hulleberg 5 | (13–17) | Obaidli 8 | Kongstenhallen, Fredrikstad; Attendance: 500; Referees: Kvakic, Eriksen |
| 23 April; 16:00 | 1× (yellow card) 1× (suspension) | Report | 1× (yellow card) 2× (suspension) | Kongstenhallen, Fredrikstad; Attendance: 500; Referees: Kvakic, Eriksen |

Storhamar Håndball Elite won series, 2–0.

| 19 April; 18:00 | Sola HK | 28–25 | Fana | Åsenhallen, Sola; Attendance: 493; Referees: Abrahamsen, Myhrstad |
| 19 April; 18:00 | Herrem, Tveiten 7 | (13–10) | Hatle 7 | Åsenhallen, Sola; Attendance: 493; Referees: Abrahamsen, Myhrstad |
| 19 April; 18:00 | 1× (yellow card) 1× (suspension) | Report | 2× (suspension) | Åsenhallen, Sola; Attendance: 493; Referees: Abrahamsen, Myhrstad |

| 23 April; 18:00 | Fana | 27–34 | Sola HK | Fana Arena, Nesttun; Attendance: 658; Referees: Tøraasen, Pettersen |
| 23 April; 18:00 | Kyrkjeeide 7 | (11–14) | Knutsen 7 | Fana Arena, Nesttun; Attendance: 658; Referees: Tøraasen, Pettersen |
| 23 April; 18:00 | 1× (yellow card) 1× (suspension) | Report | 1× (yellow card) 2× (suspension) | Fana Arena, Nesttun; Attendance: 658; Referees: Tøraasen, Pettersen |

Sola HK won series, 2–0.

| 19 April; 18:30 | Molde Elite | 32–33 | Larvik HK | Molde Arena, Molde; Attendance: 119; Referees: Holager, Aksdal |
| 19 April; 18:30 | M. Obaidli 11 | (16–15) | Sæteren 8 | Molde Arena, Molde; Attendance: 119; Referees: Holager, Aksdal |
| 19 April; 18:30 | 2× (yellow card) | Report | 2× (suspension) 1× (red card) | Molde Arena, Molde; Attendance: 119; Referees: Holager, Aksdal |

| 23 April; 17:15 | Larvik HK | 33–28 | Molde Elite | Jotron Arena Larvik, Larvik; Attendance: 439; Referees: Andresen, Wold |
| 23 April; 17:15 | H. Løke 8 | (14–11) | M. Obaidli 8 | Jotron Arena Larvik, Larvik; Attendance: 439; Referees: Andresen, Wold |
| 23 April; 17:15 | 1× (yellow card) 3× (suspension) | Report | 1× (yellow card) 3× (suspension) | Jotron Arena Larvik, Larvik; Attendance: 439; Referees: Andresen, Wold |

Larvik HK won series, 2–0.

=== Semifinals ===
| 3 May; 18:15 | Vipers Kristiansand | 43–18 | Larvik HK | Aqurama, Kristiansand; Attendance: 660; Referees: Dasic, Husomanovic |
| 3 May; 18:15 | Valle Dahl 10 | (20–8) | H. Løke 5 | Aqurama, Kristiansand; Attendance: 660; Referees: Dasic, Husomanovic |
| 3 May; 18:15 | 4× (suspension) | Report | 1× (yellow card) 5× (suspension) | Aqurama, Kristiansand; Attendance: 660; Referees: Dasic, Husomanovic |

| 11 May; 18:15 | Larvik HK | 22–37 | Vipers Kristiansand | Jotron Arena Larvik, Larvik; Attendance: 576; Referees: Fjeldskår, Fjellvang |
| 11 May; 18:15 | Kurtović, Rønning 5 | (12–19) | Hesselberg 7 | Jotron Arena Larvik, Larvik; Attendance: 576; Referees: Fjeldskår, Fjellvang |
| 11 May; 18:15 | 1× (yellow card) 1× (suspension) | Report | 1× (yellow card) 3× (suspension) | Jotron Arena Larvik, Larvik; Attendance: 576; Referees: Fjeldskår, Fjellvang |

Vipers Kristiansand won series, 2–0.

2 May
18:15
Storhamar Håndball Elite
27–29 (ET)
Sola HK
Boligpartner Arena, Hamar
Attendance: 1,057
Referees: Braseth, Sundet
Obaidli 10
(12–11)
Novak 9
1× (yellow card) 4× (suspension)
Report
1× (yellow card) 3× (suspension)

FT: 24–24 ET: 3–5

| 10 May; 18:15 | Sola HK | 27–28 | Storhamar Håndball Elite | Åsenhallen, Sola; Attendance: 1,086; Referees: Nygren, Borge |
| 10 May; 18:15 | Deila 7 | (12–12) | Zschocke 8 | Åsenhallen, Sola; Attendance: 1,086; Referees: Nygren, Borge |
| 10 May; 18:15 | 1× (yellow card) 1× (suspension) | Report | 2× (yellow card) 3× (suspension) | Åsenhallen, Sola; Attendance: 1,086; Referees: Nygren, Borge |

| 19 May; 20:15 | Storhamar Håndball Elite | 25–24 | Sola HK | Boligpartner Arena, Hamar; Attendance: 1,507; Referees: Nygren, Borge |
| 19 May; 20:15 | Abdulla 6 | (13–8) | Novak 8 | Boligpartner Arena, Hamar; Attendance: 1,507; Referees: Nygren, Borge |
| 19 May; 20:15 | 1× (yellow card) 5× (suspension) | Report | 1× (yellow card) 2× (suspension) | Boligpartner Arena, Hamar; Attendance: 1,507; Referees: Nygren, Borge |

Storhamar Håndball Elite won series, 2–1.

=== Finals ===
| 23 May; 18:15 | Vipers Kristiansand | 32–19 | Storhamar Håndball Elite | Aquarama, Kristiansand; Attendance: 944; Referees: Nygren, Borge |
| 23 May; 18:15 | Vyakhireva 7 | (17–7) | Obaidli 9 | Aquarama, Kristiansand; Attendance: 944; Referees: Nygren, Borge |
| 23 May; 18:15 | 1× (yellow card) 2× (suspension) | Report | 1× (suspension) | Aquarama, Kristiansand; Attendance: 944; Referees: Nygren, Borge |

| 27 May; 18:15 | Storhamar Håndball Elite | 26–32 | Vipers Kristiansand | Boligpartner Arena, Hamar; Attendance: 887; Referees: Johannessen, Larsen |
| 27 May; 18:15 | Obaidli 9 | (17–13) | Roberts 10 | Boligpartner Arena, Hamar; Attendance: 887; Referees: Johannessen, Larsen |
| 27 May; 18:15 | 1× (yellow card) | Report | 2× (yellow card) 2× (suspension) | Boligpartner Arena, Hamar; Attendance: 887; Referees: Johannessen, Larsen |

Vipers Kristiansand won series, 2–0.

== Awards ==
=== All Star Team and other awards ===
The All Star Team and other awards were announced the last days of May 2023, starting on May 15.

| Position | Player |
|---|---|
| Goalkeeper | (Norway) Olivia Lykke Nygaard (Fana) |
| Left wing | (Norway) Kristin Venn (Storhamar HE) |
| Left back | (Norway) Maja Furu Sæteren (Larvik HK) |
| Centre back | (Norway) Anniken Obaidli (Storhamar HE) |
| Right back | (Russia) Anna Vyakhireva (Vipers Kristiansand) |
| Right wing | (Czech Republic) Jana Knedlíková (Vipers Kristiansand) |
| Pivot | (Norway) Caroline Aar Jakobsen (Byåsen HE) |
| Rookie | (Norway) Maja Furu Sæteren (Larvik HK) |
| Public favorite | (Russia) Anna Vyakhireva (Vipers Kristiansand) |
| Defense player | (Norway) Martha Barka (Sola HK) |
| MVP | (Russia) Anna Vyakhireva (Vipers Kristiansand) |
| Player of the year | (Norway) Henny Reistad ( (Denmark) Team Esbjerg) |
| Host | (Norway) Vipers Kristiansand |

== Season statistics ==
=== Top goalscorers ===
As of 29 March 2023

| Rank | Player | Club | Goals |
|---|---|---|---|
| 1 | (Norway) Mona Obaidli | Molde Elite | 155 |
| 2 | (Norway) Maja Furu Sæteren | Larvik HK | 144 |
| 3 | (Norway) Anniken Wollik | Romerike Ravens | 139 |
| 4 | (Norway) Sara Berg | Fana | 137 |
| 5 | (Norway) Anniken Obaidli | Storhamar HE | 130 |
| 6 | (Norway) Maja Muri | Romerike Ravens | 129 |
| 7 | (Norway) Aurora Kjellevold Hatle | Fana | 124 |
| 8 | (Norway) Emma Holtet | Tertnes HE | 122 |
| 9 | (Norway) Amanda Kurtović | Larvik HK | 116 |
| 9 | (Denmark) Freja Vinther Christensen | Aker Topphåndball | 116 |

== Relegation play-off ==
To determine the last available spot in REMA 1000-ligaen, play-off matches are played between the team that ended 12th in REMA 1000-ligaen's regular season and the team who finished 3rd in 1. divisjon.

=== Matches ===
| 10 May; 18:30 | Volda | 21–28 | Oppsal | Volda Campus Sparebank1, Volda; Attendance: 766; Referees: Holager, Aksdal |
| 10 May; 18:30 | Græsdal 4 | (11–17) | Løken 10 | Volda Campus Sparebank1, Volda; Attendance: 766; Referees: Holager, Aksdal |
| 10 May; 18:30 | 4× (suspension) | Report | 3× (suspension) | Volda Campus Sparebank1, Volda; Attendance: 766; Referees: Holager, Aksdal |

| 14 May; 16:00 | Oppsal | 30–33 | Volda | Oppsal Arena, Oslo; Attendance: 738; Referees: Tøraasen, Pettersen |
| 14 May; 16:00 | Stensrud 8 | (18–15) | Andriichuk 12 | Oppsal Arena, Oslo; Attendance: 738; Referees: Tøraasen, Pettersen |
| 14 May; 16:00 | 4× (suspension) | Report | 3× (suspension) | Oppsal Arena, Oslo; Attendance: 738; Referees: Tøraasen, Pettersen |

20 May
17:00
Volda
33–34 (ET)
Oppsal
Volda Campus Sparebank1, Volda
Attendance: 787
Referees: Andresen, Wold
Stølen 8
(14–12)
Stensrud 15
2× (yellow card) 3× (suspension)
Report

FT: 25–25 ET: 5–5, 3–4

Oppsal won series, 2–1 and were promoted to REMA 1000-ligaen, Volda were relegated to 1. division.
