= 2019–20 REMA 1000-ligaen (women's handball) =

REMA 1000-ligaen
- Season: 2019–20
- Champions: Vipers Kristiansand (3rd title)
- Relegated: Follo HK Damer; Gjerpen HK
- EHF Champions League: Vipers Kristiansand
- EHF European League: Storhamar HE; Byåsen HE; Tertnes HE; Molde Elite
- Matches: 146
- Goals: 7,119 (48.76 per match)
- Top goalscorer: Emilie Hovden (161 goals)
- Biggest home win: 20 goals: STO 40–20 AKT
- Biggest away win: 15 goals: FHK 18–33 VIP; AKT 24–39 VIP
- Highest scoring: 71 goals: VIP 42–29 FBK
- All statistics correct as of 11 March 2020.

The 2019–20 REMA 1000-ligaen is the 53rd season of REMA 1000-ligaen, Norway's premier handball league.

== Team information ==
A total of 12 teams will be participating in the 2019/20 edition of REMA 1000-ligaen. 9 teams were qualified directly from the 2018/19 season. The three top ranked teams from the 1. divisjon, Sola HK, Aker Topphåndball and Follo HK Damer were promoted to REMA 1000-ligaen.

| Team | Town | Arena | Capacity | Clubs locations in Norway |
| Aker Topphåndball | Oslo | Ullern Flerbrukshall | 250 | Clubs locations in Norway |
| Byåsen Elite | Trondheim | Trondheim Spektrum | 8900 | Clubs locations in Norway |
| Fana | Bergen | Fana Arena | 1206 | Clubs locations in Norway |
| Follo HK Damer | Follo | Stil Arena | 2500 | Clubs locations in Norway |
| Fredrikstad BK | Fredrikstad | Kongstenhallen | 1500 | Clubs locations in Norway |
| Gjerpen HK | Skien | Gjerpenhallen | 300 | Clubs locations in Norway |
| Molde Elite | Molde | Molde Arena | 2000 | Clubs locations in Norway |
| Oppsal | Oslo | Oppsal Arena | 5000 | Clubs locations in Norway |
| Sola HK | Sola | Åsenhallen | 1200 | Clubs locations in Norway |
| Storhamar Elite | Hamar | Boligpartner Arena | 1650 | Clubs locations in Norway |
| Tertnes Elite | Bergen | Haukelandshallen | 5000 | Clubs locations in Norway |
| Vipers Kristiansand | Kristiansand | Aquarama | 2200 | Clubs locations in Norway |

== Regular season ==
The season was stopped on 12 March 2020.

=== Standings ===
| Pos | Team | Pld | W | D | L | GF | GA | GD | Pts | Qualification or relegation |
|---|---|---|---|---|---|---|---|---|---|---|
| 1 | Vipers Kristiansand | 21 | 20 | 0 | 1 | 727 | 543 | +184 | 40 | Championship play-offs + advance to Champions League |
| 2 | Storhamar HE | 22 | 18 | 2 | 2 | 682 | 542 | +140 | 38 | Championship play-offs (cancelled due to the COVID-19 pandemic) |
| 3 | Byåsen HE | 22 | 14 | 2 | 6 | 622 | 578 | +44 | 30 | Championship play-offs (cancelled due to the COVID-19 pandemic) |
| 4 | Tertnes HE | 22 | 14 | 2 | 6 | 648 | 593 | +55 | 30 | Championship play-offs (cancelled due to the COVID-19 pandemic) |
| 5 | Molde Elite | 22 | 12 | 1 | 9 | 578 | 559 | +19 | 25 | Championship play-offs (cancelled due to the COVID-19 pandemic) |
| 6 | Fana | 22 | 10 | 0 | 12 | 597 | 605 | −8 | 20 | Championship play-offs (cancelled due to the COVID-19 pandemic) |
| 7 | Aker Topphåndball | 21 | 9 | 1 | 11 | 546 | 581 | −35 | 19 | Championship play-offs (cancelled due to the COVID-19 pandemic) |
| 8 | Fredrikstad BK | 22 | 8 | 3 | 11 | 593 | 621 | −28 | 19 | Championship play-offs (cancelled due to the COVID-19 pandemic) |
| 9 | Oppsal | 21 | 7 | 1 | 13 | 519 | 559 | −40 | 15 | |
| 10 | Sola HK | 22 | 5 | 1 | 16 | 611 | 641 | −30 | 11 | Play-off against the third from First Division (cancelled due to the COVID-19 pandemic) |
| 11 | Follo HK Damer | 22 | 3 | 1 | 18 | 533 | 679 | −146 | 7 | Relegated to First Division |
| 12 | Gjerpen HK | 21 | 3 | 0 | 18 | 463 | 618 | −155 | 6 | Relegated to First Division |

Updated to match(es) played on 11 March 2020. Source:
Rules for classification: 1.) Points in head-to-head matches amongst tied teams; 2.) Goal difference in head-to-head matches amongst tied teams; 3.) Goals scored in head-to-head matches among tied teams; 4.) Points in all matches; 5.) Goal difference in all matches.

== Championship playoffs ==
Cancelled due to the COVID-19 pandemic.

== Awards ==
=== All Star Team and other awards ===
The All Star Team and other awards were announced on 9 June 2020.

| Position | Player |
|---|---|
| Goalkeeper | (Netherlands) Annick Lipman (Byåsen HE) |
| Left wing | (Norway) Camilla Herrem (Sola HK) |
| Left back | (Norway) Thale Rushfeldt Deila (Fredrikstad BK) |
| Centre back | (Norway) Julie Bøe Jacobsen (Byåsen HE) |
| Right back | (Norway) Anna Bjørke Kallestad (Byåsen HE) |
| Right wing | (Norway) Emilie Hovden (Storhamar HE) |
| Pivot | (Norway) Heidi Løke (Vipers Kristiansand) |
| Rookie | (Norway) Eli Smørgrav Skogstrand (Tertnes HE) |
| MVP | (Norway) Emilie Hovden (Storhamar HE) |
| Host | (Norway) Vipers Kristiansand |

== Season statistics ==
=== Top goalscorers ===
==== Regular season ====
As of 11 March 2020

| Rank | Player | Club | Goals |
|---|---|---|---|
| 1 | (Norway) Emilie Hovden | Storhamar HE | 161 |
| 2 | (Norway) Malin Holta | Sola HK | 147 |
| 3 | (Norway) Christine Karlsen Alver | Fana | 132 |
| 4 | (Norway) Linn Gossé | Tertnes HE | 128 |
| 5 | (Norway) Heidi Løke | Vipers Kristiansand | 126 |
| 6 | (Norway) Thale Rushfeldt Deila | Fredrikstad BK | 117 |
| 7 | (Norway) Julie Bøe Jacobsen | Byåsen HE | 112 |
| 8 | (Norway) Marielle Martinsen | Aker Topphåndball | 108 |
| 9 | (Norway) Camilla Herrem | Sola HK | 107 |
| 10 | (Norway) Karoline Lund | Aker Topphåndball | 99 |

== Relegation playoff ==
Cancelled due to the COVID-19 pandemic.
