= 2020–21 REMA 1000-ligaen (women's handball) =

REMA 1000-ligaen
- Season: 2020–21
- Champions: Vipers Kristiansand
- Relegated: N/A
- EHF Champions League: Vipers Kristiansand
- EHF European League: Storhamar HE; Sola HK; Tertnes HE
- Top goalscorer: Malin Holta (75 goals)
- Biggest home win: 26 goals: VIP 45–19 OPP
- Biggest away win: 24 goals: AKT 23–47 VIP
- Highest scoring: 73 goals: BYÅ 33–40 FAN
- All statistics correct as of 11 May 2021.

The 2020–21 REMA 1000-ligaen was the 54th season of REMA 1000-ligaen, Norway's premier handball league.

== Team information ==
A total of 13 teams will be participating in the 2020/21 edition of REMA 1000-ligaen. 10 teams were qualified directly from the 2019/20 season. The three top ranked teams from the 1. divisjon, Larvik HK, Flint Tønsberg and Rælingen HK were promoted to REMA 1000-ligaen. (Note: Usually the league consists of twelve teams, but due to the COVID-19 pandemic the current 2020/2021-season consists of thirteen team since last years season wasn't fully played.)

Team	Town	Arena	Capacity	Clubs locations in Norway
Aker Topphåndball	Oslo	Ullern Flerbrukshall	250	Clubs locations in Norway
Byåsen Håndball Elite	Trondheim	Trondheim Spektrum	8900	Clubs locations in Norway
Fana	Bergen	Fana Arena	1206	Clubs locations in Norway
Flint Tønsberg	Tønsberg	Slagenhallen	700	Clubs locations in Norway
Fredrikstad BK	Fredrikstad	Kongstenhallen	1500	Clubs locations in Norway
Larvik HK	Larvik	Jotron Arena Larvik	4000	Clubs locations in Norway
Molde Elite	Molde	Molde Arena	2000	Clubs locations in Norway
Oppsal	Oslo	Oppsal Arena	5000	Clubs locations in Norway
Rælingen HK	Rælingen	Marikollhallen	175	Clubs locations in Norway
Sola HK	Sola	Åsenhallen	1200	Clubs locations in Norway
Storhamar Håndball Elite	Hamar	Boligpartner Arena	1650	Clubs locations in Norway
Tertnes Elite	Bergen	Haukelandshallen	5000	Clubs locations in Norway
Vipers Kristiansand	Kristiansand	Aquarama	2200	Clubs locations in Norway

== Regular season ==
Several changes due to the ongoing COVID-19-pandemic had effect on this season. The first plan was the season would only be half-played, and no teams would directly be relegated to the First Division. Changes also applied to the Championship play-offs and order of the teams in the play-offs to First Division. On 19 April, these plans were cancelled and changed yet again. Now, only one match will be played, and the winner of the match between Vipers Kristiansand and Storhamar HE will determine the winner of the league. The other placings will be adjusted to their average placement. No teams will be relegated to the First Division and from the First Division, meaning 2021–22 REMA 1000-ligaen will consist of 14 teams and the First Division of 11 teams next season. All play-offs are cancelled. The qualification for the Women's EHF Champions League and the Women's EHF European Cup will be given to the teams selected, based on results of the current season, previous season and the current season's Norwegian Cup, but mainly based on the previous season.

=== Standings ===
Pos	Team	Pld	W	D	L	GF	GA	GD	Pts	Qualification or relegation
1	Vipers Kristiansand	11	11	0	0	418	248	+170	22	Advance to Champions League
2	Storhamar HE	12	11	0	1	345	290	+55	22	Advance to EHF European League
3	Sola HK (Note: The placement was adjusted to the teams' average of 1.60)	10	8	0	2	298	263	+35	16	Advance to EHF European League
4	Molde Elite (Note: The placement was adjusted to the teams' average of 1.40)	10	7	0	3	268	229	+39	14	Advance to EHF European League
5	Tertnes HE (Note: The placement was adjusted to the teams' average of 1.25)	12	7	1	4	363	324	+39	15	Advance to EHF European League
6	Fana (Note: The placement was adjusted to the teams' average of 1.00)	11	5	1	5	315	315	0	11	
7	Fredrikstad BK (Note: The placement was adjusted to the teams' average of 0.90)	10	4	1	5	259	266	−7	9	
8	Byåsen HE (Note: The placement was adjusted to the teams' average of 0.73)	11	4	0	7	273	326	−53	8	
9	Aker Topphåndball (Note: The placement was adjusted to the teams' average of 0.67)	9	3	0	6	235	269	−34	6	
10	Flint Tønsberg (Note: The placement was adjusted to the teams' average of 0.64)	11	3	1	7	248	301	−53	7	
11	Oppsal (Note: The placement was adjusted to the teams' average of 0.42)	12	2	1	9	274	332	−58	5	
12	Rælingen HK (Note: The placement was adjusted to the teams' average of 0.36)	11	2	0	9	265	335	−70	4	
13	Larvik HK (Note: The placement was adjusted to the teams' average of 0.10)	10	0	1	9	230	293	−63	1	

Updated to match(es) played on 11 May 2021. Source:
Rules for classification: 1.) Points in head-to-head matches amongst tied teams; 2.) Goal difference in head-to-head matches amongst tied teams; 3.) Goals scored in head-to-head matches among tied teams; 4.) Points in all matches; 5.) Goal difference in all matches.

=== Results ===
In the table below the home teams are listed on the left and the away teams along the top.

Home \ Away	AKT	BYÅ	FAN	FLT	FBK	LHK	MOL	OPP	RHK	SOL	STO	TER	VIP
Aker Topphåndball		23–26	31–22	23–27	25–27	Cancelled	25–32	Cancelled	Cancelled	Cancelled	Cancelled	Cancelled	24–47
Byåsen Elite	Cancelled		33–40	Cancelled	Cancelled	28–26	Cancelled	Cancelled	28–30	Cancelled	20–35	20–31	21–33
Fana	Cancelled	Cancelled		Cancelled	26–22	Cancelled	Cancelled	36–30	33–25	Cancelled	23–24	31–31	Cancelled
Flint Tønsberg	Cancelled	Cancelled	28–25		Cancelled	22–18	Cancelled	Cancelled	20–23	Cancelled	15–29	Cancelled	21–36
Fredrikstad BK	Cancelled	31–23	Cancelled	31–22		Cancelled	Cancelled	Cancelled	Cancelled	25–26	Cancelled	Cancelled	22–33
Larvik HK	Cancelled	Cancelled	20–32	Cancelled	24–24		Cancelled	16–21	Cancelled	Cancelled	25–29	31–35	Cancelled
Molde Elite	Cancelled	24–25	26–23	32–25	Cancelled	30–23		Cancelled	31–20	Cancelled	Cancelled	Cancelled	Cancelled
Oppsal	23–24	22–27	Cancelled	16–16	27–30	Cancelled	16–28		Cancelled	24–32	Cancelled	Cancelled	Cancelled
Rælingen HK	24–30	Cancelled	Cancelled	Cancelled	24–28	Cancelled	Cancelled	22–26		26–32	23–28	29–34	Cancelled
Sola HK	Cancelled	32–23	Cancelled	35–26	Cancelled	31–21	26–20	Cancelled	Cancelled		Cancelled	Cancelled	25–34
Storhamar Håndball Elite	34–29	Cancelled	Cancelled	Cancelled	26–24	Cancelled	24–21	32–26	Cancelled	33–26		26–24	Cancelled
Tertnes Håndball Elite	34–26	Cancelled	Cancelled	33–26	35–22	Cancelled	22–24	35–21	Cancelled	31–33	Cancelled		Cancelled
Vipers Kristiansand	Cancelled	Cancelled	45–24	Cancelled	Cancelled	41–26	Cancelled	35–23	45–19	Cancelled	34–25	35–18	

Updated to match(es) played on 11 May 2021. Source:
Legend: Blue = home team win; Yellow = draw; Red = away team win.

== Championship playoffs ==
Cancelled due to the COVID-19 restrictions in Norway.

== Awards ==
=== All Star Team and other awards ===
The All Star Team and other awards were announced on 25 May 2021.

Position	Player
Goalkeeper	(Norway) Katrine Lunde (Vipers Kristiansand)
Left wing	(Norway) Camilla Herrem (Sola HK)
Left back	(Norway) Malin Holta (Sola HK)
Centre back	(Norway) Henny Reistad (Vipers Kristiansand)
Right back	(Norway) Maja Jakobsen (Storhamar HE)
Right wing	(Norway) Tuva Høve (Aker Topphåndball)
Pivot	(Norway) Heidi Løke (Vipers Kristiansand)
Rookie	(Norway) Andrea Holm Aune (Byåsen HE)
MVP	(Norway) Henny Reistad (Vipers Kristiansand)
Player of the year	(Norway) Henny Reistad (Vipers Kristiansand)
Host	Not awarded

== Season statistics ==
=== Top goalscorers ===
As of 11 May 2021

Rank	Player	Club	Goals
1	(Norway) Malin Holta	Sola HK	75
2	(Norway) Mari Finstad Bergum	Flint Tønsberg	72
3	(Norway) Linn Gossé	Tertnes HE	67
4	(Norway) Camilla Herrem	Sola HK	65
5	(Norway) Mathilde Rivas Toft	Molde Elite	61
6	(Norway) Maja Jakobsen	Storhamar HE	60
7	(Norway) Thale Rushfeldt Deila	Fredrikstad BK	58
8	(Norway) Anniken Obaidli	Molde Elite	56
9	(Norway) Heidi Løke	Vipers Kristiansand	54
10	(Norway) Andrea Holm Aune	Byåsen HE	52
10	(Norway) Anniken Wollik	Rælingen HK	52

== Relegation playoff ==
Cancelled due to the COVID-19 restrictions in Norway.
