= 2026–27 Elkjøp-ligaen (women's handball) =

Elkjøp-ligaen
- Season: 2026–27
- Top goalscorer: Maja Furu Sæteren (89 goals)
- Biggest home win: 17 goals: STO 35–18 GJE
- Biggest away win: 16 goals: FOL 24–40 LHK
- Highest scoring: 73 goals: BYÅ 34–39 LHK; SOL 39–34 FOL
- All statistics correct as of 12 November 2026.

The 2026–27 Elkjøp-ligaen is the 60th season of Elkjøp-ligaen, Norway's premier handball league.

== Teams ==
Locations of the 2026/27 Elkjøp-ligaen teams

=== Team changes ===
Promoted from First Division	Relegated from 2024–25 REMA 1000-ligaen
Flint Tønsberg; Utleira IL	Ravens; Haslum

=== Stadiums ===
Team	Location	Arena	Capacity
Byåsen HE	Trondheim	Kolstad Arena	2,500
Fana Håndball	Bergen	Fana Arena	1,206
Fjellhammer IL	Lørenskog	Fjellhamar Arena	1,700
Flint Tønsberg	Tønsberg	REMA 1000 Arena	700
Follo HK Damer	Ski	Stil Arena	2,500
Fredrikstad BK	Fredrikstad	Kongstenhallen	1,500
Gjerpen Håndball	Skien	Gjerpenhallen	300
Larvik HK	Larvik	Jotron Arena Larvik	4,000
Molde Elite	Molde	Molde Arena	2,000
Oppsal Håndball	Oslo	Oppsal Arena	5,000
Sola HK	Sola	Åsenhallen	1,200
Storhamar HE	Hamar	Boligpartner Arena	1,650
Tertnes HE	Bergen	Åsane Arena	2,220
Utleira IL	Trondheim	Utleirahallen	400

== Regular season ==
The teams placed 12th and 13th will have to play relegation playoff matches this season, against the teams placed 2nd and 3rd in the first division. The team placed 14th will be relegated to the first division.

=== Standings ===
Pos	Team	Pld	W	D	L	GF	GA	GD	Pts	Qualification or relegation
1	Larvik	10	9	0	1	340	278	+62	18	Championship play-offs
2	Fredrikstad	10	7	2	1	305	267	+38	16	Championship play-offs
3	Sola	9	7	1	1	285	232	+53	15	Championship play-offs
4	Molde	10	7	0	3	284	239	+45	14	Championship play-offs
5	Storhamar	10	7	0	3	279	232	+47	14	Championship play-offs
6	Tertnes	10	6	0	4	319	291	+28	12	Championship play-offs
7	Fjellhammer	9	5	2	2	271	253	+18	12	Championship play-offs
8	Byåsen	9	4	2	3	241	232	+9	10	Championship play-offs
9	Follo	10	3	1	6	285	319	−34	7	
10	Gjerpen	10	3	0	7	238	297	−59	6	
11	Fana	9	2	2	5	242	257	−15	6	
12	Oppsal	9	1	0	8	236	292	−56	2	Play-off against the 2nd and 3rd from First Division
13	Utleira	9	1	0	8	208	267	−59	2	Play-off against the 2nd and 3rd from First Division
14	Flint Tønsberg	10	0	0	10	255	332	−77	0	Relegated to First Division

Updated to match(es) played on 12 November 2026. Source:
Rules for classification: 1.) Points in head-to-head matches amongst tied teams; 2.) Goal difference in head-to-head matches amongst tied teams; 3.) Goals scored in head-to-head matches among tied teams; 4.) Points in all matches; 5.) Goal difference in all matches.

=== Results ===
In the table below the home teams are listed on the left and the away teams along the top.

Home \ Away	BYÅ	FAN	FIL	FLI	FOL	FBK	GJE	LHK	MOL	OPP	SOL	STO	TER	UTL
Byåsen				32–18				34–39	27–26					27–17
Fana						29–30				32–25			27–31	
Fjellhammer		34–34				29–29					20–29			34–27
Flint Tønsberg		23–28	26–35				29–30					25–36		24–28
Follo		28–28	28–29	31–28				24–40	32–29					
Fredrikstad	25–25			38–28	31–24					33–26				
Gjerpen	16–22	24–21	28–31			30–35				29–27				
Larvik		31–23		41–29			35–25		35–25			27–25		25–21
Molde		31–20	26–23			31–18						21–18	30–20	32–23
Oppsal			26–36	33–25	28–33				23–33					
Sola	25–25				39–34	33–20		38–29		35–24				
Storhamar	28–21				28–21	22–29	35–18				26–23		35–27	
Tertnes	38–28				39–30		31–20	34–38		36–24	27–35			
Utleira						21–35					27–28	20–26	24–36	

Updated to match(es) played on 12 November 2026. Source: NHF
Legend: Blue = home team win; Yellow = draw; Red = away team win.

== Championship play-offs ==
Best of three format is applied in all play-off stages, with the higher seeded team playing the first and third game (if necessary) at home. If a game ended with a draw after the regular time, it will proceed to two 5-minutes periods of extra time. If there is still a draw, another 2 × 5-minutes extra time will be played. If the scores are still level after two extra times, the winners are decided by a 7-meter shootout.

== Season statistics ==
=== Top goalscorers ===
As of 12 November 2026

Rank	Player	Club	Goals
1	(Norway) Maja Furu Sæteren	Larvik	89
2	(Norway) Sarah Deari Solheim	Fjellhammer	67
3	(Norway) Camilla Herrem	Sola	64
4	(Norway) Anette Sundfær Johnsen	Follo	60
5	(Norway) Aurora Kjellevold Hatle	Fana	55
5	(Norway) Nora Rosenberg	Tertnes	55
5	(Denmark) Alberte Ebler	Fredrikstad	55
8	(Norway) Amalie Mogstad	Flint	54
9	(Norway) Neah Kyrkjebø Lynghjem	Follo	51
10	(Norway) Sofie Fosnæss Hanssen	Fjellhammer	49
10	(Norway) Synne Olsen	Utleira	49

== Relegation play-off ==
To determine the last two available spots in Elkjøp-ligaen, play-off matches are played between the teams that ended 12th and 13th in Elkjøp-ligaen's regular season and the teams placed 2nd and 3rd in the first division.
