= 2022–23 Women's EHF European League =

European handball tournament

Women's EHF European League
- 2022–23
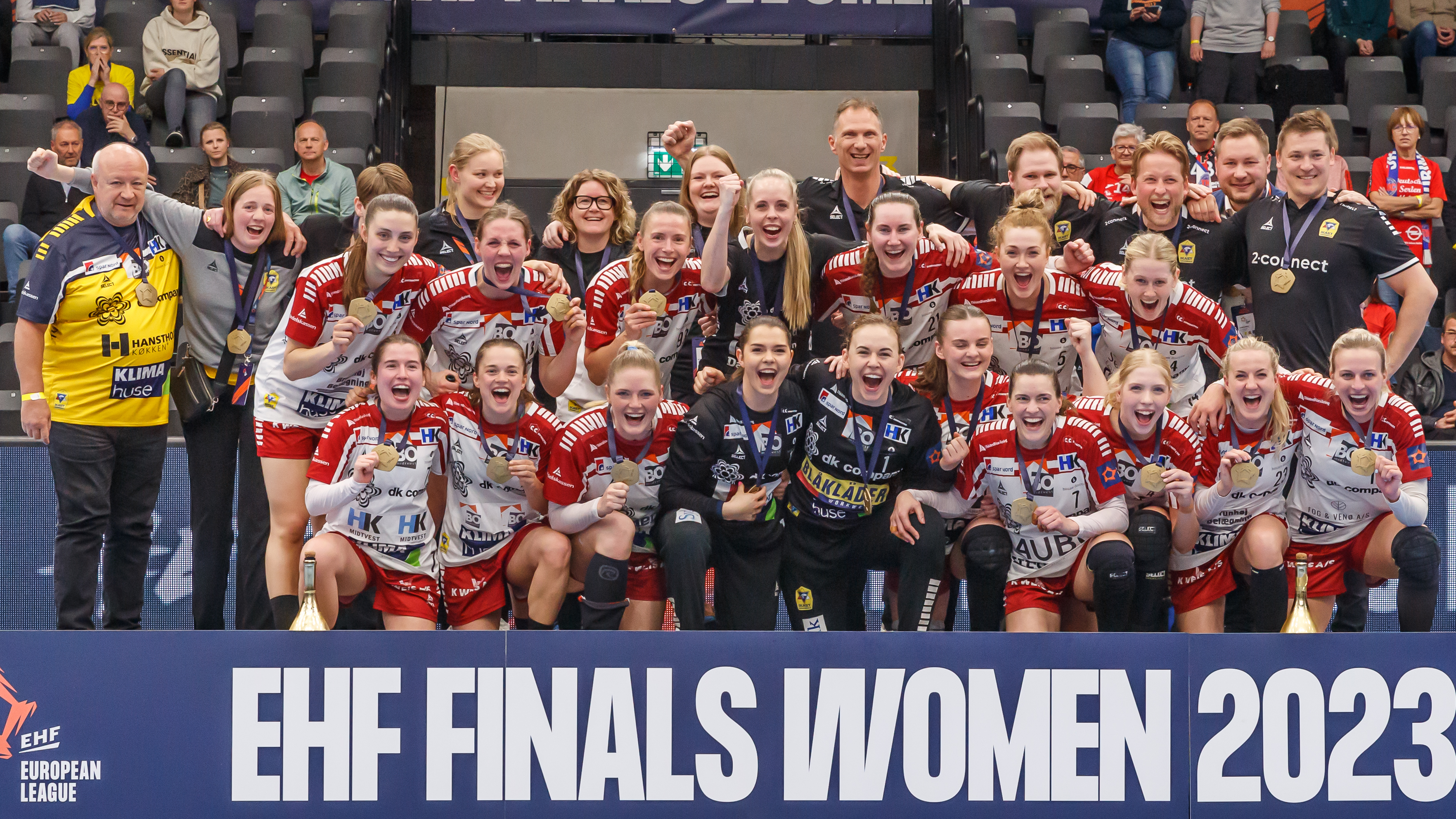
- Ikast Håndbold celebrates

Tournament information
- Sport: Handball
- Dates: 8 October 2022–14 May 2023
- Teams: 33 (qualification stage); 16 (group stage)
- Website: ehfel.com

Final positions
- Champions: (Denmark) Ikast Håndbold
- Runner-up: (Denmark) Nykøbing Falster Håndbold

Tournament statistics
- Matches played: 60
- Attendance: 85,355 (1,423 per match)
- MVP: (Denmark) Emma Friis
- Top scorer(s): (Germany) Annika Lott (86 goals)

The 2022–23 Women's EHF European League was the 42nd edition of the European Handball Federation,s EHF's second-tier women's handball competition, running from 8 October 2022 to 14 May 2023.

SG BBM Bietigheim entered the reason as the defending champions.

== Overview ==
=== Team allocation ===
Group stage
| (Denmark) Ikast Håndbold | (Hungary) DVSC Schaeffler | (France) Paris 92 | (Norway) Molde Elite |
Round 3
| (Croatia) Podravka Vegeta | (Denmark) Viborg HK | (France) ESBF Besançon | (France) Neptunes de Nantes |
| (Germany) Borussia Dortmund | (Germany) Buxtehuder SV | (Hungary) Motherson Mosonmagyaróvár | (Hungary) Praktiker-Vác |
| (Norway) Sola HK | (Poland) MKS Zagłębie Lubin | (Romania) CS Măgura Cisnădie | (Romania) SCM Râmnicu Vâlcea |
| (Spain) Super Amara Bera Bera | (Sweden) H65 Höörs HK | (Sweden) IK Sävehof | |
Round 2
| (Austria) Hypo Niederösterreich | (Croatia) HC Dalmatinka Ploce | (Croatia) ŽRK Bjelovar | (Czech Republic) DHC Plzeň |
| (Denmark) Nykøbing Falster Håndbold | (France) Chambray Touraine | (Germany) Thüringer HC | (Germany) VfL Oldenburg |
| (Hungary) Siófok KC | (Norway) Fana | (Poland) MKS FunFloor Perła Lublin | (Romania) SCM Gloria Buzău |
| (Serbia) ZRK Zeleznicar – Indjija | (Spain) Costa del Sol Malaga | (Spain) Rocasa Gran Canaria | (Switzerland) LC Brühl Handball |
| (Switzerland) SPONO Eagles | (Turkey) Yalikavksports Club | | |

== Round and draw dates ==
The schedule of the competition was as follows (all draws were held at the EHF headquarters in Vienna, Austria).

| Phase | Round | Draw date | First leg | Second leg |
|---|---|---|---|---|
| Qualification | Second qualifying round | 19 July 2022 | 8–9 October 2022 | 15–16 October 2022 |
| Qualification | Third qualifying round | 18 October 2022 | 3–4 December 2022 | 10–11 December 2022 |
| Group stage | Matchday 1 | 15 December 2022 | 7–8 January 2023 | |
| Group stage | Matchday 2 | 15 December 2022 | 14–15 January 2023 | |
| Group stage | Matchday 3 | 15 December 2022 | 21–22 January 2023 | |
| Group stage | Matchday 4 | 15 December 2022 | 4–5 February 2023 | |
| Group stage | Matchday 5 | 15 December 2022 | 11–12 February 2023 | |
| Group stage | Matchday 6 | 15 December 2022 | 18–19 February 2023 | |
| Knockout phase | Quarter-finals | no draw | 18–19 March 2023 | 25–26 March 2023 |
| Knockout phase | Semi finals | 28 March 2023 | 13 May 2023 | |
| Knockout phase | Final | no draw | 14 May 2023 | |

== Qualification stage ==
=== Round 2 ===
There were 18 teams participating in round 2. The first legs were played on 8–9 October and the second legs were played on 15–16 October 2022.

| Team 1 | Agg. | Team 2 | 1st leg | 2nd leg |
|---|---|---|---|---|
| Chambray Touraine (France) | 52–58 | (Germany) Thüringer HC | 28–31 | 24–27 |
| LC Brühl Handball (Switzerland) | 58–52 | (Czech Republic) DHC Plzeň | 30–27 | 28–25 |
| SCM Gloria Buzău (Romania) | 42–31 | (Spain) Costa del Sol Malaga | 32–31 | 10–0 |
| MKS FunFloor Perła Lublin (Poland) | 50–58 | (Hungary) Siófok KC | 18–27 | 32–31 |
| Rocasa Gran Canaria (Spain) | 79–41 | (Croatia) ŽRK Bjelovar | 42–19 | 37–22 |
| Hypo Niederösterreich (Austria) | 49–57 | (Germany) VfL Oldenburg | 26–33 | 23–24 |
| Yalikavksports Club (Turkey) | 45–66 | (Denmark) Nykøbing Falster Håndbold | 21–29 | 24–37 |
| HC Dalmatinka Ploce (Croatia) | 55–61 | (Serbia) ŽRK Železničar Inđija | 25–32 | 30–29 |
| SPONO Eagles (Switzerland) | 52–64 | (Norway) Fana | 21–36 | 31–28 |

=== Round 3 ===
There were 24 teams participating in round 3. The first legs were played on 3–4 December and the second legs were played on 10–11 December 2022.

| Team 1 | Agg. | Team 2 | 1st leg | 2nd leg |
|---|---|---|---|---|
| H65 Höörs HK (Sweden) | 48–63 | (Romania) SCM Râmnicu Vâlcea | 24–31 | 24–32 |
| Siófok KC (Hungary) | 61–52 | (Romania) CS Măgura Cisnădie | 33–24 | 28–28 |
| Nykøbing Falster Håndbold (Denmark) | 64–51 | (Denmark) Viborg HK | 34–21 | 30–30 |
| Motherson Mosonmagyaróvár (Hungary) | 52–51 | (Romania) SCM Gloria Buzău | 29–26 | 23–25 |
| MKS Zagłębie Lubin (Poland) | 48–50 | (Croatia) Podravka Vegeta | 24–24 | 24–26 |
| IK Sävehof (Sweden) | 52–65 | (Germany) Thüringer HC | 22–30 | 30–35 |
| Rocasa Gran Canaria (Spain) | 57–66 | (Norway) Sola HK | 29–32 | 28–34 |
| Borussia Dortmund (Germany) | 74–37 | (Serbia) ZRK Zeleznicar – Indjija | 43–22 | 31–15 |
| Fana (Norway) | 51–46 | (Germany) Buxtehuder SV | 28–21 | 23–25 |
| ESBF Besançon (France) | 59–53 | (Spain) Super Amara Bera Bera | 32–29 | 27–24 |
| VfL Oldenburg (Germany) | 51–69 | (France) Neptunes de Nantes | 27–34 | 24–35 |
| Praktiker-Vác (Hungary) | 68–55 | (Switzerland) LC Brühl Handball | 30–26 | 38–29 |

== Group stage ==
Location of teams of the 2022–23 Women's EHF European League group stage.
Red: Group A; Blue: Group B; Yellow: Group C; Green: Group D.

The draw for the group phase was held on Thursday, 15 December 2022. In each group, teams played against each other in a double round-robin format, with home and away matches.

Tiebreakers
In the group stage, teams were ranked according to points (2 points for a win, 1 point for a draw, 0 points for a loss). After completion of the group stage, if two or more teams have scored the same number of points, the ranking will be determined as follows:
1. Highest number of points in matches between the teams directly involved;
2. Superior goal difference in matches between the teams directly involved;
3. Highest number of goals scored in matches between the teams directly involved;
4. Superior goal difference in all matches of the group;
5. Highest number of plus goals in all matches of the group;

If the ranking of one of these teams is determined, the above criteria are consecutively followed until the ranking of all teams is determined. If no ranking can be determined, a decision shall be obtained by EHF through drawing of lots.

During the group stage, only criteria 4–5 apply to determine the provisional ranking of teams.

=== Group A ===
| Pos | Team | Pld | W | D | L | GF | GA | GD | Pts | Qualification | DOR | SIO | BES | MOL |
|---|---|---|---|---|---|---|---|---|---|---|---|---|---|---|
| 1 | (Germany) Borussia Dortmund | 6 | 5 | 0 | 1 | 176 | 154 | +22 | 10 | Quarterfinals | — | 26–23 | 31–21 | 33–32 |
| 2 | (Hungary) Siófok KC | 6 | 4 | 0 | 2 | 153 | 149 | +4 | 8 | Quarterfinals | 27–24 | — | 20–18 | 30–22 |
| 3 | (France) ESBF Besançon | 6 | 3 | 0 | 3 | 172 | 163 | +9 | 6 | | 27–30 | 30–21 | — | 35–32 |
| 4 | (Norway) Molde Elite | 6 | 0 | 0 | 6 | 168 | 203 | −35 | 0 | | 24–32 | 29–32 | 29–41 | — |

Source: EHF

=== Group B ===
| Pos | Team | Pld | W | D | L | GF | GA | GD | Pts | Qualification | IKA | NAN | MOS | FAN |
|---|---|---|---|---|---|---|---|---|---|---|---|---|---|---|
| 1 | (Denmark) Ikast Håndbold | 6 | 6 | 0 | 0 | 189 | 147 | +42 | 12 | Quarterfinals | — | 30–20 | 28–26 | 29–23 |
| 2 | (France) Neptunes de Nantes | 6 | 3 | 0 | 3 | 174 | 173 | +1 | 6 | Quarterfinals | 28–33 | — | 36–29 | 29–21 |
| 3 | (Hungary) Motherson Mosonmagyaróvár | 6 | 2 | 0 | 4 | 174 | 185 | −11 | 4 | | 26–34 | 30–33 | — | 35–29 |
| 4 | (Norway) Fana | 6 | 1 | 0 | 5 | 152 | 184 | −32 | 2 | | 24–35 | 30–28 | 25–28 | — |

Source: EHF

=== Group C ===
| Pos | Team | Pld | W | D | L | GF | GA | GD | Pts | Qualification | NYK | SOL | DEB | POD |
|---|---|---|---|---|---|---|---|---|---|---|---|---|---|---|
| 1 | (Denmark) Nykøbing Falster Håndbold | 6 | 4 | 0 | 2 | 172 | 151 | +21 | 8 (Note: Nykøbing 4 Pts, +11 GD; Sola 4 Pts, +1 GD; DVSC 4 Pts, −12 GD) | Quarterfinals | — | 26–28 | 34–22 | 28–23 |
| 2 | (Norway) Sola HK | 6 | 4 | 0 | 2 | 171 | 156 | +15 | 8 | Quarterfinals | 26–28 | — | 30–25 | 35–29 |
| 3 | (Hungary) DVSC Schaeffler | 6 | 4 | 0 | 2 | 158 | 163 | −5 | 8 | | 28–27 | 25–21 | — | 32–31 |
| 4 | (Croatia) Podravka Vegeta | 6 | 0 | 0 | 6 | 150 | 181 | −31 | 0 | | 24–29 | 23–31 | 20–26 | — |

Source: EHF

=== Group D ===
| Pos | Team | Pld | W | D | L | GF | GA | GD | Pts | Qualification | THC | VAL | P92 | VAC |
|---|---|---|---|---|---|---|---|---|---|---|---|---|---|---|
| 1 | (Germany) Thüringer HC | 6 | 4 | 1 | 1 | 188 | 162 | +26 | 9 | Quarterfinals | — | 38–31 | 28–24 | 31–21 |
| 2 | (Romania) SCM Râmnicu Vâlcea | 6 | 3 | 1 | 2 | 183 | 178 | +5 | 7 | Quarterfinals | 32–32 | — | 30–28 | 40–30 |
| 3 | (France) Paris 92 | 6 | 3 | 0 | 3 | 154 | 156 | −2 | 6 | | 26–25 | 24–22 | — | 26–24 |
| 4 | (Hungary) Praktiker-Vác | 6 | 1 | 0 | 5 | 156 | 185 | −29 | 2 | | 28–34 | 26–28 | 27–26 | — |

Source: EHF

== Quarterfinals ==
| Team 1 | Agg. | Team 2 | 1st leg | 2nd leg |
|---|---|---|---|---|
| Neptunes de Nantes (France) | 50–51 | (Germany) Borussia Dortmund | 28–19 | 22–32 |
| Siófok KC (Hungary) | 41–61 | (Denmark) Ikast Håndbold | 20–30 | 21–31 |
| SCM Râmnicu Vâlcea (Romania) | 61–67 | (Denmark) Nykøbing Falster Håndbold | 32–29 | 29–38 |
| Sola HK (Norway) | 59–62 | (Germany) Thüringer HC | 35–35 | 24–27 |

=== Matches ===
| 19 March 2023; 18:00 | Neptunes de Nantes (France) | 28–19 | (Germany) Borussia Dortmund | Complexe Sportif Mangin-Beaulieu, Nantes; Attendance: 2,159; Referees: Di Domenico, Fornasier (ITA) |
| 19 March 2023; 18:00 | Hagman 7 | (14–7) | Bleckmann 7 | Complexe Sportif Mangin-Beaulieu, Nantes; Attendance: 2,159; Referees: Di Domenico, Fornasier (ITA) |
| 19 March 2023; 18:00 | 3× (suspension) | Report | 6× (suspension) | Complexe Sportif Mangin-Beaulieu, Nantes; Attendance: 2,159; Referees: Di Domenico, Fornasier (ITA) |

| 26 March 2023; 16:00 | Borussia Dortmund (Germany) | 32–22 | (France) Neptunes de Nantes | Westpress Arena, Hamm; Attendance: 1,208; Referees: Kijauskaitė, Žalienė (LTU) |
| 26 March 2023; 16:00 | Grijseels 9 | (13–11) | Grandveau 5 | Westpress Arena, Hamm; Attendance: 1,208; Referees: Kijauskaitė, Žalienė (LTU) |
| 26 March 2023; 16:00 | 4× (suspension) | Report | 1× (yellow card) 2× (suspension) | Westpress Arena, Hamm; Attendance: 1,208; Referees: Kijauskaitė, Žalienė (LTU) |

| 18 March 2023; 20:00 | Siófok KC (Hungary) | 20–30 | (Denmark) Ikast Håndbold | Kiss Szilárd Sportcsarnok, Siófok; Attendance: 1,500; Referees: Lidacka, Lesiak (POL) |
| 18 March 2023; 20:00 | Papp 5 | (7–12) | Bakkerud 8 | Kiss Szilárd Sportcsarnok, Siófok; Attendance: 1,500; Referees: Lidacka, Lesiak (POL) |
| 18 March 2023; 20:00 | 2× (suspension) | Report | 1× (yellow card) 4× (suspension) | Kiss Szilárd Sportcsarnok, Siófok; Attendance: 1,500; Referees: Lidacka, Lesiak (POL) |

| 25 March 2023; 20:00 | Ikast Håndbold (Denmark) | 31–21 | (Hungary) Siófok KC | IBF Arena, Ikast; Attendance: 1,205; Referees: Rauchs, Linster (LUX) |
| 25 March 2023; 20:00 | Scaglione 6 | (17–8) | Milosavljević 9 | IBF Arena, Ikast; Attendance: 1,205; Referees: Rauchs, Linster (LUX) |
| 25 March 2023; 20:00 | 1× (yellow card) 2× (suspension) | Report | 1× (yellow card) 2× (suspension) | IBF Arena, Ikast; Attendance: 1,205; Referees: Rauchs, Linster (LUX) |

| 18 March 2023; 16:00 | SCM Râmnicu Vâlcea (Romania) | 32–29 | (Denmark) Nykøbing Falster Håndbold | Traian Sports Hall, Râmnicu Vâlcea; Attendance: 2,239; Referees: Fukala, Mohyla (CZE) |
| 18 March 2023; 16:00 | Glibko 7 | (16–14) | Halilcevic 6 | Traian Sports Hall, Râmnicu Vâlcea; Attendance: 2,239; Referees: Fukala, Mohyla (CZE) |
| 18 March 2023; 16:00 | 1× (yellow card) 4× (suspension) | Report | 1× (yellow card) 3× (suspension) | Traian Sports Hall, Râmnicu Vâlcea; Attendance: 2,239; Referees: Fukala, Mohyla (CZE) |

| 26 March 2023; 18:00 | Nykøbing Falster Håndbold (Denmark) | 38–29 | (Romania) SCM Râmnicu Vâlcea | Næstved Arena, Næstved; Attendance: 2,425; Referees: Kinnari, Skogberg (FIN) |
| 26 March 2023; 18:00 | Halilcevic 10 | (17–14) | Glibko, Kovačević 9 | Næstved Arena, Næstved; Attendance: 2,425; Referees: Kinnari, Skogberg (FIN) |
| 26 March 2023; 18:00 | 1× (yellow card) 3× (suspension) | Report | 6× (suspension) | Næstved Arena, Næstved; Attendance: 2,425; Referees: Kinnari, Skogberg (FIN) |

| 19 March 2023; 16:00 | Sola HK (Norway) | 35–35 | (Germany) Thüringer HC | Stavanger Idrettshall, Stavanger; Attendance: 939; Referees: Kull, Tint (EST) |
| 19 March 2023; 16:00 | Magnussen, Tveiten 6 | (19–17) | Lott 10 | Stavanger Idrettshall, Stavanger; Attendance: 939; Referees: Kull, Tint (EST) |
| 19 March 2023; 16:00 | 5× (suspension) 1× (red card) | Report | 1× (yellow card) 8× (suspension) | Stavanger Idrettshall, Stavanger; Attendance: 939; Referees: Kull, Tint (EST) |

| 26 March 2023; 14:00 | Thüringer HC (Germany) | 27–24 | (Norway) Sola HK | Salza-Halle, Bad Langensalza; Attendance: 1,800; Referees: Lindenbaum, Laron (ISR) |
| 26 March 2023; 14:00 | Lott, Stockschläder 6 | (16–12) | Novak 8 | Salza-Halle, Bad Langensalza; Attendance: 1,800; Referees: Lindenbaum, Laron (ISR) |
| 26 March 2023; 14:00 | 2× (yellow card) 2× (suspension) | Report | 4× (suspension) | Salza-Halle, Bad Langensalza; Attendance: 1,800; Referees: Lindenbaum, Laron (ISR) |

== Final four ==
The final four was held at the Raiffeisen Sportpark in Graz, Austria on 13 and 14 May 2023. The draw was made on 28 March 2023.

=== Bracket ===
Semifinals
13 May
(Germany) Borussia Dortmund | 33
(Denmark) Nykøbing Falster Håndbold (Pen.) | 35
13 May
(Denmark) Ikast Håndbold | 31
(Germany) Thüringer HC | 26

Final
14 May
(Denmark) Nykøbing Falster Håndbold | 24
(Denmark) Ikast Håndbold | 31
Third place
14 May
(Germany) Borussia Dortmund | 28
(Germany) Thüringer HC | 23

==== Semifinals ====
| 13 May 2023; 15:30 | Ikast Håndbold (Denmark) | 31–26 | (Germany) Thüringer HC | Raiffeisen Sportpark, Graz; Attendance: 1,300; Referees: Lovin, Stancu (ROU) |
| 13 May 2023; 15:30 | Bakkerud 8 | (17–10) | Hendrikse 10 | Raiffeisen Sportpark, Graz; Attendance: 1,300; Referees: Lovin, Stancu (ROU) |
| 13 May 2023; 15:30 | 1× (yellow card) 2× (suspension) 1× (red card) | Report | 1× (yellow card) 6× (suspension) | Raiffeisen Sportpark, Graz; Attendance: 1,300; Referees: Lovin, Stancu (ROU) |

13 May 2023
18:00
Borussia Dortmund (Germany)
33–35 (ET)
(Denmark) Nykøbing Falster Håndbold
Raiffeisen Sportpark, Graz
Attendance: 1,300
Referees: Antić, Jakovljević (SRB)
three players 6
(17–13)
Svele 10
3× (suspension)
Report
2× (yellow card) 5× (suspension)

FT: 29–29 ET: 32–32 Pen: 33–35

==== Third place game ====
| 14 May 2023; 15:30 | Borussia Dortmund (Germany) | 28–23 | (Germany) Thüringer HC | Raiffeisen Sportpark, Graz; Attendance: 1,300; Referees: Lidacka, Lesiak (POL) |
| 14 May 2023; 15:30 | Hausherr 7 | (12–10) | Lott 7 | Raiffeisen Sportpark, Graz; Attendance: 1,300; Referees: Lidacka, Lesiak (POL) |
| 14 May 2023; 15:30 | 7× (suspension) | Report | 1× (yellow card) 3× (suspension) | Raiffeisen Sportpark, Graz; Attendance: 1,300; Referees: Lidacka, Lesiak (POL) |

==== Final ====
| 14 May 2023; 18:00 | Nykøbing Falster Håndbold (Denmark) | 24–31 | (Denmark) Ikast Håndbold | Raiffeisen Sportpark, Graz; Attendance: 1,500; Referees: Vujačić, Kažanegra (MNE) |
| 14 May 2023; 18:00 | Sajka 6 | (15–14) | Friis 11 | Raiffeisen Sportpark, Graz; Attendance: 1,500; Referees: Vujačić, Kažanegra (MNE) |
| 14 May 2023; 18:00 | 1× (yellow card) 5× (suspension) | Report | 1× (yellow card) 4× (suspension) | Raiffeisen Sportpark, Graz; Attendance: 1,500; Referees: Vujačić, Kažanegra (MNE) |

== Top goalscorers ==
| Rank | Player | Club | Goals |
|---|---|---|---|
| 1 | (Germany) Annika Lott | (Germany) Thüringer HC | 86 |
| 2 | (Denmark) Elma Halilcevic | (Denmark) Nykøbing Falster Håndbold | 82 |
| 3 | (Ukraine) Iryna Glibko | (Romania) SCM Râmnicu Vâlcea | 72 |
| 4 | (Netherlands) Nathalie Hendrikse | (Germany) Thüringer HC | 64 |
| 5 | (Hungary) Asma Elghaoui | (Romania) SCM Râmnicu Vâlcea | 61 |
| 6 | (Norway) Mia Svele | (Denmark) Nykøbing Falster Håndbold | 60 |
| 7 | (Slovenia) Tamara Mavsar | (Hungary) Siófok KC | 59 |
| 8 | (Norway) Sara Berg | (Norway) Fana | 58 |
| 9 | (Sweden) Nathalie Hagman | (France) Neptunes de Nantes | 57 |
| 9 | (Hungary) Csenge Kuczora | (Hungary) Praktiker-Vác | 57 |

== See also ==
- 2022–23 Women's EHF Champions League
