= Kristina Novak =

Norwegian handball player (born 2000)

Personal information
- Full name: Kristina Sirum Novak
- Nationality: Norwegian
- Born: 29 August 2000 (age 26) Stavanger, Norway
- Height: 1.73 m (5 ft 8 in)

Sport
- Sport: Handball
- Position: Right back
- Current club: CSM București
- Number: 22

Youth career
- Years: Team
- –: Austrått IL
- –: Ålgård HK

Senior clubs
- Years: Team
- 2017–2018: Ålgård HK
- 2018–2024: Sola HK
- 2024–2025: Brest Bretagne Handball
- 2025–: CSM București
National team
| Years | Team | Apps | (Gls) |
| 2022– | Norway | 34 | (47) |
Medal record
World Championship
| Silver medal – second place | 2023 Denmark/Norway/Sweden |
European Championship
| Gold medal – first place | 2022 Slovenia/North Macedonia/Montenegro |
Youth European Championship
| Silver medal – second place | 2017 Slovakia |
- Updated on 22 July 2024

Kristina Sirum Novak (born 29 August 2000) is a Norwegian handball player for CSM București and the Norwegian national team.

She also represented Norway at the 2018 Women's Youth World Handball Championship, placing 11th.

== International career ==
She made her debut on the Norwegian national team on 21 April 2022, against North Macedonia. She would play at her first major international tournament later the same year at the 2022 European Championship in Slovenia, North Macedonia and Montenegro, where Norway won gold medals.

The year after she won silver medals at the 2023 World Championship, losing to France in the final.

== Achievements ==
- European Championship:
  - Winner: 2022
- REMA 1000-ligaen
  - Bronze: 2020/21, 2021/22, 2022/23, 2023/24
- Norwegian Cup
  - Silver: 2020, 2022/2023

== Personal life ==
She is the daughter of a Norwegian mother and Croatian father. She hails from Håbafjell in Sandnes and is the younger sister of footballer Kristian Novak.
