= Sofie Grønlund =

Norwegian handball player (born 1999)

Personal information
- Full name: Sofie Ege Grønlund
- Nationality: Norwegian
- Born: 3 April 1999 (age 27) Bergen, Norway

Sport
- Sport: Handball
- Position: Goalkeeper

Senior clubs
- Years: Team
- –2017: Fyllingen
- 2017–2021: Fana
- 2021–2023: Storhamar HE
National team
Years	Team	Apps	(Gls)
2015–2019	Norway U19	59	(0)
Medal record
Junior World Championship
Silver medal – second place	2018 Hungary

Sofie Ege Grønlund (born 3 April 1999) is a Norwegian retired handball player who last played for Storhamar HE.

She also represented Norway in the 2017 Women's Junior European Handball Championship, placing 7th, and in the 2016 Women's Youth World Handball Championship, placing 4th.

== Achievements ==
- Junior World Championship:
  - Silver Medalist: 2018
- Norwegian League
  - Silver: 2021/2022, 2022/2023
