= Dina Frisendal =

Norwegian handball player (born 2000)

Personal information
- Nationality: Norwegian
- Born: 31 July 2004 (age 22) Trondheim, Norway
- Height: 1.79 m (5 ft 10 in)

Sport
- Sport: Handball
- Position: Goalkeeper
- Current club: Larvik HK
- Number: 12

Youth career
- Years: Team
- 2010–2017: Nationalkameratene
- 2017–2020: Sverresborg IF

Senior clubs
- Years: Team
- 2020–2022: Sverresborg IF
- 2022–2023: Charlottenlund SK
- 2023–2025: Fana
- 2024–01/2025: → Vipers Kristiansand (loan)
- 2025–: Larvik HK
National team
Years	Team	Apps	(Gls)
2025–	Norway	1	(0)

Dina Frisendal (born 31 July 2004) is a Norwegian professional handball player for Larvik HK.

She represented Norway at the 2021 European Women's U-17 Handball Championship, placing 6th, at the 2022 IHF Women's U18 Handball World Championship, placing 9th, and at the 2024 Women's Junior World Handball Championship, placing 10th.

== Achievements ==
- Norwegian Cup U20:
  - Finalist: 2023/24
- Norwegian Cup:
  - Finalist: 2025
