= Anna Bjørke Kallestad =

Norwegian handball player (born 1996)

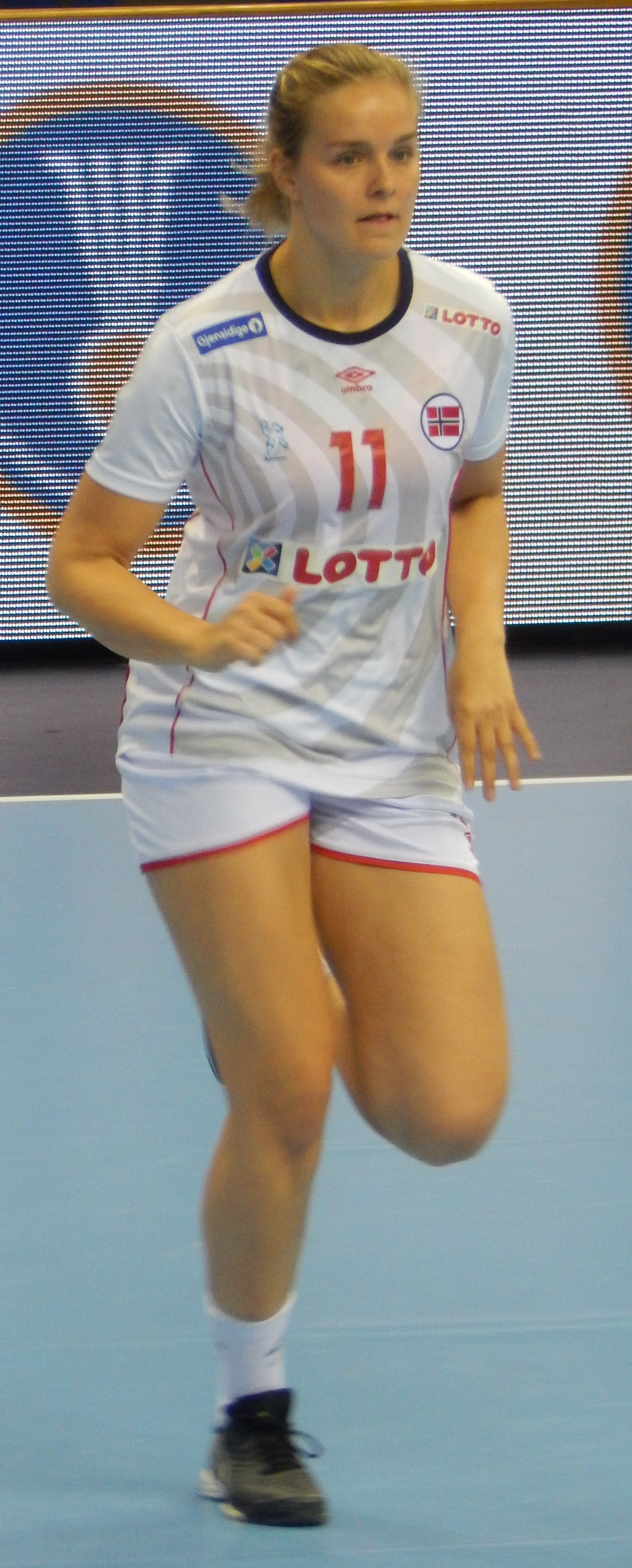

Personal information
- Nationality: Norwegian
- Born: 23 May 1996 (age 30) Os, Norway
- Height: 1.79 m (5 ft 10 in)

Sport
- Sport: Handball
- Position: Right back
- Current club: Fana
- Number: 4

Senior clubs
- Years: Team
- 2015–2018: Sola HK
- 2018–2021: Byåsen HE
- 2021–2022: Fana

Anna Bjørke Kallestad (born 23 May 1996) is a Norwegian handball player.

She represented Norway in the 2016 Women's Junior World Handball Championship, placing 5th, at the 2015 Women's Under-19 European Handball Championship, placing 6th and at the 2014 Women's Youth World Handball Championship, placing 13th.

== Achievements ==
- Norwegian League
  - Bronze Medalist: 2019/2020

== Individual awards ==
- All-Star Right Back of Eliteserien: 2019/2020
