= Olivia Lykke Nygaard =

Norwegian handball player (born 2001)

Personal information
- Nationality: Danish; Norwegian
- Born: 14 September 2001 (age 25) Oppegård, Norway
- Height: 1.80 m (5 ft 11 in)

Sport
- Sport: Handball
- Position: Goalkeeper
- Current club: Larvik HK

Youth career
- Years: Team
- –: Oppgård IL

Senior clubs
- Years: Team
- 2018–2021: Aker Topphåndball
- 2021–2023: Fana
- 2023–2024: Storhamar HE
- 2024–: Ikast Håndbold
- 01/2026–06/2026: → Larvik HK (loan)
National team
Years	Team	Apps	(Gls)
2023–	Norway	8	(2)
Medal record
World Championship
Silver medal – second place	2023 Denmark/Norway/Sweden
Junior European Championship
Bronze medal – third place	2019 Hungary

Olivia Lykke Nygaard (born 14 September 2001) is a Norwegian handball player for Larvik HK and the Norwegian national team.

She was part of the Norwegian squad for the 2019 Women's U-19 European Handball Championship, where she received a bronze medal.

Nygaard was a Danish citizen until 2018, but after becoming a Norwegian citizen she quickly became a part of Norway's junior team because of her talent as a goalkeeper.

On 5 March 2023, Nygaard made her debut on the Norwegian national team, and on 7 November 2023, she was selected to represent Norway at the 2023 World Women's Handball Championship.

== Achievements ==
- World Championship:
  - Silver Medalist: 2023
- Junior European Championship:
  - Bronze Medalist: 2019
- EHF European League:
  - Winner: 2023/2024
- REMA 1000-ligaen
  - Silver: 2023/2024
- Norwegian Cup:
  - Finalist: 2023/2024

== Individual awards ==
- All-Star Goalkeeper of REMA 1000-ligaen: 2022/2023
