= Annika Lott =

German handball player (born 1999)

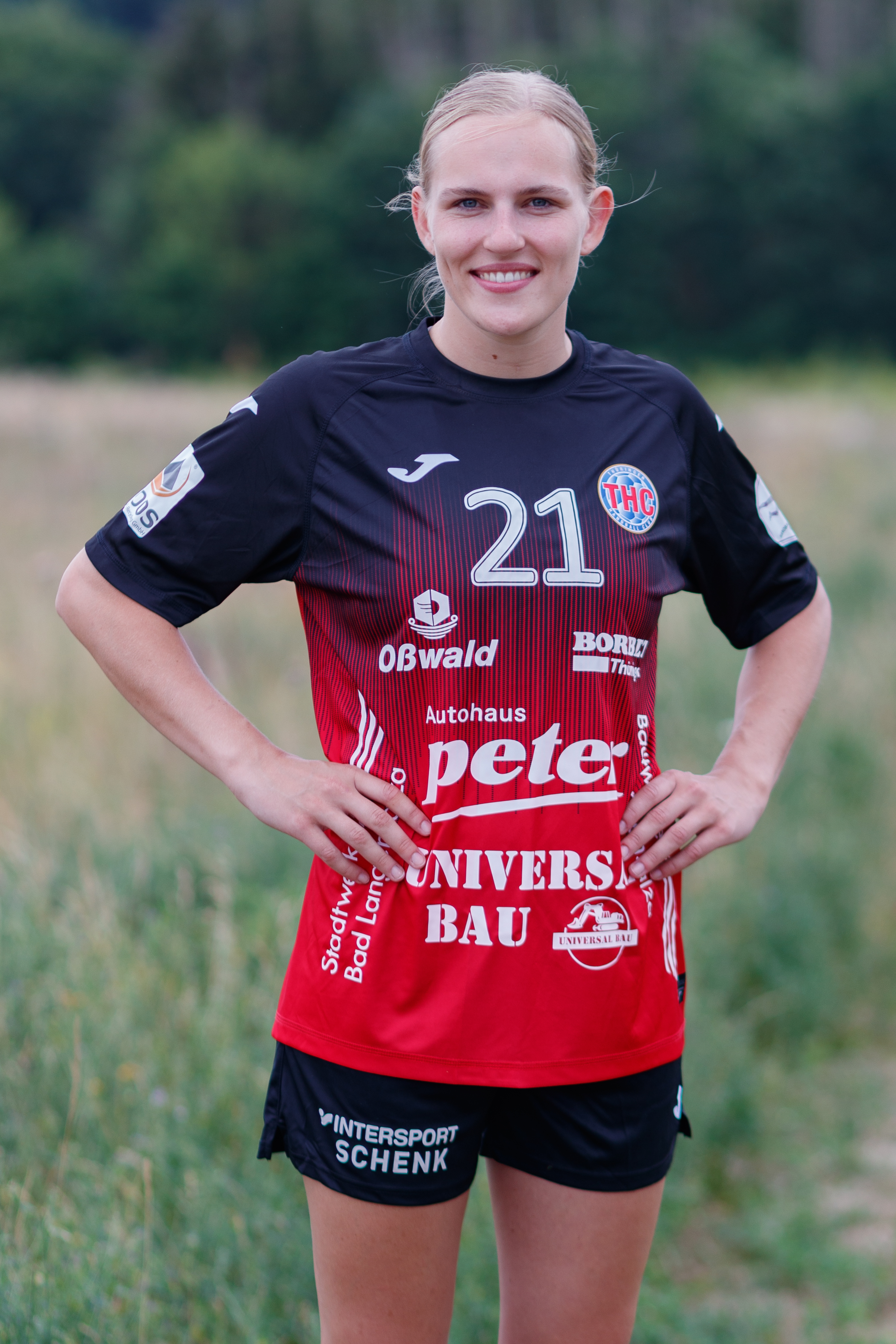

Personal information
- Nationality: German
- Born: 7 December 1999 (age 26) Henstedt-Ulzburg, Germany
- Height: 1.80 m (5 ft 11 in)

Sport
- Sport: Handball
- Position: Left back
- Current club: Thüringer HC
- Number: 21

Youth career
- Years: Team
- –2013: SV Henstedt-Ulzburg
- 2013–2014: JSG Alstertal/Norderstedt
- 2014–2016: SV Henstedt-Ulzburg
- 2016–2018: Bayer 04 Leverkusen

Senior clubs
- Years: Team
- 2016–2018: Bayer 04 Leverkusen II
- 2018–2022: Buxtehuder SV
- 2022–2024: Thüringer HC
- 2024–2027: Brest Bretagne Handball
National team
Years	Team	Apps	(Gls)
2020–	Germany	46	(88)
Medal record
World Championship
Silver medal – second place	2025 Netherlands/Germany
- Updated on 4 November 2025

Annika Lott (born 7 December 1999) is a German professional female handball player for Brest Bretagne Handball and the German national team.

She represented Germany at the 2020, 2022 and 2024 European Women's Handball Championship, as well as the 2025 World Women's Handball Championship. Here Germany reached the final, where they lost to Norway. This was the first time since 1994 that Germany made the final of a major international tournament and the first time they won a medal since 2007.
