= Oda Mastad =

Norwegian handball player (born 1997)

Personal information
- Full name: Oda Cathrine Lunne Mastad
- Nationality: Norwegian
- Born: 1 January 1997 (age 29) Trondheim, Norway
- Height: 1.75 m (5 ft 9 in)

Sport
- Sport: Handball
- Position: Pivot
- Current club: Storhamar HE
- Number: 37

Senior clubs
- Years: Team
- 2016–2017: Charlottenlund
- 2017–2024: Fana
- 2024–: Storhamar HE
National team
Years	Team	Apps	(Gls)
2023–	Norway	4	(2)

Oda Cathrine Lunne Mastad (born 1 January 1997) is a Norwegian handball player, who plays for Storhamar Håndball Elite and the Norwegian national team.

On 2 March 2023, Mastad made her debut on the national team.

== Achievements ==
- Norwegian League
  - Gold: 2024/2025
  - Silver: 2025/2026
- Norwegian Cup:
  - Winner: 2024, 2025

== Personal life ==
Her sister Fride Mastad plays for Byåsen HE.
