= Celine Solstad =

Norwegian handball player (born 1997)

Personal information
- Full name: Celine Marie Solstad
- Nationality: Norwegian
- Born: 1 May 1997 (age 29) Bergen, Norway
- Height: 1.69 m (5 ft 7 in)

Sport
- Sport: Handball
- Position: Right back
- Current club: ESBF Besançon
- Number: 17

Senior clubs
- Years: Team
- 2013–2024: Fana
- 2024–: ESBF Besançon
National team
| Years | Team | Apps | (Gls) |
| 2023– | Norway | 1 | (3) |

Celine Marie Solstad (born 1 May 1997) is a Norwegian handball player, who plays for ESBF Besançon.

On 22 July 2023, Solstad made her debut on the national team.
