= Christine Karlsen Alver =

Norwegian handball player (born 2000)

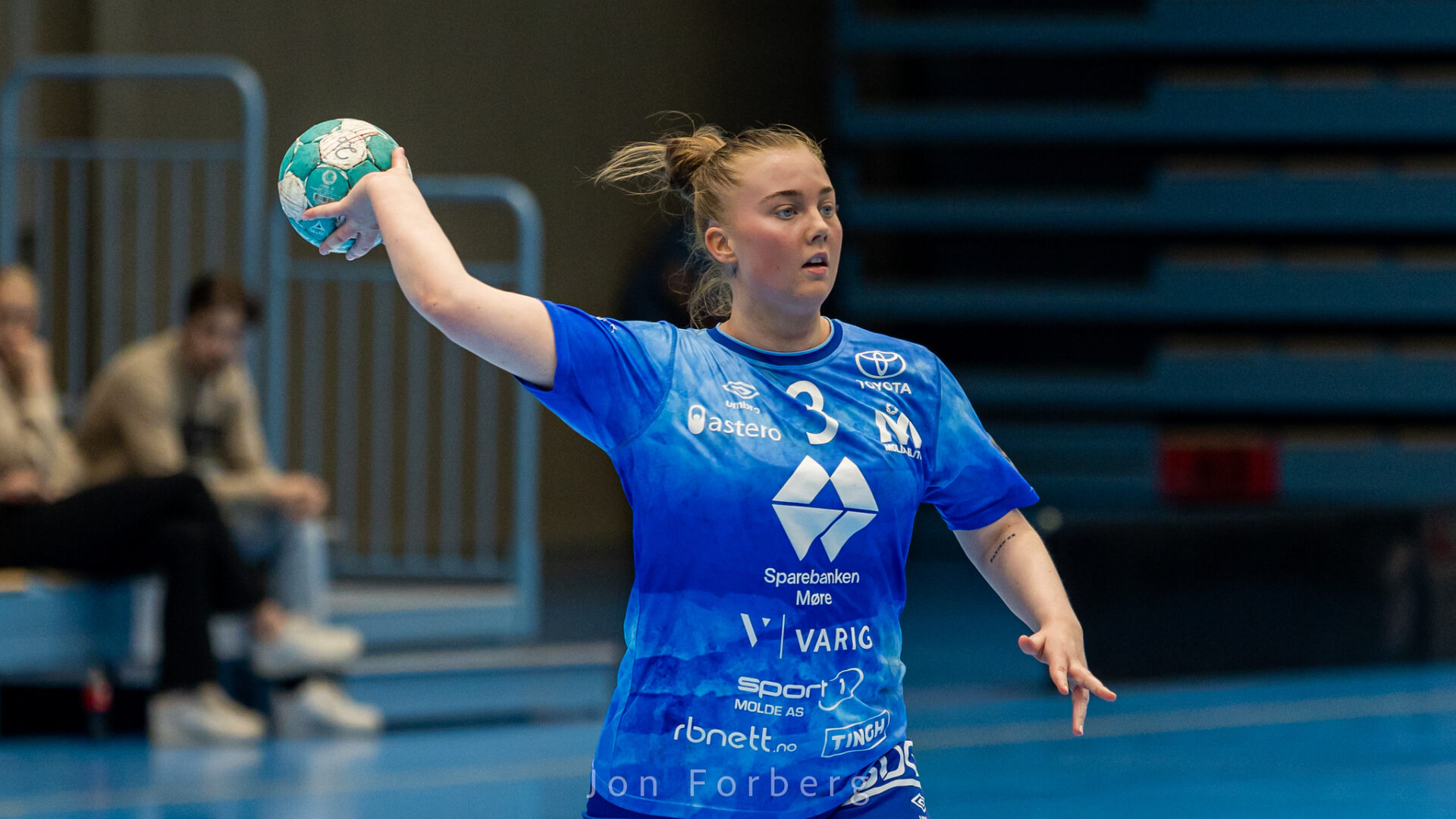

Personal information
- Full name: Christine Karlsen Alver
- Nationality: Norwegian
- Born: 16 July 2000 (age 26) Bergen, Norway
- Height: 1.67 m (5 ft 6 in)

Sport
- Sport: Handball
- Position: Centre back
- Current club: Fana Håndball
- Number: 33

Senior clubs
- Years: Team
- 2016–2022: Fana
- 2022–2024: Molde Elite
- 2024–01/2025: SCM Gloria Buzău
- 01/2025–: Fana
Medal record
Junior European Championship
Bronze medal – third place	2019 Hungary
Youth European Championship
Silver medal – second place	2017 Slovakia

Christine Karlsen Alver (born 16 July 2000) is a Norwegian handball player who plays for Fana Håndball.

She also represented Norway in the 2017 European Women's U-17 Handball Championship and in the 2019 Women's U-19 European Handball Championship.

== Achievements ==
- Junior European Championship:
  - Bronze Medalist: 2019
- Youth European Championship:
  - Silver Medalist: 2017

== Individual awards ==
- Best rookie of Eliteserien: 2018/2019
- All-Star Centre Back of REMA 1000-ligaen: 2021/2022
- Topscorer of REMA 1000-ligaen 2021/2022: (206 goals)
