= Camilla Herrem =

Norwegian handball player (born 1986)

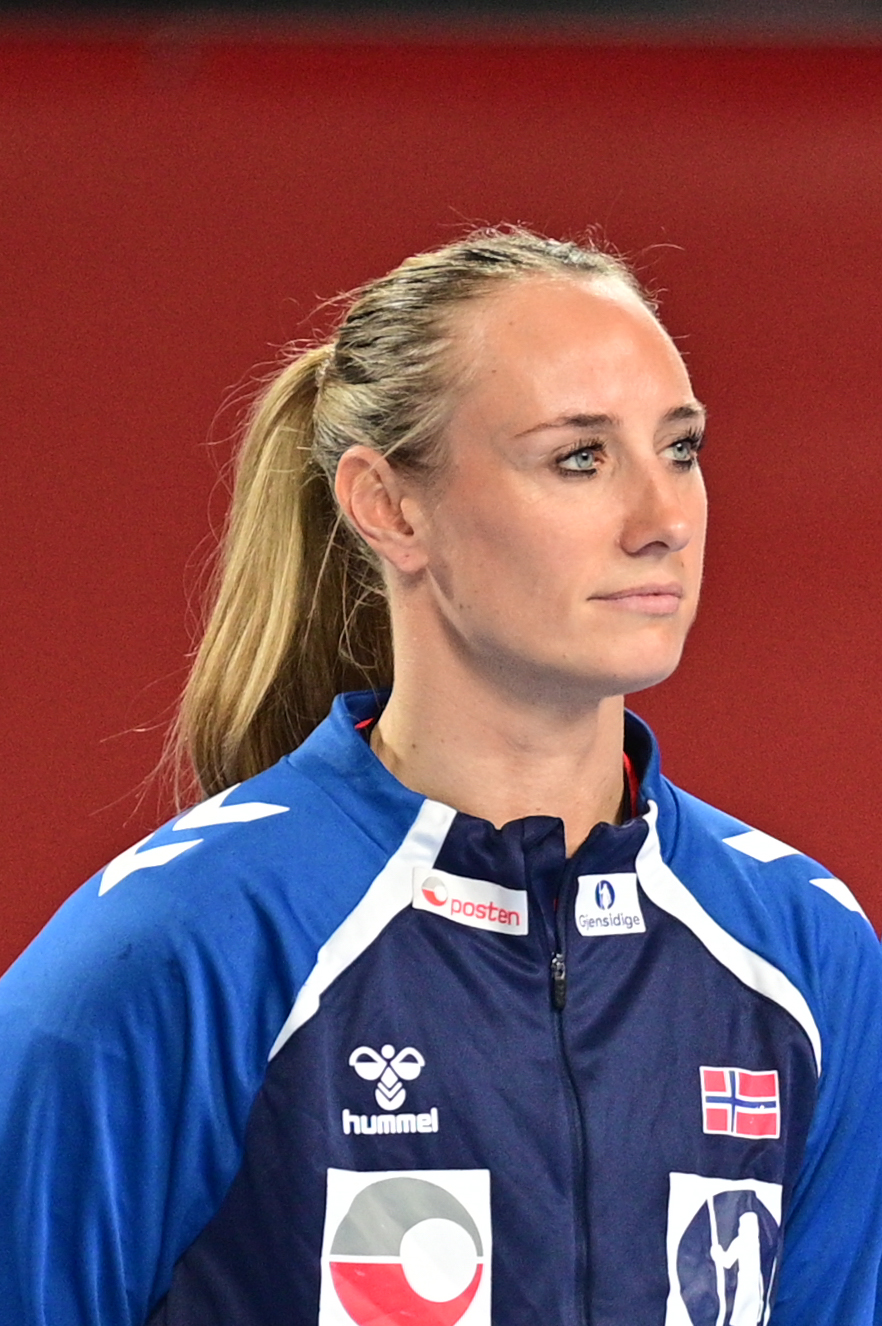
- Herrem in 2024

Personal information
- Nationality: Norwegian
- Born: 8 October 1986 (age 40) Sola, Norway
- Height: 1.67 m (5 ft 6 in)

Sport
- Sport: Handball
- Position: Left wing
- Current club: Sola HK
- Number: 77

Youth career
- Years: Team
- 1992–2002: Sola HK

Senior clubs
- Years: Team
- 2002–2006: Sola HK
- 2006–2014: Byåsen HE
- 2014–2015: HCM Baia Mare
- 2015–2016: TTH Holstebro
- 2016–2017: HC Vardar
- 2017–: Sola HK
National team
Years	Team	Apps	(Gls)
2006–2024	Norway	332	(951)
Medal record
Olympic Games
Gold medal – first place	2012 London	Team
Gold medal – first place	2024 Paris	Team
Bronze medal – third place	2016 Rio de Janeiro	Team
Bronze medal – third place	2020 Tokyo	Team
World Championship
Gold medal – first place	2011 Brazil
Gold medal – first place	2015 Denmark
Gold medal – first place	2021 Spain
Silver medal – second place	2017 Germany
Silver medal – second place	2023 Denmark/Norway/Sweden
Bronze medal – third place	2009 China
European Championship
Gold medal – first place	2008 Macedonia
Gold medal – first place	2010 Denmark/Norway
Gold medal – first place	2014 Croatia/Hungary
Gold medal – first place	2016 Sweden
Gold medal – first place	2020 Denmark
Gold medal – first place	2024 Austria/Hungary/Switzerland
Silver medal – second place	2012 Serbia

Camilla Herrem (born 8 October 1986) is a Norwegian handball player for Sola HK and formerly the Norwegian national team.

Considered by Norwegian media to be one of the best wing players of her generation, Herrem known for her speed and her affinity for spin and trick shots.

Her international achievements include two Olympic gold medals, three World Championship gold medals, and five gold medals at the European Championship. She became the most successful player in World Championships history with three gold, one silver and one bronze medal by winning the 2021 World Championship.

== Career ==
Herrem started to play handball at Sola HK as a playmaker, but retrained as a left wing at 16. She made her debut in the Norwegian League at the age of 16. She first played at international level in the Cup Winners' Cup in 2005.

She moved to the Norwegian Championship silver medalist Byåsen in 2006, wherein she was able to participate each year in the Champions League qualifications. She joined the Romanian champion HCM Baia Mare in the 2014–2015 season, where she reached the Champions League quarterfinals. She moved to the Danish club Team Tvis Holstebro for 1 year, and won the Cup Winners' Cup in 2016. She played in HC Vardar in the 2016–2017 season. The Macedonian team reached the Champions League final, and Camilla was chosen as the best left wing of the Champions League season. At the end of the season, she transferred back to Norway, to her first professional club, Sola HK.

She made her debut for the Norwegian national team against Sweden on 5 April 2006. Camilla has been participating in world tournaments since the 2008 European Championship. She also played in the national team at the 2012 Olympic Games, where they won the gold medal. She was also selected for the All-Star team(s) of the 2009 World Championship, the 2016 European Championship, the 2019 World Championship, and the 2020 European Championship.

Camilla Herrem was selected for the World Handball Team of 2011-2020 Decade's best left winger on handball-planet.com vote.

On April 4 2024 in the match against Hungary in EHF Euro Cup 2024, Herrem became historic to be the field player with most caps for Norway. She surpassed legend and retired handballer Karoline Dyhre Breivang, who ended with 305 caps for the Norwegian national team. However, the player with the most caps in total is still goalkeeper Katrine Lunde with 371 caps and counting.

On December 15 2024, at the end of the winning final match against Denmark at the 2024 European Championship she announced her retirement from the Norwegian national team with 332 matches and 951 goals in the national team colors.

Club career achievements
Season	Level	Team	League	Cup	International Cup	
2006/2007	1.	Byåsen	2.	2.	Cup Winners' Cup	final
2007/2008	1.	Byåsen	2.	winner	EHF Cup	1/4 final
2008/2009	1.	Byåsen	3.	2.	EHF Cup	1/4 final
2009/2010	1.	Byåsen	2.	2.	Cup Winners' Cup	1/4 final
2010/2011	1.	Byåsen	3.	1/4 final	EHF Cup	1/8 final
2011/2012	1.	Byåsen	2.	semi-final	Cup Winners' Cup	1/4 final
2012/2013	1.	Byåsen	2.	semi-final	Cup Winners' Cup	1/8 final
2013/2014	1.	Byåsen	2.	semi-final	Cup Winners' Cup	semi-final
2014/2015	1.	Baia Mare	2.	winner	Champions League	1/4 final
2015/2016	1.	Holstebro	3.	semi-final	Cup Winners' Cup	winner
2016/2017	1.	Vardar	winner	winner	Champions League	final
2017/2018	1.	Sola	10.	1/4 final	-	-
2018/2019	2.	Sola	winner	semi-final	-	-
2019/2020	1.	Sola	10.	1/4 final	-	-
2020/2021	1.	Sola	3.	2.	-	-
2021/2022	1.	Sola	3.	1/4 final	Europa League	1/4 final
2022/2023	1.	Sola	3.	2.	Europa League	1/4 final
2023/2024	1.	Sola	3.	semi-final	Europa League	1/4 final

== Achievements ==
- Olympic Games:
  - Winner: 2012, 2024
  - Bronze Medalist: 2016, 2020
- World Championship:
  - Winner: 2011, 2015, 2021
  - Silver Medalist: 2017, 2023
  - Bronze Medalist: 2009
- European Championship:
  - Winner: 2008, 2010, 2014, 2016, 2020, 2024
  - Silver Medalist: 2012
- EHF Champions League:
  - Finalist: 2016/2017
- EHF Cup Winners' Cup:
  - Winner: 2015/2016
  - Finalist: 2006/2007
  - Semifinalist: 2013/2014
- Norwegian League
  - Winner: 2025/26
  - Silver Medalist: 2006/2007, 2007/2008, 2009/2010, 2011/2012, 2012/2013, 2013/2014, 2024/2025
  - Bronze Medalist: 2008/2009, 2010/2011, 2020/2021, 2021/2022, 2022/2023, 2023/2024
- Norwegian Cup:
  - Winner: 2007
  - Finalist: 2006, 2008, 2009, 2020
- Norwegian Championship First Division (Level 2):
  - Winner: 2018/2019
- Romanian Cup:
  - Winner: 2014/2015
- Romanian Super Cup:
  - Winner: 2014
- Baia Mare Champions Trophy
  - Winner: 2014
- Macedonian Championship:
  - Winner: 2016/2017
- Macedonian Cup:
  - Winner: 2016/2017

== Individual awards ==
- Top Scorer of the 2021–22 Women's EHF European League (74 goals)
- World Handball Team of 2011–2020 Decade's best left winger
- All-Star Left Wing of the World Championship: 2009, 2019
- All-Star Left Wing of the European Championship: 2016, 2020
- All-Star Left Wing of the EHF Champions League: 2016/2017
- Handball-Planet.com All-Star Left Wing of the Year: 2017, 2019, 2020, 2021
- All-Star Left Wing of REMA 1000-ligaen: 2019/2020, 2020/2021 2021/2022, 2023/2024, 2024/2025, 2025/2026
- Team of the Tournament Left Wing of the Baia Mare Champions Trophy: 2014

== Personal life ==
Since July 2013, she is married to former Norwegian handballer, Steffen Stegavik. On 22 December 2017, Herrem announced that she is pregnant, and that the couple are expecting their first child in July 2018. On 7 July 2018, Herrem gave birth to her first son, and on 5 March 2023, Herrem gave birth to her second son. On 29 March 2023, only 24 days after giving birth Herrem made a comeback for Sola HK against Storhamar HE in REMA 1000-ligaen's 22nd and last match.

Camilla uten filter titled autobiographic book published in 2020.

In 2025 she was diagnosed with breast cancer and started chemotherapy in June 2025. Despite that she continued playing handball. In March 2026, she announced that she was free of cancer.
