= Julie Bøe Jacobsen =

Norwegian handballer (born 1998)

Personal information
- Nationality: Norwegian
- Born: 23 June 1998 (age 28) Lørenskog, Norway
- Height: 1.66 m (5 ft 5 in)

Sport
- Sport: Handball
- Position: Centre back
- Current club: Team Esbjerg
- Number: 33

Senior clubs
- Years: Team
- –2018: Rælingen HK
- 2018–2022: Byåsen HE
- 2022–2024: Team Esbjerg
- 2024–2026: Molde Elite
- 2026–: Nordvestjysk Elite
Medal record
Junior World Championship
Silver medal – second place	2018 Hungary

Julie Bøe Jacobsen (born 23 June 1998) is a Norwegian female handballer who plays for Team Esbjerg.

== Achievements ==
- Junior World Championship:
  - Silver Medalist: 2018
- EHF Champions League:
  - Bronze medalist: 2023/2024
- Norwegian League:
  - Bronze Medalist: 2019/2020, 2025/2026
- Danish League:
  - Gold Medalist: 2023
- Danish Cup:
  - Gold Medalist: 2022

== Individual awards ==
- All-Star Centre Back of Eliteserien: 2019/2020
