= Linn Gossé =

Norwegian handball player (born 1986)

Personal information
- Nationality: Norwegian
- Born: 25 June 1986 (age 40) Bærum, Norway
- Height: 1.70 m (5 ft 7 in)

Sport
- Sport: Handball
- Position: Left wing

Youth career
- Years: Team
- –: Vollen

Senior clubs
- Years: Team
- –2009: Stabæk IF
- 2009–2014: Tertnes HE
- 2014–2016: Randers HK
- 2016–2019: TIF Viking
- 2019–2025: Tertnes HE
National team
Years	Team	Apps	(Gls)
2005–2014	Norway	32	(70)
Medal record
Women's handball
Representing Norway
European Championship
Silver medal – second place	2012 Serbia

Linn Gossé (born 25 June 1986) is a retired Norwegian handball player, who last played for Tertnes HE.

She made her debut on the Norwegian national team back in 2005 and played two matches that year.

She was back on the national team in 2012, but later lost her position on the team to Sanna Solberg-Isaksen.

== Achievements ==
- European Championship:
  - Silver Medalist: 2012
- Norwegian Cup:
  - Finalist: 2024

== Individual awards ==
- All-Star Left Wing of Postenligaen 2013/2014
- All-Star Left Wing of Postenligaen 2012/2013
- Topscorer of Postenligaen 2011/2012 (127 goals)
- All-Star Left Wing of Postenligaen 2011/2012
- Most Valuable Player of Postenligaen 2011/2012
- All-Star Left Wing of Postenligaen 2010/2011
