= Mona Obaidli =

Norwegian handball player (born 1997)

Personal information
- Nationality: Norwegian
- Born: 17 February 1997 (age 29) Molde, Norway
- Height: 1.75 m (5 ft 9 in)

Sport
- Sport: Handball
- Position: Left/centre back
- Current club: Nykøbing Falster Håndboldklub
- Number: 26

Youth career
- Years: Team
- –2013: Molde HK

Senior clubs
- Years: Team
- 2013–2023: Molde Elite
- 2023–: Nykøbing Falster Håndboldklub
National team
Years	Team	Apps	(Gls)
2025–	Norway	3	(0)

Mona Obaidli (born 17 February 1997) is a Norwegian handball player who plays for Nykøbing Falster Håndboldklub.

== Career ==
Obaidli represented Norway at the 2016 Women's Junior World Handball Championship, placing 5th.

She is also a part of Norway's national recruit team in handball.

Since the beginning of her career she played in Molde Elite, before joining Danish side Nykøbing Falster Håndboldklub at the start of the 2023–2024 season.

== Personal life ==
Fellow handballers Anniken Obaidli and Sherin Obaidli are her sisters. Obaidli's father hails from Bahrain.
