= Emilie Hovden =

Norwegian handball player (born 1996)

Emilie Margrethe Hovden
Personal information
- Nationality: Norwegian
- Born: 5 April 1996 (age 30) Bergen, Norway
- Height: 1.60 m (5 ft 3 in)

Sport
- Sport: Handball
- Position: Right wing
- Current club: Győri ETO KC
- Number: 26

Youth career
- Years: Team
- 2005–2012: Fana

Senior clubs
- Years: Team
- 2012–2015: Fana
- 2015–2016: Molde Elite
- 2016–2019: Fana
- 2019–2022: Storhamar HE
- 2022–2023: Viborg HK
- 2023–: Győri ETO KC
National team
Years	Team	Apps	(Gls)
2021–	Norway	77	(204)
Medal record
World Championship
Gold medal – first place	2021 Spain
Gold medal – first place	2025 Germany/Netherlands
Silver medal – second place	2023 Denmark/Norway/Sweden
European Championship
Gold medal – first place	2022 Slovenia/North Macedonia/Montenegro
Gold medal – first place	2024 Austria/Hungary/Switzerland

Emilie Hovden (born 5 April 1996) is a Norwegian handball player for Győri ETO KC and the Norwegian national team.

== National team ==
She represented Norway at the 2015 Women's Under-19 European Handball Championship, placing 6th and at the 2013 Youth European Championship, placing 7th.

She made her debut for the Norwegian national team in November 2021 against Netherlands, and a few days later she was at her first major international tournament, 2021 World Women's Handball Championship in Spain. In her first match, she scored 7 goals and was the top scorer against Kazakhstan. Norway would go on to win the tournament, beating France in the final.

At the 2022 European Championship, she and Norway won gold. Two years later she won the 2024 European Championship, beating Denmark in the final.

In 2023 she won silver medals at the 2023 World Championship, losing to France in the final.

At the 2025 World Championship she won her second World Championship gold medal. She was also selected for the All Star Team of the tournament.

== Achievements ==
- World Championship:
  - Winner: 2021, 2025
  - Silver Medalist: 2023
- European Championship:
  - Winner: 2022, 2024
- EHF Champions League:
  - Winner: 2024, 2025
- Nemzeti Bajnokság I:
  - Winner: 2025, 2026
  - Silver: 2024
- REMA 1000-ligaen:
  - Silver Medalist: 2019/2020, 2020/2021, 2021/2022
- Norwegian Cup:
  - Finalist: 2019

== Individual awards ==
All Star Team

- All-Star Right Wing of REMA 1000-ligaen: 2019/2020, 2021/2022
- All Star Right Wing of the 2025 World Women's Handball Championship

Other awards

- Topscorer of REMA 1000-ligaen: 2019/2020: (161 goals)
- Best Player of REMA 1000-ligaen: 2019/2020
- All-Star Right Wing of Kvindeligaen: 2022/2023
