= Sara Berg =

Norwegian handball player (born 2001)

Personal information
- Full name: Sara Berg
- Nationality: Norwegian
- Born: 9 September 2001 (age 25) Askøy, Norway
- Height: 1.76 m (5 ft 9 in)

Sport
- Sport: Handball
- Position: Left wing
- Current club: Larvik HK
- Number: 7

Youth career
- Years: Team
- –: Askøy IL

Senior clubs
- Years: Team
- 2017–2019: Fyllingen
- 2019–2024: Fana
- 2024–: Larvik HK
National team
Years	Team	Apps	(Gls)
2023–	Norway	5	(1)

Sara Berg (born 9 September 2001) is a Norwegian handball player for Larvik HK and the Norwegian national team.

On 28 March 2023, it was announced that Berg was transferred from the recruit team to the national team to play friendly matches against Montenegro.

== Achievements ==
- REMA 1000-ligaen:
  - Bronze: 2024/2025
- Norwegian Cup:
  - Finalist: 2025
