= Flint Tønsberg =

Norwegian handball club

- Short name: Flint
- Founded: 28 April 1917; 109 years ago
- Arena: REMA 1000 Arena, Tønsberg
- Capacity: 700
- Head coach: Khaled Chentout
- League: 1st Division
- 2025–26: 1st
- Club colours

Flint Tønsberg is the women's handball team of the Norwegian multi-sports club IL Flint based in Tønsberg, Vestfold. The team plays in Elkjøp-ligaen, the top division in the country, since its promotion in 2026.

== Team ==
=== Current squad ===
Squad for the 2026–27 season

Goalkeepers

- 1 (Denmark) Vivi Storvang
- 16 (Norway) Ingrid Lauritzen
- 16 (Norway) Emili Hoff Markgren

Wingers
RW

- 3 (Norway) Lise Aggerholm Brunsvik
- 15 (Norway) Marte Kraby Simenstad

LW

- 4 (Norway) Leah Berg Pejby
- 7 (Norway) Marlin Swift-Johannessen

Line players

- 6 (Norway) Emilie Alexandra Helgerud
- 18 (Norway) Amalie Mogstad

Back players
LB

- 9 (Norway) Ylva Vegard Aurmo
- 11 (Norway) Emeli Sørvik-Hansen
- 14 (Norway) Karoline Kleven
- 20 (Norway) Mia Viljugrein
- 26 (Norway) Mia Landsrød Haug

CB

- 2 (Norway) Andrea Landsrød Haug
- 8 (Norway) Ona Vegard Aurmo
- 13 (Norway) Embla Eriksen

RB

=== Transfers ===
Transfers for the 2026–27 season

Joining

- (Norway) Emeli Sørvik-Hansen (LB) (from own rows)
- (Norway) Mia Landsrød Haug (LB) (from (Norway) Teie HK)

Leaving

- (Norway) Synne Berg (LB) (to (Norway) Storhamar IL)
- (Norway) Helene Klæstad Sandnes (RB) (to (Norway) Storhamar IL)
- (Norway) Maren Vilje Warset (P) (retires)

=== Technical staff ===
- Head coach: Khaled Chentout
- Assistant coach:

=== Notable former club players ===
- (Norway) Emily Stang Sando
- (Norway) Renate Saastad Sømme
- (Norway) Ellen Marie Folkvord
- (Norway) Pia Narvesen
- (Norway) Marianne Iversen
- (Norway) Kristiane Stormoen
- (Norway) Mari Finstad Bergum
- (Norway) Eline Fagerheim
- (Norway) Mia Vik Gabrielsen
- (Norway) Nora Bugge
- (Norway) Synne Fossheim
- (Norway) Anna Klausen Jacobsen
- (Norway) Kristiane Stormoen
- (Norway) Henriette Jarneid
- (Norway) Charlotte Koffeld Iversen
- (Norway) Andrea Varvin Fredriksen
- (Norway) Celina Vatne
- (Norway) Sanne Løkka Hagen
- (Norway) Zaynab Elmrani
- (Brazil) Gabriela Moreschi
- (Denmark) Karoline Fahlberg
