= Anniken Obaidli =

Norwegian handball player (born 1995)

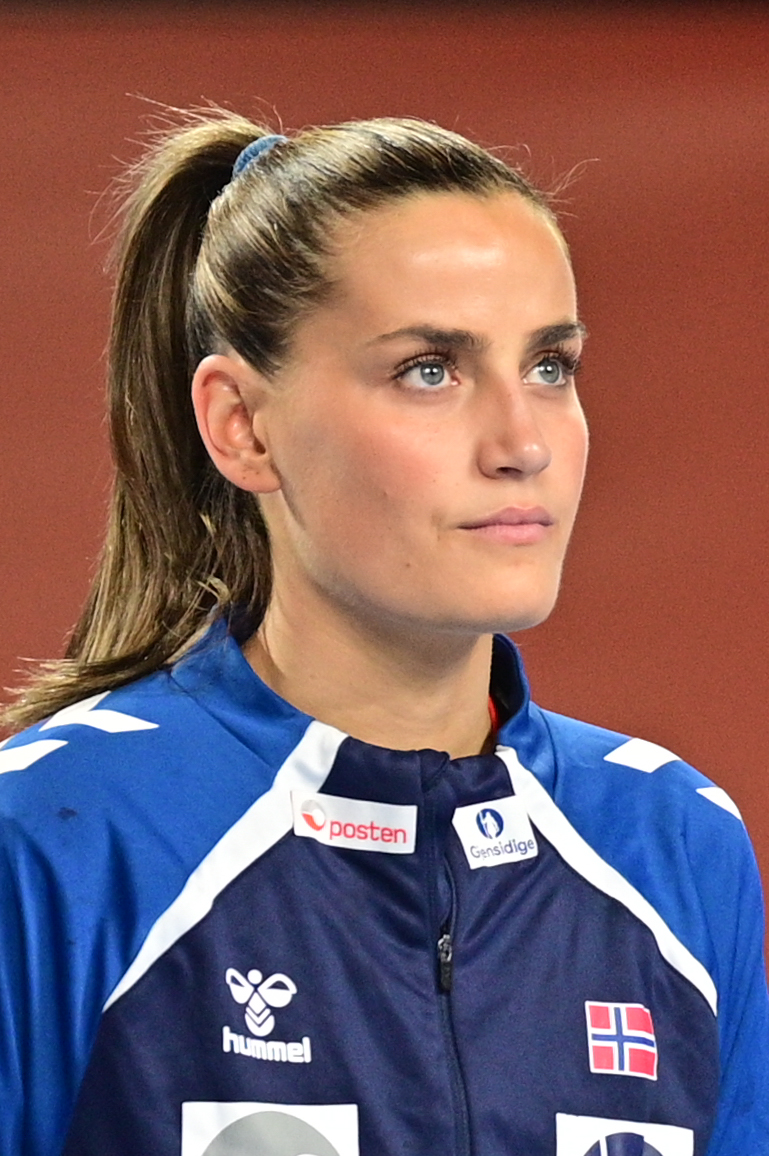
- Obaidli in 2024

Personal information
- Nationality: Norwegian
- Born: 22 June 1995 (age 31) Molde, Norway
- Height: 1.68 m (5 ft 6 in)

Sport
- Sport: Handball
- Position: Centre back
- Current club: Storhamar HE
- Number: 25

Youth career
- Years: Team
- –2011: Molde HK

Senior clubs
- Years: Team
- 2011–2021: Molde HK
- 2014: → Tertnes HE (cooperation)
- 2021–2026: Storhamar HE
- 2026–: Molde Elite
National team
Years	Team	Apps	(Gls)
2015–	Norway	24	(27)
Medal record
World Championship
Gold medal – first place	2025 Germany/Netherlands
European Championship
Gold medal – first place	2024 Austria/Hungary/Switzerland
Youth World Championship
Bronze medal – third place	2012 Montenegro
Youth European Championship
Bronze medal – third place	2011 Czech Republic

Anniken Obaidli (born 22 June 1995) is a Norwegian handball player who plays for Storhamar HE and the Norwegian national team.

She also represented Norway in 2014 Women's Junior World Handball Championship, placing 9th.

She won her first gold medal at the 2024 European Championship, beating Denmark in the final.

At the 2025 World Championship she was part of the Norwegian team that won World Championship gold medals.

== Achievements ==
- World Championship:
  - Winner: 2025
- European Championship:
  - Winner: 2024
- Youth European Championship:
  - Bronze Medalist: 2011
- World Youth Championship:
  - Bronze Medalist: 2012
- European Championship:
  - Winner: 2024
- EHF European League:
  - Winner: 2023/2024
- Norwegian League
  - Gold: 2024/2025
  - Silver: 2021/2022, 2022/2023, 2023/2024, 2025/2026
- Norwegian Cup:
  - Winner: 2024, 2025
  - Finalist: 2023/2024

== Individual awards ==
- All-Star Centre Back of REMA 1000-ligaen: 2022/2023
- Eliteserien's "public favorite": 2019/2020
- NISO Best Young Player of the Year: 2015/2016
- Best Rookie of Grundigligaen: 2015/2016

== Personal life ==
Her father is from Bahrain. Her younger sister Mona Obaidli is also a handball player, who plays for Danish site Nykøbing Falster Håndboldklub.
