= Fana Håndball =

Norwegian handball club

Fana IL Håndball
- Short name: Fana
- Founded: 1945; 81 years ago
- Arena: Fana Arena, Bergen
- Capacity: 1206
- Head coach: Erlend Lyssand
- League: REMA 1000-ligaen
- 2025–26: 7th
- Club colours
Home	Away

Fana Håndball is the women's handball team of the Norwegian multi-sports club Fana IL based in Bergen. The team plays in REMA 1000-ligaen, the top division in the country, since its historical promotion on 14 March 2018.

Another historic event happened on 10 December 2022, when they qualified for the 2022–23 Women's EHF European League, for the first time in the club's history.

== Team ==
=== Current squad ===
Squad for the 2026–27 season

Goalkeepers

- 1 (Norway) Sofie Grønlund
- 12 (Norway) Marie Davidsen (pregnant)
- 16 (Norway) Leah Bjotveit Verpeide
- 20 (Norway) Elea Josefine Brundin Vindenes
- 40 (Norway) Haya Elhanafi

Right wing

- 4 (Norway) Linnea Skadal Kyrkjeeide
- 00 (Norway) Henrikke Hauge Kjølholdt

Left wing

- 3 (Norway) Sara Hallingstad
- 7 (Norway) Ingeborg Storbæk Monné

Line players

- 11 (Norway) Anna Mortvedt
- 14 (Norway) Eline Mangen Solbakken

Left back

- 2 (Norway) Emily Lønnestad-Wiers
- 22 (Norway) Emma Gloppestad
- 27 (Norway) Aurora Kjellevold Hatle

Centre back

- 10 (Norway) Christine Karlsen Alver
- 15 (Norway) Marie Mjøs
- 21 (Norway) Evita Naper Lindberget

Right back

- 9 (Norway) Frida Aasekjær Wilkensen
- 17 (Norway) Celine Solstad

=== Transfers ===
Transfers for the 2026–27 season

Joining

- (Norway) Ingeborg Storbæk Monné (LW) (from (Norway) Storhamar HE)
- (Norway) Celine Solstad (RB) (from (France) ESBF Besançon)
- (Norway) Henrikke Hauge Kjølholdt (RW) (from (Norway) Molde Elite)

Leaving

- (Norway) Benedikte Kalstad Hernes (GK) (to (Norway) Fyllingen IL)
- (Norway) Martine Kårigstad Andersen (LB) (to (Norway) Sola HK)
- (Norway) Eline Osland (CB) (to (Denmark) Fredericia HK)
- (Norway) Lina Waage Mossestad (CB)
- (Norway) Andrea Varvin Fredriksen (LW)
- (Norway) Maren Eriksen Langø (LW)
- (Norway) Sara Osen Tefre (RW) (to (Norway) Os IL)
- (Norway) Fride Heggdal Stølen (P) (to (Norway) Sola HK) effective immediately

=== Technical staff ===
- Head coach: Vidar Gjesdal
- Assistant coach: Marius Beck

=== Notable former national team players ===
- (Norway) Emilie Hovden
- (Norway) Olivia Lykke Nygaard
- (Norway) Oda Mastad
- (Norway) Sara Berg
- (Norway) Celine Solstad

=== Notable former club players ===
- (Norway) Josefine Gundersen Lien
- (Norway) Maren Roll Lied
- (Sweden) Thea Stankiewicz
- (Norway) Catharina Skorpen Furnes
- (Norway) Synna Lien
- (Norway) Sofie Grønlund
- (Norway) Sofie Vinde Norum
- (Norway) Candy Jabateh
- (Norway) Andrea Solstad
- (Norway) Dina Frisendal
- (Norway) Mille Brekken Daae
- (Norway) Marit Ova Bøyum

=== Individual awards in REMA 1000-ligaen ===
Season	Player	Award
2018–19	(Norway) Christine Karlsen Alver	Rookie
2021–22	(Norway) Christine Karlsen Alver	Centre back
2021–22	(Norway) Christine Karlsen Alver	Top scorer (206 goals)
2022–23	(Norway) Olivia Lykke Nygaard	Goalkeeper

== Statistics ==
=== Top scorers in REMA 1000-ligaen ===
(All-Time) – Last updated on 23 April 2023

Rank	Name	Seasons played	Goals
1	(Norway) Christine Karlsen Alver	4	517
2	(Norway) Celine Solstad	5	432
3	(Norway) Oda Mastad	5	281
4	(Norway) Aurora Kjellevold Hatle	5	272
5	(Norway) Sara Berg	4	242
6	(Norway) Andrea Martine Solstad	5	210
7	(Norway) Sofie Vinde Norum	4	193
8	(Norway) Marit Ova Bøyum	4	147
9	(Norway) Emilie Hovden	1	131
10	(Norway) Maren Gabrielsen	4	84

Highlighted players are still playing for the club.

=== Top scorers in EHF European League ===
(All-Time) – Last updated on 18 February 2023

Rank	Name	Seasons played	Goals
1	(Norway) Sara Berg	1	60
2	(Norway) Aurora Kjellevold Hatle	1	48
3	(Norway) Celine Solstad	1	45
4	(Norway) Oda Mastad	1	22
5	(Norway) Marte Haaland	1	17
6	(Norway) Marit Ova Bøyum	1	16
7	(Norway) Maren Gabrielsen	1	13
8	(Norway) Linnea Skadal Kyrkjeeide	1	12
9	(Norway) Lina Waage Mossestad	1	11
10	(Norway) Andrea Martine Solstad	1	7

== European record ==
Season	Competition	Round	Club	1st leg	2nd leg	Aggregate
2022–23	EHF European League	QR2	(Switzerland) SPONO Eagles	36–21	28–31	64–52
2022–23	EHF European League	QR3	(Germany) Buxtehuder SV	28–21	23–25	51–46
2022–23	EHF European League	GP	(Denmark) Ikast Handbold	24–35	23–29	4th place
2022–23	EHF European League	GP	(Hungary) Motherson Mosonmagyaróvári KC	29–35	25–28	4th place
2022–23	EHF European League	GP	(France) Neptunes de Nantes	30–28	21–29	4th place
