= Aker Topphåndball =

Norwegian handball club

- Short name: Aker
- Founded: 21 July 2016; 10 years ago
- Arena: Ullern Flebruksshall, Ullern
- Capacity: 250
- President: Thomas Amdahl Skorpen
- Head coach: Lars Harald Abelsen
- League: REMA 1000-ligaen
- 2021-22: 10th
- Club colours
Home	Away

Aker Topphåndball is a Norwegian women's handball club from Bygdøy, Oslo, Norway. It was established in the 2016. It took over the league licence from Njård IL and Ullern IF and is playing in the Eliteserien. They usually play in black shirts and black shorts.

== Arena ==
- Arena: Ullern Flebruksshall, Ullern
- City: Oslo
- Capacity: 250
- Address:

== Team ==
=== Current squad ===
Squad for the 2023-24 season.

Goalkeepers

- 1 (Norway) Maren Austmo Pedersen
- 12 (Norway) Tora Charlotte Tande-Elton

LW

- 10 (Norway) Selin Kamburce
- 22 (Denmark) Freja Vinter Christensen
- 24 (Norway) Stella Waagan Kruse

RW

- 5 (Norway) Oda Caroline Mørk
- 8 (Norway) Linnea Hareton
- 17 (Norway) Elisa Mulaj

Line players

- 3 (Norway) Maria Keiserås Haugen
- 11 (Norway) Marte Sirén Figenschau
- 23 (Norway) Una Edholm Straith

Back players

- 4 (Norway) Lea Tidemann Stenvik
- 7 (Norway) Angunn Gudmestad
- 9 (Norway) Mari Myrland
- 14 (Norway) Ine Erlandsen Grimsrud
- 15 (Norway) Jenny Bing Husaas
- 19 (Norway) Marie Loka Øydna
- 20 (Norway) Mia Kristin Syverud
- 21 (Norway) Sofie Donna Aasland Lae

=== Transfers ===
Transfers for the 2024-25 season

Joining

Leaving

- (Norway) Lars Abelsen (Head coach) effective immediately
- (Norway) Maren Austmo Pedersen (GK) (to (Norway) Byåsen HE)
- (Norway) Lea Tidemann Stenvik (CB) (to (Norway) Gjerpen HK Skien)
- (Norway) Angunn Gudmestad (LB/CB) (to (Germany) Neckarsulmer SU)
- (Norway) Tora Tande-Elton (GK) (to (Norway) Follo HK Damer)
- (Norway) Oda Caroline Mørk (RW) (to (Norway) Follo HK Damer)
- (Norway) Mari Myrland (LB) (to (Norway) Follo HK Damer)
- (Norway) Maria Keiserås Haugen (P) (to (Norway) Oppsal Håndball)
- (Norway) Marte Sirén Figenschau (P) (to (Norway) Follo HK Damer)
- (Denmark) Freja Vinter Christensen (LW) (to (Norway) Byåsen HE)
- (Norway) Ine Erlandsen Grimsrud (CB) (to (Norway) Sola HK)

=== Technical staff ===
- Head coach: Lars Harald Abelsen
- Assistant coach: Atle Stenvik

=== Notable former National Team players ===
- (Norway) Tuva Høve
- (Norway) Ane Høgseth
- (Norway) Olivia Lykke Nygaard
- (Norway) Stella Waagan Kruse

=== Notable former club players ===
- (Norway) Mathilde Rivas Toft
- (Norway) Marielle Martinsen
- (Norway) Karoline Lund
- (United Kingdom) (Norway) Zoe van der Weel
- (Norway) Janne Håvelsrud Eklo
- (Norway) Marthine Svendsberget
- (Norway) Rikke Midtfjeld
- (Norway) Marielle Daae Nordvang
- (Norway) Henriette Jarnang
- (Norway) Maren Austmo Pedersen
- (Norway) Lea Tidemann Stenvik
- (Norway) Angunn Gudmestad
- (Norway) Tora Tande-Elton
- (Norway) Oda Caroline Mørk
- (Norway) Mari Myrland
- (Norway) Maria Keiserås Haugen
- (Norway) Marte Sirén Figenschau
- (Norway) Ine Erlandsen Grimsrud
- (Norway) Selin Kamburce
- (Denmark) Freja Vinter Christensen
