= 2024–25 Women's EHF European League group stage =

European handball tournament

Tournament information
- Sport: Handball
- Date: 11 January – 23 February 2025
- Teams: 16 (from 8 countries)
- Website: ehfel.com

The 2024–25 Women's EHF European League group stage was played between 11 January and 23 February 2025 to determine the eight teams advancing to the knockout stage of the 2024–25 Women's EHF European League.

== Draw ==
The draw took place on the 21 November 2024 at 11:00 CET in Vienna, Austria. The only restriction was that clubs from the same country cannot be in the same group. Bold indicates who advanced to the knockout stage.

=== Seeding ===
| Pot 1 | Pot 2 | Pot 3 | Pot 4 |
|---|---|---|---|
| (Denmark) **Ikast Håndbold** (Germany) **HSG Bensheim/Auerbach** (Hungary) Mosonmagyaróvári KC SE (Romania) **HC Dunărea Brăila** | (France) Paris 92 (Germany) **HSG Blomberg-Lippe** (Germany) **Thüringer HC** (Norway) Sola HK | (Spain) Atticgo BM Elche (Germany) Borussia Dortmund (Norway) Fredrikstad BK (Poland) KGHM MKS Zagłębie Lubin | (Spain) **Super Amara Bera Bera** (France) **JDA Bourgogne Dijon HB** (Norway) Larvik HK (Romania) **SCM Râmnicu Vâlcea** |

== Format ==
In each group, teams played against each other in a double round-robin format, with home and away matches.

== Tiebreakers ==
In the group stage, teams were ranked according to points (2 points for a win, 1 point for a draw, 0 points for a loss), and if tied on points, the following tiebreaking criteria were applied, in the order given, to determine the rankings:

1. Points in matches among tied teams;
2. Goal difference in matches among tied teams;
3. Goal difference in all group matches;
4. Goals scored in all group matches;
5. If more than two teams were tied, and after applying all head-to-head criteria above, a subset of teams were still tied, all head-to-head criteria above were reapplied exclusively to this subset of teams;
6. Drawing lots.

== Groups ==
=== Group A ===
| Pos | Team | Pld | W | D | L | GF | GA | GD | Pts | Qualification | DUN | THC | LHK | ELC |
|---|---|---|---|---|---|---|---|---|---|---|---|---|---|---|
| 1 | (Romania) HC Dunărea Brăila | 6 | 4 | 1 | 1 | 179 | 161 | +18 | **9** | Quarterfinals | — | 26–22 | 33–33 | 33–15 |
| 2 | (Germany) Thüringer HC | 6 | 4 | 0 | 2 | 183 | 180 | +3 | **8** | Quarterfinals | 38–28 | — | 43–35 | 27–26 |
| 3 | (Norway) Larvik HK | 6 | 3 | 1 | 2 | 189 | 167 | +22 | **7** | | 24–27 | 38–25 | — | 30–23 |
| 4 | (Spain) Atticgo BM Elche | 6 | 0 | 0 | 6 | 136 | 179 | −43 | **0** | | 29–32 | 27–28 | 16–29 | — |

Source: EHF

| 11 January 2025; 20:00 | **Thüringer HC (Germany)** | **43–35** | **(Norway) Larvik HK** | Salza Halle, Bad Langensalza; Attendance: 1,050; Referees: Fotakidis, Kinatzidis (GRE) |
| 11 January 2025; 20:00 | Reichert 14 | (23–12) | Sæteren 8 | Salza Halle, Bad Langensalza; Attendance: 1,050; Referees: Fotakidis, Kinatzidis (GRE) |
| 11 January 2025; 20:00 | 2× (suspension) | Report | 1× (suspension) | Salza Halle, Bad Langensalza; Attendance: 1,050; Referees: Fotakidis, Kinatzidis (GRE) |

| 12 January 2025; 15:00 | **HC Dunărea Brăila (Romania)** | **33–15** | **(Spain) Atticgo BM Elche** | Romeo Iamandi Sports Hall, Buzău; Attendance: 2,000; Referees: Fahner, Kubis (POL) |
| 12 January 2025; 15:00 | González, Ježić 6 | (13–7) | Méndez 6 | Romeo Iamandi Sports Hall, Buzău; Attendance: 2,000; Referees: Fahner, Kubis (POL) |
| 12 January 2025; 15:00 | 1× (yellow card) 4× (suspension) | Report | 1× (yellow card) 6× (suspension) | Romeo Iamandi Sports Hall, Buzău; Attendance: 2,000; Referees: Fahner, Kubis (POL) |

| 18 January 2025; 15:00 | **Larvik HK (Norway)** | **24–27** | **(Romania) HC Dunărea Brăila** | Jotron Arena, Larvik; Attendance: 536; Referees: Rauchs, Linster (LUX) |
| 18 January 2025; 15:00 | Hulleberg, Ramberg 5 | (11–13) | Ježić 7 | Jotron Arena, Larvik; Attendance: 536; Referees: Rauchs, Linster (LUX) |
| 18 January 2025; 15:00 | 1× (yellow card) 1× (suspension) | Report | 3× (suspension) | Jotron Arena, Larvik; Attendance: 536; Referees: Rauchs, Linster (LUX) |

| 18 January 2025; 20:00 | **Atticgo BM Elche (Spain)** | **27–28** | **(Germany) Thüringer HC** | Pabellón Esperanza Lag, Elche; Attendance: 612; Referees: Maia, Nunes (POR) |
| 18 January 2025; 20:00 | Rosa 10 | (11–15) | Reichert 10 | Pabellón Esperanza Lag, Elche; Attendance: 612; Referees: Maia, Nunes (POR) |
| 18 January 2025; 20:00 | 3× (suspension) | Report | 1× (yellow card) 4× (suspension) | Pabellón Esperanza Lag, Elche; Attendance: 612; Referees: Maia, Nunes (POR) |

| 25 January 2025; 20:00 | **Atticgo BM Elche (Spain)** | **16–29** | **(Norway) Larvik HK** | Pabellón Esperanza Lag, Elche; Attendance: 700; Referees: Picard, Vauchez (FRA) |
| 25 January 2025; 20:00 | Ignjatović 5 | (5–12) | Berg 6 | Pabellón Esperanza Lag, Elche; Attendance: 700; Referees: Picard, Vauchez (FRA) |
| 25 January 2025; 20:00 | 5× (suspension) | Report | 5× (suspension) | Pabellón Esperanza Lag, Elche; Attendance: 700; Referees: Picard, Vauchez (FRA) |

| 26 January 2025; 19:00 | **HC Dunărea Brăila (Romania)** | **26–22** | **(Germany) Thüringer HC** | Romeo Iamandi Sports Hall, Buzău; Attendance: 1,900; Referees: Jakovljević, Kovačević (SRB) |
| 26 January 2025; 19:00 | Ježić 5 | (12–11) | Hendrikse 6 | Romeo Iamandi Sports Hall, Buzău; Attendance: 1,900; Referees: Jakovljević, Kovačević (SRB) |
| 26 January 2025; 19:00 | 1× (yellow card) 1× (suspension) | Report | 2× (yellow card) 1× (suspension) | Romeo Iamandi Sports Hall, Buzău; Attendance: 1,900; Referees: Jakovljević, Kovačević (SRB) |

| 8 February 2025; 18:00 | **Larvik HK (Norway)** | **30–23** | **(Spain) Atticgo BM Elche** | Jotron Arena, Larvik; Attendance: 447; Referees: Marton, Dáné (HUN) |
| 8 February 2025; 18:00 | Sæteren 7 | (16–9) | Figueiredo 7 | Jotron Arena, Larvik; Attendance: 447; Referees: Marton, Dáné (HUN) |
| 8 February 2025; 18:00 | 1× (suspension) | Report | 4× (suspension) | Jotron Arena, Larvik; Attendance: 447; Referees: Marton, Dáné (HUN) |

| 8 February 2025; 20:00 | **Thüringer HC (Germany)** | **38–28** | **(Romania) HC Dunărea Brăila** | Salza Halle, Bad Langensalza; Attendance: 1,800; Referees: Pagh, Thygesen (DEN) |
| 8 February 2025; 20:00 | Reichert 12 | (16–11) | González 6 | Salza Halle, Bad Langensalza; Attendance: 1,800; Referees: Pagh, Thygesen (DEN) |
| 8 February 2025; 20:00 | 2× (suspension) | Report | 1× (yellow card) 2× (suspension) | Salza Halle, Bad Langensalza; Attendance: 1,800; Referees: Pagh, Thygesen (DEN) |

| 15 February 2025; 16:00 | **Larvik HK (Norway)** | **38–25** | **(Germany) Thüringer HC** | Jotron Arena, Larvik; Attendance: 466; Referees: Watson, Welin (SWE) |
| 15 February 2025; 16:00 | Sæteren 12 | (20–12) | Reichert 10 | Jotron Arena, Larvik; Attendance: 466; Referees: Watson, Welin (SWE) |
| 15 February 2025; 16:00 | 3× (suspension) | Report | 2× (suspension) | Jotron Arena, Larvik; Attendance: 466; Referees: Watson, Welin (SWE) |

| 15 February 2025; 20:00 | **Atticgo BM Elche (Spain)** | **29–32** | **(Romania) HC Dunărea Brăila** | Pabellón Esperanza Lag, Elche; Attendance: 800; Referees: Schaad, Müller (SUI) |
| 15 February 2025; 20:00 | Figueiredo 9 | (10–14) | González 6 | Pabellón Esperanza Lag, Elche; Attendance: 800; Referees: Schaad, Müller (SUI) |
| 15 February 2025; 20:00 | 2× (yellow card) 2× (suspension) | Report | 1× (yellow card) 2× (suspension) | Pabellón Esperanza Lag, Elche; Attendance: 800; Referees: Schaad, Müller (SUI) |

| 22 February 2025; 16:00 | **Thüringer HC (Germany)** | **27–26** | **(Spain) Atticgo BM Elche** | Salza Halle, Bad Langensalza; Attendance: 1,050; Referees: Uhlíř, Beňuš (CZE) |
| 22 February 2025; 16:00 | Kuczora 10 | (13–15) | Figueiredo 9 | Salza Halle, Bad Langensalza; Attendance: 1,050; Referees: Uhlíř, Beňuš (CZE) |
| 22 February 2025; 16:00 | 2× (suspension) | Report | 8× (suspension) | Salza Halle, Bad Langensalza; Attendance: 1,050; Referees: Uhlíř, Beňuš (CZE) |

| 23 February 2025; 15:00 | **HC Dunărea Brăila (Romania)** | **33–33** | **(Norway) Larvik HK** | Romeo Iamandi Sports Hall, Buzău; Attendance: 2,140; Referees: Radčenko, Pērsis (LAT) |
| 23 February 2025; 15:00 | Ježić 9 | (17–13) | Ramberg, Sæteren 7 | Romeo Iamandi Sports Hall, Buzău; Attendance: 2,140; Referees: Radčenko, Pērsis (LAT) |
| 23 February 2025; 15:00 | 1× (suspension) | Report | 1× (suspension) | Romeo Iamandi Sports Hall, Buzău; Attendance: 2,140; Referees: Radčenko, Pērsis (LAT) |

=== Group B ===
| Pos | Team | Pld | W | D | L | GF | GA | GD | Pts | Qualification | VAL | IKA | DOR | SOL |
|---|---|---|---|---|---|---|---|---|---|---|---|---|---|---|
| 1 | (Romania) SCM Râmnicu Vâlcea | 6 | 4 | 1 | 1 | 194 | 183 | +11 | **9** | Quarterfinals | — | 27–26 | 32–27 | 32–29 |
| 2 | (Denmark) Ikast Håndbold | 6 | 4 | 0 | 2 | 185 | 176 | +9 | **8** | Quarterfinals | 36–34 | — | 29–25 | 35–34 |
| 3 | (Germany) Borussia Dortmund | 6 | 2 | 1 | 3 | 172 | 179 | −7 | **5** | | 31–31 | 30–27 | — | 29–28 |
| 4 | (Norway) Sola HK | 6 | 1 | 0 | 5 | 183 | 196 | −13 | **2** | | 34–38 | 26–32 | 32–30 | — |

Source: EHF

| 12 January 2025; 18:00 | **Ikast Håndbold (Denmark)** | **35–34** | **(Norway) Sola HK** | IBF Arena, Ikast; Attendance: 1,077; Referees: Schaad, Müller (SUI) |
| 12 January 2025; 18:00 | Petersen 7 | (14–15) | Holta 9 | IBF Arena, Ikast; Attendance: 1,077; Referees: Schaad, Müller (SUI) |
| 12 January 2025; 18:00 | 3× (suspension) | Report | 3× (suspension) | IBF Arena, Ikast; Attendance: 1,077; Referees: Schaad, Müller (SUI) |

| 12 January 2025; 18:00 | **Borussia Dortmund (Germany)** | **31–31** | **(Romania) SCM Râmnicu Vâlcea** | Westpress Arena, Hamm; Attendance: 912; Referees: Härgin, Makejev (EST) |
| 12 January 2025; 18:00 | Campos 9 | (14–16) | Hagman, Maidhof, Zschocke 5 | Westpress Arena, Hamm; Attendance: 912; Referees: Härgin, Makejev (EST) |
| 12 January 2025; 18:00 | 1× (suspension) | Report | 4× (suspension) | Westpress Arena, Hamm; Attendance: 912; Referees: Härgin, Makejev (EST) |

| 19 January 2025; 15:00 | **SCM Râmnicu Vâlcea (Romania)** | **27–26** | **(Denmark) Ikast Håndbold** | Traian Sports Hall, Râmnicu Vâlcea; Attendance: 1,949; Referees: Charitsos, Naskos (GRE) |
| 19 January 2025; 15:00 | Maidhof 6 | (15–15) | Bakkerud 7 | Traian Sports Hall, Râmnicu Vâlcea; Attendance: 1,949; Referees: Charitsos, Naskos (GRE) |
| 19 January 2025; 15:00 | 3× (suspension) | Report | 2× (suspension) | Traian Sports Hall, Râmnicu Vâlcea; Attendance: 1,949; Referees: Charitsos, Naskos (GRE) |

| 19 January 2025; 16:00 | **Sola HK (Norway)** | **32–30** | **(Germany) Borussia Dortmund** | Stavanger Idrettshall, Stavanger; Attendance: 1,007; Referees: Klompers, Stobbe (NED) |
| 19 January 2025; 16:00 | Holta 8 | (18–14) | Bleckmann 8 | Stavanger Idrettshall, Stavanger; Attendance: 1,007; Referees: Klompers, Stobbe (NED) |
| 19 January 2025; 16:00 | 1× (yellow card) 6× (suspension) 1× (red card) | Report | 1× (yellow card) 5× (suspension) | Stavanger Idrettshall, Stavanger; Attendance: 1,007; Referees: Klompers, Stobbe (NED) |

| 25 January 2025; 16:00 | **Ikast Håndbold (Denmark)** | **29–25** | **(Germany) Borussia Dortmund** | IBF Arena, Ikast; Attendance: 1,123; Referees: Radčenko, Pērsis (LAT) |
| 25 January 2025; 16:00 | Skogrand 6 | (12–11) | Degenhardt 7 | IBF Arena, Ikast; Attendance: 1,123; Referees: Radčenko, Pērsis (LAT) |
| 25 January 2025; 16:00 | 1× (suspension) | Report | 5× (suspension) | IBF Arena, Ikast; Attendance: 1,123; Referees: Radčenko, Pērsis (LAT) |

| 25 January 2025; 19:00 | **SCM Râmnicu Vâlcea (Romania)** | **32–29** | **(Norway) Sola HK** | Traian Sports Hall, Râmnicu Vâlcea; Attendance: 1,850; Referees: Oyarzun, Zaragüeta (SPA) |
| 25 January 2025; 19:00 | Wollik 7 | (14–14) | Holta 10 | Traian Sports Hall, Râmnicu Vâlcea; Attendance: 1,850; Referees: Oyarzun, Zaragüeta (SPA) |
| 25 January 2025; 19:00 | 2× (suspension) | Report | 1× (suspension) | Traian Sports Hall, Râmnicu Vâlcea; Attendance: 1,850; Referees: Oyarzun, Zaragüeta (SPA) |

| 8 February 2025; 16:00 | **Sola HK (Norway)** | **34–38** | **(Romania) SCM Râmnicu Vâlcea** | Stavanger idrettshall, Stavanger; Attendance: 728; Referees: Iovcev, Ioncev (BUL) |
| 8 February 2025; 16:00 | Holta 14 | (15–12) | Zschocke 9 | Stavanger idrettshall, Stavanger; Attendance: 728; Referees: Iovcev, Ioncev (BUL) |
| 8 February 2025; 16:00 | 1× (yellow card) 3× (suspension) | Report | 1× (yellow card) 4× (suspension) | Stavanger idrettshall, Stavanger; Attendance: 728; Referees: Iovcev, Ioncev (BUL) |

| 9 February 2025; 14:00 | **Borussia Dortmund (Germany)** | **30–27** | **(Denmark) Ikast Håndbold** | Westpress Arena, Hamm; Attendance: 550; Referees: Fabryczny, Rawicki (POL) |
| 9 February 2025; 14:00 | Bleckmann 6 | (12–10) | Skogrand 9 | Westpress Arena, Hamm; Attendance: 550; Referees: Fabryczny, Rawicki (POL) |
| 9 February 2025; 14:00 | 3× (suspension) | Report | 1× (yellow card) 3× (suspension) | Westpress Arena, Hamm; Attendance: 550; Referees: Fabryczny, Rawicki (POL) |

| 15 February 2025; 18:00 | **Sola HK (Norway)** | **26–32** | **(Denmark) Ikast Håndbold** | Stavanger idrettshall, Stavanger; Attendance: 986; Referees: Pétursson, Þrastarson (ISL) |
| 15 February 2025; 18:00 | Holta 10 | (14–14) | Nolsøe, Roberts 6 | Stavanger idrettshall, Stavanger; Attendance: 986; Referees: Pétursson, Þrastarson (ISL) |
| 15 February 2025; 18:00 | 1× (yellow card) 4× (suspension) | Report | 2× (suspension) | Stavanger idrettshall, Stavanger; Attendance: 986; Referees: Pétursson, Þrastarson (ISL) |

| 15 February 2025; 19:00 | **SCM Râmnicu Vâlcea (Romania)** | **32–27** | **(Germany) Borussia Dortmund** | Traian Sports Hall, Râmnicu Vâlcea; Attendance: 2,239; Referees: Picard, Vauchez (FRA) |
| 15 February 2025; 19:00 | Hagman 7 | (18–10) | Bleckmann 6 | Traian Sports Hall, Râmnicu Vâlcea; Attendance: 2,239; Referees: Picard, Vauchez (FRA) |
| 15 February 2025; 19:00 | 1× (suspension) | Report | 2× (suspension) 1× (red card) | Traian Sports Hall, Râmnicu Vâlcea; Attendance: 2,239; Referees: Picard, Vauchez (FRA) |

| 22 February 2025; 15:00 | **Borussia Dortmund (Germany)** | **29–28** | **(Norway) Sola HK** | Schwelm ArENa, Schwelm; Attendance: 9,305; Referees: Charitsos, Naskos (GRE) |
| 22 February 2025; 15:00 | Bleckmann, Lassource 7 | (19–14) | Holta 8 | Schwelm ArENa, Schwelm; Attendance: 9,305; Referees: Charitsos, Naskos (GRE) |
| 22 February 2025; 15:00 | 1× (yellow card) 3× (suspension) | Report | 1× (yellow card) 1× (suspension) | Schwelm ArENa, Schwelm; Attendance: 9,305; Referees: Charitsos, Naskos (GRE) |

| 22 February 2025; 18:00 | **Ikast Håndbold (Denmark)** | **36–34** | **(Romania) SCM Râmnicu Vâlcea** | IBF Arena, Ikast; Attendance: 832; Referees: Klompers, Stobbe (NED) |
| 22 February 2025; 18:00 | Roberts 8 | (18–17) | Maidhof 6 | IBF Arena, Ikast; Attendance: 832; Referees: Klompers, Stobbe (NED) |
| 22 February 2025; 18:00 | 1× (yellow card) 4× (suspension) | Report | 2× (yellow card) 3× (suspension) | IBF Arena, Ikast; Attendance: 832; Referees: Klompers, Stobbe (NED) |

=== Group C ===
| Pos | Team | Pld | W | D | L | GF | GA | GD | Pts | Qualification | LIP | DIJ | LUB | MOS |
|---|---|---|---|---|---|---|---|---|---|---|---|---|---|---|
| 1 | (Germany) HSG Blomberg-Lippe | 6 | 5 | 0 | 1 | 184 | 172 | +12 | **10** | Quarterfinals | — | 35–30 | 27–26 | 33–28 |
| 2 | (France) JDA Bourgogne Dijon HB | 6 | 3 | 0 | 3 | 190 | 175 | +15 | **6 (Note: JDA Bourgogne Dijon HB 59–53 KGHM MKS Zagłębie Lubin)** | Quarterfinals | 27–28 | — | 27–29 | 38–29 |
| 3 | (Poland) KGHM MKS Zagłębie Lubin | 6 | 3 | 0 | 3 | 164 | 175 | −11 | **6** | | 29–27 | 24–32 | — | 31–29 |
| 4 | (Hungary) Motherson Mosonmagyaróvár | 6 | 1 | 0 | 5 | 181 | 197 | −16 | **2** | | 32–34 | 30–36 | 33–25 | — |

Source: EHF
Notes:

| 11 January 2025; 16:00 | **KGHM MKS Zagłębie Lubin (Poland)** | **31–29** | **(Hungary) Mosonmagyaróvári KC** | Hala Widowiskowo Sportowa RCS, Lubin; Attendance: 2,906; Referees: Bočáková, Jánošíková (SVK) |
| 11 January 2025; 16:00 | Promis 12 | (17–15) | G. Tóth 5 | Hala Widowiskowo Sportowa RCS, Lubin; Attendance: 2,906; Referees: Bočáková, Jánošíková (SVK) |
| 11 January 2025; 16:00 | 4× (suspension) | Report | 3× (suspension) | Hala Widowiskowo Sportowa RCS, Lubin; Attendance: 2,906; Referees: Bočáková, Jánošíková (SVK) |

| 11 January 2025; 16:00 | **HSG Blomberg-Lippe (Germany)** | **35–30** | **(France) JDA Bourgogne Dijon HB** | Phoenix Contact Arena, Lemgo; Attendance: 1,334; Referees: Pétursson, Þrastarson (ISL) |
| 11 January 2025; 16:00 | Kühne 10 | (18–17) | Dury, Urban 6 | Phoenix Contact Arena, Lemgo; Attendance: 1,334; Referees: Pétursson, Þrastarson (ISL) |
| 11 January 2025; 16:00 | 2× (yellow card) 4× (suspension) | Report | 1× (yellow card) 8× (suspension) 1× (red card) | Phoenix Contact Arena, Lemgo; Attendance: 1,334; Referees: Pétursson, Þrastarson (ISL) |

| 19 January 2025; 16:00 | **JDA Bourgogne Dijon HB (France)** | **27–29** | **(Poland) KGHM MKS Zagłębie Lubin** | Palais des Sports JM Geoffroy, Dijon; Attendance: 1,000; Referees: Fremstad, Jørstad (NOR) |
| 19 January 2025; 16:00 | Lønborg 5 | (16–16) | Kochaniak-Sala 8 | Palais des Sports JM Geoffroy, Dijon; Attendance: 1,000; Referees: Fremstad, Jørstad (NOR) |
| 19 January 2025; 16:00 | 2× (suspension) | Report | 2× (suspension) | Palais des Sports JM Geoffroy, Dijon; Attendance: 1,000; Referees: Fremstad, Jørstad (NOR) |

| 19 January 2025; 16:00 | **Mosonmagyaróvári KC (Hungary)** | **32–34** | **(Germany) HSG Blomberg-Lippe** | UFM Aréna, Mosonmagyaróvár; Attendance: 750; Referees: Sîrbu, Serdiuc (MDA) |
| 19 January 2025; 16:00 | G. Tóth 10 | (16–17) | Kühne 12 | UFM Aréna, Mosonmagyaróvár; Attendance: 750; Referees: Sîrbu, Serdiuc (MDA) |
| 19 January 2025; 16:00 | 3× (suspension) | Report | 3× (suspension) | UFM Aréna, Mosonmagyaróvár; Attendance: 750; Referees: Sîrbu, Serdiuc (MDA) |

| 26 January 2025; 16:00 | **HSG Blomberg-Lippe (Germany)** | **27–26** | **(Poland) KGHM MKS Zagłębie Lubin** | Phoenix Contact Arena, Lemgo; Attendance: 1,387; Referees: Ivanović, Vujisić (MNE) |
| 26 January 2025; 16:00 | Quist 9 | (10–13) | Promis 7 | Phoenix Contact Arena, Lemgo; Attendance: 1,387; Referees: Ivanović, Vujisić (MNE) |
| 26 January 2025; 16:00 | 3× (suspension) 1× (red card) | Report | 5× (suspension) | Phoenix Contact Arena, Lemgo; Attendance: 1,387; Referees: Ivanović, Vujisić (MNE) |

| 26 January 2025; 16:00 | **Mosonmagyaróvári KC (Hungary)** | **30–36** | **(France) JDA Bourgogne Dijon HB** | UFM Aréna, Mosonmagyaróvár; Attendance: 755; Referees: Hofer, Schmidhuber (AUT) |
| 26 January 2025; 16:00 | E. Tóth 9 | (13–14) | Offendal 8 | UFM Aréna, Mosonmagyaróvár; Attendance: 755; Referees: Hofer, Schmidhuber (AUT) |
| 26 January 2025; 16:00 | 5× (suspension) 1× (red card) | Report | 2× (yellow card) 4× (suspension) 1× (red card) | UFM Aréna, Mosonmagyaróvár; Attendance: 755; Referees: Hofer, Schmidhuber (AUT) |

| 8 February 2025; 18:00 | **KGHM MKS Zagłębie Lubin (Poland)** | **29–27** | **(Germany) HSG Blomberg-Lippe** | Hala Widowiskowo Sportowa RCS, Lubin; Attendance: 3,091; Referees: Vitaku, Vitaku (KOS) |
| 8 February 2025; 18:00 | Jakubowska 7 | (15–13) | Kühne 8 | Hala Widowiskowo Sportowa RCS, Lubin; Attendance: 3,091; Referees: Vitaku, Vitaku (KOS) |
| 8 February 2025; 18:00 | 2× (suspension) | Report | 3× (suspension) | Hala Widowiskowo Sportowa RCS, Lubin; Attendance: 3,091; Referees: Vitaku, Vitaku (KOS) |

| 9 February 2025; 16:00 | **JDA Bourgogne Dijon HB (France)** | **38–29** | **(Hungary) Mosonmagyaróvári KC** | Palais des Sports JM Geoffroy, Dijon; Attendance: 1,163; Referees: Geraets, Geraets (NED) |
| 9 February 2025; 16:00 | Pintat, Sivertsen 6 | (19–18) | Ivančok Šoltić, E. Tóth, Wolfs 5 | Palais des Sports JM Geoffroy, Dijon; Attendance: 1,163; Referees: Geraets, Geraets (NED) |
| 9 February 2025; 16:00 | 5× (suspension) | Report | 6× (suspension) | Palais des Sports JM Geoffroy, Dijon; Attendance: 1,163; Referees: Geraets, Geraets (NED) |

| 15 February 2025; 18:00 | **Mosonmagyaróvári KC (Hungary)** | **33–25** | **(Poland) KGHM MKS Zagłębie Lubin** | UFM Aréna, Mosonmagyaróvár; Attendance: 700; Referees: Kaluđerović, Vujačić (MNE) |
| 15 February 2025; 18:00 | Stranigg 12 | (16–11) | Przywara 6 | UFM Aréna, Mosonmagyaróvár; Attendance: 700; Referees: Kaluđerović, Vujačić (MNE) |
| 15 February 2025; 18:00 | 1× (yellow card) 2× (suspension) | Report | 3× (suspension) | UFM Aréna, Mosonmagyaróvár; Attendance: 700; Referees: Kaluđerović, Vujačić (MNE) |

| 15 February 2025; 20:00 | **JDA Bourgogne Dijon HB (France)** | **27–28** | **(Germany) HSG Blomberg-Lippe** | Palais des Sports JM Geoffroy, Dijon; Attendance: 1,250; Referees: Pukšič, Satler (SLO) |
| 15 February 2025; 20:00 | Dury 6 | (15–12) | Kühne 10 | Palais des Sports JM Geoffroy, Dijon; Attendance: 1,250; Referees: Pukšič, Satler (SLO) |
| 15 February 2025; 20:00 | 6× (suspension) | Report | 1× (yellow card) 4× (suspension) 1× (red card) | Palais des Sports JM Geoffroy, Dijon; Attendance: 1,250; Referees: Pukšič, Satler (SLO) |

| 22 February 2025; 18:00 | **HSG Blomberg-Lippe (Germany)** | **33–28** | **(Hungary) Mosonmagyaróvári KC** | Phoenix Contact Arena, Lemgo; Attendance: 1,223; Referees: Aylagas, Ruiz (SPA) |
| 22 February 2025; 18:00 | Quist 11 | (15–13) | G. Tóth 8 | Phoenix Contact Arena, Lemgo; Attendance: 1,223; Referees: Aylagas, Ruiz (SPA) |
| 22 February 2025; 18:00 | 1× (suspension) | Report | 1× (yellow card) 3× (suspension) | Phoenix Contact Arena, Lemgo; Attendance: 1,223; Referees: Aylagas, Ruiz (SPA) |

| 23 February 2025; 16:00 | **KGHM MKS Zagłębie Lubin (Poland)** | **24–32** | **(France) JDA Bourgogne Dijon HB** | Hala Widowiskowo Sportowa RCS, Lubin; Attendance: 3,251; Referees: Pagh, Thygesen (DEN) |
| 23 February 2025; 16:00 | Kochaniak-Sala 5 | (9–18) | patru jucătoare 5 | Hala Widowiskowo Sportowa RCS, Lubin; Attendance: 3,251; Referees: Pagh, Thygesen (DEN) |
| 23 February 2025; 16:00 | 1× (suspension) | Report | 1× (yellow card) 3× (suspension) | Hala Widowiskowo Sportowa RCS, Lubin; Attendance: 3,251; Referees: Pagh, Thygesen (DEN) |

=== Group D ===
| Pos | Team | Pld | W | D | L | GF | GA | GD | Pts | Qualification | BEN | BER | FBK | P92 |
|---|---|---|---|---|---|---|---|---|---|---|---|---|---|---|
| 1 | (Germany) HSG Bensheim-Auerbach | 6 | 6 | 0 | 0 | 189 | 161 | +28 | **12** | Quarterfinals | — | 34–32 | 32–30 | 28–24 |
| 2 | (Spain) Super Amara Bera Bera | 6 | 3 | 0 | 3 | 183 | 179 | +4 | **6** | Quarterfinals | 29–31 | — | 32–26 | 33–28 |
| 3 | (Norway) Fredrikstad BK | 6 | 2 | 0 | 4 | 173 | 182 | −9 | **4** | | 28–39 | 33–24 | — | 28–29 |
| 4 | (France) Paris 92 | 6 | 1 | 0 | 5 | 152 | 175 | −23 | **2** | | 18–25 | 27–33 | 26–28 | — |

Source: EHF

| 11 January 2025; 18:00 | **Super Amara Bera Bera (Spain)** | **33–28** | **(France) Paris 92** | Polideportivo Municipal José Antonio Gasca, San Sebastián; Attendance: 1,590; Referees: Simone, Monitillo (ITA) |
| 11 January 2025; 18:00 | Karsten 10 | (12–13) | Golvet, Thobor 6 | Polideportivo Municipal José Antonio Gasca, San Sebastián; Attendance: 1,590; Referees: Simone, Monitillo (ITA) |
| 11 January 2025; 18:00 | 4× (suspension) | Report | 1× (suspension) | Polideportivo Municipal José Antonio Gasca, San Sebastián; Attendance: 1,590; Referees: Simone, Monitillo (ITA) |

| 12 January 2025; 16:00 | **Fredrikstad BK (Norway)** | **28–39** | **(Germany) HSG Bensheim-Auerbach** | Kongstenhallen, Fredrikstad; Attendance: 703; Referees: Kinnari, Skogberg (FIN) |
| 12 January 2025; 16:00 | Dalsveen, Henriksen, Jørgensen 5 | (16–20) | Kretzschmar 10 | Kongstenhallen, Fredrikstad; Attendance: 703; Referees: Kinnari, Skogberg (FIN) |
| 12 January 2025; 16:00 | 3× (suspension) | Report | 5× (suspension) | Kongstenhallen, Fredrikstad; Attendance: 703; Referees: Kinnari, Skogberg (FIN) |

| 18 January 2025; 16:00 | **HSG Bensheim-Auerbach (Germany)** | **34–32** | **(Spain) Super Amara Bera Bera** | Untermainhalle, Elsenfeld; Attendance: 556; Referees: Geraets, Geraets (NED) |
| 18 January 2025; 16:00 | Engel 11 | (14–18) | Álvarez, Karsten 7 | Untermainhalle, Elsenfeld; Attendance: 556; Referees: Geraets, Geraets (NED) |
| 18 January 2025; 16:00 | 4× (suspension) | Report | 2× (suspension) | Untermainhalle, Elsenfeld; Attendance: 556; Referees: Geraets, Geraets (NED) |

| 18 January 2025; 20:00 | **Paris 92 (France)** | **26–28** | **(Norway) Fredrikstad BK** | Palais des sports Robert-Charpentier, Issy-les-Moulineaux; Attendance: 500; Referees: Iovcev, Ioncev (BUL) |
| 18 January 2025; 20:00 | Moretto 11 | (17–14) | Henriksen 8 | Palais des sports Robert-Charpentier, Issy-les-Moulineaux; Attendance: 500; Referees: Iovcev, Ioncev (BUL) |
| 18 January 2025; 20:00 | 1× (yellow card) 4× (suspension) | Report | 2× (suspension) | Palais des sports Robert-Charpentier, Issy-les-Moulineaux; Attendance: 500; Referees: Iovcev, Ioncev (BUL) |

| 25 January 2025; 20:00 | **Paris 92 (France)** | **18–25** | **(Germany) HSG Bensheim-Auerbach** | Palais des sports Robert-Charpentier, Issy-les-Moulineaux; Attendance: 400; Referees: Pukšič, Satler (SLO) |
| 25 January 2025; 20:00 | N'Gouan 3 | (6–15) | Engel, Hurst 4 | Palais des sports Robert-Charpentier, Issy-les-Moulineaux; Attendance: 400; Referees: Pukšič, Satler (SLO) |
| 25 January 2025; 20:00 | 1× (yellow card) 4× (suspension) | Report | | Palais des sports Robert-Charpentier, Issy-les-Moulineaux; Attendance: 400; Referees: Pukšič, Satler (SLO) |

| 26 January 2025; 18:00 | **Super Amara Bera Bera (Spain)** | **32–26** | **(Norway) Fredrikstad BK** | Polideportivo Municipal José Antonio Gasca, San Sebastián; Attendance: 1,600; Referees: Cindrić, Gonzurek (CRO) |
| 26 January 2025; 18:00 | Karsten 6 | (20–14) | Jørgensen, Dalsveen 5 | Polideportivo Municipal José Antonio Gasca, San Sebastián; Attendance: 1,600; Referees: Cindrić, Gonzurek (CRO) |
| 26 January 2025; 18:00 | 1× (yellow card) | Report | 6× (suspension) | Polideportivo Municipal José Antonio Gasca, San Sebastián; Attendance: 1,600; Referees: Cindrić, Gonzurek (CRO) |

| 8 February 2025; 16:00 | **HSG Bensheim-Auerbach (Germany)** | **28–24** | **(France) Paris 92** | Untermainhalle, Elsenfeld; Attendance: 1,000; Referees: Pavićević, Martinović (MNE) |
| 8 February 2025; 16:00 | Hurst 7 | (16–13) | Sagna 6 | Untermainhalle, Elsenfeld; Attendance: 1,000; Referees: Pavićević, Martinović (MNE) |
| 8 February 2025; 16:00 | 2× (suspension) | Report | 7× (suspension) | Untermainhalle, Elsenfeld; Attendance: 1,000; Referees: Pavićević, Martinović (MNE) |

| 9 February 2025; 18:00 | **Fredrikstad BK (Norway)** | **33–24** | **(Spain) Super Amara Bera Bera** | Kongstenhallen, Fredrikstad; Attendance: 784; Referees: Pîrvu, Potîrniche (ROU) |
| 9 February 2025; 18:00 | Jørgensen 9 | (18–10) | Karsten 9 | Kongstenhallen, Fredrikstad; Attendance: 784; Referees: Pîrvu, Potîrniche (ROU) |
| 9 February 2025; 18:00 | 4× (suspension) 1× (red card) | Report | 2× (suspension) | Kongstenhallen, Fredrikstad; Attendance: 784; Referees: Pîrvu, Potîrniche (ROU) |

| 16 February 2025; 14:00 | **HSG Bensheim-Auerbach (Germany)** | **32–30** | **(Norway) Fredrikstad BK** | Untermainhalle, Elsenfeld; Attendance: 507; Referees: Rauchs, Linster (LUX) |
| 16 February 2025; 14:00 | Engel 9 | (19–16) | Jørgensen 9 | Untermainhalle, Elsenfeld; Attendance: 507; Referees: Rauchs, Linster (LUX) |
| 16 February 2025; 14:00 | 3× (suspension) | Report | 1× (yellow card) 5× (suspension) | Untermainhalle, Elsenfeld; Attendance: 507; Referees: Rauchs, Linster (LUX) |

| 16 February 2025; 16:00 | **Paris 92 (France)** | **27–33** | **(Spain) Super Amara Bera Bera** | Palais des sports Robert-Charpentier, Issy-les-Moulineaux; Attendance: 500; Referees: Sîrbu, Serdiuc (MDA) |
| 16 February 2025; 16:00 | Golvet 8 | (10–17) | Karsten 9 | Palais des sports Robert-Charpentier, Issy-les-Moulineaux; Attendance: 500; Referees: Sîrbu, Serdiuc (MDA) |
| 16 February 2025; 16:00 | 4× (suspension) | Report | 6× (suspension) | Palais des sports Robert-Charpentier, Issy-les-Moulineaux; Attendance: 500; Referees: Sîrbu, Serdiuc (MDA) |

| 22 February 2025; 16:00 | **Fredrikstad BK (Norway)** | **28–29** | **(France) Paris 92** | Kongstenhallen, Fredrikstad; Attendance: 1,274; Referees: Marton, Dáné (HUN) |
| 22 February 2025; 16:00 | Sandtrø 7 | (11–13) | Thobor 5 | Kongstenhallen, Fredrikstad; Attendance: 1,274; Referees: Marton, Dáné (HUN) |
| 22 February 2025; 16:00 | 2× (suspension) | Report | 3× (suspension) | Kongstenhallen, Fredrikstad; Attendance: 1,274; Referees: Marton, Dáné (HUN) |

| 23 February 2025; 18:00 | **Super Amara Bera Bera (Spain)** | **29–31** | **(Germany) HSG Bensheim-Auerbach** | Polideportivo Municipal José Antonio Gasca, San Sebastián; Attendance: 1,912; Referees: Fabryczny, Rawicki (POL) |
| 23 February 2025; 18:00 | Tchaptchet Defo 6 | (15–14) | Kim Irion 10 | Polideportivo Municipal José Antonio Gasca, San Sebastián; Attendance: 1,912; Referees: Fabryczny, Rawicki (POL) |
| 23 February 2025; 18:00 | 1× (yellow card) 2× (suspension) | Report | 3× (suspension) | Polideportivo Municipal José Antonio Gasca, San Sebastián; Attendance: 1,912; Referees: Fabryczny, Rawicki (POL) |
