= 2024–25 Women's EHF European League qualification round =

Handball tournament qualifier

Women's EHF European League qualification round
- 2024–25

Tournament information
- Sport: Handball
- Date: 5 October – 17 November 2024
- Teams: 32 (from 18 countries)

Tournament statistics
- Matches played: 40

The 2024–25 Women's EHF European League qualification round decided the last ten qualifiers for the European League group stage.

== Format ==
In round 2, eighteen teams are separated into nine home and away playoffs. The nine aggregate winners advance to Round 3. In round 3, twenty-four teams are divided into twelve home and away playoffs. The twelve winners on aggregate advance to the group stage.

== Teams ==
Round 3
(Croatia) RK Lokomotiva Zagreb	(Croatia) ŽRK Zrinski Čakovec	(France) Paris 92	(Germany) Thüringer HC
(Germany) Borussia Dortmund	(Germany) TuS Metzingen	(Hungary) DVSC Schaeffler	(Norway) Sola HK
(Norway) Larvik HK	(Poland) KGHM MKS Zagłębie Lubin	(Poland) MKS FunFloor Lublin	(Spain) Atticgo BM Elche
(Switzerland) LC Brühl Handball	(Sweden) IK Sävehof		
Round 2
(Austria) Hypo Niederösterreich	(Czech Republic) DHK Baník Most	(France) JDA Bourgogne Dijon HB	(Germany) HSG Blomberg-Lippe
(Hungary) Vác	(North Macedonia) HC Gjorche Petrov-WHC Skopje	(Netherlands) Cabooter Fortes Venlo	(Norway) Fredrikstad BK
(Poland) KPR Gminy Kobierzyce	(Portugal) SL Benfica	(Romania) SCM Râmnicu Vâlcea	(Serbia) SU ZRK Crvena Zvezda
(Slovakia) HC DAC Dunajská Streda	(Spain) Super Amara Bera Bera	(Sweden) H65 Höörs HK	(Switzerland) GC Amicitia Zürich
(Turkey) Armada Praxis Yalikavakspor	(Turkey) Ankara Yenimahalle BSK		

== Round 2 ==
=== Draw ===
The draw for the qualification round was conducted on 16 July 2024 in Vienna, Austria. The bold text indicates which teams advanced.

Seeding
Seeded	Unseeded
(Serbia) SU ZRK Crvena Zvezda (Czech Republic) **DHK Baník Most** (Turkey) Armada Praxis Yalikavakspor (Austria) Hypo Niederösterreich (Slovakia) HC DAC Dunajská Streda (Netherlands) Cabooter Fortes Venlo (North Macedonia) HC Gjorche Petrov-WHC Skopje (Portugal) SL Benfica (Norway) **Fredrikstad BK**	(Poland) **KPR Gminy Kobierzyce** (Spain) **Super Amara Bera Bera** (Sweden) **H65 Höörs HK** (Switzerland) GC Amicitia Zürich (Turkey) Ankara Yenimahalle BSK (Germany) **HSG Blomberg-Lippe** (Romania) **SCM Râmnicu Vâlcea** (France) **JDA Bourgogne Dijon HB** (Hungary) **Vác**

=== Matches ===
The first legs were played on 5–6 October and the second legs were played on 12–13 October 2024.

Team 1	Agg.	Team 2	1st leg	2nd leg
**H65 Höörs HK** (Sweden)	48–47	(North Macedonia) HC Gjorche Petrov-WHC Skopje	29–21	19–26
SL Benfica (Portugal)	60–62	(Spain) **Super Amara Bera Bera**	28–30	32–32
Ankara Yenimahalle BSK (Turkey)	65–99	(Czech Republic) **DHK Baník Most**	31–55	34–44
Cabooter Fortes Venlo (Netherlands)	46–69	(Hungary) **Vác**	22–37	24–32
**Fredrikstad BK** (Norway)	61–41	(Switzerland) GC Amicitia Zürich	33–21	28–20
**JDA Bourgogne Dijon HB** (France)	70–42	(Austria) Hypo Niederösterreich	42–26	28–16
**HSG Blomberg-Lippe** (Germany)	65–52	(Serbia) SU ZRK Crvena Zvezda	39–24	26–28
**SCM Râmnicu Vâlcea** (Romania)	61–52	(Slovakia) HC DAC Dunajská Streda	28–26	33–26
**KPR Gminy Kobierzyce** (Poland)	63–53	(Turkey) Armada Praxis Yalikavakspor	36–27	27–26

6 October 2024; 16:00	**H65 Höörs HK (Sweden)**	**29–21**	**(North Macedonia) HC Gjorche Petrov-WHC Skopje**	Eslövshallen, Eslöv; Attendance: 370; Referees: Härgin, Makejev (EST)
6 October 2024; 16:00	Nuhanovic 9	(14–11)	Muratovic 8	Eslövshallen, Eslöv; Attendance: 370; Referees: Härgin, Makejev (EST)
6 October 2024; 16:00	1× (yellow card) 5× (suspension)	Report	4× (suspension)	Eslövshallen, Eslöv; Attendance: 370; Referees: Härgin, Makejev (EST)

13 October 2024; 18:00	**HC Gjorche Petrov-WHC Skopje (North Macedonia)**	**26–19**	**(Sweden) H65 Höörs HK**	Jane Sandanski Arena Small hall, Skopje; Attendance: 300; Referees: Aghakishi, Aghakishi (AZE)
13 October 2024; 18:00	Dežic 10	(13–12)	Östblom 5	Jane Sandanski Arena Small hall, Skopje; Attendance: 300; Referees: Aghakishi, Aghakishi (AZE)
13 October 2024; 18:00	1× (yellow card) 3× (suspension)	Report	1× (yellow card) 8× (suspension)	Jane Sandanski Arena Small hall, Skopje; Attendance: 300; Referees: Aghakishi, Aghakishi (AZE)

H65 Höörs HK won 48–47 on aggregate.

6 October 2024; 16:00	**SL Benfica (Portugal)**	**28–30**	**(Spain) Super Amara Bera Bera**	Pavilhão da Luz Nº 2, Lisbon; Attendance: 294; Referees: Andorka, Hucker (HUN)
6 October 2024; 16:00	Rodrigues 8	(13–14)	Arroyo Pimienta 9	Pavilhão da Luz Nº 2, Lisbon; Attendance: 294; Referees: Andorka, Hucker (HUN)
6 October 2024; 16:00	2× (suspension)	Report	3× (suspension)	Pavilhão da Luz Nº 2, Lisbon; Attendance: 294; Referees: Andorka, Hucker (HUN)

12 October 2024; 12:00	**Super Amara Bera Bera (Spain)**	**32–32**	**(Portugal) SL Benfica**	Polideportivo Municipal José Antonio Gasca, San Sebastián; Attendance: 1,500; Referees: Pirvu, Potirniche (ROU)
12 October 2024; 12:00	Álvarez Torrado 7	(16–15)	Rodrigues 6	Polideportivo Municipal José Antonio Gasca, San Sebastián; Attendance: 1,500; Referees: Pirvu, Potirniche (ROU)
12 October 2024; 12:00	4× (suspension) 1× (red card)	Report	1× (yellow card) 5× (suspension) 1× (red card)	Polideportivo Municipal José Antonio Gasca, San Sebastián; Attendance: 1,500; Referees: Pirvu, Potirniche (ROU)

Super Amara Bera Bera won 62–60 on aggregate.

5 October 2024; 18:00	**Ankara Yenimahalle BSK (Turkey)**	**31–55**	**(Czech Republic) DHK Baník Most**	Sportovní hala, Most; Attendance: 600; Referees: Rawicki, Fabryczny (POL)
5 October 2024; 18:00	Uzun 11	(15–23)	Stríšková 8	Sportovní hala, Most; Attendance: 600; Referees: Rawicki, Fabryczny (POL)
5 October 2024; 18:00	4× (suspension)	Report	3× (suspension)	Sportovní hala, Most; Attendance: 600; Referees: Rawicki, Fabryczny (POL)

6 October 2024; 16:00	**DHK Baník Most (Czech Republic)**	**44–34**	**(Turkey) Ankara Yenimahalle BSK**	Sportovní hala, Most; Attendance: 500; Referees: Rawicki, Fabryczny (POL)
6 October 2024; 16:00	Sebestiao Mateus 7	(23–17)	Dogan 8	Sportovní hala, Most; Attendance: 500; Referees: Rawicki, Fabryczny (POL)
6 October 2024; 16:00	6× (suspension)	Report	4× (suspension)	Sportovní hala, Most; Attendance: 500; Referees: Rawicki, Fabryczny (POL)

DHK Baník Most won 99–65 on aggregate.

5 October 2024; 19:00	**Cabooter Fortes Venlo (Netherlands)**	**22–37**	**(Hungary) Vác**	Egberbos, Venlo; Attendance: 200; Referees: Ilieva, Karbeska (MKD)
5 October 2024; 19:00	Grummel 10	(12–24)	Csíkos 11	Egberbos, Venlo; Attendance: 200; Referees: Ilieva, Karbeska (MKD)
5 October 2024; 19:00	1× (yellow card)	Report	1× (yellow card)	Egberbos, Venlo; Attendance: 200; Referees: Ilieva, Karbeska (MKD)

12 October 2024; 16:00	**Vác (Hungary)**	**32–24**	**(Netherlands) Cabooter Fortes Venlo**	Vác Város Sportcsarnoka, Vác; Attendance: 500; Referees: Xhema, Jahja (KOS)
12 October 2024; 16:00	Afentaler 9	(15–13)	Marsman 6	Vác Város Sportcsarnoka, Vác; Attendance: 500; Referees: Xhema, Jahja (KOS)
12 October 2024; 16:00	3× (suspension)	Report	2× (yellow card) 3× (suspension)	Vác Város Sportcsarnoka, Vác; Attendance: 500; Referees: Xhema, Jahja (KOS)

Vác won 69–46 on aggregate.

5 October 2024; 17:00	**Fredrikstad BK (Norway)**	**33–21**	**(Switzerland) GC Amicitia Zürich**	Kongstenhallen, Fredrikstad; Attendance: 501; Referees: Geraets, Geraets (NED)
5 October 2024; 17:00	Dalsveen 9	(17–9)	Aellen 6	Kongstenhallen, Fredrikstad; Attendance: 501; Referees: Geraets, Geraets (NED)
5 October 2024; 17:00	1× (yellow card) 1× (suspension)	Report	1× (suspension)	Kongstenhallen, Fredrikstad; Attendance: 501; Referees: Geraets, Geraets (NED)

6 October 2024; 15:00	**GC Amicitia Zürich (Switzerland)**	**20–28**	**(Norway) Fredrikstad BK**	Kongstenhallen, Fredrikstad; Attendance: 512; Referees: Geraets, Geraets (NED)
6 October 2024; 15:00	Aellen 5	(9–12)	Blystad 5	Kongstenhallen, Fredrikstad; Attendance: 512; Referees: Geraets, Geraets (NED)
6 October 2024; 15:00	1× (suspension)	Report	2× (yellow card)	Kongstenhallen, Fredrikstad; Attendance: 512; Referees: Geraets, Geraets (NED)

Fredrikstad BK won 61–41 on aggregate.

5 October 2024; 20:00	**JDA Bourgogne Dijon HB (France)**	**42–26**	**(Austria) Hypo Niederösterreich**	Palais des Sports JM Geoffroy, Dijon; Attendance: 1,600; Referees: Oyarzun Aylagasm, Zaragueta Ruiz (ESP)
5 October 2024; 20:00	Dury 9	(19–11)	Milovanovic 8	Palais des Sports JM Geoffroy, Dijon; Attendance: 1,600; Referees: Oyarzun Aylagasm, Zaragueta Ruiz (ESP)
5 October 2024; 20:00	1× (yellow card) 1× (suspension)	Report	1× (suspension)	Palais des Sports JM Geoffroy, Dijon; Attendance: 1,600; Referees: Oyarzun Aylagasm, Zaragueta Ruiz (ESP)

12 October 2024; 18:05	**Hypo Niederösterreich (Austria)**	**16–28**	**(France) JDA Bourgogne Dijon HB**	BSFZ Südstadt, Maria Enzersdorf; Attendance: 800; Referees: Puksic, Satler (SLO)
12 October 2024; 18:05	Frey 4	(10–14)	Sivertsen 8	BSFZ Südstadt, Maria Enzersdorf; Attendance: 800; Referees: Puksic, Satler (SLO)
12 October 2024; 18:05	1× (suspension)	Report	1× (yellow card) 2× (suspension)	BSFZ Südstadt, Maria Enzersdorf; Attendance: 800; Referees: Puksic, Satler (SLO)

JDA Bourgogne Dijon HB won 70–42 on aggregate.

5 October 2024; 18:00	**HSG Blomberg-Lippe (Germany)**	**39–24**	**(Serbia) SU ZRK Crvena Zvezda**	Sporthalle an der Ulmenallee, Blomberg; Attendance: 552; Referees: Tzaferopoulos, Bethmann (GRE)
5 October 2024; 18:00	Hauf 8	(22–13)	Majkic 5	Sporthalle an der Ulmenallee, Blomberg; Attendance: 552; Referees: Tzaferopoulos, Bethmann (GRE)
5 October 2024; 18:00	1× (yellow card) 4× (suspension)	Report	1× (yellow card) 2× (suspension)	Sporthalle an der Ulmenallee, Blomberg; Attendance: 552; Referees: Tzaferopoulos, Bethmann (GRE)

12 October 2024; 20:00	**SU ZRK Crvena Zvezda (Serbia)**	**28–26**	**(Germany) HSG Blomberg-Lippe**	Sportski Centar "Vozdovac", Belgrade; Attendance: 600; Referees: Cipov, Klus (SVK)
12 October 2024; 20:00	Stamenic, Velickovic 7	(15–13)	Quist 8	Sportski Centar "Vozdovac", Belgrade; Attendance: 600; Referees: Cipov, Klus (SVK)
12 October 2024; 20:00	2× (yellow card) 3× (suspension)	Report	1× (yellow card) 4× (suspension)	Sportski Centar "Vozdovac", Belgrade; Attendance: 600; Referees: Cipov, Klus (SVK)

HSG Blomberg-Lippe won 65–52 on aggregate.

5 October 2024; 16:00	**SCM Râmnicu Vâlcea (Romania)**	**28–26**	**(Slovakia) HC DAC Dunajská Streda**	Traian Sports Hall, Râmnicu Vâlcea; Attendance: 1,526; Referees: Metalari, Nikolovski (MKD)
5 October 2024; 16:00	Wollik 5	(14–11)	Desortová 7	Traian Sports Hall, Râmnicu Vâlcea; Attendance: 1,526; Referees: Metalari, Nikolovski (MKD)
5 October 2024; 16:00	6× (suspension)	Report	1× (yellow card) 3× (suspension)	Traian Sports Hall, Râmnicu Vâlcea; Attendance: 1,526; Referees: Metalari, Nikolovski (MKD)

13 October 2024; 19:00	**HC DAC Dunajská Streda (Slovakia)**	**26–33**	**(Romania) SCM Râmnicu Vâlcea**	City Sports Hall, Dunajská Streda; Attendance: 410; Referees: Puksic, Satler (SLO)
13 October 2024; 19:00	Desortová 8	(14–15)	Hagman 10	City Sports Hall, Dunajská Streda; Attendance: 410; Referees: Puksic, Satler (SLO)
13 October 2024; 19:00	1× (yellow card) 2× (suspension)	Report	5× (suspension)	City Sports Hall, Dunajská Streda; Attendance: 410; Referees: Puksic, Satler (SLO)

SCM Râmnicu Vâlcea won 61–52 on aggregate.

5 October 2024; 17:00	**KPR Gminy Kobierzyce (Poland)**	**36–27**	**(Turkey) Armada Praxis Yalikavakspor**	Adam Wojcik Sports Hall, Kobierzyce; Attendance: 595; Referees: Mikelic, Paradina (CRO)
5 October 2024; 17:00	Wiertelak 11	(20–15)	Özel 9	Adam Wojcik Sports Hall, Kobierzyce; Attendance: 595; Referees: Mikelic, Paradina (CRO)
5 October 2024; 17:00	1× (yellow card) 4× (suspension)	Report	1× (yellow card) 6× (suspension)	Adam Wojcik Sports Hall, Kobierzyce; Attendance: 595; Referees: Mikelic, Paradina (CRO)

13 October 2024; 16:00	**Armada Praxis Yalikavakspor (Turkey)**	**26–27**	**(Poland) KPR Gminy Kobierzyce**	Binnaz Karakaya Sports Hall, Bodrum; Attendance: 500; Referees: Weber, Weinquin (LUX)
13 October 2024; 16:00	Aydemir 6	(16–12)	Polanska 6	Binnaz Karakaya Sports Hall, Bodrum; Attendance: 500; Referees: Weber, Weinquin (LUX)
13 October 2024; 16:00	3× (suspension)	Report	1× (yellow card) 5× (suspension)	Binnaz Karakaya Sports Hall, Bodrum; Attendance: 500; Referees: Weber, Weinquin (LUX)

KPR Gminy Kobierzyce won 63–53 on aggregate.

== Round 3 ==
=== Draw ===
The draw for the qualification round was conducted on 16 July 2024 in Vienna, Austria. The bold text indicates which teams advanced.

Seeding
Seeded	Unseeded
(Germany) **Thüringer HC** (Germany) TuS Metzingen (Norway) **Sola HK** (France) **Paris 92** (Hungary) **Motherson Mosonmagyaróvár** (Croatia) RK Lokomotiva Zagreb (Poland) **KGHM MKS Zagłębie Lubin** (Germany) **Borussia Dortmund** (Norway) **Larvik HK** (Hungary) DVSC Schaeffler (Croatia) ŽRK Zrinski Čakovec (Poland) MKS FunFloor Lublin	(Spain) **Atticgo BM Elche** (Switzerland) LC Brühl Handball (Sweden) IK Sävehof (Sweden) H65 Höörs HK (Note: Identity not known at the time of the draw.) (Spain) **Super Amara Bera Bera** (Note: Identity not known at the time of the draw.) (Czech Republic) DHK Baník Most (Note: Identity not known at the time of the draw.) (Hungary) Vác (Note: Identity not known at the time of the draw.) (Norway) **Fredrikstad BK** (Note: Identity not known at the time of the draw.) (France) **JDA Bourgogne Dijon HB** (Note: Identity not known at the time of the draw.) (Germany) **HSG Blomberg-Lippe** (Note: Identity not known at the time of the draw.) (Romania) **SCM Râmnicu Vâlcea** (Note: Identity not known at the time of the draw.) (Poland) KPR Gminy Kobierzyce (Note: Identity not known at the time of the draw.)

=== Matches ===
The first legs were played on 9–10 November and the second legs were played on 16–17 November 2024.

Team 1	Agg.	Team 2	1st leg	2nd leg
**Thüringer HC** (Germany)	68–51	(Hungary) Vác	34–22	34–29
**Larvik HK** (Norway)	73–72	(Poland) KPR Gminy Kobierzyce	30–29	43–43 PS
IK Sävehof (Sweden)	53–55	(Poland) **KGHM MKS Zagłębie Lubin**	30–28	23–27
RK Lokomotiva Zagreb (Croatia)	49–60	(Spain) **Atticgo BM Elche**	21–28	28–32
**Borussia Dortmund** (Germany)	73–55	(Czech Republic) DHK Baník Most	36–32	37–23
**HSG Blomberg-Lippe** (Germany)	65–48	(Germany) TuS Metzingen	30–21	35–27
**Sola HK** (Norway)	70–55	(Switzerland) LC Brühl Handball	33–23	37–32
**Motherson Mosonmagyaróvár** (Hungary)	(Note: After Motherson Mosonmagyaróvár was given a spot in the group stage, this tie was cancelled and both teams advanced to the group stage.)	(Norway) **Fredrikstad BK**	–	–
MKS FunFloor Lublin (Poland)	43–45	(Spain) **Super Amara Bera Bera**	23–19	20–26
H65 Höörs HK (Sweden)	48–63	(France) **Paris 92**	25–30	23–33
**SCM Râmnicu Vâlcea** (Romania)	64–59	(Hungary) DVSC Schaeffler	33–31	31–28
**JDA Bourgogne Dijon HB** (France)	69–29	(Croatia) ŽRK Zrinski Čakovec	43–12	26–17

10 November 2024; 15:00	**Thüringer HC (Germany)**	**34–22**	**(Hungary) Vác**	Wiedigsburghalle, Nordhausen; Attendance: 901; Referees: Fahner, Kubis (POL)
10 November 2024; 15:00	Hanfland 6	(17–11)	Afentaler 7	Wiedigsburghalle, Nordhausen; Attendance: 901; Referees: Fahner, Kubis (POL)
10 November 2024; 15:00	1× (yellow card) 3× (suspension)	Report	1× (yellow card) 4× (suspension)	Wiedigsburghalle, Nordhausen; Attendance: 901; Referees: Fahner, Kubis (POL)

17 November 2024; 18:00	**Vác (Hungary)**	**29–34**	**(Germany) Thüringer HC**	Vác Város Sportcsarnoka, Vác; Attendance: 600; Referees: Kaludjerovic, Vujacic (MNE)
17 November 2024; 18:00	Csíkos 6	(12–20)	Reichert 11	Vác Város Sportcsarnoka, Vác; Attendance: 600; Referees: Kaludjerovic, Vujacic (MNE)
17 November 2024; 18:00	4× (suspension)	Report	1× (yellow card) 6× (suspension)	Vác Város Sportcsarnoka, Vác; Attendance: 600; Referees: Kaludjerovic, Vujacic (MNE)

Thüringer HC won 68–51 on aggregate.

9 November 2024; 16:00	**Larvik HK (Norway)**	**30–29**	**(Poland) KPR Gminy Kobierzyce**	Jotron Arena Larvik, Larvik; Attendance: 2,280; Referees: Pirvu, Potirniche (ROU)
9 November 2024; 16:00	Sæteren 10	(15–16)	Drazyk 9	Jotron Arena Larvik, Larvik; Attendance: 2,280; Referees: Pirvu, Potirniche (ROU)
9 November 2024; 16:00	2× (suspension)	Report	6× (suspension)	Jotron Arena Larvik, Larvik; Attendance: 2,280; Referees: Pirvu, Potirniche (ROU)

16 November 2024
19:00
KPR Gminy Kobierzyce (Poland)
**43–43**
(Norway) Larvik HK
Adam Wojcik Sports Hall, Kobierzyce
Attendance: 620
Referees: Bocakova, Janosikova (SVK)
Drazyk 15
(20–20)
Sæteren 14
4× (suspension)
Report
1× (yellow card) 3× (suspension)

FT: 39–38 Pen: 4–5

Larvik HK won 73–72 on aggregate.

9 November 2024; 15:00	**IK Sävehof (Sweden)**	**30–28**	**(Poland) KGHM MKS Zagłębie Lubin**	Partille Arena, Gothenburg; Attendance: 925; Referees: Nygaard, Primdahl (DEN)
9 November 2024; 15:00	Kylberg 6	(14–14)	Promis 7	Partille Arena, Gothenburg; Attendance: 925; Referees: Nygaard, Primdahl (DEN)
9 November 2024; 15:00	1× (yellow card) 2× (suspension)	Report	2× (yellow card) 4× (suspension) 1× (red card)	Partille Arena, Gothenburg; Attendance: 925; Referees: Nygaard, Primdahl (DEN)

16 November 2024; 15:00	**KGHM MKS Zagłębie Lubin (Poland)**	**27–23**	**(Sweden) IK Sävehof**	Hala Widowiskowo Sportowa RCS, Lubin; Attendance: 2,204; Referees: Radcenko, Persis (LAT)
16 November 2024; 15:00	Kochaniak-Sala 5	(12–10)	Kylberg, Stankiewicz 5	Hala Widowiskowo Sportowa RCS, Lubin; Attendance: 2,204; Referees: Radcenko, Persis (LAT)
16 November 2024; 15:00	1× (yellow card) 3× (suspension)	Report	3× (suspension)	Hala Widowiskowo Sportowa RCS, Lubin; Attendance: 2,204; Referees: Radcenko, Persis (LAT)

KGHM MKS Zagłębie Lubin won 55–53 on aggregate.

9 November 2024; 16:00	**RK Lokomotiva Zagreb (Croatia)**	**21–28**	**(Spain) Atticgo BM Elche**	Tresnjevka Sports Hall, Zagreb; Attendance: 480; Referees: Cipov, Klus (SVK)
9 November 2024; 16:00	Lukšic, Trúnková 5	(10–11)	Claudino Figueiredo 8	Tresnjevka Sports Hall, Zagreb; Attendance: 480; Referees: Cipov, Klus (SVK)
9 November 2024; 16:00	7× (suspension)	Report	1× (yellow card) 5× (suspension)	Tresnjevka Sports Hall, Zagreb; Attendance: 480; Referees: Cipov, Klus (SVK)

16 November 2024; 19:00	**Atticgo BM Elche (Spain)**	**32–28**	**(Croatia) RK Lokomotiva Zagreb**	Pabellón Esperanza Lag, Elche; Attendance: 1,100; Referees: Härgin, Makejev (EST)
16 November 2024; 19:00	Claudino Figueiredo 6	(18–14)	Sedloska, Trúnková 5	Pabellón Esperanza Lag, Elche; Attendance: 1,100; Referees: Härgin, Makejev (EST)
16 November 2024; 19:00	4× (suspension)	Report	5× (suspension)	Pabellón Esperanza Lag, Elche; Attendance: 1,100; Referees: Härgin, Makejev (EST)

Atticgo BM Elche won 60–49 on aggregate.

10 November 2024; 14:00	**Borussia Dortmund (Germany)**	**36–32**	**(Czech Republic) DHK Baník Most**	Helmut Körnig Halle, Dortmund; Attendance: 635; Referees: Geraets, Geraets (NED)
10 November 2024; 14:00	Antl, Bleckmann 7	(18–14)	Smetková 7	Helmut Körnig Halle, Dortmund; Attendance: 635; Referees: Geraets, Geraets (NED)
10 November 2024; 14:00	1× (yellow card)	Report	1× (yellow card)	Helmut Körnig Halle, Dortmund; Attendance: 635; Referees: Geraets, Geraets (NED)

17 November 2024; 17:00	**DHK Baník Most (Czech Republic)**	**23–37**	**(Germany) Borussia Dortmund**	Sportovní hala, Most; Attendance: 1,250; Referees: Jakovljevic, Sando Kovacevic (SRB)
17 November 2024; 17:00	Zachova 7	(8–16)	Langer 7	Sportovní hala, Most; Attendance: 1,250; Referees: Jakovljevic, Sando Kovacevic (SRB)
17 November 2024; 17:00	1× (yellow card) 2× (suspension)	Report	1× (yellow card) 4× (suspension)	Sportovní hala, Most; Attendance: 1,250; Referees: Jakovljevic, Sando Kovacevic (SRB)

Borussia Dortmund won 73–55 on aggregate.

10 November 2024; 16:00	**HSG Blomberg-Lippe (Germany)**	**30–21**	**(Germany) TuS Metzingen**	Sporthalle an der Ulmenallee, Blomberg; Attendance: 477; Referees: Fremstad, Jorstad (NOR)
10 November 2024; 16:00	Rüffieux 9	(14–9)	Klein, Oßwald 5	Sporthalle an der Ulmenallee, Blomberg; Attendance: 477; Referees: Fremstad, Jorstad (NOR)
10 November 2024; 16:00	2× (suspension)	Report	1× (suspension)	Sporthalle an der Ulmenallee, Blomberg; Attendance: 477; Referees: Fremstad, Jorstad (NOR)

16 November 2024; 19:30	**TuS Metzingen (Germany)**	**27–35**	**(Germany) HSG Blomberg-Lippe**	Öschhalle, Metzingen; Attendance: 320; Referees: Pagh, Thygesen (DEN)
16 November 2024; 19:30	Scheib, Oßwald 6	(7–20)	Kühne, Vegue I Pena 6	Öschhalle, Metzingen; Attendance: 320; Referees: Pagh, Thygesen (DEN)
16 November 2024; 19:30	1× (yellow card) 1× (suspension)	Report	1× (yellow card) 4× (suspension)	Öschhalle, Metzingen; Attendance: 320; Referees: Pagh, Thygesen (DEN)

HSG Blomberg-Lippe won 65–48 on aggregate.

9 November 2024; 15:00	**Sola HK (Norway)**	**33–23**	**(Switzerland) LC Brühl Handball**	Åsenhallen, Sola; Attendance: 445; Referees: Rauchs, Linster (LUX)
9 November 2024; 15:00	Herrem 10	(15–12)	Wolff 6	Åsenhallen, Sola; Attendance: 445; Referees: Rauchs, Linster (LUX)
9 November 2024; 15:00	3× (suspension)	Report	1× (yellow card) 4× (suspension)	Åsenhallen, Sola; Attendance: 445; Referees: Rauchs, Linster (LUX)

10 November 2024; 18:00	**LC Brühl Handball (Switzerland)**	**32–37**	**(Norway) Sola HK**	Åsenhallen, Sola; Attendance: 425; Referees: Rauchs, Linster (LUX)
10 November 2024; 18:00	Wolff 8	(13–15)	Herrem 8	Åsenhallen, Sola; Attendance: 425; Referees: Rauchs, Linster (LUX)
10 November 2024; 18:00	2× (suspension)	Report	1× (yellow card) 2× (suspension)	Åsenhallen, Sola; Attendance: 425; Referees: Rauchs, Linster (LUX)

Sola HK won 70–55 on aggregate.

**Motherson Mosonmagyaróvár (Hungary)**	–	**(Norway) Fredrikstad BK**
	(–)

**Fredrikstad BK (Norway)**	–	**(Hungary) Motherson Mosonmagyaróvár**
	(–)

After Motherson Mosonmagyaróvár automatically reached the group stage, this tie was cancelled and both teams advanced.

10 November 2024; 18:00	**MKS FunFloor Lublin (Poland)**	**23–19**	**(Spain) Super Amara Bera Bera**	Globus Hall, Lublin; Attendance: 2,359; Referees: Novikov (UKR), Gatelis (LTU)
10 November 2024; 18:00	Rosiak, Szynkaruk 4	(11–12)	Arroyo Pimienta 5	Globus Hall, Lublin; Attendance: 2,359; Referees: Novikov (UKR), Gatelis (LTU)
10 November 2024; 18:00	2× (yellow card) 2× (suspension)	Report	4× (suspension)	Globus Hall, Lublin; Attendance: 2,359; Referees: Novikov (UKR), Gatelis (LTU)

17 November 2024; 12:00	**Super Amara Bera Bera (Spain)**	**26–20**	**(Poland) MKS FunFloor Lublin**	Polideportivo Municipal José Antonio Gasca, San Sebastián; Attendance: 1,800; Referees: Ilieva, Karbeska (MKD)
17 November 2024; 12:00	Arrojeria Arantzazistroke 8	(14–9)	Balsam 5	Polideportivo Municipal José Antonio Gasca, San Sebastián; Attendance: 1,800; Referees: Ilieva, Karbeska (MKD)
17 November 2024; 12:00	1× (yellow card) 3× (suspension)	Report	1× (yellow card) 2× (suspension)	Polideportivo Municipal José Antonio Gasca, San Sebastián; Attendance: 1,800; Referees: Ilieva, Karbeska (MKD)

Super Amara Bera Bera won 45–43 on aggregate.

10 November 2024; 18:00	**H65 Höörs HK (Sweden)**	**25–30**	**(France) Paris 92**	Eslövshallen, Eslöv; Attendance: 197; Referees: Nygaard, Primdahl (DEN)
10 November 2024; 18:00	Östblom 7	(14–17)	Kanouté 8	Eslövshallen, Eslöv; Attendance: 197; Referees: Nygaard, Primdahl (DEN)
10 November 2024; 18:00	1× (yellow card) 3× (suspension)	Report	6× (suspension)	Eslövshallen, Eslöv; Attendance: 197; Referees: Nygaard, Primdahl (DEN)

17 November 2024; 17:00	**Paris 92 (France)**	**33–23**	**(Sweden) H65 Höörs HK**	Palais des sports Robert Charpentier, Paris; Attendance: 900; Referees: Cernavskis, Bogdanovs (LAT)
17 November 2024; 17:00	Pina, Prouvensier 5	(16–8)	Shoai Hallberg 5	Palais des sports Robert Charpentier, Paris; Attendance: 900; Referees: Cernavskis, Bogdanovs (LAT)
17 November 2024; 17:00	1× (yellow card) 2× (suspension)	Report	2× (suspension)	Palais des sports Robert Charpentier, Paris; Attendance: 900; Referees: Cernavskis, Bogdanovs (LAT)

Paris 92 won 63–48 on aggregate.

10 November 2024; 17:00	**SCM Râmnicu Vâlcea (Romania)**	**33–31**	**(Hungary) DVSC Schaeffler**	Traian Sports Hall, Râmnicu Vâlcea; Attendance: 1,500; Referees: Bocakova, Janosikova (SVK)
10 November 2024; 17:00	Hagman 6	(20–15)	Sercien-Ugolin 8	Traian Sports Hall, Râmnicu Vâlcea; Attendance: 1,500; Referees: Bocakova, Janosikova (SVK)
10 November 2024; 17:00	1× (yellow card) 4× (suspension)	Report	2× (yellow card) 2× (suspension)	Traian Sports Hall, Râmnicu Vâlcea; Attendance: 1,500; Referees: Bocakova, Janosikova (SVK)

17 November 2024; 18:00	**DVSC Schaeffler (Hungary)**	**28–31**	**(Romania) SCM Râmnicu Vâlcea**	Hódos Imre Sportcsarnok, Debrecen; Attendance: 2,000; Referees: Lidacka, Lesiak (POL)
17 November 2024; 18:00	Sercien-Ugolin 9	(15–15)	Wollik 7	Hódos Imre Sportcsarnok, Debrecen; Attendance: 2,000; Referees: Lidacka, Lesiak (POL)
17 November 2024; 18:00	1× (yellow card) 5× (suspension)	Report	5× (suspension)	Hódos Imre Sportcsarnok, Debrecen; Attendance: 2,000; Referees: Lidacka, Lesiak (POL)

SCM Râmnicu Vâlcea won 64–59 on aggregate.

9 November 2024; 20:00	**JDA Bourgogne Dijon HB (France)**	**43–12**	**(Croatia) ŽRK Zrinski Čakovec**	Palais des Sports JM Geoffroy, Dijon; Attendance: 1,344; Referees: Maia, Nunes (POR)
9 November 2024; 20:00	Gayet 7	(24–9)	Gudelj 4	Palais des Sports JM Geoffroy, Dijon; Attendance: 1,344; Referees: Maia, Nunes (POR)
9 November 2024; 20:00	2× (suspension)	Report		Palais des Sports JM Geoffroy, Dijon; Attendance: 1,344; Referees: Maia, Nunes (POR)

15 November 2024; 19:00	**ŽRK Zrinski Čakovec (Croatia)**	**17–26**	**(France) JDA Bourgogne Dijon HB**	Graditeljska škola Čakovec, Čakovec; Attendance: 800; Referees: Yovchev, Yovchev (BUL)
15 November 2024; 19:00	Posavec 6	(9–12)	Dury, Pintat 4	Graditeljska škola Čakovec, Čakovec; Attendance: 800; Referees: Yovchev, Yovchev (BUL)
15 November 2024; 19:00	1× (suspension)	Report	3× (suspension)	Graditeljska škola Čakovec, Čakovec; Attendance: 800; Referees: Yovchev, Yovchev (BUL)

JDA Bourgogne Dijon HB won 69–29 on aggregate.

== See also ==
- 2024–25 EHF Champions League
- 2024–25 EHF European League
- 2024–25 EHF European Cup
- 2024–25 Women's EHF Champions League
- 2024–25 Women's EHF European League
- 2024–25 Women's EHF European Cup
