= 2024–25 Women's EHF European League =

European handball tournament

Women's EHF European League
- 2024–25
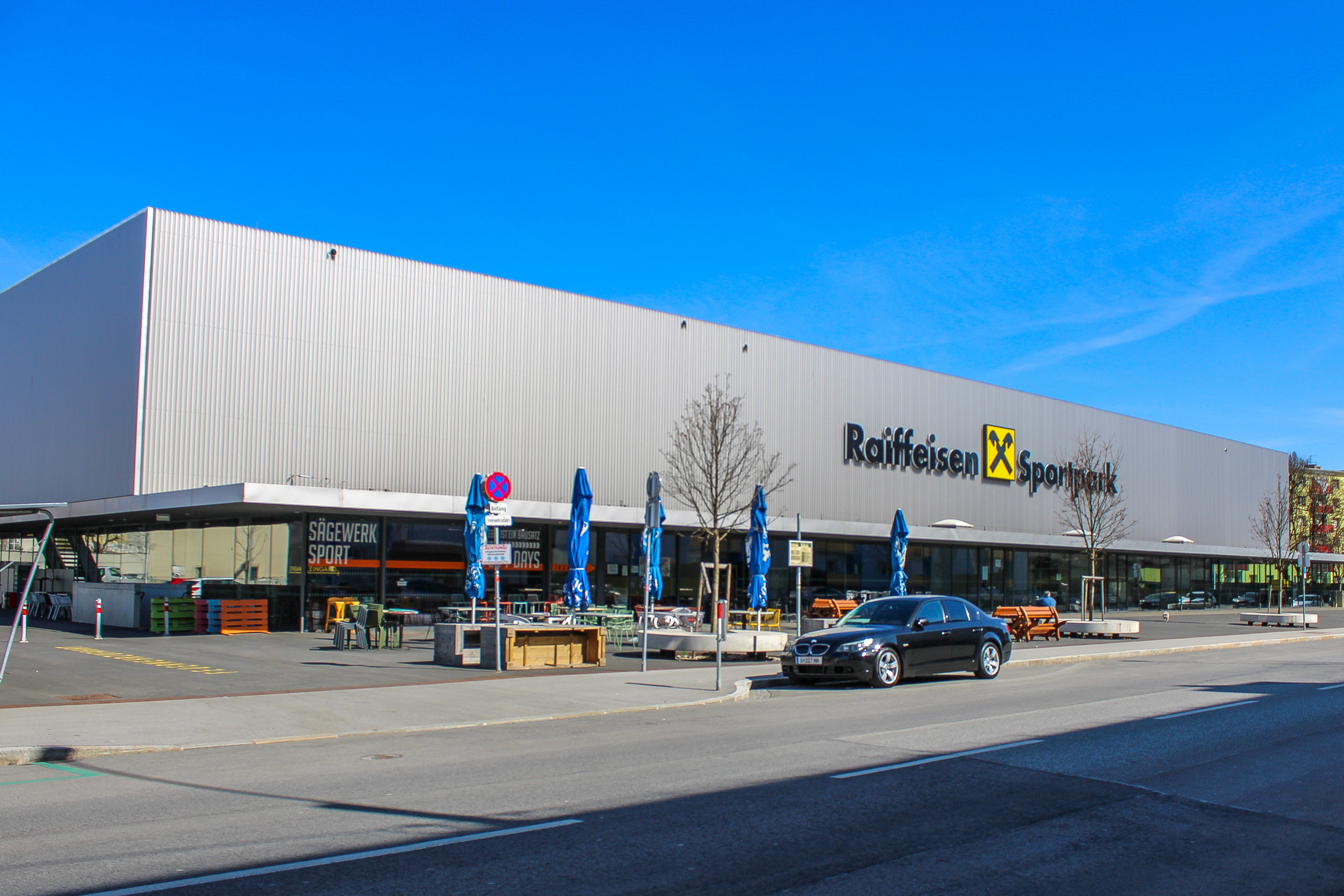
- The final four will be held at the Raiffeisen Sportpark in Graz.

Tournament information
- Sport: Handball
- Dates: 5 October 2024–4 May 2025
- Teams: Competition proper: 16; Total: 37 (from 19 countries)
- Website: ehfel.com

Final positions
- Champions: (Germany) Thüringer HC (1st title)
- Runner-up: (Denmark) Ikast Håndbold

Tournament statistics
- MVP: (Austria) Johanna Reichert
- Top scorer(s): (Austria) Johanna Reichert (110 goals)

The 2024–25 Women's EHF European League is the 44th edition of EHF's second-tier women's handball competition, running from 5 October 2024 to 4 May 2025.

Storhamar Håndball Elite are the defending champions, but they won't be defending their title due to their involvement in this season's Champions League.

Thüringer HC won the title in a dramatic final against Danish side, Ikast Håndbold. The title marks the German club's first European trophy.

== Rankings ==
The rankings are based on the performances of each club from a respective country from a three-year period.

- Associations 1–2 can have four clubs qualify.
- Associations 3–9 can have three clubs qualify.
- Associations 10–18 can have two clubs qualify.
- Associations 19–31 can have one club qualify.
- Associations below the top 31 can't participate in this competition.

Rank	Association	Average points	Teams
1	Denmark	112.00	1
2	Germany	85.67	5
3	France	82.33	3
4	Romania	73.00	2
5	Hungary	67.00	3
6	Norway	50.33	3
7	Russia	44.50	0
8	Poland	28.33	3
9	Croatia	20.33	2
10	Spain	14.00	2
11	Sweden	13.33	2
12	Turkey	12.00	2
13	Czech Republic	6.00	1
14	Switzerland	5.33	2
15	Serbia	5.00	1
16	Austria	1.67	1

Rank	Association	Average points	Teams
17	Slovakia	0.33	1
18	Belarus	0.00	0
19	Ukraine	0.00	0
20	Greece	0.00	0
21	Netherlands	0.00	1
21	Finland	0.00	0
23	Iceland	0.00	0
23	North Macedonia	0.00	1
23	Portugal	0.00	1
26	Luxembourg	0.00	0
27	Azerbaijan	0.00	0
27	Cyprus	0.00	0
27	Israel	0.00	0
27	Italy	0.00	0
27	Kosovo	0.00	0
32	(N/A) Everyone else	0.00	0

== Qualified teams ==
The labels in the parentheses show how each team qualified for the place of its starting round:

- EL: European League title holders
- EC: European Cup title holders
- CW: Cup winners
- CR: Cup runners-up
- 4th, 5th, etc.: League position of the previous season

The list of entered teams was announced on 9 July 2024. Originally, TuS Metzingen entered the Group stage automatically, but this was an error and HSG Bensheim/Auerbach took their place in the group stage instead. On 14 August 2024, Neptunes de Nantes, who had automatically qualified for the group stage, withdrew and as a result, Motherson Mosonmagyaróvár (who would've taken part in Round 3) took their place in the group stage.

=== Team allocation ===
Group stage
(Denmark) Ikast Håndbold (4th)	(Germany) HSG Bensheim/Auerbach (2nd)	(Hungary) Motherson Mosonmagyaróvár (3rd)	(Romania) HC Dunărea Brăila (4th)
Round 3
(Croatia) RK Lokomotiva Zagreb (2nd)	(Croatia) ŽRK Zrinski Čakovec (3rd)	(France) Paris 92 (4th)	(Germany) Thüringer HC (3rd)
(Germany) Borussia Dortmund (4th)	(Germany) TuS Metzingen (5th, CW)	(Hungary) DVSC Schaeffler (4th)	(Norway) Sola HK (3rd)
(Norway) Larvik HK (4th)	(Poland) KGHM MKS Zagłębie Lubin (1st)	(Poland) MKS FunFloor Lublin (3rd)	(Spain) Atticgo BM Elche (2nd)
(Switzerland) LC Brühl Handball (1st)	(Sweden) IK Sävehof (1st)		
Round 2
(Austria) Hypo Niederösterreich (1st)	(Czech Republic) DHK Baník Most (1st)	(France) JDA Bourgogne Dijon HB (5th)	(Germany) HSG Blomberg-Lippe (6th)
(Hungary) Vác (5th)	(North Macedonia) HC Gjorche Petrov-WHC Skopje (1st)	(Netherlands) Cabooter Fortes Venlo (1st)	(Norway) Fredrikstad BK (5th)
(Poland) KPR Gminy Kobierzyce (2nd)	(Portugal) SL Benfica (1st)	(Romania) SCM Râmnicu Vâlcea (5th)	(Serbia) SU ZRK Crvena Zvezda (1st)
(Slovakia) HC DAC Dunajská Streda (1st)	(Spain) Super Amara Bera Bera (1st)	(Sweden) H65 Höörs HK (5th, CR)	(Switzerland) GC Amicitia Zürich (2nd)
(Turkey) Armada Praxis Yalikavakspor (1st)	(Turkey) Ankara Yenimahalle BSK (2nd)		

== Round and draw dates ==
The schedule of the competition was as follows (all draws were held at the EHF headquarters in Vienna, Austria).

Phase	Round	Draw date	First leg	Second leg
Qualification	Second qualifying round	16 July 2024	5/6 October 2024	12/13 October 2024
Qualification	Third qualifying round	16 July 2024	9–10 November 2024	16–17 November 2024
Group stage	Matchday 1	21 November 2024	11–12 January 2025	
Group stage	Matchday 2	21 November 2024	18–19 January 2025	
Group stage	Matchday 3	21 November 2024	25–27 January 2025	
Group stage	Matchday 4	21 November 2024	8–9 February 2025	
Group stage	Matchday 5	21 November 2024	15–16 February 2025	
Group stage	Matchday 6	21 November 2024	22–23 February 2025	
Knockout phase	Quarter-finals	no draw	22–23 March 2025	29–30 March 2025
Knockout phase	Semi finals	TBD	3 May 2024	
Knockout phase	Final	no draw	4 May 2024	

== Qualification round ==
=== Round 2 ===
There were 18 teams participating in round 2. The first legs were played on 5–6 October and the second legs were played on 12–13 October 2024.

Seeding
Seeded	Unseeded
(Serbia) SU ZRK Crvena Zvezda (Czech Republic) DHK Baník Most (Turkey) Armada Praxis Yalikavakspor (Austria) Hypo Niederösterreich (Slovakia) HC DAC Dunajská Streda (Netherlands) Cabooter Fortes Venlo (North Macedonia) HC Gjorche Petrov-WHC Skopje (Portugal) SL Benfica (Norway) Fredrikstad BK	(Poland) KPR Gminy Kobierzyce (Spain) Super Amara Bera Bera (Sweden) H65 Höörs HK (Switzerland) GC Amicitia Zürich (Turkey) Ankara Yenimahalle BSK (Germany) HSG Blomberg-Lippe (Romania) SCM Râmnicu Vâlcea (France) JDA Bourgogne Dijon HB (Hungary) Vác

Team 1	Agg.	Team 2	1st leg	2nd leg
H65 Höörs HK (Sweden)	48–47	(North Macedonia) HC Gjorche Petrov-WHC Skopje	29–21	19–26
SL Benfica (Portugal)	60–62	(Spain) Super Amara Bera Bera	28–30	32–32
Ankara Yenimahalle BSK (Turkey)	65–99	(Czech Republic) DHK Baník Most	31–55	34–44
Cabooter Fortes Venlo (Netherlands)	46–69	(Hungary) Vác	22–37	24–32
Fredrikstad BK (Norway)	61–41	(Switzerland) GC Amicitia Zürich	33–21	28–20
JDA Bourgogne Dijon HB (France)	70–42	(Austria) Hypo Niederösterreich	42–26	28–16
HSG Blomberg-Lippe (Germany)	65–52	(Serbia) SU ZRK Crvena Zvezda	39–24	26–28
SCM Râmnicu Vâlcea (Romania)	61–52	(Slovakia) HC DAC Dunajská Streda	28–26	33–26
KPR Gminy Kobierzyce (Poland)	63–53	(Turkey) Armada Praxis Yalikavakspor	36–27	27–26

=== Round 3 ===
There were 24 teams participating in round 3. The first legs were played on 9–10 November and the second legs were played on 16–17 November 2024.

Seeding
Seeded	Unseeded
(Germany) Thüringer HC (Germany) TuS Metzingen (Norway) Sola HK (France) Paris 92 (Hungary) Motherson Mosonmagyaróvár (Croatia) RK Lokomotiva Zagreb (Poland) KGHM MKS Zagłębie Lubin (Germany) Borussia Dortmund (Norway) Larvik HK (Hungary) DVSC Schaeffler (Croatia) ŽRK Zrinski Čakovec (Poland) MKS FunFloor Lublin	(Spain) Atticgo BM Elche (Switzerland) LC Brühl Handball (Sweden) IK Sävehof (Sweden) H65 Höörs HK (Note: Identity not known at the time of the draw.) (Spain) Super Amara Bera Bera (Note: Identity not known at the time of the draw.) (Czech Republic) DHK Baník Most (Note: Identity not known at the time of the draw.) (Hungary) Vác (Note: Identity not known at the time of the draw.) (Norway) Fredrikstad BK (Note: Identity not known at the time of the draw.) (France) JDA Bourgogne Dijon HB (Note: Identity not known at the time of the draw.) (Germany) HSG Blomberg-Lippe (Note: Identity not known at the time of the draw.) (Romania) SCM Râmnicu Vâlcea (Note: Identity not known at the time of the draw.) (Poland) KPR Gminy Kobierzyce (Note: Identity not known at the time of the draw.)

Team 1	Agg.	Team 2	1st leg	2nd leg
Thüringer HC (Germany)	68–51	(Hungary) Vác	34–22	34–29
Larvik HK (Norway)	73–72	(Poland) KPR Gminy Kobierzyce	30–29	43–43 PS
IK Sävehof (Sweden)	53–55	(Poland) KGHM MKS Zagłębie Lubin	30–28	23–27
RK Lokomotiva Zagreb (Croatia)	49–60	(Spain) Atticgo BM Elche	21–28	28–32
Borussia Dortmund (Germany)	73–55	(Czech Republic) DHK Baník Most	36–32	37–23
HSG Blomberg-Lippe (Germany)	65–48	(Germany) TuS Metzingen	30–21	35–27
Sola HK (Norway)	70–55	(Switzerland) LC Brühl Handball	33–23	37–32
Motherson Mosonmagyaróvár (Hungary)	(Note: After Motherson Mosonmagyaróvár was given a spot in the group stage, this tie was cancelled and both teams advanced to the group stage.)	(Norway) Fredrikstad BK	–	–
MKS FunFloor Lublin (Poland)	43–45	(Spain) Super Amara Bera Bera	23–19	20–26
H65 Höörs HK (Sweden)	48–63	(France) Paris 92	25–30	23–33
SCM Râmnicu Vâlcea (Romania)	64–59	(Hungary) DVSC Schaeffler	33–31	31–28
JDA Bourgogne Dijon HB (France)	69–29	(Croatia) ŽRK Zrinski Čakovec	43–12	26–17

== Group stage ==
Location of teams of the 2024–25 Women's EHF European League group stage.
Red: Group A; Blue: Group B; Yellow: Group C; Green: Group D.

The draw for the group phase was held on 21 November 2024. In each group, teams played against each other in a double round-robin format, with home and away matches.

In the group stage, teams were ranked according to points (2 points for a win, 1 point for a draw, 0 points for a loss). After completion of the group stage, if two or more teams have scored the same number of points, the ranking will be determined as follows:

1. Highest number of points in matches between the teams directly involved;
2. Superior goal difference in matches between the teams directly involved;
3. Highest number of goals scored in matches between the teams directly involved;
4. Superior goal difference in all matches of the group;
5. Highest number of plus goals in all matches of the group;

=== Group A ===
Pos	Team	Pld	W	D	L	GF	GA	GD	Pts	Qualification	DUN	THC	LHK	ELC
1	(Romania) HC Dunărea Brăila	6	4	1	1	179	161	+18	9	Quarterfinals	—	26–22	33–33	33–15
2	(Germany) Thüringer HC	6	4	0	2	183	180	+3	8	Quarterfinals	38–28	—	43–35	27–26
3	(Norway) Larvik HK	6	3	1	2	189	167	+22	7		24–27	38–25	—	30–23
4	(Spain) Atticgo BM Elche	6	0	0	6	136	179	−43	0		29–32	27–28	16–29	—

Source: EHF

=== Group B ===
Pos	Team	Pld	W	D	L	GF	GA	GD	Pts	Qualification	VAL	IKA	DOR	SOL
1	(Romania) SCM Râmnicu Vâlcea	6	4	1	1	194	183	+11	9	Quarterfinals	—	27–26	32–27	32–29
2	(Denmark) Ikast Håndbold	6	4	0	2	185	176	+9	8	Quarterfinals	36–34	—	29–25	35–34
3	(Germany) Borussia Dortmund	6	2	1	3	172	179	−7	5		31–31	30–27	—	29–28
4	(Norway) Sola HK	6	1	0	5	183	196	−13	2		34–38	26–32	32–30	—

Source: EHF

=== Group C ===
Pos	Team	Pld	W	D	L	GF	GA	GD	Pts	Qualification	LIP	DIJ	LUB	MOS
1	(Germany) HSG Blomberg-Lippe	6	5	0	1	184	172	+12	10	Quarterfinals	—	35–30	27–26	33–28
2	(France) JDA Bourgogne Dijon HB	6	3	0	3	190	175	+15	6 (Note: JDA Bourgogne Dijon HB 59–53 KGHM MKS Zagłębie Lubin)	Quarterfinals	27–28	—	27–29	38–29
3	(Poland) KGHM MKS Zagłębie Lubin	6	3	0	3	164	175	−11	6		29–27	24–32	—	31–29
4	(Hungary) Motherson Mosonmagyaróvár	6	1	0	5	181	197	−16	2		32–34	30–36	33–25	—

Source: EHF

=== Group D ===
Pos	Team	Pld	W	D	L	GF	GA	GD	Pts	Qualification	BEN	BER	FBK	P92
1	(Germany) HSG Bensheim-Auerbach	6	6	0	0	189	161	+28	12	Quarterfinals	—	34–32	32–30	28–24
2	(Spain) Super Amara Bera Bera	6	3	0	3	183	179	+4	6	Quarterfinals	29–31	—	32–26	33–28
3	(Norway) Fredrikstad BK	6	2	0	4	173	182	−9	4		28–39	33–24	—	28–29
4	(France) Paris 92	6	1	0	5	152	175	−23	2		18–25	27–33	26–28	—

Source: EHF

== Quarterfinals ==
Team 1	Agg.	Team 2	1st leg	2nd leg
Ikast Håndbold (Denmark)	61–60	(Romania) HC Dunărea Brăila	32–30	29–30
Thüringer HC (Germany)	65–61	(Romania) SCM Râmnicu Vâlcea	35–29	30–32
Super Amara Bera Bera (Spain)	51–52	(Germany) HSG Blomberg-Lippe	25–28	26–24 PS
JDA Bourgogne Dijon HB (France)	59–53	(Germany) HSG Bensheim/Auerbach	31–27	28–26

=== Matches ===
23 March 2025; 14:00	Ikast Håndbold (Denmark)	32–30	(Romania) HC Dunărea Brăila	IBF Arena, Ikast; Attendance: 1,537; Referees: Di Domenico, Fornasier (ITA)
23 March 2025; 14:00	Lindqvist 9	(16–17)	Ježić 8	IBF Arena, Ikast; Attendance: 1,537; Referees: Di Domenico, Fornasier (ITA)
23 March 2025; 14:00	1× (yellow card) 1× (suspension)	Report	1× (yellow card) 3× (suspension)	IBF Arena, Ikast; Attendance: 1,537; Referees: Di Domenico, Fornasier (ITA)

29 March 2025; 19:00	HC Dunărea Brăila (Romania)	30–29	(Denmark) Ikast Håndbold	Romeo Iamandi Sports Hall, Buzău; Attendance: 2,230; Referees: Lindenbaum, Laron (ISR)
29 March 2025; 19:00	González 11	(16–17)	Lindqvist 7	Romeo Iamandi Sports Hall, Buzău; Attendance: 2,230; Referees: Lindenbaum, Laron (ISR)
29 March 2025; 19:00	1× (yellow card) 2× (suspension)	Report	4× (suspension)	Romeo Iamandi Sports Hall, Buzău; Attendance: 2,230; Referees: Lindenbaum, Laron (ISR)

Ikast Håndbold won 61–60 on aggregate

22 March 2025; 16:00	Thüringer HC (Germany)	35–29	(Romania) SCM Râmnicu Vâlcea	Salza Halle, Bad Langensalza; Attendance: 1,200; Referees: Nygaard, Primdahl (DEN)
22 March 2025; 16:00	Reichert 15	(17–15)	three players 5	Salza Halle, Bad Langensalza; Attendance: 1,200; Referees: Nygaard, Primdahl (DEN)
22 March 2025; 16:00	2× (yellow card) 2× (suspension)	Report	3× (suspension)	Salza Halle, Bad Langensalza; Attendance: 1,200; Referees: Nygaard, Primdahl (DEN)

30 March 2025; 15:00	SCM Râmnicu Vâlcea (Romania)	32–30	(Germany) Thüringer HC	Traian Sports Hall, Râmnicu Vâlcea; Attendance: 2,239; Referees: Geraets, Geraets (NED)
30 March 2025; 15:00	Hagman 14	(16–14)	Reichert 11	Traian Sports Hall, Râmnicu Vâlcea; Attendance: 2,239; Referees: Geraets, Geraets (NED)
30 March 2025; 15:00	1× (yellow card) 4× (suspension)	Report	2× (yellow card) 3× (suspension)	Traian Sports Hall, Râmnicu Vâlcea; Attendance: 2,239; Referees: Geraets, Geraets (NED)

Thüringer HC won 65–61 on aggregate

23 March 2025; 18:00	Super Amara Bera Bera (Spain)	25–28	(Germany) HSG Blomberg-Lippe	Polideportivo Municipal José Antonio Gasca, San Sebastián; Attendance: 1,900; Referees: Rauchs, Linster (LUX)
23 March 2025; 18:00	Ogonovszky 6	(12–14)	Vegué 8	Polideportivo Municipal José Antonio Gasca, San Sebastián; Attendance: 1,900; Referees: Rauchs, Linster (LUX)
23 March 2025; 18:00	3× (suspension)	Report	2× (suspension)	Polideportivo Municipal José Antonio Gasca, San Sebastián; Attendance: 1,900; Referees: Rauchs, Linster (LUX)

30 March 2025
16:00
HSG Blomberg-Lippe (Germany)
24–26
(Spain) Super Amara Bera Bera
Phoenix Contact Arena, Lemgo
Attendance: 1,850
Referees: Watson, Welin (SWE)
Kühne 6
(11–10)
Álvarez 7
1× (yellow card) 3× (suspension)
Report
1× (yellow card) 4× (suspension)

FT: 19–22 Pen: 5–4

HSG Blomberg-Lippe won 52–51 on aggregate

23 March 2025; 16:00	JDA Bourgogne Dijon HB (France)	31–27	(Germany) HSG Bensheim/Auerbach	Palais des Sports JM Geoffroy, Dijon; Attendance: 1,900; Referees: Schaad, Müller (SUI)
23 March 2025; 16:00	Vautier 7	(18–13)	Berger, Engel 6	Palais des Sports JM Geoffroy, Dijon; Attendance: 1,900; Referees: Schaad, Müller (SUI)
23 March 2025; 16:00	5× (suspension)	Report	4× (suspension)	Palais des Sports JM Geoffroy, Dijon; Attendance: 1,900; Referees: Schaad, Müller (SUI)

29 March 2025; 16:00	HSG Bensheim/Auerbach (Germany)	26–28	(France) JDA Bourgogne Dijon HB	Untermainhalle, Elsenfeld; Attendance: 1m218 Referees: Vitaku, Vitaku (KOS)
29 March 2025; 16:00	Engel, Irion 6	(12–15)	Dury 6	Untermainhalle, Elsenfeld; Attendance: 1m218 Referees: Vitaku, Vitaku (KOS)
29 March 2025; 16:00	2× (suspension)	Report	4× (suspension)	Untermainhalle, Elsenfeld; Attendance: 1m218 Referees: Vitaku, Vitaku (KOS)

JDA Bourgogne Dijon HB won 59–53 on aggregate

== Final Four ==
The Final Four, (also known as the EHF Finals by the EHF), is held at the Raiffeisen Sportpark in Graz, Austria on 3 and 4 May 2025.

=== Bracket ===
Semifinals
3 May
(Germany) HSG Blomberg-Lippe	18
(Denmark) Ikast Håndbold	28
3 May
(Germany) Thüringer HC	35
(France) JDA Bourgogne Dijon	29

Final
4 May
(Denmark) Ikast Håndbold	32
(Germany) Thüringer HC	34
Third place
4 May
(Germany) HSG Blomberg-Lippe	27
(France) JDA Bourgogne Dijon	32

=== Semifinals ===
3 May 2025; 15:00	HSG Blomberg-Lippe (Germany)	18–28	(Denmark) Ikast Håndbold	Raiffeisen Sportpark, Graz; Attendance: 1,050; Referees: Bocáková, Jánošíková (SVK)
3 May 2025; 15:00	Kühne, Hauf 5	(6–16)	Scaglione 5	Raiffeisen Sportpark, Graz; Attendance: 1,050; Referees: Bocáková, Jánošíková (SVK)
3 May 2025; 15:00	3× (suspension)	Report	1× (yellow card) 3× (suspension)	Raiffeisen Sportpark, Graz; Attendance: 1,050; Referees: Bocáková, Jánošíková (SVK)

3 May 2025; 18:00	Thüringer HC (Germany)	35–29	(France) JDA Bourgogne Dijon	Raiffeisen Sportpark, Graz; Attendance: 1,000; Referees: Murariu, Paraschiv (ROU)
3 May 2025; 18:00	Reichert 16	(21–15)	Vautier 6	Raiffeisen Sportpark, Graz; Attendance: 1,000; Referees: Murariu, Paraschiv (ROU)
3 May 2025; 18:00	6× (suspension)	Report	5× (suspension) 1× (red card)	Raiffeisen Sportpark, Graz; Attendance: 1,000; Referees: Murariu, Paraschiv (ROU)

=== Third place game ===
4 May 2025; 15:00	HSG Blomberg-Lippe (Germany)	27–32	(France) JDA Bourgogne Dijon	Raiffeisen Sportpark, Graz; Attendance: 1,000; Referees: Jakovljević, Kovačević (SRB)
4 May 2025; 15:00	Vegue I Pena 7	(10–16)	Vautier 8	Raiffeisen Sportpark, Graz; Attendance: 1,000; Referees: Jakovljević, Kovačević (SRB)
4 May 2025; 15:00	2× (suspension)	Report	4× (suspension)	Raiffeisen Sportpark, Graz; Attendance: 1,000; Referees: Jakovljević, Kovačević (SRB)

=== Final ===
4 May 2025; 18:00	Ikast Håndbold (Denmark)	32–34	(Germany) Thüringer HC	Raiffeisen Sportpark, Graz; Attendance: 1,400; Referees: Ilieva, Karbeska (MKD)
4 May 2025; 18:00	Bakkerud 8	(16–15)	Reichert 13	Raiffeisen Sportpark, Graz; Attendance: 1,400; Referees: Ilieva, Karbeska (MKD)
4 May 2025; 18:00	1× (yellow card) 1× (suspension) 1× (red card)	Report	1× (yellow card) 3× (suspension)	Raiffeisen Sportpark, Graz; Attendance: 1,400; Referees: Ilieva, Karbeska (MKD)

== Top goalscorers ==
Rank	Player	Club	Goals
1	(Austria) Johanna Reichert	(Germany) Thüringer HC	110
2	(Germany) Nieke Kühne	(Germany) HSG Blomberg-Lippe	71
3	(Norway) Malin Holta	(Norway) Sola HK	59
4	(Germany) Nina Engel	(Germany) HSG Bensheim/Auerbach	53
5	(Argentina) Elke Karsten	(Spain) Super Amara Bera Bera	50
6	(Germany) Laetitia Quist	(Germany) HSG Blomberg-Lippe	48
7	(Sweden) Emma Lindqvist	(Denmark) Ikast Håndbold	47
7	(Norway) Stine Skogrand	(Denmark) Ikast Håndbold	47
9	(Spain) Mireya González	(Romania) HC Dunărea Brăila	46
10	(Sweden) Nathalie Hagman	(Romania) SCM Râmnicu Vâlcea	45
10	(Croatia) Katarina Ježić	(Romania) HC Dunărea Brăila	45

== See also ==
- 2024–25 EHF Champions League
- 2024–25 EHF European League
- 2024–25 EHF European Cup
- 2024–25 Women's EHF Champions League
- 2024–25 Women's EHF European Cup
