= Dounia Abdourahim =

French handball player (born 1992)

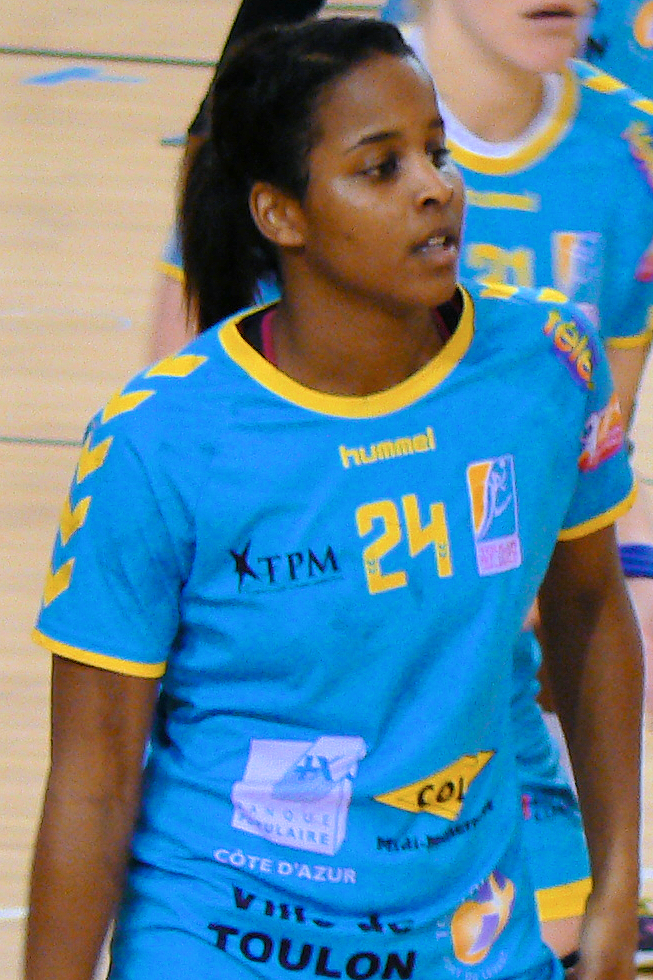
- Abdourahim in 2014

Personal information
- Nationality: French-Senegalese
- Born: 17 January 1992 (age 34) Nîmes, France
- Height: 1.82 m (6 ft 0 in)

Sport
- Sport: Handball
- Position: Left back
- Current club: ASUL Vaulx-en-Velin
- Number: 24

Youth career
- Years: Team
- –: HBC Orange
- –: Mazan VCHB
- –: Apt Handball
- –: Metz Handball
- –: Toulon Saint-Cyr VHB

Senior clubs
- Years: Team
- 2014-2022: Toulon Saint-Cyr VHB
- 2022-2023: Siófok KC
- 2023-2025: Sambre Avesnois HB
- 2025-: ASUL Vaulx-en-Velin
National team
Years	Team	Apps	(Gls)
2013-2014	France	6	(10)
2025	Senegal		
- Updated on December 2025

Dounia Abdourahim (born 17 January 1992) is a French-Senegalese handball player who plays for the Senegal women's national handball team. She plays for the club ASUL Vaulx-en-Velin. She represented France at the 2013 World Women's Handball Championship in Serbia and Senegal at the 2025 World Women's Handball Championship in Germany.
