= Toulon Métropole Var Handball =

French handball club in Toulon

- Full name: Toulon Métropole Var Handball
- Short name: Toulon
- Founded: 2005
- Arena: Palais des Sports de Toulon
- Capacity: 4,200
- President: Jeanne-Marie de Torres Perrine Paul
- Head coach: Rémi Faugères
- League: Championnat de France
- 2025–26: 11th
Home	Away

Toulon Métropole Var Handball is a women's handball club based in Toulon, France. The team is currently competes in the French Women's Handball First League from 2009 and they play their home matches in Palais des Sports de Toulon, Toulon.

== History ==
The club was founded in 2005 as a result of an association (an entente) between "Toulon Var Handball", playing in the elite handball league, and "HOC Saint-Cyr-sur-Mer", the 2005 champion of the second highest level league (Division 2) : "Entente Toulon/Saint-Cyr". Summer 2007, the 2 clubs fully merged to become "Toulon Saint-Cyr Var Handball". The club changed its name to "Toulon Métropole Var Handball" for the 2021/2022 season; they changed their logo too.

== Honours ==
- Championnat de France:
  - Winners (1): 2010
- Coupe de France:
  - Winners (2): 2011, 2012

== Team ==
=== Current squad ===
Squad for the 2026-27 season

Goalkeeper

- 12 (Norway) Tonje Haug Lerstad
- 19 (France) Julianna Munanoa
- 74 (France) Andrea Novellan

LW

- 11 (France) Louise Cavanié
- 97 (France) Euniss Boungo

RW

- 8 (France) Manon Pellerin
- 17 (France) Marie Prouvensier

Line players

- 24 (Denmark) Josefine Dragenberg
- 93 (France) Kyncia Pastour

LB

- 7 (France) Nélya Goval
- 21 (France) Laura Kanor

CB

- 5 (Sweden) Thea Stankiewicz
- 10 (Switzerland) Daphne Gautschi
- 21 (Denmark) Maja Eiberg Jørgensen
- 29 (France) Alycia Sow

RB

- 3 (Germany) Lisa Borutta
- 22 (France) Nora Lelong
- 45 (France) Norah Folituu

=== Transfers ===
Transfers for the 2026-27 season

Joining

- (Norway) Tonje Haug Lerstad (GK) (from (France) ESBF Besançon)
- (France) Andrea Novellan (GK) (from (France) Plan de Cuques)
- (France) Marie Prouvensier (RW) (from (France) Paris 92)
- (Switzerland) Daphne Gautschi (LB) (from (Romania) Ramnicu Valcea)
- (Denmark) Maja Eiberg (LB) (from (Norway) Fredrikstad BK)
- (France) Laura Kanor (LW) (from (France) Brest Bretagne Handball)
- (Germany) Lisa Borutta (RB) (from (Germany) VfL Oldenburg (handball))
- (France) Nélya Goval (LB) (from (France) Metz Handball)

Leaving

- (France) Zazie Samzun (GK) (to (France) Sambre Avesnous Handball)
- (Norway) Mari Finstad Bergum (LB) (retires)
- (Portugal) Beatriz Sousa (RB) (to Handball Plan-de-Cuques)

== Notable former players ==
- (France) Siraba Dembélé Pavlović
- (France) Audrey Deroin
- (France) Marie Paule Gnabouyou
- (France) Alissa Gomis
- (France) Dounia Abdourahim
- (France) Julie Goiorani
- (France) Sophie Herbrecht
- (Ivory Coast) (France) Paula Bredou Gondo
- (Sweden) Kristina Flognman
- (Sweden) Therese Islas Helgesson
- (Democratic Republic of the Congo) Christianne Mwasesa
- (Brazil) Jacqueline Oliveira Santana
- (Brazil) Silvia Araujo Pinheiro
- (Romania) Adina Tuvene
- (Denmark) Stine Svangaard
- (Norway) Vigdis Hårsaker
- (Norway) Malin Holta
- (Norway) Mie Sophie Sando
- (Norway) Elise Skinnehaugen
