= 2023–24 Nemzeti Bajnokság I (women's handball) =

Season of a handball league In Hungary

Nemzeti Bajnokság I
- Season: 2023–24
- Dates: 30 August 2023 – 26 May 2024
- Champion: FTC-Rail Cargo Hungaria; 15th title
- Relegated: NEKA; Kozármisleny
- Champions League: FTC-Rail Cargo Hungaria; Győri Audi ETO KC
- European League: Motherson-Mosonmagyaróvár; DVSC Schaeffler; Praktiker-Vác
- Matches played: 182
- Goals scored: 10,458 (57.46 per match)
- Top goalscorer: Katrin Klujber (188 goals)

The 2023–24 Nemzeti Bajnokság I (known as the K&H női kézilabda liga for sponsorship reasons) was the 73rd season of the Nemzeti Bajnokság I, the top women's handball league in Hungary. A total of fourteen teams contest this season's league, which began on 30 August 2023 and will conclude on 26 May 2024.

FTC-Rail Cargo Hungária won their fifteenth title.

== Teams ==
=== Arenas and locations ===
Location of teams in 2023–24 Nemzeti Bajnokság I
Location of Budapest teams

Team	Location	Arena	Capacity
Alba Fehérvár KC	Székesfehérvár	KÖFÉM Sports Hall	1,000
Békéscsabai Előre NKSE	Békéscsaba	Municipal Sports Hall	2,300
Budaörs Handball	Budaörs	Városi Uszoda és Sportcsarnok	1,000
Debreceni VSC	Debrecen	Hódos Imre Sports Hall; Főnix Hall	2,250; 8,500
Dunaújvárosi Kohász KA	Dunaújváros	Municipal Sports Hall	1,200
Ferencvárosi TC	Budapest (Ferencváros)	Elek Gyula Aréna	1,300
Győri Audi ETO KC	Győr	Audi Aréna	5,500
Kisvárdai KC	Kisvárda	Municipal Sports Hall	1,000
Kozármisleny KA	Kozármisleny	Municipal Sports Hall	800
MTK Budapest	Budapest	Elektromos hall	500
Mosonmagyaróvári KC SE	Mosonmagyaróvár	UFM Aréna	1,100
NEKA	Balatonboglár	NEKA Sportcsarnok	678
Vasas SC	Budapest (Angyalföld)	Sterbinszky Amália Kézilabdacsarnok	600
Váci NKSE	Vác	Municipal Sports Hall	700

==== Number of teams by counties and regions ====
Number of teams by counties
Pos.	County (megye)	No. of teams	Teams
1	Budapest (capital)	3	Ferencvárosi TC and MTK and Vasas SC
2	Fejér	2	Alba Fehérvár KC and Dunaújvárosi Kohász KA
2	Győr-Moson-Sopron	2	Győri ETO KC and Mosonmagyaróvári KC
2	Pest	3	Moyra-Budaörs Handball and Váci NKSE
5	Baranya	1	Kozármisleny KA
5	Békés	1	Békéscsabai Előre NKSE
5	Hajdú-Bihar	1	Debreceni VSC
5	Somogy	1	NEKA
5	Szabolcs-Szatmár-Bereg	1	Kisvárdai KC

Number of teams by regions
Transdanubia	Central Hungary	Great Plain and North
Alba Fehérvár KC; Dunaújvárosi Kohász KA; Győri ETO KC; Kozármisleny KA; Mosonmagyaróvári KC; NEKA	Moyra-Budaörs Handball; Ferencvárosi TC; MTK Budapest; Vasas SC; Váci NKSE	Békéscsabai Előre NKSE; Debreceni VSC; Kisvárdai KC
6 Teams	5 Teams	3 Teams

== League table ==
Pos	Team	Pld	W	D	L	GF	GA	GD	Pts	Qualification or relegation
1	FTC-Rail Cargo Hungaria (C)	26	25	0	1	950	668	+282	50	Qualification for Champions League group stage
2	Győri Audi ETO KC	26	24	0	2	922	611	+311	48	Qualification for Champions League group stage
3	Motherson Mosonmagyaróvári KC	26	22	0	4	933	708	+225	44	Qualification for European League group stage
4	DVSC Schaeffler	26	21	0	5	833	652	+181	42	Qualification for European League third qualifying round
5	Praktiker-Vác	26	14	0	12	718	702	+16	28	Qualification for European League second qualifying round
6	MTK Budapest	26	12	3	11	764	817	−53	27	
7	Moyra-Budaörs Handball	26	12	1	13	712	763	−51	25	
8	Dunaújvárosi Kohász KA	26	10	0	16	689	794	−105	20	
9	Alba Fehérvár KC	26	8	2	16	721	814	−93	18	
10	Kisvárda Master Good SE	26	7	1	18	646	749	−103	15	
11	Vasas SC	26	6	2	18	655	777	−122	14	
12	Tappe-Békéscsabai Előre NKSE	26	6	1	19	667	794	−127	13 (Note: Head-to-head points: Békéscsaba 4, NEKA 0.)	
13	NEKA (R)	26	6	1	19	653	781	−128	13	Relegation to Nemzeti Bajnokság I/B
14	Kozármisleny KA (R)	26	3	1	22	595	828	−233	7	Relegation to Nemzeti Bajnokság I/B

Source: Hungarian Handball Federation (in Hungarian), Flashscore
Rules for classification: 1) Points; 2) Head-to-head points; 3) Goal difference; 4) Head-to-head goal difference; 5) Goals scored; 6) Matches won; 7) Draw (Note: Head-to-head record is used only after all the matches between the teams in question have been played)
(C) Champions; (R) Relegated

== See also ==
- 2023–24 Magyar Kupa
- 2023–24 Nemzeti Bajnokság I/B
- 2023–24 Nemzeti Bajnokság II
