= Tonje Haug Lerstad =

Norwegian handball player (born 1996)

Personal information
- Nationality: Norwegian
- Born: 9 October 1996 (age 30) Trondheim, Norway
- Height: 1.76 m (5 ft 9 in)

Sport
- Sport: Handball
- Position: Goalkeeper
- Current club: ESBF Besançon
- Number: 1

Senior clubs
- Years: Team
- 2012–2018: Byåsen HE
- 2018–2019: Molde Elite
- 2019–2021: Storhamar HE
- 2021–2022: Sola HK
- 2022–2026: ESBF Besançon
- 2026–: Toulon Métropole Var Handball
National team
Years	Team	Apps	(Gls)
2017	Norway	2	(0)

Tonje Haug Lerstad (born 9 October 1996) is a Norwegian handball player who plays for ESBF Besançon.

She is also a part of Norway's national recruit team in handball.

She also represented Norway at the 2016 Women's Junior World Handball Championship, placing 5th, at the 2015 Women's Under-19 European Handball Championship, placing 6th, at the 2014 Women's Youth World Handball Championship, placing 13th and at the 2013 Youth European Championship, placing 7th.

== Achievements ==
- Norwegian League:
  - Silver: 2019/2020, 2020/2021
  - Bronze: 2021/2022
- Norwegian Cup:
  - Finalist: 2019

== Individual awards ==
- All-Star Goalkeeper of the European Women's U-19 Handball Championship: 2015.
