= Maja Eiberg Jørgensen =

Danish handball player (born 2000)

Personal information
- Nationality: Danish
- Born: 21 June 2000 (age 26) Glostrup, Denmark
- Height: 1.78 m (5 ft 10 in)

Sport
- Sport: Handball
- Position: Centre back
- Current club: Toulon Métropole Var Handball
- Number: 21

Youth career
- Years: Team
- 2016–2017: Taastrup IK
- 2017–2019: Ajax København

Senior clubs
- Years: Team
- 2019–2024: Ajax København
- 2024–2026: Fredrikstad BK
- 2026–: Toulon Métropole Var Handball

Maja Eiberg Jørgensen (born 21 June 2000) is a Danish handball player who plays for Toulon Métropole Var Handball.

On 27 February 2026, she signed a one-year contract with Toulon Métropole Var Handball in the LFH Division 1 Féminine. She has previously played for Ajax København and Fredrikstad BK in Norway, where she played for two seasons.

Her father, Lars Eiberg Jørgensen, and mother, Heidi Holm were also professional handball players, and so is her elder sister, Stine Eiberg Jørgensen.
