= Malin Holta =

Norwegian handball player (born 1993)

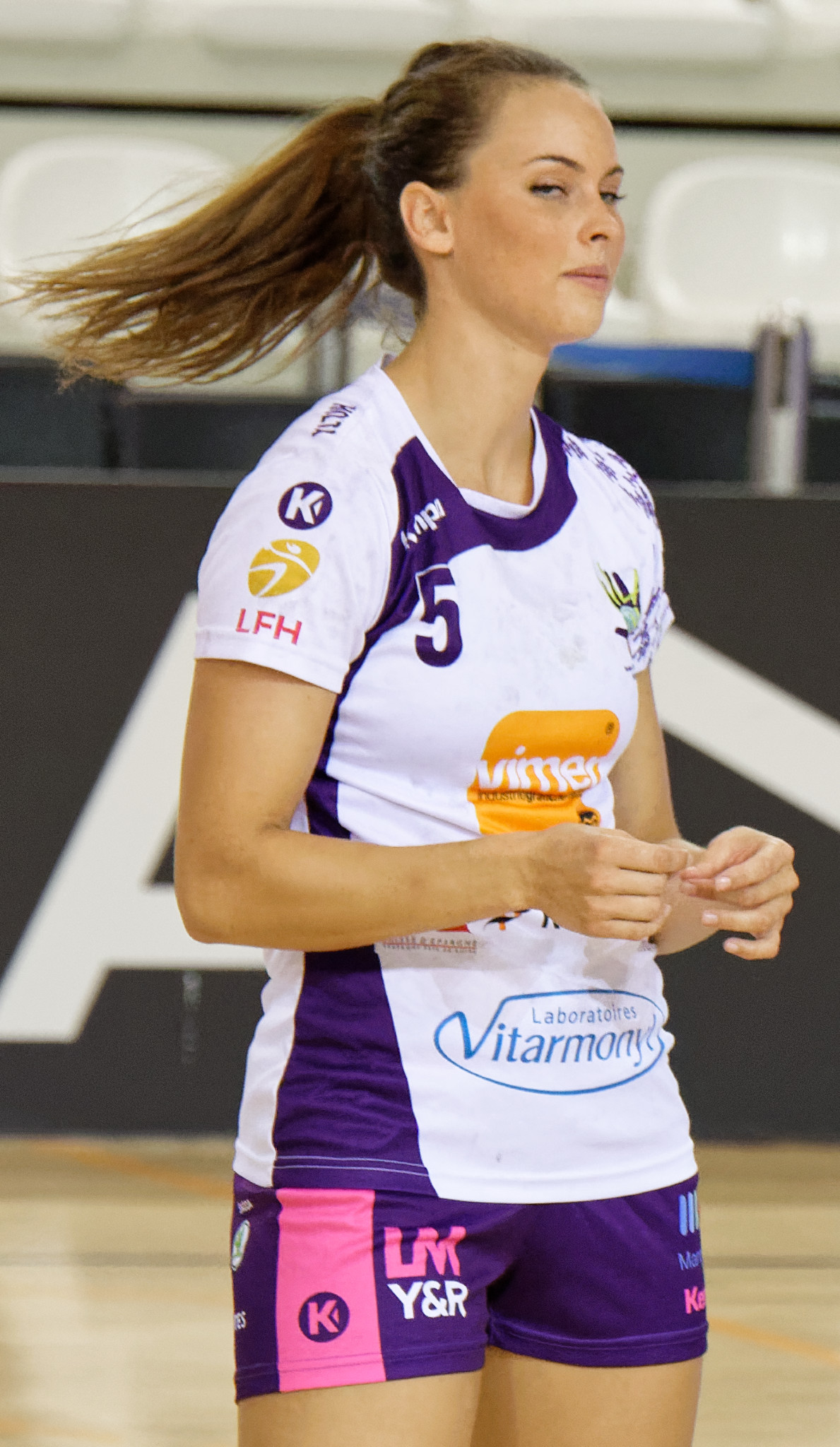

Personal information
- Nationality: Norwegian
- Born: 9 June 1993 (age 33) Stavanger, Norway
- Height: 1.77 m (5 ft 10 in)

Sport
- Sport: Handball
- Position: Centre back
- Current club: Sola HK
- Number: 5

Senior clubs
- Years: Team
- –2009: Randaberg
- 2009–2013: Sola HK
- 2013–2014: Stabæk IF
- 2014–2016: Sola HK
- 2016–2018: Nantes
- 2018–2021: Sola HK
- 2021–2022: Siófok KC
- 2022–2023: Toulon
- 2023–: Sola HK
National team
Years	Team	Apps	(Gls)
2013	Norway	3	(0)

Malin Holta (born 9 June 1993) is a female Norwegian handball player for Sola HK.

She also represented Norway in the 2012 Women's Junior World Handball Championship, placing 8th.

== Achievements ==
- Norwegian League
  - Winner: 2025/26
  - Silver: 2024/2025
  - Bronze: 2020/2021, 2023/2024
- Norwegian Cup:
  - Finalist: 2020

== Individual awards ==
- All-Star Left Back of REMA 1000-ligaen: 2020/2021
- REMA 1000-ligaen: Top scorer 2020/2021 (75 goals)
- Grundigligaen: Top scorer 2015/2016 (129 goals)
