= Anniken Wollik =

Norwegian handball player (born 1997)

Personal information
- Nationality: Norwegian
- Born: 5 December 1997 (age 28) Nannestad, Norway
- Height: 1.66 m (5 ft 5 in)

Sport
- Sport: Handball
- Position: Left wing
- Current club: SCM Râmnicu Vâlcea
- Number: 10

Senior clubs
- Years: Team
- –: Nannestad IL
- –: Skedsmo HK
- 2015–2023: Romerike Ravens
- 2023–2026: SCM Râmnicu Vâlcea
- 2026–: Molde Elite
National team
Years	Team	Apps	(Gls)
2022–	Norway	31	(75)
Medal record
World Championship
Gold medal – first place	2025 Germany/Netherlands
European Championship
Gold medal – first place	2022 Slovenia/North Macedonia/Montenegro

Anniken Wollik (born 5 December 1997) is a Norwegian handball player for SCM Râmnicu Vâlcea and the Norwegian national team.

== National Team ==
At the 2022 European Championship, she won her first gold medal.

At the 2025 World Championship she won her first World Championship gold medal.

== Achievements ==
- World Championship:
  - Winner: 2025
- European Championship:
  - Winner: 2022
