= Nina Engel =

German handball player (born 2003)

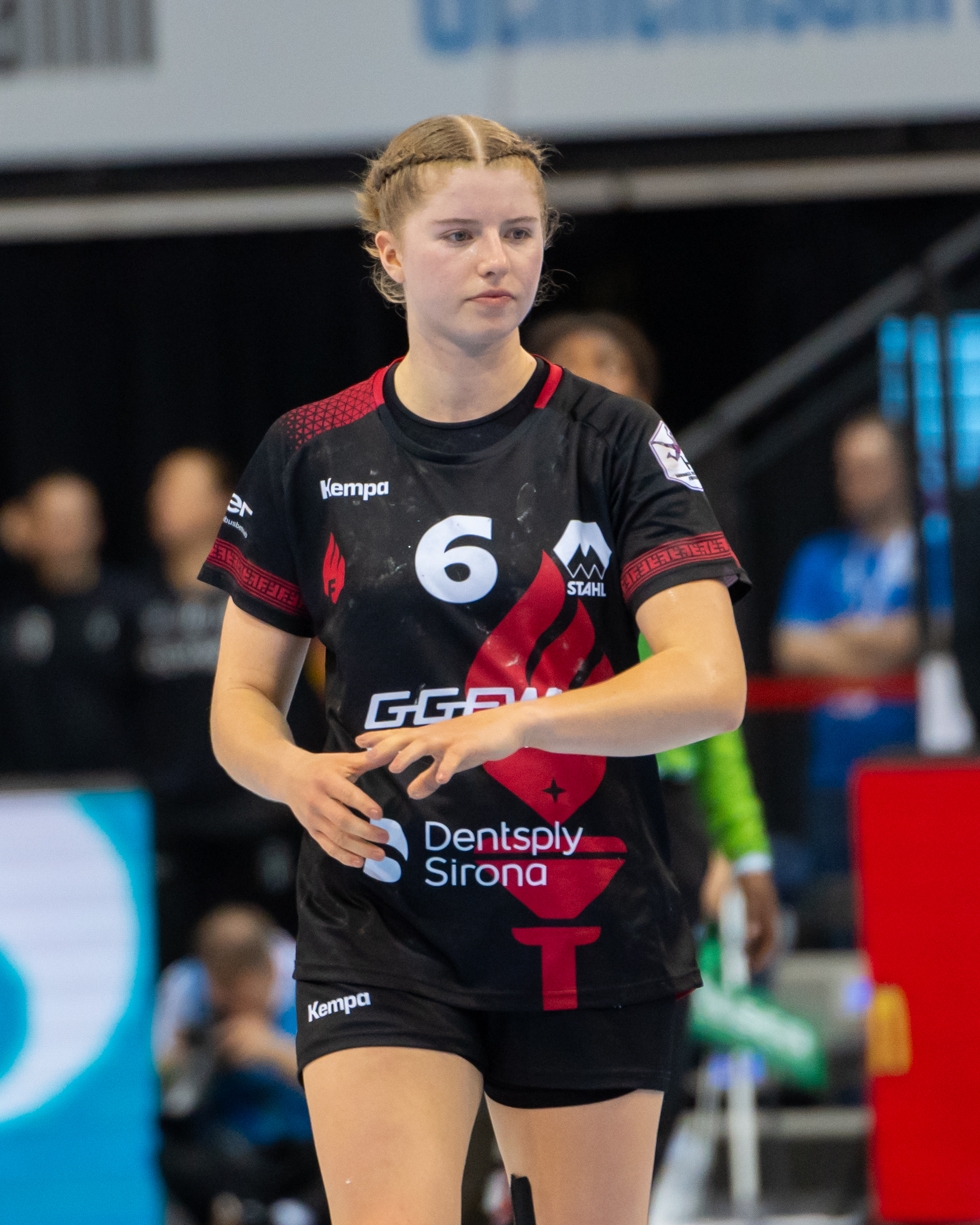

Personal information
- Nationality: German
- Born: 25 April 2003 (age 23) Hildesheim, Germany
- Height: 1.74 m (5 ft 9 in)

Sport
- Sport: Handball
- Position: Right back
- Current club: CS Gloria Bistrița

Senior clubs
- Years: Team
- 2021–2022: SV Werder Bremen
- 2022–2024: Neckarsulmer SU
- 2024–2026: HSG Bensheim/Auerbach
- 2026–: CS Gloria Bistrița
National team
Years	Team	Apps	(Gls)
2024–	Germany	28	(83)
Medal record
World Championship
Silver medal – second place	2025 Netherlands/Germany
- Updated on 7 August 2026

Nina Engel (born 25 April 2003) is a German female handball player for CS Gloria Bistrița and the German national team. She is considered one of today's greatest talents in German women's handball.

She made her international debut on the German national team on 24 October 2024. She also represented Germany at the 2024 European Women's Handball Championship in Switzerland/Austria/Hungary.

A year later she represented Germany at the 2025 World Women's Handball Championship. Here Germany reached the final, where they lost to Norway. This was the first time since 1994 that Germany made the final of a major international tournament and the first time they won a medal since 2007.
