= Johanna Reichert =

Austrian handballer (born 2001)

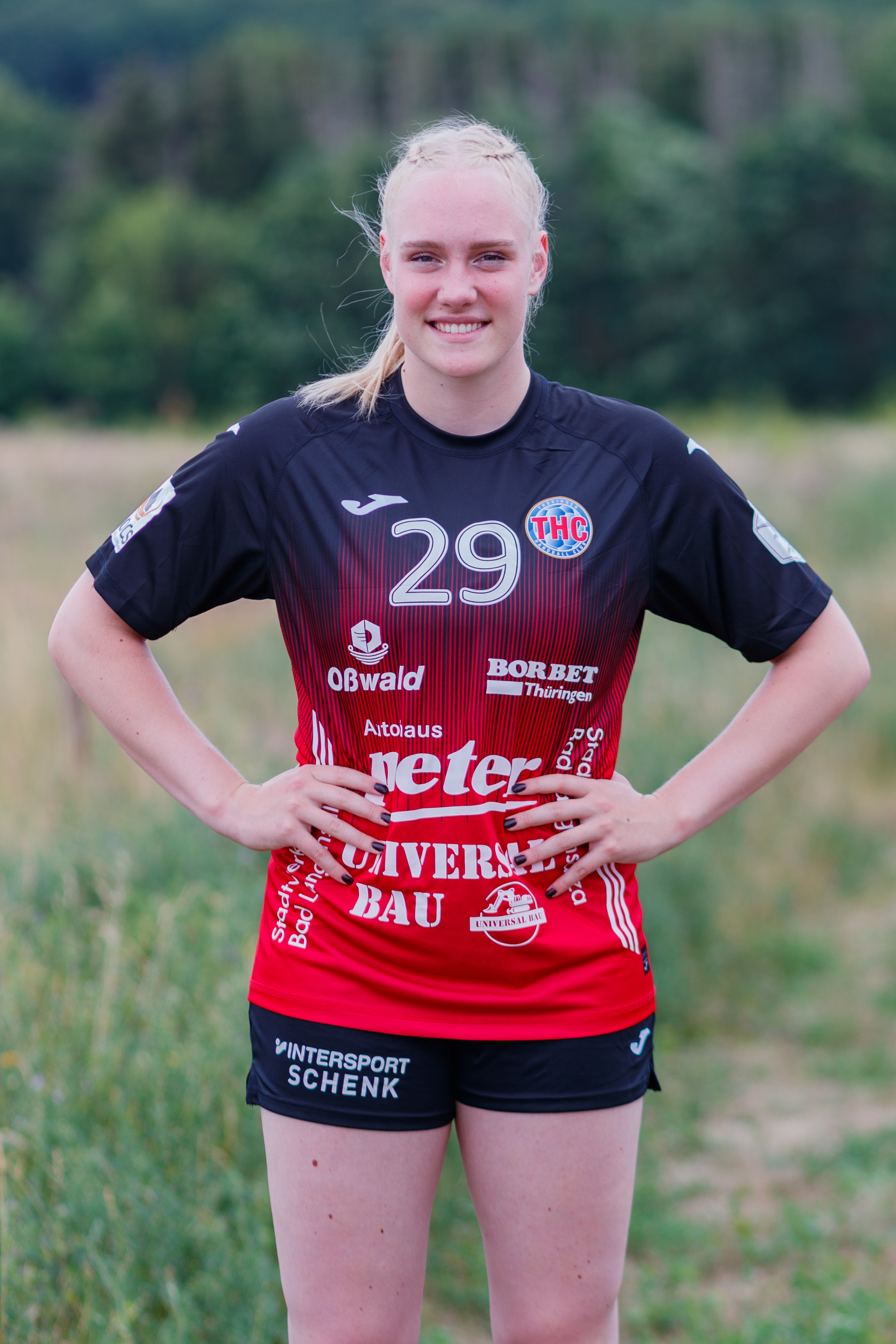

Personal information
- Nationality: Austrian
- Born: 31 December 2001 (age 24) Korneuburg, Austria
- Height: 1.78 m (5 ft 10 in)

Sport
- Sport: Handball
- Position: Left back
- Current club: Gloria Bistrița

Senior clubs
- Years: Team
- 2018–2019: Union Korneuburg
- 2019–2021: WAT Atzgersdorf
- 2021–2026: Thüringer HC
- 2026–: Gloria Bistrița
National team
Years	Team	Apps	(Gls)
2019–	Austria	46	(99)
- Updated on 6 November 2024

Johanna Reichert (born 31 December 2001) is an Austrian handballer for Gloria Bistrița and the Austrian national team.

== International honours ==
- EHF European League:
  - Winner: 2025
  - Finalist: 2026

== Individual awards ==
- MVP of the European League: 2025
- Top Scorer of the European League: 2025, 2026
- MVP of the Handball-Bundesliga: 2025
- Top Scorer of the Handball-Bundesliga: 2025
