= Traian Sports Hall =

Indoor arena in Râmnicu Vâlcea, Romania

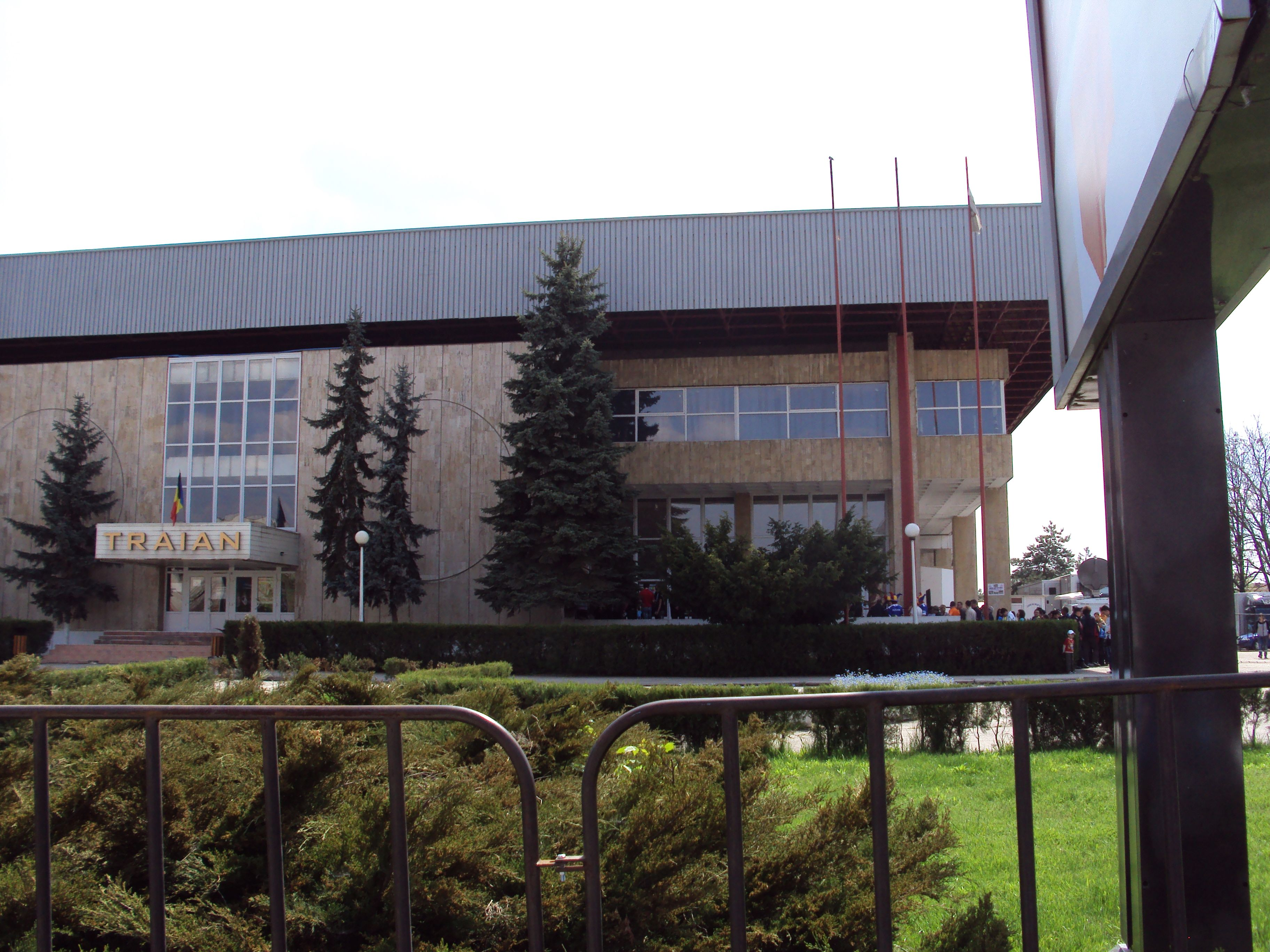
- Traian Sports Hall
- Interactive map of Traian Sports Hall
- Location: Râmnicu Vâlcea, Romania
- Coordinates: 45.107696°N 24.370594°E
- Capacity: 2.375 (handball)

Construction
- Opened: 1982
- Renovated: 2020
- Expanded: 2011

Tenant
- SCM Râmnicu Vâlcea (Liga Națională)

Traian Sports Hall (Romanian: 'Sala Sporturilor Traian') is an indoor arena in Râmnicu Vâlcea, Romania. It is primarily used for handball. The hall was renovated in 2011.
