= Laetitia Quist =

German handball player (born 2001)

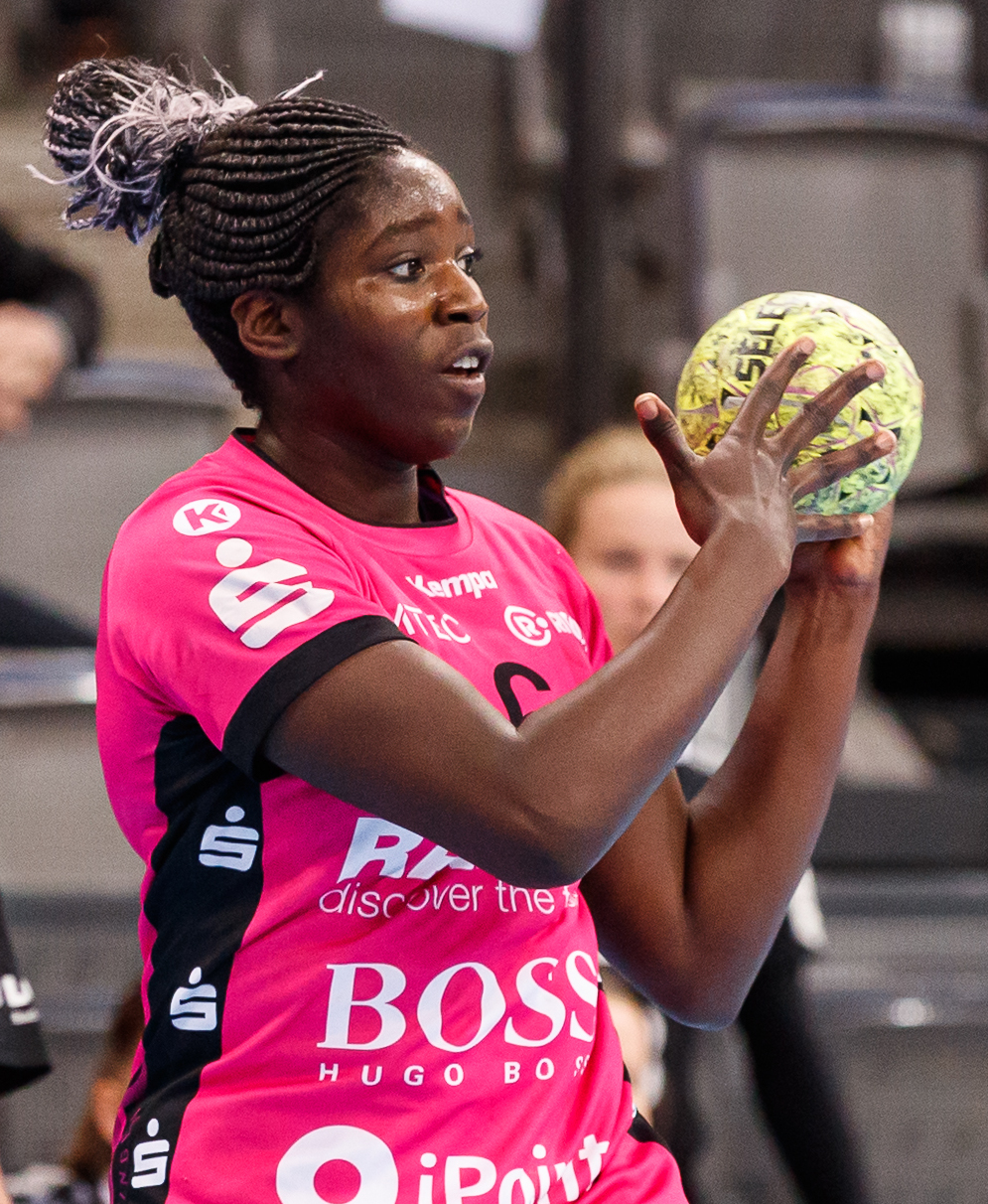

Personal information
- Nationality: German
- Born: 8 November 2001 (age 24) Baden-Baden, Germany
- Height: 1.82 m (6 ft 0 in)

Sport
- Sport: Handball
- Position: Right back
- Current club: Borussia Dortmund
- Number: 6

Youth career
- Years: Team
- –: TV Sandweier
- 2016-2019: SG Kappelwindeck/Steinbach

Senior clubs
- Years: Team
- -2019: SG Kappelwindeck/Steinbach
- 2019-2021: TuS Metzingen
- 2021-2025: HSG Blomberg-Lippe
- 2025-2026: Mosonmagyaróvári KC SE
- 2026–: Borussia Dortmund
National team
Years	Team	Apps	(Gls)
2022–	Germany	5	(2)
- Updated on 12 July 2024

Laetitia Quist (born 8 November 2001) is a German female handball player for Borussia Dortmund in the Frauen-Bundesliga and the German national team.

In September 2018, she was included by EHF in a list of the twenty best young handballers to watch for the future.

== National team ==
She made her debut on the German national team on 21 April 2022, against Greece.

She is part of the German 35-player squad for the 2022 European Women's Handball Championship in North Macedonia/Montenegro/Slovenia.

== Club career ==
Laetitia Quist started playing handball at TV Sandweier. Later she joined SG Kappelwindeck/Steinbach in the 4th tier, and in 2018 she was promoted with the team to the 3. liga. In 2019 she joined TuS Metzingen, where she played partly for the youth team and partly for the first team.

She joined HSG Blomberg-Lippe in 2021 on a four year contract. After her contract at HSG Blomberg-Lippe expired in 2025, she joined Hungarian team Mosonmagyaróvári KC SE.

== Achievements ==
- Handball-Bundesliga Frauen:
  - Bronze: 2019
