= 2025–26 Women's EHF European League group stage =

European handball tournament

Tournament information
- Sport: Handball
- Date: 10 January – 22 February 2026
- Teams: 16 (from 9 countries)
- Website: ehfel.com

The 2025–26 Women's EHF European League group stage was played between 10 January and 22 February 2025 to determine the eight teams advancing to the knockout stage of the 2025–26 Women's EHF European League.

== Draw ==
The draw took place on the 20 November 2025 at 11:00 CET in Vienna, Austria. The only restriction was that clubs from the same country cannot be in the same group. Bold indicates who advanced to the knockout stage.

=== Seeding ===
Pot 1	Pot 2	Pot 3	Pot 4
(Denmark) **Nykøbing Falster Håndboldklub** (Germany) **Thüringer HC** (Norway) **Tertnes Bergen** (Romania) CSM Corona Brașov	(Denmark) **Viborg HK** (Germany) HSG Blomberg-Lippe (Hungary) **Motherson Mosonmagyaróvár** (Romania) **CS Rapid București**	(Croatia) **RK Lokomotiva Zagreb** (France) JDA Bourgogne Dijon HB (Hungary) **MOL Esztergom** (Romania) CS Minaur Baia Mare	(France) Chambray Touraine Handball (Germany) VfL Oldenburg (Norway) Larvik HK (Poland) KGHM MKS Zagłębie Lubin

== Format ==
In each group, teams played against each other in a double round-robin format, with home and away matches.

== Tiebreakers ==
In the group stage, teams were ranked according to points (2 points for a win, 1 point for a draw, 0 points for a loss), and if tied on points, the following tiebreaking criteria were applied, in the order given, to determine the rankings:

1. Points in matches among tied teams;
2. Goal difference in matches among tied teams;
3. Goal difference in all group matches;
4. Goals scored in all group matches;
5. If more than two teams were tied, and after applying all head-to-head criteria above, a subset of teams were still tied, all head-to-head criteria above were reapplied exclusively to this subset of teams;
6. Drawing lots.

== Groups ==
=== Group A ===
Pos	Team	Pld	W	D	L	GF	GA	GD	Pts	Qualification	THÜ	MOS	MIN	LAR
1	(Germany) Thüringer HC	6	4	0	2	195	181	+14	**8 (Note: Thüringer HC 68–60 Motherson Mosonmagyaróvár)**	Quarterfinals	—	34–24	33–32	36–33
2	(Hungary) Motherson Mosonmagyaróvár	6	4	0	2	174	176	−2	**8**	Quarterfinals	36–34	—	28–26	31–22
3	(Romania) CS Minaur Baia Mare	6	3	0	3	176	170	+6	**6**		28–24	34–28	—	28–31
4	(Norway) Larvik HK	6	1	0	5	166	184	−18	**2**		28–34	26–27	26–28	—

Source: EHF
Notes:

10 January 2026; 18:00	**Larvik HK (Norway)**	**26–28**	**(Romania) CS Minaur Baia Mare**	Jotron Arena, Larvik; Attendance: 329; Referees: Kinnari, Skogberg (FIN)
10 January 2026; 18:00	Mørch 7	(13–13)	Woller 9	Jotron Arena, Larvik; Attendance: 329; Referees: Kinnari, Skogberg (FIN)
10 January 2026; 18:00	1× (suspension)	Report	1× (yellow card) 1× (suspension)	Jotron Arena, Larvik; Attendance: 329; Referees: Kinnari, Skogberg (FIN)

11 January 2026; 16:00	**Motherson Mosonmagyaróvár (Hungary)**	**36–34**	**(Germany) Thüringer HC**	UFM Aréna, Mosonmagyaróvár; Attendance: 754; Referees: Lindenbaum, Laron (ISR)
11 January 2026; 16:00	Quist 8	(16–15)	Reichert 16	UFM Aréna, Mosonmagyaróvár; Attendance: 754; Referees: Lindenbaum, Laron (ISR)
11 January 2026; 16:00	1× (yellow card) 4× (suspension)	Report	1× (yellow card) 3× (suspension)	UFM Aréna, Mosonmagyaróvár; Attendance: 754; Referees: Lindenbaum, Laron (ISR)

17 January 2026; 17:00	**CS Minaur Baia Mare (Romania)**	**34–28**	**(Hungary) Motherson Mosonmagyaróvár**	Sala Polivalenta Lascar Pana, Baia Mare; Attendance: 2,200; Referees: Ilievski, Ilievski (MKD)
17 January 2026; 17:00	Spugnini 10	(19–15)	Tomova 7	Sala Polivalenta Lascar Pana, Baia Mare; Attendance: 2,200; Referees: Ilievski, Ilievski (MKD)
17 January 2026; 17:00	1× (yellow card) 2× (suspension)	Report	1× (yellow card) 5× (suspension)	Sala Polivalenta Lascar Pana, Baia Mare; Attendance: 2,200; Referees: Ilievski, Ilievski (MKD)

18 January 2026; 16:00	**Thüringer HC (Germany)**	**36–33**	**(Norway) Larvik HK**	Salza-Halle. Bad Langensalza; Attendance: 1,150; Referees: Cournil, Lamour (FRA)
18 January 2026; 16:00	Reichert 10	(19–16)	Sæteren 7	Salza-Halle. Bad Langensalza; Attendance: 1,150; Referees: Cournil, Lamour (FRA)
18 January 2026; 16:00	2× (suspension)	Report	3× (suspension)	Salza-Halle. Bad Langensalza; Attendance: 1,150; Referees: Cournil, Lamour (FRA)

24 January 2026; 18:00	**Motherson Mosonmagyaróvár (Hungary)**	**31–22**	**(Norway) Larvik HK**	UFM Aréna, Mosonmagyaróvár; Attendance: 671; Referees: Ivanović, Kaluđerović (MNE)
24 January 2026; 18:00	Tóth 8	(17–11)	Ramberg 5	UFM Aréna, Mosonmagyaróvár; Attendance: 671; Referees: Ivanović, Kaluđerović (MNE)
24 January 2026; 18:00	1× (yellow card) 4× (suspension)	Report	1× (yellow card) 2× (suspension) 1× (red card)	UFM Aréna, Mosonmagyaróvár; Attendance: 671; Referees: Ivanović, Kaluđerović (MNE)

24 January 2026; 20:00	**Thüringer HC (Germany)**	**33–32**	**(Romania) CS Minaur Baia Mare**	Salza-Halle. Bad Langensalza; Attendance: 905; Referees: Álvarez, Soria (SPA)
24 January 2026; 20:00	Reichert 14	(15–18)	Ilina 8	Salza-Halle. Bad Langensalza; Attendance: 905; Referees: Álvarez, Soria (SPA)
24 January 2026; 20:00	1× (yellow card) 6× (suspension) 1× (red card)	Report	1× (yellow card) 3× (suspension) 1× (red card)	Salza-Halle. Bad Langensalza; Attendance: 905; Referees: Álvarez, Soria (SPA)

7 February 2026; 17:00	**CS Minaur Baia Mare (Romania)**	**28–24**	**(Germany) Thüringer HC**	Sala Polivalenta Lascar Pana, Baia Mare; Attendance: 2,200; Referees: Fahner, Kubis (POL)
7 February 2026; 17:00	Quintino 8	(13–12)	Reichert 7	Sala Polivalenta Lascar Pana, Baia Mare; Attendance: 2,200; Referees: Fahner, Kubis (POL)
7 February 2026; 17:00	2× (yellow card) 4× (suspension)	Report	2× (yellow card) 6× (suspension)	Sala Polivalenta Lascar Pana, Baia Mare; Attendance: 2,200; Referees: Fahner, Kubis (POL)

8 February 2026; 16:00	**Larvik HK (Norway)**	**26–27**	**(Hungary) Motherson Mosonmagyaróvár**	Jotron Arena, Larvik; Attendance: 229; Referees: Nygaard, Primdahl (DEN)
8 February 2026; 16:00	Sæteren 12	(11–10)	Tóth 7	Jotron Arena, Larvik; Attendance: 229; Referees: Nygaard, Primdahl (DEN)
8 February 2026; 16:00	1× (yellow card) 2× (suspension)	Report	2× (suspension)	Jotron Arena, Larvik; Attendance: 229; Referees: Nygaard, Primdahl (DEN)

14 February 2026; 19:00	**CS Minaur Baia Mare (Romania)**	**28–31**	**(Norway) Larvik HK**	Sala Polivalenta Lascar Pana, Baia Mare; Attendance: 2,200; Referees: Fukala, Mohyla (CZE)
14 February 2026; 19:00	Spugnini 6	(14–17)	Sæteren 10	Sala Polivalenta Lascar Pana, Baia Mare; Attendance: 2,200; Referees: Fukala, Mohyla (CZE)
14 February 2026; 19:00	1× (yellow card) 2× (suspension)	Report	1× (yellow card) 5× (suspension)	Sala Polivalenta Lascar Pana, Baia Mare; Attendance: 2,200; Referees: Fukala, Mohyla (CZE)

15 February 2026; 14:00	**Thüringer HC (Germany)**	**34–24**	**(Hungary) Motherson Mosonmagyaróvár**	Salza-Halle. Bad Langensalza; Attendance: 1,200; Referees: Brodić, Hodžić (CRO)
15 February 2026; 14:00	Reichert 14	(15–12)	Tóth 6	Salza-Halle. Bad Langensalza; Attendance: 1,200; Referees: Brodić, Hodžić (CRO)
15 February 2026; 14:00	2× (yellow card) 2× (suspension)	Report	1× (yellow card) 2× (suspension)	Salza-Halle. Bad Langensalza; Attendance: 1,200; Referees: Brodić, Hodžić (CRO)

21 February 2026; 16:00	**Larvik HK (Norway)**	**28–34**	**(Germany) Thüringer HC**	Jotron Arena, Larvik; Attendance: 312; Referees: Radčenko, Pērsis (LAT)
21 February 2026; 16:00	Sæteren 6	(17–17)	Reichert 10	Jotron Arena, Larvik; Attendance: 312; Referees: Radčenko, Pērsis (LAT)
21 February 2026; 16:00	1× (yellow card) 1× (suspension)	Report	1× (yellow card) 3× (suspension)	Jotron Arena, Larvik; Attendance: 312; Referees: Radčenko, Pērsis (LAT)

21 February 2026; 16:00	**Motherson Mosonmagyaróvár (Hungary)**	**28–26**	**(Romania) CS Minaur Baia Mare**	UFM Aréna, Mosonmagyaróvár; Attendance: 731; Referees: Geraets, Geraets (NED)
21 February 2026; 16:00	Kukely 5	(13–10)	Lundbäck, Spugnini 7	UFM Aréna, Mosonmagyaróvár; Attendance: 731; Referees: Geraets, Geraets (NED)
21 February 2026; 16:00	1× (yellow card) 3× (suspension)	Report	1× (suspension)	UFM Aréna, Mosonmagyaróvár; Attendance: 731; Referees: Geraets, Geraets (NED)

=== Group B ===
Pos	Team	Pld	W	D	L	GF	GA	GD	Pts	Qualification	ESZ	NYK	BLO	CHA
1	(Hungary) MOL Esztergom	6	4	1	1	181	174	+7	**9**	Quarterfinals	—	30–25	33–32	24–22
2	(Denmark) Nykøbing Falster Håndboldklub	6	2	3	1	167	163	+4	**7**	Quarterfinals	34–32	—	30–30	21–21
3	(Germany) HSG Blomberg-Lippe	6	1	2	3	171	176	−5	**4 (Note: HSG Blomberg-Lippe 56–53 Chambray Touraine Handball)**		31–31	22–29	—	25–26
4	(France) Chambray Touraine Handball	6	1	2	3	154	160	−6	**4**		30–31	28–28	27–31	—

Source: EHF
Notes:

11 January 2026; 16:00	**HSG Blomberg-Lippe (Germany)**	**25–26**	**(France) Chambray Touraine Handball**	Phoenix Contact-Arena, Lemgo; Attendance: 1,108; Referees: Uhlíř, Beňuš (CZE)
11 January 2026; 16:00	Kühne 8	(11–14)	Stoiljković 6	Phoenix Contact-Arena, Lemgo; Attendance: 1,108; Referees: Uhlíř, Beňuš (CZE)
11 January 2026; 16:00	2× (suspension)	Report	4× (suspension)	Phoenix Contact-Arena, Lemgo; Attendance: 1,108; Referees: Uhlíř, Beňuš (CZE)

11 January 2026; 18:00	**Nykøbing Falster Håndboldklub (Denmark)**	**34–32**	**(Hungary) MOL Esztergom**	SPAR NORD Boxen, Nykøbing Falster; Attendance: 1,568; Referees: Bogdanovs, Čerņavskis (LAT)
11 January 2026; 18:00	Lerby, Magnussen 8	(17–16)	Varga 7	SPAR NORD Boxen, Nykøbing Falster; Attendance: 1,568; Referees: Bogdanovs, Čerņavskis (LAT)
11 January 2026; 18:00	2× (yellow card) 1× (suspension)	Report	2× (yellow card) 5× (suspension)	SPAR NORD Boxen, Nykøbing Falster; Attendance: 1,568; Referees: Bogdanovs, Čerņavskis (LAT)

17 January 2026; 20:00	**MOL Esztergom (Hungary)**	**33–32**	**(Germany) HSG Blomberg-Lippe**	Suzuki Aréna, Esztergom; Attendance: 900; Referees: Brodić, Hodžić (CRO)
17 January 2026; 20:00	Faragó, Horváth 8	(18–16)	Kühne 7	Suzuki Aréna, Esztergom; Attendance: 900; Referees: Brodić, Hodžić (CRO)
17 January 2026; 20:00	2× (yellow card) 5× (suspension)	Report	1× (yellow card) 3× (suspension)	Suzuki Aréna, Esztergom; Attendance: 900; Referees: Brodić, Hodžić (CRO)

18 January 2026; 18:00	**Chambray Touraine Handball (France)**	**28–28**	**(Denmark) Nykøbing Falster Håndboldklub**	La Fontaine Blanche, Chambray-lès-Tours; Attendance: 570; Referees: Pepe (Italy) , Stancu (Romania)
18 January 2026; 18:00	Mauny, Modenel 6	(9–14)	Lerby 9	La Fontaine Blanche, Chambray-lès-Tours; Attendance: 570; Referees: Pepe (Italy) , Stancu (Romania)
18 January 2026; 18:00	1× (yellow card) 2× (suspension)	Report	1× (yellow card) 2× (suspension)	La Fontaine Blanche, Chambray-lès-Tours; Attendance: 570; Referees: Pepe (Italy) , Stancu (Romania)

24 January 2026; 20:00	**Chambray Touraine Handball (France)**	**30–31**	**(Hungary) MOL Esztergom**	La Fontaine Blanche, Chambray-lès-Tours; Attendance: 900; Referees: Oyarzun, Zaragüeta (SPA)
24 January 2026; 20:00	Faynel, Stoiljković 7	(14–15)	Faragó, Horváth 6	La Fontaine Blanche, Chambray-lès-Tours; Attendance: 900; Referees: Oyarzun, Zaragüeta (SPA)
24 January 2026; 20:00		Report		La Fontaine Blanche, Chambray-lès-Tours; Attendance: 900; Referees: Oyarzun, Zaragüeta (SPA)

25 January 2026; 18:00	**HSG Blomberg-Lippe (Germany)**	**22–29**	**(Denmark) Nykøbing Falster Håndboldklub**	Phoenix Contact-Arena, Lemgo; Attendance: 1,202; Referees: Dašić, Husomanović (NOR)
25 January 2026; 18:00	Magnúsdóttir 7	(14–16)	Magnussen 7	Phoenix Contact-Arena, Lemgo; Attendance: 1,202; Referees: Dašić, Husomanović (NOR)
25 January 2026; 18:00	2× (yellow card) 5× (suspension)	Report	1× (yellow card) 5× (suspension) 1× (red card)	Phoenix Contact-Arena, Lemgo; Attendance: 1,202; Referees: Dašić, Husomanović (NOR)

7 February 2026; 20:00	**Nykøbing Falster Håndboldklub (Denmark)**	**30–30**	**(Germany) HSG Blomberg-Lippe**	SPAR NORD Boxen, Nykøbing Falster; Attendance: 1,397; Referees: Rauchs, Linster (LUX)
7 February 2026; 20:00	Bang 8	(16–16)	Kühne 9	SPAR NORD Boxen, Nykøbing Falster; Attendance: 1,397; Referees: Rauchs, Linster (LUX)
7 February 2026; 20:00	1× (yellow card) 2× (suspension)	Report	3× (suspension)	SPAR NORD Boxen, Nykøbing Falster; Attendance: 1,397; Referees: Rauchs, Linster (LUX)

8 February 2026; 18:00	**MOL Esztergom (Hungary)**	**24–22**	**(France) Chambray Touraine Handball**	Suzuki Aréna, Esztergom; Attendance: 1,000; Referees: Pavićević, Martinović (MNE)
8 February 2026; 18:00	Faragó 8	(8–9)	Modenel, Stoiljković 4	Suzuki Aréna, Esztergom; Attendance: 1,000; Referees: Pavićević, Martinović (MNE)
8 February 2026; 18:00	2× (yellow card) 4× (suspension)	Report	4× (suspension)	Suzuki Aréna, Esztergom; Attendance: 1,000; Referees: Pavićević, Martinović (MNE)

14 February 2026; 20:00	**Chambray Touraine Handball (France)**	**27–31**	**(Germany) HSG Blomberg-Lippe**	La Fontaine Blanche, Chambray-lès-Tours; Attendance: 950; Referees: Charitsos, Naskos (GRE)
14 February 2026; 20:00	Stoiljković 7	(12–17)	Hauf 6	La Fontaine Blanche, Chambray-lès-Tours; Attendance: 950; Referees: Charitsos, Naskos (GRE)
14 February 2026; 20:00	2× (suspension)	Report	1× (yellow card) 3× (suspension)	La Fontaine Blanche, Chambray-lès-Tours; Attendance: 950; Referees: Charitsos, Naskos (GRE)

15 February 2026; 18:00	**MOL Esztergom (Hungary)**	**30–25**	**(Denmark) Nykøbing Falster Håndboldklub**	Suzuki Aréna, Esztergom; Attendance: 1,040; Referees: Bošnjak, Marić (BIH)
15 February 2026; 18:00	Kovács 7	(15–10)	Svele 8	Suzuki Aréna, Esztergom; Attendance: 1,040; Referees: Bošnjak, Marić (BIH)
15 February 2026; 18:00	4× (suspension)	Report	1× (yellow card) 2× (suspension)	Suzuki Aréna, Esztergom; Attendance: 1,040; Referees: Bošnjak, Marić (BIH)

22 February 2026; 18:00	**Nykøbing Falster Håndboldklub (Denmark)**	**21–21**	**(France) Chambray Touraine Handball**	SPAR NORD Boxen, Nykøbing Falster; Attendance: 1,197; Referees: Pukšič, Satler (SLO)
22 February 2026; 18:00	Lerby 6	(11–11)	Holmberg 5	SPAR NORD Boxen, Nykøbing Falster; Attendance: 1,197; Referees: Pukšič, Satler (SLO)
22 February 2026; 18:00	2× (yellow card) 1× (suspension)	Report	1× (yellow card) 4× (suspension)	SPAR NORD Boxen, Nykøbing Falster; Attendance: 1,197; Referees: Pukšič, Satler (SLO)

22 February 2026; 18:00	**HSG Blomberg-Lippe (Germany)**	**31–31**	**(Hungary) MOL Esztergom**	Phoenix Contact-Arena, Lemgo; Attendance: 1,171; Referees: Klompers, Stobbe (NED)
22 February 2026; 18:00	Kühne, Mühlner 6	(13–15)	Varga 8	Phoenix Contact-Arena, Lemgo; Attendance: 1,171; Referees: Klompers, Stobbe (NED)
22 February 2026; 18:00	1× (yellow card) 1× (suspension)	Report	2× (yellow card) 4× (suspension)	Phoenix Contact-Arena, Lemgo; Attendance: 1,171; Referees: Klompers, Stobbe (NED)

=== Group C ===
Pos	Team	Pld	W	D	L	GF	GA	GD	Pts	Qualification	BUC	ZAG	BRG	OLD
1	(Romania) CS Rapid București	6	3	2	1	182	170	+12	**8**	Quarterfinals	—	24–29	32–32	34–30
2	(Croatia) RK Lokomotiva Zagreb	6	3	1	2	167	160	+7	**7**	Quarterfinals	28–28	—	26–29	28–29
3	(Norway) Tertnes Bergen	6	2	1	3	177	180	−3	**5**		28–30	26–29	—	26–31
4	(Germany) VfL Oldenburg	6	2	0	4	169	185	−16	**4**		23–34	24–27	32–36	—

Source: EHF

10 January 2026; 16:00	**VfL Oldenburg (Germany)**	**24–27**	**(Croatia) RK Lokomotiva Zagreb**	EWE Arena, Oldenburg; Attendance: 850; Referees: Bujupi, Bujupi (KOS)
10 January 2026; 16:00	Behrend 7	(5–11)	Posavec 5	EWE Arena, Oldenburg; Attendance: 850; Referees: Bujupi, Bujupi (KOS)
10 January 2026; 16:00	1× (suspension)	Report	1× (yellow card) 6× (suspension)	EWE Arena, Oldenburg; Attendance: 850; Referees: Bujupi, Bujupi (KOS)

11 January 2026; 15:00	**CS Rapid București (Romania)**	**32–32**	**(Norway) Tertnes Bergen**	Polyvalent Hall, București; Attendance: 2,430; Referees: Pavićević, Martinović (MNE)
11 January 2026; 15:00	Kassoma, Polman 7	(15–18)	Hagen 7	Polyvalent Hall, București; Attendance: 2,430; Referees: Pavićević, Martinović (MNE)
11 January 2026; 15:00	2× (suspension)	Report	1× (suspension)	Polyvalent Hall, București; Attendance: 2,430; Referees: Pavićević, Martinović (MNE)

17 January 2026; 20:00	**RK Lokomotiva Zagreb (Croatia)**	**28–28**	**(Romania) CS Rapid București**	High School Jelkovec, Zagreb; Attendance: 1,200; Referees: Přemysl, Radek (CZE)
17 January 2026; 20:00	Posavec 7	(13–12)	Lopes 6	High School Jelkovec, Zagreb; Attendance: 1,200; Referees: Přemysl, Radek (CZE)
17 January 2026; 20:00	2× (yellow card) 3× (suspension)	Report	3× (suspension)	High School Jelkovec, Zagreb; Attendance: 1,200; Referees: Přemysl, Radek (CZE)

18 January 2026; 14:00	**Tertnes Bergen (Norway)**	**26–31**	**(Germany) VfL Oldenburg**	Åsane Arena, Bergen; Attendance: 287; Referees: Pagh, Thygesen (DEN)
18 January 2026; 14:00	Frei 5	(16–13)	Reinemann 9	Åsane Arena, Bergen; Attendance: 287; Referees: Pagh, Thygesen (DEN)
18 January 2026; 14:00	2× (suspension)	Report	1× (suspension)	Åsane Arena, Bergen; Attendance: 287; Referees: Pagh, Thygesen (DEN)

24 January 2026; 16:00	**Tertnes Bergen (Norway)**	**26–29**	**(Croatia) RK Lokomotiva Zagreb**	Åsane Arena, Bergen; Attendance: 371; Referees: Geraets, Geraets (NED)
24 January 2026; 16:00	Kruse, Midtfjeld 5	(12–14)	Posavec 10	Åsane Arena, Bergen; Attendance: 371; Referees: Geraets, Geraets (NED)
24 January 2026; 16:00	3× (suspension)	Report	1× (suspension)	Åsane Arena, Bergen; Attendance: 371; Referees: Geraets, Geraets (NED)

24 January 2026; 17:00	**CS Rapid București (Romania)**	**34–30**	**(Germany) VfL Oldenburg**	Polyvalent Hall, București; Attendance: 1,100; Referees: Pukšič, Sattler (SLO)
24 January 2026; 17:00	Korsós 6	(17–16)	Behrend, Granicka 7	Polyvalent Hall, București; Attendance: 1,100; Referees: Pukšič, Sattler (SLO)
24 January 2026; 17:00	2× (suspension)	Report	1× (yellow card) 5× (suspension)	Polyvalent Hall, București; Attendance: 1,100; Referees: Pukšič, Sattler (SLO)

7 February 2026; 20:00	**RK Lokomotiva Zagreb (Croatia)**	**26–29**	**(Norway) Tertnes Bergen**	Sutinska Vrela, Zagreb; Attendance: 450; Referees: Cournil, Lamour (FRA)
7 February 2026; 20:00	Đelekovčan, Posavec, Zrilić 6	(16–10)	Midtfjeld 5	Sutinska Vrela, Zagreb; Attendance: 450; Referees: Cournil, Lamour (FRA)
7 February 2026; 20:00	2× (suspension)	Report	4× (suspension)	Sutinska Vrela, Zagreb; Attendance: 450; Referees: Cournil, Lamour (FRA)

8 February 2026; 18:00	**VfL Oldenburg (Germany)**	**23–34**	**(Romania) CS Rapid București**	EWE Arena, Oldenburg; Attendance: 1,789; Referees: Fält, Holm (SWE)
8 February 2026; 18:00	Granicka 6	(10–16)	Chambertin, Polman 5	EWE Arena, Oldenburg; Attendance: 1,789; Referees: Fält, Holm (SWE)
8 February 2026; 18:00	1× (yellow card) 1× (suspension)	Report	5× (suspension)	EWE Arena, Oldenburg; Attendance: 1,789; Referees: Fält, Holm (SWE)

15 February 2026; 14:00	**Tertnes Bergen (Norway)**	**28–30**	**(Romania) CS Rapid București**	Åsane Arena, Bergen; Attendance: 598; Referees: Uhlíř, Beňuš (CZE)
15 February 2026; 14:00	Rosenberg 9	(13–16)	Polman 8	Åsane Arena, Bergen; Attendance: 598; Referees: Uhlíř, Beňuš (CZE)
15 February 2026; 14:00	1× (yellow card) 2× (suspension)	Report	4× (suspension)	Åsane Arena, Bergen; Attendance: 598; Referees: Uhlíř, Beňuš (CZE)

15 February 2026; 16:00	**RK Lokomotiva Zagreb (Croatia)**	**28–29**	**(Germany) VfL Oldenburg**	Sutinska Vrela, Zagreb; Attendance: 462; Referees: Bočáková, Jánošíková (SVK)
15 February 2026; 16:00	Posavec 7	(9–16)	Borutta 7	Sutinska Vrela, Zagreb; Attendance: 462; Referees: Bočáková, Jánošíková (SVK)
15 February 2026; 16:00	1× (suspension)	Report	6× (suspension) 1× (red card)	Sutinska Vrela, Zagreb; Attendance: 462; Referees: Bočáková, Jánošíková (SVK)

22 February 2026; 16:00	**VfL Oldenburg (Germany)**	**32–36**	**(Norway) Tertnes Bergen**	Halle Nord, Buxtehude; Attendance: 554; Referees: Jakovljević, Kovačević (SRB)
22 February 2026; 16:00	Korsten, Reinemann, Steffen 6	(15–15)	Hagen 11	Halle Nord, Buxtehude; Attendance: 554; Referees: Jakovljević, Kovačević (SRB)
22 February 2026; 16:00	1× (yellow card) 2× (suspension)	Report	1× (yellow card) 5× (suspension)	Halle Nord, Buxtehude; Attendance: 554; Referees: Jakovljević, Kovačević (SRB)

22 February 2026; 17:00	**CS Rapid București (Romania)**	**24–29**	**(Croatia) RK Lokomotiva Zagreb**	Polyvalent Hall, București; Attendance: 1,117; Referees: Oyarzun, Zaragüeta (SPA)
22 February 2026; 17:00	Lopes 7	(13–17)	Posavec, Zrilić 6	Polyvalent Hall, București; Attendance: 1,117; Referees: Oyarzun, Zaragüeta (SPA)
22 February 2026; 17:00	1× (yellow card) 4× (suspension)	Report	1× (yellow card) 2× (suspension)	Polyvalent Hall, București; Attendance: 1,117; Referees: Oyarzun, Zaragüeta (SPA)

=== Group D ===
Pos	Team	Pld	W	D	L	GF	GA	GD	Pts	Qualification	DIJ	VIB	BRA	LUB
1	(France) JDA Bourgogne Dijon HB	6	4	1	1	191	175	+16	**9**	Quarterfinals	—	30–30	26–30	31–26
2	(Denmark) Viborg HK	6	3	2	1	203	188	+15	**8**	Quarterfinals	32–33	—	33–33	42–38
3	(Romania) CS Corona Brașov	6	3	1	2	193	189	+4	**7**		30–35	28–34	—	33–30
4	(Poland) KGHM MKS Zagłębie Lubin	6	0	0	6	178	213	−35	**0**		27–36	26–32	31–39	—

Source: EHF

10 January 2026; 18:00	**Viborg HK (Denmark)**	**42–38**	**(Poland) KGHM MKS Zagłębie Lubin**	BioCirc Arena, Viborg; Attendance: 801; Referees: Riello, Panetta (ITA)
10 January 2026; 18:00	Martinsen 12	(18–20)	Kochaniak 7	BioCirc Arena, Viborg; Attendance: 801; Referees: Riello, Panetta (ITA)
10 January 2026; 18:00	4× (suspension)	Report	3× (suspension)	BioCirc Arena, Viborg; Attendance: 801; Referees: Riello, Panetta (ITA)

11 January 2026; 19:00	**CSM Corona Brașov (Romania)**	**30–35**	**(France) JDA Bourgogne Dijon HB**	Sala Sporturilor Dumitru Popescu Colibași, Brașov; Attendance: 1,300; Referees: Charitsos, Naskos (GRE)
11 January 2026; 19:00	Krpež Šlezak 11	(16–19)	Gayet 8	Sala Sporturilor Dumitru Popescu Colibași, Brașov; Attendance: 1,300; Referees: Charitsos, Naskos (GRE)
11 January 2026; 19:00	2× (suspension)	Report	1× (yellow card) 3× (suspension)	Sala Sporturilor Dumitru Popescu Colibași, Brașov; Attendance: 1,300; Referees: Charitsos, Naskos (GRE)

18 January 2026; 14:00	**JDA Bourgogne Dijon HB (France)**	**30–30**	**(Denmark) Viborg HK**	Palais des Sports JM Geoffroy, Dijon; Attendance: 1,100; Referees: Radčenko, Pērsis (LAT)
18 January 2026; 14:00	Henry, Offendal, Vautier 5	(13–15)	Mittún 8	Palais des Sports JM Geoffroy, Dijon; Attendance: 1,100; Referees: Radčenko, Pērsis (LAT)
18 January 2026; 14:00	4× (suspension)	Report	6× (suspension)	Palais des Sports JM Geoffroy, Dijon; Attendance: 1,100; Referees: Radčenko, Pērsis (LAT)

18 January 2026; 18:00	**KGHM MKS Zagłębie Lubin (Poland)**	**31–39**	**(Romania) CSM Corona Brașov**	Hala Widowiskowo Sportowa RCS, Lubin; Attendance: 3,213; Referees: Bošnjak, Marić (BIH)
18 January 2026; 18:00	Grzyb 8	(12–24)	Krpež Šlezak 7	Hala Widowiskowo Sportowa RCS, Lubin; Attendance: 3,213; Referees: Bošnjak, Marić (BIH)
18 January 2026; 18:00	2× (suspension)	Report	5× (suspension)	Hala Widowiskowo Sportowa RCS, Lubin; Attendance: 3,213; Referees: Bošnjak, Marić (BIH)

24 January 2026; 16:00	**Viborg HK (Denmark)**	**33–33**	**(Romania) CSM Corona Brașov**	BioCirc Arena, Viborg; Attendance: 942; Referees: Klompers, Stobbe (NED)
24 January 2026; 16:00	Martinsen 8	(17–19)	Krpež Šlezak 13	BioCirc Arena, Viborg; Attendance: 942; Referees: Klompers, Stobbe (NED)
24 January 2026; 16:00	1× (yellow card) 4× (suspension)	Report	1× (yellow card) 4× (suspension)	BioCirc Arena, Viborg; Attendance: 942; Referees: Klompers, Stobbe (NED)

25 January 2026; 14:00	**JDA Bourgogne Dijon HB (France)**	**31–26**	**(Poland) KGHM MKS Zagłębie Lubin**	Palais des Sports JM Geoffroy, Dijon; Attendance: 800; Referees: Borge, Nygren (NOR)
25 January 2026; 14:00	Offendal 7	(16–14)	Jakubowska 8	Palais des Sports JM Geoffroy, Dijon; Attendance: 800; Referees: Borge, Nygren (NOR)
25 January 2026; 14:00	5× (suspension)	Report	5× (suspension)	Palais des Sports JM Geoffroy, Dijon; Attendance: 800; Referees: Borge, Nygren (NOR)

8 February 2026; 14:00	**KGHM MKS Zagłębie Lubin (Poland)**	**27–36**	**(France) JDA Bourgogne Dijon HB**	Hala Widowiskowo Sportowa RCS, Lubin; Attendance: 2,612; Referees: Hellbusch, Jansen (GER)
8 February 2026; 14:00	Kochaniak 5	(16–17)	Lønborg 8	Hala Widowiskowo Sportowa RCS, Lubin; Attendance: 2,612; Referees: Hellbusch, Jansen (GER)
8 February 2026; 14:00	4× (suspension)	Report	2× (suspension)	Hala Widowiskowo Sportowa RCS, Lubin; Attendance: 2,612; Referees: Hellbusch, Jansen (GER)

8 February 2026; 15:00	**CSM Corona Brașov (Romania)**	**28–34**	**(Denmark) Viborg HK**	Sala Sporturilor Dumitru Popescu Colibași, Brașov; Attendance: 1,500; Referees: Dáné, Marton (HUN)
8 February 2026; 15:00	Grozav 6	(17–17)	Petersen 7	Sala Sporturilor Dumitru Popescu Colibași, Brașov; Attendance: 1,500; Referees: Dáné, Marton (HUN)
8 February 2026; 15:00	3× (suspension)	Report	3× (suspension)	Sala Sporturilor Dumitru Popescu Colibași, Brașov; Attendance: 1,500; Referees: Dáné, Marton (HUN)

15 February 2026; 14:00	**KGHM MKS Zagłębie Lubin (Poland)**	**26–32**	**(Denmark) Viborg HK**	Hala Widowiskowo Sportowa RCS, Lubin; Attendance: 1,998; Referees: Ilievski, Ilievski (MKD)
15 February 2026; 14:00	Fernándes 7	(17–15)	Petersen 7	Hala Widowiskowo Sportowa RCS, Lubin; Attendance: 1,998; Referees: Ilievski, Ilievski (MKD)
15 February 2026; 14:00	1× (yellow card) 3× (suspension)	Report	5× (suspension)	Hala Widowiskowo Sportowa RCS, Lubin; Attendance: 1,998; Referees: Ilievski, Ilievski (MKD)

15 February 2026; 18:00	**JDA Bourgogne Dijon HB (France)**	**26–30**	**(Romania) CSM Corona Brașov**	Palais des Sports JM Geoffroy, Dijon; Attendance: 1,942; Referees: Riello, Panetta (ITA)
15 February 2026; 18:00	Lønborg 6	(18–18)	Krpež Šlezak 11	Palais des Sports JM Geoffroy, Dijon; Attendance: 1,942; Referees: Riello, Panetta (ITA)
15 February 2026; 18:00	1× (yellow card) 5× (suspension)	Report	1× (yellow card) 3× (suspension)	Palais des Sports JM Geoffroy, Dijon; Attendance: 1,942; Referees: Riello, Panetta (ITA)

21 February 2026; 20:00	**Viborg HK (Denmark)**	**32–33**	**(France) JDA Bourgogne Dijon HB**	BioCirc Arena, Viborg; Attendance: 972; Referees: Dašić, Husomanović (NOR)
21 February 2026; 20:00	Petersen 8	(15–18)	Lønborg, Pintat 8	BioCirc Arena, Viborg; Attendance: 972; Referees: Dašić, Husomanović (NOR)
21 February 2026; 20:00	4× (suspension)	Report	1× (yellow card) 5× (suspension)	BioCirc Arena, Viborg; Attendance: 972; Referees: Dašić, Husomanović (NOR)

21 February 2026; 21:00	**CSM Corona Brașov (Romania)**	**33–30**	**(Poland) KGHM MKS Zagłębie Lubin**	Sala Sporturilor Dumitru Popescu Colibași, Brașov; Attendance: 1,300; Referees: Janz, Joy Sug (GER)
21 February 2026; 21:00	Boiciuc 9	(18–14)	Grzyb 6	Sala Sporturilor Dumitru Popescu Colibași, Brașov; Attendance: 1,300; Referees: Janz, Joy Sug (GER)
21 February 2026; 21:00	4× (suspension)	Report	2× (suspension)	Sala Sporturilor Dumitru Popescu Colibași, Brașov; Attendance: 1,300; Referees: Janz, Joy Sug (GER)
