= 2025–26 Women's EHF European League qualification round =

Handball tournament qualifier

Women's EHF European League qualification round
- 2025–26

Tournament information
- Sport: Handball
- Date: 27 September – 16 November 2025
- Teams: 32

Tournament statistics
- Matches played: 40

External videos
- 2025–26 Women's EHF European League qualification round – Draw
- Draw Live Stream

The 2025–26 Women's EHF European League qualification round decided the last twelve qualifiers for the European League group stage.

== Format ==
In round 2, eighteen teams are separated into nine home and away play offs. The nine aggregate winners advance to Round 3. In round 3, twenty four teams are divided into twelve home and away play offs. The twelve winners on aggregate advance to the group stage.

== Teams ==
Round 3
(Croatia) RK Lokomotiva Zagreb	(Croatia) HC Dalmatinka Ploče	(Denmark) Viborg HK	(France) JDA Bourgogne Dijon HB
(France) Chambray Touraine Handball	(Germany) HSG Blomberg-Lippe	(Germany) HSG Bensheim/Auerbach	(Germany) Vfl Oldenburg
(Hungary) MOL Esztergom	(Norway) Larvik HK	(Poland) KGHM MKS Zagłębie Lubin	(Poland) PGE MKS El-Volt Lublin
(Romania) CS Minaur Baia Mare	(Spain) Super Amara Bera Bera		
Round 2
(Austria) Hypo Niederösterreich	(Czech Republic) DHK Baník Most	(Denmark) HH Elite	(France) ESBF Besançon
(Greece) OF Nea Ionia	(Hungary) Mosonmagyaróvári KC SE	(Iceland) Valur	(Netherlands) JuRo Unirek VZV
(Norway) Molde Elite	(Portugal) SL Benfica	(Romania) CS Rapid București	(Serbia) ŽRK Crvena zvezda
(Sweden) IK Sävehof	(Sweden) Skara HF	(Switzerland) LC Brühl Handball	(Switzerland) Spono Eagles
(Switzerland) GC Amicitia Zürich	(Turkey) Armada Praxis Yalikavakspor		

== Round 2 ==
=== Draw ===
The draw for the qualification round was conducted on 15 July 2025 in Vienna, Austria. The bold text indicate which teams advanced.

Seeding
Seeded	Unseeded
(Sweden) Skara HF (Switzerland) LC Brühl Handball (Czech Republic) DHK Baník Most (Serbia) **ŽRK Crvena zvezda** (Turkey) Armada Praxis Yalikavakspor (Austria) Hypo Niederösterreich (Portugal) SL Benfica (Greece) O.F.N. Ionia (Netherlands) JuRo Unirek VZV	(Iceland) **Valur** (Sweden) **IK Sävehof** (Switzerland) Spono Eagles (Denmark) **HH Elite** (Norway) **Molde Elite** (Romania) **CS Rapid București** (France) **ESBF Besançon** (Hungary) **Motherson Mosonmagyaróvár** (Switzerland) **GC Amicitia Zürich**

=== Summary ===
There were 18 teams participating in round 2. The first legs were played on 27–28 September and the second legs were played on 4–5 October 2025.

Team 1	Agg.	Team 2	1st leg	2nd leg
**Molde Elite** (Norway)	53–51	(Sweden) Skara HF	27–24	26–27
Armada Praxis Yalikavakspor (Turkey)	48–64	(Denmark) **HH Elite**	25–24	23–40
**Motherson Mosonmagyaróvár** (Note: Directly advanced to the group phase) (Hungary)	63–36	(Greece) O.F.N. Ionia	31–17	32–19
Spono Eagles (Switzerland)	47–66	(Serbia) **ŽRK Crvena zvezda**	23–37	24–29
Hypo Niederösterreich (Austria)	43–62	(Romania) **CS Rapid București**	24–32	19–30
LC Brühl Handball (Switzerland)	53–61	(Switzerland) **GC Amicitia Zürich**	23–36	30–25
**IK Sävehof** (Sweden)	58–55	(Portugal) SL Benfica	29–28	29–27
**ESBF Besançon** (France)	64–57	(Czech Republic) DHK Baník Most	34–28	30–29
JuRo Unirek VZV (Netherlands)	56–61	(Iceland) **Valur**	30–31	26–30

==== Matches ====
27 September 2025; 17:00	**Molde Elite (Norway)**	**27–24**	**(Sweden) Skara HF**	Molde Arena, Molde; Attendance: 473; Referees: Petursson, Thrastarson (ISL)
27 September 2025; 17:00	Carlson 5	(15–11)	Jaspers, Säreborn 5	Molde Arena, Molde; Attendance: 473; Referees: Petursson, Thrastarson (ISL)
27 September 2025; 17:00	3× (suspension)	Report	1× (yellow card) 3× (suspension)	Molde Arena, Molde; Attendance: 473; Referees: Petursson, Thrastarson (ISL)

4 October 2025; 14:00	**Skara HF (Sweden)**	**27–26**	**(Norway) Molde Elite**	Idrottshallen Skara, Skara; Attendance: 586; Referees: Pagh, Thygesen (DEN)
4 October 2025; 14:00	Säreborn 8	(14–12)	Carlson 9	Idrottshallen Skara, Skara; Attendance: 586; Referees: Pagh, Thygesen (DEN)
4 October 2025; 14:00	1× (yellow card) 1× (suspension)	Report		Idrottshallen Skara, Skara; Attendance: 586; Referees: Pagh, Thygesen (DEN)

Molde Elite won 53–51 on aggregate.

28 September 2025; 16:00	**Armada Praxis Yalikavakspor (Turkey)**	**25–24**	**(Denmark) HH Elite**	Binnaz Karakaya Sports Hall, Muğla; Attendance: 300; Referees: Pirvu, Potirniche (ROU)
28 September 2025; 16:00	Tügel 8	(14–11)	Rasmussen 6	Binnaz Karakaya Sports Hall, Muğla; Attendance: 300; Referees: Pirvu, Potirniche (ROU)
28 September 2025; 16:00	2× (suspension)	Report	1× (yellow card) 3× (suspension) 1× (red card)	Binnaz Karakaya Sports Hall, Muğla; Attendance: 300; Referees: Pirvu, Potirniche (ROU)

4 October 2025; 16:00	**HH Elite (Denmark)**	**40–23**	**(Turkey) Armada Praxis Yalikavakspor**	Torstedhallen, Horsens; Attendance: 579; Referees: Hellbusch, Jansen (GER)
4 October 2025; 16:00	Rasmussen 7	(19–13)	Tügel 11	Torstedhallen, Horsens; Attendance: 579; Referees: Hellbusch, Jansen (GER)
4 October 2025; 16:00	2× (suspension)	Report	5× (suspension)	Torstedhallen, Horsens; Attendance: 579; Referees: Hellbusch, Jansen (GER)

HH Elite won 64–48 on aggregate.

3 October 2025; 18:00	**Motherson Mosonmagyaróvár (Hungary)**	**31–17**	**(Greece) O.F.N. Ionia**	UFM Aréna, Mosonmagyaróvár; Attendance: 525; Referees: Jakovljevic, Sando Kovacevic (SRB)
3 October 2025; 18:00	Tóth 7	(17–10)	Tsakalou 8	UFM Aréna, Mosonmagyaróvár; Attendance: 525; Referees: Jakovljevic, Sando Kovacevic (SRB)
3 October 2025; 18:00	1× (suspension)	Report	3× (suspension)	UFM Aréna, Mosonmagyaróvár; Attendance: 525; Referees: Jakovljevic, Sando Kovacevic (SRB)

5 October 2025; 12:00	**O.F.N. Ionia (Greece)**	**19–32**	**(Hungary) Motherson Mosonmagyaróvár**	UFM Aréna, Mosonmagyaróvár; Attendance: 472; Referees: Jakovljevic, Sando Kovacevic (SRB)
5 October 2025; 12:00	Tsakalou 8	(10–16)	Tóth 7	UFM Aréna, Mosonmagyaróvár; Attendance: 472; Referees: Jakovljevic, Sando Kovacevic (SRB)
5 October 2025; 12:00	5× (suspension)	Report	1× (yellow card) 1× (suspension)	UFM Aréna, Mosonmagyaróvár; Attendance: 472; Referees: Jakovljevic, Sando Kovacevic (SRB)

Motherson Mosonmagyaróvár won 63–36 on aggregate.

27 September 2025; 16:00	**Spono Eagles (Switzerland)**	**23–37**	**(Serbia) ŽRK Crvena zvezda**	Sportski Centar "Vozdovac", Belgrade; Attendance: 1,200; Referees: Loncar, Loncar (CRO)
27 September 2025; 16:00	Herger 7	(10–15)	Garovic 8	Sportski Centar "Vozdovac", Belgrade; Attendance: 1,200; Referees: Loncar, Loncar (CRO)
27 September 2025; 16:00	3× (suspension)	Report	3× (suspension)	Sportski Centar "Vozdovac", Belgrade; Attendance: 1,200; Referees: Loncar, Loncar (CRO)

28 September 2025; 15:30	**ŽRK Crvena zvezda (Serbia)**	**29–24**	**(Switzerland) Spono Eagles**	Sportski Centar "Vozdovac", Belgrade; Attendance: 715; Referees: Loncar, Loncar (CRO)
28 September 2025; 15:30	Nedeljkovic 10	(15–10)	Herger 7	Sportski Centar "Vozdovac", Belgrade; Attendance: 715; Referees: Loncar, Loncar (CRO)
28 September 2025; 15:30	1× (yellow card) 7× (suspension)	Report	4× (suspension)	Sportski Centar "Vozdovac", Belgrade; Attendance: 715; Referees: Loncar, Loncar (CRO)

ŽRK Crvena zvezda won 66–47 on aggregate.

27 September 2025; 18:00	**Hypo Niederösterreich (Austria)**	**24–32**	**(Romania) CS Rapid București**	BSFZ Südstadt, Maria Enzersdorf; Referees: Cindric, Gonzurek (CRO)
27 September 2025; 18:00	Mihalics 6	(12–19)	Kassoma, Kouyaté 5	BSFZ Südstadt, Maria Enzersdorf; Referees: Cindric, Gonzurek (CRO)
27 September 2025; 18:00	3× (suspension)	Report	2× (suspension)	BSFZ Südstadt, Maria Enzersdorf; Referees: Cindric, Gonzurek (CRO)

4 October 2025; 16:00	**CS Rapid București (Romania)**	**30–19**	**(Austria) Hypo Niederösterreich**	Concordia Hall Chiajna, Bucharest; Attendance: 780; Referees: Peretz, Schwartz (ISR)
4 October 2025; 16:00	Pascoal 6	(14–9)	Barnjak 5	Concordia Hall Chiajna, Bucharest; Attendance: 780; Referees: Peretz, Schwartz (ISR)
4 October 2025; 16:00	2× (suspension)	Report	2× (suspension)	Concordia Hall Chiajna, Bucharest; Attendance: 780; Referees: Peretz, Schwartz (ISR)

CS Rapid București won 62–43 on aggregate.

27 September 2025; 18:30	**LC Brühl Handball (Switzerland)**	**23–36**	**(Switzerland) GC Amicitia Zürich**	Sporthalle Kreuzbleiche, St-Gallen; Attendance: 500; Referees: Hummelgard, Svensson (SWE)
27 September 2025; 18:30	Truchot 6	(10–16)	Schlaepfer 9	Sporthalle Kreuzbleiche, St-Gallen; Attendance: 500; Referees: Hummelgard, Svensson (SWE)
27 September 2025; 18:30	1× (yellow card) 3× (suspension)	Report	1× (yellow card) 4× (suspension)	Sporthalle Kreuzbleiche, St-Gallen; Attendance: 500; Referees: Hummelgard, Svensson (SWE)

4 October 2025; 15:00	**GC Amicitia Zürich (Switzerland)**	**25–30**	**(Switzerland) LC Brühl Handball**	Saalsporthalle, Zürich; Attendance: 500; Referees: Nygaard, Primdahl (DEN)
4 October 2025; 15:00	Kündig 6	(13–15)	Altherr 7	Saalsporthalle, Zürich; Attendance: 500; Referees: Nygaard, Primdahl (DEN)
4 October 2025; 15:00	1× (yellow card) 4× (suspension)	Report	1× (yellow card) 3× (suspension)	Saalsporthalle, Zürich; Attendance: 500; Referees: Nygaard, Primdahl (DEN)

GC Amicitia Zürich won 61–53 on aggregate.

28 September 2025; 14:30	**IK Sävehof (Sweden)**	**29–28**	**(Portugal) SL Benfica**	Partille Arena, Partille; Attendance: 638; Referees: Yovchev, Yovchev (BUL)
28 September 2025; 14:30	Þorkelsdóttir 8	(13–12)	Sequeira 11	Partille Arena, Partille; Attendance: 638; Referees: Yovchev, Yovchev (BUL)
28 September 2025; 14:30	1× (yellow card) 5× (suspension) 1× (red card)	Report	5× (suspension)	Partille Arena, Partille; Attendance: 638; Referees: Yovchev, Yovchev (BUL)

4 October 2025; 17:30	**SL Benfica (Portugal)**	**27–29**	**(Sweden) IK Sävehof**	Pavilhão da Luz Nᵒ 2, Lisbon; Attendance: 453; Referees: Cournil, Lamour (FRA)
4 October 2025; 17:30	Sequeira 11	(15–16)	Þorkelsdóttir 7	Pavilhão da Luz Nᵒ 2, Lisbon; Attendance: 453; Referees: Cournil, Lamour (FRA)
4 October 2025; 17:30	1× (yellow card) 4× (suspension)	Report	2× (yellow card)	Pavilhão da Luz Nᵒ 2, Lisbon; Attendance: 453; Referees: Cournil, Lamour (FRA)

IK Sävehof won 58–55 on aggregate.

27 September 2025; 19:00	**ESBF Besançon (France)**	**34–28**	**(Czech Republic) DHK Baník Most**	Palais des Sports Ghani Yalouz, Besançon; Attendance: 2,000; Referees: Alvarez Menendez, Soria Fabian (ESP)
27 September 2025; 19:00	Mairot 9	(17–17)	Šustácková 9	Palais des Sports Ghani Yalouz, Besançon; Attendance: 2,000; Referees: Alvarez Menendez, Soria Fabian (ESP)
27 September 2025; 19:00	3× (suspension)	Report	3× (suspension)	Palais des Sports Ghani Yalouz, Besançon; Attendance: 2,000; Referees: Alvarez Menendez, Soria Fabian (ESP)

5 October 2025; 18:00	**DHK Baník Most (Czech Republic)**	**29–30**	**(France) ESBF Besançon**	Sportovni hala, Most; Attendance: 425; Referees: Maia, Nunes (POR)
5 October 2025; 18:00	Andrýsková 11	(12–18)	Bellec 5	Sportovni hala, Most; Attendance: 425; Referees: Maia, Nunes (POR)
5 October 2025; 18:00	4× (suspension)	Report	2× (suspension)	Sportovni hala, Most; Attendance: 425; Referees: Maia, Nunes (POR)

ESBF Besançon won 64–57 on aggregate.

27 September 2025; 19:00	**JuRo Unirek VZV (Netherlands)**	**30–31**	**(Iceland) Valur**	Sportcentrum VZV, 't Veld; Referees: Bocakova, Janosikova (SVK)
27 September 2025; 19:00	Schop 8	(16–15)	Ágústsdóttir 9	Sportcentrum VZV, 't Veld; Referees: Bocakova, Janosikova (SVK)
27 September 2025; 19:00	1× (yellow card) 4× (suspension)	Report	1× (yellow card) 5× (suspension)	Sportcentrum VZV, 't Veld; Referees: Bocakova, Janosikova (SVK)

5 October 2025; 18:00	**Valur (Iceland)**	**30–26**	**(Netherlands) JuRo Unirek VZV**	N1 höllin, Reykjavík; Attendance: 326; Referees: Sniurevicius, Grigalionis (LTU)
5 October 2025; 18:00	Sturludóttir 6	(17–11)	Kruijer 9	N1 höllin, Reykjavík; Attendance: 326; Referees: Sniurevicius, Grigalionis (LTU)
5 October 2025; 18:00	4× (suspension)	Report	3× (suspension)	N1 höllin, Reykjavík; Attendance: 326; Referees: Sniurevicius, Grigalionis (LTU)

Valur won 61–56 on aggregate.

== Round 3 ==
=== Draw ===
The draw for the qualification round was conducted on 15 July 2025 in Vienna, Austria. The bold text indicate which teams advanced.

Seeding
Seeded	Unseeded
(Denmark) **Viborg HK** (Germany) **HSG Blomberg-Lippe** (Germany) HSG Bensheim/Auerbach (Norway) **Tertnes Bergen** (Romania) **Motherson Mosonmagyaróvár** (France) **JDA Bourgogne Dijon HB** (Hungary) **MOL Esztergom** (Croatia) **RK Lokomotiva Zagreb** (Poland) **KGHM MKS Zagłębie Lubin** (Germany) **Vfl Oldenburg** (Norway) **Larvik HK** (France) **Chambray Touraine Handball**	(Spain) Super Amara Bera Bera (Croatia) HC Dalmatinka Ploče (Poland) PGE MKS El-Volt Lublin (Norway) Molde Elite (Note: Identity not known at the time of the draw.) (Denmark) HH Elite (Note: Identity not known at the time of the draw.) (Hungary) **Motherson Mosonmagyaróvár** (Note: Identity not known at the time of the draw.) (Serbia) ŽRK Crvena zvezda (Note: Identity not known at the time of the draw.) (Romania) **CS Rapid București** (Note: Identity not known at the time of the draw.) (Switzerland) GC Amicitia Zürich (Note: Identity not known at the time of the draw.) (Sweden) IK Sävehof (Note: Identity not known at the time of the draw.) (France) ESBF Besançon (Note: Identity not known at the time of the draw.) (Iceland) Valur (Note: Identity not known at the time of the draw.)

=== Summary ===
There were 22 teams participating in round 3. The first legs were played on 8–9 November and the second legs were played on 15–16 November 2025.

Team 1	Agg.	Team 2	1st leg	2nd leg
PGE MKS El-Volt Lublin (Poland)	54–64	(Poland) **KGHM MKS Zagłębie Lubin**	24–29	30–35
Super Amara Bera Bera (Spain)	46–49	(France) **JDA Bourgogne Dijon HB**	22–19	24–30 ET
**MOL Esztergom** (Hungary)	56–52	(Serbia) ŽRK Crvena zvezda	29–28	27–24
IK Sävehof (Sweden)	61–70	(Denmark) **Viborg HK**	31–31	30–39
**Motherson Mosonmagyaróvár** (Hungary)	(Note: After Tertnes Bergen was given a spot in the group stage, this tie was cancelled and both teams advanced to the group stage.)	(Norway) **Tertnes Bergen**	–	–
**Chambray Touraine Handball** (France)	57–46	(France) ESBF Besançon	29–25	28–21
**Larvik HK** (Norway)	66–56	(Norway) Molde Elite	34–23	32–33
**CS Rapid București** (Romania)	60–55	(Germany) HSG Bensheim/Auerbach	28–34	32–21
**HSG Blomberg-Lippe** (Germany)	59–46	(Iceland) Valur	37–24	22–22
**RK Lokomotiva Zagreb** (Croatia)	54–47	(Switzerland) GC Amicitia Zürich	28–22	26–25
HH Elite (Denmark)	49–54	(Romania) **CS Minaur Baia Mare**	27–21	22–33
**Vfl Oldenburg** (Germany)	75–35	(Croatia) HC Dalmatinka Ploče	36–14	39–21

==== Matches ====
8 November 2025; 16:00	**PGE MKS El-Volt Lublin (Poland)**	**24–29**	**(Poland) KGHM MKS Zagłębie Lubin**	Globus Hall, Lublin; Attendance: 2,730; Referees: Radcenko, Persis (LAT)
8 November 2025; 16:00	Rosiak 7	(14–17)	Jakubowska 8	Globus Hall, Lublin; Attendance: 2,730; Referees: Radcenko, Persis (LAT)
8 November 2025; 16:00	5× (suspension)	Report	7× (suspension)	Globus Hall, Lublin; Attendance: 2,730; Referees: Radcenko, Persis (LAT)

15 November 2025; 18:30	**KGHM MKS Zagłębie Lubin (Poland)**	**35–30**	**(Poland) PGE MKS El-Volt Lublin**	Hala Widowiskowo Sportowa RCS, Lubin; Attendance: 3,200; Referees: Uhlir, Benus (CZE)
15 November 2025; 18:30	Fernándes, Jakubowska 9	(18–14)	Górna, Rosiak 7	Hala Widowiskowo Sportowa RCS, Lubin; Attendance: 3,200; Referees: Uhlir, Benus (CZE)
15 November 2025; 18:30	5× (suspension)	Report	6× (suspension)	Hala Widowiskowo Sportowa RCS, Lubin; Attendance: 3,200; Referees: Uhlir, Benus (CZE)

KGHM MKS Zagłębie Lubin won 64–54 on aggregate.

8 November 2025; 18:00	**Super Amara Bera Bera (Spain)**	**22–19**	**(France) JDA Bourgogne Dijon HB**	Polideportivo Municipal José Antonio Gasca, San Sebastián; Attendance: 1,800; Referees: Berdic, Sorak (SRB)
8 November 2025; 18:00	Karsten 6	(9–8)	Dury, Jodar 5	Polideportivo Municipal José Antonio Gasca, San Sebastián; Attendance: 1,800; Referees: Berdic, Sorak (SRB)
8 November 2025; 18:00	6× (suspension)	Report	2× (yellow card) 10× (suspension)	Polideportivo Municipal José Antonio Gasca, San Sebastián; Attendance: 1,800; Referees: Berdic, Sorak (SRB)

16 November 2026
17:00
JDA Bourgogne Dijon HB (France)
**30–24** **(ET)**
(Spain) Super Amara Bera Bera
Palais des Sports JM Geoffroy, Dijon
Attendance: 1,834
Referees: Marton, Dane (HUN)
Lønborg, Offendal 6
(14–12)
Ogonovszky 5
1× (yellow card) 3× (suspension)
Report
1× (yellow card) 3× (suspension)

FT: 27–24 ET: 3–0

JDA Bourgogne Dijon HB won 49–46 on aggregate.

8 November 2025; 14:00	**MOL Esztergom (Hungary)**	**29–28**	**(Serbia) ŽRK Crvena zvezda**	Suzuki Aréna, Esztergom; Attendance: 1,001; Referees: Yovchev, Yovchev (BUL)
8 November 2025; 14:00	Kovács, Varga 7	(11–16)	Agbaba, Garovic 6	Suzuki Aréna, Esztergom; Attendance: 1,001; Referees: Yovchev, Yovchev (BUL)
8 November 2025; 14:00	2× (yellow card) 4× (suspension)	Report	1× (yellow card) 3× (suspension)	Suzuki Aréna, Esztergom; Attendance: 1,001; Referees: Yovchev, Yovchev (BUL)

15 November 2025; 18:00	**ŽRK Crvena zvezda (Serbia)**	**24–27**	**(Hungary) MOL Esztergom**	Sportski Centar "Vozdovac", Belgrade; Attendance: 1,500; Referees: Ilievski, Ilievski (MKD)
15 November 2025; 18:00	Stamenić 7	(11–15)	Ballai, Varga 5	Sportski Centar "Vozdovac", Belgrade; Attendance: 1,500; Referees: Ilievski, Ilievski (MKD)
15 November 2025; 18:00	1× (yellow card) 2× (suspension)	Report	1× (yellow card) 2× (suspension)	Sportski Centar "Vozdovac", Belgrade; Attendance: 1,500; Referees: Ilievski, Ilievski (MKD)

MOL Esztergom won 56–52 on aggregate.

9 November 2025; 14:30	**IK Sävehof (Sweden)**	**31–31**	**(Denmark) Viborg HK**	Partille Arena, Partille; Attendance: 582; Referees: Fahner, Kubis (POL)
9 November 2025; 14:30	Þorkelsdóttir, Wiksfors 7	(17–14)	Hald 8	Partille Arena, Partille; Attendance: 582; Referees: Fahner, Kubis (POL)
9 November 2025; 14:30	1× (yellow card) 7× (suspension)	Report	3× (suspension)	Partille Arena, Partille; Attendance: 582; Referees: Fahner, Kubis (POL)

15 November 2025; 14:00	**Viborg HK (Denmark)**	**39–30**	**(Sweden) IK Sävehof**	BioCirc Arena, Viborg; Attendance: 914; Referees: Oyarzun Aylagas, Zaragueta Ruiz (ESP)
15 November 2025; 14:00	Thomsen 7	(19–16)	Wiksfors 10	BioCirc Arena, Viborg; Attendance: 914; Referees: Oyarzun Aylagas, Zaragueta Ruiz (ESP)
15 November 2025; 14:00	2× (suspension)	Report	1× (suspension)	BioCirc Arena, Viborg; Attendance: 914; Referees: Oyarzun Aylagas, Zaragueta Ruiz (ESP)

Viborg HK won 70–61 on aggregate.

**Motherson Mosonmagyaróvár (Hungary)**	–	**(Norway) Tertnes Bergen**
	(–)

**Tertnes Bergen (Norway)**	–	**(Hungary) Motherson Mosonmagyaróvár**
	(–)

After Tertnes Bergen automatically reached the group stage, this tie was cancelled and both teams advanced.

8 November 2025; 20:00	**Chambray Touraine Handball (France)**	**29–25**	**(France) ESBF Besançon**	La Fontaine Blanche, Chambray-lès-Tours; Attendance: 873; Referees: Manea, Iliescu (ROU)
8 November 2025; 20:00	Modenel 10	(16–11)	Zazai-Ozil 6	La Fontaine Blanche, Chambray-lès-Tours; Attendance: 873; Referees: Manea, Iliescu (ROU)
8 November 2025; 20:00	10× (suspension)	Report	2× (yellow card) 4× (suspension)	La Fontaine Blanche, Chambray-lès-Tours; Attendance: 873; Referees: Manea, Iliescu (ROU)

15 November 2025; 19:00	**ESBF Besançon (France)**	**21–28**	**(France) Chambray Touraine Handball**	Palais des Sports Ghani Yalouz, Besançon; Attendance: 1,800; Referees: Marton, Dane (HUN)
15 November 2025; 19:00	Mairot, Zazai-Ozil 4	(10–15)	Stoiljković 7	Palais des Sports Ghani Yalouz, Besançon; Attendance: 1,800; Referees: Marton, Dane (HUN)
15 November 2025; 19:00	1× (suspension)	Report	3× (suspension)	Palais des Sports Ghani Yalouz, Besançon; Attendance: 1,800; Referees: Marton, Dane (HUN)

Chambray Touraine Handball won 57–46 on aggregate.

9 November 2025; 16:30	**Larvik HK (Norway)**	**34–23**	**(Norway) Molde Elite**	Jotron Arena, Larvik; Attendance: 1,613; Referees: Pirvu, Potirniche (ROU)
9 November 2025; 16:30	Berg, Ramberg 7	(17–14)	Muri 5	Jotron Arena, Larvik; Attendance: 1,613; Referees: Pirvu, Potirniche (ROU)
9 November 2025; 16:30	2× (yellow card) 3× (suspension)	Report	3× (suspension)	Jotron Arena, Larvik; Attendance: 1,613; Referees: Pirvu, Potirniche (ROU)

16 November 2025; 14:00	**Molde Elite (Norway)**	**33–32**	**(Norway) Larvik HK**	Molde Arena, Molde; Attendance: 235; Referees: Fält, Holm (SWE)
16 November 2025; 14:00	Jacobsen 7	(14–15)	Sæteren, Seierstad 6	Molde Arena, Molde; Attendance: 235; Referees: Fält, Holm (SWE)
16 November 2025; 14:00	1× (suspension)	Report	2× (suspension)	Molde Arena, Molde; Attendance: 235; Referees: Fält, Holm (SWE)

Larvik HK won 66–56 on aggregate.

9 November 2025; 16:00	**CS Rapid București (Romania)**	**28–34**	**(Germany) HSG Bensheim/Auerbach**	Concordia Hall Chiajna, Bucharest; Attendance: 650; Referees: Alvarez Menendez, Soria Fabian (ESP)
9 November 2025; 16:00	Buceschi 7	(13–18)	Engel 10	Concordia Hall Chiajna, Bucharest; Attendance: 650; Referees: Alvarez Menendez, Soria Fabian (ESP)
9 November 2025; 16:00	5× (suspension)	Report	4× (suspension)	Concordia Hall Chiajna, Bucharest; Attendance: 650; Referees: Alvarez Menendez, Soria Fabian (ESP)

15 November 2025; 18:00	**HSG Bensheim/Auerbach (Germany)**	**21–32**	**(Romania) CS Rapid București**	Weststadthalle, Bensheim; Attendance: 1,011; Referees: Brodic, Hodzic (CRO)
15 November 2025; 18:00	Berger 7	(11–17)	Polman 9	Weststadthalle, Bensheim; Attendance: 1,011; Referees: Brodic, Hodzic (CRO)
15 November 2025; 18:00	1× (suspension)	Report	1× (yellow card) 2× (suspension)	Weststadthalle, Bensheim; Attendance: 1,011; Referees: Brodic, Hodzic (CRO)

CS Rapid București won 60–55 on aggregate.

8 November 2025; 17:00	**HSG Blomberg-Lippe (Germany)**	**37–24**	**(Iceland) Valur**	Sporthalle an der Ulmenallee, Blomberg; Attendance: 880; Referees: Bosnjak, Maric (BIH)
8 November 2025; 17:00	Kühne 8	(21–12)	Thompson 6	Sporthalle an der Ulmenallee, Blomberg; Attendance: 880; Referees: Bosnjak, Maric (BIH)
8 November 2025; 17:00	3× (suspension)	Report	2× (suspension)	Sporthalle an der Ulmenallee, Blomberg; Attendance: 880; Referees: Bosnjak, Maric (BIH)

16 November 2025; 18:00	**Valur (Iceland)**	**22–22**	**(Germany) HSG Blomberg-Lippe**	N1 höllin, Reykjavík; Attendance: 382; Referees: Nygaard, Primdahl (DEN)
16 November 2025; 18:00	Sturludóttir 6	(10–14)	Vegué 5	N1 höllin, Reykjavík; Attendance: 382; Referees: Nygaard, Primdahl (DEN)
16 November 2025; 18:00	1× (suspension)	Report	2× (suspension)	N1 höllin, Reykjavík; Attendance: 382; Referees: Nygaard, Primdahl (DEN)

HSG Blomberg-Lippe won 59–46 on aggregate.

15 November 2025; 14:00	**RK Lokomotiva Zagreb (Croatia)**	**28–22**	**(Switzerland) GC Amicitia Zürich**	High School Jelkovec, Zagreb; Attendance: 512; Referees: Riello, Panetta (ITA)
15 November 2025; 14:00	Posavec 9	(14–7)	Aellen 6	High School Jelkovec, Zagreb; Attendance: 512; Referees: Riello, Panetta (ITA)
15 November 2025; 14:00	4× (suspension)	Report	1× (yellow card) 4× (suspension)	High School Jelkovec, Zagreb; Attendance: 512; Referees: Riello, Panetta (ITA)

16 November 2025; 12:00	**GC Amicitia Zürich (Switzerland)**	**25–26**	**(Croatia) RK Lokomotiva Zagreb**	High School Jelkovec, Zagreb; Attendance: 312; Referees: Riello, Panetta (ITA)
16 November 2025; 12:00	Erni 8	(11–15)	Posavec 8	High School Jelkovec, Zagreb; Attendance: 312; Referees: Riello, Panetta (ITA)
16 November 2025; 12:00	1× (yellow card) 3× (suspension)	Report	1× (yellow card) 2× (suspension)	High School Jelkovec, Zagreb; Attendance: 312; Referees: Riello, Panetta (ITA)

RK Lokomotiva Zagreb won 54–47 on aggregate.

8 November 2025; 16:00	**HH Elite (Denmark)**	**27–21**	**(Romania) CS Minaur Baia Mare**	Forum Horsens, Horsens; Attendance: 1,133; Referees: Puksic, Satler (SLO)
8 November 2025; 16:00	Neesgaard, Pálsdóttir Nólsoy 6	(15–13)	Ilyina 7	Forum Horsens, Horsens; Attendance: 1,133; Referees: Puksic, Satler (SLO)
8 November 2025; 16:00	2× (suspension)	Report	1× (yellow card) 3× (suspension)	Forum Horsens, Horsens; Attendance: 1,133; Referees: Puksic, Satler (SLO)

16 November 2025; 17:00	**CS Minaur Baia Mare (Romania)**	**33–22**	**(Denmark) HH Elite**	Sala Polivalenta Lascar Pana, Baia Mare; Attendance: 1,250; Referees: Klompers, Stobbe (NED)
16 November 2025; 17:00	Quintino, Woller 7	(19–12)	Maarschalkeweerd, Rasmussen 6	Sala Polivalenta Lascar Pana, Baia Mare; Attendance: 1,250; Referees: Klompers, Stobbe (NED)
16 November 2025; 17:00	1× (yellow card) 3× (suspension)	Report	2× (suspension)	Sala Polivalenta Lascar Pana, Baia Mare; Attendance: 1,250; Referees: Klompers, Stobbe (NED)

CS Minaur Baia Mare won 54–49 on aggregate.

14 November 2025; 19:00	**Vfl Oldenburg (Germany)**	**36–14**	**(Croatia) HC Dalmatinka Ploče**	EWE Arena, Oldenburg; Attendance: 1,085; Referees: Cournil, Lamour (FRA)
14 November 2025; 19:00	Martens 9	(14–8)	three players 3	EWE Arena, Oldenburg; Attendance: 1,085; Referees: Cournil, Lamour (FRA)
14 November 2025; 19:00	3× (suspension)	Report	4× (suspension)	EWE Arena, Oldenburg; Attendance: 1,085; Referees: Cournil, Lamour (FRA)

16 November 2025; 16:30	**HC Dalmatinka Ploče (Croatia)**	**21–39**	**(Germany) Vfl Oldenburg**	EWE Arena, Oldenburg; Attendance: 1,124; Referees: Cournil, Lamour (FRA)
16 November 2025; 16:30	Bule 8	(11–19)	three players 6	EWE Arena, Oldenburg; Attendance: 1,124; Referees: Cournil, Lamour (FRA)
16 November 2025; 16:30	1× (yellow card) 3× (suspension)	Report	2× (yellow card) 3× (suspension)	EWE Arena, Oldenburg; Attendance: 1,124; Referees: Cournil, Lamour (FRA)

Vfl Oldenburg won 75–35 on aggregate.

== See also ==
- 2025–26 EHF Champions League
- 2025–26 EHF European League
- 2025–26 EHF European Cup
- 2025–26 Women's EHF Champions League
- 2025–26 Women's EHF European League
- 2025–26 Women's EHF European Cup
