= 2025–26 Women's EHF European League =

European handball tournament

Women's EHF European League
- 2025–26
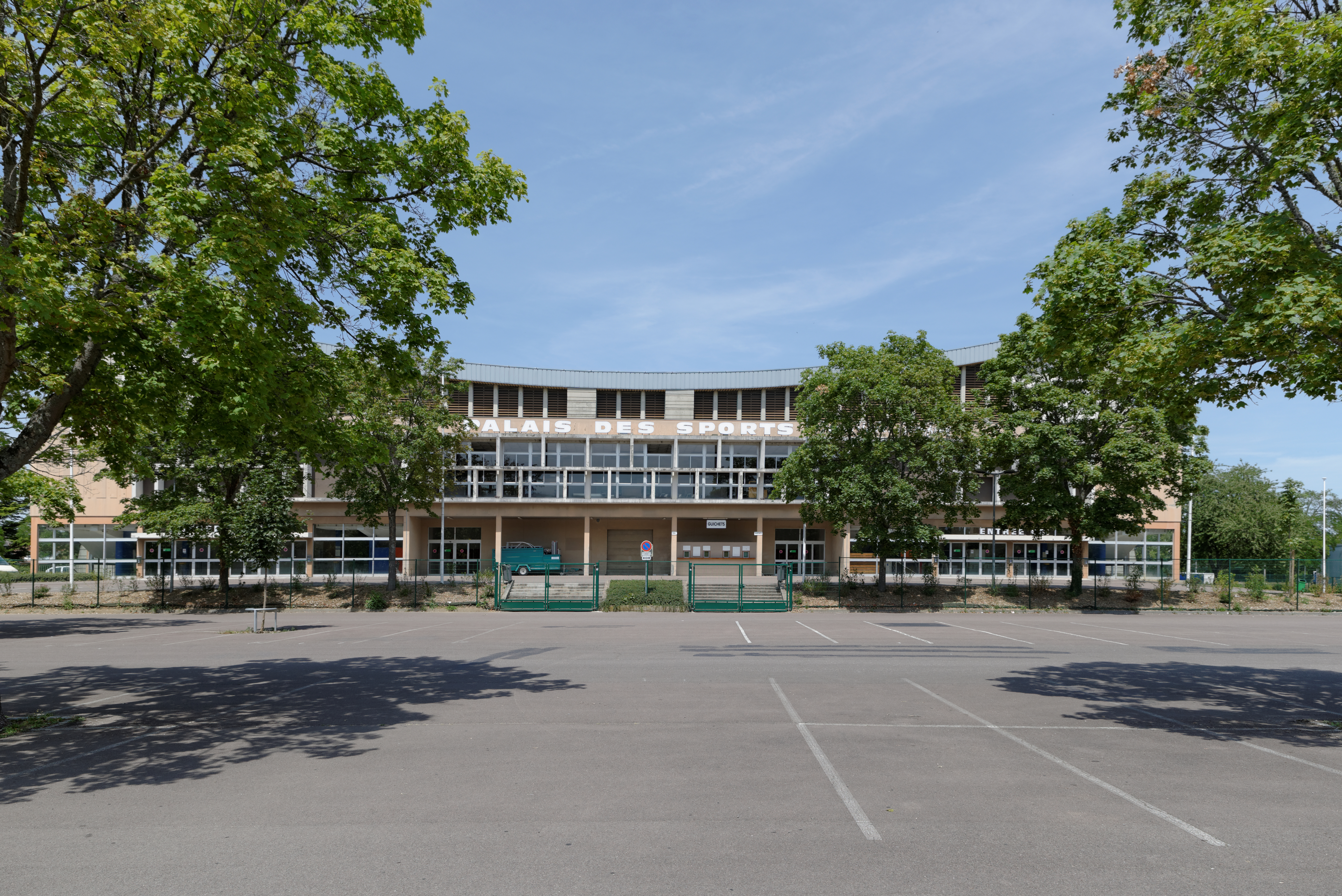
- The final four will be held at the Palais des sports Jean-Michel-Geoffroy in Dijon.

Tournament information
- Sport: Handball
- Dates: 27 September 2025–17 May 2026
- Teams: Competition proper: 16; Total: 36 (from 20 countries)
- Website: ehfel.com

Final positions
- Champions: (France) JDA Bourgogne Dijon HB (1st title)
- Runner-up: (Germany) Thüringer HC

Tournament statistics
- MVP: (Slovakia) Adriána Holejová
- Top scorer: (Austria) Johanna Reichert (111 goals)

The 2025–25 Women's EHF European League is the 45th edition of EHF's second-tier women's handball competition, running from 27 September 2025 to 17 May 2026.

Thüringer HC are the defending champions. JDA Bourgogne Dijon HB won their first title after beating Thüringer HC in the final 29–25 at home.

== Rankings ==
The rankings are based on the performances of each club from a respective country from a three-year period.

- Associations 1–2 can have four clubs qualify.
- Associations 3–9 can have three clubs qualify.
- Associations 10–18 can have two clubs qualify.
- Associations 19–29 can have one club qualify.
- Associations below the top 30 can't participate in this competition.

Rank	Association	Average points	Teams
1	Denmark	96.00	3
2	Germany	94.67	4
3	Norway	85.67	3
4	Romania	81.67	3
5	France	64.00	3
6	Hungary	48.67	2
7	Croatia	38.67	2
8	Russia	44.50	0
9	Poland	27.33	2
10	Spain	21.00	1
11	Sweden	13.33	2
12	Switzerland	9.67	3
13	Serbia	9.67	1
14	Czech Republic	6.33	1
15	Turkey	5.33	1
16	Austria	2.33	1

Rank	Association	Average points	Teams
17	Greece	0.67	1
18	Iceland	0.67	1
19	Azerbaijan	0.00	0
19	Cyprus	0.00	0
19	Finland	0.00	0
19	Israel	0.00	0
19	Italy	0.00	0
19	Kosovo	0.00	0
19	Luxembourg	0.00	0
19	North Macedonia	0.00	0
19	Netherlands	0.00	1
19	Portugal	0.00	1
19	Ukraine	0.00	0
30	(N/A) Everyone else	0.00	0

== Qualified teams ==
The labels in the parentheses show how each team qualified for the place of its starting round:

- EL: European League title holders
- EC: European Cup title holders
- CW: Cup winners
- CR: Cup runners-up
- 4th, 5th, etc.: League position of the previous season

The list of entered teams was announced on 15 July 2025. Sola HK was originally among the four clubs directly qualified for the group phase of the EHF European League Women 2025/26, but EHF's decision on Tuesday 5 August announced Sola HK as the replacement for HB Ludwigsburg in group B of the 2025–26 Women's EHF Champions League, leaving a spot open in the seeding list for the EHF European League. Tertnes Bergen, a Norwegian club seeded initially in the qualification round 3, has been upgraded to the group phase.

=== Team allocation ===
Group stage
(Denmark) Nykøbing Falster Håndboldklub (4th)	(Germany) Thüringer HC (3rd)	(Norway) Tertnes Bergen (5th)	(Romania) CS Corona Brașov (2nd)
Round 3
(Croatia) RK Lokomotiva Zagreb (2nd)	(Croatia) HC Dalmatinka Ploče (3rd)	(Denmark) Viborg HK (6th)	(France) JDA Bourgogne Dijon HB (3rd)
(France) Chambray Touraine Handball (4th)	(Germany) HSG Blomberg-Lippe (3rd)	(Germany) HSG Bensheim/Auerbach (5th)	(Germany) Vfl Oldenburg (6th)
(Hungary) MOL Esztergom (3rd)	(Norway) Larvik HK (3rd)	(Poland) KGHM MKS Zagłębie Lubin (1st)	(Poland) PGE MKS El-Volt Lublin (2nd)
(Romania) CS Minaur Baia Mare (4th)	(Spain) Super Amara Bera Bera (1st)		
Round 2
(Austria) Hypo Niederösterreich (1st)	(Czech Republic) DHK Baník Most (1st)	(Denmark) HH Elite (7th)	(France) ESBF Besançon (5th)
(Greece) OF Nea Ionia (1st)	(Hungary) Mosonmagyaróvári KC SE (5th)	(Iceland) Valur (1st)	(Netherlands) JuRo Unirek VZV (1st)
(Norway) Molde Elite (4th)	(Portugal) SL Benfica (1st)	(Romania) CS Rapid București (5th)	(Serbia) ŽRK Crvena zvezda (1st)
(Sweden) IK Sävehof (1st)	(Sweden) Skara HF (6th)	(Switzerland) LC Brühl Handball (1st)	(Switzerland) Spono Eagles (2nd)
(Switzerland) GC Amicitia Zürich (3rd)	(Turkey) Armada Praxis Yalikavakspor (1st)		

== Round and draw dates ==
The schedule of the competition was as follows (all draws were held at the EHF headquarters in Vienna, Austria).

Phase	Round	Draw date	First leg	Second leg
Qualification	Second qualifying round	15 July 2025	27–28 September 2025	4–5 October 2025
Qualification	Third qualifying round	15 July 2025	8–9 November 2025	15–16 November 2025
Group stage	Matchday 1	20 November 2025	10–11 January 2026	
Group stage	Matchday 2	20 November 2025	17–18 January 2026	
Group stage	Matchday 3	20 November 2025	24–25 January 2026	
Group stage	Matchday 4	20 November 2025	7–8 February 2026	
Group stage	Matchday 5	20 November 2025	14–15 February 2026	
Group stage	Matchday 6	20 November 2025	21–22 February 2026	
Knockout phase	Quarter-finals	no draw	21–22 March 2026	28–29 March 2026
Knockout phase	Semi finals	7 April 2026	16 May 2026	
Knockout phase	Final	no draw	17 May 2026	

== Qualification round ==
=== Round 2 ===
There were 18 teams participating in round 2. The first legs were played on 27–28 September and the second legs were played on 4–5 October 2025.

Team 1	Agg.	Team 2	1st leg	2nd leg
Molde Elite (Norway)	53–51	(Sweden) Skara HF	27–24	26–27
Armada Praxis Yalikavakspor (Turkey)	48–64	(Denmark) HH Elite	25–24	23–40
Motherson Mosonmagyaróvár (Note: Directly advanced to the group phase) (Hungary)	63–36	(Greece) O.F.N. Ionia	31–17	32–19
Spono Eagles (Switzerland)	47–66	(Serbia) ŽRK Crvena zvezda	23–37	24–29
Hypo Niederösterreich (Austria)	43–62	(Romania) CS Rapid București	24–32	19–30
LC Brühl Handball (Switzerland)	53–61	(Switzerland) GC Amicitia Zürich	23–36	30–25
IK Sävehof (Sweden)	58–55	(Portugal) SL Benfica	29–28	29–27
ESBF Besançon (France)	64–57	(Czech Republic) DHK Baník Most	34–28	30–29
JuRo Unirek VZV (Netherlands)	56–61	(Iceland) Valur	30–31	26–30

=== Round 3 ===
There were 22 teams participating in round 3. The first legs were played on 8–9 November and the second legs were played on 15–16 November 2025.

Team 1	Agg.	Team 2	1st leg	2nd leg
PGE MKS El-Volt Lublin (Poland)	54–64	(Poland) KGHM MKS Zagłębie Lubin	24–29	30–35
Super Amara Bera Bera (Spain)	46–49	(France) JDA Bourgogne Dijon HB	22–19	24–30 ET
MOL Esztergom (Hungary)	56–52	(Serbia) ŽRK Crvena zvezda	29–28	27–24
IK Sävehof (Sweden)	61–70	(Denmark) Viborg HK	31–31	30–39
Motherson Mosonmagyaróvár (Hungary)	(Note: After Tertnes Bergen was given a spot in the group stage, this tie was cancelled and both teams advanced to the group stage.)	(Norway) Tertnes Bergen	–	–
Chambray Touraine Handball (France)	57–46	(France) ESBF Besançon	29–25	28–21
Larvik HK (Norway)	66–56	(Norway) Molde Elite	34–23	32–33
CS Rapid București (Romania)	60–55	(Germany) HSG Bensheim/Auerbach	28–34	32–21
HSG Blomberg-Lippe (Germany)	59–46	(Iceland) Valur	37–24	22–22
RK Lokomotiva Zagreb (Croatia)	54–47	(Switzerland) GC Amicitia Zürich	28–22	26–25
HH Elite (Denmark)	49–54	(Romania) CS Minaur Baia Mare	27–21	22–33
Vfl Oldenburg (Germany)	75–35	(Croatia) HC Dalmatinka Ploče	36–14	39–21

== Group stage ==
Location of teams of the 2025–26 Women's EHF European League group stage.
Red: Group A; Blue: Group B; Yellow: Group C; Green: Group D.

The draw for the group phase was held on 20 November 2025. In each group, teams played against each other in a double round-robin format, with home and away matches.

In the group stage, teams were ranked according to points (2 points for a win, 1 point for a draw, 0 points for a loss). After completion of the group stage, if two or more teams have scored the same number of points, the ranking will be determined as follows:

1. Highest number of points in matches between the teams directly involved;
2. Superior goal difference in matches between the teams directly involved;
3. Highest number of goals scored in matches between the teams directly involved;
4. Superior goal difference in all matches of the group;
5. Highest number of plus goals in all matches of the group;

=== Group A ===
Pos	Team	Pld	W	D	L	GF	GA	GD	Pts	Qualification	THÜ	MOS	MIN	LAR
1	(Germany) Thüringer HC	6	4	0	2	195	181	+14	8 (Note: Thüringer HC 68–60 Motherson Mosonmagyaróvár)	Quarterfinals	—	34–24	33–32	36–33
2	(Hungary) Motherson Mosonmagyaróvár	6	4	0	2	174	176	−2	8	Quarterfinals	36–34	—	28–26	31–22
3	(Romania) CS Minaur Baia Mare	6	3	0	3	176	170	+6	6		28–24	34–28	—	28–31
4	(Norway) Larvik HK	6	1	0	5	166	184	−18	2		28–34	26–27	26–28	—

Source: EHF

=== Group B ===
Pos	Team	Pld	W	D	L	GF	GA	GD	Pts	Qualification	ESZ	NYK	BLO	CHA
1	(Hungary) MOL Esztergom	6	4	1	1	181	174	+7	9	Quarterfinals	—	30–25	33–32	24–22
2	(Denmark) Nykøbing Falster Håndboldklub	6	2	3	1	167	163	+4	7	Quarterfinals	34–32	—	30–30	21–21
3	(Germany) HSG Blomberg-Lippe	6	1	2	3	171	176	−5	4 (Note: HSG Blomberg-Lippe 56–53 Chambray Touraine Handball)		31–31	22–29	—	25–26
4	(France) Chambray Touraine Handball	6	1	2	3	154	160	−6	4		30–31	28–28	27–31	—

Source: EHF

=== Group C ===
Pos	Team	Pld	W	D	L	GF	GA	GD	Pts	Qualification	BUC	ZAG	BRG	OLD
1	(Romania) CS Rapid București	6	3	2	1	182	170	+12	8	Quarterfinals	—	24–29	32–32	34–30
2	(Croatia) RK Lokomotiva Zagreb	6	3	1	2	167	160	+7	7	Quarterfinals	28–28	—	26–29	28–29
3	(Norway) Tertnes Bergen	6	2	1	3	177	180	−3	5		28–30	26–29	—	26–31
4	(Germany) VfL Oldenburg	6	2	0	4	169	185	−16	4		23–34	24–27	32–36	—

Source: EHF

=== Group D ===
Pos	Team	Pld	W	D	L	GF	GA	GD	Pts	Qualification	DIJ	VIB	BRA	LUB
1	(France) JDA Bourgogne Dijon HB	6	4	1	1	191	175	+16	9	Quarterfinals	—	30–30	26–30	31–26
2	(Denmark) Viborg HK	6	3	2	1	203	188	+15	8	Quarterfinals	32–33	—	33–33	42–38
3	(Romania) CS Corona Brașov	6	3	1	2	193	189	+4	7		30–35	28–34	—	33–30
4	(Poland) KGHM MKS Zagłębie Lubin	6	0	0	6	178	213	−35	0		27–36	26–32	31–39	—

Source: EHF

== Quarterfinals ==
Team 1	Agg.	Team 2	1st leg	2nd leg
Nykøbing Falster Håndboldklub (Denmark)	64–67	(Germany) Thüringer HC	27–31	37–36
Motherson Mosonmagyaróvár (Hungary)	52–68	(Hungary) MOL Esztergom	25–36	27–32
Viborg HK (Denmark)	61–58	(Romania) CS Rapid București	35–26	26–32
RK Lokomotiva Zagreb (Croatia)	40–58	(France) JDA Bourgogne Dijon HB	20–30	20–28

=== Matches ===
22 March 2026; 18:00	Nykøbing Falster Håndboldklub (Denmark)	27–31	(Germany) Thüringer HC	SPAR NORD Boxen, Nykøbing; Attendance: 1,794; Referees: Ilievski, Ilievski (MKD)
22 March 2026; 18:00	Bang 7	(14–13)	Reichert 12	SPAR NORD Boxen, Nykøbing; Attendance: 1,794; Referees: Ilievski, Ilievski (MKD)
22 March 2026; 18:00	4× (suspension)	Report	3× (suspension)	SPAR NORD Boxen, Nykøbing; Attendance: 1,794; Referees: Ilievski, Ilievski (MKD)

29 March 2026; 18:00	Thüringer HC (Germany)	36–37	(Denmark) Nykøbing Falster Håndboldklub	Salza-Halle. Bad Langensalza; Attendance: 1,500; Referees: Ivanović, Kaluđerović (MNE)
29 March 2026; 18:00	Reichert 15	(18–22)	Lerby 11	Salza-Halle. Bad Langensalza; Attendance: 1,500; Referees: Ivanović, Kaluđerović (MNE)
29 March 2026; 18:00	1× (yellow card) 3× (suspension)	Report	3× (suspension)	Salza-Halle. Bad Langensalza; Attendance: 1,500; Referees: Ivanović, Kaluđerović (MNE)

Thüringer HC won 67–64 on aggregate

21 March 2026; 20:00	Motherson Mosonmagyaróvár (Hungary)	25–36	(Hungary) MOL Esztergom	UFM Aréna, Mosonmagyaróvár; Attendance: 922; Referees: Cazan, Suliman (ROU)
21 March 2026; 20:00	Stranigg 7	(13–19)	Faragó 12	UFM Aréna, Mosonmagyaróvár; Attendance: 922; Referees: Cazan, Suliman (ROU)
21 March 2026; 20:00	3× (suspension)	Report	2× (yellow card) 4× (suspension)	UFM Aréna, Mosonmagyaróvár; Attendance: 922; Referees: Cazan, Suliman (ROU)

29 March 2026; 14:00	MOL Esztergom (Hungary)	32–27	(Hungary) Motherson Mosonmagyaróvár	Suzuki Aréna, Esztergom; Attendance: 950; Referees: Jakovljević, Kovačević (SRB)
29 March 2026; 14:00	Jacques 7	(18–13)	Tóth 10	Suzuki Aréna, Esztergom; Attendance: 950; Referees: Jakovljević, Kovačević (SRB)
29 March 2026; 14:00	4× (suspension)	Report	1× (suspension)	Suzuki Aréna, Esztergom; Attendance: 950; Referees: Jakovljević, Kovačević (SRB)

MOL Esztergom won 68–52 on aggregate

21 March 2026; 18:00	Viborg HK (Denmark)	35–26	(Romania) CS Rapid București	BioCirc Arena, Viborg; Attendance: 688; Referees: Cournil, Lamour (FRA)
21 March 2026; 18:00	Martinsen 9	(19–14)	four players 4	BioCirc Arena, Viborg; Attendance: 688; Referees: Cournil, Lamour (FRA)
21 March 2026; 18:00	2× (yellow card) 2× (suspension)	Report	5× (suspension)	BioCirc Arena, Viborg; Attendance: 688; Referees: Cournil, Lamour (FRA)

28 March 2026; 17:00	CS Rapid București (Romania)	32–26	(Denmark) Viborg HK	Polyvalent Hall, București; Attendance: 2,500; Referees: Kinnari, Skogberg (FIN)
28 March 2026; 17:00	Kassoma 10	(13–11)	Schmidt	Polyvalent Hall, București; Attendance: 2,500; Referees: Kinnari, Skogberg (FIN)
28 March 2026; 17:00	2× (yellow card) 3× (suspension)	Report	1× (yellow card) 4× (suspension)	Polyvalent Hall, București; Attendance: 2,500; Referees: Kinnari, Skogberg (FIN)

Viborg HK won 61–58 on aggregate

22 March 2026; 14:00	RK Lokomotiva Zagreb (Croatia)	20–30	(France) JDA Bourgogne Dijon HB	Sutinska Vrela, Zagreb; Attendance: 400; Referees: Maia, Nunes (POR)
22 March 2026; 14:00	Posavec 10	(9–16)	Lønborg 13	Sutinska Vrela, Zagreb; Attendance: 400; Referees: Maia, Nunes (POR)
22 March 2026; 14:00	1× (yellow card) 7× (suspension) 1× (red card)	Report	6× (suspension)	Sutinska Vrela, Zagreb; Attendance: 400; Referees: Maia, Nunes (POR)

28 March 2026; 20:00	JDA Bourgogne Dijon HB (France)	28–20	(Croatia) RK Lokomotiva Zagreb	Palais des sports Jean-Michel-Geoffroy, Dijon; Attendance: 1,700; Referees: Murariu, Chiruță (ROU)
28 March 2026; 20:00	Lønborg 7	(12–13)	Tabak 7	Palais des sports Jean-Michel-Geoffroy, Dijon; Attendance: 1,700; Referees: Murariu, Chiruță (ROU)
28 March 2026; 20:00	6× (suspension)	Report	3× (suspension)	Palais des sports Jean-Michel-Geoffroy, Dijon; Attendance: 1,700; Referees: Murariu, Chiruță (ROU)

JDA Bourgogne Dijon HB won 58–40 on aggregate

== Final Four ==
After after holding the tournament in Graz, Austria for three years, the EHF decided to end holding it in a neutral venue and opened the bidding process on 25 February 2026. On 2 April 2026, the EHF announced that Dijon was the awarded the hosting rights for the Final Four, (also known as the EHF Finals by the EHF). On 10 April 2026, ticket sales started. On 30 April 2026, the referees were confirmed.

=== Draw ===
The draw was held on 7 April 2026.

=== Bracket ===
Semifinals
16 May
(Germany) Thüringer HC	26
(Denmark) Viborg HK	24
16 May
(France) JDA Bourgogne Dijon HB	33
(Hungary) MOL Esztergom	30

Final
17 May
(Germany) Thüringer HC	25
(France) JDA Bourgogne Dijon HB	29
Third place
17 May
(Denmark) Viborg HK	35
(Hungary) MOL Esztergom	30

=== Semifinals ===
16 May 2026; 15:00	Thüringer HC (Germany)	26–24	(Denmark) Viborg HK	Palais des sports Jean-Michel-Geoffroy, Dijon; Attendance: 2,550; Referees: Pavicevic, Martinovic (MNE)
16 May 2026; 15:00	Reichert, Hanfland 5	(11–10)	Søndergaard 5	Palais des sports Jean-Michel-Geoffroy, Dijon; Attendance: 2,550; Referees: Pavicevic, Martinovic (MNE)
16 May 2026; 15:00	1× (yellow card) 6× (suspension)	Report	3× (suspension)	Palais des sports Jean-Michel-Geoffroy, Dijon; Attendance: 2,550; Referees: Pavicevic, Martinovic (MNE)

16 May 2026; 18:00	JDA Bourgogne Dijon (France)	33–30	(Hungary) MOL Esztergom	Palais des sports Jean-Michel-Geoffroy, Dijon; Attendance: 3,480; Referees: Stancu (ROU), Pepe ( ITA)
16 May 2026; 18:00	Holejová 10	(15–13)	Faragó 7	Palais des sports Jean-Michel-Geoffroy, Dijon; Attendance: 3,480; Referees: Stancu (ROU), Pepe ( ITA)
16 May 2026; 18:00	4× (suspension)	Report	1× (yellow card) 5× (suspension)	Palais des sports Jean-Michel-Geoffroy, Dijon; Attendance: 3,480; Referees: Stancu (ROU), Pepe ( ITA)

=== Third place game ===
17 May 2025; 15:00	Viborg HK (Denmark)	35–30	(Hungary) MOL Esztergom	Palais des sports Jean-Michel-Geoffroy, Dijon; Attendance: 3,420; Referees: Dasic, Husomanovic (NOR)
17 May 2025; 15:00	Hald 12	(19–13)	Ballai 8	Palais des sports Jean-Michel-Geoffroy, Dijon; Attendance: 3,420; Referees: Dasic, Husomanovic (NOR)
17 May 2025; 15:00	3× (suspension)	Report	1× (yellow card) 3× (suspension)	Palais des sports Jean-Michel-Geoffroy, Dijon; Attendance: 3,420; Referees: Dasic, Husomanovic (NOR)

=== Final ===
17 May 2025; 18:00	Thüringer HC (Germany)	25–29	(France) JDA Bourgogne Dijon	Palais des sports Jean-Michel-Geoffroy, Dijon; Attendance: 3,500; Referees: Lidacka, Lesiak (POL)
17 May 2025; 18:00	Reichert 8	(15–6)	Dury 9	Palais des sports Jean-Michel-Geoffroy, Dijon; Attendance: 3,500; Referees: Lidacka, Lesiak (POL)
17 May 2025; 18:00	2× (yellow card) 3× (suspension)	Report	1× (yellow card) 4× (suspension)	Palais des sports Jean-Michel-Geoffroy, Dijon; Attendance: 3,500; Referees: Lidacka, Lesiak (POL)

== Top goalscorers ==
Rank	Player	Club	Goals
1	(Austria) Johanna Reichert	(Germany) Thüringer HC	111
2	(Hungary) Lea Faragó	(Hungary) MOL Esztergom	62
3	(Denmark) Stine Nørklit Lønborg	(France) JDA Bourgogne Dijon HB	61
4	(Sweden) Clara Lerby	(Denmark) Nykøbing Falster Håndboldklub	54
5	(Norway) Marielle Martinsen	(Denmark) Viborg HK	52
6	(Serbia) Katarina Krpež Šlezak	(Romania) CS Corona Brașov	49
7	(Denmark) Sara Hald	(Denmark) Viborg HK	46
8	(Hungary) Anett Kovács	(Hungary) MOL Esztergom	44
8	(Croatia) Paula Posavec	(Croatia) RK Lokomotiva Zagreb	44
10	(Denmark) Clara Bang	(Denmark) Nykøbing Falster Håndboldklub	42
10	(France) Nina Drury	(France) JDA Bourgogne Dijon HB	42
10	(Hungary) Emília Varga	(Hungary) MOL Esztergom	42

== See also ==
- 2025–26 EHF Champions League
- 2025–26 EHF European League
- 2025–26 EHF European Cup
- 2025–26 Women's EHF Champions League
- 2025–26 Women's EHF European Cup
