= Adriána Holejová =

Slovak handball player (born 1992)

Personal information
- Born: 11 February 1999 (age 27) Michalovce, Slovakia
- Height: 1.71 m (5 ft 7 in)

Sport
- Sport: Handball
- Position: Playmaker
- Current club: JDA Dijon
- Number: 19

Senior clubs
- Years: Team
- 2015–2022: IUVENTA Michalovce
- 2022–2025: OGC Nice
- 2025–: JDA Dijon
National team
- Years: Team
- 2020–: Slovakia

Adriána Holejová (born 11 February 1999) is a Slovak handballer who plays for French club JDA Dijon and the Slovak national team.

== Achievements ==
- EHF European League:
  - Winner: 2026

== Individual awards ==
- EHF European League Final Four MVP: 2026
- Slovak Handballer of the Year: 2024
