= Déborah Lassource =

French handball player (born 1999)

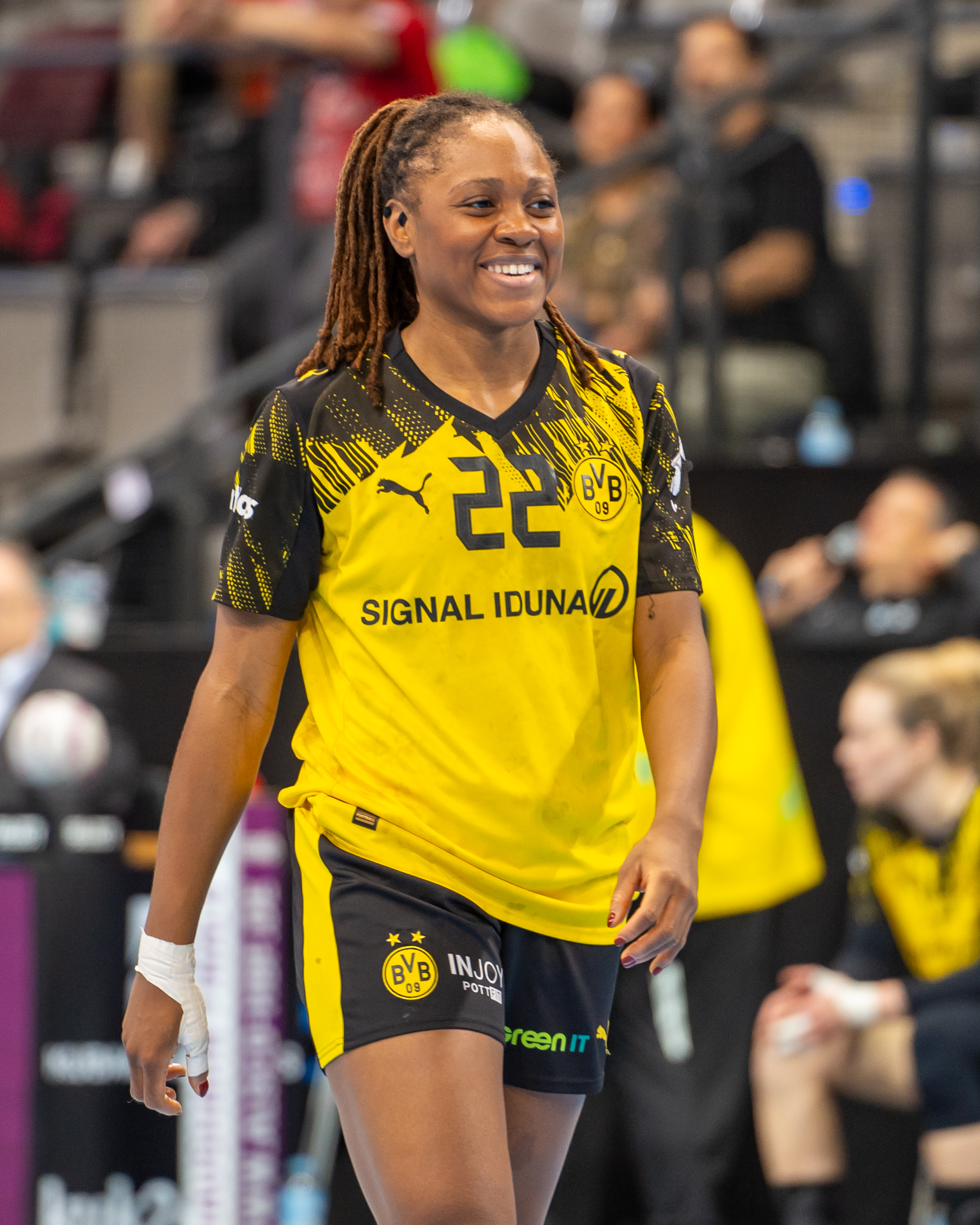
- Deborah Lassource in 2026

Personal information
- Nationality: French
- Born: 29 September 1999 (age 27) Maisons-Laffitte, France
- Height: 1.76 m (5 ft 9 in)

Sport
- Sport: Handball
- Position: Left back / Centre back
- Current club: Jeanne d'Arc Dijon
- Number: 20

Youth career
- Years: Team
- –2015: Issy Paris Hand

Senior clubs
- Years: Team
- 2015–2024: Issy Paris Hand / Paris 92
- 2024–2026: Borussia Dortmund
- 2026–: Jeanne d'Arc Dijon
National team
Years	Team	Apps	(Gls)
2022–	France	43	(37)
Medal record
World Championship
Gold medal – first place	2023 Denmark/Norway/Sweden
- Updated on 25 October 2025

Déborah Lassource (born 29 September 1999) is a French female handballer for Jeanne d'Arc Dijon and the French national team as a left back and centre back.

== Career ==
Déborah Lassource started her career at Issy Paris Hand / Paris 92, where she played from 2015 until 2024 and was the captain. In 2024 she joined German side Borussia Dortmund Handball.

=== National team ===
In 2017 she won the youth World Championship with the French team.

She represented France at the 2022 European Women's Handball Championship in Slovenia, Montenegro and North Macedonia.

At the 2023 World Championship she won gold medals with the French team.

== Private ==
She is the younger sister of Coralie Lassource, who plays for Brest Bretagne Handball. They used to play together at Issy Paris Hand. Their mother also used to play handball.

== Honours ==
=== Club ===
==== Domestic ====
- French league (Division 1 Féminine):
  - 3rd: 2016, 2017, 2022 (with Issy Paris Hand / Paris 92)
- French Cup (Coupe de France):
  - Runner up: 2017 (with Issy Paris Hand)

=== National team ===
- European Championship
  - 2022: 4th
- World Championship:
  - 2023: Gold
- European Women's U-19 Handball Championship
  - 2017: Gold
