= Anne-Emmanuelle Augustine =

French handball player (born 2001)

Personal information
- Full name: Anne-Emmanuelle Gaëlle Augustine
- Nationality: French
- Born: 10 July 2001 (age 25) Fort-de-France, Martinique
- Height: 1.80 m (5 ft 11 in)

Sport
- Sport: Handball
- Position: Line player
- Current club: OGC Nice Côte d'Azur Handball
- Number: 15

Youth career
- Years: Team
- 2019–2022: Metz Handball

Senior clubs
- Years: Team
- 2022–2024: OGC Nice Côte d'Azur Handball
- 2024–: Metz Handball

Anne-Emmanuelle Augustine (born 10 July 2001) is a French professional handballer for OGC Nice Côte d'Azur Handball in the LFH Division 1 Féminine.

In January 2024, she signed a two-year contract with French powerhouse Metz Handball for the 2024/25 season.

== Career ==
Augustine started her youth years on a training center at Metz Handball in 2019. Throughout the 2021/21 season, she made various appearances in the 2021-22 Women's EHF Champions League on the line player position. Augustine was even part of the extended squad at 2021–22 Women's EHF Champions League final four in Budapest, winning a bronze medal.

However, she signed her first professional contract with fellow French top tier OGC Nice Côte d'Azur Handball for two seasons. For the summer of 2024, she will return and pair up with French international Sarah Bouktit.

== Achievements ==
- French Women's First League Championship:
  - Winner: 2022
- French Women's Cup Championship:
  - Winner: 2022
- Women's EHF Champions League:
  - Gold medal: 2026
  - Bronze medal: 2022
