= Alba Spugnini =

Spanish handball player (born 2000)

Personal information
- Full name: Alba Chiara Spugnini Santome
- Nationality: Spanish
- Born: 30 June 2000 (age 26) Arona, Spain
- Height: 1.81 m (5 ft 11 in)

Sport
- Sport: Handball
- Position: Line player
- Current club: CS Minaur Baia Mare
- Number: 93

Senior clubs
- Years: Team
- 2017–2019: CB Tejina
- 2019–2023: BM Remudas
- 2023–: CS Minaur Baia Mare
National team
Years	Team	Apps	(Gls)
2022–	Spain	20	(24)
Medal record
Mediterranean Games
Gold medal – first place	2022 Oran	Team

Alba Spugnini (born 30 June 2000) is a Spanish female handballer for CS Minaur Baia Mare and the Spanish national team.

Aalla made her official debut on the Spanish national team on 30 June 2022, against Algeria. She also represented Spain at the 2022 European Women's Handball Championship in Slovenia, Montenegro and North Macedonia.

== Honours ==
=== Club ===
- EHF European Cup:
  - Winner: 2022
- Supercopa de España de Balonmano Femenino:
  - Winner: 2020

=== National team ===
- Mediterranean Games:
  - Gold Medalist: 2022
