= Simone Petersen =

Danish handball player (born 1997)

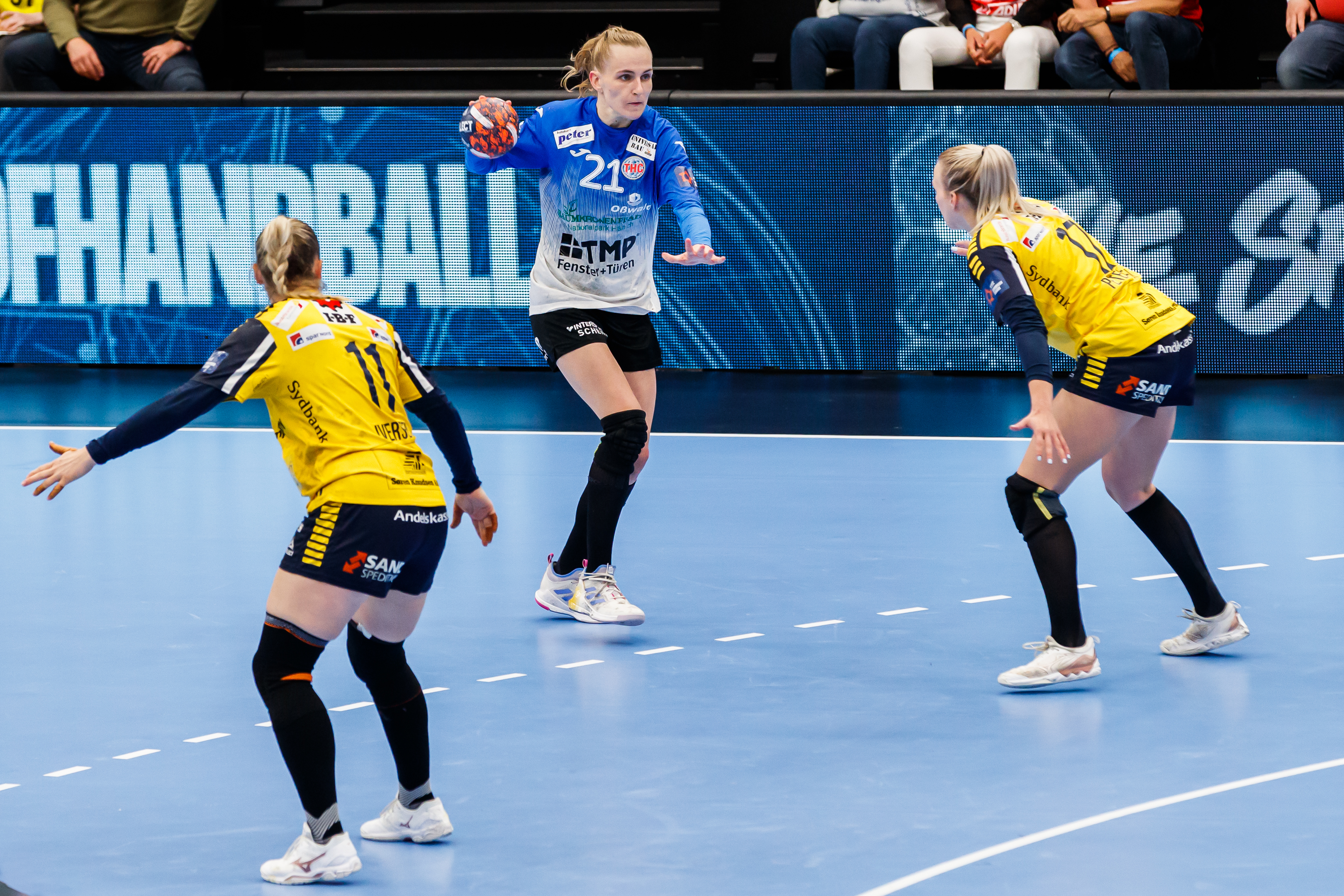
- Simone Petersen (left) for Ikast Håndbold in 2023

Personal information
- Full name: Simone Cathrine Petersen
- Nationality: Danish
- Born: 28 August 1997 (age 29) Ringsted, Denmark
- Height: 1.75 m (5 ft 9 in)

Sport
- Sport: Handball
- Position: Centre back
- Current club: Viborg HK
- Number: 8

Senior clubs
- Years: Team
- –: TMS Ringsted
- –: BK Ydun
- 2014–2017: FC Midtjylland Håndbold
- 2017–2019: Aarhus United
- 2019–2020: TuS Metzingen
- 2020–2025: Ikast Håndbold
- 2025–: Viborg HK
National team
Years	Team	Apps	(Gls)
2021–	Denmark	60	(93)
Medal record
World Championship
Bronze medal – third place	2021 Spain
Bronze medal – third place	2023 Denmark/Norway/Sweden
European Championship
Silver medal – second place	2022 Slovenia/North Macedonia/Montenegro
European Junior Championship
Gold medal – first place	2015 Spain
- Updated on 21 March 2026

Simone Cathrine Petersen (born 28 August 1997) is a Danish handball player for Viborg HK and the Danish national team.

== National team ==
She debuted for the Danish national team in 2021 against France. The same year she was at her first major tournament, the 2021 world cup in Spain where she won a bronze medal. A year later she won silver medals at the 2022 European Women's Handball Championship, losing to Norway in the final. At the 2023 World Championship she won another bronze medal with Denmark.

She missed the 2024 Olympics and 2024 European Championship due to injuries and was not selected for the 2025 World Championship.

== Career ==
Simone Petersen started playing handball in her hometown Ringsted at TMS Ringsted. While she was enrolled at Københavns Idrætsefterskole in Copenhagen she was on the youth team at BK Ydun.

When she returned to Jutland she joined FC Midtjylland Håndbold, where she debuted in the Danish league at the age of 17. The 14–15 season was especially a prolific season, where she won both the junior and senior Danish Cup and league, as well as the EHF Cup Winners' Cup and won the European Youth Championship with the Danish U-19 national team.

In 2017 she joined the recently created Aarhus United, where she quickly became one of the key players. In her first season at the club she won bronze medals in the Danish cup, beating her old club FC Midtjylland in the third place play-off.

In 2019 she joined the German Bundesliga side TuS Metzingen for a single season before returning to FC Midtjylland Håndbold. Here she won the 2022-23 EHF European League and got two bronze medals in the Danish league.

In the middle of the 2025-26 season she joined Viborg HK in search of more playing time.
