= Jeanne d'Arc Dijon Handball =

French handball club

Jeanne d'Arc Bourgogne Dijon Handball
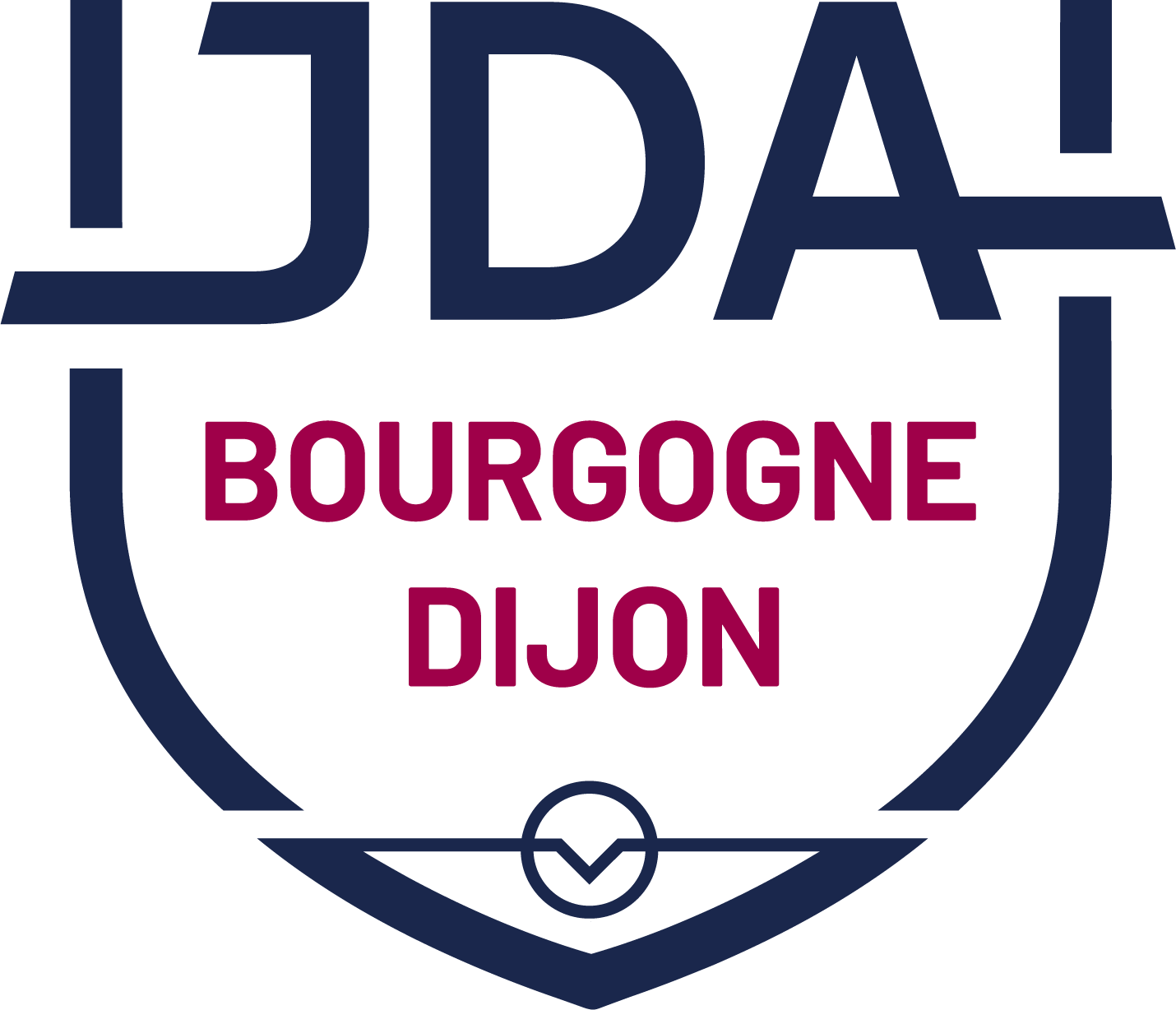
- Full name: Jeanne d'Arc Bourgogne Dijon Handball
- Short name: JDA
- Founded: 1996
- Arena: Palais des Sports de Dijon, Dijon
- Capacity: 3,100
- President: Thierry Degorce
- Head coach: Anthony Favier
- League: French Women's First League
- 2024–25: 3rd
- Club colours

Jeanne d'Arc Dijon Handball (also known as JDA Dijon Handball, formerly Cercle Dijon Bourgogne Handball) is a French handball club from Dijon, France. This team currently competes in the French Women's Handball First League from 2014 and they play their home matches in Palais des Sports de Dijon. Current head coach is Anthony Favier.

The club became in 2018, affiliated with the male basketball team JDA Dijon Basket and changed the official club name.

Summer 2022, both clubs changed their names again, adding "Bourgogne" to them. The club renamed itself to JDA Bourgogne Dijon Handball.

== Results ==
- French Women's First League Championship:
  - Third place (4): 1993, 2002, 2003, 2025
- Division 2 Féminine:
  - Winners (2): 1987, 2014
  - Runner-up (1): 1998
- Coupe de France:
  - Runner-up (3): 2002, 2007, 2013
- Coupe de la Ligue:
  - Runner-up (2): 2003, 2007
  - Semifinalist (1): 2008
- EHF European League / EHF Cup:
  - Winners: 2026
  - Silver Medalist: 1993
  - Bronze Medalist: 2025
  - Semifinalist: 1994
- Women's EHF Challenge Cup:
  - Silver Medalist: 2005

== Team ==
=== Current squad ===
Squad for the season 2025–26.

Goalkeepers

- 11 (Austria) Lena Ivančok
- 24 (France) Manuella Dos Reis

Wingers
LW

- 5 (France) Dorothée Blaise
- 21 (France) Nina Dury

RW

- 7 (France) Maureen Gayet
- 22 (Argentina) Rosario Urban

Line players

- 15 (France) Anne-Emmanuelle Augustine
- 31 (Denmark) Ida-Marie Dahl
- 25 (Spain) Sarah Valero Jodar

Back players
LB

- 4 (France) Claire Vautier
- 95 (France) Laura Fauvarque

CB

- 2 (Denmark) Stine Nørklit Lønborg
- 20 (France) Déborah Lassource

RB

- 93 (Norway) Celine Sivertsen
- 19 (Slovakia) Adriána Holejová

=== Transfers ===
Transfers for the 2026–27 season

Joining

- (France) Déborah Lassource (CB) (from (Germany) Borussia Dortmund Handball)
- (Austria) Lena Ivančok (GK) (from (Germany) Neckarsulmer SU)
- (France) Anne-Emmanuelle Augustine (LP) (from (France) Metz Handball)
- (Denmark) Ida-Marie Dahl (P) (from (Hungary) Győri ETO KC)

Leaving

- (Denmark) Nadia Mielke-Offendal (CB) (to (Denmark) HØJ Elite)
- (France) Lilou Pintat (PV) (to (France) Metz Handball)
- (France) Kenza Bouguerch (PV) (back from loan to (France) ASUL Handball)
- (France) Gnonsiane Niombla (CB) (retires)
- (Germany) Ann-Cathrin Giegerich (retires)

=== Technical staff ===
Staff for the 2024-25 season.

- (France) Head coach: Anthony Favier
- (France) Assistant coach: Jean-Raphaël Soupault
- (France) Physical coach: Pierre Terzi
- (France) Physical coach: Vianney Varanguin
- (France) Sporting director: Christophe Maréchal

== Personnel ==
- President :
  - Michel Amico (1994–2014)
  - Thierry Degorce (2018– )
- Vice-president : Clément Forgeneuf (?–?)
- Coach :
  - Christophe Maréchal (? –2019)
  - Christophe Mazel (2019–)
- Assistant coach :
  - Christophe Maréchal (? –2022)
  - Anthony Favier (2022–)
- Academy director : Anthony Favier
- Sporting director : Christophe Maréchal

== Notable former players ==
- (France) Béatrice Edwige
- (France) Marie Prouvensier
- (France) Florence Sauval
- (France) Myriame Saïd Mohamed
- (France) Veronique Pecqueux-Rolland
- (France) Stephanie Fiossonangaye
- (Tunisia) Ines Khouildi
- (Serbia) Dijana Stevin
- (Republic of the Congo) Jocelyne Mavoungou-Tsahout
- (Republic of the Congo) Gisele Donguet Nganga
- (Hungary) Kitti Hoffmann
- (Hungary) Ágnes Turtóczky
- (Slovakia) Veronika Pajtasová
- (Slovakia) Martina Skolková
- (Angola) Ilda Bengue
