= Nadia Mielke-Offendal =

Danish handball player (born 1994)

Nadia Offendal
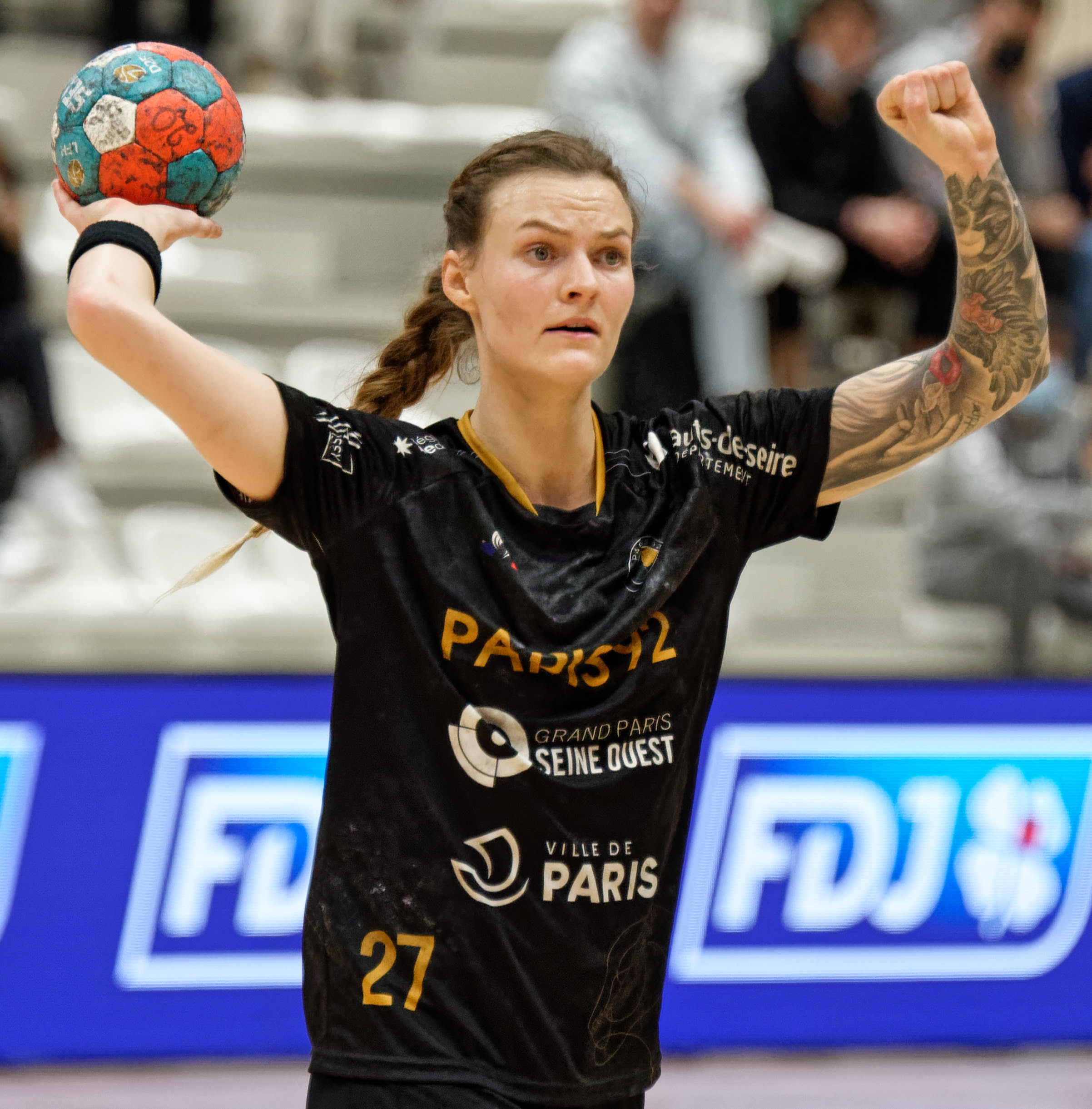
- Nadia Offendal (2022)

Personal information
- Full name: Nadia Offendal
- Nationality: Danish
- Born: 22 October 1994 (age 31) Greve, Denmark
- Height: 1.73 m (5 ft 8 in)

Sport
- Sport: Handball
- Position: Centre back
- Current club: JDA Dijon Handball
- Number: 27

Senior clubs
- Years: Team
- 2006–2013: HØJ Håndbold
- 2013–2020: Odense Håndbold
- 2020–2022: Paris 92
- 2022–2024: Chambray Touraine Handball
- 2024–: JDA Dijon Handball
National team
Years	Team	Apps	(Gls)
2014-	Denmark	20	(39)
Medal record
IHF Junior World Championship
Bronze medal – third place	2014 Croatia
IHF Youth World Championship
Gold medal – first place	2012 Montenegro
European Junior Championship
Bronze medal – third place	2013 Denmark
European Youth Championship
Silver medal – second place	2011 Czech Republic
- Updated on 22 July 2024

Nadia Offendal (born 22 October 1994) is a Danish handball player for French league club Jeanne d’Arc Dijon Handball and the Danish national team.

She participated at the 2018 European Women's Handball Championship.

== Achievements ==
- Damehåndboldligaen (Danish league):
  - Silver Medalist: 2018, 2020 (with Odense Håndbold)
  - Bronze Medalist: 2019 (with Odense Håndbold)
- Danish Cup:
  - Finalist: 2018, 2019 (with Odense Håndbold)
- Ligue Butagaz Énergie (French league):
  - 3rd: 2022 (with Paris 92)
  - 6th: 2021 (with Paris 92)
