= Stine Nørklit Lønborg =

Danish handball player (born 1998)

Personal information
- Born: 21 December 1998 (age 27) Albertslund, Denmark
- Height: 1.70 m (5 ft 7 in)

Sport
- Sport: Handball
- Position: Centre back
- Current club: JDA Dijon Handball
- Number: 2

Senior clubs
- Years: Team
- 2015–22: Ajax København
- 2022–: JDA Dijon Handball
National team
| Years | Team | Apps | (Gls) |
| 2017–2019 | Denmark U19 | 16 | (30) |
| 2026– | Denmark | 5 | (9) |
- Updated on 26 September 2026

Stine Nørklit Lønborg (born 21 December 1998) is a Danish handball player for JDA Dijon Handball and the Denmark national team.

== Career ==
Lønborg joined Danish 1st Division team Ajax København in 2015. She spent seven years with the team. During the 2020–21 season, she was the team's top scorer with 93 goals.

In 2022, Lønborg moved to JDA Bourgogne Dijon HB in France. The following year, she extended her contract with the team until 2025. During the winter of 2025, she again extended with the team until 2027. During the 2025–26 Women's EHF European League, she became one of the top scorers in the competition, leading JDA Bourgogne Dijon to the final four. Her performance in the domestic league saw her nominated for the Player of the Month for February 2026.

== International career ==
In 2017, Lønborg made her debut for the Denmark national under-19 team. She made her debut for the Denmark national team on 5 March 2026, playing in a friendly match against Hungary, replacing Michala Møller who missed the match due to an injury. Her second appearance came three days later, also against Hungary, in which she scored her first two goals.

== Personal life ==
Lønborg played alongside her sister, Sarah Nørklit Lønborg, at Ajax København.
