= Sara Hald =

Danish handball player (born 1996)

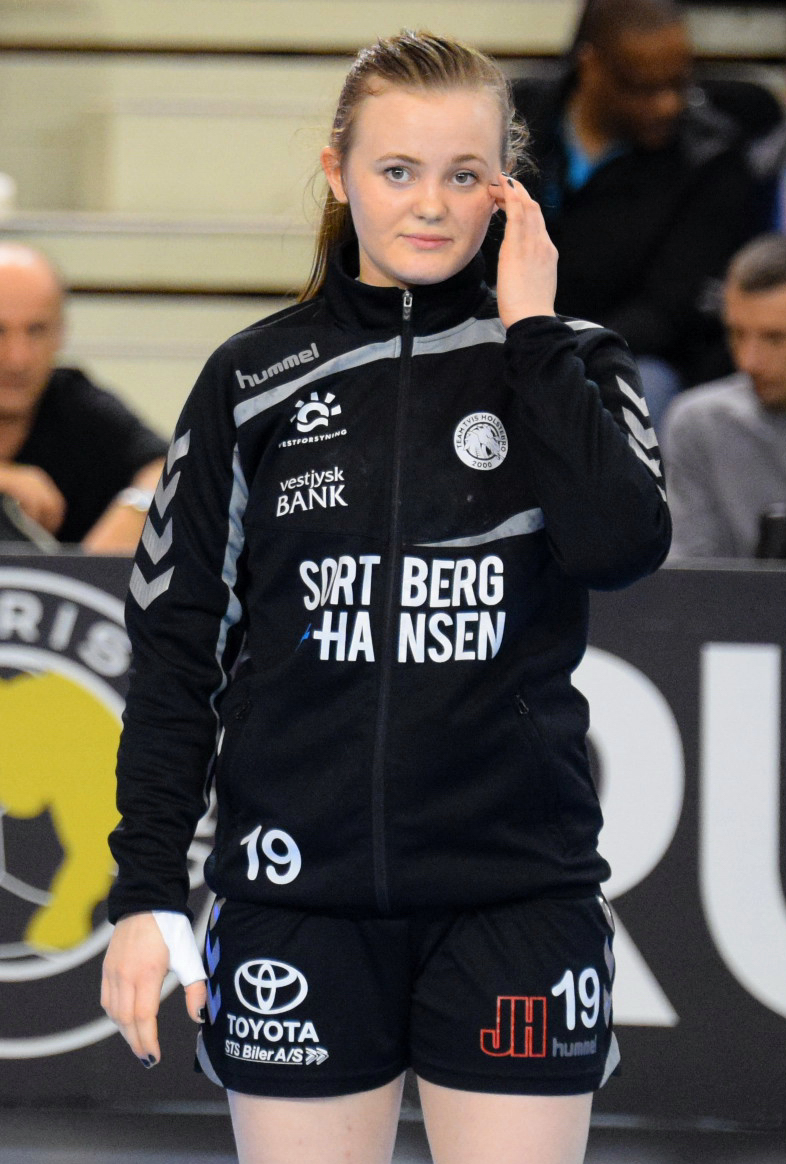
- Sara Hald in 2016

Personal information
- Full name: Sara Trier Hald
- Nationality: Danish
- Born: 4 June 1996 (age 30) Holstebro, Denmark
- Height: 1.75 m (5 ft 9 in)

Sport
- Sport: Handball
- Position: Line player
- Current club: Odense Håndbold
- Number: 19

Youth career
- Years: Team
- 2009–2012: Team Tvis Holstebro
- 2012–2013: FC Midtjylland Håndbold
- 2013–2014: Team Tvis Holstebro

Senior clubs
- Years: Team
- 2014–2018: Team Tvis Holstebro
- 2018–2021: Odense Håndbold
- 2021–: Viborg HK
Medal record
IHF Junior World Championship
Gold medal – first place	2016 Russia
IHF Youth World Championship
Bronze medal – third place	2014 Macedonia
European Junior Championship
Gold medal – first place	2015 Spain
European Youth Championship
Bronze medal – third place	2013 Poland

Sara Trier Hald (born 4 June 1996) is a Danish handball player who plays for Viborg HK, where she is the club captain.

In 2025 she extended her contract at the club until 2027.

In the 2020-21 season she was a part of the Odense Håndbold team that won the Danish Championship; the first national league title in club history.

For the 2020 she was a part of the extended squad for the Danish team, but was ultimately not selected for the tournament.

== International honours ==
- EHF Cup Winners' Cup:
  - Winner: 2016
- EHF Cup:
  - Winner: 2015

== Individual awards ==
- All-Star Line Player of the EHF Junior European Championship: 2015
