= Jovana Stoiljković =

Serbian handball player (born 1988)

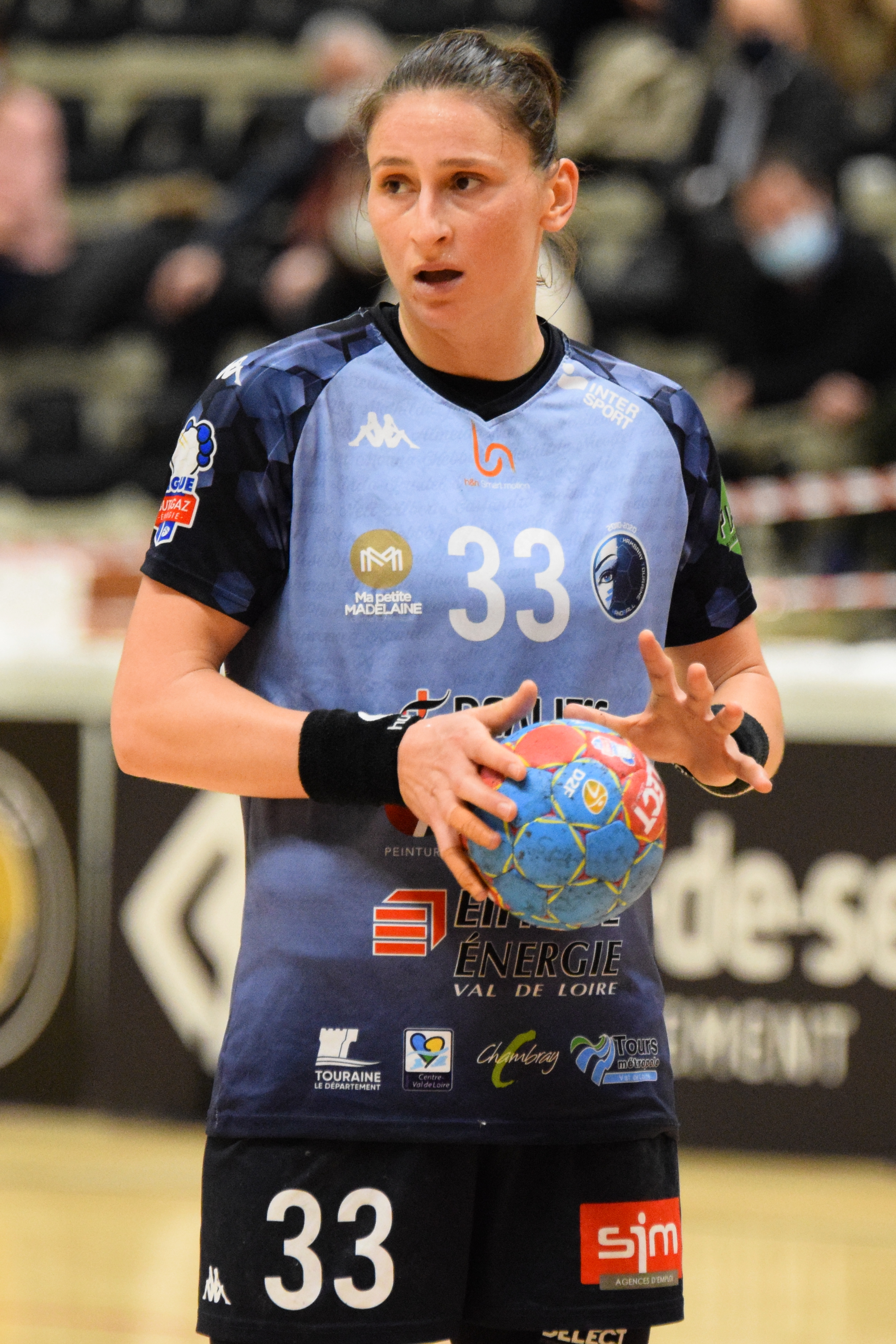
- Jovana Stojiljković (2020)

Personal information
- Nationality: Serbian
- Born: 30 September 1988 (age 38) Belgrad, SR Serbia, SFR Yugoslavia
- Height: 1.81 m (5 ft 11 in)

Sport
- Sport: Handball
- Position: Left back
- Current club: Chambray Touraine
- Number: 33

Senior clubs
- Years: Team
- 2009–2011: ŽRK Naisa Niš
- 2011–2012: ŽRK Zaječar
- 2012–2014: Le Havre
- 2014–2017: Nantes Handball
- 2017–2019: Brest Bretagne Handball
- 2019–: Chambray Touraine
National team
Years	Team	Apps	(Gls)
2012–2023	Serbia	109	(356)
Medal record
World Championship
Silver medal – second place	2013 Serbia
Mediterranean Games
Gold medal – first place	2013 Mersin	Team

Jovana Stoiljković (Serbian Cyrillic: Јована Стоиљковић; born 30 September 1988) is a Serbian handball player for Chambray Touraine Handball and formerly the Serbian national team.
