= Clara Lerby =

Swedish handball player (born 1999)

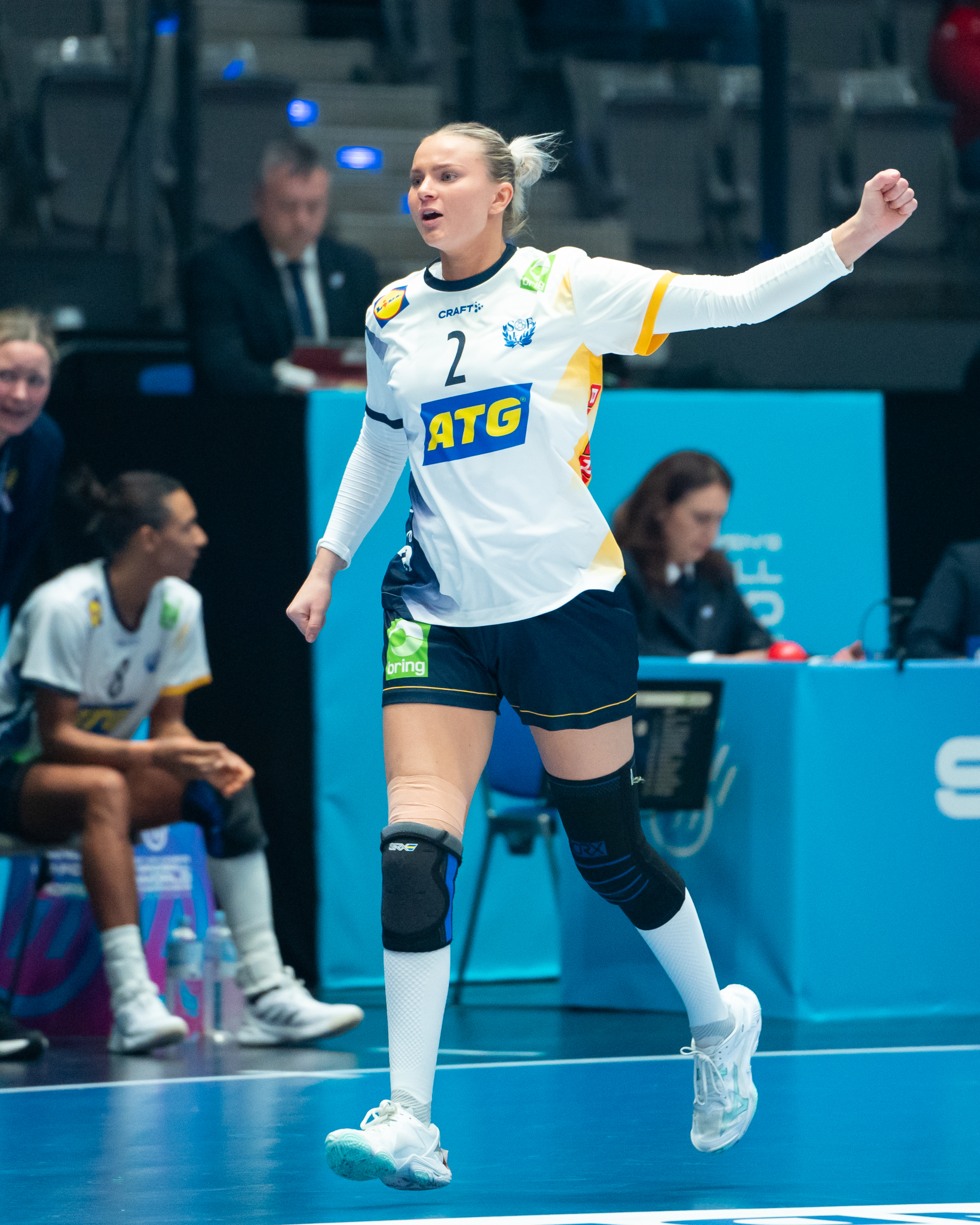

Personal information
- Full name: Clara Hanna Lerby
- Nationality: Swedish
- Born: 8 May 1999 (age 27) Trelleborg, Sweden
- Height: 1.72 m (5 ft 8 in)

Sport
- Sport: Handball
- Position: Left wing
- Current club: Nykøbing Falster Håndboldklub
- Number: 30

Youth career
- Years: Team
- –2015: Trelleborg HBK
- 2015–2018: Kungälvs HK

Senior clubs
- Years: Team
- 2018–2019: Kungälvs HK
- 2019–2023: Lugi HF
- 2023–2025: EH Aalborg
- 2025–: Nykøbing Falster Håndboldklub
National team
Years	Team	Apps	(Gls)
2021–	Sweden	39	(156)
- Updated on 12 April 2026

Clara Lerby (born 8 May 1999) is a Swedish handball player for Nykøbing Falster Håndboldklub and the Swedish national team.

Lerby represented Sweden at the 2017 Women's U-19 European Handball Championship, placing 9th and at the 2018 Women's Junior World Handball Championship, placing 12th.

She also represented Sweden at the 2021 World Women's Handball Championship.
