= Paula Posavec =

Croatian handball player (born 1996)

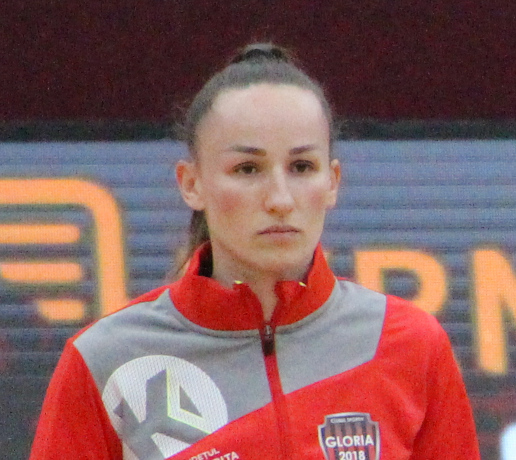

Personal information
- Nationality: Croatian
- Born: 26 August 1996 (age 30) Čakovec, Croatia
- Height: 1.70 m (5 ft 7 in)

Sport
- Sport: Handball
- Position: Left wing
- Current club: RK Lokomotiva Zagreb
- Number: 33

Senior clubs
- Years: Team
- –2017: ŽRK Zrinski Čakovec
- 2017–2021: RK Lokomotiva Zagreb
- 2021–2022: RK Krim
- 2022–2024: Gloria 2018 Bistrița-Năsăud
- 2024–2025: ŽRK Zrinski Čakovec
- 2025–: RK Lokomotiva Zagreb
National team
Years	Team	Apps	(Gls)
2016-	Croatia	97	(131)
Medal record
Women's Handball
Representing Croatia
European Championship
Bronze medal – third place	2020 Denmark
- Updated on 29 October 2026

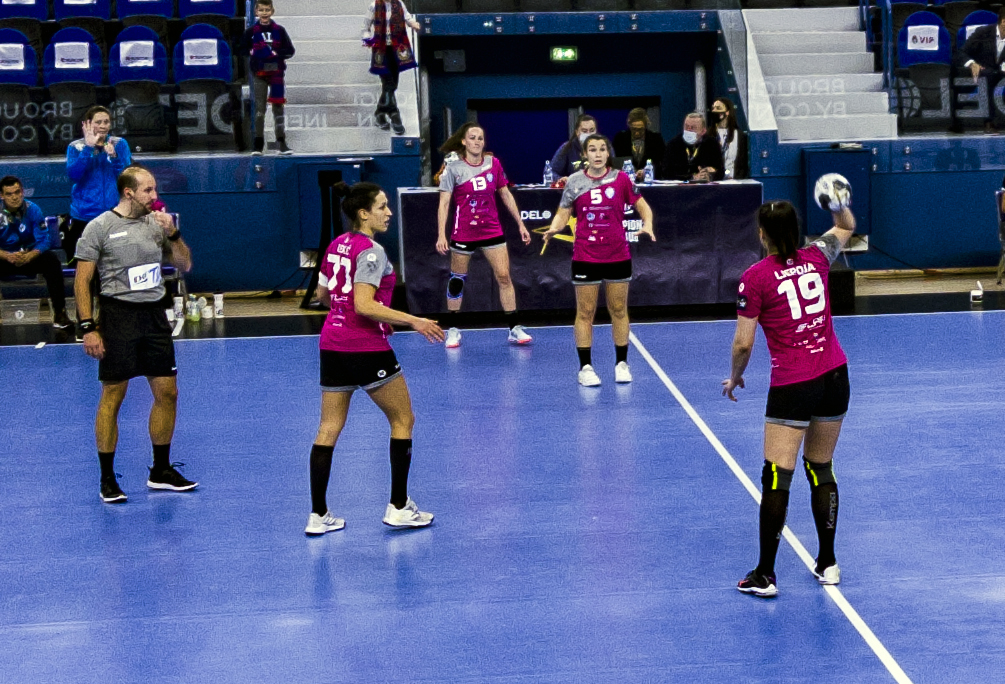

Paula Posavec (born 26 August 1996) is a Croatian handball player for RK Lokomotiva Zagreb and the Croatian national team.

She participated at the 2016 and 2018 European Women's Handball Championship.

She is Stela Posavec's twin sister.

== International honours ==
- EHF European Cup:
  - Runner-up: 2021
