= Emília Varga =

Hungarian handball player (born 2004)

Personal information
- Nationality: Hungarian
- Born: 14 July 2004 (age 22) Budapest, Hungary
- Height: 1.84 m (6 ft 0 in)

Sport
- Sport: Handball
- Position: Left back
- Current club: Esztergomi KC

Youth career
- Years: Team
- 2014–2019: Győri ETO KC
- 2019–2020: NEKA

Senior clubs
- Years: Team
- 2020–2023: NEKA
- 2023–2025: Mosonmagyaróvári KC SE
- 2025–: Esztergomi KC
National team
Years	Team	Apps	(Gls)
2025–	Hungary	1	(2)
Medal record
Junior European Championship
Gold medal – first place	2023 Romania
Youth European Championship
Gold medal – first place	2021 Montenegro
Junior World Championship
Silver medal – second place	2024 North Macedonia
Youth World Championships
Bronze medal – third place	2022 North Macedonia

Emília Varga (born 14 July 2004) is a Hungarian handballer for Esztergomi KC and the Hungarian national team.

== Career ==
=== Club ===
Emília started her career in Győri ETO KC in 2014. She played in the Győri ETO KC youth teams until 2019. In the summer of 2019, he joined the National Handball Academy (NEKA) team. From 2020, in addition to the youth championship, he also played a role in the adult team in the Nemzeti Bajnokság I/B. At the end of the year, they won a bronze medal, and a year later they became silver medalists and were promoted to the Nemzeti Bajnokság I. In 2022/23, her first top-flight season, she scored 98 goals in 26 games. In the summer of 2023, she transferred to the Mosonmagyaróvári KC SE team, ranked fourth in the league and starting in the EHF European League. In her first season in Mosonmagyaróvári KC SE, she scored 59 goals in the Nemzeti Bajnokság I, and also scored 1 goals in the EHF European League. In the 2024/25 season, she scored 9 goals in 6 matches in the EHF European League. In the summer of 2025, she transferred to Esztergomi KC, which finished third in the previous championship and therefore competed in the EHF European League.

=== National team ===
In August 2021, Emília scored 2 goals in the 25–19 final win over Germany at the Youth European Championship. In August 2022, she won a bronze medal at the Youth World Championships, she scored 6 goals. In July 2023, at the Junior European Championship held in Romania, she scored 11 goals in the final against the Danish national team, helping the national team to its third consecutive Junior European Championship title. In June 2024, she won a silver medal with the national team at the Junior World Championship held in North Macedonia, after the Hungary women's national junior handball team lost to the France women's national junior handball team 29–26 in the final. She made her debut for the Hungarian women's adult national team in Budapest in March 2025 in a warm-up match against the Ukrainian national team, in which she scored 2 goals. He was included in the large squad of the 2025 World Women's Handball Championship, but in the end he will not become a member of the narrow squad.

== Honours ==
=== National team ===
- Junior European Championship:
  - Gold: 2023
- Youth European Championship:
  - Gold: 2021
- Junior World Championship:
  - Silver: 2024
- Youth World Championships:
  - Bronze: 2022

=== Club ===
NEKA

- Nemzeti Bajnokság I/B
  - Silver: 2022
  - Bronze: 2021

Mosonmagyaróvári KC SE

- Nemzeti Bajnokság I:
  - Bronze: 2024
