= 2023–24 Handball-Bundesliga (women) =

Handball-Bundesliga Frauen
- Season: 2023–24
- Dates: 6 September 2023 – 25 May 2024
- Champions: SG BBM Bietigheim
- Relegated: SV Union Halle-Neustadt; HSV Solingen-Gräfrath; HSG Bad Wildungen
- Champions League: SG BBM Bietigheim
- European League: HSG Bensheim/Auerbach; Thüringer HC; Borussia Dortmund Handball; TuS Metzingen
- Matches: 182
- Goals: 10,263 (56.39 per match)
- Top goalscorer: Toni-Luisa Reinemann (179 goals)

The 2023–24 Handball-Bundesliga Frauen was the 48th season of Handball-Bundesliga Frauen, Germany's premier handball league.

On 11 May 2024, defending champions SG BBM Bietigheim secured their third consecutive and fifth overall title following a 38–27 victory over VfL Oldenburg.

== Teams ==
Location of the Handball-Bundesliga Frauen 2023–24 teams

=== Team changes ===
Promoted from 2022–23 2. Handball-Bundesliga Frauen	Relegated from 2022–23 Handball-Bundesliga Frauen
HSV Solingen-Graefrath	VfL Waiblingen

=== Stadiums ===
Team	Location	Arena	Capacity
HSV Solingen-Gräfrath	Solingen	Klingenhalle	2,200
Buxtehuder SV	Buxtehude	Schulzentrum Nord	1,800
BSV Sachsen Zwickau	Zwickau	Zwickau-Neuplanitz	900
Thüringer HC	Nordhausen	Wiedigsburghalle	2,100
HSG Bensheim/Auerbach	Bensheim	Weststadthalle	2,000
VfL Oldenburg	Oldenburg	EWE Arena	2,300
TuS Metzingen	Tübingen	Paul Horn-Arena	3,132
SG BBM Bietigheim	Ludwigsburg	MHPArena	3,800
Neckarsulmer SU	Neckarsulm	Ballei-Sporthalle	1,200
HSG Blomberg-Lippe	Blomberg	Schulzentrum Blomberg	900
Borussia Dortmund Handball	Dortmund	Sporthalle Wellinghofen	2,500
HSG Bad Wildungen	Bad Wildungen	Ensesporthalle	800
SV Union Halle-Neustadt	Halle	ERDGAS Sportarena	1,200
Bayer 04 Leverkusen	Leverkusen	Ostermann-Arena	3,500

=== Personnel and kits ===
Club	Manager	Kit manufacturer
HSG Blomberg-Lippe	(Germany) Steffen Birkner	(Italy) Erreà
VfL Oldenburg	(Germany) Niels Bötel	(Germany) Adidas
Thüringer HC	(Germany) Herbert Müller	(Denmark) Mizuno
TuS Metzingen	(Switzerland) Werner Bösch	(Germany) Kempa
BSV Sachsen Zwickau	(Germany) Norman Rentsch	(Denmark) Mizuno
HSG Bensheim/Auerbach	(Germany) Heike Ahlgrimm	(Germany) Kempa
Buxtehuder SV	(Germany) Dirk Leun	(Germany) Kempa
Neckarsulmer SU	(Germany) Thomas Zeitz	(Denmark) Mizuno
HSV Solingen-Gräfrath	(Germany) Kerstin Reckenthäler	(Denmark) Hummel
SG BBM Bietigheim	(Denmark) Jakob Vestergaard	(Denmark) Hummel
HSG Bad Wildungen	(Netherlands) Tessa Bremmer	(Denmark) Hummel
Bayer 04 Leverkusen	(Germany) Michael Biegler	(Denmark) Hummel
Borussia Dortmund Handball	(Netherlands) Henk Groener	(Germany) Puma
SV Union Halle-Neustadt	(Germany) Jan-Henning Himborn	(Denmark) Hummel

== Standings ==
Pos	Team	Pld	W	D	L	GF	GA	GD	Pts	Qualification or relegation
1	SG BBM Bietigheim (C)	26	24	2	0	907	626	+281	50	Champions League
2	HSG Bensheim/Auerbach	26	20	2	4	793	711	+82	42	EHF European League
3	Thüringer HC	26	19	1	6	847	679	+168	39	EHF European League
4	Borussia Dortmund Handball	26	19	1	6	719	637	+82	39	EHF European League
5	TuS Metzingen	26	16	0	10	773	717	+56	32	EHF European League
6	HSG Blomberg-Lippe	26	16	0	10	743	702	+41	32	
7	VfL Oldenburg	26	14	1	11	798	748	+50	29	
8	Bayer 04 Leverkusen	26	11	1	14	665	695	−30	23	
9	Buxtehuder SV	26	11	1	14	690	731	−41	23	
10	Neckarsulmer SU	26	7	0	19	703	772	−69	14	
11	BSV Sachsen Zwickau	26	7	0	19	662	792	−130	14	
12	SV Union Halle-Neustadt (R)	26	4	3	19	630	772	−142	11	Relegated to 2. Handball-Bundesliga
13	HSV Solingen-Gräfrath (R)	26	3	3	20	676	818	−142	9	Relegated to 2. Handball-Bundesliga
14	HSG Bad Wildungen (R)	26	3	1	22	657	863	−206	7	Relegated to 2. Handball-Bundesliga

Source: HBLF
Rules for classification: 1) points; 2) goal difference; 3) goals scored; 4) head-to-head points; 5) head-to-head goal difference; 6) head-to-head number of goals scored.
(C) Champions; (R) Relegated

== Season statistics ==
=== Top goalscorers ===
Rank	Player	Club	Goals
1	(Germany) Toni-Luisa Reinemann	Oldenburg	179
2	(Slovenia) Ema Hrvatin	BSV Sachsen Zwickau	166
3	(Portugal) Mariana Ferreira Lopes	Bayer Leverkusen	160
4	(Germany) Nina Engel	Neckarsulmer SU	151
5	(Austria) Johanna Reichert	Thüringer HC	143
6	(Poland) Paulina Uścinowicz	HSV Solingen-Gräfrath	141
6	(Germany) Anika Hampel	HSG Bad Wildungen	141
8	(Germany) Isabelle Dölle	Buxtehuder SV	135
8	(Netherlands) Amber Verbraeken	Neckarsulmer SU	135
10	(Germany) Mareike Thomaier	Bayer Leverkusen	134
