= Nieke Kühne =

German handball player (born 2004)

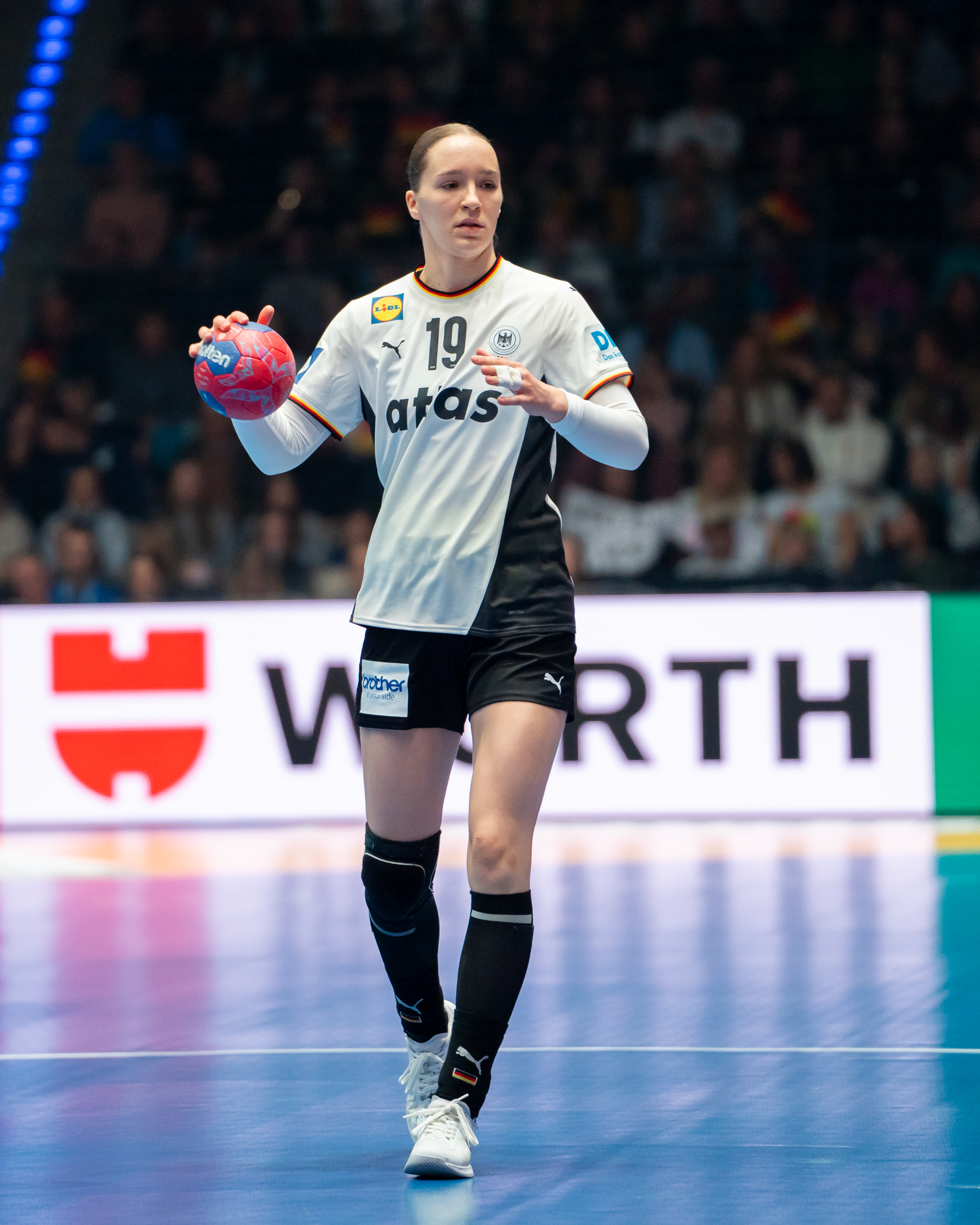

Personal information
- Nationality: German
- Born: 9 September 2004 (age 22) Wolfenbüttel, Germany
- Height: 1.85 m (6 ft 1 in)

Sport
- Sport: Handball
- Position: Left back
- Current club: HSG Blomberg-Lippe
- Number: 9

Youth career
- Years: Team
- –: MTV Seesen
- –2021: Northeimer HC
- 2020–2021: TV Hannover-Badenstedt
- 2021–2022: HSG Blomberg-Lippe

Senior clubs
- Years: Team
- 2022–: HSG Blomberg-Lippe
National team
Years	Team	Apps	(Gls)
2024–	Germany	21	(44)
Medal record
World Championship
Silver medal – second place	2025 Netherlands/Germany
- Updated on 27 January 2026

Nieke Kühne (born 9 September 2004) is a German handball player for HSG Blomberg-Lippe and the German national team. She was part of the silver-winning squad at the 2025 World Handball Championship.

== Club career ==
=== Early years ===
Kühne was born in Wolfenbüttel. She started playing handball aged four at the MTV Seesen, but switched to Northeimer HC when she was six due to a lack of players at Seesen. Kühne progressed as high as the first team (which played in the fourth tier), where she was allowed to play with a special permit due to her age. She moved to TV Hannover-Badenstedt in 2020 to play in the A-Jugend (highest youth group) Handball-Bundesliga, whilst also winning the B-Jugend Bundesliga title in 2021. It was planned that Kühne would play in parallel for the Northeim first team that season, but that was made impossible by the COVID-19 pandemic.

=== Rise to stardom at Blomberg-Lippe ===
==== 2021–22 ====
In the summer of 2021, Kühne moved to Handball-Bundesliga team HSG Blomberg-Lippe. Her performances led to the A-Jugend team reaching the age group's Bundesliga final, but despite being named the player of the tournament, Kühne and Blomberg-Lippe lost the final to TSV Bayer 04 Leverkusen. That year Kühne also played for the club's second team in the third division, winning its region. In addition, Kühne made her EHF European League debut against Váci NKSE, scoring twice. Finally, she played in several Bundesliga matches. At the final match of the Bundesliga season, Kühne scored two goals versus SV Union Halle-Neustadt.

==== 2022–23 ====
During the summer of 2022, Kühne was announced to be signing her first professional contract with the team upon her 18th birthday in September. She made her Bundesliga debut as a full-on professional two days later against Buxtehuder SV, scoring one goal in a 24–27 away loss. Her first standout match of the campaign came in a 35–19 victory versus Waiblingen on matchday 4, where she scored six goals. Kühne's first top-scoring match came in a loss against Thüringer HC, where she and Laura Rüffieux scored five goals each. She then suffered a broken finger, leaving her unavailable for several matches during the winter. Kühne made her comeback eight weeks after her injury and scored twice in a dominant win against Waiblingen. Six and five goals respectively in wins against HSG Bad Wildungen and Neckarsulmer SU demonstrated her return to form, while two further victories allowed Blomberg-Lippe to gain ground in the league table. Four goals from Kühne against Halle gave the HSG its fifth successive win, though that streak broke against Borussia Dortmund. Kühne scored five goals in a win versus HSG Bensheim/Auerbach, with her second half performance being particularly praised. Blomberg-Lippe lost against VfL Oldenburg on the final matchday, thus losing out on the European places and finishing fifth. Aside from a successful debut Bundesliga season, Kühne also led the under-19 team to the German title. After winning the final against HC Leipzig, Kühne was named the tournament's best player and top scorer.

==== 2023–24 ====
Kühne started the 2023–24 season by scoring five goals — all during the first 15 minutes — in a 32–20 win away at BSV Sachsen Zwickau. Four goals in a home win against Halle-Neustadt followed, before Blomberg-Lippe lost away in Dortmund, where Kühne scored twice. Kühne followed that up with four strikes in a win versus Buxtehude, then scored twice in a close loss at Oldenburg, and five times during a closely-fought victory against Bad Wildungen. Though Kühne only scored once against Bensheim/Auerbach, the team managed to scrape a last-minute victory against the unbeaten team.

Following the World Championship break, Blomberg-Lippe beat TuS Metzingen, with Kühne contributing six goals. She then scored twice in a win against Leverkusen, and twice again in a loss versus Thüringer HC. A few days after being the sole top scorer with five goals in a heavy defeat at Neckarsulm, Kühne extended her HSG contract. Kühne shone again against league leaders SG BBM Bietigheim, where she was joint-top scorer (five goals) despite another loss. In a 33–20 win over Zwickau to start the second half of the campaign, Kühne scored a leading eight times. Five goals followed in a dominant win in Halle. Kühne played a decisive role in the HSG's 26–25 win against direct rivals Dortmund, scoring four goals, including twice in the closing ten minutes. She scored eight goals against Buxtehude, with six of those coming in the first half and another being a decisive late goal to secure victory. The team then lost against Oldenburg, despite Kühne getting on the score sheet five times. Kühne was singled out by the Bad Wildungen defence, who kept her down to three goals by marking her with multiple players; Blomberg-Lippe nevertheless won commandingly. A 34-31 triumph with six goals from Kühne followed in Bensheim, but she missed the next two matches due to an injury she suffered during the international break at the under-20 national team. She scored once on her return against Leverkusen, which Blomberg-Lippe beat 25–20. The season ended poorly with three consecutive defeats, as Kühne scored four in Thüringen, three against Neckarsulm, and two versus champions Bietigheim. The team finished the season sixth overall.

==== 2024–25 ====
Kühne began the 2024–25 season by scoring five goals and drawing a red card from Blanka Kajdon in a defeat at Zwickau. Thanks in part to her scoring six goals against Leverkusen, Blomberg-Lippe took its first win on matchday 2. A tougher match followed, as Kühne received two time penalties and scored just once in a loss against Dortmund. She bounced back to bring victory against Metzingen with six goals, before scoring four to win at Neckarsulm. Despite receiving another two time penalties versus Bensheim/Auerbach, Kühne helped her team to victory by scoring four and drawing a penalty. With two Kühne goals, Blomberg-Lippe drew its next match against Oldenburg. Due to a knee injury in the build up to the 2024 European Handball Championship, Kühne missed the team's first two matches following the league's return.

On her return, a 34–22 win against Frisch Auf Göppingen, Kühne scored thrice but also received a red card for collecting a third two-minute suspension. The HSG then won dominantly against Zwickau; Kühne scored twice. In a committed performance versus Leverkusen, Kühne scored eight goals to lead the team to a 31–22 win. Kühne shone again against Dortmund, scoring six and assisting several in a celebrated victory. Six more goals allowed Kühne to be the top scorer the following week, as Blomberg-Lippe beat Metzingen 29–18. Versus Neckarsulm, Kühne stood out defensively, but contributed to another win with five strikes. The HSG suffered a heavy defeat away at Bensheim/Aurbach, despite Kühne's six goals. She struggled in attack against Oldenburg, only scoring twice, but Blomberg-Lippe recovered to win comfortably. In February 2025, Kühne confirmed that she would remain at Blomberg-Lippe until Summer 2026.

In the first league match after her contract extension, an away fixture at Buxtehude, Kühne impressed with her speed and long-range shots, scoring eleven times (despite suffering two two-minute penalties) to inspire the HSG to a narrow 28–26 victory. The battle versus fourth-placed Thüringer HC saw Kühne focus on her defensive duties, scoring just twice in another HSG triumph. Kühne missed the subsequent game, one that was lost against league leaders HB Ludwigsburg. She also made no appearance against Göppingen, which the HSG beat to secure third place in the regular season.

To start the play-offs, Blomberg-Lippe beat Oldenburg twice to progress to the semi-final; Kühne scored three and four respectively. This teed up a matchup with Borussia Dortmund, the first leg of which Kühne's team lost despite her eight goals. Kühne shone in the return fixture, using trickery and speed to score another eight in a narrow victory. In the resulting third leg, Kühne was once again the top scorer with six, as Blomberg-Lippe won and qualified for the final against Ludwigsburg. Though Kühne scored six times in game 1, the HSG lost, in part due to a strong goalkeeping performance by Johanna Bundsen. Kühne scored a match-high seven in the home leg, but could not prevent Ludwigsburg from winning the match and league title. In total, Kühne scored 121 goals in the league, which placed her eighth in the scoring charts.

During the campaign, Kühne and Blomberg-Lippe took part in the EHF European League. The team won its group, in part thanks to dominant performances from Kühne. It then won the first leg of the quarter final against Super Amara Bera Bera, but lost the second leg; the HSG still progressed in a penalty shootout. In the one-legged semi final, Kühne and the team lost 18–28 versus Ikast Håndbold. Despite six goals from Kühne in the third-place match, the HSG lost against JDA Dijon Handball.

==== 2025–26 ====
To start the 2025–26 campaign, Kühne scored three in a win against Buxtehude. She then led the scoring charts in another home win against Metzingen with six, and led again with eight goals against Thüringer HC. Kühne scored six away at Zwickau in a 35–29 victory. In a hard-fought game versus Bensheim/Auerbach, Kühne was the top scorer with seven strikes, thus securing a fifth consecutive win for the HSG. With five goals in the second half, Kühne contributed to another victory, against Neckarsulm, that week. Kühne was the top scorer with seven in the final match before the World Championship break, a 33–23 win at Göppingen which held Blomberg-Lippe at the top of the table.

Kühne came back with five goals against Oldenburg after the World Championship, though the HSG suffered its first league defeat in said match. Six goals from Kühne three days later meanwhile earned Blomberg-Lippe a home win versus Halle-Neustadt - despite Kühne receiving a time penalty. Against title rivals Dortmund, Kühne scored five but also received another time penalty, as the match ended in a 26–31 loss. The start of the season's second half proved positive for Kühne, who scored four each in wins against Buxtehude and Thüringer HC, while getting a game-leading ten in a 32–19 dismantling of Metzingen. She scored nine against Zwickau, including several strikes late in the match, to inspire Blomberg-Lippe to another home win, before marking four goals in a narrow victory over Neckarsulm. Kühne was the top scorer against Göppingen, scoring six in a 40–22 victory. Four goals followed at Bensheim, with Kühne scoring the deciding goal in the form of a buzzer beater to beat Bensheim/Auerbach 29–28.

== International career ==
=== Junior teams ===
Kühne was part of the German under-17 side that finished second at the under-17 Euros in 2021. She made her under-19 debut in 2022, before being part of the squad at the 2023 under-19 World Cup in Romania. Kühne moved up to the under-20 team afterwards and took part in the 2024 under-20 World Cup in North Macedonia, where Germany was knocked out in the group stage.

=== Senior team (2024–present) ===
Kühne made her debut for the German national handball team in October 2024. Despite being called up to the 2024 European Handball Championship roster by Markus Gaugisch, a knee injury suffered during training caused Kühne to miss the tournament.

A year later, she was included in Gaugisch's squad for the 2025 World Handball Championship in Germany and the Netherlands. In her world championship debut against Iceland, Kühne scored five goals. She then shone in the second group game, scoring seven and being named "Player of the Match" in a dominant victory against Uruguay. The team ended up reaching the final but lost 20–23 to Norway; Kühne scored one goal. Together with Viola Leuchter, Kühne was nominated as one of the 12 candidates for the tournament's "Best Young Player Award".

== Career record ==
=== Handball career summary ===
As of match played 28 February 2026

Club	Season	League			National Cup		Europe		Other		Total	
Club	Season	Division	Apps	Goals	Apps	Goals	Apps	Goals	Apps	Goals	Apps	Goals
HSG Blomberg-Lippe	2021–22	Handball-Bundesliga	8	7	0	0	1 (Note: Appearance in 3rd qualifying round of the 2021–22 EHF European League.)	2	—		9	9
HSG Blomberg-Lippe	2022–23	Handball-Bundesliga	15	49	1	1	—		—		16	50
HSG Blomberg-Lippe	2023–24	Handball-Bundesliga	24	92	2	9	—		—		26	101
HSG Blomberg-Lippe	2024–25	Handball-Bundesliga	24	121	5	29	14 (Note: Including appearances in qualifying rounds.)	70	—		43	220
HSG Blomberg-Lippe	2025–26	Handball-Bundesliga	17	99	2	9	8 (Note: Including appearances in qualifying rounds.)	50	1 (Note: German Super Cup)	6	25	145
HSG Blomberg-Lippe	Total		88	368	10	48	23	122	1	6	122	544
Career total			88	368	10	48	23	122	1	6	122	544

== Achievements ==
- World Championship:
  - Silver : 2025
