= Nicole Roth =

German handball player (born 1995)

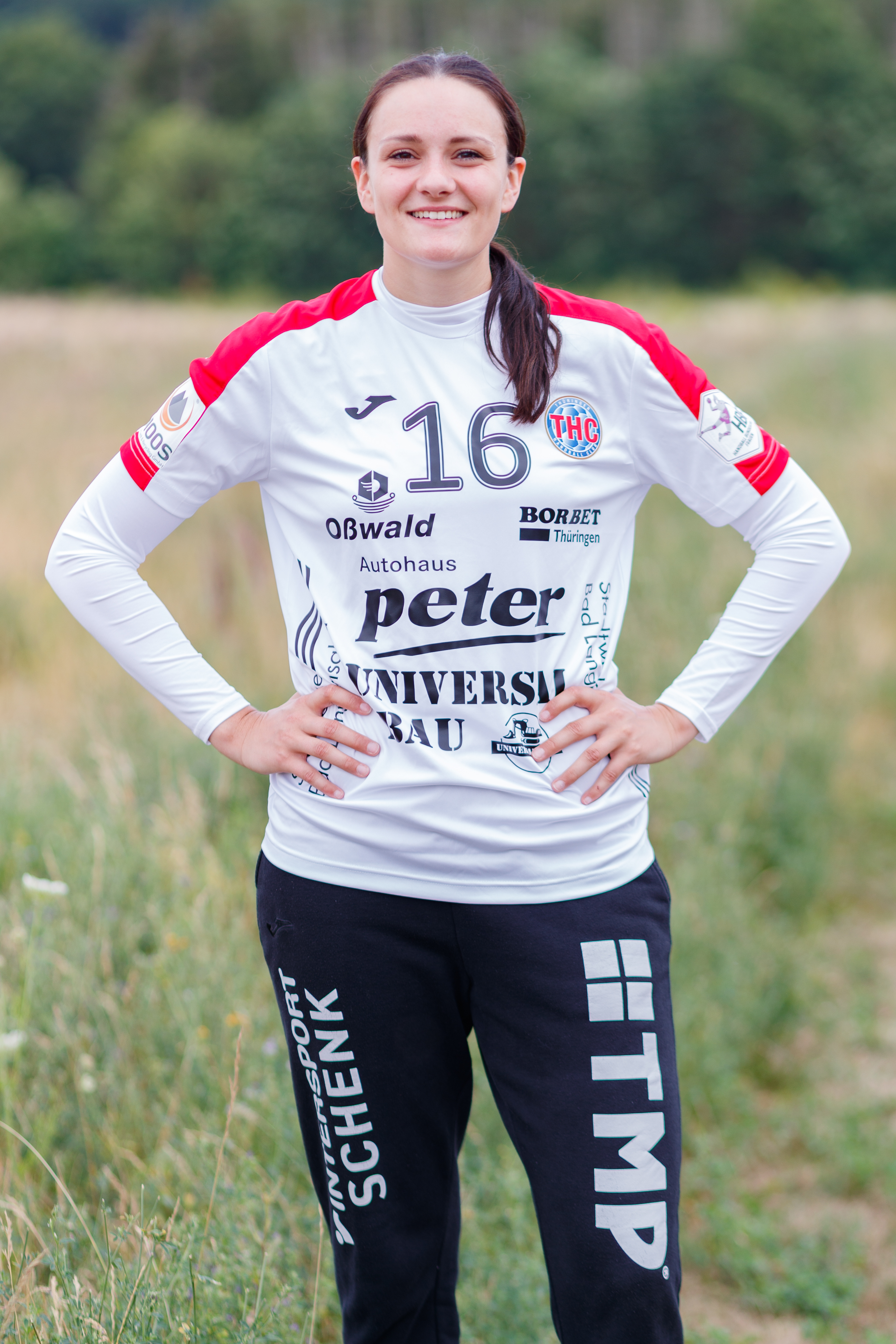

Personal information
- Nationality: German
- Born: 8 May 1995 (age 31) Nürnberg, Germany
- Height: 1.82 m (6 ft 0 in)

Sport
- Sport: Handball
- Position: Goalkeeper
- Current club: Thüringer HC
- Number: 16

Senior clubs
- Years: Team
- 2011-2015: HC Leipzig
- 2015-2017: SV Union Halle-Neustadt
- 2017: SG BBM Bietigheim
- 2018: FSG Waiblingen/Korb
- 2018-2019: Neckarsulmer SU
- 2019-2022: TuS Metzingen
- 2022-: Thüringer HC
National team
Years	Team	Apps	(Gls)
2022–	Germany	7	(0)
Medal record
World Championship
Silver medal – second place	2025 Netherlands/Germany
- Updated on 6 November 2025

Nicole Roth (born 8 May 1995) is a German female handball player for Thüringer HC and the German national team.

She is part of the German 35-player squad for the 2022 European Women's Handball Championship in North Macedonia/Montenegro/Slovenia. She also participated at the 2011 European Women's U-17 Handball Championship and 2014 Women's Junior World Handball Championship.

== Achievements ==
- Bundesliga:
  - Silver: 2018
  - Bronze: 2019
- DHB-Pokal:
  - Winner: 2014
