= Charlotte Kähr =

Swiss handball player (born 2001)

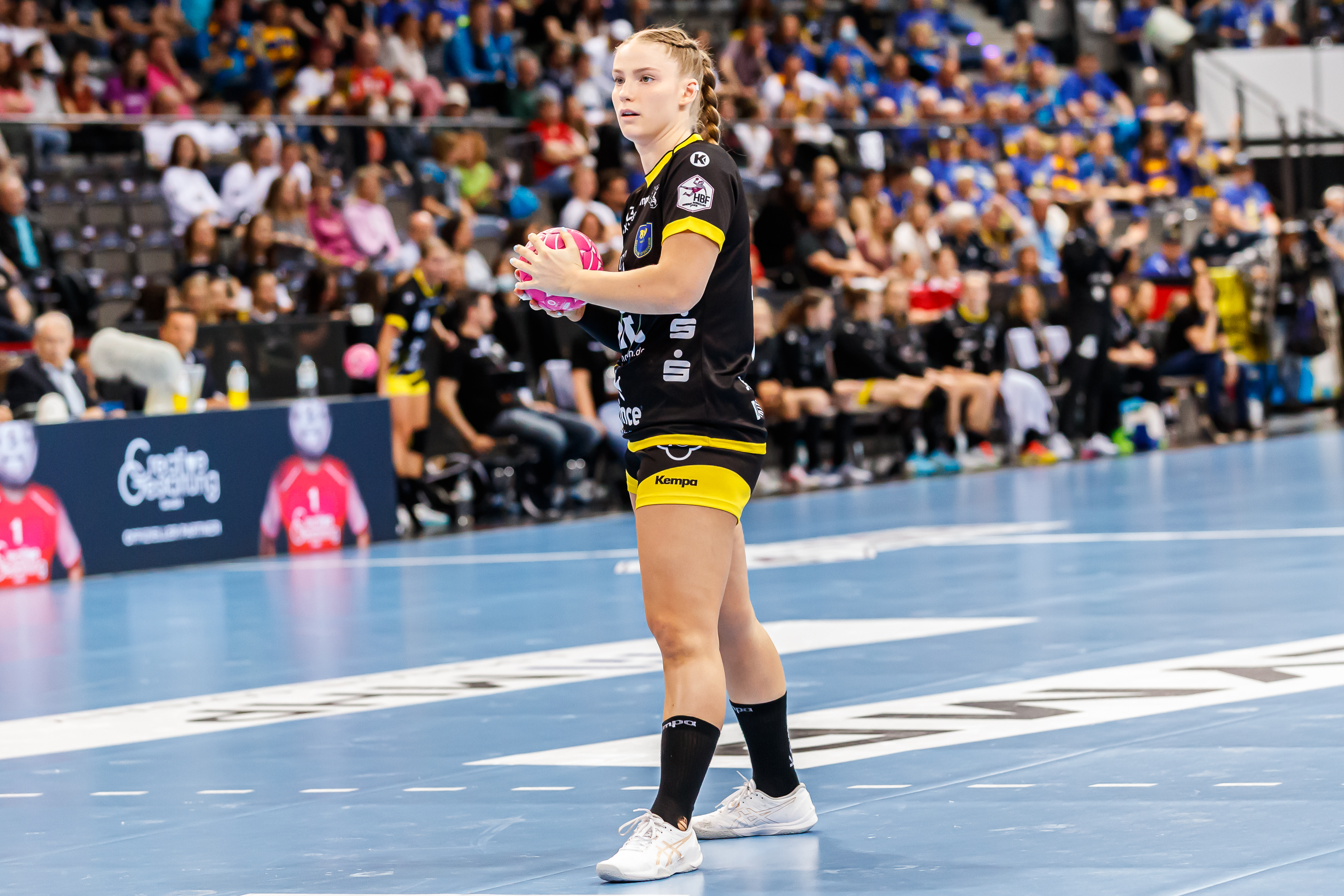
- Kähr in May 2022

Personal information
- Nationality: Swiss
- Born: 27 June 2001 (age 25) Zürich, Switzerland
- Height: 1.81 m (5 ft 11 in)

Sport
- Sport: Handball
- Position: Left back
- Current club: TuS Metzingen

Senior clubs
- Years: Team
- 2015–2017: GC Amicitia Zürich
- 2017–2021: LK Zug
- 2021–2025: Buxtehuder SV
- 2025–2026: BSV Sachsen Zwickau
- 2026–: TuS Metzingen
National team
Years	Team	Apps	(Gls)
2018–	Switzerland	70	(69)
- Updated on 14 November 2025

Charlotte Kähr (born 27 June 2001) is a Swiss handball player for TuS Metzingen in the Frauen Handball-Bundesliga and the Swiss national team.

When Kähr was 16 year old, she made her official debut in the SPAR Premium League for LK Zug. She won both the Swiss Championship and the Swiss Cup in 2021. She was awarded as Most Valuable player for the league in the 2020-21 season. In May 2021, she signed a 2-year contract with Buxtehuder SV. For the season 2025/26, Charlotte Kähr moved to BSV Sachsen Zwickau. In the summer of 2026, she will transfer to league rival TuS Metzingen.

She made her debut on the Swiss national team on 22 November 2018, against Czech Republic.

== Achievements ==
- Bundesliga:
  - Bronze: 2022
- SPAR Premium League
  - Winner: 2021
- Swiss Women's Cup
  - Winner: 2021
