= Díana Dögg Magnúsdóttir =

Icelandic handball player (born 1997)

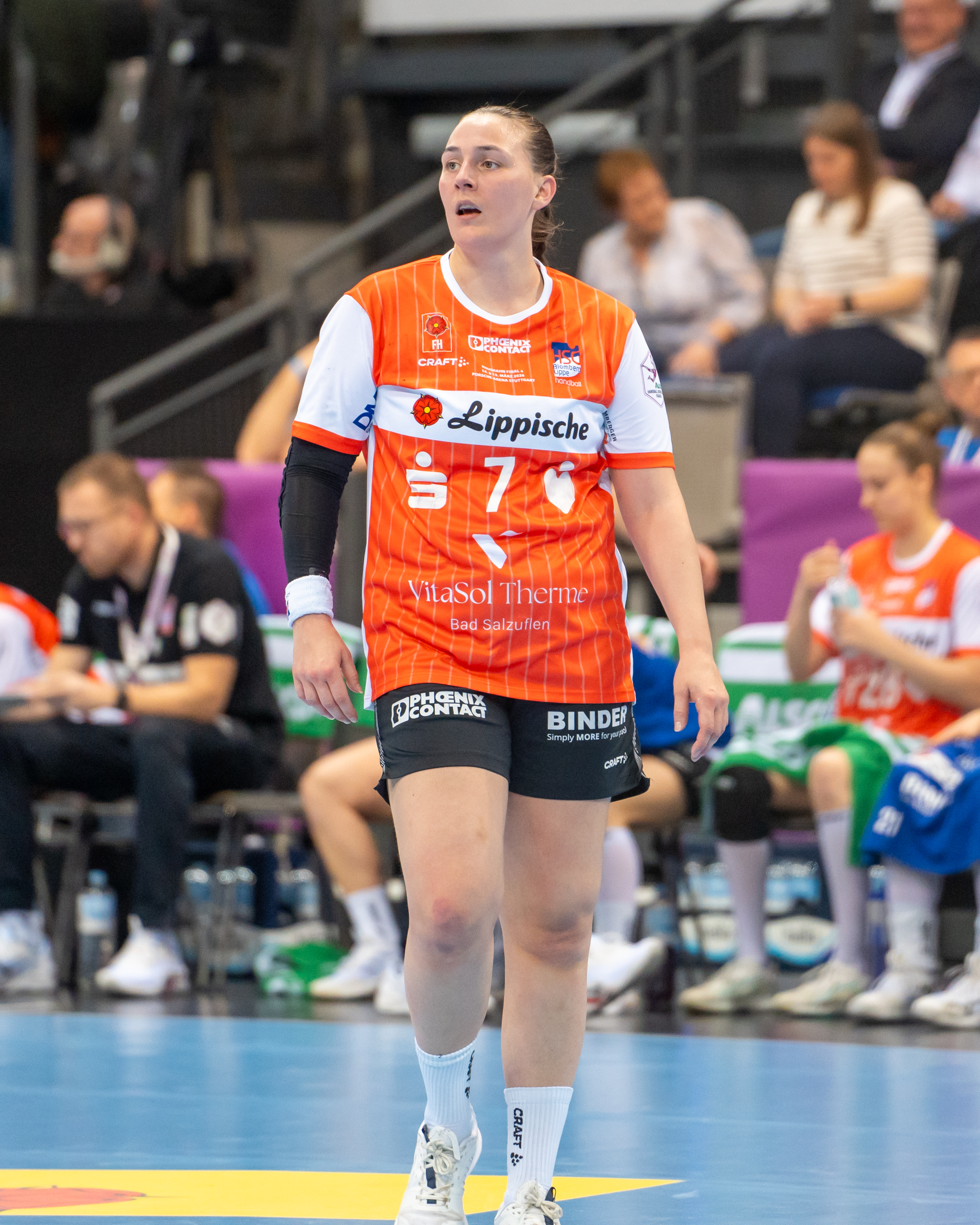
- Díana Dögg Magnúsdóttir (2026)

Personal information
- Nationality: Icelandic
- Born: 19 September 1997 (age 29) Vestmannaeyjar, Iceland
- Height: 1.74 m (5 ft 9 in)

Sport
- Sport: Handball
- Position: Right back
- Current club: HSG Blomberg-Lippe
- Number: 7

Senior clubs
- Years: Team
- -2016: ÍBV
- 2016-2020: Valur
- 2020-2024: BSV Sachsen Zwickau
- 2024-: HSG Blomberg-Lippe
National team
Years	Team	Apps	(Gls)
2022–	Iceland	65	(88)
- Updated on 7 November 2025

Díana Dögg Magnúsdóttir (born 19 September 1997) is an Icelandic handball player for the Icelandic national team and HSG Blomberg-Lippe. Previously she has also played soccer in the Besta deild kvenna for ÍBV.

== Career ==
Magnúsdóttir started playing handball at her hometown club ÍBV, where she played in both the EHF Cup and EHF Challenge Cup. In 2016 she joined league rivals Valur. Here she won the Icelandic Championship and Cup in 2019.

In 2020 she joined the German 2nd Bundesliga team BSV Sachsen Zwickau an. In 2021 she helped the team getting promoted to the Bundesliga.

In 2024 she joined league rivals HSG Blomberg-Lippe.

== National team ==
Magnúsdóttir played for the Icelandic youth national team.

On 21 March 2018 she made her debut for the Icelandic senior team in a qualification match for the 2018 European Women's Handball Championship against Slovenia.

She represented Iceland at the 2023 World Women's Handball Championship, where Iceland finished 25th. Magnúsdóttir scored 14 goals during the tournament. She represented Iceland again two years later at the 2025 World Women's Handball Championship.
