= Isabell Roch =

German handball player (born 1990)

Personal information
- Nationality: German
- Born: 26 July 1990 (age 36) Erlenbach am Main, Germany
- Height: 1.74 m (5 ft 9 in)

Sport
- Sport: Handball
- Position: Goalkeeper
- Current club: Borussia Dortmund
- Number: 26

Youth career
- Years: Team
- –: TV Großwallstadt
- –2005: HSG Aschaffenburg 08
- 2005–2006: Thüringer HC

Senior clubs
- Years: Team
- 2006–2008: Thüringer HC
- 2008–2009: Rhein-Main Bienen
- 2009–2010: Borussia Dortmund
- 2010–2015: HSG Blomberg-Lippe
- 2015–2017: SG BBM Bietigheim
- 2017–2019: TuS Metzingen
- 2019–2021: Borussia Dortmund
- 2021–2024: SCM Râmnicu Vâlcea
National team
Years	Team	Apps	(Gls)
2018–	Germany	50	(0)
- Updated on 26 November 2024

Isabell Roch (born 26 July 1990) is a German female handball player for Râmnicu Vâlcea and the German national team.

She participated at the 2018 European Women's Handball Championship.

== Achievements ==
- HBF:
  - Winner: 2017
