= Jenny Behrend =

German handball player (born 1996)

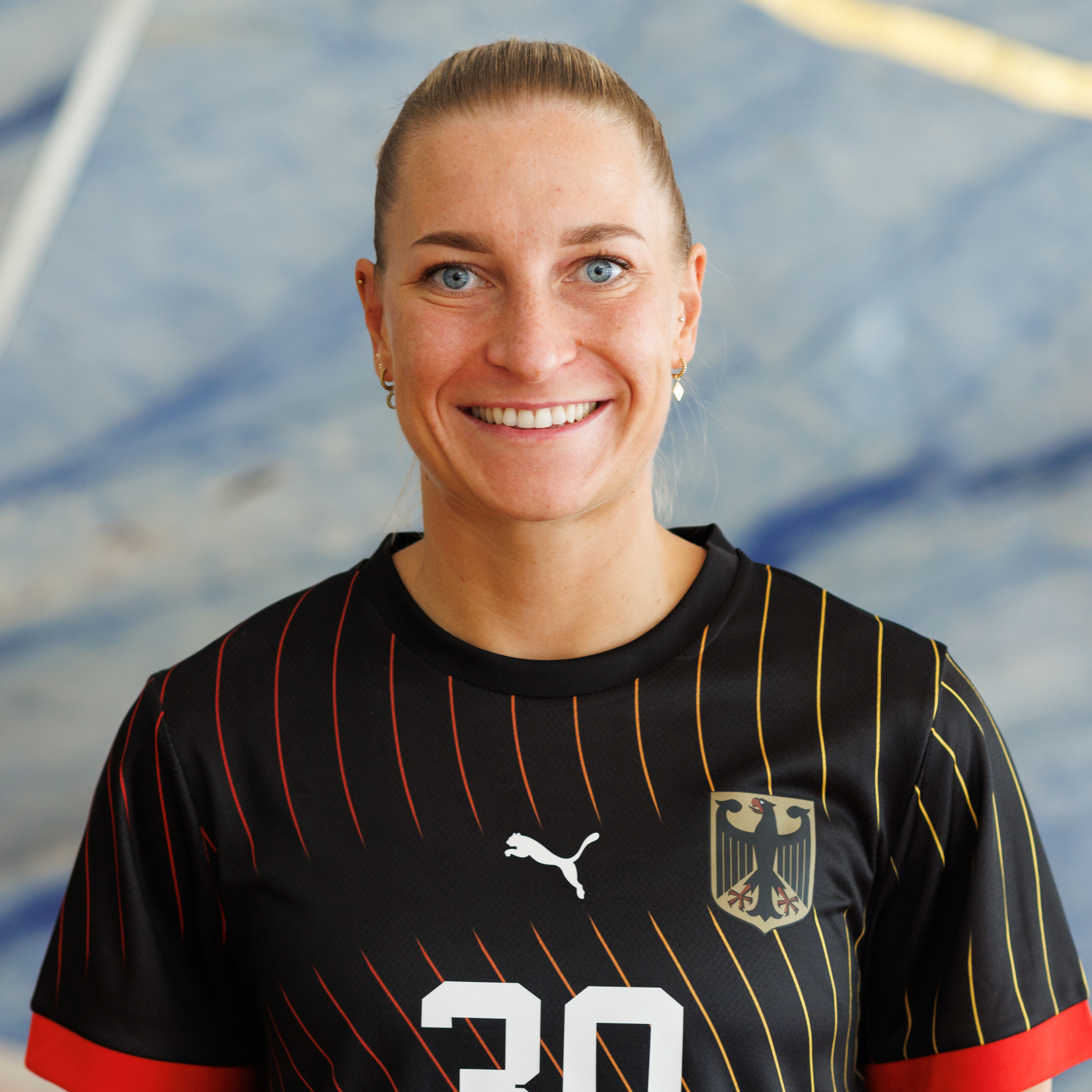

Personal information
- Nationality: German
- Born: 20 January 1996 (age 30) Rendsburg, Germany
- Height: 1.72 m (5 ft 8 in)

Sport
- Sport: Handball
- Position: Right wing
- Current club: VfL Oldenburg
- Number: 30

Senior clubs
- Years: Team
- –: HSG Hohn/Elsdorf
- –2014: TSV Owschlag
- 2014–2021: VfL Oldenburg
- 2021–2024: SG BBM Bietigheim
- 2024–2025: HB Ludwigsburg
- 2025–: VfL Oldenburg
National team
Years	Team	Apps	(Gls)
2019–	Germany	85	(165)
Medal record
World Championship
Silver medal – second place	2025 Netherlands/Germany
- Updated on 6 November 2025

Jenny Behrend (born 20 January 1996) is a German handball player for VfL Oldenburg and the German national team.

She made her debut for the national team in 2019, in a match against the Netherlands. She was selected to represent Germany at the 2019 World Women's Handball Championship in Japan.

She also represented Germany at the 2025 World Women's Handball Championship. Here Germany reached the final, where they lost to Norway. This was the first time since 1994 that Germany made the final of a major international tournament and the first time they won a medal since 2007.

== Achievements ==
- World Championship:
  - Silver : 2025
- EHF European League:
  - Winner: 2022
- Bundesliga:
  - Winner: 2022, 2023
