= WOTH (disambiguation) =

WOTH is a radio station (107.9 FM) licensed to serve Williamsport, Pennsylvania, United States.

WOTH or WotH may refer to:

- WOTH-CD, a defunct low-power television station formerly licensed to serve Cincinnati, Ohio, United States
- Women of the House, an American television series
- The Wreck of the Hesperus, a poem by Henry Wadsworth Longfellow
- Wreck of the Hesperus (band), an Irish doom metal band
- Viktória Woth, Hungarian handball player
