= Madeleine Östlund =

Swedish handball player (born 1992)

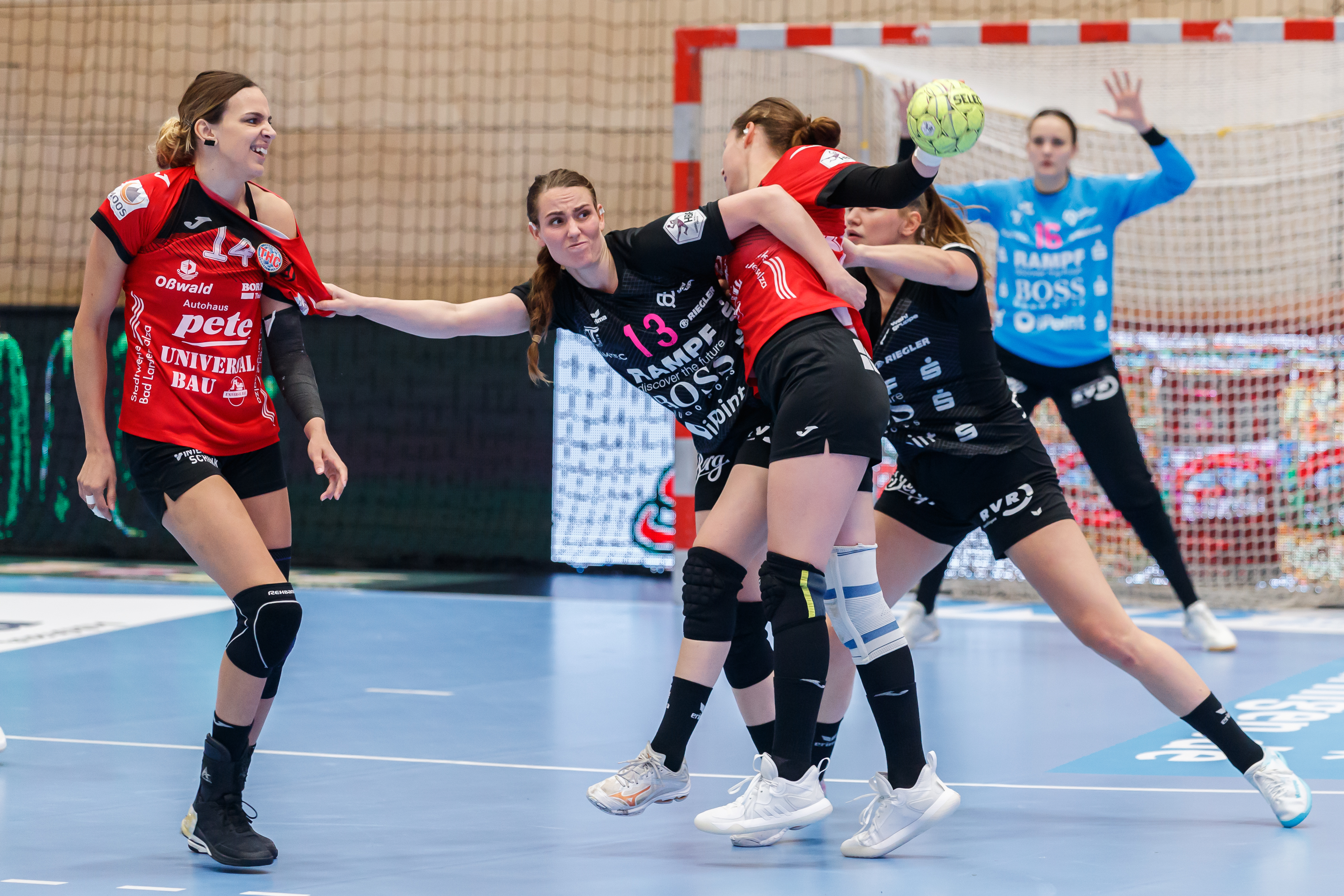

Personal information
- Full name: Madeleine Östlund
- Nationality: Swedish
- Born: 10 July 1992 (age 34) Nacka, Sweden
- Height: 1.75 m (5 ft 9 in)

Sport
- Sport: Handball
- Position: Line player
- Current club: SV Union Halle-Neustadt
- Number: 13

Senior clubs
- Years: Team
- 2011-2017: Skuru IK
- 2017-2019: Gjerpen IF
- 2019-2021: Viborg HK
- 2021-2022: TuS Metzingen
- 2022-: SV Union Halle-Neustadt

Madeline Östlund (born 10 July 1992) is a Swedish handballer for SV Union Halle-Neustadt in the Handball-Bundesliga Frauen.

== Achievements ==
- SHE:
  - Silver Medalist: 2013, 2014, 2015, 2016
- Danish Championship:
  - Silver Medalist: 2021
  - Bronze Medalist: 2020
