= Kohorst =

Kohorst is a German surname. Notable people with the surname include:

- Madita Kohorst (born 1996), German handball player
- W. Robert Kohorst (born 1953), American lawyer, businessman, and diplomat
