= Silje Brøns Petersen =

German handball player (born 1994)

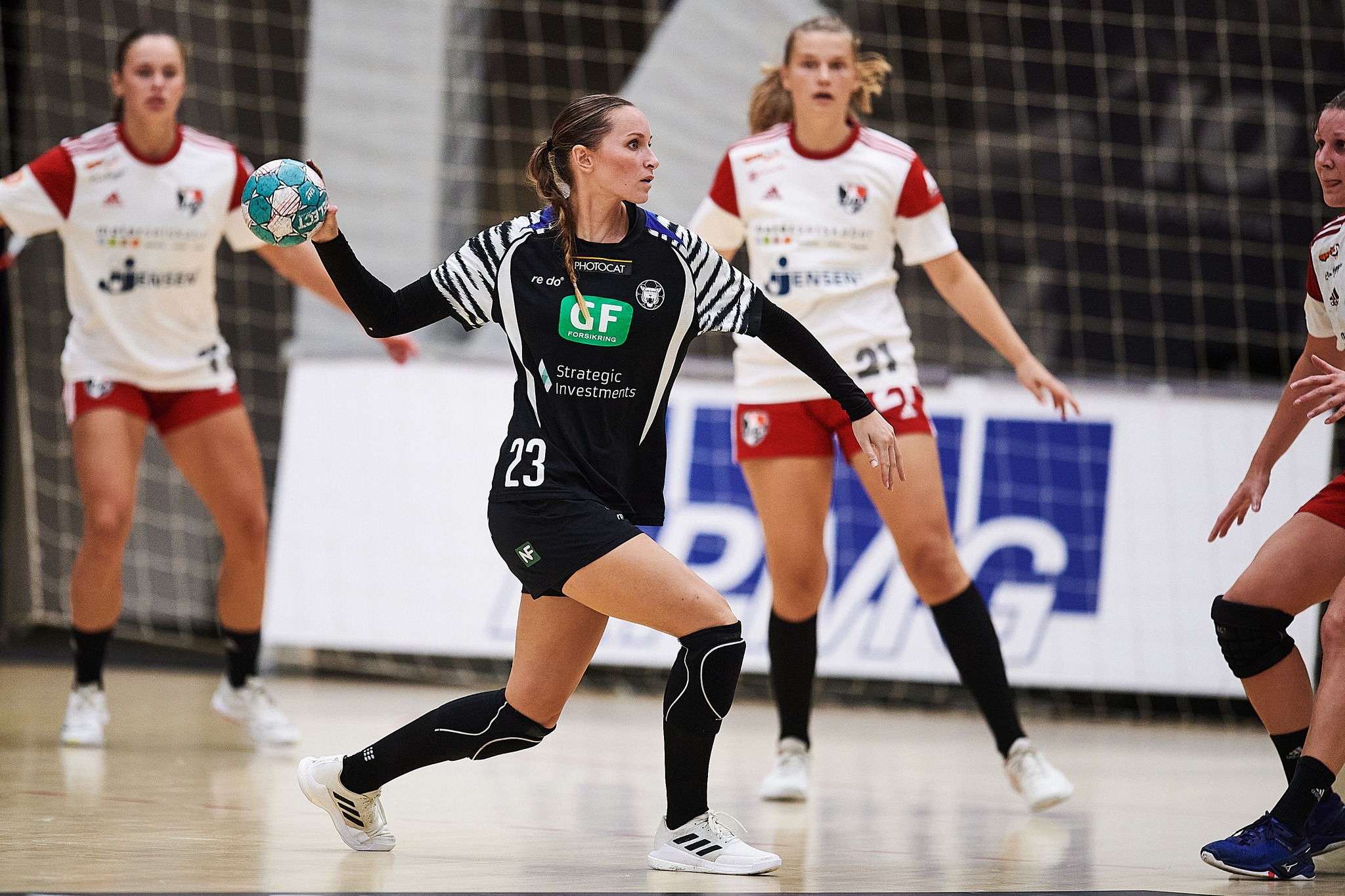
- Brøns in January 2023

Personal information
- Nationality: German/Danish
- Born: 5 December 1994 (age 31) Herlev, Denmark
- Height: 1.72 m (5 ft 8 in)

Sport
- Sport: Handball
- Position: Centre back
- Current club: BSV Sachsen Zwickau
- Number: 23

Youth career
- Years: Team
- 2011–2013: Rødovre HK

Senior clubs
- Years: Team
- 2013–2015: Virum-Sorgenfri HK
- 2015–2016: Siófok KC
- 2016: Virum-Sorgenfri HK
- 2016–2020: HSG Blomberg-Lippe
- 2021–2022: TuS Metzingen
- 2022–1/2024: København Håndbold
- 1/2024–7/2024: PDO Handball Team Salerno
- 7/2024–2025: EH Aalborg
- 2025–: BSV Sachsen Zwickau
National team
Years	Team	Apps	(Gls)
2021–	Germany	23	(23)

Silje Brøns Petersen (born 5 December 1994) is a Danish-German handball player who plays for PDO Handball Team Salerno and since 2024 the German national team. She is under contract with German Bundesliga club BSV Sachsen Zwickau.

== Early life ==
Brøns Petersen comes from the Copenhagen suburb of Herlev. She comes from a handball family: Her father was a player and is now a coach, her mother was a Champions League winner and her older sisters Emilie and Nikoline also play handball professionally as well.

== Club career ==
As a teenager, Brøns Petersen was part of the Danish team at Rødovre HK and moved to the second division team Virum-Sorgefri HK in 2013.

In 2015, she moved to the Nemzeti Bajnokság I club Siófok KC. In Spring 2016, her one-year contract was extended, but in May of the same year the contract was terminated and Petersen returned to Virum-Sorgefri. In December 2016 she moved to HSG Blomberg-Lippe. In February 2018, her contract was extended to 2020. She then moved to TuS Metzingen. From the summer of 2022, she was under contract with the Danish first division club København Håndbold. In January 2024, she moved to the Italian first division club PDO Handball Team Salerno. In the summer of 2024, she signed a contract with the Danish club EH Aalborg. For the 2025/26 season, Silje Brøns Petersen moved to the German Bundesliga club BSV Sachsen Zwickau.

== International career ==
Brøns Petersen was called up to the German national team by head coach Henk Groener in November 2021. She made her international debut against Russia on 7 November.
