= Julia Niewiadomska =

Polish handball player (born 2002)

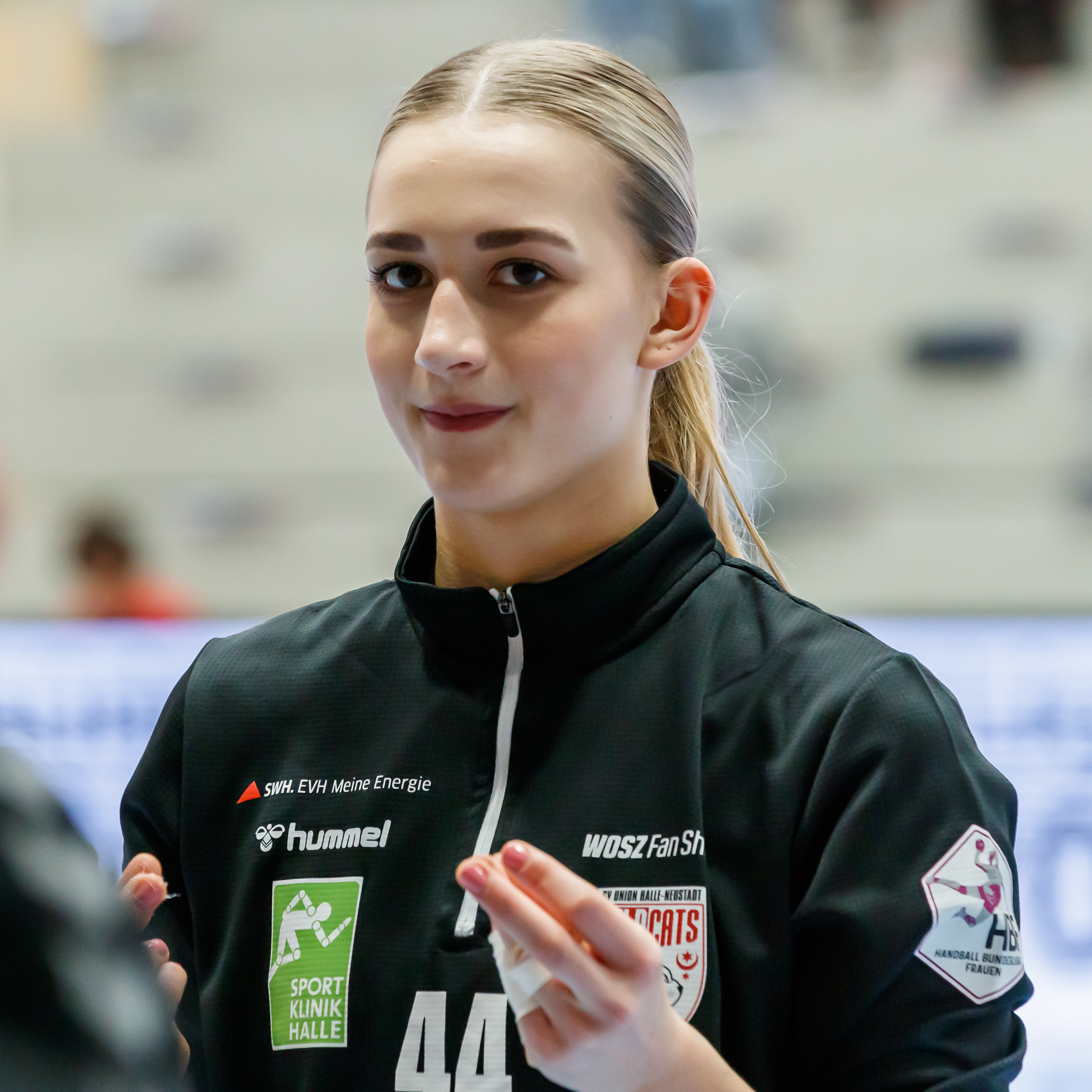

Personal information
- Nationality: Polish
- Born: 11 February 2002 (age 24) Warsaw, Poland
- Height: 1.70 m (5 ft 7 in)

Sport
- Sport: Handball
- Position: Left back
- Current club: BSV Sachsen Zwickau
- Number: 44

Senior clubs
- Years: Team
- 2019-2021: HSG Bensheim/Auerbach
- 2021-2024: SV Union Halle-Neustadt
- 2024-2025: HB Ludwigsburg
- 2025-: BSV Sachsen Zwickau
National team
Years	Team	Apps	(Gls)
2021–	Poland	11	(4)
- Updated on 9 July 2024

Julia Niewiadomska (born 11 February 2002) is a Polish handballer for HB Ludwigsburg and the Polish national team.

She participated at the 2021 World Women's Handball Championship in Spain, placing 15th.
