= Kim Irion =

German handball player (born 1991)

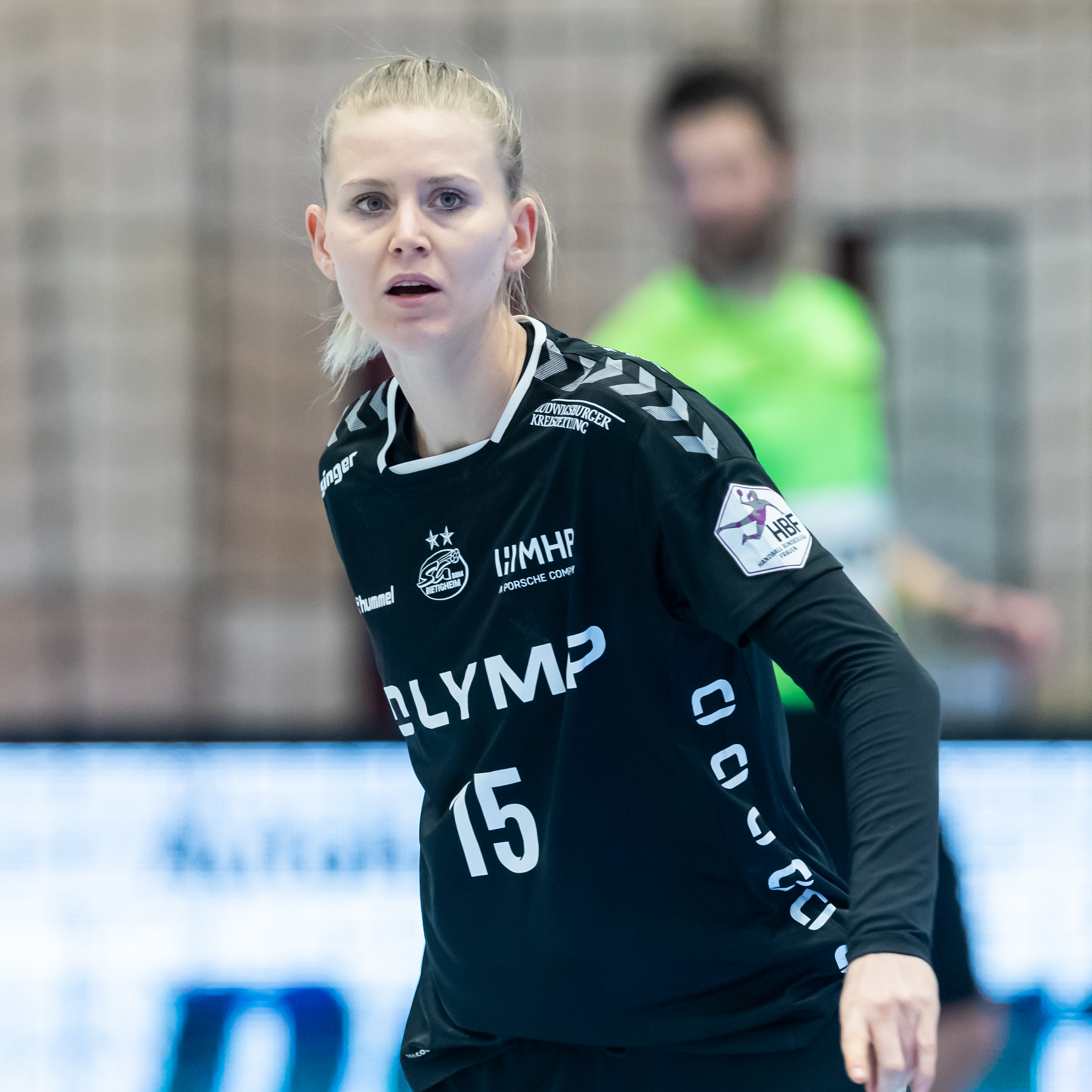

Personal information
- Nationality: German
- Born: 6 April 1991 (age 35) Gelnhausen, Germany
- Height: 1.85 m (6 ft 1 in)

Sport
- Sport: Handball
- Position: Centre back
- Current club: HSG Bensheim/Auerbach
- Number: 25

Youth career
- Years: Team
- –: TV Langenselbold
- –2007: TGS Walldorf

Senior clubs
- Years: Team
- 2007–2008: TSG Ober-Eschbach
- 2008–2011: HSG Bensheim/Auerbach
- 2011–2016: Bayer Leverkusen
- 2016–2023: SG BBM Bietigheim
- 2023–: HSG Bensheim/Auerbach
National team
Years	Team	Apps	(Gls)
2012–	Germany	118	(315)

Kim Irion (née Naidzinavicius; born 6 April 1991) is a German handball player for HSG Bensheim/Auerbach and the German national team.

== Achievements ==
- EHF European League:
  - Winner: 2022
- Bundesliga:
  - Winner: 2017, 2019, 2022, 2023
