= Andrea Jacobsen =

Icelandic handball player (born 1997)

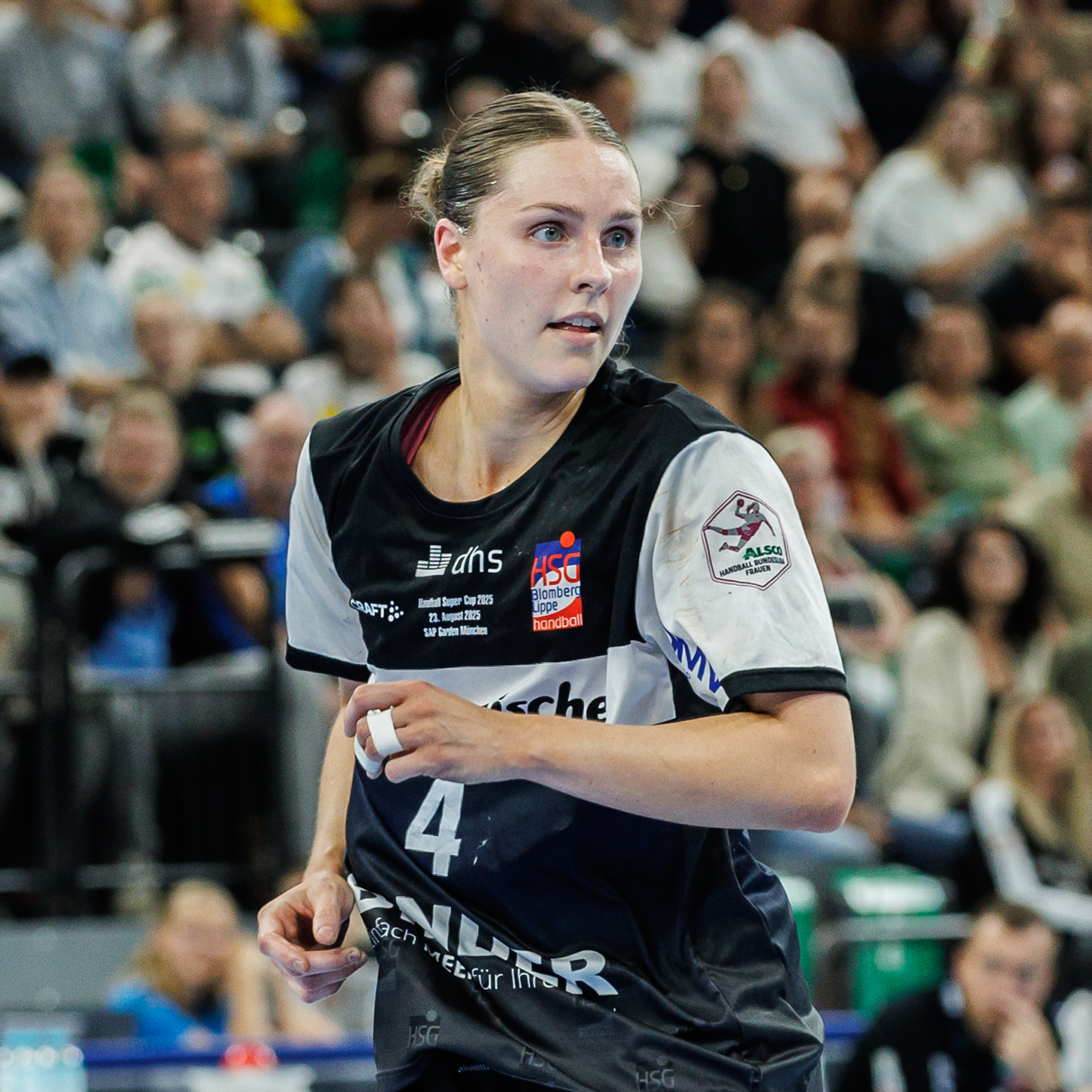
- Andrea Jacobsen in 2025

Personal information
- Nationality: Icelandic
- Born: 9 April 1998 (age 28) Reykjavík, Iceland
- Height: 1.81 m (5 ft 11 in)

Sport
- Sport: Handball
- Position: Left back
- Current club: ÍBV

Senior clubs
- Years: Team
- -2018: Ungmennafélagið Fjölnir
- 2018-2022: Kristianstad HK
- 2022-2023: EH Aalborg
- 2023-2024: Silkeborg-Voel KFUM
- 2024-2026: HSG Blomberg-Lippe
- 2026-: ÍBV
National team
Years	Team	Apps	(Gls)
2017–	Iceland	66	(116)
- Updated on 7 November 2025

Andrea Jacobsen (born 9 April 1998) is an Icelandic handball player for the Icelandic national team and ÍBV.

== Career ==
Jacobsen started playing handball at the Icelandic team Ungmennafélagið Fjölnir, where she helped the team getting promoted to the besta deild kvenna in 2017. In 2018 she joined Swedish team Kristianstad HK.

When her former partner Teitur Örn Einarsson signed for SG Flensburg-Handewitt, she started to look for a team closer to Flensburg. Therefore, she signed for the Danish team EH Aalborg in the Danish second tier. In 2023 she joined Danish top league team Silkeborg-Voel KFUM. Here she played for a single season before joined German Bundesliga team HSG Blomberg-Lippe in 2024. With the club she reached the Final Four of the EHF European League in her first season.

== National team ==
Jacobsen played with the Icelandic youth team at the 2018 Women's Junior World Handball Championship, where Iceland finished 10th and Jacobsen scored 10 goals.

In 2017 she made her debut for the Icelandic national team.

She represented Iceland at the 2023 World Women's Handball Championship, where Iceland finished 25th. Jacobsen scored 6 goals during the tournament. She represented Iceland again two years later at the 2025 World Women's Handball Championship.
