= Monz =

Monz is a surname. Notable people with this surname include:

- Anna Monz (born 1989), German handball player
- Mauro Monz (born 1974), American football player
