= Toni-Luisa Reinemann =

German handball player (born 2001)

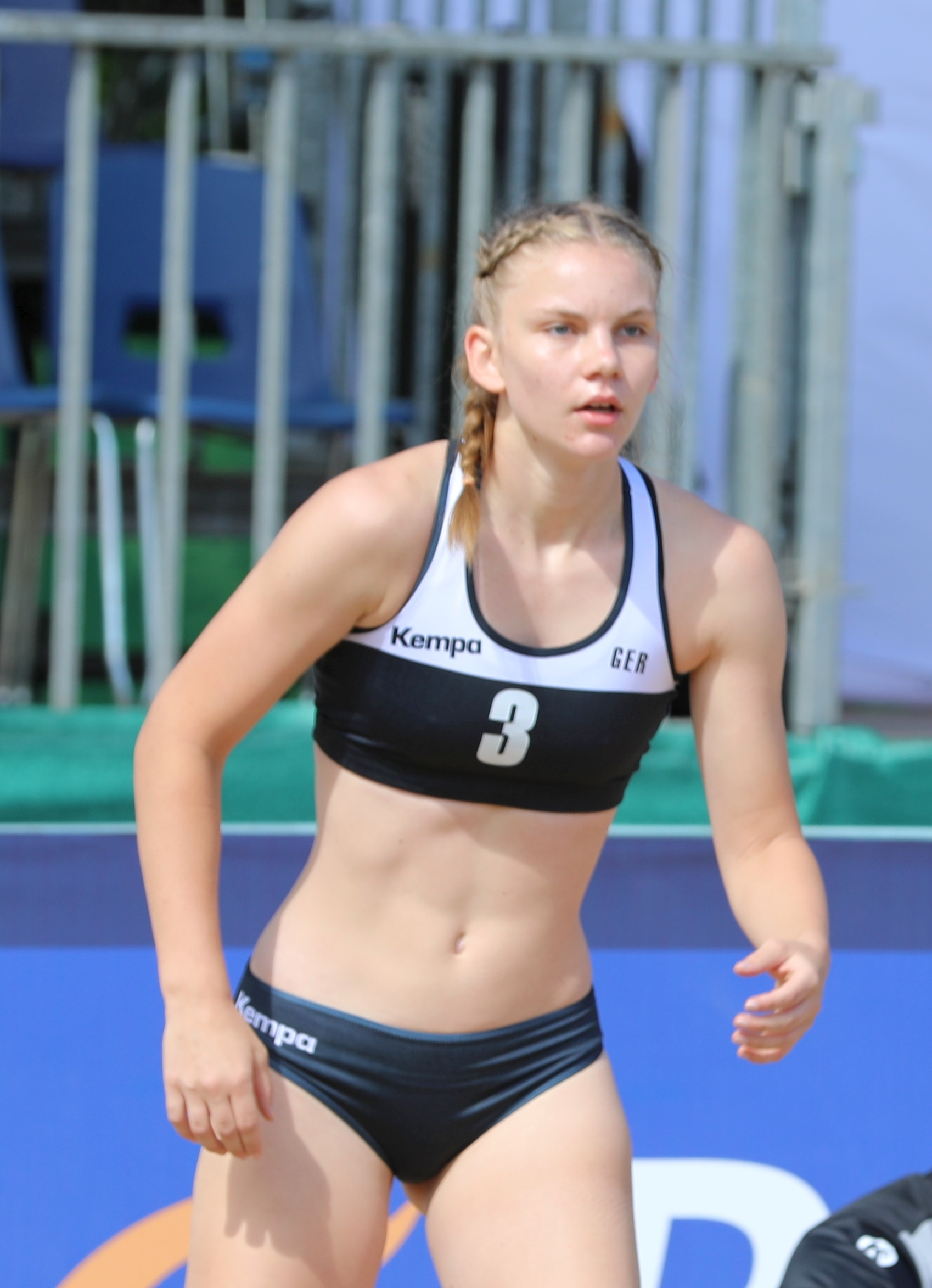
- Reinemann in 2019

Personal information
- Nationality: German
- Born: 31 May 2001 (age 25) Helmstadt, Germany
- Height: 1.78 m (5 ft 10 in)

Sport
- Sport: Handball
- Position: Centre back
- Current club: VfL Oldenburg
- Number: 29

Senior clubs
- Years: Team
- 2014–2015: JSG Wey/Ta/Fall
- 2015–2016: JSG Allertal
- 2016–: VfL Oldenburg
National team
Years	Team	Apps	(Gls)
2023-	Germany	11	(7)
–	Germany Beach		
- Updated on 21 August 2024

Toni-Luisa Reinemann (born 31 May 2001) is a German handball player for VfL Oldenburg in the Frauen Handball-Bundesliga and the German national team.

Reinemann represented the Germany women's national beach handball team, where she participated at the 2019 European Beach Handball Championship, placing 10th. At the tournament, she became the team's top scorer with 62 points.

In the 2019–20 season, Reinemann became part of the first team in VfL Oldenburg, due to various injuries on the team. In October 2019, she signed a professional contract with the club.

In December 2022, she was nominated for a German Handball Award Women among 10 other players, but didn't win.

She debuted for the German national team on October 12th, 2023. Her first major international tournament was at the 2023 World Championship, where she finished 6th with the German team.

== Achievements ==
- German Cup
  - Winner: 2018
  - Runner-up: 2022
