= German Handball Association =

National handball association of Germany

German Handball Association German: Deutscher Handballbund DHB
- IOC nation: Federal Republic of Germany (GER)
- Sport: Handball
- Other sports: Beach handball; Wheelchair handball
- Official website: www.dhb.de

HISTORY
- Year of formation: 1 October 1949; 77 years ago

DEMOGRAPHICS
- Number of Handball clubs: 3,720 (as of 2026)
- Membership size: 765,368 (as of 2026)

AFFILIATIONS
- International federation: International Handball Federation (IHF)
- IHF member since: 1950; 76 years ago
- Continental association: European Handball Federation
- National Olympic Committee: German Olympic Sports Confederation

GOVERNING BODY
- President: Andreas Michelmann (Germany)

HEADQUARTERS
- Address: Willi-Daume-Haus Strobelallee 56 DE-44139 Dortmund, Arnsberg, North Rhine-Westphalia
- Country: Germany
- Secretary General: Mark Schober (Germany)

FINANCE
- Sponsors: Puma ® Harting; KÜS; DB; Opel; Deutsche Kreditbank; Atlas; Hella; Alsco; Lidl; Gerflor

The German Handball Association (German: Deutscher Handballbund) (DHB) is the national handball association of Germany. DHB organizes team handball within Germany and represents German handball internationally. The DHB headquarters are in Dortmund.

With around 700,000 individual members and 3,700 clubs, it is the largest handball federation in the world.

== History ==
It was founded on the 1st of October 1949. The association has been a member of the International Handball Federation (IHF) since 1950 and the European Handball Federation (EHF) since 1991, just after the country's re-unification.

Prior to 1991 handball in East Germany was governed by the Deutscher Handballverband, founded in 1958. In 1991 the two organizations were merged, and at the 1993 World Women's Handball Championship, the organization won their first title as a unified country.

== Presidents ==
Period	Head President
1949–1955	(Germany) Willi Daume
1955–1966	(Germany) Ernst Feick
1966–1972	(Germany) Otto Seeber
1972–1989	(Germany) Bernhard Thiele
1989–1993	(Germany) Hans-Jürgen Hinrichs
1993–1998	(Germany) Bernd Steinhauser
1998–2013	(Germany) Ulrich Strombach
2013–	(Germany) Bernhard Bauer

== Competitions ==
=== Men's Senior Competitions ===
- Handball-Bundesliga (Division 1)
- 2. Handball-Bundesliga (Division 2)
- German Handball Cup
- German Handball Super Cup

=== Women's Senior Competitions ===
- Women's Handball-Bundesliga (Division 1)
- 2. Women's Handball-Bundesliga (Division 2)
- Women's German Cup
