= Amelie Berger =

German handball player (born 1999)

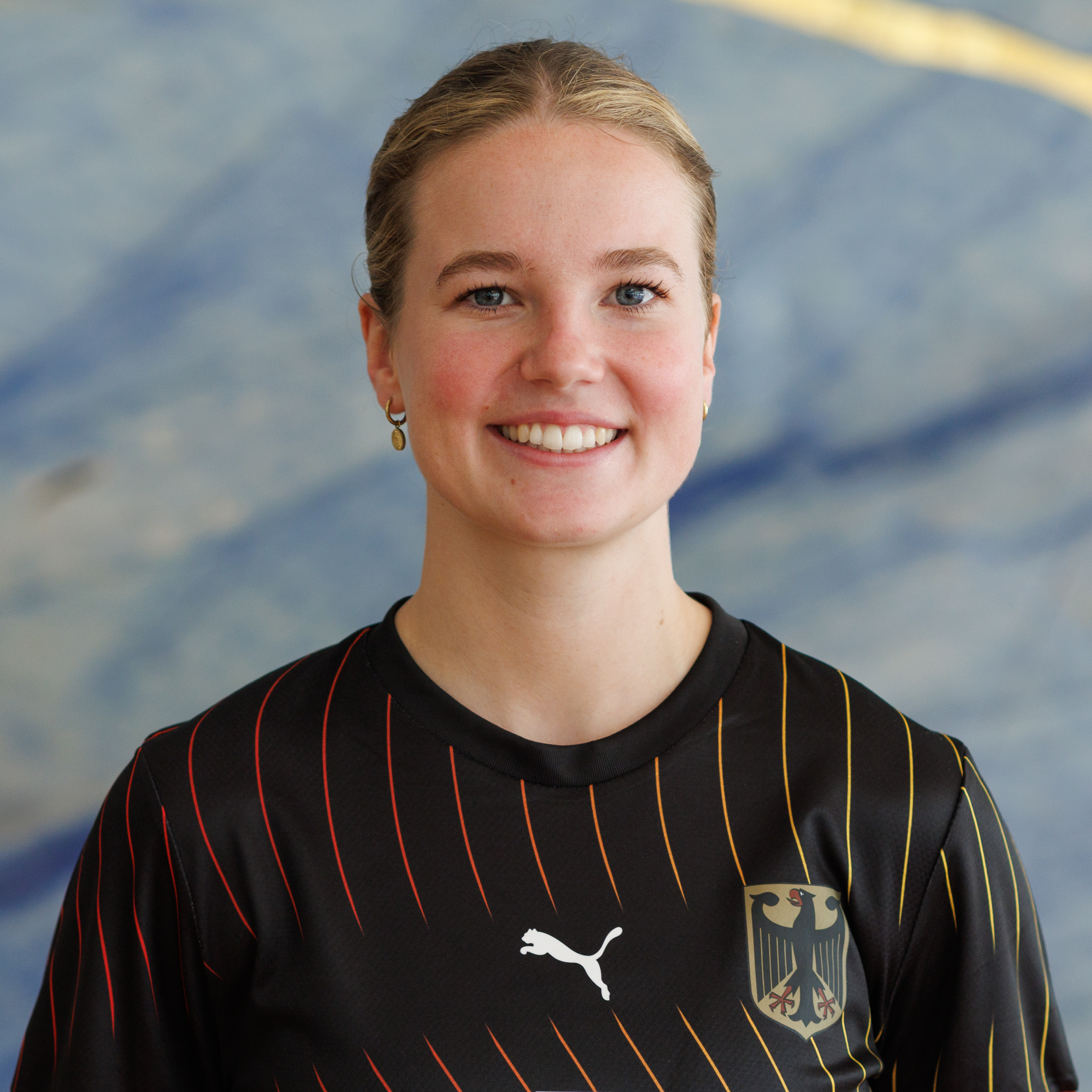

Personal information
- Nationality: German
- Born: 22 July 1999 (age 27) Tübingen, Germany
- Height: 1.69 m (5 ft 7 in)

Sport
- Sport: Handball
- Position: Right wing
- Current club: RK Podravka Koprivnica
- Number: 3

Youth career
- Years: Team
- –2015: SV 64 Zweibrücken
- 2015–2016: Bayer Leverkusen

Senior clubs
- Years: Team
- 2016–2019: Bayer Leverkusen
- 2019–2021: SG BBM Bietigheim
- 2021–2022: Borussia Dortmund
- 2022–2026: HSG Bensheim/Auerbach
- 2026–: RK Podravka Koprivnica
National team
Years	Team	Apps	(Gls)
2018–	Germany	67	(125)
- Updated on 31 December 2023

Amelie Berger (born 22 July 1999) is a German handball player for RK Podravka Koprivnica and the German national team.

She participated in the 2018 European Women's Handball Championship.
