= Meike Schmelzer =

German handball player (born 1993)

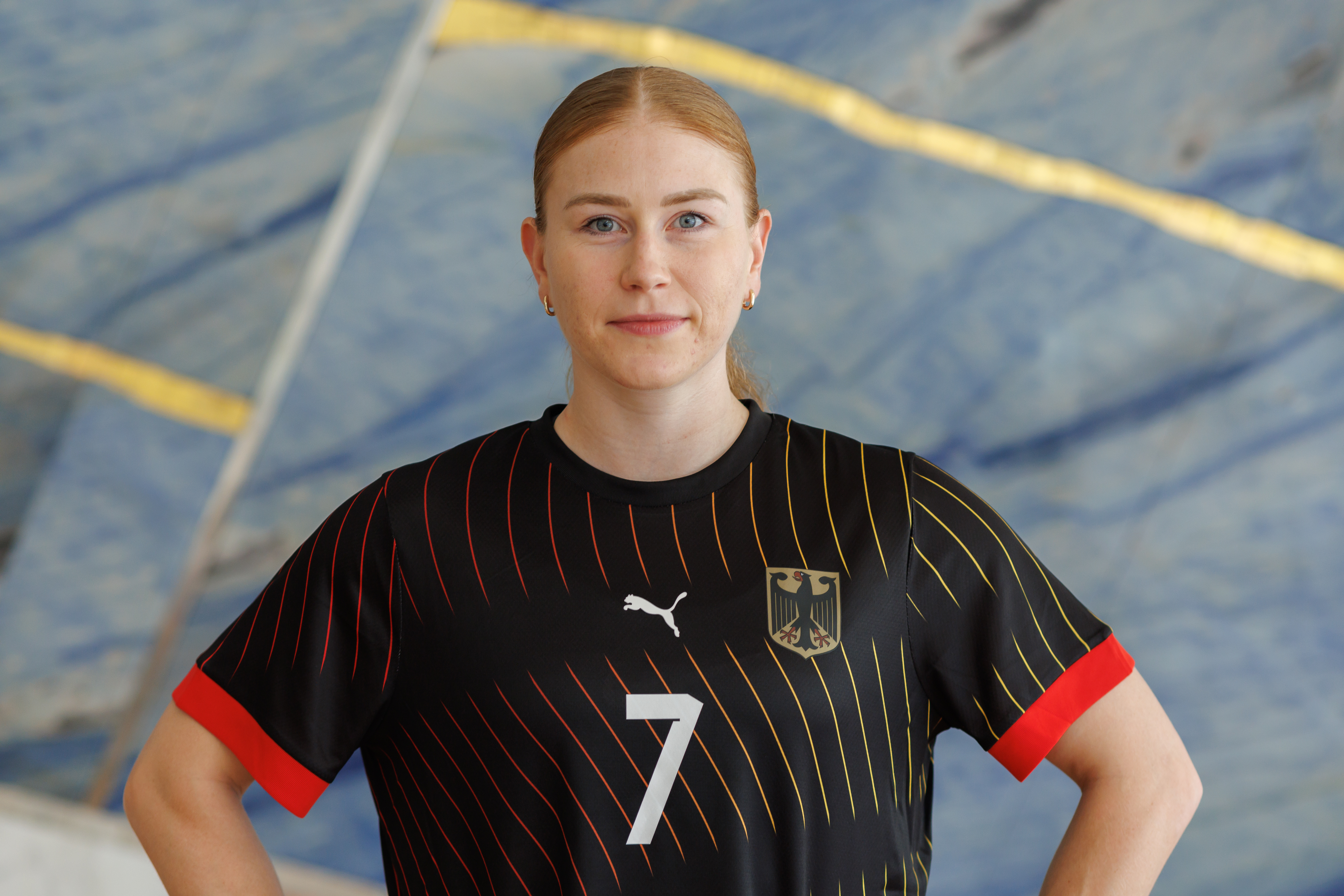

Personal information
- Nationality: German
- Born: 19 July 1993 (age 33) Wiesbaden, Germany
- Height: 1.80 m (5 ft 11 in)

Sport
- Sport: Handball
- Position: Pivot
- Current club: HSG Bensheim/Auerbach
- Number: 13

Youth career
- Years: Team
- –2007: HSC Ingelheim
- 2007–2009: Mainz 05

Senior clubs
- Years: Team
- 2009–2014: Mainz 05
- 2014: TuS Weibern
- 2014–2021: Thüringer HC
- 2021–2022: CS Gloria Bistrița-Năsăud
- 2022–2025: HC Dunărea Brăila
- 2025–: HSG Bensheim/Auerbach
National team
Years	Team	Apps	(Gls)
2015–	Germany	100	(133)
- Updated on 31. december 2023

Meike Schmelzer (born 10 July 1993) is a German handball player for HSG Bensheim/Auerbach and the German national team.
