= 2025–26 Handball-Bundesliga (women) =

Handball-Bundesliga Frauen
- Season: 2025–26
- Dates: 29 August 2025 – 6 June 2026
- Champions: HSG Blomberg-Lippe
- Relegated: HB Ludwigsburg
- Matches: 140
- Goals: 8,537 (60.98 per match)
- Top goalscorer: (Germany) Nina Engel (164 goals)
- Total attendance: 191356

The 2025–26 Handball-Bundesliga Frauen was the 50th season of Handball-Bundesliga Frauen, Germany's premier handball league.

On 22 July 2025, the defending champions HB Ludwigsburg declared their bankruptcy, resulting in them withdrawing from the league. Therefore, the league only consists of 11 teams for the 2025/26 season.

== Teams ==
Location of the Handball-Bundesliga Frauen 2025–26 teams

=== Team changes ===
Promoted from 2024–25 2. Handball-Bundesliga Frauen	Relegated from 2024–25 Handball-Bundesliga Frauen
SV Union Halle-Neustadt	Bayer 04 Leverkusen

=== Arenas ===
Team	Location	Arena	Capacity
Frisch Auf Göppingen	Göppingen	EWS Arena	5,600
Buxtehuder SV	Buxtehude	Neue Halle Nord	1,800
BSV Sachsen Zwickau	Zwickau	Sparkassen-Arena Zwickau	3,043
Thüringer HC	Bad Langensalza	Salza-Halle	1,100
HSG Bensheim/Auerbach	Bensheim	Weststadthalle	2,000
VfL Oldenburg	Oldenburg	EWE Arena	2,300
TuS Metzingen	Tübingen	Paul-Horn-Arena	3,132
Sport-Union Neckarsulm	Neckarsulm	Ballei-Sporthalle	1,500
HSG Blomberg-Lippe	Blomberg	Sporthalle an der Ulmenallee	1,300
Borussia Dortmund	Dortmund	Sporthalle Wellinghofen	2,500
SV Union Halle-Neustadt	Halle	SWH.arena	1,200

=== Personnel and kits ===
Club	Manager	Captain	Kit manufacturer
HSG Blomberg-Lippe	(Germany) Steffen Birkner	(Germany) Laura Rüffieux	(Italy) Erreà
VfL Oldenburg	(Germany) Niels Bötel	(Germany) Marie Steffen	(Germany) Adidas
Thüringer HC	(Germany) Herbert Müller	(Austria) Josefine Hanfland	(Japan) Mizuno
TuS Metzingen	(Germany) Miriam Hirsch	(Germany) Svenja Hübner and (Germany) Marie Weiss	(Germany) Kempa
BSV Sachsen Zwickau	(Germany) Norman Rentsch	(Hungary) Laura Szabó	(Spain) Joma
HSG Bensheim/Auerbach	(Germany) Ilka Fickinger	(Germany) Lisa Friedberger	(Germany) Kempa
Buxtehuder SV	(Denmark) Nicolaj Andersson	(Germany) Teresa von Prittwitz	(Germany) Kempa
Sport-Union Neckarsulm	(Germany) Thomas Zeitz	(Belgium) Munia Smits	(Germany) JAKO
Frisch Auf Göppingen	(Germany) Nico Kiener	(Germany) Louisa de Bellis	(Germany) Kempa
Borussia Dortmund	(Netherlands) Henk Groener	(Germany) Alicia Langer	(Germany) Puma
SV Union Halle-Neustadt	(Germany) Ines Seidler	(Germany) Lea Gruber	(Denmark) Hummel

== Standings ==
Pos	Team	Pld	W	D	L	GF	GA	GD	Pts	Qualification or relegation
1	HSG Blomberg-Lippe	20	18	0	2	604	480	+124	36	Championship play-offs + advance to Champions League
2	Borussia Dortmund	20	17	1	2	702	583	+119	35	Championship play-offs
3	HSG Bensheim/Auerbach	20	14	0	6	681	631	+50	28	Championship play-offs
4	Thüringer HC	20	13	1	6	636	596	+40	27	Championship play-offs
5	VfL Oldenburg	20	8	2	10	551	544	+7	18	Relegation play-off to 2. Handball-Bundesliga
6	Sport-Union Neckarsulm	20	8	1	11	577	588	−11	17	Relegation play-off to 2. Handball-Bundesliga
7	TuS Metzingen	20	8	1	11	611	659	−48	17	Relegation play-off to 2. Handball-Bundesliga
8	BSV Sachsen Zwickau	20	5	1	14	540	605	−65	11	Relegation play-off to 2. Handball-Bundesliga
9	Frisch Auf Göppingen	20	4	3	13	602	656	−54	11	Relegation play-off to 2. Handball-Bundesliga
10	Buxtehuder SV	20	3	4	13	557	631	−74	10	Relegation play-off to 2. Handball-Bundesliga
11	SV Union Halle-Neustadt	20	5	0	15	575	663	−88	10	Relegation play-off to 2. Handball-Bundesliga

Updated to match(es) played on 4 April 2026. Source: HBLF
Rules for classification: 1) points; 2) goal difference; 3) goals scored; 4) head-to-head points; 5) head-to-head goal difference; 6) head-to-head number of goals scored.
