= Anna Monz =

German handball player (born 1989)

Personal information
- Full name: Anna Monz-Kühn
- Nationality: German
- Born: 8 December 1989 (age 36) Burghausen, Germany
- Height: 1.84 m (6 ft 0 in)

Sport
- Sport: Handball
- Position: Goalkeeper
- Current club: Retired

Youth career
- Years: Team
- –: Wacker Burghausen

Senior clubs
- Years: Team
- 2006-2012: DJK/MJC Trier
- 2012-2020: HSG Blomberg-Lippe
National team
| Years | Team | Apps | (Gls) |
| 2016-2020 | Germany | 3 | (1) |
- Updated on 9 May 2023

Anna Monz (born 8 December 1989) is a German former handball player who retired in 2020 while for HSG Blomberg-Lippe. She also featured the German national team.

She was selected as part of the German team for the 2017 World Women's Handball Championship.

== Career ==
Monz started her career in 2006 at the Handball-Bundesliga team DJK/MJC Trier. Before she had played for SV Wacker Burghausen. In 2012-13 she joined HSG Blomberg-Lippe.

She debuted for the national team on 17 March 2016 during a four team tournament in Oslo, Norway. During this minitournament should would play all three matches, she would ever play on the German national team within three days.

In January 2020 she announced that this season would be her last.

After her playing days she has worked as a goalkeeping coach since July 2023.
