= Lena Degenhardt =

German handball player (born 1999)

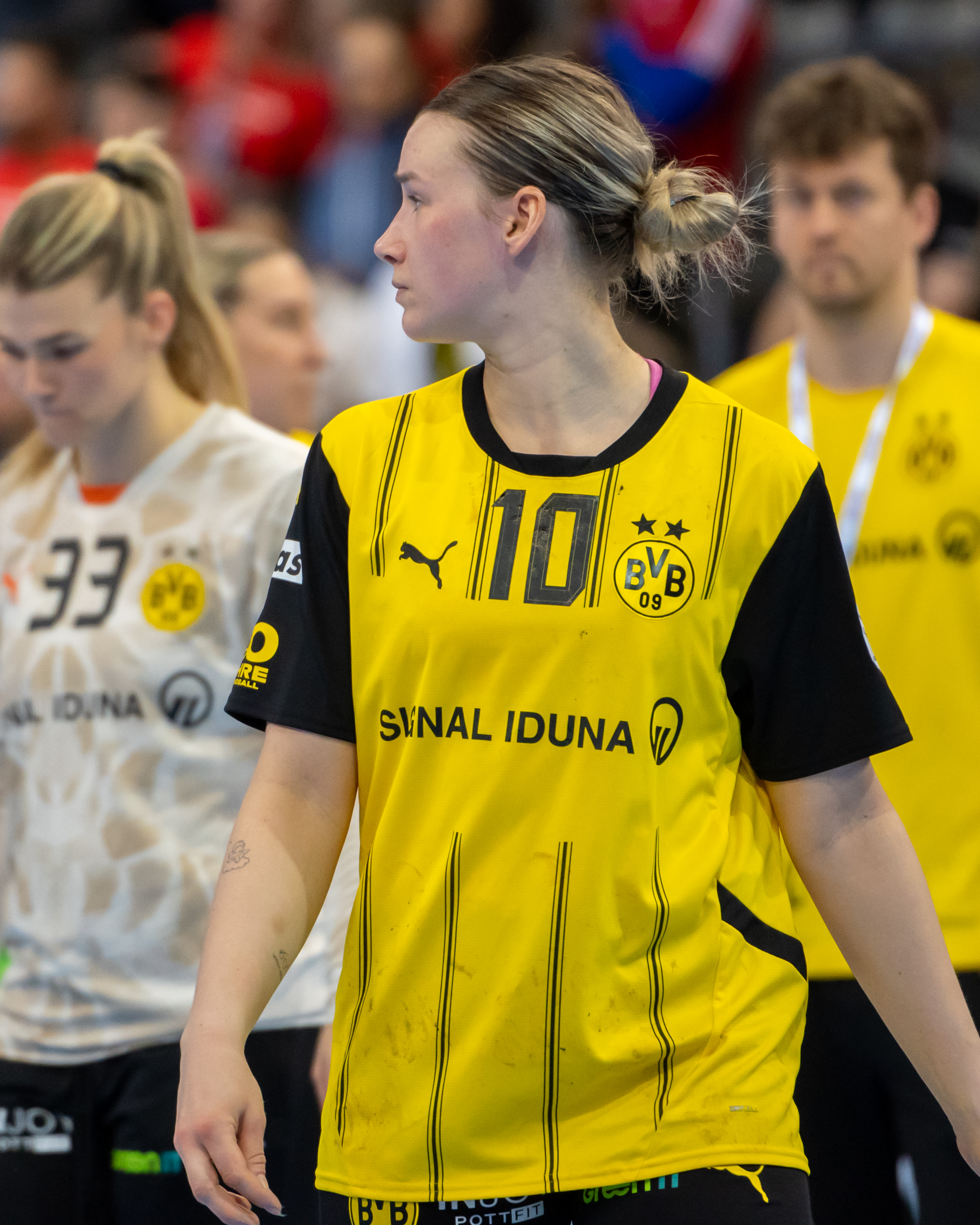

Personal information
- Nationality: German
- Born: 31 May 1999 (age 27) Albstadt, Germany
- Height: 1.78 m (5 ft 10 in)

Sport
- Sport: Handball
- Position: Left back
- Current club: HSG Bensheim/Auerbach
- Number: 10

Senior clubs
- Years: Team
- 2015-2016: VfL Pfullingen
- 2016-2017: SG H2Ku Herrenberg
- 2017-2019: TV Nellingen
- 2019–2023: TuS Metzingen
- 2023–2025: Borussia Dortmund
- 2025–: HSG Bensheim/Auerbach
National team
Years	Team	Apps	(Gls)
2021–	Germany	17	(11)
- Updated on 21 August 2025

Lena Sophia Degenhardt (born 31 May 1999) is a German female handball player for HSG Bensheim/Auerbach and the German national team.

She represented Germany at the 2021 World Women's Handball Championship in Spain.
