= VfL Oldenburg (handball) =

German handball club

- Full name: VfL Oldenburg GmbH
- Founded: September 21, 1894; 131 years ago
- Arena: EWE Arena
- Capacity: 2,300
- President: Peter Görgen
- Head coach: Niels Bötel
- League: Bundesliga
- 2025–26: 5th
| Home | Away |

VfL Oldenburg is a German women's handball club from the town of Oldenburg, Lower Saxony. It is part of the broader sports club VfL Oldenburg, which also plays soccer, badminton and American football.

== Honours ==
- German Cup
  - Winners (4): 1981, 2009, 2012, 2018
- German Supercup
  - Winners (1): 2009
- EHF Challenge Cup
  - Winners (1): 2008

== European record ==
| Season | Competition | Round | Club | 1st leg | 2nd leg | Aggregate |
|---|---|---|---|---|---|---|
| 2022–23 | EHF European League | Round 2 | (Austria) Hypo Niederösterreich | 37–26 | 24–23 | 57–46 |
| 2022–23 | EHF European League | Round 3 | (France) Neptunes de Nantes | 27–34 | 24–35 | 51–69 |

== Team ==
=== Current squad ===
Squad for the 2026-26 season

Goalkeepers

- 25 (Germany) Madita Kohorst
- 31 (Germany) Alexandra Humpert

Wingers
RW

- 26 (Netherlands) Pam Korsten
- 30 (Germany) Jenny Behrend

LW

- 3 (Germany) Lana Teiken
- 13 (Germany) Jane Martens

Line player

- 14 (Germany) Marie Steffen
- 20 (Germany) Ariane Pfundstein

Back players
LB

- 4 (Germany) Toni-Luisa Reinemann
- 29 (Germany) Paulina Golla
- 44 (Germany) Lisa-Marie Fragge

CB

- 21 (Poland) Joanna Granicka
- 22 (Germany) Lotta Röpcke
- 24 (Switzerland) Laurentia Wolff

RB

- 2 (Germany) Lisa Borutta
- 34 (Switzerland) Emma Bächtiger

=== Transfers ===
Transfers for the 2026-27 season.

Joining

- (Germany) Lilly Janßen (GK) (from loan return (Germany) BSV Sachsen Zwickau)
- (Germany) Julika Birnkammer (RB) (from (Germany) ESV 1927 Regensburg)
- (Germany) Lara Müller (LB) (from (Germany) Borussia Dortmund)

Leaving

- (Germany) Lisa Borutta (RB) (from (France) Toulon Métropole Var Handball)
- (Germany) Alexandra Humpert (GK) (from (Germany) BSV Sachsen Zwickau)
- (Germany) Jane Martens (LW) (retires)
- (Germany) Marie Steffen (LP) (to (Romania) CS Rapid Bucureşti)
- (Netherlands) Pam Korsten (RW) (to (Germany) Borussia Dortmund)
- (Germany) Lotta Röpcke (CB) (from (Germany) TuS Metzingen)
