= Viktória Woth =

Hungarian handball player

Viktória Woth is a Hungarian handball player who plays for TuS Metzingen.

== Handball career ==
Viktória Woth played at youth level with the Hungarian club Haladás VSE until 2015, after which she switched to Szombathelyi KKA. In the summer of 2017, Woth moved to the Nemzeti Kézilabda Akadémia (NEKA for short), a national handball academy.

The first team of NEKA has regularly competed in the Nemzeti Bajnokság I/B. For the 2020–21 season they signed an agreement with Szent István SE that the two teams would unite and compete as one team in the Nemzeti Bajnokság I under the name Boglári Akadémia-SZISE. In the 2020/21 season, Woth played 11 second division games for NEKA and 20 first division games for Boglári Akadémia-SZISE. In the summer of 2021, she moved to Borussia Dortmund Handball.

Woth won the U-16 European Open 2018 with the Hungarian youth national team. She contributed four goals to the success. The following year she won the title at the European U-17 Championship.
