= TuS Metzingen =

German handball club

- Full name: Turn- und Sportvereinigung Metzingen
- Short name: TusSies
- Founded: 1861
- Arena: Paul Horn-Arena, Tübingen
- Capacity: 3,132
- President: Ferenc Rott
- Head coach: Miriam Hirsch
- League: Handball-Bundesliga
- 2025–26: 6th
- Club colours
Home	Away

TuS Metzingen is a German women's handball team from Metzingen and Baden-Württemberg. It currently competes in the Frauen Handball-Bundesliga since 2012.

In the 2016–17 season Tus Metzingen broke the attendance record in the Bundesliga, when 6,157 spectators watched their home match against TV Nellingen.

== Kits ==
HOME
2014–15	2015–16	2017–18

== Honours ==
- Handball-Bundesliga Frauen:
  - Runners-Up: 2016
  - Bronze: 2015, 2017, 2019, 2020, 2021
- German Cup:
  - Winners: 2024
- EHF Cup:
  - Finalists: 2015–16

== European record ==
Season	Competition	Round	Club	1st leg	2nd leg	Aggregate
2016–17	EHF Cup	R2	(Czech Republic) Baník Most	30–22	29–25	59–47
2016–17	EHF Cup	R3	(Turkey) Yenimahalle	27–33	36–23	63–56
2016–17	EHF Cup	Group D	(Denmark) Nykøbing Falster	29–34	36–36	2nd place
2016–17	EHF Cup	Group D	(Russia) Lada Togliatti	23–24	27–26	2nd place
2016–17	EHF Cup	Group D	(Norway) Glassverket	39–17	22–16	2nd place
2016–17	EHF Cup	1/4	(France) Nantes	27–23	31–28	58–51
2016–17	EHF Cup	1/2	(Russia) Rostov-Don	18–29	21–31	39–60

== Team ==
=== Current squad ===
Squad for the 2025–26 season

Goalkeepers

- 12 (Germany) Marie Weiss
- 77 (Hungary) Sára Suba

Wingers
LW

- 2 (Germany) Selina Kalmbach

RW

- 7 (Germany) Sabrina Tröster

Line players

- 26 (Germany) Svenja Hübner
- 8 (Germany) Ida Petzold
- 00 (Germany) Svenja Demmel

Back players
LB

- 9 (Germany) Naina Klein
- 96 (Czech Republic) Charlotte Cholevová
- 56 (Germany) Carolin Hübner
- 18 (Austria) Santina Sabatnig

CB

- 15 (Germany) Katharina Goldammer
- 19 (Hungary) Johanna Farkas

RB

- 22 (Brazil) Gabriela Bitolo
- 00 (Austria) Klara Schlegel

=== Transfers ===
Transfers for the 2026–27 season

Joining

- (Germany) Mareike Kusian (RW) (from (Germany) Borussia Dortmund)
- (Switzerland) Charlotte Kähr (LB) (from (Germany) BSV Sachsen Zwickau)
- (Germany) Lotta Röpcke (CB) (from (Germany) VfL Oldenburg)

Leaving

- (Germany) Sabrina Tröster (RW) (to (Germany) Thüringer HC)
- (Austria) Klara Schlegel (RB) (to (Romania) CS Rapid Bucureşti)
- (Germany) Nele Franz (CB) (to (Germany) Buxtehuder SV)
- (Netherlands) Loïs van Vliet (LW) (to (Germany) SV Union Halle-Neustadt)
- (Germany) Selina Lindemann (LW) (retires)

=== Notable former players ===
- (Germany) Anna Loerper
- (Germany) Julia Behnke
- (Germany) Ewgenija Minevskaja
- (Germany) Lena Degenhardt
- (Germany) Ina Großmann
- (Germany) Nicole Roth
- (Germany) Isabell Roch
- (Germany) Madita Kohorst
- (Germany) Marlene Zapf
- (Germany) Laetitia Quist
- (Germany) Silje Brøns Petersen
- (Germany) Maren Weigel
- (Hungary) Bernadett Temes
- (Hungary) Luca Szekerczés
- (Hungary) Annamária Ilyés
- (Hungary) Júlia Hársfalvi
- (Hungary) Dorina Korsós
- (Hungary) Anna Albek
- (Hungary) Viktória Woth
- (Netherlands) Delaila Amega
- (Netherlands) Jasmina Janković
- (Netherlands) Kelly Vollebregt
- (Netherlands) Tamara Haggerty
- (Netherlands) Jesse van de Polder
- (Netherlands) Bo van Wetering
- (Poland) Monika Kobylińska
- (Poland) Katarzyna Janiszewska
- (Poland) Dagmara Nocun
- (Austria) Patrícia Kovács
- (Austria) Katarina Pandza
- (Sweden) Madeleine Östlund
- (Sweden) Elinore Johansson
- (Norway) Tonje Løseth
- (Denmark) Simone Cathrine Petersen
- (Iceland) Sandra Erlingsdóttir
- (Italy) Anika Niederwieser
- (Switzerland) Lea Schüpbach
