= Madita Kohorst =

German handball player (born 1996)

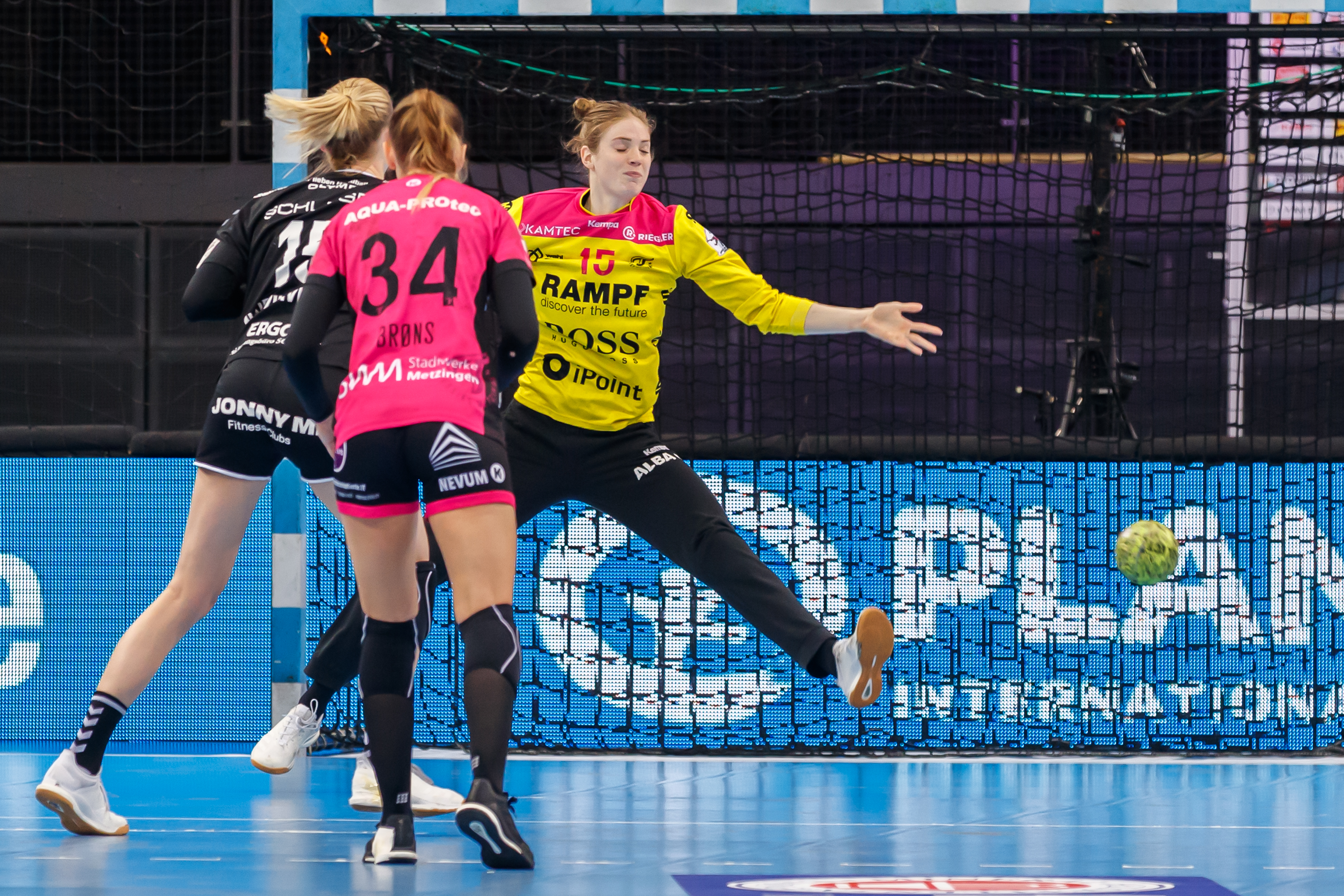

Personal information
- Nationality: German
- Born: 14 October 1996 (age 30) Lohne, Germany
- Height: 185 cm (73 in)

Sport
- Sport: Handball
- Position: Goalkeeper
- Current club: VfL Oldenburg
- Number: 25
National team
- Years: Team
- –: Germany

Madita Kohorst (born 14 October 1996) is a German handball player for TuS Metzingen and the German national team.

She was selected as part of the German team for the 2017 World Women's Handball Championship.
