= HSG Blomberg-Lippe =

German handball club

- Full name: HSG Blomberg-Lippe Bundesliga GmbH
- Founded: 1993; 33 years ago
- Arena: Schulzentrum Blomberg
- Capacity: 900
- Head coach: Steffen Birkner
- League: Bundesliga
- 2025–26: 1st (Champions)
- Club colours
| Home | Away |

HSG Blomberg-Lippe is a German women's handball club, that competes in the Handball-Bundesliga Frauen since their promotion in 2006. They play their home matches in Schulzentrum Blomberg, which have capacity for 900 spectators. They play in blue shirts and black shorts.

== History ==
HSG Blomberg-Lippe was formed in 1993 as a fusion of the two clubs TV Herrentrup and TV Blomberg.

=== TV Herrentrup ===
TV Herrentrup was formed in 1905 and played women's handball from 1972 onwards. In 1986 they were promoted to the 3rd tier, and in 1989 they were promoted to the 2nd Bundesliga.

=== TV Blomberg ===
TV Blomberg was formed in 1886.

=== HSG Blomberg-Lippe ===
When the two clubs fused HSG Blomberg-Lippe took over the license of TV Herrentrup and could thus start in the 2nd Bundesliga. After 2 seasons of finishing 2nd, the team was promoted in the 1995-96 season. They were relegated again in the 2001-02 season. In 2003-04 and 2004-05 they finished 2nd in the 2nd tier, and in 2005-06 they were promoted to the Bundesliga after beating SC Markranstädt in the playoff.

From January 2008 until 2010 the club was known as ProVital Blomberg-Lippe for sponsorship reasons.

In 2010 they reached the final of the DHB-Pokal, where they lost to Bayer Leverkusen. Four years later they were once again in the final, this time losing to HC Leipzig.

== Kits ==
Home
| 2014-15 | 2017-18 | 2018-19 | 2020- |

Away
| 2017-18 | 2018-19 |

== Honours ==
=== Domestic competitions ===
- Handball-Bundesliga Frauen:
  - Champions : 2026

== Team ==
=== Current squad ===
Squad for the 2026-27 season

Goalkeepers

- 16 (Germany) Melanie Veith
- 27 (Germany) Lara Lepschi
- 61 (Germany) Nicole Roth

Wings
RW

- 22 (Germany) Judith Tietjen
- 55 (Germany) Farrelle Njinkeu

LW

- 31 (Germany) Alexia Hauf
- 25 (Germany) Lilli Röpcke

Pivot

- 3 (Germany) Laura Rüffieux
- 10 (Germany) Maxi Mühlner

Back players
LB

- 9 (Germany) Nieke Kühne
- 81 (Poland) Karolina Jureńczyk
- 19 (Czech Republic) Eliška Desortová

CB

- 33 (Iceland) Elín Rósa Magnúsdóttir
- 21 (Switzerland) Nuria Bucher

RB

- 7 (Iceland) Diana Dögg Magnusdottir
- 28 (Sweden) Malin Sandberg

=== Transfers ===
Transfers for the season 2026–27

Joining

- (Germany) Lilli Röpcke (LW) (from (Germany) SV Union Halle-Neustadt)
- (Poland) Karolina Jureńczyk (LB) (from (Poland) Zagłębie Lubin)
- (Czech Republic) Eliška Desortová (LB) (from (Slovakia) HC DAC Dunajská Streda)

Leaving

- (Spain) Ona Vegué i Pena (LW) (to (Germany) Borussia Dortmund)
- (Iceland) Andrea Jacobsen (LB) (to (Iceland) ÍBV)
- (Netherlands) Amber Verbraeken (RW) (to (Germany) Sport-Union Neckarsulm)
- (Germany) Carolin Jaron (CB) (to (Germany) TG Nürtingen)
- (Germany) Malina Marie Michalczik (CB) (still unknown)

Transfers for the season 2027-28

Joining

Leaving

- (Germany) Nieke Kühne (LB) (to (Denmark) Odense Håndbold)

== Results ==
| Season | League | Rank | Games | Goals | Diff. | Points |
|---|---|---|---|---|---|---|
| 1993/94 | 2. Bundesliga Mitte | 4 | 20 | 380:334 | +46 | 23:17 |
| 1994/95 | 2. Bundesliga Süd | 4 | 26 | 489:468 | +21 | 32:20 |
| 1995/96 | 2. Bundesliga Süd | 1 | 26 | 562:470 | +92 | 41:11 |
| 1996/97 | Bundesliga | 9 | 22 | 456:489 | −33 | 17:27 |
| 1997/98 | Bundesliga | 6 | 22 | 522:519 | +3 | 22:22 |
| 1998/99 | Bundesliga | 9 | 22 | 511:556 | −45 | 17:27 |
| 1999/2000 | Bundesliga | 10 | 22 | 504:540 | −36 | 10:34 |
| 2000/01 | Bundesliga | 9 | 22 | 544:550 | −6 | 17:27 |
| 2001/02 | Bundesliga | 13 | 26 | 652:763 | −111 | 11:41 |
| 2002/03 | 2. Bundesliga Nord | 3 | 26 | 742:670 | +72 | 35:17 |
| 2003/04 | 2. Bundesliga Nord | 2 | 26 | 848:691 | +157 | 39:13 |
| 2004/05 | 2. Bundesliga Nord | 2 | 28 | 857:701 | +156 | 44:12 |
| 2005/06 | 2. Bundesliga Nord | 1 | 26 | 860:619 | +241 | 48:4 |
| 2006/07 | Bundesliga | 8 | 22 | 573:686 | −113 | 14:30 |
| 2007/08 | Bundesliga | 9 | 22 | 617:682 | −65 | 14:30 |
| 2008/09 | Bundesliga | 7 | 22 | 608:606 | +2 | 19:25 |
| 2009/10 | Bundesliga | 4 | 22 | 617:564 | +53 | 28:16 |
| 2010/11 | Bundesliga | 8 | 22 | 665:645 | +20 | 19:25 |
| 2011/12 | Bundesliga | 8 | 20 | 554:557 | −3 | 16:24 |
| 2012/13 | Bundesliga | 8 | 22 | 577:630 | −53 | 15:29 |
| 2013/14 | Bundesliga | 9 | 22 | 581:625 | −44 | 16:28 |
| 2014/15 | Bundesliga | 7 | 26 | 725:661 | +64 | 31:21 |
| 2015/16 | Bundesliga | 9 | 26 | 740:745 | −5 | 21:31 |
| 2016/17 | Bundesliga | 9 | 26 | 701:730 | −29 | 20:32 |
| 2017/18 | Bundesliga | 8 | 26 | 723:698 | +25 | 32:20 |
| 2018/19 | Bundesliga | 6 | 26 | 689:681 | +8 | 28:24 |
| 2019/20 | Bundesliga | 4 | 18 | 527:490 | +37 | 26:10 |
| 2020/21 | Bundesliga | 5 | 30 | 880:810 | +70 | 43:17 |
| 2021/22 | Bundesliga | 6 | 26 | 726:740 | −14 | 28:24 |
| 2022/23 | Bundesliga | 5 | 26 | 774:729 | +45 | 33:19 |
| 2023/24 | Bundesliga | 6 | 26 | 743:702 | +41 | 32:20 |
| 2024/25 | Bundesliga | 2 | 22 | 620:540 | +80 | 31:13 |
| 2025/26 | Bundesliga | 1 | 20 | 604:480 | +124 | 36:4 |
