= DHB-Pokal (women) =

Elimination handball tournament held annually in Germany

- Sport: Handball
- Founded: 1974; 52 years ago
- Administrator: DHB
- Country: Germany
- Most recent champion: Borussia Dortmund (2025–26)
- Most titles: Bayer 04 Leverkusen (9 titles)
- International cup: EHF Cup
- Website: Official website

The DHB-Pokal Frauen (English: German Women's Handball Federation Cup) is an elimination handball tournament held annually in Germany. It is the second most important handball national title in the country after the Handball-Bundesliga championship.

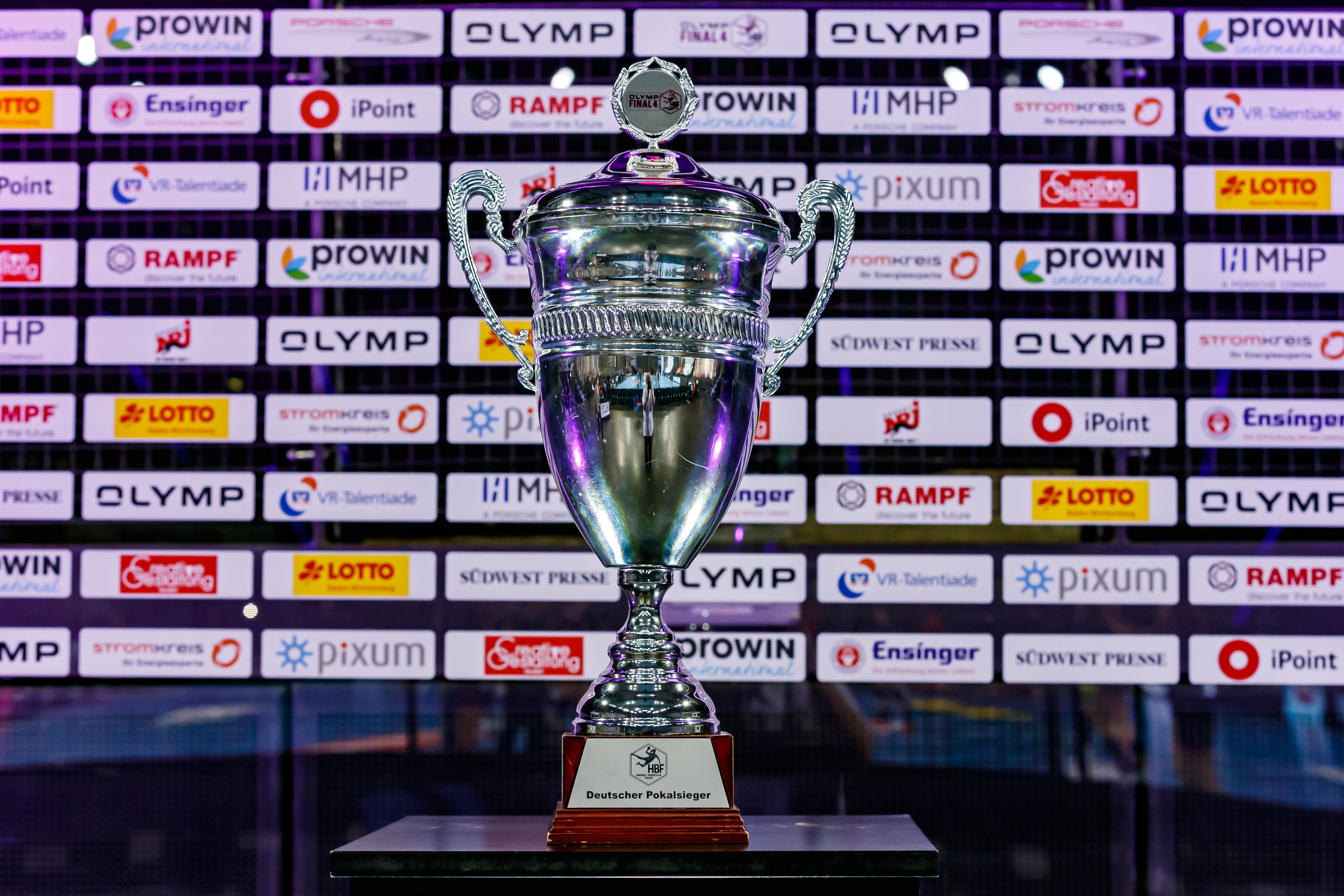
The 2021 Trophy

Since 1994 the tournament has ended in a final four event.

== Previous winners ==
Year	Winner	Year	Winner	Year	Winner	Year	Winner
1975	TSV GutsMuths Berlin	1988	VfL Engelskirchen	2001	TV Mainzlar	2014	HC Leipzig
1976	TSV GutsMuths Berlin	1989	TV Lützellinden	2002	Bayer 04 Leverkusen	2015	Buxtehuder SV
1977	TuS Eintracht Minden	1990	TV Lützellinden	2003	FHC Frankfurt (Oder)	2016	HC Leipzig
1978	TuS Eintracht Minden	1991	Bayer 04 Leverkusen	2004	1. FC Nürnberg	2017	Buxtehuder SV
1979	TSV GutsMuths Berlin	1992	TV Lützellinden	2005	1. FC Nürnberg	2018	VfL Oldenburg
1980	Bayer 04 Leverkusen	1993	TuS Walle Bremen	2006	HC Leipzig	2019	Thüringer HC
1981	VfL Oldenburg	1994	TuS Walle Bremen	2007	HC Leipzig	2020	No champion
1982	Bayer 04 Leverkusen	1995	TuS Walle Bremen	2008	HC Leipzig	2021	SG BBM Bietigheim
1983	Bayer 04 Leverkusen	1996	VfB Leipzig	2009	VfL Oldenburg	2022	SG BBM Bietigheim
1984	Bayer 04 Leverkusen	1997	Borussia Dortmund	2010	Bayer 04 Leverkusen	2023	SG BBM Bietigheim
1985	Bayer 04 Leverkusen	1998	TV Lützellinden	2011	Thüringer HC	2024	TuS Metzingen
1986	VfL Engelskirchen	1999	TV Lützellinden	2012	VfL Oldenburg	2025	HB Ludwigsburg
1987	Bayer 04 Leverkusen	2000	HC Leipzig	2013	Thüringer HC	2026	Borussia Dortmund

=== Most titles ===
Team	Number of titles	year
Bayer 04 Leverkusen	9	1980, 1982, 1983, 1984, 1985, 1987, 1991, 2002, 2010
HC Leipzig	7	1996, 2000, 2006, 2007, 2008, 2014, 2016
TV Lützellinden	5	1989, 1990, 1992, 1998, 1999
VfL Oldenburg	4	1981, 2009, 2012, 2018
TuS Walle Bremen	3	1993, 1994, 1995
TSV GutsMuths Berlin	3	1975, 1976, 1979
Thüringer HC	3	2011, 2013, 2019
1. FC Nürnberg	2	2004, 2005
TuS Eintracht Minden	2	1997, 1978
VfL Engelskirchen	2	1986, 1988
Buxtehuder SV	2	2015, 2017
SG BBM Bietigheim	2	2021, 2022
Borussia Dortmund	2	1997, 2026
FHC Frankfurt (Oder)	1	2003
TV Mainzlar	1	2001
HB Ludwigsburg	1	2025

== See also ==
- DHB-Pokal - Men's tournament
- Bundesliga
