= HSG Bensheim/Auerbach =

German handball team

- Full name: Handballspielgemeinschaft Bensheim/Auerbach
- Nickname: Flames
- Short name: HSG
- Founded: August 19, 1997; 28 years ago
- Arena: Weststadthalle, Bensheim
- Capacity: 2,000
- Chairman: Michael Geil
- Head coach: Ilka Fickinger
- League: Handball-Bundesliga
- 2025–26: 4th
- Club colours
Home	Away

HSG Bensheim/Auerbach is a German women's handball team from Bensheim, that competes in the 2025–26 Frauen Handball-Bundesliga and the 2025–26 EHF Women's European League.

In the 2023-24 season, the team finished second in the Frauen Handball-Bundesliga for the first time in the club's history, automatically qualifying for the 2024–25 Women's EHF European League. The team reached the quarterfinals of the tournament, after two defeats to French Jeanne d'Arc Dijon Handball.

Location of HSG Bensheim/Auerbach

== Honours ==
- Handball-Bundesliga:
  - Silver Medalist: (1) 2025
- DHB-Pokal:
  - Silver Medalist: (1) 2023
  - Bronze Medalist: (1) 2025
- 2. Bundesliga:
  - Winner: (1) 2019

== Team ==
=== Current squad ===
Squad for the 2025-26 season.

Goalkeepers

- 16 (Germany) Vanessa Fehr
- 36 (Netherlands) Helen van Beurden
- 77 (Germany) Marlene Wagner

Wings
RW

- 3 (Germany) Amelie Berger
- 71 (Germany) Jule Polsz

LW

- 15 (Germany) Ndidi Agwunedu
- 34 (Germany) Mia Ziercke
- 66 (Germany) Luisa Gürtelschmied

Pivot

- 5 (Germany) Isabell Hurst
- 23 (Germany) Nele Wenzel
- 24 (Germany) Meike Schmelzer

Back players
LB

- 8 (Germany) Lena Degenhardt
- 10 (Germany) Matilda Ehlert
- 27 (Netherlands) Nyala Baijens
- 29 (Germany) Lucie-Marie Kretzschmar

CB

- 2 (Germany) Mareike Thomaier
- 17 (Germany) Lisa Friedberger
- 25 (Germany) Kim Irion
- 32 (Germany) Neele Mara Orth

RB

- 6 (Germany) Nina Engel

==== Transfers ====
Transfers for the 2026–27 season

Joining

- (France) Melanie Halter (GK) (from (Hungary) Mosonmagyaróvári KC SE)
- (Germany) Chiara Rohr (LW) (from (Germany) TV Hannover-Badenstedt)
- (Denmark) Ida Hoberg (LB) (from (Denmark) EH Aalborg)
- (Sweden) Emma Andersson (GK) (from (Sweden) Skövde HF)
- (Germany) Saskia Probst (RW) (from (Germany) HSG Freiburg)
- (Germany) Cara Reuthal (RB) (from (Germany) SV Union Halle-Neustadt)

Leaving

- (Germany) Amelie Berger (RW) (to (Croatia) RK Podravka Koprivnica)
- (Germany) Nina Engel (RB) (to (Romania) CS Gloria Bistrița)
- (Germany) Mareike Thomaier (CB) (to (Germany) Borussia Dortmund)
- (Germany) Vanessa Fehr (GK) (to (Romania) SCM Craiova)
- (Germany) Mia Ziercke (LW) (still unknown)
- (Germany) Matilda Ehlert (LB) (to (Germany) Frisch Auf Göppingen)
- (Germany) Nele Wenzel (PV) (to (Germany) SV Union Halle-Neustadt)
- (Netherlands) Helen van Beurden (GK) (retires)
- (Germany) Lisa Friedberger (CB) (retires)
