= SV Union Halle-Neustadt =

German women's handball team

- Full name: SV Union Halle-Neustadt e.V.
- Short name: SV Union
- Founded: 1970
- Arena: ERDGAS Sportarena, Halle
- Capacity: 1,200
- President: Bodo Meerheim
- Head coach: Jan-Henning Himborn
- League: Handball-Bundesliga
- 2025–26: 11th
Home	Away

SV Union Halle-Neustadt e.V. is a German women's handball team from Halle (Saxony-Anhalt). They compete in the Handball-Bundesliga Frauen, the top division in Germany.

== Team ==
=== Current squad ===
Squad for the 2022–23 season.

Goalkeepers

- 12 (Bosnia and Herzegovina) Anica Gudelj
- 16 (Germany) Thara Sieg
- 99 (Germany) Lara-Sophie Lepschi

Wingers
LW

- 98 (Croatia) Marija Gudelj

RW

- 7 (Germany) Franziska Fischer
- 8 (Germany) Judith Tietjen

Line players

- 5 (Serbia) Edita Nukovic
- 13 (Sweden) Madeleine Östlund

Back players
LB

- 6 (Germany) Janne-Lotta Woch
- 10 (Denmark) Simone Spur Pedersen
- 44 (Poland) Julia Niewiadomska

CB

- 15 (Denmark) Cecilie Woller
- 20 (Netherlands) Maxime Struijs
- 29 (Sweden) Alexandra Lundström
- 75 (Germany) Vanessa Dierks

RB

- 24 (Denmark) Helena Mikkelsen
- 26 (Germany) Cara Reuthal

=== Transfers ===
Transfers for the 2026–27 season

Joining

- (Netherlands) Lynn Holtman (CB), (from (Germany) Sport-Union Neckarsulm)
- (Germany) Nele Wenzel (PV) (from (Germany) HSG Bensheim/Auerbach)
- (Poland) Paulina Stapurewicz (CB) (from (Poland) KPR Kobierzyce)
- (Netherlands) Loïs van Vliet (LW) (to (Denmark) Ikast Håndbold)

Leaving

- (Germany) Lilli Röpcke (LW) (to (Germany) HSG Blomberg-Lippe)
- (Germany) Lucy Strauchmann (PV) (to (Germany) Buxtehuder SV)
- (Germany) Cara Reuthal (RB) (to (Germany) HSG Bensheim/Auerbach)
