= BSV Sachsen Zwickau =

German handball club

- Full name: Ballsportverein Sachsen Zwickau e. V.
- Short name: BSV Sachsen Zwickau
- Founded: August 8, 1990; 36 years ago
- Arena: Sparkassen-Arena Zwickau, Zwickau
- Capacity: 3,043
- President: Sylvia Wössner
- Head coach: Norman Rentsch
- League: Bundesliga
- 2025–26: 10th
- Club colours
Home	Away

Location of BSV Sachsen Zwickau

Ballsportverein Sachsen Zwickau e. V. is a German women's handball team from Zwickau, Saxony. It plays in the Bundesliga.

== History ==
The club was founded as a continuation of the DDR club BSG Aktivist Karl Marx Zwickau after the fall of the Berlin Wall. The progenitor club goes back to 1949. In the DDR-Oberliga the team was a regular missing only 2 seasons in the top division. The newly refounded club started in 1990-91 in the Bundesliga, but were relegated in their first season, after finishing 9th out of 12. In 1995 they were promoted to the Bundesliga by winning the 2nd Bundesliga.

The team was promoted to the Bundesliga once again in 2021 by winning another 2nd Bundesliga title. In their first season they survived by finishing 13th out of 14th and thus qualifying for the relegation play-off, which they won against Frisch Auf Göppingen. In the 2023–24 season they achieved their best result ever, when they finished 11th.

== Current squad ==
Squad for the 2026–27 season

Goalkeepers

- 20 (Germany) Katja Grewe
- 26 (Germany) Lilly-Charlott Meinel
- 32 (Germany) Alexandra Humpert
- 33 (Austria) Denise Kaufmann
- 34 (Germany) Paulina Curth

Wingers
LW

- 9 (Iceland) Lilja Ágústsdóttir

RW

- 10 (Hungary) Lili Balogh
- 21 (Germany) Neele Reuter
- 71 (Poland) Amelia Worozanska
- 99 (Netherlands) Romé Steverink

Line players

- 11 (Portugal) Rita Campos
- 31 (Germany) Victoria Hasselbusch
- 73 (Germany) Zoe Stens

Back players
LB

- 44 (Poland) Julia Niewiadomska
- 76 (Montenegro) Nina Ramusović

CB

- 15 (Poland) Jagoda Tobolewska
- 23 (Germany) Silje Brøns Petersen

RB

- 13 (Austria) Kristina Dramac
- 27 (Denmark) Liv Navne

== Transfers ==
Transfers for the 2026–27 season:

Joining

- (Germany) Alexandra Humpert (GK) (from (Germany) VfL Oldenburg)
- (Germany) Katja Grewe (GK) (from (Germany) HSV Solingen-Gräfrath)
- (Iceland) Lilja Ágústsdóttir (LW) (from (Iceland) Valur Reykjavík)
- (Austria) Kristina Dramac (RB) (from (Croatia) RK Podravka Koprivnica)
- (Portugal) Rita Campos (PV) (from (Spain) CBF Málaga Costa del Sol)
- (Poland) Amelia Worozanska (RW) (from (Poland) Korona Handball Kielce)
- (Poland) Jagoda Tobolewska (CB) (from (Poland) SPR Pogoń 1945 Zabrze)
- (Denmark) Liv Navne (RB) (from (Denmark) HØJ Elite)
- (Montenegro) Nina Ramusović (LB) (from (Montenegro) ŽRK Budućnost Podgorica)
- (Hungary) Lili Balogh (RW) (from (Hungary) Győri ETO KC)
- (Austria) Denise Kaufmann (GK) (from (Switzerland) LC Brühl Handball)

Leaving

- (Hungary) Barbara Győri (GK) (to (Germany) Neckarsulmer SU)
- (Germany) Lilly Janßen (GK) (to loan return (Germany) VfL Oldenburg)
- (Hungary) Laura Pénzes (CB) (to (Germany) Füchse Berlin)
- (Germany) Lea–Sophie Walkowiak (LW) (to (Germany) SG 09 Kirchhof)
- (Germany) Thara Sieg (GK) (to (Germany) Füchse Berlin)
- (Hungary) Laura Szabó (LP) (to (Hungary) MTK Budapest)
- (Switzerland) Charlotte Kähr (LP) (to (Germany) TuS Metzingen)
- (Japan) Kaho Nakayama (RB) (to (Romania) CSM Slatina)
- (Germany) Jasmina Gierga (CB) (to (Germany) Bergischer HC)

== Staff ==
Pos.	Name
Head Coach	(Germany) Norman Rentsch
Assistant Coach	(Hungary) Rita Lakatos
Assistant Coach	(Germany) Dietmar Schmidt
Goalkeeper Trainer	(Germany) Thomas Müller
Physiotherapist	(Germany) Eric Kugler
Team Leader	(Germany) Lars Radecker

== Coaching history ==
- Rolf Steudemann (1982 to August 1992)
- Csaba Arva (August 1992 to April 1996)
- Bernd Groh (April 1996 to November 1996)
- Rolf Steudemann (November 1996 to March 1999)
- Andreas Bolomsky (March 1999 to May 1999)
- Antanas Taraskevicius (July 1999 to May 2001)
- Steffen Lederer (July 2001 to October 2004)
- Isabella Glaser (October 2004 to November 2005)
- Harry Olzmann (November 2005 to January 2006)
- Csaba Arva (January 2006 to November 2007)
- Steffen Wohlrab (November 2007 to December 2011)
- Norman Rentsch (December 2011 to June 2014)
- Jiri Tancoš (July 2014 to January 2015)
- Daniela Filip (January 2015 to June 2015)
- Karsten Knöfler (July 2015 to February 2016)
- Andy Palm (March 2016 to February 2017)
- Corina Cupcea (Interim / March 2017 to May 2017)
- Marko Brezić (July 2017 to 17. November 2017)
- Corina Cupcea (Interim / 17. November 2017 to 30. June 2018)
- Rüdiger Bones (1. July 2018 to 19. December 2018)
- Norman Rentsch (From 8. January 2019)
