= TSV Bayer 04 Leverkusen (handball) =

German handball club

- Full name: HC TSV Bayer 04 Leverkusen
- Nickname: Werkselfen
- Short name: Bayer Leverkusen
- Founded: 1904
- Arena: Ostermann-Arena, Leverkusen
- Capacity: 3,500
- President: Klaus Beck
- Head coach: Michael Biegler
- League: Bundesliga
- 2024–25: 12th (relegated)
- Club colours
Home	Away

HC TSV Bayer 04 Leverkusen is a Germany professional women's handball club from Leverkusen representing Bayer 04 Leverkusen in the Handball-Bundesliga Frauen.

Bayer Leverkusen won six national championships between 1965 and 1980, and six more titles in a row between 1982 and 1987, its most successful period. It was the only team from West Germany to reach the European Cup's final before the country's reunification, in 1984, and seven years later it also played the EHF Women's Cup's final. In 2005 it finally won its first international title, a Challenge Cup. In recent years it has won the 2010 German Cup and reached the EHF Cup and Cup Winners' Cup's semifinals. The club has the record for most DHB-Pokals won with 9 titles, the latest being in 2010.

== Kits ==
HOME
2017-18	2018–19

AWAY
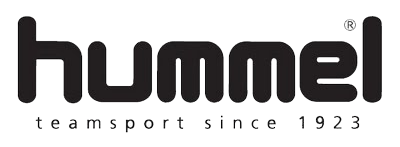
2018–19

== Titles ==
- Challenge Cup
  - 2005
- German League
  - 1965, 1966, 1973, 1974, 1979, 1980, 1982, 1983, 1984, 1985, 1986, 1987
- German Cup
  - 1980, 1982, 1983, 1984, 1985, 1987, 1991, 2002, 2010

== Team ==
=== Current squad ===
Squad for the 2024–25 season

Goalkeepers

- 11 (Netherlands) Lieke van der Linden
- 16 (Germany) Nele Vogel
- 71 (Germany) Lena Lindemann

Wingers
LW

- 26 (Germany) Loreen Veit
- 24 (Germany) Nele Spengler

RW

- 5 (Germany) Luise Gruber
- 20 (Germany) Pia Terfloth
- 28 (Germany) Christine Kaufmann
- 77 (Germany) Hannah Marie Wirth

Line players

- 8 (Netherlands) Fem Boeters
- 2 (Germany) Annika Ingenpaß
- 37 (Germany) Marie Teusch

Back players
LB

- 18 (Germany) Johanna Andresen
- 39 (Portugal) Jennifer Souza
- 30 (Netherlands) Rozemarijn Irma Genevieve Alderden

CB

- 10 (Germany) Sophia Cormann
- 21 (Germany) Mia Cruzado

RB

=== Transfers ===
Transfers for the 2024-25 season

Joining

- (Netherlands) Rozemarijn Irma Genevieve Alderden (LB) (from (Netherlands) VOC Amsterdam)

Leaving

- (Germany) Mareike Thomaier (CB) (to (Germany) HB Ludwigsburg)
- (Germany) Viola Leuchter (RB) (to (Germany) HB Ludwigsburg)
- (Portugal) Mariana Ferreira Lopes (LB) (to (Hungary) Békéscsabai Előre NKSE)
- (Sweden) Miranda Nasser (GK) (to (Sweden) Kristianstad HK)
- (Germany) Marla Sophie Mathwig (CB) (to (Germany) HL Buchholz 08-Rosengarten)

=== Notable former players ===
- (Denmark) Kristine Andersen (1996-1997)
- (Azerbaijan) Valentyna Salamakha (2011-2015)
- (Austria) Katrin Engel (2009-2010)
- (Austria) Kristina Logvin (2013-2015)
- (Netherlands) Debbie Klijn (1999-2004)
- (Slovenia) Branka Zec (2016-2018)
- (Australia) Sally Potocki (2016-2019)
- (Germany) Sabine Englert (2003-2007)
- (Germany) Nadine Krause (2001–2007, 2011-2012)
- (Germany) Anna Loerper (2003-2011)
- (Germany) Jenny Karolius (2014-2019)
- (Germany) Jennifer Rode (2014-2020)
- (Germany) Anne Müller (1999-2010)
- (Germany) Sabrina Richter (2004–2008)
- (Germany) Laura Steinbach (2007-2013)
- (Germany) Clara Woltering (2000-2011)
- (Germany) Katja Kramarczyk (2016-2018)
- (Germany) Kim Naidzinavicius (2011-2016)
- (Germany) Marlene Zapf (2009-2014)
- (Germany) Amelie Berger (2016-2019)
- (Germany) Aimée von Pereira (2018-2019)
- (Germany) Kim Braun (2014-2018)
