= Handball-Bundesliga (women) =

Women's handball league in Germany

Bundesliga
- Current season, competition or edition: 2025–26 Handball-Bundesliga (women)
- Sport: Handball
- Founded: 1975; 51 years ago
- Administrator: Deutscher Handballbund (DHB)
- No. of teams: 14
- Country: Germany
- Confederation: EHF
- Most recent champion: HSG Blomberg-Lippe (2025–26)
- Most titles: Bayer 04 Leverkusen (8 titles)
- Level on pyramid: Level 1
- Relegation to: 2. Handball-Bundesliga
- Domestic cup: DHB-Pokal
- International cups: Champions League; EHF European League
- Website: handball-bundesliga-frauen.de

Handball-Bundesliga is the top women's professional handball league in Germany.

== History ==
The title of women's champion in indoor handball has been competed for since 1957–58. The first champions were Eimsbüteller TV. The modern Bundesliga was founded in 1975. In the first 10 seasons, the table was divided in two subdivisions, north and south (Nord and Süd), who then met in a playoff.

Since 1985 the modern format with one national table has been in effect.

=== Records ===
- Biggest home win
  - 22 May 1991 - TV Lützellinden - TuS Walle Bremen - +45 (50-5)
- Biggest away win
  - 28 September 2023 - HSG Bad Wildungen - SG BBM Bietigheim - +32 (17-49)
- Highest scoring draw
  - 14 May 2023 - VfL Oldenburg - SG BBM Bietigheim - 76 goals (38-38)
- Lowest scoring draw
  - 19 October 1975 - PSV Grünweiß Frankfurt - TSV Rot-Weiß Auerbach - 8 goals (4-4)
- Highest scoring game
  - 25 February 2024 - VfL Oldenburg - HSG Bad Wildungen - 82 goals (48-34)

== 2025–26 season teams ==
- Thüringer HC
- TuS Metzingen
- Borussia Dortmund Handball
- Buxtehuder SV
- VfL Oldenburg
- HSG Blomberg-Lippe
- Neckarsulmer SU
- HSG Bensheim-Auerbach
- BSV Sachsen Zwickau
- Frisch Auf Göppingen
- SV Union Halle-Neustadt
Location of the Handball-Bundesliga Frauen 2025–26 teams

=== EHF league ranking ===
EHF League Ranking for 2022/23 season:

- 7. (7) (Montenegro) Prva Liga (61.33)
- 8. (9) (Croatia) 1. HRL (57.00)
- 9. (8) (Germany) Handball-Bundesliga Frauen (56.33)
- 10. (11) (Slovenia) 1. A DRL
- 11. (10) (Sweden) SHE Women (37.40)
- 12. (13) (Poland) PGNiG Superliga (33.00)

== Champions by years ==
| Year | Team |
|---|---|
| 1975–76 | TuS Eintracht Minden |
| 1976–77 | TSV GutsMuths Berlin |
| 1977–78 | TuS Eintracht Minden |
| 1978–79 | Bayer 04 Leverkusen |
| 1979–80 | Bayer 04 Leverkusen |
| 1980–81 | PSV Grünweiß Frankfurt |
| 1981–82 | Bayer 04 Leverkusen |
| 1982–83 | Bayer 04 Leverkusen |
| 1983–84 | Bayer 04 Leverkusen |
| 1984–85 | Bayer 04 Leverkusen |
| 1985–86 | Bayer 04 Leverkusen |
| 1986–87 | Bayer 04 Leverkusen |
| 1987–88 | TV Lützellinden |
| 1988–89 | TV Lützellinden |
| 1989–90 | TV Lützellinden |

| Year | Team |
|---|---|
| 1990–91 | TuS Walle Bremen |
| 1991–92 | TuS Walle Bremen |
| 1992–93 | TV Lützellinden |
| 1993–94 | TuS Walle Bremen |
| 1994–95 | TuS Walle Bremen |
| 1995–96 | TuS Walle Bremen |
| 1996–97 | TV Lützellinden |
| 1997–98 | VfB Leipzig |
| 1998–99 | VfB Leipzig |
| 1999–00 | TV Lützellinden |
| 2000–01 | TV Lützellinden |
| 2001–02 | HC Leipzig |
| 2002–03 | DJK/MJC Trier |
| 2003–04 | FHC Frankfurt/Oder |
| 2004–05 | 1. FC Nürnberg |

| Year | Team |
|---|---|
| 2005–06 | HC Leipzig |
| 2006–07 | 1. FC Nürnberg |
| 2007–08 | 1. FC Nürnberg |
| 2008–09 | HC Leipzig |
| 2009–10 | HC Leipzig |
| 2010–11 | Thüringer HC |
| 2011–12 | Thüringer HC |
| 2012–13 | Thüringer HC |
| 2013–14 | Thüringer HC |
| 2014–15 | Thüringer HC |
| 2015–16 | Thüringer HC |
| 2016–17 | SG BBM Bietigheim |
| 2017–18 | Thüringer HC |
| 2018–19 | SG BBM Bietigheim |
| 2019–20 | No champion. Cancellation due to COVID-19 |

| Year | Team |
|---|---|
| 2020–21 | Borussia Dortmund Handball |
| 2021–22 | SG BBM Bietigheim |
| 2022–23 | SG BBM Bietigheim |
| 2023–24 | SG BBM Bietigheim |
| 2024–25 | HB Ludwigsburg |
| 2025–26 | HSG Blomberg-Lippe |

== Champions by number of titles ==
| Club | Title | Years |
|---|---|---|
| Bayer Leverkusen | 8 | 1978/79, 1979/80, 1981/82, 1982/83, 1983/84, 1984/85, 1985/86, 1986/87 |
| Thüringer HC | 7 | 2010/11, 2011/12, 2012/13, 2013/14, 2014/15, 2015/16, 2017/18 |
| TV Lützellinden | 7 | 1987/88, 1988/89, 1989/90, 1992/93, 1996/97, 1999/2000, 2000/01 |
| HC Leipzig | 6 | 1997/98, 1998/99, 2001/02, 2005/06, 2008/09, 2009/10 |
| HB Ludwigsburg | 6 | 2016/17, 2018/19, 2021/22, 2022/23, 2023/24, 2024/25 |
| TuS Walle Bremen | 5 | 1990/91, 1991/92, 1993/94, 1994/95, 1995/96 |
| 1. FC Nürnberg | 3 | 2004/05, 2006/07, 2007/08 |
| TuS Eintracht Minden | 2 | 1975/76, 1977/78 |
| FHC Frankfurt/Oder | 1 | 2003/04 |
| DJK/MJC Trier | 1 | 2002/03 |
| PSV Grün-Weiß Frankfurt | 1 | 1980/81 |
| TSV GutsMuths Berlin | 1 | 1976/77 |
| Borussia Dortmund Handball | 1 | 2020/21 |
| HSG Blomberg-Lippe | 1 | 2025/26 |
