= Neckarsulmer SU (women's handball) =

German handball club

Sport-Union Neckarsulm
- Full name: Sport-Union Neckarsulm e.V.
- Short name: SUN, Sport-Union
- Founded: 1 January 2009; 17 years ago (as Neckarsulmer Sport-Union)
- Arena: Ballei-Sporthalle
- Capacity: 1,500
- President: Rolf Härdtner
- Head coach: Thomas Zeitz
- League: Handball Bundesliga Frauen
- 2025–26: 9th
- Club colours
Home	Away

Neckarsulmer SU (women's handball) (Germany)

Sport-Union Neckarsulm is the women's handball team of the sports club Sport-Union Neckarsulm, from the town of Neckarsulm in the southwest of Germany. The team competes domestically in the Handball-Bundesliga and the DHB-Pokal. They play their home matches at the Ballei-Sporthalle and usually wear dark navy shirts and shorts.

== History ==
=== Early years ===
Sport-Union Neckarsulm was founded on New Year's Day in 2009 as Neckarsulmer Sport-Union (NSU) through the merger of Sportvereinigung Neckarsulm 1946 and Sportfreunde Neckarsulm. The name alludes to the NSU Motorenwerke, the predecessor of Audi, which was located in the city of Neckarsulm until 1985. The multi sports club consists of 17 different sections of which the women's handball section is one of the best known because of their multi-year participation in the Bundesliga, Germany's most important handball league.

=== Climbing up the league pyramid ===
After two championship titles in regional fifth and fourth tier leagues, coach Emir Hadzimuhamedović led the team also to promotion to the 2. Bundesliga in the summer of 2013. In the following years, the team established itself there and gained promotion to the Bundesliga as second division champions in 2016. A big part in the various promotions from regional amateur levels to professional tiers played the successful under-17 team, which won the German championship in 2011. Talented players of this youth team formed an integral part of the first team in later years.

In addition to its sporting successes in league competitions, Sport-Union also won the HVW-Pokal, the regional cup competition in the region of Württemberg, twice in its first four years of existence. In 2011, the team defeated TV Großbottwar, which was then playing two leagues higher than themselves, 34:24 in the final at the SCHARRena Stuttgart. Two years later they crowned themselves cup champion of 2013 at the same venue after a commanding win against third division rivals TG Nürtingen (33:24).

=== New name and establishment in the Bundesliga ===
After promotion to the Bundesliga Neckarsulmer Sport-Union was fighting against relegation for their first three years in Germany's top tier but eventually managed to stay in the league. With coaches Pascal Morgant and Tanja Logvin at the helm, the team established itself in the following years as a solid force in the Bundesliga with a sixth-place finish in the 2020–21 season, the best result to date.

In 2021 Neckarsulmer Sport-Union was forced to change its name and crest due to unwanted associations with the right-wing extremist organization National Socialist Underground, although the abbreviation NSU has a long regional tradition in and around the city of Neckarsulm. Now playing as Sport-Union Neckarsulm the club produced players like Selina Kalmbach or Sarah Wachter who went on to become internationals for Germany.

On August 12, 2025, Sport-Union Neckarsulm announced that Germany's national team captain Antje Döll would be joining the club on a free transfer from HB Ludwigsburg with immediate effect, after the then-acting champions of Germany filed for bankruptcy, making her the club's most prominent signing to date. Playing for Sport-Union Neckarsulm domestically, Döll went on to captain Germany to the final at the 2025 World Women's Handball Championship, scoring 49 goals during the course of the tournament and was also chosen to be part of the tournament's All-star Team.

== Season to season ==
Season	Tier	League	Position	Games	Goals	Diff.	Points	DHB-Pokal
2009–10	V	Württembergliga (Nord)	9th/12	22	559:602	-43	19:25	−
2010–11	V	Württembergliga (Nord)	1st/12	22	802:507	+295	44:0	−
2010–11	V	Württembergliga playoffs	1st/4	6	223:140	+83	12:0	−
2011–12	IV	BW-Oberliga	1st/14	26	967:700	+267	50:2	Round of 32
2012–13	III	3. Liga (Süd)	1st/14	26	881:665	+216	48:4	−
2013–14	II	2. Bundesliga	7th/14	28	799:796	+3	27:29	Round of 16
2014–15	II	2. Bundesliga	4th/14	26	761:686	+75	34:18	First round
2015–16	II	2. Bundesliga	1st/16	30	937:726	+211	53:7	Quarterfinals
2016–17	I	Bundesliga	12th/14	26	624:725	-101	13:39	Round of 16
2017–18	I	Bundesliga	13th/14	26	619:795	-176	10:42	Round of 32
2018–19	I	Bundesliga	12th/14	26	652:763	-111	13:39	Quarterfinals
2019–20	I	Bundesliga	9th/14	18	458:527	-69	12:24	Quarterfinals
2020–21	I	Bundesliga	6th/16	30	872:845	+27	37:23	Round of 16
2021–22	I	Bundesliga	7th/14	26	797:813	-16	26:26	Round of 16
2022–23	I	Bundesliga	12th/14	26	681:786	-105	15:37	Round of 16
2023–24	I	Bundesliga	10th/14	26	703:772	-69	14:38	Round of 16
2024–25	I	Bundesliga	9th/12	22	603:641	-38	16:28	Round of 16
2024–25	I	Bundesliga playdowns	semifinals	2	68:43	+25	4:0	Round of 16
2025–26	I	Bundesliga	6th/12	20	577:588	-11	17:23	Quarterfinals
2025–26	I	Bundesliga playoffs 5–11	5th/7	6	171:196	-25	9:9	Quarterfinals
2026–27	I	Bundesliga						Second round

== Arena ==
Ballei-Sporthalle
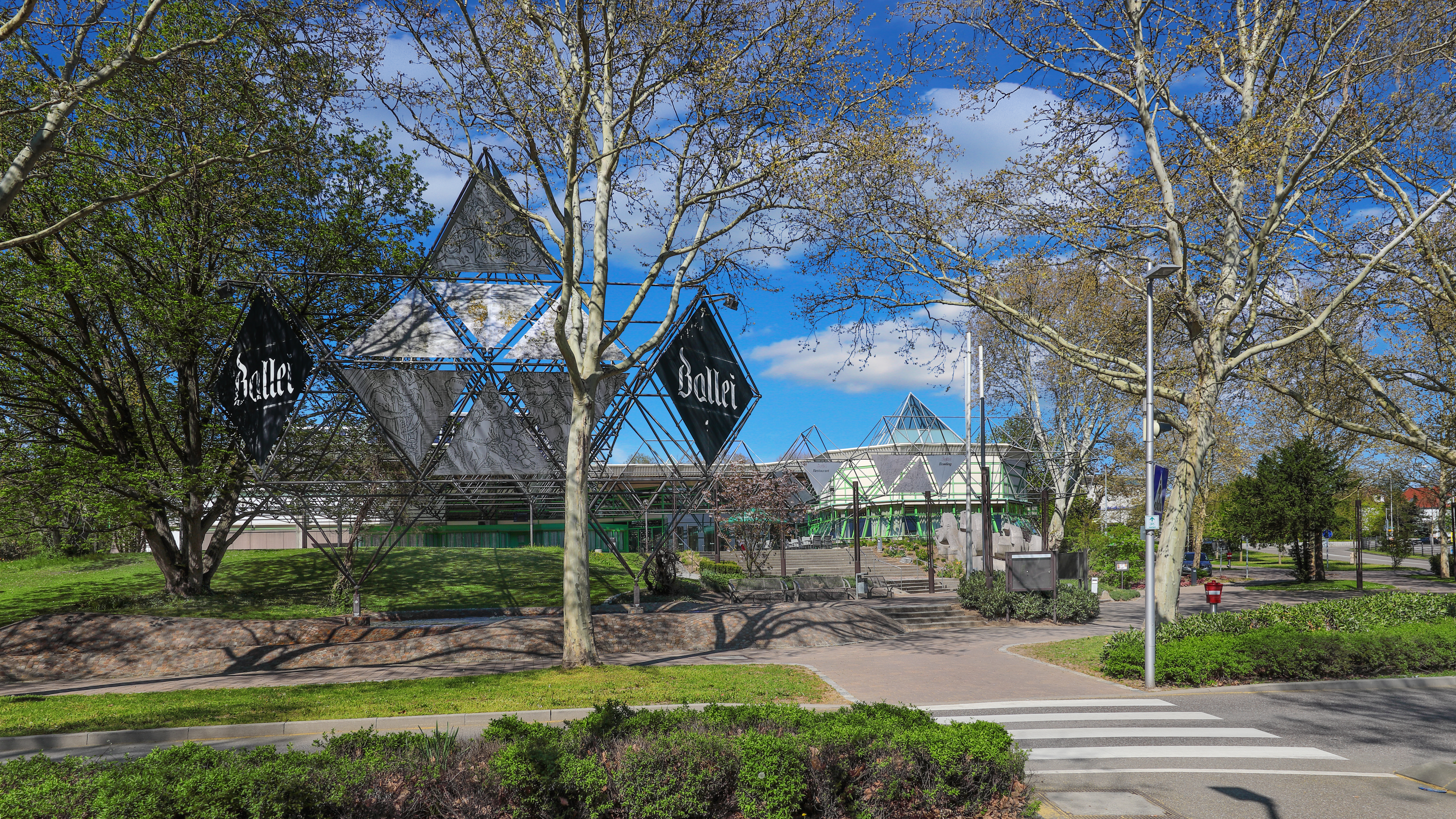
- Capacity: 1,500
- Field size: 50 m × 31.75 m (164.0 ft × 104.2 ft)

Construction
- Groundbreaking: 19 June 1978
- Opened: 6 October 1979
- Architect: Karl-Ulrich Bechler

Sport-Union Neckarsulm play their home matches at the Ballei-Sporthalle, a multi-purpose arena which hosts up to 1,500 spectators (1,125 seated and 375 standing). The arena complex also includes a hall for cultural events for up to 1,000 people as well as a restaurant and a bowling alley. The men's handball team of the club plays selected matches at the Ballei as well. The arena is among the most visited in the Bundesliga and hosted, among others, a friendly match of the Soviet Union men's national handball team in 1989 as well as an international fixture between the women's teams of Germany and Romania in March 2009 (37:24).

- Name: Ballei-Sporthalle
- Location: Neckarsulm, Germany
- Capacity: 1,500 spectators
- Address: Deutschordensplatz 1, 74172 Neckarsulm

The club's most prominent supporters' group is Blaue Wand ("Blue wall"), which is located in sector K of Ballei's Audi-Tribüne since the 2025–26 season. Until then the group was situated in sector B. Blaue Wand arranges away day travels as well as meet-and-greets with players and staff and is also heavily involved in the organisation of home matches.

Bundesliga attendances at Ballei-Sporthalle^{[A]}
Season	Overall	Average	Rank	Notes
2016–17	14,305	1,100	4th/14	
2017–18	13,541	1,041	7th/14	
2018–19	13,550	1,042	6th/14	
2019–20	7,511	938	9th/14	
2020–21	1,217	304	5th/16	
2021–22	9,378	721	1st/14	
2022–23	11,878	914	5th/14	
2023–24	12,865	990	5th/14	
2024–25	12,075	1,006	8th/12	
2025–26	14,003	1,077	9th/12	
2026–27				

A. Including playoff/playdown matches.

== Team ==
=== Current squad ===
Squad for the 2026–27 season.

No.	Position	Player	Nationality	Date of birth (age)	Height	Year signed	Signed from	End of contract
Goalkeepers
30	GK	Annie Linder	(Sweden)	10 March 1999 (age 27)	1,79m	2026	(Germany) Buxtehuder SV	2028
54	GK	Barbara Győri	(Hungary)	15 March 1997 (age 29)	1,80m	2026	(Germany) BSV Sachsen Zwickau	2029
Wingers
21	LW	Alessia Riner	(Switzerland)	8 January 2004 (age 22)	1,70m	2023	(Switzerland) LK Zug	2028
22	RW	Meret Ossenkopp	(Germany)	21 June 1998 (age 28)	1,75m	2025	(Germany) HL Buchholz 08-Rosengarten	2027
42	RW	Amber Verbraeken	(Netherlands)	5 July 2002 (age 24)	1,80m	2026	(Germany) HSG Blomberg-Lippe	2028
59	LW	Antje Döll	(Germany)	3 October 1988 (age 38)	1,70m	2025	(Germany) HB Ludwigsburg	2028
Line players
5	P	Kim Hinkelmann	(Germany)	16 October 2001 (age 24)	1,83m	2023	(Denmark) Holstebro Håndbold	2027
39	P	Merle Albers	(Germany)	19 April 2004 (age 22)	1,83m	2025	(France) Palente Besançon Handball	2028
Backcourt players
9	LB	Fanny Elovson	(Sweden)	29 April 2000 (age 26)	1,81m	2026	(Norway) Molde Elite	2028
10	RB	Lisa Vlug	(Netherlands)	10 February 2002 (age 24)	1,79m	2026	(France) Strasbourg ATH	2028
11	CB	Annefleur Bruggeman	(Netherlands)	23 July 1997 (age 29)	1,81m	2022	(Germany) Bayer 04 Leverkusen	2028
13	LB	Alicia Soffel	(Germany)	11 February 1999 (age 27)	1,76m	2025	(Germany) HSG Bensheim/Auerbach	2027
14	LB	Kamila Březinová	(Czech Republic)	4 December 1997 (age 28)	1,79m	2025	(France) Handball Plan-de-Cuques	2027
23	LB	Munia Smits	Belgian-German	23 December 1999 (age 26)	1,78m	2022	(Germany) HSG Bad Wildungen	2028
26	RB	Karolain Lewandowski	(Brazil)	23 March 2001 (age 25)	1,77m	2026	(France) Le Havre AC	2028
27	LB	Sina Ehmann	(Germany)	3 November 2000 (age 25)	1,78m	2026	(Germany) Frisch Auf Göppingen	2029
78	LB	Paulina Uścinowicz	(Poland)	16 October 1999 (age 26)	1,83m	2025	(Germany) HSV Solingen-Gräfrath	2027

=== Transfers ===
Transfers for the 2026–27 season.

Joining

- (Germany) Sina Ehmann (LB), from (Germany) Frisch Auf Göppingen
- (Sweden) Fanny Elovson (LB), from (Norway) Molde Elite
- (Hungary) Barbara Győri (GK), from (Germany) BSV Sachsen Zwickau
- (Brazil) Karolain Lewandowski (RB), from (France) Le Havre AC
- (Sweden) Annie Linder (GK), from (Germany) Buxtehuder SV
- (Netherlands) Amber Verbraeken (RW), from (Germany) HSG Blomberg-Lippe
- (Netherlands) Lisa Vlug (RB), from (France) ATH Strasbourg

Leaving

- (Norway) Johanna Fossum (GK), to (Norway) Sola HK
- (Norway) Angunn Gudmestad (LB), to (Norway) Sola HK
- (Germany) Lilli Holste (RB), to (Germany) HC Rödertal
- (Netherlands) Lynn Holtman (CB), to (Germany) SV Union Halle-Neustadt
- (Austria) Lena Ivančok (GK), to (France) Jeanne d'Arc Dijon Handball
- (Netherlands) Iva van der Linden (RW), retired

=== Technical staff ===
Technical staff for the 2026–27 season.

- (Germany) Head coach: Thomas Zeitz
- (Germany) Assistant coach: Gernot Drossel
- (Germany) Goalkeeping coach: Oliver Rieth
- (Germany) Sporting director: Thomas Zeitz
- (Germany) Team coach: Mike Vogelgesang
- (Germany) Team coach: Jutta Perger
- (Spain) Physiotherapist: Sergi García
- (Bulgaria) Physiotherapist: Nikolay Popovski
- (Germany) Team doctor: Dr. Boris Brand
- (Germany) Team doctor: Dr. Urs Riemann
- (Germany) Neuro performance coach: Patrick Keicher

== Personnel ==
=== Notable former players ===
- (Germany) Maike Daniels
- (Germany) Nina Engel
- (Germany) Ann-Cathrin Giegerich
- (Germany) Selina Kalmbach
- (Germany) Lucie-Marie Kretzschmar
- (Germany) Nele Reimer
- (Germany) Nicole Roth
- (Germany) Luisa Schulze
- (Germany) Johanna Stockschläder
- (Germany) Sarah Wachter
- (Austria) Melanie Herrmann
- (Austria) Lena Ivančok
- (Austria) Stefanie Kaiser
- (Switzerland) Daphne Gautschi
- (Switzerland) Seline Ineichen
- (Switzerland) Celia Schneider
- (Switzerland) Chantal Wick
- (Czech Republic) Veronika Andrýsková
- (Czech Republic) Alena Vojtíšková
- (Denmark) Mette Gravholt
- (Denmark) Mia Møldrup
- (Spain) Irene Espínola Pérez
- (Iceland) Birna Berg Haraldsdóttir
- (Montenegro) Mirjana Milenković
- (Netherlands) Michelle Goos
- (Netherlands) Nathalie Hendrikse
- (Netherlands) Lynn Knippenborg
- (Netherlands) Anouk Nieuwenweg
- (Netherlands) Sharon Nooitmeer
- (Poland) Emilia Galińska
- (Portugal) Isabel de Góis
- (Russia) Valeria Gorelova
- (Slovenia) Nives Ahlin

=== Squad history ===
2009–10 squad

2009–10 Württembergliga (Nord) (9th/12)
No.	Position	Player	Nationality	Date of birth	Year signed	Signed from
2	P	Ulrike Arnold	(Germany)	1979	2003	(Germany) SV Leingarten
4	LW	Madeleine Haug	(Germany)	15 June 1990	2009	(Germany) SG BBM Bietigheim
6	LB	Sara Kauth	(Germany)		2009	(Germany) TSV Bönnigheim
7	CB	Katrin Nachbar	(Germany)		2008	(Germany) VfL Waiblingen
8	LW	Nadine Diemer	(Germany)		2005	(Germany) TV Mosbach
10	RW	Jasmin Fimiani	(Germany)		2009	(Germany) TSG Schwäbisch Hall
10	LB	Lena Schäfer	(Germany)	24 January 1992	2009	(Germany) Sport-Union Neckarsulm U19
10	RB	Dorothea Rebber	(Germany)	10 September 1980	2010	(Germany) SG H2Ku Herrenberg
13	RW	Ninette Gruhl	(Germany)		2005	(Germany) TV Mosbach
19	RW	Julia Perger	(Germany)	19 October 1987	2007	(Germany) Sport-Union Neckarsulm II
20	CB	Sandra Benkner	(Germany)	20 May 1990	2009	(Germany) SG Böckingen-Leingarten
21	P	Larissa Vogt	(Germany)	1 March 1992	2009	(Germany) Sport-Union Neckarsulm U19
33	GK	Anja Balbach	(Germany)	31 July 1989	2009	(Germany) SG Böckingen-Leingarten
??	GK	Franziska Pfeffer	(Germany)	28 November 1992	2009	(Germany) Sport-Union Neckarsulm U19

2010–11 squad

2010–11 Württembergliga (Nord) (1st/12)
No.	Position	Player	Nationality	Date of birth	Year signed	Signed from
1	GK	Anja Balbach	(Germany)	31 July 1989	2009	(Germany) SG Böckingen-Leingarten
2	LB	Nicola Freudemann	(Germany)	25 August 1988	2010	(Germany) SG Kickers/Sindelfingen
4	LW	Madeleine Haug	(Germany)	15 June 1990	2009	(Germany) SG BBM Bietigheim
4	LW	Helena Odenwald	(Germany)	17 March 1995	2011	(Germany) Sport-Union Neckarsulm U17
6	LW	Clarissa Walter	(Germany)	25 July 1992	2010	(Germany) Sport-Union Neckarsulm U19
7	RB	Femke Mädger	(Netherlands)	3 May 1980	2010	(Germany) Frisch Auf Göppingen
8	CB	Svenja Kaufmann	(Germany)	23 January 1994	2010	(Germany) Sport-Union Neckarsulm U17
9	RB	Isabel Tissekker	(Germany)	5 February 1994	2010	(Germany) Sport-Union Neckarsulm U17
10	LB	Lena Schäfer	(Germany)	24 January 1992	2009	(Germany) Sport-Union Neckarsulm U19
10	P	Tanja Brunn	(Germany)	10 March 1994	2010	(Germany) Sport-Union Neckarsulm U17
11	LB	Martina Fritz	(Germany)	6 July 1980	2010	(Germany) Frisch Auf Göppingen
18	CB	Melanie Knipfer	(Germany)	4 March 1992	2010	(Germany) Sport-Union Neckarsulm U19
18	RW	Maria Odenwald	(Germany)	17 March 1995	2011	(Germany) Sport-Union Neckarsulm U17
19	RW	Julia Perger	(Germany)	19 October 1987	2007	(Germany) Sport-Union Neckarsulm II
20	CB	Sandra Benkner	(Germany)	20 May 1990	2009	(Germany) SG Böckingen-Leingarten
21	P	Larissa Vogt	(Germany)	1 March 1992	2009	(Germany) Sport-Union Neckarsulm U19
22	LW	Jessica Baumgart	(Germany)	17 July 1991	2010	(Germany) Sport-Union Neckarsulm U19
33	GK	Susanne Anker	(Germany)	12 September 1972	2010	Unattached
??	LW	Karin Zultner	(Germany)	26 May 1988	2010	(Germany) Sport-Union Neckarsulm II
??	GK	Franziska Pfeffer	(Germany)	28 November 1992	2009	(Germany) Sport-Union Neckarsulm U19
??	GK	Hannah Bergmann	(Germany)	1991	2009	Unknown

2011–12 squad

2011–12 Baden-Württemberg Oberliga (1st/14)
No.	Position	Player	Nationality	Date of birth	Year signed	Signed from
2	LB	Nicola Freudemann	(Germany)	25 August 1988	2010	(Germany) SG Kickers/Sindelfingen
4	LW	Julia Ost	(Germany)	8 March 1995	2011	(Germany) Sport-Union Neckarsulm U17
5	LW	Hannah Breitinger	(Germany)	20 August 1987	2011	(Spain) BM Murcia
6	LW	Clarissa Walter	(Germany)	25 July 1992	2010	(Germany) Sport-Union Neckarsulm U19
7	P	Kathrin Fischer	(Germany)	25 April 1989	2011	(Germany) VfL Sindelfingen
8	CB	Svenja Kaufmann	(Germany)	23 January 1994	2010	(Germany) Sport-Union Neckarsulm U17
9	RB	Isabel Tissekker	(Germany)	5 February 1994	2010	(Germany) Sport-Union Neckarsulm U17
10	P	Tanja Brunn	(Germany)	10 March 1994	2010	(Germany) Sport-Union Neckarsulm U17
11	LB	Martina Fritz	(Germany)	6 July 1980	2010	(Germany) Frisch Auf Göppingen
12	GK	Vanessa Steinhoff	(Germany)	14 November 1995	2011	(Germany) Sport-Union Neckarsulm U17
17	RB	Femke Mädger	(Netherlands)	3 May 1980	2010	(Germany) Frisch Auf Göppingen
18	RW	Maria Odenwald	(Germany)	17 March 1995	2011	(Germany) Sport-Union Neckarsulm U17
19	RW	Julia Perger	(Germany)	19 October 1987	2007	(Germany) Sport-Union Neckarsulm II
20	LW	Helena Odenwald	(Germany)	17 March 1995	2011	(Germany) Sport-Union Neckarsulm U17
21	GK	Hanna Kümmerlen	(Germany)	21 August 1993	2011	(Germany) SG Bottwartal
33	GK	Susanne Anker	(Germany)	12 September 1972	2010	Unattached

2012–13 squad

2012–13 3. Liga (Süd) (1st/14)
No.	Position	Player	Nationality	Date of birth	Year signed	Signed from
2	LB	Nicola Freudemann	(Germany)	25 August 1988	2010	(Germany) SG Kickers/Sindelfingen
3	LB	Lena Hoffmann	(Germany)	5 January 1991	2012	(Germany) TV Großbottwar
4	LW	Julia Ost	(Germany)	8 March 1995	2011	(Germany) Sport-Union Neckarsulm U17
5	LW	Hannah Breitinger	(Germany)	20 August 1987	2011	(Spain) BM Murcia
6	RW	Luisa Gerber	(Germany)	12 February 1988	2012	(Germany) TV Pflugfelden
7	P	Kathrin Fischer	(Germany)	25 April 1989	2011	(Germany) VfL Sindelfingen
8	CB	Svenja Kaufmann	(Germany)	23 January 1994	2010	(Germany) Sport-Union Neckarsulm U17
9	RB	Isabel Tissekker	(Germany)	5 February 1994	2010	(Germany) Sport-Union Neckarsulm U17
10	P	Tanja Brunn	(Germany)	10 March 1994	2010	(Germany) Sport-Union Neckarsulm U17
11	LB	Martina Fritz	(Germany)	6 July 1980	2010	(Germany) Frisch Auf Göppingen
12	GK	Vanessa Steinhoff	(Germany)	14 November 1995	2011	(Germany) Sport-Union Neckarsulm U17
18	RW	Maria Odenwald	(Germany)	17 March 1995	2011	(Germany) Sport-Union Neckarsulm U17
19	RW	Julia Perger	(Germany)	19 October 1987	2007	(Germany) Sport-Union Neckarsulm II
20	LW	Helena Odenwald	(Germany)	17 March 1995	2011	(Germany) Sport-Union Neckarsulm U17
21	GK	Hanna Kümmerlen	(Germany)	21 August 1993	2011	(Germany) SG Bottwartal
33	GK	Susanne Anker	(Germany)	12 September 1972	2010	Unattached

2013–14 squad

2013–14 2. Bundesliga (7th/14)
No.	Position	Player	Nationality	Date of birth	Year signed	Signed from
2	LB	Nicola Freudemann	(Germany)	25 August 1988	2010	(Germany) SG Kickers/Sindelfingen
3	LB	Lena Hoffmann	(Germany)	5 January 1991	2012	(Germany) TV Großbottwar
4	LW	Julia Ost	(Germany)	8 March 1995	2011	(Germany) Sport-Union Neckarsulm U17
5	LW	Hannah Breitinger	(Germany)	20 August 1987	2011	(Spain) BM Murcia
6	RW	Luisa Gerber	(Germany)	12 February 1988	2012	(Germany) TV Pflugfelden
7	P	Kathrin Fischer	(Germany)	25 April 1989	2011	(Germany) VfL Sindelfingen
8	CB	Svenja Kaufmann	(Germany)	23 January 1994	2010	(Germany) Sport-Union Neckarsulm U17
9	RB	Isabel Tissekker	(Germany)	5 February 1994	2010	(Germany) Sport-Union Neckarsulm U17
10	P	Tanja Brunn	(Germany)	10 March 1994	2010	(Germany) Sport-Union Neckarsulm U17
11	LB	Martina Fritz	(Germany)	6 July 1980	2010	(Germany) Frisch Auf Göppingen
12	GK	Vanessa Steinhoff	(Germany)	14 November 1995	2011	(Germany) Sport-Union Neckarsulm U17
14	LB	Jasmin Ott	(Germany)	11 November 1992	2013	(Germany) SG Kickers/Sindelfingen
17	RB	Monika Kornet	(Netherlands)	16 February 1992	2013	(Germany) SC Greven 09
18	RW	Maria Odenwald	(Germany)	17 March 1995	2011	(Germany) Sport-Union Neckarsulm U17
20	LW	Helena Odenwald	(Germany)	17 March 1995	2011	(Germany) Sport-Union Neckarsulm U17
21	GK	Hanna Kümmerlen	(Germany)	21 August 1993	2011	(Germany) SG Bottwartal
22	LB	Franziska Ramirez	(Germany)	2 May 1984	2013	(Germany) VfL Waiblingen
23	GK	Celia Schneider	(Switzerland)	28 October 1985	2013	(Germany) TV Nellingen

2014–15 squad

2014–15 2. Bundesliga (4th/14)
No.	Position	Player	Nationality	Date of birth	Year signed	Signed from
2	LW	Selina Kalmbach	(Germany)	24 March 1998	2014	(Germany) SG AbsUbaScho
3	LB	Lena Hoffmann	(Germany)	5 January 1991	2012	(Germany) TV Großbottwar
4	CB	Louisa Wolf	(Germany)	16 July 1994	2014	(Germany) TV Nellingen
5	LW	Hannah Breitinger	(Germany)	20 August 1987	2011	(Spain) BM Murcia
6	RW	Luisa Gerber	(Germany)	12 February 1988	2012	(Germany) TV Pflugfelden
7	P	Kathrin Fischer	(Germany)	25 April 1989	2011	(Germany) VfL Sindelfingen
8	CB	Svenja Kaufmann	(Germany)	23 January 1994	2010	(Germany) Sport-Union Neckarsulm U17
9	RB	Isabel Tissekker	(Germany)	5 February 1994	2010	(Germany) Sport-Union Neckarsulm U17
10	P	Tanja Brunn	(Germany)	10 March 1994	2010	(Germany) Sport-Union Neckarsulm U17
12	GK	Vanessa Steinhoff	(Germany)	14 November 1995	2011	(Germany) Sport-Union Neckarsulm U17
17	RB	Monika Kornet	(Netherlands)	16 February 1992	2013	(Germany) SC Greven 09
18	RW	Maria Odenwald	(Germany)	17 March 1995	2011	(Germany) Sport-Union Neckarsulm U17
20	LW	Helena Odenwald	(Germany)	17 March 1995	2011	(Germany) Sport-Union Neckarsulm U17
22	LB	Franziska Ramirez	(Germany)	2 May 1984	2013	(Germany) VfL Waiblingen
23	GK	Celia Schneider	(Switzerland)	28 October 1985	2013	(Germany) TV Nellingen
55	RB	Alena Vojtíšková	(Czech Republic)	23 November 1983	2014	(Germany) Frisch Auf Göppingen
90	GK	Katrin Rüttinger	(Germany)	12 March 1990	2014	(Germany) TSG Ketsch

2015–16 squad

2015–16 2. Bundesliga (1st/16)
No.	Position	Player	Nationality	Date of birth	Year signed	Signed from
2	LW	Selina Kalmbach	(Germany)	24 March 1998	2014	(Germany) SG AbsUbaScho
3	LB	Lena Hoffmann	(Germany)	5 January 1991	2012	(Germany) TV Großbottwar
4	CB	Louisa Wolf	(Germany)	16 July 1994	2014	(Germany) TV Nellingen
5	LW	Hannah Breitinger	(Germany)	20 August 1987	2011	(Spain) BM Murcia
6	RW	Luisa Gerber	(Germany)	12 February 1988	2012	(Germany) TV Pflugfelden
7	P	Kathrin Fischer	(Germany)	25 April 1989	2011	(Germany) VfL Sindelfingen
8	CB	Svenja Kaufmann	(Germany)	23 January 1994	2010	(Germany) Sport-Union Neckarsulm U17
9	RB	Isabel Tissekker	(Germany)	5 February 1994	2010	(Germany) Sport-Union Neckarsulm U17
10	CB	Maike Daniels	(Germany)	29 May 1985	2015	(Germany) Frisch Auf Göppingen
18	P	Seline Ineichen	(Switzerland)	8 August 1990	2015	(Germany) Frisch Auf Göppingen
21	GK	Melanie Herrmann	(Austria)	3 August 1989	2015	(Germany) Frisch Auf Göppingen
23	GK	Celia Schneider	(Switzerland)	28 October 1985	2013	(Germany) TV Nellingen
55	RB	Alena Vojtíšková	(Czech Republic)	23 November 1983	2014	(Germany) Frisch Auf Göppingen
66	LW	Katharina Beddies	(Germany)	7 February 1994	2015	(Germany) TuS Metzingen
90	GK	Katrin Rüttinger	(Germany)	12 March 1990	2014	(Germany) TSG Ketsch

2016–17 squad

2016–17 Bundesliga (12th/14)
No.	Position	Player	Nationality	Date of birth	Year signed	Signed from
2	LW	Selina Kalmbach	(Germany)	24 March 1998	2014	(Germany) SG AbsUbaScho
3	LB	Lena Hoffmann	(Germany)	5 January 1991	2012	(Germany) TV Großbottwar
5	LW	Hannah Breitinger	(Germany)	20 August 1987	2011	(Spain) BM Murcia
6	RW	Luisa Gerber	(Germany)	12 February 1988	2012	(Germany) TV Pflugfelden
7	P	Kathrin Fischer	(Germany)	25 April 1989	2011	(Germany) VfL Sindelfingen
8	CB	Svenja Kaufmann	(Germany)	23 January 1994	2010	(Germany) Sport-Union Neckarsulm U17
9	RB	Isabel Tissekker	(Germany)	5 February 1994	2010	(Germany) Sport-Union Neckarsulm U17
10	CB	Maike Daniels	(Germany)	29 May 1985	2015	(Germany) Frisch Auf Göppingen
11	RB	Nives Ahlin	(Slovenia)	14 July 1991	2016	(Germany) SVG Celle
16	GK	Mirjana Milenković	(Montenegro)	14 March 1985	2016	(Croatia) RK Podravka Koprivnica
18	P	Seline Ineichen	(Switzerland)	8 August 1990	2015	(Germany) Frisch Auf Göppingen
21	GK	Melanie Herrmann	(Austria)	3 August 1989	2015	(Germany) Frisch Auf Göppingen
23	GK	Celia Schneider	(Switzerland)	28 October 1985	2013	(Germany) TV Nellingen
24	RW	Milana Vlahovic	(Germany)	29 May 1997	2016	(Germany) SG BBM Bietigheim
26	CB	Emilia Galińska	(Poland)	26 December 1992	2016	(Poland) GTPR Gdynia
55	RB	Alena Vojtíšková	(Czech Republic)	23 November 1983	2014	(Germany) Frisch Auf Göppingen
90	GK	Katrin Rüttinger	(Germany)	12 March 1990	2014	(Germany) TSG Ketsch

2017–18 squad

2017–18 Bundesliga (13th/14)
No.	Position	Player	Nationality	Date of birth	Year signed	Signed from
2	LW	Selina Kalmbach	(Germany)	24 March 1998	2014	(Germany) SG AbsUbaScho
3	LB	Lena Hoffmann	(Germany)	5 January 1991	2012	(Germany) TV Großbottwar
4	P	Mette Gravholt	(Denmark)	12 December 1984	2017	(Denmark) Nykøbing Falster HK
5	LW	Hannah Breitinger	(Germany)	20 August 1987	2011	(Spain) BM Murcia
6	RW	Luisa Gerber	(Germany)	12 February 1988	2012	(Germany) TV Pflugfelden
7	RB	Linda Mack	(Germany)	2 December 1991	2017	(Germany) SG BBM Bietigheim
8	CB	Svenja Kaufmann	(Germany)	23 January 1994	2010	(Germany) Sport-Union Neckarsulm U17
9	RB	Isabel Tissekker	(Germany)	5 February 1994	2010	(Germany) Sport-Union Neckarsulm U17
10	CB	Maike Daniels	(Germany)	29 May 1985	2015	(Germany) Frisch Auf Göppingen
12	GK	Annabelle Sattler	(Germany)	4 January 1998	2018	(Germany) HSG Strohgäu
14	P	Sina Namat	(Germany)	14 April 1994	2017	(Germany) TV Nellingen
16	GK	Ann-Cathrin Giegerich	(Germany)	4 Januar 1992	2017	(Germany) SG BBM Bietigheim
18	P	Seline Ineichen	(Switzerland)	8 August 1990	2015	(Germany) Frisch Auf Göppingen
20	RB	Nele Reimer	(Germany)	9 September 1996	2017	(Germany) HC Leipzig
21	GK	Melanie Herrmann	(Austria)	3 August 1989	2015	(Germany) Frisch Auf Göppingen
55	RB	Alena Vojtíšková	(Czech Republic)	23 November 1983	2014	(Germany) Frisch Auf Göppingen
63	GK	Valeria Gorelova	(Russia)	2 May 1995	2018	(Portugal) Madeira Andebol
45	RB	Mia Møldrup	(Denmark)	6 April 1991	2018	(Denmark) København Håndbold
99	GK	Jana Brausch	(Germany)	7 July 1999	2017	(Germany) TV Möglingen

2018–19 squad

2018–19 Bundesliga (12th/14)
No.	Position	Player	Nationality	Date of birth	Year signed	Signed from
2	LW	Selina Kalmbach	(Germany)	24 March 1998	2014	(Germany) SG AbsUbaScho
3	LB	Lena Hoffmann	(Germany)	5 January 1991	2012	(Germany) TV Großbottwar
4	CB	Louisa Wolf	(Germany)	16 July 1994	2018	(Germany) TV Nellingen
5	RB	Roberta Ivanauskaitė	(Lithuania)	26 June 1996	2018	(Denmark) Fredericia HK
6	LB	Trixi Hanak	(Germany)	6 August 1999	2018	(Germany) Sport-Union Neckarsulm II
7	RW	Ana Pavković	(Netherlands)	28 October 1995	2018	(Netherlands) SV Dalfsen
8	CB	Svenja Kaufmann	(Germany)	23 January 1994	2010	(Germany) Sport-Union Neckarsulm U17
12	GK	Melanie Herrmann	(Austria)	3 August 1989	2015	(Germany) Frisch Auf Göppingen
14	P	Sina Namat	(Germany)	14 April 1994	2017	(Germany) TV Nellingen
15	LW	Michelle Goos	(Netherlands)	27 December 1989	2018	(Germany) Buxtehuder SV
16	GK	Nicole Roth	(Germany)	8 May 1995	2018	(Germany) SG BBM Bietigheim
17	P	Ljubica Pavlović	(Serbia)	26 March 1993	2018	(Israel) Hapoel Petah Tikva
18	P	Seline Ineichen	(Switzerland)	8 August 1990	2015	(Germany) Frisch Auf Göppingen
20	RB	Nele Reimer	(Germany)	9 September 1996	2017	(Germany) HC Leipzig
21	RB	Irene Espínola Pérez	(Spain)	19 December 1992	2018	(Germany) Borussia Dortmund
23	RB	Simona Stojkovska	(North Macedonia)	2 November 1993	2018	(Greece) P.A.O.K.
63	GK	Valeria Gorelova	(Russia)	2 May 1995	2018	(Portugal) Madeira Andebol

2019–20 squad

2019–20 Bundesliga (9th/14)
No.	Position	Player	Nationality	Date of birth	Year signed	Signed from
2	LW	Selina Kalmbach	(Germany)	24 March 1998	2014	(Germany) SG AbsUbaScho
4	CB	Louisa Wolf	(Germany)	16 July 1994	2018	(Germany) TV Nellingen
6	RW	Nathalie Hendrikse	(Netherlands)	4 April 1995	2019	(Norway) Gjerpen HK Skien
7	CB	Lynn Knippenborg	(Netherlands)	7 January 1992	2019	(Denmark) TTH Holstebro
8	LB	Chantal Wick	(Switzerland)	24 February 1994	2019	(Switzerland) Spono Eagles
9	RB	Birna Berg Haraldsdóttir	(Iceland)	21 June 1993	2019	(Denmark) Aarhus United
10	RW	Lucija Zeba	(Croatia)	24 March 1999	2019	(Croatia) RK Lokomotiva Zagreb
12	GK	Sarah Wachter	(Germany)	16 December 1999	2019	(Germany) TV Nellingen
15	LW	Michelle Goos	(Netherlands)	27 December 1989	2018	(Germany) Buxtehuder SV
18	P	Seline Ineichen	(Switzerland)	8 August 1990	2015	(Germany) Frisch Auf Göppingen
20	RB	Nele Reimer	(Germany)	9 September 1996	2017	(Germany) HC Leipzig
21	RB	Irene Espínola Pérez	(Spain)	19 December 1992	2018	(Germany) Borussia Dortmund
23	P	Jill Kooij	(Netherlands)	30 April 1996	2019	(Netherlands) SV Dalfsen
33	RB	Lucie-Marie Kretzschmar	(Germany)	7 August 2000	2019	(Germany) HC Leipzig
73	GK	Oliwia Kamińska	(Poland)	9 September 1998	2019	(Sweden) Skara HF

2020–21 squad

2020–21 Bundesliga (6th/16)
No.	Position	Player	Nationality	Date of birth	Year signed	Signed from
1	GK	Isabel de Góis	(Portugal)	10 October 1995	2020	(Germany) SV Union Halle-Neustadt
2	LW	Selina Kalmbach	(Germany)	24 March 1998	2014	(Germany) SG AbsUbaScho
4	CB	Louisa Wolf	(Germany)	16 July 1994	2018	(Germany) TV Nellingen
6	RW	Nathalie Hendrikse	(Netherlands)	4 April 1995	2019	(Norway) Gjerpen HK Skien
7	CB	Lynn Knippenborg	(Netherlands)	7 January 1992	2019	(Denmark) TTH Holstebro
8	LB	Chantal Wick	(Switzerland)	24 February 1994	2019	(Switzerland) Spono Eagles
12	GK	Sarah Wachter	(Germany)	16 December 1999	2019	(Germany) TV Nellingen
18	P	Sara Šenvald	(Croatia)	14 March 1996	2020	(Croatia) RK Lokomotiva Zagreb
21	RB	Irene Espínola Pérez	(Spain)	19 December 1992	2018	(Germany) Borussia Dortmund
23	P	Jill Kooij	(Netherlands)	30 April 1996	2019	(Netherlands) SV Dalfsen
26	RB	Anouk Nieuwenweg	(Netherlands)	20 August 1996	2020	(Germany) Thüringer HC
33	RB	Lucie-Marie Kretzschmar	(Germany)	7 August 2000	2019	(Germany) HC Leipzig
34	LW	Joanna Rode	(Germany)	30 July 1997	2020	(Germany) Bayer 04 Leverkusen
73	GK	Oliwia Kamińska	(Poland)	9 September 1998	2019	(Sweden) Skara HF
77	LB	Carmen Moser	(Germany)	7 March 1995	2020	(Germany) TSG Ketsch

2021–22 squad

2021–22 Bundesliga (7th/14)
No.	Position	Player	Nationality	Date of birth	Year signed	Signed from
1	GK	Isabel de Góis	(Portugal)	10 October 1995	2020	(Germany) SV Union Halle-Neustadt
2	LW	Selina Kalmbach	(Germany)	24 March 1998	2014	(Germany) SG AbsUbaScho
3	P	Sharon Nooitmeer	(Netherlands)	11 June 1999	2021	(France) HB Octeville Sur Mer
4	RB	Svenja Mann	(Germany)	22 January 2001	2021	(Germany) SG Schozach-Bottwartal
6	RW	Nathalie Hendrikse	(Netherlands)	4 April 1995	2019	(Norway) Gjerpen HK Skien
7	CB	Lynn Knippenborg	(Netherlands)	7 January 1992	2019	(Denmark) TTH Holstebro
9	LW	Natalie Mann	(Germany)	22 January 2001	2021	(Germany) Sport-Union Neckarsulm II
10	RB	Daphne Gautschi	(Switzerland)	9 July 2000	2021	(France) Metz Handball
11	LB	Laila Ihlefeldt	(Germany)	22 March 2002	2021	(Germany) TV Möglingen
12	GK	Sarah Wachter	(Germany)	16 December 1999	2019	(Germany) TV Nellingen
18	LW	Johanna Stockschläder	(Germany)	11 February 1995	2021	(Germany) Borussia Dortmund
20	RB	Nele Reimer	(Germany)	9 September 1996	2021	(Germany) SG BBM Bietigheim
21	RB	Irene Espínola Pérez	(Spain)	19 December 1992	2018	(Germany) Borussia Dortmund
23	P	Jill Kooij	(Netherlands)	30 April 1996	2019	(Netherlands) SV Dalfsen
26	RB	Anouk Nieuwenweg	(Netherlands)	20 August 1996	2020	(Germany) Thüringer HC
32	CB	Sophie Lütke	(Germany)	8 March 1990	2021	(Germany) SV Union Halle-Neustadt
33	RB	Lucie-Marie Kretzschmar	(Germany)	7 August 2000	2019	(Germany) HC Leipzig
77	LB	Carmen Moser	(Germany)	7 March 1995	2020	(Germany) TSG Ketsch

2022–23 squad

2022–23 Bundesliga (12th/14)
No.	Position	Player	Nationality	Date of birth	Year signed	Signed from
1	GK	Valentyna Salamakha	(Azerbaijan)	23 April 1986	2022	(Romania) CS Gloria Bistrița
2	LB	Laila Ihlefeldt	(Germany)	22 March 2002	2021	(Germany) TV Möglingen
3	P	Sharon Nooitmeer	(Netherlands)	11 June 1999	2021	(France) HB Octeville Sur Mer
4	RB	Svenja Mann	(Germany)	22 January 2001	2021	(Germany) SG Schozach-Bottwartal
5	RW	Amber Verbraeken	(Netherlands)	5 Juli 2002	2022	(Netherlands) RKHV Quintus
6	RW	Tija Gomilar Zickero	(Slovenia)	12 May 2000	2022	(Slovenia) RK Krim
7	CB	Fatos Kücükyildiz	(Sweden)	30 September 1992	2022	(Germany) Borussia Dortmund
9	CB	Olga Gorshenina	(Russia)	9 November 1990	2022	(Romania) SCM Râmnicu Vâlcea
10	RB	Daphne Gautschi	(Switzerland)	9 July 2000	2021	(France) Metz Handball
11	CB	Annefleur Bruggeman	(Netherlands)	23 July 1997	2022	(Germany) Bayer 04 Leverkusen
12	GK	Sarah Wachter	(Germany)	16 December 1999	2019	(Germany) TV Nellingen
13	P	Luisa Schulze	(Germany)	14 September 1990	2022	(Germany) SG BBM Bietigheim
15	GK	Anita Poláčková	(Czech Republic)	27 May 2003	2022	(Czech Republic) DHK Zora Olomouc
21	CB	Sophie Lütke	(Germany)	8 March 1990	2021	(Germany) SV Union Halle-Neustadt
23	LB	Munia Smits	Belgian-German	23 December 1999	2022	(Germany) HSG Bad Wildungen
25	RB	Nina Engel	(Germany)	25 April 2003	2022	(Germany) SV Werder Bremen
33	LW	Marthine Svendsberget	(Norway)	14 January 2001	2022	(Norway) Aker Topphåndball
77	LB	Carmen Moser	(Germany)	7 March 1995	2020	(Germany) TSG Ketsch

2023–24 squad

2023–24 Bundesliga (10th/14)
No.	Position	Player	Nationality	Date of birth	Year signed	Signed from
1	GK	Valentyna Salamakha	(Azerbaijan)	23 April 1986	2022	(Romania) CS Gloria Bistrița
3	P	Sharon Nooitmeer	(Netherlands)	11 June 1999	2021	(France) HB Octeville Sur Mer
5	RW	Amber Verbraeken	(Netherlands)	5 Juli 2002	2022	(Netherlands) RKHV Quintus
8	RW	Vasiliki Gkatziou	(Greece)	8 October 1997	2023	(Spain) BM Remudas
10	CB	Fatos Özdemir	(Sweden)	30 September 1992	2022	(Germany) Borussia Dortmund
11	CB	Annefleur Bruggeman	(Netherlands)	23 July 1997	2022	(Germany) Bayer 04 Leverkusen
17	LB	Arwen Gorb	(Germany)	20 June 2002	2023	(Germany) TSG Ketsch
18	RW	Marloes Hoitzing	(Netherlands)	25 January 2001	2023	(Germany) VfL Oldenburg
21	LW	Alessia Riner	(Switzerland)	8 January 2004	2023	(Switzerland) LK Zug
23	LB	Munia Smits	Belgian-German	23 December 1999	2022	(Germany) HSG Bad Wildungen
25	RB	Nina Engel	(Germany)	25 April 2003	2022	(Germany) SV Werder Bremen
29	GK	Lena Ivančok	(Austria)	29 March 2001	2023	(Croatia) RK Lokomotiva Zagreb
55	LW	Rabea Pollakowski	(Germany)	26 February 1998	2023	(Germany) VfL Waiblingen
75	P	Kim Hinkelmann	(Germany)	16 October 2001	2023	(Denmark) Holstebro Håndbold
81	LB	Agni Zygoura	(Greece)	4 February 1996	2023	(Greece) P.A.O.K.
97	LB	Veronika Andrýsková	(Czech Republic)	24 May 1997	2023	(Czech Republic) DHK Baník Most

2024–25 squad

2024–25 Bundesliga (9th/12)
No.	Position	Player	Nationality	Date of birth	Year signed	Signed from
5	P	Kim Hinkelmann	(Germany)	16 October 2001	2023	(Denmark) Holstebro Håndbold
7	LB	Angunn Gudmestad	(Norway)	8 May 2001	2024	(Norway) Aker Topphåndball
8	RW	Vasiliki Gkatziou	(Greece)	8 October 1997	2023	(Spain) BM Remudas
10	CB	Sina Hagen	(Germany)	12 October 1996	2024	(Germany) Buxtehuder SV
11	CB	Annefleur Bruggeman	(Netherlands)	23 July 1997	2022	(Germany) Bayer 04 Leverkusen
12	GK	Johanna Fossum	(Norway)	25 January 2003	2024	(Norway) Sola HK
17	CB	Lynn Holtman	(Netherlands)	7 July 2004	2024	(Netherlands) Westfriesland SEW
19	RW	Iva van der Linden	(Netherlands)	19 April 1998	2024	(Sweden) Boden Handboll IF
21	LW	Alessia Riner	(Switzerland)	8 January 2004	2023	(Switzerland) LK Zug
23	LB	Munia Smits	Belgian-German	23 December 1999	2022	(Germany) HSG Bad Wildungen
29	GK	Lena Ivančok	(Austria)	29 March 2001	2023	(Croatia) RK Lokomotiva Zagreb
55	LW	Rabea Pollakowski	(Germany)	26 February 1998	2023	(Germany) VfL Waiblingen
58	RB	Lilli Holste	(Germany)	25 April 2001	2024	(Germany) HSG Bensheim/Auerbach
66	GK	Aleksandra Orowicz	(Poland)	7 September 1996	2024	(Germany) SG 09 Kirchhof
92	P	Stefanie Kaiser	(Austria)	31 October 1992	2024	(Germany) HSG Blomberg-Lippe
97	LB	Veronika Andrýsková	(Czech Republic)	24 May 1997	2023	(Czech Republic) DHK Baník Most

2025–26 squad

2025–26 Bundesliga (9th/12)
No.	Position	Player	Nationality	Date of birth	Year signed	Signed from
5	P	Kim Hinkelmann	(Germany)	16 October 2001	2023	(Denmark) Holstebro Håndbold
7	LB	Angunn Gudmestad	(Norway)	8 May 2001	2024	(Norway) Aker Topphåndball
11	CB	Annefleur Bruggeman	(Netherlands)	23 July 1997	2022	(Germany) Bayer 04 Leverkusen
12	GK	Johanna Fossum	(Norway)	25 January 2003	2024	(Norway) Sola HK
13	LB	Alicia Soffel	(Germany)	11 February 1999	2025	(Germany) HSG Bensheim/Auerbach
14	LB	Kamila Kordovská	(Czech Republic)	4 December 1997	2025	(France) Handball Plan-de-Cuques
17	CB	Lynn Holtman	(Netherlands)	7 July 2004	2024	(Netherlands) Westfriesland SEW
19	RW	Iva van der Linden	(Netherlands)	19 April 1998	2024	(Sweden) Boden Handboll IF
21	LW	Alessia Riner	(Switzerland)	8 January 2004	2023	(Switzerland) LK Zug
22	RW	Meret Ossenkopp	(Germany)	21 Juni 1998	2025	(Germany) HL Buchholz 08-Rosengarten
23	LB	Munia Smits	Belgian-German	23 December 1999	2022	(Germany) HSG Bad Wildungen
29	GK	Lena Ivančok	(Austria)	29 March 2001	2023	(Croatia) RK Lokomotiva Zagreb
39	P	Merle Albers	(Germany)	19 April 2004	2025	(France) Palente Besançon Handball
58	RB	Lilli Holste	(Germany)	25 April 2001	2024	(Germany) HSG Bensheim/Auerbach
59	LW	Antje Döll	(Germany)	3 October 1988	2025	(Germany) HB Ludwigsburg
78	LB	Paulina Uścinowicz	(Poland)	16 October 1999	2025	(Germany) HSV Solingen-Gräfrath

=== Appearances and Goalscorers ===
Competitive matches and goals in the Bundesliga only.^{[A]} As of 1 June 2026.

Most appearances
Rank	Player	Years	Games
1	(Germany) Selina Kalmbach	2016–2022	134
2	(Netherlands) Annefleur Bruggeman	2022–	102
3	(Germany) Sarah Wachter	2019–2023	97
4	(Spain) Irene Espínola Pérez	2018–2022	95
5	(Switzerland) Seline Ineichen	2016–2020	91
6	(Germany) Nele Reimer	2017–2020; 2021–2022	82
7	(Netherlands) Sharon Nooitmeer	2021–2024	75
8	(Netherlands) Lynn Knippenborg	2019–2022	72
9	(Netherlands) Nathalie Hendrikse	2019–2022	72
10	(Netherlands) Jill Kooij	2019–2022	72

Top goalscorers
Rank	Player	Years	Games	Goals	Ratio
1	(Spain) Irene Espínola Pérez	2018–2022	95	420	4.42
2	(Germany) Nele Reimer	2017–2020; 2021–2022	82	361	4.40
3	(Netherlands) Lynn Knippenborg	2019–2022	72	324	4.50
4	Munia Smits	2022–	67	307	4.58
5	(Netherlands) Nathalie Hendrikse	2019–2022	72	280	3.89
6	(Germany) Nina Engel	2022–2024	50	263	5.26
7	(Switzerland) Seline Ineichen	2016–2020	91	206	2.26
8	(Germany) Selina Kalmbach	2016–2022	134	205	1.53
9	(Germany) Lena Hoffmann	2016–2019	52	191	3.67
10	(Netherlands) Jill Kooij	2019–2022	72	183	2.54

A. Including playoff/playdown matches and goals.

=== Former coaches ===
Competitive matches in the Bundesliga only.^{[A]} As of 1 June 2026.

Coach	Nat.	From	To	G	W	D	L	Win%^{[B]}	PPG	Honours	Notes
Stefan Arnold	(Germany)	07/2009	06/2010	—	−	−	−	—	-		
Emir Hadžimuhamedović	(Bosnia and Herzegovina)	07/2010	02/2018	38	9	2	27	23.68	0.53	1 2. Bundesliga; 1 3. Liga; 1 BW-Oberliga; 1 Württembergliga; 2 HVW-Pokal	
Annamária Ilyés (Caretaker)	(Hungary)	02/2018	03/2018	7	0	0	7	0.00	0.00		
Tanja Logvin	(Austria)	04/2018	06/2018	7	1	1	5	14.29	0.43		
Pascal Morgant	(Germany)	07/2018	01/2020	37	9	1	27	24.32	0.51		
Maike Daniels (Caretaker)	(Germany)	01/2020	06/2020	7	3	0	4	42.86	0.86		
Tanja Logvin	(Austria)	07/2020	01/2023	67	32	3	32	47.76	1.00		
Mart Aalderink (Caretaker)	(Netherlands)	01/2023	06/2023	14	5	1	8	35.71	0.79		
Thomas Zeitz	(Germany)	07/2023	Present	76	26	2	48	34.21	0.71		

A. Including playoff/playdown matches.
B. Win percentage is rounded to two decimal places.

== Honours ==
- 2. Bundesliga
  - Champions (1): 2016
- 3. Liga (Süd)
  - Champions (1): 2013
- Baden-Württemberg Oberliga
  - Champions (1): 2012
- Württembergliga
  - Champions (2): 2011, 2024 (Second team)
- HVW-Pokal
  - Champions (2): 2011, 2013

== Kit suppliers and shirt sponsors ==
HOME

2018–19

AWAY

2018–19

Seasons	Kit manufacturer	Main shirt sponsor	Notes
2009/10 – 2010/11	(Denmark) H_{2}O	Autohaus Weilbacher	
2011/12 – 2012/13	(Denmark) Hummel	TDS Informationstechnologie AG	
2013/2014	(Germany) ProTouch	TDS Informationstechnologie AG	
2014/2015	(Germany) ProTouch	Fujitsu	
2015/2016	(Germany) ProTouch	Bäckerei Härdtner	
2016/17 – 2020/21	(Germany) Erima	Kaufland/Lidl	
2021/22 – 2023/24	(Spain) Joma	Kaufland/Lidl	
2024/2025	(Germany) Erima	Kaufland/Lidl	
2025/26 – 2027/28	(Germany) JAKO	Schwarz Gruppe	
