= Branka Zec =

Slovenian handball player

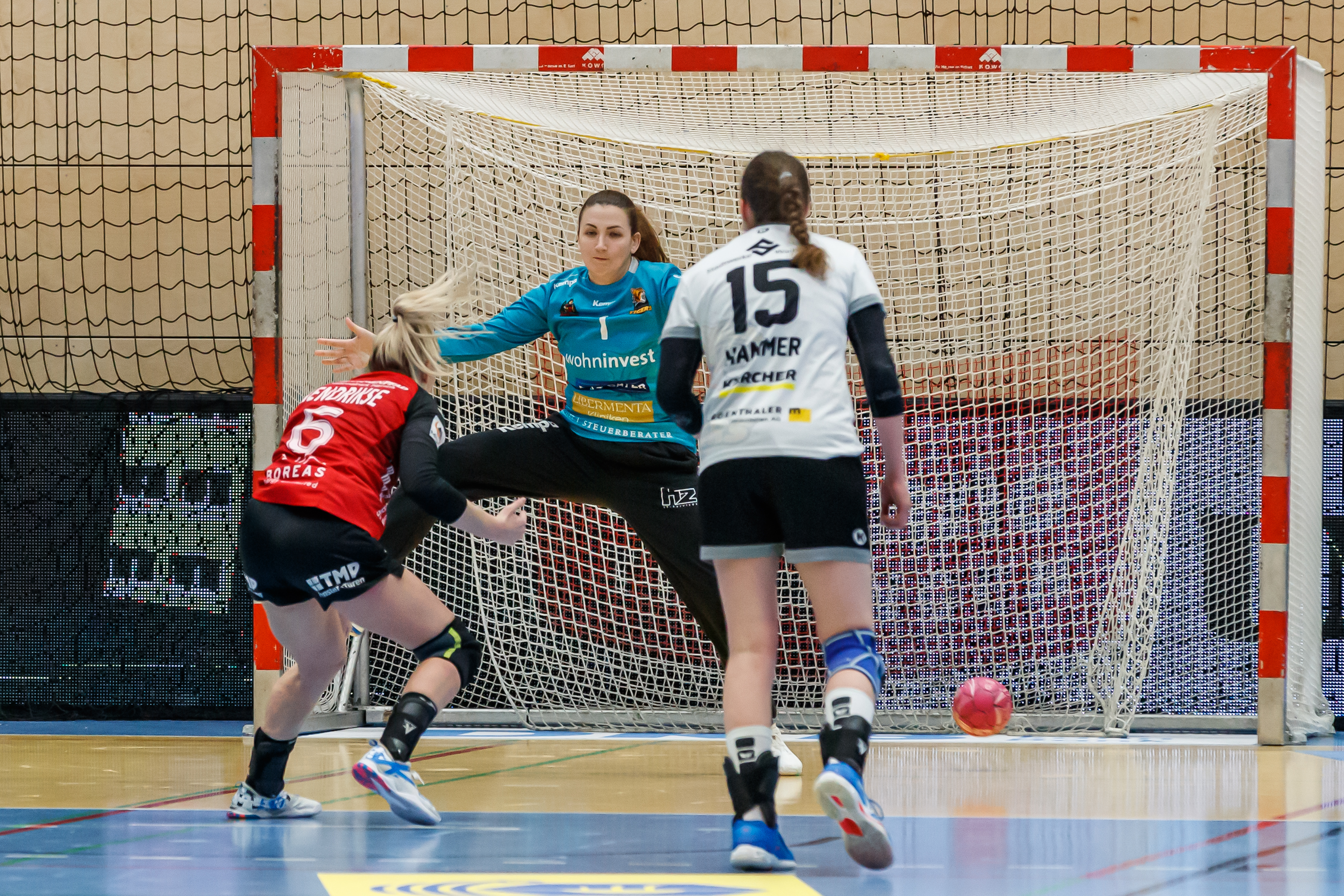

Personal information
- Nationality: Slovenian
- Born: 31 October 1986 (age 39) Ljubljana, Slovenia
- Height: 1.79 m (5 ft 10 in)

Sport
- Sport: Handball
- Position: Goalkeeper
- Current club: VfL Waiblingen
- Number: 1

Senior clubs
- Years: Team
- -2011: ŽRK Olimpija Ljubljana
- 2011-2013: ŽRK Veplas Velenje
- 2013-2016: Vulkan-Ladies Koblenz/Weibern
- 2016-2018: Bayer 04 Leverkusen
- 2018–2020: Frisch Auf Göppingen
- 2020–2023: VfL Waiblingen
National team
Years	Team	Apps	(Gls)
2006–	Slovenia	83	(1)

Teams managed
- 2024-: Sport-Union Neckarsulm
Medal record
Women's handball
Representing Slovenia
Mediterranean Games
Silver medal – second place	2013 Mersin	Team
- Updated on 1 July 2024

Branka Zec (born 31 October 1986) is a Slovenian female handball coach and former player. As a player she featured in the Slovenian national team.

She participated at the 2018 European Women's Handball Championship.

In 2024 she became the goalkeeper coach at German Bundesliga team Sport-Union Neckarsulm.
