= Thiero =

Thiero is a surname. Notable people with the name include:

- Adou Thiero (born 2004), American professional basketball player
- Simone Thiero (born 1993), French-Congolese handball player
