= Valentyna Salamakha =

Azerbaijani handball player

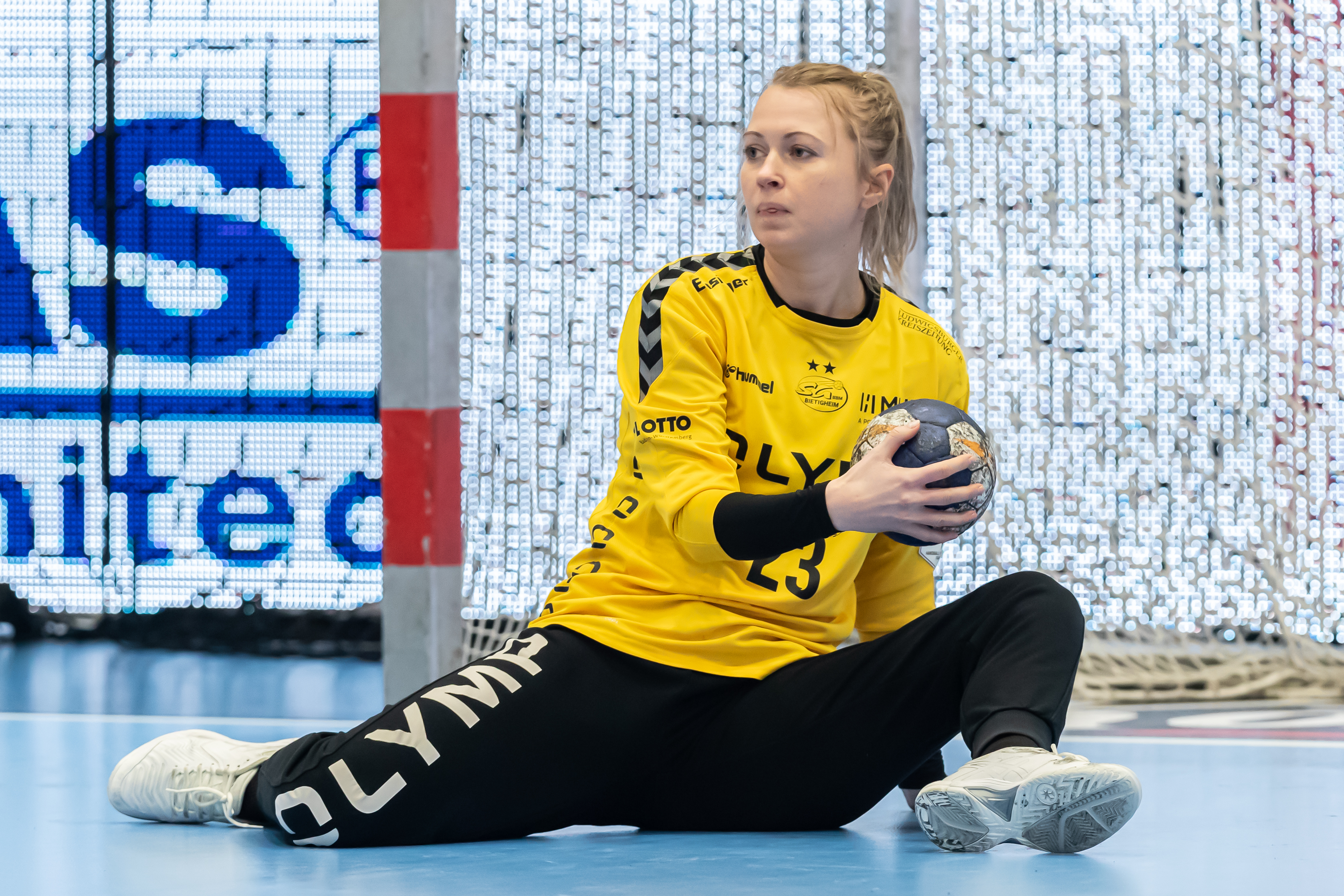

Personal information
- Full name: Valentyna Salamakha
- Nationality: Ukrainian, Azerbaijani
- Born: 23 April 1986 (age 40) Kropyvnytskyi, Ukraine
- Height: 178 cm (70 in)

Sport
- Sport: Handball
- Position: Goalkeeper

Senior clubs
- Years: Team
- 2011–2015: Bayer Leverkusen
- 2015–2016: Siófok KC
- 2016–2021: SG BBM Bietigheim
- 2021–2022: CS Gloria 2018 Bistrița-Năsăud
- 2022–2024: Neckarsulmer SU
National team
Years	Team	Apps	(Gls)
2010–2015	Azerbaijan	16	(0)

Valentyna Salamakha (Ukrainian: Валентина Саламаха born 23 April 1986) is a Ukrainian born Azerbaijani former professional handball goalkeeper who last played for Neckarsulmer SU in the Bundesliga.

== Career ==
Arriving from Bayer Leverkusen, Salamakha signed a two-year contract with Siófok KC in 2015. Just after a season the Azerbaijani international moved back to Germany, signing to SG BBM Bietigheim.
