= Irene Espínola =

Spanish handball player (born 1992)

Irene Espínola Pérez
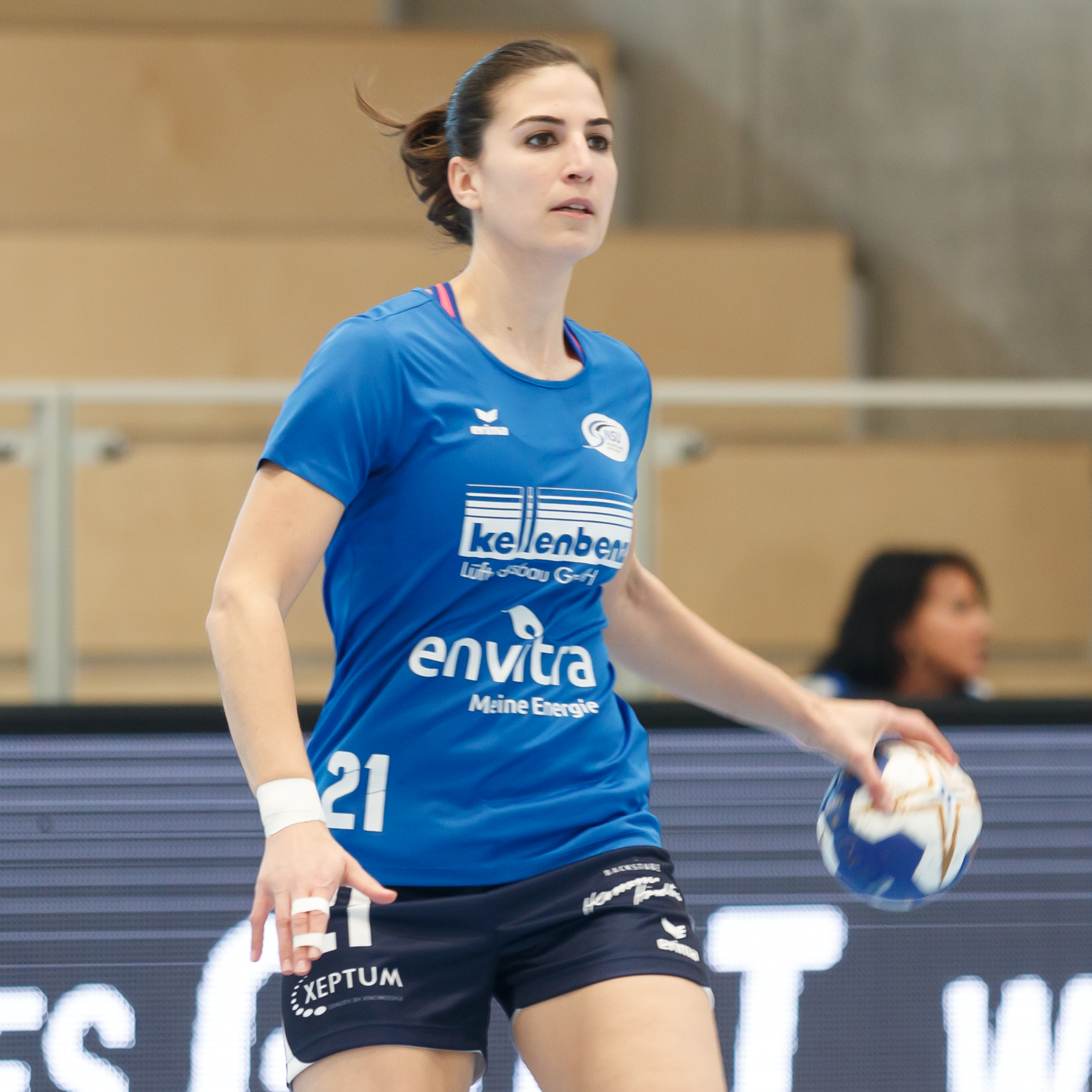

Personal information
- Full name: Irene Espínola Perez
- Nationality: Spanish
- Born: 19 December 1992 (age 33) Almuñécar, Spain
- Height: 1.84 m (6 ft 0 in)

Sport
- Sport: Handball
- Position: Right back
- Current club: Neckarsulmer SU
- Number: 21

Youth career
- Years: Team
- 2004–2009: BM Almuñécar
- 2009–2010: CBF Elda

Senior clubs
- Years: Team
- 2010–2013: CBF Elda
- 2013–2016: Oviedo BF
- 2016–2017: BM Zuazo
- 2017–2018: Borussia Dortmund
- 2018–2022: Neckarsulmer SU
- 2022–: Rapid București
National team
Years	Team	Apps	(Gls)
2017–	Spain	7	(0)

Irene Espínola Pérez (born 19 December 1992) is a Spanish handball player for Neckarsulmer SU and the Spanish national team.

She was selected as part of the Spanish 35-player squad for the 2020 European Women's Handball Championship. She was also part of the extended squad at the 2019 World Women's Handball Championship.
