= Michelle Goos =

Dutch handball player (born 1989)

Personal information
- Nationality: Dutch
- Born: 27 December 1989 (age 36) Amsterdam, Netherlands
- Height: 1.78 m (5 ft 10 in)

Sport
- Sport: Handball
- Position: Left wing
- Current club: retired

Senior clubs
- Years: Team
- –2016: VOC Amsterdam
- 2016–2018: Buxtehuder SV
- 2018–2020: Neckarsulmer Sport-Union
- 2020–2022: VOC Amsterdam
National team
Years	Team	Apps	(Gls)
2009–2022	Netherlands	83	(140)
Medal record
World Championship
Silver medal – second place	2015 Denmark
European Championship
Silver medal – second place	2016 Sweden

Michelle Goos (born 27 December 1989) is a Dutch former handball. played for Buxtehuder SV and Neckarsulmer Sport-Union in Germany, as well as VOC Amsterdam in the Netherlands. She also played for the Dutch national team.

== Career ==
Goos has never been part of any youth selections or a talent identification program.

=== 2015-16 ===
The 2015–16 season was an important season For her. In October 2015 she won with the national team the silver medal at the 2015 World Championships. After being unbeaten with VOC Amsterdam she won the regular competition. In early 2016 she qualified at the Olympic qualification tournament in France with the national team for the 2016 Summer Olympics. Goos was a reserve player, but her opponent got injured and she became in the national team. For the final against Norway she was fit, but Goos was selected by the coach to play.
