= Luisa Schulze =

German handball player (born 1990)

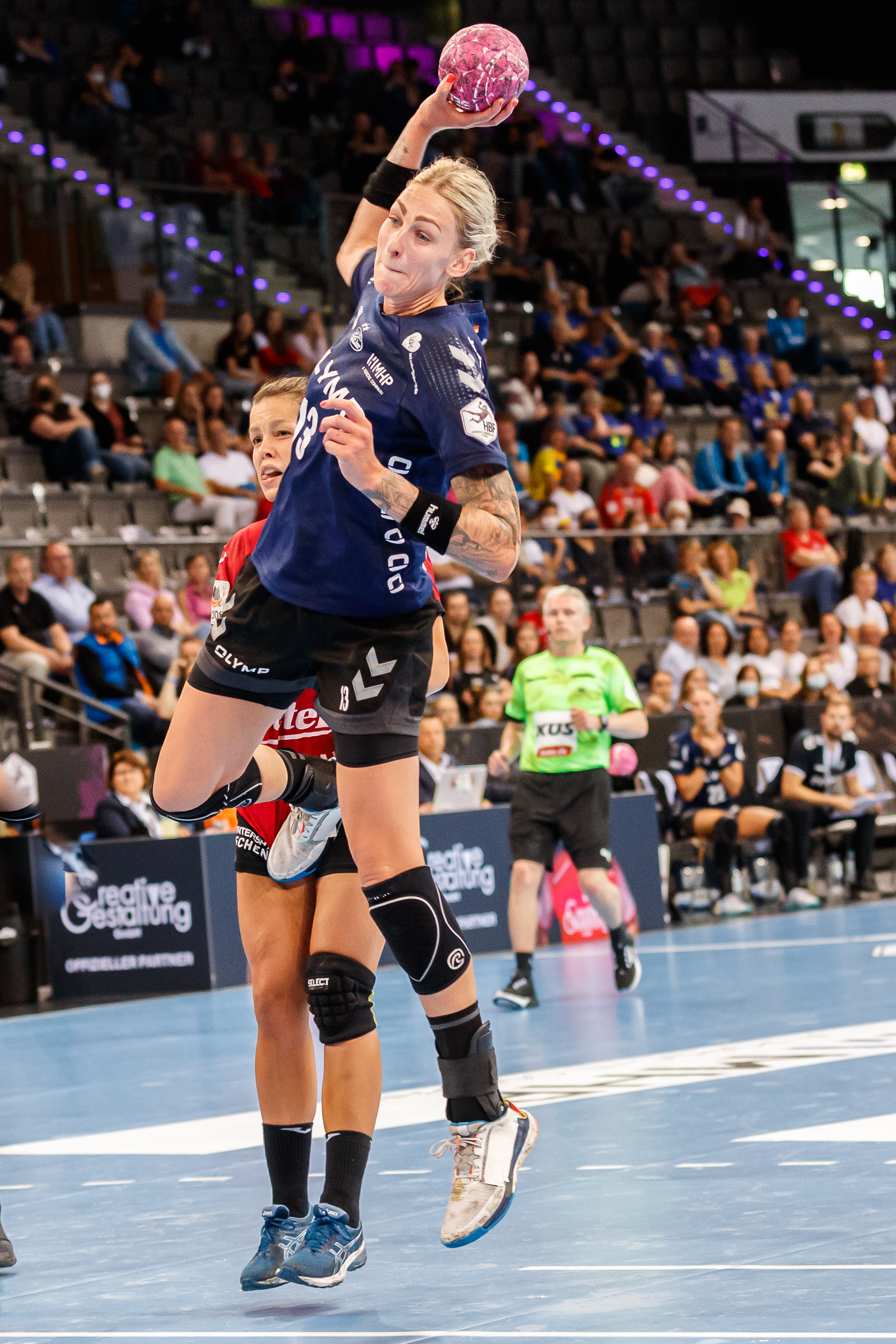

Personal information
- Nationality: German
- Born: 14 September 1990 (age 36) Altenburg, East Germany
- Height: 1.90 m (6 ft 3 in)

Sport
- Sport: Handball
- Position: Pivot
- Current club: Frisch Auf Göppingen

Senior clubs
- Years: Team
- –2006: SV Aufbau Altenburg
- 2006–2016: HC Leipzig
- 2016–2022: SG BBM Bietigheim
- 2022: Neckarsulmer SU
- 2023: Metz Handball
- 2023–2024: Vipers Kristiansand
- 2024-: Frisch Auf Göppingen
National team
Years	Team	Apps	(Gls)
2011–	Germany	132	(164)
- Updated on 5. August 2023

Luisa Schulze (born 14 September 1990) is a German handball player for Frisch Auf Göppingen and the German national team.

She participated at the 2011 World Women's Handball Championship in Brazil.

== Achievements ==
- EHF European League:
  - Winner: 2022
- Bundesliga:
  - Winner: 2017, 2019, 2022
- REMA 1000-ligaen:
  - Winner: 2023/2024
- Norwegian Cup:
  - Winner: 2023/24
