= Lena Ivančok =

Austrian handballer (born 2001)

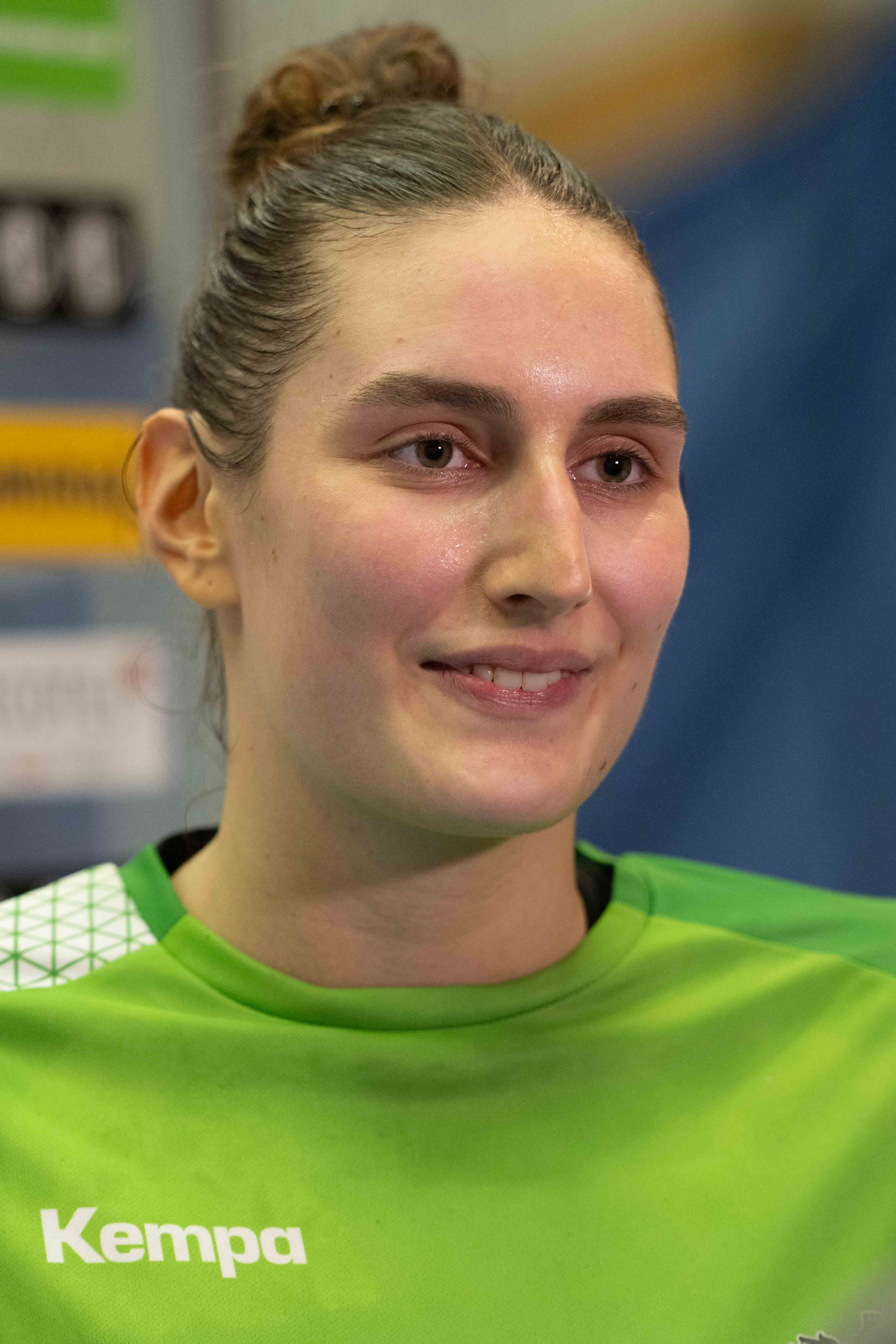
- Ivančok in 2024

Personal information
- Nationality: Austrian
- Born: 29 March 2001 (age 25) Vienna, Austria
- Height: 1.84 m (6 ft 0 in)

Sport
- Sport: Handball
- Position: Goalkeeper
- Current club: Neckarsulmer SU
- Number: 1

Senior clubs
- Years: Team
- –2020: RK Podravka Koprivnica
- 2020–2023: RK Lokomotiva Zagreb
- 2023–: Neckarsulmer SU
National team
Years	Team	Apps	(Gls)
2020–	Austria	57	(3)
- Updated on 6 November 2025

Lena Ivančok (born 29 March 2001) is an Austrian handballer for Neckarsulmer SU and the Austrian national team.

She represented Austria at the 2021 World Women's Handball Championship, placing 16th.

== Private ==
Her sister, Ines Ivančok is also a handball player.
