= Annefleur Bruggeman =

Dutch handball player (born 1997)

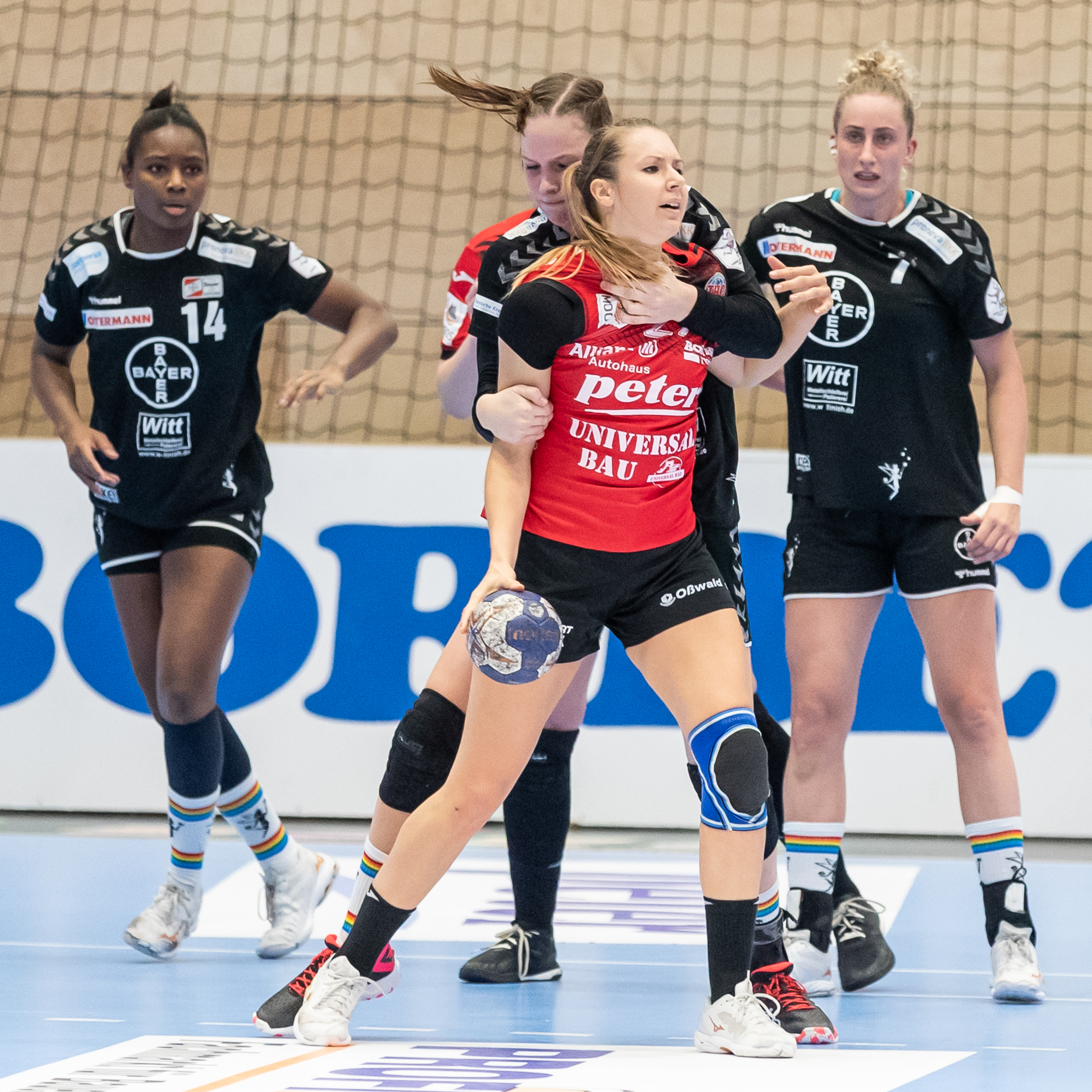
- Annefleur Bruggeman (partially covered) in a duel with Kerstin Kündig

Personal information
- Nationality: Dutch
- Born: 27 July 1997 (age 29) Echt, Netherlands
- Height: 1.81 m (5 ft 11 in)

Sport
- Sport: Handball
- Position: Left back
- Current club: Neckarsulmer SU
- Number: 11

Senior clubs
- Years: Team
- –: HV NOAV
- 2013–2016: HandbaL Venlo
- 2016–2018: Bayer Leverkusen
- 2018–2019: TuS Lintfort
- 2019–2020: TV Beyeröhde
- 2020–2022: Bayer Leverkusen
- 2022–: Neckarsulmer SU

Annefleur Bruggeman (born 27 July 1997) is a Dutch handball player for German club Neckarsulmer SU.

Bruggeman made 16 appearances for the Dutch youth national team. She participated at the 2016 U20 World Cup.

In 2022 she moved to Bundesliga club Neckarsulmer SU with a contract running until 2024.
