= Maren Weigel =

German handball player (born 1994)

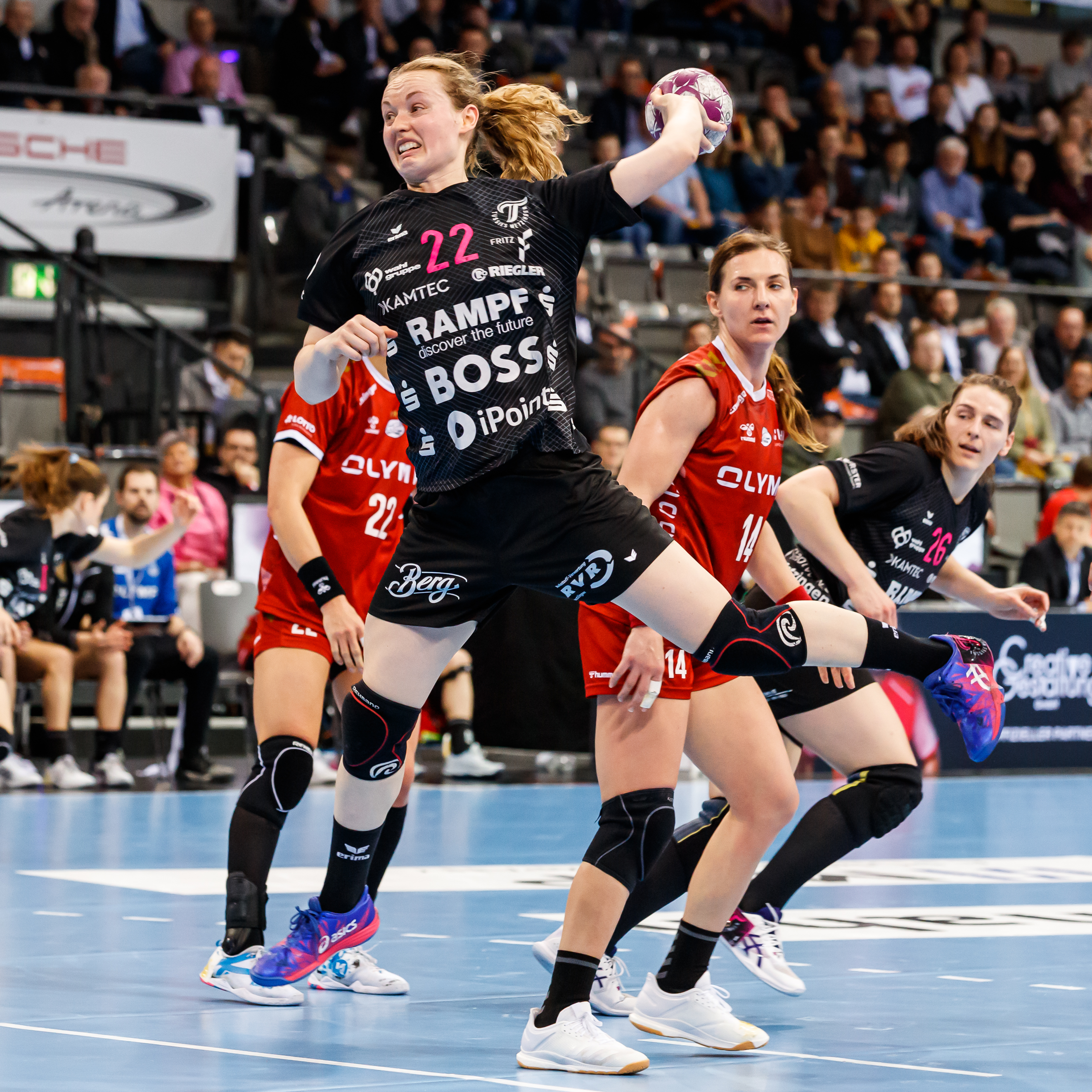
- Weigel in 2023

Personal information
- Nationality: German
- Born: 22 May 1994 (age 32) Stuttgart, Germany
- Height: 1.77 m (5 ft 10 in)

Sport
- Sport: Handball
- Position: Right back
- Current club: TuS Metzingen
- Number: 22

Youth career
- Years: Team
- –2007: SG H2Ku Herrenberg
- 2007–2008: VfL Pfullingen
- 2008–2009: HSG Schönbuch
- 2009–2011: JSG Neuhausen-Metzingen

Senior clubs
- Years: Team
- 2010–2011: TuS Metzingen
- 2011–2014: TV Nellingen
- 2014–2024: TuS Metzingen
National team
Years	Team	Apps	(Gls)
2018–	Germany	70	(76)
- Updated on 9. August 2024

Maren Weigel (born 22 May 1994) is a German female retired handball player. She played 70 matches, scoring 76 goals, for the German national team. During her senior career, she played for TuS Metzingen and TV Nellingen

She participated at the 2018 European Women's Handball Championship.

== International honours ==
- EHF Cup:
  - Finalist: 2016
