= Nele Reimer =

German handball player (born 1996)

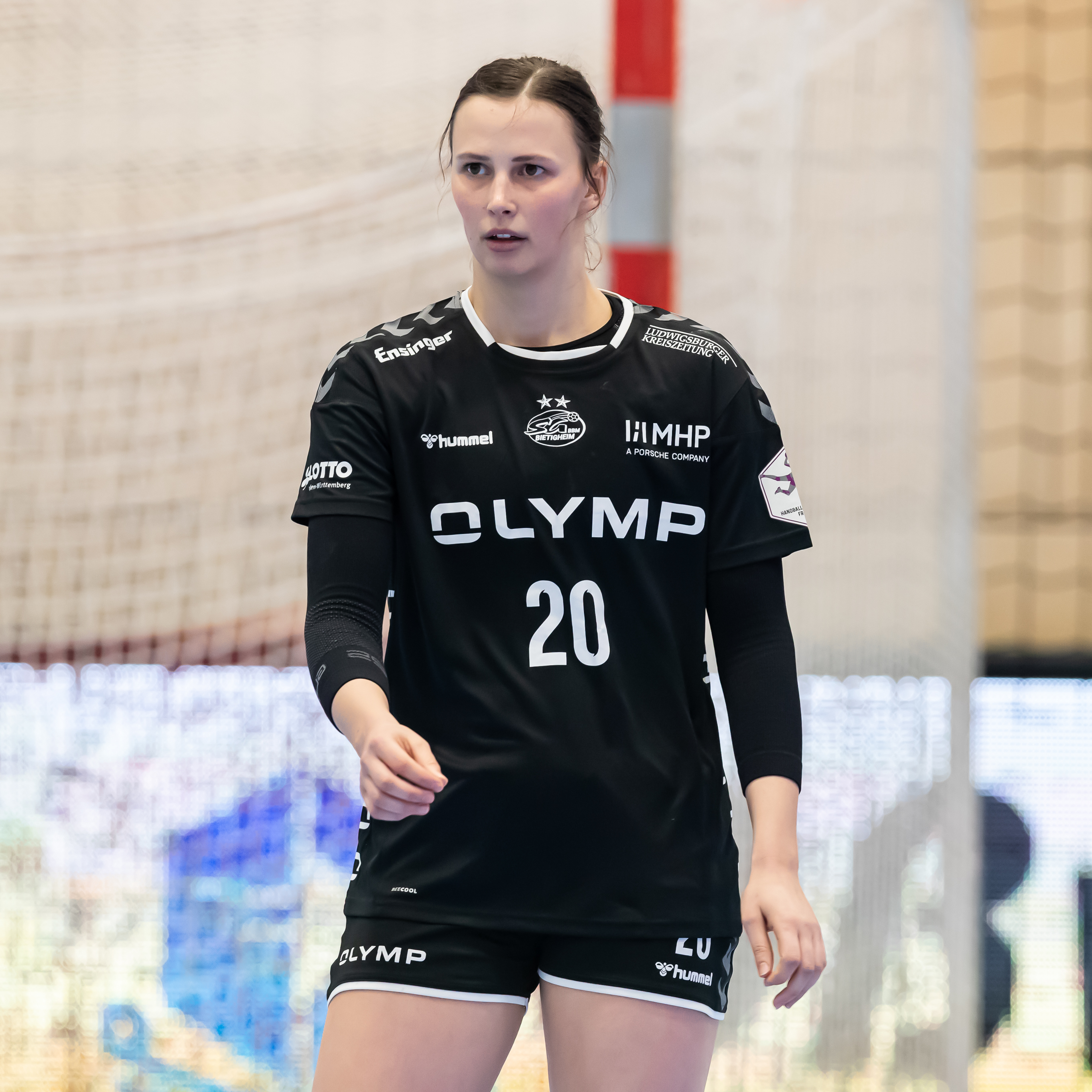

Personal information
- Nationality: German
- Born: 9 September 1996 (age 30) Rostock, Germany
- Height: 1.80 m (5 ft 11 in)

Sport
- Sport: Handball
- Position: Left Wing
- Current club: SG BBM Bietigheim
- Number: 20

Senior clubs
- Years: Team
- 2013–2017: HC Leipzig
- 2017–2020: Neckarsulmer SU
- 2020–: SG BBM Bietigheim
Medal record
IHF Youth World Championship
Silver medal – second place	2014 Macedonia

Nele Reimer (born 9 September 1996) is a German handballer who plays for SG BBM Bietigheim.

== Achievements ==
- DHB-Pokal:
  - Winner: 2016
