= Nives Ahlin =

Slovenian handball player

Personal information
- Nationality: Slovenian
- Born: 14 July 1991 (age 35) Trbovlje, Slovenia
- Height: 1.78 m (5 ft 10 in)

Sport
- Sport: Handball
- Position: Right back
- Current club: RK Zagorje

Senior clubs
- Years: Team
- –2018: TV Nellingen
- 2018–: RK Zagorje
National team
- Years: Team
- –: Slovenia
Medal record
Mediterranean Games
Bronze medal – third place	2018 Tarragona	Team

Nives Ahlin (born 14 July 1991) is a Slovenian female handball player who plays for RK Zagorje and the Slovenia national team.

== Achievements ==
- Slovenian First League:
  - Winner: 2009
