= Chantal Wick =

Swiss handball player

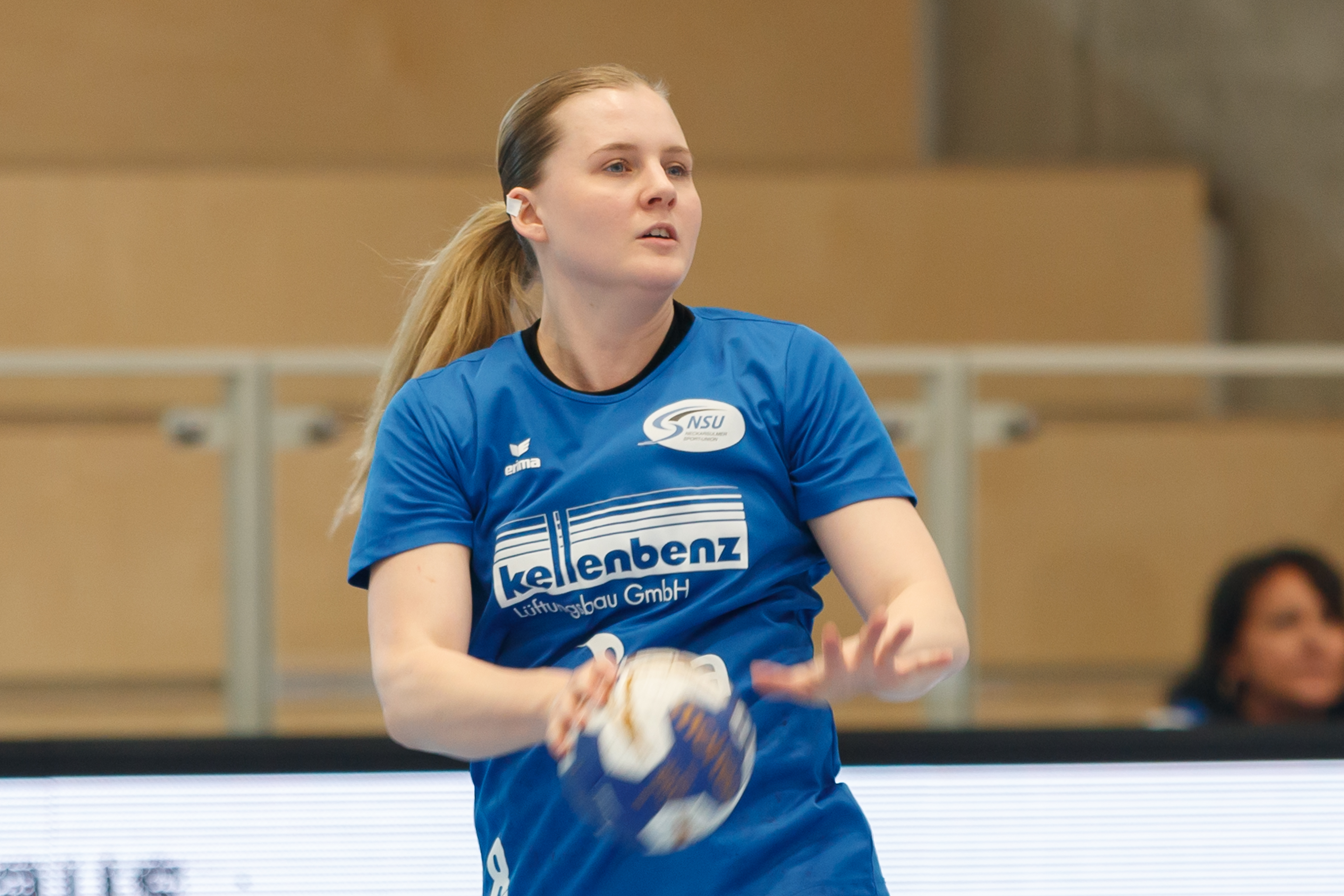

Personal information
- Full name: Chantal Wick
- Nationality: Swiss
- Born: 24 February 1994 (age 32) Zürich, Switzerland
- Height: 1.74 m (5 ft 9 in)

Sport
- Sport: Handball
- Position: Left back
- Current club: GC Amicitia Zürich
- Number: 12

Senior clubs
- Years: Team
- 2016–2019: Spono Eagles
- 2019–2021: Neckarsulmer SU
- 2021–2022: BSV Sachsen Zwickau
- 2022–2023: Ajax København
- 2023-: GC Amicitia Zürich
National team
Years	Team	Apps	(Gls)
2017–	Switzerland	55	(40)
- Updated on 14 November 2024

Chantal Wick (born 24 February 1994) is a Swiss female handballer for GC Amicitia Zürich in the swiss league and the Swiss national team.

Wick made her official debut on the Swiss national team on 23 November 2017, against Norway. She represented Switzerland for the first time at the 2022 European Women's Handball Championship in Slovenia, Montenegro and North Macedonia.

== Achievements ==
- SPAR Premium League
  - Winner: 2016, 2018
- Swiss Cup
  - Winner: 2018, 2019
