= Lynn Knippenborg =

Dutch handball player (born 1992)

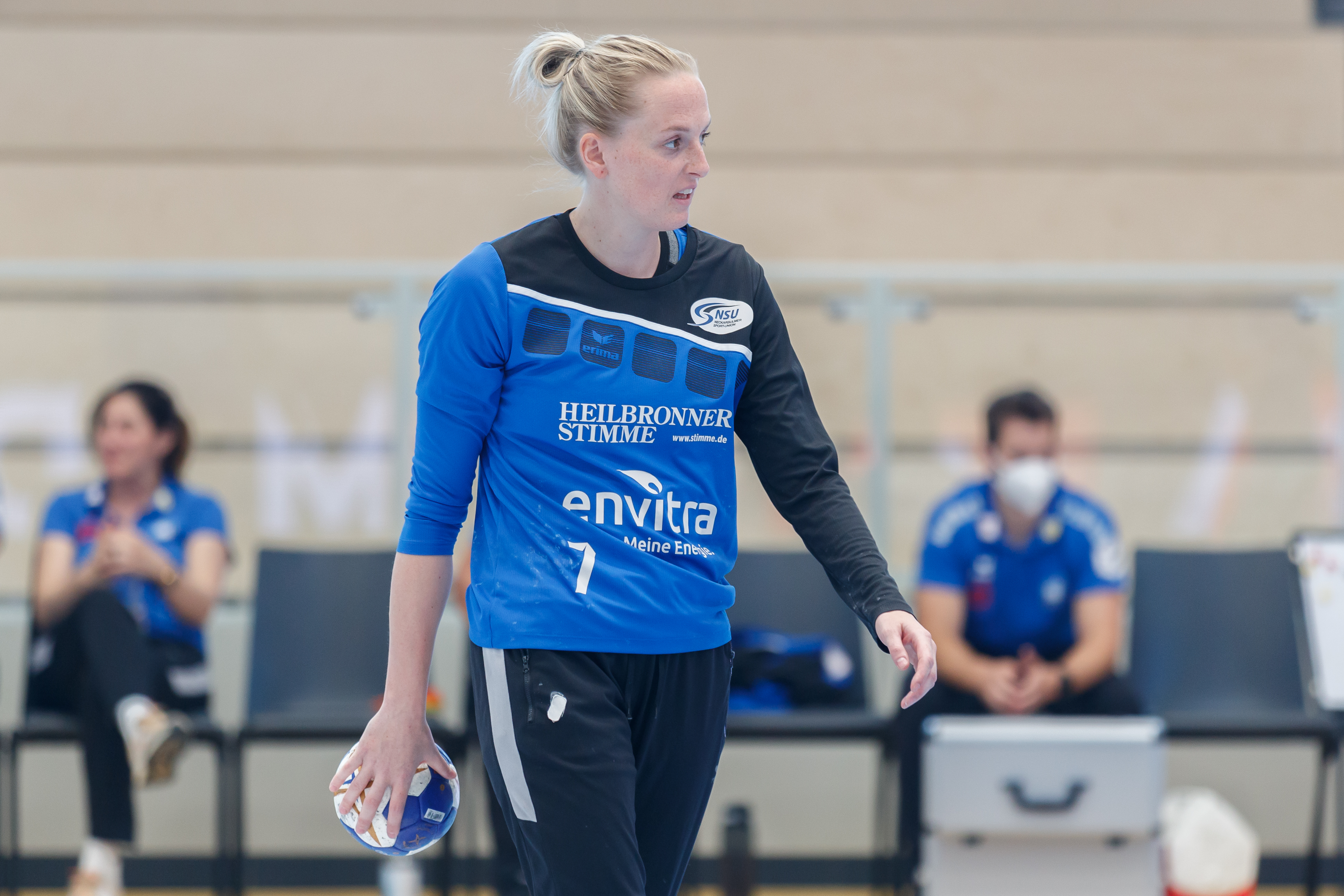

Personal information
- Nationality: Dutch
- Born: 7 January 1992 (age 34) Winterswijk, Netherlands
- Height: 1.75 m (5 ft 9 in)

Sport
- Sport: Handball
- Position: Centre back
- Current club: Neckarsulmer SU
- Number: 15
National team
Years	Team	Apps	(Gls)
2012–2022	Netherlands	114	(137)
Medal record
World Championship
Silver medal – second place	2015 Denmark
Bronze medal – third place	2017 Germany
European Championship
Silver medal – second place	2016 Sweden
Bronze medal – third place	2018 France

Lynn Knippenborg (born 7 January 1992) is a Dutch former handball player for Neckarsulmer SU.

She represented the Dutch national team at the 2014 European Women's Handball Championship.
