= Alessia Riner =

Swiss handball player

Personal information
- Full name: Alessia Riner
- Nationality: Swiss
- Born: 8 January 2004 (age 22)
- Height: 1.70 m (5 ft 7 in)

Sport
- Sport: Handball
- Position: Left wing
- Current club: Sport-Union Neckarsulm
- Number: 21

Senior clubs
- Years: Team
- 2021–2023: LK Zug
- 2023-: Sport-Union Neckarsulm
National team
Years	Team	Apps	(Gls)
2021–	Switzerland	35	(83)
- Updated on 14 November 2024

Alessia Riner (born 8 January 2004) is a Swiss female handballer for Sport-Union Neckarsulm in Germany and the Swiss national team. She has previously played for LK Zug in the Swiss Spar Premium League.

She made her official debut on the Swiss national team on 20 March 2021, against Faroe Islands. She represented Switzerland for the first time at the 2022 European Women's Handball Championship in Slovenia, Montenegro and North Macedonia.
