= Birna Berg Haraldsdóttir =

Icelandic handball player (born 1993)

Personal information
- Full name: Birna Berg Haraldsdóttir
- Nationality: Icelandic
- Born: 21 June 1993 (age 33) Reykjavík, Iceland
- Height: 1.84 m (6 ft 0 in)

Sport
- Sport: Handball
- Position: Right Back
- Current club: ÍBV
- Number: 11

Senior clubs
- Years: Team
- 2010–2013: Fram
- 2013–2015: IK Sävehof
- 2015–2017: Glassverket IF
- 2017–2019: Aarhus United
- 2019–2020: Neckarsulmer SU
- 2020–: ÍBV
National team
Years	Team	Apps	(Gls)
–	Iceland	64	(127)

Birna Berg Haraldsdóttir (born 1993) is an Icelandic team handball player for ÍBV and the Icelandic national team.

She participated at the 2011 World Women's Handball Championship in Brazil.

== Playing career ==
On 10 May 2019, Birna signed with Neckarsulmer SU of the German Bundesliga. In May 2019, she suffered a concussion after being fouled directly after scoring from a penalty.
