= Anouk Nieuwenweg =

Dutch handball player (born 1996)

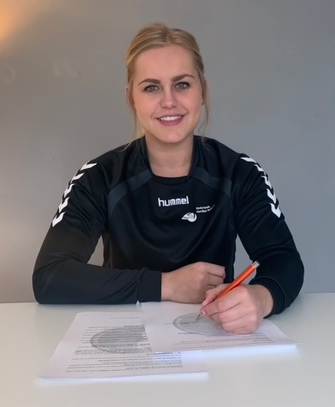

Personal information
- Full name: Anouk Nieuwenweg
- Nationality: Dutch
- Born: 20 August 1996 (age 30) Emmen, Netherlands
- Height: 1.70 m (5 ft 7 in)

Sport
- Sport: Handball
- Position: Right wing
- Current club: Neckarsulmer SU
- Number: 34

Senior clubs
- Years: Team
- –2015: E&O
- 2015–2019: HSG Bad Wildungen
- 2019–2020: Chambray Touraine Handball
- 2020: Thüringer HC
- 2020-: Neckarsulmer SU
National team
Years	Team	Apps	(Gls)
2017-	Netherlands	8	(19)
- Updated on 4 January 2026

Anouk Nieuwenweg (born 20 August 1996) is a Dutch handballer who plays for Neckarsulmer SU and the Netherlands national team.

She arrived in the summer of 2019, from Germany, in the club of Chambray Touraine Handball, in France.
