= Simona Madjovska =

Macedonian female handballer

Personal information
- Nationality: Macedonian
- Born: 2 November 1993 (age 33) Bitola, Macedonia
- Height: 1.81 m (5 ft 11 in)

Sport
- Sport: Handball
- Position: Left back
- Current club: BSV Sachsen Zwickau
- Number: 23

Senior clubs
- Years: Team
- 2013–2017: ŽRK Metalurg
- 2017–2018: P.A.O.K. H.C.
- 2018–2019: Neckarsulmer SU
- 2019–2025: BSV Sachsen Zwickau
National team
Years	Team	Apps	(Gls)
2020–	North Macedonia	37	(68)
- Updated on 28 May 2025

Simona Madjovska (born 27 July 2004) is a Macedonian female former handballer for BSV Sachsen Zwickau and the North Macedonia national team.

She represented the North Macedonia at the 2022 European Women's Handball Championship.

Madjovska started her career at ŽRK Metalurg. In 2017 she joined Greek club P.A.O.K. H.C.. A year later she moved to Germany and joined Neckarsulmer SU. In 2019 she joined the German 2nd tier team BSV Sachsen Zwickau. In the 2020–21 season she helped the team getting promoted to the Bundesliga. She retired after the 2024–25 season.
