= Tija Gomilar Zickero =

Slovenian handball player

Personal information
- Nationality: Slovenian
- Born: 12 May 2000 (age 26) Ljubljana, Slovenia
- Height: 1.705 cm (671 in)

Sport
- Sport: Handball
- Position: Right back/wing
- Number: 6

Senior clubs
- Years: Team
- 2017–2022: RK Krim
- 2022-2023: Neckarsulmer SU
National team
| Years | Team | Apps | (Gls) |
| 2020-2023 | Slovenia | 31 | (56) |

Tija Gomilar Zickero (born 12 May 2000) is a Slovenian handball player. She played for RK Krim 2017-2022, for Neckarsulmer SU 2022-2023 and for the Slovenian national team2020-2023.

She represented Slovenia at the 2020 European Women's Handball Championship, 2021 World Women's Handball Championship, 2022 European Women's Handball Championship-8th place.
