= Johanna Stockschläder =

German handball player (born 1995)

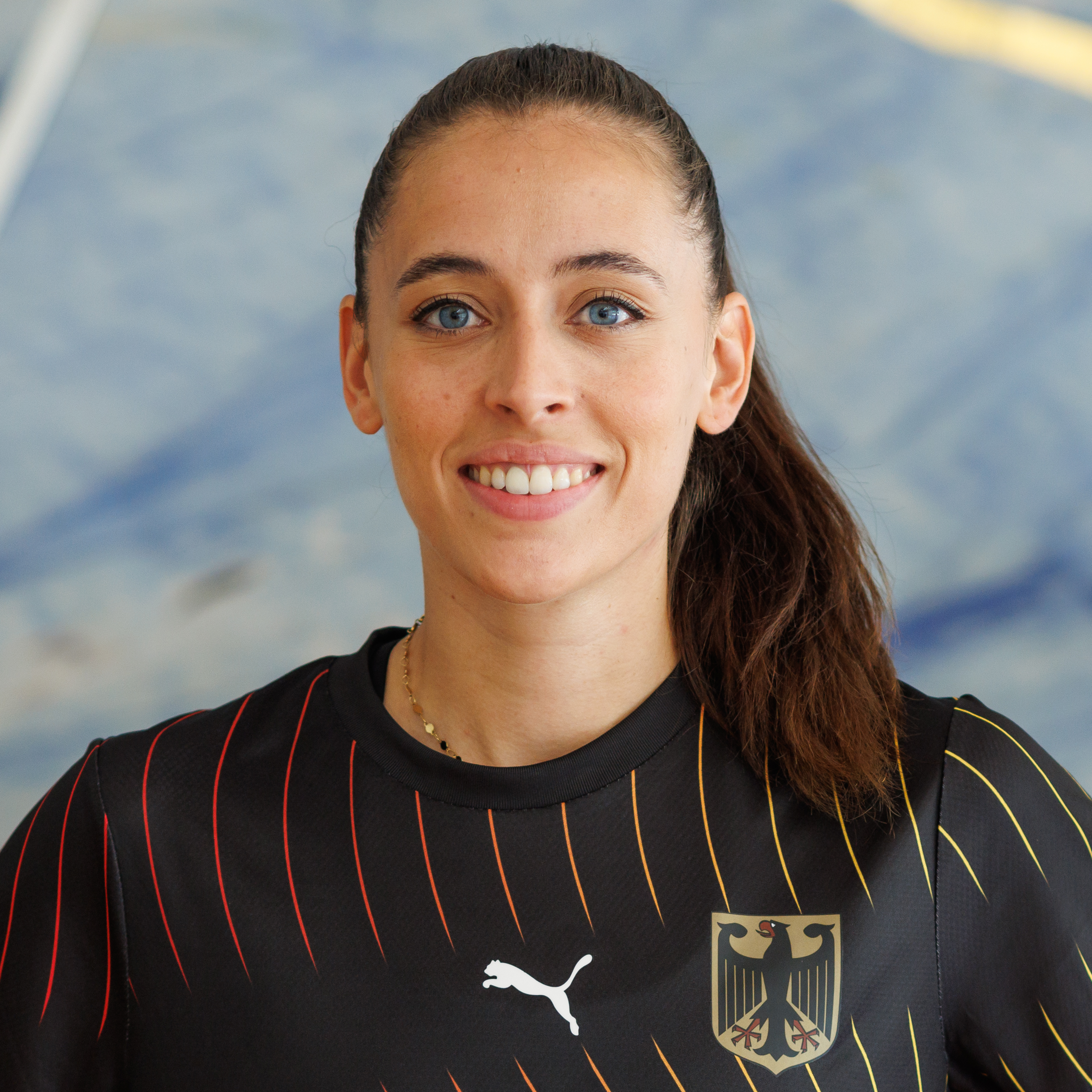
- Stockschläder in 2024

Personal information
- Full name: Johanna Maria Stockschläder
- Nationality: German
- Born: 11 February 1995 (age 31) Siegen, Germany
- Height: 1.71 m (5 ft 7 in)

Sport
- Sport: Handball
- Position: Left wing
- Current club: Neckarsulmer SU
- Number: 18

Senior clubs
- Years: Team
- 2011-2013: Bayer Leverkusen
- 2013-2017: HSG Bad Wildungen
- 2015-2016: SG 09 Kirchhof
- 2017-2021: Borussia Dortmund Handball
- 2021-: Neckarsulmer SU
National team
Years	Team	Apps	(Gls)
2021–	Germany	45	(124)
- Updated on 31. december 2023

Johanna Stockschläder (born 11 February 1995) is a German handballer who plays for Neckarsulmer SU in the Handball-Bundesliga Frauen and the Germany women's national team.

She made her debut on the Germany national team on 17 April 2021, against Portugal.

== Achievements ==
- Handball-Bundesliga Frauen:
  - Winner: 2021
