= Isabel Góis =

Portuguese handball player (born 1994)

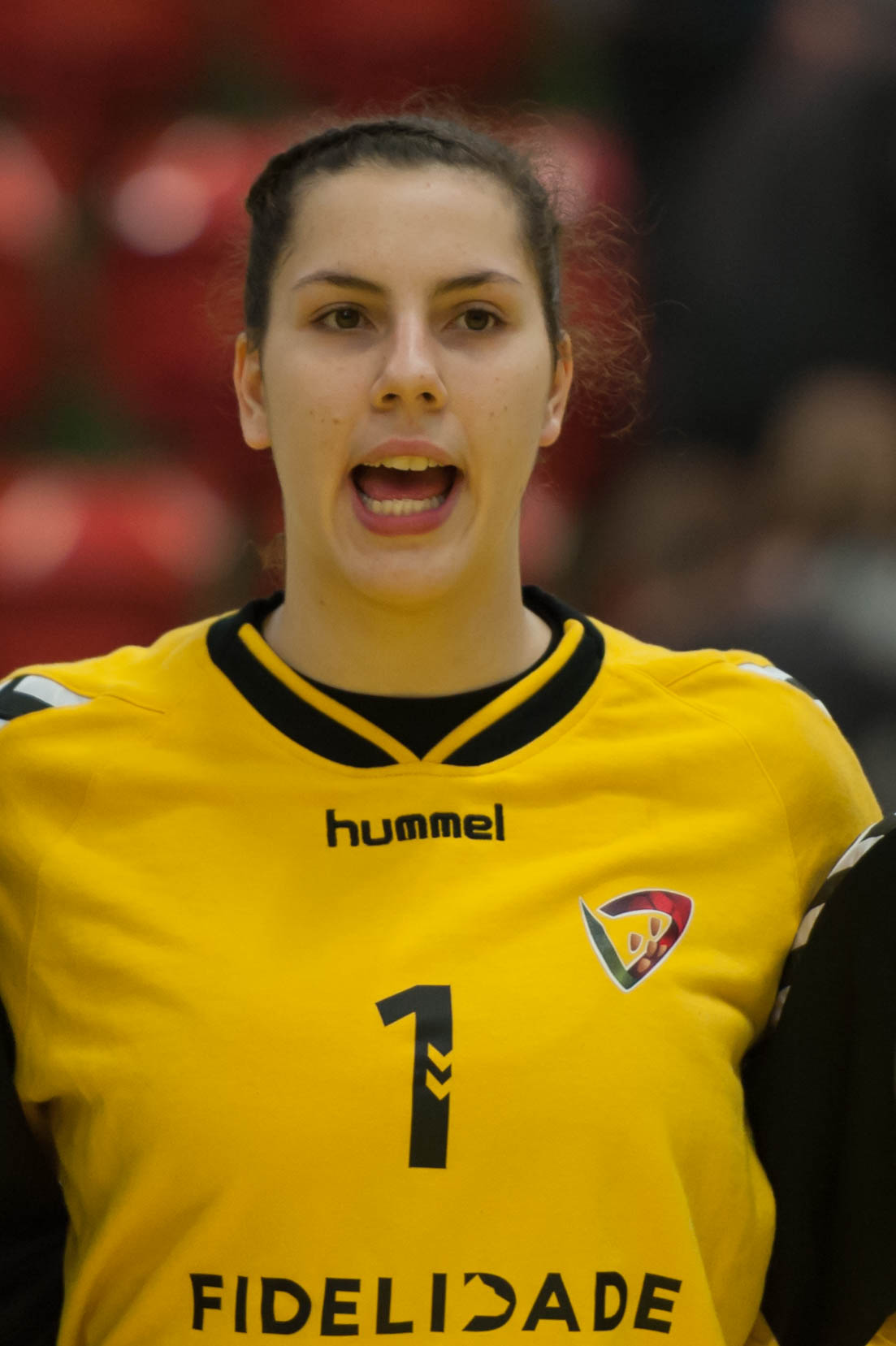

Personal information
- Full name: Isabel Figueira de Góis
- Nationality: Portuguese
- Born: 10 October 1995 (age 31) Valencia, Venezuela
- Height: 1.78 m (5 ft 10 in)

Sport
- Sport: Handball
- Position: Goalkeeper
- Current club: Madeira Andebol SAD
- Number: 1

Senior clubs
- Years: Team
- 2012–2014: Madeira Andebol SAD
- 2014–2017: AC Alavarium
- 2017–2018: Madeira Andebol SAD
- 2018–2020: SV Union Halle-Neustadt
- 2020–2022: Neckarsulmer SU
- 2022–: Madeira Andebol SAD
National team
Years	Team	Apps	(Gls)
2018–	Portugal	89	(0)

Isabel Góis (born 10 October 1995) is a Portuguese handball player for Madeira Andebol SAD and the Portuguese national team. In 2022, she returned to her former team Madeira Andebol SAD, after four years in Germany.

She represented Portugal at the 2024 European Women's Handball Championship.
