= Veronika Andrýsková =

Czech handball player (born 1997)

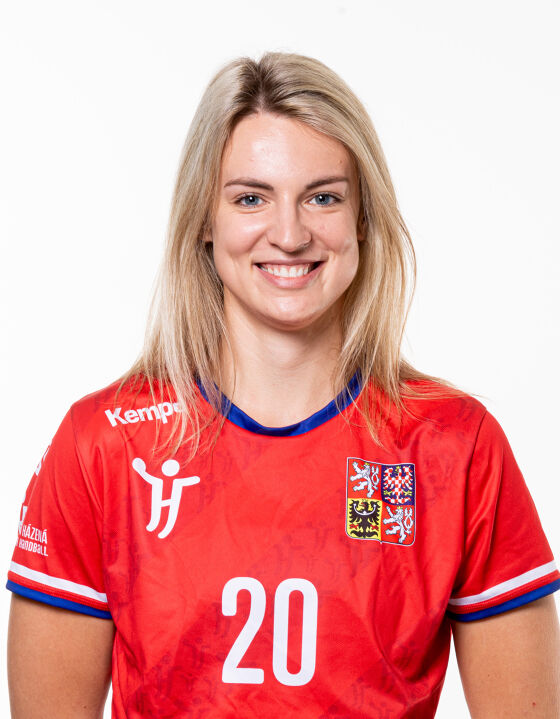

Personal information
- Nationality: Czech
- Born: 24 May 1997 (age 29) Uherské Hradiště, Czech Republic
- Height: 1.92 m (6 ft 4 in)

Sport
- Sport: Handball
- Position: Left back
- Current club: DHK Baník Most
- Number: 11
National team
Years	Team	Apps	(Gls)
2020–	Czech Republic	30	(26)
- Updated on 4 July 2024

Veronika Andrýsková (born 24 May 1997) is a Czech handballer for DHK Baník Most and the Czech national team.

She participated at the 2021 World Women's Handball Championship in Spain, placing 19th.

== Achievements ==
- Czech First Division:
  - Winner: 2021
