= TV Nellingen =

German women's handball team

- Full name: Turnverein Nellingen 1893 e.V.
- Short name: TV Nellingen
- Founded: 1893
- Arena: Sporthalle 1
- Capacity: 1,100
- President: Karl-Hans Schmid
- Head coach: Veronika Goldammer
- Captain: Tobias Schramek
- League: HBL
- 2023-2024: 11th (3. Liga)

Turnverein Nellingen 1893 e.V. is a German women's handball team from Ostfildern, Baden-Württemberg. They compete in the regionalliga, the third highest tier in German handball. They played Handball-Bundesliga Frauen, the top division in Germany, after being promoted in 2016. After the 2018-19 season Nellingen withdrew their Bundesliga team and was thus relegated to the third tier.

The club also organised badminton, basketball, soccer, track-and-field, swimming, skiing, taekwondo, volleyball, tennis, tabletennis and gymnastics. The club has 3,200 members.

== Notable players ==
- (Democratic Republic of the Congo) Simone Thiero
- (Germany) Sarah Wachter
- (Germany) Lena Degenhardt
- (Germany) Maren Weigel
