= Simone Thiero =

Congolese handball player

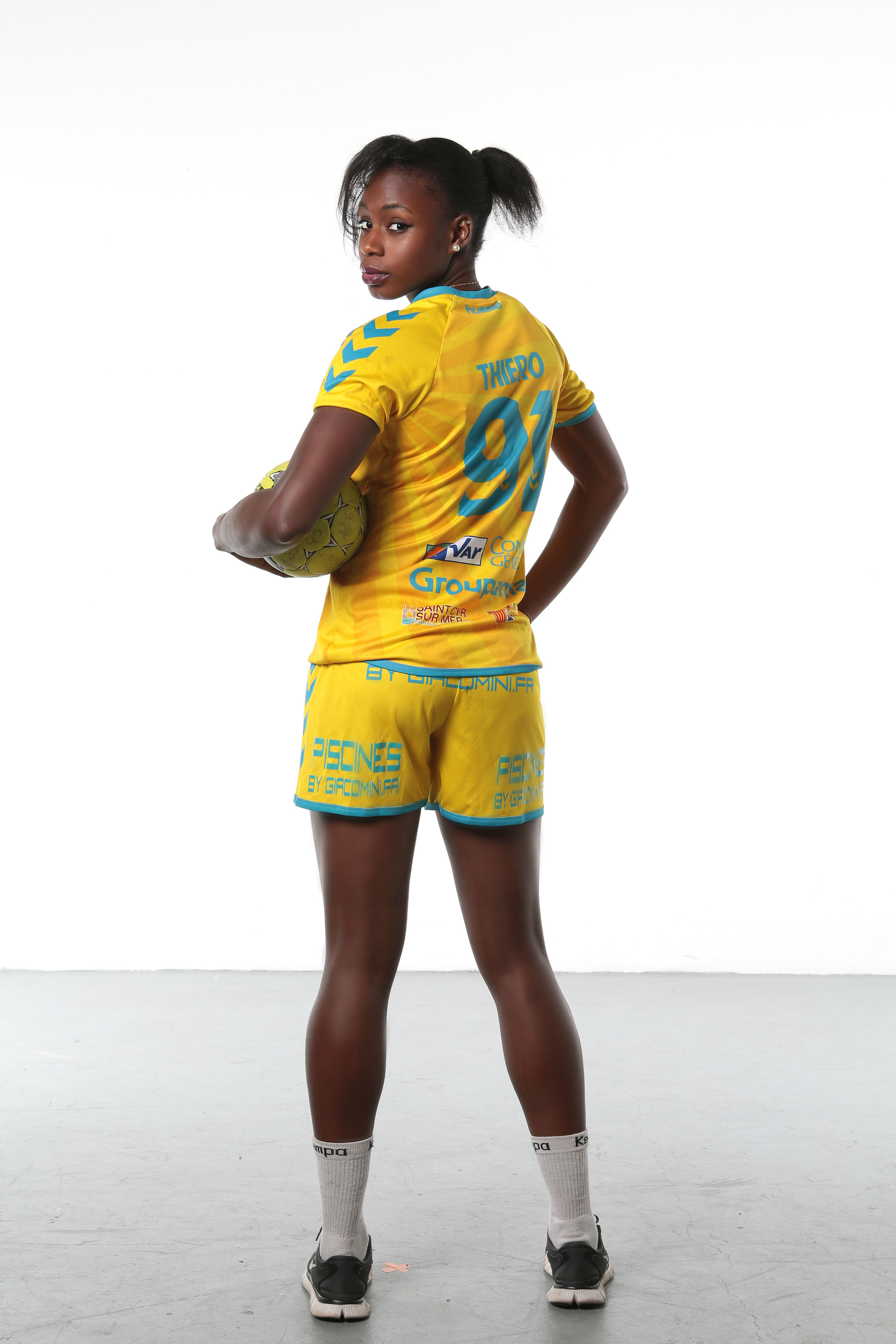

Personal information
- Nationality: French/Congolese
- Born: 15 March 1993 (age 33) Longjumeau, France
- Height: 1.76 m (5 ft 9 in)

Sport
- Sport: Handball
- Position: Right wing

Senior clubs
- Years: Team
- 2009-2011: Issy Paris Hand
- 2011-2014: Chambray Touraine Handball
- 2014-2016: Toulon Saint-Cyr VHB
- 2016-2017: TV Nellingen
National team
- Years: Team
- 2009: France U17
- 2015-?: DR Congo

Simone Thiero (born 15 March 1993) is a French-Congolese former handball player. She played for the DR Congo national team, where he competed at the 2015 World Women's Handball Championship in Denmark.

At club level she played for Issy Paris Hand, Chambray Touraine Handball and Toulon Saint-Cyr VHB in France and TV Nellingen in Germany.
