= Mia Møldrup =

Danish handball player (born 1991)

Personal information
- Full name: Mia Marie Tarp Møldrup
- Nationality: Danish
- Born: 6 April 1991 (age 35) Esbjerg, Denmark
- Height: 1.80 m (5 ft 11 in)

Sport
- Sport: Handball
- Position: Right Back

Senior clubs
- Years: Team
- -2008: Team Esbjerg
- 2008-2010: FC Midtjylland
- 2010-2012: FIF
- 2012-2015: Nykøbing Falster HK
- 2015-2017: Nantes Handball (France)
- 2017-2018: København Håndbold
- 2018-2020: MKS Lublin (Poland)
Medal record
IHF Youth World Championship
Bronze medal – third place	2008 Slovakia

Mia Marie Tarp Møldrup (born 6 April 1991) is a Danish former handball player.

She has played several matches for the Danish youth national teams and the Danish b-team.
