= Sarah Wachter =

German handball player (born 1999)

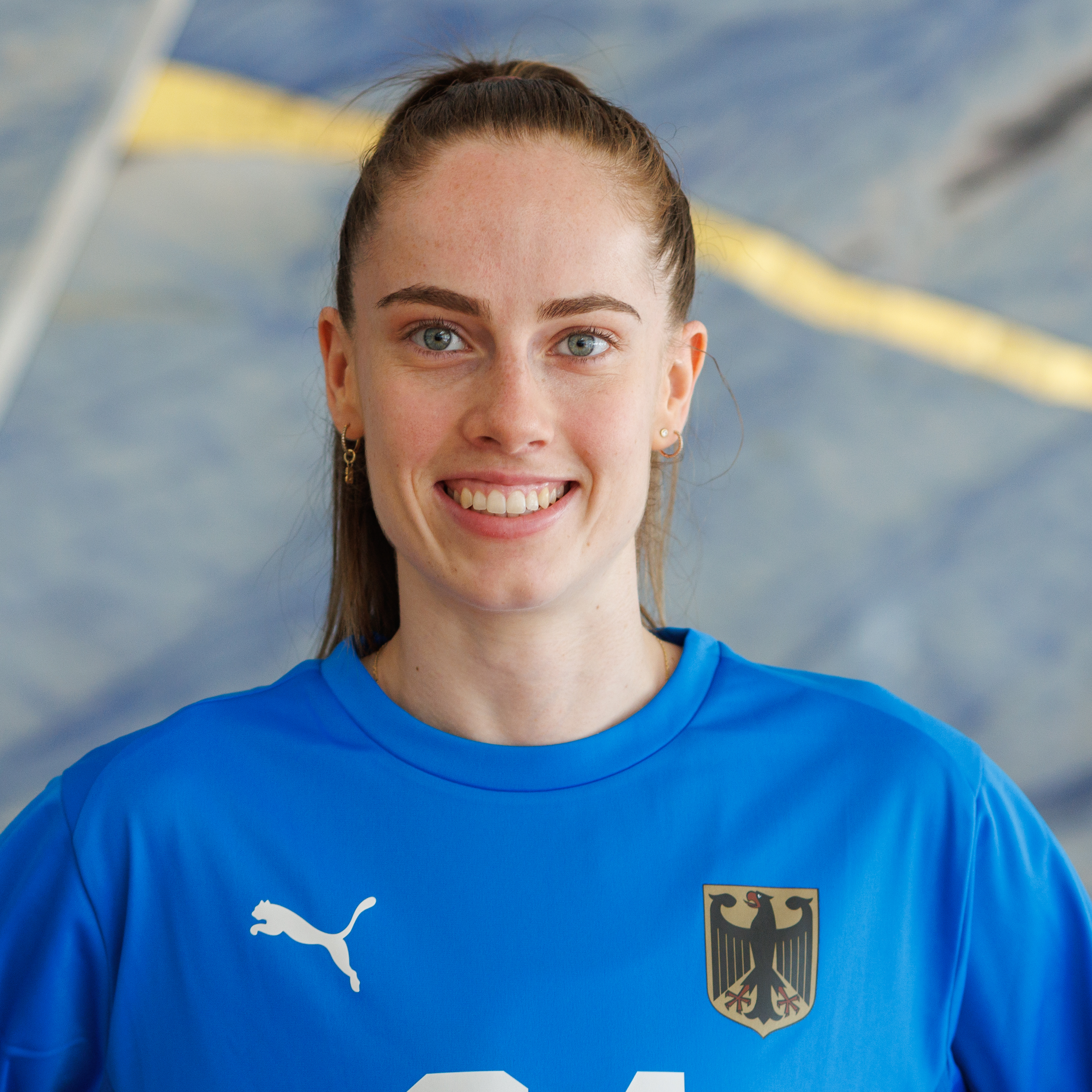

Personal information
- Full name: Sarah Victoria Wachter
- Nationality: German
- Born: 16 December 1999 (age 26)
- Height: 1.83 m (6 ft 0 in)

Sport
- Sport: Handball
- Position: Goalkeeper
- Current club: Borussia Dortmund
- Number: 12

Youth career
- Years: Team
- 2016-2017: TV Nellingen

Senior clubs
- Years: Team
- 2016-2017: SC Korb
- 2017-2019: TV Nellingen
- 2019-2023: Neckarsulmer SU
- 2023-: Borussia Dortmund
National team
Years	Team	Apps	(Gls)
2020-	Germany	48	(2)
Medal record
World Championship
Silver medal – second place	2025 Netherlands/Germany
- Updated on 7 November 2025

Sarah Wachter (born 16 December 1999) is a German handball player for Borussia Dortmund and the German national team.

She was selected as part of the German 35-player squad for the 2020 European Championship. She was also part of the German team for the 2025 World Championship. Here Germany reached the final, where they lost to Norway. This was the first time since 1994 that Germany made the final of a major international tournament and the first time they won a medal since 2007. Wachter acted primarily as a back-up to Katharina Filter.
