= Paulina Uścinowicz =

Polish handball player (born 1999)

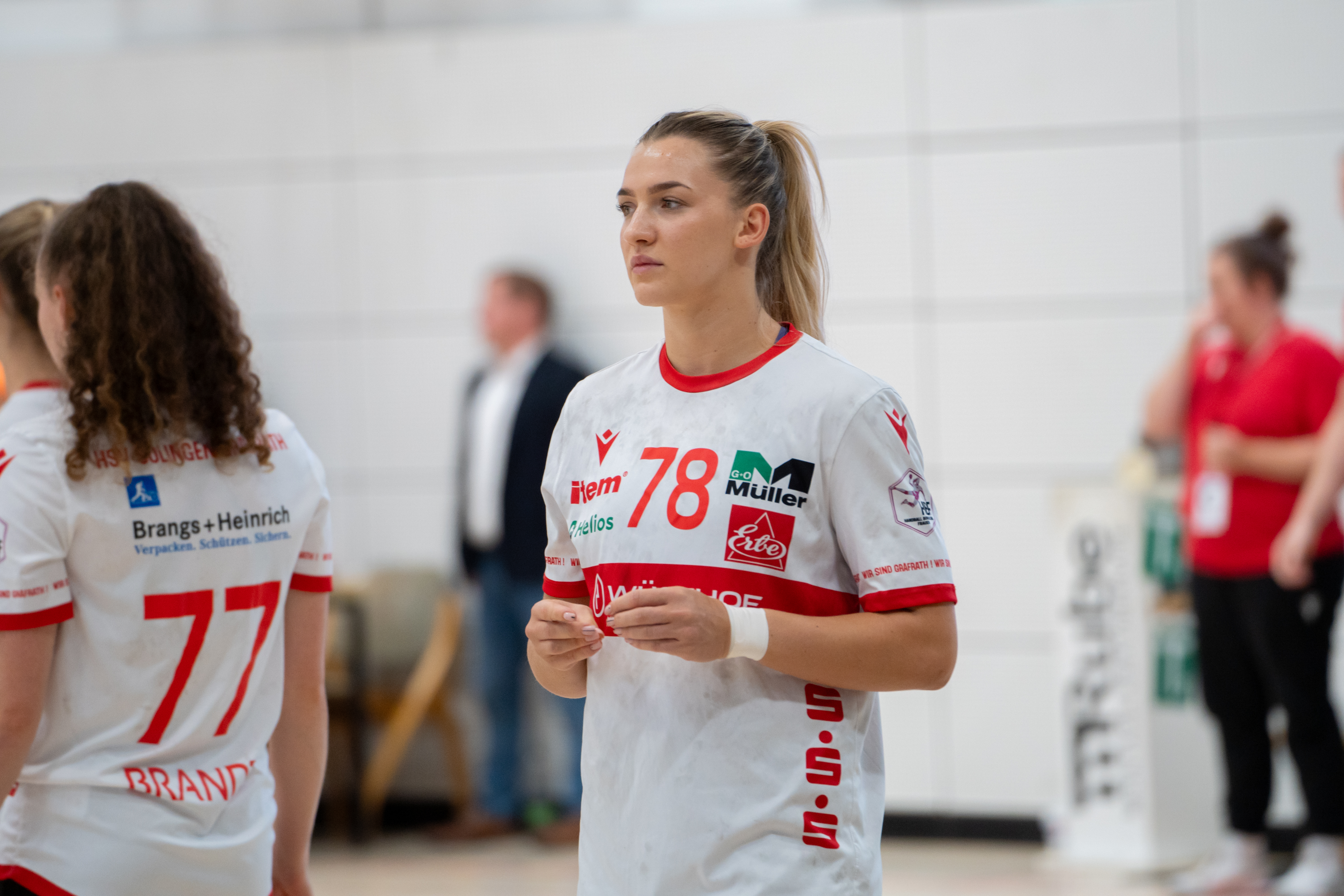

Personal information
- Nationality: Polish
- Born: 16 October 1999 (age 27) Gdańsk, Poland
- Height: 1.86 m (6 ft 1 in)

Sport
- Sport: Handball
- Position: Left back
- Current club: Fleury Loiret HB
- Number: 78

Senior clubs
- Years: Team
- 2017–2018: GTPR Gdynia
- 2018–2019: EB Start Elbląg
- 2019–2020: København Håndbold
- 2020–: Fleury Loiret HB
National team
Years	Team	Apps	(Gls)
2020–	Poland	1	(0)

Paulina Uścinowicz (born 16 October 1999) is a Polish handball player for Borussia Dortmund Handball and the Polish national team.

She represented Poland at the 2020 European Women's Handball Championship.
