= Neckarsulmer SU =

German sports club

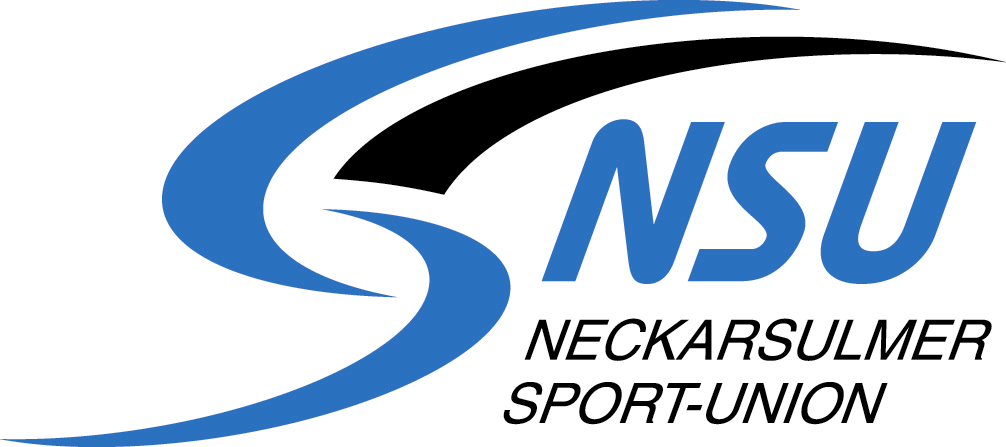
- Full name: Neckarsulmer Sport-Union e.V.
- Founded: 2009
- Ground: Pichterichstadion
- Chairman: Rolf Härdtner
- Head Coach: Marcel Busch (football)
- League: Verbandsliga Württemberg (VI)
- 2022–23: 17th (relegated)
Home colours

Neckarsulmer SU is a German sports club from the town of Neckarsulm, Baden-Württemberg. The football club's greatest success has been promotion to the tier five Oberliga Baden-Württemberg in 2016 and participation in the first round of the 2013–14 DFB-Pokal.

The club also has, among many others, a rugby union department, with the team playing in the 2. Rugby-Bundesliga since 2012.

The women's handball team played in the Bundesliga.

== Football ==
=== History ===
The origins of the club date back to 1908 when two football clubs were formed in Neckarsulm, Phoenix 08 and 1. FC Neckarsulm. Two years later the two clubs merged to form Sportverein Neckarsulm.

After years of playing in the lower amateur leagues of Württemberg the club won promotion to the tier three Amateurliga Württemberg in 1958. In 1960, the league was split into two regional divisions and Neckarsulm became part of the new Amateurliga Nordwürttemberg. It was relegated from this level again in 1961 but returned the following season. After three seasons as a lower table side the club was relegated again in 1965. Before that, in 1964, it won the Württemberg Cup for the first time, something the club repeated in 1969.

In the following decades, Neckarsulm returned to the lower amateur leagues, fluctuating between the Kreisliga, Bezirksliga and Landesliga. On 1 January 2009, Sportvereinigung Neckarsulm merged with Sportfreunde Neckarsulm to form the Neckarsulmer Sport-Union. In 2013, after a Landesliga title, the new club won promotion to the Verbandsliga Württemberg for the first time.

The club qualified for the first round of the 2013–14 DFB-Pokal, the German Cup, as the runners-up of the Württemberg Cup, taking up Dynamo Dresden's spot after the latter had been banned from the competition. Neckarsulm lost 7–0 to Kaiserslautern in the first round and was knocked out.

After three Verbandsliga seasons from 2013 to 2016 the club won the league in 2015–16 and won promotion to the tier five Oberliga Baden-Württemberg for the first time.

=== Honours ===
- Verbandsliga Württemberg
  - Champions: 2015–16
- Landesliga Württemberg I
  - Champions: 2012–13
- Bezirksliga Unterland
  - Champions: 2005–06, 2008–09
- Württemberg Cup
  - Winners: 1963–64, 1968–69

=== Recent seasons ===
The recent season-by-season performance of the club:

Season	Division	Tier	Position
2003–04	Kreisliga B Staffel I	VIII	3rd ↑
2004–05	Bezirksliga Unterland	VII	8th
2005–06	Bezirksliga Unterland	VII	1st ↑
2006–07	Landesliga Staffel I	VI	16th ↓
2007–08	Bezirksliga Unterland	VII	2nd
2008–09	Bezirksliga Unterland	VIII	1st ↑
2009–10	Landesliga Staffel I	VII	9th
2010–11	Landesliga Staffel I	VII	3rd
2011–12	Landesliga Staffel I	VII	4th
2012–13	Landesliga Staffel I	VII	1st ↑
2013–14	Verbandsliga Württemberg	VI	4th
2014–15	Verbandsliga Württemberg	VI	6th
2015–16	Verbandsliga Württemberg	VI	1st ↑
2016–17	Oberliga Baden-Württemberg	V	3rd
2017–18	Oberliga Baden-Württemberg	V	10th
2018–19	Oberliga Baden-Württemberg	V	10th
2019–20	Oberliga Baden-Württemberg	V	15th
2020–21	Oberliga Baden-Württemberg	V	7th
2021–22	Oberliga Baden-Württemberg	V	12th
2022–23	Oberliga Baden-Württemberg	V	17th ↓

- With the introduction of the 3. Liga in 2008 as the new third tier, below the 2. Bundesliga, all leagues below dropped one tier. results before 2009 are for the Sportvereinigung Neckarsulm.

↑ Promoted	↓ Relegated
