= 2012–13 EHF Women's Champions League group stage and main round =

This article describes the first and second round of the 2012–13 EHF Women's Champions League.

== Format ==
The 16 teams were split into four groups, consisting of four teams. Each team played a home and away game against all opponents in the group. The first two ranked teams advanced to the main round.

== Group matches ==
=== Seedings ===
The draw of the group matches was held on July 6 at the Gartenhotel Altmannsdorf in Vienna. A total of sixteen teams were concerned in the process, to be divided into four pots of four. Teams were divided into four pots, based on EHF coefficients. Clubs from the same pot or the same association could not be drawn into the same group, except the wild card tournament winner, which did not enjoy any protection.

Pot 1	Pot 2	Pot 3	Pot 4
(Hungary) Győri Audi ETO KC (Montenegro) Budućnost Podgorica (Norway) Larvik HK (Romania) CS Oltchim Rm. Vâlcea	(Denmark) Randers HK (Germany) Thüringer HC (Russia) Dinamo Volgograd (Slovenia) Krim Ljubljana	(Austria) Hypo Niederösterreich (Croatia) Podravka Koprivnica (Sweden) IK Sävehof (Russia) Zvezda Zvenigorod	(Denmark) Viborg HK (Germany) Buxtehuder SV (Romania) Universitatea Cluj (Hungary) FTC-Rail Cargo Hungaria

=== Group A ===
Team	Pld	W	D	L	GF	GA	GD	Pts
(Romania) CS Oltchim Rm. Vâlcea	6	6	0	0	170	129	+41	12
(Denmark) Randers HK	6	3	0	3	166	156	+10	6
(Austria) Hypo Niederösterreich	6	3	0	3	156	153	+3	6
(Germany) Buxtehuder SV	6	0	0	6	134	188	−54	0

14 October 2012; 19:00	CS Oltchim Rm. Vâlcea (Romania)	30 – 25	(Austria) Hypo Niederösterreich	Traian Sports Hall, Râmnicu Vâlcea; Attendance: 2,986; Referees: Santos, Fonseca (POR)
14 October 2012; 19:00	Bulatović 10	(15–12)	Aćimović 6	Traian Sports Hall, Râmnicu Vâlcea; Attendance: 2,986; Referees: Santos, Fonseca (POR)
14 October 2012; 19:00	3× (yellow card) 5× (suspension)	Report	3× (yellow card) 3× (suspension)	Traian Sports Hall, Râmnicu Vâlcea; Attendance: 2,986; Referees: Santos, Fonseca (POR)

15 October 2012; 19:00	Randers HK (Denmark)	36 – 26	(Germany) Buxtehuder SV	Elro Arena Randers, Randers; Attendance: 1,551; Referees: Kurtagic, Wetterwik (SWE)
15 October 2012; 19:00	Jacobsen 8	(20–10)	Fischer 7	Elro Arena Randers, Randers; Attendance: 1,551; Referees: Kurtagic, Wetterwik (SWE)
15 October 2012; 19:00	3× (yellow card) 4× (suspension)	Report	3× (yellow card) 3× (suspension)	Elro Arena Randers, Randers; Attendance: 1,551; Referees: Kurtagic, Wetterwik (SWE)

20 October 2012; 15:00	Buxtehuder SV (Germany)	15 – 34	(Romania) CS Oltchim Rm. Vâlcea	Alsterdorfer Sporthalle, Hamburg; Attendance: 1,300; Referees: Crnojević, Radič (CRO)
20 October 2012; 15:00	Fischer 6	(6–14)	Bulatović 7	Alsterdorfer Sporthalle, Hamburg; Attendance: 1,300; Referees: Crnojević, Radič (CRO)
20 October 2012; 15:00	2× (yellow card) 2× (suspension)	Report	2× (yellow card) 1× (suspension)	Alsterdorfer Sporthalle, Hamburg; Attendance: 1,300; Referees: Crnojević, Radič (CRO)

20 October 2012; 20:25	Hypo Niederösterreich (Austria)	32 – 25	(Denmark) Randers HK	Bundessport- und Freizeitzentrum Südstadt, Maria Enzersdorf; Attendance: 500; Referees: Kijauskaite, Zaliene (LTU)
20 October 2012; 20:25	three players 6	(18–11)	Dembélé 6	Bundessport- und Freizeitzentrum Südstadt, Maria Enzersdorf; Attendance: 500; Referees: Kijauskaite, Zaliene (LTU)
20 October 2012; 20:25	3× (yellow card)	Report	2× (yellow card) 1× (red card)	Bundessport- und Freizeitzentrum Südstadt, Maria Enzersdorf; Attendance: 500; Referees: Kijauskaite, Zaliene (LTU)

27 October 2012; 15:00	Randers HK (Denmark)	20 – 24	(Romania) CS Oltchim Rm. Vâlcea	Elro Arena Randers, Randers; Attendance: 1,450; Referees: Gubica, Milošević (CRO)
27 October 2012; 15:00	Andersen 5	(9–11)	Curea 6	Elro Arena Randers, Randers; Attendance: 1,450; Referees: Gubica, Milošević (CRO)
27 October 2012; 15:00	3× (yellow card) 3× (suspension)	Report	2× (yellow card) 3× (suspension)	Elro Arena Randers, Randers; Attendance: 1,450; Referees: Gubica, Milošević (CRO)

28 October 2012; 15:00	Buxtehuder SV (Germany)	20 – 28	(Austria) Hypo Niederösterreich	Alsterdorfer Sporthalle, Hamburg; Attendance: 1,200; Referees: Andorka, Hucker (HUN)
28 October 2012; 15:00	Fischer 6	(8–11)	Diniz 8	Alsterdorfer Sporthalle, Hamburg; Attendance: 1,200; Referees: Andorka, Hucker (HUN)
28 October 2012; 15:00	2× (yellow card) 3× (suspension)	Report	2× (yellow card) 4× (suspension)	Alsterdorfer Sporthalle, Hamburg; Attendance: 1,200; Referees: Andorka, Hucker (HUN)

3 November 2012; 20:25	Hypo Niederösterreich (Austria)	27 – 24	(Germany) Buxtehuder SV	Bundessport- und Freizeitzentrum Südstadt, Maria Enzersdorf; Attendance: 800; Referees: Nabokau, Kulik (BLR)
3 November 2012; 20:25	do Nascimento 8	(14–11)	Lütz 6	Bundessport- und Freizeitzentrum Südstadt, Maria Enzersdorf; Attendance: 800; Referees: Nabokau, Kulik (BLR)
3 November 2012; 20:25	2× (yellow card) 3× (suspension)	Report	3× (yellow card) 1× (suspension)	Bundessport- und Freizeitzentrum Südstadt, Maria Enzersdorf; Attendance: 800; Referees: Nabokau, Kulik (BLR)

4 November 2012; 19:00	CS Oltchim Rm. Vâlcea (Romania)	27 – 23	(Denmark) Randers HK	Traian Sports Hall, Râmnicu Vâlcea; Attendance: 2,788; Referees: Krstić, Ljubić (SLO)
4 November 2012; 19:00	Brădeanu 7	(10–10)	Aguilar 6	Traian Sports Hall, Râmnicu Vâlcea; Attendance: 2,788; Referees: Krstić, Ljubić (SLO)
4 November 2012; 19:00	3× (yellow card) 1× (suspension)	Report	3× (yellow card) 1× (suspension)	Traian Sports Hall, Râmnicu Vâlcea; Attendance: 2,788; Referees: Krstić, Ljubić (SLO)

11 November 2012; 15:00	Buxtehuder SV (Germany)	27 – 33	(Denmark) Randers HK	Alsterdorfer Sporthalle, Hamburg; Attendance: 1,500; Referees: Leandersson, Lindroos (FIN)
11 November 2012; 15:00	Stapelfeldt 7	(11–16)	Andersen 7	Alsterdorfer Sporthalle, Hamburg; Attendance: 1,500; Referees: Leandersson, Lindroos (FIN)
11 November 2012; 15:00	2× (yellow card) 3× (suspension)	Report	3× (yellow card) 2× (suspension)	Alsterdorfer Sporthalle, Hamburg; Attendance: 1,500; Referees: Leandersson, Lindroos (FIN)

11 November 2012; 17:00	Hypo Niederösterreich (Austria)	24 – 25	(Romania) CS Oltchim Rm. Vâlcea	Bundessport- und Freizeitzentrum Südstadt, Maria Enzersdorf; Attendance: 1,020; Referees: Marić, Mašić (CRO)
11 November 2012; 17:00	Cavaleiro 8	(12–14)	Bulatović 10	Bundessport- und Freizeitzentrum Südstadt, Maria Enzersdorf; Attendance: 1,020; Referees: Marić, Mašić (CRO)
11 November 2012; 17:00	3× (yellow card) 4× (suspension)	Report	3× (yellow card) 5× (suspension)	Bundessport- und Freizeitzentrum Südstadt, Maria Enzersdorf; Attendance: 1,020; Referees: Marić, Mašić (CRO)

18 November 2012; 15:00	Randers HK (Denmark)	29 – 20	(Austria) Hypo Niederösterreich	Elro Arena Randers, Randers; Attendance: 1,700; Referees: Dobrovits, Tájok (HUN)
18 November 2012; 15:00	Dalby 8	(15–9)	Diniz 5	Elro Arena Randers, Randers; Attendance: 1,700; Referees: Dobrovits, Tájok (HUN)
18 November 2012; 15:00	1× (yellow card) 5× (suspension) 1× (red card)	Report	2× (yellow card) 3× (suspension)	Elro Arena Randers, Randers; Attendance: 1,700; Referees: Dobrovits, Tájok (HUN)

18 November 2012; 19:00	CS Oltchim Rm. Vâlcea (Romania)	30 – 22	(Germany) Buxtehuder SV	Traian Sports Hall, Râmnicu Vâlcea; Attendance: 1,846; Referees: Mazeika, Gatelis (LTU)
18 November 2012; 19:00	Bulatović 6	(18–10)	Stapelfeldt 6	Traian Sports Hall, Râmnicu Vâlcea; Attendance: 1,846; Referees: Mazeika, Gatelis (LTU)
18 November 2012; 19:00	3× (yellow card) 5× (suspension)	Report	2× (yellow card) 3× (suspension)	Traian Sports Hall, Râmnicu Vâlcea; Attendance: 1,846; Referees: Mazeika, Gatelis (LTU)

=== Group B ===
Team	Pld	W	D	L	GF	GA	GD	Pts
(Hungary) Győri Audi ETO KC	6	6	0	0	180	134	+46	12
(Slovenia) Krim Ljubljana	6	3	0	3	151	157	−6	6
(Croatia) Podravka Koprivnica	6	3	0	3	136	143	−7	6
(Romania) Universitatea Cluj	6	0	0	6	141	174	−33	0

13 October 2012; 17:15	Győri Audi ETO KC (Hungary)	24 – 19	(Croatia) Podravka Koprivnica	Magvassy Mihály Sportcsarnok, Győr; Attendance: 2,000; Referees: Gousko, Repkin (BLR)
13 October 2012; 17:15	Amorim 5	(11–7)	Damnjanović 9	Magvassy Mihály Sportcsarnok, Győr; Attendance: 2,000; Referees: Gousko, Repkin (BLR)
13 October 2012; 17:15	2× (yellow card) 1× (suspension)	Report	3× (yellow card) 6× (suspension)	Magvassy Mihály Sportcsarnok, Győr; Attendance: 2,000; Referees: Gousko, Repkin (BLR)

14 October 2012; 19:30	Krim Ljubljana (Slovenia)	28 – 27	(Romania) Universitatea Cluj	Arena Stožice, Ljubljana; Attendance: 2,500; Referees: Leszczyński, Piechota (POL)
14 October 2012; 19:30	Müller 9	(15–13)	Ani Senocico 8	Arena Stožice, Ljubljana; Attendance: 2,500; Referees: Leszczyński, Piechota (POL)
14 October 2012; 19:30	3× (yellow card) 4× (suspension)	Report	3× (yellow card) 2× (suspension)	Arena Stožice, Ljubljana; Attendance: 2,500; Referees: Leszczyński, Piechota (POL)

20 October 2012; 17:30	Universitatea Cluj (Romania)	25 – 30	(Hungary) Győri Audi ETO KC	Horia Demian Sports Hall, Cluj-Napoca; Attendance: 3,000; Referees: Bonaventura, Bonaventura (FRA)
20 October 2012; 17:30	Ani Senocico 7	(13–20)	Lekić, Løke 8	Horia Demian Sports Hall, Cluj-Napoca; Attendance: 3,000; Referees: Bonaventura, Bonaventura (FRA)
20 October 2012; 17:30	3× (yellow card) 4× (suspension)	Report	2× (yellow card) 1× (suspension)	Horia Demian Sports Hall, Cluj-Napoca; Attendance: 3,000; Referees: Bonaventura, Bonaventura (FRA)

21 October 2012; 17:30	Podravka Koprivnica (Croatia)	25 – 22	(Slovenia) Krim Ljubljana	Fran Galović, Koprivnica; Attendance: 2,500; Referees: Fleisch, Rieber (GER)
21 October 2012; 17:30	Čović 8	(14–11)	Martín 8	Fran Galović, Koprivnica; Attendance: 2,500; Referees: Fleisch, Rieber (GER)
21 October 2012; 17:30	3× (yellow card) 2× (suspension)	Report	3× (yellow card) 4× (suspension)	Fran Galović, Koprivnica; Attendance: 2,500; Referees: Fleisch, Rieber (GER)

27 October 2012; 17:30	Universitatea Cluj (Romania)	19 – 20	(Croatia) Podravka Koprivnica	Horia Demian Sports Hall, Cluj-Napoca; Attendance: 2,500; Referees: Kleven, Ramberg (NOR)
27 October 2012; 17:30	Cartaș 5	(6–10)	Damnjanović 6	Horia Demian Sports Hall, Cluj-Napoca; Attendance: 2,500; Referees: Kleven, Ramberg (NOR)
27 October 2012; 17:30	2× (yellow card) 1× (suspension)	Report	3× (yellow card) 2× (suspension)	Horia Demian Sports Hall, Cluj-Napoca; Attendance: 2,500; Referees: Kleven, Ramberg (NOR)

28 October 2012; 19:30	Krim Ljubljana (Slovenia)	20 – 31	(Hungary) Győri Audi ETO KC	Arena Stožice, Ljubljana; Attendance: 2,500; Referees: Opava, Válek (CZE)
28 October 2012; 19:30	Wörz, Zrnec 4	(9–12)	Görbicz 8	Arena Stožice, Ljubljana; Attendance: 2,500; Referees: Opava, Válek (CZE)
28 October 2012; 19:30	3× (yellow card) 2× (suspension)	Report	3× (yellow card) 2× (suspension)	Arena Stožice, Ljubljana; Attendance: 2,500; Referees: Opava, Válek (CZE)

3 November 2012; 15:45	Győri Audi ETO KC (Hungary)	29 – 22	(Slovenia) Krim Ljubljana	Magvassy Mihály Sportcsarnok, Győr; Attendance: 1,800; Referees: Kijauskaite, Zaliene (LTU)
3 November 2012; 15:45	Radičević 7	(16–9)	Mavsar 6	Magvassy Mihály Sportcsarnok, Győr; Attendance: 1,800; Referees: Kijauskaite, Zaliene (LTU)
3 November 2012; 15:45	3× (yellow card) 2× (suspension)	Report	3× (yellow card) 4× (suspension)	Magvassy Mihály Sportcsarnok, Győr; Attendance: 1,800; Referees: Kijauskaite, Zaliene (LTU)

4 November 2012; 17:30	Podravka Koprivnica (Croatia)	28 – 21	(Romania) Universitatea Cluj	Fran Galović, Koprivnica; Attendance: 2,500; Referees: Lythje, Christiansen (DEN)
4 November 2012; 17:30	Damnjanović 11	(16–13)	Tivadar 6	Fran Galović, Koprivnica; Attendance: 2,500; Referees: Lythje, Christiansen (DEN)
4 November 2012; 17:30	3× (yellow card) 3× (suspension)	Report	3× (yellow card) 3× (suspension)	Fran Galović, Koprivnica; Attendance: 2,500; Referees: Lythje, Christiansen (DEN)

11 November 2012; 16:30	Universitatea Cluj (Romania)	23 – 31	(Slovenia) Krim Ljubljana	Horia Demian Sports Hall, Cluj-Napoca; Attendance: 2,700; Referees: Kurtagic, Wetterwik (SWE)
11 November 2012; 16:30	Ani Senocico 5	(12–15)	Mavsar 6	Horia Demian Sports Hall, Cluj-Napoca; Attendance: 2,700; Referees: Kurtagic, Wetterwik (SWE)
11 November 2012; 16:30	3× (yellow card) 2× (suspension)	Report	3× (yellow card) 5× (suspension)	Horia Demian Sports Hall, Cluj-Napoca; Attendance: 2,700; Referees: Kurtagic, Wetterwik (SWE)

11 November 2012; 17:30	Podravka Koprivnica (Croatia)	22 – 29	(Hungary) Győri Audi ETO KC	Fran Galović, Koprivnica; Attendance: 2,500; Referees: Schulze, Tönnies (GER)
11 November 2012; 17:30	Damnjanović 8	(11–14)	Lekić 7	Fran Galović, Koprivnica; Attendance: 2,500; Referees: Schulze, Tönnies (GER)
11 November 2012; 17:30	3× (yellow card) 2× (suspension)	Report	3× (yellow card) 4× (suspension)	Fran Galović, Koprivnica; Attendance: 2,500; Referees: Schulze, Tönnies (GER)

17 November 2012; 16:00	Győri Audi ETO KC (Hungary)	37 – 26	(Romania) Universitatea Cluj	Magvassy Mihály Sportcsarnok, Győr; Attendance: 1,800; Referees: Rakytina, Tkachuk (UKR)
17 November 2012; 16:00	Szepesi 7	(17–14)	Chintoan 9	Magvassy Mihály Sportcsarnok, Győr; Attendance: 1,800; Referees: Rakytina, Tkachuk (UKR)
17 November 2012; 16:00	3× (yellow card) 4× (suspension)	Report	1× (yellow card) 5× (suspension) 1× (red card)	Magvassy Mihály Sportcsarnok, Győr; Attendance: 1,800; Referees: Rakytina, Tkachuk (UKR)

18 November 2012; 20:30	Krim Ljubljana (Slovenia)	28 – 22	(Croatia) Podravka Koprivnica	Arena Stožice, Ljubljana; Attendance: 3,000; Referees: Lorente, Serradilla (ESP)
18 November 2012; 20:30	Martín, Müller 6	(14–12)	Damnjanović 8	Arena Stožice, Ljubljana; Attendance: 3,000; Referees: Lorente, Serradilla (ESP)
18 November 2012; 20:30	3× (yellow card) 6× (suspension) 1× (red card)	Report	3× (yellow card) 3× (suspension)	Arena Stožice, Ljubljana; Attendance: 3,000; Referees: Lorente, Serradilla (ESP)

=== Group C ===
Team	Pld	W	D	L	GF	GA	GD	Pts
(Norway) Larvik HK	6	5	0	1	197	156	+41	10
(Hungary) FTC-Rail Cargo Hungaria	6	5	0	1	183	163	+20	10
(Russia) Dinamo Volgograd	6	1	0	5	157	200	−43	2
(Sweden) IK Sävehof	6	1	0	5	174	192	−18	2

13 October 2012; 17:45	Larvik HK (Norway)	39 – 31	(Sweden) IK Sävehof	Arena Larvik, Larvik; Attendance: 1,450; Referees: Marić, Mašić (SRB)
13 October 2012; 17:45	Sulland 10	(21–13)	Odén 8	Arena Larvik, Larvik; Attendance: 1,450; Referees: Marić, Mašić (SRB)
13 October 2012; 17:45	3× (yellow card) 2× (suspension)	Report	3× (yellow card) 1× (suspension)	Arena Larvik, Larvik; Attendance: 1,450; Referees: Marić, Mašić (SRB)

14 October 2012; 16:00	Dinamo Volgograd (Russia)	21 – 37	(Hungary) FTC-Rail Cargo Hungaria	Dynamo Sports Hall, Volgograd; Attendance: 1,200; Referees: Florescu, Duţă (ROU)
14 October 2012; 16:00	Khmyrova 6	(9–23)	Tomori 8	Dynamo Sports Hall, Volgograd; Attendance: 1,200; Referees: Florescu, Duţă (ROU)
14 October 2012; 16:00	3× (yellow card) 5× (suspension)	Report	3× (yellow card) 4× (suspension)	Dynamo Sports Hall, Volgograd; Attendance: 1,200; Referees: Florescu, Duţă (ROU)

21 October 2012; 16:00	IK Sävehof (Sweden)	28 – 34	(Russia) Dinamo Volgograd	Partillebohallen, Sävehof; Attendance: 1,150; Referees: Brehmer, Skowronek (POL)
21 October 2012; 16:00	Odén 7	(10–16)	Khmyrova 7	Partillebohallen, Sävehof; Attendance: 1,150; Referees: Brehmer, Skowronek (POL)
21 October 2012; 16:00	2× (yellow card) 1× (suspension)	Report	2× (yellow card) 1× (suspension)	Partillebohallen, Sävehof; Attendance: 1,150; Referees: Brehmer, Skowronek (POL)

21 October 2012; 18:00	FTC-Rail Cargo Hungaria (Hungary)	28 – 24	(Norway) Larvik HK	OBO Aréna, Dabas; Attendance: 2,498; Referees: Stolarovs, Līcis (LAT)
21 October 2012; 18:00	Tomori, Zácsik 5	(16–12)	Edin 7	OBO Aréna, Dabas; Attendance: 2,498; Referees: Stolarovs, Līcis (LAT)
21 October 2012; 18:00	2× (yellow card) 1× (suspension)	Report	3× (yellow card) 4× (suspension)	OBO Aréna, Dabas; Attendance: 2,498; Referees: Stolarovs, Līcis (LAT)

27 October 2012; 19:00	FTC-Rail Cargo Hungaria (Hungary)	31 – 28	(Sweden) IK Sävehof	OBO Aréna, Dabas; Attendance: 2,498; Referees: Santos, Fonseca (POR)
27 October 2012; 19:00	Szucsanszki 9	(15–16)	Roberts 9	OBO Aréna, Dabas; Attendance: 2,498; Referees: Santos, Fonseca (POR)
27 October 2012; 19:00	2× (yellow card) 4× (suspension)	Report	4× (yellow card) 4× (suspension)	OBO Aréna, Dabas; Attendance: 2,498; Referees: Santos, Fonseca (POR)

28 October 2012; 16:00	Dinamo Volgograd (Russia)	24 – 35	(Norway) Larvik HK	Dynamo Sports Hall, Volgograd; Attendance: 1,200; Referees: Horáček, Novotný (CZE)
28 October 2012; 16:00	Grebenkina, Stepanova 3	(14–17)	Edin 8	Dynamo Sports Hall, Volgograd; Attendance: 1,200; Referees: Horáček, Novotný (CZE)
28 October 2012; 16:00	3× (yellow card) 3× (suspension)	Report	3× (yellow card) 2× (suspension)	Dynamo Sports Hall, Volgograd; Attendance: 1,200; Referees: Horáček, Novotný (CZE)

3 November 2012; 17:45	Larvik HK (Norway)	40 – 25	(Russia) Dinamo Volgograd	Arena Larvik, Larvik; Attendance: 1,847; Referees: Jurinović, Mrvica (CRO)
3 November 2012; 17:45	Edin 9	(20–11)	Makeeva 5	Arena Larvik, Larvik; Attendance: 1,847; Referees: Jurinović, Mrvica (CRO)
3 November 2012; 17:45	2× (yellow card) 4× (suspension)	Report	3× (yellow card) 5× (suspension)	Arena Larvik, Larvik; Attendance: 1,847; Referees: Jurinović, Mrvica (CRO)

4 November 2012; 15:00	IK Sävehof (Sweden)	32 – 34	(Hungary) FTC-Rail Cargo Hungaria	Partillebohallen, Sävehof; Attendance: 768; Referees: Florescu, Duţă (ROU)
4 November 2012; 15:00	Odén 7	(15–13)	Szucsánszki 12	Partillebohallen, Sävehof; Attendance: 768; Referees: Florescu, Duţă (ROU)
4 November 2012; 15:00	3× (yellow card) 3× (suspension)	Report	3× (yellow card) 5× (suspension)	Partillebohallen, Sävehof; Attendance: 768; Referees: Florescu, Duţă (ROU)

11 November 2012; 15:00	IK Sävehof (Sweden)	25 – 29	(Norway) Larvik HK	Partillebohallen, Sävehof; Attendance: 1,066; Referees: Olesen, Pedersen (DEN)
11 November 2012; 15:00	Roberts 8	(13–11)	Sulland 6	Partillebohallen, Sävehof; Attendance: 1,066; Referees: Olesen, Pedersen (DEN)
11 November 2012; 15:00	2× (yellow card) 3× (suspension)	Report	3× (yellow card) 3× (suspension)	Partillebohallen, Sävehof; Attendance: 1,066; Referees: Olesen, Pedersen (DEN)

11 November 2012; 19:00	FTC-Rail Cargo Hungaria (Hungary)	30 – 28	(Russia) Dinamo Volgograd	OBO Aréna, Dabas; Attendance: 2,002; Referees: Vešović, Mitrović (MNE)
11 November 2012; 19:00	Szucsanszki, Tomori 9	(14–17)	Khmyrova 6	OBO Aréna, Dabas; Attendance: 2,002; Referees: Vešović, Mitrović (MNE)
11 November 2012; 19:00	3× (yellow card) 1× (suspension)	Report	3× (yellow card) 6× (suspension)	OBO Aréna, Dabas; Attendance: 2,002; Referees: Vešović, Mitrović (MNE)

17 November 2012; 17:45	Larvik HK (Norway)	30 – 23	(Hungary) FTC-Rail Cargo Hungaria	Arena Larvik, Larvik; Attendance: 2,890; Referees: Nabokau, Kulik (BLR)
17 November 2012; 17:45	Mörk 6	(16–13)	Szamoránsky 6	Arena Larvik, Larvik; Attendance: 2,890; Referees: Nabokau, Kulik (BLR)
17 November 2012; 17:45	3× (yellow card) 5× (suspension) 1× (red card)	Report	3× (yellow card) 5× (suspension) 1× (red card)	Arena Larvik, Larvik; Attendance: 2,890; Referees: Nabokau, Kulik (BLR)

18 November 2012; 16:00	Dinamo Volgograd (Russia)	25 – 30	(Sweden) IK Sävehof	Dynamo Sports Hall, Volgograd; Attendance: 1,200; Referees: Brunovský, Čanda (SVK)
18 November 2012; 16:00	Borshchenko 6	(12–13)	Odén 9	Dynamo Sports Hall, Volgograd; Attendance: 1,200; Referees: Brunovský, Čanda (SVK)
18 November 2012; 16:00	3× (yellow card) 5× (suspension)	Report	3× (yellow card) 4× (suspension)	Dynamo Sports Hall, Volgograd; Attendance: 1,200; Referees: Brunovský, Čanda (SVK)

=== Group D ===
Team	Pld	W	D	L	GF	GA	GD	Pts
(Russia) Zvezda Zvenigorod	6	5	0	1	154	142	+12	10
(Montenegro) Budućnost Podgorica	6	4	0	2	149	134	+15	8
(Germany) Thüringer HC	6	3	0	3	146	153	−7	6
(Denmark) Viborg HK	6	0	0	6	143	163	−20	0

13 October 2012; 20:00	Budućnost Podgorica (Montenegro)	29 – 21	(Russia) Zvezda Zvenigorod	Morača Sports Center, Podgorica; Attendance: 3,500; Referees: Opava, Válek (CZE)
13 October 2012; 20:00	Knežević 11	(15–9)	Nikolić 7	Morača Sports Center, Podgorica; Attendance: 3,500; Referees: Opava, Válek (CZE)
13 October 2012; 20:00	3× (yellow card) 6× (suspension)	Report	3× (yellow card) 2× (suspension)	Morača Sports Center, Podgorica; Attendance: 3,500; Referees: Opava, Válek (CZE)

14 October 2012; 15:00	Thüringer HC (Germany)	34 – 30	(Denmark) Viborg HK	Salza-Halle, Bad Langensalza; Attendance: 1,750; Referees: Jurinović, Mrvica (CRO)
14 October 2012; 15:00	Jakubisová 6	(18–14)	Gulldén 8	Salza-Halle, Bad Langensalza; Attendance: 1,750; Referees: Jurinović, Mrvica (CRO)
14 October 2012; 15:00	3× (yellow card) 4× (suspension)	Report	3× (yellow card) 4× (suspension)	Salza-Halle, Bad Langensalza; Attendance: 1,750; Referees: Jurinović, Mrvica (CRO)

20 October 2012; 17:00	Zvezda Zvenigorod (Russia)	31 – 24	(Germany) Thüringer HC	Sport Hall "Olimpiyskiy", Chekhov; Attendance: 800; Referees: Stark, Stefan (ROU)
20 October 2012; 17:00	Vyakhireva 10	(15–13)	Nadgornaja 9	Sport Hall "Olimpiyskiy", Chekhov; Attendance: 800; Referees: Stark, Stefan (ROU)
20 October 2012; 17:00	3× (yellow card) 3× (suspension)	Report	3× (yellow card) 1× (suspension)	Sport Hall "Olimpiyskiy", Chekhov; Attendance: 800; Referees: Stark, Stefan (ROU)

21 October 2012; 17:00	Viborg HK (Denmark)	20 – 26	(Montenegro) Budućnost Podgorica	Viborg Stadionhal, Viborg; Attendance: 1,420; Referees: Bonifert, Oláh (HUN)
21 October 2012; 17:00	Gulldén, Pedersen 5	(12–14)	Knežević 8	Viborg Stadionhal, Viborg; Attendance: 1,420; Referees: Bonifert, Oláh (HUN)
21 October 2012; 17:00	2× (yellow card) 4× (suspension)	Report	3× (yellow card) 7× (suspension)	Viborg Stadionhal, Viborg; Attendance: 1,420; Referees: Bonifert, Oláh (HUN)

28 October 2012; 15:00	Thüringer HC (Germany)	24 – 20	(Montenegro) Budućnost Podgorica	Salza-Halle, Bad Langensalza; Attendance: 1,900; Referees: Covalciuc, Covalciuc (MDA)
28 October 2012; 15:00	Jakubisová 7	(10–10)	Knežević 6	Salza-Halle, Bad Langensalza; Attendance: 1,900; Referees: Covalciuc, Covalciuc (MDA)
28 October 2012; 15:00	2× (yellow card) 3× (suspension)	Report	3× (yellow card) 3× (suspension)	Salza-Halle, Bad Langensalza; Attendance: 1,900; Referees: Covalciuc, Covalciuc (MDA)

28 October 2012; 17:00	Viborg HK (Denmark)	27 – 28	(Russia) Zvezda Zvenigorod	Viborg Stadionhal, Viborg; Attendance: 1,523; Referees: Mata, López (ESP)
28 October 2012; 17:00	Fisker 7	(12–13)	Nikolić 8	Viborg Stadionhal, Viborg; Attendance: 1,523; Referees: Mata, López (ESP)
28 October 2012; 17:00	3× (yellow card) 3× (suspension)	Report	2× (yellow card) 2× (suspension)	Viborg Stadionhal, Viborg; Attendance: 1,523; Referees: Mata, López (ESP)

4 November 2012; 18:30	Zvezda Zvenigorod (Russia)	20 – 17	(Denmark) Viborg HK	Sport Hall "Olimpiyskiy", Chekhov; Attendance: 700; Referees: Buache, Meyer (SUI)
4 November 2012; 18:30	Lacrabère 6	(8–9)	Ahlm 4	Sport Hall "Olimpiyskiy", Chekhov; Attendance: 700; Referees: Buache, Meyer (SUI)
4 November 2012; 18:30	2× (yellow card) 4× (suspension) 1× (red card)	Report	3× (yellow card)	Sport Hall "Olimpiyskiy", Chekhov; Attendance: 700; Referees: Buache, Meyer (SUI)

4 November 2012; 19:00	Budućnost Podgorica (Montenegro)	23 – 15	(Germany) Thüringer HC	Morača Sports Center, Podgorica; Attendance: 3,200; Referees: Cohen, Peretz (ISR)
4 November 2012; 19:00	Knežević 11	(11–8)	Frey, Gros 3	Morača Sports Center, Podgorica; Attendance: 3,200; Referees: Cohen, Peretz (ISR)
4 November 2012; 19:00	3× (yellow card) 5× (suspension)	Report	2× (yellow card) 4× (suspension)	Morača Sports Center, Podgorica; Attendance: 3,200; Referees: Cohen, Peretz (ISR)

11 November 2012; 17:00	Zvezda Zvenigorod (Russia)	31 – 25	(Montenegro) Budućnost Podgorica	Sport Hall "Olimpiyskiy", Chekhov; Attendance: 1,000; Referees: Brehmer, Skowronek (POL)
11 November 2012; 17:00	three players 9	(17–12)	Knežević 9	Sport Hall "Olimpiyskiy", Chekhov; Attendance: 1,000; Referees: Brehmer, Skowronek (POL)
11 November 2012; 17:00	3× (yellow card) 7× (suspension)	Report	2× (yellow card) 4× (suspension)	Sport Hall "Olimpiyskiy", Chekhov; Attendance: 1,000; Referees: Brehmer, Skowronek (POL)

11 November 2012; 17:00	Viborg HK (Denmark)	26 – 29	(Germany) Thüringer HC	Viborg Stadionhal, Viborg; Attendance: 1,638; Referees: Herczeg, Südi (HUN)
11 November 2012; 17:00	Gulldén 12	(11–16)	Engel 8	Viborg Stadionhal, Viborg; Attendance: 1,638; Referees: Herczeg, Südi (HUN)
11 November 2012; 17:00	2× (yellow card) 3× (suspension)	Report	3× (yellow card) 4× (suspension)	Viborg Stadionhal, Viborg; Attendance: 1,638; Referees: Herczeg, Südi (HUN)

18 November 2012; 15:00	Thüringer HC (Germany)	20 – 23	(Russia) Zvezda Zvenigorod	Salza-Halle, Bad Langensalza; Attendance: 2,218; Referees: Bonaventura, Bonaventura (FRA)
18 November 2012; 15:00	Jakubisová, Wohlbold 5	(7–13)	Postnova 7	Salza-Halle, Bad Langensalza; Attendance: 2,218; Referees: Bonaventura, Bonaventura (FRA)
18 November 2012; 15:00	2× (yellow card) 2× (suspension)	Report	3× (yellow card) 3× (suspension)	Salza-Halle, Bad Langensalza; Attendance: 2,218; Referees: Bonaventura, Bonaventura (FRA)

18 November 2012; 19:00	Budućnost Podgorica (Montenegro)	26 – 23	(Denmark) Viborg HK	Morača Sports Center, Podgorica; Attendance: 4,000; Referees: Cacador, Nicolau (POR)
18 November 2012; 19:00	Knežević 9	(11–10)	Skov 5	Morača Sports Center, Podgorica; Attendance: 4,000; Referees: Cacador, Nicolau (POR)
18 November 2012; 19:00	3× (yellow card) 1× (suspension)	Report	3× (yellow card) 2× (suspension)	Morača Sports Center, Podgorica; Attendance: 4,000; Referees: Cacador, Nicolau (POR)

== Main round ==
The draw of the group matches was held on November 20 at the Gartenhotel Altmannsdorf in Vienna. A total of eight teams were concerned in the process, to be divided into two pots of four. Teams were divided into two pots, based on EHF coefficients. Clubs from the same pot or group could not be drawn into the same group.

=== Seedings ===
Pot 1	Pot 2
(Romania) CS Oltchim Rm. Vâlcea (Hungary) Győri Audi ETO KC (Norway) Larvik HK (Russia) Zvezda Zvenigorod	(Denmark) Randers HK (Slovenia) Krim Ljubljana (Hungary) FTC-Rail Cargo Hungaria (Montenegro) Budućnost Podgorica

=== Group 1 ===
Team	Pld	W	D	L	GF	GA	GD	Pts
(Hungary) Győri Audi ETO KC	6	6	0	0	160	122	+38	12
(Norway) Larvik HK	6	4	0	2	146	133	+13	8
(Montenegro) Budućnost Podgorica	6	1	1	4	116	139	−23	3
(Denmark) Randers HK	6	0	1	5	129	157	−28	1

26 January 2013; 17:15	Larvik HK (Norway)	25 – 19	(Denmark) Randers HK	Arena Larvik, Larvik; Attendance: 1,752; Referees: Schulze, Tönnies (GER)
26 January 2013; 17:15	Riegelhuth Koren 7	(12–9)	Dalby 5	Arena Larvik, Larvik; Attendance: 1,752; Referees: Schulze, Tönnies (GER)
26 January 2013; 17:15	3× (yellow card) 2× (suspension)	Report	3× (yellow card) 2× (suspension)	Arena Larvik, Larvik; Attendance: 1,752; Referees: Schulze, Tönnies (GER)

2 February 2013; 16:00	Győri Audi ETO KC (Hungary)	27 – 17	(Montenegro) Budućnost Podgorica	Magvassy Mihály Sportcsarnok, Győr; Attendance: 1,800; Referees: Zotin, Volodkov (RUS)
2 February 2013; 16:00	Görbicz 7	(14–7)	Knežević 6	Magvassy Mihály Sportcsarnok, Győr; Attendance: 1,800; Referees: Zotin, Volodkov (RUS)
2 February 2013; 16:00	3× (yellow card) 4× (suspension)	Report	3× (yellow card) 4× (suspension)	Magvassy Mihály Sportcsarnok, Győr; Attendance: 1,800; Referees: Zotin, Volodkov (RUS)

10 February 2013; 19:00	Budućnost Podgorica (Montenegro)	18 – 20	(Norway) Larvik HK	Morača Sports Center, Podgorica; Attendance: 4,500; Referees: Horáček, Novotný (CZE)
10 February 2013; 19:00	Bulatović 5	(9–8)	Sulland 6	Morača Sports Center, Podgorica; Attendance: 4,500; Referees: Horáček, Novotný (CZE)
10 February 2013; 19:00	3× (yellow card) 2× (suspension)	Report	3× (yellow card) 3× (suspension)	Morača Sports Center, Podgorica; Attendance: 4,500; Referees: Horáček, Novotný (CZE)

11 February 2013; 19:00	Randers HK (Denmark)	18 – 25	(Hungary) Győri Audi ETO KC	Elro Arena Randers, Randers; Attendance: 1,374; Referees: Brunovský, Čanda (SVK)
11 February 2013; 19:00	Andersen 4	(9–14)	Görbicz, Løke 6	Elro Arena Randers, Randers; Attendance: 1,374; Referees: Brunovský, Čanda (SVK)
11 February 2013; 19:00	3× (yellow card) 4× (suspension) 1× (red card)	Report	3× (yellow card) 4× (suspension)	Elro Arena Randers, Randers; Attendance: 1,374; Referees: Brunovský, Čanda (SVK)

16 February 2013; 17:45	Larvik HK (Norway)	18 – 24	(Hungary) Győri Audi ETO KC	Arena Larvik, Larvik; Attendance: 4,930; Referees: Stark, Stefan (ROU)
16 February 2013; 17:45	Riegelhuth Koren 4	(10–8)	Rédei Soós 6	Arena Larvik, Larvik; Attendance: 4,930; Referees: Stark, Stefan (ROU)
16 February 2013; 17:45	1× (yellow card) 5× (suspension)	Report	1× (yellow card) 3× (suspension)	Arena Larvik, Larvik; Attendance: 4,930; Referees: Stark, Stefan (ROU)

17 February 2013; 19:00	Budućnost Podgorica (Montenegro)	24 – 22	(Denmark) Randers HK	Morača Sports Center, Podgorica; Attendance: 3,500; Referees: Baranowski, Lemanowicz (POL)
17 February 2013; 19:00	Knežević 10	(12–11)	Dalby 7	Morača Sports Center, Podgorica; Attendance: 3,500; Referees: Baranowski, Lemanowicz (POL)
17 February 2013; 19:00	3× (yellow card) 4× (suspension)	Report	3× (yellow card) 3× (suspension)	Morača Sports Center, Podgorica; Attendance: 3,500; Referees: Baranowski, Lemanowicz (POL)

2 March 2013; 15:00	Randers HK (Denmark)	20 – 20	(Montenegro) Budućnost Podgorica	Elro Arena Randers, Randers; Attendance: 1,400; Referees: Gousko, Repkin (BLR)
2 March 2013; 15:00	Dembélé 7	(11–8)	Cvijić 6	Elro Arena Randers, Randers; Attendance: 1,400; Referees: Gousko, Repkin (BLR)
2 March 2013; 15:00	3× (yellow card) 3× (suspension)	Report	3× (yellow card) 2× (suspension)	Elro Arena Randers, Randers; Attendance: 1,400; Referees: Gousko, Repkin (BLR)

2 March 2013; 16:00	Győri Audi ETO KC (Hungary)	30 – 24	(Norway) Larvik HK	Magvassy Mihály Sportcsarnok, Győr; Attendance: 2,000; Referees: Cohen, Peretz (ISR)
2 March 2013; 16:00	Amorim 7	(15–13)	Riegelhuth Koren 6	Magvassy Mihály Sportcsarnok, Győr; Attendance: 2,000; Referees: Cohen, Peretz (ISR)
2 March 2013; 16:00	4× (yellow card) 2× (suspension)	Report	3× (yellow card) 4× (suspension)	Magvassy Mihály Sportcsarnok, Győr; Attendance: 2,000; Referees: Cohen, Peretz (ISR)

9 March 2013; 15:00	Randers HK (Denmark)	26 – 31	(Norway) Larvik HK	Elro Arena Randers, Randers; Attendance: 1,673; Referees: Gubica, Milošević (CRO)
9 March 2013; 15:00	Dalby 8	(15–15)	three players 6	Elro Arena Randers, Randers; Attendance: 1,673; Referees: Gubica, Milošević (CRO)
9 March 2013; 15:00	3× (yellow card) 2× (suspension)	Report	3× (yellow card) 4× (suspension)	Elro Arena Randers, Randers; Attendance: 1,673; Referees: Gubica, Milošević (CRO)

10 March 2013; 19:00	Budućnost Podgorica (Montenegro)	21 – 22	(Hungary) Győri Audi ETO KC	Morača Sports Center, Podgorica; Attendance: 4,500; Referees: Dentz, Reibel (FRA)
10 March 2013; 19:00	Cvijić 6	(12–13)	Görbicz 7	Morača Sports Center, Podgorica; Attendance: 4,500; Referees: Dentz, Reibel (FRA)
10 March 2013; 19:00	3× (yellow card) 4× (suspension)	Report	3× (yellow card) 4× (suspension) 1× (red card)	Morača Sports Center, Podgorica; Attendance: 4,500; Referees: Dentz, Reibel (FRA)

16 March 2013; 16:00	Győri Audi ETO KC (Hungary)	32 – 24	(Denmark) Randers HK	Magvassy Mihály Sportcsarnok, Győr; Attendance: 1,800; Referees: Marić, Mašić (SRB)
16 March 2013; 16:00	Görbicz, Radičević 6	(15–12)	Dalby, Jacobsen 5	Magvassy Mihály Sportcsarnok, Győr; Attendance: 1,800; Referees: Marić, Mašić (SRB)
16 March 2013; 16:00	2× (yellow card)	Report	3× (yellow card) 4× (suspension)	Magvassy Mihály Sportcsarnok, Győr; Attendance: 1,800; Referees: Marić, Mašić (SRB)

16 March 2013; 17:45	Larvik HK (Norway)	28 – 16	(Montenegro) Budućnost Podgorica	Arena Larvik, Larvik; Attendance: 2,025; Referees: Opava, Válek (CZE)
16 March 2013; 17:45	Hammerseng 8	(13–5)	Knežević 5	Arena Larvik, Larvik; Attendance: 2,025; Referees: Opava, Válek (CZE)
16 March 2013; 17:45	2× (yellow card) 3× (suspension)	Report	3× (yellow card) 2× (suspension)	Arena Larvik, Larvik; Attendance: 2,025; Referees: Opava, Válek (CZE)

=== Group 2 ===
Team	Pld	W	D	L	GF	GA	GD	Pts
(Slovenia) Krim Ljubljana	6	4	0	2	161	149	+12	8
(Romania) CS Oltchim Rm. Vâlcea	6	4	0	2	154	142	+12	8
(Hungary) FTC-Rail Cargo Hungaria	6	3	0	3	163	173	−10	6
(Russia) Zvezda Zvenigorod	6	1	0	5	159	173	−14	2

3 February 2013; 17:00	Zvezda Zvenigorod (Russia)	24 – 29	(Slovenia) Krim Ljubljana	Sport Hall "Olimpiyskiy", Chekhov; Attendance: 1,200; Referees: Bonaventura, Bonaventura (FRA)
3 February 2013; 17:00	Portjanko 7	(14–15)	Martín 8	Sport Hall "Olimpiyskiy", Chekhov; Attendance: 1,200; Referees: Bonaventura, Bonaventura (FRA)
3 February 2013; 17:00	3× (yellow card) 1× (suspension)	Report	3× (yellow card) 5× (suspension)	Sport Hall "Olimpiyskiy", Chekhov; Attendance: 1,200; Referees: Bonaventura, Bonaventura (FRA)

3 February 2013; 19:00	CS Oltchim Rm. Vâlcea (Romania)	22 – 23	(Hungary) FTC Rail-Cargo Hungaria	Traian Sports Hall, Râmnicu Vâlcea; Attendance: 3,028; Referees: Leszczyński, Piechota (POL)
3 February 2013; 19:00	Barbosa 7	(9–10)	Pena 10	Traian Sports Hall, Râmnicu Vâlcea; Attendance: 3,028; Referees: Leszczyński, Piechota (POL)
3 February 2013; 19:00	3× (yellow card) 3× (suspension)	Report	3× (yellow card) 3× (suspension)	Traian Sports Hall, Râmnicu Vâlcea; Attendance: 3,028; Referees: Leszczyński, Piechota (POL)

10 February 2013; 17:00	FTC-Rail Cargo Hungaria (Hungary)	35 – 34	(Russia) Zvezda Zvenigorod	OBO Aréna, Dabas; Attendance: 2,498; Referees: Nikolić, Stojković (SRB)
10 February 2013; 17:00	Tomori 15	(18–17)	four players 5	OBO Aréna, Dabas; Attendance: 2,498; Referees: Nikolić, Stojković (SRB)
10 February 2013; 17:00	3× (yellow card) 6× (suspension)	Report	3× (yellow card) 6× (suspension)	OBO Aréna, Dabas; Attendance: 2,498; Referees: Nikolić, Stojković (SRB)

10 February 2013; 19:30	Krim Ljubljana (Slovenia)	28 – 24	(Romania) CS Oltchim Rm. Vâlcea	Arena Stožice, Ljubljana; Attendance: 3,500; Referees: Geipel, Helbig (GER)
10 February 2013; 19:30	Penezić 11	(13–10)	Bulatović 10	Arena Stožice, Ljubljana; Attendance: 3,500; Referees: Geipel, Helbig (GER)
10 February 2013; 19:30	3× (yellow card) 1× (suspension)	Report	2× (yellow card) 1× (suspension)	Arena Stožice, Ljubljana; Attendance: 3,500; Referees: Geipel, Helbig (GER)

16 February 2013; 19:00	CS Oltchim Rm. Vâlcea (Romania)	29 – 25	(Russia) Zvezda Zvenigorod	Traian Sports Hall, Râmnicu Vâlcea; Attendance: 2,873; Referees: Nikolov, Nachevski (MKD)
16 February 2013; 19:00	Bulatović 10	(16–16)	Postnova 6	Traian Sports Hall, Râmnicu Vâlcea; Attendance: 2,873; Referees: Nikolov, Nachevski (MKD)
16 February 2013; 19:00	3× (yellow card) 1× (suspension)	Report	3× (yellow card) 3× (suspension)	Traian Sports Hall, Râmnicu Vâlcea; Attendance: 2,873; Referees: Nikolov, Nachevski (MKD)

17 February 2013; 15:15	FTC-Rail Cargo Hungaria (Hungary)	30 – 26	(Slovenia) Krim Ljubljana	OBO Aréna, Dabas; Attendance: 2,498; Referees: Kijauskaite, Zaliene (LTU)
17 February 2013; 15:15	Tomori 10	(14–15)	Penezić 9	OBO Aréna, Dabas; Attendance: 2,498; Referees: Kijauskaite, Zaliene (LTU)
17 February 2013; 15:15	2× (suspension)	Report	4× (suspension)	OBO Aréna, Dabas; Attendance: 2,498; Referees: Kijauskaite, Zaliene (LTU)

2 March 2013; 17:00	Zvezda Zvenigorod (Russia)	23 – 26	(Romania) CS Oltchim Rm. Vâlcea	Sport Hall "Olimpiyskiy", Chekhov; Attendance: 650; Referees: Schulze, Tönnies (GER)
2 March 2013; 17:00	Marennikova, Postnova 6	(15–13)	Bulatović 7	Sport Hall "Olimpiyskiy", Chekhov; Attendance: 650; Referees: Schulze, Tönnies (GER)
2 March 2013; 17:00	2× (yellow card) 2× (suspension)	Report	3× (suspension)	Sport Hall "Olimpiyskiy", Chekhov; Attendance: 650; Referees: Schulze, Tönnies (GER)

3 March 2013; 19:30	Krim Ljubljana (Slovenia)	31 – 25	(Hungary) FTC-Rail Cargo Hungaria	Arena Stožice, Ljubljana; Attendance: 3,500; Referees: Stoļarovs, Līcis (LAT)
3 March 2013; 19:30	Penezić 8	(15–12)	Tomori 8	Arena Stožice, Ljubljana; Attendance: 3,500; Referees: Stoļarovs, Līcis (LAT)
3 March 2013; 19:30	2× (yellow card) 3× (suspension)	Report	2× (yellow card) 1× (suspension)	Arena Stožice, Ljubljana; Attendance: 3,500; Referees: Stoļarovs, Līcis (LAT)

9 March 2013; 16:00	FTC-Rail Cargo Hungaria (Hungary)	23 – 30	(Romania) CS Oltchim Rm. Vâlcea	OBO Aréna, Dabas; Attendance: 2,498; Referees: Bonaventura, Bonaventura (FRA)
9 March 2013; 16:00	Tomori 7	(15–15)	Bulatović 7	OBO Aréna, Dabas; Attendance: 2,498; Referees: Bonaventura, Bonaventura (FRA)
9 March 2013; 16:00	3× (yellow card) 1× (suspension)	Report	3× (yellow card) 4× (suspension)	OBO Aréna, Dabas; Attendance: 2,498; Referees: Bonaventura, Bonaventura (FRA)

10 March 2013; 19:30	Krim Ljubljana (Slovenia)	27 – 23	(Russia) Zvezda Zvenigorod	Arena Stožice, Ljubljana; Attendance: 3,800; Referees: Delle, Engber (SWE)
10 March 2013; 19:30	Torstensson 6	(11–13)	Postnova 7	Arena Stožice, Ljubljana; Attendance: 3,800; Referees: Delle, Engber (SWE)
10 March 2013; 19:30	2× (yellow card) 3× (suspension)	Report	3× (yellow card) 2× (suspension)	Arena Stožice, Ljubljana; Attendance: 3,800; Referees: Delle, Engber (SWE)

16 March 2013; 17:00	Zvezda Zvenigorod (Russia)	30 – 27	(Hungary) FTC-Rail Cargo Hungaria	Sport Hall "Olimpiyskiy", Chekhov; Attendance: 800; Referees: Stenrand, Birch (DEN)
16 March 2013; 17:00	Postnova 8	(12–16)	Szucsánszki, Tomori 10	Sport Hall "Olimpiyskiy", Chekhov; Attendance: 800; Referees: Stenrand, Birch (DEN)
16 March 2013; 17:00	3× (yellow card)	Report	3× (yellow card) 2× (suspension)	Sport Hall "Olimpiyskiy", Chekhov; Attendance: 800; Referees: Stenrand, Birch (DEN)

17 March 2013; 19:00	CS Oltchim Rm. Vâlcea (Romania)	23 – 20	(Slovenia) Krim Ljubljana	Traian Sports Hall, Râmnicu Vâlcea; Attendance: 3,140; Referees: Baďura, Ondogrecula (SVK)
17 March 2013; 19:00	Farcău 7	(9–12)	Penezić, Wörz 4	Traian Sports Hall, Râmnicu Vâlcea; Attendance: 3,140; Referees: Baďura, Ondogrecula (SVK)
17 March 2013; 19:00	3× (yellow card) 2× (suspension)	Report	3× (yellow card) 6× (suspension)	Traian Sports Hall, Râmnicu Vâlcea; Attendance: 3,140; Referees: Baďura, Ondogrecula (SVK)
