= 2017–18 Women's EHF Champions League qualifying =

This article describes the qualifying of the 2017–18 Women's EHF Champions League.

== Draw ==
The draw was held on 29 June 2016 at 11:00 in Vienna, Austria. The eight teams were split in two groups and played a semifinal and final to determine the last participants. Matches were played on 9 and 10 September 2016.

=== Seedings ===
The seedings were announced on 27 June 2017.

Pot 1	Pot 2	Pot 3	Pot 4
(Norway) Vipers Kristiansand (Germany) Thüringer HC	(Sweden) H 65 Höör (Croatia) Podravka Koprivnica	(Austria) Hypo Niederösterreich (Turkey) Kastamonu Belediyesi	(Belarus) HC Gomel (Spain) CB Atlético Guardés

== Qualification tournament 1 ==
Vipers Kristiansand hosted the tournament.

=== Bracket ===
Semifinals
9 September
(Norway) Vipers Kristiansand	43
(Belarus) HC Gomel	19
9 September
(Croatia) Podravka Koprivnica	21
(Turkey) Kastamonu Belediyesi	17

Final
10 September
(Norway) Vipers Kristiansand	42
(Croatia) Podravka Koprivnica	14
Third place
10 September
(Belarus) HC Gomel	29
(Turkey) Kastamonu Belediyesi	28

=== Semifinals ===
9 September 2017; 17:00	Vipers Kristiansand (Norway)	43–19	(Belarus) HC Gomel	Aquarama Kristiansand, Kristiansand; Attendance: 1,358; Referees: Brehmer, Skowronek (POL)
9 September 2017; 17:00	Sulland 8	(27–10)	Agbaba 5	Aquarama Kristiansand, Kristiansand; Attendance: 1,358; Referees: Brehmer, Skowronek (POL)
9 September 2017; 17:00	3× (yellow card) 8× (suspension) 1× (red card)	Report	2× (yellow card) 4× (suspension)	Aquarama Kristiansand, Kristiansand; Attendance: 1,358; Referees: Brehmer, Skowronek (POL)

9 September 2017; 19:30	Podravka Koprivnica (Croatia)	21–17	(Turkey) Kastamonu Belediyesi	Aquarama Kristiansand, Kristiansand; Attendance: 170; Referees: Kijauskaitė, Žalienė (LTU)
9 September 2017; 19:30	Nemaškalo 7	(11–11)	Elez 9	Aquarama Kristiansand, Kristiansand; Attendance: 170; Referees: Kijauskaitė, Žalienė (LTU)
9 September 2017; 19:30	3× (yellow card) 3× (suspension)	Report	2× (yellow card) 3× (suspension)	Aquarama Kristiansand, Kristiansand; Attendance: 170; Referees: Kijauskaitė, Žalienė (LTU)

=== Third place game ===
10 September 2017; 16:00	HC Gomel (Belarus)	29–28	(Turkey) Kastamonu Belediyesi	Aquarama Kristiansand, Kristiansand; Attendance: 222; Referees: Brehmer, Skowronek (POL)
10 September 2017; 16:00	Akhramenka, Tsyrybka 5	(13–13)	three players 5	Aquarama Kristiansand, Kristiansand; Attendance: 222; Referees: Brehmer, Skowronek (POL)
10 September 2017; 16:00	3× (yellow card) 4× (suspension)	Report	3× (yellow card) 4× (suspension)	Aquarama Kristiansand, Kristiansand; Attendance: 222; Referees: Brehmer, Skowronek (POL)

=== Final ===
10 September 2017; 18:30	Vipers Kristiansand (Norway)	42–14	(Croatia) Podravka Koprivnica	Aquarama Kristiansand, Kristiansand; Attendance: 1,648; Referees: Kijauskaitė, Žalienė (LTU)
10 September 2017; 18:30	Larsen 8	(22–6)	Džono, Nemaškalo 3	Aquarama Kristiansand, Kristiansand; Attendance: 1,648; Referees: Kijauskaitė, Žalienė (LTU)
10 September 2017; 18:30	2× (yellow card) 1× (suspension)	Report	1× (yellow card) 6× (suspension)	Aquarama Kristiansand, Kristiansand; Attendance: 1,648; Referees: Kijauskaitė, Žalienė (LTU)

== Qualification tournament 2 ==
Thüringer HC hosted the tournament.

=== Bracket ===
Semifinals
9 September
(Germany) Thüringer HC	31
(Spain) CB Atlético Guardés	21
9 September
(Sweden) H 65 Höör	32
(Austria) Hypo Niederösterreich	19

Final
10 September
(Germany) Thüringer HC	33
(Sweden) H 65 Höör	24
Third place
10 September
(Spain) CB Atlético Guardés	27
(Austria) Hypo Niederösterreich	29

=== Semifinals ===
9 September 2017; 14:00	Thüringer HC (Germany)	31–21	(Spain) CB Atlético Guardés	Wiedigsburghalle, Nordhausen; Attendance: 1,023; Referees: Mitrevski, Todorovski (MKD)
9 September 2017; 14:00	Jakubisová 6	(13–9)	Egozkue 6	Wiedigsburghalle, Nordhausen; Attendance: 1,023; Referees: Mitrevski, Todorovski (MKD)
9 September 2017; 14:00	3× (yellow card) 4× (suspension)	Report	3× (yellow card) 3× (suspension)	Wiedigsburghalle, Nordhausen; Attendance: 1,023; Referees: Mitrevski, Todorovski (MKD)

9 September 2017; 16:30	H 65 Höör (Sweden)	32–19	(Austria) Hypo Niederösterreich	Wiedigsburghalle, Nordhausen; Attendance: 1,023; Referees: Marić, Mašić (SRB)
9 September 2017; 16:30	Lindqvist 7	(14–12)	Topic 5	Wiedigsburghalle, Nordhausen; Attendance: 1,023; Referees: Marić, Mašić (SRB)
9 September 2017; 16:30	3× (yellow card) 3× (suspension)	Report	2× (yellow card) 1× (suspension)	Wiedigsburghalle, Nordhausen; Attendance: 1,023; Referees: Marić, Mašić (SRB)

=== Third place game ===
10 September 2017; 12:30	CB Atlético Guardés (Spain)	27–29	(Austria) Hypo Niederösterreich	Wiedigsburghalle, Nordhausen; Attendance: 700; Referees: Mitrevski, Todorovski (MKD)
10 September 2017; 12:30	Egozkue 7	(11–11)	Kiss 9	Wiedigsburghalle, Nordhausen; Attendance: 700; Referees: Mitrevski, Todorovski (MKD)
10 September 2017; 12:30	3× (yellow card) 5× (suspension)	Report	3× (yellow card) 6× (suspension)	Wiedigsburghalle, Nordhausen; Attendance: 700; Referees: Mitrevski, Todorovski (MKD)

=== Final ===
10 September 2017; 15:00	Thüringer HC (Germany)	33–24	(Sweden) H 65 Höör	Wiedigsburghalle, Nordhausen; Attendance: 1,300; Referees: Marić, Mašić (SRB)
10 September 2017; 15:00	Jakubisová 8	(16–9)	Bardis 5	Wiedigsburghalle, Nordhausen; Attendance: 1,300; Referees: Marić, Mašić (SRB)
10 September 2017; 15:00	3× (yellow card) 3× (suspension)	Report	2× (yellow card) 7× (suspension)	Wiedigsburghalle, Nordhausen; Attendance: 1,300; Referees: Marić, Mašić (SRB)
