= Johanna Heldmann =

German handball player (born 1995)

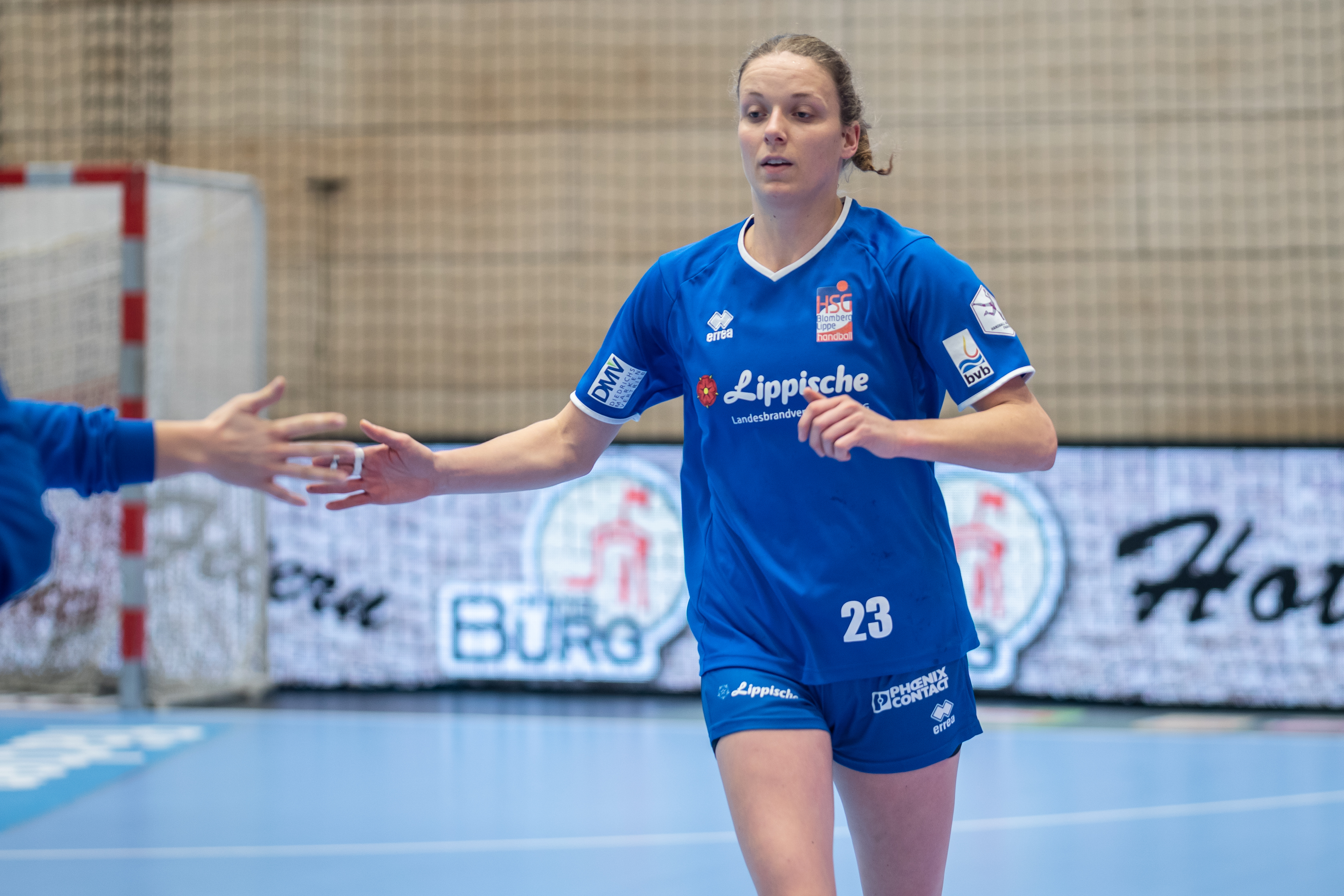
- Heldmann in March 2021

Personal information
- Nationality: German
- Born: 31 August 1995 (age 31) Bonn, Germany
- Height: 1.77 m (5 ft 10 in)

Sport
- Sport: Handball
- Position: Right wing

Senior clubs
- Years: Team
- 2011–2016: Bayer 04 Leverkusen
- 2016–2017: SVG Celle
- 2017–2018: HL Buchholz 08-Rosengarten
- 2018–2019: TV Beyerohde
- 2019–2020: HL Buchholz 08-Rosengarten
- 2020–2023: Buxtehuder SV

Johanna Heldmann (born 31 August 1995) is a former German handball player. She played for Buxtehuder SV in the Frauen Handball-Bundesliga until her retirement in 2023.

Heldmann represented the German junior national team, where she participated at the 2014 Women's Junior World Handball Championship, placing 4th.

In March 2020, Heldmann signed a 2-year contract with the Bundesliga club Buxtehuder SV.

== Achievements ==
- Bundesliga:
  - Bronze: 2013
- DHB-Pokal:
  - Finalist: 2012
