= Lea Rühter =

German handball player (born 1998)

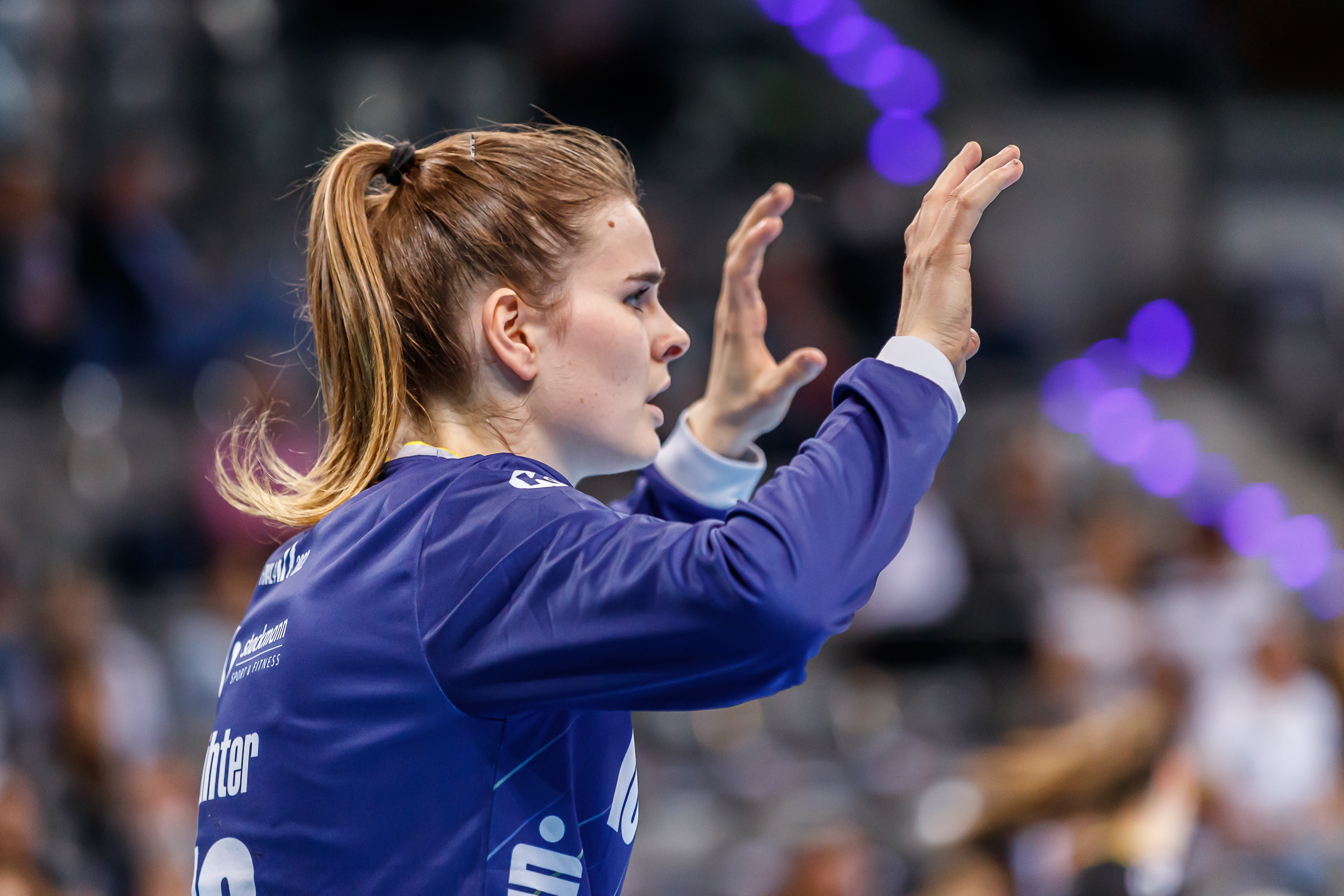
- Rühter in May 2022

Personal information
- Nationality: German
- Born: 12 February 1998 (age 28) Hamburg, Germany
- Height: 1.83 m (6 ft 0 in)

Sport
- Sport: Handball
- Position: Line player
- Current club: Buxtehuder SV
- Number: 29

Senior clubs
- Years: Team
- 2014-2017: Buxtehuder SV
- 2017-2018: HL Buchholz 08-Rosengarten
- 2018-: Buxtehuder SV
National team
Years	Team	Apps	(Gls)
2018–	Germany	4	(0)

Lea Rühter (born 12 February 1998) is a German handball player for Buxtehuder SV in the Frauen Handball-Bundesliga and the German national team.

Rühter also represented the German junior national team, where she participated at the 2018 Women's Junior World Handball Championship, placing 13th and the 2017 Women's U-19 European Handball Championship.

In the 2017–18 season, she signed a 1-year contract on loan with HL Buchholz 08-Rosengarten.

She made her debut on the German national team on 28 September 2018, against Russia.

== Achievements ==
- Bundesliga:
  - Silver: 2015
  - Bronze: 2014, 2022
- DHB-Pokal:
  - Winner: 2015, 2017
