= Gitte Andersen =

Gitte Andersen may refer to:

- Gitte Andersen (footballer) (born 1977), Danish football defender
- Gitte Andersen (handballer) (born 1989), Danish handball player
