= Dirk Leun =

German handball coach

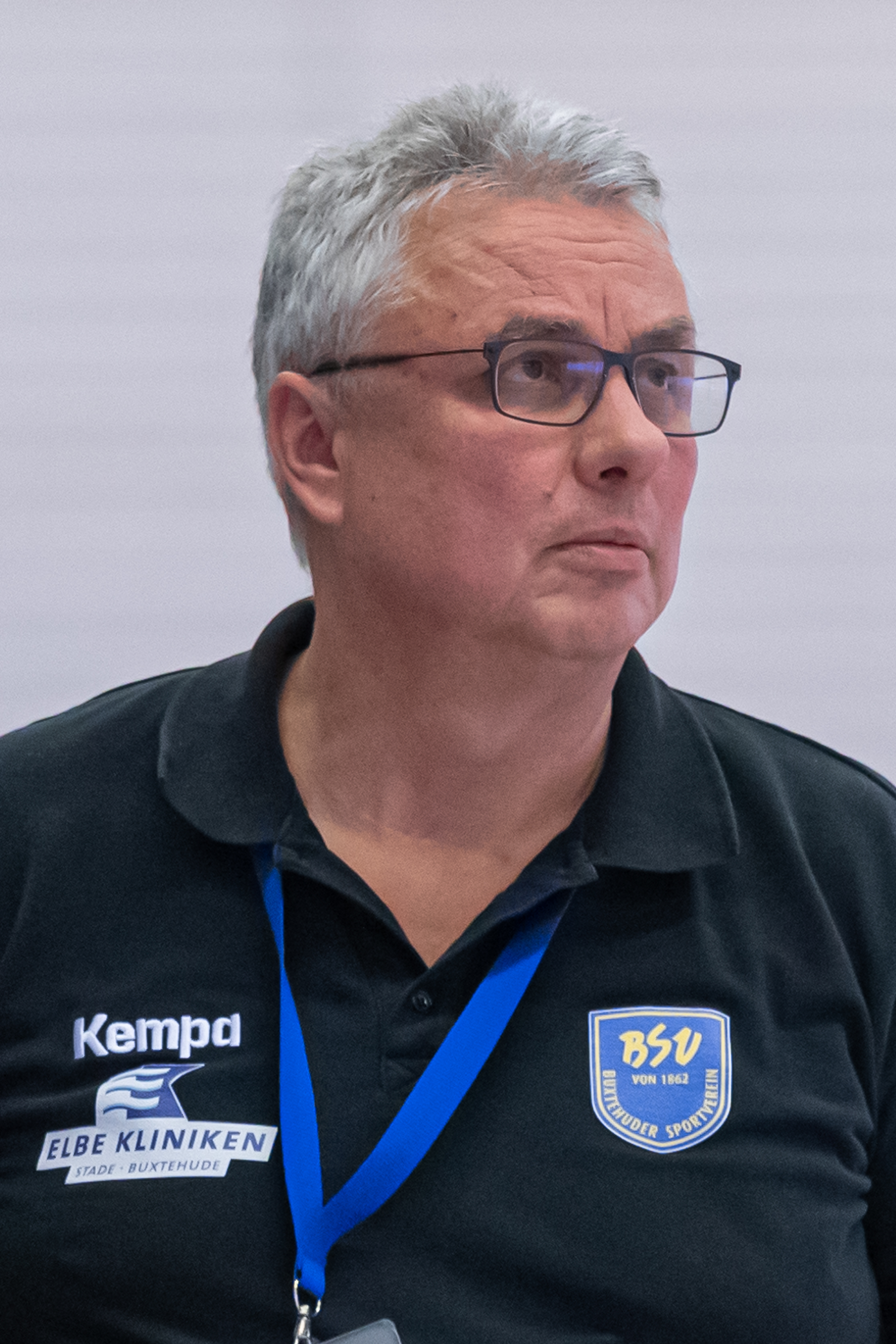
- Leun in 2019

Personal information
- Nationality: German
- Born: 11 April 1964 (age 62) Lich, West Germany
- Height: 1.89 m (6 ft 2 in)

Sport
- Sport: Handball
- Current club: Buxtehuder SV (head coach)

Teams managed
- Years: Team
- 1999–2004: TV Mainzlar
- 2004–2006: TGS Walldorf
- 2008–: Buxtehuder SV

Dirk Leun (born 11 April 1964) is a German handball coach. He is the current head coach of Buxtehuder SV in the Handball-Bundesliga Frauen.

== Coaching career ==
Between 1999 and 2004, Leun coached Bundesliga women's team TV Mainzlar, with whom he won the DHB Cup in 2001. Leun then moved to regional league club TGS Walldorf. In June 2008, Leun was appointed as new head coach of Buxtehuder SV. In the 2009–10 season, the club won the EHF Challenge Cup defeating Frisch Auf Göppingen in the finals.

In 2016, the club won silver in the Handball-Bundesliga Frauen in the 2010–11 and 2011–12 seasons, which also led to participation in the 2012–13 Women's EHF Champions League.

He also won the German Youth Championship with the club's youth team in 2016.

He coached the German youth national team at the 2008 Women's Junior World Handball Championship in Macedonia, which managed to win the tournament. In January 2015, Leun showed interest for coaching the German national team and said it was a "very attractive job". However, Jakob Vestergaard was presented as the new national coach.
