= Willemijn Karsten =

Dutch handball player (born 1986)

Personal information
- Nationality: Dutch
- Born: 28 June 1986 (age 40) Hoorn, Netherlands
- Height: 173 cm (68 in)

Sport
- Sport: Handball
- Position: Back

Senior clubs
- Years: Team
- –2007: Zeeman Vastgoed/SEW
- 2007–2008: Buxtehuder SV
- 2008–2009: Borussia Dortmund Handball
- 2009–2011: DJK/MJC Trier
- 2011–2012: Thüringer HC
National team
| Years | Team | Apps | (Gls) |
| 2004–2012 | Netherlands | 105 | (124) |

Willemijn Karsten (born 28 June 1986) is a Dutch former team handball player. She played on the Dutch national team, and participated at the 2011 World Women's Handball Championship in Brazil.
