= 2012–13 EHF Women's Champions League =

Tournament details
- Dates: 22 September 2012 – 12 May 2013
- Teams: 17 (qualification stage); 16 (group stage); 8 (Main round); 4 (knockout stage)

Final positions
- Champions: (Hungary) Győri Audi ETO KC (1st title)
- Runners-up: (Norway) Larvik HK

Tournament statistics
- Matches played: 78
- Goals scored: 4,012 (51.44 per match)
- Attendance: 179,511 (2,301 per match)
- Top scorer(s): (Hungary) Zsuzsanna Tomori (95 goals)

The 2012–13 EHF Women's Champions League was the 20th edition of the EHF Women's Champions League, the competition for top women's clubs of Europe, organized and supervised by the European Handball Federation. Budućnost Podgorica was title holder, after beating Győri Audi ETO KC in past season's final.

Győri redeemed themselves by winning this season's edition. They defeated Larvik HK 47–43 in the final.

== Overview ==
=== Format ===
A few changes had been made in the competition's format. The first qualifying tournament has been deleted. As past season the second qualifying tournament was played under a final four format. A Wild Card Tournament with three teams was organized, the winner were qualified for the Group Phase. In addition, a knock-out match between one team from Pot 1 of the QT2 and a team from Pot 2 of the QT2 was played. The winner also qualified for the Group Phase.

=== Team allocation ===
28 teams from 19 federations participated to the Women's Champions League this season. Places were distributed according to the EHF league coefficient, which took into account the performances in European competitions from 2008–09 to 2010–11.

Group matches
(Austria) Hypo Niederösterreich	(Croatia) RK Podravka Koprivnica	(Denmark) Randers HK	(Germany) Thüringer HC
(Hungary) Győri Audi ETO KC	(Montenegro) ŽRK Budućnost Podgorica	(Norway) Larvik HK	(Romania) CS Oltchim Rm. Vâlcea
(Russia) Dinamo Volgograd	(Slovenia) Krim Ljubljana	(Sweden) IK Sävehof	Wild Card Tournament Winner
WQT1	WQT2	WQT3	Knock-out game winner
Qualification Tournament
(Denmark) Viborg HK	(Germany) Buxtehuder SV	(Hungary) FTC-Rail Cargo Hungaria	(North Macedonia) ŽRK Metalurg
(Netherlands) SERCODAK Dalfsen	(Norway) Byåsen HE	(Poland) Vistal Łączpol Gdynia	(Romania) Universitatea Cluj
(Russia) Rostov-Don	(Serbia) RK Zaječar	(Slovakia) IUVENTA Michalovce	(Spain) Balonmano Bera-Bera
(Switzerland) LC Brühl	(Turkey) Muratpaşa BSK		
Wild Card Tournament
(France) Issy-Paris Hand	(Russia) Zvezda Zvenigorod	(Germany) HC Leipzig	

th Title Holder

=== Round and draw dates ===
The draws will be held in Vienna, Austria and Herzogenaurach, Germany.

Phase	Round	Draw date	First leg	Second leg
Qualifying	Qualification Tournament 2	3 July 2012	22–23 September 2012	
Qualifying	Wild Card Tournament	3 July 2012	22–23 September 2012	
Group stage	Matchday 1	6 July 2012	13–14 October 2012	
Group stage	Matchday 2	6 July 2012	20–21 October 2012	
Group stage	Matchday 3	6 July 2012	27–28 October 2012	
Group stage	Matchday 4	6 July 2012	3–4 November 2012	
Group stage	Matchday 5	6 July 2012	10–11 November 2012	
Group stage	Matchday 6	6 July 2012	17–18 November 2012	
Main round	Matchday 1	20 November 2012	2–3 February 2013	
Main round	Matchday 2	20 November 2012	9–10 February 2013	
Main round	Matchday 3	20 November 2012	16–17 February 2013	
Main round	Matchday 4	20 November 2012	2–3 March 2013	
Main round	Matchday 5	20 November 2012	9–10 March 2013	
Main round	Matchday 6	20 November 2012	16–17 March 2013	
Knockout phase	Semifinals	—	6–7 April 2013	13–14 April 2013
Knockout phase	Finals	16 April 2013	4–5 May 2013	11–12 May 2013

== Qualification stage ==
=== Qualification tournament ===
A total of 14 teams took part in the qualification tournaments. The clubs were drawn into three groups of four and played a semifinal and the final. The winner of the qualification groups advanced to the group stage, while the eliminated clubs went to the EHF Cup. Matches were played at 8–9 September 2011. The draw took place on 3 July, at 11:00 local time at Vienna, Austria.

=== Seedings ===
The two remaining teams from Pot 1 and 4 played a knock-out match, the winner went into the group stage. The draw was held on 3 July 2012.

Pot 1	Pot 2	Pot 3	Pot 4
(Norway) Byåsen HE (Hungary) FTC-Rail Cargo Hungaria (Romania) Universitatea Cluj (Denmark) Viborg HK	(Spain) Balonmano Bera-Bera (Russia) Rostov-Don (Germany) Buxtehuder SV	(Poland) Vistal Łączpol Gdynia (Netherlands) SERCODAK Dalfsen (Serbia) RK Zaječar	(North Macedonia) ŽRK Metalurg (Turkey) Muratpaşa BSK (Slovakia) IUVENTA Michalovce (Switzerland) LC Brühl

=== Qualification tournament 1 ===
Viborg HK organized the event.

Semi-finals
22 September 2012
(Denmark) Viborg HK	30
(Switzerland) LC Brühl	14
22 September 2012
(Spain) Balonmano Bera-Bera	22
(Poland) Vistal Łączpol Gdynia	31

Final
23 September 2012
(Denmark) Viborg HK	26
(Poland) Vistal Łączpol Gdynia	22
Third place
23 September 2012
(Switzerland) LC Brühl	23
(Spain) Balonmano Bera-Bera	33

=== Qualification tournament 2 ===
Byåsen HE organized the event.

Semi-finals
22 September 2012
(Norway) Byåsen HE	29
(North Macedonia) ŽRK Metalurg	19
22 September 2012
(Germany) Buxtehuder SV	34
(Netherlands) SERCODAK Dalfsen	31

Final
23 September 2012
(Norway) Byåsen HE	22
(Germany) Buxtehuder SV	26
Third place
23 September 2012
(North Macedonia) ŽRK Metalurg	34
(Netherlands) SERCODAK Dalfsen	26

=== Qualification tournament 3 ===
Universitatea Cluj organized the event.

Semi-finals
22 September 2012
(Romania) Universitatea Cluj	34
(Turkey) Muratpaşa BSK	26
22 September 2012
(Russia) Rostov-Don	29
(Serbia) RK Zaječar	28

Final
23 September 2012
(Romania) Universitatea Cluj	23
(Russia) Rostov-Don	22
Third place
23 September 2012
(Turkey) Muratpaşa BSK	27
(Serbia) RK Zaječar	35

=== Play-off ===
IUVENTA Michalovce and FTC-Rail Cargo Hungaria played a playoff series to determine a participant for the group stage.

19 September 2012; 18:00	IUVENTA Michalovce (Slovakia)	26–40	(Hungary) FTC-Rail Cargo Hungaria	Chemkostav Arena, Chemkostav Arena; Attendance: 1,800; Referees: Marić, Mašić (SRB)
19 September 2012; 18:00	Tobiášová 6	(10–15)	Pena, Tomori 6	Chemkostav Arena, Chemkostav Arena; Attendance: 1,800; Referees: Marić, Mašić (SRB)
19 September 2012; 18:00	2× (yellow card) 4× (suspension)	Report	3× (yellow card) 1× (suspension)	Chemkostav Arena, Chemkostav Arena; Attendance: 1,800; Referees: Marić, Mašić (SRB)

22 September 2012; 18:00	FTC-Rail Cargo Hungaria (Hungary)	31–22	(Slovakia) IUVENTA Michalovce	Elek Gyula Aréna, Budapest; Attendance: 1,000; Referees: Delle, Engberg (SWE)
22 September 2012; 18:00	Pena 6	(16–8)	Wollingerová 5	Elek Gyula Aréna, Budapest; Attendance: 1,000; Referees: Delle, Engberg (SWE)
22 September 2012; 18:00	3× (yellow card) 3× (suspension)	Report	3× (yellow card) 1× (suspension)	Elek Gyula Aréna, Budapest; Attendance: 1,000; Referees: Delle, Engberg (SWE)

FTC-Rail Cargo Hungaria wins 71–48 on aggregate.

=== Wild card tournament ===
Issy-Paris Hand organized the event.

Team	Pld	W	D	L	GF	GA	GD	Pts
(Russia) Zvezda Zvenigorod	2	2	0	0	52	41	+11	4
(Germany) HC Leipzig	2	1	0	1	42	42	0	2
(France) Issy-Paris Hand	2	0	0	2	36	47	−11	0

== Group matches ==
Location of teams of the 2012–13 EHF Women's Champions League group stage.
Red: Group A; Green: Group B; Blue: Group C; Yellow: Group D.

The draw of the group matches was held on 6 July at the Gartenhotel Altmannsdorf in Vienna. A total of sixteen teams were concerned in the process, to be divided into four pots of four. Teams were divided into four pots, based on EHF coefficients. Clubs from the same pot or the same association could not be drawn into the same group, except the wild card tournament winner, which did not enjoy any protection.

=== Seedings ===
Pot 1	Pot 2	Pot 3	Pot 4
(Hungary) Győri Audi ETO KC (Montenegro) ŽRK Budućnost Podgorica (Norway) Larvik HK (Romania) CS Oltchim Rm. Vâlcea	(Denmark) Randers HK (Germany) Thüringer HC (Russia) Dinamo Volgograd (Slovenia) Krim Ljubljana	(Austria) Hypo Niederösterreich (Croatia) RK Podravka Koprivnica (Sweden) IK Sävehof (Russia) Zvezda Zvenigorod	(Denmark) Viborg HK (Germany) Buxtehuder SV (Romania) Universitatea Cluj (Hungary) FTC-Rail Cargo Hungaria

=== Group A ===
Team	Pld	W	D	L	GF	GA	GD	Pts	CSV	RHK	HYP	BSV
(Romania) CS Oltchim Rm. Vâlcea	6	6	0	0	170	129	+41	12	—	27–23	30–25	30–22
(Denmark) Randers HK	6	3	0	3	166	156	+10	6	20–24	—	29–20	36–26
(Austria) Hypo Niederösterreich	6	3	0	3	156	153	+3	6	24–25	32–25	—	27–24
(Germany) Buxtehuder SV	6	0	0	6	134	188	−54	0	15–34	27–33	20–28	—

=== Group B ===
Team	Pld	W	D	L	GF	GA	GD	Pts	GKC	RKK	KOP	UJC
(Hungary) Győri Audi ETO KC	6	6	0	0	180	134	+46	12	—	29–22	24–19	37–26
(Slovenia) Krim Ljubljana	6	3	0	3	151	157	−6	6	20–31	—	28–22	28–27
(Croatia) Podravka Koprivnica	6	3	0	3	136	143	−7	6	22–29	25–22	—	28–21
(Romania) Universitatea Cluj	6	0	0	6	141	174	−33	0	25–30	23–31	19–20	—

=== Group C ===
Team	Pld	W	D	L	GF	GA	GD	Pts	LHK	FTC	VOL	IKS
(Norway) Larvik HK	6	5	0	1	197	156	+41	10	—	30–23	40–25	39–31
(Hungary) FTC-Rail Cargo Hungaria	6	5	0	1	183	163	+20	10	28–24	—	30–28	31–28
(Russia) Dinamo Volgograd	6	1	0	5	157	200	−43	2	24–35	21–37	—	25–30
(Sweden) IK Sävehof	6	1	0	5	174	192	−18	2	25–29	32–34	28–34	—

=== Group D ===
Team	Pld	W	D	L	GF	GA	GD	Pts	ZVE	ŽRK	THC	VHK
(Russia) Zvezda Zvenigorod	6	5	0	1	154	142	+12	10	—	31–25	31–24	20–17
(Montenegro) Budućnost Podgorica	6	4	0	2	149	134	+15	8	29–21	—	23–15	26–23
(Germany) Thüringer HC	6	3	0	3	146	153	−7	6	20–23	24–20	—	34–30
(Denmark) Viborg HK	6	0	0	6	143	163	−20	0	27–28	20–26	26–29	—

== Main round ==
The draw of the group matches was held on 20 November at the Gartenhotel Altmannsdorf in Vienna. A total of eight teams were concerned in the process, to be divided into two pots of four. Teams were divided into two pots, based on EHF coefficients. Clubs from the same pot or group could not be drawn into the same group.

=== Seedings ===
Pot 1	Pot 2
(Romania) CS Oltchim Rm. Vâlcea (Hungary) Győri Audi ETO KC (Norway) Larvik HK (Russia) Zvezda Zvenigorod	(Denmark) Randers HK (Slovenia) Krim Ljubljana (Hungary) FTC-Rail Cargo Hungaria (Montenegro) ŽRK Budućnost Podgorica

=== Group 1 ===
Team	Pld	W	D	L	GF	GA	GD	Pts	GKC	LHK	ŽRK	RHK
(Hungary) Győri Audi ETO KC	6	6	0	0	160	122	+38	12	—	30–24	27–17	32–24
(Norway) Larvik HK	6	4	0	2	146	133	+13	8	18–24	—	28–16	25–19
(Montenegro) Budućnost Podgorica	6	1	1	4	116	139	−23	3	21–22	18–20	—	24–22
(Denmark) Randers HK	6	0	1	5	129	157	−28	1	18–25	26–31	20–20	—

=== Group 2 ===
Team	Pld	W	D	L	GF	GA	GD	Pts	RKK	CSV	FTC	ZVE
(Slovenia) Krim Ljubljana	6	4	0	2	161	149	+12	8	—	28–24	31–25	27–23
(Romania) CS Oltchim Rm. Vâlcea	6	4	0	2	154	142	+12	8	23–20	—	22–23	29–25
(Hungary) FTC-Rail Cargo Hungaria	6	3	0	3	163	173	−10	6	30–26	23–30	—	35–34
(Russia) Zvezda Zvenigorod	6	1	0	5	159	173	−14	2	24–29	23–26	30–27	—

== Knockout stage ==
=== Semifinals ===
Team 1	Agg.	Team 2	1st leg	2nd leg
CS Oltchim Rm. Vâlcea (Romania)	47–48	(Hungary) Győri Audi ETO KC	22–24	25–24
Larvik HK (Norway)	49–43	(Slovenia) Krim Ljubljana	22–24	27–19

=== Final ===
Team 1	Agg.	Team 2	1st leg	2nd leg
Larvik HK (Norway)	43–47	(Hungary) Győri Audi ETO KC	21–24	22–23

== Top scorers ==
Rank	Name	Team	Goals
1	Zsuzsanna Tomori (HUN)	(Hungary) Ferencváros	95
2	Katarina Bulatović (MNE)	(Romania) Vâlcea	90
3	Milena Knežević (MNE)	(Montenegro) Budućnost	86
4	Anita Görbicz (HUN)	(Hungary) Győr	79
4	Linn-Kristin Riegelhuth Koren (NOR)	(Norway) Larvik	79
6	Gro Hammerseng (NOR)	(Norway) Larvik	71
7	Heidi Løke (NOR)	(Hungary) Győr	67
7	Lyudmila Postnova (RUS)	(Russia) Zvenigorod	67
9	Camilla Dalby (DEN)	(Denmark) Randers	66
10	Zita Szucsánszki (HUN)	(Hungary) Ferencváros	65

Excluding qualifying rounds
