= 2012–13 EHF Women's Champions League knockout stage =

Sports event

The 2012–13 EHF Women's Champions League knockout stage ran from 6 April to 13 April 2013. The top two placed teams from the main round advanced to the semifinals.

== Semifinals ==
Team 1	Agg.	Team 2	1st leg	2nd leg
CS Oltchim Rm. Vâlcea (Romania)	47–48	(Hungary) Győri Audi ETO KC	22–24	25–24
Larvik HK (Norway)	49–43	(Slovenia) Krim Ljubljana	22–24	27–19

=== First leg ===
6 April 2013; 15:15	Larvik HK (Norway)	22 – 24	(Slovenia) Krim Ljubljana	Arena Larvik, Larvik; Attendance: 2,522; Referees: Brehmer, Skowronek (POL)
6 April 2013; 15:15	Hammerseng 6	(9–16)	Müller 8	Arena Larvik, Larvik; Attendance: 2,522; Referees: Brehmer, Skowronek (POL)
6 April 2013; 15:15	3× (yellow card) 4× (suspension)	Report	3× (yellow card) 7× (suspension)	Arena Larvik, Larvik; Attendance: 2,522; Referees: Brehmer, Skowronek (POL)

6 April 2013; 18:00	CS Oltchim Rm. Vâlcea (Romania)	22 – 24	(Hungary) Győri Audi ETO KC	Polyvalent Hall, Bucharest; Attendance: 5,138; Referees: Geipel, Helbig (GER)
6 April 2013; 18:00	Bulatović 8	(10–14)	Görbicz 8	Polyvalent Hall, Bucharest; Attendance: 5,138; Referees: Geipel, Helbig (GER)
6 April 2013; 18:00	3× (yellow card) 4× (suspension)	Report	3× (yellow card) 6× (suspension)	Polyvalent Hall, Bucharest; Attendance: 5,138; Referees: Geipel, Helbig (GER)

=== Second leg ===
11 April 2013; 19:00	Győri Audi ETO KC (Hungary)	24 – 25	(Romania) CS Oltchim Rm. Vâlcea	Veszprém Aréna, Veszprém; Attendance: 5,019; Referees: Nikolić, Stojković (SRB)
11 April 2013; 19:00	Løke 5	(10–14)	Barbosa, Manea 5	Veszprém Aréna, Veszprém; Attendance: 5,019; Referees: Nikolić, Stojković (SRB)
11 April 2013; 19:00	3× (yellow card) 4× (suspension)	Report	3× (yellow card) 6× (suspension)	Veszprém Aréna, Veszprém; Attendance: 5,019; Referees: Nikolić, Stojković (SRB)

Győri ETO won 48–47 on aggregate.

13 April 2013; 20:30	Krim Ljubljana (Slovenia)	19 – 27	(Norway) Larvik HK	Arena Stožice, Ljubljana; Attendance: 5,000; Referees: Bonaventura, Bonaventura (FRA)
13 April 2013; 20:30	Martín 4	(9–13)	Blanco 7	Arena Stožice, Ljubljana; Attendance: 5,000; Referees: Bonaventura, Bonaventura (FRA)
13 April 2013; 20:30	3× (yellow card) 1× (suspension)	Report	3× (yellow card) 2× (suspension)	Arena Stožice, Ljubljana; Attendance: 5,000; Referees: Bonaventura, Bonaventura (FRA)

Larvik won 49–43 on aggregate.

== Final ==
A draw on 11 April 2013, decided which team had homecourt in the first leg.

Team 1	Agg.	Team 2	1st leg	2nd leg
Larvik HK (Norway)	43–47	(Hungary) Győri Audi ETO KC	21–24	22–23

=== First leg ===
5 May 2013; 16:45	Larvik HK (Norway)	21 – 24	(Hungary) Győri Audi ETO KC	Arena Larvik, Larvik; Attendance: 4,115; Referees: Florescu, Duță (ROU)
5 May 2013; 16:45	Blanco 5	(13–12)	Görbicz 8	Arena Larvik, Larvik; Attendance: 4,115; Referees: Florescu, Duță (ROU)
5 May 2013; 16:45	3× (yellow card) 1× (suspension)	Report	3× (yellow card) 4× (suspension)	Arena Larvik, Larvik; Attendance: 4,115; Referees: Florescu, Duță (ROU)

=== Second leg ===
11 May 2013; 15:15	Győri Audi ETO KC (Hungary)	23 – 22	(Norway) Larvik HK	Veszprém Aréna, Veszprém; Attendance: 5,119; Referees: Gubica, Milošević (CRO)
11 May 2013; 15:15	Løke, Radičević 5	(13–8)	Mørk 5	Veszprém Aréna, Veszprém; Attendance: 5,119; Referees: Gubica, Milošević (CRO)
11 May 2013; 15:15	2× (yellow card)	Report	3× (yellow card) 4× (suspension)	Veszprém Aréna, Veszprém; Attendance: 5,119; Referees: Gubica, Milošević (CRO)
