= Sophie Fasold =

German/American handball player (born 1994)

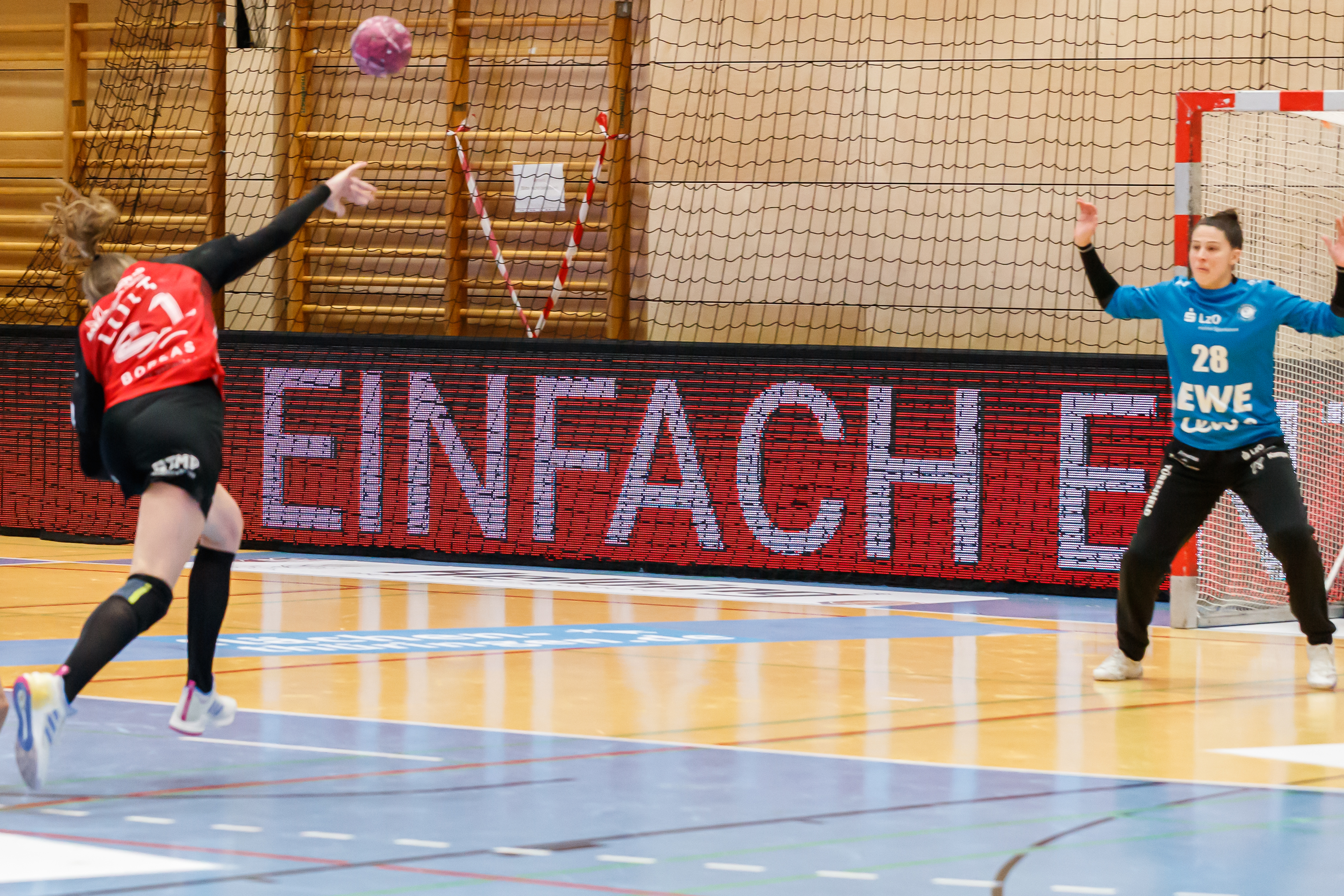
- Fasold (right) in 2023

Personal information
- Nationality: American
- Born: 2 January 1994 (age 32) Munich, Germany
- Height: 174 cm (69 in)

Sport
- Sport: Handball
- Position: Goalkeeper
- Current club: Buxtehuder SV
- Number: 24

Youth career
- Years: Team
- –: TSV Ismaning
- –: Bjerringbro FH
- –: SK Aarhus

Senior clubs
- Years: Team
- 2013-2015: TSV Owschlag
- 2015-2018: HG Owschlag-Kropp-Tetenhusen
- 2018-2022: TSV Nord Harrislee
- 2022-2024: VfL Oldenburg
- 2024-: Buxtehuder SV
National team
- Years: Team
- –: United States
Medal record
Nor.Ca. Championship
Silver medal – second place	2017 Puerto Rico

Sophie Fasold (born 2 January 1994) is a German/American handball player who plays for Buxtehuder SV in Germany. She has also played Handball at the Pan American Games for the American team. For a time she lived in Copperas Cove, Texas with her grandparents.

== Individual Awards and recognitions ==
- 2017 Nor.Ca. Women's Handball Championship: All Star Team Goalkeeper
- 2021 Nor.Ca. Women's Handball Championship: All Star Team Goalkeeper
