= Friederike Lütz =

German handball player (born 1988)

Personal information
- Nationality: German
- Born: 26 March 1988 (age 38) Dortmund
- Height: 1.75 m (5 ft 9 in)

Sport
- Sport: Handball
- Position: Right wing
- Current club: Buxtehuder SV
- Number: 5
National team
Years	Team	Apps	(Gls)
–	Germany	7	(16)
- Updated on 4 December 2012

Friederike Lütz (born 26 March 1988) is a German handball player for Buxtehuder SV and the German national team.
