= Friederike Gubernatis =

German handball player (born 1988)

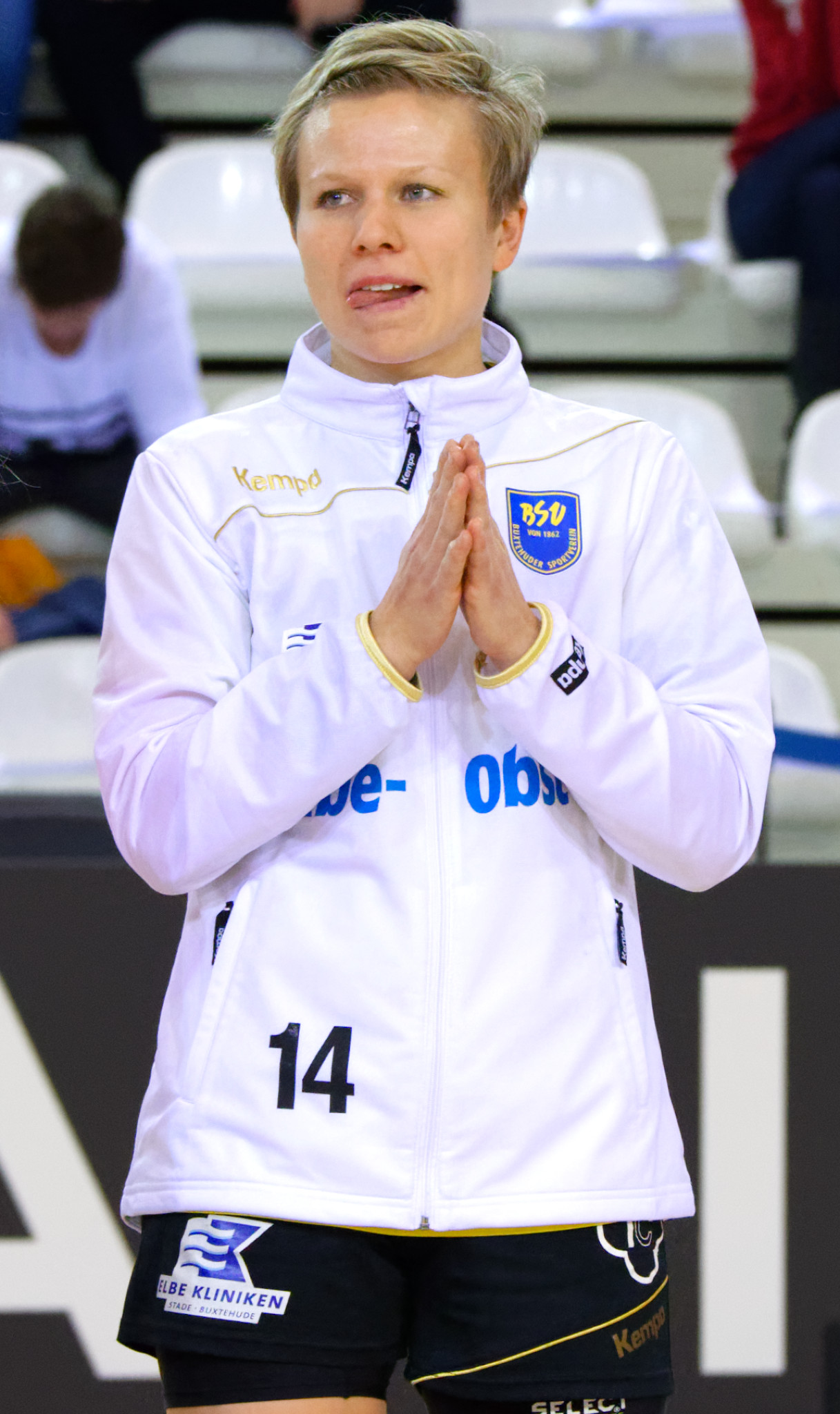

Personal information
- Nationality: German
- Born: 1 April 1988 (age 38) Hamburg, Germany
- Height: 1.77 m (5 ft 10 in)

Sport
- Sport: Handball
- Position: Right back
- Current club: Buxtehuder SV
- Number: 14

Youth career
- Years: Team
- 1993–1997: TuS Esingen
- 1997–2000: HSV Hockenheim
- 2000–2007: TSG Ketsch

Senior clubs
- Years: Team
- 2007–2009: TSG Ketsch
- 2009–2013: Frankfurter HC
- 2013–: Buxtehuder SV
National team
Years	Team	Apps	(Gls)
2009–2017	Germany	21	(34)

Friederike Gubernatis (born 1 April 1988) is a German handball player for Buxtehuder SV.

She was selected as part of the German team for the 2017 World Women's Handball Championship.
