= Lone Fischer =

German handball player (born 1988)

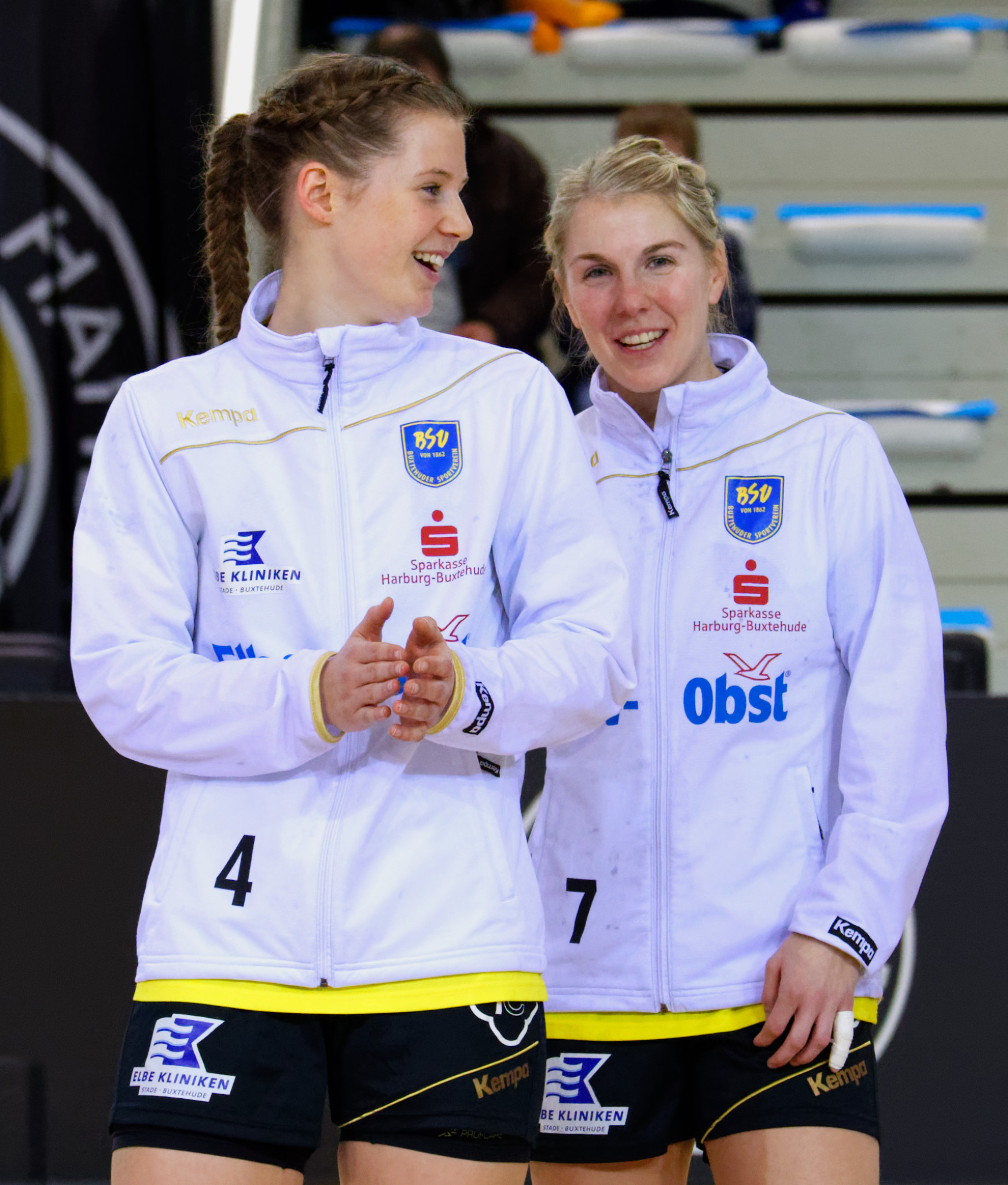
- Fischer (right) in 2015

Personal information
- Nationality: German
- Born: 8 September 1988 (age 38) Eckernförde, West Germany
- Height: 1.65 m (5 ft 5 in)

Sport
- Sport: Handball
- Position: Left back
- Current club: Buxtehuder SV
- Number: 7

Senior clubs
- Years: Team
- –2002: SG HF Schleswig
- 2002–2008: TSV Owschlag
- 2008–: Buxtehuder SV
National team
Years	Team	Apps	(Gls)
2012–2017	Germany	48	(89)

Lone Fischer (born 8 September 1988) is a German handball player for Buxtehuder SV and the Germany national team.
