= Cara Hartstock =

German handball player (born 1994)

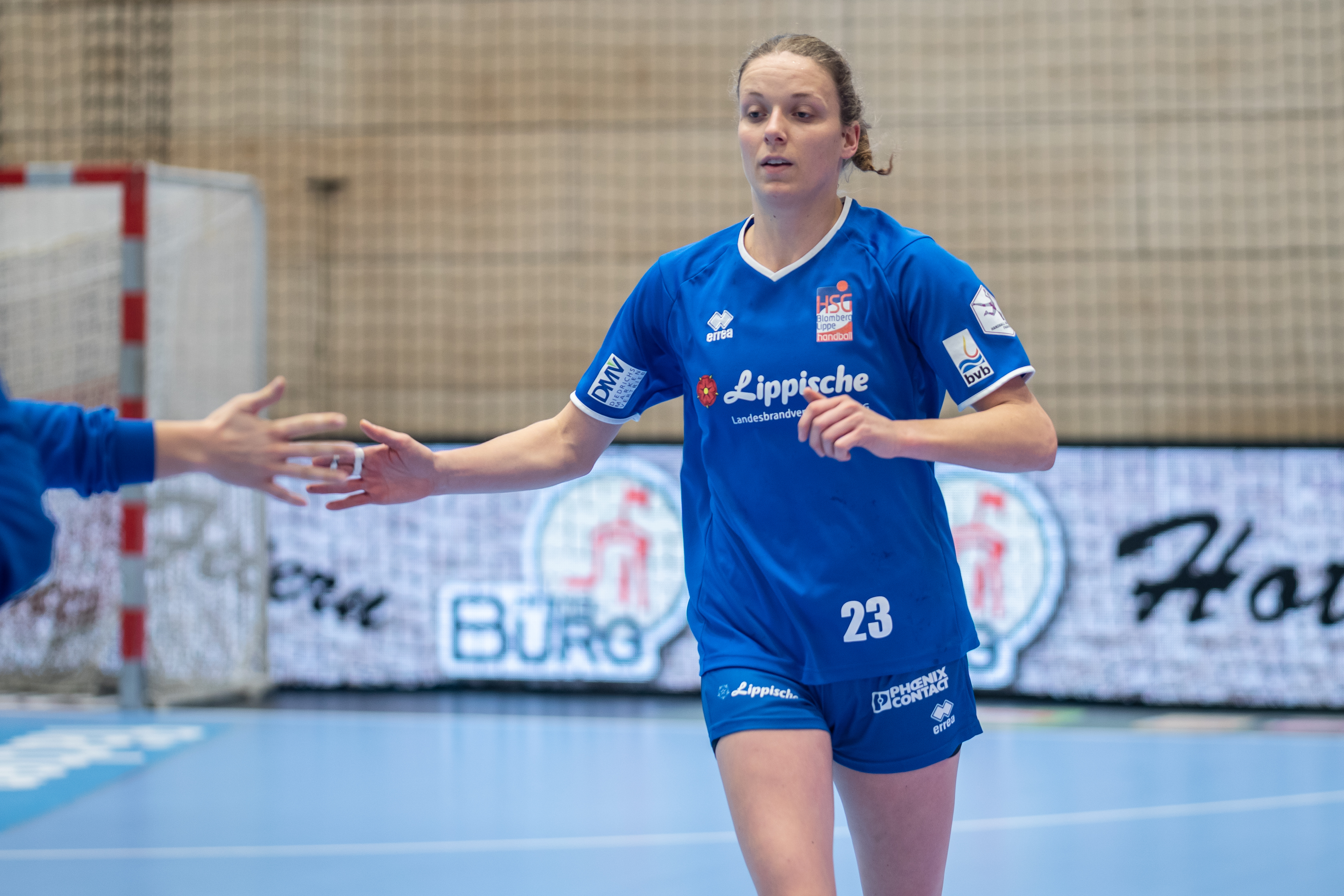
- Hartstock in November 2020

Personal information
- Nationality: German
- Born: 18 March 1994 (age 32) Lübeck, Germany
- Height: 1.81 m (5 ft 11 in)

Sport
- Sport: Handball
- Position: Line player
- Current club: Buxtehuder SV
- Number: 29

Senior clubs
- Years: Team
- 2012–2013: HC Leipzig
- 2013–2014: HL Buchholz 08-Rosengarten
- 2014–2019: VfL Oldenburg
- 2019–2020: TuS Metzingen
- 2020–2022: HSG Blomberg-Lippe
- 2022–2025: Buxtehuder SV

Cara Hartstock (born 18 March 1994) is a German former handball player for Buxtehuder SV in the Frauen Handball-Bundesliga.

Hartstock represented the German junior national team, where she participated at the 2014 Women's Junior World Handball Championship, placing 4th.

In February 2022, she signed a 1-year contract with the Bundesliga club Buxtehuder SV. She has previously played for HSG Blomberg-Lippe, TuS Metzingen, VfL Oldenburg and HC Leipzig.

In 2025, she announced that she will retire in the summer of the same year.

She studied pedagogy at the University of Oldenburg.

Her sister, Sophie, played in the Frauen Handball-Bundesliga for 1. FSV Mainz 05.

== Achievements ==
- Bundesliga:
  - Bronze: 2020
- DHB-Pokal:
  - Winner: 2018
  - Finalist: 2015
