= Naiara Egozkue =

Spanish handball player (born 1983)

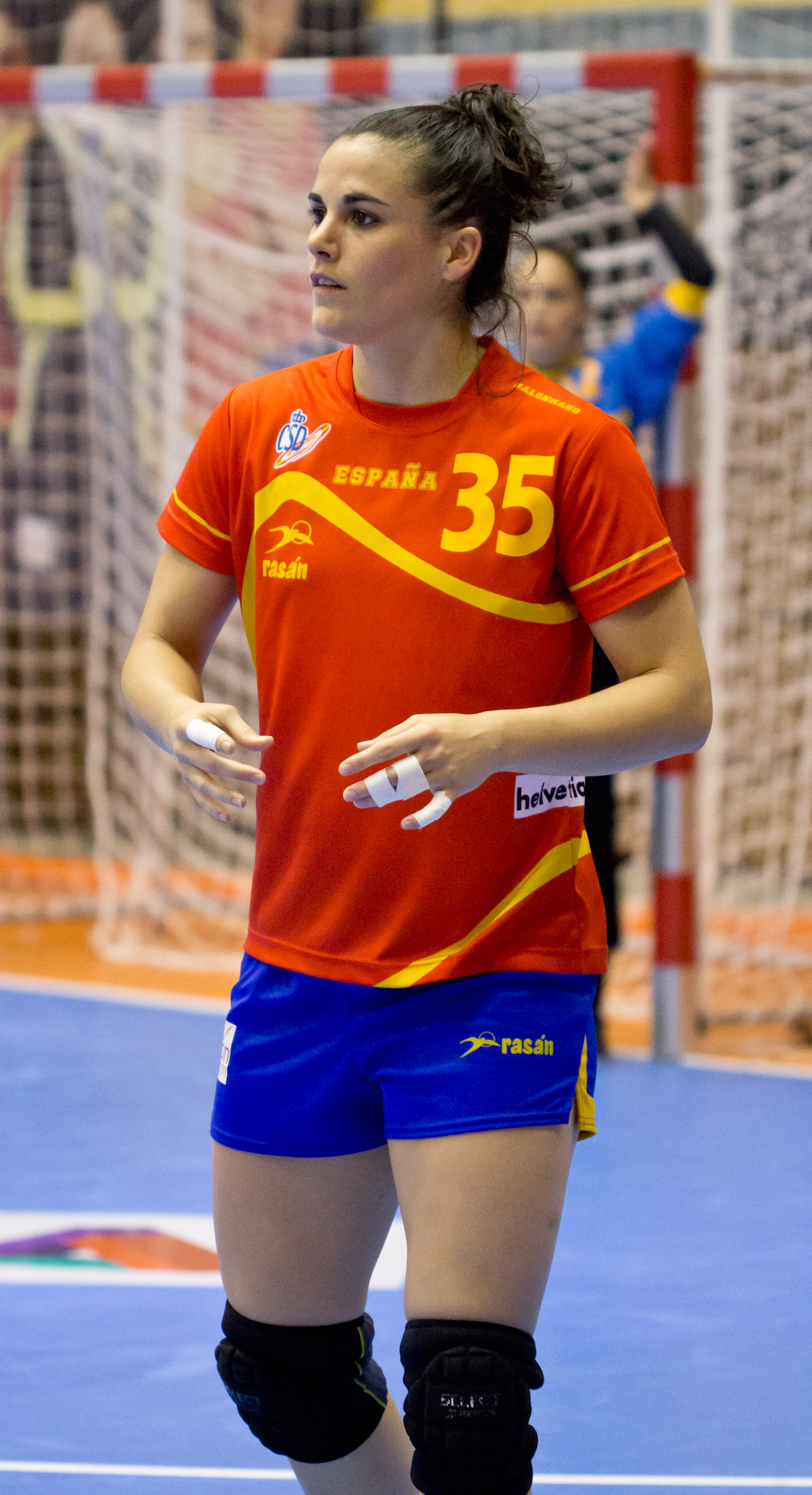
- Egozkue in 2013

Personal information
- Full name: Naiara Egozkue Extremado
- Nationality: Spanish
- Born: 21 October 1983 (age 42) Pamplona, Spain
- Height: 1.73 m (5 ft 8 in)

Sport
- Sport: Handball
- Position: Left wing
- Current club: CB Atlético Guardés
- Number: 5

Senior clubs
- Years: Team
- 2004–2012: SD Itxako
- 2012–2014: Bayer 04 Leverkusen
- 2014–2016: CB Atlético Guardés
- 2016–2017: BM Zuazo
- 2017–: CB Atlético Guardés
National team
Years	Team	Apps	(Gls)
2009–	Spain	75	(99)
Medal record
European Championship
Silver medal – second place	2014 Croatia/Hungary

Naiara Egozkue Extremado (born 21 October 1983) is a Spanish handball player for CB Atlético Guardés and the Spanish national team.

With Spain she won silver medals at 2014 European Championship. She also represented Spain at the 2013 World Women's Handball Championship and 2016 Olympics. In September 2015 she was selected as Player of the Month in the Division de Honor Femenina in Spain.
