= Mihaela Ani Senocico =

Romanian handball player (born 1981)

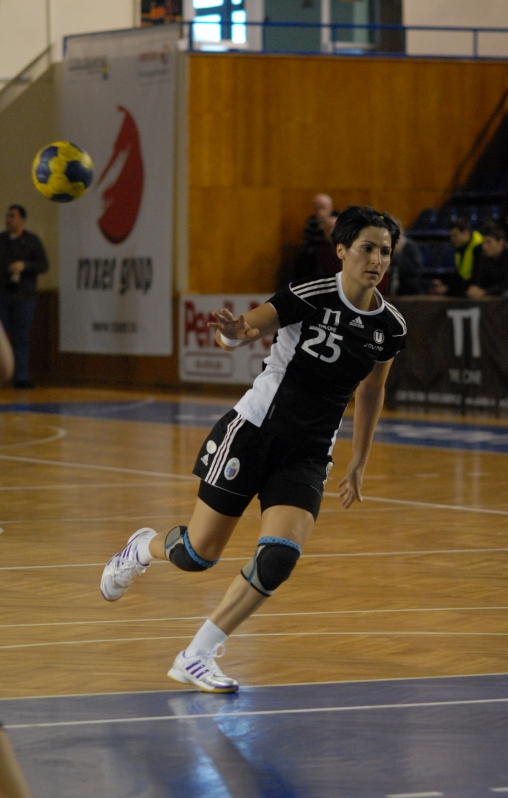

Personal information
- Nationality: Romanian
- Born: 14 December 1981 (age 44) Bistrița, Romania
- Height: 1.74 m (5 ft 9 in)

Sport
- Sport: Handball
- Position: Centre back
- Current club: CS Universitatea Cluj-Napoca
- Number: 25
National team
Years	Team	Apps	(Gls)
2001-2012	Romania	66	(109)

Mihaela Ani Senocico (born 1981) is a Romanian handball player, who plays for CS Universitatea Cluj-Napoca.

With the Romanian national team she participated at the 2008 Summer Olympics in Beijing, where the Romanian team placed seventh.
