= Zsuzsanna Tomori =

Hungarian handball player (born 1987)

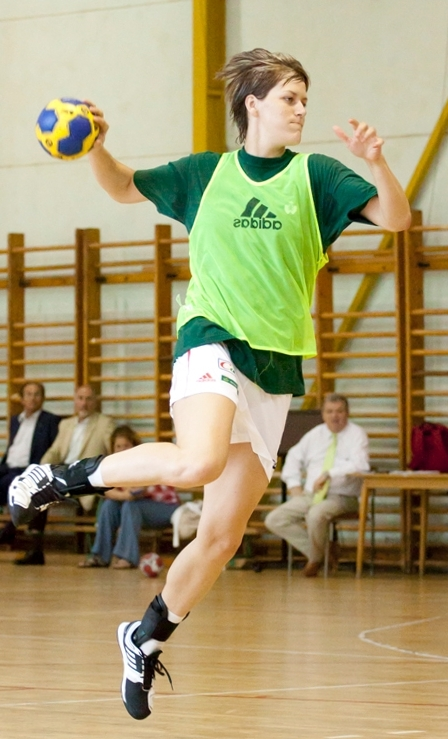
- Zsuzsanna Tomori in 2011

Personal information
- Nationality: Hungarian
- Born: 18 June 1987 (age 39) Budapest, Hungary
- Height: 1.87 m (6 ft 2 in)

Sport
- Sport: Handball
- Position: Left back
- Current club: (Hungary) Ferencvárosi TC
- Number: 23

Youth career
- Years: Team
- –2004: (Hungary) Dunaújváros

Senior clubs
- Years: Team
- 2004–2007: (Hungary) Vasas SC
- 2007–2010: (Hungary) Győri ETO KC
- 2010–2015: (Hungary) Ferencvárosi TC
- 2015–2019: (Hungary) Győri ETO KC
- 2019–2021: (Hungary) Siófok KC
- 2021–2022: (Norway) Vipers Kristiansand
- 2022–2025: (Hungary) Ferencvárosi TC
National team
Years	Team	Apps	(Gls)
2006–	Hungary	191	(467)
Medal record
European Championship
Bronze medal – third place	2012 Serbia

Zsuzsanna Tomori (Hungarian: [ˈʒuʒɒnnɒ ˈtomori]; born 18 June 1987) is a Hungarian handballer for Ferencvárosi TC and the Hungarian national team.

== Career ==
=== Club ===
Tomori started to play handball at the age of 12 and signed her first professional contract with Vasas SC in 2004. Considered one of the best players of her position in the Nemzeti Bajnokság I, she moved to league champions Győri ETO KC in 2007. After spent two successful seasons at the club, winning the league and finishing runner-up in the Champions League, in March 2010 dressing room troubles were revealed. As a result, first the Hungarian international was exiled to the reserve team, and after the sides could not find an appropriate solution, she left the club by mutual agreement.

After she became a free agent, she joined Ferencvárosi TC. She spent five seasons with them, when she got an offer from her former club Győri ETO and signed a contract with them.

In March 2019 she decided not to extend her contract with Győr and signed a deal with Siófok. About her decision, she said: "Győr wanted to keep me, but they offered only a one-year contract, meanwhile Siófok gave me a 3-year offer, and this was decisive at the end because my goal is to have a secure and stable future."

In 2021 she decided to terminate her contract with Siófok and try herself out abroad for the first time in her career, signing a 1-year contract with Vipers Kristiansand. After the contract expired, she decided to move back to Hungary, and signed with her former club, FTC.

=== International ===
She debuted in the national team on 4 April 2006 against Norway. Her first major tournament was the World Championship in 2007, which was followed by the European Championship and the Olympic Games one year later. She was also present on the World Championship in 2009, 2013, 2015, 2019, on the European Championship in 2010, 2012, 2014, 2020 and at the Olympics in 2008, 2020.

=== Injuries ===
Tomori got injured seriously for the first time in December 2015 at the World Championship during the match against Poland. The diagnosis was anterior cruciate ligament tear and a partial lateral ligament injury. She was out for eight months and returned to handball in autumn 2016. During a training in October she felt that her operated knee hurts, the doctors after an examination decided that one more surgery is needed. Tomori recovered from this surgery for January 2017. After the 2016–17 season another operation was needed, because of a cyst that has emerged at the location of the screw exception. She recovered in time and was able to start the preparations with her team, Győri ETO. In October 2017 during a 2018 EURO qualification match against Belarus she has suffered a knee cartilage injury, which required an arthroscopic procedure. Her recovery was successful and she returned to the court in January 2018. In March 2018, during a match against The Netherlands she twisted her other knee and suffered a rupture in her anterior cruciate ligament. She began playing again in January 2019, after 9 months of successful rehabilitation.

== Achievements ==
- EHF Champions League:
  - Winner: 2017, 2018, 2019, 2022
  - Finalist: 2009, 2016, 2023
  - Semifinalist: 2008
- EHF Cup Winners' Cup:
  - Winner: 2011, 2012
- Nemzeti Bajnokság I:
  - Winner: 2008, 2009, 2015, 2016, 2017, 2018, 2019
- Magyar Kupa:
  - Winner: 2008, 2009, 2010, 2016, 2018, 2019, 2023, 2024, 2025
- Eliteserien:
  - Winner: 2022
- Norwegian Cup:
  - Winner: 2021
- European Championship:
  - Bronze Medalist: 2012

== Individual awards ==
- Hungarian Handballer of the Year: 2012, 2015, 2016
- EHF Champions League Top Scorer: 2013
- Team of the Tournament Left Back of the Baia Mare Champions Trophy: 2014
- Best Defender of the EHF Champions League: 2018
