= Gitte Andersen (handballer) =

Danish handball player

Personal information
- Full name: Gitte Evendorff Andersen
- Nationality: Danish
- Born: 21 July 1989 (age 37) Randers, Denmark
- Height: 1.70 m (5 ft 7 in)

Sport
- Sport: Handball
- Position: Right wing

Senior clubs
- Years: Team
- 2007-2018: Randers HK
National team
Years	Team	Apps	(Gls)
2008-2014	Denmark	13	(16)

Teams managed
- 2018-2019: Hadsten Håndbold (ass. coach)
Medal record
IHF Junior World Championship
Silver medal – second place	2008 Macedonia

Gitte Andersen (born 21 July 1989) is a Danish former handball player and currently assistant coach for Hadsten Håndbold. She played her entire career for Randers HK, where she played 284 matches, scoring 624 goals.
