= Lýdia Jakubisová =

Slovak handball player (born 1981)

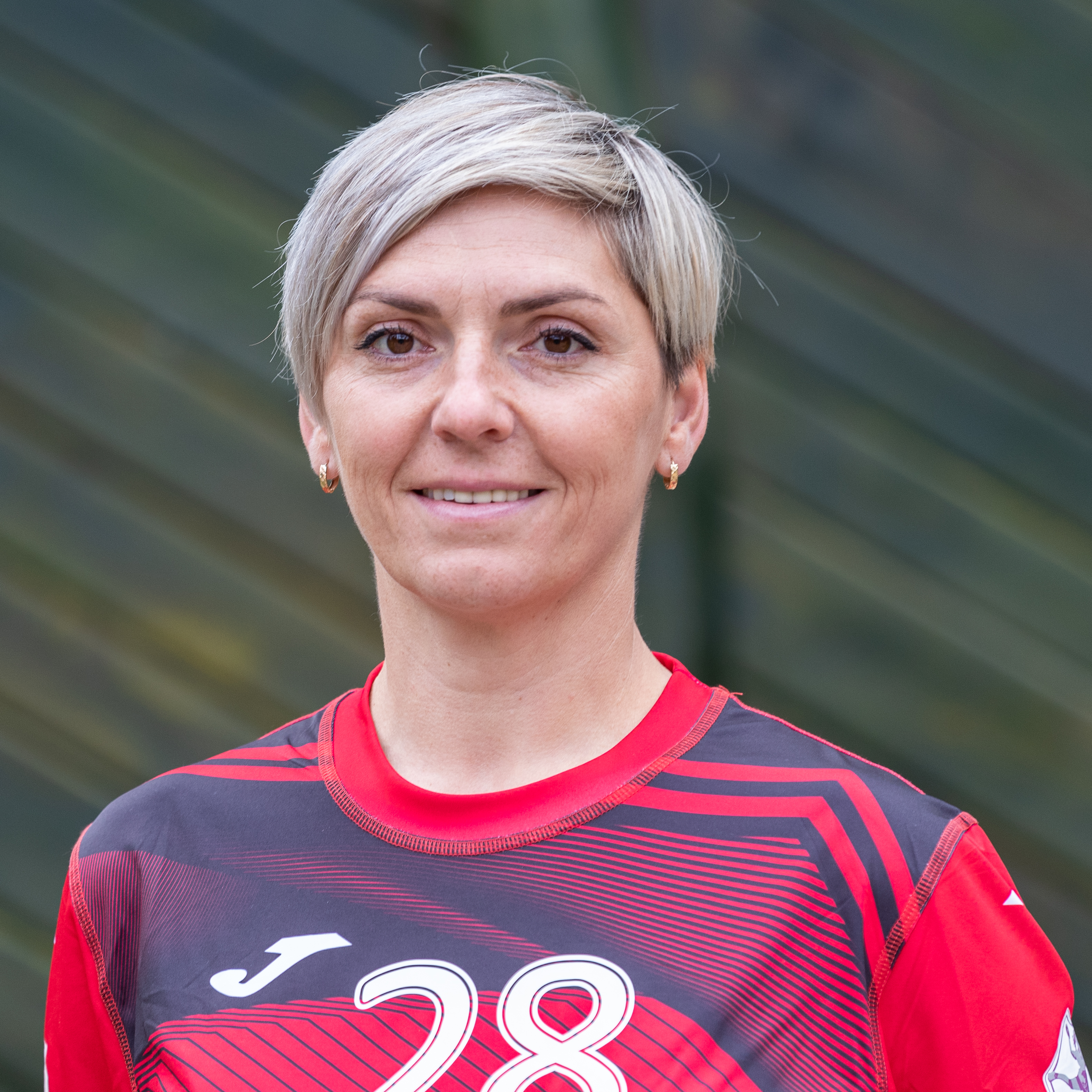

Personal information
- Nationality: Slovak
- Born: 14 October 1981 (age 45) Bojnice, Czechoslovakia
- Height: 1.69 m (5 ft 7 in)

Sport
- Sport: Handball
- Position: Right wing
- Current club: Thüringer HC
- Number: 28
National team
Years	Team	Apps	(Gls)
–	Slovakia	125	(466)
- Updated on 13 September 2024

Lýdia Jakubisová (born 14 October 1981) is a Slovak handball player and coach for Thüringer HC and the Slovak national team.
