= Buxtehuder SV =

German sports club

- Full name: Buxtehuder Sportverein von 1862 e.V.
- Founded: August 4, 1862; 163 years ago
- Arena: Schulzentrum Nord
- Capacity: 2,000
- Head coach: Dirk Leun
- League: Handball-Bundesliga
- 2025–26: 7th
- Club colours
Home	Away

Location of Buxtehuder SV

Buxtehuder SV is a German sports club based in Buxtehude, Lower Saxony. The club is best known for its women's handball team, currently competing in the Handball-Bundesliga Frauen and 2022–23 Women's EHF European League, but also has departments for many other sports, including association football, athletics, swimming, boxing, gymnastics, and volleyball.

== Honours ==
- Handball-Bundesliga Frauen:
  - Silver (3): 2003, 2012, 2015
  - Bronze (6): 2001, 2009, 2011, 2014, 2018, 2022
- DHB-Pokal:
  - Winner (2): 2015, 2017
- EHF Challenge Cup:
  - Winners (1): 2010
  - Finalist (1): 2002

== Crest, colours, supporters ==
=== Kits ===
HOME
2012–13	2014–15

AWAY

2012–13

== Squad ==
=== Current squad ===
Squad for the 2024–25 season.

Goalkeepers

- 1 (Germany) Laura Kuske
- 20 (Germany) Ylva-Elin Tants
- 24 (United States) Sophie Fasold

Wingers
LW

- 19 (Germany) Cara Reiche
- 28 (Germany) Teresa von Prittwitz

RW

- 5 (Germany) Maj Nielsen
- 7 (Germany) Lotta Heider

PV

- 4 (Germany) Larissa Kroepler
- 23 (Germany) Cara Hartstock
- 45 (Germany) Jolina Hohnstock

Back players
LB

- 17 (Switzerland) Charlotte Kähr
- 51 (Germany) Lin Elisabeth Lück

CB

- 10 (Germany) Anika Hampel
- 14 (Germany) Maja Schönefeld
- 29 (Germany) Lucy Saul
- 32 (Netherlands) Isa Ternede

RB

- 11 (Germany) Isabelle Dölle
- 22 (Germany) Levke Kretschmann

=== Staff members ===
- (Germany) Head Coach: Dirk Leun
- (Germany) Assistant Coach: Adrian Fuladjusch
- (Netherlands) Goalkeeping Coach: Debbie Klijn

=== Transfers ===
Transfers for the 2025-26 season.

Joining

- (Netherlands) Fleur Schouten (LB) (from (Netherlands) Westfriesland SEW)
- (Germany) Lucy Strauchmann (PV) (from (Germany) SV Union Halle-Neustadt)
- (Netherlands) Nicki van der Vorst (LB) (from (Netherlands) VOC Amsterdam)
- (Germany) Nele Franz (CB) (from (Germany) TuS Metzingen)
- (Germany) Ruslana Litvinov (CB) (from (Germany) HSG Blomberg-Lippe)

Leaving

- (Germany) Jolina Hohnstock (PV) (to (Germany) Thüringer HC)
- (Germany) Levke Kretschmann (LB) (to (Germany) Thüringer HC)
- (Germany) Teresa von Prittwitz (LW) (to (Germany) Thüringer HC)
- (Germany) Annie Linder (GK) (to (Germany) Neckarsulmer SU)
- (Germany) Isabelle Dölle (RB) (retires)

== Notable players ==
- (Denmark) Camilla Andersen
- (Germany) Heike Axmann
- (Germany) Andrea Bölk
- (Germany) Emily Bölk
- (Germany) Isabell Klein
- (Netherlands) Debbie Klijn
- (Germany) Christine Lindemann
- (Germany) Stefanie Melbeck
- (Germany) Suzanne Petersen
- (Germany) Melanie Schliecker
- (Germany) Heike Schmidt
- (Netherlands) Michelle Goos
- (Germany) Friederike Gubernatis
- (Netherlands) Jasmina Janković
- (Netherlands) Willemijn Karsten
- (Netherlands) Diane Lamein
- (Sweden) Ulrika Toft Hansen
