= 2023–24 Women's EHF European League group stage =

European handball tournament

Tournament information
- Sport: Handball
- Date: 6 January – 18 February 2024
- Teams: 16 (from 9 countries)
- Website: ehfel.com

The 2023–24 Women's EHF European League group stage was played between 6 January and 18 February 2024 to determine the eight teams advancing to the knockout stage of the 2023–24 Women's EHF European League.

== Draw ==
The draw took place on the 23 November 2023 at 11:00 CET in Vienna, Austria. The only restriction was that clubs from the same country cannot be in the same group. Bold indicates who advanced to the knockout stage.

=== Seeding ===
Pot 1	Pot 2	Pot 3	Pot 4
(Denmark) Nykøbing Falster Håndbold (Germany) **Thüringer HC** (Hungary) **Motherson Mosonmagyaróvár** (Romania) **CS Gloria Bistrița**	(Spain) Costa del Sol Malaga (France) **Neptunes de Nantes** (Hungary) Praktiker-Vác (Romania) **HC Dunărea Brăila**	(Croatia) RK Lokomotiva Zagreb (Norway) **Storhamar Håndball Elite** (Poland) MKS FunFloor Perła Lublin (Romania) CSM Târgu Jiu	(Croatia) **Podravka Vegeta** (France) Chambray Touraine HB (Germany) HSG Bensheim-Auerbach (Norway) **Sola HK**

== Format ==
In each group, teams played against each other in a double round-robin format, with home and away matches.

== Tiebreakers ==
In the group stage, teams were ranked according to points (2 points for a win, 1 point for a draw, 0 points for a loss), and if tied on points, the following tiebreaking criteria were applied, in the order given, to determine the rankings:

1. Points in matches among tied teams;
2. Goal difference in matches among tied teams;
3. Goal difference in all group matches;
4. Goals scored in all group matches;
5. If more than two teams were tied, and after applying all head-to-head criteria above, a subset of teams were still tied, all head-to-head criteria above were reapplied exclusively to this subset of teams;
6. Drawing lots.

== Groups ==
=== Group A ===
Pos	Team	Pld	W	D	L	GF	GA	GD	Pts	Qualification	STO	POD	NFH	VAC
1	(Norway) Storhamar Håndball Elite	6	5	0	1	169	138	+31	**10**	Quarterfinals	—	31–22	27–26	35–17
2	(Croatia) Podravka Vegeta	6	3	1	2	147	148	−1	**7**	Quarterfinals	23–19	—	25–23	27–24
3	(Denmark) Nykøbing Falster Håndbold	6	2	0	4	154	155	−1	**4**		26–27	23–22	—	32–27
4	(Hungary) Praktiker-Vác	6	1	1	4	147	176	−29	**3**		24–33	28–28	27–24	—

Source: EHF

6 January 2024; 18:00	**Nykøbing Falster Håndbold (Denmark)**	**26–27**	**(Norway) Storhamar Håndball Elite**	Spar Nord Arena, Nykøbing; Attendance: 1,678; Referees: Fabryczny, Rawicki (POL)
6 January 2024; 18:00	Bardrum 10	(10–12)	Toft 5	Spar Nord Arena, Nykøbing; Attendance: 1,678; Referees: Fabryczny, Rawicki (POL)
6 January 2024; 18:00	1× (suspension) 1× (red card)	Report	3× (suspension) 1× (red card)	Spar Nord Arena, Nykøbing; Attendance: 1,678; Referees: Fabryczny, Rawicki (POL)

7 January 2024; 18:00	**Praktiker-Vác (Hungary)**	**28–28**	**(Croatia) Podravka Vegeta**	Vác Városi Sportcsarnok, Vác; Attendance: 600; Referees: Jerlecki, Łabuń (POL)
7 January 2024; 18:00	Barišić 9	(12–13)	Helembai, Kuczora 7	Vác Városi Sportcsarnok, Vác; Attendance: 600; Referees: Jerlecki, Łabuń (POL)
7 January 2024; 18:00	5× (suspension)	Report	1× (yellow card) 8× (suspension) 1× (red card)	Vác Városi Sportcsarnok, Vác; Attendance: 600; Referees: Jerlecki, Łabuń (POL)

14 January 2024; 14:00	**Storhamar Håndball Elite (Norway)**	**35–17**	**(Hungary) Praktiker-Vác**	Boligpartner Arena, Hamar; Attendance: 901; Referees: Schaad, Müller (SUI)
14 January 2024; 14:00	Löfqvist 7	(16–10)	Marincsák 6	Boligpartner Arena, Hamar; Attendance: 901; Referees: Schaad, Müller (SUI)
14 January 2024; 14:00	1× (yellow card) 2× (suspension)	Report	2× (suspension)	Boligpartner Arena, Hamar; Attendance: 901; Referees: Schaad, Müller (SUI)

14 January 2024; 16:00	**Podravka Vegeta (Croatia)**	**25–23**	**(Denmark) Nykøbing Falster Håndbold**	ŠSD "Josip Samaržija-Bepo", Koprivnica; Attendance: 1,800; Referees: Tzaferopoulos, Bethmann (GRE)
14 January 2024; 16:00	Mamić 8	(12–6)	M. Obaidli 5	ŠSD "Josip Samaržija-Bepo", Koprivnica; Attendance: 1,800; Referees: Tzaferopoulos, Bethmann (GRE)
14 January 2024; 16:00	2× (yellow card) 5× (suspension)	Report	2× (yellow card) 4× (suspension)	ŠSD "Josip Samaržija-Bepo", Koprivnica; Attendance: 1,800; Referees: Tzaferopoulos, Bethmann (GRE)

20 January 2024; 14:00	**Podravka Vegeta (Croatia)**	**23–19**	**(Norway) Storhamar Håndball Elite**	ŠSD "Josip Samaržija-Bepo", Koprivnica; Attendance: 200; Referees: Geraets, Geraets (NED)
20 January 2024; 14:00	Mamić 5	(13–9)	A. Obaidli 6	ŠSD "Josip Samaržija-Bepo", Koprivnica; Attendance: 200; Referees: Geraets, Geraets (NED)
20 January 2024; 14:00	3× (suspension)	Report	1× (yellow card) 1× (suspension)	ŠSD "Josip Samaržija-Bepo", Koprivnica; Attendance: 200; Referees: Geraets, Geraets (NED)

21 January 2024; 14:00	**Praktiker-Vác (Hungary)**	**27–24**	**(Denmark) Nykøbing Falster Håndbold**	Vác Városi Sportcsarnok, Vác; Attendance: 600; Referees: Pîrvu, Potîrniche (ROU)
21 January 2024; 14:00	Kuczora 11	(13–11)	Madsen 7	Vác Városi Sportcsarnok, Vác; Attendance: 600; Referees: Pîrvu, Potîrniche (ROU)
21 January 2024; 14:00	1× (yellow card) 3× (suspension)	Report	1× (suspension)	Vác Városi Sportcsarnok, Vác; Attendance: 600; Referees: Pîrvu, Potîrniche (ROU)

4 February 2024; 16:00	**Storhamar Håndball Elite (Norway)**	**31–22**	**(Croatia) Podravka Vegeta**	Boligpartner Arena, Hamar; Attendance: 1,434; Referees: Picard, Vauchez (FRA)
4 February 2024; 16:00	A. Obaidli 8	(19–11)	Pandža 5	Boligpartner Arena, Hamar; Attendance: 1,434; Referees: Picard, Vauchez (FRA)
4 February 2024; 16:00	1× (yellow card) 7× (suspension) 1× (red card)	Report	6× (suspension) 1× (red card)	Boligpartner Arena, Hamar; Attendance: 1,434; Referees: Picard, Vauchez (FRA)

4 February 2024; 18:00	**Nykøbing Falster Håndbold (Denmark)**	**32–27**	**(Hungary) Praktiker-Vác**	Spar Nord Arena, Nykøbing; Attendance: 1,189; Referees: Rauchs, Linster (LUX)
4 February 2024; 18:00	Wulff 6	(17–15)	Csíkos 8	Spar Nord Arena, Nykøbing; Attendance: 1,189; Referees: Rauchs, Linster (LUX)
4 February 2024; 18:00	3× (suspension)	Report	4× (suspension)	Spar Nord Arena, Nykøbing; Attendance: 1,189; Referees: Rauchs, Linster (LUX)

11 February 2024; 14:00	**Podravka Vegeta (Croatia)**	**27–24**	**(Hungary) Praktiker-Vác**	ŠSD "Josip Samaržija-Bepo", Koprivnica; Attendance: 1,400; Referees: Radčenko, Pērsis (LAT)
11 February 2024; 14:00	Pandža 7	(13–9)	Kuczora 10	ŠSD "Josip Samaržija-Bepo", Koprivnica; Attendance: 1,400; Referees: Radčenko, Pērsis (LAT)
11 February 2024; 14:00	1× (yellow card) 4× (suspension)	Report	1× (yellow card) 4× (suspension)	ŠSD "Josip Samaržija-Bepo", Koprivnica; Attendance: 1,400; Referees: Radčenko, Pērsis (LAT)

11 February 2024; 16:00	**Storhamar Håndball Elite (Norway)**	**27–26**	**(Denmark) Nykøbing Falster Håndbold**	Boligpartner Arena, Hamar; Attendance: 1,108; Referees: Pétursson, Þrastarson (ISL)
11 February 2024; 16:00	Rivas Toft 6	(15–15)	Nolsøe, M. Obaidli, Schmidt 4	Boligpartner Arena, Hamar; Attendance: 1,108; Referees: Pétursson, Þrastarson (ISL)
11 February 2024; 16:00	1× (yellow card) 1× (suspension)	Report	1× (yellow card) 4× (suspension)	Boligpartner Arena, Hamar; Attendance: 1,108; Referees: Pétursson, Þrastarson (ISL)

17 February 2024; 16:00	**Nykøbing Falster Håndbold (Denmark)**	**23–22**	**(Croatia) Podravka Vegeta**	Spar Nord Arena, Nykøbing; Attendance: 1,050; Referees: Iovcev, Ioncev (BUL)
17 February 2024; 16:00	Bardrum 5	(12–9)	Pandža 6	Spar Nord Arena, Nykøbing; Attendance: 1,050; Referees: Iovcev, Ioncev (BUL)
17 February 2024; 16:00	1× (yellow card) 3× (suspension)	Report	1× (yellow card) 4× (suspension)	Spar Nord Arena, Nykøbing; Attendance: 1,050; Referees: Iovcev, Ioncev (BUL)

18 February 2024; 14:00	**Praktiker-Vác (Hungary)**	**24–30**	**(Norway) Storhamar Håndball Elite**	Vác Városi Sportcsarnok, Vác; Attendance: 500; Referees: Jović, Arnautović (BIH)
18 February 2024; 14:00	Kuczora 6	(13–15)	A. Obaidli 8	Vác Városi Sportcsarnok, Vác; Attendance: 500; Referees: Jović, Arnautović (BIH)
18 February 2024; 14:00	3× (suspension)	Report	1× (yellow card) 1× (suspension)	Vác Városi Sportcsarnok, Vác; Attendance: 500; Referees: Jović, Arnautović (BIH)

=== Group B ===
Pos	Team	Pld	W	D	L	GF	GA	GD	Pts	Qualification	DUN	THC	CHA	LOK
1	(Romania) HC Dunărea Brăila	6	5	0	1	176	150	+26	**10 (Note: HC Dunărea Brăila 61–55 Thüringer HC)**	Quarterfinals	—	33–23	27–21	34–26
2	(Germany) Thüringer HC	6	5	0	1	173	146	+27	**10**	Quarterfinals	32–28	—	29–22	29–17
3	(France) Chambray Touraine HB	6	2	0	4	143	159	−16	**4**		19–24	25–32	—	27–25
4	(Croatia) RK Lokomotiva Zagreb	6	0	0	6	140	177	−37	**0**		29–30	21–28	22–29	—

Source: EHF
Notes:

6 January 2024; 16:00	**RK Lokomotiva Zagreb (Croatia)**	**21–28**	**(Germany) Thüringer HC**	Sportska dvorana Sutinska vrela, Zagreb; Attendance: 500; Referees: Marton, Dáné (HUN)
6 January 2024; 16:00	Dramac 5	(13–13)	Pichlmeier, Reichert 7	Sportska dvorana Sutinska vrela, Zagreb; Attendance: 500; Referees: Marton, Dáné (HUN)
6 January 2024; 16:00	4× (suspension)	Report	6× (suspension)	Sportska dvorana Sutinska vrela, Zagreb; Attendance: 500; Referees: Marton, Dáné (HUN)

7 January 2024; 15:00	**HC Dunărea Brăila (Romania)**	**27–21**	**(France) Chambray Touraine HB**	Romeo Iamandi Sports Hall, Buzău; Attendance: 1,200; Referees: Borge, Nygren (NOR)
7 January 2024; 15:00	Kanaval 6	(11–11)	Stojiljković, Van der Heijden 4	Romeo Iamandi Sports Hall, Buzău; Attendance: 1,200; Referees: Borge, Nygren (NOR)
7 January 2024; 15:00	2× (suspension)	Report	2× (suspension)	Romeo Iamandi Sports Hall, Buzău; Attendance: 1,200; Referees: Borge, Nygren (NOR)

13 January 2024; 18:00	**Chambray Touraine HB (France)**	**27–25**	**(Croatia) RK Lokomotiva Zagreb**	Gymnase de la Fontaine Blanche, Chambray-lès-Tours; Attendance: 200; Referees: Panayides, Andreou (CYP)
13 January 2024; 18:00	Van der Heijden 6	(13–11)	Sedloska 6	Gymnase de la Fontaine Blanche, Chambray-lès-Tours; Attendance: 200; Referees: Panayides, Andreou (CYP)
13 January 2024; 18:00	3× (suspension)	Report	3× (yellow card) 3× (suspension)	Gymnase de la Fontaine Blanche, Chambray-lès-Tours; Attendance: 200; Referees: Panayides, Andreou (CYP)

13 January 2024; 18:00	**Thüringer HC (Germany)**	**32–28**	**(Romania) HC Dunărea Brăila**	Salza-Halle, Bad Langensalza; Attendance: 1,300; Referees: (Netherlands) Schols, (Belgium) Martens
13 January 2024; 18:00	Reichert 13	(16–11)	González 6	Salza-Halle, Bad Langensalza; Attendance: 1,300; Referees: (Netherlands) Schols, (Belgium) Martens
13 January 2024; 18:00	1× (yellow card) 3× (suspension) 1× (red card)	Report	1× (yellow card) 3× (suspension)	Salza-Halle, Bad Langensalza; Attendance: 1,300; Referees: (Netherlands) Schols, (Belgium) Martens

21 January 2024; 16:00	**Chambray Touraine HB (France)**	**25–32**	**(Germany) Thüringer HC**	Gymnase de la Fontaine Blanche, Chambray-lès-Tours; Attendance: 800; Referees: Kinnari, Skogberg (FIN)
21 January 2024; 16:00	Modenel 9	(16–15)	Lott 9	Gymnase de la Fontaine Blanche, Chambray-lès-Tours; Attendance: 800; Referees: Kinnari, Skogberg (FIN)
21 January 2024; 16:00	7× (suspension) 1× (red card)	Report	1× (yellow card) 4× (suspension)	Gymnase de la Fontaine Blanche, Chambray-lès-Tours; Attendance: 800; Referees: Kinnari, Skogberg (FIN)

21 January 2024; 18:00	**RK Lokomotiva Zagreb (Croatia)**	**29–30**	**(Romania) HC Dunărea Brăila**	Sportska dvorana Sutinska vrela, Zagreb; Attendance: 350; Referees: Hansen, Jensen (DEN)
21 January 2024; 18:00	Prkačin 6	(16–16)	Živković 8	Sportska dvorana Sutinska vrela, Zagreb; Attendance: 350; Referees: Hansen, Jensen (DEN)
21 January 2024; 18:00	1× (yellow card) 2× (suspension)	Report	3× (suspension)	Sportska dvorana Sutinska vrela, Zagreb; Attendance: 350; Referees: Hansen, Jensen (DEN)

3 February 2024; 18:00	**Thüringer HC (Germany)**	**29–22**	**(France) Chambray Touraine HB**	Salza-Halle, Bad Langensalza; Attendance: 1,150; Referees: Watson, Welin (SWE)
3 February 2024; 18:00	Reichert 11	(14–9)	Mielke-Offendal, Van der Heijden 4	Salza-Halle, Bad Langensalza; Attendance: 1,150; Referees: Watson, Welin (SWE)
3 February 2024; 18:00	4× (suspension)	Report	4× (suspension)	Salza-Halle, Bad Langensalza; Attendance: 1,150; Referees: Watson, Welin (SWE)

4 February 2024; 15:00	**HC Dunărea Brăila (Romania)**	**34–26**	**(Croatia) RK Lokomotiva Zagreb**	Romeo Iamandi Sports Hall, Buzău; Attendance: 1,200; Referees: Fotakidis, Kinatzidis (GRE)
4 February 2024; 15:00	Liščević 7	(19–15)	Dramac 8	Romeo Iamandi Sports Hall, Buzău; Attendance: 1,200; Referees: Fotakidis, Kinatzidis (GRE)
4 February 2024; 15:00	2× (suspension)	Report	5× (suspension)	Romeo Iamandi Sports Hall, Buzău; Attendance: 1,200; Referees: Fotakidis, Kinatzidis (GRE)

10 February 2024; 18:00	**RK Lokomotiva Zagreb (Croatia)**	**22–29**	**(France) Chambray Touraine HB**	Sportska dvorana Sutinska vrela, Zagreb; Attendance: 200; Referees: Simone, Monitillo
10 February 2024; 18:00	Dramac 4	(11–12)	Puleri 7	Sportska dvorana Sutinska vrela, Zagreb; Attendance: 200; Referees: Simone, Monitillo
10 February 2024; 18:00	2× (suspension)	Report	5× (suspension)	Sportska dvorana Sutinska vrela, Zagreb; Attendance: 200; Referees: Simone, Monitillo

10 February 2024; 19:00	**HC Dunărea Brăila (Romania)**	**33–23**	**(Germany) Thüringer HC**	Romeo Iamandi Sports Hall, Buzău; Attendance: 1,580; Referees: Fahner, Kubis (POL)
10 February 2024; 19:00	Ježić, Da Rocha 6	(16–12)	Stockschläder 5	Romeo Iamandi Sports Hall, Buzău; Attendance: 1,580; Referees: Fahner, Kubis (POL)
10 February 2024; 19:00	2× (yellow card) 1× (suspension)	Report	1× (yellow card) 2× (suspension)	Romeo Iamandi Sports Hall, Buzău; Attendance: 1,580; Referees: Fahner, Kubis (POL)

17 February 2024; 20:00	**Chambray Touraine HB (France)**	**19–24**	**(Romania) HC Dunărea Brăila**	Gymnase de la Fontaine Blanche, Chambray-lès-Tours; Attendance: 752; Referees: Cipov, Klus (SVK)
17 February 2024; 20:00	Van der Heijden 5	(10–14)	Da Rocha 6	Gymnase de la Fontaine Blanche, Chambray-lès-Tours; Attendance: 752; Referees: Cipov, Klus (SVK)
17 February 2024; 20:00	1× (yellow card) 2× (suspension)	Report	3× (suspension)	Gymnase de la Fontaine Blanche, Chambray-lès-Tours; Attendance: 752; Referees: Cipov, Klus (SVK)

18 February 2024; 14:00	**Thüringer HC (Germany)**	**29–17**	**(Croatia) RK Lokomotiva Zagreb**	Salza-Halle, Bad Langensalza; Attendance: 999; Referees: Oyarzun, Zaragüeta (SPA)
18 February 2024; 14:00	Pichlmeier 6	(13–10)	Malec 6	Salza-Halle, Bad Langensalza; Attendance: 999; Referees: Oyarzun, Zaragüeta (SPA)
18 February 2024; 14:00	1× (yellow card) 1× (suspension)	Report	1× (yellow card) 3× (suspension)	Salza-Halle, Bad Langensalza; Attendance: 999; Referees: Oyarzun, Zaragüeta (SPA)

=== Group C ===
Pos	Team	Pld	W	D	L	GF	GA	GD	Pts	Qualification	GLO	NAN	BEN	LUB
1	(Romania) CS Gloria Bistrița	6	5	1	0	176	148	+28	**11**	Quarterfinals	—	19–19	33–24	26–23
2	(France) Neptunes de Nantes	6	3	1	2	190	171	+19	**7**	Quarterfinals	29–34	—	39–27	39–25
3	(Germany) HSG Bensheim/Auerbach	6	2	0	4	182	200	−18	**4**		27–35	37–30	—	35–29
4	(Poland) MKS FunFloor Perła Lublin	6	1	0	5	166	195	−29	**2**		26–29	29–34	34–32	—

Source: EHF

6 January 2024; 15:00	**CS Gloria Bistrița (Romania)**	**26–23**	**(Poland) MKS FunFloor Perła Lublin**	TeraPlast Arena, Bistrița; Attendance: 2,690; Referees: Bočáková, Jánošíková (SVK)
6 January 2024; 15:00	Mbengue 8	(13–10)	Płomińska, Więckowska 4	TeraPlast Arena, Bistrița; Attendance: 2,690; Referees: Bočáková, Jánošíková (SVK)
6 January 2024; 15:00	2× (yellow card) 6× (suspension)	Report	6× (suspension)	TeraPlast Arena, Bistrița; Attendance: 2,690; Referees: Bočáková, Jánošíková (SVK)

7 January 2024; 18:00	**Neptunes de Nantes (France)**	**39–27**	**(Germany) HSG Bensheim/Auerbach**	Complexe Sportif Mangin-Beaulieu, Nantes; Attendance: 2,414; Referees: Merisi, Pepe (ITA)
7 January 2024; 18:00	Horacek 6	(19–12)	Kretzschmar 8	Complexe Sportif Mangin-Beaulieu, Nantes; Attendance: 2,414; Referees: Merisi, Pepe (ITA)
7 January 2024; 18:00	1× (yellow card) 4× (suspension)	Report	5× (suspension)	Complexe Sportif Mangin-Beaulieu, Nantes; Attendance: 2,414; Referees: Merisi, Pepe (ITA)

13 January 2024; 16:00	**HSG Bensheim/Auerbach (Germany)**	**27–35**	**(Romania) CS Gloria Bistrița**	Untermainhalle, Elsenfeld; Attendance: 866; Referees: Andorka, Hucker (HUN)
13 January 2024; 16:00	Kretzschmar 6	(15–21)	Lima, Bazaliu 7	Untermainhalle, Elsenfeld; Attendance: 866; Referees: Andorka, Hucker (HUN)
13 January 2024; 16:00	2× (suspension)	Report	1× (yellow card) 1× (suspension)	Untermainhalle, Elsenfeld; Attendance: 866; Referees: Andorka, Hucker (HUN)

13 January 2024; 16:00	**MKS FunFloor Perła Lublin (Poland)**	**29–34**	**(France) Neptunes de Nantes**	Globus Hall, Lublin; Attendance: 2,623; Referees: Bojinovski, Nacevski (MKD)
13 January 2024; 16:00	Roszak 7	(14–16)	Ardouin 6	Globus Hall, Lublin; Attendance: 2,623; Referees: Bojinovski, Nacevski (MKD)
13 January 2024; 16:00		Report	2× (suspension)	Globus Hall, Lublin; Attendance: 2,623; Referees: Bojinovski, Nacevski (MKD)

20 January 2024; 16:00	**HSG Bensheim/Auerbach (Germany)**	**35–29**	**(Poland) MKS FunFloor Perła Lublin**	Untermainhalle, Elsenfeld; Attendance: 735; Referees: Ivanović, Vujisić (MNE)
20 January 2024; 16:00	Dekker 8	(17–15)	four players 4	Untermainhalle, Elsenfeld; Attendance: 735; Referees: Ivanović, Vujisić (MNE)
20 January 2024; 16:00	1× (yellow card) 6× (suspension) 1× (red card)	Report	1× (yellow card) 5× (suspension)	Untermainhalle, Elsenfeld; Attendance: 735; Referees: Ivanović, Vujisić (MNE)

20 January 2024; 17:00	**CS Gloria Bistrița (Romania)**	**19–19**	**(France) Neptunes de Nantes**	TeraPlast Arena, Bistrița; Attendance: 2,700; Referees: Jović, Arnautović (BIH)
20 January 2024; 17:00	Bazaliu 5	(11–9)	Horacek 5	TeraPlast Arena, Bistrița; Attendance: 2,700; Referees: Jović, Arnautović (BIH)
20 January 2024; 17:00	3× (suspension)	Report	1× (yellow card) 5× (suspension)	TeraPlast Arena, Bistrița; Attendance: 2,700; Referees: Jović, Arnautović (BIH)

3 February 2024; 16:00	**MKS FunFloor Perła Lublin (Poland)**	**34–32**	**(Germany) HSG Bensheim/Auerbach**	Globus Hall, Lublin; Attendance: 2,150; Referees: Panayides, Andreou (CYP)
3 February 2024; 16:00	Więckowska 8	(19–17)	Dekker 8	Globus Hall, Lublin; Attendance: 2,150; Referees: Panayides, Andreou (CYP)
3 February 2024; 16:00	2× (yellow card) 3× (suspension) 1× (red card)	Report	3× (suspension)	Globus Hall, Lublin; Attendance: 2,150; Referees: Panayides, Andreou (CYP)

4 February 2024; 18:00	**Neptunes de Nantes (France)**	**29–34**	**(Romania) CS Gloria Bistrița**	Complexe Sportif Mangin-Beaulieu, Nantes; Attendance: 2,121; Referees: (Netherlands) Schols, (Belgium) Martens
4 February 2024; 18:00	Horacek 8	(14–16)	Bazaliu 10	Complexe Sportif Mangin-Beaulieu, Nantes; Attendance: 2,121; Referees: (Netherlands) Schols, (Belgium) Martens
4 February 2024; 18:00	1× (yellow card) 4× (suspension) 1× (red card)	Report	3× (suspension)	Complexe Sportif Mangin-Beaulieu, Nantes; Attendance: 2,121; Referees: (Netherlands) Schols, (Belgium) Martens

10 February 2024; 16:00	**HSG Bensheim/Auerbach (Germany)**	**37–30**	**(France) Neptunes de Nantes**	Untermainhalle, Elsenfeld; Attendance: 681; Referees: Pukšič, Satler (SLO)
10 February 2024; 16:00	Kretzschmar 13	(19–19)	Horacek, Sajka 6	Untermainhalle, Elsenfeld; Attendance: 681; Referees: Pukšič, Satler (SLO)
10 February 2024; 16:00	1× (suspension)	Report	3× (suspension) 1× (red card)	Untermainhalle, Elsenfeld; Attendance: 681; Referees: Pukšič, Satler (SLO)

10 February 2024; 20:00	**MKS FunFloor Perła Lublin (Poland)**	**26–29**	**(Romania) CS Gloria Bistrița**	Globus Hall, Lublin; Attendance: 1,488; Referees: Borge, Nygren (NOR)
10 February 2024; 20:00	Balsam, Kovářová 4	(12–18)	Laslo 9	Globus Hall, Lublin; Attendance: 1,488; Referees: Borge, Nygren (NOR)
10 February 2024; 20:00	2× (suspension)	Report	6× (suspension)	Globus Hall, Lublin; Attendance: 1,488; Referees: Borge, Nygren (NOR)

17 February 2024; 19:00	**CS Gloria Bistrița (Romania)**	**33–24**	**(Germany) HSG Bensheim/Auerbach**	TeraPlast Arena, Bistrița; Attendance: 2,900; Referees: Jakovljević, Jovana Kovačević (SRB)
17 February 2024; 19:00	Seraficeanu 13	(18–16)	Dekker 6	TeraPlast Arena, Bistrița; Attendance: 2,900; Referees: Jakovljević, Jovana Kovačević (SRB)
17 February 2024; 19:00	2× (suspension)	Report	2× (suspension)	TeraPlast Arena, Bistrița; Attendance: 2,900; Referees: Jakovljević, Jovana Kovačević (SRB)

18 February 2024; 16:00	**Neptunes de Nantes (France)**	**39–25**	**(Poland) MKS FunFloor Perła Lublin**	Complexe Sportif Mangin-Beaulieu, Nantes; Attendance: 2,351; Referees: Weber, Weinquin (LUX)
18 February 2024; 16:00	Fauske 9	(19–15)	four players 4	Complexe Sportif Mangin-Beaulieu, Nantes; Attendance: 2,351; Referees: Weber, Weinquin (LUX)
18 February 2024; 16:00	1× (suspension)	Report	4× (suspension)	Complexe Sportif Mangin-Beaulieu, Nantes; Attendance: 2,351; Referees: Weber, Weinquin (LUX)

=== Group D ===
Pos	Team	Pld	W	D	L	GF	GA	GD	Pts	Qualification	SOL	MOS	COS	TAR
1	(Norway) Sola HK	6	5	0	1	195	164	+31	**10**	Quarterfinals	—	28–32	36–31	40–29
2	(Hungary) Motherson Mosonmagyaróvár	6	4	0	2	167	161	+6	**8**	Quarterfinals	29–34	—	25–23	33–27
3	(Spain) Costa del Sol Malaga	6	3	0	3	170	164	+6	**6**		22–26	29–26	—	30–26
4	(Romania) CSM Târgu Jiu	6	0	0	6	148	191	−43	**0**		21–31	20–22	25–35	—

Source: EHF

6 January 2024; 20:00	**Motherson Mosonmagyaróvár (Hungary)**	**33–27**	**(Romania) CSM Târgu Jiu**	UFM Aréna, Mosonmagyaróvár; Attendance: 1,000; Referees: Pétursson, Þrastarson (ISL)
6 January 2024; 20:00	Stranigg, E. Tóth, G. Tóth 7	(16–14)	Moldovan 5	UFM Aréna, Mosonmagyaróvár; Attendance: 1,000; Referees: Pétursson, Þrastarson (ISL)
6 January 2024; 20:00	2× (yellow card) 3× (suspension)	Report	2× (yellow card) 6× (suspension)	UFM Aréna, Mosonmagyaróvár; Attendance: 1,000; Referees: Pétursson, Þrastarson (ISL)

7 January 2024; 18:00	**Costa del Sol Malaga (Spain)**	**22–26**	**(Norway) Sola HK**	Pabellón José Luis Pérez Canca, Málaga; Attendance: 2,212; Referees: Mikelić, Parađina (CRO)
7 January 2024; 18:00	Bitolo 6	(13–15)	Novak 6	Pabellón José Luis Pérez Canca, Málaga; Attendance: 2,212; Referees: Mikelić, Parađina (CRO)
7 January 2024; 18:00	1× (suspension)	Report	1× (yellow card) 4× (suspension) 1× (red card)	Pabellón José Luis Pérez Canca, Málaga; Attendance: 2,212; Referees: Mikelić, Parađina (CRO)

14 January 2024; 13:00	**CSM Târgu Jiu (Romania)**	**25–35**	**(Spain) Costa del Sol Malaga**	Sports Hall, Târgu Jiu; Attendance: 1,000; Referees: Pagh, Thygesen (DEN)
14 January 2024; 13:00	Ciolan, Frățilescu 6	(13–16)	Doiro 8	Sports Hall, Târgu Jiu; Attendance: 1,000; Referees: Pagh, Thygesen (DEN)
14 January 2024; 13:00	3× (suspension)	Report	1× (yellow card) 3× (suspension)	Sports Hall, Târgu Jiu; Attendance: 1,000; Referees: Pagh, Thygesen (DEN)

14 January 2024; 18:00	**Sola HK (Norway)**	**28–32**	**(Hungary) Motherson Mosonmagyaróvár**	Stavanger Idrettshall, Stavanger; Attendance: 1,150; Referees: Cipov, Klus (SVK)
14 January 2024; 18:00	Holta 6	(13–16)	Pásztor, E. Tóth 7	Stavanger Idrettshall, Stavanger; Attendance: 1,150; Referees: Cipov, Klus (SVK)
14 January 2024; 18:00	1× (suspension)	Report	1× (yellow card) 4× (suspension)	Stavanger Idrettshall, Stavanger; Attendance: 1,150; Referees: Cipov, Klus (SVK)

20 January 2024; 18:00	**Sola HK (Norway)**	**40–29**	**(Romania) CSM Târgu Jiu**	Stavanger Idrettshall, Stavanger; Attendance: 1,235; Referees: Merisi, Pepe (ITA)
20 January 2024; 18:00	Tveiten 8	(23–10)	Frățilescu 8	Stavanger Idrettshall, Stavanger; Attendance: 1,235; Referees: Merisi, Pepe (ITA)
20 January 2024; 18:00	6× (suspension) 1× (red card)	Report	4× (suspension)	Stavanger Idrettshall, Stavanger; Attendance: 1,235; Referees: Merisi, Pepe (ITA)

21 January 2024; 18:00	**Costa del Sol Malaga (Spain)**	**29–26**	**(Hungary) Motherson Mosonmagyaróvár**	Pabellón José Luis Pérez Canca, Málaga; Attendance: 3,056; Referees: Charitsos, Naskos (GRE)
21 January 2024; 18:00	Bitolo 8	(16–12)	four players 4	Pabellón José Luis Pérez Canca, Málaga; Attendance: 3,056; Referees: Charitsos, Naskos (GRE)
21 January 2024; 18:00	4× (suspension)	Report	2× (yellow card) 4× (suspension)	Pabellón José Luis Pérez Canca, Málaga; Attendance: 3,056; Referees: Charitsos, Naskos (GRE)

3 February 2024; 16:00	**Motherson Mosonmagyaróvár (Hungary)**	**25–23**	**(Spain) Costa del Sol Malaga**	UFM Aréna, Mosonmagyaróvár; Attendance: 1,100; Referees: Maia, Nunes (POR)
3 February 2024; 16:00	E. Tóth 7	(14–11)	Arderíus 6	UFM Aréna, Mosonmagyaróvár; Attendance: 1,100; Referees: Maia, Nunes (POR)
3 February 2024; 16:00	7× (suspension) 1× (red card)	Report	4× (suspension)	UFM Aréna, Mosonmagyaróvár; Attendance: 1,100; Referees: Maia, Nunes (POR)

3 February 2024; 17:00	**CSM Târgu Jiu (Romania)**	**21–31**	**(Norway) Sola HK**	Sports Hall, Târgu Jiu; Attendance: 700; Referees: Ilievski, Ilievski (MKD)
3 February 2024; 17:00	Frățilescu 5	(9–18)	Herrem, Novak, Tveiten 6	Sports Hall, Târgu Jiu; Attendance: 700; Referees: Ilievski, Ilievski (MKD)
3 February 2024; 17:00	1× (yellow card) 2× (suspension)	Report	1× (yellow card) 3× (suspension)	Sports Hall, Târgu Jiu; Attendance: 700; Referees: Ilievski, Ilievski (MKD)

10 February 2024; 20:00	**Motherson Mosonmagyaróvár (Hungary)**	**29–34**	**(Norway) Sola HK**	UFM Aréna, Mosonmagyaróvár; Attendance: 1,000; Referees: Härgin, Makejev (EST)
10 February 2024; 20:00	E. Tóth 10	(16–22)	Herrem 9	UFM Aréna, Mosonmagyaróvár; Attendance: 1,000; Referees: Härgin, Makejev (EST)
10 February 2024; 20:00	3× (suspension)	Report	3× (suspension)	UFM Aréna, Mosonmagyaróvár; Attendance: 1,000; Referees: Härgin, Makejev (EST)

11 February 2024; 18:00	**Costa del Sol Malaga (Spain)**	**30–26**	**(Romania) CSM Târgu Jiu**	Pabellón Polideportivo Municipal Fernando Argüelles, Antequera; Attendance: 1,120; Referees: Klompers, Stobbe (NED)
11 February 2024; 18:00	Arderíus 7	(16–13)	Chiricuță 5	Pabellón Polideportivo Municipal Fernando Argüelles, Antequera; Attendance: 1,120; Referees: Klompers, Stobbe (NED)
11 February 2024; 18:00	1× (yellow card) 3× (suspension)	Report	2× (yellow card) 3× (suspension)	Pabellón Polideportivo Municipal Fernando Argüelles, Antequera; Attendance: 1,120; Referees: Klompers, Stobbe (NED)

17 February 2024; 16:00	**Sola HK (Norway)**	**36–31**	**(Spain) Costa del Sol Malaga**	Stavanger Idrettshall, Stavanger; Attendance: 1,086; Referees: Geraets, Geraets (NED)
17 February 2024; 16:00	Novak 8	(18–15)	Bravo 6	Stavanger Idrettshall, Stavanger; Attendance: 1,086; Referees: Geraets, Geraets (NED)
17 February 2024; 16:00	1× (yellow card) 2× (suspension)	Report	2× (yellow card) 3× (suspension)	Stavanger Idrettshall, Stavanger; Attendance: 1,086; Referees: Geraets, Geraets (NED)

18 February 2024; 19:00	**CSM Târgu Jiu (Romania)**	**20–22**	**(Hungary) Motherson Mosonmagyaróvár**	Sports Hall, Târgu Jiu; Attendance: 450; Referees: Mandák, Rudinský (SVK)
18 February 2024; 19:00	Ciolan, Frățilescu 5	(10–10)	Pásztor, E. Tóth 4	Sports Hall, Târgu Jiu; Attendance: 450; Referees: Mandák, Rudinský (SVK)
18 February 2024; 19:00	2× (yellow card) 5× (suspension)	Report	1× (yellow card) 10× (suspension) 1× (red card)	Sports Hall, Târgu Jiu; Attendance: 450; Referees: Mandák, Rudinský (SVK)
