= Ane Høgseth =

Norwegian handball player (born 2001)

Personal information
- Full name: Ane Cecilie Høgseth
- Nationality: Norwegian
- Born: 15 January 2001 (age 25) Oslo, Norway
- Height: 1.80 m (5 ft 11 in)

Sport
- Sport: Handball
- Position: Pivot
- Current club: Ikast Håndbold
- Number: 20

Youth career
- Years: Team
- 2014–2016: Ammerud IL
- 2016–2017: Kjelsås IL
- 2017–2018: Nit-Hak HK

Senior clubs
- Years: Team
- 2018–2021: Aker Topphåndball
- 2021–2025: Storhamar HE
- 01/2025–06/2025: → Ikast Håndbold (loan)
- 2025–2026: Ikast Håndbold
- 2026–: Storhamar HE
National team
| Years | Team | Apps | (Gls) |
| 2022– | Norway | 33 | (16) |
Medal record
European Championship
| Gold medal – first place | 2022 Slovenia/North Macedonia/Montenegro |
| Gold medal – first place | 2024 Austria/Hungary/Switzerland |
Junior European Championship
| Bronze medal – third place | 2019 Hungary |
Youth European Championship
| Silver medal – second place | 2017 Slovakia |

Ane Cecilie Høgseth (born 15 January 2001) is a Norwegian handball player who plays for Ikast Håndbold and the Norwegian national team.

== International career ==
She also represented Norway in the 2017 European Women's U-17 Handball Championship and in the 2019 Women's U-19 European Handball Championship, where she won bronze and silver.

At the 2022 European Championship, she and Norway won gold. Two years later she won the 2024 European Championship, beating Denmark in the final.

== Club career ==
Høgseth made her senior debut for the Norwegian second tier club Aker Topphåndball in 2018. In 2019 she was promoted with the team to the Norwegian top division.

On 10 March 2021, it was announced that she had signed a 2-year contract with Storhamar HE. Here she won the 2023-24 EHF European League.

In January 2025 she was loaned to the Danish club Ikast Håndbold. She had originally signed a one-year contract starting the following summer, but half a year before Ikast decided to sign her on a loan-deal to have a better squad depth. For the 2026-27 season she will return to Storhamar on a contract until 2029.

== Achievements ==
- European Championship:
  - Winner: 2022, 2024
- Junior European Championship:
  - Bronze Medalist: 2019
- Youth European Championship:
  - Silver Medalist: 2017
- EHF European League:
  - Winner: 2023/2024
- Norwegian League:
  - Silver: 2021/2022, 2022/2023, 2023/2024
- Norwegian Cup:
  - Winner: 2024
  - Finalist: 2023/2024

== Awards and recognition ==
- All-Star Team Best Line Player of the Junior European Championship: 2019
