= Maja Jakobsen =

Norwegian handball player (born 1990)

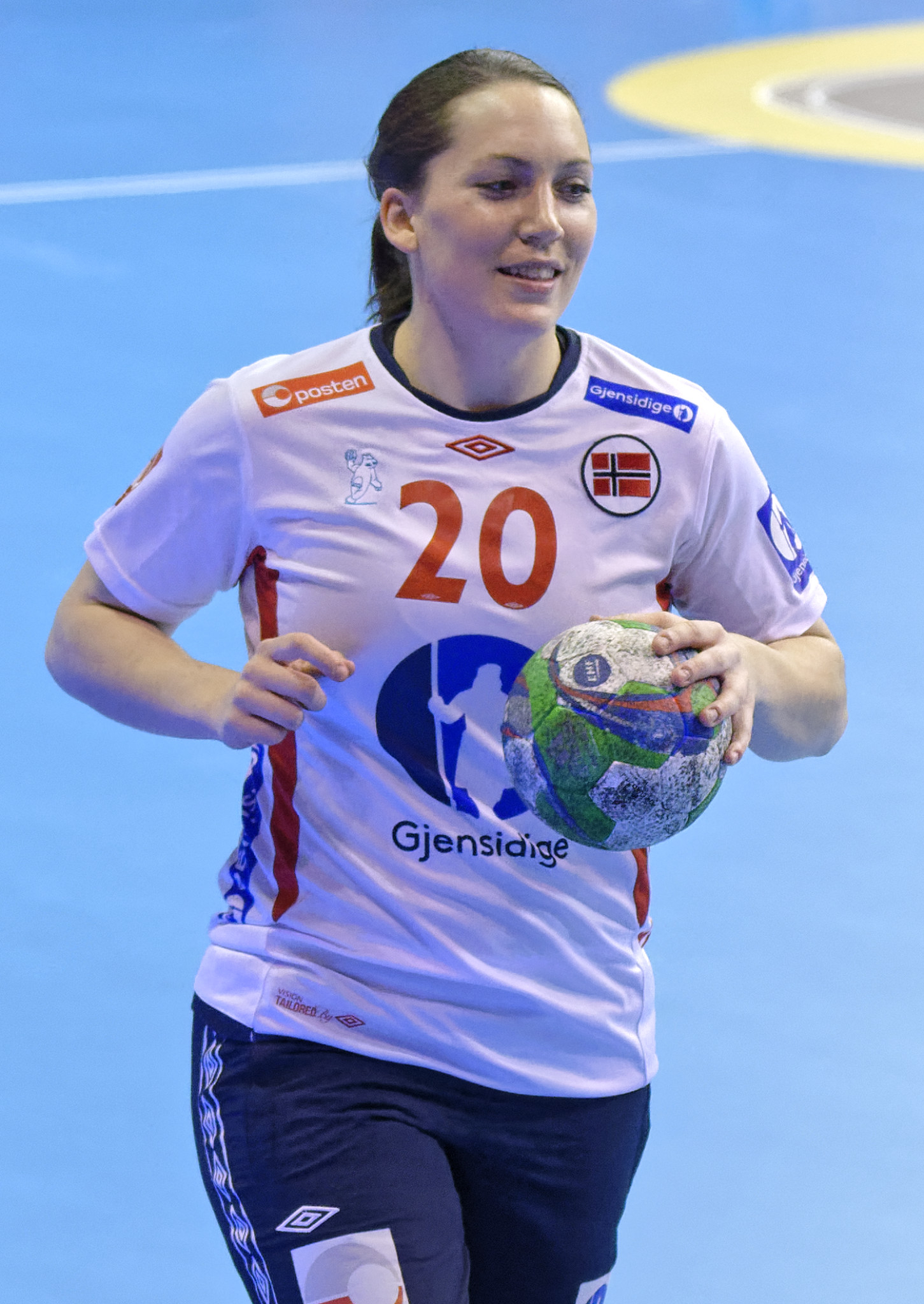

Personal information
- Nationality: Norwegian
- Born: 28 March 1990 (age 36) Raufoss, Norway
- Height: 1.70 m (5 ft 7 in)

Sport
- Sport: Handball
- Position: Right back

Senior clubs
- Years: Team
- 2006–2010: Storhamar HE
- 2010–2011: Byåsen HE
- 2011–2015: Storhamar HE
- 2015–2019: Odense Håndbold
- 2019–2024: Storhamar HE
National team
Years	Team	Apps	(Gls)
2012–2016	Norway	40	(37)
Medal record
European Championship
Gold medal – first place	2014 Croatia/Hungary
Silver medal – second place	2012 Serbia
Junior World Championship
Gold medal – first place	2010 South Korea
Junior European Championship
Gold medal – first place	2009 Hungary

Maja Jakobsen (born 28 March 1990) is a retired Norwegian handball player who last played for Storhamar HE.

She made her debut on the Norwegian national team in 2012.

== Achievements ==
- Junior European Championship:
  - Winner: 2009
- Junior World Championship:
  - Winner: 2010
- European Championship:
  - Winner: 2014
  - Silver Medalist: 2012
- EHF European League:
  - Winner: 2023/2024
- Norwegian League
  - Silver Medalist: 2019/2020, 2020/2021, 2021/2022, 2022/2023, 2023/2024
  - Bronze Medalist: 2007/2008, 2009/2010, 2011/2012
- Norwegian Cup:
  - Finalist: 2019, 2023/2024

== Individual awards ==
- All-Star Right Back of REMA 1000-ligaen: 2020/2021
- Grundigligaen: Top scorer 2014/2015 (162 goals)
