= Tina Abdulla =

Norwegian handball player (born 1997)

Personal information
- Nationality: Norwegian • Macedonian
- Born: 20 September 1997 (age 29) Skopje, North Macedonia
- Height: 1.64 m (5 ft 5 in)

Sport
- Sport: Handball
- Position: Right Wing
- Current club: Odense Håndbold
- Number: 11

Senior clubs
- Years: Team
- 2014–2016: Viking TIF
- 2016–2020: Tertnes HE
- 2020–2022: Borussia Dortmund Handball
- 2022–2025: Storhamar HE
- 2025–: Odense Håndbold
National team
Years	Team	Apps	(Gls)
2023–	Norway	4	(7)

Tina Abdulla (born 20 September 1997) is a Norwegian handball player for Odense Håndbold.

Abdulla represented Norway at the 2015 Women's U-19 European Handball Championship in Spain, placing 6th and at the 2016 Women's Junior World Handball Championship in Russia, placing 5th.

Her last name is often misspelled as Abdula or Abdullah.

== Achievements ==
- EHF European League:
  - Winner: 2023/2024
- Handball-Bundesliga Frauen:
  - Winner: 2020/21
- Norwegian League:
  - Gold: 2024/25
  - Silver: 2022/23, 2023/24
  - Bronze: 2018/19
- Norwegian Cup:
  - Winner: 2024
  - Finalist: 2023/2024
  - Bronze: 2022/2023
- Danish League:
  - Silver: 2026

== Personal life ==
Born in Skopje, she is of Albanian descent.
