= Susanne Amundsen =

Norwegian handball player (born 2002)

Personal information
- Full name: Susanne Liberg Amundsen
- Nationality: Norwegian
- Born: 20 August 2002 (age 24) Elverum, Norway
- Height: 1.60 m (5 ft 3 in)

Sport
- Sport: Handball
- Position: Left Wing
- Current club: Molde Elite
- Number: 44

Senior clubs
- Years: Team
- 2020–2024: Storhamar HE
- 2024–2026: Molde Elite
- 2026–: Storhamar HE
Medal record
Junior World Championship
Gold medal – first place	2022 Slovenia

Susanne Liberg Amundsen (born 20 August 2002) is a Norwegian handball player for Molde Elite.

On 26 September 2022, Amundsen was selected to be a part of the extended squad for the 2022 European Women's Handball Championship.

== Achievements ==
- Junior World Championship:
  - Gold Medalist: 2022
- EHF European League:
  - Winner: 2023/2024
- Norwegian League:
  - Silver: 2020/2021, 2021/2022, 2022/2023, 2023/2024
  - Bronze: 2025/2026
- Norwegian Cup:
  - Finalist: 2023/2024
