= Mathilde Rivas Toft =

Norwegian handball player (born 1997)

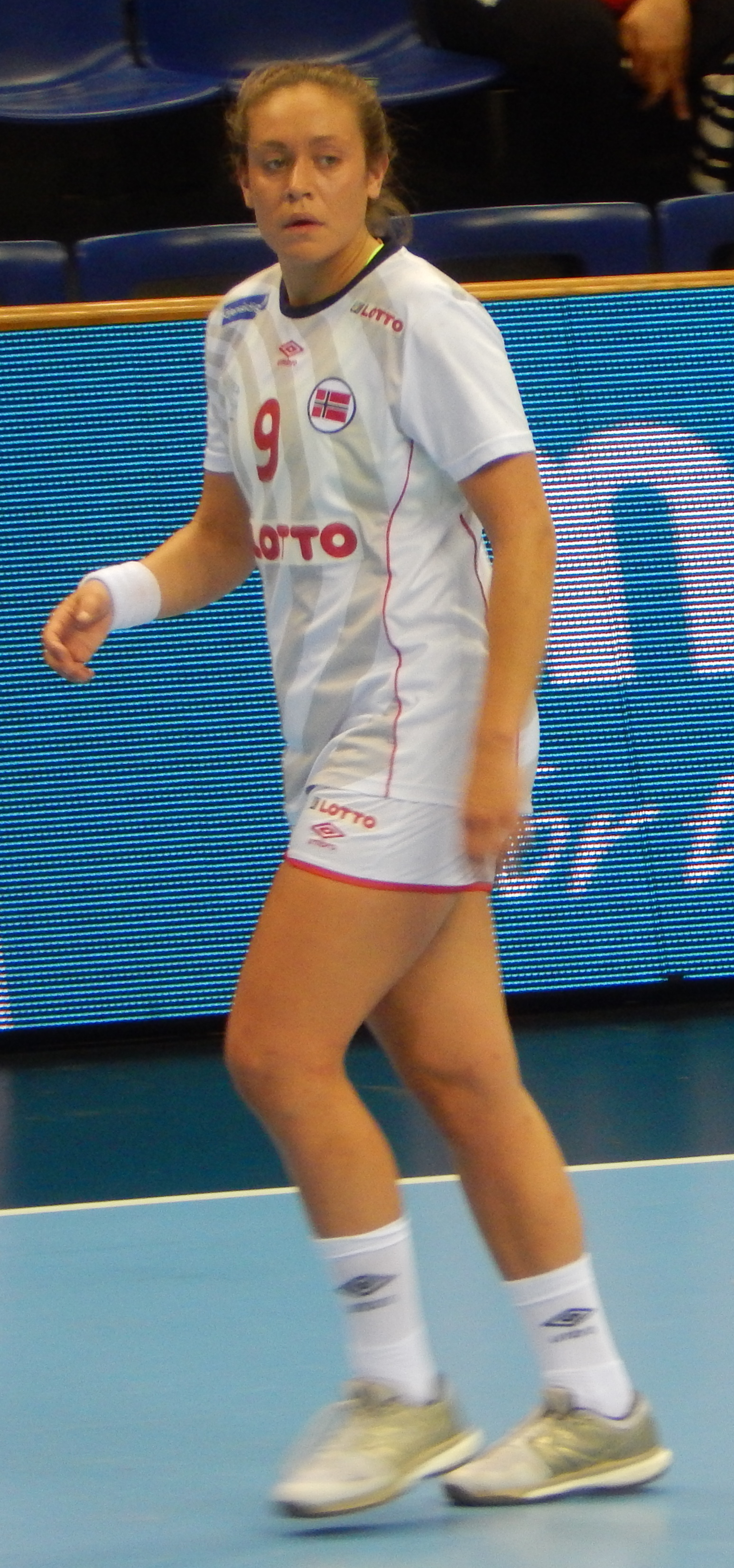
- Moscow 2016

Personal information
- Nationality: Norwegian
- Born: 16 April 1997 (age 29) Lørenskog, Norway
- Height: 1.71 m (5 ft 7 in)

Sport
- Sport: Handball
- Position: Right back
- Current club: Storhamar HE
- Number: 9

Youth career
- Years: Team
- –: Ullensaker/Kisa IL
- –: Skedsmo HK

Senior clubs
- Years: Team
- 2013–2014: Oppsal
- 2014–2016: Nordstrand IF
- 2016–2017: Aker Topphåndball
- 2017–2019: Larvik HK
- 2019–2021: Molde Elite
- 2021–2023: Viborg HK
- 2023–: Storhamar HE

Mathilde Rivas Toft (born 16 April 1997) is a Norwegian handballer who plays for Storhamar HE.

She also represented Norway in the 2016 Women's Junior World Handball Championship, placing 5th.

== Achievements ==
- EHF European League:
  - Winner: 2023/2024
- REMA 1000-ligaen
  - Gold: 2024/2025
  - Silver: 2023/2024, 2025/2026
- Norwegian Cup:
  - Winner: 2024, 2025
  - Finalist: 2023/2024

== Individual awards ==
- All Star Right Wing of the IHF Junior World Championship: 2016
