= Marlena Urbańska =

Polish handball player (born 1998)

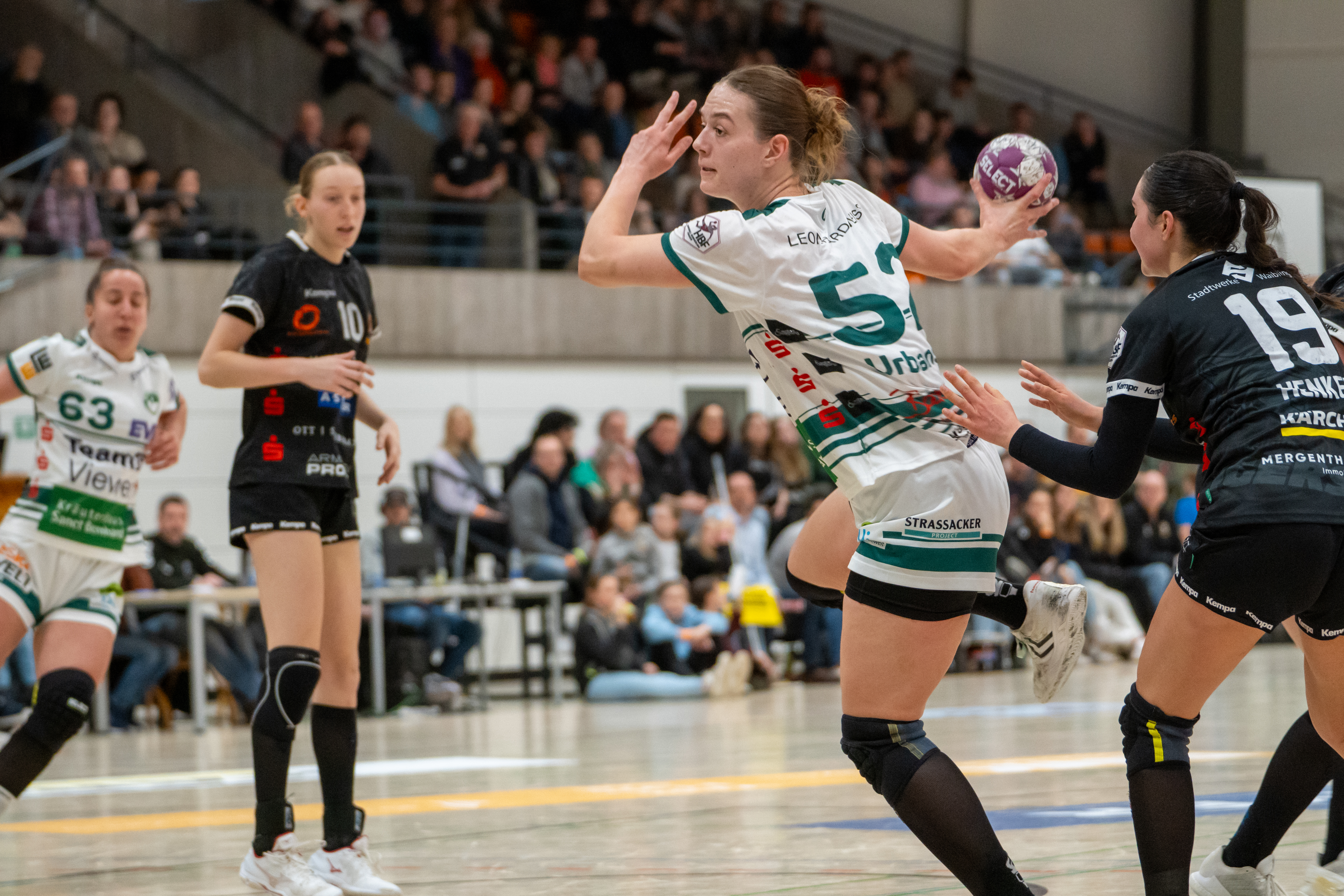

Personal information
- Nationality: Polish
- Born: 11 January 1998 (age 28) Szczecin, Poland
- Height: 1.86 m (6 ft 1 in)

Sport
- Sport: Handball
- Position: Line player
- Current club: Molde Elite
- Number: 74

Senior clubs
- Years: Team
- 2017–2019: Pogoń Szczecin
- 2019–2020: Pogoń 1922 Żory
- 2021–2022: Pogoń Szczecin
- 2022–2024: Frisch Auf Göppingen
- 2024–: Molde Elite
National team
Years	Team	Apps	(Gls)
2023–	Poland	22	(18)

Marlena Urbańska (born 11 January 1998) is a Polish handballer for Molde Elite and the Polish national team.

She participated at the 2024 European Women's Handball Championship in Hungary, Switzerland and Austria.
