= 1996–97 Women's EHF Cup =

European handball tournament

The 1996–97 Women's EHF Cup was the 15th edition of the competition, running from 11 October 1996 to 11 May 1997. Olimpija Ljubljana defeated Borussia Dortmund in the final to become the first Slovenian club to win the competition. Oțelul Galați (which defeated defending champion Debreceni VSC in the quarterfinals) and Vasas Budapest also reached the semifinals.

== Qualifying round ==
Team #1	Agg.	Team #2	1st	2nd
Olimpija Ljubljana (Slovenia)	51–36	(Croatia) Kraš Zagreb	28–14	23–22
Castelo Branco (Portugal)	40–51	(Italy) Siracusa	20–21	20–31
Rostselmash (Russia)	41–35	(Turkey) Istanbul	21–18	20–17
Kefalovrysos Kythreas (Cyprus)	35–73	(Switzerland) SPONO Nottwil	19–40	16–33
Amadeo Tortajada (Spain)	94–20	(Georgia (country)) Kolkheti Poti	48–6	46–14
Sosnica Gliwice (Poland)	69–45	(Austria) Fünfhaus	36–25	33–20
Borussia Dortmund (Germany)	52–37	(North Macedonia) Pelister Bitola	31–18	21–19
Avtomobilist Brovary (Ukraine)	82–24	(Luxembourg) Diekirch	46–17	36–7
Issy (France)	66–24	(Greece) Athinaikos	30–10	33–14
Voždovac (Federal Republic of Yugoslavia)	34–56	(Slovakia) Plastika Nitra	17–30	17–26
VOC Amsterdam (Netherlands)	64–29	(Bosnia and Herzegovina) Goražde	36–18	28–11
Oțelul Galați (Romania)	68–43	(Bulgaria) Haskovo	31–24	37–19

== Round of 16 ==
Team #1	Agg.	Team #2	1st	2nd
Olimpija Ljubljana (Slovenia)	53–37	(Denmark) GOG Gudme	28–13	25–24
Siracusa (Italy)	26–57	(Russia) Rostselmash	11–30	15–27
SPONO Nottwil (Switzerland)	34–58	(Spain) Amadeo Tortajada	18–32	16–26
Sosnica Gliwice (Poland)	43–57	(Hungary) Vasas Budapest	21–33	22–24
Borussia Dortmund (Germany)	46–45	(Norway) Baekkelagets	23–22	23–23
Avtomobilist Brovary (Ukraine)	44–41	(France) Issy	19–19	25–22
Plastika Nitra (Slovakia)	31–31	(Hungary) Debreceni VSC	19–14	12–17
VOC Amsterdam (Netherlands)	46–53	(Romania) Oțelul Galați	24–24	22–29

== Quarter-finals ==
Team #1	Agg.	Team #2	1st	2nd
Olimpija Ljubljana (Slovenia)	43–42	(Russia) Rostselmash	24–21	19–21
Amadeo Tortajada (Spain)	40–40	(Hungary) Vasas Budapest	20–21	20–19
Borussia Dortmund (Germany)	71–43	(Ukraine) Avtomobilist Brovary	31–23	40–20
Debreceni VSC (Hungary)	34–35	(Romania) Oțelul Galați	17–14	17–21

== Semifinals ==
Team #1	Agg.	Team #2	1st	2nd
Olimpija Ljubljana (Slovenia)	47–41	(Hungary) Vasas Budapest	21–17	26–24
Borussia Dortmund (Germany)	45–36	(Romania) Oțelul Galați	26–16	19–20

== Final ==
Team #1	Agg.	Team #2	1st	2nd
Olimpija Ljubljana (Slovenia)	52–48	(Germany) Borussia Dortmund	26–18	26–30
