= Tonje Enkerud =

Norwegian handball player (born 1994)

Personal information
- Nationality: Norwegian
- Born: 21 August 1994 (age 32) Flisa, Norway
- Height: 1.77 m (5 ft 10 in)

Sport
- Sport: Handball
- Position: Centre back
- Current club: Storhamar HE
- Number: 11

Senior clubs
- Years: Team
- –2011: Flisa IL
- 2011–2021: Storhamar HE
- 2021–2023: Viborg HK
- 2023–: Storhamar HE
National team
Years	Team	Apps	(Gls)
2018–2021	Norway	5	(6)
Medal record
Youth World Championship
Bronze medal – third place	2012 Montenegro
Youth European Championship
Bronze medal – third place	2011 Czech Republic

Tonje Enkerud (born 21 August 1994) is a Norwegian handball player for Storhamar HE and the Norwegian national team.

She also represented Norway in the 2013 Women's Junior European Handball Championship, placing 4th, and in the 2014 Women's Junior World Handball Championship, placing 9th.

== Achievements ==
- World Youth Championship:
  - Bronze Medalist: 2012
- Youth European Championship:
  - Bronze Medalist: 2011
- Norwegian League
  - Gold Medalist: 2024/2025
  - Silver Medalist: 2018/2019, 2019/2020, 2020/2021, 2025/2026
  - Bronze Medalist: 2017/2018
- Norwegian Cup:
  - Winner: 2024, 2025
  - Finalist: 2018, 2019
