= Tonje Løseth =

Norwegian handball player (born 1991)

Personal information
- Nationality: Norwegian
- Born: 1 January 1991 (age 35) Bergen, Norway
- Height: 1.83 m (6 ft 0 in)

Sport
- Sport: Handball
- Position: Left back
- Current club: København Håndbold
- Number: 25

Senior clubs
- Years: Team
- –: Bønes IL
- –: Årstad IL
- –2010: TIF Viking
- 2010–2015: Tertnes HE
- 2015–2017: TuS Metzingen
- 2017–2020: Herning-Ikast Håndbold
- 2020–2022: Brest Bretagne Handball
- 2022–2024: Odense Håndbold
- 2024–2025: København Håndbold
- 2025–: Molde Elite
National team
| Years | Team | Apps | (Gls) |
| 2013–2017 | Norway | 10 | (3) |

Tonje Løseth (born 1 January 1991) is a Norwegian handball player for København Håndbold.

In 2015 she signed to play for Tus Metzingen.

== Achievements ==
- EHF Champions League:
  - Silver: 2020/2021
- REMA 1000-ligaen:
  - Bronze: 2025/26
- Danish Cup:
  - Gold: 2019
- French Championship:
  - Gold: 2021
- French Cup:
  - Gold: 2021
