= Ine Karlsen Stangvik =

Norwegian handball player (born 1990)

Ine Stangvik
Personal information
- Full name: Ine Karlsen Stangvik
- Nationality: Norwegian
- Born: 4 April 1990 (age 36) Oslo, Norway
- Height: 1.79 m (5 ft 10 in)

Sport
- Sport: Handball
- Position: Goalkeeper

Senior clubs
- Years: Team
- –: Ellingsrud IL
- –2015: Nordstrand IF
- 2015–2017: København Håndbold
- 2017–2018: Team Esbjerg
- 2018: ESBF Besançon
- 2018–2024: Molde Elite

Ine Karlsen Stangvik (born 4 April 1990) is a former Norwegian handball player who last played for Molde Elite.

== Achievements ==
- Norwegian Cup:
  - Finalist: 2021
