= Merel Freriks =

Dutch handball player (born 1998)

Personal information
- Nationality: Dutch
- Born: 6 January 1998 (age 28) Hoofddorp, Netherlands
- Height: 1.75 m (5 ft 9 in)

Sport
- Sport: Handball
- Position: Pivot
- Current club: Borussia Dortmund
- Number: 28

Youth career
- Years: Team
- –: HV Borger

Senior clubs
- Years: Team
- –2017: Emmen & Omstreken
- 2017–2019: HSG Bensheim/Auerbach
- 2019–2022: Borussia Dortmund
- 2022–2024: Brest Bretagne Handball
- 2024–01/2025: Vipers Kristiansand
- 01/2025–06/2025: Team Esbjerg
- 07/2025–2026: CSM București
- 2026–: Borussia Dortmund
National team
Years	Team	Apps	(Gls)
2017–	Netherlands	97	(179)
Medal record
World Championship
Gold medal – first place	2019 Japan
European Championship
Bronze medal – third place	2018 France

Merel Freriks (born 6 January 1998) is a Dutch female handball player for Borussia Dortmund and the Dutch national team.

She was a part the Netherlands team that won the 2019 World Women's Handball Championship; the first title in the country's history.

== Career ==
Merel Freriks began playing handball at HV Borger. In 2010 she joined E&O.

In 2017 she joined German Bundesliga side HSG Bensheim/Auerbach. In October the same year, she debuted for the Dutch national team. At the 2018 European Championship she won a bronze medal. In 2019 she joined league rivals Borussia Dortmund Here she won the 2021 German championship.

In 2022 she joined French team Brest Bretagne Handball. In November 2023 she suffered a cruciate ligament injury, that made her miss the 2023 World Championship In 2024 she joined Norwegian top club Vipers Kristiansand.

In January 2025 she joined Danish Team Esbjerg, after her former club, Norwegian Vipers Kristiansand went bankrupt.

== Achievements ==
=== Club ===
- German league (Bundesliga):
  - Winner: 2021 (with Borussia Dortmund Handball)
  - Runner up: 2022 (with Borussia Dortmund Handball)
- EHF Champions League
  - Bronze Medalist: 2024-25
- Danish League:
  - Silver Medalist: 2025

=== International ===
- World Championship
  - Gold: 2019
- European Championship
  - Bronze: 2018
