= Lisa Antl =

German handball player (born 2000)

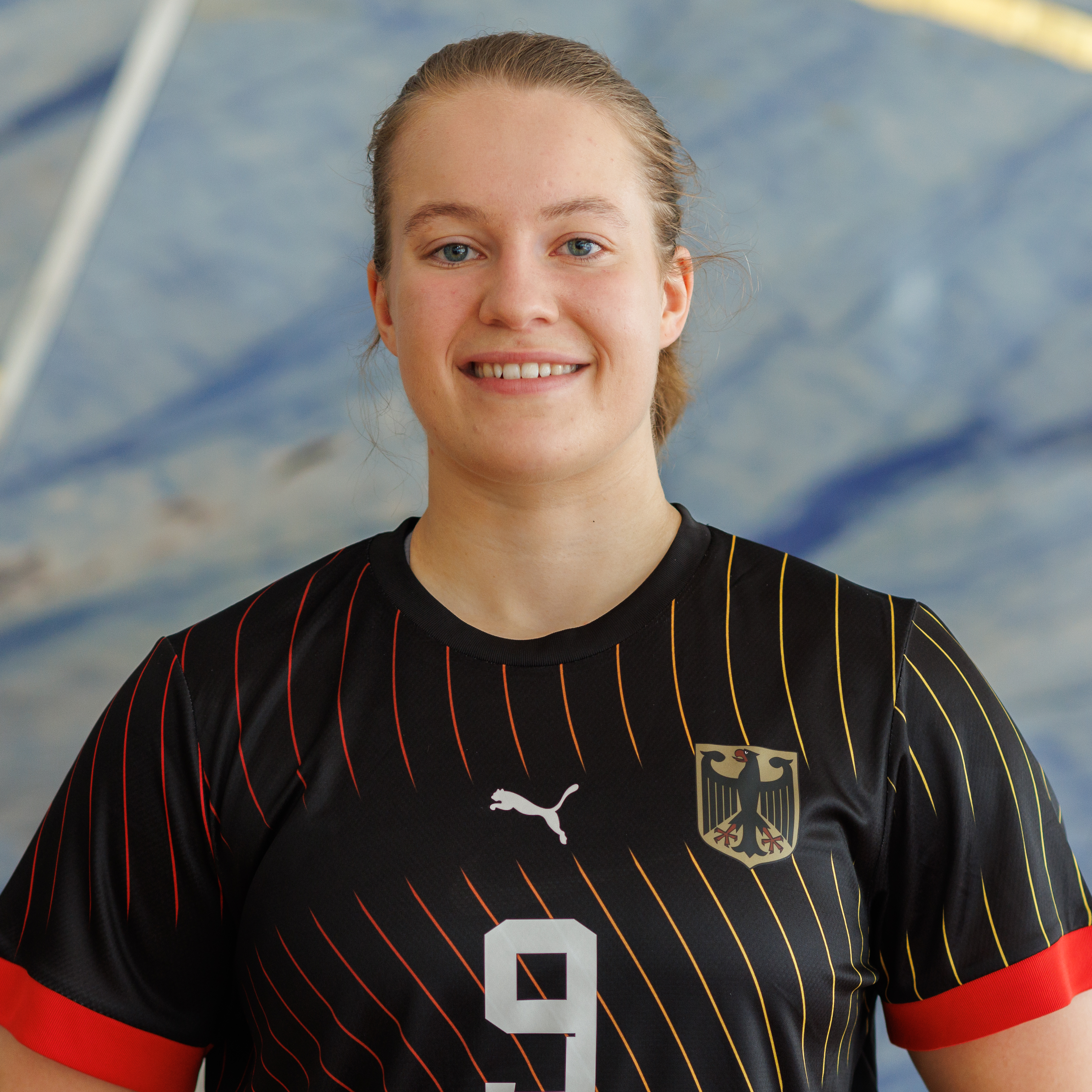

Personal information
- Full name: Lisa Carolin Antl
- Nationality: German
- Born: 21 June 2000 (age 26) Ingolstadt, Germany
- Height: 1.72 m (5 ft 8 in)

Sport
- Sport: Handball
- Position: Pivot
- Current club: Borussia Dortmund Handball
- Number: 9

Youth career
- Years: Team
- 2004-2015: TSV Gaimersheim
- 2015-2016: MTV Ingolstadt

Senior clubs
- Years: Team
- 2016-2017: HG Ingolstadt
- 2017-2019: HCD Gröbenzell
- 2019-2022: Buxtehuder SV
- 2022-: Borussia Dortmund Handball
National team
Years	Team	Apps	(Gls)
2021–	Germany	72	(110)
Medal record
World Championship
Silver medal – second place	2025 Netherlands/Germany
- Updated on 6 November 2025

Lisa Carolin Antl (born 21 June 2000) is a German handball player for Borussia Dortmund Handball and the German national team.

She represented Germany at the 2021 World Women's Handball Championship in Spain.

She also represented Germany at the 2025 World Women's Handball Championship. Here Germany reached the final, where they lost to Norway. This was the first time since 1994 that Germany made the final of a major international tournament and the first time they won a medal since 2007.
