= Borussia Dortmund Handball =

German handball club

- Full name: Ballspielverein Borussia 1909 e. V. Dortmund
- Short name: Borussia Dortmund
- Founded: 1909
- Arena: Sporthalle Wellinghofen, Dortmund
- Capacity: 2,500
- President: Reinhard Rauball
- Head coach: Henk Groener
- League: HBL
- 2025–26: 2nd
- Club colours
Home	Away

Borussia Dortmund (Ballspielverein Borussia 1909 e.V. Dortmund, BVB, BVB 09) is a German professional women's handball team from Dortmund. They are currently competing in the 2025–26 Handball-Bundesliga and the 2025–26 Women's EHF Champions League.

The team promoted to the Handball-Bundesliga Frauen in the 2015–2016 season, the top division in Germany. They officially won the German championship for the first time in 2021, after having previously won in 2020. The 2019–20 season was canceled with no winner declared due to the COVID-19 pandemic.

== Kits ==
HOME
2013-14	2014-15	2015-16	2016-17	2017-18	2018-19	2019-20	2020-21	2021-22	2022-23

AWAY
2013-14	2014-16	2016-17	2017-18	2018-19	2019-20	2020-21	2021-22	2022-23

THIRD
2021-22

== Honours ==
- Handball-Bundesliga Frauen:
  - Champions: 2021
  - Runners-Up: 2026
  - Bronze: 2000
- DHB-Pokal:
  - Winners: 1997, 2026
  - Finalists: 2016
- EHF Challenge Cup:
  - Winners: 2003

== Team ==
=== Current squad ===
Squad for the 2026-27 season

Goalkeepers

- 1 (Montenegro) Teodora Roncevic
- 11 (Spain) Nicole Wiggins
- 12 (Germany) Sarah Wachter

Wingers
LW

- 3 (Germany) Anna-Lena Hausherr
- 24 (Spain) Ona Vegué i Pena
- 44 (Germany) Lara Egeling

RW

- 26 (Netherlands) Pam Korsten
- 31 (Netherlands) Kelly Vollebregt

Line players

- 9 (Germany) Lisa Antl
- 20 (Netherlands) Merel Freriks
- 29 (Sweden) Emma Olsson

Back players
LB

- 33 (Norway) Guro Nestaker
- 66 (Germany) Dana Bleckmann

CB

- 2 (Germany) Mareike Thomaier
- 4 (Germany) Alina Grijseels

RB

- 14 (Netherlands) Alieke van Maurik
- 17 (Germany) Alicia Langer (maternity leave)
- 19 (North Macedonia) Iva Mladenovska
- 6 (Germany) Laetitia Quist

=== Transfers ===
Transfers for the 2026–27 season

Joining

- (Netherlands) Merel Freriks (LP) (from (Romania) CSM București)
- (Spain) Nicole Wiggins (GK) (from (Spain) BM Bera Bera)
- (Spain) Ona Vegué i Pena (LW) (from (Germany) HSG Blomberg-Lippe)
- (Germany) Mareike Thomaier (CB) (from (Germany) HSG Bensheim-Auerbach)
- (Netherlands) Pam Korsten (RW) (from (Germany) VfL Oldenburg)
- (North Macedonia) Iva Mladenovska (RB) (from (France) ESBF Besançon)
- (Germany) Laetitia Quist (RB) (from (Hungary) Mosonmagyaróvári KC SE)

Leaving

- (Netherlands) Lois Abbingh (LB) (retires)
- (Denmark) Kaja Kamp (LP) (to (Denmark) HØJ Elite)
- (Hungary) Melinda Szikora (GK) (retires)
- (Norway) Guro Berland Husebø (LW) (to (Denmark) Ajax København)
- (France) Déborah Lassource (CB) (to (France) Jeanne d'Arc Dijon)
- (Germany) Mareike Kusian (RW) (to (Germany) TuS Metzingen)
- (Germany) Lara Müller (LB) (to (Germany) VfL Oldenburg)

=== Notable former players ===
- (Germany) Franziska Heinz
- (Germany) Eike Bram
- (Germany) Michaela Erler
- (Germany) Silke Gnad
- (Germany) Nadine Härdter
- (Germany) Ulrike Stange
- (Germany) Nadja Nadgornaja
- (Germany) Clara Woltering
- (Germany) Alina Grijseels
- (Germany) Svenja Huber
- (Germany) Isabell Roch
- (Germany) Jennifer Rode
- (Germany) Mia Zschocke
- (Germany) Amelie Berger
- (Germany) Madita Kohorst
- (Germany) Lena Degenhardt
- (Netherlands) Kelly Vollebregt
- (Netherlands) Kelly Dulfer
- (Netherlands) Inger Smits
- (Netherlands) Rinka Duijndam
- (Netherlands) Laura van der Heijden
- (Netherlands) Merel Freriks
- (Netherlands) Yara ten Holte
- (Netherlands) Zoë Sprengers
- (Netherlands) Harma van Kreij
- (Netherlands) Tess Lieder
- (Hungary) Ágnes Farkas
- (Hungary) Míra Emberovics
- (Hungary) Virág Vaszari
- (Poland) Bogna Sobiech
- (Poland) Aleksandra Zych
- (Poland) Emilia Galińska
- (Norway) Tonje Sagstuen
- (Norway) Kari Solem
- (Norway) Tina Abdulla
- (Norway) Frida Nåmo Rønning
- (Spain) Irene Espínola
- (Spain) Jennifer Gutiérrez Bermejo
- (Spain) Carmen Campos
- (Romania) Narcisa Lecușanu
- (Romania) Lidia Drăgănescu
- (Japan) Asuka Fujita
- (Japan) Haruno Sasaki
- (Iceland) Hildigunnur Einarsdóttir
- (Sweden) Clara Monti Danielsson
- (South Korea) Kim Eun-mi
- (Australia) Sally Potocki

== Statistics ==
=== Top scorers in the EHF Champions League ===
(All-Time) – Last updated on 20 December 2025

Rank	Name	Seasons played	Goals
1	(Germany) Alina Grijseels	3	165
2	(Netherlands) Merel Freriks	2	78
3	(Netherlands) Laura van der Heijden	2	76
4	(Spain) Jennifer Gutiérrez	2	59
5	(Netherlands) Kelly Vollebregt	2	56
6	(Netherlands) Inger Smits	1	55
7	(Norway) Tina Abdulla	2	47
8	(Germany) Mia Zschocke	1	41
9	(Germany) Dana Bleckmann	3	38
10	(France) Déborah Lassource	1	35

== European record ==
=== EHF Champions League ===
Season	Competition	Round	Club	1st leg	2nd leg	Aggregate
2020–21	Champions League	Group stage Group B	(Romania) SCM Râmnicu Vâlcea	0–10	10–0	7th place
2020–21	Champions League	Group stage Group B	(Hungary) Győri Audi ETO KC	24–34	25–38	7th place
2020–21	Champions League	Group stage Group B	(Montenegro) ŽRK Budućnost	26–28	27–31	7th place
2020–21	Champions League	Group stage Group B	(Russia) CSKA Moscow	28–29	28–35	7th place
2020–21	Champions League	Group stage Group B	(France) Brest Bretagne	29–41	33–33	7th place
2020–21	Champions League	Group stage Group B	(Denmark) Odense Håndbold	27–32	32–24	7th place
2020–21	Champions League	Group stage Group B	(Croatia) RK Podravka Koprivnica	26–25	32–31	7th place
2020–21	Champions League	Round of 16	(France) Metz Handball	0–10	0–10	0–20
2021–22	Champions League	Group stage (Group A)	(France) Brest Bretagne Handball	30–27	25–31	6th place
2021–22	Champions League	Group stage (Group A)	(Montenegro) Budućnost	30–34	34–29	6th place
2021–22	Champions League	Group stage (Group A)	(Romania) CSM București	22–25	29–33	6th place
2021–22	Champions League	Group stage (Group A)	(Hungary) FTC-Rail Cargo Hungaria	25–25	21–23	6th place
2021–22	Champions League	Group stage (Group A)	(Russia) Rostov-Don	25–31	27–37	6th place
2021–22	Champions League	Group stage (Group A)	(Denmark) Team Esbjerg	29–32	24–34	6th place
2021–22	Champions League	Group stage (Group A)	(Croatia) RK Podravka Koprivnica	38–14	32–24	6th place
2021–22	Champions League	Playoffs	(France) Metz Handball	22–30	19–32	41–62
2025–26	EHF Champions League	Group A	(France) Metz Handball		29–38	
2025–26	EHF Champions League	Group A	(Norway) Storhamar HE	22–26		
2025–26	EHF Champions League	Group A	(Romania) Gloria Bistrița-Năsăud	32–36	32–36	
2025–26	EHF Champions League	Group A	(Denmark) Team Esbjerg		29–36	
2025–26	EHF Champions League	Group A	(Hungary) Győri ETO KC	30–43		
2025–26	EHF Champions League	Group A	(Montenegro) OTP Group Budućnost	30–24		
2025–26	EHF Champions League	Group A	(Hungary) DVSC Schaeffler	28–26		

=== EHF European League (EHF Cup) ===
Season	Competition	Round	Club	1st leg	2nd leg	Aggregate
1996–97	EHF Cup	Qualifying Round	(North Macedonia) RK Pelister	31–18	21–19	52–37
1996–97	EHF Cup	Round of 16	(Norway) Bækkelagets SK	23–22	23–23	46–45
1996–97	EHF Cup	Quarter-finals	(Ukraine) Automobilist Brovary	31–23	40–20	71–43
1996–97	EHF Cup	Semifinals	(Romania) Otelul Galați	26–26	19–20	45–36
1996–97	EHF Cup	Final	(Slovenia) Olimpija Ljubljana	30–26	18–26	48–52
1998–99	EHF Cup	Qualifying Round	(France) ASU Lyon Vaulx en Velin	34–15	27–20	61–35
1998–99	EHF Cup	Round of 16	(Greece) A.C. Filippos Verias	35–17	30–13	65–30
1998–99	EHF Cup	Quarter-finals	(Denmark) Viborg HK	21–29	24–31	45–60
1999–00	EHF Cup	Round of 16	(Ukraine) Automobilist Brovary	29–27	35–30	64–57
1999–00	EHF Cup	Quarter-finals	(France) ESBF Besançon	25–22	23–22	48–44
1999–00	EHF Cup	Semifinals	(Norway) Tertnes HE	25–25	22–25	47–50
2000–01	EHF Cup	Round 3	(Turkey) T.M.O. Ankara	24–20	19–25	43–45
2018–19	EHF Cup	Round 2	(Romania) HC Zalău	24–20	25–25	49–45
2018–19	EHF Cup	Round 3	(Romania) SCM Craiova	17–19	18–19	35–38
2022–23	EHF European League	Round 3	(Serbia) ŽRK Železničar Inđija	43–22	31–15	74–37
2022–23	EHF European League	Group A	(Norway) Molde Elite	33–32	32–24	1st
2022–23	EHF European League	Group A	(France) ESBF Besançon	31–21	30–27	1st
2022–23	EHF European League	Group A	(Hungary) Siófok KC	26–23	24–27	1st
2022–23	EHF European League	Quarter-finals	(France) Neptunes de Nantes	32–22	19–28	51–50
2022–23	EHF European League	Semifinal	(Denmark) Nykøbing Falster Håndbold	33–35		
2022–23	EHF European League	Third-place match	(Germany) Thüringer HC	28–23		
2023–24	EHF European League	Round 3	(Romania) HC Dunărea Brăila	24–25	22–27	46–52
2024–25	EHF European League	Round 3	(Czech Republic) DHK Baník Most	36–32	37–23	73–55
2024–25	EHF European League	Group B	(Denmark) Ikast Håndbold	30–27	25–29	3rd
2024–25	EHF European League	Group B	(Norway) Sola HK	29–28	30–32	3rd
2024–25	EHF European League	Group B	(Romania) SCM Râmnicu Vâlcea	31–31	27–32	3rd

=== EHF Cup Winners' Cup ===
Season	Competition	Round	Club	1st leg	2nd leg	Aggregate
1994–95	EHF Cup Winners' Cup	Round of 32	(Slovakia) SC Impex Topolniky	24–21	18–16	42–37
1994–95	EHF Cup Winners' Cup	Last 16	(Belarus) HC Universitet Gomel	36–23	29–18	65–41
1994–95	EHF Cup Winners' Cup	Quarter-finals	(Slovenia) RK Krim	24–24	28–20	52-44
1994–95	EHF Cup Winners' Cup	Semifinals	(Germany) TV Lützellinden	24–24	24–30	48-54
1997–98	EHF Cup Winners' Cup	Last 16	(Slovakia) HC Plastika Nitra	37–19	35–32	72–51
1997–98	EHF Cup Winners' Cup	Quarter-finals	(Ukraine) Brovary HC	29–23	35–25	64–48
1997–98	EHF Cup Winners' Cup	Semifinals	(Croatia) Kras Zagreb	27–21	24–32	51–53

=== EHF Challenge Cup ===
Season	Competition	Round	Club	1st leg	2nd leg	Aggregate
2002–03	EHF Challenge Cup	Round 3	(Romania) Universitatea Remin Deva	27–20	20–24	47–44
2002–03	EHF Challenge Cup	Round 4	(Ukraine) HC Dnepryanka Kherson	30–23	27–12	57–35
2002–03	EHF Challenge Cup	Quarter-finals	(Greece) A.O. Thriamvos Ormi Patras	28–19	22–24	50–43
2002–03	EHF Challenge Cup	Semifinals	(Germany) DJK / MJC Trier	29–22	27–33	56–55
2002–03	EHF Challenge Cup	Final	(Romania) HC Selmont Baia Mare	24–16	21–27	43–45
2003–04	EHF Challenge Cup	Last 16	(Switzerland) Spono Nottwil	25–15	35–23	60–38
2003–04	EHF Challenge Cup	Quarter-finals	(Romania) Universitatea Remin Deva	29–27	29–33	58–60
