= Guro Nestaker =

Norwegian handball player (born 1998)

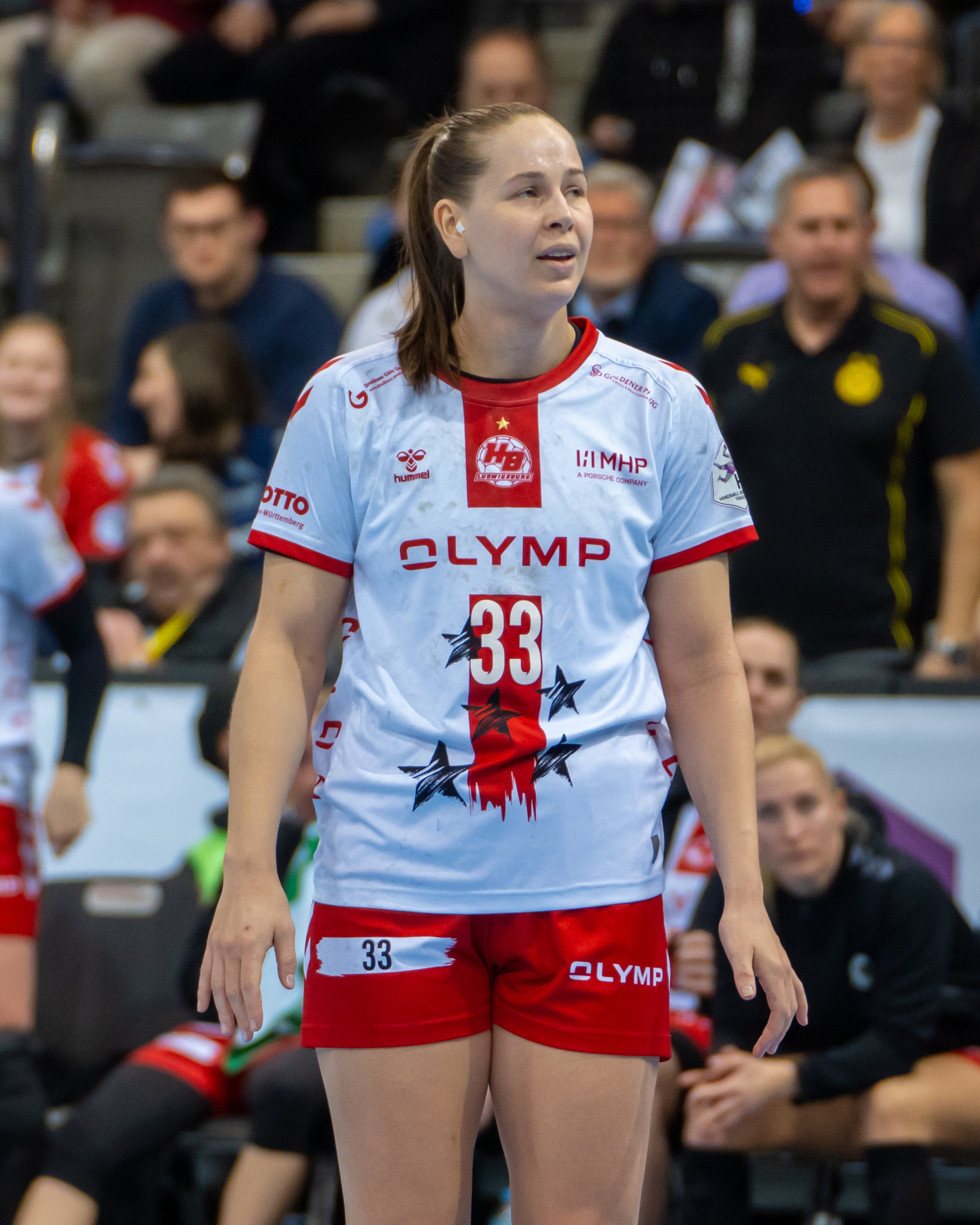
- Nestaker in 2025

Personal information
- Nationality: Norwegian
- Born: 15 August 1998 (age 28) Gjøvik, Norway
- Height: 1.81 m (5 ft 11 in)

Sport
- Sport: Handball
- Position: Left back
- Current club: Borussia Dortmund Handball
- Number: 33

Senior clubs
- Years: Team
- –2016: Gjøvik HK
- 2016–2018: Oppsal
- 2018–2024: Storhamar HE
- 2024–2025: HB Ludwigsburg
- 2025–: Borussia Dortmund Handball
National team
Years	Team	Apps	(Gls)
2019–	Norway	9	(15)
Medal record
Junior World Championship
Silver medal – second place	2018 Hungary
- Updated on 31 October 2025

Guro Nestaker (born 15 August 1998) is a Norwegian handball player for Borussia Dortmund Handball.

She also represented Norway at the 2015 European Women's U-17 Handball Championship, placing 11th and at the 2016 Women's Youth World Handball Championship, placing 4th.

== Achievements ==
- Junior World Championship:
  - Silver Medalist: 2018
- EHF European League:
  - Winner: 2023/2024
- Norwegian League:
  - Silver Medalist: 2018/2019, 2019/2020, 2020/2021, 2021/2022, 2022/2023, 2023/2024
- Norwegian Cup:
  - Finalist: 2018, 2019, 2023/2024

== Individual awards ==
- Best Defender of the 2016 Women's Youth World Handball Championship.
