= Nicole Wiggins =

Spanish handball player (born 2000)

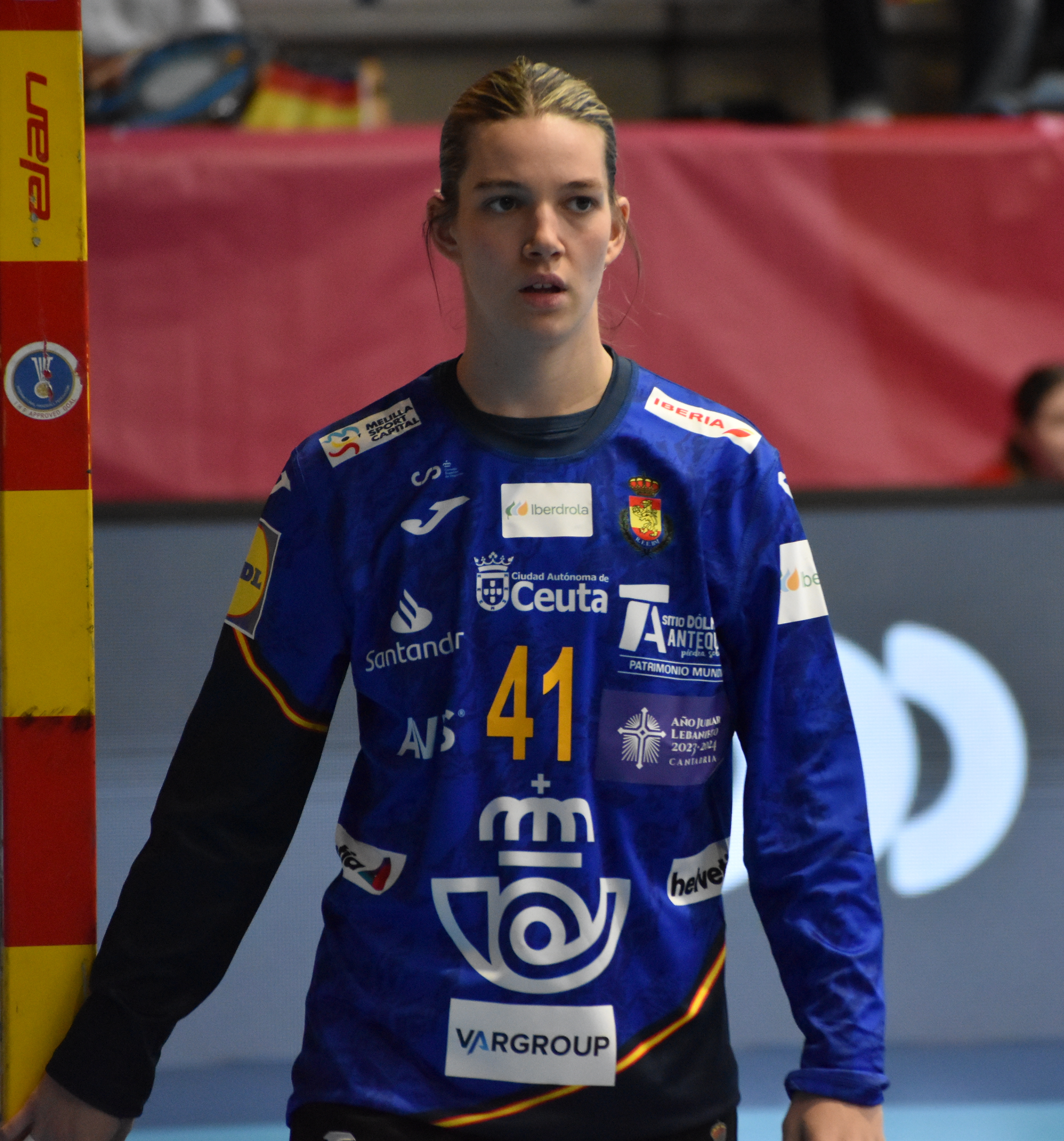

Personal information
- Full name: Nicole Wiggins Sancho
- Nationality: Spanish
- Born: 9 August 2000 (age 26) Madrid, Spain
- Height: 1.78 m (5 ft 10 in)

Sport
- Sport: Handball
- Position: Goalkeeper
- Current club: Borussia Dortmund
- Number: 11

Senior clubs
- Years: Team
- 2018–2023: BM Granollers
- 2023–2025: OGC Nice Côte d'Azur Handball
- 2025–2026: Super Amara Bera Bera
- 2026–: Borussia Dortmund
National team
| Years | Team | Apps | (Gls) |
| 2021– | Spain | 47 | (3) |
Medal record
Mediterranean Games
| Gold medal – first place | 2022 Oran | Team |
- Updated on 3 July 2026

Nicole Wiggins Sancho (born 9 August 2000) is a Spanish handball player for Borussia Dortmund in the Frauen-Bundesliga and the Spanish national team.

She represented Spain at the 2022 European Women's Handball Championship in Slovenia, Montenegro and North Macedonia.

On 23 December 2022, Wiggins signed a two-year contract with French OGC Nice Côte d'Azur Handball.

== Personal life ==
Wiggins was born in Spain to an English father and Dutch mother.
