= Kelly Vollebregt =

Dutch handball player (born 1995)

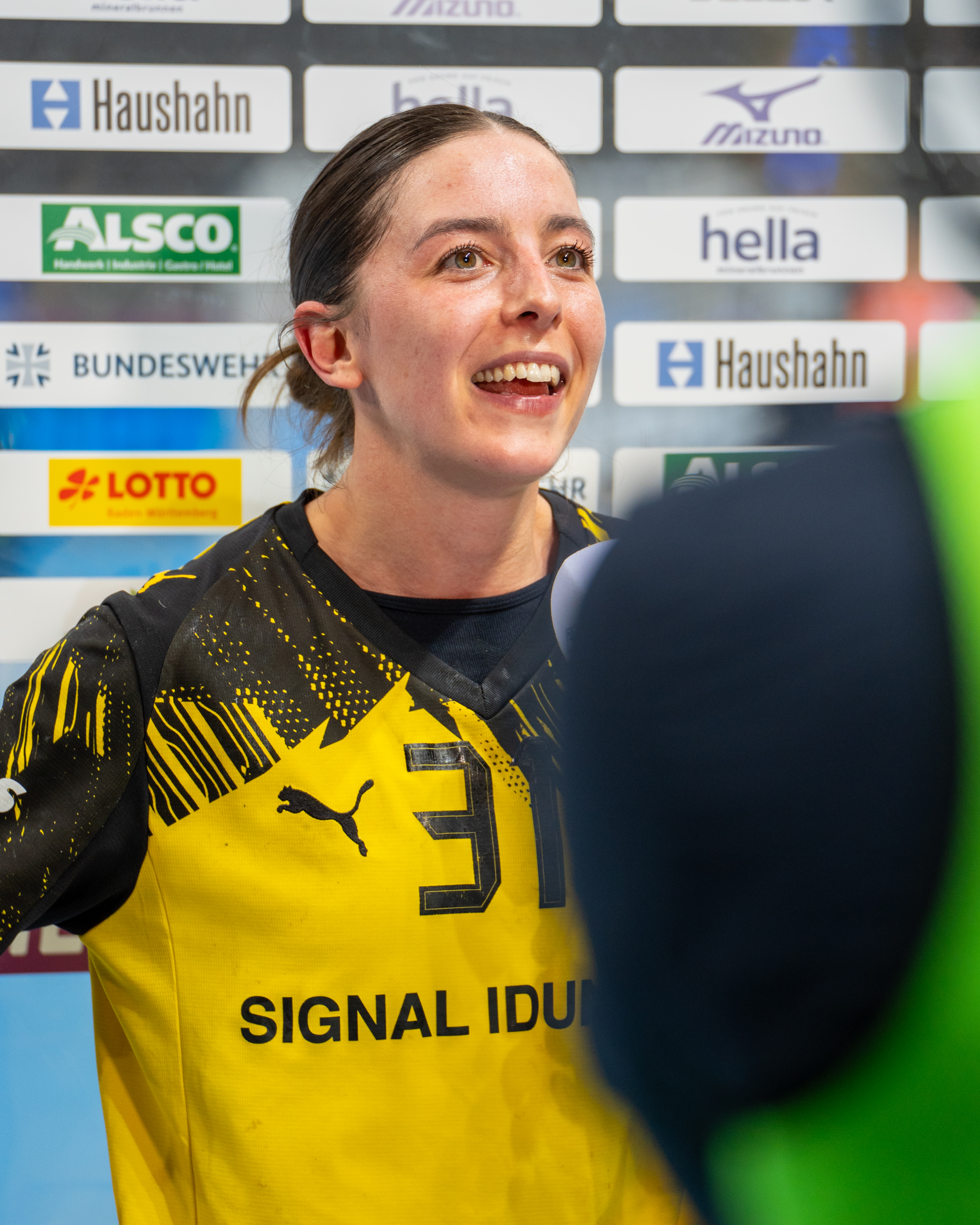
- Vollebregt in 2026

Personal information
- Nationality: Dutch
- Born: 1 January 1995 (age 31) Delft, Netherlands
- Height: 1.65 m (5 ft 5 in)

Sport
- Sport: Handball
- Position: Right wing
- Current club: Borussia Dortmund
- Number: 31

Senior clubs
- Years: Team
- –2013: Quintus
- 2013–2015: Vulkan-Ladies Koblenz/Weibern
- 2015–2019: TuS Metzingen
- 2019–2021: Borussia Dortmund
- 2021–2023: Odense Håndbold
- 2023–2024: Neptunes de Nantes
- 2024–: Borussia Dortmund
National team
Years	Team	Apps	(Gls)
2014-	Netherlands	46	(81)
- Updated on 1. november 2024

Kelly Vollebregt (born 1 January 1995) is a Dutch female handballer who plays for Borussia Dortmund and the Dutch national team.

From 2021 to 2023 she played for Danish club Odense Håndbold. Here she won the Danish League in 2021 and 2022.

== International honours ==
- EHF Cup:
  - Finalist: 2016
  - Semifinalist: 2017

== Individual awards ==
- All-Star Right Wing of the Junior European Championship: 2013
