= Molde Elite =

Norwegian handball club

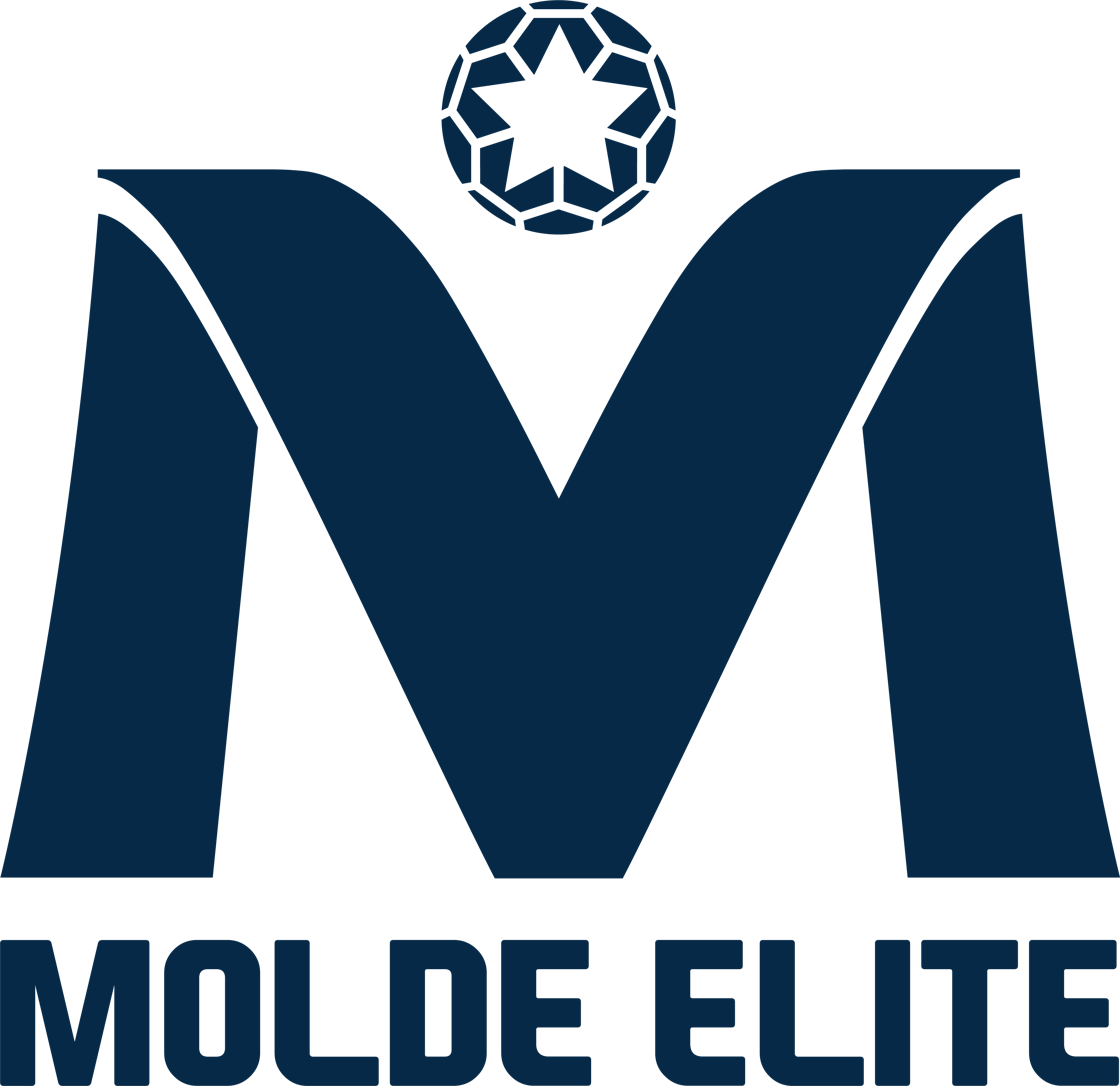
- Short name: Molde Elite
- Founded: 20 January 1961; 65 years ago (as Molde HK)
- Arena: Molde Arena
- Capacity: 2,000
- President: Per Gjerde
- Head coach: Tor Odvar Moen
- League: REMA 1000-ligaen
- 2025–26: 3rd
- Club colours
Home	Away

Molde Elite (or Molde HK Elite) is the women's elite team from the handball club Molde Håndballklubb, from Molde Municipality, Møre og Romsdal, Norway. The women's team currently competes in REMA 1000-ligaen, the Top Division.

== Achievements ==
- REMA 1000-ligaen
  - Bronze: 2025/26
- Norwegian Cup:
  - Finalist: 2021

== Team ==
=== Current squad ===
Squad for the 2026–27 season

Goalkeeper

- 1 (Norway) Eli Smørgrav Skogstrand
- 12 (Sweden) Christina Lövgren Hallberg
- 16 (Norway) Christine Neumann Strøm
- 24 (Norway) Lise Slemmen Gussiås

RW

- 2 (Norway) Mia Kristine Strand (maternity leave)
- 9 (Sweden) Clara Petersson Bergsten

LW

- 5 (Norway) Anniken Wollik (pregnant)
- 8 (Norway) Selin Kamburce
- 18 (Norway) Torine Hjelme Dalen

Line players

- 10 (Norway) Sherin Obaidli
- 26 (Norway) Kaja Røhne

Back players
LB

- 10 (Norway) Lene Kristiansen Tveiten
- 13 (Norway) Kristin Loraas Eiriksson
- 19 (Norway) Mira Ytterland Elnæs
- 25 (Norway) Tonje Løseth
- 27 (Denmark) Olivia Simonsen

CB

- 22 (Norway) Anniken Obaidli (c)

RB

- 7 (Norway) Johanne Halseth Nypan
- 56 (Norway) Vilde Ellingseter

=== Transfers ===
Transfers for the 2027–28 season.

Joining

- (Norway) Kenneth Gabrielsen (Head coach) (from (Norway) Storhamar HE)

Leaving

- (Norway) Raymond Hamar (Head coach) (to (Norway) Storhamar HE)

=== Technical staff ===
- Head coach: Raymond Hamar
- Assistant coach: Ola Paulsen Snekkerhaugen
- Assistant coach: Tonje Løseth

=== Notable former national team players ===
- (Argentina) Elke Karsten
- (Austria) Petra Blazek
- (Austria) Kristina Logvin
- (Belarus) Iryna Tryzno
- (Belarus) Katsiaryna Silitskaya
- (Brazil) Dayane Rocha
- (Croatia) Nataša Janković
- (Czech Republic) Markéta Šustáčková
- (North Macedonia) Ivana Gakidova
- (Montenegro) Anastasija Marsenić
- (Netherlands) Martine Smeets
- (Netherlands) Annick Lipman
- (Norway) Isabel Blanco
- (Norway) Tine Kristiansen
- (Norway) Emilie Christensen
- (Norway) Emilie Hovden
- (Norway) Ragnhild Valle Dahl
- (Norway) Anniken Obaidli
- (Norway) Thale Rushfeldt Deila
- (Norway) Marie Davidsen
- (Japan) Sakura Hauge
- (Poland) Marlena Urbańska
- (Sweden) Jenny Carlson
- (Tunisia) Ines Khouildi

=== Notable former club players ===
- (Brazil) Mariane Oliveira Fernandes
- (Brazil) Caroline Martins
- (Denmark) Melanie Bak
- (Denmark) Hanne Frandsen
- (Denmark) Lærke Sofie Sørensen
- (Denmark) Mie Sørensen
- (Denmark) Sarah Paulsen
- (Denmark) Mathilde Berner Rømer
- (Hungary) Blanka Kajdon (2023–2024)
- (Netherlands) Lynn Molenaar
- (Netherlands) Talissa Sabrina Groen
- (Netherlands) Romé Celine Steverink
- (Norway) June Andenæs
- (Norway) Vera Bekken
- (Norway) Julie Nygård
- (Norway) Sara Møller
- (Norway) Hanne Nilsen Morlandstø
- (Norway) Rikke Skiri Østigård
- (Norway) Tonje Haug Lerstad
- (Norway) Kristin Halvorsen
- (Norway) Malene Aambakk
- (Norway) Mathilde Rivas Toft
- (Norway) Lone Vik
- (Norway) Hege Løken
- (Norway) Andrea Hanssen
- (Norway) Julie Lygren
- (Norway) Catharina Fiskerstrand Broch
- (Norway) Mona Obaidli
- (Norway) Elise Skinnehaugen
- (Norway) Synne Fossheim
- (Norway) Christine Karlsen Alver
- (Norway) Sherin Obaidli
- (Norway) Ine Karlsen Stangvik
- (Norway) Celina Vatne
- (Norway) Rikke Øyerhamn
- (Norway) Christine Glasø
- (Norway) Susanne Amundsen
- (Norway) Runa Heimsjø Sand
- (Norway) Julia Hessen
- (Norway) Julie Bøe Jacobsen
- (Norway) Henrikke Hauge Kjølholdt
- (Norway) Maja Muri
- (Norway) Ingeborg Tømmervåg
- (Romania) Anca Mihaela Stoica
- (Sweden) Sandra Wrede
- (Sweden) Fanny Elovson

== European record ==
Season	Competition	Round	Club	1st leg	2nd leg	Aggregate
2020–21	EHF European League	QR2	(Austria) Hypo Niederösterreich	28–19	30–21	58–40
2020–21	EHF European League	QR3	(Russia) Astrakhanochka	0–10		
2021–22	EHF European League	QR2	(Germany) Thüringer HC	35–32	26–28	61–60
2021–22	EHF European League	QR3	(France) Chambray Touraine Handball	27–30	25–35	52–65
2022–23	EHF European League	GP	(Germany) BV Borussia 09 Dortmund	33–32	24–32	4th place
2022–23	EHF European League	GP	(France) ES Besancon Feminin	29–41	32–35	4th place
2022–23	EHF European League	GP	(Hungary) Siófok KC	22–30	29–32	4th place
