= Storhamar HE =

Norwegian handball club

Storhamar Håndball Elite
- Full name: Storhamar Håndball Elite
- Short name: Storhamar
- Founded: 1935
- Arena: OBOS Arena, Hamar
- Capacity: 2,029
- President: Ola Andersen
- Head coach: Kenneth Gabrielsen
- League: REMA 1000-ligaen
- 2025–26: 2nd
- Club colours
Home	Away

Storhamar Håndball Elite is the professional women's handball team of the Norwegian multi-sports club Storhamar IL based in Hamar. The team plays in REMA 1000-ligaen, the top division in the country, since its promotion in 2016.

== History ==
Storhamar IL was founded in 1935 as Storhamar AIL, a workers' sports club which was a member of Arbeidernes Idrettsforbund.

In 2015 the team was relegated to the 1st Division due to bad economy, but the year after they were promoted again.

They competed in the 2022–23 Women's EHF Champions League, for the first time. In 2023-24 they became the first Norwegian club to win the EHF European League. In the 2024-25 season the club won their first ever Norwegian championship, and did so undefeated. The same season they actually won "the treble", meaning the series, the cup and the playoffs.

== Achievements ==
- REMA 1000-ligaen:
  - Winner: 2024/2025
  - Silver: 2018/2019, 2019/2020, 2020/2021, 2021/2022, 2022/2023, 2023/2024, 2025/2026
  - Bronze: 2007/2008, 2009/2010, 2011/2012, 2017/2018
- Norwegian Cup:
  - Winner: 2024, 2025
  - Finalist: 2018, 2019, 2023/2024
  - Bronze: 2022/2023
- EHF European League:
  - Winner: 2023/2024

== Team ==
=== Current squad ===
Squad for the 2026–27 season.

Goalkeeper

- 12 (Norway) Mia Stensland
- 30 (Norway) Eli Marie Raasok (c)

Wingers
LW

- 4 (Norway) Susanne Amundsen
- 10 (Norway) Kristin Venn

RW

- 6 (Norway) Malin Aune (pregnant)
- 20 (Norway) Isabell Nordstrand
- 28 (Montenegro) Anastasija Marsenić

Line players

- 14 (Norway) Monika Høistad Bruce
- 36 (Norway) Ane Høgseth
- 37 (Norway) Oda Mastad (c)

Back players
LB

- 19 (Norway) Celina Vatne
- 31 (Norway) Kjerstin Boge Solås

CB

- 11 (Norway) Tonje Enkerud
- 18 (Norway) Marte Juuhl Svensson
- 26 (Denmark) Christina Pedersen
- 29 (Norway) Ada Aalstad

RB

- 9 (Norway) Mathilde Rivas Toft (pregnant)
- 33 (Norway) Sanne Løkka Hagen

=== Transfers ===
Transfers for the 2026–27 season

Joining

- (Norway) Mia Stensland (GK) (from (Norway) Gjerpen Håndball)
- (Norway) Susanne Amundsen (LW) (from (Norway) Molde Elite)
- (Norway) Marte Juuhl Svensson (CB) (from (Norway) Romerike Ravens)
- (Denmark) Christina Pedersen (CB) (from (Norway) Larvik HK)
- (Montenegro) Anastasija Marsenić (RW) (from (Denmark) København Håndbold)
- (Norway) Ane Høgseth (P) (from (Denmark) Ikast Håndbold)
- (Norway) Monika Høistad Bruce (P) (from own rows)

Leaving

- (Norway) June Krogh (GK) (to (Romania) SCM Râmnicu Vâlcea)
- (Czech Republic) Veronika Malá (LW) (to (Romania) CS Gloria Bistrița)
- (Norway) Ingeborg Storbæk Monné (LW) (to (Norway) Fana)
- (Norway) Anniken Obaidli (CB) (to (Norway) Molde Elite)
- (Norway) Elise Skinnehaugen (RB)
- (Faroe Islands) Pernille Brandenborg (P) (to (Romania) CSM București)

Transfers for the 2027–28 season

Joining

- (Norway) Raymond Hamar (Head coach) (from (Norway) Molde Elite)

Leaving

- (Norway) Kenneth Gabrielsen (Head coach) (to (Norway) Molde Elite)

=== Technical staff ===
- Head coach: Kenneth Gabrielsen
- Assistant coach: Endre Fintland
- Team manager: Anders Amdahl
- Physio therapist: Mia Rebecka Sterud
- Manual therapist: Kjersti Gundersen

=== Notable former national team players ===
- (Norway) Heidi Tjugum
- (Norway) Anja Hammerseng-Edin
- (Norway) Heidi Løke
- (Norway) Betina Riegelhuth
- (Norway) Emilie Hovden
- (Norway) Maja Jakobsen
- (Norway) Olivia Lykke Nygaard
- (Norway) Tina Abdulla
- (Norway) June Krogh
- (Norway) Anniken Obaidli
- (Brazil) Chana Masson
- (Czech Republic) Veronika Malá
- (Denmark) Ann Grete Nørgaard
- (Faroe Islands) Pernille Brandenborg
- (Germany) Mia Zschocke
- (Hungary) Gabriella Juhász
- (Kosovo) Mirela Gjikokaj
- (Montenegro) Alma Hasanić Grizović
- (Poland) Aleksandra Zimny
- (Slovakia) Simona Szarková
- (Sweden) Olivia Löfqvist

=== Notable former club players ===
- (Norway) Ranveig Haugen
- (Norway) Marita Brennodden
- (Norway) Jeanett Svele
- (Norway) Maren Gundersen
- (Norway) Gina Lorentsen
- (Norway) Inger Senstad
- (Norway) Lene Jøranli
- (Norway) Marthe S. Johansen
- (Norway) Stine Lidén
- (Norway) Linn-Marie Birkeland
- (Norway) Lise Løke
- (Norway) Kamilla Sundmoen
- (Norway) Anne Kjersti Suvdal
- (Norway) Malene Aambakk
- (Norway) Tonje Haug Lerstad
- (Norway) Ellen Marie Folkvord
- (Norway) Sara Rønningen
- (Norway) Jeanett Kristiansen
- (Norway) Sofie Ege Grønlund
- (Norway) Stine Lidén
- (Norway) Guro Nestaker
- (Norway) Mathea Enger
- (Norway) Mia Svele
- (Norway) Line Ellertsen Heldal
- (Norway) Anna Klausen Jacobsen
- (Norway) Ingeborg Storbæk Monné
- (Denmark) Lise Binger
- (Poland) Izabela Duda
- (Poland) Daria Boltromiuk
- (Sweden) Cassandra Tollbring
- (Sweden) Elinore Johansson
- (Sweden) Moa Fredriksson

== Statistics ==
=== Top scorers in the EHF Champions League ===
Last updated on 14 November 2026

Rank	Name	Seasons played	Goals
1	(Norway) Anniken Obaidli	2	245
2	(Norway) Kristin Venn	4	100
2	(Norway) Kjerstin Boge Solås	3	100
4	(Norway) Mathilde Rivas Toft	3	99
5	(Norway) Tina Abdulla	2	91
6	(Norway) Maja Jakobsen	1	65
6	(Sweden) Olivia Löfqvist	2	65
8	(Norway) Ane Høgseth	3	52
9	(Czech Republic) Veronika Malá	1	51
10	(Norway) Sanne Løkka Hagen	2	50

=== Top scorers in the EHF European League ===
Last updated on 13 May 2024

Rank	Name	Seasons played	Goals
1	(Norway) Anniken Obaidli	2	130
2	(Norway) Guro Nestaker	3	96
3	(Norway) Emilie Hovden	2	94
4	(Norway) Kristin Venn	3	77
5	(Norway) Maja Jakobsen	3	66
6	(Norway) Betina Riegelhuth	2	47
7	(Norway) Ane Høgseth	2	44
8	(Norway) Tina Abdulla	1	37
9	(Norway) Mathilde Rivas Toft	1	35
10	(Sweden) Olivia Löfqvist	1	34

== European record ==
Season	Competition	Round	Club	1st leg	2nd leg	Aggregate
2018–19	EHF Cup	R2	(Norway) Byåsen HE	29–20	22–14	51–34
2018–19	EHF Cup	R3	(Hungary) Érd HC	32–27	28–29	60–56
2018–19	EHF Cup	Group Matches; Group A	(Denmark) Team Esbjerg	28–28	20–25	2nd place
2018–19	EHF Cup	Group Matches; Group A	(Germany) SG BBM Bietigheim	29–28	25–28	2nd place
2018–19	EHF Cup	Group Matches; Group A	(Romania) CS Măgura Cisnădie	28–23	26–18	2nd place
2018–19	EHF Cup	QF	(Hungary) Siófok KC	24–31	31–32	55–63
2019–20	EHF Cup	R2	(Poland) MKS Zagłębie Lubin	27–20	38–22	65–42
2019–20	EHF Cup	R3	(Norway) Tertnes HE	39–13	26–31	65–44
2019–20	EHF Cup	Group Matches; Group D	(Denmark) Herning-Ikast Håndbold	26–24	27–34	3rd place
2019–20	EHF Cup	Group Matches; Group D	(Russia) Lada Togliatti	28–33	31–27	3rd place
2019–20	EHF Cup	Group Matches; Group D	(Germany) SG BBM Bietigheim	33–32	27–28	3rd place
2020–21	EHF European League	R3	(Hungary) Alba Fehérvár KC	(walkover)		
2020–21	EHF European League	Group Matches; Group C	(Russia) HC Astrakhanochka	33–28	0–10	3rd place
2020–21	EHF European League	Group Matches; Group C	(Romania) CS Minaur Baia Mare	29–33	27–40	3rd place
2020–21	EHF European League	Group Matches; Group C	(Germany) Thüringer HC	32–30	36–41	3rd place
2021–22	EHF European League	R3	(Romania) SCM Gloria Buzău	31–27	26–26	57–53
2021–22	EHF European League	Group Matches; Group C	(Denmark) Herning-Ikast Håndbold	27–35	24–32	2nd place
2021–22	EHF European League	Group Matches; Group C	(Russia) HC Lada	34–29	30–25	2nd place
2021–22	EHF European League	Group Matches; Group C	(Romania) CS Măgura Cisnădie	28–33	35–18	2nd place
2021–22	EHF European League	QF	(Denmark) Viborg HK	31–33	37–38	68–71
2022–23	EHF Champions League	Group stage Group B	(Hungary) Győri Audi ETO KC	21–35	26–39	6th place
2022–23	EHF Champions League	Group stage Group B	(France) Metz Handball	22–31	24–26	6th place
2022–23	EHF Champions League	Group stage Group B	(Romania) CS Rapid București	25–27	29–36	6th place
2022–23	EHF Champions League	Group stage Group B	(Montenegro) ŽRK Budućnost Podgorica	23–24	25–27	6th place
2022–23	EHF Champions League	Group stage Group B	(Denmark) Team Esbjerg	25–35	25–34	6th place
2022–23	EHF Champions League	Group stage Group B	(Turkey) Kastamonu Bld. GSK	31–29	33–28	6th place
2022–23	EHF Champions League	Group stage Group B	(Croatia) RK Lokomotiva Zagreb	37–13	31–22	6th place
2022–23	EHF Champions League	Playoffs	(Denmark) Odense Håndbold	22–30	30–30	52–60
2023–24	EHF European League; Winner	R3	(Sweden) H 65 Höör	37–28	36–32	73–60
2023–24	EHF European League; Winner	Group Matches; Group A	(Croatia) Podravka Vegeta	19–23	31–22	1st place
2023–24	EHF European League; Winner	Group Matches; Group A	(Hungary) Praktiker-Vác	35–17	33–24	1st place
2023–24	EHF European League; Winner	Group Matches; Group A	(Denmark) Nykøbing Falster Håndbold	27–26	27–26	1st place
2023–24	EHF European League; Winner	Quarterfinals	(Germany) Thüringer HC	39–35	33–26	72–61
2023–24	EHF European League; Winner	SF	(France) Neptunes de Nantes	28–27		
2023–24	EHF European League; Winner	Final	(Romania) CS Gloria Bistrița	29–27		
2024–25	EHF Champions League	Group stage Group A	(Hungary) FTC-Rail Cargo Hungaria	21–27	25–26	6th place
2024–25	EHF Champions League	Group stage Group A	(France) Metz Handball	29–29	20–24	6th place
2024–25	EHF Champions League	Group stage Group A	(Romania) CSM București	28–32	21–32	6th place
2024–25	EHF Champions League	Group stage Group A	(Slovenia) RK Krim Mercator	23–25	29–28	6th place
2024–25	EHF Champions League	Group stage Group A	(Denmark) Nykøbing Falster Håndboldklub	33–28	22–22	6th place
2024–25	EHF Champions League	Group stage Group A	(Croatia) HC Podravka Vegeta	23–25	24–25	6th place
2024–25	EHF Champions League	Group stage Group A	(Romania) Gloria Bistrița	25–23	28–31	6th place
2024–25	EHF Champions League	Playoffs	(Denmark) Odense Håndbold	20–33	21–25	41–58
2025–26	EHF Champions League	Group stage Group A	(France) Metz Handball	24–27	27–29	7th place
2025–26	EHF Champions League	Group stage Group A	(Hungary) Győri ETO KC	23–40	25–32	7th place
2025–26	EHF Champions League	Group stage Group A	(Romania) Gloria Bistrița	26–29	30–34	7th place
2025–26	EHF Champions League	Group stage Group A	(Denmark) Team Esbjerg	24–30	33–39	7th place
2025–26	EHF Champions League	Group stage Group A	(Germany) Borussia Dortmund	26–22	30–31	7th place
2025–26	EHF Champions League	Group stage Group A	(Montenegro) OTP Group Budućnost	25–14	26–22	7th place
2025–26	EHF Champions League	Group stage Group A	(Hungary) DVSC Schaeffler	28–30	24–26	7th place
2026–27	EHF Champions League	Group stage Group B	(France) Metz Handball	23–32		
2026–27	EHF Champions League	Group stage Group B	(Germany) HSG Blomberg-Lippe	27–23		
2026–27	EHF Champions League	Group stage Group B	(Hungary) Győri ETO KC	20–30		
2026–27	EHF Champions League	Group stage Group B	(Denmark) Odense Håndbold	26–23		
2026–27	EHF Champions League	Group stage Group B	(Croatia) HC Podravka Vegeta	33–25		
2026–27	EHF Champions League	Group stage Group B	(Romania) CS Gloria Bistrița	26–33		
2026–27	EHF Champions League	Group stage Group B	(Denmark) Nykøbing Falster	31–25	18–26	
