= Andreea Chiricuță =

Romanian handball player (born 1994)

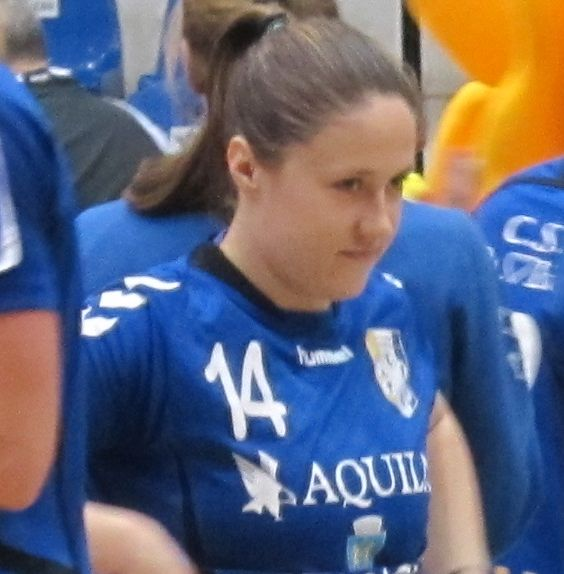

Personal information
- Full name: Andreea Eliza Chiricuță
- Nationality: Romanian
- Born: 27 February 1994 (age 32) Buzău, Romania
- Height: 1.66 m (5 ft 5 in)

Sport
- Sport: Handball
- Position: Left wing
- Current club: Rapid București

Youth career
- Years: Team
- –: Școala 181 SSP București

Senior clubs
- Years: Team
- 2015–2016: CSM Ploiești
- 2016–2017: Danubius Galați
- 2017–2020: Corona Brașov
- 2020–: Rapid București
National team
Years	Team	Apps	(Gls)
2016–	Romania	5	(7)
- Updated on 1 November 2017

Andreea Eliza Chiricuță (born 27 February 1994) is a Romanian handballer who plays as a left for Rapid București.
