= 2023–24 Women's EHF European League =

European handball tournament

Women's EHF European League
- 2023–24
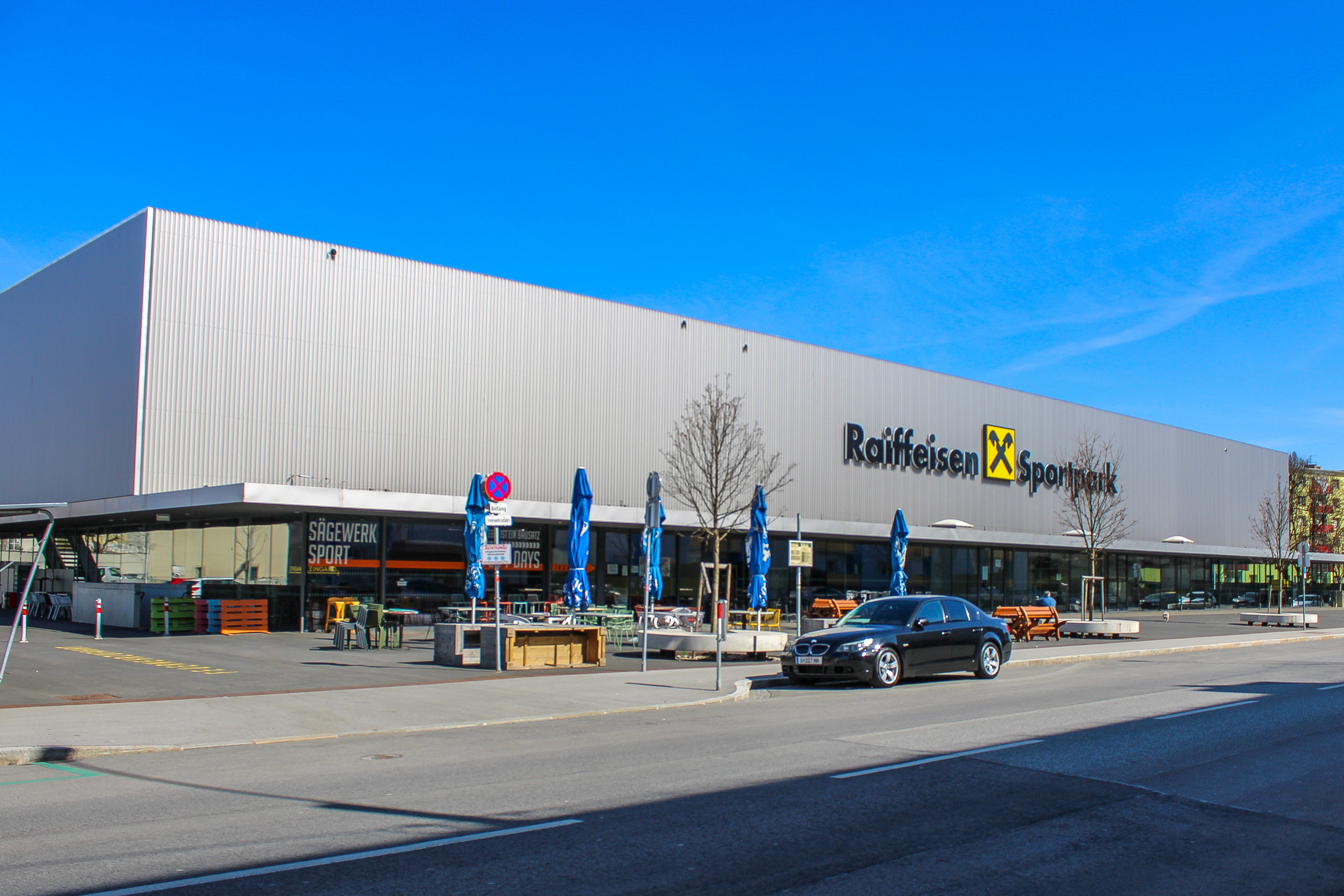
- The final four was held at the Raiffeisen Sportpark in Graz.

Tournament information
- Sport: Handball
- Dates: 23 September 2023–12 May 2024
- Teams: 34 (qualification stage); 16 (group stage)
- Website: ehfel.com

Final positions
- Champions: (Norway) Storhamar Håndball Elite (1st title)
- Runner-up: (Romania) CS Gloria Bistrița

Tournament statistics
- Matches played: 96
- Goals scored: 5,932 (61.79 per match)
- Attendance: 115,838 (1,207 per match)
- MVP: (Brazil) Renata Arruda
- Top scorer(s): (Norway) Anniken Obaidli (82 goals)

The 2023–24 Women's EHF European League is the 43rd edition of EHF's second-tier women's handball competition, running from 23 September 2023 to 12 May 2024.

Ikast Håndbold are the defending champions, but they won't be defending their title due to their involvement in this season's Champions League.

Storhamar Håndball Elite became the first Norwegian team to win the title, defeating Romanian side, CS Gloria Bistrița, in the final.

== Rankings ==
The rankings are based on the performances of each club from a respective country from a three year period. This season, the EHF decided to make separate rankings for each club competition.

- Associations 1–2 can have four clubs qualify.
- Associations 3–9 can have three clubs qualify.
- Associations 10–18 can have two clubs qualify.
- Associations 19–31 can have one club qualify.
- Associations below the top 31 can't participate in this competition.

Rank	Association	Average points	Teams
1	Denmark	101.00	2
2	Hungary	86.00	2
3	Germany	80.33	4
4	Romania	74.67	3
5	France	72.00	3
6	Russia	51.33	0
7	Croatia	47.00	2
8	Norway	46.00	4
9	Poland	37.00	1
10	Turkey	32.00	1
11	Czech Republic	19.00	1
12	Spain	18.00	2
13	Sweden	12.67	2
14	Serbia	8.00	2
15	Austria	4.67	1
16	Belarus	4.00	0

Rank	Association	Average points	Teams
16	Ukraine	4.00	0
18	Slovakia	3.67	0
19	Greece	3.67	1
20	Netherlands	2.67	0
21	Finland	1.50	0
21	Iceland	1.50	1
23	Switzerland	1.00	2
23	North Macedonia	1.00	0
23	Portugal	1.00	0
26	Luxembourg	0.50	0
27	Azerbaijan	0.33	0
27	Cyprus	0.33	0
27	Israel	0.33	0
27	Italy	0.33	0
27	Kosovo	0.33	0
32	(N/A) Everyone else	0.00	0

== Qualified teams ==
=== Team allocation ===
Group stage
(Denmark) Nykøbing Falster Håndbold (4th, CR)	(Germany) Thüringer HC (2nd)	(Hungary) Motherson Mosonmagyaróvár (4th)	(Romania) CS Gloria Bistrița (3rd)
Round 3
(Croatia) RK Lokomotiva Zagreb (1st)	(Croatia) Podravka Vegeta (2nd)	(Czech Republic) DHK Baník Most (2nd)	(Denmark) København Håndbold (6th (Note: 5th place Viborg HK declined))
(France) Neptunes de Nantes (3rd)	(France) Chambray Touraine HB (4th)	(Germany) Borussia Dortmund (3rd)	(Germany) HSG Bensheim/Auerbach (8th, CR)
(Hungary) Praktiker-Vác (5th)	(Norway) Storhamar Håndball Elite (2nd)	(Norway) Sola HK (3rd)	(Poland) MKS FunFloor Perła Lublin (2nd)
(Romania) CSM Târgu Jiu (10th, CR)	(Serbia) ŽORK Jagodina (1st)	(Spain) Super Amara Bera Bera (3rd)	(Sweden) H65 Höörs HK (2nd)
(Switzerland) LC Brühl Handball (1st)	(Turkey) Kastamonu Bld. GSK (1st)		
Round 2
(Austria) Hypo Niederösterreich (1st)	(France) JDA Bourgogne Dijon HB (5th)	(Germany) VfL Oldenburg (4th)	(Greece) AC PAOK (1st)
(Iceland) Valur (1st)	(Norway) Larvik HK (4th)	(Norway) Molde Elite (5th)	(Romania) HC Dunărea Brăila (4th)
(Serbia) ŽRK Železničar (2nd)	(Spain) Costa del Sol Malaga (1st)	(Sweden) Önnereds HK (3rd)	(Switzerland) SPONO Eagles (2nd)

== Round and draw dates ==
The schedule of the competition was as follows (all draws were held at the EHF headquarters in Vienna, Austria).

Phase	Round	Draw date	First leg	Second leg
Qualification	Second qualifying round	18 July 2023	23 September 2023	30 September 2023
Qualification	Third qualifying round	18 July 2023	11–12 November 2023	18–19 November 2023
Group stage	Matchday 1	23 November 2023	6–7 January 2024	
Group stage	Matchday 2	23 November 2023	13–14 January 2024	
Group stage	Matchday 3	23 November 2023	20–21 January 2024	
Group stage	Matchday 4	23 November 2023	3–4 February 2024	
Group stage	Matchday 5	23 November 2023	10–11 February 2024	
Group stage	Matchday 6	23 November 2023	17–18 February 2024	
Knockout phase	Quarter-finals	no draw	16–17 March 2024	23–24 March 2024
Knockout phase	Semi finals	26 March 2024	11 May 2024	
Knockout phase	Final	no draw	12 May 2024	

== Qualification stage ==
=== Round 2 ===
There were 12 teams participating in round 2. The first legs were played on 23 September and the second legs were played on 30 September–1 October 2023.

Seeding
Seeded	Unseeded
(Austria) Hypo Niederösterreich (Greece) AC PAOK (Iceland) Valur (Norway) Molde Elite (Spain) Costa del Sol Malaga (Serbia) ŽRK Železničar	(Germany) VfL Oldenburg (France) JDA Bourgogne Dijon HB (Romania) HC Dunărea Brăila (Norway) Larvik HK (Sweden) Önnereds HK (Switzerland) SPONO Eagles

Team 1	Agg.	Team 2	1st leg	2nd leg
VfL Oldenburg (Germany)	62–47	(Greece) AC PAOK	37–22	25–25
SPONO Eagles (Switzerland)	63–62	(Serbia) ŽRK Železničar	30–28	33–34
Larvik HK (Norway)	58–68	(Spain) Costa del Sol Malaga	31–35	27–33
Hypo Niederösterreich (Austria)	63–64	(Sweden) Önnereds HK	29–27	34–37 PS
Valur (Iceland)	43–60	(Romania) HC Dunărea Brăila	29–30	14–30
JDA Bourgogne Dijon HB (France)	52–75	(Norway) Molde Elite	29–35	23–40

=== Round 3 ===
There were 24 teams participating in round 3. The first legs were played on 11–12 November and the second legs were played on 18–19 November 2023.

Seeding
Seeded	Unseeded
(Denmark) København Håndbold (Hungary) Praktiker-Vác (Germany) Borussia Dortmund (France) Neptunes de Nantes (Romania) CSM Târgu Jiu (Norway) Storhamar Håndball Elite (Poland) MKS FunFloor Perła Lublin (Croatia) RK Lokomotiva Zagreb (Germany) HSG Bensheim-Auerbach (France) Chambray Touraine HB (Norway) Sola HK (Croatia) Podravka Vegeta	(Spain) Super Amara Bera Bera (Sweden) H65 Höörs HK (Turkey) Kastamonu Bld. GSK (Czech Republic) DHK Baník Most (Switzerland) LC Brühl Handball (Serbia) ŽORK Jagodina; Winner of Play off 1 Winner of Play off 2 Winner of Play off 3 Winner of Play off 4 Winner of Play off 5 Winner of Play off 6

Team 1	Agg.	Team 2	1st leg	2nd leg
HSG Bensheim/Auerbach (Germany)	55–44	(Germany) VfL Oldenburg	27–19	28–25
LC Brühl Handball (Switzerland)	43–53 (Note: Both matches were hosted by RK Lokomotiva Zagreb in Zagreb.)	(Croatia) RK Lokomotiva Zagreb	23–28	20–25
Praktiker-Vác (Hungary)	70–53	(Turkey) Kastamonu Bld. GSK	37–21	33–32
Borussia Dortmund (Germany)	46–52	(Romania) HC Dunărea Brăila	24–25	22–27
Storhamar Håndball Elite (Norway)	73–60	(Sweden) H65 Höörs HK	37–28	36–32
Chambray Touraine HB (France)	60–47	(Czech Republic) DHK Baník Most	33–20	27–27
SPONO Eagles (Switzerland)	43–58 (Note: Both matches were hosted by Podravka Vegeta in Koprivnica.)	(Croatia) Podravka Vegeta	17–26	26–32
Neptunes de Nantes (France)	75–52	(Norway) Molde Elite	45–28	30–24
Sola HK (Norway)	67–66	(Spain) Super Amara Bera Bera	39–32	28–34
Önnereds HK (Sweden)	50–55 (Note: Both matches were hosted by CSM Târgu Jiu, in Târgu Jiu.)	(Romania) CSM Târgu Jiu	27–29	23–26
ŽORK Jagodina (Serbia)	44–80	(Poland) MKS FunFloor Perła Lublin	20–36	24–44
Costa del Sol Malaga (Spain)	54–49	(Denmark) København Håndbold	29–29	25–20

== Group stage ==
Location of teams of the 2023–24 Women's EHF European League group stage.
Red: Group A; Blue: Group B; Yellow: Group C; Green: Group D.

The draw for the group phase was held on Thursday, 23 November 2023. In each group, teams played against each other in a double round-robin format, with home and away matches.

In the group stage, teams were ranked according to points (2 points for a win, 1 point for a draw, 0 points for a loss). After completion of the group stage, if two or more teams have scored the same number of points, the ranking will be determined as follows:

1. Highest number of points in matches between the teams directly involved;
2. Superior goal difference in matches between the teams directly involved;
3. Highest number of goals scored in matches between the teams directly involved;
4. Superior goal difference in all matches of the group;
5. Highest number of plus goals in all matches of the group;

This season, nine national associations are present. For the first time since the 2018–19 season, Spain has a qualified team, while Romania has the most teams in the group stage with three.

=== Group A ===
Pos	Team	Pld	W	D	L	GF	GA	GD	Pts	Qualification	STO	POD	NFH	VAC
1	(Norway) Storhamar Håndball Elite	6	5	0	1	169	138	+31	10	Quarterfinals	—	31–22	27–26	35–17
2	(Croatia) Podravka Vegeta	6	3	1	2	147	148	−1	7	Quarterfinals	23–19	—	25–23	27–24
3	(Denmark) Nykøbing Falster Håndbold	6	2	0	4	154	155	−1	4		26–27	23–22	—	32–27
4	(Hungary) Praktiker-Vác	6	1	1	4	147	176	−29	3		24–33	28–28	27–24	—

Source: EHF

=== Group B ===
Pos	Team	Pld	W	D	L	GF	GA	GD	Pts	Qualification	DUN	THC	CHA	LOK
1	(Romania) HC Dunărea Brăila	6	5	0	1	176	150	+26	10 (Note: HC Dunărea Brăila 61–55 Thüringer HC)	Quarterfinals	—	33–23	27–21	34–26
2	(Germany) Thüringer HC	6	5	0	1	173	146	+27	10	Quarterfinals	32–28	—	29–22	29–17
3	(France) Chambray Touraine HB	6	2	0	4	143	159	−16	4		19–24	25–32	—	27–25
4	(Croatia) RK Lokomotiva Zagreb	6	0	0	6	140	177	−37	0		29–30	21–28	22–29	—

Source: EHF

=== Group C ===
Pos	Team	Pld	W	D	L	GF	GA	GD	Pts	Qualification	GLO	NAN	BEN	LUB
1	(Romania) CS Gloria Bistrița	6	5	1	0	176	148	+28	11	Quarterfinals	—	19–19	33–24	26–23
2	(France) Neptunes de Nantes	6	3	1	2	190	171	+19	7	Quarterfinals	29–34	—	39–27	39–25
3	(Germany) HSG Bensheim/Auerbach	6	2	0	4	182	200	−18	4		27–35	37–30	—	35–29
4	(Poland) MKS FunFloor Perła Lublin	6	1	0	5	166	195	−29	2		26–29	29–34	34–32	—

Source: EHF

=== Group D ===
Pos	Team	Pld	W	D	L	GF	GA	GD	Pts	Qualification	SOL	MOS	COS	TAR
1	(Norway) Sola HK	6	5	0	1	195	164	+31	10	Quarterfinals	—	28–32	36–31	40–29
2	(Hungary) Motherson Mosonmagyaróvár	6	4	0	2	167	161	+6	8	Quarterfinals	29–34	—	25–23	33–27
3	(Spain) Costa del Sol Malaga	6	3	0	3	170	164	+6	6		22–26	29–26	—	30–26
4	(Romania) CSM Târgu Jiu	6	0	0	6	148	191	−43	0		21–31	20–22	25–35	—

Source: EHF

== Quarterfinals ==
Team 1	Agg.	Team 2	1st leg	2nd leg
Thüringer HC (Germany)	61–72	(Norway) Storhamar Håndball Elite	35–39	26–33
Podravka Vegeta (Croatia)	51–58	(Romania) HC Dunărea Brăila	26–32	25–26
Neptunes de Nantes (France)	70–57	(Norway) Sola HK	31–27	39–30
Motherson Mosonmagyaróvár (Hungary)	55–59	(Romania) CS Gloria Bistrița	30–32	25–27

=== Matches ===
17 March 2024; 16:00	Thüringer HC (Germany)	35–39	(Norway) Storhamar Håndball Elite	Salza-Halle, Bad Langensalza; Attendance: 1,400; Referees: Pagh, Pontoppidan (DEN)
17 March 2024; 16:00	Reichert 9	(17–19)	Obaidli 10	Salza-Halle, Bad Langensalza; Attendance: 1,400; Referees: Pagh, Pontoppidan (DEN)
17 March 2024; 16:00	1× (yellow card) 2× (suspension)	Report	1× (yellow card) 2× (suspension)	Salza-Halle, Bad Langensalza; Attendance: 1,400; Referees: Pagh, Pontoppidan (DEN)

23 March 2024; 16:00	Storhamar Håndball Elite (Norway)	33–26	(Germany) Thüringer HC	Boligpartner Arena, Hamar; Attendance: 1,321; Referees: Fukala, Muhyla (CZE)
23 March 2024; 16:00	Obadili 9	(15–9)	Rode 9	Boligpartner Arena, Hamar; Attendance: 1,321; Referees: Fukala, Muhyla (CZE)
23 March 2024; 16:00	1× (yellow card) 1× (suspension)	Report	1× (yellow card) 3× (suspension)	Boligpartner Arena, Hamar; Attendance: 1,321; Referees: Fukala, Muhyla (CZE)

16 March 2024; 16:00	Podravka Vegeta (Croatia)	26–32	(Romania) HC Dunărea Brăila	ŠSD "Josip Samaržija-Bepo", Koprivnica; Attendance: 1,200; Referees: Ilieva, Karbeska (MKD)
16 March 2024; 16:00	Mamić 10	(13–21)	Ježić 7	ŠSD "Josip Samaržija-Bepo", Koprivnica; Attendance: 1,200; Referees: Ilieva, Karbeska (MKD)
16 March 2024; 16:00	1× (suspension)	Report	2× (yellow card) 2× (suspension)	ŠSD "Josip Samaržija-Bepo", Koprivnica; Attendance: 1,200; Referees: Ilieva, Karbeska (MKD)

24 March 2024; 18:00	HC Dunărea Brăila (Romania)	26–25	(Croatia) Podravka Vegeta	Sala Sporturilor „Romeo Iamandi”, Buzău; Attendance: 1,700; Referees: Aghakishi, Aghakishi (AZE)
24 March 2024; 18:00	Ježić 7	(10–12)	Šimara 5	Sala Sporturilor „Romeo Iamandi”, Buzău; Attendance: 1,700; Referees: Aghakishi, Aghakishi (AZE)
24 March 2024; 18:00	3× (suspension)	Report	2× (yellow card) 2× (suspension)	Sala Sporturilor „Romeo Iamandi”, Buzău; Attendance: 1,700; Referees: Aghakishi, Aghakishi (AZE)

17 March 2024; 18:00	Neptunes de Nantes (France)	31–27	(Norway) Sola HK	Complexe Sportif Mangin-Beaulieu, Nantes; Attendance: 1,827; Referees: Yonchev, Yovchev (BUL)
17 March 2024; 18:00	Vollebregt 5	(16–15)	Holta 10	Complexe Sportif Mangin-Beaulieu, Nantes; Attendance: 1,827; Referees: Yonchev, Yovchev (BUL)
17 March 2024; 18:00	1× (yellow card) 2× (suspension)	Report	1× (yellow card) 3× (suspension)	Complexe Sportif Mangin-Beaulieu, Nantes; Attendance: 1,827; Referees: Yonchev, Yovchev (BUL)

24 March 2024; 16:00	Sola HK (Norway)	30–39	(France) Neptunes de Nantes	Stavanger Idrettshall, Stavanger; Attendance: 1,530; Referees: Bocakova, Janosikova (SVK)
24 March 2024; 16:00	Tveiten 6	(10–17)	Sajka 8	Stavanger Idrettshall, Stavanger; Attendance: 1,530; Referees: Bocakova, Janosikova (SVK)
24 March 2024; 16:00	1× (yellow card) 4× (suspension)	Report	1× (yellow card) 4× (suspension)	Stavanger Idrettshall, Stavanger; Attendance: 1,530; Referees: Bocakova, Janosikova (SVK)

16 March 2024; 20:00	Motherson Mosonmagyaróvár (Hungary)	30–32	(Romania) CS Gloria Bistrița	UFM Aréna, Mosonmagyaróvár; Attendance: 1,001; Referees: Duplii, Pobedrina (UKR)
16 March 2024; 20:00	Stranigg 6	(12–14)	Laslo 8	UFM Aréna, Mosonmagyaróvár; Attendance: 1,001; Referees: Duplii, Pobedrina (UKR)
16 March 2024; 20:00	1× (yellow card) 4× (suspension)	Report	2× (yellow card) 2× (suspension)	UFM Aréna, Mosonmagyaróvár; Attendance: 1,001; Referees: Duplii, Pobedrina (UKR)

23 March 2024; 14:00	CS Gloria Bistrița (Romania)	27–25	(Hungary) Motherson Mosonmagyaróvár	TeraPlast Arena, Bistrița; Attendance: 3,000; Referees: Puksic, Satler (SLO)
23 March 2024; 14:00	Laslo 9	(15–15)	Lancz 6	TeraPlast Arena, Bistrița; Attendance: 3,000; Referees: Puksic, Satler (SLO)
23 March 2024; 14:00	2× (suspension)	Report	3× (suspension)	TeraPlast Arena, Bistrița; Attendance: 3,000; Referees: Puksic, Satler (SLO)

== Final Four ==
The Final Four, (also known as the EHF Finals by the EHF), is held at the Raiffeisen Sportpark in Graz, Austria on 11 and 12 May 2024. The draw took place on 26 March 2024.

=== Bracket ===
Semifinals
11 May
(Romania) CS Gloria Bistrița	37
(Romania) HC Dunărea Brăila	26
11 May
(Norway) Storhamar HE	28
(France) Neptunes de Nantes	27

Final
12 May
(Romania) CS Gloria Bistrița	27
(Norway) Storhamar HE	29
Third place
12 May
(Romania) HC Dunărea Brăila	38
(France) Neptunes de Nantes	39

=== Semifinals ===
11 May 2024; 15:00	CS Gloria Bistrița (Romania)	37–26	(Romania) HC Dunărea Brăila	Raiffeisen Sportpark, Graz; Attendance: 1,650; Referees: Duplii, Pobedrina (UKR)
11 May 2024; 15:00	Laslo 9	(20–14)	Ježić 7	Raiffeisen Sportpark, Graz; Attendance: 1,650; Referees: Duplii, Pobedrina (UKR)
11 May 2024; 15:00	1× (yellow card) 6× (suspension)	Report	3× (suspension)	Raiffeisen Sportpark, Graz; Attendance: 1,650; Referees: Duplii, Pobedrina (UKR)

11 May 2024; 18:00	Storhamar Håndball Elite (Norway)	28–27	(France) Neptunes de Nantes	Raiffeisen Sportpark, Graz; Attendance: 1,450; Referees: Vranes, Wenninger (AUT)
11 May 2024; 18:00	Nestaker, Obaidli 9	(12–16)	Sajka 7	Raiffeisen Sportpark, Graz; Attendance: 1,450; Referees: Vranes, Wenninger (AUT)
11 May 2024; 18:00	3× (suspension)	Report	6× (suspension)	Raiffeisen Sportpark, Graz; Attendance: 1,450; Referees: Vranes, Wenninger (AUT)

=== Third place game ===
12 May 2024
15:00
HC Dunărea Brăila (Romania)
38–39
(France) Neptunes de Nantes
Raiffeisen Sportpark, Graz
Attendance: 1,600
Referees: Merisi, Pepe (ITA)
three players 6
(14–18)
Ondono, Sajka 6

Report
3× (suspension)

FT: 33–33 Pen: 5–6

=== Final ===
12 May 2024; 18:00	CS Gloria Bistrița (Romania)	27–29	(Norway) Storhamar Håndball Elite	Raiffeisen Sportpark, Graz; Attendance: 1,800; Referees: Ünlü, Simsek (TUR)
12 May 2024; 18:00	Lima, Laslo 6	(15–14)	Obaidli 9	Raiffeisen Sportpark, Graz; Attendance: 1,800; Referees: Ünlü, Simsek (TUR)
12 May 2024; 18:00	1× (yellow card) 3× (suspension) 2× (red card)	Report	2× (yellow card) 3× (suspension)	Raiffeisen Sportpark, Graz; Attendance: 1,800; Referees: Ünlü, Simsek (TUR)

== Top goalscorers ==
Rank	Player	Club	Goals
1	(Norway) Anniken Obaidli	(Norway) Storhamar HE	82
2	(Hungary) Csenge Kuczora	(Hungary) Praktiker-Vác	59
3	(France) Tamara Horacek	(France) Neptunes de Nantes	58
4	(Romania) Cristina Laslo	(Romania) CS Gloria Bistrița	57
5	(Croatia) Katarina Ježić	(Romania) HC Dunărea Brăila	55
6	(Norway) Camilla Herrem	(Norway) Sola HK	54
6	(Germany) Lucie-Marie Kretzschmar	(Germany) HSG Bensheim-Auerbach	54
8	(Serbia) Kristina Liščević	(Romania) HC Dunărea Brăila	51
8	(France) Oriane Ondono	(France) Neptunes de Nantes	51
10	(Norway) Kristina Novak	(Norway) Sola HK	50

== See also ==
- 2023–24 EHF Champions League
- 2023–24 EHF European League
- 2023–24 EHF European Cup
- 2023–24 Women's EHF Champions League
- 2023–24 Women's EHF European Cup
