= 2018–19 Eliteserien (women's handball) =

Eliteserien
- Season: 2018–19
- Champions: Vipers Kristiansand (2nd title)
- Relegated: Skrim Kongsberg; Rælingen HK
- Champions League: Vipers Kristiansand
- EHF Cup: Storhamar Elite; Tertnes Elite; Fredrikstad BK; Byåsen Elite
- Matches: 148
- Goals: 7,723 (52.18 per match)
- Top goalscorer: Ragnhild Valle Dahl (148 goals)
- Biggest home win: 30 goals: VIP 39–9 LHK
- Biggest away win: 21 goals: SKR 23–44 TER
- Highest scoring: 82 goals: VIP 42–40 STO
- All statistics correct as of 22 May 2019.

The 2018–19 Eliteserien is the 52nd season of the Eliteserien, Norway's premier handball league.

== Team information ==
A total of 12 teams will be participating in the 2018/19 edition of Eliteserien. 9 teams were qualified directly from the 2017/18 season. The two top ranked teams from the First Division, Fana and Skrim Kongsberg, and third-place finisher Rælingen HK who defeated Sola HK in the relegation playoff were promoted to the Eliteserien.

| Team | Town | Arena | Capacity | Clubs locations in Norway | Location of Bergen teams |
| Byåsen Elite | Trondheim | Trondheim Spektrum | 3400 | Clubs locations in Norway | Location of Bergen teams |
| Fana | Bergen | Fana Arena | 1206 | Clubs locations in Norway | Location of Bergen teams |
| Fredrikstad BK | Fredrikstad | Kongstenhallen | 1500 | Clubs locations in Norway | Location of Bergen teams |
| Gjerpen IF | Skien | Skienshallen | 2800 | Clubs locations in Norway | Location of Bergen teams |
| Larvik HK | Larvik | Boligmappa Arena Larvik | 4500 | Clubs locations in Norway | Location of Bergen teams |
| Molde Elite | Molde | Molde Arena | 2000 | Clubs locations in Norway | Location of Bergen teams |
| Oppsal | Oslo | Oppsal Arena | 5000 | Clubs locations in Norway | Location of Bergen teams |
| Rælingen HK | Rælingen | Marikollhallen | | Clubs locations in Norway | Location of Bergen teams |
| Skrim Kongsberg | Kongsberg | Kongsberghallen | | Clubs locations in Norway | Location of Bergen teams |
| Storhamar Elite | Hamar | Boligpartner Arena | 1650 | Clubs locations in Norway | Location of Bergen teams |
| Tertnes Elite | Bergen | Haukelandshallen | 5000 | Clubs locations in Norway | Location of Bergen teams |
| Vipers Kristiansand | Kristiansand | Aquarama | 2200 | Clubs locations in Norway | Location of Bergen teams |

== Regular season ==
=== Standings ===
| Pos | Team | Pld | W | D | L | GF | GA | GD | Pts | Qualification or relegation |
|---|---|---|---|---|---|---|---|---|---|---|
| 1 | Vipers Kristiansand | 22 | 21 | 0 | 1 | 722 | 465 | +257 | 42 | Championship play-offs + advance to Champions League |
| 2 | Storhamar Håndball Elite | 22 | 16 | 1 | 5 | 633 | 525 | +108 | 33 | Championship play-offs |
| 3 | Tertnes Håndball Elite | 22 | 15 | 1 | 6 | 573 | 507 | +66 | 31 | Championship play-offs |
| 4 | Larvik HK | 22 | 13 | 1 | 8 | 583 | 513 | +70 | 27 | Championship play-offs |
| 5 | Fredrikstad BK | 22 | 13 | 1 | 8 | 575 | 551 | +24 | 27 | Championship play-offs |
| 6 | Byåsen HE | 22 | 11 | 3 | 8 | 577 | 564 | +13 | 25 | Championship play-offs |
| 7 | Molde Elite | 22 | 10 | 3 | 9 | 539 | 541 | −2 | 23 | Championship play-offs |
| 8 | Oppsal | 22 | 8 | 0 | 14 | 550 | 602 | −52 | 16 | Championship play-offs |
| 9 | Fana | 22 | 5 | 1 | 16 | 561 | 627 | −66 | 11 | |
| 10 | Gjerpen HK Skien | 22 | 5 | 0 | 17 | 520 | 615 | −95 | 10 | Play-off against the third team from First Division |
| 11 | Skrim Kongsberg | 22 | 4 | 2 | 16 | 519 | 685 | −166 | 10 | Relegated to First Division |
| 12 | Rælingen HK | 22 | 3 | 3 | 16 | 509 | 666 | −157 | 9 | Relegated to First Division |

Updated to match(es) played on April 2018. Source:
Rules for classification: 1.) Points in head-to-head matches amongst tied teams; 2.) Goal difference in head-to-head matches amongst tied teams; 3.) Goals scored in head-to-head matches among tied teams; 4.) Points in all matches; 5.) Goal difference in all matches.

=== Results ===
In the table below the home teams are listed on the left and the away teams along the top.

| Home \ Away | BYÅ | FAN | FBK | GJE | LHK | MOL | OPP | RHK | SKR | STO | TER | VIP |
|---|---|---|---|---|---|---|---|---|---|---|---|---|
| Byåsen Elite | | 24–24 | 25–27 | 32–24 | 21–28 | 32–29 | 28–25 | 35–25 | 38–27 | 23–31 | 16–20 | 18–32 |
| Fana | 22–28 | | 23–34 | 26–24 | 20–19 | 20–25 | 28–25 | 27–23 | 27–28 | 22–35 | 22–25 | 25–36 |
| Fredrikstad BK | 20–28 | 29–28 | | 33–19 | 26–24 | 28–24 | 33–23 | 32–24 | 34–18 | 21–27 | 24–19 | 19–34 |
| Gjerpen HK Skien | 20–29 | 31–30 | 21–22 | | 23–28 | 18–26 | 30–34 | 33–20 | 23–18 | 18–27 | 22–25 | 22–34 |
| Larvik HK | 26–29 | 21–18 | 28–26 | 37–24 | | 23–19 | 31–18 | 31–19 | 36–19 | 28–28 | 29–25 | 24–25 |
| Molde Elite | 21–21 | 28–27 | 20–21 | 21–26 | 24–27 | | 25–22 | 26–26 | 37–29 | 23–28 | 28–28 | 25–19 |
| Oppsal | 22–27 | 29–27 | 23–28 | 23–18 | 21–32 | 21–23 | | 22–18 | 34–28 | 28–34 | 29–24 | 21–29 |
| Rælingen HK | 29–29 | 24–37 | 33–29 | 25–19 | 20–34 | 20–27 | 24–30 | | 27–27 | 11–34 | 23–25 | 31–45 |
| Skrim Kongsberg | 28–31 | 29–27 | 27–27 | 19–32 | 24–21 | 22–23 | 35–34 | 20–28 | | 19–33 | 23–44 | 22–34 |
| Storhamar Håndball Elite | 27–25 | 40–31 | 23–19 | 43–30 | 23–22 | 23–24 | 22–23 | 36–25 | 32–19 | | 22–15 | 19–30 |
| Tertnes Håndball Elite | 29–18 | 29–24 | 27–23 | 26–24 | 28–15 | 27–22 | 21–20 | 31–20 | 32–21 | 29–28 | | 20–22 |
| Vipers Kristiansand | 28–20 | 41–26 | 33–20 | 37–19 | 33–19 | 33–19 | 37–23 | 37–14 | 31–17 | 40–18 | 32–24 | |

Legend: Blue = home team win; Yellow = draw; Red = away team win.

== Championship playoffs ==
Best of three format is applied in all playoff stages, with the higher seeded team playing the second and third game (if necessary) at home. If a game ended with a draw after the regular time, it will proceed to two 5-minutes periods of extra time. If there is still a draw, another 2 × 5-minutes extra time will be played. If the scores are still level after two extra times, the winners are decided by a 7-meter shootout.

Top ranked teams from the regular season choose their opponents in the quarterfinal and semifinal stages. The remaining two highest ranked teams after the quarterfinal stage can not meet in the semifinals.

=== Bracket ===
Quarterfinals
1 | Vipers Kristiansand | 34 | 44
8 | Oppsal | 22 | 28
7 | Molde Elite | 24 | 17 | 22
4 | Larvik HK | 21 | 21 | 24
3 | Tertnes Håndball Elite | 37 | 24
5 | Fredrikstad BK | 28 | 20
6 | Byåsen Elite | 21 | 26
2 | Storhamar Håndball Elite | 26 | 29

Semifinals
1 | Vipers Kristiansand | 39 | 34
4 | Larvik HK | 9 | 17
3 | Tertnes Håndball Elite | 23 | 33 | 22
2 | Storhamar Håndball Elite | 25 | 30 | 33

Finals
1 | Vipers Kristiansand | 42 | 24
2 | Storhamar Håndball Elite | 40 | 23

=== Quarterfinals ===
| 23 April; 18:30 | Vipers Kristiansand | 34–22 | Oppsal | Aquarama, Kristiansand; Attendance: 1030; Referees: Varlo, Dasic |
| 23 April; 18:30 | Kristiansen 6 | (15–13) | Eklo 7 | Aquarama, Kristiansand; Attendance: 1030; Referees: Varlo, Dasic |
| 23 April; 18:30 | 2× (yellow card) 2× (suspension) | Report | 1× (yellow card) 2× (suspension) | Aquarama, Kristiansand; Attendance: 1030; Referees: Varlo, Dasic |

| 26 April; 18:30 | Oppsal | 28–44 | Vipers Kristiansand | Oppsal Arena, Oslo; Attendance: 377; Referees: Larsen, Johannessen |
| 26 April; 18:30 | Aune 9 | (13–19) | Sulland, Tomac 7 | Oppsal Arena, Oslo; Attendance: 377; Referees: Larsen, Johannessen |
| 26 April; 18:30 | 2× (yellow card) 1× (suspension) | Report | 2× (yellow card) | Oppsal Arena, Oslo; Attendance: 377; Referees: Larsen, Johannessen |

Vipers Kristiansand won series, 2–0.

| 23 April; 18:00 | Larvik HK | 21–24 | Molde Elite | Boligmappa Arena, Larvik; Attendance: 223; Referees: Kvakic, Eriksen |
| 23 April; 18:00 | Molid, Rivas Toft 5 | (12–14) | Dahl 9 | Boligmappa Arena, Larvik; Attendance: 223; Referees: Kvakic, Eriksen |
| 23 April; 18:00 | 2× (yellow card) 6× (suspension) | Report | 2× (yellow card) 2× (suspension) | Boligmappa Arena, Larvik; Attendance: 223; Referees: Kvakic, Eriksen |

| 26 April; 20:00 | Molde Elite | 17–21 | Larvik HK | Molde Arena, Molde; Attendance: 1205; Referees: Fjeldskår, Fjellvang |
| 26 April; 20:00 | Dahl 5 | (10–10) | Molid 6 | Molde Arena, Molde; Attendance: 1205; Referees: Fjeldskår, Fjellvang |
| 26 April; 20:00 | 2× (yellow card) 2× (suspension) | Report | 2× (yellow card) 2× (suspension) | Molde Arena, Molde; Attendance: 1205; Referees: Fjeldskår, Fjellvang |

| 28 April; 15:00 | Larvik HK | 24–22 | Molde Elite | Boligmappa Arena, Larvik; Attendance: 428; Referees: Johannessen, Larsen |
| 28 April; 15:00 | Bergum 10 | (12–10) | Obaidli 5 | Boligmappa Arena, Larvik; Attendance: 428; Referees: Johannessen, Larsen |
| 28 April; 15:00 | 2× (yellow card) 1× (suspension) | Report | 2× (yellow card) | Boligmappa Arena, Larvik; Attendance: 428; Referees: Johannessen, Larsen |

Larvik HK won series, 2–1.

| 23 April; 18:30 | Tertnes Håndball Elite | 37–28 | Fredrikstad BK | Haukelandshallen, Bergen; Attendance: 479; Referees: Larsen, Johannessen |
| 23 April; 18:30 | Sørheim 6 | (15–15) | Christiansen 6 | Haukelandshallen, Bergen; Attendance: 479; Referees: Larsen, Johannessen |
| 23 April; 18:30 | 3× (yellow card) 4× (suspension) | Report | 3× (yellow card) 1× (suspension) | Haukelandshallen, Bergen; Attendance: 479; Referees: Larsen, Johannessen |

| 26 April; 18:00 | Fredrikstad BK | 20–24 | Tertnes Håndball Elite | Kongstenhallen, Fredrikstad; Attendance: 307; Referees: Larsen, Launes |
| 26 April; 18:00 | Groa 4 | (11–13) | Stankiewicz 6 | Kongstenhallen, Fredrikstad; Attendance: 307; Referees: Larsen, Launes |
| 26 April; 18:00 | 3× (yellow card) 1× (suspension) | Report | 1× (yellow card) 1× (suspension) | Kongstenhallen, Fredrikstad; Attendance: 307; Referees: Larsen, Launes |

Tertnes Håndball Elite won series, 2–0.

| 23 April; 18:30 | Storhamar Håndball Elite | 26–21 | Byåsen Elite | Boligpartner Arena, Hamar; Attendance: 743; Referees: Martinsen, Tekaya |
| 23 April; 18:30 | Løke 9 | (10–10) | Aardahl 4 | Boligpartner Arena, Hamar; Attendance: 743; Referees: Martinsen, Tekaya |
| 23 April; 18:30 | 1× (yellow card) 2× (suspension) | Report | 2× (yellow card) 5× (suspension) | Boligpartner Arena, Hamar; Attendance: 743; Referees: Martinsen, Tekaya |

| 26 April; 18:00 | Byåsen Elite | 26–29 | Storhamar Håndball Elite | Trondheim Spektrum, Trondheim; Attendance: 459; Referees: Dasic, Varlo |
| 26 April; 18:00 | Alstad 9 | (15–13) | Skinnehaugen, Venn 6 | Trondheim Spektrum, Trondheim; Attendance: 459; Referees: Dasic, Varlo |
| 26 April; 18:00 | 3× (yellow card) 5× (suspension) | Report | 1× (yellow card) 4× (suspension) | Trondheim Spektrum, Trondheim; Attendance: 459; Referees: Dasic, Varlo |

Storhamar Håndball Elite won series, 2–0.

=== Semifinals ===
| 1 May; 17:00 | Vipers Kristiansand | 39–9 | Larvik HK | Aquarama, Kristiansand; Attendance: 1110; Referees: Kvakic, Eriksen |
| 1 May; 17:00 | Olsen 6 | (20–3) | Løwe 3 | Aquarama, Kristiansand; Attendance: 1110; Referees: Kvakic, Eriksen |
| 1 May; 17:00 | 2× (yellow card) | Report | 1× (yellow card) 1× (suspension) | Aquarama, Kristiansand; Attendance: 1110; Referees: Kvakic, Eriksen |

| 3 May; 18:00 | Larvik HK | 17–34 | Vipers Kristiansand | Boligmappa Arena, Larvik; Attendance: 243; Referees: Johannessen, Larsen |
| 3 May; 18:00 | Ramberg 8 | (9–17) | Refsnes 8 | Boligmappa Arena, Larvik; Attendance: 243; Referees: Johannessen, Larsen |
| 3 May; 18:00 | | Report | | Boligmappa Arena, Larvik; Attendance: 243; Referees: Johannessen, Larsen |

Vipers Kristiansand won series, 2–0.

| 1 May; 16:00 | Storhamar Håndball Elite | 25–23 | Tertnes Håndball Elite | Boligpartner Arena, Hamar; Attendance: 910; Referees: Martinsen, Tekaya |
| 1 May; 16:00 | Løke 7 | (13–11) | Solås 4 | Boligpartner Arena, Hamar; Attendance: 910; Referees: Martinsen, Tekaya |
| 1 May; 16:00 | 2× (yellow card) 2× (suspension) | Report | 1× (yellow card) 1× (suspension) | Boligpartner Arena, Hamar; Attendance: 910; Referees: Martinsen, Tekaya |

| 4 May; 18:15 | Tertnes Håndball Elite | 33–30 | Storhamar Håndball Elite | Fana Arena, Bergen; Attendance: 721; Referees: Isachsen, Hell |
| 4 May; 18:15 | Solås 8 | (14–16) | Venn 7 | Fana Arena, Bergen; Attendance: 721; Referees: Isachsen, Hell |
| 4 May; 18:15 | 2× (yellow card) 2× (suspension) | Report | 1× (yellow card) 2× (suspension) | Fana Arena, Bergen; Attendance: 721; Referees: Isachsen, Hell |

| 7 May; 19:15 | Storhamar Håndball Elite | 33–22 | Tertnes Håndball Elite | Boligpartner Arena, Hamar; Attendance: 1012; Referees: Nygren, Borge |
| 7 May; 19:15 | Riegelhuth 9 | (15–13) | Solås 5 | Boligpartner Arena, Hamar; Attendance: 1012; Referees: Nygren, Borge |
| 7 May; 19:15 | 2× (yellow card) 5× (suspension) | Report | 2× (yellow card) 4× (suspension) | Boligpartner Arena, Hamar; Attendance: 1012; Referees: Nygren, Borge |

Storhamar Håndball Elite won series, 2–1.

=== Finals ===
18 May
18:15
Vipers Kristiansand
42–40 (ET)
Storhamar Håndball Elite
Aquarama, Kristiansand
Attendance: 1590
Referees: Nygren, Borge
Refsnes 10
(17–18)
Nestaker 17
3× (yellow card) 5× (suspension) 1× (red card)
Report
2× (yellow card) 4× (suspension)

FT: 34–34 ET: 8–6

| 21 May; 19:15 | Storhamar Håndball Elite | 23–24 | Vipers Kristiansand | Boligpartner Arena, Hamar; Attendance: 1363; Referees: Isachsen, Hell |
| 21 May; 19:15 | Nestaker 8 | (11–14) | Arntzen, Aune, Sulland, Reistad 4 | Boligpartner Arena, Hamar; Attendance: 1363; Referees: Isachsen, Hell |
| 21 May; 19:15 | 3× (yellow card) 2× (suspension) | Report | 3× (yellow card) 3× (suspension) | Boligpartner Arena, Hamar; Attendance: 1363; Referees: Isachsen, Hell |

Vipers Kristiansand won the final series, 2–0.

2018–19 Eliteserien Champions
Vipers Kristiansand
2nd title

Eline Fagerheim, Katrine Lunde, Malin Aune, Carolina Morais, Karine Dahlum, Karoline Olsen, Vilde Jonassen, Sunniva Næs Andersen, Mathilde Kristensen, Pernille Wibe, Hanna Yttereng, Emilie Hegh Arntzen, Jeanett Kristiansen, Henny Reistad, Tonje Refsnes, Marta Tomac, Silje Waade, Linn Jørum Sulland (c), Josefine Intelhus
Head coach
Ole Gustav Gjekstad

== Awards ==
=== All Star Team and other awards ===
The All Star Team and other awards were announced on 14 June 2019.

| Position | Player |
|---|---|
| Goalkeeper | (Norway) Katrine Lunde (Vipers Kristiansand) |
| Left wing | (Norway) Kristin Venn (Storhamar HE) |
| Left back | (Norway) Ragnhild Valle Dahl (Molde Elite) |
| Centre back | (Norway) Henny Reistad (Vipers Kristiansand) |
| Right back | (Norway) Linn Jørum Sulland (Vipers Kristiansand) |
| Right wing | (Norway) Malin Aune (Vipers Kristiansand) |
| Pivot | (Norway) Vilde Johansen (Tertnes HE) |
| Rookie | (Norway) Christine Karlsen Alver (Fana) |
| MVP | (Norway) Henny Reistad (Vipers Kristiansand) |
| Player of the year | (Norway) Henny Reistad (Vipers Kristiansand) |
| Host | (Norway) Vipers Kristiansand |

== Season statistics ==
=== Top goalscorers ===
==== Regular season ====
As of the end of the regular season.

| Rank | Player | Club | Goals |
|---|---|---|---|
| 1 | (Norway) Ragnhild Valle Dahl | Molde Elite | 148 |
| 2 | (Norway) Madeleine Hilby | Tertnes HE | 133 |
| 3 | (Norway) Mari Molid | Larvik HK | 132 |
| 4 | (Norway) Emilie Hovden | Fana | 131 |
| 5 | (Norway) Christine Karlsen Alver | Fana | 128 |
| 6 | (Norway) Linn Jørum Sulland | Vipers Kristiansand | 122 |
| 7 | (Norway) Eira Aune | Oppsal | 120 |
| 8 | (Norway) Betina Riegelhuth | Storhamar HE | 114 |
| 9 | (Norway) Trine Haugstad | Skrim Kongsberg | 107 |
| 10 | (Norway) Cathrine Korvald | Skrim Kongsberg | 105 |

==== Playoffs ====
As of the end of the playoffs.

| Rank | Player | Club | Goals |
|---|---|---|---|
| 1 | (Norway) Guro Nestaker | Storhamar HE | 37 |
| 1 | (Norway) Heidi Løke | Storhamar HE | 37 |
| 3 | (Norway) Kristin Venn | Storhamar HE | 28 |
| 4 | (Norway) Tonje Enkerud | Storhamar HE | 26 |
| 5 | (Norway) Jeanett Kristiansen | Vipers Kristiansand | 25 |
| 6 | (Norway) Linn Jørum Sulland | Vipers Kristiansand | 24 |
| 7 | (Norway) Elise Skinnehaugen | Storhamar HE | 24 |
| 8 | (Norway) Kjerstin Boge Solås | Tertnes HE | 23 |
| 9 | (Norway) Emilie Hegh Arntzen | Vipers Kristiansand | 23 |
| 10 | (Norway) Henny Reistad | Vipers Kristiansand | 22 |
| 10 | (Norway) Betina Riegelhuth | Storhamar HE | 22 |

==== Overall ====
As of the end of the season.

| Rank | Player | Club | Goals |
|---|---|---|---|
| 1 | (Norway) Ragnhild Valle Dahl | Molde Elite | 165 |
| 2 | (Norway) Linn Jørum Sulland | Vipers Kristiansand | 146 |
| 3 | (Norway) Mari Molid | Larvik HK | 145 |
| 4 | (Norway) Madeleine Hilby | Tertnes HE | 142 |
| 5 | (Norway) Betina Riegelhuth | Storhamar HE | 136 |
| 6 | (Norway) Eira Aune | Oppsal | 134 |
| 7 | (Norway) Emilie Hovden | Fana | 131 |
| 8 | (Norway) Christine Karlsen Alver | Fana | 128 |
| 9 | (Norway) Jeanett Kristiansen | Vipers Kristiansand | 112 |
| 10 | (Norway) Trine Haugstad | Skrim Kongsberg | 107 |

=== Attendances ===
As of the end of the regular season.

| Pos | Team | Total | High | Low | Average | Change |
|---|---|---|---|---|---|---|
| 1 | Vipers Kristiansand | 14,893 | 1,914 (vs. Larvik) | 977 (vs. Rælingen HK) | 1,354 | -10,99% |
| 2 | Molde Elite | 11,697 | 1,420 (vs. Vipers) | 913 (two matches) | 1,063 | -0,08% |
| 3 | Tertnes Håndball Elite | 11,191 | 2,610 (vs. Fana) | 541 (vs. Oppsal) | 1,017 | +116,88% |
| 4 | Storhamar Håndball Elite | 10,723 | 1,589 (vs. Vipers) | 611 (vs. Fana) | 975 | -14,71% |
| 5 | Fana^{[1]} | 8,734 | 1,103 (vs. Larvik) | 520 (vs. Skrim) | 794 | +370,08% |
| 6 | Byåsen HE | 8,455 | 1,595 (vs. Vipers) | 525 (two matches) | 769 | -40,42% |
| 7 | Fredrikstad BK | 6,682 | 1,117 (vs. Larvik) | 201 (vs. Skrim) | 607 | -22,34% |
| 8 | Larvik HK | 5,686 | 668 (vs. Gjerpen) | 381 (vs. Oppsal) | 517 | -13,82% |
| 9 | Oppsal | 4,024 | 521 (vs. Vipers) | 125 (vs. Skrim) | 366 | -28,56% |
| 10 | Rælingen HK^{[1]} | 3,943 | 751 (vs. Vipers) | 192 (vs. Molde) | 358 | +39,77% |
| 11 | Skrim Kongsberg^{[1]} | 3,391 | 470 (vs. Vipers) | 159 (vs. Fredrikstad) | 308 | +1.74% |
| 12 | Gjerpen HK Skien | 3,268 | 625 (vs. Larvik) | 121 (vs. Molde) | 297 | -33,35% |
| Total | | 92,677 | 2610 (Tertnes vs. Fana) | 121 (Gjerpen vs. Molde) | 702 | -8,04% |

^{1} Teams that played last season in 1. divisjon.

Note: Attendance numbers without playoff matches.

=== Number of teams by regions ===
| No. teams | Region | Teams |
|---|---|---|
| 3 | Øst | Fredrikstad BK, Oppsal, Rælingen HK |
| 1 | Innlandet | Storhamar Håndball Elite |
| 3 | Sør | Gjerpen HK Skien, Larvik HK, Skrim Kongsberg |
| 1 | SørVest | Vipers Kristiansand |
| 2 | Vest | Fana, Tertnes Håndball Elite |
| 2 | Nord | Byåsen Elite, Molde Elite |

== Relegation playoff ==
| 24 April; 18:00 | Gjerpen HK Skien | 29–26 | Follo HK Damer | Skienshallen, Skien; Attendance: 347; Referees: Launes, Larsen |
| 24 April; 18:00 | Løvdal, Gulmark 7 | (13–8) | Magnus 6 | Skienshallen, Skien; Attendance: 347; Referees: Launes, Larsen |
| 24 April; 18:00 | 3× (yellow card) 1× (suspension) | Report | 2× (yellow card) | Skienshallen, Skien; Attendance: 347; Referees: Launes, Larsen |

| 28 April; 18:00 | Follo HK Damer | 21–22 | Gjerpen HK Skien | Langhus Hallen, Ski; Attendance: 502; Referees: Kvakic, Eriksen |
| 28 April; 18:00 | Magnus 6 | (15–9) | Løvdal 6 | Langhus Hallen, Ski; Attendance: 502; Referees: Kvakic, Eriksen |
| 28 April; 18:00 | 2× (yellow card) 3× (suspension) | Report | 2× (yellow card) 3× (suspension) | Langhus Hallen, Ski; Attendance: 502; Referees: Kvakic, Eriksen |

Gjerpen HK Skien won series, 2–0 and avoided from the relegation.
