= 2022–23 Norwegian Women's Handball Cup =

Handball tournament in Norway

Norwegian Handball Cup
Tournament information
- Sport: Handball
- Dates: August 10, 2022–February 26, 2023
- Teams: 67
- Website: Norwegian Handball Federation (NHF)

Final positions
- Champions: Vipers Kristiansand
- Runner-up: Sola

Tournament statistics
- Top scorer(s): Sara Berg (38 goals)

The 2022–23 Norwegian Handball Cup (Norwegian: NM (Norgesmesterskapet)) was the 56th edition of the national women's handball cup tournament. Vipers Kristiansand defended their title after winning the final against Sola HK.

If a game ends with a draw after the regular time, it will proceed to two 5-minutes periods of extra time. If there is still a draw, another 2 × 5-minutes extra time will be played. If the scores are still level after two extra times, the winner is decided by a 7-meter shootout.

== Round and draw dates ==
The schedule of the competition will be as follows (all draws are held at the NHF headquarters in Oslo, Norway).

Phase	Round	Draw date	Played before
Knockout phase	Round 1	June 29, 2022	August 17, 2022
Knockout phase	Round 2	June 29, 2022	August 31, 2022
Knockout phase	Round 3	June 29, 2022	September 21, 2022
Knockout phase	1/8-finals	September 26, 2022	October 19, 2022
Knockout phase	Quarterfinals	October 21, 2022	December 7, 2022
Final eight	Semi-finals	December 9, 2022	February 24, 2023
Final eight	Final	no draw	February 26, 2023

In April 2022 the Norwegian Handball Federation announced that for the first time in the competition's history, the winner of the Norwegian Handball Cup would be decided in a final four tournament called Final8. Final8 will be a tournament where both the women's and men's champion will be elected, as well as the junior champions. The event will take place at the Sparebanken Sør Amfi in Arendal, Norway on February 24–26, 2023.

== Knockout phase ==
=== Round 1 ===
The first round were scheduled to be played before August 17, 2022.

Team 1	Score	Team 2
Trøgstad HK	12–29	Halden
Stord	16–32	Åsane
Romsås	7–42	Rælingen
Bamble	20–33	Grane Arendal
Vikhammer HK	19–47	Utleira
Toten HK	20–24	Elverum

=== Round 2 ===
The second round were scheduled to be played before August 31, 2022.

Team 1	Score	Team 2
Eidsvold IF	14–38	Kjelsås
Halden	17–50	Larvik
Risør	18–31	Pors
Åsane	22–36	Tertnes Håndball Elite
NIT-HAK	19–35	Bærum Topphåndball
Bækkelaget Håndball Elite	14–40	Romerike Ravens
Tønsbergs Turn	17–24	Sandefjord
Gneist	32–27	Fyllingen
HK Rygge	23–27	Aker Topphåndball
Førde	13–47	Fana
Ørsta	9–51	Volda
Vålerenga	19–30	Follo HK Damer
Nord	8–33	Ålgård
Østsiden Fredrikstad	22–37	Sarpsborg
Rælingen	14–40	Flint Tønsberg
Godøy	18–45	Molde Elite
Tveter	14–49	Fredrikstad Bkl.
Skreia	15–33	LFH09
Ellingsrud	16–44	Nordstrand
Reistad	W.O.–0	Gjerpen HK Skien
Elverum	34–28	Gjøvik HK
Utleira	18–32	Byåsen Håndball Elite
Stavanger	16–46	Sola
Hokksund	26–36	Glassverket
Sotra	17–32	Tertnes
Linderud/Linje 5	17–48	Oppsal
Randesund	31–25	Grane Arendal
Sverresborg	12–37	Levanger

=== Round 3 ===
The third round were scheduled to be played before September 21, 2022.

Team 1	Score	Team 2
Sandefjord	22–36	Flint Tønsberg
Bærum Topphåndball	22–27	Aker Topphåndball
Tertnes	13–36	Sola
Elverum	22–49	Byåsen Håndball Elite
Nordstrand	24–39	Molde Elite
Kjelsås	20–33	Junkeren
Levanger	20–30	Volda
Ålgård	23–42	Fana
Gneist	22–46	Tertnes Håndball Elite
Randesund	26–38	Gjerpen HK Skien
LFH09	17–44	Romerike Ravens
Pors	11–45	Vipers Kristiansand
Glassverket	19–26	Larvik
Sarpsborg	17–34	Fredrikstad Bkl.

=== 1/8-finals ===
The fourth round were scheduled to be played before October 19, 2022.

Team 1	Score	Team 2
Junkeren	24–44	Storhamar Håndball Elite
Gjerpen HK Skien	26–36	Fredrikstad Bkl.
Romerike Ravens	21–30	Sola
Volda	23–29	Aker Topphåndball
Molde Elite	32–29	Follo HK Damer
Tertnes Håndball Elite	32–33 (a.e.t.)	Fana
Flint Tønsberg	25–39	Byåsen Håndball Elite
Larvik	22–40	Vipers Kristiansand

=== Quarterfinals ===
The fifth round is scheduled to be played on December 7, 2022.

Team 1	Score	Team 2
Fredrikstad Bkl.	24–40	Vipers Kristiansand
Fana	27–30	Sola
Aker Topphåndball	23–39	Storhamar Håndball Elite
Byåsen Håndball Elite	31–26	Molde Elite

== Final four ==
=== Bracket ===
Semifinals
February 24, 2023
Storhamar Håndball Elite	26
Sola	29
February 24, 2023
Byåsen Håndball Elite	29
Vipers Kristiansand	32

Final
February 26, 2023
Sola	23
Vipers Kristiansand	30

=== Semifinals ===
February 24, 2023; 17:00	Storhamar Håndball Elite	26–29	Sola	Sparebanken Sør Amfi, Arendal; Attendance: 1,568; Referees: Fjeldskår, Fjellvang (NOR)
February 24, 2023; 17:00	Nestaker, Obaidli 7	(13–15)	Deila 8	Sparebanken Sør Amfi, Arendal; Attendance: 1,568; Referees: Fjeldskår, Fjellvang (NOR)
February 24, 2023; 17:00	1× (yellow card) 4× (suspension) 1× (red card)	Report	1× (yellow card) 3× (suspension)	Sparebanken Sør Amfi, Arendal; Attendance: 1,568; Referees: Fjeldskår, Fjellvang (NOR)

February 24, 2023; 19:30	Byåsen Håndball Elite	29–32	Vipers Kristiansand	Sparebanken Sør Amfi, Arendal; Attendance: 1,598; Referees: Dasic, Husomanovic (NOR)
February 24, 2023; 19:30	Hjertner 7	(14–16)	Vyakhireva 9	Sparebanken Sør Amfi, Arendal; Attendance: 1,598; Referees: Dasic, Husomanovic (NOR)
February 24, 2023; 19:30	1× (yellow card) 4× (suspension)	Report	1× (yellow card) 3× (suspension)	Sparebanken Sør Amfi, Arendal; Attendance: 1,598; Referees: Dasic, Husomanovic (NOR)

=== Final ===
February 26, 2023; 13:45	Sola	23–30	Vipers Kristiansand	Sparebanken Sør Amfi, Arendal; Attendance: 2,000; Referees: Nygren, Borge (NOR)
February 26, 2023; 13:45	Deila, Magnussen 5	(12–14)	Vyakhireva 7	Sparebanken Sør Amfi, Arendal; Attendance: 2,000; Referees: Nygren, Borge (NOR)
February 26, 2023; 13:45	2× (suspension)	Report	3× (suspension)	Sparebanken Sør Amfi, Arendal; Attendance: 2,000; Referees: Nygren, Borge (NOR)
