= 2021–22 Women's EHF Champions League knockout stage =

The 2021–22 Women's EHF Champions League knockout stage began on 26 March with the playoffs and ended on 5 June 2022 with the final at the MVM Dome in Budapest, Hungary, to decide the winners of the 2021–22 Women's EHF Champions League. A total of twelve teams competed in the knockout phase.

== Format ==
In the playoffs, the eight teams ranked third to sixth in Groups A and B play against each other in two-legged home-and-away matches. The four winning teams advanced to the quarterfinals, where they were joined by the top-two teams of Groups A and B for another round of two-legged home-and-away matches. The four quarterfinal winners qualified for the final four tournament at the MVM Dome in Budapest, Hungary.

== Qualified teams ==
The top six teams from Groups A and B qualified for the knockout stage.

Group	Qualified for quarterfinals		Qualified for playoffs			
Group	First place	Second place	Third place	Fourth place	Fifth place	Sixth place
A	(Denmark) Team Esbjerg	(Russia) Rostov-Don	(Hungary) FTC-Rail Cargo Hungaria	(France) Brest Bretagne Handball	(Romania) CSM București	(Germany) BV Borussia 09 Dortmund
B	(Hungary) Győri Audi ETO KC	(Norway) Vipers Kristiansand	(France) Metz Handball	(Russia) CSKA Moscow	(Denmark) Odense Håndbold	(Slovenia) RK Krim Mercator

== Playoffs ==
=== Overview ===
Team 1	Agg.	Team 2	1st leg	2nd leg
RK Krim Mercator (Slovenia)	55–52	(Hungary) FTC-Rail Cargo Hungaria	33–26	22–26
BV Borussia 09 Dortmund (Germany)	41–62	(France) Metz Handball	22–30	19–32
Odense Håndbold (Denmark)	51–53	(France) Brest Bretagne Handball	25–24	26–29
CSM București (Romania)	20–0	(Russia) CSKA Moscow	10–0	10–0

All times are UTC+2 (matches on 26 March are UTC+1).

==== Matches ====
26 March 2022; 16:00	RK Krim Mercator (Slovenia)	33–26	(Hungary) FTC-Rail Cargo Hungaria	Arena Stožice, Ljubljana; Attendance: 700; Referees: Vranes, Wenninger (AUT)
26 March 2022; 16:00	Gros 13	(15–14)	Malestein 7	Arena Stožice, Ljubljana; Attendance: 700; Referees: Vranes, Wenninger (AUT)
26 March 2022; 16:00	1× (yellow card) 4× (suspension)	Report	6× (suspension) 1× (red card)	Arena Stožice, Ljubljana; Attendance: 700; Referees: Vranes, Wenninger (AUT)

2 April 2022; 16:00	FTC-Rail Cargo Hungaria (Hungary)	26–22	(Slovenia) RK Krim Mercator	Érd Aréna, Érd; Attendance: 2,200; Referees: Vujačić, Kažanegra (MNE)
2 April 2022; 16:00	Klujber 10	(8–10)	Gros, Posavec 4	Érd Aréna, Érd; Attendance: 2,200; Referees: Vujačić, Kažanegra (MNE)
2 April 2022; 16:00	1× (yellow card) 2× (suspension)	Report	1× (yellow card) 2× (suspension)	Érd Aréna, Érd; Attendance: 2,200; Referees: Vujačić, Kažanegra (MNE)

RK Krim Mercator won 55–52 on aggregate.

26 March 2022; 18:00	BV Borussia 09 Dortmund (Germany)	22–30	(France) Metz Handball	Helmut-Körnig-Halle, Dortmund; Attendance: 2,000; Referees: Hatipoğlu, Şimşek (TUR)
26 March 2022; 18:00	Grijseels 9	(9–18)	Nocandy 6	Helmut-Körnig-Halle, Dortmund; Attendance: 2,000; Referees: Hatipoğlu, Şimşek (TUR)
26 March 2022; 18:00	1× (yellow card) 1× (suspension)	Report	2× (yellow card) 2× (suspension)	Helmut-Körnig-Halle, Dortmund; Attendance: 2,000; Referees: Hatipoğlu, Şimşek (TUR)

2 April 2022; 18:00	Metz Handball (France)	32–19	(Germany) BV Borussia 09 Dortmund	Arènes de Metz, Metz; Attendance: 4,098; Referees: Christidi, Papamattheou (GRE)
2 April 2022; 18:00	Horacek, Valentini 5	(14–10)	Abdulla 4	Arènes de Metz, Metz; Attendance: 4,098; Referees: Christidi, Papamattheou (GRE)
2 April 2022; 18:00	2× (yellow card)	Report	2× (yellow card) 4× (suspension)	Arènes de Metz, Metz; Attendance: 4,098; Referees: Christidi, Papamattheou (GRE)

Metz Handball won 62–41 on aggregate.

27 March 2022; 16:00	Odense Håndbold (Denmark)	25–24	(France) Brest Bretagne Handball	Sydbank Arena Odense, Odense; Attendance: 1,784; Referees: Merz, Kuttler (GER)
27 March 2022; 16:00	Housheer 5	(13–12)	Fauske, Kobylińska 5	Sydbank Arena Odense, Odense; Attendance: 1,784; Referees: Merz, Kuttler (GER)
27 March 2022; 16:00	1× (yellow card) 1× (suspension)	Report	1× (yellow card) 5× (suspension)	Sydbank Arena Odense, Odense; Attendance: 1,784; Referees: Merz, Kuttler (GER)

3 April 2022; 16:00	Brest Bretagne Handball (France)	29–26	(Denmark) Odense Håndbold	Brest Arena, Brest; Attendance: 4,053; Referees: Covalciuc, Covalciuc (MDA)
3 April 2022; 16:00	Fauske 6	(14–14)	Aardahl, Højlund 6	Brest Arena, Brest; Attendance: 4,053; Referees: Covalciuc, Covalciuc (MDA)
3 April 2022; 16:00	2× (suspension)	Report	1× (yellow card) 4× (suspension)	Brest Arena, Brest; Attendance: 4,053; Referees: Covalciuc, Covalciuc (MDA)

Brest Bretagne Handball won 53–51 on aggregate.

Cancelled (Note: All Russian teams were excluded due to the Russian invasion of Ukraine.)	CSM București (Romania)	10–0	(Russia) CSKA Moscow

Cancelled	CSKA Moscow (Russia)	0–10	(Romania) CSM București

== Quarterfinals ==
=== Overview ===
Team 1	Agg.	Team 2	1st leg	2nd leg
CSM București (Romania)	52–53	(Denmark) Team Esbjerg	25–26	27–27
Brest Bretagne Handball (France)	44–56	(Hungary) Győri Audi ETO KC	21–21	23–35
Metz Handball (France)	20–0	(Russia) Rostov-Don	10–0	10–0
RK Krim Mercator (Slovenia)	49–65	(Norway) Vipers Kristiansand	25–32	24–33

==== Matches ====
1 May 2022; 16:00	CSM București (Romania)	25–26	(Denmark) Team Esbjerg	Polyvalent Hall, Bucharest; Attendance: 4,000; Referees: Konjičanin, Konjičanin (BIH)
1 May 2022; 16:00	Neagu 9	(9–12)	Breistøl 7	Polyvalent Hall, Bucharest; Attendance: 4,000; Referees: Konjičanin, Konjičanin (BIH)
1 May 2022; 16:00	2× (suspension)	Report	4× (suspension)	Polyvalent Hall, Bucharest; Attendance: 4,000; Referees: Konjičanin, Konjičanin (BIH)

8 May 2022; 16:00	Team Esbjerg (Denmark)	27–27	(Romania) CSM București	Blue Water Dokken, Esbjerg; Attendance: 3,100; Referees: Sekulić, Jovandić (SRB)
8 May 2022; 16:00	Breistøl 9	(12–14)	Neagu 7	Blue Water Dokken, Esbjerg; Attendance: 3,100; Referees: Sekulić, Jovandić (SRB)
8 May 2022; 16:00	3× (suspension)	Report	4× (suspension)	Blue Water Dokken, Esbjerg; Attendance: 3,100; Referees: Sekulić, Jovandić (SRB)

Team Esbjerg won 53–52 on aggregate.

30 April 2022; 18:00	Brest Bretagne Handball (France)	21–21	(Hungary) Győri Audi ETO KC	Brest Arena, Brest; Attendance: 4,094; Referees: Sá, Sá (POR)
30 April 2022; 18:00	Fauske 5	(11–8)	Kristiansen 6	Brest Arena, Brest; Attendance: 4,094; Referees: Sá, Sá (POR)
30 April 2022; 18:00	3× (suspension)	Report	2× (yellow card) 6× (suspension)	Brest Arena, Brest; Attendance: 4,094; Referees: Sá, Sá (POR)

7 May 2022; 16:00	Győri Audi ETO KC (Hungary)	35–23	(France) Brest Bretagne Handball	Audi Aréna, Győr; Attendance: 5,229; Referees: Bolic, Hurich (AUT)
7 May 2022; 16:00	Oftedal 9	(20–12)	Foppa, Løseth 5	Audi Aréna, Győr; Attendance: 5,229; Referees: Bolic, Hurich (AUT)
7 May 2022; 16:00	1× (yellow card) 3× (suspension)	Report	1× (suspension)	Audi Aréna, Győr; Attendance: 5,229; Referees: Bolic, Hurich (AUT)

Győri Audi ETO KC won 56–44 on aggregate.

Cancelled	Metz Handball (France)	10–0	(Russia) Rostov-Don

Cancelled	Rostov-Don (Russia)	0–10	(France) Metz Handball

1 May 2022; 14:00	RK Krim Mercator (Slovenia)	25–32	(Norway) Vipers Kristiansand	Arena Stožice, Ljubljana; Attendance: 1,800; Referees: Ilieva, Karbeska (MKD)
1 May 2022; 14:00	Gros 8	(10–14)	Debelić 8	Arena Stožice, Ljubljana; Attendance: 1,800; Referees: Ilieva, Karbeska (MKD)
1 May 2022; 14:00	1× (yellow card) 2× (suspension)	Report	3× (yellow card) 2× (suspension)	Arena Stožice, Ljubljana; Attendance: 1,800; Referees: Ilieva, Karbeska (MKD)

7 May 2022; 18:00	Vipers Kristiansand (Norway)	33–24	(Slovenia) RK Krim Mercator	Aquarama Kristiansand, Kristiansand; Attendance: 1,750; Referees: Antić, Jakovljević (SRB)
7 May 2022; 18:00	Dahl 6	(17–12)	Gros 8	Aquarama Kristiansand, Kristiansand; Attendance: 1,750; Referees: Antić, Jakovljević (SRB)
7 May 2022; 18:00	2× (yellow card) 4× (suspension)	Report	1× (yellow card) 2× (suspension) 1× (red card)	Aquarama Kristiansand, Kristiansand; Attendance: 1,750; Referees: Antić, Jakovljević (SRB)

Vipers Kristiansand won 65–49 on aggregate.

== Final four ==
The final four was held at the MVM Dome in Budapest, Hungary on 4 and 5 June 2022. The draw took place on 10 May 2022.

=== Bracket ===
Semi-finals
4 June
(Hungary) Győri Audi ETO KC	32
(Denmark) Team Esbjerg	27
4 June
(France) Metz Handball	27
(Norway) Vipers Kristiansand	33

Final
5 June
(Hungary) Győri Audi ETO KC	31
(Norway) Vipers Kristiansand	33
Third place
5 June
(Denmark) Team Esbjerg	26
(France) Metz Handball	32

=== Semifinals ===
4 June 2022; 15:15	Győri Audi ETO KC (Hungary)	32–27	(Denmark) Team Esbjerg	MVM Dome, Budapest; Attendance: 14,800; Referees: Vranes, Wenninger (AUT)
4 June 2022; 15:15	Oftedal 5	(15–15)	Reistad 8	MVM Dome, Budapest; Attendance: 14,800; Referees: Vranes, Wenninger (AUT)
4 June 2022; 15:15	5× (suspension)	Report	6× (suspension) 1× (red card)	MVM Dome, Budapest; Attendance: 14,800; Referees: Vranes, Wenninger (AUT)

4 June 2022; 18:00	Metz Handball (France)	27–33	(Norway) Vipers Kristiansand	MVM Dome, Budapest; Attendance: 14,800; Referees: Vujačić, Kažanegra (MNE)
4 June 2022; 18:00	De Paula 5	(15–14)	Jeřábková 12	MVM Dome, Budapest; Attendance: 14,800; Referees: Vujačić, Kažanegra (MNE)
4 June 2022; 18:00	2× (yellow card) 1× (suspension)	Report	2× (suspension)	MVM Dome, Budapest; Attendance: 14,800; Referees: Vujačić, Kažanegra (MNE)

=== Third place game ===
5 June 2022; 15:15	Team Esbjerg (Denmark)	26–32	(France) Metz Handball	MVM Dome, Budapest; Attendance: 12,000; Referees: Praštalo, Balvan (BIH)
5 June 2022; 15:15	Reistad 10	(12–18)	Zaadi 7	MVM Dome, Budapest; Attendance: 12,000; Referees: Praštalo, Balvan (BIH)
5 June 2022; 15:15	2× (yellow card) 5× (suspension)	Report	1× (yellow card) 4× (suspension)	MVM Dome, Budapest; Attendance: 12,000; Referees: Praštalo, Balvan (BIH)

=== Final ===
5 June 2022; 18:00	Győri Audi ETO KC (Hungary)	31–33	(Norway) Vipers Kristiansand	MVM Dome, Budapest; Attendance: 15,400; Referees: Merz, Kuttler (GER)
5 June 2022; 18:00	Hansen 6	(13–15)	Jeřábková 7	MVM Dome, Budapest; Attendance: 15,400; Referees: Merz, Kuttler (GER)
5 June 2022; 18:00	1× (yellow card) 1× (suspension)	Report	1× (yellow card) 2× (suspension)	MVM Dome, Budapest; Attendance: 15,400; Referees: Merz, Kuttler (GER)
