= Sunniva Næs Andersen =

Norwegian handball player (born 1996)

Sunniva Amalie Næs Andersen
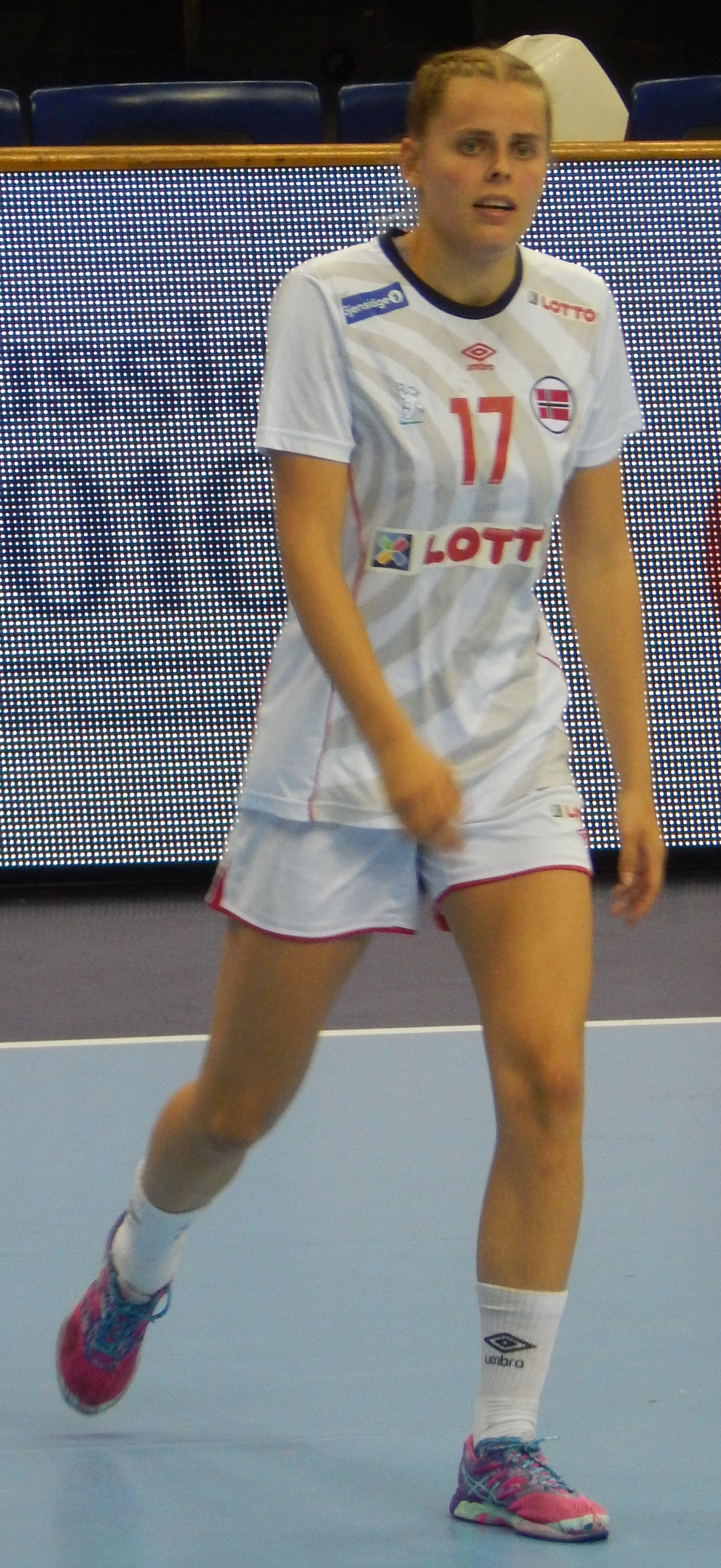

Personal information
- Nationality: Norwegian
- Born: 12 November 1996 (age 29) Skien, Norway
- Height: 1.75 m (5 ft 9 in)

Sport
- Sport: Handball
- Position: Left wing

Senior clubs
- Years: Team
- 2012–2017: Gjerpen IF
- 2017–01/2025: Vipers Kristiansand
National team
Years	Team	Apps	(Gls)
2021–2024	Norway	24	(56)
Medal record
European Championship
Gold medal – first place	2022 Slovenia/North Macedonia/Montenegro

Sunniva Næs Andersen (born 12 November 1996) is a retired Norwegian handball player, who last played for Vipers Kristiansand, until their bankruptcy and the Norwegian national team.

At the 2022 European Championship, she and Norway won gold. She also represented Norway at the 2016 Women's Junior World Handball Championship, placing 5th.

== National team ==
Andersen made her debut for the Norwegian National team onn 10 October 2021 against Slovenia.

Her only major international tournament was the 2022 European Championship, where she and Norway won gold. She played 8 matches and scored 10 goals during the tournament.

== Club career ==
Andersen started her career at her hometown club Gjerpen IF. In 2016 he helped them getting promoted to the Norwegian top division REMA 1000-Ligaen. In the following season, she was the topscorer for her team.

Due to lack of motivation, she decided to focus on her education, and therefore moved to Kristiansand. She was contacted by the Vipers Kristiansand head coach Kenneth Gabrielsen, when he learned that she had moved to Kristiansand. She then joined their second team Våg in the third tier of Norwegian handball. Due to injuries for wing players Vilde Kaurin Jonassen and Karoline Olsen she made her debut for Vipers in September 2017 against Byåsen IL, and a month later she played in the Champions League against Metz Handball. Later the same season she won both the Norwegian Cup and Championship with Vipers.

In the summer of 2018 she signed a permanent contract with Vipers. The following season she won her second double with the club. Later she won the EHF Champions League three times, in 2020/2021, 2021/2022, and 2022/2023.

She left the club in January 2025 when Vipers went bankrupt.

== Achievements ==
- European Championship:
  - Winner: 2022
- EHF Champions League:
  - Winner: 2020/2021, 2021/2022, 2022/2023
  - Bronze medalist: 2018/2019
- EHF Cup:
  - Finalist: 2018
- Norwegian League:
  - Winner: 2017/2018, 2018/2019, 2019/2020, 2020/2021, 2021/2022, 2022/2023, 2023/2024
- Norwegian Cup:
  - Winner: 2017, 2018, 2019, 2020, 2021, 2022/23, 2023/24
