= Deila =

Deila is a surname. Notable people with the surname include:

- Ingvild Deila (born 1987), Norwegian actress
- Live Rushfeldt Deila (born 2000), Norwegian handball player
- Ronny Deila (born 1975), Norwegian footballer and manager
- Thale Rushfeldt Deila (born 2000), Norwegian handball player
