= June Andenæs =

Norwegian handball player (born 1983)

Personal information
- Nationality: Norwegian
- Born: 9 June 1983 (age 43) Gloppen Municipality, Norway
- Height: 176 cm (69 in)

Sport
- Sport: Handball
- Position: Pivot

Youth career
- Years: Team
- 1995–1998: Fjellhug/Vereide IL

Senior clubs
- Years: Team
- 1998–2003: Gloppen HK
- 2003–2008: Bjørnar
- 2008–2011: Levanger HK
- 2011–2013: Byåsen HE
- 2013–2014: HC Lada
- 2015–2016: Molde Elite
- 2016–2017: Glassverket IF
- 2018–2019: Larvik HK
- 2019–2021: Vipers Kristiansand
National team
Years	Team	Apps	(Gls)
2010	Norway	1	(1)

June Andenæs (born 9 June 1983) is a retired Norwegian handball player, who last played for Vipers Kristiansand.

== Achievements ==
- EHF Champions League:
  - Winner: 2020/2021
- Norwegian League:
  - Winner: 2019/2020 (Vipers), 2020/2021 (Vipers)
  - Silver Medalist: 2011/2012 (Byåsen), 2012/2013 (Byåsen), 2013/2014 (Byåsen), 2017/2018 (Larvik)
  - Bronze Medalist: 2016/2017 (Glassverket)
- Norwegian Cup:
  - Winner: 2019, 2020
