= Karine Dahlum =

Norwegian handball player (born 1999)

Karine Emilie Dahlum
Personal information
- Nationality: Norwegian
- Born: 16 December 1999 (age 26) Kristiansand, Norway
- Height: 1.75 m (5 ft 9 in)

Sport
- Sport: Handball
- Position: Right back
- Current club: SønderjyskE
- Number: 8

Youth career
- Years: Team
- 2008–2016: IK Våg

Senior clubs
- Years: Team
- 2016–2024: Vipers Kristiansand
- 2024–: SønderjyskE
National team
| Years | Team | Apps | (Gls) |
| 2022– | Norway | 3 | (2) |

Karine Emilie Dahlum (born 16 December 1999) is a Norwegian handball player for SønderjyskE

Dahlum is also a part of Norway's national recruit team in handball.

In September 2023 Dahlum raptured her ACL during a league match against Gjerpen HK Skien, meaning she missed the entire season.

== Achievements ==
- EHF Champions League:
  - Winner: 2020/2021, 2021/2022, 2022/2023
  - Bronze medalist: 2018/2019
- EHF Cup:
  - Finalist: 2017/2018
- Norwegian League:
  - Winner: 2017/2018, 2018/2019, 2019/2020, 2020/2021, 2021/2022, 2022/2023
  - Silver medalist: 2016/2017
- Norwegian Cup:
  - Winner: 2017, 2018, 2019, 2020, 2021, 2022/23

== Personal life ==
She is the daughter of former international footballer Tore André Dahlum.
