= Emilie Christensen =

Norwegian handball player (born 1993)

Personal information
- Nationality: Norwegian
- Born: 13 April 1993 (age 33) Os Municipality, Norway
- Height: 1.76 m (5 ft 9 in)

Sport
- Sport: Handball
- Position: Centre back
- Current club: Glassverket IF

Senior clubs
- Years: Team
- –2013: Fana
- 2013–2017: Glassverket IF
- 2017–2019: Larvik HK
- 2019–2020: Ferencvárosi TC
- 2020–2021: Molde Elite
- 2022–: Glassverket IF
National team
Years	Team	Apps	(Gls)
2017–2018	Norway	15	(3)
Medal record
World Championship
Silver medal – second place	2017 Germany
Youth World Championship
Silver medal – second place	2010 Dominican Republic

Emilie Christensen (born 13 April 1993) is a Norwegian handball player for Norwegian Glassverket IF. She was on the Norwegian team that won silver medals at the 2017 World Women's Handball Championship

== Career ==
Christensen started her career at Fana IL in the Norwegian 1st division (second tier). In 2013 she joined first league team Glassverket IF, where she shared playing time with Nina Heglund and Tiril Merg. In 2017 she joined league rivals Larvik HK. In 2019 she joined Hungarian Ferencváros. Afterwards she joined Molde for a single season, before returning to Glassverket. Here she has since become the player-assistant manager.

Christensen represented Norway in the 2011 Women's Junior European Handball Championship, placing 12th.

On November 23rd she debuted for the Norwegian senior national team.

== Achievements ==
- World Championship:
  - Silver Medalist: 2017
- Norwegian League:
  - Bronze Medalist: 2015/2016, 2016/2017
  - Silver Medalist: 2014/2015
- Norwegian Cup:
  - Silver Medalist: 2016
- World Youth Championship:
  - Silver Medalist: 2010

== Individual awards ==
- All-Star Line Centre Back of Grundigligaen: 2016/2017
