= Elise Alsand =

Norwegian handball player (born 1972)

Personal information
- Full name: Elise Margrete Alsand-Larsen
- Nationality: Norwegian
- Born: 26 September 1972 (age 54)

Sport
- Sport: Handball
- Position: Left back, Centre back

Senior clubs
- Years: Team
- 1998-2001: Nordstrand IF
- 2003-2004: Våg
National team
Years	Team	Apps	(Gls)
1998–1999	Norway	13	(23)
Medal record
Representing Norway
Women's handball
European Championship
Gold medal – first place	1998 Netherlands	Team

Elise Alsand (born 26 September 1972) is a Norwegian team handball player who played for the clubs Nordstrand IF and Våg, and on the Norway women's national handball team. She became European champion in 1998.

Alsand made her debut on the national team in 1998.
