= Jeanett Kristiansen =

Norwegian handball player (born 1992)

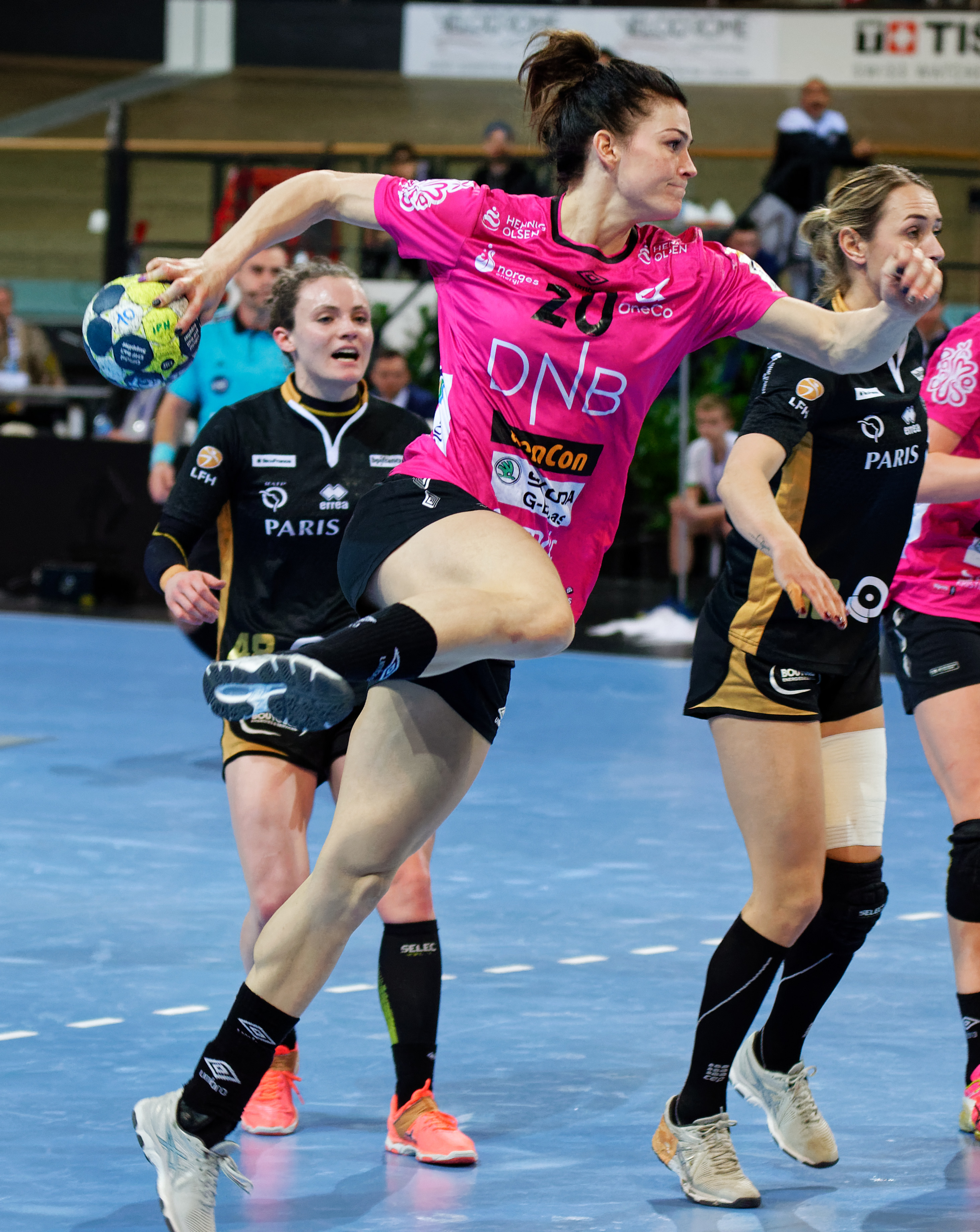
- Feb. 3, 2018

Personal information
- Full name: Jeanett Egebakken Kristiansen
- Nationality: Norwegian
- Born: 24 December 1992 (age 33) Drammen, Norway
- Height: 1.78 m (5 ft 10 in)

Sport
- Sport: Handball
- Position: Left back
- Current club: Follo HK Damer
- Number: 20

Senior clubs
- Years: Team
- ?-?: Mjøndalen IF
- 2010–2013: Glassverket IF
- 2013–2014: Larvik HK
- 2014–2016: Glassverket IF
- 2016–2019: Vipers Kristiansand
- 2019–2020: Herning-Ikast Håndbold
- 2020–2021: Vipers Kristiansand
- 2021–2022: Storhamar HE
- 2022–: Follo HK Damer
National team
Years	Team	Apps	(Gls)
2017–2018	Norway	6	(10)

Jeanett Kristiansen (born 24 December 1992) is a Norwegian handball player for Follo HK Damer.

She also represented Norway in the 2011 Women's Junior European Handball Championship, placing 12th, and in the 2012 Women's Junior World Handball Championship, placing 8th.

She is a younger sister of international handballer Veronica Kristiansen and handballer Charlotte Kristiansen.

== Achievements ==
- EHF Champions League:
  - Winner: 2020/2021
  - Bronze Medalist: 2018/2019
- EHF Cup:
  - Finalist: 2018
- Norwegian League:
  - Winner: 2013/2014 (Larvik), 2017/2018 (Vipers), 2018/2019 (Vipers), 2020/2021 (Vipers)
  - Silver Medalist: 2014/2015 (Glassverket), 2016/2017 (Vipers), 2021/2022 (Storhamar)
  - Bronze Medalist: 2015/2016 (Glassverket)
- Norwegian Cup:
  - Winner: 2013, 2017, 2018, 2020
  - Silver: 2015
- Danish Cup:
  - Winner: 2019
