= Veronica Kristiansen =

Norwegian handball player (born 1990)

Veronica Kristiansen Devecseri
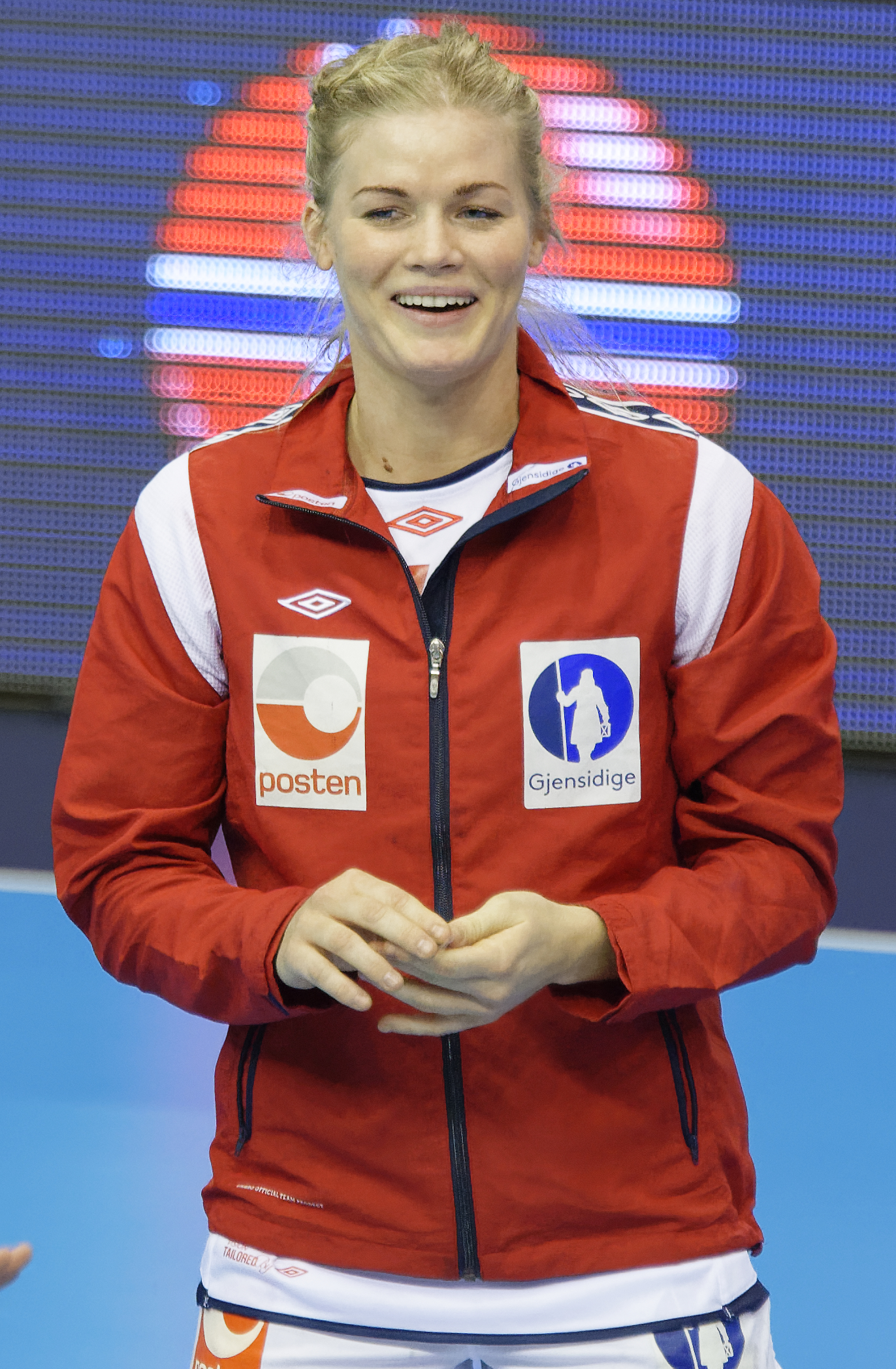
- Kristiansen in 2015

Personal information
- Full name: Veronica Kristiansen Devecseri
- Nationality: Norwegian
- Born: 10 July 1990 (age 36) Stavanger, Norway
- Height: 1.75 m (5 ft 9 in)

Sport
- Sport: Handball
- Position: Left back
- Current club: Győri ETO KC
- Number: 21

Senior clubs
- Years: Team
- 2006–2009: Mjøndalen IF
- 2009–2011: Vipers Kristiansand
- 2011–2015: Glassverket IF
- 2015–2018: FC Midtjylland
- 2018–2027: Győri ETO KC
National team
Years	Team	Apps	(Gls)
2013–	Norway	204	(635)
Medal record
Olympic Games
Gold medal – first place	2024 Paris	Team
Bronze medal – third place	2016 Rio de Janeiro	Team
Bronze medal – third place	2020 Tokyo	Team
World Championship
Gold medal – first place	2015 Denmark
Gold medal – first place	2021 Spain
Gold medal – first place	2025 Germany/Netherlands
Silver medal – second place	2017 Germany
European Championship
Gold medal – first place	2014 Croatia/Hungary
Gold medal – first place	2016 Sweden
Gold medal – first place	2020 Denmark
Junior World Championship
Gold medal – first place	2010 South Korea
Junior European Championship
Gold medal – first place	2009 Hungary

Veronica Kristiansen Devecseri (born 10 July 1990) is a Norwegian professional handball player for Győri ETO KC and the Norwegian national team.

She made her team Norway debut in 2013.

Her achievements include winning the EHF Champions League three times (with Győr), as well as three gold medals and one silver medal at the IHF World Women's Handball Championship, also has three victories in the European Women's Handball Championship, one Olympic gold medal, and two Olympic bronze medals.

== Career ==
=== Club career ===
Kristiansen played for the clubs Mjøndalen IF and Reistad IL, and then for IK Våg from 2009 to 2011. With Våg, she placed second in the Norwegian Cup in 2011. From 2011 to 2015, she played for Glassverket IF and placed second in the Norwegian League with Glassverket in 2015.

She played for the Danish club FC Midtjylland from 2015 to 2018, and won the Danish Cup with this club in 2015. From 2018 she played for the Hungarian club Győri ETO KC, winning the Hungarian Championship in 2018/2019. She also won the EHF Champions League with Győr in 2019 and 2024.

=== International career ===
Playing for the Norwegian national team, Kristiansen won a gold medal at the 2014 European Women's Handball Championship. She won a gold medal with Norway at the 2015 World Women's Handball Championship, defeating the Netherlands in the final. At the 2016 Summer Olympics she won a bronze medal with Norway, after losing the semifinal to Russia and winning the bronze final against the Netherlands.

At the 2016 European Women's Handball Championship in Sweden, she won a gold medal with the Norwegian team. She also played at the 2017 World Women's Handball Championship in Germany, when Norway won the silver medals.

She won another gold medal with Norway at the 2020 European Women's Handball Championship in Denmark. At the 2020 Summer Olympics held in 2021, she won the bronze medal with the Norwegian team. She won a gold medal with the Norwegian team at the 2021 World Women's Handball Championship.

At the 2025 World Championship she won her third World Cup gold medals.

== Achievements ==
=== National team ===
- Olympic Games:
  - Winner: 2024
  - Bronze Medalist: 2016, 2020
- World Championship:
  - Winner: 2015, 2021, 2025
  - Silver Medalist: 2017
- European Championship:
  - Winner: 2014, 2016, 2020
- Junior World Championship:
  - Winner: 2010
- Junior European Championship:
  - Winner: 2009

=== European ===
- EHF Champions League:
  - Winner: 2019, 2024, 2025
  - Finalist: 2022
  - Bronze medalist: 2021, 2023

=== Domestic ===
- Norwegian League:
  - Silver: 2014/2015
- Norwegian Cup:
  - Silver: 2010
- Danish Championship:
  - Silver: 2015/2016
  - Bronze: 2016/2017
- Danish Cup:
  - Winner: 2015
  - Finalist: 2016
- Hungarian Championship
  - Winner: 2019, 2022, 2023, 2025, 2026
- Hungarian Cup:
  - Winner: 2019, 2021

== Individual awards ==
- All-Star Left Back of Postenligaen: 2013/2014
- All-Star Centre Back of Damehåndboldligaen: 2017/2018
- Best Player of Damehåndboldligaen: 2017/2018
- All-Star Centre Back of the EHF Champions League: 2018

== Personal life ==
She is the elder sister of handballer Jeanett Kristiansen and the younger sister of handballer Charlotte Kristiansen.

She is married. Her husband, Hungarian Ádám Devecseri, is a former canoeist and later the physiotherapist of Győri ETO KC. They have two children together: Olivia (born 2023) and Odin (born 2025).
