= Ingvild Bakkerud =

Norwegian handball player (born 1995)

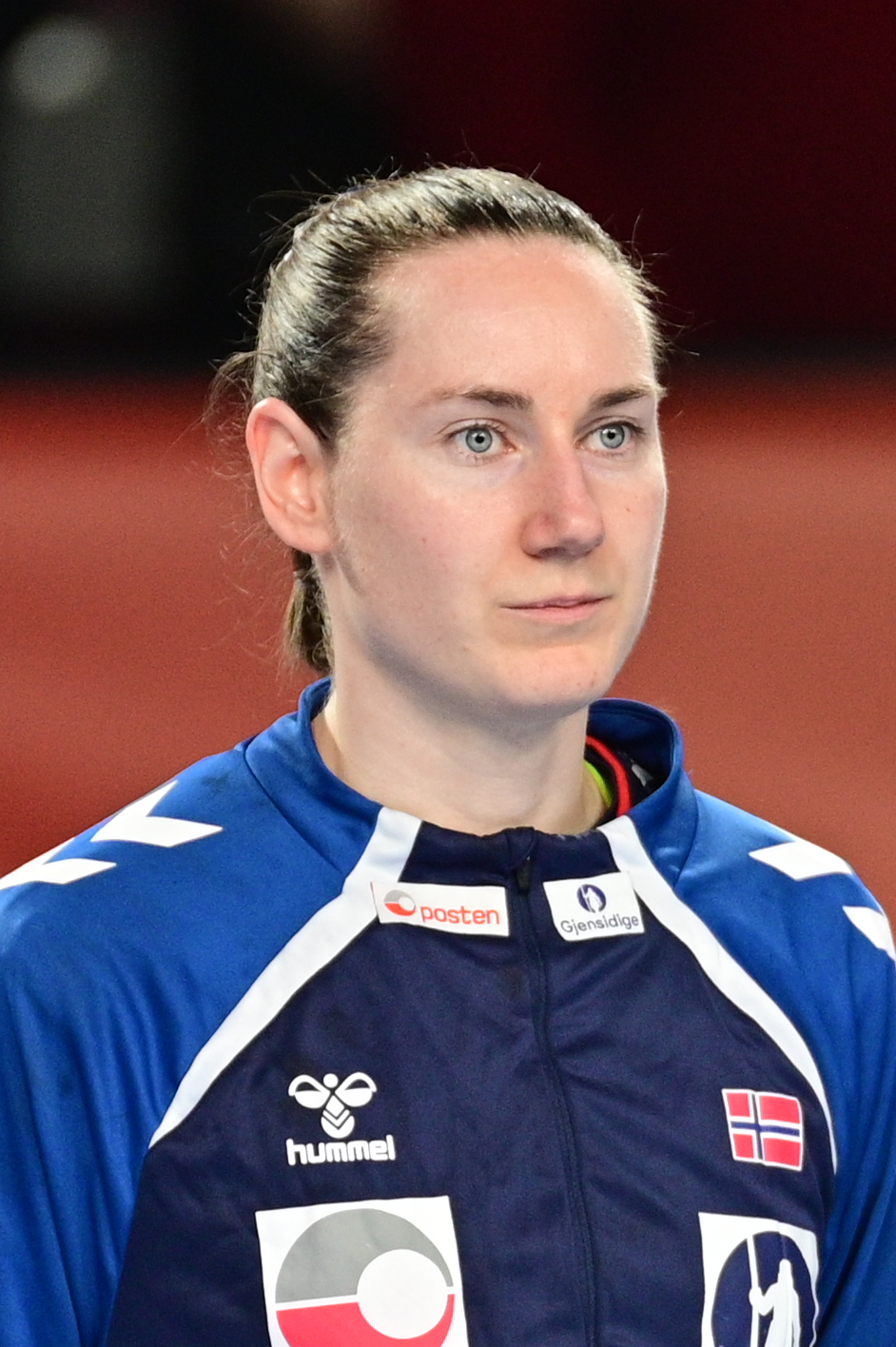
- Bakkerud in 2024

Personal information
- Full name: Ingvild Kristiansen Bakkerud
- Nationality: Norwegian
- Born: 9 July 1995 (age 31) Kongsberg, Norway
- Height: 1.87 m (6 ft 2 in)

Sport
- Sport: Handball
- Position: Left back
- Current club: Odense Håndbold
- Number: 21

Youth career
- Years: Team
- –: Skrim Kongsberg

Senior clubs
- Years: Team
- 2010–2018: Skrim Kongsberg
- 2018–2020: Odense Håndbold
- 2020–2025: Ikast Håndbold
- 2025–: Odense Håndbold
National team
Years	Team	Apps	(Gls)
2018–	Norway	89	(151)
Medal record
World Championship
Gold medal – first place	2025 Germany/Netherlands
Silver medal – second place	2023 Denmark/Norway/Sweden
European Championship
Gold medal – first place	2024 Austria/Hungary/Switzerland
Youth World Championship
Bronze medal – third place	2012 Montenegro

Ingvild Bakkerud (born 9 July 1995) is a Norwegian handball player for Odense Håndbold and the Norwegian national team

== Career ==
Bakkerud started playing handball at the hometown club Skrim Kongsberg. Here she also played beach handball, where she won the EHF Beach Handball Champions Cup in 2014.

In 2018 she joined Danish side Odense Håndbold.

In 2020 she joined league rivals Herning-Ikast Håndbold, where she won the 2023 EHF European League.

In the summer of 2025 she returned to Odense Håndbold. In a match against Ikast Håndbold on January 28th she suffered a thump injury, which kept her out for 3 months.

=== National team ===
Bakkerud played 29 youth national team matches, scoring 40 goals.

She also represented Norway at the 2012 Women's Junior World Handball Championship placing 3rd, and the 2014 Women's Junior World Handball Championship, placing 9th.

She debuted for the national team on May 30, 2018.

At the 2025 World Championship she was part of the Norwegian team that won World Cup gold medals.

== Achievements ==
- World Championship:
  - Winner: 2025
  - Silver Medalist: 2023
- European Championship:
  - Winner: 2024
- World Youth Championship:
  - Bronze Medalist: 2012
- Danish League:
  - Silver Medalist: 2020, 2026
  - Bronze Medalist: 2019
- Danish Cup:
  - Finalist: 2018, 2019
- EHF European League:
  - Winner: 2023
