= Tonje Refsnes =

Norwegian handballer (born 1994)

Tonje Haugjord Refsnes
Personal information
- Nationality: Norwegian
- Born: 13 November 1994 (age 31) Kristiansand, Norway
- Height: 1.70 m (5 ft 7 in)

Sport
- Sport: Handball
- Position: Centre back

Youth career
- Years: Team
- –: Otra IL

Senior clubs
- Years: Team
- 2010–2014: Randesund IL
- 2014–2023: Vipers Kristiansand

Tonje Refsnes (born 13 November 1994) is a retired Norwegian handball player, who last played for Vipers Kristiansand at top level.

== Achievements ==
- EHF Champions League:
  - Winner: 2020/2021, 2021/2022, 2022/2023
  - Bronze medalist: 2018/2019
- EHF Cup:
  - Finalist: 2017/2018
- Norwegian League:
  - Winner: 2017/2018, 2018/2019, 2019/2020, 2020/2021, 2021/2022, 2022/2023
  - Silver medalist: 2016/2017
- Norwegian Cup:
  - Winner: 2017, 2018, 2019, 2020, 2021, 2022/23
