= Kjerstin Boge Solås =

Norwegian handball player (born 1997)

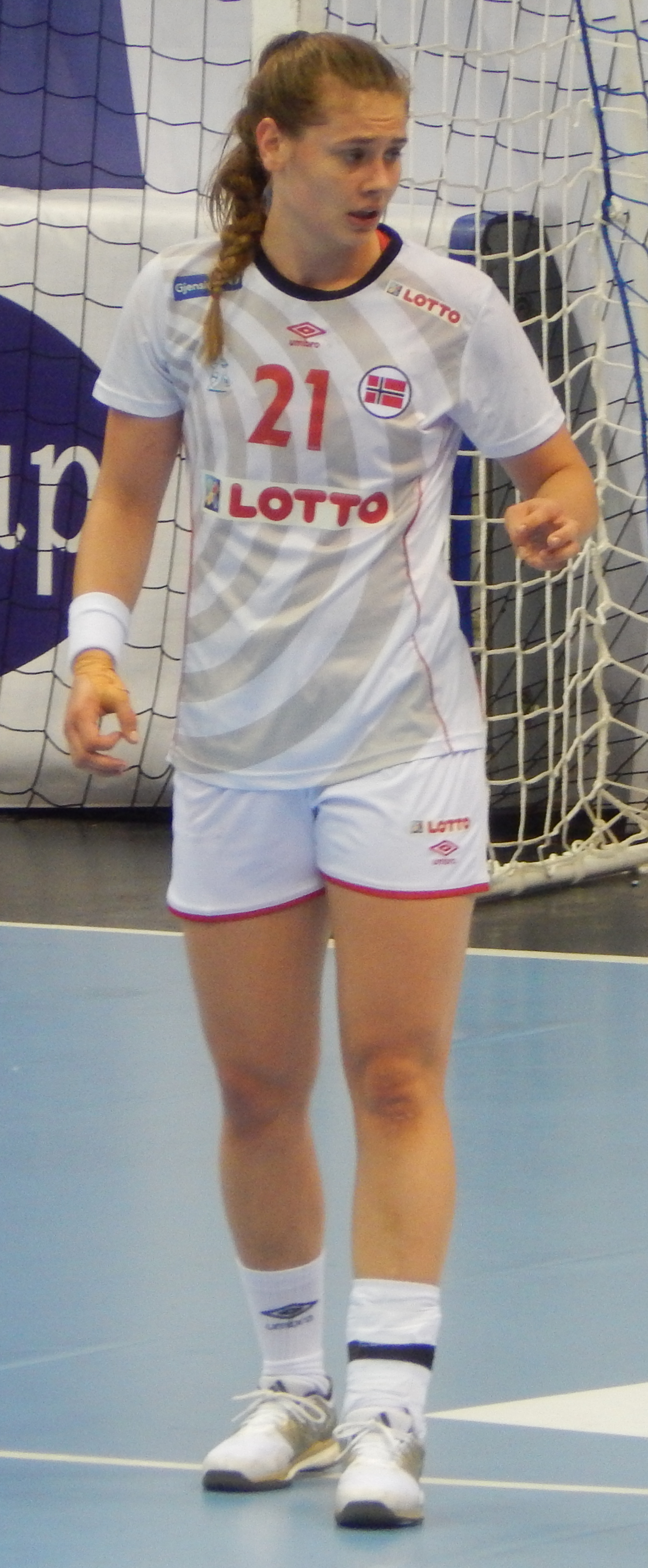

Personal information
- Nationality: Norwegian
- Born: 31 December 1997 (age 28) Dale, Norway
- Height: 1.82 m (6 ft 0 in)

Sport
- Sport: Handball
- Position: Left back
- Current club: Storhamar HE
- Number: 31

Senior clubs
- Years: Team
- 2013–2015: Dale IL
- 2015–2019: Tertnes HE
- 2019–2020: Siófok KC
- 2020–12/2023: Byåsen HE
- 03/2024–06/2024: Vipers Kristiansand
- 2024–: Storhamar HE
National team
Years	Team	Apps	(Gls)
2016–	Norway	17	(8)
Medal record
European Championship
Gold medal – first place	2016 Sweden

Kjerstin Boge Solås (born 31 December 1997) is a Norwegian handball player for Storhamar HE and the Norway women's national handball team.

She also represented Norway in the 2016 Women's Junior World Handball Championship, placing 5th, at the 2015 Women's U-19 European Handball Championship, placing 6th and at the 2014 Women's Youth World Handball Championship, placing 13th.

At the 2016 European Women's Handball Championship she won gold medals.

== Achievements ==
- European Championship
  - Winner: 2016
- Norwegian League:
  - Winner: 2023/2024, 2024/2025
  - Silver: 2025/2026
- Norwegian Cup:
  - Winner: 2024, 2025
  - Finalist: 2016
