= Thale Rushfeldt Deila =

Norwegian handball player (born 2000)

Personal information
- Nationality: Norwegian
- Born: 15 January 2000 (age 26) Porsgrunn, Norway
- Height: 1.78 m (5 ft 10 in)

Sport
- Sport: Handball
- Position: Left back
- Current club: Győri ETO KC
- Number: 33

Youth career
- Years: Team
- 2015–2016: Reistad IL

Senior clubs
- Years: Team
- 2016–2018: Glassverket IF
- 2018–2021: Fredrikstad BK
- 2021–2023: Molde Elite
- 2023–2026: Odense Håndbold
- 2026–: Győri ETO KC
National team
Years	Team	Apps	(Gls)
2022–	Norway	83	(199)
Medal record
Olympic Games
Gold medal – first place	2024 Paris	Team
World Championship
Gold medal – first place	2025 Germany/Netherlands
Silver medal – second place	2023 Denmark/Norway/Sweden
European Championship
Gold medal – first place	2022 Slovenia/North Macedonia/Montenegro
Gold medal – first place	2024 Austria/Hungary/Switzerland
Youth European Championship
Silver medal – second place	2017 Slovakia

Thale Rushfeldt Deila (born 15 January 2000) is a Norwegian handball player for Győri ETO KC and the Norwegian national team.

== Career ==
Thale Deila started playing handball at Reistad IL together with her twin sister, Live Deila.

In 2016 she transferred to first league team Glassverket IF. She made her senior debut on October 8th 2017 at the age of 17. She played at Glassverket for two seasons, the last one with her sister.

In 2018 she joined Fredrikstad BK. In 2019 her sister also joined the club, and they were thus reunited once again.

In 2021 she joined league rivals Molde HK. In 2023 she moved to Denmark to join Odense Håndbold. In the 2024-25 season, she achieved a perfect regular season with Odense Håndbold, winning 26 of 26 games. Later the same season she won the Danish Championship, when Odense beat Team Esbjerg in the final 2-1 in matches.

=== National team ===
Thale Deila played 34 junior national team matches, scoring 110 goals. She also represented Norway at the 2017 European Women's U-17 Handball Championship, where she received silver and at the 2018 Women's Youth World Handball Championship, placing 11th.

She debuted for the senior team in April 2022. The same year she won gold medal at the European Championship.

The year after she won silver medal at the 2023 World Championship on home soil.

At the 2024 Summer Olympics she won a gold medal. Later the same year she won gold medal at the European championship. At the 2025 World Championship she won her first World Championship gold medal.

== Achievements ==
=== National team ===
- Olympic Games:
  - Winner: 2024
- World Championship:
  - Winner: 2025
  - Silver Medalist: 2023
- European Championship:
  - Winner: 2022, 2024
- Youth European Championship:
  - Silver Medalist: 2017

=== Club ===
- EHF Champions League:
  - Silver: 2025
- Danish League:
  - Gold: 2025
  - Silver: 2026
- Norwegian Cup:
  - Finalist: 2021

== Individual awards ==
- All-Star Left Back of Eliteserien: 2019/2020

== Personal life ==
She is the twin sister of fellow handballer Live Rushfeldt Deila, daughter of former international footballer Ronny Deila and niece of former international footballer Sigurd Rushfeldt.
