= Turid Smedsgård =

Norwegian handball player

Personal information
- Nationality: Norwegian
- Born: 10 October 1961 (age 65)

Sport
- Sport: Handball
- Position: Goalkeeper

Senior clubs
- Years: Team
- –: Glassverket IF
- 1987-1994: Nordstrand IF
- 2001: Bækkelagets SK
National team
Years	Team	Apps	(Gls)
1978–1989	Norway	113	(0)

Turid Smedsgård is a Norwegian former handball goalkeeper. She played 113 matches for the Norway women's national handball team from 1978 onwards. She participated at the 1982 World Women's Handball Championship, where the Norwegian team placed seventh. Smedsgård was voted best goalkeeper of the tournament.

She represented Glassverket IF and Nordstrand IF. In 1981 she won the Norwegian championship with Glassverket IF beating Skogn IL 16:12 in the final. She retired from club handball in 1994, but made a brief comeback for Bækkelagets SK in 2001.

Smedsgård was awarded the Håndballstatuetten trophy from the Norwegian Handball Federation in 2000.
