= Mathilde Kristensen =

Danish handball player (born 1993)

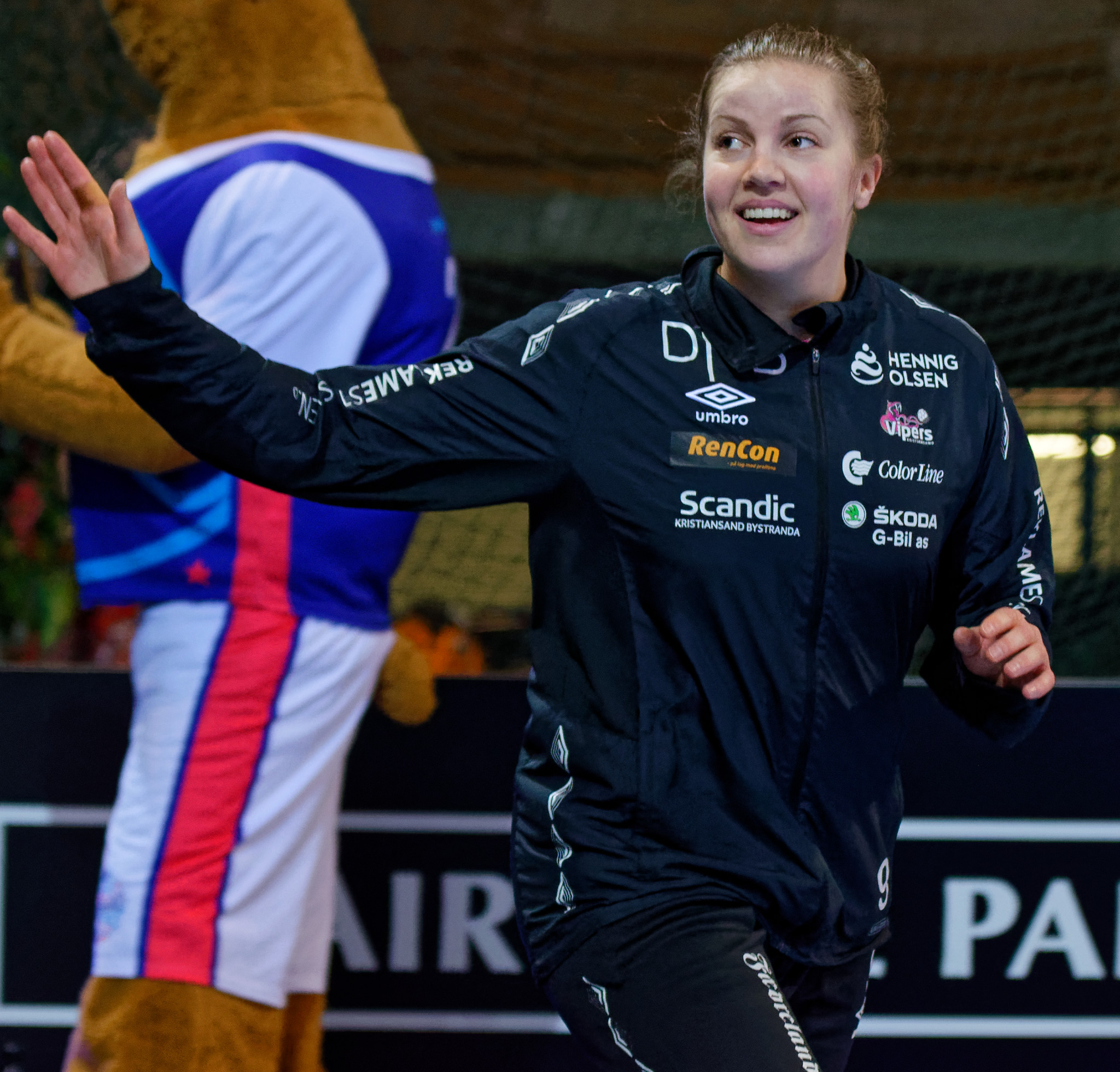
- Kristensen on 3 February 2018

Personal information
- Full name: Mathilde Kristensen
- Nationality: Danish
- Born: 7 April 1993 (age 33) Viborg, Denmark
- Height: 1.77 m (5 ft 10 in)

Sport
- Sport: Handball
- Position: Line player
- Current club: Silkeborg-Voel KFUM
- Number: 9

Senior clubs
- Years: Team
- 2010–2012: Viborg HK
- 2011–2012: Skive fH (loan)
- 2012–2015: Skive fH
- 2015–2019: Vipers Kristiansand
- 2019–2025: Silkeborg-Voel KFUM

Mathilde Kristensen (born 7 April 1993) is a Danish handball player who plays for Silkeborg-Voel KFUM.

== Career ==
Kristensen started her career at Viborg HK, where she in the 2011–12 season was loaned out to Danish 1st Division side Skive fH. After achieving promotion with the club to the Damehåndboldligaen she signed a permanent contract with the club. In 2015 she joined Norwegian Vipers Kristiansand. Here she won the Norwegian championship twice; in 2018 and 2019. In 2018 she reached the final of the EHF Cup, and in 2019 she came third in the EHF Champions League with Vipers.

For the 2019-2020 season she returned to Denmark to join Silkeborg-Voel KFUM. She has announced her intention to retire at the end of the 2024-25 season.

== Achievements ==
- EHF Champions League:
  - Bronze medalist: 2018/2019
- EHF Cup:
  - Finalist: 2018
- Norwegian League:
  - Winner: 2017/2018 (Vipers), 2018/2019 (Vipers)
- Norwegian Cup:
  - Winner: 2017, 2018
