= Glassverket IF =

Norwegian soccer and handball club

- Founded: 11 February 1919; 107 years ago
- Arena: Glassverket Gress (soccer), Glassverkethallen (handball) Drammenshallen (handball)
- Capacity: 4,200
- League: 5. Div (soccer), 1. divisjon (handball)
- 2023–24: 7th

Glassverket IF is a soccer and handball club from Drammen, Norway. The club is most famous for their handball team, which currently compete in the second tier of Norwegian handball, the 1. divisjon.

The club also facilitates skiing and used to play bandy.

== History ==
The club was founded on February 11, 1911. The handball department was founded in 1961. In 1974 they won the national championship and national cup in field handball for the first time.

In the 1980s, the club was in the top division of Norwegian handball, and they won the indoor national championship in 1981. In the 90s they featured mainly in the second and third tier.

In 2012 they were promoted to the top division once again. In 2015 the handball club finished 2nd behind Larvik HK.

In the 2016-17 season the club was in economic trouble and had to release the entire player and coaching personnel. They finished last that season and was relegated to the 1st division. The club could not stay in the first division due to the financial issues and were administratively relegated to the 3rd division.

For the 2022-23 they overtook the 1st division license from Reistad IL, and once again they played in the 1st division.

== Kits ==
AWAY

2016–17

== Handball ==
=== Honours ===
- Norwegian League:
  - Bronze: 2015/2016, 2016/2017
  - Silver: 2014/2015
- Norwegian Cup:
  - Silver: 2015

=== European record ===
| Season | Competition | Round | Club | 1st leg | 2nd leg | Aggregate |
|---|---|---|---|---|---|---|
| 2016–17 | EHF Champions League | Q1 | (Turkey) Yenimahalle Bld. SK | 34–23 | | 1st place |
| 2016–17 | EHF Champions League | Q1 | (Croatia) RK Podravka Koprivnica | 28–19 | | 1st place |
| 2016–17 | EHF Champions League | Group A | (Montenegro) Budućnost | 23–30 | 21–22 | 4th place |
| 2016–17 | EHF Champions League | Group A | (France) Metz Handball | 22–24 | 19–25 | 4th place |
| 2016–17 | EHF Champions League | Group A | (Germany) Thüringer HC | 27–33 | 16–24 | 4th place |
| 2016–17 | EHF Cup | Group D | (Denmark) Nykøbing Falster HK | 25–25 | 32–32 | 4th place |
| 2016–17 | EHF Cup | Group D | (Germany) TuS Metzingen | 16–22 | 17–39 | 4th place |
| 2016–17 | EHF Cup | Group D | (Russia) HC Lada Togliatti | 26–25 | 21–32 | 4th place |
| 2017–18 | EHF Cup | QR2 | (France) Issy-Paris Hand | 17–26 | 22-23 | |

=== Team ===
==== Current squad ====
Squad for the 2018-19 season

Goalkeeper

- 1 (Norway) Renate Resvoll Holm
- 12 (Norway) Silje Johannessen
- 16 (Norway) Mia Stensland

Wingers
RW

- 5 (Norway) Martine Håkonsen

LW

- 3 (Norway) Nina Bull-Engelstad
- 6 (Norway) Charlotte Aasbø

Line players

- 7 (Norway) Marte Figenschau
- 8 (Norway) Julia Vangen

Back players

- 5 (Norway) Martine Skjærvik Håkonsen
- 9 (Norway) Rikke Klausen
- 11 (Norway) Linn Andresen
- 14 (Norway) Emilie Sjøgren
- 15 (Norway) Renate Saastad Sømme
- 17 (Norway) Siren Landsverk Hals
- 22 (Norway) Freja Christensen

==== 2018-2019 Transfers ====
Joining

Leaving

- (Norway) Thale Rushfeldt Deila (to (Norway) Fredrikstad BK)
- (Norway) Live Rushfeldt Deila (to (Norway) Skrim Kongsberg)
- (Italy) Irene Fanton (to (Hungary) Mosonmagyaróvári KC SE)
- (Norway) Trine Bronsta (to (Norway) Skrim Kongsberg)
- (Norway) Amalie Henriette Finrud Jøsendal (to (Norway) Fana)

==== Technical staff ====
- Head coach: Christoffer Torget Moseng
- Assistant coach: Espen Fossli Olaussen

==== Notable former players ====
- (Norway) Turid Smedsgård
- (Montenegro) Alma Hasanić Grizović
- (Norway) Tiril Merg
- (Norway) Kari Brattset Dale
- (Norway) Martine Wolff
- (Norway) Line Bjørnsen
- (Norway) Line Ellertsen
- (Norway) June Andenæs
- (Sweden) Martina Thörn
- (Iceland) Birna Berg Haraldsdóttir
- (Norway) Veronica Kristiansen
- (Norway) Jeanett Kristiansen
- (Norway) Renate Saastad Sømme
- (Norway) Trine Bronsta
- (Norway) Emilie Christensen
- (Norway) Thale Rushfeldt Deila
- (Norway) Live Rushfeldt Deila
- (Norway) Marte Figenschau

== Football ==
The football department was restarted in 2007 after laying dormant for many years. In 2011 they were promoted to the 5. divisjon, the sixth tier in the Norwegian football league system.
