= Pernille Wibe =

Norwegian handball player (born 1988)

Pernille Bjørseth Wibe
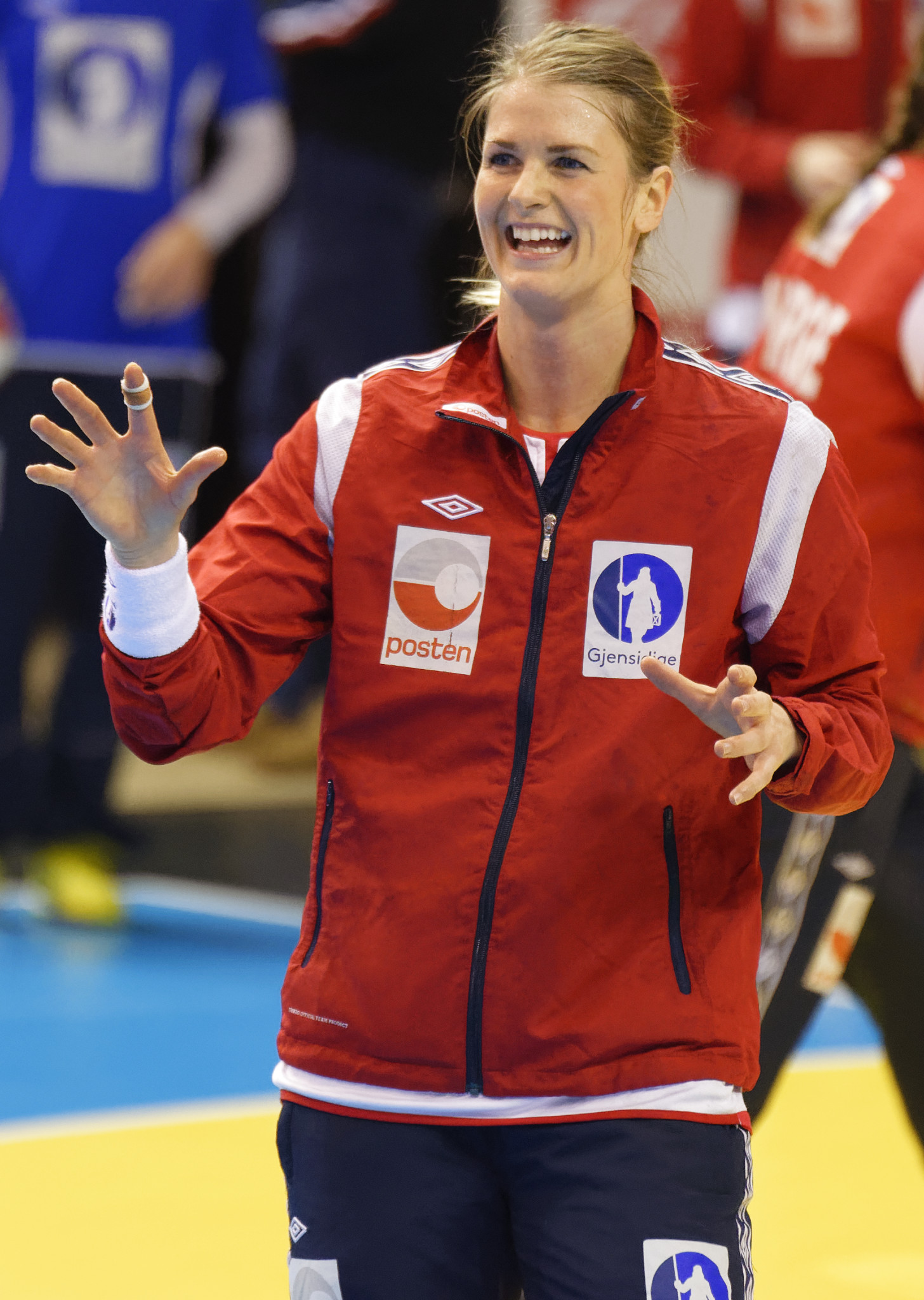

Personal information
- Nationality: Norwegian
- Born: 17 April 1988 (age 38) Oslo, Norway
- Height: 1.81 m (5 ft 11 in)

Sport
- Sport: Handball
- Position: Pivot

Senior clubs
- Years: Team
- 2004–2008: Bækkelaget SK
- 2008–2011: Byåsen HE
- 2011–2013: Larvik HK
- 2013–2017: Issy-Paris Hand
- 2018–2019: Vipers Kristiansand
National team
Years	Team	Apps	(Gls)
2011–2016	Norway	53	(34)
Medal record
World Championship
Gold medal – first place	2015 Denmark
European Championship
Gold medal – first place	2014 Croatia/Hungary

Pernille Wibe (born 17 April 1988) is a retired Norwegian handball player, who last played for Vipers Kristiansand. She was also a player for the Norwegian national team, winning one world champion title and one European championship title.

== International career ==
Wibe made her debut on the Norwegian national team in 2011. She won a gold medal at the 2014 European Women's Handball Championship in Hungary/Croatia, and a gold medal at the 2015 World Women's Handball Championship in Denmark.

== Achievements ==
- World Championship:
  - Winner: 2015
- European Championship:
  - Winner: 2014
- EHF Champions League:
  - Finalist: 2012/2013
  - Bronze Medalist: 2018/2019
  - Semifinalist: 2011/2012
- EHF Challenge Cup
  - Finalist: 2013/2014
- Norwegian Championship:
  - Winner: 2011/2012 (Larvik), 2012/2013 (Larvik), 2018/2019 (Vipers)
- Norwegian Cup:
  - Winner: 2011 (Larvik), 2012 (Larvik), 2018 (Vipers)
  - Finalist: 2008 (Byåsen), 2009 (Byåsen)
