= Elise Skinnehaugen =

Norwegian handball player (born 1996)

Personal information
- Full name: Elise Skinnehaugen
- Nationality: Norwegian
- Born: 3 June 1996 (age 30) Hamar, Norway
- Height: 1.69 m (5 ft 7 in)

Sport
- Sport: Handball
- Position: Right back/wing

Senior clubs
- Years: Team
- 2012–2021: Storhamar HE
- 2021–2023: Molde Elite
- 2023–2024: Toulon Métropole Var Handball
- 2025–: Storhamar HE

Elise Skinnehaugen (born 3 June 1996) is a Norwegian handball player.

National team coach, Thorir Hergeirsson has been impressed with Skinnehaugen's performance so far this fall season, as she has scored many important goals for Storhamar HE, indicating we might see her in a national team squad in 2018.

== Achievements ==
- Norwegian League
  - Silver medalist: 2018/2019, 2019/2020, 2020/2021, 2025/2026
  - Bronze medalist: 2017/2018
- Norwegian Cup:
  - Winner: 2025
  - Finalist: 2018, 2019, 2021

== Individual awards ==
- Eliteserien's "public favorite": 2018/2019
