= Malin Aune =

Norwegian handball player (born 1995)

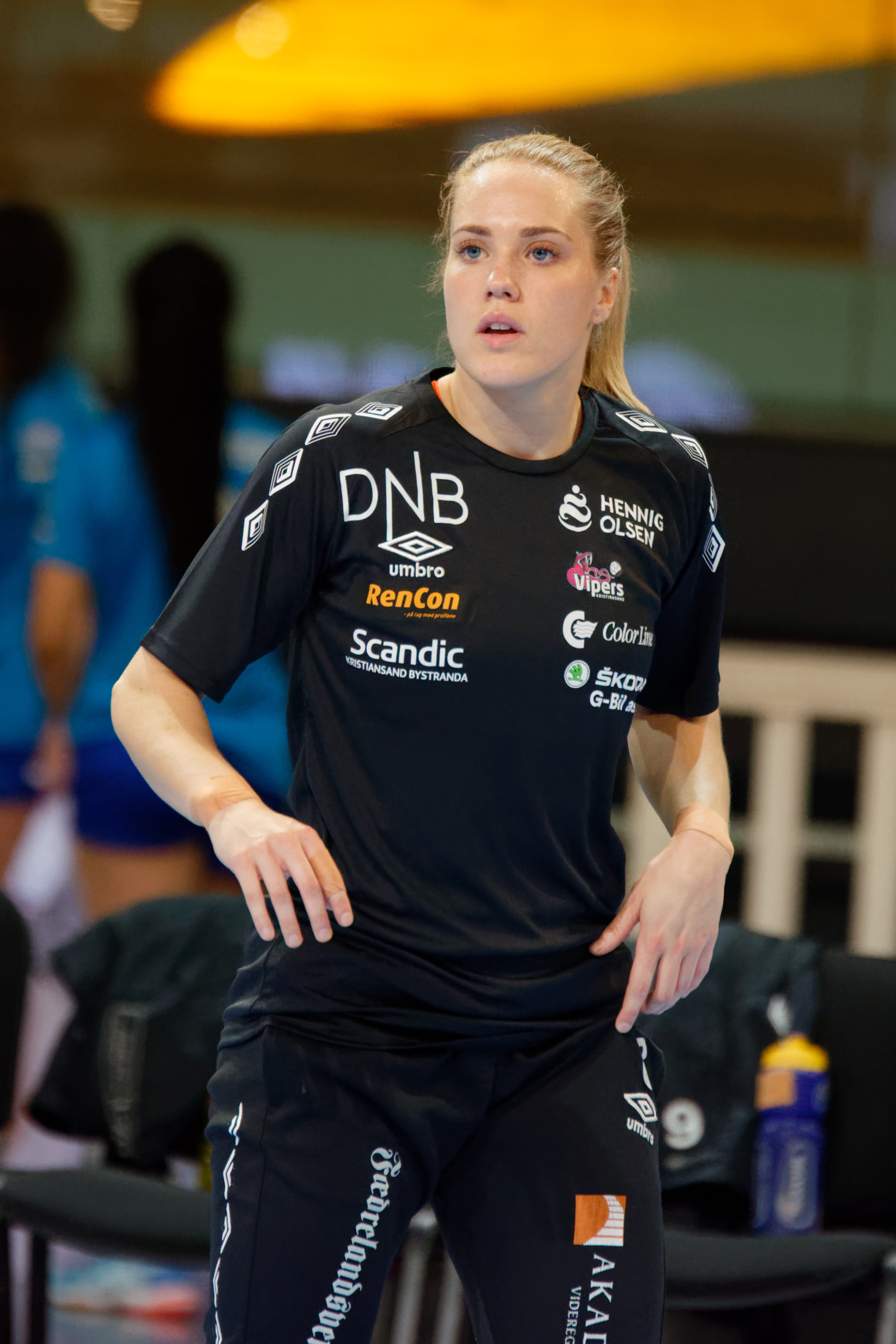
- Aune in 2018

Personal information
- Full name: Malin Larsen Aune
- Nationality: Norwegian
- Born: 4 March 1995 (age 31) Ranheim, Norway
- Height: 1.65 m (5 ft 5 in)

Sport
- Sport: Handball
- Position: Right wing
- Current club: Storhamar HE
- Number: 6

Youth career
- Years: Team
- –: Ranheim IL

Senior clubs
- Years: Team
- 2011–2014: Selbu IL
- 2014–2017: Oppsal
- 2017–2021: Vipers Kristiansand
- 2021–2023: CSM București
- 2023–2025: Odense Håndbold
- 2025–: Storhamar HE
National team
Years	Team	Apps	(Gls)
2015–	Norway	117	(218)
Medal record
World Championship
Gold medal – first place	2021 Spain
Gold medal – first place	2025 Germany/Netherlands
European Championship
Gold medal – first place	2016 Sweden
Gold medal – first place	2020 Denmark
Gold medal – first place	2022 Slovenia/North Macedonia/Montenegro
Youth World Championship
Bronze medal – third place	2012 Montenegro
Youth European Championship
Bronze medal – third place	2011 Czech Republic

Malin Larsen Aune (born 4 March 1995) is a Norwegian handball player for Storhamar HE and formerly for the Norwegian national team.

== Career ==
Aune started playing handball aged 8 in her hometown club Ranheim IL. In 2012 she joined Selbu IL in the first division. Two years later she joined Oppsal IF in the top division.

In 2017 she joined Vipers Kristiansand. Here she won the Norwegian Championship four years in a row from 2018 to 2021 as well as the 2021 Champions League.

In 2021 she joined Romanian CSM București. Here she won the Romanian Championship and Cup double in both 2022 and 2023.

In 2023 she joined Danish side Odense Håndbold.

In the 2024-25 season, she achieved a perfect regular season with Odense Håndbold, winning 26 of 26 games. Later the same season she won the Danish Championship, when Odense beat Team Esbjerg in the final 2-1 in matches.

The following summer she returned to Norway and joined Storhamar HE.

== National team ==
She represented Norway in the 2013 Women's Junior European Handball Championship, placing 4th, and in the 2014 Women's Junior World Handball Championship, placing 9th.

She made her debut on the Norwegian national team in 2015. At her first major international tournament, the 2016 European Women's Handball Championship, she won gold medals. She also played at the 2018 European Championship. At the 2020 European Championship she won her second European title with Norway. During the tournament she scored 12 goals.

In 2021 she won gold medals at the 2021 World Women's Handball Championship. A year later she won her third European title at the 2022 European Women's Handball Championship. Aune scored 14 goals during the tournament.

At the 2025 World Championship she won her second World Cup gold medals.

== Achievements ==
- World Championship:
  - Winner: 2021, 2025
- European Championship
  - Winner: 2016, 2020, 2022
- World Youth Championship:
  - Bronze Medalist: 2012
- Youth European Championship:
  - Bronze Medalist: 2011
- EHF Champions League:
  - Winner: 2020/2021
  - Silver Medalist: 2024/2025
  - Bronze Medalist: 2018/2019
- EHF Cup:
  - Finalist: 2018
- Romanian Cup:
  - Winner: 2022
- Romanian Supercup:
  - Winner: 2022
  - Finalist: 2021
- Norwegian League:
  - Winner: 2017/2018, 2018/2019, 2019/2020, 2020/2021
  - Silver: 2025/2026
- Norwegian Cup:
  - Winner: 2017, 2018, 2019, 2020, 2025
- Danish League:
  - Gold: 2025

== Individual awards ==
- All-Star Right Wing of Eliteserien: 2018/2019
- All-Star Right Wing of Møbelringen Cup: 2018
