= Karoline Olsen =

Norwegian handball player (born 1998)

Personal information
- Nationality: Norwegian
- Born: 16 June 1998 (age 28) Kristiansand, Norway
- Height: 1.71 m (5 ft 7 in)

Sport
- Sport: Handball
- Position: Left wing

Senior clubs
- Years: Team
- 2015–2022: Vipers Kristiansand
Medal record
Junior World Championship
Silver medal – second place	2018 Hungary

Karoline Olsen (born 16 June 1998) is a former Norwegian handball player, who last played for Vipers Kristiansand.

Olsen was a former centre back, but retrained as a left wing.

She also represented Norway at the 2017 Women's Junior European Handball Championship, placing 7th, at the 2016 Women's Youth World Handball Championship, placing 4th and at the 2015 European Women's U-17 Handball Championship, placing 11th.

In 2022 she was forced to retire due to her many injures in both her shoulder and her knees.

== Achievements ==
- Junior World Championship:
  - Silver Medalist: 2018
- EHF Champions League:
  - Winner: 2020/2021, 2021/2022
  - Bronze medalist: 2018/2019
- EHF Cup:
  - Finalist: 2017/2018
- Norwegian League:
  - Winner: 2017/2018, 2018/2019, 2019/2020, 2020/2021
  - Silver medalist: 2016/2017
- Norwegian Cup:
  - Winner: 2017, 2018, 2019, 2020
