= IL Skrim =

Norwegian handball club

- Full name: Idrettslaget Skrim
- Founded: 22 January 1898
- Ground: Skrimhallen or Kongsberghallen, Kongsberg (handball); Skrim kunstgress, Kongsberg (football)

Idrettslaget Skrim is a Norwegian multi-sports club from southern Kongsberg. It has sections for team handball, association football, American football, Nordic skiing, badminton, discgolf, muay thai/Brazilian jiu-jitsu and archery.

The club was founded on 1 June 1945 in Saggrenda as a merger of Saggrenda IL (founded 1898) and Labro SK (founded 1929). The club has adopted 22 January 1898 as its founding date. After the merger, the club primarily did skiing with football and athletics, but did not own a football ground. The team jerseys are blue.

The women's handball team was promoted to the Eliteserien, the top division in 2018, but were relegated again the following season, after finishing 11th out of 12. Notable former players include Live Rushfeldt Deila, Ingvild Bakkerud and Nina Heglund.

The men's football team plays in the Seventh Division, the eighth tier of football in Norway.
