= Cecilie Løvdal =

Norwegian handball player (born 1998)

Personal information
- Full name: Cecilie Løvdal
- Nationality: Norwegian
- Born: 29 August 1998 (age 28) Arendal, Norway
- Height: 1.80 m (5 ft 11 in)

Sport
- Sport: Handball
- Position: Left back
- Current club: SønderjyskE Håndbold
- Number: 3

Senior clubs
- Years: Team
- 2015-2018: IK Grane
- 2018-2020: Gjerpen IF
- 2020-: SønderjyskE Håndbold

Cecilie Løvdal (born 29 August 1998) is a Norwegian handball player who plays for SønderjyskE Håndbold.

She has previously played for IK Grane of Arendal, and for Gjerpen IF in Norwegian Eliteserien.

In April 2020, she signed a one-year contract with the Danish League club Ajax København, however, shortly after in August 2020 she had re-signed to SønderjyskE Håndbold.
