= Vilde Jonassen =

Norwegian handball player (born 1992)

Vilde Kaurin Jonassen
Personal information
- Nationality: Norwegian
- Born: 1 September 1992 (age 34) Kristiansand, Norway
- Height: 1.65 m (5 ft 5 in)

Sport
- Sport: Handball
- Position: Left wing
- Current club: Vipers Kristiansand
- Number: 10

Senior clubs
- Years: Team
- 2011–01/2025: Vipers Kristiansand
National team
Years	Team	Apps	(Gls)
2021	Norway	1	(1)

Vilde Kaurin Jonassen (born 1 September 1992) is a Norwegian handball player, who played for Vipers Kristiansand her entire career.

== Achievements ==
- EHF Champions League:
  - Winner: 2020/2021, 2021/2022, 2022/2023
  - Bronze medalist: 2018/2019
- EHF Cup:
  - Finalist: 2017/2018
- Norwegian League:
  - Winner: 2017/2018, 2018/2019, 2019/2020, 2020/2021, 2021/2022, 2022/2023, 2023/2024
  - Silver medalist: 2016/2017
- Norwegian Cup:
  - Winner: 2017, 2018, 2019, 2020, 2021, 2022/23, 2023/24
