= Ragnhild Valle Dahl =

Norwegian handballer (born 1998)

Personal information
- Nationality: Norwegian
- Born: 2 January 1998 (age 28) Elnesvågen, Norway
- Height: 1.78 m (5 ft 10 in)

Sport
- Sport: Handball
- Position: Left back
- Current club: Odense Håndbold
- Number: 22

Senior clubs
- Years: Team
- 2015–2019: Molde Elite
- 2019–2023: Vipers Kristiansand
- 2023–2026: Odense Håndbold
- 2026–: Viborg HK
National team
Years	Team	Apps	(Gls)
2022–	Norway	10	(19)
Medal record
European Championship
Gold medal – first place	2022 Slovenia/North Macedonia/Montenegro
Junior World Championship
Silver medal – second place	2018 Hungary

Ragnhild Valle Dahl (born 2 January 1998) is a Norwegian handball player for Odense Håndbold and the Norwegian national team.

== International career ==
Valle Dahl represented Norway in the 2017 Women's Junior European Handball Championship, placing 7th, and in the 2016 Women's Youth World Handball Championship, placing 4th.

Valle Dahl was also a part of Norway's 28-squad for the 2019 World Women's Handball Championship and Norways 35-squad for the 2020 European Women's Handball Championship

At the 2022 European Championship, she and Norway won gold.

== Club career ==
In February 2019 it was revealed that Valle Dahl had signed a contract with Norwegian champions Vipers Kristiansand, for the upcoming 2019/20-season.

In the 2024-25 season, she achieved a perfect regular season with Odense Håndbold, winning 26 of 26 games. Later the same season she won the Danish Championship, when Odense beat Team Esbjerg in the final 2-1 in matches.

== Achievements ==
- European Championship
  - Gold Medalist: 2022
- Junior World Championship:
  - Silver Medalist: 2018
- EHF Champions League:
  - Winner: 2020/2021, 2021/2022, 2022/2023
  - Silver: 2024/2025
- Norwegian League:
  - Winner: 2019/2020, 2020/2021, 2021/2022, 2022/2023
- Norwegian Cup:
  - Winner: 2019, 2020, 2021, 2022/23
- Danish League:
  - Winner: 2025
  - Silver: 2026

== Individual awards ==
- All-Star Left Back of Eliteserien: 2018/2019
- Topscorer of Eliteserien 2018/2019: (148 goals)
