= Live Rushfeldt Deila =

Norwegian handball player (born 2000)

Personal information
- Full name: Live Rushfeldt Deila
- Nationality: Norwegian
- Born: 15 January 2000 (age 26) Porsgrunn, Norway
- Height: 1.76 m (5 ft 9 in)

Sport
- Sport: Handball
- Position: Centre back
- Current club: Team Esbjerg
- Number: 8

Youth career
- Years: Team
- 2016–2017: Reistad IL

Senior clubs
- Years: Team
- 2017–2018: Glassverket IF
- 2018–2019: Skrim Kongsberg
- 2019–2021: Fredrikstad BK
- 2021–12/2023: Sola HK
- 12/2023–: Team Esbjerg
National team
| Years | Team | Apps | (Gls) |
| 2023– | Norway | 44 | (54) |
Medal record
World Championship
| Gold medal – first place | 2025 Germany/Netherlands |
European Championship
| Gold medal – first place | 2024 Austria/Hungary/Switzerland |
Junior European Championship
| Silver medal – second place | 2019 Hungary |
Youth European Championship
| Silver medal – second place | 2017 Slovakia |

Live Rushfeldt Deila (born 15 January 2000) is a Norwegian handball player who plays for Team Esbjerg and the Norwegian national team.

== Career ==
Deila started playing handball at Reistad IL together with her twin sister, Thale.

In 2017 she transferred to first league team Glassverket IF. After a year she joined Skrim Kongsberg, where she also played for a single season before joining Fredrikstad BK, where she was reunited with her twin sister.

In 2021 she joined Sola HK in search of a club, where she could be the first choice. Here she won silver medals in the Norwegian cup once.

Halfway through the season in 2023 she joined Danish side Team Esbjerg. With Esbjerg she won the Danish championship in 2024.

She also represented Norway at the 2017 European Women's U-17 Handball Championship, placing 2nd, at the 2018 Women's Youth World Handball Championship, placing 11th and at the 2019 Women's U-19 European Handball Championship, placing 2nd.

In April 2023 she debuted for the Norwegian national team. In 2024 she won the European championship.

A year later at the 2025 World Championship she was part of the Norwegian team that won World Cup gold medals. Deila acted mainly as a back-up during the tournament.

In December 2025 she extended her contract with Team Esbjerg until 2028.

== Achievements ==
- World Championship:
  - Winner: 2025
- European Championship:
  - Winner: 2024
- Junior European Championship:
  - Silver Medalist: 2019
- Youth European Championship:
  - Silver Medalist: 2017
- EHF Champions League:
  - Bronze medalist: 2023/2024, 2024/2025
- Norwegian League
  - Bronze: 2021/2022, 2022/2023
- Norwegian Cup
  - Silver: 2022/2023
- Danish League:
  - Winner: 2024, 2026
- Danish Cup:
  - Winner: 2024

== Personal life ==
She is the twin sister of Thale Rushfeldt Deila and daughter of former international footballer Ronny Deila. Her uncle Sigurd Rushfeldt was also a professional football player.
