= Vipers Kristiansand =

Norwegian handball club

- Full name: Vipers Kristiansand
- Short name: Vipers
- Founded: 12 January 1938 (as IK Våg)
- Dissolved: 13 January 2025
- Arena: Aquarama Kristiansand
- Capacity: 2,200
Home	Away

Vipers Kristiansand was a professional handball club from Kristiansand, Norway. The team competed in REMA 1000-ligaen, the top division in the country, from its promotion in 2001 until its bankruptcy in 2025.

They claimed their first Norwegian championship in 2018, ending an 18 times streak for the champions from Larvik HK. Since then, they've shown strong dominance in Norway and claimed 7 consecutive league titles, 7 cup titles and 5 playoff titles.

For the first time in the club's history, they qualified for the 2018–19 Women's EHF Final 4 in Budapest, where they took the 3rd place and a historic bronze medal. On 30 May 2021, they won the 2020–21 Women's EHF Champions League and the following year they succeeded again, becoming the first Norwegian team to win EHF Champions League two years in a row. In 2023, they claimed another Women's EHF Final 4 title and secured the treble while the EHF FINAL4 Women in Budapest broke the world record for spectator attendance at women's handball matches.

On 20 October 2024, the club announced they were going to seek bankruptcy. On 21 October 2024, it was reported that the club would not seek bankruptcy after all. A group of investors were interested in saving the club, in exchange that a new board of directors were elected and that the current one collectively stepped off.

However, on 13 January 2025, the club officially declared bankruptcy with all players being let go of their contracts.

== Achievements ==
REMA 1000-ligaen:

- Gold: 2017/2018, 2018/2019, 2019/2020, 2020/2021, 2021/2022, 2022/2023, 2023/2024
- Silver: 2016/2017
- Bronze: 2002/2003

Norwegian Cup:

- Winner: 2017, 2018, 2019, 2020, 2021, 2022/23, 2023/2024
- Silver: 2010

EHF Champions League:

- Winner: 2020/2021, 2021/2022, 2022/2023
- Bronze: 2018/2019

EHF Cup:

- Finalist: 2017/2018

== Players ==
=== Notable former national team players ===
- (Norway) Veronica Kristiansen
- (Norway) Elise Alsand
- (Norway) Kristine Lunde-Borgersen
- (Norway) Kari Brattset Dale
- (Norway) Pernille Wibe
- (Norway) Linn Jørum Sulland
- (Norway) Emilie Hegh Arntzen
- (Norway) Malin Aune
- (Norway) Henny Reistad
- (Norway) Nora Mørk
- (Norway) Heidi Løke
- (Norway) Andrea Austmo Pedersen
- (Norway) Ragnhild Valle Dahl
- (Norway) Kjerstin Boge Solås
- (Norway) Karine Dahlum
- (Norway) Silje Solberg-Østhassel
- (Norway) Katrine Lunde
- (Norway) Sunniva Næs Andersen
- (Norway) Silje Waade
- (Norway) Marta Tomac
- (Angola) Carolina Morais
- (Croatia) Katarina Ježić
- (Croatia) Ana Debelić
- (Czech Republic) Markéta Jeřábková
- (Czech Republic) Jana Knedlíková
- (Denmark) Louise Pedersen
- (Denmark) Annette Jensen
- (Spain) Nerea Pena
- (Spain) Lysa Tchaptchet
- (Spain) Paula Arcos
- (France) Océane Sercien-Ugolin
- (Iceland) Þórey Rósa Stefánsdóttir
- (Germany) Angie Geschke
- (Germany) Luisa Schulze
- (Hungary) Zsuzsanna Tomori
- (Japan) Sakura Hauge
- (Netherlands) Jessy Kramer
- (Netherlands) Lynn Knippenborg
- (Netherlands) Charris Rozemalen
- (Netherlands) Annick Lipman
- (Netherlands) Merel Freriks
- (Netherlands) Lois Abbingh
- (Netherlands) Larissa Nüsser
- (Russia) Anna Vyakhireva
- (Switzerland) Mia Emmenegger
- (Sweden) Isabelle Gulldén
- (Sweden) Evelina Eriksson
- (Sweden) Sofie Börjesson
- (Sweden) Jamina Roberts
- (Sweden) Nina Koppang
- (Sweden) Carin Strömberg

=== Notable former club players ===
- (Norway) Beate Bang Grimestad
- (Norway) Bodil Flo Berge
- (Norway) Janne Brox
- (Norway) Susanne Fuglestad
- (Norway) Hilde Kvifte
- (Norway) Ingunn Birkeland
- (Norway) Lindy Taraldsen
- (Norway) Christin Høgaas Daland
- (Norway) Katrine Høyland
- (Norway) Helene Jørgensen Vinknes
- (Norway) Gerd Elin Albert
- (Norway) Susann Iren Hall
- (Norway) Pernille Wang Skaug
- (Norway) Kristin Nørstebø
- (Norway) Jeanett Kristiansen
- (Norway) June Andenæs
- (Norway) Hanna Yttereng
- (Norway) Tonje Refsnes
- (Norway) Dina Frisendal
- (Norway) Tuva Høve
- (Norway) Vilde Jonassen
- (Norway) Mina Hesselberg
- (Sweden) Therese Helgesson
- (Sweden) Emma Jonsson
- (Sweden) Sara Nirvander
- (Sweden) Ulrika Olsson
- (Denmark) Michelle Brandstrup
- (Denmark) Sanne Bak Pedersen
- (Denmark) Mathilde Kristensen
- (Denmark) Julie Stokkendal Poulsen
- (Netherlands) Birgit Van Os
- (Hungary) Renáta Kári-Horváth
- (Switzerland) Karin Weigelt

=== Kit manufacturers ===
Period	Kit manufacturer
–2016	(Norway) Playmaker
2016–2023	(England) Umbro
2023–2025	(Germany) Puma

== Statistics ==
=== Top scorers in the EHF Champions League ===
Last updated on 11 January 2025

Rank	Name	Seasons played	Goals
1	(Czech Republic) Jana Knedlíková	5	263
2	(Norway) Sunniva Næs Andersen	8	205
3	(Russia) Anna Vyakhireva	2	197
4	(Czech Republic) Markéta Jeřábková	2	192
5	(Norway) Henny Reistad	3	189
6	(Norway) Linn Jørum Sulland	4	187
7	(Sweden) Jamina Roberts	3	184
8	(Norway) Nora Mørk	2	179
9	(Norway) Ragnhild Valle Dahl	4	173
10	(Norway) Emilie Hegh Arntzen	4	152

=== Individual awards in the EHF Champions League ===
Season	Player	Award
2018–19	(Norway) Linn Jørum Sulland	Top Scorer (89 goals)
2018–19	(Norway) Katrine Lunde	All-Star Team (Best Goalkeeper)
2020–21	(Norway) Henny Reistad	Most Valuable Player
2020–21	(Norway) Nora Mørk	All-Star Team (Best Right Back)
2020–21	(Norway) Henny Reistad	All-Star Team (Best Young Player)
2020–21	(Norway) Ole Gustav Gjekstad	Best Coach
2021–22	(Czech Republic) Markéta Jeřábková	Most Valuable Player
2021–22	(Norway) Nora Mørk	All-Star Team (Best Right Back)
2022–23	(Russia) Anna Vyakhireva	Most Valuable Player
2023–24	(Russia) Anna Vyakhireva	Top Scorer (113 goals)

== European record ==
Season	Competition	Round	Club	1st leg	2nd leg	Aggregate
2003–04	EHF Cup	Round 3	(Greece) OF Nea Ionia	37–13	36–21	73–34
2003–04	EHF Cup	Round of 16	(France) ESBF Besançon	31–26	30–32	61–58
2003–04	EHF Cup	QF	(North Macedonia) Eurostandard G.P. Skopje	41–33	33–24	74–57
2003–04	EHF Cup	SF	(Hungary) Győri Graboplast ETO	29–26	20–29	49–55
2004–05	EHF Cup	Round 3	(Switzerland) ZMC Amicitia Zürich	19–27	34–25	53–52
2004–05	EHF Cup	1/8	(Hungary) Győri Graboplast ETO	28–38	25–33	53–71
2015–16	EHF Cup Winners' Cup	Round 3	(Norway) Halden HK	25–19	22–20	47–39
2015–16	EHF Cup Winners' Cup	Last 16	(Poland) MKS Selgros Lublin	28–22	22–25	50–47
2015–16	EHF Cup Winners' Cup	Quarter-finals	(Slovenia) RK Krim	29–27	20–30	49–57
2016–17	EHF Cup	R1	(Italy) Cassano Magnago	52–10	37–12	89–22
2016–17	EHF Cup	R2	(Russia) WHC Lada Togliatti	23–29	32–26	55–55
2017–18	EHF Cup; Finalist	Group B	(France) Issy Paris	22–23	24–25	46–48
2017–18	EHF Cup; Finalist	Group B	(Denmark) København Håndbold	30–23	25–30	55–53
2017–18	EHF Cup; Finalist	Group B	(Russia) Handball Club Lada	30–21	24–29	54–50
2017–18	EHF Cup; Finalist	QF	(France) Brest Bretagne Handball	26–17	29–34	55–51
2017–18	EHF Cup; Finalist	SF	(Denmark) Viborg HK	31–34	29–23	60–57
2017–18	EHF Cup; Finalist	F	(Romania) SCM Craiova	26–22	25–30	51–52
2017–18	EHF Champions League	QT1-SF	(Belarus) HC Gomel	43–19		
2017–18	EHF Champions League	QT1-F	(Croatia) HC Podravka Vegeta	42–14		
2017–18	EHF Champions League	Group D	(France) Metz Handball	22–30	22–25	44–55
2017–18	EHF Champions League	Group D	(Montenegro) ŽRK Budućnost	29–19	23–26	52–45
2017–18	EHF Champions League	Group D	(Germany) SG BBM Bietigheim	24–29	24–25	48–54
2018–19	EHF Champions League; Third place	Group D	(Romania) CSM București	27–29	31–26	58–55
2018–19	EHF Champions League; Third place	Group D	(Hungary) Ferencvárosi TC	26–27	35–27	61–54
2018–19	EHF Champions League; Third place	Group D	(Germany) SG BBM Bietigheim	27–27	34–26	61–53
2018–19	EHF Champions League; Third place	Main Round; Group 2	(Hungary) Győri ETO KC	26–33	29–33	55–66
2018–19	EHF Champions League; Third place	Main Round; Group 2	(Slovenia) RK Krim Ljubljana	29–21	25–24	54–45
2018–19	EHF Champions League; Third place	Main Round; Group 2	(Germany) Thüringer HC	31–24	29–21	60–46
2018–19	EHF Champions League; Third place	QF	(Montenegro) ŽRK Budućnost	25–18	24–19	49–37
2018–19	EHF Champions League; Third place	SF	(Hungary) Győri ETO KC	22–31		
2018–19	EHF Champions League; Third place	Bronze Match	(France) Metz Handball	31–30		
2019–20	EHF Champions League	Group A	(France) Metz Handball	38–38	17–26	55–64
2019–20	EHF Champions League	Group A	(Croatia) RK Podravka Koprivnica	24–25	34–28	58–53
2019–20	EHF Champions League	Group A	(Hungary) Ferencvárosi TC	31–22	34–29	65–51
2019–20	EHF Champions League	Main Round; Group 1	(Russia) Rostov-Don	29–32	26–33	55–65
2019–20	EHF Champions League	Main Round; Group 1	(Denmark) Team Esbjerg	31–35	30–35	61–70
2019–20	EHF Champions League	Main Round; Group 1	(Romania) CSM București	23–25	22–28	45–53
2020–21	EHF Champions League; Winner	Group A	(Russia) Rostov-Don	23–24	0–10	5th place
2020–21	EHF Champions League; Winner	Group A	(France) Metz Handball	29–28	0–10	5th place
2020–21	EHF Champions League; Winner	Group A	(Denmark) Team Esbjerg	28–28	27–27	5th place
2020–21	EHF Champions League; Winner	Group A	(Hungary) Ferencvárosi TC	26–31	28–30	5th place
2020–21	EHF Champions League; Winner	Group A	(Romania) CSM București	30–25	29–22	5th place
2020–21	EHF Champions League; Winner	Group A	(Germany) SG BBM Bietigheim	10–0	33–29	5th place
2020–21	EHF Champions League; Winner	Group A	(Slovenia) RK Krim	37–30	27–26	5th place
2020–21	EHF Champions League; Winner	Round of 16	(Denmark) Odense Håndbold	35–36	30–26	65–62
2020–21	EHF Champions League; Winner	QF	(Russia) Rostov-Don	34–27	23–23	57–50
2020–21	EHF Champions League; Winner	SF	(Russia) CSKA Moscow	33–30		
2020–21	EHF Champions League; Winner	Final	(France) Brest Bretagne Handball	34–28		
2021–22	Champions League; Winner	Group B	(Russia) CSKA Moscow	24–27	32–28	2nd place
2021–22	Champions League; Winner	Group B	(Slovenia) RK Krim Mercator	27–26	37–20	2nd place
2021–22	Champions League; Winner	Group B	(Denmark) Odense Håndbold	31–27	32–27	2nd place
2021–22	Champions League; Winner	Group B	(Hungary) Győri Audi ETO KC	29–35	30–29	2nd place
2021–22	Champions League; Winner	Group B	(France) Metz Handball	18–23	25–31	2nd place
2021–22	Champions League; Winner	Group B	(Turkey) Kastamonu Bld. GSK	39–25	35–24	2nd place
2021–22	Champions League; Winner	Group B	(Sweden) IK Sävehof	34–25	42–23	2nd place
2021–22	Champions League; Winner	QF	(Slovenia) RK Krim Mercator	33–24	32–25	65–49
2021–22	Champions League; Winner	SF	(France) Metz Handball	33–27		
2021–22	Champions League; Winner	Final	(Hungary) Győri Audi ETO KC	33–31		
2022–23	EHF Champions League; Winner	Group A	(Denmark) Odense Håndbold	34–27	34–24	1st place
2022–23	EHF Champions League; Winner	Group A	(Slovenia) RK Krim Mercator	27–21	36–31	1st place
2022–23	EHF Champions League; Winner	Group A	(Germany) SG BBM Bietigheim	30–32	34–32	1st place
2022–23	EHF Champions League; Winner	Group A	(France) Brest Bretagne Handball	31–24	36–29	1st place
2022–23	EHF Champions League; Winner	Group A	(Hungary) FTC-Rail Cargo Hungaria	26–26	27–26	1st place
2022–23	EHF Champions League; Winner	Group A	(Czech Republic) DHK Baník Most	43–21	39–24	1st place
2022–23	EHF Champions League; Winner	Group A	(Romania) CSM București	35–29	24–27	1st place
2022–23	EHF Champions League; Winner	QF	(Romania) CS Rapid București	31–25	40–31	71–56
2022–23	EHF Champions League; Winner	SF	(Hungary) Győri Audi ETO KC	37–35		
2022–23	EHF Champions League; Winner	Final	(Hungary) FTC-Rail Cargo Hungaria	28–24		
2023–24	EHF Champions League	Group B	(Denmark) Team Esbjerg	37–38	37–32	4th place
2023–24	EHF Champions League	Group B	(France) Metz Handball	34–36	29–31	4th place
2023–24	EHF Champions League	Group B	(Romania) CS Rapid București	29–30	35–30	4th place
2023–24	EHF Champions League	Group B	(Hungary) FTC-Rail Cargo Hungaria	37–26	35–27	4th place
2023–24	EHF Champions League	Group B	(Poland) Zagłębie Lubin	34–20	28–24	4th place
2023–24	EHF Champions League	Group B	(Slovenia) RK Krim Mercator	24–24	29–23	4th place
2023–24	EHF Champions League	Group B	(Denmark) Ikast Håndbold	26–30	31–32	4th place
2023–24	EHF Champions League	Playoffs	(Hungary) DVSC Schaeffler	29–28	27–27	56–55
2023–24	EHF Champions League	QF	(Hungary) Győri ETO KC	23–30	26–24	49–54
2024–25	EHF Champions League	Group B	(Denmark) Team Esbjerg	29–30	0–10	Withdrawn
2024–25	EHF Champions League	Group B	(Montenegro) ŽRK Budućnost Podgorica	32–23	20–26	Withdrawn
2024–25	EHF Champions League	Group B	(Germany) HB Ludwigsburg	30–23	29–33	Withdrawn
2024–25	EHF Champions League	Group B	(Hungary) Győri ETO KC	22–27	0–10	Withdrawn
2024–25	EHF Champions League	Group B	(France) Brest Bretagne Handball	27–30	0–10	Withdrawn
2024–25	EHF Champions League	Group B	(Romania) CS Rapid București	30–30	0–10	Withdrawn
2024–25	EHF Champions League	Group B	(Denmark) Odense Håndbold	26–24	0–10	Withdrawn
