= Norwegian Women's Handball Cup =

- Founded: 1938 (outdoors); 1958 (indoors)
- Region: Norway
- Teams: Registration
- Current champions: Storhamar HE (2025)
- Most championships: Larvik HK (17 titles)
- Website: handball.no
- 2025

The Norwegian Women's Handball Cup (Norwegian: NM (Norgesmesterskapet)), is the main domestic cup tournament for Norwegian women's handball clubs, which is organised and supervised by the Norwegian Handball Federation. The competition has been played annually since 1946. Larvik HK is its most successful team with 17 titles. Between 1939 and 1974 there was also an outdoor competition besides indoor.

In the 2022/23 and 2023/24-edition, the semifinals and finals was being played in a Final 8 format, where both men's and women's final 4 teams played during the same weekend in the same arena.

== Finals ==
=== Outdoors ===
*	Match went to extra time

No.	Year	Winners	Score	Runners-up
1.	1938	Nordstrand (1)	1–0	Bækkelaget
2.	1939	Nordstrand (2)	3–2	Grefsen
3.	1940	Bækkelagets SPKL. (1)	5–4	Grefsen
–	1941	not held		
–	1942	not held		
–	1943	not held		
–	1944	not held		
–	1945	not held		
4.	1946	Grefsen (1)	6–5	H-40
5.	1947	Grefsen (2)	4–2	H-40
6.	1948	Grefsen (3)	5–0	Sørskogbygda
7.	1949	Oslo Håndballklubb (1)	1–0	H-40
8.	1950	Oslo Håndballklubb (2)	3–0	H-40
9.	1951	Grefsen (4)	6–0	Skarphedin
10.	1952	Trøgstad (1)	2–1	H-40
11.	1953	Oslo Håndballklubb (3)	4–2	Trøgstad
12.	1954	Oslo Håndballklubb (4)	5–2	Skjeberg
13.	1955	Oslo Håndballklubb (5)	4–0	Grefsen
14.	1956	Oslo Håndballklubb (6)	3–2	Grefsen
15.	1957	Grefsen (5)	3–2	Skjeberg
16.	1958	Skogn (1)	6–4	Grefsen
17.	1959	Skogn (2)	4–1	Skjeberg
18.	1960	Skogn (3)	6–4	Skjeberg
19.	1961	Skogn (4)	9–7	Skjeberg
20.	1962	Skogn (5)	6–3	Sandviken
21.	1963	Skogn (6)	3–2	Brandval
22.	1964	Skjeberg (1)	7–3	Brandval
23.	1965	Sørskogbygda (1)	6–1	Skogn
24.	1966	Skjeberg (2)	13–3	Sørskogbygda
25.	1967	Sørskogbygda (2)	13–10	Vestar
26.	1968	Skjeberg (3)	11–10 (a.e.t.)	Sørskogbygda
27.	1969	Brandval (1)	9–8	Sørskogbygda
28.	1970	Freidig (1)	7–5	Vestar
29.	1971	Stabæk (1)	5–4	Freidig
30.	1972	Brandval (2)	6–5	Glassverket
31.	1973	Skjeberg (4)	4–3	Freidig
32.	1974	Glassverket (1)	9–8	Freidig

=== Indoors ===
Note that the year the title counts for has been changing during the years, sometimes being by what year the cup started and sometimes by season.

*	Match went to extra time	**	Match went to penalty shootout

No.	Year	Winners	Score	Runners-up
1.	1958	Skarphedin (1)	3–2	Oslo Håndballklubb
2.	1959	Oslo Håndballklubb (1)	2–0	H-40
3.	1960	Oslo Håndballklubb (2)	5–1	Grefsen
4.	1961	Grefsen (1)	9–6	Frigg
5.	1962	Frigg (1)	7–2	Grefsen
6.	1963	Skogn (1)	7–3	Brandval
7.	1964	Frigg (2)	5–4	Sørskogbygda
8.	1965	Skogn (2)	9–8	Skjeberg
9.	1966	Sørskogbygda (1)	8–7 (a.e.t.)	Brandval
10.	1967	Skjeberg	12–12 (a.e.t.)	Brandval
10.	rematch 1967	Brandval (1)	13–7	Skjeberg
–	1968	only held outdoors		
–	1969	only held outdoors		
–	1970	only held outdoors		
–	1971	only held outdoors		
–	1972	only held outdoors		
–	1973	only held outdoors		
–	1974	only held outdoors		
–	1975	not held		
11.	1976	Vestar (1)	15–9	Sverresborg
12.	1977	Vestar (2)	17–13	Skogn
13.	1978	Skogn (3)	17–12	Skjeberg
14.	1979	Skogn (4)	11–9	Nordstrand
15.	1980	Skogn (5)	15–12	Byåsen
16.	1981	Glassverket (1)	16–12	Skogn
17.	1982	Sverresborg (1)	22–21	Skogn
18.	1983	Sverresborg (2)	16–15	Freidig
19.	1984	Sverresborg (3)	22–16	Freidig
20.	1985	Gjerpen (1)	20–17	Byåsen
21.	1986	Gjerpen (2)	22–20	Byåsen
22.	1987	Nordstrand (1)	28–16	Byåsen
23.	1988	Byåsen (1)	21–18	Sverresborg
24.	1989	Byåsen (2)	20–15	Lunner
25.	1990	Gjerpen (3)	26–20	Lunner
26.	1991	Byåsen (3)	20–19 (a.e.t.)	Bækkelaget
27.	1992	Gjerpen (4)	24–19	Toten
28.	1993	Gjerpen (5)	24–19	Larvik
29.	1994	Bækkelaget (1)	26–24 (a.e.t.)	Byåsen
–	1995	not held		
30.	1996	Larvik (1)	25–19	Gjerpen
30.	1996/97	Bækkelaget (2)	25–19	Larvik
31.	1997/98	Larvik (2)	14–13	Byåsen
32.	1998/99	Bækkelaget (3)	25–21	Larvik
33.	1999/00	Larvik (3)	29–24	Nordstrand
34.	2000/01	Bækkelaget (4)	26–20	Nordstrand
35.	2001/02	Nordstrand (2)	21–18	Tertnes
36.	2002/03	Larvik (4)	21–18	Nordstrand
37.	2003/04	Larvik (5)	30–23	Nordstrand
38.	2004/05	Larvik (6)	28–23	Byåsen
39.	2005	Larvik (7)	21–18	Byåsen
40.	2006	Larvik (8)	29–20	Byåsen
41.	2007	Byåsen (4)	30–27	Larvik
42.	2008	Larvik (9)	30–29	Byåsen
43.	2009	Larvik (10)	33–22	Byåsen
44.	2010	Larvik (11)	31–18	Vipers Kristiansand
45.	2011	Larvik (12)	37–13	Stabæk
46.	2012	Larvik (13)	31–26	Stabæk
47.	2013	Larvik (14)	29–21	Tertnes
48.	2014	Larvik (15)	35–15	Halden
49.	2015	Larvik (16)	28–19	Glassverket
50.	2016	Larvik (17)	24–19	Tertnes
51.	2017	Vipers Kristiansand (1)	30–17	Stabæk
52.	2018	Vipers Kristiansand (2)	31–25	Storhamar
53.	2019	Vipers Kristiansand (3)	29–26	Storhamar
54.	2020	Vipers Kristiansand (4)	29–16	Sola
55.	2021	Vipers Kristiansand (5)	38–20	Molde
56.	2022/23	Vipers Kristiansand (6)	30–23	Sola
57.	2023/24	Vipers Kristiansand (7)	32–23	Storhamar
58.	2024	Storhamar (1)	22–22 (5–4, a.p.so.)	Tertnes
59.	2025	Storhamar (2)	29–29 (8–7, a.p.so.)	Larvik
