= 2026–27 Women's EHF Champions League group stage =

The 2026–27 Women's EHF Champions League group stage is played between 5 September 2026 and 21 February 2027 to determine the teams advancing to the knockout stage of the 2026–27 Women's EHF Champions League.

== Format ==
In each group, teams will play against each other in a double round-robin format, with home and away matches. The teams ranked first and second in each group will advance directly to the quarter-finals, while the teams ranked third to sixth will advance to the play-offs.

== Draw ==
The draw was held on 26 June 2026 in Vienna, Austria. The 16 teams were drawn into two groups of eight teams.

=== Seeding ===
The seeding pots were announced on 25 June 2026.

Pot 1	Pot 2	Pot 3	Pot 4
(Denmark) Team Esbjerg (France) Metz Handball (Hungary) Győri Audi ETO KC (Romania) CSM București	(Denmark) Odense Håndbold (France) Brest Bretagne Handball (Hungary) FTC-Toyota Kovács (Romania) CS Gloria Bistrița	(Croatia) HC Podravka (Germany) BV Borussia Dortmund (Norway) Storhamar Håndball Elite (Slovenia) RK Krim OTP Group Mercator	(Denmark) Nykøbing Falster Håndbold (Germany) HSG Blomberg-Lippe (Montenegro) OTP Group Budućnost (Norway) Sola Håndballklubb

== Tiebreakers ==
In the group stage, teams are ranked according to points (2 points for a win, 1 point for a draw, 0 points for a loss). After completion of the group stage, if two or more teams have the same number of points, the ranking will be determined as follows:

1. Highest number of points in matches between the teams directly involved;
2. Superior goal difference in matches between the teams directly involved;
3. Highest number of goals scored in matches between the teams directly involved;
4. Superior goal difference in all matches of the group;
5. Highest number of plus goals in all matches of the group;

If the ranking of one of these teams is determined, the above criteria are consecutively followed until the ranking of all teams is determined. If no ranking can be determined, a decision shall be obtained by EHF through drawing of lots.

== Schedule ==
The group stage is scheduled to be played between 5 September 2026 and 20 February 2027.

Round	Dates
Round 1	5–6 September 2026
Round 2	12–13 September 2026
Round 3	19–20 September 2026
Round 4	3–4 October 2026
Round 5	10–11 October 2026
Round 6	17–18 October 2026
Round 7	7–8 November 2026

Round	Dates
Round 8	14–15 November 2026
Round 9	9–10 January 2027
Round 10	16–17 January 2027
Round 11	23–24 January 2027
Round 12	6–7 February 2027
Round 13	13–14 February 2027
Round 14	20–21 February 2027

== Groups ==
Times up to 17 October 2026 UTC+2, times after are UTC+1.

=== Group A ===
Pos	Team	Pld	W	D	L	GF	GA	GD	Pts	Qualification
1	(Denmark) Team Esbjerg	8	7	0	1	252	215	+37	14	Quarterfinals
2	(Hungary) FTC-Toyota Kovács	8	6	0	2	247	211	+36	12	Quarterfinals
3	(France) Brest Bretagne Handball	8	5	0	3	242	223	+19	10	Playoffs
4	(Romania) CSM București	8	4	0	4	243	245	−2	8	Playoffs
5	(Germany) Borussia Dortmund	8	4	0	4	227	246	−19	8	Playoffs
6	(Norway) Sola HK	8	3	0	5	220	211	+9	6	Playoffs
7	(Montenegro) OTP Group Budućnost	8	2	0	6	185	215	−30	4	
8	(Slovenia) RK Krim OTP Group Mercator	8	1	0	7	218	268	−50	2	

Updated to match(es) played on 15 November 2026. Source: EHF
Rules for classification: Tiebreakers

5 September 2026; 16:00	RK Krim OTP Group Mercator (Slovenia)	29–37	(Romania) CSM București	Arena Stožice, Ljubljana; Attendance: 615; Referees: Antić, Jakovljević (SRB)
5 September 2026; 16:00	Zulić 9	(19–17)	Maslova 7	Arena Stožice, Ljubljana; Attendance: 615; Referees: Antić, Jakovljević (SRB)
5 September 2026; 16:00	3× (suspension)	Report	1× (yellow card) 6× (suspension)	Arena Stožice, Ljubljana; Attendance: 615; Referees: Antić, Jakovljević (SRB)

5 September 2026; 16:00	Borussia Dortmund (Germany)	24–33	(Denmark) Team Esbjerg	Helmut‐Körnig‐Halle, Dortmund; Attendance: 523; Referees: Covalciuc, Covalciuc (MDA)
5 September 2026; 16:00	three players 4	(9–17)	Reistad 10	Helmut‐Körnig‐Halle, Dortmund; Attendance: 523; Referees: Covalciuc, Covalciuc (MDA)
5 September 2026; 16:00	1× (suspension)	Report	1× (suspension)	Helmut‐Körnig‐Halle, Dortmund; Attendance: 523; Referees: Covalciuc, Covalciuc (MDA)

6 September 2026; 16:00	Sola HK (Norway)	25–29	(France) Brest Bretagne Handball	Åsenhallen, Sola; Attendance: 922; Referees: Lesiak, Lidacka (POL)
6 September 2026; 16:00	Holta 6	(14–19)	Ondono 8	Åsenhallen, Sola; Attendance: 922; Referees: Lesiak, Lidacka (POL)
6 September 2026; 16:00	1× (yellow card) 3× (suspension)	Report	2× (yellow card) 4× (suspension)	Åsenhallen, Sola; Attendance: 922; Referees: Lesiak, Lidacka (POL)

6 September 2026; 16:00	OTP Group Budućnost (Montenegro)	20–29	(Hungary) FTC-Toyota Kovács	Morača Sports Center, Podgorica; Attendance: 670; Referees: Stancu (ROU), Pepe (ITA)
6 September 2026; 16:00	Skrobić 6	(9–15)	Omoregie 7	Morača Sports Center, Podgorica; Attendance: 670; Referees: Stancu (ROU), Pepe (ITA)
6 September 2026; 16:00	1× (yellow card) 3× (suspension) 1× (red card)	Report	4× (suspension)	Morača Sports Center, Podgorica; Attendance: 670; Referees: Stancu (ROU), Pepe (ITA)

12 September 2026; 16:00	CSM București (Romania)	36–26	(Montenegro) OTP Group Budućnost	Polyvalent Hall, Bucharest; Attendance: 2,500; Referees: Nygaard, Primdahl (DEN)
12 September 2026; 16:00	Dmitrieva, Maslova 10	(17–13)	Jauković 7	Polyvalent Hall, Bucharest; Attendance: 2,500; Referees: Nygaard, Primdahl (DEN)
12 September 2026; 16:00	1× (suspension)	Report	1× (yellow card) 4× (suspension)	Polyvalent Hall, Bucharest; Attendance: 2,500; Referees: Nygaard, Primdahl (DEN)

12 September 2026; 16:00	FTC-Toyota Kovács (Hungary)	40–29	(Slovenia) RK Krim OTP Group Mercator	Érd Aréna, Érd; Attendance: 1,200; Referees: Dašić, Husomanović (NOR)
12 September 2026; 16:00	Omoregie 7	(21–12)	Mário 6	Érd Aréna, Érd; Attendance: 1,200; Referees: Dašić, Husomanović (NOR)
12 September 2026; 16:00	3× (suspension)	Report	1× (yellow card) 2× (suspension)	Érd Aréna, Érd; Attendance: 1,200; Referees: Dašić, Husomanović (NOR)

12 September 2026; 18:00	Brest Bretagne Handball (France)	34–24	(Germany) Borussia Dortmund	Brest Arena, Brest; Attendance: 3,195; Referees: Altmár, Horváth (HUN)
12 September 2026; 18:00	Horacek 8	(17–12)	Grijseels, Vollebregt 4	Brest Arena, Brest; Attendance: 3,195; Referees: Altmár, Horváth (HUN)
12 September 2026; 18:00	2× (suspension)	Report	1× (suspension)	Brest Arena, Brest; Attendance: 3,195; Referees: Altmár, Horváth (HUN)

13 September 2026; 16:00	Team Esbjerg (Denmark)	28–25	(Norway) Sola HK	Blue Water Dokken, Esbjerg; Attendance: 1,780; Referees: Jakovljević, Kovačević (SRB)
13 September 2026; 16:00	Mørk, Reistad 7	(16–12)	Herrem 8	Blue Water Dokken, Esbjerg; Attendance: 1,780; Referees: Jakovljević, Kovačević (SRB)
13 September 2026; 16:00	1× (suspension)	Report	6× (suspension)	Blue Water Dokken, Esbjerg; Attendance: 1,780; Referees: Jakovljević, Kovačević (SRB)

19 September 2026; 16:00	Borussia Dortmund (Germany)	35–32	(Romania) CSM București	Helmut‐Körnig‐Halle, Dortmund; Attendance: 454; Referees: Martins, Martins (POR)
19 September 2026; 16:00	Thomaier 7	(13–20)	three players 6	Helmut‐Körnig‐Halle, Dortmund; Attendance: 454; Referees: Martins, Martins (POR)
19 September 2026; 16:00	4× (suspension)	Report	1× (yellow card) 4× (suspension)	Helmut‐Körnig‐Halle, Dortmund; Attendance: 454; Referees: Martins, Martins (POR)

19 September 2026; 16:00	Sola HK (Norway)	25–28	(Hungary) FTC-Toyota Kovács	Åsenhallen, Sola; Attendance: 484; Referees: Chiruță, Murariu (ROU)
19 September 2026; 16:00	Holta 6	(11–13)	five players 4	Åsenhallen, Sola; Attendance: 484; Referees: Chiruță, Murariu (ROU)
19 September 2026; 16:00	2× (suspension)	Report	1× (yellow card) 4× (suspension)	Åsenhallen, Sola; Attendance: 484; Referees: Chiruță, Murariu (ROU)

19 September 2026; 18:00	RK Krim OTP Group Mercator (Slovenia)	31–37	(Denmark) Team Esbjerg	Tivoli Hall, Ljubljana; Attendance: 1,130; Referees: Balvan, Praštalo (BIH)
19 September 2026; 18:00	three players 5	(16–20)	Reistad 13	Tivoli Hall, Ljubljana; Attendance: 1,130; Referees: Balvan, Praštalo (BIH)
19 September 2026; 18:00	1× (yellow card) 3× (suspension)	Report	4× (suspension)	Tivoli Hall, Ljubljana; Attendance: 1,130; Referees: Balvan, Praštalo (BIH)

20 September 2026; 16:00	OTP Group Budućnost (Montenegro)	22–27	(France) Brest Bretagne Handball	Morača Sports Center, Podgorica; Attendance: 600; Referees: Beňuš, Uhlíř (CZE)
20 September 2026; 16:00	Jauković 9	(10–13)	Horacek 6	Morača Sports Center, Podgorica; Attendance: 600; Referees: Beňuš, Uhlíř (CZE)
20 September 2026; 16:00	1× (yellow card) 3× (suspension)	Report	4× (suspension)	Morača Sports Center, Podgorica; Attendance: 600; Referees: Beňuš, Uhlíř (CZE)

3 October 2026; 16:00	FTC-Toyota Kovács (Hungary)	24–23	(Romania) CSM București	Érd Aréna, Érd; Attendance: 1,800; Referees: Barysas, Petrusis (LTU)
3 October 2026; 16:00	Omoregie 6	(13–11)	Friis 7	Érd Aréna, Érd; Attendance: 1,800; Referees: Barysas, Petrusis (LTU)
3 October 2026; 16:00	6× (suspension)	Report	3× (suspension)	Érd Aréna, Érd; Attendance: 1,800; Referees: Barysas, Petrusis (LTU)

4 October 2026; 14:00	Team Esbjerg (Denmark)	27–21	(Montenegro) OTP Group Budućnost	Blue Water Dokken, Esbjerg; Attendance: 1,820; Referees: Dáné, Marton (HUN)
4 October 2026; 14:00	Mørk, Reistad 8	(13–13)	Skrobić 6	Blue Water Dokken, Esbjerg; Attendance: 1,820; Referees: Dáné, Marton (HUN)
4 October 2026; 14:00		Report	2× (suspension) 1× (red card)	Blue Water Dokken, Esbjerg; Attendance: 1,820; Referees: Dáné, Marton (HUN)

4 October 2026; 14:00	Sola HK (Norway)	27–32	(Germany) Borussia Dortmund	Åsenhallen, Sola; Attendance: 685; Referees: Antić, Jakovljević (SRB)
4 October 2026; 14:00	Andersen 8	(15–20)	Grijseels 10	Åsenhallen, Sola; Attendance: 685; Referees: Antić, Jakovljević (SRB)
4 October 2026; 14:00	1× (suspension)	Report	1× (yellow card) 3× (suspension)	Åsenhallen, Sola; Attendance: 685; Referees: Antić, Jakovljević (SRB)

4 October 2026; 16:00	Brest Bretagne Handball (France)	28–25	(Slovenia) RK Krim OTP Group Mercator	Brest Arena, Brest; Attendance: 3,311; Referees: Weijmans, Wolbertus (NED)
4 October 2026; 16:00	Nocandy 6	(13–12)	Abina 6	Brest Arena, Brest; Attendance: 3,311; Referees: Weijmans, Wolbertus (NED)
4 October 2026; 16:00		Report	1× (yellow card) 2× (suspension)	Brest Arena, Brest; Attendance: 3,311; Referees: Weijmans, Wolbertus (NED)

10 October 2026; 18:00	Brest Bretagne Handball (France)	28–33	(Hungary) FTC-Toyota Kovács	Brest Arena, Brest; Attendance: 3,533; Referees: Bozhinovski, Nachevski (MKD)
10 October 2026; 18:00	Horacek 7	(15–17)	Simon 10	Brest Arena, Brest; Attendance: 3,533; Referees: Bozhinovski, Nachevski (MKD)
10 October 2026; 18:00		Report	1× (yellow card) 2× (suspension)	Brest Arena, Brest; Attendance: 3,533; Referees: Bozhinovski, Nachevski (MKD)

11 October 2026; 14:00	OTP Group Budućnost (Montenegro)	23–22	(Norway) Sola HK	Morača Sports Center, Podgorica; Attendance: 300; Referees: Picard, Vauchez (FRA)
11 October 2026; 14:00	Godeč 7	(14–11)	Andersen 7	Morača Sports Center, Podgorica; Attendance: 300; Referees: Picard, Vauchez (FRA)
11 October 2026; 14:00	1× (yellow card) 3× (suspension)	Report	4× (suspension)	Morača Sports Center, Podgorica; Attendance: 300; Referees: Picard, Vauchez (FRA)

11 October 2026; 16:00	CSM București (Romania)	34–31	(Denmark) Team Esbjerg	Polyvalent Hall, Bucharest; Attendance: 4,000; Referees: Bolic, Hurich (AUT)
11 October 2026; 16:00	three players 5	(18–17)	Deila 7	Polyvalent Hall, Bucharest; Attendance: 4,000; Referees: Bolic, Hurich (AUT)
11 October 2026; 16:00	1× (suspension)	Report	3× (suspension)	Polyvalent Hall, Bucharest; Attendance: 4,000; Referees: Bolic, Hurich (AUT)

11 October 2026; 16:00	Borussia Dortmund (Germany)	37–31	(Slovenia) RK Krim OTP Group Mercator	Helmut‐Körnig‐Halle, Dortmund; Attendance: 802; Referees: Oyarzun, Zaragueta (ESP)
11 October 2026; 16:00	Antl 9	(22–18)	Abina 9	Helmut‐Körnig‐Halle, Dortmund; Attendance: 802; Referees: Oyarzun, Zaragueta (ESP)
11 October 2026; 16:00	6× (suspension)	Report	1× (yellow card) 4× (suspension)	Helmut‐Körnig‐Halle, Dortmund; Attendance: 802; Referees: Oyarzun, Zaragueta (ESP)

17 October 2026; 16:00	Team Esbjerg (Denmark)	35–26	(France) Brest Bretagne Handball	Blue Water Dokken, Esbjerg; Attendance: 2,111; Referees: Thiyagarajah, Thiyagarajah (GER)
17 October 2026; 16:00	Reistad 10	(14–14)	Tshimanga 5	Blue Water Dokken, Esbjerg; Attendance: 2,111; Referees: Thiyagarajah, Thiyagarajah (GER)
17 October 2026; 16:00	2× (suspension)	Report	2× (suspension)	Blue Water Dokken, Esbjerg; Attendance: 2,111; Referees: Thiyagarajah, Thiyagarajah (GER)

17 October 2026; 16:00	FTC-Toyota Kovács (Hungary)	39–25	(Germany) Borussia Dortmund	Érd Aréna, Érd; Attendance: 1,600; Referees: Bočáková, Jánošíková (SVK)
17 October 2026; 16:00	Klujber, Simon 8	(16–13)	five players 3	Érd Aréna, Érd; Attendance: 1,600; Referees: Bočáková, Jánošíková (SVK)
17 October 2026; 16:00	2× (suspension)	Report	4× (suspension)	Érd Aréna, Érd; Attendance: 1,600; Referees: Bočáková, Jánošíková (SVK)

17 October 2026; 18:00	RK Krim OTP Group Mercator (Slovenia)	24–23	(Montenegro) OTP Group Budućnost	Tivoli Hall, Ljubljana; Attendance: 400; Referees: Bolic, Hurich (AUT)
17 October 2026; 18:00	Zulić 8	(10–11)	Skrobić 8	Tivoli Hall, Ljubljana; Attendance: 400; Referees: Bolic, Hurich (AUT)
17 October 2026; 18:00	1× (suspension) 1× (red card)	Report	2× (suspension)	Tivoli Hall, Ljubljana; Attendance: 400; Referees: Bolic, Hurich (AUT)

18 October 2026; 16:00	CSM București (Romania)	22–30	(Norway) Sola HK	Polyvalent Hall, Bucharest; Attendance: 3,500; Referees: Dáné, Marton (HUN)
18 October 2026; 16:00	Friis 7	(11–14)	Grønstad, Herrem 5	Polyvalent Hall, Bucharest; Attendance: 3,500; Referees: Dáné, Marton (HUN)
18 October 2026; 16:00	1× (yellow card) 3× (suspension)	Report	4× (suspension)	Polyvalent Hall, Bucharest; Attendance: 3,500; Referees: Dáné, Marton (HUN)

7 November 2026; 16:00	RK Krim OTP Group Mercator (Slovenia)	22–29	(Norway) Sola HK	Tivoli Hall, Ljubljana; Attendance: 1,430; Referees: Stancu (ROU), Pepe (ITA)
7 November 2026; 16:00	Abina, Zulić 5	(9–18)	Herrem 8	Tivoli Hall, Ljubljana; Attendance: 1,430; Referees: Stancu (ROU), Pepe (ITA)
7 November 2026; 16:00	3× (suspension)	Report	4× (suspension)	Tivoli Hall, Ljubljana; Attendance: 1,430; Referees: Stancu (ROU), Pepe (ITA)

7 November 2026; 18:00	Brest Bretagne Handball (France)	40–25	(Romania) CSM București	Brest Arena, Brest; Attendance: 4,165; Referees: Balvan, Praštalo (BIH)
7 November 2026; 18:00	Mairot 9	(20–11)	Friis, Maslova 8	Brest Arena, Brest; Attendance: 4,165; Referees: Balvan, Praštalo (BIH)
7 November 2026; 18:00	2× (suspension)	Report	4× (suspension)	Brest Arena, Brest; Attendance: 4,165; Referees: Balvan, Praštalo (BIH)

8 November 2026; 14:00	Team Esbjerg (Denmark)	29–26	(Hungary) FTC-Toyota Kovács	Blue Water Dokken, Esbjerg; Attendance: 2,892; Referees: Weijmans, Wolbertus (NED)
8 November 2026; 14:00	Mørk, Reistad 7	(15–11)	Tchaptchet 6	Blue Water Dokken, Esbjerg; Attendance: 2,892; Referees: Weijmans, Wolbertus (NED)
8 November 2026; 14:00	1× (yellow card) 2× (suspension)	Report	1× (yellow card) 1× (suspension)	Blue Water Dokken, Esbjerg; Attendance: 2,892; Referees: Weijmans, Wolbertus (NED)

8 November 2026; 16:00	Borussia Dortmund (Germany)	24–25	(Montenegro) OTP Group Budućnost	WESTPRESS arena, Dortmund; Attendance: 1,421; Referees: Chiruță, Murariu (ROU)
8 November 2026; 16:00	Grijseels 5	(13–9)	Jauković 9	WESTPRESS arena, Dortmund; Attendance: 1,421; Referees: Chiruță, Murariu (ROU)
8 November 2026; 16:00	4× (suspension)	Report	2× (suspension) 1× (red card)	WESTPRESS arena, Dortmund; Attendance: 1,421; Referees: Chiruță, Murariu (ROU)

15 November 2026; 14:00	FTC-Toyota Kovács (Hungary)	28–32	(Denmark) Team Esbjerg	Érd Aréna, Érd; Attendance: 1,900; Referees: Picard, Vauchez (FRA)
15 November 2026; 14:00	Klujber, Møller 6	(13–14)	Hansson 8	Érd Aréna, Érd; Attendance: 1,900; Referees: Picard, Vauchez (FRA)
15 November 2026; 14:00	1× (yellow card) 2× (suspension)	Report	1× (suspension)	Érd Aréna, Érd; Attendance: 1,900; Referees: Picard, Vauchez (FRA)

15 November 2026; 16:00	Sola HK (Norway)	37–27	(Slovenia) RK Krim OTP Group Mercator	Åsenhallen, Sola; Attendance: 748; Referees: Martins, Martins (POR)
15 November 2026; 16:00	Herrem 11	(18–16)	Zulić 6	Åsenhallen, Sola; Attendance: 748; Referees: Martins, Martins (POR)
15 November 2026; 16:00	3× (yellow card) 4× (suspension)	Report	1× (yellow card) 3× (suspension)	Åsenhallen, Sola; Attendance: 748; Referees: Martins, Martins (POR)

15 November 2026; 16:00	OTP Group Budućnost (Montenegro)	25–26	(Germany) Borussia Dortmund	Morača Sports Center, Podgorica; Attendance: 1,000; Referees: Fotakidis, Kinatzidis (GRE)
15 November 2026; 16:00	three players 6	(13–10)	Grijseels 7	Morača Sports Center, Podgorica; Attendance: 1,000; Referees: Fotakidis, Kinatzidis (GRE)
15 November 2026; 16:00	2× (yellow card) 5× (suspension)	Report	5× (suspension)	Morača Sports Center, Podgorica; Attendance: 1,000; Referees: Fotakidis, Kinatzidis (GRE)

15 November 2026; 16:00	CSM București (Romania)	34–30	(France) Brest Bretagne Handball	Polyvalent Hall, Bucharest; Attendance: 3,800; Referees: Cipov, Klus (SVK)
15 November 2026; 16:00	Maslova 10	(18–14)	Lott 10	Polyvalent Hall, Bucharest; Attendance: 3,800; Referees: Cipov, Klus (SVK)
15 November 2026; 16:00	5× (suspension)	Report	1× (suspension)	Polyvalent Hall, Bucharest; Attendance: 3,800; Referees: Cipov, Klus (SVK)

9 January 2027; 16:00	CSM București (Romania)	v	(Hungary) FTC-Toyota Kovács	Polyvalent Hall, Bucharest
9 January 2027; 16:00		Report		Polyvalent Hall, Bucharest

9 January 2027; 20:00	Brest Bretagne Handball (France)	v	(Denmark) Team Esbjerg	Brest Arena, Brest
9 January 2027; 20:00		Report		Brest Arena, Brest

10 January 2027; 14:00	RK Krim OTP Group Mercator (Slovenia)	v	(Germany) Borussia Dortmund	Tivoli Hall, Ljubljana
10 January 2027; 14:00		Report		Tivoli Hall, Ljubljana

10 January 2027; 18:00	Sola HK (Norway)	v	(Montenegro) OTP Group Budućnost	Åsenhallen, Sola
10 January 2027; 18:00		Report		Åsenhallen, Sola

16 January 2027; 16:00	Team Esbjerg (Denmark)	v	(Romania) CSM București	Blue Water Dokken, Esbjerg
16 January 2027; 16:00		Report		Blue Water Dokken, Esbjerg

16 January 2027; 16:00	FTC-Toyota Kovács (Hungary)	v	(France) Brest Bretagne Handball	Érd Aréna, Érd
16 January 2027; 16:00		Report		Érd Aréna, Érd

16 January 2027; 16:00	Borussia Dortmund (Germany)	v	(Norway) Sola HK	Helmut‐Körnig‐Halle, Dortmund
16 January 2027; 16:00		Report		Helmut‐Körnig‐Halle, Dortmund

16 January 2027; 18:00	OTP Group Budućnost (Montenegro)	v	(Slovenia) RK Krim OTP Group Mercator	Morača Sports Center, Podgorica
16 January 2027; 18:00		Report		Morača Sports Center, Podgorica

23 January 2027; 18:00	OTP Group Budućnost (Montenegro)	v	(Denmark) Team Esbjerg	Morača Sports Center, Podgorica
23 January 2027; 18:00		Report		Morača Sports Center, Podgorica

24 January 2027; 14:00	RK Krim OTP Group Mercator (Slovenia)	v	(France) Brest Bretagne Handball	Tivoli Hall, Ljubljana
24 January 2027; 14:00		Report		Tivoli Hall, Ljubljana

24 January 2027; 14:00	Sola HK (Norway)	v	(Romania) CSM București	Åsenhallen, Sola
24 January 2027; 14:00		Report		Åsenhallen, Sola

24 January 2027; 16:00	Borussia Dortmund (Germany)	v	(Hungary) FTC-Toyota Kovács	Helmut‐Körnig‐Halle, Dortmund
24 January 2027; 16:00		Report		Helmut‐Körnig‐Halle, Dortmund

6 February 2027; 16:00	FTC-Toyota Kovács (Hungary)	v	(Norway) Sola HK	Érd Aréna, Érd
6 February 2027; 16:00		Report		Érd Aréna, Érd

6 February 2027; 18:00	Brest Bretagne Handball (France)	v	(Montenegro) OTP Group Budućnost	Brest Arena, Brest
6 February 2027; 18:00		Report		Brest Arena, Brest

7 February 2027; 14:00	Team Esbjerg (Denmark)	v	(Slovenia) RK Krim OTP Group Mercator	Blue Water Dokken, Esbjerg
7 February 2027; 14:00		Report		Blue Water Dokken, Esbjerg

7 February 2027; 16:00	CSM București (Romania)	v	(Germany) Borussia Dortmund	Polyvalent Hall, Bucharest
7 February 2027; 16:00		Report		Polyvalent Hall, Bucharest

13 February 2027; 16:00	OTP Group Budućnost (Montenegro)	v	(Romania) CSM București	Morača Sports Center, Podgorica
13 February 2027; 16:00		Report		Morača Sports Center, Podgorica

14 February 2027; 14:00	RK Krim OTP Group Mercator (Slovenia)	v	(Hungary) FTC-Toyota Kovács	Tivoli Hall, Ljubljana
14 February 2027; 14:00		Report		Tivoli Hall, Ljubljana

14 February 2027; 14:00	Borussia Dortmund (Germany)	v	(France) Brest Bretagne Handball	Helmut‐Körnig‐Halle, Dortmund
14 February 2027; 14:00		Report		Helmut‐Körnig‐Halle, Dortmund

14 February 2027; 16:00	Sola HK (Norway)	v	(Denmark) Team Esbjerg	Åsenhallen, Sola
14 February 2027; 16:00		Report		Åsenhallen, Sola

21 February 2027; 16:00	Team Esbjerg (Denmark)	v	(Germany) Borussia Dortmund	Blue Water Dokken, Esbjerg
21 February 2027; 16:00		Report		Blue Water Dokken, Esbjerg

21 February 2027; 16:00	CSM București (Romania)	v	(Slovenia) RK Krim OTP Group Mercator	Polyvalent Hall, Bucharest
21 February 2027; 16:00		Report		Polyvalent Hall, Bucharest

21 February 2027; 16:00	FTC-Toyota Kovács (Hungary)	v	(Montenegro) OTP Group Budućnost	Érd Aréna, Érd
21 February 2027; 16:00		Report		Érd Aréna, Érd

21 February 2027; 16:00	Brest Bretagne Handball (France)	v	(Norway) Sola HK	Brest Arena, Brest
21 February 2027; 16:00		Report		Brest Arena, Brest

=== Group B ===
Pos	Team	Pld	W	D	L	GF	GA	GD	Pts	Qualification
1	(France) Metz Handball	8	7	1	0	284	216	+68	15	Quarterfinals
2	(Hungary) Győri Audi ETO KC	8	7	1	0	270	210	+60	15	Quarterfinals
3	(Romania) CS Gloria Bistrița	8	5	0	3	253	253	0	10	Playoffs
4	(Norway) Storhamar HE	8	4	0	4	204	217	−13	8	Playoffs
5	(Croatia) HC Podravka Vegeta	8	3	0	5	228	249	−21	6	Playoffs
6	(Denmark) Odense Håndbold	8	2	1	5	236	231	+5	5	Playoffs
7	(Denmark) Nykøbing Falster	8	2	1	5	220	244	−24	5	
8	(Germany) HSG Blomberg-Lippe	8	0	0	8	188	263	−75	0	

Updated to match(es) played on 14 November 2026. Source: EHF
Rules for classification: Tiebreakers

5 September 2026; 18:00	HC Podravka Vegeta (Croatia)	23–26	(Hungary) Győri Audi ETO KC	Josip Samardžija-Bepo Arena, Koprivnica; Attendance: 1,648; Referees: Bozhinovski, Nachevski (MKD)
5 September 2026; 18:00	Barišić, K. Pandza 6	(11–15)	Stanko 8	Josip Samardžija-Bepo Arena, Koprivnica; Attendance: 1,648; Referees: Bozhinovski, Nachevski (MKD)
5 September 2026; 18:00	3× (suspension)	Report	4× (suspension)	Josip Samardžija-Bepo Arena, Koprivnica; Attendance: 1,648; Referees: Bozhinovski, Nachevski (MKD)

5 September 2026; 18:00	Storhamar HE (Norway)	23–32	(France) Metz Handball	OBOS Arena, Hamar; Attendance: 803; Referees: Dáné, Marton (HUN)
5 September 2026; 18:00	Hagen 5	(10–17)	three players 6	OBOS Arena, Hamar; Attendance: 803; Referees: Dáné, Marton (HUN)
5 September 2026; 18:00	1× (yellow card) 3× (suspension)	Report	2× (suspension)	OBOS Arena, Hamar; Attendance: 803; Referees: Dáné, Marton (HUN)

6 September 2026; 14:00	HSG Blomberg-Lippe (Germany)	23−28	(Romania) CS Gloria Bistrița	Lipperlandhalle, Lemgo; Attendance: 1,113; Referees: Weijmans, Wolbertus (NED)
6 September 2026; 14:00	Kühne, Njinkeu 5	(10−13)	So Delgado 7	Lipperlandhalle, Lemgo; Attendance: 1,113; Referees: Weijmans, Wolbertus (NED)
6 September 2026; 14:00	1× (suspension)	Report	1× (yellow card) 3× (suspension)	Lipperlandhalle, Lemgo; Attendance: 1,113; Referees: Weijmans, Wolbertus (NED)

6 September 2026; 16:00	Nykøbing Falster (Denmark)	27–27	(Denmark) Odense Håndbold	Lånlet Arena, Nykøbing Falster; Attendance: 1,812; Referees: Barysas, Petrusis (LTU)
6 September 2026; 16:00	Lerby 12	(16–16)	Vyakhireva 6	Lånlet Arena, Nykøbing Falster; Attendance: 1,812; Referees: Barysas, Petrusis (LTU)
6 September 2026; 16:00	1× (yellow card) 4× (suspension)	Report	3× (suspension)	Lånlet Arena, Nykøbing Falster; Attendance: 1,812; Referees: Barysas, Petrusis (LTU)

12 September 2026; 16:00	HSG Blomberg-Lippe (Germany)	23–27	(Norway) Storhamar HE	Lipperlandhalle, Lemgo; Attendance: 617; Referees: Cipov, Klus (SVK)
12 September 2026; 16:00	Kühne 6	(9–10)	Pedersen, Venn 6	Lipperlandhalle, Lemgo; Attendance: 617; Referees: Cipov, Klus (SVK)
12 September 2026; 16:00	3× (suspension)	Report	4× (suspension)	Lipperlandhalle, Lemgo; Attendance: 617; Referees: Cipov, Klus (SVK)

12 September 2026; 18:00	Győri Audi ETO KC (Hungary)	35–25	(Denmark) Nykøbing Falster	Audi Aréna, Győr; Attendance: 3,872; Referees: Duplii, Karpushchenko (UKR)
12 September 2026; 18:00	Hovden 11	(18–10)	Lerby 8	Audi Aréna, Győr; Attendance: 3,872; Referees: Duplii, Karpushchenko (UKR)
12 September 2026; 18:00	2× (suspension)	Report	1× (suspension)	Audi Aréna, Győr; Attendance: 3,872; Referees: Duplii, Karpushchenko (UKR)

13 September 2026; 14:00	Odense Håndbold (Denmark)	31–24	(Croatia) HC Podravka Vegeta	Sydbank Arena Odense, Odense; Attendance: 1,698; Referees: Cournil, Lamour (FRA)
13 September 2026; 14:00	Bakkerud 8	(16–10)	K. Pandza 11	Sydbank Arena Odense, Odense; Attendance: 1,698; Referees: Cournil, Lamour (FRA)
13 September 2026; 14:00	1× (yellow card) 3× (suspension)	Report	1× (yellow card) 3× (suspension)	Sydbank Arena Odense, Odense; Attendance: 1,698; Referees: Cournil, Lamour (FRA)

13 September 2026; 16:00	Metz Handball (France)	40–26	(Romania) CS Gloria Bistrița	Arènes de Metz, Metz; Attendance: 3,693; Referees: Fotakidis, Kinatzidis (GRE)
13 September 2026; 16:00	Jørgensen 8	(17–11)	Paulo 6	Arènes de Metz, Metz; Attendance: 3,693; Referees: Fotakidis, Kinatzidis (GRE)
13 September 2026; 16:00	4× (suspension)	Report	1× (yellow card) 2× (suspension)	Arènes de Metz, Metz; Attendance: 3,693; Referees: Fotakidis, Kinatzidis (GRE)

19 September 2026; 18:00	HC Podravka Vegeta (Croatia)	24–35	(France) Metz Handball	Josip Samardžija-Bepo Arena, Koprivnica; Attendance: 1,230; Referees: Bočáková, Jánošíková (SVK)
19 September 2026; 18:00	K. Pandza 6	(11–12)	Errard 8	Josip Samardžija-Bepo Arena, Koprivnica; Attendance: 1,230; Referees: Bočáková, Jánošíková (SVK)
19 September 2026; 18:00	5× (suspension)	Report	2× (suspension)	Josip Samardžija-Bepo Arena, Koprivnica; Attendance: 1,230; Referees: Bočáková, Jánošíková (SVK)

20 September 2026; 14:00	Storhamar HE (Norway)	20–30	(Hungary) Győri Audi ETO KC	OBOS Arena, Hamar; Attendance: 1,304; Referees: Oyarzun, Zaragueta (ESP)
20 September 2026; 14:00	Pedersen 5	(13–20)	Elver 9	OBOS Arena, Hamar; Attendance: 1,304; Referees: Oyarzun, Zaragueta (ESP)
20 September 2026; 14:00	1× (yellow card)	Report	1× (yellow card) 4× (suspension)	OBOS Arena, Hamar; Attendance: 1,304; Referees: Oyarzun, Zaragueta (ESP)

20 September 2026; 14:00	Nykøbing Falster (Denmark)	31–26	(Germany) HSG Blomberg-Lippe	Lånlet Arena, Nykøbing Falster; Attendance: 1,458; Referees: Picard, Vauchez (FRA)
20 September 2026; 14:00	Lerby 9	(15–14)	Bucher 7	Lånlet Arena, Nykøbing Falster; Attendance: 1,458; Referees: Picard, Vauchez (FRA)
20 September 2026; 14:00	2× (yellow card) 2× (suspension)	Report	2× (suspension)	Lånlet Arena, Nykøbing Falster; Attendance: 1,458; Referees: Picard, Vauchez (FRA)

20 September 2026; 16:00	CS Gloria Bistrița (Romania)	29–27	(Denmark) Odense Håndbold	TeraPlast Arena, Bistrița; Attendance: 2,850; Referees: Backović, Palačković (SLO)
20 September 2026; 16:00	Reichert 7	(15–14)	Halilcevic, Leuchter 6	TeraPlast Arena, Bistrița; Attendance: 2,850; Referees: Backović, Palačković (SLO)
20 September 2026; 16:00	1× (yellow card) 3× (suspension)	Report	3× (suspension)	TeraPlast Arena, Bistrița; Attendance: 2,850; Referees: Backović, Palačković (SLO)

3 October 2026; 16:00	HSG Blomberg-Lippe (Germany)	31–33	(Croatia) HC Podravka Vegeta	Lipperlandhalle, Lemgo; Attendance: 703; Referees: Fremstad, Jørstad (NOR)
3 October 2026; 16:00	Kühne 11	(15–13)	Šošo 11	Lipperlandhalle, Lemgo; Attendance: 703; Referees: Fremstad, Jørstad (NOR)
3 October 2026; 16:00	1× (suspension)	Report	1× (yellow card) 3× (suspension)	Lipperlandhalle, Lemgo; Attendance: 703; Referees: Fremstad, Jørstad (NOR)

3 October 2026; 18:00	Metz Handball (France)	36–25	(Denmark) Nykøbing Falster	Arènes de Metz, Metz; Attendance: 3,482; Referees: Jakovljević, Kovačević (SRB)
3 October 2026; 18:00	four players 5	(18–11)	Svele 9	Arènes de Metz, Metz; Attendance: 3,482; Referees: Jakovljević, Kovačević (SRB)
3 October 2026; 18:00	1× (yellow card) 3× (suspension)	Report	1× (yellow card) 3× (suspension)	Arènes de Metz, Metz; Attendance: 3,482; Referees: Jakovljević, Kovačević (SRB)

3 October 2026; 18:00	Győri Audi ETO KC (Hungary)	36–32	(Romania) CS Gloria Bistrița	Audi Aréna, Győr; Attendance: 3,800; Referees: Bočáková, Jánošíková (SVK)
3 October 2026; 18:00	De Paula 7	(20–16)	Reichert 14	Audi Aréna, Győr; Attendance: 3,800; Referees: Bočáková, Jánošíková (SVK)
3 October 2026; 18:00	1× (yellow card) 2× (suspension)	Report	2× (suspension)	Audi Aréna, Győr; Attendance: 3,800; Referees: Bočáková, Jánošíková (SVK)

4 October 2026; 16:00	Odense Håndbold (Denmark)	23–26	(Norway) Storhamar HE	Sydbank Arena Odense, Odense; Attendance: 1,915; Referees: Duplii, Karpushchenko (UKR)
4 October 2026; 16:00	Fauske, Højlund 4	(12–11)	Hagen 6	Sydbank Arena Odense, Odense; Attendance: 1,915; Referees: Duplii, Karpushchenko (UKR)
4 October 2026; 16:00	1× (yellow card) 2× (suspension)	Report	3× (suspension)	Sydbank Arena Odense, Odense; Attendance: 1,915; Referees: Duplii, Karpushchenko (UKR)

10 October 2026; 16:00	Győri Audi ETO KC (Hungary)	34–34	(France) Metz Handball	Audi Aréna, Győr; Attendance: 4,896; Referees: Backović, Palačković (SLO)
10 October 2026; 16:00	Housheer 10	(19–20)	three players 5	Audi Aréna, Győr; Attendance: 4,896; Referees: Backović, Palačković (SLO)
10 October 2026; 16:00	2× (yellow card) 3× (suspension)	Report	1× (yellow card) 1× (suspension) 1× (red card)	Audi Aréna, Győr; Attendance: 4,896; Referees: Backović, Palačković (SLO)

11 October 2026; 14:00	HSG Blomberg-Lippe (Germany)	18–35	(Denmark) Odense Håndbold	Lipperlandhalle, Lemgo; Attendance: 1,066; Referees: Stancu (ROU), Pepe (ITA)
11 October 2026; 14:00	Kühne 4	(10–20)	Maarschalkerweerd, Vyakhireva 6	Lipperlandhalle, Lemgo; Attendance: 1,066; Referees: Stancu (ROU), Pepe (ITA)
11 October 2026; 14:00	1× (yellow card) 4× (suspension)	Report		Lipperlandhalle, Lemgo; Attendance: 1,066; Referees: Stancu (ROU), Pepe (ITA)

11 October 2026; 16:00	Storhamar HE (Norway)	33–25	(Croatia) HC Podravka Vegeta	OBOS Arena, Hamar; Attendance: 806; Referees: Lesiak, Lidacka (POL)
11 October 2026; 16:00	Pedersen 9	(12–10)	K. Pandza 6	OBOS Arena, Hamar; Attendance: 806; Referees: Lesiak, Lidacka (POL)
11 October 2026; 16:00	1× (yellow card) 3× (suspension)	Report	1× (yellow card) 6× (suspension) 1× (red card)	OBOS Arena, Hamar; Attendance: 806; Referees: Lesiak, Lidacka (POL)

11 October 2026; 18:00	Nykøbing Falster (Denmark)	35–38	(Romania) CS Gloria Bistrița	Lånlet Arena, Nykøbing Falster; Attendance: 1,628; Referees: Martins, Martins (POR)
11 October 2026; 18:00	Lerby, Svele 8	(15–19)	Reichert 9	Lånlet Arena, Nykøbing Falster; Attendance: 1,628; Referees: Martins, Martins (POR)
11 October 2026; 18:00	1× (yellow card) 5× (suspension)	Report	1× (yellow card) 2× (suspension)	Lånlet Arena, Nykøbing Falster; Attendance: 1,628; Referees: Martins, Martins (POR)

17 October 2026; 16:00	CS Gloria Bistrița (Romania)	33–26	(Norway) Storhamar HE	TeraPlast Arena, Bistrița; Attendance: 3,000; Referees: Jakovljević, Kovačević (SRB)
17 October 2026; 16:00	So Delgado 10	(17–15)	Marsenić 6	TeraPlast Arena, Bistrița; Attendance: 3,000; Referees: Jakovljević, Kovačević (SRB)
17 October 2026; 16:00	1× (yellow card) 2× (suspension)	Report	1× (suspension)	TeraPlast Arena, Bistrița; Attendance: 3,000; Referees: Jakovljević, Kovačević (SRB)

17 October 2026; 18:00	Metz Handball (France)	32–22	(Germany) HSG Blomberg-Lippe	Arènes de Metz, Metz; Attendance: 3,181; Referees: Chiruță, Murariu (ROU)
17 October 2026; 18:00	Borg 6	(16–13)	Bucher, Mühlner 7	Arènes de Metz, Metz; Attendance: 3,181; Referees: Chiruță, Murariu (ROU)
17 October 2026; 18:00	1× (suspension)	Report	3× (suspension)	Arènes de Metz, Metz; Attendance: 3,181; Referees: Chiruță, Murariu (ROU)

17 October 2026; 18:00	Odense Håndbold (Denmark)	31–32	(Hungary) Győri Audi ETO KC	Sydbank Arena Odense, Odense; Attendance: 2,203; Referees: Fremstad, Jørstad (NOR)
17 October 2026; 18:00	Maarschalkerweerd 8	(17–20)	Stanko 8	Sydbank Arena Odense, Odense; Attendance: 2,203; Referees: Fremstad, Jørstad (NOR)
17 October 2026; 18:00	1× (suspension)	Report	5× (suspension)	Sydbank Arena Odense, Odense; Attendance: 2,203; Referees: Fremstad, Jørstad (NOR)

18 October 2026; 14:00	HC Podravka Vegeta (Croatia)	33–26	(Denmark) Nykøbing Falster	Josip Samardžija-Bepo Arena, Koprivnica; Attendance: 1,321; Referees: Stancu (ROU), Pepe (ITA)
18 October 2026; 14:00	Šošo 7	(18–13)	Lerby 8	Josip Samardžija-Bepo Arena, Koprivnica; Attendance: 1,321; Referees: Stancu (ROU), Pepe (ITA)
18 October 2026; 14:00	5× (suspension)	Report	2× (yellow card) 4× (suspension) 1× (red card)	Josip Samardžija-Bepo Arena, Koprivnica; Attendance: 1,321; Referees: Stancu (ROU), Pepe (ITA)

7 November 2026; 18:00	Nykøbing Falster (Denmark)	25–31	(Norway) Storhamar HE	Lånlet Arena, Nykøbing Falster; Attendance: 1,845; Referees: Bozhinovski, Nachevski (MKD)
7 November 2026; 18:00	Svele 9	(12–22)	Pedersen 7	Lånlet Arena, Nykøbing Falster; Attendance: 1,845; Referees: Bozhinovski, Nachevski (MKD)
7 November 2026; 18:00	2× (suspension)	Report	3× (suspension)	Lånlet Arena, Nykøbing Falster; Attendance: 1,845; Referees: Bozhinovski, Nachevski (MKD)

7 November 2026; 18:00	HSG Blomberg-Lippe (Germany)	21–36	(Hungary) Győri Audi ETO KC	Lipperlandhalle, Lemgo; Attendance: 1,023; Referees: Martinović, Pavićević (MNE)
7 November 2026; 18:00	Kühne 5	(12–19)	De Paula 6	Lipperlandhalle, Lemgo; Attendance: 1,023; Referees: Martinović, Pavićević (MNE)
7 November 2026; 18:00	2× (suspension)	Report	1× (yellow card) 2× (suspension)	Lipperlandhalle, Lemgo; Attendance: 1,023; Referees: Martinović, Pavićević (MNE)

8 November 2026; 16:00	CS Gloria Bistrița (Romania)	33–29	(Croatia) HC Podravka Vegeta	TeraPlast Arena, Bistrița; Attendance: 2,950; Referees: Dáné, Marton (HUN)
8 November 2026; 16:00	Paulo 7	(14–15)	K. Pandza 10	TeraPlast Arena, Bistrița; Attendance: 2,950; Referees: Dáné, Marton (HUN)
8 November 2026; 16:00	6× (suspension)	Report	1× (yellow card) 5× (suspension)	TeraPlast Arena, Bistrița; Attendance: 2,950; Referees: Dáné, Marton (HUN)

8 November 2026; 16:00	Metz Handball (France)	33–31	(Denmark) Odense Håndbold	Arènes de Metz, Metz; Attendance: 3,640; Referees: Thiyagarajah, Thiyagarajah (GER)
8 November 2026; 16:00	three players 5	(15–16)	Bakkerud 10	Arènes de Metz, Metz; Attendance: 3,640; Referees: Thiyagarajah, Thiyagarajah (GER)
8 November 2026; 16:00	3× (suspension)	Report	2× (suspension)	Arènes de Metz, Metz; Attendance: 3,640; Referees: Thiyagarajah, Thiyagarajah (GER)

14 November 2026; 16:00	Storhamar HE (Norway)	18–26	(Denmark) Nykøbing Falster	OBOS Arena, Hamar; Attendance: 1,100; Referees: Bolic, Hurich (AUT)
14 November 2026; 16:00	Pedersen 8	(11–14)	Magnussen 7	OBOS Arena, Hamar; Attendance: 1,100; Referees: Bolic, Hurich (AUT)
14 November 2026; 16:00	1× (yellow card) 1× (suspension)	Report	1× (yellow card) 1× (suspension)	OBOS Arena, Hamar; Attendance: 1,100; Referees: Bolic, Hurich (AUT)

14 November 2026; 18:00	Győri Audi ETO KC (Hungary)	41–24	(Germany) HSG Blomberg-Lippe	Audi Aréna, Győr; Attendance: 3,976; Referees: Cournil, Lamour (FRA)
14 November 2026; 18:00	Housheer 7	(19–14)	Njinkeu 6	Audi Aréna, Győr; Attendance: 3,976; Referees: Cournil, Lamour (FRA)
14 November 2026; 18:00	1× (suspension)	Report	1× (suspension)	Audi Aréna, Győr; Attendance: 3,976; Referees: Cournil, Lamour (FRA)

14 November 2026; 18:00	HC Podravka Vegeta (Croatia)	37–34	(Romania) CS Gloria Bistrița	Josip Samardžija-Bepo Arena, Koprivnica; Attendance: 1,882; Referees: Oyarzun, Zaragueta (ESP)
14 November 2026; 18:00	Šošo 7	(19–19)	So Delgado 12	Josip Samardžija-Bepo Arena, Koprivnica; Attendance: 1,882; Referees: Oyarzun, Zaragueta (ESP)
14 November 2026; 18:00	2× (yellow card) 3× (suspension)	Report	1× (yellow card) 8× (suspension) 1× (red card)	Josip Samardžija-Bepo Arena, Koprivnica; Attendance: 1,882; Referees: Oyarzun, Zaragueta (ESP)

15 November 2026; 18:00	Odense Håndbold (Denmark)	31–42	(France) Metz Handball	Sydbank Arena Odense, Odense; Attendance: 2,021; Referees: Lesiak, Lidacka (POL)
15 November 2026; 18:00	Vyakhireva 7	(12–19)	Ngombele 7	Sydbank Arena Odense, Odense; Attendance: 2,021; Referees: Lesiak, Lidacka (POL)
15 November 2026; 18:00	1× (yellow card) 1× (suspension)	Report	1× (yellow card) 5× (suspension) 1× (red card)	Sydbank Arena Odense, Odense; Attendance: 2,021; Referees: Lesiak, Lidacka (POL)

9 January 2027; 18:00	Győri Audi ETO KC (Hungary)	v	(Denmark) Odense Håndbold	Audi Aréna, Győr
9 January 2027; 18:00		Report		Audi Aréna, Győr

9 January 2027; 18:00	Storhamar HE (Norway)	v	(Romania) CS Gloria Bistrița	OBOS Arena, Hamar
9 January 2027; 18:00		Report		OBOS Arena, Hamar

10 January 2027; 16:00	HSG Blomberg-Lippe (Germany)	v	(France) Metz Handball	Lipperlandhalle, Lemgo
10 January 2027; 16:00		Report		Lipperlandhalle, Lemgo

10 January 2027; 16:00	Nykøbing Falster (Denmark)	v	(Croatia) HC Podravka Vegeta	Lånlet Arena, Nykøbing Falster
10 January 2027; 16:00		Report		Lånlet Arena, Nykøbing Falster

16 January 2027; 20:00	Metz Handball (France)	v	(Hungary) Győri Audi ETO KC	Arènes de Metz, Metz
16 January 2027; 20:00		Report		Arènes de Metz, Metz

17 January 2027; 14:00	HC Podravka Vegeta (Croatia)	v	(Norway) Storhamar HE	Josip Samardžija-Bepo Arena, Koprivnica
17 January 2027; 14:00		Report		Josip Samardžija-Bepo Arena, Koprivnica

17 January 2027; 16:00	CS Gloria Bistrița (Romania)	v	(Denmark) Nykøbing Falster	TeraPlast Arena, Bistrița
17 January 2027; 16:00		Report		TeraPlast Arena, Bistrița

17 January 2027; 18:00	Odense Håndbold (Denmark)	v	(Germany) HSG Blomberg-Lippe	Sydbank Arena Odense, Odense
17 January 2027; 18:00		Report		Sydbank Arena Odense, Odense

23 January 2027; 16:00	CS Gloria Bistrița (Romania)	v	(Hungary) Győri Audi ETO KC	TeraPlast Arena, Bistrița
23 January 2027; 16:00		Report		TeraPlast Arena, Bistrița

23 January 2027; 16:00	Storhamar HE (Norway)	v	(Denmark) Odense Håndbold	OBOS Arena, Hamar
23 January 2027; 16:00		Report		OBOS Arena, Hamar

23 January 2027; 18:00	HC Podravka Vegeta (Croatia)	v	(Germany) HSG Blomberg-Lippe	Josip Samardžija-Bepo Arena, Koprivnica
23 January 2027; 18:00		Report		Josip Samardžija-Bepo Arena, Koprivnica

24 January 2027; 18:00	Nykøbing Falster (Denmark)	v	(France) Metz Handball	Lånlet Arena, Nykøbing Falster
24 January 2027; 18:00		Report		Lånlet Arena, Nykøbing Falster

6 February 2027; 16:00	Odense Håndbold (Denmark)	v	(Romania) CS Gloria Bistrița	Sydbank Arena Odense, Odense
6 February 2027; 16:00		Report		Sydbank Arena Odense, Odense

6 February 2027; 18:00	Győri Audi ETO KC (Hungary)	v	(Norway) Storhamar HE	Audi Aréna, Győr
6 February 2027; 18:00		Report		Audi Aréna, Győr

6 February 2027; 18:00	HSG Blomberg-Lippe (Germany)	v	(Denmark) Nykøbing Falster	Lipperlandhalle, Lemgo
6 February 2027; 18:00		Report		Lipperlandhalle, Lemgo

6 February 2027; 20:00	Metz Handball (France)	v	(Croatia) HC Podravka Vegeta	Arènes de Metz, Metz
6 February 2027; 20:00		Report		Arènes de Metz, Metz

13 February 2027; 16:00	Storhamar HE (Norway)	v	(Germany) HSG Blomberg-Lippe	OBOS Arena, Hamar
13 February 2027; 16:00		Report		OBOS Arena, Hamar

13 February 2027; 18:00	HC Podravka Vegeta (Croatia)	v	(Denmark) Odense Håndbold	Josip Samardžija-Bepo Arena, Koprivnica
13 February 2027; 18:00		Report		Josip Samardžija-Bepo Arena, Koprivnica

14 February 2027; 16:00	CS Gloria Bistrița (Romania)	v	(France) Metz Handball	TeraPlast Arena, Bistrița
14 February 2027; 16:00		Report		TeraPlast Arena, Bistrița

14 February 2027; 18:00	Nykøbing Falster (Denmark)	v	(Hungary) Győri Audi ETO KC	Lånlet Arena, Nykøbing Falster
14 February 2027; 18:00		Report		Lånlet Arena, Nykøbing Falster

20 February 2027; 18:00	Metz Handball (France)	v	(Norway) Storhamar HE	Arènes de Metz, Metz
20 February 2027; 18:00		Report		Arènes de Metz, Metz

20 February 2027; 18:00	Győri Audi ETO KC (Hungary)	v	(Croatia) HC Podravka Vegeta	Audi Aréna, Győr
20 February 2027; 18:00		Report		Audi Aréna, Győr

20 February 2027; 18:00	Odense Håndbold (Denmark)	v	(Denmark) Nykøbing Falster	Sydbank Arena Odense, Odense
20 February 2027; 18:00		Report		Sydbank Arena Odense, Odense

20 February 2027; 18:00	CS Gloria Bistrița (Romania)	v	(Germany) HSG Blomberg-Lippe	TeraPlast Arena, Bistrița
20 February 2027; 18:00		Report		TeraPlast Arena, Bistrița
