= 2026–27 Women's EHF Champions League =

European handball tournament

Women's EHF Champions League
- 2026–27

Tournament information
- Sport: Handball
- Dates: 5 September 2026–30 May 2027
- Teams: 16
- Website: ehfcl.com

Tournament statistics
- Matches played: 64
- Goals scored: 3478 (54.34 per match)
- Attendance: 115,364 (1,803 per match)
- Top scorer(s): Henny Reistad (64 goals)

The 2026–27 Women's EHF Champions League is the 34th edition of Europe's premier club handball tournament, running from 5 September 2026 to 30 May 2027.

== Format ==
The tournament will use the same format as the previous seasons. The competition begins with a group stage featuring sixteen teams divided into two groups. Matches will be played in a double round-robin system with home-and-away fixtures, fourteen in total for each team. In Groups A and B, the top two teams automatically qualify for the quarter-finals, with teams ranked 3rd to 6th enter the playoff round.

The knockout stage include four rounds: the playoffs, quarter-finals, and a final-four tournament comprising two semifinals and the final. In the playoffs, eight teams will be paired against each other in two-legged home-and-away matches (third-placed in group A plays sixth-placed group B; fourth-placed group A plays fifth-placed group B, etc.). The four aggregate winners of the playoffs advance to the quarterfinals, joining the top-two teams of Groups A and B. The eight quarterfinalist teams will be paired against each other in two-legged home-and-away matches, with the four aggregate winners qualifying to the final-four tournament.

In the final four tournament, the semifinals and the final will be played as single matches at a pre-selected host venue.

== Rankings ==
The rankings are based on the performances from the three most recent seasons.

- Associations 1–9 have their league champion qualify for the group stage and apply up to two wildcards.
- The best-ranked association in the Women's EHF European League can have its league champion and runner-up qualified for the group stage and can apply for one wildcard.
- Associations below the top 9 have their league champion apply for a wildcard..

Rank	Association	Average points	Teams
1	Hungary	227.67	1
2	Denmark	169.00	1
3	France	145.33	2
4	Norway	142.23	1
5	Romania	114.33	1
6	Germany	110.67	1
7	Slovenia	78.00	1
8	Croatia	52.00	1
9	Montenegro	46.33	1

Rank	Association	Average points	Teams
10	Turkey	29.00	0
11	Sweden	26.00	0
12	Poland	26.00	0
13	Czech Republic	26.00	0
14	All other associations	0.00	0

== Teams ==
17 teams applied for a place, with ten having a fixed place. The full list was announced on 22 June 2026.

(Hungary) Győri Audi ETO KC (1st)	(Norway) Storhamar HE (2nd)	(Denmark) Team Esbjerg (1st)	(Germany) HSG Blomberg-Lippe (1st)
(France) Brest Bretagne Handball (1st)	(Romania) CS Gloria Bistrița (1st)	(Slovenia) RK Krim OTP Group Mercator (1st)	(Montenegro) OTP Group Budućnost (1st)
(France) Metz Handball (2nd)	(Croatia) HC Podravka Vegeta (1st)	(Denmark) Odense Håndbold (2nd) ^{U}	(Denmark) Nykøbing Falster (3rd) ^{U}
(Germany) Borussia Dortmund (2nd) ^{U}	(Hungary) FTC-Toyota Kovács (2nd) ^{U}	(Norway) Sola HK (1st) ^{U}	(Romania) CSM București (2nd) ^{U}

- ^{U} Confirmed upgrades

Rejected upgrades

(Norway) Molde Elite (3rd)

== Draw ==
The draw took place on 26 June 2026.

== Group stage ==
Location of teams of the 2026–27 Women's EHF Champions League group stage.
Red: Group A; Blue: Group B.

=== Group A ===
Pos	Team	Pld	W	D	L	GF	GA	GD	Pts	Qualification	ESB	FER	BRE	BUC	DOR	SOL	BUD	KRI
1	(Denmark) Team Esbjerg	8	7	0	1	252	215	+37	14	Quarterfinals	—	29–26	35–26	16 Jan	21 Feb	28–25	27–21	7 Feb
2	(Hungary) FTC-Toyota Kovács	8	6	0	2	247	211	+36	12	Quarterfinals	28–32	—	16 Jan	24–23	39–25	6 Feb	21 Feb	40–29
3	(France) Brest Bretagne Handball	8	5	0	3	242	223	+19	10	Playoffs	9 Jan	28–33	—	40–25	34–24	21 Feb	6 Feb	28–25
4	(Romania) CSM București	8	4	0	4	243	245	−2	8	Playoffs	34–31	9 Jan	34–30	—	7 Feb	22–30	36–26	21 Feb
5	(Germany) Borussia Dortmund	8	4	0	4	227	246	−19	8	Playoffs	24–33	24 Jan	14 Feb	35–32	—	16 Jan	24–25	37–31
6	(Norway) Sola HK	8	3	0	5	220	211	+9	6	Playoffs	14 Feb	25–28	25–29	24 Jan	27–32	—	10 Jan	37–27
7	(Montenegro) OTP Group Budućnost	8	2	0	6	185	215	−30	4		23 Jan	20–29	22–27	13 Feb	25–26	23–22	—	16 Jan
8	(Slovenia) RK Krim OTP Group Mercator	8	1	0	7	218	268	−50	2		31–37	14 Feb	24 Jan	29–37	10 Jan	22–29	24–23	—

Updated to match(es) played on 15 November 2026. Source: EHF
Rules for classification: Tiebreakers

=== Group B ===
Pos	Team	Pld	W	D	L	GF	GA	GD	Pts	Qualification	MET	GYO	BIS	STO	POD	ODE	NYK	BLO
1	(France) Metz Handball	8	7	1	0	284	216	+68	15	Quarterfinals	—	16 Jan	40–26	20 Feb	6 Feb	33–31	36–25	32–22
2	(Hungary) Győri Audi ETO KC	8	7	1	0	270	210	+60	15	Quarterfinals	34–34	—	36–32	6 Feb	20 Feb	9 Jan	35–25	41–24
3	(Romania) CS Gloria Bistrița	8	5	0	3	253	253	0	10	Playoffs	14 Feb	23 Jan	—	33–26	33–29	29–27	17 Jan	20 Feb
4	(Norway) Storhamar HE	8	4	0	4	204	217	−13	8	Playoffs	23–32	20–30	9 Jan	—	33–25	23 Jan	18–26	13 Feb
5	(Croatia) HC Podravka Vegeta	8	3	0	5	228	249	−21	6	Playoffs	24–35	23–26	37–34	17 Jan	—	13 Feb	33–26	23 Jan
6	(Denmark) Odense Håndbold	8	2	1	5	236	231	+5	5	Playoffs	31–42	31–32	6 Feb	23–26	31–24	—	20 Feb	17 Jan
7	(Denmark) Nykøbing Falster	8	2	1	5	220	244	−24	5		24 Jan	14 Feb	35–38	25–31	10 Jan	27–27	—	31–26
8	(Germany) HSG Blomberg-Lippe	8	0	0	8	188	263	−75	0		10 Jan	21–36	23−28	23–27	31–33	18–35	6 Feb	—

Updated to match(es) played on 14 November 2026. Source: EHF
Rules for classification: Tiebreakers

== Knockout stage ==
=== Playoffs ===
Team 1	Agg.	Team 2	1st leg	2nd leg
B6	M1	A3	20–21 Mar	27–28 Mar
A6	M2	B3	20–21 Mar	27–28 Mar
B5	M3	A4	20–21 Mar	27–28 Mar
A5	M4	B4	20–21 Mar	27–28 Mar

=== Quarterfinals ===
Team 1	Agg.	Team 2	1st leg	2nd leg
M4	–	A1	24–25 Apr	1–2 May
M3	–	B1	24–25 Apr	1–2 May
M2	–	A2	24–25 Apr	1–2 May
M1	–	B2	24–25 Apr	1–2 May

=== Final four ===
The final four will be held at the MVM Dome in Budapest, Hungary on 29 and 30 May 2027.

==== Bracket ====
Semi-finals
29 May
29 May

Final
30 May
Third place
30 May

==== Final ====
30 May 2027	WSF1	v	WSF2	MVM Dome, Budapest

== Top goalscorers ==
As of 15 November 2026

Rank	Player	Club	Goals
1	(Norway) Henny Reistad	(Denmark) Team Esbjerg	64
2	(Sweden) Clara Lerby	(Denmark) Nykøbing Falster	59
3	(Spain) Danila So Delgado	(Romania) CS Gloria Bistrița	53
4	(Austria) Katarina Pandza	(Croatia) HC Podravka Vegeta	52
5	(Russia) Valeriia Maslova	(Romania) CSM București	51
5	(Norway) Mia Svele	(Denmark) Nykøbing Falster	51
7	(Montenegro) Đurđina Jauković	(Montenegro) OTP Group Budućnost	47
7	(Austria) Johanna Reichert	(Romania) CS Gloria Bistrița	47
9	(Norway) Camilla Herrem	(Norway) Sola HK	45
9	(Denmark) Christina Pedersen	(Norway) Storhamar HE	45

== See also ==
- 2026–27 EHF Champions League
- 2026–27 EHF European League
- 2026–27 EHF European Cup
- 2026–27 Women's EHF European League
- 2026–27 Women's EHF European Cup
