= Berglie =

Berglie is a Norwegian surname. Notable people with the surname include:

- Fredrik Berglie (born 1996), Norwegian footballer
- Tonje Berglie (born 1992), Norwegian female handballer
- Sverre Berglie (1910–1985), Norwegian footballer
