= Lene Rantala =

Danish handball player (born 1968)

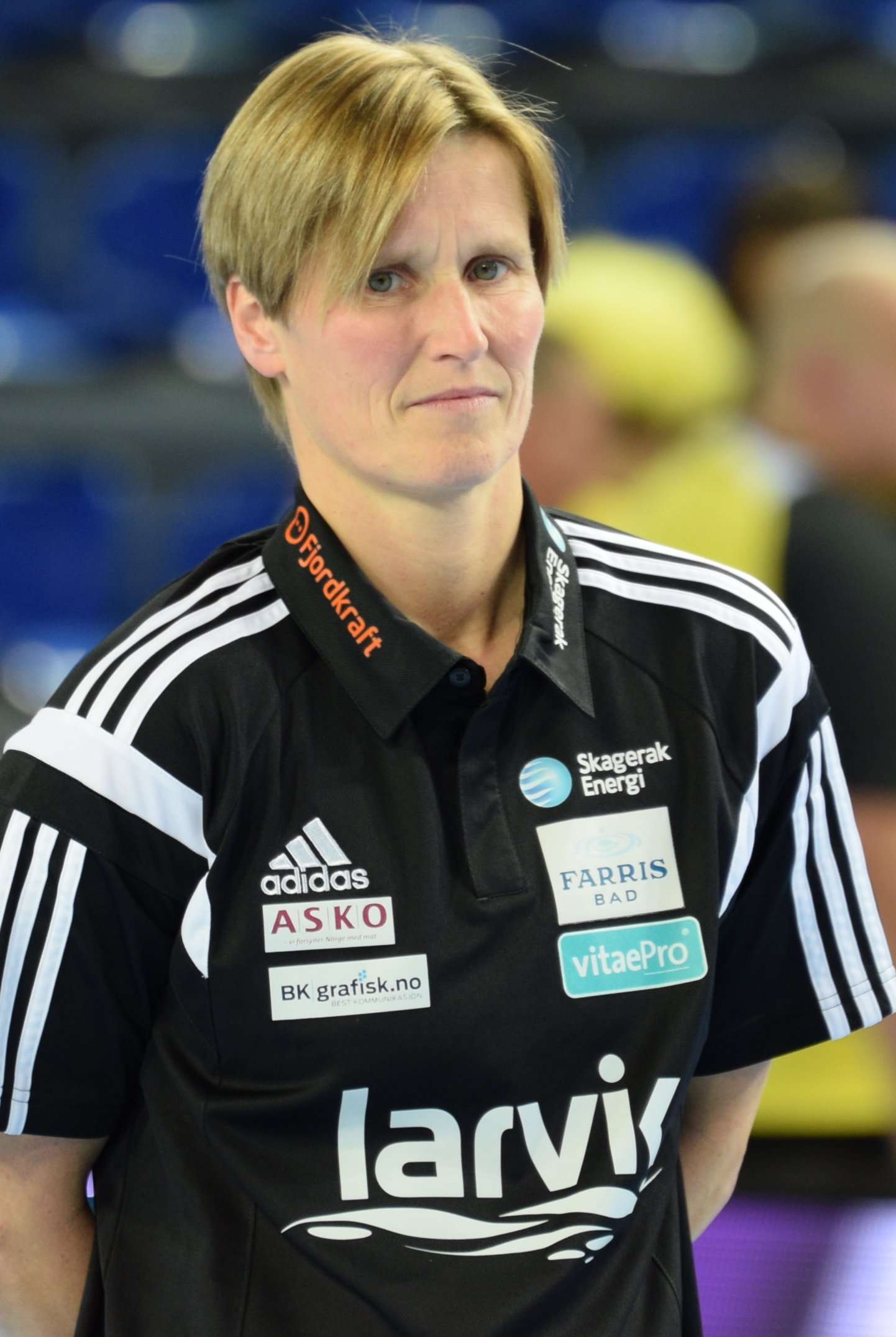

Personal information
- Nationality: Danish
- Born: 10 August 1968 (age 58) Gladsaxe, Denmark
- Height: 1.80 m (5 ft 11 in)

Sport
- Sport: Handball
- Position: Goalkeeper
- Current club: Retired

Senior clubs
- Years: Team
- 1900–1993: FIF
- 1993–1994: Brabrand
- 1994–1996: Toten HK
- 1996–1997: IK Junkeren
- 1997–2014: Larvik HK
National team
| Years | Team | Apps | (Gls) |
| 1991–2007 | Denmark | 226 | (0) |

Teams managed
- 2014–2019: Larvik HK (Team manager)
- 2018–2019: Netherlands (GK coach)
- 2019: Larvik HK (Head coach)
- 2019–2023: Vipers Kristiansand (GK coach)
- 2023–01/2025: Vipers Kristiansand (Assistant coach)
Medal record
Women's handball
Representing Denmark
Olympic Games
| Gold medal – first place | 1996 Atlanta | Team |
| Gold medal – first place | 2000 Sydney | Team |
World Championship
| Gold medal – first place | 1997 Germany | Team |
| Silver medal – second place | 1993 Norway | Team |
| Bronze medal – third place | 1995 Austria/Hungary | Team |
European Championship
| Gold medal – first place | 1994 Germany | Team |
| Gold medal – first place | 1996 Denmark | Team |
| Gold medal – first place | 2002 Denmark | Team |
| Silver medal – second place | 1998 Netherlands | Team |

Lene Rantala (born 10 August 1968) is a Danish former handball player and handball coach, two times Olympic champion and a World champion. Rantala was assistant coach for Vipers Kristiansand in the Norwegian REMA 1000-ligaen until the bankruptcy of the club.

== Career ==
During her career she played for Frederiksberg IF and Brabrand in Denmark, before moving to Norway in 1994 to join Toten HK. In 1996 she joined IK Junkeren, where she played for a single season before joining Larvik HK. Here so won 40 titles with the club over a 17-year period. In 2014 she retired at the age of 45 to become a goalkeeping coach at the club. In December 2024 she made a short comeback due to the injury of Larvik goalkeeper Alma Hasanić.

=== National team ===
She debuted on the Danish national team on 14 February 1991, and has since played 226 matches for Denmark. This makes her the 3rd most tenured player on the Danish Women's national team ever behind fellow goalkeeper Karin Mortensen and Janne Kolling. She also has the record for the oldest player on the Danish national team ever with 42 years and 307 days. She has won numerous medals with the team, notably including two Olympic gold medals at the 1996 Summer Olympics in Atlanta and at the 2000 Summer Olympics in Sydney.

== Personal life ==
Rantala is of Finnish descent through her paternal grandmother.
