= Jhennifer Lopes =

Brazilian handball player

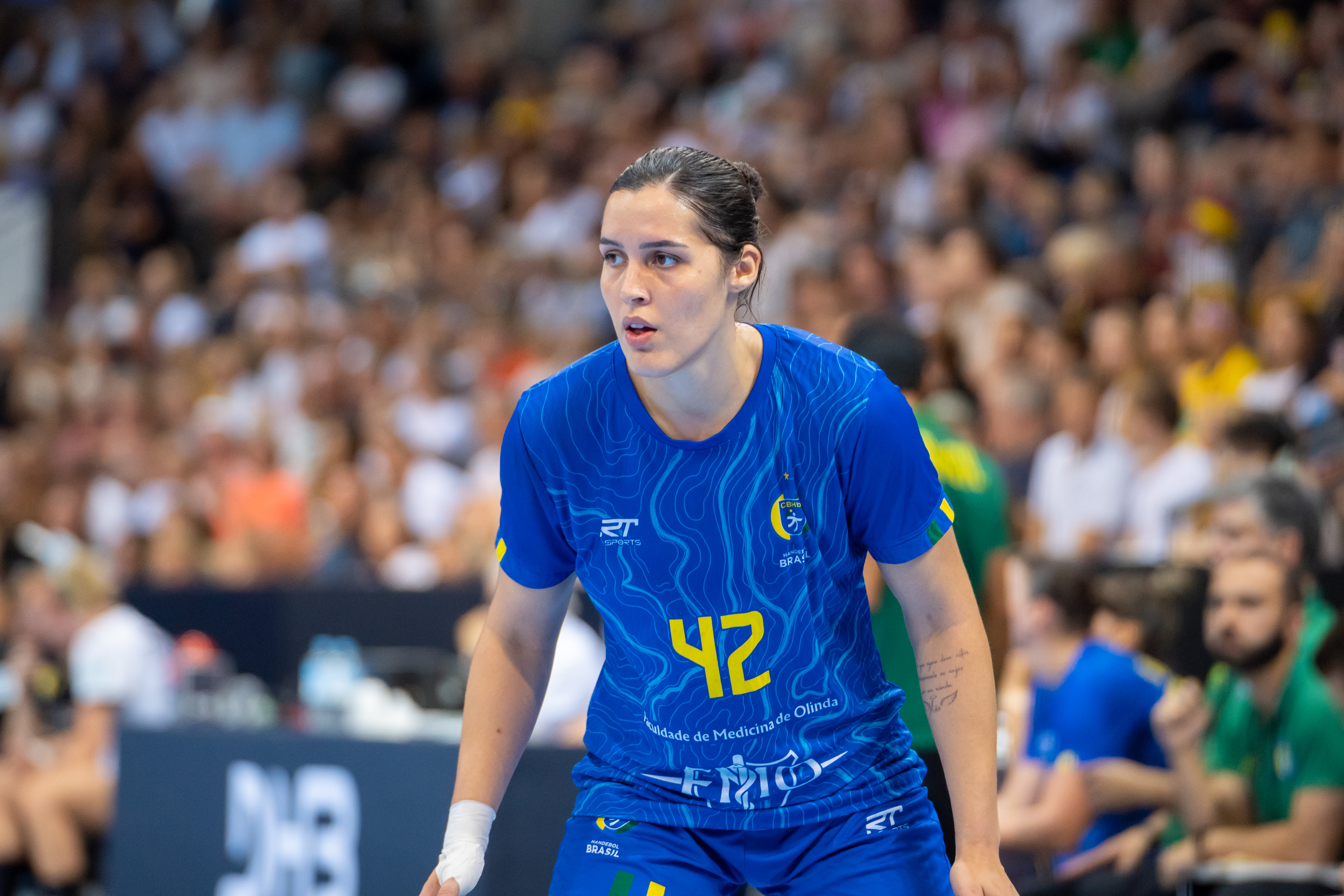

Personal information
- Nationality: Brazilian
- Born: 28 July 2000 (age 26) Rio de Janeiro, Brazil
- Height: 177 cm (70 in)

Sport
- Sport: Handball
- Position: Playmaker
- Current club: Rocasa Gran Canaria
- Number: 17

Senior clubs
- Years: Team
- 2018-2022: Ser Unimed Sorocaba
- 2022-2025: Rocasa Gran Canaria
- 2025-: Saint-Amand Handball
National team
| Years | Team | Apps | (Gls) |
| – | Brazil | 49 | (26) |
Medal record
South and Central American Championship
| Gold medal – first place | 2024 Brazil |
- Updated on 26 October 2025

Jhennifer Lopes (born 28 July 2000) is a Brazilian handballer, who plays for the Spanish team Rocasa Gran Canaria. She represented Brazil at the 2024 Summer Olympics.

She started playing for the Brazilian team Ser Unimed Sorocaba, where she came third in the league in 2022. In January 2023 joined Rocasa Gran Canaria. Here she reached the semifinal of the EHF European Cup in 2024.
