= 2026–27 Women's EHF Champions League knockout stage =

Handball tournament

The 2026–27 Women's EHF Champions League knockout stage is scheduled to begin on 20 March 2027 with the playoffs and end on 30 May 2027 with the final at the MVM Dome in Budapest, Hungary, to decide the winners of the 2026–27 Women's EHF Champions League. A total of twelve teams will compete in the knockout phase.

== Format ==
In the playoffs, the eight teams ranked 3rd–6th in Groups A and B play against each other in two-legged home-and-away matches. The four winning teams advance to the quarterfinals, where they are joined by the top-two teams of Groups A and B for another round of two-legged home-and-away matches. The four quarterfinal winners qualify for the final four tournament at the MVM Dome in Budapest, Hungary.

== Qualified teams ==
The top six teams from Groups A and B qualify for the knockout stage.

Group	Qualified for quarterfinals		Qualified for playoffs				
Group	First place	Second place	Third place	Fourth place	Fifth place	Sixth place	TBD
A							
B							

== Playoffs ==
The first legs of the playoff matches are scheduled for 20 and 21 March 2027, and the second legs for 27 and 28 March 2027.

=== Overview ===
Team 1	Agg.	Team 2	1st leg	2nd leg
B6	M1	A3	20–21 Mar	27–28 Mar
A6	M2	B3	20–21 Mar	27–28 Mar
B5	M3	A4	20–21 Mar	27–28 Mar
A5	M4	B4	20–21 Mar	27–28 Mar

==== Matches ====
20–21 March 2027	B6	v	A3

27–28 March 2027	A3	v	B6

20–21 March 2027	A6	v	B3

27–28 March 2027	B3	v	A6

20–21 March 2027	B5	v	A4

27–28 March 2027	A4	v	B5

20–21 March 2027	A5	v	B4

27–28 March 2027	B4	v	A5

== Quarter-finals ==
The first legs of the quarter-final matches are scheduled for 24 and 25 April 2027, and the second legs for 1 and 2 May 2027.

=== Overview ===
Team 1	Agg.	Team 2	1st leg	2nd leg
M4	–	A1	24–25 Apr	1–2 May
M3	–	B1	24–25 Apr	1–2 May
M2	–	A2	24–25 Apr	1–2 May
M1	–	B2	24–25 Apr	1–2 May

==== Matches ====
24–25 April 2027	M4	v	A1

1–2 May 2027	A1	v	M4

24–25 April 2027	M3	v	B1

1–2 May 2027	B1	v	A3

24–25 April 2027	M2	v	A2

1–2 May 2027	A2	v	M2

24–25 April 2027	M1	v	B2

1–2 May 2027	B2	v	M1

== Final four ==
The final four is scheduled to be held on 29 and 30 May 2027 at the MVM Dome in Budapest, Hungary.

=== Bracket ===
Semi-finals
29 May
29 May

Final
30 May
Third place
30 May

=== Semifinals ===
29 May 2027	TBD	v	TBD	MVM Dome, Budapest

29 May 2027	TBD	v	TBD	MVM Dome, Budapest

=== Third place game ===
30 May 2027	LSF1	v	LSF2	MVM Dome, Budapest

=== Final ===
30 May 2027	WSF1	v	WSF2	MVM Dome, Budapest
