= Martine Wolff =

Norwegian handball player (born 1996)

Personal information
- Nationality: Norwegian
- Born: 20 June 1996 (age 30) Oslo, Norway
- Height: 1.75 m (5 ft 9 in)

Sport
- Sport: Handball
- Position: Pivot
- Current club: Larvik HK
- Number: 8

Senior clubs
- Years: Team
- 2013–2016: Nordstrand IF
- 2016–2017: Glassverket IF
- 2017–2019: Larvik HK
- 2019–2025: Sola HK
- 2025–2026: Larvik HK
- 2026–: Saint-Amand Handball

Martine Wolff (born 20 June 1996) is a Norwegian female handball player who plays for Larvik HK.

== Achievements ==
- Norwegian League
  - Silver: 2024/2025
  - Bronze: 2020/2021, 2021/2022, 2022/2023, 2023/2024
- Norwegian Cup:
  - Finalist: 2020, 2022/2023, 2025
