= Larvik HK =

Norwegian handball club

- Full name: Larvik Håndballklubb
- Short name: Larvik
- Founded: 31 May 1990; 36 years ago
- Arena: Jotron Arena Larvik
- Capacity: 4,000
- President: Brede Csiszar
- Head coach: Petter Grønstad
- League: REMA 1000-ligaen
- 2025–26: 4th
- Club colours
Home	Away

Larvik Håndballklubb, is a professional women's handball club from Larvik, Norway.

The club has won 36 titles total in both the Norwegian League and the Norwegian Cup, and won the EHF Champions League in 2011.

== History ==
Larvik HK was founded in 1990 as a merger of the handball departments in the two clubs Larvik Turn and Halsen. They played in the top division since 1992/93. During their first year they were close to relegation, but managed to remain on top. They saw their breakthrough the following season, as they won the league title in 1994, and played the Norwegian Cup final.

From the late 1990s, Larvik was the strongest team on the Norwegian women's handball scene over a period of about twenty years, winning the league 19 times and the cup 17 times between 1994 and 2017. Last time they lost a league match at home was on 14 March 1999 before their first defeat in 18 years came against Vipers Kristiansand on 29 March 2017. On 14 May 2011, the club won the Women's EHF Champions League title for the first time.

On 14 May 2019, exactly 8 years after winning the Champions League, the club was degraded to 1. divisjon, after losing their elite license due to financial reasons. In the semifinal of the 2018-19 a group of players had refused to play, as they had not been paid, and the club was forced to use a youth team instead. In 2020 the club again qualified for REMA 1000-ligaen, the Top Division.

== Kits ==
AWAY

2014–15

== Results ==
=== Norway ===
Norwegian League

- Gold: 93/94, 96/97, 99/00, 00/01, 01/02, 02/03, 04/05, 05/06, 06/07, 07/08, 08/09, 09/10, 10/11, 11/12, 12/13, 13/14, 14/15, 15/16, 16/17
- Silver: 17/18
- Bronze: 95/96, 97/98, 03/04, 24/25

Norwegian Cup

- Gold: 95/96, 97/98, 99/00, 02/03, 03/04, 04/05, 2005, 2006, 2008, 2009, 2010, 2011, 2012, 2013, 2014, 2015, 2016
- Silver: 93/94, 96/97, 98/99, 2007, 2025
- Bronze: 23/24

=== Europe ===
EHF Champions League

- Gold: 10/11
- Silver: 12/13, 14/15

Cup Winners' Cup

- Gold: 04/05, 07/08
- Silver: 08/09

European Club Championship

- Bronze: 2008

== Team ==
=== Current squad ===
Squad for the 2026–27 season

Goalkeepers

- 12 (Norway) Dina Frisendal
- 16 (Norway) Lea Løkke-Øwre
- 30 (Norway) Sigrid Ellingsen
- 30 (Norway) Sanna Langmo Wold

Wingers
LW

- 7 (Norway) Sara Berg
- 21 (Iceland) Dana Björg Guðmundsdóttir

RW

- 4 (Norway) Charlotte Koffeld Iversen
- 15 (Norway) Guro Ramberg

Line players

- 18 (Norway) Tirill Solumsmoen Mørch
- 25 (Norway) Tiril Birgitte Rosenberg

Back players
LB

- 5 (Norway) Hannah Kjelstad Høsøien
- 6 (Norway) Amalie Gram
- 20 (Norway) Ingrid Vinjevoll
- 26 (Norway) Maja Furu Sæteren

CB

- 17 (Norway) Mari Myrland
- 22 (Norway) Andrea Rønning

RB

- 9 (Norway) Frida Haug Hoel
- 24 (Norway) Amanda Kurtović

=== Transfers ===
Transfers for the 2027–28 season

Joining

Leaving

- (Norway) Maja Furu Sæteren (LB) (to (Denmark) Nykøbing Falster)

=== Technical staff ===
- (Norway) Head coach: Petter Grønstad
- (Denmark) Assistant coach: Lene Rantala
- (Norway) Goalkeeping coach: Martin Reiersen
- (Norway) Physiotherapeut: Jørgen Eia Bringedal

=== Notable former national team players ===
- (Norway) Tine Albertsen (2004–2014)
- (Norway) Isabel Blanco
- (Norway) Monica Vik Hansen
- (Norway) Kristine Duvholt Havnås
- (Norway) Elisabeth Hilmo
- (Norway) Vigdis Hårsaker
- (Norway) Kari Mette Johansen (1998–2014)
- (Norway) Ida Bjørndalen Karlsson (2005–2007)
- (Norway) Tonje Larsen (1993–1998, 1999–2015)
- (Norway) Cecilie Leganger (2010–2014)
- (Norway) Heidi Løke (2000–2002, 2008–2011, 2022–2025)
- (Norway) Kristine Moldestad
- (Norway) Nora Mørk (2009–2016)
- (Norway) Katja Nyberg (1998–2005, 2010–2012)
- (Norway) Terese Pedersen
- (Norway) Cathrine Roll-Matthiesen
- (Norway) Lina Olsson Rosenberg
- (Norway) Mimi Kopperud Slevigen
- (Norway) Linn Jørum Sulland (2009–2015)
- (Norway) Birgitte Sættem (1998–2006)
- (Norway) Annette Tveter
- (Norway) Gro Hammerseng-Edin (2010–2017)
- (Norway) Anja Hammerseng-Edin (2012–2017)
- (Norway) Karoline Dyhre Breivang (2005–2017)
- (Norway) Amanda Kurtović (2011–2012, 2015–2017, 2022–)
- (Norway) Marit Malm Frafjord (2014–2017)
- (Norway) Sanna Solberg (2014–2017)
- (Norway) Thea Mørk (2010–2018)
- (Norway) Kristine Breistøl (2012–2018)
- (Norway) Linn-Kristin Riegelhuth Koren (2002–2009, 2010–2017)
- (Norway) Mari Molid (2014–2016, 2018–2019)
- (Norway) Emilie Christensen (2017–2019)
- (Norway) Tine Stange (2003–2023)
- (Norway) Olivia Lykke Nygaard (2026)
- (Norway) Julie Hulleberg (2024–2026)
- (Bulgaria) Polina Gencheva (2023–2024)
- (Denmark) Merete Møller
- (Denmark) Lene Rantala (1997–2014)
- (Denmark) Karen Brødsgaard (2004)
- (Denmark) Kristina Bille (2012–2014)
- (Denmark) Sandra Toft (2014–2017)
- (Brazil) Gabriela Moreschi (2016–2018)
- (Brazil) Tamires Morena Lima (2017–2018)
- (France) Raphaëlle Tervel (2009–2010)
- (Montenegro) Alma Hasanić Grizović (2013–2017, 2019–2022)
- (Poland) Alina Wojtas (2014–2017)
- (Sweden) Cassandra Tollbring (2017–2019)

=== Notable former club players ===
- (Norway) Inger Sofie Heieraas
- (Norway) Line Eftang
- (Norway) Vibeke Nesse
- (Norway) Cathrine Haakestad
- (Norway) Heidi Flaatnes
- (Norway) Lene Lillevik
- (Norway) Monica Meland
- (Norway) Sara Breistøl
- (Norway) Lise Løke
- (Norway) Vilde Johansen
- (Norway) Jenny Osnes Græsholt
- (Norway) Mari Finstad Bergum
- (Norway) Karoline Lund
- (Norway) Hege Løken
- (Norway) Martine Wolff
- (Norway) Maria Hjertner
- (Norway) Mathilde Rivas Toft
- (Norway) Marte Sirén Figenschau
- (Norway) June Andenæs
- (Norway) Guro Rundbråten
- (Norway) Tiril Merg
- (Norway) Tonje Berglie
- (Norway) Emma Skinnehaugen
- (Norway) Mie Rakstad
- (Norway) Dorthe Groa
- (Norway) Kaja Kristensen
- (Norway) Eli Smørgrav Skogstrand
- (Norway) Mina Hesselberg
- (Norway) Nora Rosenberg
- (Norway) Astrid Vasvik Løke
- (Norway) Mari Stensrud
- (Norway) Christine Neumann Strøm
- (Norway) Kine Kvalsund
- (Norway) Frøydis Seierstad
- (Norway) Martine Wolff
- (Bulgaria) Polina Gencheva
- (Denmark) Marianne Haugsted
- (Denmark) Christina Pedersen
- (Sweden) Yasminee Gluic
- (Sweden) Hanna Åhlén
- (Sweden) Elinore Johansson
- (Sweden) Esmeralda Fetahovic

=== Coaches ===
- (Norway) Peter Berthelsen (1 June 1990 – 1 June 1992)
- (Norway) Marit Breivik (1 June 1992 – 1 June 1994)
- (Norway) Gunnar Pettersen (1 June 1994 – 1 June 1996)
- (Iceland) Kristjan Halldórsson (1 June 1996 – 1 June 1998)
- (Norway) Ole Gustav Gjekstad (1 June 1998– 1 June 2005)
- (Norway) Karl-Erik Bøhn (1 June 2005 – 3 January 2011)
- (Norway) Ole Gustav Gjekstad (1 June 2011 – 1 June 2015)
- (Norway) Tor Odvar Moen (1 June 2015 – 1 June 2018)
- (Norway) Geir Oustorp (1 June 2018 – 5 February 2019)
- (Denmark) Lene Rantala (5 February 2019 – 1 June 2019)
- (Norway) Lars Wallin Andresen (1 June 2019 – 1 September 2020)
- (Norway) Are Ruud (September 1 September 2020 – 1 June 2021)
- (Norway) Eirik Haugdal (1 June 2021 – 1 June 2023)
- (Norway) Arne Senstad (1 June 2023 – 26 June 2025)
- (Sweden) Henrik Signell (8 August 2025 – 1 June 2026)
- (Norway) Petter Grønstad (1 June 2026 – )

== Stadium ==
- Name: Jotron Arena Larvik
- City: Larvik
- Capacity: 4,000 seats
- Opened: 19 September 2009
- Address: Hoffsgt. 6, 3262 Larvik

== Statistics ==
=== Top scorers in the EHF European League ===
Last updated on 15 November 2026

Rank	Name	Seasons played	Goals
1	(Norway) Maja Furu Sæteren	4	160
2	(Norway) Guro Ramberg	4	90
3	(Norway) Sara Berg	3	79
4	(Norway) Tirill Mørch	4	59
5	(Norway) Amanda Kurtović	3	49
6	(Norway) Julie Hulleberg	2	31
7	(Norway) Frøydis Seierstad	1	24
8	(Denmark) Christina Pedersen	1	22
9	(Norway) Tiril Rosenberg	3	21
9	(Norway) Charlotte Koffeld Iversen	4	21

== European record ==
Season	Competition	Round	Club	1st leg	2nd leg	Aggregate		
1994-95	EHF Champions League	Round of 16	(Israel) Hapoel Rishon Le Zion	34–7	39–9	73–16		
1994-95	EHF Champions League	Round of 8	(Turkey) Kültür Spor Ankara	24–21	31–11	55–32		
1994-95	EHF Champions League	Group A	(Austria) Hypo Niederösterreich	16–26	26–23	3rd place		
1994-95	EHF Champions League	Group A	(Spain) Mar Valencia	23–24	26–26	3rd place		
1994-95	EHF Champions League	Group A	(Slovenia) Belinka Olimp. Ljubljana	27–24	26–18	3rd place		
1995-96	EHF Cup	1/8	(Socialist Federal Republic of Yugoslavia) Radnicki Beograd	23–18	27–19	50–37		
1995-96	EHF Cup	1/4	(France) St.Francais Issy les Moulineaux	25–18	20–25	45–43		
1995-96	EHF Cup	1/2	(Spain) Valencia Urbana	19–26	26–17	45–43		
1995-96	EHF Cup	F	(Hungary) Debreceni VSC	23–20	15–18	38–38		
1996-97	EHF Cup Winners' Cup	Round of 16	(Poland) GKS Piotrkovia	29–16	33–25	62–41		
1996-97	EHF Cup Winners' Cup	1/8	Austria Tabak	34–12	32–10	66–22		
1996-97	EHF Cup Winners' Cup	1/4	(Spain) Corteblanco Bidebieta	30–17	22–22	52–39		
1996-97	EHF Cup Winners' Cup	1/2	(Russia) Istochnik Rostov	33–30	25–28	58–58 (a)		
1997-98	EHF Champions League	QR	(Switzerland) LC Brühl St. Gallen	30–25	32–21	62–46		
1997-98	EHF Champions League	Group C	(Montenegro) Buducnost Podgorica	26–27	32–29	3rd place		
1997-98	EHF Champions League	Group C	(North Macedonia) Kometal Dj.P. Skopje	29–30	22–26	3rd place		
1997-98	EHF Champions League	Group C	(Spain) A.D. Amadeo Tortajada	30–18	26–20	3rd place		
1998-99	EHF Cup Winners' Cup	Round of 16	(North Macedonia) "Struzanka" Struga	38–12	37–10	75–22		
1998-99	EHF Cup Winners' Cup	1/8	(Hungary) HERZ - FTC Budapest	33–23	24–33	57–56		
1998-99	EHF Cup Winners' Cup	1/4	(Norway) Baekkelagets Oslo	19–32	23–22	42–54		
1999-00	EHF Cup Winners' Cup	1/8	(Ukraine) Spartak Kyiv	36–24	14–28	50–52		
2000-01	EHF Champions League	Group C	(Romania) Oltchim Valcea	24–19	22–16	2nd place		
2000-01	EHF Champions League	Group C	(Greece) GAS Anagennisi Artas	29–21	30–22	2nd place		
2000-01	EHF Champions League	Group C	(Denmark) Viborg HK A/S	22–27	25–27	2nd place		
2000-01	EHF Champions League	Round of 16	(Slovenia) RK Krim Neutro Roberts	24–20	17–29	41–49		
2001-02	EHF Champions League	Group A	(Romania) A.S. Silcotub Zalau	29-29	31-27	1st place		
2001-02	EHF Champions League	Group A	(France) E.S.B.F. Besancon	31-27	18-27	1st place		
2001-02	EHF Champions League	Group A	(Ukraine) Motor Zaporoshje	24-18	27-26	1st place		
2001-02	EHF Champions League	1/4	(Spain) Milar L'Eliana Valencia	25–24	27–25	52–49		
2001-02	EHF Champions League	1/2	(North Macedonia) Kometal D. P. Skopje	29–22	21–28	50–50 (a)		
2002-03	EHF Champions League	Group C	(Poland) MKS POL-SKONE Lublin	20-20	27-19	2nd place		
2002-03	EHF Champions League	Group C	(Denmark) Ikast Bording EH	31-32	21-28	2nd place		
2002-03	EHF Champions League	Group C	(Austria) Hypo Niederösterreich	37-21	33-22	2nd place		
2002-03	EHF Champions League	1/4	(Spain) Milar L'Eliana Valencia	25–24	27–25	52–49		
2002-03	EHF Champions League	1/2	(Slovenia) Krim ETA N. Roberts Ljubljana	22–21	25–30	47–51		
2003-04	EHF Champions League	Group D	(Poland) KS BYSTRZYCA Lublin	32-25	33-26	1st place		
2003-04	EHF Champions League	Group D	(Hungary) FTC Budapest	29-22	26-29	1st place		
2003-04	EHF Champions League	Group D	(Spain) Alsa Elda Prestigio	38-23	25-25	1st place		
2003-04	EHF Champions League	1/4	(North Macedonia) Kometal D. P. Skopje	22–25	33–27	55–52		
2003-04	EHF Champions League	1/2	Krim Ljubljana Slovenia	30–33	19–27	49–60		
2004-05	EHF Cup Winners' Cup	Round 2	(Bulgaria) Etar Veliko 64 Tarnovo	47–11	50–13	97–24		
2004-05	EHF Cup Winners' Cup	Round 3	(France) E.S.B.F. Besancon	26–23	30–22	56–45		
2004-05	EHF Cup Winners' Cup	Round 4	(Denmark) FCK Handbold Kopenhagen	32–26	29–24	61–50		
2004-05	EHF Cup Winners' Cup	1/4	(Russia) Dinamo AQUA Volgograd	27–28	36–29	63–57		
2004-05	EHF Cup Winners' Cup	1/2	(Norway) Tertnes Bergen	32–24	31–20	63–44		
2004-05	EHF Cup Winners' Cup	1/4	(Croatia) Podravka Vegeta, Koprivnica	31–26	37–27	68–53		
2005-06	EHF Champions League	Group A	(Spain) Orsan Elda Prestigio	28-27	27-19	3rd place		
2005-06	EHF Champions League	Group A	(Denmark) Viborg HK A/S	23-31	27-30	3rd place		
2005-06	EHF Champions League	Group A	Krim Ljubljana Slovenia	29-23	19-24	3rd place		
2005-06	EHF Cup Winners' Cup	1/4	(Spain) S.D. Itxako Estella	18–17	31–19	49–36		
2005-06	EHF Cup Winners' Cup	1/2	(Hungary) Györi ETO Kezilabda Club	28–33	23–22	51–55		
2006-07	EHF Champions League	Group C	(Germany) HC Leipzig	31-23	30-27	1st place		
2006-07	EHF Champions League	Group C	(Croatia) Podravka Vegeta, Koprivnica	36-28	32-27	1st place		
2006-07	EHF Champions League	Group C	(Denmark) Viborg HK A/S	31-19	31-32	1st place		
2006-07	EHF Champions League	1/4	(Hungary) Györi Audi ETO KC	22–28	23–27	45–55		
2007-08	EHF Champions League	Group C	(North Macedonia) HC Kometal Gjorce Petrov	27-24	25-27	3rd place		
2007-08	EHF Champions League	Group C	(Austria) Hypo Niederösterreich	27-31	33-34	3rd place		
2007-08	EHF Champions League	Group C	(Russia) HC "Lada Togliatti"	25-35	29-28	3rd place		
2007-08	EHF Cup Winners' Cup	1/8	(Bosnia and Herzegovina) HRK "Katarina" Mostar	44–14	38–17	44–18		
2007-08	EHF Cup Winners' Cup	1/4	(France) Havre HAC	33–25	28–21	61–46		
2007-08	EHF Cup Winners' Cup	1/2	(Croatia) HC Podravka Vegeta	27–29	33–30	60–59		
2007-08	EHF Cup Winners' Cup	F	(Romania) C.S. Rulmentul-Urban Brasov	25–21	25–19	50–40		
2008	EHF Champions Trophy	FR	(Austria) Hypo Niederösterreich	31–35				
2008	EHF Champions Trophy	FR	(Russia) HC Dinamo	28–24				
2008-09	EHF Champions League	Group C	(Romania) C.S. Oltchim Rm. Valcea	29-33	25-27	3rd place		
2008-09	EHF Champions League	Group C	(Croatia) HC Podravka Vegeta	27-26	27-32	3rd place		
2008-09	EHF Champions League	Group C	(Russia) HC Lada	35-24	36-27	3rd place		
2008-09	EHF Cup Winners' Cup	1/8	(Denmark) KIF Vejen	25–21	26–22	51–43		
2008-09	EHF Cup Winners' Cup	1/4	(Romania) Otelul Galati	26–22	28–22	54–44		
2008-09	EHF Cup Winners' Cup	1/2	(Norway) Gjerpen Handball	37–23	37–20	74–43		
2008-09	EHF Cup Winners' Cup	F	(Denmark) FCK Handbold A/S	23–21	21–26	44–47		
2009-10	EHF Champions League	Group D	(Montenegro) Buducnost T-Mobile	27-23	29-22	1st place		
2009-10	EHF Champions League	Group D	(Denmark) FCK Handbold A/C	31-26	19-23	1st place		
2009-10	EHF Champions League	Group D	(Russia) HC Dinamo	18-17	23-26	1st place		
2009-10	EHF Champions League	Group 1	(Germany) HC Leipzig	23-20	31-21	1st place		
2009-10	EHF Champions League	Group 1	(Hungary) Györi AUDI ETO KC	29-27	23-28	1st place		
2009-10	EHF Champions League	Group 1	(Slovenia) RK Krim Mercator	34-30	30-23	1st place		
2009-10	EHF Champions League	1/2	(Denmark) Viborg HK	21–27	27–26	48–53		
2010-11	EHF Champions League	Group C	(France) Toulon Saint Cyr Var Handball	31-28	38-26	1st place		
2010-11	EHF Champions League	Group C	(Denmark) Randers HK	33-19	38-20	1st place		
2010-11	EHF Champions League	Group C	(Romania) C.S. "Oltchim" Rm. Valcea	34-31	28-33	1st place		
2010-11	EHF Champions League	Group 2	(Germany) HC Leipzig	26-24	29-19	2nd place		
2010-11	EHF Champions League	Group 2	(Russia) Dinamo	41-20	32-23	2nd place		
2010-11	EHF Champions League	Group 2	(Hungary) Györi AUDI ETO KC	16-25	24-18	2nd place		
2010-11	EHF Champions League	SF	(Montenegro) "Buducnost"	25–20	27–24	52–44		
2010-11	EHF Champions League	F	(Spain) Itxako Reyno De Navarra	23–21	24–25	47–46		
2011-12	EHF Champions League	Group B	(Denmark) Viborg HK	28-34	20-19	1st place		
2011-12	EHF Champions League	Group B	(Croatia) HC Podravka Vegata	37-25	24-21	1st place		
2011-12	EHF Champions League	Group B	(Slovenia) RK Krim Mercator	31-19	22-19	1st place		
2011-12	EHF Champions League	Group 1	(Denmark) FC Midtjylland	26-22	20-27	2nd place		
2011-12	EHF Champions League	Group 1	(Spain) Grupo Asfi Itxako Navarra	23-23	19-19	2nd place		
2011-12	EHF Champions League	Group 1	(Hungary) Györi AUDI ETO KC	22-31	32-25	2nd place		
2011-12	EHF Champions League	SF	(Montenegro) Buducnost	20–22	13–23	33–45		
2012-13	EHF Champions League	Group C	(Sweden) IK Sävehof	39-31	29-25	1st place		
2012-13	EHF Champions League	Group C	(Hungary) FTC Rail Cargo Hungaria	24-28	30-23	1st place		
2012-13	EHF Champions League	Group C	(Russia) Dinamo Volgograd	35-24	40-25	1st place		
2012-13	EHF Champions League	Group 1	(Denmark) Randers HK	25-19	31-26	2nd place		
2012-13	EHF Champions League	Group 1	(Montenegro) Buducnost	20-18	28-16	2nd place		
2012-13	EHF Champions League	Group 1	(Hungary) Györi Audi ETO KC	18-24	24-30	2nd place		
2012-13	EHF Champions League	SF	(Slovenia) RK Krim Mercator	22–24	27–19	49–43		
2012-13	EHF Champions League	F	(Hungary) Györi Audi ETO KC	21–24	22–23	43–47		
2013-14	EHF Champions League	Group D	(Croatia) HC Podravka Vegeta	34-18	24-19	2nd place		
2013-14	EHF Champions League	Group D	(North Macedonia) WHC Vardar SCBT	27-27	29-31	2nd place		
2013-14	EHF Champions League	Group D	(Spain) Balonmano Bera Bera	27-17	29-21	2nd place		
2013-14	EHF Champions League	Group 2	(Slovenia) RK Krim Mercator	18-24	28-22	3rd place		
2013-14	EHF Champions League	Group 2	(Hungary) Györi Audi ETO KC	23-29	29-31	3rd place		
2013-14	EHF Champions League	Group 2	(Montenegro) Buducnost	19-19	17-22	3rd place		
2014-15	EHF Champions League	Group D	(France) Metz Handball	25-20	26-25	1st place		
2014-15	EHF Champions League	Group D	(Poland) MKS Selgros Lublin	28-23	35-24	1st place		
2014-15	EHF Champions League	Group D	(Romania) HCM Baia Mare	24-23	31-26	1st place		
2014-15	EHF Champions League	Group 2	(Hungary) Györi Audi ETO KC	26-25	21-19	1st place		
2014-15	EHF Champions League	Group 2	(Denmark) Viborg HK A/S	31-18	29-23	1st place		
2014-15	EHF Champions League	Group 2	(Sweden) IK Sävehof	25-20	25-17	1st place		
2014-15	EHF Champions League	QF	(Germany) Thüringer HC	29–26	36–18	65–44		
2014-15	EHF Champions League	SF	(Russia) Dinamo-Sinara	31–22				
2014-15	EHF Champions League	F	(Montenegro) Buducnost	22–26				
2015-16	EHF Champions League	Group A	(Russia) Rostov-Don	21-27	25-26	2nd place		
2015-16	EHF Champions League	Group A	(Romania) HCM Baia Mare	31-29	27-22	2nd place		
2015-16	EHF Champions League	Group A	(Slovenia) RK Krim Mercator	37-21	32-28	2nd place		
2015-16	EHF Champions League	Group 1	(Germany) Thüringer HC	28-19	28-20	2nd place		
2015-16	EHF Champions League	Group 1	(Hungary) FTC Rail Cargo Hungaria	27-30	37-31	2nd place		
2015-16	EHF Champions League	Group 1	(France) Fleury Loiret Handball	26-31	31-28	2nd place		
2015-16	EHF Champions League	QF	(North Macedonia) HC Vardar	20–34	28–26	48–60		
2016-17	EHF Champions League	Group D	(Sweden) IK Sävehof	22-25	38-32	2nd place		
2016-17	EHF Champions League	Group D	(Slovenia) RK Krim Mercator	22-24	31-36	2nd place		
2016-17	EHF Champions League	Group D	(Denmark) Team Esbjerg	31-24	30-29	2nd place		
2016-17	EHF Champions League	Group 2	(Romania) CSM Bucuresti	26-26	35-33	2nd place		
2016-17	EHF Champions League	Group 2	(Denmark) FC Midtjylland	24-22	28-24	2nd place		
2016-17	EHF Champions League	Group 2	(Hungary) Györi Audi ETO KC	27-27	25-26	2nd place		
2016-17	EHF Champions League	QF	(Montenegro) Buducnost	17–31	30–35	47–66		
2017–18	EHF Champions League	Group C	(Germany) Thüringer HC	27-31	25-22	4th place		
2017–18	EHF Champions League	Group C	(Hungary) FTC-Rail Cargo Hungaria	33-37	21-30	4th place		
2017–18	EHF Champions League	Group C	(North Macedonia) HC Vardar	19-31	27-30	4th place		
2017–18	EHF Cup	Group D	(Romania) H.C. Zalau	28-23	22-25	1st place		
2017–18	EHF Cup	Group D	(Czech Republic) DHK Banik Most	21-21	34-29	1st place		
2017–18	EHF Cup	Group D	(Sweden) H 65 Höörs HK	27-25	34-23	1st place		
2017–18	EHF Cup	QF	(Denmark) Viborg HK	21–28	26–27	47–55		
2018-19	EHF Champions League	Group A	(Montenegro) ŽRK Budućnost	23-22	25-26	4th place		
2018-19	EHF Champions League	Group A	(France) Metz Handball	21-31	20-31	4th place		
2018-19	EHF Champions League	Group A	(Denmark) Odense Håndbold	25-33	23-27	4th place		
2018–19	EHF Cup	Group C	(Denmark) Viborg HK	28-31	23-26	4th place		
2018–19	EHF Cup	Group C	(Russia) Kuban	26-32	23-23	4th place		
2018–19	EHF Cup	Group C	(France) E.S Besancon Feminin	25-32	29-26	4th place		
2023–24	EHF European League	R2	(Spain) Costa del Sol Malaga	31–35	27–33	58–68		
2023–24	EHF European League	2024–25	EHF European League	R3	(Poland) KPR Gminy Kobierzyce	30–29	43–43 PS	73–72
2023–24	EHF European League	2024–25	EHF European League	Group Matches; Group A	(Romania) HC Dunărea Brăila	24–27	33–33	3rd place
2023–24	EHF European League	2024–25	EHF European League	Group Matches; Group A	(Germany) Thüringer HC	35–43	38–25	3rd place
(Spain) CB Elche	29–16	2024–25	EHF European League	Group Matches; Group A	30–23			3rd place
2025–26	EHF European League	R3	(Norway) Molde Elite	34–23	32–33	66–56		
2025–26	EHF European League	Group Matches; Group A	(Romania) CS Minaur Baia Mare	26–28	31–28	4th place		
2025–26	EHF European League	Group Matches; Group A	(Germany) Thüringer HC	33–36	28–34	4th place		
2025–26	EHF European League	Group Matches; Group A	(Hungary) Motherson Mosonmagyaróvár	22–31	26–27	4th place		
2026–27	EHF European League	R2	(France) OGC Nice Côte d'Azur	27–28	34–32	61–60		
2026–27	EHF European League	R3	(France) St Amand HB-Porte du Hainaut	25–25	31–24	56–49		
