= 1997–98 EHF Women's Champions League =

The 1997–98 EHF Women's Champions League was the fifth edition of the modern era of the 1961-founded competition for European national champions women's handball clubs, running from 4 October 1997 to 16 May 1998. Hypo Niederösterreich defeated defending champion Mar Valencia in the final to win its seventh title.

== Qualifying round ==
Team #1	Agg.	Team #2	1st	2nd
Madeira (Portugal)	32–74	(Poland) SPR Lublin	13–36	19–38
Viborg HK (Denmark)	56–48	(Lithuania) Egle Vilnius	30–22	26–26
Hapoel Petah Tikva (Israel)	31–95	(Croatia) Podravka Koprivnica	18–50	13–45
Giessen-Lützellinden (Germany)	35–47	(Ukraine) HC Motor Zaporizhzhia	25–20	10–27
Fémina Visé (Belgium)	34–70	(Romania) Oltchim Ramnicu Valcea	18–32	16–38
Budućnost Podgorica (Federal Republic of Yugoslavia)	66–58	(Czech Republic) HC Ostrava	34–26	32–32
Gjorce Petrov (North Macedonia)	77–48	(Slovakia) Slovan Duslo Sala	40–22	37–26
PF Rimini (Italy)	43–43	(Greece) Anagennisi Artas	22–18	21–25
Swift Roermond (Netherlands)	40–53	(Russia) Istochnik Rostov	21–25	19–28
Brühl (Switzerland)	46–62	(Norway) Larvik HK	25–30	21–32
Krim Ljubljana (Slovenia)	67–52	(Turkey) YKM Istanbul	33–27	34–25
Politechnik Minsk (Belarus)	41–53	(Spain) Amadeo Tortajada	24–32	17–21
ASPTT Metz (France)	71–29	(Bulgaria) Volan Sofia	36–15	35–14
Kefalovrysos Kythreas (Cyprus)	16–151	(Hungary) Ferencvárosi TC	7–69	9–82

== Group stage ==
=== Group A ===
Team	Pld	W	D	L	GF	GA	GDorg	Pts
(Croatia) Podravka Koprivnica	6	6	0	0	170	134	+36	12
(Ukraine) HC Motor Zaporizhzhia	6	2	1	3	127	142	−15	5
(Poland) SPR Lublin	6	2	0	4	156	163	−7	4
(Russia) Istochnik Rostov	6	1	1	4	135	149	−14	3

=== Group B ===
Team	Pld	W	D	L	GF	GA	GDorg	Pts
(Spain) Mar Valencia	6	6	0	0	189	138	+51	12
(Slovenia) Krim Ljubljana	6	3	0	3	162	170	−8	6
(Hungary) Ferencvárosi TC	6	1	1	4	147	159	−12	3
(France) ASPTT Metz	6	1	1	4	135	166	−31	3

=== Group C ===
Team	Pld	W	D	L	GF	GA	GDorg	Pts
(North Macedonia) Gjorce Petrov	6	5	0	1	178	149	+29	10
(Federal Republic of Yugoslavia) Budućnost Podgorica	6	4	0	2	172	169	+3	8
(Norway) Larvik HK	6	3	0	3	165	150	+15	6
(Spain) Amadeo Tortajada	6	0	0	6	131	178	−47	0

=== Group D ===
Team	Pld	W	D	L	GF	GA	GDorg	Pts
(Denmark) Viborg HK	6	4	0	2	141	121	+20	8
(Austria) Hypo NÖ	6	4	0	2	141	125	+16	8
(Romania) Oltchim Ramnicu Valcea	6	3	0	3	138	124	+14	6
(Italy) PF Rimini	6	1	0	5	121	171	−50	2

== Quarter-finals ==
Team #1	Agg.	Team #2	1st	2nd
Krim Ljubljana (Slovenia)	48–48	(Croatia) Podravka Koprivnica	28–23	20–25
Hypo NÖ (Austria)	40–33	(North Macedonia) Gjorce Petrov	26–12	14–21
Budućnost Podgorica (Federal Republic of Yugoslavia)	66–57	(Denmark) Viborg HK	39–30	27–27
HC Motor Zaporizhzhia (Ukraine)	47–65	(Spain) Mar Valencia	21–33	26–32

== Semifinals ==
Team #1	Agg.	Team #2	1st	2nd
Podravka Koprivnica (Croatia)	36–38	(Austria) Hypo NÖ	17–18	19–20
Budućnost Podgorica (Federal Republic of Yugoslavia)	54–79	(Spain) Mar Valencia	26–40	28–39

== Final ==
Team #1	Agg.	Team #2	09.05.1998	16.05.1998
Hypo NÖ (Austria)	56–47	(Spain) Mar Sagunto	28–21	28–26
