= Saint-Amand Handball =

French handball club

- Full name: Hand Ball Club Saint-Amand; HBC Saint-Amand Porte du Hainaut
- Founded: 1984
- Arena: Complexe Jean Verdavaine et Salle Maurice Hugot, Saint-Amand-les-Eaux
- President: Sophie Palisse
- Head coach: Edina Szabó
- League: French Women's First League
- 2022–23: 14th

Location of Saint Amand Handball

Saint-Amand Handball is the name of a French handball club from Saint-Amand-les-Eaux, France. This team currently competes in the French Women's Handball First League from 2020 and they play their home matches in Complexe Jean Verdavaine et Salle Maurice Hugot.

== Team ==
=== Current squad ===
Squad for the 2025–26 season.

Goalkeepers

- 16 (Senegal) Justicia Toubissa-Elbeco
- 84 (Brazil) Mayssa Pessoa

LW

- 5 (France) Masseita Guirassy
- 99 (France) Laugane Pina

RW

- 22 (France) Eva Giustiniani
- 10 (France) Julie Le Blévec

Line players

- 08 (Norway) Martine Wolff
- 19 (France) Sabrina Abdellahi
- 91 (France) Adja Ouattara

Back players
LB

- 28 (France) Laura Lasm
- 97 (France) Elisa Técher

CB

- 2 (France) Claire Koestner

RB

- 34 (France) Eva Mbata
- 46 (Cameroon) Paola Ebanga Baboga

=== Transfers ===
Transfers for the 2026–27 season

Joining

- (France) Laura Lasm (LB) (from (Romania) Corona Brasov)
- (Norway) Martine Wolff (P) (from (Norway) Larvik HK)
- (Senegal) Justicia Toubissa-Elbeco (GK) (from (France) Sambre-Avesnois)
- (France) Eva Giustiniani (RB) (from (France) Toulon Métropole Var Handball)

Leaving

- (Brazil) Jhennifer Lopes (LB) (to (Poland) MKS Lublin)
- (Brazil) Marcela Arounian (P) (to (Germany) Thüringer HC)
- (France) Ophelie Tonds (GK) (to (France) ESBF Besançon)
