= Julie Hulleberg =

Norwegian handball player (born 2001)

Personal information
- Nationality: Norwegian
- Born: 15 June 2001 (age 25) Råde, Norway
- Height: 1.70 m (5 ft 7 in)

Sport
- Sport: Handball
- Position: Left back
- Current club: Larvik HK
- Number: 10

Youth career
- Years: Team
- 2006–2017: Råde IL

Senior clubs
- Years: Team
- 2017–2024: Fredrikstad BK
- 2024–2026: Larvik HK
- 2026–: Rapid București
National team
Years	Team	Apps	(Gls)
2023–	Norway	6	(3)

Julie Hulleberg (born 15 June 2001) is a Norwegian handball player for Larvik HK.

As a child, Hulleberg was a multitalent and became a Norwegian champion in Slowdance and was also a talented soccer player.

In 2025, she was selected to represent Norway at the Golden League in March.

== Achievements ==
- REMA 1000-ligaen:
  - Bronze: 2024/2025
- Norwegian Cup:
  - Finalist: 2025
