= Alma Hasanić Grizović =

Bosnian-Norwegian handball player (born 1989)

Alma Hasanić
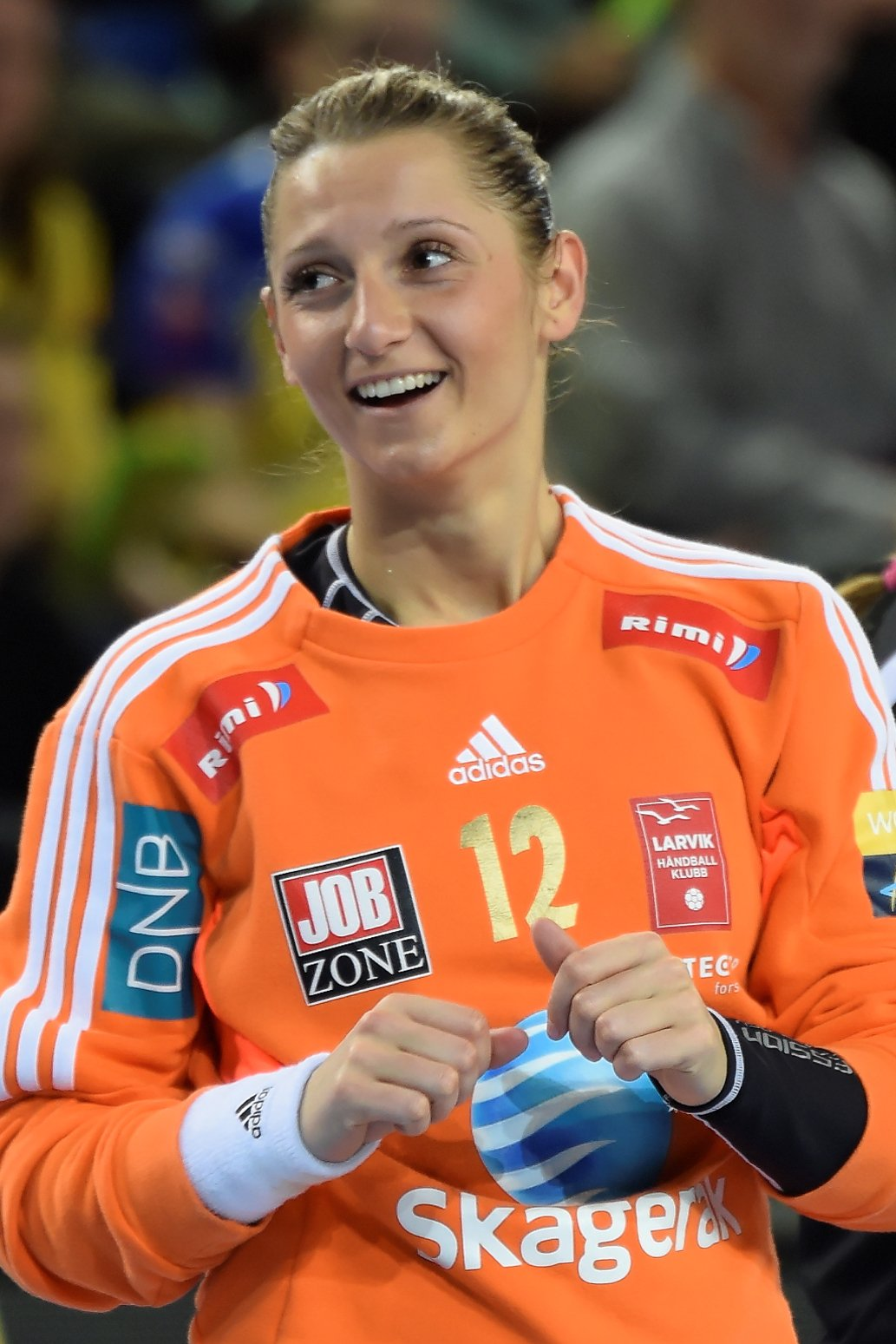

Personal information
- Nationality: Bosnian; Norwegian; Montenegrin
- Born: 13 May 1989 (age 37) Tešanj, SR Bosnia and Herzegovina, SFR Yugoslavia
- Height: 1.79 m (5 ft 10 in)

Sport
- Sport: Handball
- Position: Goalkeeper
- Current club: Larvik HK
- Number: 29

Senior clubs
- Years: Team
- 2005–2009: Nordstrand IF
- 2009–2010: Njård IL
- 2010–2011: Nordstrand IF
- 2011–2013: Glassverket IF
- 2013–2017: Larvik HK
- 2017–2019: Storhamar HE
- 2019–2022: Larvik HK
National team
Years	Team	Apps	(Gls)
2014	Norway	1	(0)
2015–	Montenegro	16	(0)

Alma Hasanić Grizović (born 13 May 1989) is a Bosnian-Norwegian retired handball player.

Grizović was born in Tešanj, SR Bosnia and Herzegovina to Bosnian parents, and was raised in Norway. She made her debut on Norway women's national handball team on 8 June 2014, against South Korea. Because the goalkeeper competition was hard on the Norwegian team, she decided to try out for Montenegrin national team, as she had family who was Montenegrin.

She competed for Montenegro at the 2015 World Women's Handball Championship in Denmark, finishing 8th.

== Achievements ==
- Norwegian Championship:
  - Winner: 2013/14, 2014/15, 2015/16, 2016/17
- Norwegian Cup:
  - Winner: 2013/14, 2014/15, 2015/16
