= Lånlet Arena =

Indoor sports arena in Nykøbing Falster, Denmark

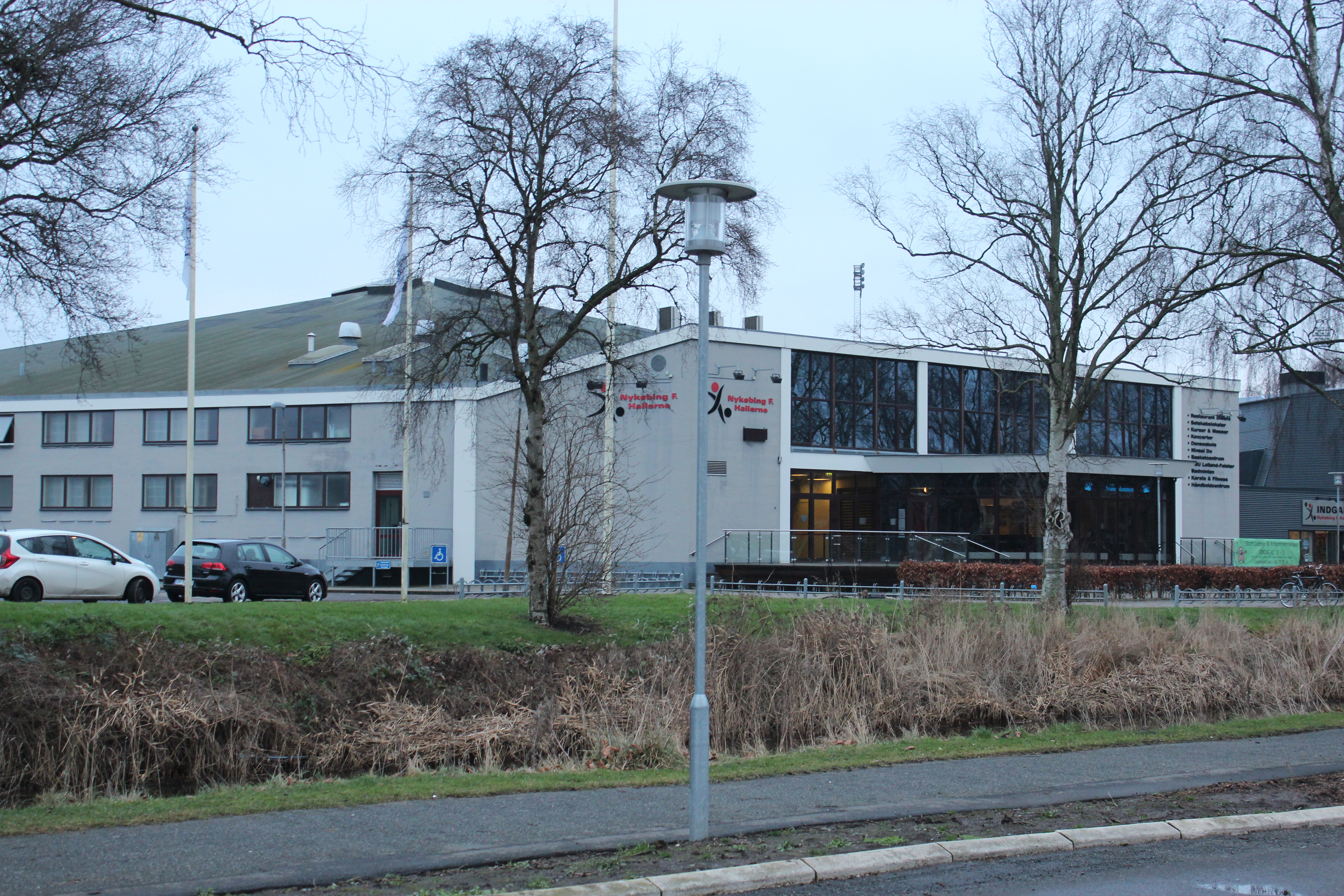
Nykøbing F. Hallen

Lånlet Arena (previously known as Pricerunner Arena, Scandlines Arena and POWER ARENA for sponsorship reasons), also known as Nykøbing F. Hallen, is an indoor sports arena in Nykøbing Falster, Denmark primarily used for handball. It holds 1.300 spectators and is home arena to Nykøbing Falster Håndboldklub. Until June 2017, it was called Scandlines Arena but the name was changed ahead of the 2017-18 season.
