= Tonje Berglie =

Norwegian handballer (born 1992)

Personal information
- Full name: Tonje Cecilie Roth Berglie
- Nationality: Norwegian
- Born: 11 August 1992 (age 34) Tønsberg, Norway
- Height: 1.68 m (5 ft 6 in)

Sport
- Sport: Handball
- Position: Left wing
- Current club: Larvik HK
- Number: 21

Senior clubs
- Years: Team
- 2008–2009: Halsen IF
- 2009–2011: Larvik HK recruit
- 2011–2013: Bækkelagets SK
- 2013–2016: Nordstrand IF
- 2016–2017: Aker Topphåndball
- 2017–: Larvik HK

Tonje Roth Berglie (born 11 August 1992) is a Norwegian female handballer who plays for Larvik HK.

== Personal life ==
Berglie studies to become a psychologist.
