= Christina Pedersen (handballer, born 2001) =

Danish handball player (born 2001)

Personal information
- Full name: Christina Pedersen
- Nationality: Danish
- Born: 26 March 2001 (age 25) Vester Hassing, Denmark
- Height: 1.73 m (5 ft 8 in)

Sport
- Sport: Handball
- Position: Centre back
- Current club: Larvik HK
- Number: 66

Youth career
- Years: Team
- 2016–2018: Hjallerup IF
- 2018-2019: Skanderborg Håndbold

Senior clubs
- Years: Team
- 2018–2021: Vendsyssel Håndbold
- 2021–2022: HH Elite
- 2022: Randers HK
- 2022–2025: Viborg HK
- 2025–2026: Larvik HK
- 2026–: Storhamar HE

Christina Pedersen (born 26 March 2001) is a Danish handball player for Norwegian Larvik HK, having previously played for Vendsyssel Håndbold, HH Elite, Randers HK and Viborg HK.

On 22 August 2025, it was announced that Pedersen had been released from her contract with Viborg HK. On 24 August, she had signed a two-year contract with Larvik HK in REMA 1000-ligaen, which marked her first transfer abroad. In December 2024, she was part of the extended squad of the Danish national team at the 2024 European Women's Handball Championship, despite none international appearances.

== Achievements ==
- Norwegian Cup:
  - Finalist: 2025
