= Katarina Pandza =

Austrian handballer (born 2002)

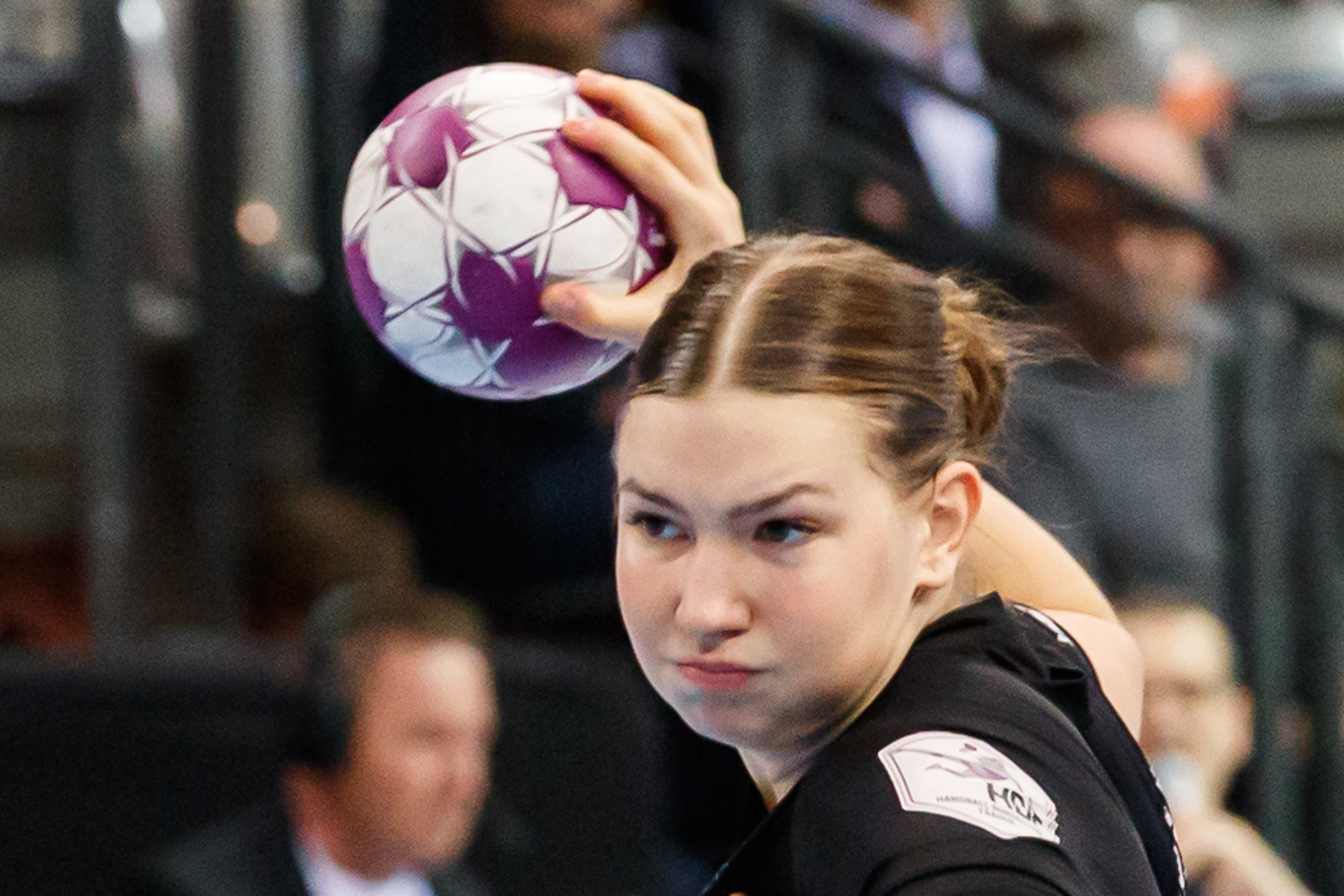

Personal information
- Nationality: Austrian
- Born: 17 April 2002 (age 24) Mödling, Austria
- Height: 1.76 m (5 ft 9 in)

Sport
- Sport: Handball
- Position: Left back
- Current club: RK Podravka Koprivnica
- Number: 27

Senior clubs
- Years: Team
- 2018–2019: Hypo Niederösterreich
- 2019–2023: TuS Metzingen
- 2019–2020: → TG Nürtingen (on loan)
- 2023–2027: RK Podravka Koprivnica
- 2027–: CS Rapid București
National team
| Years | Team | Apps | (Gls) |
| 2019– | Austria | 53 | (221) |
- Updated on 6 November 2025

Katarina Pandza (Croatian: Pandža; born 17 April 2002) is an Austrian handballer for RK Podravka Koprivnica and the Austrian national team.

She represented Austria at the 2021 World Women's Handball Championship, placing 16th.

Her sister Ana Pandza is also a handballer for RK Podravka Koprivnica and the Austrian national team.
