= Mia Svele =

Norwegian handball player (born 2001)

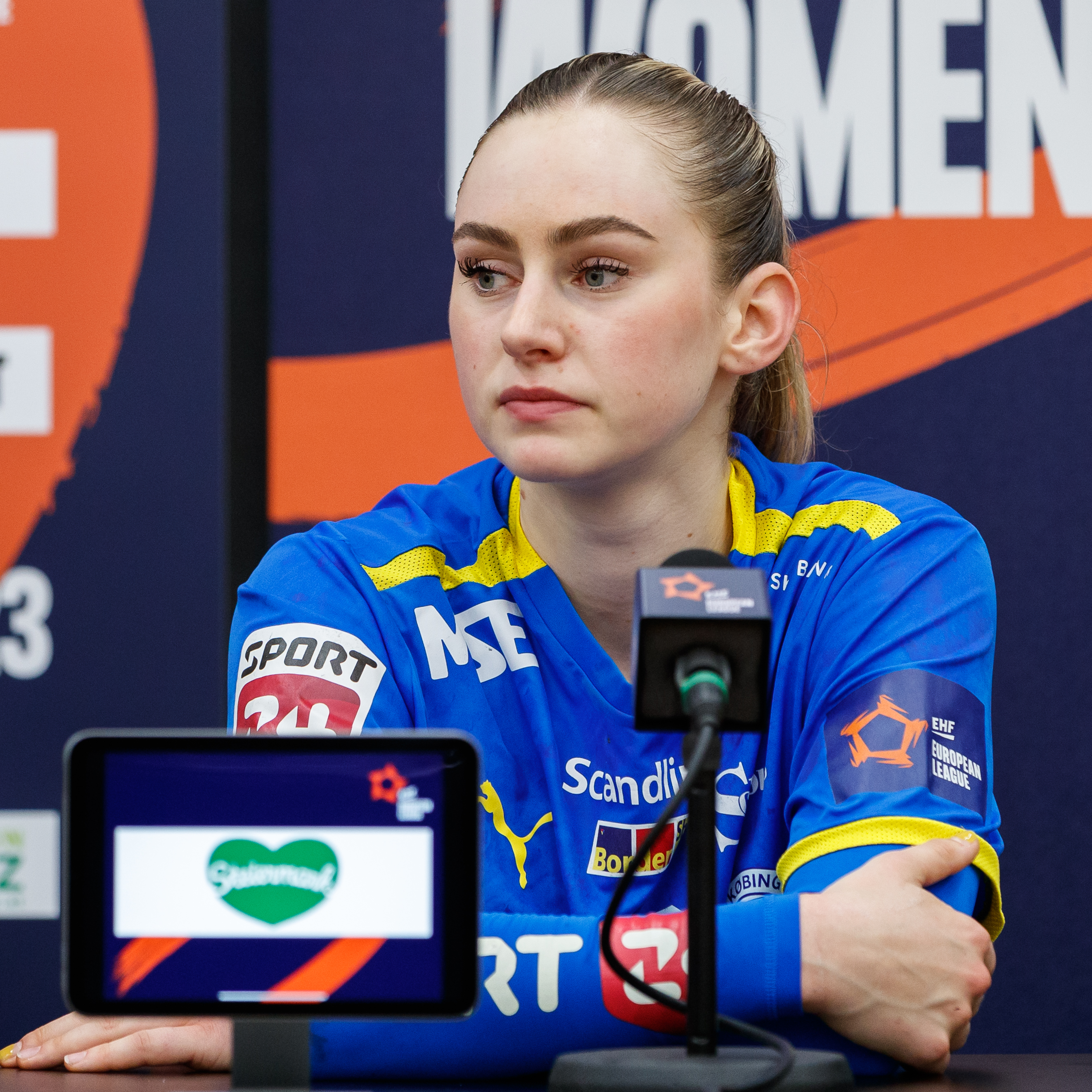

Personal information
- Full name: Mia Solberg Svele
- Nationality: Norwegian
- Born: 16 April 2001 (age 25) Ringsaker, Hedmark
- Height: 1.74 m (5 ft 9 in)

Sport
- Sport: Handball
- Position: Centre back
- Current club: Nykøbing Falster
- Number: 10

Youth career
- Years: Team
- –2017: Storhamar IL

Senior clubs
- Years: Team
- 2017–2020: Storhamar HE
- 2020–2023: Nykøbing Falster
- 2023–2025: Storhamar HE
- 2025–2027: Nykøbing Falster
- 2027–: Odense Håndbold
National team
Years	Team	Apps	(Gls)
2026–	Norway	1	(1)
Medal record
Youth European Championship
Silver medal – second place	2017 Slovakia

Mia Svele (born 16 April 2001) is a Norwegian handball player for Nykøbing Falster.

She is a daughter of former handballer and handball commentator Bent Svele.

She also participated at the 2018 Women's Youth World Handball Championship, placing 11th.

== Achievements ==
- EHF European League:
  - Winner: 2023/2024
  - Silver Medalist: 2022/2023
- Norwegian League
  - Gold Medalist: 2024/2025
  - Silver Medalist: 2018/2019, 2019/2020, 2023/2024
  - Bronze Medalist: 2017/2018
- Norwegian Cup:
  - Winner: 2024
  - Finalist: 2018, 2019, 2023/2024
