= Norway at the 2012 Summer Olympics =

- IOC code: NOR
- NOC: Norwegian Olympic Committee and Confederation of Sports
- Website: www.idrett.no (in Norwegian)

in London
- Competitors: 66 in 14 sports
- Flag bearers: Mira Verås Larsen (opening); Eirik Verås Larsen (closing)
- Medals Ranked 34th: Gold 2 Silver 1 Bronze 1 Total 4

Summer Olympics appearances (overview)
- 1900; 1904; 1908; 1912; 1920; 1924; 1928; 1932; 1936; 1948; 1952; 1956; 1960; 1964; 1968; 1972; 1976; 1980; 1984; 1988; 1992; 1996; 2000; 2004; 2008; 2012; 2016; 2020; 2024

Other related appearances
- 1906 Intercalated Games

Norway competed at the 2012 Summer Olympics in London, from 27 July to 12 August 2012. This was the nation's twenty-fourth appearance at the Summer Olympics; Norway did not take part in the 1904 Summer Olympics in St. Louis and the 1980 Summer Olympics in Moscow, due to the country's support for the United States boycott. The Norwegian Olympic and Paralympic Committee and Confederation of Sports sent a total of 66 athletes to the Games, 34 men and 32 women, to compete in 14 sports. Women's handball was the only team-based sport in which Norway was represented in these Olympic games. There was only a single competitor in badminton, mountain biking, diving, equestrian dressage, fencing and wrestling.

The Norwegian team featured past Olympic champions, three of them defending (javelin thrower Andreas Thorkildsen, single sculls rower Olaf Tufte, who competed at his fifth Olympics, and the women's national handball team, led by Gøril Snorroeggen). Archer Bård Nesteng made his Olympic comeback in London after a twelve-year absence. Other notable Norwegian athletes featured Gambian-born sprinter Jaysuma Saidy Ndure, who finished fourth in the world championships, breaststroke swimmer Sara Nordenstam, who previously won bronze in Beijing, and sprint kayaker Mira Verås Larsen, who was the nation's flag bearer at the opening ceremony.

Norway left London with a total of 4 medals (2 gold, 1 silver, and 1 bronze), the lowest haul since Los Angeles. Among the nation's medalists were Eirik Verås Larsen, who recaptured his gold medal from Athens in men's sprint kayaking, and Bartosz Piasecki, who won Norway's first ever Olympic medal in fencing. The women's national handball team managed to defend its Olympic title from Beijing, after beating Montenegro in the final. Several Norwegian athletes, however, narrowly missed out of the medal standings, including defending champions Thorklidsen and Tufte, and middle-distance runner Henrik Ingebrigtsen.

== Medalists ==
Medal	Name	Sport	Event	Date
Gold	Norway women's national handball team: Kari Aalvik Grimsbø; Ida Alstad; Heidi Løke; Tonje Nøstvold; Karoline Dyhre Breivang; Kristine Lunde-Borgersen; Kari Mette Johansen; Marit Malm Frafjord; Linn Jørum Sulland; Katrine Lunde Haraldsen; Linn-Kristin Riegelhuth Koren; Gøril Snorroeggen; Amanda Kurtović; Camilla Herrem; (Karoline Næss)	Handball	Women's tournament	11 August
Gold	Eirik Verås Larsen	Canoeing	Men's K-1 1000 m	8 August
Silver	Bartosz Piasecki	Fencing	Men's individual épée	1 August
Bronze	Alexander Kristoff	Cycling	Men's road race	28 July

== Archery ==
Norway has qualified one archer for the men's individual event.

Athlete	Event	Ranking round		Round of 64	Round of 32	Round of 16	Quarterfinals	Semifinals	Final / BM	
Athlete	Event	Score	Seed	Opposition Score	Opposition Score	Opposition Score	Opposition Score	Opposition Score	Opposition Score	Rank
Bård Nesteng	Men's individual	669	21	Kikuchi (JPN) (44); W 6–5	Wukie (USA) (12); W 6–2	Furukawa (JPN) (5); L 2–6	Did not advance			

== Athletics ==
Key

- Note–Ranks given for track events are within the athlete's heat only
- Q = Qualified for the next round
- q = Qualified for the next round as a fastest loser or, in field events, by position without achieving the qualifying target
- NR = National record
- N/A = Round not applicable for the event
- Bye = Athlete not required to compete in round

Men
Track & road events

Athlete	Event	Heat		Quarterfinal		Semifinal		Final	
Athlete	Event	Result	Rank	Result	Rank	Result	Rank	Result	Rank
Urige Buta	Marathon	—N/a						2:17:58	36
Henrik Ingebrigtsen	1500 m	3:41.33	4 Q	—N/a		3:43.26	5 Q	3:35.43 NR	5
Jaysuma Saidy Ndure	100 m	Bye		10.28	4	Did not advance			
Jaysuma Saidy Ndure	200 m	20.52	3 Q	—N/a		20.42	4	Did not advance	
Trond Nymark	50 km walk	—N/a						3:48:37	21
Erik Tysse	20 km walk	—N/a						1:21:00	14

Field events

Athlete	Event	Qualification		Final	
Athlete	Event	Distance	Position	Distance	Position
Eivind Henriksen	Hammer throw	74.62	13	Did not advance	
Andreas Thorkildsen	Javelin throw	84.47	2 Q	82.63	6

Women
Track & road events

Athlete	Event	Heat		Quarterfinal		Semifinal		Final	
Athlete	Event	Result	Rank	Result	Rank	Result	Rank	Result	Rank
Ingvill Måkestad Bovim	1500 m	DNS		—N/a		Did not advance			
Karoline Bjerkeli Grøvdal	5000 m	15:24.86	13	—N/a				Did not advance	
Ezinne Okparaebo	100 m	Bye		11.14	4 q	11.10 NR	4	Did not advance	
Ezinne Okparaebo	200 m	23.30 =NR	5	—N/a		Did not advance			
Christina Vukicevic	100 m hurdles	Withdrew due to bad form							

Field events

Athlete	Event	Qualification		Final	
Athlete	Event	Distance	Position	Distance	Position
Tonje Angelsen	High jump	1.85	28	Did not advance	
Margrethe Renstrøm	Long jump	DNS		Did not advance	

Combined events – Heptathlon

Athlete	Event	100H	HJ	SP	200 m	LJ	JT	800 m	Final	Rank
Ida Marcussen	Result	14.08	1.68	14.26	25.15	5.82	42.26	2:13.62	5846	28
Ida Marcussen	Points	967	830	811	873	795	711	912	5846	28

== Badminton ==
Athlete	Event	Group stage			Elimination	Quarterfinal	Semifinal	Final / BM	
Athlete	Event	Opposition Score	Opposition Score	Rank	Opposition Score	Opposition Score	Opposition Score	Opposition Score	Rank
Sara Blengsli Kværnø	Women's singles	Sung Ji-h (KOR); L 8–21, 5–21	Yip P Y (HKG); L 8–21, 7–21	3	Did not advance				

== Canoeing ==
=== Sprint ===
Norway qualified boats for the following events:

Athlete	Event	Heats		Semifinals		Final	
Athlete	Event	Time	Rank	Time	Rank	Time	Rank
Eirik Verås Larsen	Men's K-1 1000 m	3:31.288	3 Q	3:29.547	2 FA	3:26.462	1st place, gold medalist(s)
Mira Verås Larsen	Women's K-1 500 m	1:55.923	5 Q	1:57.354	6	Did not advance	

Qualification Legend: FA = Qualify to final (medal); FB = Qualify to final B (non-medal)

== Cycling ==
=== Road ===
Athlete	Event	Time	Rank
Edvald Boasson Hagen	Men's road race	Did not finish	
Edvald Boasson Hagen	Men's time trial	54:30.87	13
Alexander Kristoff	Men's road race	5:46:05	3rd place, bronze medalist(s)
Vegard Stake Laengen	Men's road race	5:46:37	77
Lars Petter Nordhaug	Men's road race	5:46:05	25
Emilie Moberg	Women's road race	OTL	

=== Mountain biking ===
Athlete	Event	Time	Rank
Gunn-Rita Dahle Flesjå	Women's cross-country	Did not finish	

== Diving ==
Men

Athlete	Event	Preliminaries		Semifinals		Final	
Athlete	Event	Points	Rank	Points	Rank	Points	Rank
Amund Gismervik	10 m platform	401.55	24	Did not advance			

== Equestrian ==
=== Dressage ===
Athlete	Horse	Event	Grand Prix		Grand Prix Special		Grand Prix Freestyle		Overall	
Athlete	Horse	Event	Score	Rank	Score	Rank	Technical	Artistic	Score	Rank
Siril Helljesen	Dorina	Individual	69.985	31	Did not advance					

== Fencing ==
Norway has qualified 1 fencer.

Men

Athlete	Event	Round of 32	Round of 16	Quarterfinal	Semifinal	Final / BM	
Athlete	Event	Opposition Score	Opposition Score	Opposition Score	Opposition Score	Opposition Score	Rank
Bartosz Piasecki	Individual épée	Grumier (FRA); W 14–13	Imre (HUN); W 15–7	Borel (FRA); W 15–14	Jung J-S (KOR); W 15–13	Limardo (VEN); L 10–15	2nd place, silver medalist(s)

== Handball ==
Norway women's handball team will participate in the Olympic Games as European Champions, World Champions, and as defending Olympic Champions.

- Women's team event – 1 team of 14 players

=== Women's tournament ===
The following is the Norway roster in the women's handball tournament of the 2012 Summer Olympics.

Head coaches: Thorir Hergeirsson

No.	Pos.	Name	Date of birth (age)	Height	App.	Goals	Club
1	GK	Kari Aalvik Grimsbø	4 January 1985 (aged 27)	1.80 m			(Denmark) Team Esbjerg
5	LB	Ida Alstad	13 June 1985 (aged 27)	1.72 m			(Norway) Byåsen HE
6	P	Heidi Løke	12 December 1982 (aged 29)	1.77 m			(Hungary) Győri ETO KC
7	RB	Tonje Nøstvold	7 May 1985 (aged 27)	1.78 m			(Norway) Byåsen HE
8	CB	Karoline Dyhre Breivang	10 May 1980 (aged 32)	1.72 m			(Norway) Larvik HK
9	LB	Kristine Lunde-Borgersen	30 March 1980 (aged 32)	1.83 m			(Norway) IK Våg
11	LW	Kari Mette Johansen	11 January 1979 (aged 33)	1.72 m			(Norway) Larvik HK
13	P	Marit Malm Frafjord	25 November 1985 (aged 26)	1.82 m			(Denmark) Viborg HK
15	RB	Linn Jørum Sulland	15 July 1984 (aged 28)	1.78 m			(Norway) Larvik HK
16	GK	Katrine Lunde Haraldsen	30 March 1980 (aged 32)	1.81 m			(Hungary) Győri ETO KC
18	RW	Linn-Kristin Riegelhuth Koren	1 August 1984 (aged 27)	1.75 m			(Norway) Larvik HK
21	CB	Gøril Snorroeggen	15 February 1985 (aged 27)	1.77 m			(Denmark) Team Esbjerg
22	RW	Amanda Kurtović	25 July 1991 (aged 21)	1.79 m			(Denmark) Viborg HK
23	LW	Camilla Herrem	8 October 1986 (aged 25)	1.66 m			(Norway) Byåsen HE

Group play

Team	Pld	W	D	L	GF	GA	GD	Pts	Qualification
France	5	4	1	0	125	103	+22	9	Quarter-finals
South Korea	5	3	1	1	136	130	+6	7	Quarter-finals
Spain	5	3	1	1	119	114	+5	7	Quarter-finals
Norway	5	2	1	2	118	120	−2	5	Quarter-finals
Denmark	5	1	0	4	113	121	−8	2	
Sweden	5	0	0	5	108	131	−23	0	

28 July 2012; 21:15	Norway	23 – 24	France	Copper Box, London; Attendance: 3,968; Referees: Krstić, Ljubić (SLO)
28 July 2012; 21:15	Alstad 5	(12–17)	Baudouin, Signaté 5	Copper Box, London; Attendance: 3,968; Referees: Krstić, Ljubić (SLO)
28 July 2012; 21:15	3× (yellow card) 2× (suspension)	Report	4× (yellow card) 5× (suspension) 1× (red card)	Copper Box, London; Attendance: 3,968; Referees: Krstić, Ljubić (SLO)

30 July 2012; 21:15	Sweden	21 – 24	Norway	Copper Box, London; Attendance: 4,459; Referees: Coulibaly, Diabate (CIV)
30 July 2012; 21:15	Torstenson 6	(9–14)	Koren, Sulland 5	Copper Box, London; Attendance: 4,459; Referees: Coulibaly, Diabate (CIV)
30 July 2012; 21:15	3× (yellow card) 3× (suspension)	Report	3× (yellow card) 3× (suspension)	Copper Box, London; Attendance: 4,459; Referees: Coulibaly, Diabate (CIV)

1 August 2012; 09:30	Norway	27 – 27	South Korea	Copper Box, London; Attendance: 4,178; Referees: Nachevski, Nikolov (MKD)
1 August 2012; 09:30	Sulland 11	(13–15)	three players 6	Copper Box, London; Attendance: 4,178; Referees: Nachevski, Nikolov (MKD)
1 August 2012; 09:30	3× (yellow card)	Report	2× (yellow card) 3× (suspension)	Copper Box, London; Attendance: 4,178; Referees: Nachevski, Nikolov (MKD)

3 August 2012; 21:15	Denmark	23 – 24	Norway	Copper Box, London; Attendance: 4,720; Referees: Horáček, Novotný (CZE)
3 August 2012; 21:15	Nørgaard 9	(11–12)	Løke 6	Copper Box, London; Attendance: 4,720; Referees: Horáček, Novotný (CZE)
3 August 2012; 21:15	3× (yellow card) 2× (suspension)	Report	3× (yellow card)	Copper Box, London; Attendance: 4,720; Referees: Horáček, Novotný (CZE)

5 August 2012; 19:30	Norway	20 – 25	Spain	Copper Box, London; Attendance: 4,345; Referees: Krstić, Ljubić (SLO)
5 August 2012; 19:30	Koren 6	(11–11)	Alonso 7	Copper Box, London; Attendance: 4,345; Referees: Krstić, Ljubić (SLO)
5 August 2012; 19:30	3× (yellow card) 4× (suspension)	Report	3× (yellow card) 4× (suspension) 1× (red card)	Copper Box, London; Attendance: 4,345; Referees: Krstić, Ljubić (SLO)

Quarter-final

7 August 2012; 10:00	Brazil	19 – 21	Norway	Copper Box, London; Attendance: 4,549; Referees: Bonaventura, Bonaventura (FRA)
7 August 2012; 10:00	do Nascimento 5	(13–9)	Koren 5	Copper Box, London; Attendance: 4,549; Referees: Bonaventura, Bonaventura (FRA)
7 August 2012; 10:00	3× (yellow card) 3× (suspension)	Report	2× (yellow card) 1× (suspension)	Copper Box, London; Attendance: 4,549; Referees: Bonaventura, Bonaventura (FRA)

Semi-final

9 August 2012; 17:00	Norway	31 – 25	South Korea	Basketball Arena, London; Attendance: 9,274; Referees: Gubica, Milošević (CRO)
9 August 2012; 17:00	Løke 8	(18–15)	Gwon Han-na 7	Basketball Arena, London; Attendance: 9,274; Referees: Gubica, Milošević (CRO)
9 August 2012; 17:00	3× (yellow card) 2× (suspension)	Report	3× (yellow card) 2× (suspension)	Basketball Arena, London; Attendance: 9,274; Referees: Gubica, Milošević (CRO)

Final

11 August 2012; 20:30	Norway	26 – 23	Montenegro	Basketball Arena, London; Attendance: 9,739; Referees: Bonaventura, Bonaventura (FRA)
11 August 2012; 20:30	Sulland 10	(13–10)	Bulatović 10	Basketball Arena, London; Attendance: 9,739; Referees: Bonaventura, Bonaventura (FRA)
11 August 2012; 20:30	3× (yellow card) 3× (suspension)	Report	3× (yellow card) 7× (suspension) 1× (red card)	Basketball Arena, London; Attendance: 9,739; Referees: Bonaventura, Bonaventura (FRA)

Final rank
Gold

== Rowing ==
Norway has so far qualified boats for the following events

Men

Athlete	Event	Heats		Repechage		Quarterfinals		Semifinals		Final	
Athlete	Event	Time	Rank	Time	Rank	Time	Rank	Time	Rank	Time	Rank
Olaf Tufte	Single sculls	7:00.90	2 QF	Bye		6:55.36	3 SA/B	7:35.31	6 FB	7:18.15	9
Kjetil Borch; Nils Jakob Hoff	Double sculls	6:16.31	1 SA/B	Bye		—N/a		6:22.88	4 FB	6:20.82	7
Kristoffer Brun; Are Strandli	Lightweight double sculls	6:34.00	2 SA/B	Bye		—N/a		6:39.59	4 FB	6:32.82	9

Qualification Legend: FA=Final A (medal); FB=Final B (non-medal); FC=Final C (non-medal); FD=Final D (non-medal); FE=Final E (non-medal); FF=Final F (non-medal); SA/B=Semifinals A/B; SC/D=Semifinals C/D; SE/F=Semifinals E/F; QF=Quarterfinals; R=Repechage

== Sailing ==
Norway has qualified 1 boat for each of the following events

Men

Athlete	Event	Race											Net points	Final rank
Athlete	Event	1	2	3	4	5	6	7	8	9	10	M*	Net points	Final rank
Sebastian Wang-Hansen	RS:X	19	17	31	18	18	20	19	18	25	~~32~~	EL	185	24
Kristian Ruth	Laser	32	14	10	17	15	5	~~DNF~~	24	8	20	EL	145	16
Eivind Melleby; Petter Mørland Pedersen	Star	7	5	2	4	~~16~~	11	8	4	7	5	10	63	4

Women

Athlete	Event	Race											Net points	Final rank
Athlete	Event	1	2	3	4	5	6	7	8	9	10	M*	Net points	Final rank
Jannicke Stålstrøm	RS:X	21	17	~~24~~	21	17	18	21	15	12	15	EL	142	19
Marthe Enger Eide	Laser Radial	30	24	~~32~~	11	23	15	23	21	17	30	EL	194	23

M = Medal race; EL = Eliminated – did not advance into the medal race;

== Shooting ==
The following quota places have been qualified for the Norwegian shooting squad at the Games;

Men

Athlete	Event	Qualification		Final	
Athlete	Event	Points	Rank	Points	Rank
Ole Magnus Bakken	50 m rifle prone	592	26	Did not advance	
Ole Magnus Bakken	10 m air rifle	597	6 Q	691.5	8
Odd Arne Brekne	50 m rifle prone	594	13	Did not advance	
Tore Brovold	Skeet	113	27	Did not advance	
Ole Kristian Bryhn	50 m rifle 3 positions	1169	7 Q	1267.8	7
Are Hansen	50 m rifle 3 positions	1163	22	Did not advance	
Are Hansen	10 m air rifle	594	14	Did not advance	

Women

Athlete	Event	Qualification		Final	
Athlete	Event	Points	Rank	Points	Rank
Malin Westerheim	50 m rifle 3 positions	579	20	Did not advance	
Malin Westerheim	10 m air rifle	394	25	Did not advance	

== Swimming ==
Norwegian swimmers have so far achieved qualifying standards in the following events (up to a maximum of 2 swimmers in each event at the Olympic Qualifying Time (OQT), and potentially 1 at the Olympic Selection Time (OST)):

Men

Athlete	Event	Heat		Semifinal		Final	
Athlete	Event	Time	Rank	Time	Rank	Time	Rank
Lavrans Solli	100 m backstroke	55.00	26	Did not advance			

Women

Athlete	Event	Heat		Semifinal		Final	
Athlete	Event	Time	Rank	Time	Rank	Time	Rank
Sara Nordenstam	200 m breaststroke	2:27.90	21	Did not advance			
Sara Nordenstam	400 m individual medley	4:51.28	30	—N/a		Did not advance	
Ingvild Snildal	100 m butterfly	59.01	22	Did not advance			
Ingvild Snildal	200 m butterfly	2:10.99 NR	18	Did not advance			

== Volleyball ==
=== Beach ===
The men's team qualified after winning the CEV Continental Beach Volleyball Cup.

Athlete	Event	Preliminary round	Standing	Round of 16	Quarterfinals	Semifinals	Final / BM	
Athlete	Event	Opposition Score	Standing	Opposition Score	Opposition Score	Opposition Score	Opposition Score	Rank
Tarjei Skarlund; Martin Spinnangr	Men's	Pool F Cunha – Santos (BRA); L 0 – 2 (14–21, 18–21); Binstock – Reader (CAN); W 2 – 0 (21–14, 21–18); Garcia Thompson – Grotowski (GBR); W 2 – 0 (22–20, 21–13)	2 Q	Pļaviņš – Šmēdiņš (LAT); L 0 – 2 (18–21, 17–21)	Did not advance			9

== Wrestling ==
Norway has qualified one quota.

Key:

- VT - Victory by Fall.
- PP - Decision by Points - the loser with technical points.
- PO - Decision by Points - the loser without technical points.

Men's Greco-Roman

Athlete	Event	Qualification	Round of 16	Quarterfinal	Semifinal	Repechage 1	Repechage 2	Final / BM	
Athlete	Event	Opposition Result	Opposition Result	Opposition Result	Opposition Result	Opposition Result	Opposition Result	Opposition Result	Rank
Stig André Berge	−60 kg	Bye	Aliyev (AZE); L 1–3 ^{PP}	Did not advance					13
