= 2017–18 Eliteserien (women's handball) =

Eliteserien
- Season: 2017–18
- Champions: Vipers Kristiansand (1st title)
- Relegated: Sola HK; Stabæk; Glassverket
- Champions League: Vipers Kristiansand
- EHF Cup: Larvik HK; Storhamar Elite; Byåsen Elite; Fredrikstad BK
- Matches: 146
- Goals: 7,905 (54.14 per match)
- Top goalscorer: Linn Jørum Sulland (168 goals)
- Biggest home win: 24 goals: LHK 36–12 GLA; STO 46–22 OPP
- Biggest away win: 29 goals: STA 17–46 VIP
- Highest scoring: 73 goals: STO 32–41 LHK

The 2017–18 Eliteserien is the 51st season of the Eliteserien, Norway's premier handball league.

== Teams ==
A total of 12 teams will be participating in the 2017/18 edition of Eliteserien. Of these, 10 teams qualified directly from the 2016/17 season and the top two teams from the First Division, Molde Elite and Fredrikstad BK.

Team	Location	Arena	Capacity	Clubs locations in Norway
Byåsen Elite	Trondheim	Trondheim Spektrum	3400	Clubs locations in Norway
Fredrikstad BK	Fredrikstad	Kongstenhallen	1500	Clubs locations in Norway
Gjerpen IF	Skien	Skienshallen	2800	Clubs locations in Norway
Glassverket Elite	Drammen	Drammenshallen	4200	Clubs locations in Norway
Larvik HK	Larvik	Boligmappa Arena Larvik	4500	Clubs locations in Norway
Molde Elite	Molde	Molde Arena	2000	Clubs locations in Norway
Oppsal IF	Oslo	Oppsal Arena	5000	Clubs locations in Norway
Sola HK	Sola	Åsenhallen	1200	Clubs locations in Norway
Stabæk IF	Bærum	Nadderud Arena	2050	Clubs locations in Norway
Storhamar Elite	Hamar	Boligpartner Arena	1650	Clubs locations in Norway
Tertnes Elite	Bergen	Haukelandshallen	5000	Clubs locations in Norway
Vipers Kristiansand	Kristiansand	Aquarama	2200	Clubs locations in Norway

== Regular season ==
=== Standings ===
Pos	Team	Pld	W	D	L	GF	GA	GD	Pts	Qualification or relegation
1	Vipers Kristiansand	22	18	2	2	698	512	+186	38	Championship play-offs + advance to Champions League
2	Larvik HK	22	18	1	3	679	513	+166	37	Championship play-offs + advance to EHF Cup
3	Storhamar Håndball Elite	22	17	0	5	676	559	+117	34	Championship play-offs + advance to EHF Cup
4	Byåsen Elite	22	14	0	8	641	549	+92	28	Championship play-offs + advance to EHF Cup
5	Tertnes Håndball Elite	22	13	0	9	556	546	+10	26	Championship play-offs
6	Fredrikstad BK	22	10	1	11	544	590	−46	21	Championship play-offs + advance to EHF Cup
7	Gjerpen HK Skien	22	9	0	13	582	600	−18	18	Championship play-offs
8	Oppsal	22	8	2	12	563	614	−51	18	Championship play-offs
9	Molde Elite	22	7	2	13	564	631	−67	16	
10	Sola HK	22	7	1	14	537	592	−55	15	Play-off against the third team from First Division
11	Stabæk	22	5	1	16	549	654	−105	11	Relegated to First Division
12	Glassverket	22	1	0	21	516	745	−229	2	Relegated to First Division

Updated to match(es) played on 18 April 2018. Source:
Rules for classification: 1.) Points in head-to-head matches amongst tied teams; 2.) Goal difference in head-to-head matches amongst tied teams; 3.) Goals scored in head-to-head matches among tied teams; 4.) Points in all matches; 5.) Goal difference in all matches.

=== Results ===
In the table below the home teams are listed on the left and the away teams along the top.

Home \ Away	BYÅ	FBK	GJE	GLA	LHK	MOL	OPP	SOL	STA	STO	TER	VIP
Byåsen Elite		31–21	38–22	34–15	24–31	36–26	36–29	26–25	29–20	31–32	33–22	16–22
Fredrikstad BK	23–33		21–37	31–22	21–28	26–24	24–21	30–25	26–25	28–24	22–26	18–26
Gjerpen HK Skien	20–25	26–24		35–21	20–40	27–22	32–25	26–21	40–25	24–27	19–28	30–38
Glassverket	28–39	31–35	24–28		19–41	24–26	24–33	26–41	29–36	22–41	27–30	19–43
Larvik HK	32–28	25–28	32–26	36–12		36–23	30–22	26–16	33–26	33–23	27–19	25–25
Molde Elite	28–34	27–27	29–25	28–24	26–33		31–31	28–27	27–26	21–23	21–28	30–34
Oppsal	20–33	26–19	31–26	30–25	23–24	26–27		28–26	33–31	20–33	26–29	30–30
Sola HK	25–22	27–31	20–28	28–29	27–26	27–25	21–20		22–27	25–31	23–26	28–27
Stabæk	24–28	22–24	26–21	29–26	17–35	34–31	25–30	21–21		22–34	21–30	17–46
Storhamar Håndball Elite	34–28	28–20	32–28	36–31	29–30	27–19	46–22	35–20	28–20		26–23	25–34
Tertnes Håndball Elite	20–21	27–24	23–19	31–21	28–29	25–29	20–19	20–22	31–27	22–32		26–25
Vipers Kristiansand	30–26	29–21	28–23	34–17	31–27	31–16	32–18	34–20	30–28	36–30	33–22	

Legend: Blue = home team win; Yellow = draw; Red = away team win.

== Championship playoffs ==
=== Quarterfinals ===
25 April; 18:00	Oppsal	22–36	Vipers Kristiansand	Oppsal Arena, Oslo; Attendance: 287; Referees: Kvakic, Eriksen
25 April; 18:00	Røkke 7	(9–15)	Sulland 8	Oppsal Arena, Oslo; Attendance: 287; Referees: Kvakic, Eriksen
25 April; 18:00	2× (yellow card) 2× (suspension)	Report	3× (yellow card) 3× (suspension)	Oppsal Arena, Oslo; Attendance: 287; Referees: Kvakic, Eriksen

29 April; 15:30	Vipers Kristiansand	38–18	Oppsal	Aquarama, Kristiansand; Attendance: 845; Referees: Lien, Blokkhus
29 April; 15:30	Brattset 8	(16–11)	Andersen 7	Aquarama, Kristiansand; Attendance: 845; Referees: Lien, Blokkhus
29 April; 15:30	2× (yellow card) 3× (suspension)	Report	1× (yellow card) 2× (suspension)	Aquarama, Kristiansand; Attendance: 845; Referees: Lien, Blokkhus

Vipers Kristiansand won 74–40 on aggregate.

25 April; 18:30	Fredrikstad BK	20–37	Larvik HK	Kongstenhallen, Fredrikstad; Attendance: 408; Referees: Johannessen, Larsen
25 April; 18:30	Andersen 9	(10–23)	Breistøl 9	Kongstenhallen, Fredrikstad; Attendance: 408; Referees: Johannessen, Larsen
25 April; 18:30	2× (yellow card) 5× (suspension)	Report	1× (yellow card) 3× (suspension)	Kongstenhallen, Fredrikstad; Attendance: 408; Referees: Johannessen, Larsen

29 April; 17:00	Larvik HK	36–25	Fredrikstad BK	Boligmappa Arena, Larvik; Attendance: 681; Referees: Liltved, Jørstad
29 April; 17:00	Tollbring, Rivas Toft 6	(19–13)	Syversen 8	Boligmappa Arena, Larvik; Attendance: 681; Referees: Liltved, Jørstad
29 April; 17:00	2× (yellow card) 1× (suspension)	Report	3× (yellow card) 1× (suspension)	Boligmappa Arena, Larvik; Attendance: 681; Referees: Liltved, Jørstad

Larvik HK won 73–45 on aggregate.

25 April; 18:00	Tertnes Håndball Elite	28–30	Storhamar Håndball Elite	Haukelandshallen, Bergen; Attendance: 584; Referees: Nygren, Borge
25 April; 18:00	Sivertsen 10	(18–16)	Riegelhuth 11	Haukelandshallen, Bergen; Attendance: 584; Referees: Nygren, Borge
25 April; 18:00	3× (yellow card) 3× (suspension)	Report	3× (yellow card) 4× (suspension)	Haukelandshallen, Bergen; Attendance: 584; Referees: Nygren, Borge

29 April; 17:00	Storhamar Håndball Elite	28–25	Tertnes Håndball Elite	Boligpartner Arena, Hamar; Attendance: – Referees: Fremstad, Pedersen
29 April; 17:00	Løke 6	(15–9)	Hilby 6	Boligpartner Arena, Hamar; Attendance: – Referees: Fremstad, Pedersen
29 April; 17:00	2× (yellow card) 3× (suspension)	Report	3× (yellow card) 4× (suspension)	Boligpartner Arena, Hamar; Attendance: – Referees: Fremstad, Pedersen

Storhamar Håndball Elite won 58–53 on aggregate.

25 April; 20:00	Gjerpen HK Skien	27–29	Byåsen Elite	Skienshallen, Skien; Attendance: – Referees: Jørum, Kleven
25 April; 20:00	Bak 10	(16–12)	Jacobsen 9	Skienshallen, Skien; Attendance: – Referees: Jørum, Kleven
25 April; 20:00	4× (suspension)	Report	2× (yellow card) 1× (suspension)	Skienshallen, Skien; Attendance: – Referees: Jørum, Kleven

29 April; 18:45	Byåsen Elite	27–27	Gjerpen HK Skien	Trondheim Spektrum, Trondheim; Attendance: 350; Referees: Braseth, Sundet
29 April; 18:45	Högdahl 9	(15–17)	Bak, Groa, Hendrikse 5	Trondheim Spektrum, Trondheim; Attendance: 350; Referees: Braseth, Sundet
29 April; 18:45	3× (yellow card)	Report	3× (yellow card) 2× (suspension)	Trondheim Spektrum, Trondheim; Attendance: 350; Referees: Braseth, Sundet

Byåsen Elite won 56–54 on aggregate.

=== Bracket ===
Highest ranked team from the regular season selects the opponent. The remaining two highest ranked teams from the regular season can not meet in the semifinals.

Semifinals
1	Vipers Kristiansand	28	30	58
4	Byåsen Elite	23	25	48
2	Larvik HK	41	27	68
3	Storhamar Håndball Elite	32	22	54

Finals
1	Vipers Kristiansand	29	40	69
2	Larvik HK	22	28	50

=== Semifinals ===
2 May; 18:30	Byåsen Elite	23–28	Vipers Kristiansand	Trondheim Spektrum, Trondheim; Attendance: 766; Referees: Nygren, Borge
2 May; 18:30	Venn, Högdahl 5	(13–17)	Brattset 6	Trondheim Spektrum, Trondheim; Attendance: 766; Referees: Nygren, Borge
2 May; 18:30	3× (yellow card) 3× (suspension)	Report	5× (suspension)	Trondheim Spektrum, Trondheim; Attendance: 766; Referees: Nygren, Borge

8 May; 18:30	Vipers Kristiansand	30–25	Byåsen Elite	Aquarama, Kristiansand; Attendance: 787; Referees: Johannessen, Larsen
8 May; 18:30	Kristiansen 7	(17–11)	Örvarsdottir 6	Aquarama, Kristiansand; Attendance: 787; Referees: Johannessen, Larsen
8 May; 18:30	2× (yellow card) 4× (suspension)	Report	4× (yellow card) 2× (suspension)	Aquarama, Kristiansand; Attendance: 787; Referees: Johannessen, Larsen

Vipers Kristiansand won 58–48 on aggregate.

6 May; 18:00	Storhamar Håndball Elite	32–41	Larvik HK	Boligpartner Arena, Hamar; Attendance: 1229; Referees: Jørum, Kleven
6 May; 18:00	Enkerud 7	(13–19)	Mørk, Rivas Toft 8	Boligpartner Arena, Hamar; Attendance: 1229; Referees: Jørum, Kleven
6 May; 18:00	3× (suspension)	Report	1× (yellow card) 3× (suspension)	Boligpartner Arena, Hamar; Attendance: 1229; Referees: Jørum, Kleven

9 May; 18:45	Larvik HK	27–22	Storhamar Håndball Elite	Boligmappa Arena, Larvik; Attendance: – Referees: Isachsen, Hell
9 May; 18:45	Hjertner 6	(13–8)	Zimny 6	Boligmappa Arena, Larvik; Attendance: – Referees: Isachsen, Hell
9 May; 18:45	2× (yellow card) 1× (suspension)	Report	2× (yellow card) 5× (suspension)	Boligmappa Arena, Larvik; Attendance: – Referees: Isachsen, Hell

Larvik HK won 68–54 on aggregate.

=== Finals ===
15 May; 18:45	Larvik HK	22–29	Vipers Kristiansand	Boligmappa Arena, Larvik; Attendance: 596; Referees: Røen, Arntsen
15 May; 18:45	Andenæs 6	(15–13)	Brattset 7	Boligmappa Arena, Larvik; Attendance: 596; Referees: Røen, Arntsen
15 May; 18:45	3× (yellow card) 2× (suspension)	Report	2× (yellow card) 3× (suspension)	Boligmappa Arena, Larvik; Attendance: 596; Referees: Røen, Arntsen

19 May; 17:15	Vipers Kristiansand	40–28	Larvik HK	Aquarama, Kristiansand; Attendance: – Referees: Nygren, Borge
19 May; 17:15	Brattset 8	(21–12)	Andenæs, Mørk 7	Aquarama, Kristiansand; Attendance: – Referees: Nygren, Borge
19 May; 17:15	2× (yellow card) 3× (suspension)	Report	2× (yellow card) 2× (suspension)	Aquarama, Kristiansand; Attendance: – Referees: Nygren, Borge

Vipers Kristiansand won the final 69–50 on aggregate.

2017–18 Eliteserien Champions
Vipers Kristiansand
1st title

Sakura Hauge, Eline Fagerheim, Katrine Lunde, Malin Aune, Pernille Wang Skaug, Karine Dahlum, Vilde Jonassen, Sunniva Næs Andersen, Kari Brattset (c), Mathilde Kristensen, Emilie Hegh Arntzen, Jeanett Kristiansen, Lina Jensen, Mathilde Flo Hjetland, Karoline Olsen, Tonje Refsnes, Kristine Lunde-Borgersen, Marta Tomac, Kristin Nørstebø, Linn Jørum Sulland
Head coach
Kenneth Gabrielsen

== Top goalscorers ==
=== Regular season ===
As of the end of the regular season.

Rank	Player	Club	Goals
1	(Denmark) Melanie Bak	Gjerpen HK Skien	143
2	(Norway) Ida Marie Wernersen	Fredrikstad BK	139
3	(Norway) Linn Jørum Sulland	Vipers Kristiansand	138
4	(Norway) Ragnhild Valle Dahl	Molde Elite	132
5	(Norway) Betina Riegelhuth	Storhamar HE	124
6	(Norway) Marit Røsberg Jacobsen	Byåsen Elite	118
7	(Norway) Henny Reistad	Stabæk	116
8	(Norway) Kari Brattset	Vipers Kristiansand	108
9	(Norway) Tonje Nøstvold	Sola HK	106
10	(Norway) Celine Sivertsen	Tertnes HE	104
10	(Norway) Line Ellertsen	Sola HK	104
10	(Norway) Jenny Handal Sneve	Stabæk	104

=== Playoffs ===
As of the end of the playoffs.

Rank	Player	Club	Goals
1	(Norway) Kari Brattset	Vipers Kristiansand	39
2	(Norway) Linn Jørum Sulland	Vipers Kristiansand	30
2	(Norway) Jeanett Kristiansen	Vipers Kristiansand	30
4	(Norway) June Andenæs	Larvik HK	26
5	(Norway) Moa Högdahl	Byåsen Elite	25
6	(Norway) Mathilde Rivas Toft	Larvik HK	24
7	(Norway) Thea Mørk	Larvik HK	20
7	(Norway) Kristine Breistøl	Larvik HK	20
7	(Norway) Maria Hjertner	Larvik HK	20
10	(Norway) Marit Røsberg Jacobsen	Byåsen Elite	18

=== Overall ===
As of the end of the season.

Rank	Player	Club	Goals
1	(Norway) Linn Jørum Sulland	Vipers Kristiansand	168
2	(Denmark) Melanie Bak	Gjerpen HK Skien	158
3	(Norway) Ida Marie Wernersen	Fredrikstad BK	147
3	(Norway) Kari Brattset	Vipers Kristiansand	147
5	(Norway) Betina Riegelhuth	Storhamar HE	140
6	(Norway) Marit Røsberg Jacobsen	Byåsen Elite	136
7	(Norway) Ragnhild Valle Dahl	Molde Elite	132
8	(Norway) Moa Högdahl	Byåsen Elite	125
9	(Norway) Celine Sivertsen	Tertnes HE	117
10	(Norway) Henny Reistad	Stabæk	116

== Relegation playoff ==
25 April; 18:30	Rælingen HK	30–20	Sola HK	Marikolhallen, Rælingen; Attendance: 478; Referees: Liltved, Jørstad
25 April; 18:30	Hanssen 8	(16–10)	Nøstvold 8	Marikolhallen, Rælingen; Attendance: 478; Referees: Liltved, Jørstad
25 April; 18:30	2× (yellow card) 4× (suspension)	Report	3× (yellow card) 3× (suspension)	Marikolhallen, Rælingen; Attendance: 478; Referees: Liltved, Jørstad

29 April; 18:00	Sola HK	25–17	Rælingen HK	Åsenhallen, Sola; Attendance: – Referees: Kvakic, Eriksen
29 April; 18:00	Knutsen 7	(12–10)	Hanssen 7	Åsenhallen, Sola; Attendance: – Referees: Kvakic, Eriksen
29 April; 18:00	2× (yellow card) 4× (suspension)	Report	2× (yellow card) 3× (suspension)	Åsenhallen, Sola; Attendance: – Referees: Kvakic, Eriksen

Rælingen HK won 47–45 on aggregate and were promoted to Eliteserien, Sola HK were relegated to First Division.
