= Mari Molid =

Norwegian handball player (born 1990)

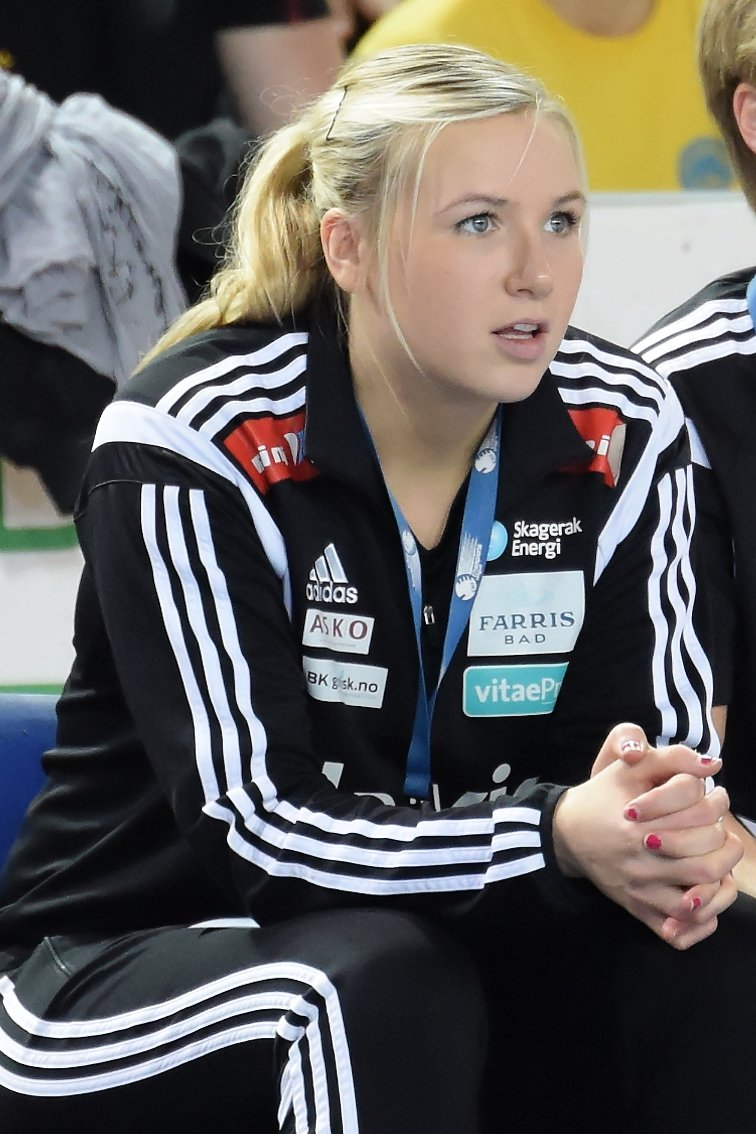
- Molid in 2014

Personal information
- Full name: Mari Kristine Søbstad Molid
- Nationality: Norwegian
- Born: 8 August 1990 (age 36) Trondheim, Norway
- Height: 1.78 m (5 ft 10 in)

Sport
- Sport: Handball
- Position: Left back
- Current club: Strindheim IL

Senior clubs
- Years: Team
- 2006–2012: Byåsen HE
- 2012–2014: Levanger HK
- 2014–2016: Larvik HK
- 2016–2018: Randers HK
- 2018–2019: Larvik HK
- 2019–2021: Molde Elite
- 2021–2022: Byåsen HE
- 2023–: Strindheim IL
National team
Years	Team	Apps	(Gls)
2010–2018	Norway	107	(57)
Medal record
Olympic Games
Bronze medal – third place	2016 Rio de Janeiro	Team
World Championship
Gold medal – first place	2011 Brazil
Gold medal – first place	2015 Denmark
European Championship
Gold medal – first place	2010 Denmark/Norway
Junior World Championship
Gold medal – first place	2010 South Korea
Junior European Championship
Gold medal – first place	2009 Hungary

Mari Molid Brekke (born 8 August 1990) is a Norwegian handball player for Strindheim IL and formerly the Norwegian national team.

The former Norwegian national team coach Thorir Hergeirsson described her as a player with "very good defensive qualities and a good shot."

== Career ==
Molid started playing handball at Kolstad IL, and later joined Byåsen IL, where she made her senior debut in the 2006–07 season. In her first season, she reached the final of the EHF Cup Winners' Cup with Byåsen, where they lost to Romanian CS Oltchim Râmnicu Vâlcea.

In 2012, she signed for Levanger HK. In 2014-15 she joined Larvik HK auf. Here she won the 2015 and 2016 Norwegian championship.

In 2016, she joined Danish team Randers HK. Here she won the 2016 Danish Cup.

In 2018, she returned to Larvik HK, where she was the club captain. Leading up the semifinal of the 2018-19 Norwegian championship, she and group of other Larvik players refused to play the match, as they had not been paid. After the season had ended Larvik HK were administratively relegated to the 1st Division for failing to pay their players.

The following season, Molid joined Molde HK. In 2021 she returned to Byåsen IL.

=== National team ===
She made her debut on the Norwegian national team on 22 September 2010.

The same year, she won the 2010 European Championship with Norway. A year later, she won the 2011 World Championship.

She also represented Norway at the 2013 World Championship.

At the 2015 World Championship, she won her second World Cup title. She was however injured during the tournament and was replaced by Ida Alstad.

A year later, she won bronze medals at the 2016 Olympics in Rio, losing to Russia in the semifinals in extra time and beating Netherlands in the third place playoff.

== Achievements ==
- Olympic Games:
  - Bronze Medalist: 2016
- World Championship:
  - Winner: 2011, 2015
- European Championship:
  - Winner: 2010
- Junior World Championship:
  - Winner: 2010
- Junior European Championship:
  - Winner: 2009
- Norwegian Championship:
  - Winner: 2014/2015, 2015/2016
- Norwegian Cup:
  - Winner: 2007, 2014, 2015
  - Finalist: 2008, 2009
- Danish Cup:
  - Winner: 2016
