= Silje Waade =

Norwegian handball player (born 1994)

Personal information
- Full name: Silje Katrine Waade
- Nationality: Norwegian
- Born: 20 March 1994 (age 32) Stjørdal, Norway
- Height: 1.83 m (6 ft 0 in)

Sport
- Sport: Handball
- Position: Right back
- Current club: Byåsen HE
- Number: 10

Senior clubs
- Years: Team
- 2010–2018: Byåsen HE
- 2018–01/2025: Vipers Kristiansand
- 02/2025–: Byåsen HE
National team
Years	Team	Apps	(Gls)
2016–2020	Norway	47	(57)
Medal record
European Championship
Gold medal – first place	2016 Sweden
Youth World Championship
Bronze medal – third place	2012 Montenegro

Silje Katrine Waade (born 20 March 1994) is a Norwegian handball player for Byåsen HE and formerly the Norwegian national team.

She was an active track athlete until 17 years of age.

She also represented Norway in the 2013 Women's Junior European Handball Championship, placing 4th. At her first major international tournament, the 2016 European Women's Handball Championship, she won gold medals.

== Achievements ==
- European Championship
  - Winner: 2016
- World Youth Championship:
  - Bronze Medalist: 2012
- EHF Champions League:
  - Winner: 2020/2021, 2021/2022, 2022/2023
  - Bronze medalist: 2018/2019
- Norwegian League:
  - Winner: 2018/2019, 2019/2020, 2020/2021, 2021/2022, 2022/2023, 2023/2024
  - Silver Medalist: 2011/2012, 2012/2013, 2013/2014
  - Bronze Medalist: 2010/2011
- Norwegian Cup:
  - Winner: 2018, 2019, 2020, 2021, 2022/23, 2023/24

== Individual awards ==
- All-Star Right Wing of Golden League 2016
- Best Right Back in the month of September 2016, Grundigligaen 2016/2017
