= 2006–07 EHF Women's Cup Winner's Cup =

European Handball Tournament

The 2006–07 EHF Women's Cup Winner's Cup was the 31st season of the tournament organised by EHF.

The final was played between Oltchim Râmnicu Vâlcea and Byåsen Trondheim. Oltchim defeated Byåsen 59–53 and have earned the right to play in the EHF Champions Trophy in Romania.

== 2nd Round ==
2nd Round gamess were played on the 13./14./20. October and on the 15./21./22. November 2006.

| Team 1 | Agg. | Team 2 | 1st leg | 2nd leg |
|---|---|---|---|---|
| ŽRK Tvin-Trgocentar Virovitica (Croatia) | 88 : 41 | KH Kosovo Vushtrri | 49 : 23 | 39 : 18 |
| Ambalaza Kabran Kavadarci (North Macedonia) | 43 : 81 | (Slovakia) HK Slovan Duslo Šaľa | 21 : 45 | 22 : 36 |
| HC Astrakhanochka (Russia) | 55 : 37 | (Portugal) CD Gil Eanes/Lagos | 29 : 14 | 26 : 23 |
| DHW Antwerpen (Belgium) | 25 : 94 | (Romania) Oltchim Râmnicu Vâlcea | 11 : 47 | 14 : 47 |
| HC Teramo 2002 (Italy) | 36 : 46 | (Switzerland) LC Brühl Handball | 18 : 24 | 18 : 22 |
| Haukar Hafnarfjörður (Iceland) | 48 : 53 | (Hungary) Cornexi Alcoa-HSB Holding | 26 : 31 | 22 : 22 |
| A.C. Ormi School Patras (Greece) | 60 : 44 | (Sweden) Önnereds HK | 32 : 23 | 28 : 21 |
| SPES Kefalovrisos (Cyprus) | 46 : 64 | (Austria) MGA Handball Wien | 25 : 37 | 21 : 27 |
| AKABA Bera Bera (Spain) | 74 : 33 | (Netherlands) HV Beeker Fusie Club | 42 : 17 | 32 : 16 |
| ABU Baku (Azerbaijan) | 54^{*} : 54 | (Poland) MKS Zagłębie Lubin | 27 : 25 | 27 : 29 |
| HC Spartak Kyiv (Ukraine) | 65 : 39 | (Israel) Bnei Herzliya | 26 : 17 | 39 : 22 |

^{*} ABU Baku qualified on away goals.

== 3rd Round ==
3rd round was played on the 6./7./12./13. January and the 8./13./14. January 2007.

| Team 1 | Agg. | Team 2 | 1st leg | 2nd leg |
|---|---|---|---|---|
| AKABA Bera Bera (Spain) | 58 : 46 | (Switzerland) LC Brühl Handball | 33 : 30 | 25 : 16 |
| GOG Svendborg (Denmark) | 56 : 50 | (Slovakia) HK Slovan Duslo Šaľa | 26 : 25 | 30 : 25 |
| A.C. Ormi School Patras (Greece) | 46 : 59 | (Norway) Gjerpen Handball | 25 : 21 | 21 : 38 |
| Le Havre AC (France) | 51 : 37 | (Azerbaijan) ABU Baku | 27 : 19 | 24 : 18 |
| Cornexi Alcoa-HSB Holding (Hungary) | 48 : 65 | (Romania) Oltchim Râmnicu Vâlcea | 25 : 25 | 23 : 40 |
| ŽRK Tvin-Trgocentar Virovitica (Croatia) | 62 : 57 | (Ukraine) HC Spartak Kyiv | 32 : 31 | 30 : 26 |
| MGA Handball Wien (Austria) | 23 : 94 | (Germany) 1. FC Nürnberg | 14 : 44 | 9 : 50 |
| RK Lasta Radnički Petrol Belgrade (Serbia) | 52 : 67 | (Russia) HC Astrakhanochka | 30 : 36 | 22 : 31 |

== 4th Round ==
4th Round took place on the 16.–18. February and on the 18./24./25. February 2007.

| Team 1 | Agg. | Team 2 | 1st leg | 2nd leg |
|---|---|---|---|---|
| AKABA Bera Bera (Spain) | 50 : 53 | (Russia) HC Astrakhanochka | 29 : 24 | 21 : 29 |
| 1. FC Nürnberg (Germany) | 53 : 60 | (Romania) Oltchim Râmnicu Vâlcea | 27 : 29 | 26 : 31 |
| Le Havre AC (France) | 49 : 53 | (Denmark) GOG Svendborg | 26 : 27 | 23 : 26 |
| Gjerpen Handball (Norway) | 60 : 53 | (Croatia) ŽRK Tvin-Trgocentar Virovitica | 31 : 25 | 29 : 28 |

== Quarterfinal ==
The quarter finals wook place on the 17./23. March and on the 24./25. March 2007.

| Team 1 | Agg. | Team 2 | 1st leg | 2nd leg |
|---|---|---|---|---|
| Podravka Vegeta Koprivnica (Croatia) | 53 : 61 | (Romania) Oltchim Râmnicu Vâlcea | 32 : 27 | 21 : 34 |
| Byåsen HE (Norway) | 65 : 47 | (Russia) HC Astrakhanochka | 30 : 28 | 35 : 19 |
| Cementos La Unión Ribarroja (Spain) | 55 : 49 | (Norway) Gjerpen Handball | 30 : 21 | 25 : 28 |
| GOG Svendborg (Denmark) | 48 : 57 | (Hungary) Budapest Bank-FTC | 29 : 29 | 19 : 28 |

== Semifinals ==
The semifinals took place on the 14./15. April and on the 21./22. April 2007.

| Team 1 | Agg. | Team 2 | 1st leg | 2nd leg |
|---|---|---|---|---|
| Byåsen HE (Norway) | 59^{*} : 59 | (Spain) Cementos La Unión Ribarroja | 29 : 29 | 30 : 30 |
| Oltchim Râmnicu Vâlcea (Romania) | 64 : 50 | (Hungary) Budapest Bank-FTC | 36 : 23 | 28 : 27 |

^{*} Byåsen HE qualified on away goals.

== Finals ==
The Finals took place on the 12 May and on the 20 May 2007.

| Team 1 | Agg. | Team 2 | 1st leg | 2nd leg |
|---|---|---|---|---|
| Byåsen HE (Norway) | 53 : 59 | (Romania) Oltchim Râmnicu Vâlcea | 24 : 30 | 29 : 29 |

== Top goalscorers ==
As of 20 May 2007

| Rank | Player | Club | Goals |
|---|---|---|---|
| 1 | (Romania) Valentina Ardean-Elisei | (Romania) Oltchim Râmnicu Vâlcea | 76 |
| 2 | (Romania) Ionela Stanca | (Romania) Oltchim Râmnicu Vâlcea | 60 |
| 3 | (Romania) Ramona Maier | (Romania) Oltchim Râmnicu Vâlcea | 56 |
