= 1996–97 EHF Women's Champions League =

The 1996–97 EHF Women's Champions League was the fourth edition of the modern era of the 1961-founded competition for European national champions women's handball clubs, running from 10 October 1996 to 10 May 1997. The competition system was reformed, as the group stage was expanded from 8 to 16 teams, now replacing the Round of 16, and the quarter-finals and semifinals were reestablished.

Mar Valencia defeated Viborg HK in the final to become the first Spanish team to win the competition. Defending champion Podravka Koprivnica was defeated by the Danish in the quarter-finals.

== Round of 16 ==
Team #1	Agg.	Team #2	1st	2nd
ASPTT Metz (France)	75–25	(Georgia (country)) Martve Tbilisi	39–10	36–15
Egle Vilnius (Lithuania)	49–61	(North Macedonia) Gjorce Petrov	24–32	25–29
Viborg (Denmark)	51–36	(Switzerland) Brühl	29–14	22–22
Anadolu (Turkey)	35–64	(Norway) Byasen	20–33	15–31
Politechnik Minsk (Belarus)	45–63	(Poland) Lublin	23–31	22–32
Jedinstvo Tuzla (Bosnia and Herzegovina)	39–69	(Spain) Mar Valencia	23–34	16–35
Spartak Kyiv (Ukraine)	38–43	(Federal Republic of Yugoslavia) Budućnost Podgorica	18–19	20–24
Madeira (Portugal)	31–61	(Hungary) Ferencvárosi TC	13–38	18–23
Oltchim Ramnicu Valcea (Romania)	62–38	(Slovakia) Slovan Duslo Sala	33–16	29–22
Hapoel Petah Tikva (Israel)	45–56	(Greece) Anagennisi Artas	19–21	26–35
Krim Ljubljana (Slovenia)	52–30	(Bulgaria) Volan Sofia	21–16	31–14
Rotor Volgograd (Russia)	35–44	(Germany) Walle Bremen	20–22	15–22
Swift Roermond (Netherlands)	49–18	(Finland) HIFK	25–9	24–9

== Group stage ==
=== Group A ===
Team	Pld	W	D	L	GF	GA	GDorg	Pts
(Denmark) Viborg	6	4	1	1	153	122	+31	9
(North Macedonia) Gjorce Petrov	6	4	0	2	154	125	+29	8
(Federal Republic of Yugoslavia) Budućnost Podgorica	6	2	2	2	130	143	−13	6
(Croatia) Graničar Đurđevac	6	0	1	5	102	149	−47	1

=== Group B ===
Team	Pld	W	D	L	GF	GA	GDorg	Pts
(Spain) Mar Valencia	6	5	1	0	144	126	+18	11
(Croatia) Podravka Koprivnica	6	4	1	1	161	138	+23	8
(Poland) Lublin	6	2	0	4	155	155	0	4
(Netherlands) Swift Roermond	6	0	0	6	109	150	−41	0

=== Group C ===
Team	Pld	W	D	L	GF	GA	GDorg	Pts
(Austria) Niederösterreich	6	6	0	0	141	103	+38	12
(Norway) Byasen	6	3	0	3	114	117	−3	6
(Romania) Oltchim Ramnicu Valcea	6	1	2	3	127	133	−6	4
(France) ASPTT Metz	6	0	2	4	108	137	−29	2

=== Group D ===
Team	Pld	W	D	L	GF	GA	GDorg	Pts
(Hungary) Ferencvárosi TC	6	5	0	1	175	117	+58	10
(Slovenia) Krim Ljubljana	6	4	0	2	155	118	+37	8
(Germany) Walle Bremen	6	3	0	3	124	130	−6	6
(Greece) Anagennisi Artas	6	0	0	6	105	194	−89	0

== Quarter-finals ==
Team #1	Agg.	Team #2	1st	2nd
Gjorce Petrov (North Macedonia)	44–47	(Spain) Mar Valencia	23–20	21–27
Krim Ljubljana (Slovenia)	42–60	(Austria) Niederösterreich	21–26	21–34
Podravka Koprivnica (Croatia)	47–49	(Denmark) Viborg	25–24	22–25
Byasen HE (Norway)	41–46	(Hungary) Ferencvárosi TC	20–20	21–26

== Semifinals ==
Team #1	Agg.	Team #2	1st	2nd
Mar Valencia (Spain)	49–48	(Austria) Niederösterreich	34–22	15–26
Viborg (Denmark)	50–43	(Hungary) Ferencvárosi TC	27–24	23–19

== Final ==
Team #1	Agg.	Team #2	03.05.1997	10.05.1997
Mar Valencia (Spain)	58–50	(Denmark) Viborg	35–26	23–24
