= Gøril Snorroeggen =

Norwegian handball player (born 1985)

Personal information
- Nationality: Norwegian
- Born: 15 February 1985 (age 41) Trondheim, Norway
- Height: 1.77 m (5.8 ft)

Sport
- Sport: Handball
- Position: Left back
- Current club: Retired

Youth career
- Years: Team
- –: Kattem IL
- 1998–2002: Byåsen IL

Senior clubs
- Years: Team
- 2002–2010: Byåsen HE
- 2011–2013: Team Esbjerg
- 2014–2015: Heimdal IF
National team
Years	Team	Apps	(Gls)
2004–2012	Norway	102	(224)
Medal record
Women's handball
Representing Norway
Olympic Games
Gold medal – first place	2008 Beijing	Team
Gold medal – first place	2012 London	Team
World Championship
Silver medal – second place	2007 France
Gold medal – first place	2011 Brazil
European Championship
Gold medal – first place	2004 Hungary
Gold medal – first place	2006 Sweden

Gøril Snorroeggen (born 15 February 1985) is a former Norwegian handball player, who played for Byåsen and Esbjerg. She is a World Champion from 2011 and an Olympic Champion from 2008 and 2012.

== Career ==
She began her career at the youth sports club Kattem IL, where she then played both football and handball. At age 13, she switched handball clubs to the Byåsen youth team, but continued to play football for Kattem. She proved to be successful in both sports, and represented Norway in the respective National Youth Teams. At age 16, she made a decision to focus her career on handball and left Kattem. In 2003 she made her debut on the senior team.

In the 2004-05 season she was the top scorer in the Norwegian League with 184 goals. In 2007 she played in the final of the EHF Cup Winners' Cup, where they lost to Romanian Oltchim Râmnicu Vâlcea.

In 2010 she joined Danish side Team Esbjerg, where she played for three years before retiring to focus on her studies. In the 2011-12 season, she was selected for the Danish League all-star team. She made a comeback on the handball court on 27 September 2014 for Heimdal IF as a goalkeeper against Levanger HK on level 3.

=== National team ===
Snorroeggen made her debut on the senior national handball team on 22 October 2004, and has played 102 games, scoring 224 goals before she played her last national team match on 11 August 2012 against Montenegro. Amongst her accomplishments with the national team are the Olympic gold medals that she received at the 2008 Summer Olympics and the 2012 Summer Olympics and the gold medal at the 2011 World Championships. In 2013, she retired as a professional handball player.

== Private ==
She has studied Medicine.

Snorroeggen comes from an athletic family; her father was active in orienteering and her mother has played for Byåsen I.L., the team in which her elder sister, Marte Snorroeggen also has played for.

She is married to football goalkeeper Alexander Lund Hansen.
