= Andrea Austmo Pedersen =

Norwegian handball player (born 1994)

Personal information
- Nationality: Norwegian
- Born: 19 April 1994 (age 32) Trondheim, Norway
- Height: 1.80 m (5 ft 11 in)

Sport
- Sport: Handball
- Position: Goalkeeper
- Current club: Ikast Håndbold
- Number: 16

Youth career
- Years: Team
- –: Malvik IL
- –: Ranheim IL
- –: Utleira IL

Senior clubs
- Years: Team
- 2015–2019: Byåsen HE
- 2019–2022: Vipers Kristiansand
- 2022–2024: Ikast Håndbold
- 2024–2025: HH Elite
- 2025–: Byåsen HE
National team
Years	Team	Apps	(Gls)
2018–	Norway	19	(0)
Medal record
Youth World Championship
Bronze medal – third place	2012 Montenegro
Youth European Championship
Bronze medal – third place	2011 Czech Republic

Andrea Austmo Pedersen (born 19 April 1994) is a Norwegian handball player for Ikast Håndbold and the Norwegian national team.

She also represented Norway in the 2013 Women's Junior European Handball Championship, placing 4th, and in the 2014 Women's Junior World Handball Championship, placing 9th.

== Achievements ==
- Youth European Championship:
  - Bronze Medalist: 2011
- Youth World Championship:
  - Bronze Medalist: 2012
- EHF Champions League:
  - Winner: 2020/2021, 2021/2022
- EHF European League:
  - Winner: 2022/2023
- Norwegian League:
  - Winner: 2019/2020, 2020/2021, 2021/2022
- Norwegian Cup:
  - Winner: 2019, 2020, 2021
