= Siri Eftedal =

Norwegian handball player (born 1966)

Personal information
- Full name: Siri Eftedal Seland
- Nationality: Norwegian
- Born: 22 May 1966 (age 60) Skien, Norway

Sport
- Sport: Handball
- Current club: Retired

Senior clubs
- Years: Team
- –: Larvik Turn
- –: Gjerpen IF
- 1999: Bækkelagets SK
National team
Years	Team	Apps	(Gls)
1984-?	Norway	110	(258)
Medal record
Representing Norway
Women's handball
Olympic Games
Silver medal – second place	1992 Barcelona	Team Competition
World Championship
Bronze medal – third place	1993 Norway
European Women's Handball Championship
Bronze medal – third place	1994 Germany

Siri Eftedal Seland (born 22 May 1966) is a Norwegian team handball player and Olympic medalist. She received a silver medal at the 1992 Summer Olympics in Barcelona with the Norwegian national team. She also won bronze medals at 1993 World Women's Handball Championship, and again at the inaugural European Championship in 1994. Siri Eftedal played 110 games for the national team during her career, scoring 258 goals.

She was awarded the Håndballstatuetten trophy from the Norwegian Handball Federation in 2013.
