= Cecilie Thorsteinsen =

Norwegian handball player (born 1974)

Personal information
- Full name: Cecilie Louise Thorsteinsen
- Nationality: Norwegian
- Born: January 7, 1974 (age 52)
- Height: 174 cm (69 in)

Sport
- Sport: Handball
- Position: Playmaker

Youth career
- Years: Team
- –: Rolvsøy IF
- –: Skjeberg IF

Senior clubs
- Years: Team
- –: Gjerpen IF
- 1997–1998: HV Swift Roermond
- 1999–2001: Randers HK
- 2001–2003: Nordstrand IF
- 2003–2004: Skjeberg IF
- 2004–2006: SønderjyskE
- 2006–2008: Flint Tønsberg
- 2009–2010: Gjerpen HK
National team
Years	Team	Apps	(Gls)
1994–2001	Norway	22	(50)

Cecilie Thorsteinsen (born 7 January 1974) is a Norwegian team handball player.

Thorsteinsen made her debut on the national team in 1994. She played 22 matches and scored 50 goals for the national team from 1994 to 2001. She played for the national team at the 2000 European Women's Handball Championship in Romania, when Norway finished 6th.

At club level she played in the Netherlands and Denmark.
