= Anne Migliosi =

Norwegian handball player (born 1965)

Personal information
- Full name: Anne Migliosi Taalesen
- Nationality: Norwegian
- Born: November 18, 1965 (age 60) Skien, Norway

Sport
- Sport: Handball
- Position: Right wing

Senior clubs
- Years: Team
- –: Gjerpen IF
National team
| Years | Team | Apps | (Gls) |
| 1984–1988 | Norway | 62 | (70) |
Medal record
Representing Norway
Women's handball
World championship
| Bronze medal – third place | 1986 Netherlands | Team |

Anne Migliosi Taalesen (born 19 November 1965) is a Norwegian team handball player from Skien. She played for the club Gjerpen IF and made her debut on the national team in 1984. She won a bronze medal at the 1986 World Women's Handball Championship.

Migliosi played 62 matches and scored 70 goals for the Norwegian national handball team between 1984 and 1988.

She played for Gjerpen IF, where she won the Norwegian Women's Handball Cup in 1985, 1986 and 1990.

== Private ==
Migliosi's parents are from Italy.
