= Patrycja Świerżewska =

Polish handball player (born 1996)

Personal information
- Nationality: Polish
- Born: 5 March 1996 (age 30) Warsaw, Poland
- Height: 1.77 m (5 ft 10 in)

Sport
- Sport: Handball
- Position: Centre back
- Current club: MKS Zagłębie Lubin
- Number: 77

Senior clubs
- Years: Team
- –2019: EB Start Elbląg
- 2019–2020: Byåsen HE
- 2020–: MKS Zagłębie Lubin
National team
Years	Team	Apps	(Gls)
–	Poland	13	(10)

Patrycja Świerżewska (born 5 March 1996) is a Polish handball player for MKS Zagłębie Lubin and the Polish national team.

She represented Poland at the 2020 European Women's Handball Championship.
