= Byåsen HE =

Norwegian handball club

Byåsen Håndball Elite
- Full name: Byåsen Håndball Elite
- Short name: Byåsen HE
- Founded: 1921
- Arena: Kolstad Arena, Trondheim
- Capacity: 2,500
- President: Mona Ulvin
- Head coach: Ane Mällberg
- League: REMA 1000-ligaen
- 2025–26: 9th
- Club colours
Home	Away

Byåsen Håndball Elite is the women's handball team of the Norwegian multi-sports club Byåsen IL based in Trondheim. The team plays in REMA 1000-ligaen, the top division in the country, since its promotion in 1982.

The team's first success came as a third division club, when in 1980 it won the silver medal in the national cup. Among its successes are four domestic league and four domestic cup titles, and the club also has a good reputation in the continental arena, having reached the latest stage of the European cup competitions, including the EHF Cup Winners' Cup final in 2007.

== Kits ==
HOME

2020-

== Honours ==
- REMA 1000-ligaen:
  - Winners: 1984/1985, 1985/1986, 1987/1988, 1988/1989
- Norwegian Cup:
  - Winners: 1988, 1989, 1991, 2007
  - Finalist: 2006, 2008, 2009
  - Bronze: 2022/2023
- EHF Cup Winners' Cup:
  - Finalist: 2006/2007

== Team ==
=== Current squad ===
Squad for the 2026–27 season

Goalkeeper

- 12 (Norway) Frida Molaup Selnes
- 16 (Norway) Andrea Austmo Pedersen (pregnant)
- 00 (Norway) Nora Aarnes Blomsøy

Wingers
RW

- 21 (Norway) Malin Smevik Dahl
- 27 (Norway) Emma Henden Foosnæs
- 00 (Norway) Arja Døsvik

LW

- 5 (Norway) Dina Salih
- 26 (Norway) Kristin Nordløkken Kounchou
- 00 (Norway) Hanna Blystad

Line players

- 4 (Norway) Mathilde Arnstad
- 13 (Norway) Helene Lovise Wesche-Rø
- 28 (Norway) Live Sønstebø

Back players
LB

- 3 (Norway) Ine Fremo
- 25 (Norway) Johanna Dahl Haugan
- 20 (Norway) Fride Mastad
- 00 (Norway) Madelen Nilsskog Johnsen

CB

- 18 (Norway) Marte Lausund Nornes
- 19 (Norway) Mathea Enger

RB

- 10 (Norway) Silje Waade
- 23 (Norway) Sofie Sandø Kleiven

=== Transfers ===
Transfers for the 2026–27 season

Joining

- (Norway) Thomas Engen (Head coach) (from (Norway) Follo HK Damer)
- (Norway) Nora Aarnes Blomsøy (GK) (from (from (Norway) Utleira HK)
- (Norway) Hanna Blystad (LW) (from (Norway) Fredrikstad BK)
- (Norway) Arja Døsvik (RW) (from (Norway) Levanger HK)
- (Norway) Madelen Nilsskog Johnsen (LB) (from (Norway) Trondheim Topphåndball)

Leaving

- (Norway) Ane Mällberg (Head coach)
- (Norway) Maren Austmo Pedersen (GK) (retires)
- (Norway) Pernille Rø (GK) (retires)
- (Norway) Janne Håvelsrud Eklo (CB) (to (Romania) SCM Craiova)
- (Denmark) Freja Vinther Christensen (LW) (to (Norway) Gjerpen Håndball)
- (Norway) Hedda Lauvås Aasen (RW) (to (Denmark) Nordvestjysk Elite)
- (Norway) Janne Thoresen Nordnes (P) (to (Norway) Gjerpen Håndball)

=== Technical staff ===
- Head coach: Thomas Engen
- Assistant coach: Kari Aalvik Grimsbø
- Assistant coach: Kai Aleksander Lindberg

=== Retired numbers ===
Byåsen Håndball Elite
No.	Player	Position	Tenure	Seasons
11	(Norway) Ida Alstad	Left/centre back	2001–2013, 2015–2016, 2016–2022	22

=== Notable former National Team players ===
- (Norway) Annette Skottvoll
- (Norway) Karin Pettersen
- (Norway) Mona Dahle
- (Norway) Ann-Cathrin Eriksen
- (Norway) Trine Haltvik
- (Norway) Kari Solem
- (Norway) Hege Kristine Kvitsand
- (Norway) Vigdis Hårsaker
- (Norway) Kjersti Beck
- (Norway) Elisabeth Hilmo
- (Norway) Terese Pedersen
- (Norway) Kari Aalvik Grimsbø
- (Norway) Camilla Herrem
- (Norway) Marit Malm Frafjord
- (Norway) Gøril Snorroeggen
- (Norway) Pernille Wibe
- (Norway) Mari Molid
- (Norway) Amanda Kurtovic
- (Norway) Maja Jakobsen
- (Norway) Tonje Nøstvold
- (Norway) Marta Tomac
- (Norway) Emilie Hegh Arntzen
- (Norway) Marit Røsberg Jacobsen
- (Norway) Silje Waade
- (Norway) Moa Högdahl
- (Norway) Andrea Austmo Pedersen
- (Norway) Maren Nyland Aardahl
- (Norway) Tuva Høve
- (Norway) Ida Alstad
- (Brazil) Barbara Arenhart
- (Croatia) Suzana Zuljani
- (Czech Republic) Iva Zamorska
- (Hungary) Rita Lakatos
- (Iceland) Helena Örvarsdóttir
- (Netherlands) Annick Lipman
- (Sweden) Mia Hermansson-Högdahl
- (Tunisia) Raja Toumi
- (Turkey) Yeliz Özel
- (Poland) Patrycja Świerżewska

=== Notable former club players ===
- (Norway) Kate Mogseth
- (Norway) Camilla Solberg
- (Norway) Beate Jonassen Grua
- (Norway) Ingrid Nygård Pedersen
- (Norway) Sissel Nygård Pedersen
- (Norway) Marthe Florholmen
- (Norway) Hilde Stavran Magnussen
- (Norway) Maren Villabø
- (Norway) Therese Henden
- (Norway) Marte Snorroeggen
- (Norway) Tonje Arnesen
- (Norway) Randi Aasarød
- (Norway) Nina Stokland
- (Norway) Kathrine Hjelmeland
- (Norway) Gina Lorentsen
- (Norway) Trine Kambuås
- (Norway) Guro Rundbråten
- (Norway) Hanna Yttereng
- (Norway) June Andenæs
- (Norway) Inga Berit Svestad
- (Norway) Maren Gundersen
- (Norway) Marie Henriksen
- (Norway) Maria Hjertner
- (Norway) Tonje Haug Lerstad
- (Norway) Kristin Venn
- (Norway) Ida Hernes
- (Norway) Oda Uthus
- (Norway) Maja Magnussen
- (Norway) Astrid Mjøen Holstad
- (Norway) Anna Bjørke Kallestad
- (Norway) Julie Bøe Jacobsen
- (Norway) Caroline Aar Jakobsen
- (Norway) Ida Marie Kallhovd
- (Norway) Marie Rokkones Hansen
- (Norway) Helle Kjellberg-Line
- (Norway) Sofie Riseth
- (Norway) Dina Klungtveit Olufsen
- (Norway) Anna Huse
- (Norway) Fride Heggdal Stølen
- (Norway) Mari Hvattum Cheetham
- (Norway) Emma Egge Edner
- (Norway) Aurora Kjellevold Hatle
- (Norway) Janne Håvelsrud Eklo
- (Norway) Hedda Lauvås Aasen
- (Croatia) Teodora Tomac
- (Denmark) Melanie Bak
- (Denmark) Sofie Winther-Hansen
- (Denmark) Freja Vinther Christensen

== Statistics ==
=== Top scorers in the EHF Champions League ===
Last updated on 2014

Rank	Name	Seasons played	Goals
1	(Norway) Camilla Herrem	8	167
2	(Norway) Tonje Nøstvold	3	70
3	(Norway) Vigdis Hårsaker	3	65
4	(Norway) Marit Malm Frafjord	3	59
5	(Norway) Ida Alstad	4	53
6	(Norway) Gøril Snorroeggen	3	42
7	(Tunisia) Raja Toumi	2	36
7	(Norway) Inga Berit Svestad	4	36
9	(Norway) Marte Snorroeggen	2	34
10	(Czech Republic) Iva Fialova	2	28

== European record ==
Season	Competition	Round	Club	1st leg	2nd leg	Aggregate
1995–96	EHF Cup Winners' Cup	1/16	(Slovenia) Branik Maribor	32–19	25–22	57–41
1995–96	EHF Cup Winners' Cup	1/8	(Iceland) Fram Reykjavik	30–14	27–18	57–32
1995–96	EHF Cup Winners' Cup	QF	(Ukraine) Spartak Kyiv	24–19	22–26	46–45
1995–96	EHF Cup Winners' Cup	SF	(Germany) TV Lützellinden	18–27	23–31	41–58
1996–97	EHF Champions League					
1996–97	EHF Champions League	QR	(Turkey) Anadolu	33–20	31–15	64–35
1996–97	EHF Champions League	Group C	(France) ASPTT Metz	17–16	23–17	2nd place
1996–97	EHF Champions League	Group C	(Romania) Oltchim Ramnicu Valcea	25–20	16–24	2nd place
1996–97	EHF Champions League	Group C	(Austria) Hypo Niederösterreich	16–20	17–20	2nd place
1996–97	EHF Champions League	QF	(Hungary) Ferencvárosi TC	20–20	21–26	41–46
1997–98	EHF Cup	1/8	(Netherlands) A.A.C. 1899 Huissen	33–17	32–13	65–30
1997–98	EHF Cup	QF	(Hungary) Dunaferr SE	24–23	19–35	43–58
1998–99	EHF Champions League					
1998–99	EHF Champions League	Round of 32	(Portugal) ACDF Madeira	36–18	40–20	76–38
1998–99	EHF Champions League	Group D	(Ukraine) HC Motor Zaporizhzhia	23–22	22–22	2nd place
1998–99	EHF Champions League	Group D	(Poland) Montex Lublin	24–20	28–25	2nd place
1998–99	EHF Champions League	Group D	(Denmark) Ikast	18–23	20–27	2nd place
1998–99	EHF Champions League	QF	(Austria) Hypo Niederösterreich	26–27	18–30	44–57
1999–00	EHF City Cup	1/16	(Austria) WAT Fünfhaus	35–17	30–9	65–26
1999–00	EHF City Cup	1/8	(Turkey) Türk Telekom Kulübü	38–20	28–26	66–46
1999–00	EHF City Cup	QF	(Poland) Zaglebie Lubin	35–25	28–23	63–48
1999–00	EHF City Cup	SF	(Denmark) Randers HK	26–22	21–27	47–49
2000–01	EHF Cup					
2004–05	EHF Cup					
2005–06	EHF Champions League					
2006–07	EHF Cup Winners' Cup; Finalist					
2007–08	EHF Cup					
2008–09	EHF Cup					
2009–10	EHF Champions League					
2010–11	EHF Cup Cup	R3	(Turkey) İzmir	29–25	29–19	58–44
2010–11	EHF Cup Cup	1/16	(Hungary) Váci NKSE	34–29	24–31	58–60
2011–12	EHF Cup Winners' Cup					
2012–13	EHF Cup Winners' Cup					
2013–14	EHF Cup Winners' Cup					
2014–15	EHF Cup Winners' Cup					
2016–17	EHF Cup	R1	(Slovenia) RK Zagorje	32–20	25–25	57–45
2016–17	EHF Cup	R2	(Norway) Tertnes HE	33–27	29–26	62–53
2016–17	EHF Cup	R3	(Romania) HC Dunărea Brăila	24–25	34–23	58–48
2016–17	EHF Cup	Group C	(Russia) Rostov-Don	29–24	21–35	4th place
2016–17	EHF Cup	Group C	(Germany) SG BBM Bietigheim	23–28	33–39	4th place
2016–17	EHF Cup	Group C	(Hungary) Érd NK	35–28	22–34	4th place
2017–18	EHF Cup	R1	(Poland) KRAM Start Elbląg	34–29	28–18	62–47
2017–18	EHF Cup	R2	(Romania) HC Dunărea Brăila	28–18	20–28	48–46
2017–18	EHF Cup	R3	(Belarus) HC Gomel	32–28	27–22	59–50
2017–18	EHF Cup	Group C	(Turkey) Kastamonu Belediyesi	28–30	26–24	3rd place
2017–18	EHF Cup	Group C	(Denmark) Viborg HK	21–28	26–29	3rd place
2017–18	EHF Cup	Group C	(Poland) Vistal Gdynia	24–22	41–19	3rd place
2018-19	EHF Cup	R2	(Norway) Storhamar HE	20–29	14–22	34–51
2019-20	EHF Cup	R1	(Luxembourg) Handball Käerjeng	40–13	46–12	86–25
2019-20	EHF Cup	R2	(Germany) Thüringer HC	25–29	24–29	49–58
2020-21	EHF European League	R3	(Poland) MKS Perła Lublin	0–10	0–10	(wo)

Incomplete
