= Inga Berit Svestad =

Norwegian handball player (born 1985)

Personal information
- Nationality: Norwegian
- Born: 28 June 1985 (age 41) Åndalsnes, Norway

Sport
- Sport: Handball
- Position: Right wing
- Current club: Retired

Senior clubs
- Years: Team
- –: Byåsen HE
National team
Years	Team	Apps	(Gls)
2009	Norway	13	(15)

Inga Berit Svestad (born 28 June 1985 in Åndalsnes) is a retired Norwegian handball player. She played for Byåsen HE, and on the Norwegian national team.

She made her debut on the Norwegian national team in 2009 in a match against Croatia, and played 13 matches and scored 15 goals for the national team in 2009. With the club Byåsen, she participated in the Women's EHF Champions League.
