= Celine Sivertsen =

Norwegian handball player (born 1993)

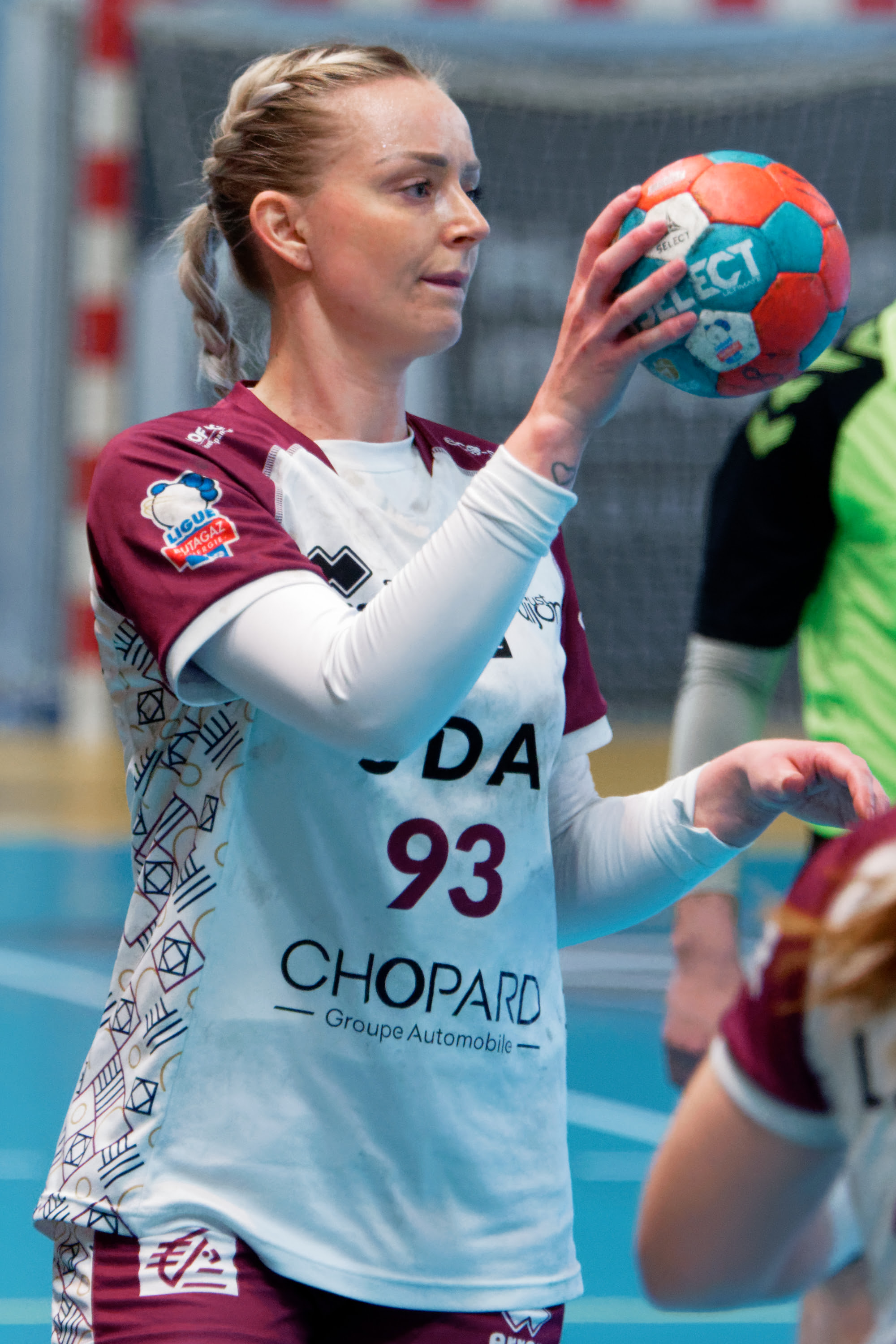
- Celine Sivertsen (2022)

Personal information
- Nationality: Norwegian
- Born: 20 April 1993 (age 33) Bergen, Norway
- Height: 1.77 m (5 ft 10 in)

Sport
- Sport: Handball
- Position: Right back
- Current club: Jeanne d'Arc Dijon Handball
- Number: 93

Youth career
- Years: Team
- –: Bjarg
- 2009–2012: Fana IL

Senior clubs
- Years: Team
- 2012–2014: Fana IL
- 2014–2018: Tertnes HE
- 2018–2020: Randers HK
- 2020–: Jeanne d'Arc Dijon Handball

Celine Sivertsen (born 20 April 1993) is a Norwegian handball player for Jeanne d'Arc Dijon Handball.
