= Mira Verås Larsen =

Norwegian canoe sprinter (born 1987)

Mira Verås Larsen (born 17 April 1987, Bærum) is a Norwegian canoe sprinter. She was selected to be Norway's flag-bearer at the 2012 Summer Olympics Parade of Nations.

== Personal life ==
Her great-grandfather won the first Norwegian Olympic gold in 1906 in team gymnastics. In 2011, she married fellow Olympic kayaker Eirik Verås Larsen.
