= Tonje Nøstvold =

Norwegian handball player (born 1985)

Personal information
- Nationality: Norwegian
- Born: 7 May 1985 (age 41) Stavanger, Norway
- Height: 1.78 m (5 ft 10 in)

Sport
- Sport: Handball
- Position: Right back
- Current club: Retired

Youth career
- Years: Team
- –: Hundvåg

Senior clubs
- Years: Team
- 2005: Sola HK
- 2005-2008: Byåsen IL
- 2008-2011: FC Midtjylland Håndbold
- 2011-2014: Byåsen IL
- 2016-2018: Sola HK
National team
| Years | Team | Apps | (Gls) |
| 2005–2014 | Norway | 183 | (408) |
Medal record
Olympic Games
| Gold medal – first place | 2008 Beijing | Team |
| Gold medal – first place | 2012 London | Team |
World Championship
| Silver medal – second place | 2007 France | Team |
| Bronze medal – third place | 2009 China | Team |
| Gold medal – first place | 2011 Brazil | Team |
European Championship
| Gold medal – first place | 2006 Sweden | Team |
| Gold medal – first place | 2008 Macedonia | Team |
| Gold medal – first place | 2010 Denmark/Norway | Team |

Tonje Nøstvold (born 7 May 1985) is a Norwegian handball player. She currently plays for Sola HK. Previous clubs includes Byåsen HE and FC Midtjylland Håndbold.

== Life and career ==
Born in Stavanger on 7 May 1985, Nøstvold started playing handball aged 7 at made Hundvåg. Her first senior club was Sola HK, where she played until 2005. She then joined Byåsen IL. Here she reached the final of the 2007 EHF Cup Winners' Cup, where they lost to Romanian CS Oltchim Râmnicu Vâlcea.

In 2008 she joined Danish side FC Midtjylland Håndbold, where she won the 2011 EHF Cup and Danish Championship.

In 2011 she returned to Byåsen on a three year deal.

She retired in November 2014, when she was pregnant at the time. In January 2016 she made a comeback for Sola HK.

She ultimately retired in 2018, due to a second pregnancy.

Today she is part of the coaching staff at Sola HK.

=== National team ===
She her debut on the Norwegian national team in 2005, and has played 183 matches and scored 408 goals. She was part of the Olympic gold medal-winning teams of 2008 and 2012. the World Championship winning team of 2011 and the European championship winning teams in 2006, 2008 and 2010.

She won a silver medal at the 2007 World Championship, and bronze medal at the 2009 World Championship with the Norwegian team. She also participated in the 2013 World Championship.

=== Awards and recognitions ===
Nøstvold was awarded the Håndballstatuetten trophy from the Norwegian Handball Federation in 2021.

== Private ==
Since 2018 she has been married to the football player Christoffer Midbøe Lunde.
