= Byåsen IL =

Norwegian sports club

Byåsen Idrettslag is a multi-sport club from Trondheim, Norway. It has sections for association football (one for elite, one for women's and one for grassroots football), athletics, handball (one for elite and one for grassroots handball), orienteering, Nordic skiing, and cycling.

== General history ==
The club was founded on 30 October 1921, and the three clubs Byåsen IL, Byåsen FK and Byåsen AIL later merged. The club colors are red and white.

== Handball ==
The club has two sections for handball, the elite section named Byåsen Håndball Elite and a grassroots section.

The women's handball team quickly became the flagship of Byåsen, when they in 1980 managed to qualify for the Norwegian Cup Final, as a Third Division team. The team has played in the highest league since 1984, and has won the top league five times (1986–87, 1987–88, 1989–90, 1995–96, 1997–98) and appeared in the cup final 14 times, winning four (1988, 1989, 1991 and 2007). Its main rival nationally is Larvik HK. Local rivals have included Sjetne IL and Selbu IL.

Former players include Ida Alstad, Camilla Herrem, Kari Aalvik Grimsbø, Trine Haltvik, Karin Pettersen, Ingrid Steen, Annette Skotvoll, Kari Solem, Mia Hermansson Högdahl, Marte Snorroeggen, Gøril Snorroeggen, Elisabeth Aaraas and Marit Breivik.

== Football ==
The elite section Byåsen Toppfotball is spearheaded by the men's team, which currently plays in the Norwegian Second Division, having last played in the First Division in 2001. The reserves team play in the Third Division.

The women's team plays in the Second Division.

== Skiing ==
The ski team is divided in two categories; cross-country skiing and ski jumping/Nordic combined.

Well-known cross-country skiers include Johannes Høsflot Klæbo, Tor Arne Hetland and Kristin Mürer Stemland. Biathletes Lars Berger and Ole Einar Bjørndalen, who participate in cross country skiing from time to time, are members as well. Nordic combined skiers include Magnus Moan and Petter Tande.

Well-known ski jumpers include Torbjørn Falkanger, Tommy Ingebrigtsen, Håvard Lie and Arve Vorvik.

The club has a local rival club in Byaasen SK, founded on 3 December 1893.

== Athletics and orienteering ==
Byåsen is an active athletics club. Their best athlete is Petter Hesselberg, who won the Norwegian championships in 110 metres hurdles in 1981 and 1983 and in 400 metres hurdles in 1981, 1982, 1983, 1984 and 1985. In the two events he also took nine silver medals and two bronze medals between 1977 and 1987. In the 1980s the club had good sprinters; the club won the Swedish relay at the 1983 national championships, and Kåre Magne Åmot took a 100 metres national silver in 1984. Roar Berg took a 200 metres national bronze in 1985, and became standing long jump champion in the same year. Jon Martin Denstadli won the standing long jump championships in 1991 and 1994 and took four other medals. Harald Lorentzen won a javelin throw bronze in 1983. Skier Kristin Mürer Stemland won a 5000 metres bronze at the national championships in Trondheim in 2008.

Well-known orienteers include Ellen Sofie Olsvik.
