= Kari Solem =

Norwegian handball player (born 1974)

Personal information
- Nationality: Norwegian
- Born: 1 December 1974 (age 51) Trondheim, Norway
- Height: 182 cm (72 in)

Sport
- Sport: Handball
- Position: Pivot

Senior clubs
- Years: Team
- 1991–1998: Byåsen IL
- 1998–1999: Borussia Dortmund
- 1999–2001: Byåsen IL
National team
- Years: Team
- –: Norway
Medal record
Representing Norway
Women's handball
World Championship
Silver medal – second place	1997 Germany	Team
European Championship
Silver medal – second place	1996 Denmark	Team
Bronze medal – third place	1994 Germany	Team

Kari Solem (born 1 December 1974) is a Norwegian handball player who played for the club Byåsen IL and the Norwegian national team in the 1990s. She was born in Trondheim. She competed at the 1996 Summer Olympics in Atlanta, where the Norwegian team finished fourth.

She won a bronze medal with the Norwegian team at the 1994 European Women's Handball Championship, silver medal at the 1996 European Women's Handball Championship, and siver medal at the 1997 World Women's Handball Championship.
