= Linn Jørum Sulland =

Norwegian handball player (born 1984)

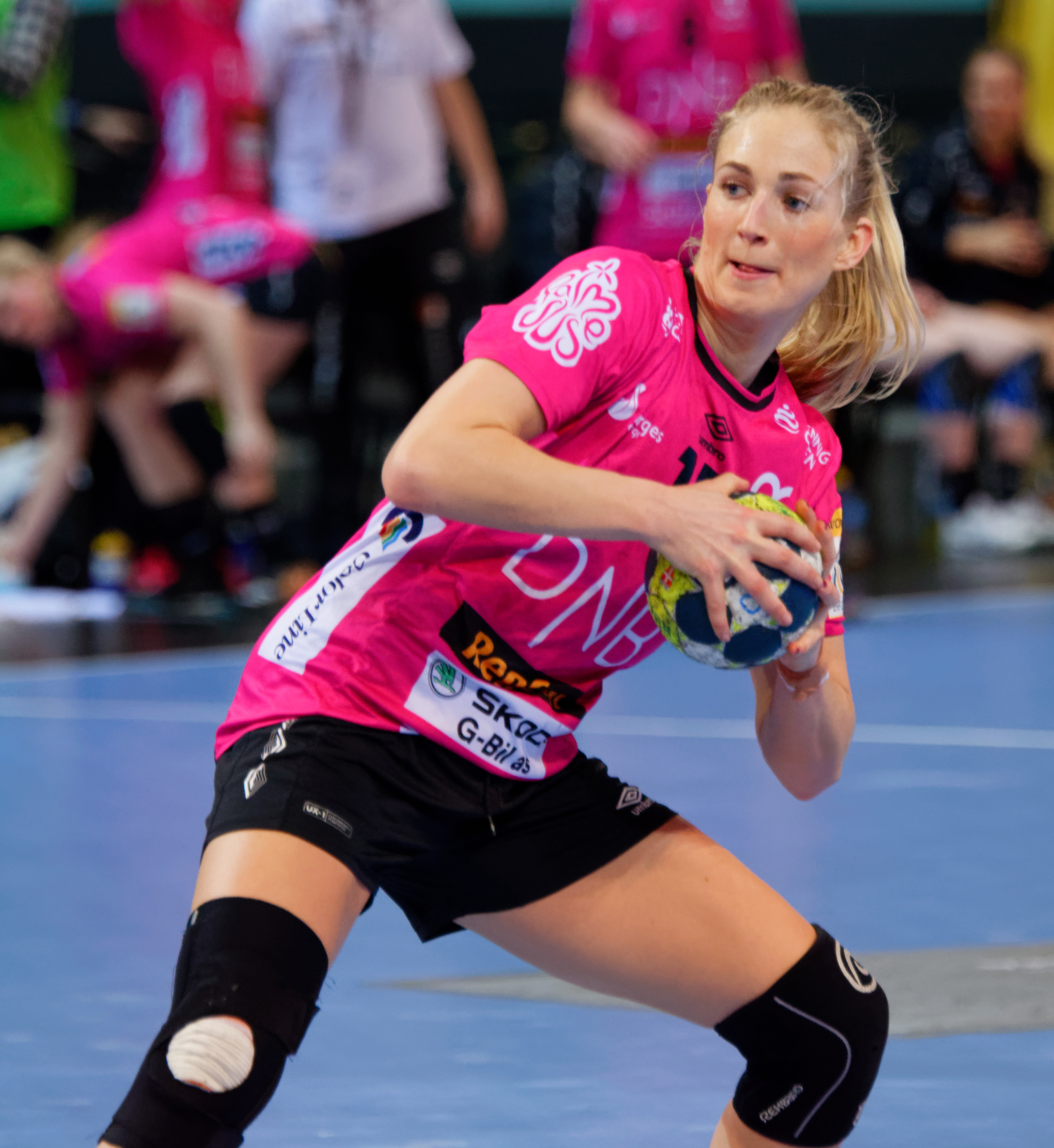
- Sulland in 2018

Personal information
- Nationality: Norwegian
- Born: 15 July 1984 (age 42) Oslo, Norway
- Height: 1.78 m (5 ft 10 in)

Sport
- Sport: Handball
- Position: Right back
- Current club: Retired

Senior clubs
- Years: Team
- 2000–2001: Korsvoll IL
- 2001–2009: Stabæk IF
- 2009–2015: Larvik HK
- 2015–2016: Győri ETO KC
- 2016–2021: Vipers Kristiansand
- 2022–2025: Oppsal
National team
Years	Team	Apps	(Gls)
2004–2018	Norway	193	(579)
Medal record
Olympic Games
Gold medal – first place	2012 London	Team
World Championship
Gold medal – first place	2011 Brazil
Gold medal – first place	2015 Denmark
Silver medal – second place	2007 France
European Championship
Gold medal – first place	2008 Macedonia
Gold medal – first place	2010 Denmark/Norway
Silver medal – second place	2012 Serbia

Linn Jørum Sulland (born 15 July 1984) is a retired Norwegian handball who last played for Oppsal and for the Norwegian national team.

She also played for Vipers Kristiansand, Győri ETO KC, Larvik HK and Stabæk IF.

== National team ==
=== Handball ===
Sulland played 14 matches for the Norwegian youth national team and won a bronze medal at the youth World Championship.

She made her debut on the Norwegian national team on 26 March 2004.

When Linn-Kristin Riegelhuth Koren and Vigdis Hårsaker both were injured for the 2005 World Championship, Sulland was called up to replace them. Norway finished 9th in the tournament.

She was not called up for the 2006 European Championship, but was in the team once again for the 2007 World Championship, where Norway finished 2nd.

In the following years, Sulland was often overlooked for the Norwegian National team, and she did not participate in neither the 2008 Olympics nor the 2009 World Championship. She did however play at the 2008 European Championship, where Norway won the title. Sulland acted primarily as a substitute during the tournament.

At the 2010 European Championship Sulland was not nominated for the national team from the start, but entered the team at the semifinals. Norway defended their title, winning against Sweden in the final.

From 2011 forwards Sulland became a more stable feature in the Norwegian national team. At the 2011 World Championship she was second in the top scorer list with 51 goals. Norway won the title. At the 2012 Olympics in London she won gold medals with the Norwegian team. Sulland scored 10 goals in the final against Montenegro.

Later the same year Norway finished second at the 2012 European Championship, losing to Montenegro in the final.

At the 2013 World Women's Handball Championship Norway exited in the quarter final. Sulland scored 24 goals in 7 games.

Due to a broken foot, she missed the 2014 European Championship.

A year later she was back in the Norwegian national team that won the 2015 World Championship.

From June 2016 she was out of the Norwegian national team, but made a return in November 2018. She then played at the 2018 European Championship, where Norway finished 5th. Sulland scored 20 goals during the tournament.

=== Beach handball ===
Linn Sulland received a bronze medal at the 2007 European Beach Handball Championship, where she was also the tournament's top scorer. In 2009, she was part of the team that won a silver medal at the European Championship in Larvik.

== Club career ==
=== Early career ===
Sulland started playing handball at Korsvoll IL and joined Stabæk Håndball in 2001. She started in the Stabæk youth team, and by her second season at the club she was part of the first team, where she played 22 matches during the 2002-23 season.

Sulland was top scorer in the Norwegian league in the 2005/2006 season (shared top position with Linn-Kristin Riegelhuth, 159 goals), as well as player of the year (Norwegian: Årets spiller) and best right back of the year (Norwegian: Årets høyre bakspiller).

=== Larvik ===
In 2009 she joined Larvik HK. Here she won the Norwegian championship in her first season. In the second season she won the 2010-11 Champions League. Scoring 10 goals in the final, Sulland played a crucial role in the victory. The following four seasons, she won 4 additional Norwegian championships.

=== Győr ===
For the 2015-16 season she joined Hungarian Győri ETO KC. Here she won both the Hungarian championship and cup in her first season.

=== Vipers ===
She then returned to Norway and joined Vipers Kristiansand. Here she reached the final of the 2017-18 EHF Cup, where they lost to Romanian SCM Craiova. A year later she finished third in the 2018-19 Champions League and was the top scorer of the tournament.

She retired after the 2020-21 season. In the very last game of her professional career she won the 2020-21 Champions League with Vipers. This was the first time Vipers had won the tournament, and only the second time a Norwegian team had won it.

=== Oppsal ===
In the 2022-23 she came out of retirement to join the 2nd tier team Oppsal IF, where she was a part of the coaching staff. In the 2023-24 season she retired again due to pregnancy, but made a second comeback in February 2024. By the time Oppsal IF had been promoted to the top Norwegian league.

== Coaching career ==
For the 2022-23 season she became the fitness coach of Oppsal IF.

== Achievements ==
=== National team ===
- Olympic Games:
  - Winner: 2012
- World Championship:
  - Winner: 2011, 2015
  - Silver Medalist: 2007
- European Championship:
  - Winner: 2008, 2010
  - Silver Medalist: 2012

=== European competitions ===
- EHF Champions League:
  - Winner: 2011, 2021
  - Finalist: 2013, 2015, 2016
  - Bronze Medalist: 2019
  - Semifinalist: 2010, 2012
- EHF Cup:
  - Finalist: 2018

=== Domestic competitions ===
- Norwegian Championship:
  - Winner: 2010, 2011, 2012, 2013, 2014, 2015, 2017/2018, 2018/2019, 2019/2020, 2020/2021
  - Silver Medalist: 2016/2017
- Norwegian Cup:
  - Winner: 2010, 2011, 2012, 2013, 2014, 2015, 2017, 2018, 2019, 2020
- Hungarian Championship:
  - Winner: 2016
- Hungarian Cup:
  - Winner: 2016

== Individual awards ==
- All-Star Right Back of Eliteserien: 2018/2019
- Eliteserien Top Scorer: 2006, 2018
- EHF Cup Top Scorer: 2018
- All-Star Right Back of the Møbelringen Cup: 2018
- EHF Champions League: Topscorer 2018/2019 (89 goals)
