= Maria Hjertner =

Norwegian handball player (born 1996)

Personal information
- Nationality: Norwegian
- Born: 3 July 1996 (age 30) Trondheim, Norway
- Height: 1.78 m (5 ft 10 in)

Sport
- Sport: Handball
- Position: Right back
- Current club: Byåsen HE

Senior clubs
- Years: Team
- –2014: Selbu IL
- 2014–2017: Byåsen HE
- 2017–2019: Larvik HK
- 2019–2022: København Håndbold
- 2022–: Byåsen HE

Maria Hjertner (born 3 July 1996) is a Norwegian handball player who plays for Byåsen HE.

She is also a part of Norway's national recruit team in handball.

She also represented Norway at the 2014 Women's Youth World Handball Championship, placing 13th, at the 2015 European Women's U-19 Handball Championship, placing 6th and at the 2013 Youth European Championship, placing 7th.

She played for Danish club København Håndbold between 2019 and 2022.
