= Ida Alstad =

Norwegian handball player (born 1985)

Personal information
- Born: 13 June 1985 (age 41) Trondheim, Norway
- Height: 1.72 m (5 ft 8 in)

Sport
- Sport: Handball
- Position: Left/centre back

Senior clubs
- Years: Team
- 2001–2013: Byåsen HE
- 2013–2014: Team Tvis Holstebro
- 2014–2015: FC Midtjylland
- 2015–2016: Byåsen HE
- 2016: Győri ETO KC
- 2016–2022: Byåsen HE
National team
| Years | Team | Apps | (Gls) |
| 2009–2016 | Norway | 143 | (310) |
Medal record
Olympic Games
| Gold medal – first place | 2012 London | Team |
| Bronze medal – third place | 2016 Rio de Janeiro | Team |
World Championship
| Gold medal – first place | 2011 Brazil |
| Gold medal – first place | 2015 Denmark |
| Bronze medal – third place | 2009 China |
European Championship
| Gold medal – first place | 2010 Denmark/Norway |
| Gold medal – first place | 2014 Croatia/Hungary |
| Silver medal – second place | 2012 Serbia |

Ida Alstad (born 13 June 1985) is a retired Norwegian handball player, who played most of her career for Byåsen HE, in addition to seven years on the Norway women's national handball team.

== Career ==
Alstad started her career at Byåsen HE. In the 2006–07 season she reached the final of the EHF Cup Winners' Cup, where they lost to Romanian CS Oltchim Râmnicu Vâlcea.

In 2013 she joined Danish side Team Tvis Holstebro. A year later she joined league rivals FC Midtjylland Håndbold. Here she won the 2015 Danish Championship, the 2014 Danish cup, and the 2015 EHF Cup Winners' Cup. In the final of the Danish cup she ruptured her achilles which kept her out for the rest of the season.

In the summer of 2015 she returned to Byåsen HE. Only 6 months later she joined Hungarian top team Győri ETO KC on loan, as they were struggling with injuries. Here she won the 2016 Hungarian Championship and cup and reached the semifinal of the EHF Champions League.

The following summer she would return to Byåsen HE for a third time.

In the 2017–18 season she took a break from handball due to pregnancy leave. In December 2019 she was away as well with a cruciate ligament injury.

After the 2021–22 season she retired from handball. However, only 5 games into the 2022–23 season, she came back to the court at Byåsen.

=== National team ===
She made her debut on the Norwegian national team in 2009.

At the 2009 World Women's Handball Championship she won bronze medals with the Norwegian team. A year later she won the 2010 European Championship.

In 2011 she won the 2011 World Championship, followed by Gold at the 2012 Olympics.

She also represented Norway at the 2013 World Championship. At the 2014 European Championship she won her second European gold.

At the 2015 World Championship she won her second World Championship gold. She was not initially part of the team, and was only included during the tournament to replace the injured Mari Molid.

At the 2016 Olympics she won bronze medals with the Norwegian team, losing to Russia in the semifinals in extra time and beating Netherlands in the third place playoff.

== Achievements ==
- Olympic Games:
  - Winner: 2012
  - Bronze Medalist: 2016
- World Championship:
  - Winner: 2011, 2015
  - Bronze Medalist: 2009
- European Championship:
  - Winner: 2010, 2014
  - Silver Medalist: 2012
- EHF Champions League:
  - Finalist: 2015/2016
- EHF Cup Winners' Cup:
  - Winner: 2014/2015
  - Finalist: 2006/2007
- Hungarian League:
  - Winner: 2015/2016
- Norwegian Cup:
  - Winner: 2007
  - Finalist: 2006, 2008, 2009
- Danish Cup:
  - Winner: 2014
- Hungarian Cup:
  - Winner: 2016

== Individual awards ==
- All-Star Centre Back of Eliteserien: 2008/2009

== Personal life ==
Alstad was born in Trondheim on 13 June 1985.

Gave birth to her first child on 30 December 2017, and came back on the handball court spring 2018 for Byåsen HE.
