= Kari Aalvik Grimsbø =

Norwegian handball player (born 1985)

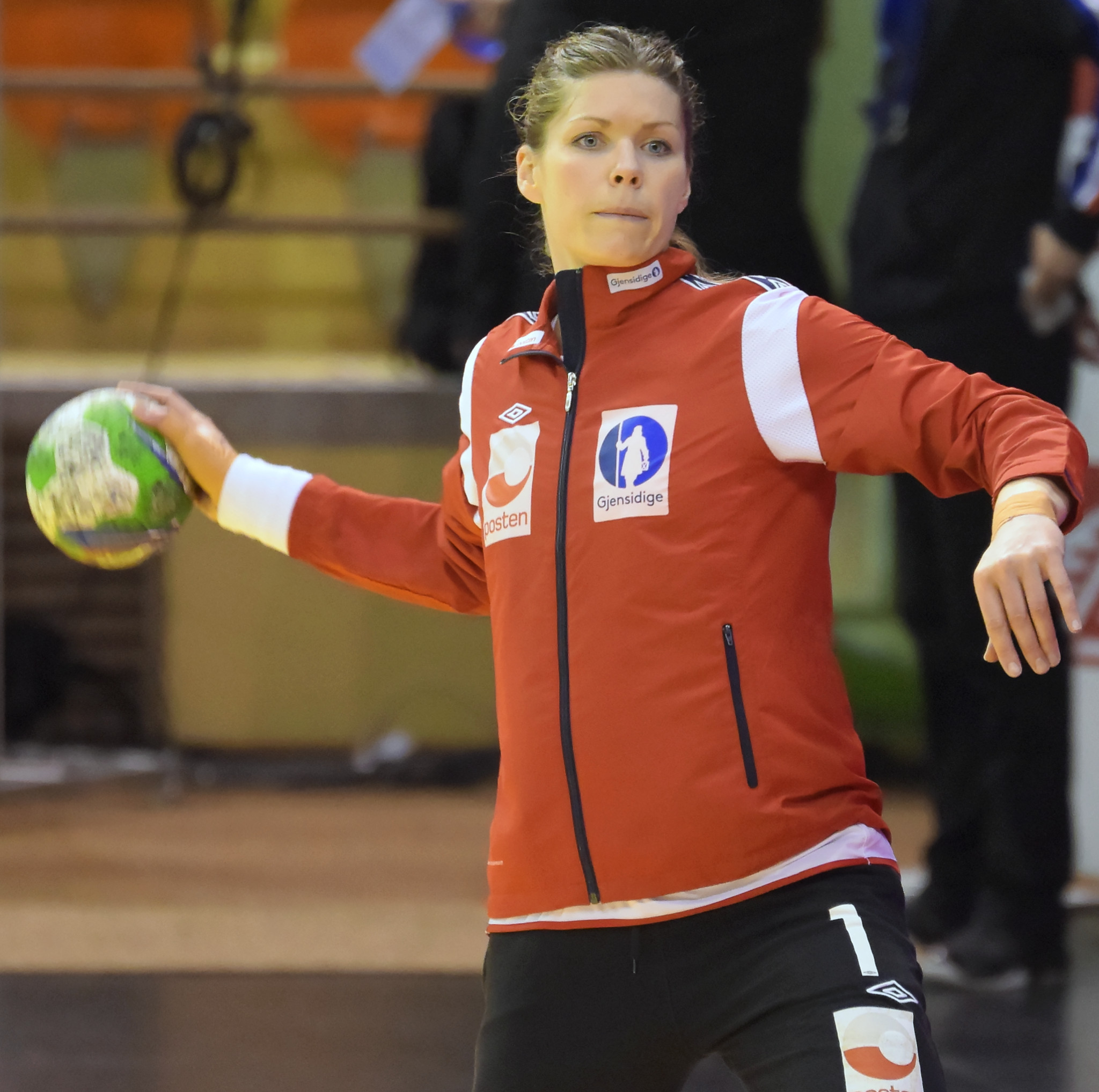

Personal information
- Nationality: Norwegian
- Born: 4 January 1985 (age 41) Bergen, Norway
- Height: 1.80 m (5 ft 11 in)

Sport
- Sport: Handball
- Position: Goalkeeper

Senior clubs
- Years: Team
- –: Orkdal IL
- –: Skaun HK
- –2010: Byåsen IL
- 2010–2014/2015: Team Esbjerg
- 2014/2015–2020: Győri ETO KC
National team
Years	Team	Apps	(Gls)
2005–2018	Norway	173	(1)
Medal record
Olympic Games
Gold medal – first place	2008 Beijing	Team
Gold medal – first place	2012 London	Team
Bronze medal – third place	2016 Rio de Janeiro	Team
World Championship
Gold medal – first place	2011 Brazil
Gold medal – first place	2015 Denmark
Silver medal – second place	2007 France
Silver medal – second place	2017 Germany
Bronze medal – third place	2009 China
European Championship
Gold medal – first place	2006 Sweden
Gold medal – first place	2008 Macedonia
Gold medal – first place	2010 Denmark/Norway
Gold medal – first place	2014 Croatia/Hungary
Gold medal – first place	2016 Sweden

Kari Aalvik Grimsbø (born 4 January 1985) is a former Norwegian handball player who last played for Győri ETO KC and the Norwegian national team. She is both an Olympic, European and World Champion. Since her retirement she is the goalkeeping coach at Byåsen HE.

== Career ==
Aalvik Grimsbø played her first match for the senior national team in September 2005 against Portugal. Previously she had played for Norway in the junior European and World Championships.

Grimsbø started playing handball aged 5 at Børsa/Skaun. Before she joined Byåsen, she played for the clubs Orkdal. In 2010 she joined Danish side Team Esbjerg. In 2012 she took a break from handball due to maternity leave, and was replaced by Rikke Petersen-Schmidt who came out of retirement to join Team Esbjerg.

She joined to Győri ETO in January 2015, she signed a contract for 2 and a half years. As she stated about the contract: "It is a great opportunity for me, and when such an opportunity arises, it is hard to say no. It’s a dream coming true." In November 2016 she extended her contract with 3 more years. "There is a great team in Győr at the moment, I'm glad, that I can play here for at least three more years. It is really important for me, that I can play at the highest level with Győri ETO and I can prepare for the 2020 Olympic Games." With Gyor she won the 2015, 2016, 2018 und 2019 Hungarian Cup, the 2016, 2017, 2018 und 2019 Hungarian Championship and the 2017, 2018 and 2019 EHF Women's Champions League.

In 2018 she announced her temporary retirement from the Norwegian national team. For the qualification games to the 2020 Summer Olympics, her return to the national team was announced on Feb 28, 2020. On 30 April 2020, she announced her retirement.

== Achievements ==
- Olympic Games:
  - Winner: 2008, 2012
  - Bronze Medalist: 2016
- World Championship:
  - Winner: 2011, 2015
  - Silver Medalist: 2007, 2017
  - Bronze Medalist: 2009
- European Championship:
  - Winner: 2006, 2008, 2010, 2014, 2016
- EHF Champions League:
  - Winner: 2017, 2018, 2019
  - Silver Medalist: 2016
- Nemzeti Bajnokság I
  - Winner: 2016, 2017, 2018, 2019
- Magyar Kupa
  - Winner: 2015, 2016, 2018, 2019

== Individual awards ==
- All-Star Goalkeeper of the Summer Olympics: 2012 and 2016
- All-Star Team Best Goalkeeper of the EHF Champions League: 2016, 2017, 2018
- MVP of the EHF Champions League Final Four: 2019

== Personal ==
She is married. She gave birth to her son, Sindre in June 2013.
