= Gjerpen IF =

Norwegian sports club

Gjerpen Idrettsforening is a sports club in Skien, Norway. It was founded in 1918. Among the club's activities are handball, skiing and athletics. In handball the club's women's team has won the National championships several times. Notable players are Kjerstin Andersen, Hanne Hegh and Siri Eftedal.

== Handball ==
The women's handball team currently compete in REMA 1000-ligaen, since their promotion in 2023.

=== Current squad ===
Squad for the 2026–27 season

Goalkeeper

- 1 (Norway) Vilde Amalie Klaussen
- 12 (Norway) Liv Tvedte Johannessen
- 16 (Norway) Mia Tvedte Johannessen
- 29 (Denmark) Anna Vinther Veng Kristensen

Wingers
LW

- 22 (Denmark) Freja Vinther Christensen
- 25 (Norway) Tania Maria Taran
- 34 (Norway) Sofie Plich

RW

- 10 (Norway) Caroline Wikheim Aas
- 14 (Norway) Karoline Helle Nilsen
- 19 (Norway) Louisa Abigail Jonsaas Sargeant

Line players

- 11 (Norway) Mia Horgøien
- 17 (Norway) Janne Thoresen Nordnes
- 33 (Norway) Heidi Bildøy Østvold

Back players
LB

- 2 (Norway) Oda Olsen
- 3 (Norway) Emilie Bech
- 4 (Norway) Lea Tidemann Stenvik
- 5 (Norway) Sofie Donna Aasland Lae
- 6 (Norway) Oda Jeanette Burhol
- 9 (Norway) Hedda Skjelbreid Rønningen
- 13 (Norway) Viktoria Odinokova Eilertsen
- 18 (Norway) Anne Malin Antonsen
- 43 (Norway) Kjersti Vinjevoll
- 00 (Norway) Ane Engan Haugen

CB

- 21 (Denmark) Sofie Lundsgaard Jørgensen

RB

- 15 (Sweden) Lova Ekengren
- 20 (Norway) Mia Syverud

=== Transfers ===
Transfers for the 2026–27 season.

Joining

- (Norway) Birgitte Sættem (Assistant coach)
- (Denmark) Anna Vinther Veng Kristensen (GK) (from (Denmark) Silkeborg-Voel KFUM)
- (Norway) Liv Tvedte Johannessen (GK) (from own rows)
- (Denmark) Freja Vinther Christensen (LW) (from (Norway) Byåsen HE)
- (Norway) Sofie Plich (LW) (from own rows)
- (Norway) Tania Maria Taran (LW) (from (Norway) Flint Tønsberg)
- (Norway) Emilie Bech (LB) (from (Norway) Glassverket IF)
- (Norway) Sofie Donna Aasland Lae (LB) (from (Norway) Aker Topphåndball)
- (Norway) Kjersti Vinjevoll (LB) (from own rows)
- (Norway) Ane Engan Haugen (LB) (from (Norway) Romerike Ravens)
- (Denmark) Sofie Lundsgaard Jørgensen (CB) (from (Denmark) Nykøbing Falster Håndboldklub)
- (Sweden) Lova Ekengren (RB) (from (Sweden) OV Helsingborg)
- (Norway) Mia Syverud (RB) (from (Iceland) Selfoss)
- (Norway) Karoline Helle Nilsen (RW) (from (Norway) Grane Arendal)
- (Norway) Louisa Abigail Jonsaas Sargeant (RW) (from (Norway) Herkules Skien)
- (Norway) Janne Thoresen Nordnes (P) (from (Norway) Byåsen HE)

Leaving

- (Norway) Mia Stensland (GK) (to (Norway) Storhamar HE)
- (Norway) Hannah Kjelstad Høsøien (LB) (to (Norway) Larvik HK)
- (Norway) Ingeborg Rolseth Holt (CB) (to (Norway) Tertnes HE)
- (Norway) Oda Kongssund (LB) (studies)
- (Norway) Linn Andresen (CB) (to (Sweden) Kristianstad HK)
- (Norway) Maja Rame (LW) (studies)
- (Norway) Ingvild Bersås Westersjø (P) (to (Norway) Tertnes HE)

=== Technical staff ===
- Head coach: Pål Oldrup Jensen
- Assistant coach: Per Magnus Boman

=== Notable former national team players ===
- (Norway) Kjerstin Andersen
- (Norway) Hanne Hegh
- (Norway) Siri Eftedal
- (Norway) Anne Migliosi
- (Norway) Jeanette Nilsen
- (Norway) Cecilie Thorsteinsen
- (Norway) Heidi Løke
- (Norway) Anja Hammerseng-Edin
- (Norway) Emilie Hegh Arntzen
- (Norway) Mia Hundvin
- (Norway) Camilla Thorsen
- (Tunisia) Raja Toumi
- (Denmark) Melanie Bak
- (Denmark) Pernille Fisker

=== Notable former club players ===
- (Norway) Gro Knutsen
- (Norway) Janne Grimholt
- (Norway) Hanne-Stine Bratli
- (Czech Republic) Iva Zamorska
- (Czech Republic) Erika Polozova
- (Sweden) Karin Nilsson
- (Norway) Tina Bjerke
- (Norway) Randi Aasarød
- (Norway) Kari-Anne Solfjeld Eid
- (Norway) Brigitte Myklebust
- (Norway) Renate Saastad Sømme
- (Norway) Tiril Jørstad Palm
- (Norway) Annika Skrettingland
- (Norway) Vilde Bjørnsen
- (Norway) Fride Lunne Mastad
- (Norway) Mia Stensland
- (Norway) Hannah Kjelstad Høsøien
- (Norway) Ingeborg Rolseth Holt
- (Norway) Oda Kongssund
- (Norway) Linn Andresen
- (Norway) Maja Rame
- (Norway) Ingvild Bersås Westersjø
