= 2017–18 Women's EHF Cup group stage =

European handball tournament group stage

This article describes the group stage of the 2017–18 Women's EHF Cup, a women's handball competition.

== Draw ==
The draw was held on 23 November 2017.

=== Seedings ===
The seedings were announced on 23 November 2017.

Pot 1	Pot 2	Pot 3	Pot 4
(France) Brest Bretagne Handball (Norway) Larvik HK (Norway) Vipers Kristiansand (Poland) Vistal Gdynia	(Denmark) Randers HK (Denmark) Viborg HK (Russia) Lada (Sweden) H 65 Höör	(France) Issy Paris Hand (Norway) Byåsen Håndball Elite (Romania) SCM Craiova (Romania) HC Zalău	(Czech Republic) DHK Baník Most (Denmark) København Håndbold (Russia) Kuban (Turkey) Kastamonu Belediyesi

== Groups ==
The matchdays were 5–7 January, 12–14 January, 20–21 January, 27–28 January, 3–4 February and 10–11 February 2018.

=== Group A ===
Pos	Team	Pld	W	D	L	GF	GA	GD	Pts	Qualification
1	(France) Brest Bretagne Handball	6	4	0	2	139	117	+22	8 (Note: Brest Bretagne Handball HC 40–38 SCM Craiova)	Quarterfinals
2	(Romania) SCM Craiova	6	4	0	2	146	134	+12	8	Quarterfinals
3	(Russia) Kuban	6	3	0	3	141	155	−14	6	
4	(Denmark) Randers HK	6	1	0	5	124	144	−20	2	

Source: EHF
Rules for classification: See Tiebreakers
Notes:

7 January 2018; 17:00	Brest Bretagne Handball (France)	25–22	(Romania) SCM Craiova	Brest Arena, Brest; Attendance: 3,024; Referees: Schols, Thomassen (NED)
7 January 2018; 17:00	Coatanea, Stoiljković 5	(13–10)	Florianu 7	Brest Arena, Brest; Attendance: 3,024; Referees: Schols, Thomassen (NED)
7 January 2018; 17:00	3× (yellow card) 2× (suspension)	Report	3× (yellow card) 1× (suspension)	Brest Arena, Brest; Attendance: 3,024; Referees: Schols, Thomassen (NED)

7 January 2018; 19:30	Randers HK (Denmark)	20–23	(Russia) Kuban	Arena Randers, Randers; Attendance: 979; Referees: Sa, Sa (POR)
7 January 2018; 19:30	Andersen 4	(10–11)	Frolova, Gariaeva 4	Arena Randers, Randers; Attendance: 979; Referees: Sa, Sa (POR)
7 January 2018; 19:30	2× (yellow card) 2× (suspension)	Report	2× (yellow card) 3× (suspension)	Arena Randers, Randers; Attendance: 979; Referees: Sa, Sa (POR)

13 January 2018; 18:00	SCM Craiova (Romania)	23–17	(Denmark) Randers HK	Polyvalent Hall, Craiova; Attendance: 3,600; Referees: Pech, Vagvölgyi (HUN)
13 January 2018; 18:00	Florianu 6	(16–6)	Molid 7	Polyvalent Hall, Craiova; Attendance: 3,600; Referees: Pech, Vagvölgyi (HUN)
13 January 2018; 18:00	3× (yellow card) 4× (suspension)	Report	3× (yellow card) 5× (suspension)	Polyvalent Hall, Craiova; Attendance: 3,600; Referees: Pech, Vagvölgyi (HUN)

14 January 2018; 16:00	Kuban (Russia)	22–28	(France) Brest Bretagne Handball	Olympus Arena, Krasnodar; Attendance: 1,800; Referees: Chrzan, Janas (POL)
14 January 2018; 16:00	Arishina 5	(12–13)	Pineau 7	Olympus Arena, Krasnodar; Attendance: 1,800; Referees: Chrzan, Janas (POL)
14 January 2018; 16:00	3× (yellow card) 3× (suspension)	Report	2× (yellow card) 1× (suspension)	Olympus Arena, Krasnodar; Attendance: 1,800; Referees: Chrzan, Janas (POL)

20 January 2018; 14:00	Randers HK (Denmark)	26–18	(France) Brest Bretagne Handball	Arena Randers, Randers; Attendance: 609; Referees: Korja, Metsämäki (FIN)
20 January 2018; 14:00	Molid 6	(13–11)	N'Gouan 4	Arena Randers, Randers; Attendance: 609; Referees: Korja, Metsämäki (FIN)
20 January 2018; 14:00	1× (yellow card) 1× (suspension)	Report	3× (yellow card) 1× (suspension)	Arena Randers, Randers; Attendance: 609; Referees: Korja, Metsämäki (FIN)

21 January 2018; 16:00	Kuban (Russia)	28–26	(Romania) SCM Craiova	Olympus Arena, Krasnodar; Attendance: 1,600; Referees: Aghakishi, Aghakishi (AZE)
21 January 2018; 16:00	Arishina 6	(12–12)	five players 4	Olympus Arena, Krasnodar; Attendance: 1,600; Referees: Aghakishi, Aghakishi (AZE)
21 January 2018; 16:00	2× (yellow card) 3× (suspension)	Report	2× (yellow card) 5× (suspension)	Olympus Arena, Krasnodar; Attendance: 1,600; Referees: Aghakishi, Aghakishi (AZE)

27 January 2018; 16:30	SCM Craiova (Romania)	30–24	(Russia) Kuban	Polyvalent Hall, Craiova; Attendance: 3,800; Referees: Mertinian, Syrepisios (GRE)
27 January 2018; 16:30	Florianu 10	(17–13)	Frolova 8	Polyvalent Hall, Craiova; Attendance: 3,800; Referees: Mertinian, Syrepisios (GRE)
27 January 2018; 16:30	3× (yellow card) 5× (suspension)	Report	3× (yellow card) 4× (suspension)	Polyvalent Hall, Craiova; Attendance: 3,800; Referees: Mertinian, Syrepisios (GRE)

28 January 2018; 17:00	Brest Bretagne Handball (France)	23–15	(Denmark) Randers HK	Brest Arena, Brest; Attendance: 3,666; Referees: Rosendo, Rodriguez Estevez (ESP)
28 January 2018; 17:00	Sand 7	(9–10)	Thorngaard 4	Brest Arena, Brest; Attendance: 3,666; Referees: Rosendo, Rodriguez Estevez (ESP)
28 January 2018; 17:00	1× (yellow card) 2× (suspension)	Report	2× (yellow card) 3× (suspension)	Brest Arena, Brest; Attendance: 3,666; Referees: Rosendo, Rodriguez Estevez (ESP)

3 February 2018; 18:00	SCM Craiova (Romania)	16–15	(France) Brest Bretagne Handball	Polyvalent Hall, Craiova; Attendance: 4,000; Referees: Hajek, Macho (CZE)
3 February 2018; 18:00	Klikovac, Vizitiu 3	(5–9)	Pineau 6	Polyvalent Hall, Craiova; Attendance: 4,000; Referees: Hajek, Macho (CZE)
3 February 2018; 18:00	2× (yellow card) 1× (suspension)	Report	3× (yellow card) 4× (suspension)	Polyvalent Hall, Craiova; Attendance: 4,000; Referees: Hajek, Macho (CZE)

4 February 2018; 16:00	Kuban (Russia)	28–21	(Denmark) Randers HK	Olympus Arena, Krasnodar; Attendance: 1,800; Referees: Jovic, Arnautovic (BIH)
4 February 2018; 16:00	Golub 7	(12–8)	Andersen 4	Olympus Arena, Krasnodar; Attendance: 1,800; Referees: Jovic, Arnautovic (BIH)
4 February 2018; 16:00	3× (yellow card) 3× (suspension)	Report	3× (yellow card) 4× (suspension)	Olympus Arena, Krasnodar; Attendance: 1,800; Referees: Jovic, Arnautovic (BIH)

11 February 2018; 14:00	Randers HK (Denmark)	25–29	(Romania) SCM Craiova	Arena Randers, Randers; Attendance: 710; Referees: Ben-Dan, Faran (ISR)
11 February 2018; 14:00	Molid 7	(14–17)	Florianu, Vizitiu 7	Arena Randers, Randers; Attendance: 710; Referees: Ben-Dan, Faran (ISR)
11 February 2018; 14:00	3× (yellow card) 2× (suspension)	Report	2× (yellow card) 6× (suspension)	Arena Randers, Randers; Attendance: 710; Referees: Ben-Dan, Faran (ISR)

11 February 2017; 15:00	Brest Bretagne Handball (France)	30–16	(Russia) Kuban	Brest Arena, Brest; Attendance: 3,919; Referees: Merz, Schilha (GER)
11 February 2017; 15:00	Coatanea, Tissier 5	(12–9)	Golub 4	Brest Arena, Brest; Attendance: 3,919; Referees: Merz, Schilha (GER)
11 February 2017; 15:00	1× (yellow card) 6× (suspension)	Report	3× (yellow card) 3× (suspension)	Brest Arena, Brest; Attendance: 3,919; Referees: Merz, Schilha (GER)

=== Group B ===
Pos	Team	Pld	W	D	L	GF	GA	GD	Pts	Qualification
1	(Russia) Lada	6	5	0	1	160	147	+13	10	Quarterfinals
2	(Norway) Vipers Kristiansand	6	3	0	3	156	150	+6	6	Quarterfinals
3	(France) Issy Paris Hand	6	2	1	3	146	156	−10	5	
4	(Denmark) København Håndbold	6	1	1	4	162	171	−9	3	

Source: EHF
Rules for classification: See Tiebreakers

6 January 2018; 16:00	Lada (Russia)	27–24	(Denmark) København Håndbold	Olymp Sportkomplex, Togliatti; Attendance: 2,500; Referees: Hatipoglu, Simsek (TUR)
6 January 2018; 16:00	Vedekhina 7	(12–14)	Nielsen 6	Olymp Sportkomplex, Togliatti; Attendance: 2,500; Referees: Hatipoglu, Simsek (TUR)
6 January 2018; 16:00	2× (yellow card) 4× (suspension)	Report	3× (yellow card) 4× (suspension)	Olymp Sportkomplex, Togliatti; Attendance: 2,500; Referees: Hatipoglu, Simsek (TUR)

6 January 2018; 17:00	Vipers Kristiansand (Norway)	22–23	(France) Issy Paris Hand	Aquarama Kristiansand, Kristiansand; Attendance: 1,512; Referees: Stark, Stefan (ROU)
6 January 2018; 17:00	three players 4	(12–13)	Abbingh 6	Aquarama Kristiansand, Kristiansand; Attendance: 1,512; Referees: Stark, Stefan (ROU)
6 January 2018; 17:00	3× (yellow card) 2× (suspension)	Report	3× (yellow card) 1× (suspension) 1× (red card)	Aquarama Kristiansand, Kristiansand; Attendance: 1,512; Referees: Stark, Stefan (ROU)

12 January 2018; 20:30	Issy Paris Hand (France)	17–27	(Russia) Lada	Stade Pierre de Coubertin, Paris; Attendance: 600; Referees: Bennani, Bennani (SWE)
12 January 2018; 20:30	Abbingh 5	(8–17)	Dmitrieva 8	Stade Pierre de Coubertin, Paris; Attendance: 600; Referees: Bennani, Bennani (SWE)
12 January 2018; 20:30	2× (yellow card) 5× (suspension)	Report	2× (yellow card) 4× (suspension)	Stade Pierre de Coubertin, Paris; Attendance: 600; Referees: Bennani, Bennani (SWE)

13 January 2018; 16:00	København Håndbold (Denmark)	30–25	(Norway) Vipers Kristiansand	Frederiksberghallen, Frederiksberg; Attendance: 844; Referees: Hofer, Schmidhuber (AUT)
13 January 2018; 16:00	Bidstrup 8	(16–13)	Arntzen 6	Frederiksberghallen, Frederiksberg; Attendance: 844; Referees: Hofer, Schmidhuber (AUT)
13 January 2018; 16:00	3× (yellow card) 4× (suspension)	Report	1× (yellow card) 2× (suspension)	Frederiksberghallen, Frederiksberg; Attendance: 844; Referees: Hofer, Schmidhuber (AUT)

20 January 2018; 16:00	Lada (Russia)	29–24	(Norway) Vipers Kristiansand	Olymp Sportkomplex, Togliatti; Attendance: 2,700; Referees: Antic, Jakovljevic (SRB)
20 January 2018; 16:00	Vedekhina 9	(14–12)	Kristiansen 7	Olymp Sportkomplex, Togliatti; Attendance: 2,700; Referees: Antic, Jakovljevic (SRB)
20 January 2018; 16:00	1× (yellow card) 3× (suspension)	Report	2× (yellow card) 2× (suspension)	Olymp Sportkomplex, Togliatti; Attendance: 2,700; Referees: Antic, Jakovljevic (SRB)

21 January 2018; 14:00	København Håndbold (Denmark)	29–30	(France) Issy Paris Hand	Frederiksberghallen, Frederiksberg; Attendance: 743; Referees: Christidi, Papamattheou (GRE)
21 January 2018; 14:00	Bont 8	(13–13)	Pintea 8	Frederiksberghallen, Frederiksberg; Attendance: 743; Referees: Christidi, Papamattheou (GRE)
21 January 2018; 14:00	1× (yellow card) 3× (suspension)	Report	2× (yellow card) 3× (suspension)	Frederiksberghallen, Frederiksberg; Attendance: 743; Referees: Christidi, Papamattheou (GRE)

27 January 2018; 17:00	Vipers Kristiansand (Norway)	30–21	(Russia) Lada	Aquarama Kristiansand, Kristiansand; Attendance: 1,040; Referees: Thomassen, Schols (BEL)
27 January 2018; 17:00	Sulland 11	(14–11)	Dmitrieva 7	Aquarama Kristiansand, Kristiansand; Attendance: 1,040; Referees: Thomassen, Schols (BEL)
27 January 2018; 17:00	1× (yellow card) 3× (suspension)	Report	3× (yellow card) 5× (suspension)	Aquarama Kristiansand, Kristiansand; Attendance: 1,040; Referees: Thomassen, Schols (BEL)

28 January 2018; 16:00	Issy Paris Hand (France)	28–28	(Denmark) København Håndbold	Palais des sports Robert Charpentier, Issy-les-Moulineaux; Attendance: 1,300; Referees: Ilieva, Karbeska (MKD)
28 January 2018; 16:00	Pintea 9	(14–13)	Bidstrup 7	Palais des sports Robert Charpentier, Issy-les-Moulineaux; Attendance: 1,300; Referees: Ilieva, Karbeska (MKD)
28 January 2018; 16:00	3× (yellow card) 1× (suspension)	Report	3× (yellow card) 1× (suspension)	Palais des sports Robert Charpentier, Issy-les-Moulineaux; Attendance: 1,300; Referees: Ilieva, Karbeska (MKD)

3 February 2018; 20:30	Issy Paris Hand (France)	24–25	(Norway) Vipers Kristiansand	Vélodrome de Saint-Quentin-en-Yvelines, Montigny-le-Bretonneux; Attendance: 5,000; Referees: Budzak, Zahradnik (SVK)
3 February 2018; 20:30	Sercien-Ugolin 6	(12–9)	Sulland 10	Vélodrome de Saint-Quentin-en-Yvelines, Montigny-le-Bretonneux; Attendance: 5,000; Referees: Budzak, Zahradnik (SVK)
3 February 2018; 20:30	3× (yellow card) 3× (suspension)	Report	1× (yellow card) 3× (suspension)	Vélodrome de Saint-Quentin-en-Yvelines, Montigny-le-Bretonneux; Attendance: 5,000; Referees: Budzak, Zahradnik (SVK)

4 February 2018; 14:00	København Håndbold (Denmark)	28–31	(Russia) Lada	Frederiksberghallen, Frederiksberg; Attendance: 704; Referees: Jerlecki, Labun (POL)
4 February 2018; 14:00	Bidstrup 7	(11–17)	Dmitrieva 12	Frederiksberghallen, Frederiksberg; Attendance: 704; Referees: Jerlecki, Labun (POL)
4 February 2018; 14:00	3× (yellow card) 4× (suspension)	Report	3× (yellow card) 7× (suspension)	Frederiksberghallen, Frederiksberg; Attendance: 704; Referees: Jerlecki, Labun (POL)

10 February 2018; 16:00	Lada (Russia)	25–24	(France) Issy Paris Hand	Olymp Sportkomplex, Togliatti; Attendance: 2,700; Referees: Doychinov, Goretsov (BUL)
10 February 2018; 16:00	Dmitrieva 9	(13–13)	Sercien-Ugolin 5	Olymp Sportkomplex, Togliatti; Attendance: 2,700; Referees: Doychinov, Goretsov (BUL)
10 February 2018; 16:00	2× (yellow card) 4× (suspension)	Report	2× (yellow card) 5× (suspension)	Olymp Sportkomplex, Togliatti; Attendance: 2,700; Referees: Doychinov, Goretsov (BUL)

10 February 2017; 17:00	Vipers Kristiansand (Norway)	30–23	(Denmark) København Håndbold	Aquarama Kristiansand, Kristiansand; Attendance: 1,517; Referees: Zendali, Riello (ITA)
10 February 2017; 17:00	Brattset 10	(11–12)	Lykkegaard 6	Aquarama Kristiansand, Kristiansand; Attendance: 1,517; Referees: Zendali, Riello (ITA)
10 February 2017; 17:00	2× (yellow card)	Report	4× (yellow card)	Aquarama Kristiansand, Kristiansand; Attendance: 1,517; Referees: Zendali, Riello (ITA)

=== Group C ===
Pos	Team	Pld	W	D	L	GF	GA	GD	Pts	Qualification
1	(Turkey) Kastamonu Belediyesi	6	5	0	1	165	146	+19	10	Quarterfinals
2	(Denmark) Viborg HK	6	4	0	2	157	148	+9	8	Quarterfinals
3	(Norway) Byåsen Håndball Elite	6	3	0	3	166	152	+14	6	
4	(Poland) Vistal Gdynia	6	0	0	6	137	179	−42	0	

Source: EHF
Rules for classification: See Tiebreakers

5 January 2018; 19:00	Vistal Gdynia (Poland)	22–24	(Norway) Byåsen Håndball Elite	Gdynia Sports Arena, Gdynia; Attendance: 800; Referees: Lindenbaum, Laron (ISR)
5 January 2018; 19:00	Zych 13	(8–15)	Högdahl, Jacobsen 7	Gdynia Sports Arena, Gdynia; Attendance: 800; Referees: Lindenbaum, Laron (ISR)
5 January 2018; 19:00	1× (yellow card) 3× (suspension)	Report	2× (yellow card) 5× (suspension)	Gdynia Sports Arena, Gdynia; Attendance: 800; Referees: Lindenbaum, Laron (ISR)

6 January 2018; 16:00	Viborg HK (Denmark)	26–28	(Turkey) Kastamonu Belediyesi	Vibocold Arena Viborg, Viborg; Attendance: 793; Referees: Budzak, Zahradnik (SVK)
6 January 2018; 16:00	Nørgaard 10	(13–15)	İskenderoğlu 11	Vibocold Arena Viborg, Viborg; Attendance: 793; Referees: Budzak, Zahradnik (SVK)
6 January 2018; 16:00	3× (yellow card) 2× (suspension)	Report	2× (yellow card) 2× (suspension)	Vibocold Arena Viborg, Viborg; Attendance: 793; Referees: Budzak, Zahradnik (SVK)

13 January 2018; 17:00	Byåsen Håndball Elite (Norway)	21–28	(Denmark) Viborg HK	Trondheim Spektrum, Trondheim; Attendance: 850; Referees: Loncar, Loncar (CRO)
13 January 2018; 17:00	Högdahl 6	(10–12)	Jørgensen 6	Trondheim Spektrum, Trondheim; Attendance: 850; Referees: Loncar, Loncar (CRO)
13 January 2018; 17:00	2× (yellow card) 1× (suspension)	Report	2× (yellow card) 5× (suspension)	Trondheim Spektrum, Trondheim; Attendance: 850; Referees: Loncar, Loncar (CRO)

14 January 2018; 17:00	Kastamonu Belediyesi (Turkey)	28–25	(Poland) Vistal Gdynia	Atatürk Sports Hall, Kastamonu; Attendance: 1,500; Referees: Metalari, Nikolovski (MKD)
14 January 2018; 17:00	İskenderoğlu 9	(16–12)	Zych 10	Atatürk Sports Hall, Kastamonu; Attendance: 1,500; Referees: Metalari, Nikolovski (MKD)
14 January 2018; 17:00	3× (yellow card) 3× (suspension)	Report	3× (yellow card) 4× (suspension)	Atatürk Sports Hall, Kastamonu; Attendance: 1,500; Referees: Metalari, Nikolovski (MKD)

21 January 2018; 14:00	Viborg HK (Denmark)	27–24	(Poland) Vistal Gdynia	Vibocold Arena Viborg, Viborg; Attendance: 1,026; Referees: Stokes, Bartlett (GBR)
21 January 2018; 14:00	Nielsen 6	(15–11)	Matieli 9	Vibocold Arena Viborg, Viborg; Attendance: 1,026; Referees: Stokes, Bartlett (GBR)
21 January 2018; 14:00	2× (yellow card) 1× (suspension)	Report	2× (yellow card) 5× (suspension)	Vibocold Arena Viborg, Viborg; Attendance: 1,026; Referees: Stokes, Bartlett (GBR)

21 January 2018; 17:00	Kastamonu Belediyesi (Turkey)	30–28	(Norway) Byåsen Håndball Elite	Atatürk Sports Hall, Kastamonu; Attendance: 1,500; Referees: Haramul, Blanar (CZE)
21 January 2018; 17:00	İskenderoğlu 9	(19–12)	Jacobsen 8	Atatürk Sports Hall, Kastamonu; Attendance: 1,500; Referees: Haramul, Blanar (CZE)
21 January 2018; 17:00	2× (yellow card) 4× (suspension)	Report	2× (yellow card) 3× (suspension)	Atatürk Sports Hall, Kastamonu; Attendance: 1,500; Referees: Haramul, Blanar (CZE)

27 January 2018; 17:00	Byåsen Håndball Elite (Norway)	26–24	(Turkey) Kastamonu Belediyesi	Trondheim Spektrum, Trondheim; Attendance: 430; Referees: Pirvu, Potirniche (ROU)
27 January 2018; 17:00	Jacobsen 7	(12–9)	Uskova 6	Trondheim Spektrum, Trondheim; Attendance: 430; Referees: Pirvu, Potirniche (ROU)
27 January 2018; 17:00	3× (yellow card) 3× (suspension)	Report	3× (yellow card) 5× (suspension)	Trondheim Spektrum, Trondheim; Attendance: 430; Referees: Pirvu, Potirniche (ROU)

28 January 2018; 15:00	Vistal Gdynia (Poland)	21–32	(Denmark) Viborg HK	Gdynia Sports Arena, Gdynia; Attendance: 400; Referees: Di Domenico, Fornasier (ITA)
28 January 2018; 15:00	Zych 5	(15–15)	Nørgaard 9	Gdynia Sports Arena, Gdynia; Attendance: 400; Referees: Di Domenico, Fornasier (ITA)
28 January 2018; 15:00	3× (yellow card) 1× (suspension)	Report	3× (yellow card)	Gdynia Sports Arena, Gdynia; Attendance: 400; Referees: Di Domenico, Fornasier (ITA)

3 February 2018; 17:00	Byåsen Håndball Elite (Norway)	41–19	(Poland) Vistal Gdynia	Trondheim Spektrum, Trondheim; Attendance: 520; Referees: Geraets, Geraets (NED)
3 February 2018; 17:00	Högdahl 9	(18–9)	Kozłowska 6	Trondheim Spektrum, Trondheim; Attendance: 520; Referees: Geraets, Geraets (NED)
3 February 2018; 17:00	3× (yellow card) 2× (suspension)	Report	3× (yellow card) 2× (suspension)	Trondheim Spektrum, Trondheim; Attendance: 520; Referees: Geraets, Geraets (NED)

4 February 2018; 17:00	Kastamonu Belediyesi (Turkey)	28–15	(Denmark) Viborg HK	Atatürk Sports Hall, Kastamonu; Attendance: 1,500; Referees: Kaludjerovic, Vujacic (MNE)
4 February 2018; 17:00	Uskova 6	(13–6)	Nørgaard 4	Atatürk Sports Hall, Kastamonu; Attendance: 1,500; Referees: Kaludjerovic, Vujacic (MNE)
4 February 2018; 17:00	3× (yellow card) 3× (suspension)	Report	3× (yellow card) 1× (suspension)	Atatürk Sports Hall, Kastamonu; Attendance: 1,500; Referees: Kaludjerovic, Vujacic (MNE)

9 February 2018; 17:00	Vistal Gdynia (Poland)	26–27	(Turkey) Kastamonu Belediyesi	Gdynia Sports Arena, Gdynia; Attendance: 300; Referees: Rakytina, Tkachuk (UKR)
9 February 2018; 17:00	Zych 10	(13–12)	Uskova 5	Gdynia Sports Arena, Gdynia; Attendance: 300; Referees: Rakytina, Tkachuk (UKR)
9 February 2018; 17:00	1× (yellow card) 4× (suspension)	Report	3× (yellow card) 9× (suspension)	Gdynia Sports Arena, Gdynia; Attendance: 300; Referees: Rakytina, Tkachuk (UKR)

10 February 2017; 14:00	Viborg HK (Denmark)	29–26	(Norway) Byåsen Håndball Elite	Vibocold Arena Viborg, Viborg; Attendance: 1,268; Referees: Hofer, Schmidhuber (AUT)
10 February 2017; 14:00	Nielsen, Strömberg 6	(16–16)	Högdahl 9	Vibocold Arena Viborg, Viborg; Attendance: 1,268; Referees: Hofer, Schmidhuber (AUT)
10 February 2017; 14:00	2× (yellow card) 3× (suspension) 1× (red card)	Report	2× (yellow card) 2× (suspension)	Vibocold Arena Viborg, Viborg; Attendance: 1,268; Referees: Hofer, Schmidhuber (AUT)

=== Group D ===
Pos	Team	Pld	W	D	L	GF	GA	GD	Pts	Qualification
1	(Norway) Larvik HK	6	4	1	1	166	146	+20	9	Quarterfinals
2	(Romania) HC Zalău	6	4	0	2	147	151	−4	8	Quarterfinals
3	(Sweden) H 65 Höör	6	3	0	3	158	150	+8	6	
4	(Czech Republic) DHK Baník Most	6	0	1	5	146	170	−24	1	

Source: EHF
Rules for classification: See Tiebreakers

6 January 2018; 15:00	H 65 Höör (Sweden)	28–27	(Czech Republic) DHK Baník Most	Eslövhallen, Eslöv; Attendance: 1,200; Referees: Kjaer, Pedersen (DEN)
6 January 2018; 15:00	Mässing 6	(10–14)	Jeřábková 14	Eslövhallen, Eslöv; Attendance: 1,200; Referees: Kjaer, Pedersen (DEN)
6 January 2018; 15:00	2× (yellow card) 2× (suspension)	Report	1× (yellow card) 1× (suspension)	Eslövhallen, Eslöv; Attendance: 1,200; Referees: Kjaer, Pedersen (DEN)

7 January 2018; 17:00	Larvik HK (Norway)	28–23	(Romania) HC Zalău	Boligmappa Arena Larvik, Larvik; Attendance: 889; Referees: Simone, Monitillo (ITA)
7 January 2018; 17:00	Breistøl 9	(15–7)	Tamas 6	Boligmappa Arena Larvik, Larvik; Attendance: 889; Referees: Simone, Monitillo (ITA)
7 January 2018; 17:00	2× (yellow card) 3× (suspension)	Report	3× (yellow card) 4× (suspension)	Boligmappa Arena Larvik, Larvik; Attendance: 889; Referees: Simone, Monitillo (ITA)

13 January 2018; 18:00	DHK Baník Most (Czech Republic)	21–21	(Norway) Larvik HK	Most Sports Hall, Most; Attendance: 1,000; Referees: Pandzic, Satordzija (BIH)
13 January 2018; 18:00	Szarková 10	(11–12)	Mørk 8	Most Sports Hall, Most; Attendance: 1,000; Referees: Pandzic, Satordzija (BIH)
13 January 2018; 18:00	3× (yellow card) 5× (suspension)	Report	3× (yellow card) 4× (suspension)	Most Sports Hall, Most; Attendance: 1,000; Referees: Pandzic, Satordzija (BIH)

14 January 2018; 17:00	HC Zalău (Romania)	24–21	(Sweden) H 65 Höör	Gheorge Tadici Sports Hall, Zalău; Attendance: 900; Referees: Chaskis, Tsakonas (GRE)
14 January 2018; 17:00	Dragut 6	(10–8)	Bardis 5	Gheorge Tadici Sports Hall, Zalău; Attendance: 900; Referees: Chaskis, Tsakonas (GRE)
14 January 2018; 17:00	3× (yellow card) 5× (suspension)	Report	3× (yellow card) 5× (suspension)	Gheorge Tadici Sports Hall, Zalău; Attendance: 900; Referees: Chaskis, Tsakonas (GRE)

20 January 2018; 15:00	H 65 Höör (Sweden)	25–27	(Norway) Larvik HK	Eslövhallen, Eslöv; Attendance: 1,200; Referees: Rakytina, Tkachuk (UKR)
20 January 2018; 15:00	three players 4	(14–14)	Hjertner 6	Eslövhallen, Eslöv; Attendance: 1,200; Referees: Rakytina, Tkachuk (UKR)
20 January 2018; 15:00	3× (yellow card) 4× (suspension) 1× (red card)	Report	3× (yellow card) 4× (suspension)	Eslövhallen, Eslöv; Attendance: 1,200; Referees: Rakytina, Tkachuk (UKR)

21 January 2018; 18:00	DHK Baník Most (Czech Republic)	22–25	(Romania) HC Zalău	Most Sports Hall, Most; Attendance: 1,250; Referees: Barysas, Petrusis (LTU)
21 January 2018; 18:00	Zachová 8	(12–11)	Rob 6	Most Sports Hall, Most; Attendance: 1,250; Referees: Barysas, Petrusis (LTU)
21 January 2018; 18:00	2× (yellow card)	Report	3× (yellow card) 5× (suspension) 1× (red card)	Most Sports Hall, Most; Attendance: 1,250; Referees: Barysas, Petrusis (LTU)

27 January 2018; 17:00	HC Zalău (Romania)	31–28	(Czech Republic) DHK Baník Most	Gheorge Tadici Sports Hall, Zalău; Attendance: 915; Referees: Beqiri, Krasniqi (KOS)
27 January 2018; 17:00	Rob 9	(15–13)	Szarková 8	Gheorge Tadici Sports Hall, Zalău; Attendance: 915; Referees: Beqiri, Krasniqi (KOS)
27 January 2018; 17:00	3× (yellow card) 1× (suspension)	Report	3× (yellow card)	Gheorge Tadici Sports Hall, Zalău; Attendance: 915; Referees: Beqiri, Krasniqi (KOS)

27 January 2018; 17:00	Larvik HK (Norway)	34–23	(Sweden) H 65 Höör	Boligmappa Arena Larvik, Larvik; Attendance: 409; Referees: Šniūrevičius, Grigalionis (LTU)
27 January 2018; 17:00	Mørk 10	(20–10)	Olsson 7	Boligmappa Arena Larvik, Larvik; Attendance: 409; Referees: Šniūrevičius, Grigalionis (LTU)
27 January 2018; 17:00	1× (yellow card) 4× (suspension)	Report	3× (yellow card) 6× (suspension) 1× (red card)	Boligmappa Arena Larvik, Larvik; Attendance: 409; Referees: Šniūrevičius, Grigalionis (LTU)

4 February 2018; 17:00	HC Zalău (Romania)	25–22	(Norway) Larvik HK	Gheorge Tadici Sports Hall, Zalău; Attendance: 900; Referees: Sekulic, Jovandic (SRB)
4 February 2018; 17:00	four players 4	(13–9)	Breistøl 7	Gheorge Tadici Sports Hall, Zalău; Attendance: 900; Referees: Sekulic, Jovandic (SRB)
4 February 2018; 17:00	3× (yellow card) 3× (suspension)	Report	3× (yellow card) 2× (suspension)	Gheorge Tadici Sports Hall, Zalău; Attendance: 900; Referees: Sekulic, Jovandic (SRB)

4 February 2018; 18:00	DHK Baník Most (Czech Republic)	19–31	(Sweden) H 65 Höör	Most Sports Hall, Most; Attendance: 700; Referees: Rauchs, Linster (LUX)
4 February 2018; 18:00	Szarková 11	(11–15)	Lindqvist, Olsson 7	Most Sports Hall, Most; Attendance: 700; Referees: Rauchs, Linster (LUX)
4 February 2018; 18:00	1× (yellow card) 2× (suspension)	Report	3× (yellow card) 2× (suspension)	Most Sports Hall, Most; Attendance: 700; Referees: Rauchs, Linster (LUX)

10 February 2018; 15:00	H 65 Höör (Sweden)	30–19	(Romania) HC Zalău	Sparbanken Skåne Arena, Lund; Attendance: 300; Referees: Pech, Vagvölgyi (HUN)
10 February 2018; 15:00	Mässing 7	(15–8)	Rob 6	Sparbanken Skåne Arena, Lund; Attendance: 300; Referees: Pech, Vagvölgyi (HUN)
10 February 2018; 15:00	2× (yellow card) 5× (suspension)	Report	3× (yellow card) 4× (suspension)	Sparbanken Skåne Arena, Lund; Attendance: 300; Referees: Pech, Vagvölgyi (HUN)

10 February 2017; 17:30	Larvik HK (Norway)	34–29	(Czech Republic) DHK Baník Most	Boligmappa Arena Larvik, Larvik; Attendance: 417; Referees: Mertinian, Syrepisios (GRE)
10 February 2017; 17:30	Lima de Araújo, Mørk 6	(16–17)	Szarková 11	Boligmappa Arena Larvik, Larvik; Attendance: 417; Referees: Mertinian, Syrepisios (GRE)
10 February 2017; 17:30	2× (yellow card) 4× (suspension)	Report	3× (yellow card) 4× (suspension)	Boligmappa Arena Larvik, Larvik; Attendance: 417; Referees: Mertinian, Syrepisios (GRE)
