= 2018 European Women's Handball Championship =

2018 EHF European Women's Handball Championship

Tournament details
- Host country: France
- Venues: 5 (in 5 host cities)
- Dates: 29 November–16 December
- Teams: 16 (from 1 confederation)

Final positions
- Champions: France (1st title)
- Runners-up: Russia
- Third place: Netherlands
- Fourth place: Romania

Tournament statistics
- Matches played: 47
- Goals scored: 2,504 (53.28 per match)
- Attendance: 237,980 (5,063 per match)
- Top scorer(s): (Serbia) Katarina Krpež Slezak (50 goals)

Awards
- Best player: (Russia) Anna Vyakhireva

The 2018 European Women's Handball Championship was held in France in from 29 November to 16 December 2018. It was the first time France hosts the women's tournament. The matches were played in Brest, Montbéliard, Nancy, Nantes and Paris.

France defeated Russia in the final to claim their first title.

== Bidding process ==
The interested nations were as follows:

- France
- Norway
- Ukraine

In December 2013, these were announced as the bids:

- France
- Norway

France was recommended as the preferred bid. On 20 September 2014, in Dublin, Ireland, France was announced as the host. This is the first time France is hosting the Women's EHF Euro.

== Venues ==
| Paris | Nantes | Montbéliard |
|---|---|---|
| AccorHotels Arena; Capacity: 15,603 | Hall XXL; Capacity: 12,000 | Axone; Capacity: 6,400 |
2018 European Women's Handball Championship is located in France
| Nancy | | Brest |
| Palais des Sports Jean Weille; Capacity: 6,000 | | Brest Arena; Capacity: 4,500 |

== Qualification ==
=== Qualified teams ===
All 16 qualified teams took part in the previous 2016 championship.

| Country | Qualified as | Date of qualification | Previous appearances in tournament |
|---|---|---|---|
| France | Host | 20 September 2014 | 9 (2000, 2002, 2004, 2006, 2008, 2010, 2012, 2014, 2016) |
| Denmark | Group 5 winner | 24 March 2018 | 12 (**1994**, **1996**, 1998, 2000, **2002**, 2004, 2006, 2008, 2010, 2012, 2014, 2016) |
| Montenegro | Group 2 winner | 24 March 2018 | 4 (2010, **2012**, 2014, 2016) |
| Norway | Group 1 winner | 25 March 2018 | 12 (1994, 1996, **1998**, 2000, 2002, **2004**, **2006**, **2008**, **2010**, 2012, **2014**, **2016**) |
| Spain | Group 6 winner | 30 May 2018 | 9 (1998, 2002, 2004, 2006, 2008, 2010, 2012, 2014, 2016) |
| Sweden | Group 3 runner-up | 30 May 2018 | 10 (1994, 1996, 2002, 2004, 2006, 2008, 2010, 2012, 2014, 2016) |
| Serbia | Group 3 winner | 30 May 2018 | 6 (2006, 2008, 2010, 2012, 2014, 2016) |
| Germany | Group 6 runner-up | 31 May 2018 | 12 (1994, 1996, 1998, 2000, 2002, 2004, 2006, 2008, 2010, 2012, 2014, 2016) |
| Hungary | Group 7 winner | 31 May 2018 | 12 (1994, 1996, 1998, **2000**, 2002, 2004, 2006, 2008, 2010, 2012, 2014, 2016) |
| Netherlands | Group 7 runner-up | 31 May 2018 | 6 (1998, 2002, 2006, 2010, 2014, 2016) |
| Romania | Group 4 winner | 31 May 2018 | 11 (1994, 1996, 1998, 2000, 2002, 2004, 2008, 2010, 2012, 2014, 2016) |
| Croatia | Group 1 runner-up | 2 June 2018 | 9 (1994, 1996, 2004, 2006, 2008, 2010, 2012, 2014, 2016) |
| Russia | Group 4 runner-up | 3 June 2018 | 12 (1994, 1996, 1998, 2000, 2002, 2004, 2006, 2008, 2010, 2012, 2014, 2016) |
| Poland | Group 2 runner-up | 3 June 2018 | 5 (1996, 1998, 2006, 2014, 2016) |
| Czech Republic | Group 5 runner-up | 3 June 2018 | 5 (1994, 2002, 2004, 2012, 2016) |
| Slovenia | Best third-ranked team | 3 June 2018 | 5 (2002, 2004, 2006, 2010, 2016) |

Note: Bold indicates champion for that year. Italic indicates host for that year.

== Draw ==
The draw was held on 12 June 2018 at 12:00 at the Maison de la Radio in Paris, France.

=== Seedings ===
The pots were announced on 4 June 2018.

| Pot 1 | Pot 2 | Pot 3 | Pot 4 |
|---|---|---|---|
| Norway; Hungary; France; Denmark | Romania; Spain; Serbia; Montenegro | Netherlands; Germany; Russia; Sweden | Czech Republic; Poland; Croatia; Slovenia |

== Referees ==
12 referee pairs were selected on 4 October 2018.

Referees
| Austria | Ana Vranes; Marlis Wenninger |
| Croatia | Dalibor Jurinović; Marko Mrvica |
| Denmark | Karina Christiansen; Line Hansen |
| France | Charlotte Bonaventura; Julie Bonaventura |
| Greece | Michalis Tzaferopoulos; Andreas Bethmann |
| Hungary | Péter Horváth; Balázs Márton |

Referees
| Moldova | Igor Covalciuc; Alexei Covalciuc |
| Romania | Cristina Năstase; Simona Stancu |
| Russia | Victoria Alpaidze; Tatyana Berezkina |
| Serbia | Aleksandar Pandžić; Ivan Mošorinski |
| Spain | Andreu Marín; Ignacio García |
| Sweden | Maria Bennani; Safia Bennani |

== Preliminary round ==
All times are local (UTC+1).

=== Group A ===
| Pos | Team | Pld | W | D | L | GF | GA | GD | Pts | Qualification |
|---|---|---|---|---|---|---|---|---|---|---|
| 1 | Serbia | 3 | 2 | 0 | 1 | 84 | 73 | +11 | 4 (Note: Serbia 2 Pts, +4 GD; Sweden 2 Pts, 0 GD; Denmark 2 Pts, −4 GD) | Main round |
| 2 | Sweden | 3 | 2 | 0 | 1 | 74 | 73 | +1 | 4 | Main round |
| 3 | Denmark | 3 | 2 | 0 | 1 | 83 | 80 | +3 | 4 | Main round |
| 4 | Poland | 3 | 0 | 0 | 3 | 69 | 84 | −15 | 0 | |

Source: EHF
Rules for classification: 1) points; 2) head-to-head points; 3) head-to-head goal difference; 4) head-to-head number of goals scored; 5) goal difference.
Notes:

| 30 November 2018; 18:00 | Serbia | 33–26 | Poland | Hall XXL, Nantes; Attendance: 2,230; Referees: Bethmann, Tzaferopoulos (GRE) |
| 30 November 2018; 18:00 | Krpež Šlezak 11 | (13–14) | Kudłacz-Gloc 6 | Hall XXL, Nantes; Attendance: 2,230; Referees: Bethmann, Tzaferopoulos (GRE) |
| 30 November 2018; 18:00 | 1× (yellow card) 3× (suspension) | Report | 1× (yellow card) 4× (suspension) | Hall XXL, Nantes; Attendance: 2,230; Referees: Bethmann, Tzaferopoulos (GRE) |

| 30 November 2018; 21:00 | Denmark | 30–29 | Sweden | Hall XXL, Nantes; Attendance: 3,847; Referees: Jurinović, Mrvica (CRO) |
| 30 November 2018; 21:00 | Tranborg 7 | (15–16) | Hagman 7 | Hall XXL, Nantes; Attendance: 3,847; Referees: Jurinović, Mrvica (CRO) |
| 30 November 2018; 21:00 | 2× (yellow card) 6× (suspension) 1× (red card) | Report | 3× (yellow card) 3× (suspension) | Hall XXL, Nantes; Attendance: 3,847; Referees: Jurinović, Mrvica (CRO) |

| 2 December 2018; 15:00 | Poland | 21–28 | Denmark | Hall XXL, Nantes; Attendance: 3,683; Referees: Horváth, Márton (HUN) |
| 2 December 2018; 15:00 | Kobylińska 7 | (9–11) | K. Jørgensen, Østergaard 5 | Hall XXL, Nantes; Attendance: 3,683; Referees: Horváth, Márton (HUN) |
| 2 December 2018; 15:00 | 2× (yellow card) 1× (suspension) 1× (red card) | Report | 2× (yellow card) 6× (suspension) | Hall XXL, Nantes; Attendance: 3,683; Referees: Horváth, Márton (HUN) |

| 2 December 2018; 18:00 | Sweden | 22–21 | Serbia | Hall XXL, Nantes; Attendance: 3,810; Referees: Năstase, Stancu (ROU) |
| 2 December 2018; 18:00 | Alm 5 | (11–13) | Krpež Slezak 7 | Hall XXL, Nantes; Attendance: 3,810; Referees: Năstase, Stancu (ROU) |
| 2 December 2018; 18:00 | 1× (yellow card) 4× (suspension) | Report | 3× (yellow card) 5× (suspension) | Hall XXL, Nantes; Attendance: 3,810; Referees: Năstase, Stancu (ROU) |

| 4 December 2018; 18:00 | Sweden | 23–22 | Poland | Hall XXL, Nantes; Attendance: 3,014; Referees: García, Marín (ESP) |
| 4 December 2018; 18:00 | Blomstrand, Hagman 4 | (10–5) | Grzyb 9 | Hall XXL, Nantes; Attendance: 3,014; Referees: García, Marín (ESP) |
| 4 December 2018; 18:00 | 3× (yellow card) 2× (suspension) | Report | 1× (yellow card) 5× (suspension) | Hall XXL, Nantes; Attendance: 3,014; Referees: García, Marín (ESP) |

| 4 December 2018; 21:00 | Denmark | 25–30 | Serbia | Hall XXL, Nantes; Attendance: 3,026; Referees: Covalciuc, Covalciuc (MDA) |
| 4 December 2018; 21:00 | Østergaard 6 | (13–17) | Krpež Šlezak, Lekić 8 | Hall XXL, Nantes; Attendance: 3,026; Referees: Covalciuc, Covalciuc (MDA) |
| 4 December 2018; 21:00 | 3× (yellow card) 4× (suspension) | Report | 2× (yellow card) 2× (suspension) | Hall XXL, Nantes; Attendance: 3,026; Referees: Covalciuc, Covalciuc (MDA) |

=== Group B ===
| Pos | Team | Pld | W | D | L | GF | GA | GD | Pts | Qualification |
|---|---|---|---|---|---|---|---|---|---|---|
| 1 | Russia | 3 | 2 | 0 | 1 | 77 | 75 | +2 | 4 (Note: France 23–26 Russia) | Main round |
| 2 | France (H) | 3 | 2 | 0 | 1 | 78 | 67 | +11 | 4 | Main round |
| 3 | Montenegro | 3 | 1 | 0 | 2 | 79 | 81 | −2 | 2 (Note: Montenegro 36–32 Slovenia) | Main round |
| 4 | Slovenia | 3 | 1 | 0 | 2 | 82 | 93 | −11 | 2 | |

Source: EHF
Rules for classification: 1) points; 2) head-to-head points; 3) head-to-head goal difference; 4) head-to-head number of goals scored; 5) goal difference.
(H) Hosts
Notes:

| 29 November 2018; 21:00 | France | 23–26 | Russia | Palais des Sports Jean Weille, Nancy; Attendance: 5,220; Referees: García, Marín (ESP) |
| 29 November 2018; 21:00 | Kanor 6 | (11–11) | Dmitrieva 8 | Palais des Sports Jean Weille, Nancy; Attendance: 5,220; Referees: García, Marín (ESP) |
| 29 November 2018; 21:00 | 4× (yellow card) 5× (suspension) | Report | 2× (yellow card) 4× (suspension) | Palais des Sports Jean Weille, Nancy; Attendance: 5,220; Referees: García, Marín (ESP) |

| 30 November 2018; 21:00 | Montenegro | 36–32 | Slovenia | Palais des Sports Jean Weille, Nancy; Attendance: 1,956; Referees: Năstase, Stancu (ROU) |
| 30 November 2018; 21:00 | Radičević 7 | (18–12) | Gros 8 | Palais des Sports Jean Weille, Nancy; Attendance: 1,956; Referees: Năstase, Stancu (ROU) |
| 30 November 2018; 21:00 | 2× (yellow card) 6× (suspension) | Report | 3× (yellow card) 2× (suspension) | Palais des Sports Jean Weille, Nancy; Attendance: 1,956; Referees: Năstase, Stancu (ROU) |

| 2 December 2018; 15:00 | Slovenia | 21–30 | France | Palais des Sports Jean Weille, Nancy; Attendance: 5,220; Referees: Covalciuc, Covalciuc (MDA) |
| 2 December 2018; 15:00 | Gros 5 | (8–17) | Zaadi 6 | Palais des Sports Jean Weille, Nancy; Attendance: 5,220; Referees: Covalciuc, Covalciuc (MDA) |
| 2 December 2018; 15:00 | 2× (yellow card) 2× (suspension) | Report | 4× (yellow card) 2× (suspension) | Palais des Sports Jean Weille, Nancy; Attendance: 5,220; Referees: Covalciuc, Covalciuc (MDA) |

| 2 December 2018; 18:00 | Russia | 24–23 | Montenegro | Palais des Sports Jean Weille, Nancy; Attendance: 3,229; Referees: Jurinović, Mrvica (CRO) |
| 2 December 2018; 18:00 | Samokhina 7 | (13–15) | Jauković 12 | Palais des Sports Jean Weille, Nancy; Attendance: 3,229; Referees: Jurinović, Mrvica (CRO) |
| 2 December 2018; 18:00 | 3× (yellow card) 5× (suspension) | Report | 4× (yellow card) 1× (suspension) | Palais des Sports Jean Weille, Nancy; Attendance: 3,229; Referees: Jurinović, Mrvica (CRO) |

| 4 December 2018; 18:00 | Russia | 27–29 | Slovenia | Palais des Sports Jean Weille, Nancy; Attendance: 3,120; Referees: Bethmann, Tzaferopoulos (GRE) |
| 4 December 2018; 18:00 | Kochetova 6 | (13–13) | Gros 12 | Palais des Sports Jean Weille, Nancy; Attendance: 3,120; Referees: Bethmann, Tzaferopoulos (GRE) |
| 4 December 2018; 18:00 | 3× (yellow card) 3× (suspension) 1× (red card) | Report | 3× (yellow card) 6× (suspension) | Palais des Sports Jean Weille, Nancy; Attendance: 3,120; Referees: Bethmann, Tzaferopoulos (GRE) |

| 4 December 2018; 21:00 | France | 25–20 | Montenegro | Palais des Sports Jean Weille, Nancy; Attendance: 5,220; Referees: Horváth, Márton (HUN) |
| 4 December 2018; 21:00 | Nze Minko 7 | (16–8) | Radičević 6 | Palais des Sports Jean Weille, Nancy; Attendance: 5,220; Referees: Horváth, Márton (HUN) |
| 4 December 2018; 21:00 | 3× (yellow card) 4× (suspension) | Report | 3× (yellow card) 4× (suspension) | Palais des Sports Jean Weille, Nancy; Attendance: 5,220; Referees: Horváth, Márton (HUN) |

=== Group C ===
| Pos | Team | Pld | W | D | L | GF | GA | GD | Pts | Qualification |
|---|---|---|---|---|---|---|---|---|---|---|
| 1 | Netherlands | 3 | 3 | 0 | 0 | 90 | 75 | +15 | 6 | Main round |
| 2 | Hungary | 3 | 2 | 0 | 1 | 81 | 72 | +9 | 4 | Main round |
| 3 | Spain | 3 | 1 | 0 | 2 | 78 | 78 | 0 | 2 | Main round |
| 4 | Croatia | 3 | 0 | 0 | 3 | 59 | 83 | −24 | 0 | |

Source: EHF
Rules for classification: 1) points; 2) head-to-head points; 3) head-to-head goal difference; 4) head-to-head number of goals scored; 5) goal difference.

| 1 December 2018; 15:00 | Hungary | 25–28 | Netherlands | Axone, Montbéliard; Attendance: 2,800; Referees: Alpaidze, Berezkina (RUS) |
| 1 December 2018; 15:00 | Háfra, Kovács 5 | (11–11) | Abbingh, Dulfer 5 | Axone, Montbéliard; Attendance: 2,800; Referees: Alpaidze, Berezkina (RUS) |
| 1 December 2018; 15:00 | 4× (yellow card) 5× (suspension) | Report | 1× (yellow card) 5× (suspension) | Axone, Montbéliard; Attendance: 2,800; Referees: Alpaidze, Berezkina (RUS) |

| 1 December 2018; 18:00 | Spain | 25–18 | Croatia | Axone, Montbéliard; Attendance: 3,600; Referees: Bennani, Bennani (SWE) |
| 1 December 2018; 18:00 | Pena 7 | (15–5) | Dežić 4 | Axone, Montbéliard; Attendance: 3,600; Referees: Bennani, Bennani (SWE) |
| 1 December 2018; 18:00 | 3× (yellow card) 3× (suspension) | Report | 2× (yellow card) 3× (suspension) | Axone, Montbéliard; Attendance: 3,600; Referees: Bennani, Bennani (SWE) |

| 3 December 2018; 18:00 | Croatia | 18–24 | Hungary | Axone, Montbéliard; Attendance: 2,731; Referees: Vranes, Wenninger (AUT) |
| 3 December 2018; 18:00 | Krsnik 8 | (9–13) | Háfra, Kovács, Schatzl 5 | Axone, Montbéliard; Attendance: 2,731; Referees: Vranes, Wenninger (AUT) |
| 3 December 2018; 18:00 | 1× (yellow card) 7× (suspension) | Report | 2× (yellow card) 4× (suspension) | Axone, Montbéliard; Attendance: 2,731; Referees: Vranes, Wenninger (AUT) |

| 3 December 2018; 21:00 | Netherlands | 28–27 | Spain | Axone, Montbéliard; Attendance: 3,862; Referees: Bonaventura, Bonaventura (FRA) |
| 3 December 2018; 21:00 | Groot 9 | (14–11) | Martín 6 | Axone, Montbéliard; Attendance: 3,862; Referees: Bonaventura, Bonaventura (FRA) |
| 3 December 2018; 21:00 | 2× (yellow card) 3× (suspension) | Report | 1× (yellow card) 6× (suspension) | Axone, Montbéliard; Attendance: 3,862; Referees: Bonaventura, Bonaventura (FRA) |

| 5 December 2018; 18:00 | Netherlands | 34–23 | Croatia | Axone, Montbéliard; Attendance: 4,470; Referees: Christiansen, Hansen (DEN) |
| 5 December 2018; 18:00 | Amega 8 | (17–10) | Kalaus, Turk 6 | Axone, Montbéliard; Attendance: 4,470; Referees: Christiansen, Hansen (DEN) |
| 5 December 2018; 18:00 | 2× (yellow card) 2× (suspension) | Report | 2× (yellow card) 2× (suspension) | Axone, Montbéliard; Attendance: 4,470; Referees: Christiansen, Hansen (DEN) |

| 5 December 2018; 21:00 | Hungary | 32–26 | Spain | Axone, Montbéliard; Attendance: 2,768; Referees: Mošorinski, Pandžić (SRB) |
| 5 December 2018; 21:00 | Planéta 8 | (19–14) | Martín 6 | Axone, Montbéliard; Attendance: 2,768; Referees: Mošorinski, Pandžić (SRB) |
| 5 December 2018; 21:00 | 3× (yellow card) 4× (suspension) | Report | 2× (yellow card) 2× (suspension) | Axone, Montbéliard; Attendance: 2,768; Referees: Mošorinski, Pandžić (SRB) |

=== Group D ===
| Pos | Team | Pld | W | D | L | GF | GA | GD | Pts | Qualification |
|---|---|---|---|---|---|---|---|---|---|---|
| 1 | Romania | 3 | 3 | 0 | 0 | 91 | 75 | +16 | 6 | Main round |
| 2 | Germany | 3 | 2 | 0 | 1 | 87 | 89 | −2 | 4 | Main round |
| 3 | Norway | 3 | 1 | 0 | 2 | 86 | 81 | +5 | 2 | Main round |
| 4 | Czech Republic | 3 | 0 | 0 | 3 | 73 | 92 | −19 | 0 | |

Source: EHF
Rules for classification: 1) points; 2) head-to-head points; 3) head-to-head goal difference; 4) head-to-head number of goals scored; 5) goal difference.

| 1 December 2018; 15:00 | Norway | 32–33 | Germany | Brest Arena, Brest; Attendance: 3,520; Referees: Bonaventura, Bonaventura (FRA) |
| 1 December 2018; 15:00 | Oftedal 7 | (16–15) | Bölk, Großmann 5 | Brest Arena, Brest; Attendance: 3,520; Referees: Bonaventura, Bonaventura (FRA) |
| 1 December 2018; 15:00 | 2× (yellow card) 5× (suspension) | Report | 2× (yellow card) 5× (suspension) | Brest Arena, Brest; Attendance: 3,520; Referees: Bonaventura, Bonaventura (FRA) |

| 1 December 2018; 18:00 | Romania | 31–28 | Czech Republic | Brest Arena, Brest; Attendance: 3,098; Referees: Christiansen, Hansen (DEN) |
| 1 December 2018; 18:00 | Buceschi 9 | (17–11) | Luzumová, Malá 5 | Brest Arena, Brest; Attendance: 3,098; Referees: Christiansen, Hansen (DEN) |
| 1 December 2018; 18:00 | 1× (yellow card) 4× (suspension) | Report | 2× (yellow card) 7× (suspension) 1× (red card) | Brest Arena, Brest; Attendance: 3,098; Referees: Christiansen, Hansen (DEN) |

| 3 December 2018; 18:00 | Germany | 24–29 | Romania | Brest Arena, Brest; Attendance: 2,106; Referees: Mošorinski, Pandžić (SRB) |
| 3 December 2018; 18:00 | Behnke 8 | (11–14) | Buceschi 11 | Brest Arena, Brest; Attendance: 2,106; Referees: Mošorinski, Pandžić (SRB) |
| 3 December 2018; 18:00 | 1× (yellow card) 4× (suspension) | Report | 2× (yellow card) 4× (suspension) | Brest Arena, Brest; Attendance: 2,106; Referees: Mošorinski, Pandžić (SRB) |

| 3 December 2018; 21:00 | Czech Republic | 17–31 | Norway | Brest Arena, Brest; Attendance: 1,734; Referees: Bennani, Bennani (SWE) |
| 3 December 2018; 21:00 | Marčíková 4 | (10–20) | Aune, Løke 6 | Brest Arena, Brest; Attendance: 1,734; Referees: Bennani, Bennani (SWE) |
| 3 December 2018; 21:00 | 3× (yellow card) 1× (suspension) | Report | 2× (suspension) 1× (red card) | Brest Arena, Brest; Attendance: 1,734; Referees: Bennani, Bennani (SWE) |

| 5 December 2018; 18:00 | Germany | 30–28 | Czech Republic | Brest Arena, Brest; Attendance: 2,930; Referees: Vranes, Wenninger (AUT) |
| 5 December 2018; 18:00 | Schmelzer 7 | (16–16) | Luzumová 10 | Brest Arena, Brest; Attendance: 2,930; Referees: Vranes, Wenninger (AUT) |
| 5 December 2018; 18:00 | 2× (yellow card) 5× (suspension) | Report | 2× (yellow card) 4× (suspension) | Brest Arena, Brest; Attendance: 2,930; Referees: Vranes, Wenninger (AUT) |

| 5 December 2018; 21:00 | Norway | 23–31 | Romania | Brest Arena, Brest; Attendance: 2,782; Referees: Alpaidze, Berezkina (RUS) |
| 5 December 2018; 21:00 | Aune, Kristiansen 5 | (12–18) | Neagu 11 | Brest Arena, Brest; Attendance: 2,782; Referees: Alpaidze, Berezkina (RUS) |
| 5 December 2018; 21:00 | 3× (yellow card) 1× (suspension) | Report | 2× (yellow card) 1× (suspension) | Brest Arena, Brest; Attendance: 2,782; Referees: Alpaidze, Berezkina (RUS) |

== Main round ==
Points obtained against qualified teams from the same group will be taken over.

=== Group I ===
| Pos | Team | Pld | W | D | L | GF | GA | GD | Pts | Qualification |
|---|---|---|---|---|---|---|---|---|---|---|
| 1 | Russia | 5 | 4 | 0 | 1 | 141 | 131 | +10 | 8 | Semifinals |
| 2 | France (H) | 5 | 3 | 1 | 1 | 136 | 118 | +18 | 7 | Semifinals |
| 3 | Sweden | 5 | 2 | 1 | 2 | 139 | 132 | +7 | 5 | Fifth place game |
| 4 | Denmark | 5 | 2 | 0 | 3 | 123 | 143 | −20 | 4 (Note: Denmark 24–23 Montenegro) | |
| 5 | Montenegro | 5 | 2 | 0 | 3 | 124 | 128 | −4 | 4 | |
| 6 | Serbia | 5 | 1 | 0 | 4 | 131 | 142 | −11 | 2 | |

Source: EHF
Rules for classification: 1) points; 2) head-to-head points; 3) head-to-head goal difference; 4) head-to-head number of goals scored; 5) goal difference.
(H) Hosts
Notes:

| 6 December 2018; 18:00 | Denmark | 23–29 | France | Hall XXL, Nantes; Attendance: 5,296; Referees: Jurinović, Mrvica (CRO) |
| 6 December 2018; 18:00 | Woller 5 | (11–17) | Nze Minko 6 | Hall XXL, Nantes; Attendance: 5,296; Referees: Jurinović, Mrvica (CRO) |
| 6 December 2018; 18:00 | 3× (yellow card) 7× (suspension) 1× (red card) | Report | 3× (yellow card) 3× (suspension) | Hall XXL, Nantes; Attendance: 5,296; Referees: Jurinović, Mrvica (CRO) |

| 6 December 2018; 21:00 | Sweden | 28–30 | Montenegro | Hall XXL, Nantes; Attendance: 2,614; Referees: Bethmann, Tzaferopoulos (GRE) |
| 6 December 2018; 21:00 | Gulldén 6 | (14–18) | Radičević 9 | Hall XXL, Nantes; Attendance: 2,614; Referees: Bethmann, Tzaferopoulos (GRE) |
| 6 December 2018; 21:00 | 2× (yellow card) 4× (suspension) 1× (red card) | Report | 3× (yellow card) 6× (suspension) | Hall XXL, Nantes; Attendance: 2,614; Referees: Bethmann, Tzaferopoulos (GRE) |

Both matches were scheduled for 8 December, but moved back due to the Yellow vests movement.

| 9 December 2018; 15:00 | Sweden | 21–21 | France | Hall XXL, Nantes; Attendance: 7,241; Referees: Horváth, Márton (HUN) |
| 9 December 2018; 15:00 | Gulldén 6 | (14–11) | Lacrabère 5 | Hall XXL, Nantes; Attendance: 7,241; Referees: Horváth, Márton (HUN) |
| 9 December 2018; 15:00 | 2× (yellow card) 1× (suspension) | Report | 3× (yellow card) 3× (suspension) | Hall XXL, Nantes; Attendance: 7,241; Referees: Horváth, Márton (HUN) |

| 9 December 2018; 18:00 | Serbia | 25–29 | Russia | Hall XXL, Nantes; Attendance: 6,420; Referees: García, Marín (ESP) |
| 9 December 2018; 18:00 | Krpež Šlezak 7 | (13–16) | Dmitrieva 7 | Hall XXL, Nantes; Attendance: 6,420; Referees: García, Marín (ESP) |
| 9 December 2018; 18:00 | 2× (yellow card) 2× (suspension) | Report | 2× (yellow card) 5× (suspension) | Hall XXL, Nantes; Attendance: 6,420; Referees: García, Marín (ESP) |

| 10 December 2018; 18:00 | Denmark | 21–32 | Russia | Hall XXL, Nantes; Attendance: 2,812; Referees: Bethmann, Tzaferopoulos (GRE) |
| 10 December 2018; 18:00 | Heindahl 5 | (9–14) | Vyakhireva 9 | Hall XXL, Nantes; Attendance: 2,812; Referees: Bethmann, Tzaferopoulos (GRE) |
| 10 December 2018; 18:00 | 3× (yellow card) 6× (suspension) | Report | 3× (yellow card) 7× (suspension) 1× (red card) | Hall XXL, Nantes; Attendance: 2,812; Referees: Bethmann, Tzaferopoulos (GRE) |

| 10 December 2018; 21:00 | Serbia | 27–28 | Montenegro | Hall XXL, Nantes; Attendance: 2,307; Referees: Năstase, Stancu (ROU) |
| 10 December 2018; 21:00 | Krpež Šlezak 12 | (15–12) | Jauković, Mehmedović, Raičević 6 | Hall XXL, Nantes; Attendance: 2,307; Referees: Năstase, Stancu (ROU) |
| 10 December 2018; 21:00 | 2× (yellow card) 2× (suspension) | Report | 3× (yellow card) 3× (suspension) | Hall XXL, Nantes; Attendance: 2,307; Referees: Năstase, Stancu (ROU) |

| 12 December 2018; 15:45 | Denmark | 24–23 | Montenegro | Hall XXL, Nantes; Attendance: 3,811; Referees: Covalciuc, Covalciuc (MDA) |
| 12 December 2018; 15:45 | Hansen 6 | (15–11) | Radičević 7 | Hall XXL, Nantes; Attendance: 3,811; Referees: Covalciuc, Covalciuc (MDA) |
| 12 December 2018; 15:45 | 3× (yellow card) 5× (suspension) | Report | 3× (yellow card) 3× (suspension) | Hall XXL, Nantes; Attendance: 3,811; Referees: Covalciuc, Covalciuc (MDA) |

| 12 December 2018; 18:00 | Sweden | 39–30 | Russia | Hall XXL, Nantes; Attendance: 3,848; Referees: Horváth, Márton (HUN) |
| 12 December 2018; 18:00 | Hagman 17 | (18–17) | Samokhina 6 | Hall XXL, Nantes; Attendance: 3,848; Referees: Horváth, Márton (HUN) |
| 12 December 2018; 18:00 | 1× (yellow card) 2× (suspension) | Report | 3× (yellow card) 3× (suspension) | Hall XXL, Nantes; Attendance: 3,848; Referees: Horváth, Márton (HUN) |

| 12 December 2018; 21:00 | Serbia | 28–38 | France | Hall XXL, Nantes; Attendance: 7,046; Referees: García, Marín (ESP) |
| 12 December 2018; 21:00 | Kovačević, Krpež Šlezak, Pop-Lazić 5 | (14–18) | Nze Minko 9 | Hall XXL, Nantes; Attendance: 7,046; Referees: García, Marín (ESP) |
| 12 December 2018; 21:00 | 1× (yellow card) 2× (suspension) | Report | 1× (yellow card) 2× (suspension) | Hall XXL, Nantes; Attendance: 7,046; Referees: García, Marín (ESP) |

=== Group II ===
| Pos | Team | Pld | W | D | L | GF | GA | GD | Pts | Qualification |
|---|---|---|---|---|---|---|---|---|---|---|
| 1 | Netherlands | 5 | 4 | 0 | 1 | 128 | 126 | +2 | 8 | Semifinals |
| 2 | Romania | 5 | 3 | 0 | 2 | 140 | 132 | +8 | 6 (Note: Romania 2 Pts, +6 GD; Norway 2 Pts, +5 GD; Hungary 2 Pts, −11 GD) | Semifinals |
| 3 | Norway | 5 | 3 | 0 | 2 | 155 | 131 | +24 | 6 | Fifth place game |
| 4 | Hungary | 5 | 3 | 0 | 2 | 139 | 146 | −7 | 6 | |
| 5 | Germany | 5 | 2 | 0 | 3 | 132 | 137 | −5 | 4 | |
| 6 | Spain | 5 | 0 | 0 | 5 | 127 | 149 | −22 | 0 | |

Source: EHF
Rules for classification: 1) points; 2) head-to-head points; 3) head-to-head goal difference; 4) head-to-head number of goals scored; 5) goal difference.
Notes:

| 7 December 2018; 18:00 | Spain | 23–29 | Germany | Palais des Sports Jean Weille, Nancy; Attendance: 2,217; Referees: Alpaidze, Berezkina (RUS) |
| 7 December 2018; 18:00 | Martín 7 | (9–17) | Bölk, Geschke, Schmelzer 4 | Palais des Sports Jean Weille, Nancy; Attendance: 2,217; Referees: Alpaidze, Berezkina (RUS) |
| 7 December 2018; 18:00 | 1× (yellow card) 4× (suspension) 1× (red card) | Report | 2× (yellow card) 3× (suspension) | Palais des Sports Jean Weille, Nancy; Attendance: 2,217; Referees: Alpaidze, Berezkina (RUS) |

| 7 December 2018; 21:00 | Hungary | 25–38 | Norway | Palais des Sports Jean Weille, Nancy; Attendance: 2,180; Referees: Christiansen, Hansen (DEN) |
| 7 December 2018; 21:00 | Tóth 6 | (12–19) | Løke 7 | Palais des Sports Jean Weille, Nancy; Attendance: 2,180; Referees: Christiansen, Hansen (DEN) |
| 7 December 2018; 21:00 | 1× (yellow card) 4× (suspension) | Report | 1× (yellow card) 5× (suspension) | Palais des Sports Jean Weille, Nancy; Attendance: 2,180; Referees: Christiansen, Hansen (DEN) |

| 9 December 2018; 15:00 | Hungary | 26–25 | Germany | Palais des Sports Jean Weille, Nancy; Attendance: 2,926; Referees: Mošorinski, Pandžić (SRB) |
| 9 December 2018; 15:00 | Lukács 7 | (12–10) | Stolle 9 | Palais des Sports Jean Weille, Nancy; Attendance: 2,926; Referees: Mošorinski, Pandžić (SRB) |
| 9 December 2018; 15:00 | 2× (yellow card) 2× (suspension) | Report | 2× (yellow card) 1× (suspension) | Palais des Sports Jean Weille, Nancy; Attendance: 2,926; Referees: Mošorinski, Pandžić (SRB) |

| 9 December 2018; 18:00 | Netherlands | 29–24 | Romania | Palais des Sports Jean Weille, Nancy; Attendance: 3,016; Referees: Bonaventura, Bonaventura (FRA) |
| 9 December 2018; 18:00 | Abbingh, Bont 6 | (11–10) | Buceschi 8 | Palais des Sports Jean Weille, Nancy; Attendance: 3,016; Referees: Bonaventura, Bonaventura (FRA) |
| 9 December 2018; 18:00 | 1× (yellow card) 2× (suspension) | Report | 3× (yellow card) 2× (suspension) | Palais des Sports Jean Weille, Nancy; Attendance: 3,016; Referees: Bonaventura, Bonaventura (FRA) |

| 11 December 2018; 18:00 | Spain | 25–27 | Romania | Palais des Sports Jean Weille, Nancy; Attendance: 2,359; Referees: Vranes, Wenninger (AUT) |
| 11 December 2018; 18:00 | González 6 | (12–10) | Neagu 7 | Palais des Sports Jean Weille, Nancy; Attendance: 2,359; Referees: Vranes, Wenninger (AUT) |
| 11 December 2018; 18:00 | 1× (yellow card) 3× (suspension) | Report | 1× (yellow card) 3× (suspension) | Palais des Sports Jean Weille, Nancy; Attendance: 2,359; Referees: Vranes, Wenninger (AUT) |

| 11 December 2018; 21:00 | Netherlands | 16–29 | Norway | Palais des Sports Jean Weille, Nancy; Attendance: 1,803; Referees: Mošorinski, Pandžić (SRB) |
| 11 December 2018; 21:00 | Polman 4 | (7–15) | Jacobsen 5 | Palais des Sports Jean Weille, Nancy; Attendance: 1,803; Referees: Mošorinski, Pandžić (SRB) |
| 11 December 2018; 21:00 | 1× (yellow card) | Report | 1× (yellow card) 3× (suspension) | Palais des Sports Jean Weille, Nancy; Attendance: 1,803; Referees: Mošorinski, Pandžić (SRB) |

| 12 December 2018; 15:45 | Spain | 26–33 | Norway | Palais des Sports Jean Weille, Nancy; Attendance: 1,791; Referees: Bonaventura, Bonaventura (FRA) |
| 12 December 2018; 15:45 | López 5 | (17–18) | Oftedal 8 | Palais des Sports Jean Weille, Nancy; Attendance: 1,791; Referees: Bonaventura, Bonaventura (FRA) |
| 12 December 2018; 15:45 | 1× (yellow card) 5× (suspension) 1× (red card) | Report | 1× (yellow card) 1× (suspension) | Palais des Sports Jean Weille, Nancy; Attendance: 1,791; Referees: Bonaventura, Bonaventura (FRA) |

| 12 December 2018; 18:00 | Hungary | 31–29 | Romania | Palais des Sports Jean Weille, Nancy; Attendance: 1,844; Referees: Bennani, Bennani (SWE) |
| 12 December 2018; 18:00 | Háfra, Schatzl 6 | (17–17) | Neagu 9 | Palais des Sports Jean Weille, Nancy; Attendance: 1,844; Referees: Bennani, Bennani (SWE) |
| 12 December 2018; 18:00 | 2× (yellow card) 4× (suspension) | Report | 1× (yellow card) 2× (suspension) | Palais des Sports Jean Weille, Nancy; Attendance: 1,844; Referees: Bennani, Bennani (SWE) |

| 12 December 2018; 21:00 | Netherlands | 27–21 | Germany | Palais des Sports Jean Weille, Nancy; Attendance: 2,104; Referees: Alpaidze, Berezkina (RUS) |
| 12 December 2018; 21:00 | Dulfer, Polman 6 | (13–11) | Geschke 5 | Palais des Sports Jean Weille, Nancy; Attendance: 2,104; Referees: Alpaidze, Berezkina (RUS) |
| 12 December 2018; 21:00 | 1× (yellow card) 1× (suspension) | Report | 1× (yellow card) | Palais des Sports Jean Weille, Nancy; Attendance: 2,104; Referees: Alpaidze, Berezkina (RUS) |

== Knockout stage ==
=== Bracket ===
Semifinals
14 December
Russia | 28
Romania | 22
14 December
Netherlands | 21
France | 27

Final
16 December
Russia | 21
France | 24
Third place
16 December
Romania | 20
Netherlands | 24

=== Fifth place game ===
| 14 December 2018; 14:00 | Sweden | 29–38 | Norway | AccorHotels Arena, Paris; Attendance: 8,639; Referees: Năstase, Stancu (ROU) |
| 14 December 2018; 14:00 | Lagerquist 7 | (14–22) | Kristiansen 6 | AccorHotels Arena, Paris; Attendance: 8,639; Referees: Năstase, Stancu (ROU) |
| 14 December 2018; 14:00 | 2× (yellow card) | Report | 2× (yellow card) 1× (suspension) | AccorHotels Arena, Paris; Attendance: 8,639; Referees: Năstase, Stancu (ROU) |

=== Semifinals ===
| 14 December 2018; 17:30 | Russia | 28–22 | Romania | AccorHotels Arena, Paris; Attendance: 8,122; Referees: Horváth, Márton (HUN) |
| 14 December 2018; 17:30 | Vyakhireva 13 | (16–15) | Dragut, Pintea 4 | AccorHotels Arena, Paris; Attendance: 8,122; Referees: Horváth, Márton (HUN) |
| 14 December 2018; 17:30 | 2× (yellow card) 2× (suspension) | Report | 2× (yellow card) 7× (suspension) | AccorHotels Arena, Paris; Attendance: 8,122; Referees: Horváth, Márton (HUN) |

| 14 December 2018; 21:00 | Netherlands | 21–27 | France | AccorHotels Arena, Paris; Attendance: 12,463; Referees: García, Marín (ESP) |
| 14 December 2018; 21:00 | Abbingh 7 | (11–12) | Nze Minko 6 | AccorHotels Arena, Paris; Attendance: 12,463; Referees: García, Marín (ESP) |
| 14 December 2018; 21:00 | 2× (yellow card) 2× (suspension) | Report | 2× (yellow card) 3× (suspension) | AccorHotels Arena, Paris; Attendance: 12,463; Referees: García, Marín (ESP) |

=== Third place game ===
| 16 December 2018; 14:00 | Romania | 20–24 | Netherlands | AccorHotels Arena, Paris; Attendance: 13,145; Referees: Vranes, Wenninger (AUT) |
| 16 December 2018; 14:00 | Ardean-Elisei 6 | (8–15) | Polman 7 | AccorHotels Arena, Paris; Attendance: 13,145; Referees: Vranes, Wenninger (AUT) |
| 16 December 2018; 14:00 | 1× (yellow card) 2× (suspension) | Report | 1× (yellow card) 1× (suspension) | AccorHotels Arena, Paris; Attendance: 13,145; Referees: Vranes, Wenninger (AUT) |

=== Final ===
| 16 December 2018; 17:30 | Russia | 21–24 | France | AccorHotels Arena, Paris; Attendance: 14,000; Referees: Christiansen, Hansen (DEN) |
| 16 December 2018; 17:30 | Vyakhireva 7 | (12–13) | Lacrabère 6 | AccorHotels Arena, Paris; Attendance: 14,000; Referees: Christiansen, Hansen (DEN) |
| 16 December 2018; 17:30 | 1× (yellow card) 3× (suspension) | Report | 2× (yellow card) 2× (suspension) 1× (red card) | AccorHotels Arena, Paris; Attendance: 14,000; Referees: Christiansen, Hansen (DEN) |

== Final ranking and statistics ==
| Qualified for the 2020 Summer Olympics |
| Qualified for the 2019 World Championship |

| Rank | Team |
|---|---|
| 1st place, gold medalist(s) | France |
| 2nd place, silver medalist(s) | Russia |
| 3rd place, bronze medalist(s) | Netherlands |
| 4 | Romania |
| 5 | Norway |
| 6 | Sweden |
| 7 | Hungary |
| 8 | Denmark |
| 9 | Montenegro |
| 10 | Germany |
| 11 | Serbia |
| 12 | Spain |
| 13 | Slovenia |
| 14 | Poland |
| 15 | Czech Republic |
| 16 | Croatia |

=== All Star Team ===
The All Star Team and awards were announced on 16 December 2018.

| Position | Player |
|---|---|
| Goalkeeper | Amandine Leynaud (FRA) |
| Right wing | Carmen Martín (ESP) |
| Right back | Alicia Stolle (GER) |
| Centre back | Stine Bredal Oftedal (NOR) |
| Left back | Noémi Háfra (HUN) |
| Left wing | Majda Mehmedović (MNE) |
| Pivot | Crina Pintea (ROU) |
| Best defense player | Kelly Dulfer (NED) |
| Most valuable player | Anna Vyakhireva (RUS) |

=== Top goalscorers ===
| Rank | Name | Team | Goals | Shots | % |
|---|---|---|---|---|---|
| 1 | Katarina Krpež Šlezak | Serbia | 50 | 70 | 71 |
| 2 | Eliza Buceschi | Romania | 45 | 67 | 67 |
| 3 | Cristina Neagu | Romania | 44 | 82 | 54 |
| 4 | Anna Vyakhireva | Russia | 43 | 66 | 65 |
| 5 | Estelle Nze Minko | France | 38 | 46 | 83 |
| 6 | Estavana Polman | Netherlands | 36 | 73 | 49 |
| 7 | Nathalie Hagman | Sweden | 35 | 50 | 70 |
| 7 | Jovanka Radičević | Montenegro | 35 | 51 | 69 |
| 9 | Đurđina Jauković | Montenegro | 34 | 61 | 56 |
| 10 | Stine Bredal Oftedal | Norway | 33 | 55 | 60 |
| 10 | Crina Pintea | Romania | 33 | 52 | 63 |

=== Top goalkeepers ===
| Rank | Name | Team | % | Saves | Shots |
|---|---|---|---|---|---|
| 1 | Silje Solberg | Norway | 40 | 45 | 112 |
| 2 | Laura Glauser | France | 36 | 41 | 114 |
| 2 | Amandine Leynaud | France | 36 | 60 | 165 |
| 2 | Katrine Lunde | Norway | 36 | 57 | 160 |
| 5 | Maja Vojnović | Slovenia | 35 | 9 | 26 |
| 6 | Blanka Bíró | Hungary | 33 | 45 | 136 |
| 6 | Filippa Idéhn | Sweden | 33 | 61 | 184 |
| 6 | Tess Wester | Netherlands | 33 | 78 | 238 |
| 9 | Iulia Dumanska | Romania | 32 | 48 | 148 |
| 9 | Anna Sedoykina | Russia | 32 | 68 | 212 |
| 9 | Sandra Toft | Denmark | 32 | 46 | 145 |
