= List of indoor arenas in France =

The following is a list of indoor arenas in France with a capacity of at least 2,500 spectators, most of the arenas in this list are for multi use proposes and are used for popular sports such as individual sports like karate, judo, boxing as well as team sports like handball, basketball, volleyball. The arenas also serves as a venue for cultural and political events.

== Currently in use ==
| Location | Arena | Date built | Capacity | Image |
|---|---|---|---|---|
| Aix-en-Provence | Aréna du Pays d'Aix | 2017 | 7,000 | |
| Albertville | Halle Olympique | 1991 | 5,500 | |
| Amiens | Amiens Coliséum | 1996 | 3,000 | |
| Amnéville | Galaxie Amnéville | 1990 | 12,200 | |
| Antibes | Azur Arena | 2013 | 5,249 | |
| Besançon | Palais des sports Ghani-Yalouz | 1967 | 4,000 | |
| Brest | Brest Arena | 2014 | 6,000 | |
| Bordeaux | Arkéa Arena | 2018 | 8,000 | |
| Bordeaux | Patinoire de Mériadeck | 1981 | 4,800 | |
| Bordeaux | Vélodrome de Bordeaux | 1989 | 4,560 | |
| Boulazac | Le Pailio | 2008 | 5,200 | |
| Chalon-sur-Saône | Le Colisée | 2001 | 5,000 | |
| Chambéry | Le Phare | 2009 | 6,200 | |
| Cholet | La Meilleraie | 1987 | 5,191 | |
| Clermont-Ferrand | Clermont-Ferrand Sports Hall | 1970 | 5,000 | |
| Dijon | Palais des sports | 2010 | 4,628 | |
| Dunkirk | Stade des Flandres | 1968 | 2,500 | |
| Gravelines | Gravelines Sportica | 1986 | 3,500 | |
| Grenoble | Palais des Sports | 1967 | 12,000 | |
| Grenoble | Patinoire Polesud | 2001 | 3,496 | |
| Hyères | Espace 3000 | 1957 | 2,500 | |
| Le Havre | Dock Océane | 2000 | 3,598 | |
| Le Mans | Antarès | 1995 | 6,023 | |
| Levallois | Palais des sports Marcel-Cerdan | 1992 | 4,000 | |
| Liévin | Stade Couvert Régional | 1986 | 6,000 | |
| Lille | Stade Pierre-Mauroy | 2012 | 27,500 | |
| Lille | Zénith de Lille | 1994 | 7,000 | |
| Limoges | Palais des Sports de Beaublanc | 1981 | 6,500 | |
| Lyon | Palais des Sports de Gerland | 1962 | 5,910 | |
| Lyon | Halle Tony Garnier | 1988 | 17,000 | |
| Lyon | LDLC Arena | 2023 | 16,000 | |
| Marseille | Palais des Sports | 1988 | 5,800 | |
| Méribel | Méribel Ice Palace | 1991 | 2,500 | |
| Metz | Arènes de Metz | 2002 | 4,500 | |
| Montbéliard | Axone | 2009 | 6,400 | |
| Montpellier | Sud de France Arena | 2010 | 10,000 | |
| Montpellier | Palais des sports René-Bougnol | 1977 | 3,000 | |
| Nancy | Palais des Sports Jean Weille | 1999 | 6,027 | |
| Nanterre | Palais des Sports Maurice Thorez | 2015 | 3,000 | |
| Nanterre | Paris La Défense Arena | 2017 | 45,000 | |
| Nantes | Hall XXL | 2013 | 10,750 | |
| Nantes | Zénith Nantes Métropole | 1984 | 8,500 | |
| Nantes | Palais des Sports | 1973 | 5,500 | |
| Nice | Palais Nikaïa | 2001 | 9,000 | |
| Orléans | Palais des Sports | 1970 | 3,222 | |
| Orléans | Zénith d'Orléans | 1996 | 6,900 | |
| Orléans | CO'Met Arena | 2023 | 10,150 | |
| Paris | Accor Arena | 1984 | 20,300 | |
| Paris | Halle Georges Carpentier | 1960 | 5,009 | |
| Paris | Le Zénith | 1984 | 6,804 | |
| Paris | Dôme de Paris | 1960 | 4,600 | |
| Paris | Paris Aquatic Centre | 2024 | 5,000 | |
| Paris | Palais des Sports Robert Oubron | 1988 | 2,500 | |
| Paris | Stade Pierre de Coubertin | 1937 | 4,836 | |
| Paris | Porte de La Chapelle Arena | 2024 | 9,000 | |
| Pau | Palais des Sports de Pau | 1991 | 7,707 | |
| Reims | Complex Sportif René Tys | 1973 | 3,000 | |
| Roanne | Halle André Vacheresse | 1988 | 5,000 | |
| Rouen | Île Lacroix | 1992 | 2,747 | |
| Rouen | Kindarena | 2012 | 6,000 | |
| Strasbourg | Patinoire Iceberg | 2005 | 2,500 | |
| Strasbourg | Rhénus Sport | 1974 | 6,200 | |
| Strasbourg | Zénith de Strasbourg | 2008 | 12,079 | |
| Toulon | Palais des Sports de Toulon | 2006 | 4,200 | |
| Vichy | Gymnase Pierre Coulon | | 3,300 | |
| Villeurbanne | Astroballe | 1995 | 5,556 | |
| Trélazé | Arena Loire | 2013 | 6,600 | |

== See also ==
- List of football stadiums in France
- List of indoor arenas by capacity
- Lists of stadiums
