= Burcea =

Burcea is a Romanian surname. Notable people with the surname include:

- Bogdan Burcea (born 1972), Romanian handball coach and sports lecturer
- Florina-Cristina Burcea-Zamfir (born 1989), Romanian handball player, wife of Bogdan Burcea
- Stelian Burcea (born 1983), Romanian rugby union player
