= 2017–18 Women's EHF Cup =

European handball tournament

Women's EHF Cup
- 2017–18

Tournament information
- Sport: Handball
- Dates: 8 September 2017–11 May 2018
- Teams: 48+6 (qualification stage); 16 (group stage)

Final positions
- Champions: (Romania) SCM Craiova
- Runner-up: (Norway) Vipers Kristiansand

Tournament statistics
- Top scorer(s): (Norway) Linn Jørum Sulland (78 goals)

The 2017–18 Women's EHF Cup was the 37th edition of EHF's second-tier women's handball competition. It started on 8 September 2017.

SCM Craiova defeated Vipers Kristiansand 52–51 in the final to win their first title.

== Overview ==
=== Team allocation ===
The labels in the parentheses show how each team qualified for the place of its starting round:

- TH: Title holders
- CWC: EHF Women's Cup Winners' Cup holders
- 1st, 2nd, 3rd, 4th, 5th, 6th, etc.: League position
- CW: Domestic cup winners
- CR: Domestic cup runners-up
- CL QT: Losers from the Champions League qualification stage.
- CL Group: Losers from the Champions League group stage.

Group stage
(Poland) Vistal Gdynia (4th CL Group A)	(France) Brest Bretagne Handball (4th CL Group B)	(Norway) Larvik HK (4th CL Group C)	(Norway) Vipers Kristiansand (4th CL Group D)
Round 3
(Denmark) Randers HK (CW)	(Hungary) Érd HC (3rd)	(Croatia) Podravka Vegeta (2nd CL QT1)	(Sweden) H 65 Höör (2nd CL QT2)
(Russia) Lada (2nd)	(Romania) SCM Craiova (CR)	(Belarus) HC Gomel (3rd CL QT1)	(Austria) Hypo Niederösterreich (3rd CL QT2)
Round 2
(Denmark) København Håndbold (2nd)	(Russia) Zvezda Zvenigorod (4th)	(Romania) HC Zalău (3rd)	(Czech Republic) DHK Baník Most (1st)
(Denmark) Viborg HK (4th)	(Russia) Astrakhanochka (6th)	(Germany) TusSies Metzingen (3rd)	(Turkey) Kastamonu Belediyesi (4th CL QT1)
(Hungary) DKKA Dunaujvaros KA (4th)	(Norway) Glassverket IF (3rd)	(Germany) Buxtehuder SV (4th)	(Spain) Mecalia Atlético Guardés (4th CL QT2)
(Hungary) Debreceni VSC-TVP (Cup 3rd)	(Norway) Tertnes Bergen (CR)	(France) Issy Paris Hand (3rd)	
(Russia) Kuban (3rd)	(Romania) HC Dunărea Brăila (2nd)	(France) ES Besançon Feminin HB (4th)	
Round 1
(Denmark) Silkeborg-Voel KFUM (5th)	(Poland) Metraco Zagłębie Lubin (2nd)	(Ukraine) Galychanka (1st)	(Greece) O.F.N. Ionias (1st)
(Hungary) Váci NKSE (5th)	(Poland) KRAM Start Elbląg (3rd)	(Czech Republic) DHC Slavia Prague	(Belgium) HB Sint-Truiden
(Norway) Byåsen Handball Elite (4th)	(Turkey) Ankara Yenimahalle BSK (2nd)	(Switzerland) LC Brühl Handball (1st)	(Azerbaijan) Nur Mingechavir
(Romania) CSM Roman (5th)	(Spain) Super Amara Bera Bera (2nd)	(Switzerland) LK Zug (2nd)	(Kosovo) KHF Prishtina
(Germany) HSG Blomberg-Lippe (9th)	(Netherlands) Succes Schoonmaak/VOC (1st)	(Belarus) HC BNTU-BelAZ Minsk	(Israel) HC Holon
(France) Cercle Dijon Bourgogne (5th)	(Netherlands) Morrenhof Jansen/Dalfsen (2nd)	(Portugal) Colégio de Gaia (1st)	(Bosnia and Herzegovina) HŽRK Grude
(Sweden) Lugi HF	(Serbia) ŽRK Medicinar	(Italy) Jomi Salerno (1st)	(Cyprus) AC Latsia Nicosia

== Round and draw dates ==
The schedule of the competition was as follows (all draws were held at the EHF headquarters in Vienna, Austria):

Phase	Round	Draw date	First leg	Second leg
Qualification	First qualifying round	18 July 2017	9–10 September 2017	16–17 September 2017
Qualification	Second qualifying round	18 July 2017	14–15 October 2017	21–22 October 2017
Qualification	Third qualifying round	24 October 2017	11–12 November 2017	18–19 November 2017
Group stage	Matchday 1	23 November 2017	6–7 January 2018	
Group stage	Matchday 2	23 November 2017	13–14 January 2018	
Group stage	Matchday 3	23 November 2017	20–21 January 2018	
Group stage	Matchday 4	23 November 2017	27–28 January 2018	
Group stage	Matchday 5	23 November 2017	3–4 February 2018	
Group stage	Matchday 6	23 November 2017	10–11 February 2018	
Knockout phase	Quarter-finals	13 February 2018	3–4 March 2018	10–11 March 2018
Knockout phase	Semi finals	13 February 2018	7–8 April 2018	14–15 April 2018
Knockout phase	Final	17 April 2018	5–6 May 2018	12–13 May 2018

== Qualification stage ==
=== Round 1 ===
There is 28 teams participating in round 1.

Team 1	Agg.	Team 2	1st leg	2nd leg
KHF Prishtina (Kosovo)	26–66^{1}	(Switzerland) LC Brühl Handball	11–34	15–32
Váci NKSE (Hungary)	90–35^{2}	(Israel) HC Holon	46–17	44–18
Metraco Zagłębie Lubin (Poland)	80–47^{3}	(Switzerland) LK Zug	37–24	43–23
HSG Blomberg-Lippe (Germany)	88–35	(Belgium) HB Sint-Truiden	46–19	42–16
CSM Roman (Romania)	82–34^{4}	(Bosnia and Herzegovina) HŽRK Grude	40–15	42–19
Silkeborg-Voel KFUM (Denmark)	80–20^{5}	(Cyprus) AC Latsia Nicosia	44–12	36–8
Cercle Dijon Bourgogne (France)	51–40^{6}	(Italy) Jomi Salerno	27–18	24–22
Super Amara Bera Bera (Spain)	57–48	(Portugal) Colégio de Gaia	26–25	31–23
DHC Slavia Prague (Czech Republic)	48–49^{7}	(Belarus) HC BNTU-BelAZ Minsk	24–25	24–24
KRAM Start Elbląg (Poland)	47–62^{8}	(Norway) Byåsen Handball Elite	29–34	18–28
ŽRK Medicinar (Serbia)	63–61^{9}	(Netherlands) Succes Schoonmaak/VOC	34–33	29–28
Galychanka (Ukraine)	46–52	(Netherlands) Morrenhof Jansen/Dalfsen	26–22	20–30
Ankara Yenimahalle BSK (Turkey)	61–46^{10}	(Greece) O.F.N. Ionias	31–24	30–22
Nur Mingechavir (Azerbaijan)	53–51^{11}	(Sweden) Lugi HF	24–24	29–27

Notes

^{1} Both legs were hosted by KHF Prishtina.
^{2} Both legs were hosted by Váci NKSE.
^{3} Both legs were hosted by Metraco Zagłębie Lubin.
^{4} Both legs were hosted by CSM Roman.
^{5} Both legs were hosted by Silkeborg-Voel KFUM.
^{6} Both legs were hosted by Cercle Dijon Bourgogne.
^{7} Both legs were hosted by DHC Slavia Prague.
^{8} Both legs were hosted by Byåsen Handball Elite.
^{9} Both legs were hosted by ŽRK Medicinar.
^{10} Both legs were hosted by Ankara Yenimahalle BSK.
^{11} Both legs were hosted by Nur Mingechavir.

=== Round 2 ===
There is 32 teams participating in round 2.

14 teams who qualified from round 1 and 18 teams joining the draw.

Team 1	Agg.	Team 2	1st leg	2nd leg
Metraco Zagłębie Lubin (Poland)	45–49	(Hungary) Debreceni VSC-TVP	25–23	20–26
Morrenhof Jansen/Dalfsen (Netherlands)	48–60	(Czech Republic) DHK Baník Most	28–32	20–28
HC BNTU-BelAZ Minsk (Belarus)	52–52^{1} (a)	(Norway) Tertnes Bergen	26–23	26–29
Cercle Dijon Bourgogne (France)	50–60	(Denmark) København Håndbold	23–32	27–28
Silkeborg-Voel KFUM (Denmark)	50–54	(France) ES Besançon Feminin HB	27–26	23–28
HC Zalău (Romania)	60–50	(Turkey) Ankara Yenimahalle BSK	26–21	34–29
Kastamonu Belediyesi (Turkey)	59–57^{2}	(Spain) Super Amara Bera Bera	35–35	24–22
DKKA Dunaujvaros KA (Hungary)	56–51	(Romania) CSM Roman	31–24	25–27
Byåsen Handball Elite (Norway)	48–46	(Romania) HC Dunărea Brăila	28–18	20–28
Buxtehuder SV (Germany)	55–55 (a)	(Hungary) Váci NKSE	33–26	22–29
TusSies Metzingen (Germany)	60–51	(Germany) HSG Blomberg-Lippe	32–24	28–27
LC Brühl Handball (Switzerland)	53–53^{3} (a)	(Russia) Zvezda Zvenigorod	25–29	28–24
Nur Mingechavir (Azerbaijan)	36–81^{4}	(Denmark) Viborg HK	21–38	15–43
Issy Paris Hand (France)	49–39^{5}	(Norway) Glassverket IF	23–22	26–17
Astrakhanochka (Russia)	61–55^{6}	(Spain) Mecalia Atlético Guardés	28–25	33–30
ŽRK Medicinar (Serbia)	45–68^{7}	(Russia) Kuban	23–33	22–35

Notes

^{1} Both legs were hosted by Tertnes Bergen.
^{2} Both legs were hosted by Kastamonu Belediyesi.
^{3} Both legs were hosted by Zvezda Zvenigorod.
^{4} Both legs were hosted by Viborg HK.
^{5} Order of legs reversed after original draw.
^{6} Both legs were hosted by CB Atlético Guardés.
^{7} Both legs were hosted by Kuban.

=== Round 3 ===
Team 1	Agg.	Team 2	1st leg	2nd leg
Byåsen Handball Elite (Norway)	59–50	(Belarus) HC Gomel	32–28	27–22
HC BNTU-BelAZ Minsk (Belarus)	46–48	(Denmark) Randers HK	23–22	23–26
Viborg HK (Denmark)	52–38	(Croatia) Podravka Vegeta	32–17	20–21
Lada (Russia)	66–54	(France) ES Besançon Feminin HB	30–22	36–32
SCM Craiova (Romania)	48–45	(Hungary) Debreceni VSC-TVP	24–19	24–26
Váci NKSE (Hungary)	53–62	(Turkey) Kastamonu Belediyesi	24–26	29–36
Astrakhanochka (Russia)	58–60	(Russia) Kuban	29–27	29–33
H 65 Höör (Sweden)	53–52	(Germany) TusSies Metzingen	24–24	29–28
København Håndbold (Denmark)	45–41	(Hungary) Dunaújvárosi KKA	22–21	23–20
Érd HC (Hungary)	51–52	(France) Issy Paris Hand	31–21	20–31
Zvezda Zvenigorod (Russia)	53–61	(Czech Republic) DHK Baník Most	31–28	22–33
Hypo Niederösterreich (Austria)	43–59	(Romania) HC Zalău	22–30	21–29

== Group stage ==
The seedings were announced on 23 November 2017.

Teams in the draw will be protected against meeting teams from the same country in the same group. In each group, teams played against each other in a double round-robin format, with home and away matches.

=== Group A ===
Pos	Team	Pld	W	D	L	GF	GA	GD	Pts	Qualification	BRE	CRA	KUB	RAN
1	(France) Brest Bretagne Handball	6	4	0	2	139	117	+22	8 (Note: Brest Bretagne Handball HC 40–38 SCM Craiova)	Quarterfinals	—	25–22	30–16	23–15
2	(Romania) SCM Craiova	6	4	0	2	146	134	+12	8	Quarterfinals	16–15	—	30–24	23–17
3	(Russia) Kuban	6	3	0	3	141	155	−14	6		22–28	28–26	—	28–21
4	(Denmark) Randers HK	6	1	0	5	124	144	−20	2		26–18	25–29	20–23	—

Source: EHF
Rules for classification: See Tiebreakers

=== Group B ===
Pos	Team	Pld	W	D	L	GF	GA	GD	Pts	Qualification	LAD	VIP	PAR	KOE
1	(Russia) Lada	6	5	0	1	160	147	+13	10	Quarterfinals	—	29–24	25–24	27–24
2	(Norway) Vipers Kristiansand	6	3	0	3	156	150	+6	6	Quarterfinals	30–21	—	22–23	30–23
3	(France) Issy Paris Hand	6	2	1	3	146	156	−10	5		17–27	24–25	—	28–28
4	(Denmark) København Håndbold	6	1	1	4	162	171	−9	3		28–31	30–25	29–30	—

Source: EHF
Rules for classification: See Tiebreakers

=== Group C ===
Pos	Team	Pld	W	D	L	GF	GA	GD	Pts	Qualification	KAS	VIB	BYA	VIS
1	(Turkey) Kastamonu Belediyesi	6	5	0	1	165	146	+19	10	Quarterfinals	—	28–15	30–28	28–25
2	(Denmark) Viborg HK	6	4	0	2	157	148	+9	8	Quarterfinals	26–28	—	29–26	27–24
3	(Norway) Byåsen Håndball Elite	6	3	0	3	166	152	+14	6		26–24	21–28	—	41–19
4	(Poland) Vistal Gdynia	6	0	0	6	137	179	−42	0		26–27	21–32	22–24	—

Source: EHF
Rules for classification: See Tiebreakers

=== Group D ===
Pos	Team	Pld	W	D	L	GF	GA	GD	Pts	Qualification	LAR	ZAL	HOO	BAN
1	(Norway) Larvik HK	6	4	1	1	166	146	+20	9	Quarterfinals	—	28–23	34–23	34–29
2	(Romania) HC Zalău	6	4	0	2	147	151	−4	8	Quarterfinals	25–22	—	24–21	31–28
3	(Sweden) H 65 Höör	6	3	0	3	158	150	+8	6		25–27	30–19	—	28–27
4	(Czech Republic) DHK Baník Most	6	0	1	5	146	170	−24	1		21–21	22–25	19–31	—

Source: EHF
Rules for classification: See Tiebreakers

== Knockout stage ==
The draw event was held at the EHF Office in Vienna on Tuesday 13 February at 11:00 hrs. The draw had determined the quarter-final and also the semi-final pairings.

=== Quarterfinals ===
==== Seeding ====
Pot 1	Pot 2
(France) Brest Bretagne Handball (Norway) Larvik HK (Russia) Lada (Turkey) Kastamonu Belediyesi	(Denmark) Viborg HK (Norway) Vipers Kristiansand (Romania) HC Zalău (Romania) SCM Craiova

The first quarter-final leg was scheduled for 3 March, while the second leg followed one week later.

Team 1	Agg.	Team 2	1st leg	2nd leg
SCM Craiova (Romania)	49–48	(Russia) Lada	23–25	26–23
Vipers Kristiansand (Norway)	55–51	(France) Brest Bretagne Handball	26–17	29–34
Viborg HK (Denmark)	55–47	(Norway) Larvik HK	28–21	27–26
HC Zalău (Romania)	53–55	(Turkey) Kastamonu Belediyesi	29–28	24–27

==== Matches ====
3 March 2018; 17:00 (UTC+2)	SCM Craiova (Romania)	23–25	Lada (Russia)	Polyvalent Hall, Craiova; Attendance: 4,200; Referees: Lindenbaum, Laron (ISR)
3 March 2018; 17:00 (UTC+2)	Florianu 8	(9–15)	Dmitrieva 8	Polyvalent Hall, Craiova; Attendance: 4,200; Referees: Lindenbaum, Laron (ISR)
3 March 2018; 17:00 (UTC+2)	3× (yellow card) 5× (suspension)	Report	1× (yellow card) 8× (suspension)	Polyvalent Hall, Craiova; Attendance: 4,200; Referees: Lindenbaum, Laron (ISR)

10 March 2018; 16:00 (UTC+4)	Lada (Russia)	23–26	(Romania) SCM Craiova	Olymp Sportkomplex, Togliatti; Attendance: 2,500; Referees: Chrzan, Janas (POL)
10 March 2018; 16:00 (UTC+4)	Dmitrieva, Novoselova 4	(8–14)	Ardean-Elisei 9	Olymp Sportkomplex, Togliatti; Attendance: 2,500; Referees: Chrzan, Janas (POL)
10 March 2018; 16:00 (UTC+4)	3× (yellow card) 2× (suspension)	Report	3× (yellow card) 3× (suspension)	Olymp Sportkomplex, Togliatti; Attendance: 2,500; Referees: Chrzan, Janas (POL)

SCM Craiova won 49–48 on aggregate.

3 March 2018; 17:00 (UTC+2)	HC Zalău (Romania)	29–28	(Turkey) Kastamonu Belediyesi	Gheorge Tadici Sports Hall, Zalău; Attendance: 915; Referees: Di Domenico, Fornasier (ITA)
3 March 2018; 17:00 (UTC+2)	Rob 9	(12–15)	Marić, Uskova 6	Gheorge Tadici Sports Hall, Zalău; Attendance: 915; Referees: Di Domenico, Fornasier (ITA)
3 March 2018; 17:00 (UTC+2)	2× (yellow card) 2× (suspension)	Report	3× (yellow card) 5× (suspension)	Gheorge Tadici Sports Hall, Zalău; Attendance: 915; Referees: Di Domenico, Fornasier (ITA)

11 March 2018; 17:00 (UTC+3)	Kastamonu Belediyesi (Turkey)	27–24	(Romania) HC Zalău	Atatürk Sports Hall, Kastamonu; Attendance: 1,500; Referees: Accoto Martins, Accoto Martins (POR)
11 March 2018; 17:00 (UTC+3)	İskenderoğlu 7	(16–11)	Rob, Tămaș 5	Atatürk Sports Hall, Kastamonu; Attendance: 1,500; Referees: Accoto Martins, Accoto Martins (POR)
11 March 2018; 17:00 (UTC+3)	2× (yellow card) 6× (suspension)	Report	1× (yellow card) 2× (suspension)	Atatürk Sports Hall, Kastamonu; Attendance: 1,500; Referees: Accoto Martins, Accoto Martins (POR)

Kastamonu Belediyesi won 55–53 on aggregate.

3 March 2018; 17:00 (UTC+1)	Vipers Kristiansand (Norway)	26–17	(France) Brest Bretagne Handball	Aquarama Kristiansand, Kristiansand; Attendance: 1,134; Referees: Lončar, Lončar (CRO)
3 March 2018; 17:00 (UTC+1)	Lunde-Borgersen 8	(12–10)	Pineau 5	Aquarama Kristiansand, Kristiansand; Attendance: 1,134; Referees: Lončar, Lončar (CRO)
3 March 2018; 17:00 (UTC+1)	1× (yellow card) 3× (suspension)	Report	2× (yellow card) 5× (suspension) 1× (red card)	Aquarama Kristiansand, Kristiansand; Attendance: 1,134; Referees: Lončar, Lončar (CRO)

10 March 2018; 20:30 (UTC+1)	Brest Bretagne Handball (France)	34–29	(Norway) Vipers Kristiansand	Brest Arena, Brest; Attendance: 3,348; Referees: Bolic, Hurich (AUT)
10 March 2018; 20:30 (UTC+1)	Pineau 7	(18–17)	Sulland 10	Brest Arena, Brest; Attendance: 3,348; Referees: Bolic, Hurich (AUT)
10 March 2018; 20:30 (UTC+1)	2× (yellow card) 3× (suspension)	Report	2× (yellow card) 5× (suspension)	Brest Arena, Brest; Attendance: 3,348; Referees: Bolic, Hurich (AUT)

Vipers Kristiansand won 55–51 on aggregate.

3 March 2018; 17:00 (UTC+1)	Viborg HK (Denmark)	28–21	(Norway) Larvik HK	Vibocold Arena, Viborg; Attendance: 1,564; Referees: Pech, Vagvölgyi (HUN)
3 March 2018; 17:00 (UTC+1)	Nørgaard 9	(9–8)	Breistøl 6	Vibocold Arena, Viborg; Attendance: 1,564; Referees: Pech, Vagvölgyi (HUN)
3 March 2018; 17:00 (UTC+1)	3× (yellow card) 5× (suspension)	Report	2× (yellow card) 5× (suspension)	Vibocold Arena, Viborg; Attendance: 1,564; Referees: Pech, Vagvölgyi (HUN)

10 March 2018; 17:00 (UTC+1)	Larvik HK (Norway)	26–27	(Denmark) Viborg HK	Boligmappa Arena, Larvik; Attendance: 652; Referees: Geraets, Geraets (NED)
10 March 2018; 17:00 (UTC+1)	Breistøl 8	(13–15)	Nørgaard 7	Boligmappa Arena, Larvik; Attendance: 652; Referees: Geraets, Geraets (NED)
10 March 2018; 17:00 (UTC+1)	1× (yellow card) 1× (suspension)	Report		Boligmappa Arena, Larvik; Attendance: 652; Referees: Geraets, Geraets (NED)

Viborg HK won 55–47 on aggregate.

=== Semifinals ===
The semi-finals were played in the first half of April.

Team 1	Agg.	Team 2	1st leg	2nd leg
Kastamonu Belediyesi (Turkey)	40–41	(Romania) SCM Craiova	22–23	18–18
Viborg HK (Denmark)	57–60	(Norway) Vipers Kristiansand	34–31	23–29

==== Matches ====
7 April 2018; 17:00	Kastamonu Belediyesi (Turkey)	22–23	(Romania) SCM Craiova	Atatürk Sports Hall, Kastamonu; Attendance: 1,300; Referees: Antić, Jakovljević (SRB)
7 April 2018; 17:00	Uskova 8	(15–11)	Țicu 7	Atatürk Sports Hall, Kastamonu; Attendance: 1,300; Referees: Antić, Jakovljević (SRB)
7 April 2018; 17:00	2× (yellow card) 4× (suspension)	Report	3× (yellow card) 4× (suspension)	Atatürk Sports Hall, Kastamonu; Attendance: 1,300; Referees: Antić, Jakovljević (SRB)

14 April 2018; 18:00	SCM Craiova (Romania)	18–18	(Turkey) Kastamonu Belediyesi	Polyvalent Hall, Craiova; Attendance: 4,215; Referees: Vitaku, Vitaku (KOS)
14 April 2018; 18:00	Țicu 6	(9−8)	Uskova, Marić 5	Polyvalent Hall, Craiova; Attendance: 4,215; Referees: Vitaku, Vitaku (KOS)
14 April 2018; 18:00	4× (yellow card) 3× (suspension)	Report	3× (yellow card) 3× (suspension)	Polyvalent Hall, Craiova; Attendance: 4,215; Referees: Vitaku, Vitaku (KOS)

SCM Craiova won 41–40 on aggregate.

7 April 2018; 16:00	Viborg HK (Denmark)	34–31	(Norway) Vipers Kristiansand	Vibocold Arena, Viborg; Attendance: 2,020; Referees: Bounouara, Sami (FRA)
7 April 2018; 16:00	Jørgensen 11	(18–16)	Sulland 6	Vibocold Arena, Viborg; Attendance: 2,020; Referees: Bounouara, Sami (FRA)
7 April 2018; 16:00	3× (yellow card) 3× (suspension)	Report	2× (yellow card) 2× (suspension)	Vibocold Arena, Viborg; Attendance: 2,020; Referees: Bounouara, Sami (FRA)

14 April 2018; 16:00	Vipers Kristiansand (Norway)	29–23	(Denmark) Viborg HK	Aquarama Kristiansand, Kristiansand; Attendance: 2,012; Referees: Arntsen, Røen (NOR)
14 April 2018; 16:00	Brattset 9	(15–14)	Jørgensen 8	Aquarama Kristiansand, Kristiansand; Attendance: 2,012; Referees: Arntsen, Røen (NOR)
14 April 2018; 16:00	4× (yellow card) 2× (suspension)	Report		Aquarama Kristiansand, Kristiansand; Attendance: 2,012; Referees: Arntsen, Røen (NOR)

Vipers Kristiansand won 60–57 on aggregate.

=== Final ===
Team 1	Agg.	Team 2	1st leg	2nd leg
Vipers Kristiansand (Norway)	51–52	(Romania) SCM Craiova	26–22	25–30

==== Matches ====
5 May 2018; 17:00	Vipers Kristiansand (Norway)	26–22	(Romania) SCM Craiova	Aquarama Kristiansand, Kristiansand; Attendance: 2,200; Referees: Kouz, Zhoba (UKR)
5 May 2018; 17:00	Kristiansen 9	(12–10)	Florianu 9	Aquarama Kristiansand, Kristiansand; Attendance: 2,200; Referees: Kouz, Zhoba (UKR)
5 May 2018; 17:00	3× (yellow card) 3× (suspension)	Report	3× (yellow card) 4× (suspension)	Aquarama Kristiansand, Kristiansand; Attendance: 2,200; Referees: Kouz, Zhoba (UKR)

11 May 2018; 18:30	SCM Craiova (Romania)	30–25	(Norway) Vipers Kristiansand	Polyvalent Hall, Craiova; Attendance: 4,215; Referees: Marić, Masić (SRB)
11 May 2018; 18:30	Țicu 11	(19–12)	Sulland 10	Polyvalent Hall, Craiova; Attendance: 4,215; Referees: Marić, Masić (SRB)
11 May 2018; 18:30	3× (yellow card) 3× (suspension)	Report	4× (yellow card) 1× (suspension)	Polyvalent Hall, Craiova; Attendance: 4,215; Referees: Marić, Masić (SRB)

SCM Craiova won 52–51 on aggregate.

== Top goalscorers ==
As of 11 May 2018

Rank	Player	Club	Goals
1	(Norway) Linn Jørum Sulland	(Norway) Vipers Kristiansand	78
2	(Romania) Cristina Florianu	(Romania) SCM Craiova	69
3	(Denmark) Ann Grete Nørgaard Østerballe	(Denmark) Viborg HK	65

== See also ==
- 2017–18 Women's EHF Champions League
