= Ana Maria Țicu =

Romanian handball player (born 1992)

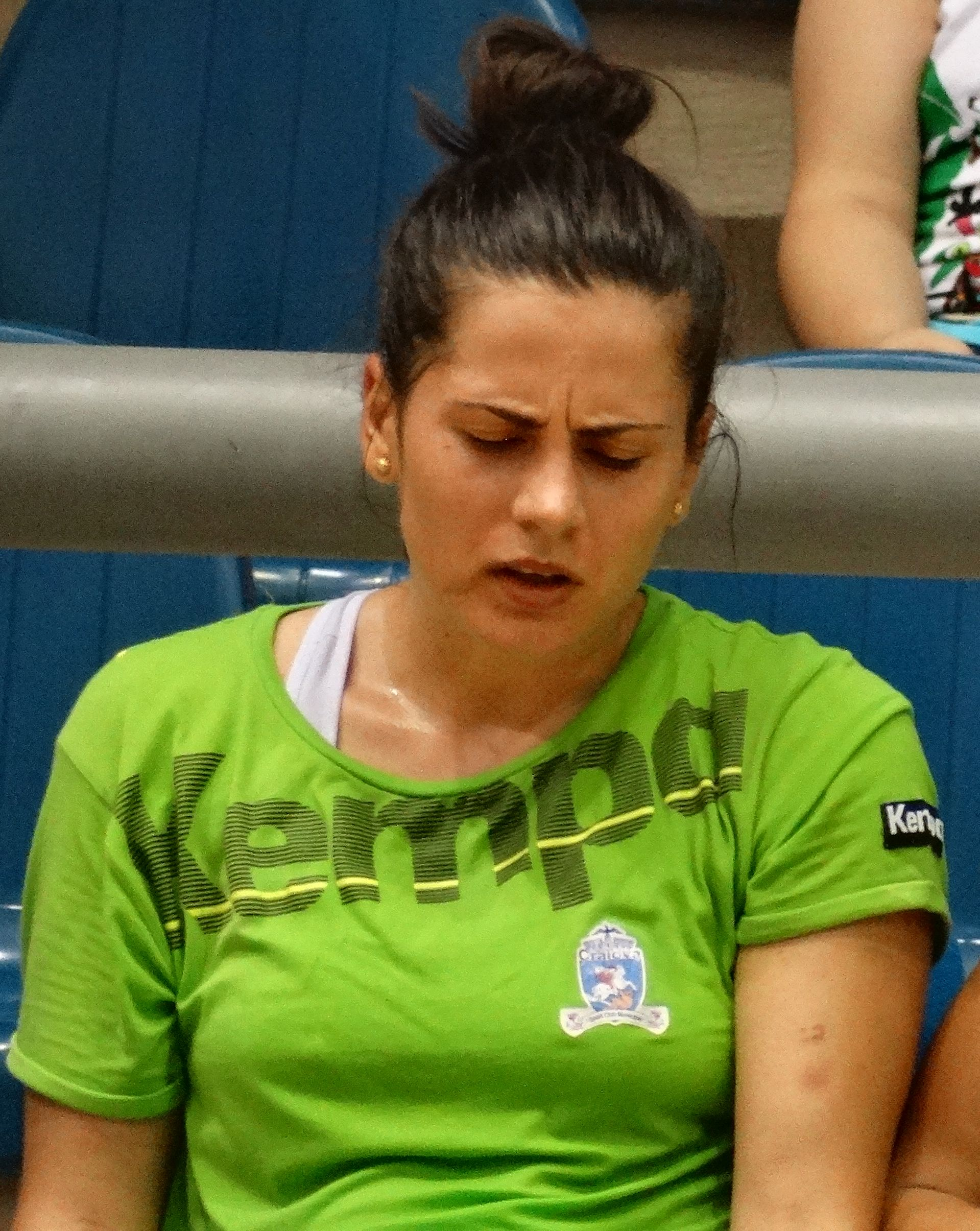

Personal information
- Nationality: Romanian
- Born: 23 February 1992 (age 34) Râmnicu Vâlcea, Romania
- Height: 1.70 m (5 ft 7 in)

Sport
- Sport: Handball
- Position: Centre back
- Current club: SCM Craiova
- Number: 11

Senior clubs
- Years: Team
- 2011–: SCM Craiova
National team
Years	Team	Apps	(Gls)
2013–	Romania	12	(9)

Ana Maria Țicu (née Apipie; born 23 February 1992) is a Romanian handballer for SCM Craiova and the Romanian national team.

She represented Romania at the 2020 European Women's Handball Championship.

She was given the award of Cetățean de onoare ("Honorary Citizen") of the city of Craiova in 2018.

== International honours ==
- EHF Cup:
  - Winner: 2018
