= Florentina Stanciu =

Romanian-born Icelandic handball player (born 1982)

Personal information
- Full name: Florentina Stanciu
- Born: 28 July 1982 (age 44) Craiova, Romania
- Height: 1.84 m (6 ft 0 in)

Sport
- Sport: Handball
- Position: Goalkeeper
- Current club: SCM Craiova
- Number: 16

Senior clubs
- Years: Team
- –2003: Universitatea Cluj-Napoca
- 2003–2004: Metz Handball
- 2004–2016: UMF Stjarnan
- 2016–: SCM Craiova
National team
| Years | Team | Apps | (Gls) |
| 1998–2009 | Romania | 36 | (0) |
| 2013–? | Iceland | | |

Florentina Stanciu (born 28 July 1982) is a Romanian-born Icelandic handballer who plays for SCM Craiova.

She was given the award of Cetățean de onoare ("Honorary Citizen") of the city of Craiova in 2018.

== International honours ==
- EHF Cup:
  - Winner: 2018
- EHF Cup Winners' Cup:
  - Semifinalist: 2004
- European Youth Championship:
  - Gold Medalist: 1999

== Individual awards ==
- All-Star Team Best Goalkeeper of the European Youth Championship: 1999
- All-Star Team Best Goalkeeper of the European Junior Championship: 2000
- All-Star Team Best Goalkeeper of the World Junior Championship: 2001
- Best Goalkeeper of the Icelandic Premier League: 2014
