= Dijana Mugoša =

Montenegrin handball player (born 1995)

Personal information
- Nationality: Montenegrin
- Born: 22 October 1995 (age 30) Podgorica, Montenegro, FR Yugoslavia
- Height: 1.73 m (5 ft 8 in)

Sport
- Sport: Handball
- Position: Left wing
- Current club: SCM Craiova
- Number: 21

Senior clubs
- Years: Team
- 2012–2013: WHC Biseri
- 2013–2015: Danilovgrad
- 2015–2016: Levalea 2010
- 2016–2017: ŽRK Nikšić
- 2017–2018: Ardesen GSK
- 2018–2019: IUVENTA Michalovce
- 2019–2022: RK Podravka Koprivnica
- 2022–2025: SCM Craiova
- 2025–2026: CSM Corona Brașov
- 2026–: SCM Craiova
National team
Years	Team	Apps	(Gls)
–	Montenegro	81	(207)

Dijana Mugoša (formerly Trivić; born 22 October 1995) is a Montenegrin handball player for SCM Craiova and the Montenegrin national handball team.

She represented Montenegro at the 2019 World Women's Handball Championship.
