= Hall XXL =

Indoor arena in Nantes, France

- Interactive map of Hall XXL
- Location: Nantes, France
- Coordinates: 47.258437°N 1.532571°W
- Owner: Nantes Metropolis
- Capacity: 10,750 (handball, concerts)
- Field size: 135 x 95 m

Construction
- Opened: August 2013

Tenant
- HBC Nantes

Hall XXL is a multi-purpose indoor arena in Nantes, France. Opened in August 2013, the arena is mainly used for exhibitions and sporting events.

== Location and access ==
Located in the north-east of the city, in the Beaujoire district, opposite the Beaujoire stadium, the Parc des Expositions is on the banks of the Erdre river, at the foot of the Jonelière and Beaujoire bridges, on the edge of the ring road.

=== Access ===
The Parc des Expositions is served by :

- tramway line 1 (terminus: Beaujoire for entrance 1 or Ranzay for entrance 2)
- bus routes C6, 75 and 80 (stop: Beaujoire for entrance 1 or Batignolles for entrance 2 or Ranzay for entrance 4)
- regional bus lines Aléop 348 and 360 (Halvêque stop).

Access by road is possible

- from Angers/Paris via the A11: "Carquefou-Boisbonne-La Beaujoire" exit, then via the Saint-Joseph de Porterie road
- from the Paris ring road: exit no. 40 "Porte de la Beaujoire".

== Events ==
- 2017 World Men's Handball Championship
- 2018 European Women's Handball Championship
- 2019 Men's European Volleyball Championship

== See also ==
- List of indoor arenas in France
