= Bogdan Burcea =

Romanian handball coach

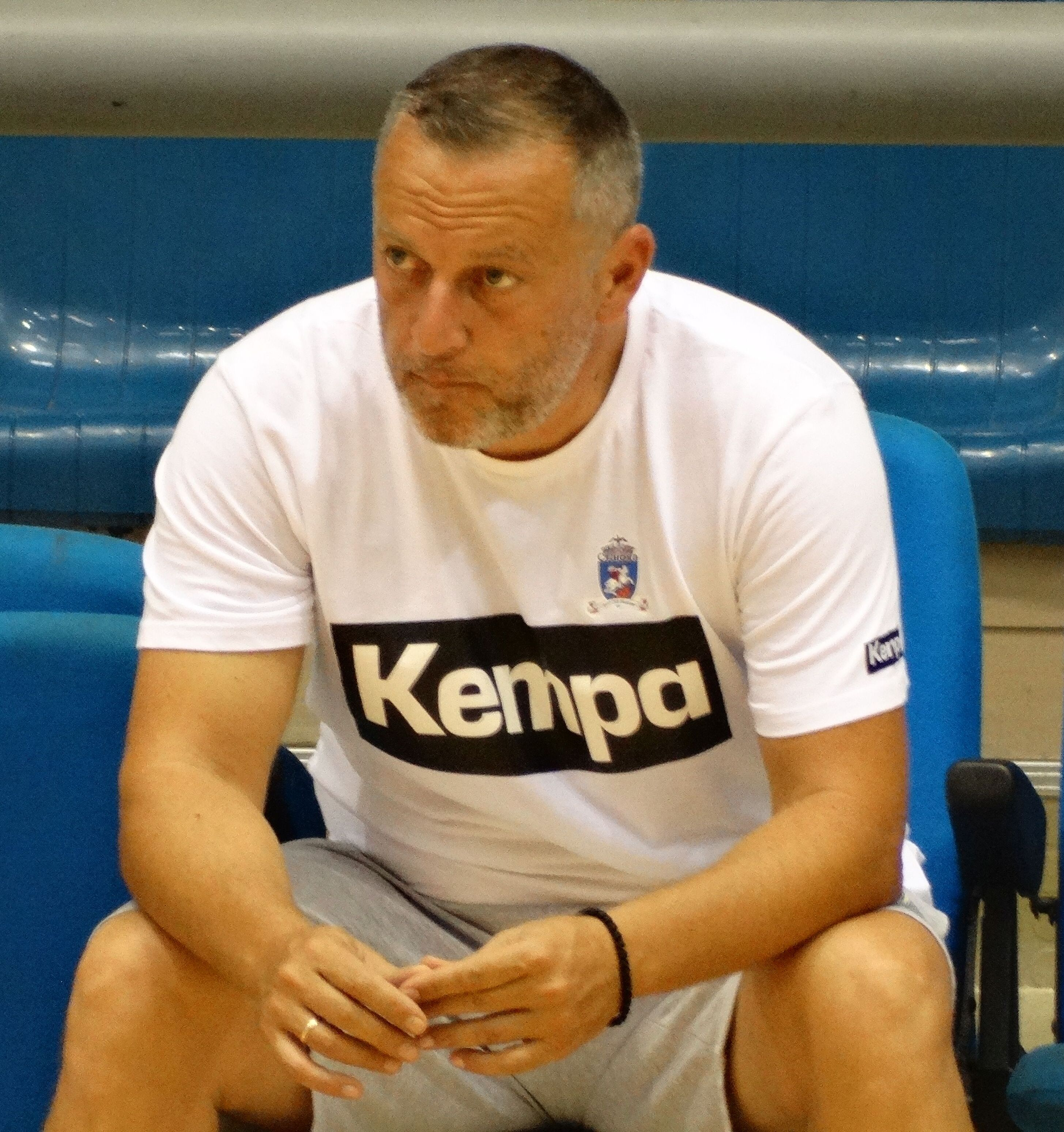

Personal information
- Full name: Bogdan George Burcea
- Nationality: Romanian
- Born: 8 May 1972 (age 54) Craiova, Romania

Sport
- Sport: Handball
- Current club: Corona Brașov (head coach)

Teams managed
- Years: Team
- 1995–1999: GS Elpides Dramas
- 1999–2000: Panathlitikos Dramas
- 2000–2002: CS Daewoo Craiova
- 2002–2003: Intercollege Panellinios
- 2003–2007: STIF Stranda Itrottarfelag
- 2007–2011: Hondbóltsfelagið Tjaldur
- 2011–2013: SCM Craiova
- 2012–2015: Romania (assistant coach)
- 2013–2016: Corona Brașov
- 2016–2024: SCM Craiova
- 2020: Romania
- 2022–2025: Romania (assistant coach)
- 2025–: Corona Brașov

Bogdan George Burcea (born 8 May 1972) is a current Romanian handball coach for Corona Brașov, and sports lecturer. He has been a member of the Consiliul Științei Sportului din România since 2012.

== International honours ==
- EHF Cup:
  - Gold Medalist: 2018
  - Bronze Medalist: 2016

== Individual awards ==
- Prosport Coach Of The Year in the Romanian Liga Națională: 2018

== Personal life ==
He comes from a family of handballers. His father, George Burcea, was coach of the female and male teams of the Greek club Filippos Veria. Bogdan's sister is Patricia Burcea-Apostolidou and his former wife is Adela Burcea, both handball players. He trained his ex-wife for several times in her handball career, in different countries.

Burcea holds doctorates and a Master of Performance degree in Physical Education and Sport, and a Master of International Business all from University of Craiova.

He was given the award of Cetățean de onoare ("Honorary Citizen") of the city of Craiova in 2018.

On 31 May 2019, he married his club player Cristina Zamfir.
