= Angie Geschke =

German handball player (born 1985)

Personal information
- Full name: Angie Birgit Geschke
- Nationality: German
- Born: 24 May 1985 (age 41) Lübeck, Germany
- Height: 1.77 m (5 ft 10 in)

Sport
- Sport: Handball
- Position: Left wing
- Current club: Retired

Youth career
- Years: Team
- –: TuS Lübeck 93
- –2000: SC Buntekuh Lübeck

Senior clubs
- Years: Team
- 2000–2007: Frankfurter HC
- 2007–2008: Randers HK
- 2008–2012: VfL Oldenburg
- 2012–2013: Vipers Kristiansand
- 2013: Bayer Leverkusen
- 2013–2019: VfL Oldenburg
- 2023: SG Obenstrohe/Dangastermoor
National team
Years	Team	Apps	(Gls)
2006–2019	Germany	110	(211)

Angie Birgit Geschke (born 24 May 1985) is a German former handball player for the German national team.

== Career ==
Geschke started playing handball at TuS Lübeck 93 at a young age, and later played youth handball at SC Buntekuh.

In 2000, she joined Frankfurter HC, where she won the 2003 DHB-Pokal and the 2004 German Championship. In the 2006-07 season she was the top scorer in the Handball-Bundesliga with 210 goals. The same season, she debuted for the German national team against Croatia.

In 2007, Geschke joined Danish side Randers HK. Only a year later, she returned to Germany to play for VfL Oldenburg. In 2012, she joined Norwegian team Vipers Kristiansand. Again, she returned to Germany after a year to join Bayer Leverkusen, this time in the summer of 2013. In September that same year, she moved back to VfL Oldenburg for personal reasons. In 2015-16 she was the top scorer of the Bundesliga again, with 237 goals.

In 2019, Geschke left Oldenburg once again to retire.

In the final parts of the 2022-23 season she made a comeback to the court to join SG Obenstrohe/Dangastermoor in the lower leagues.
