= Axone (arena) =

L'Axone
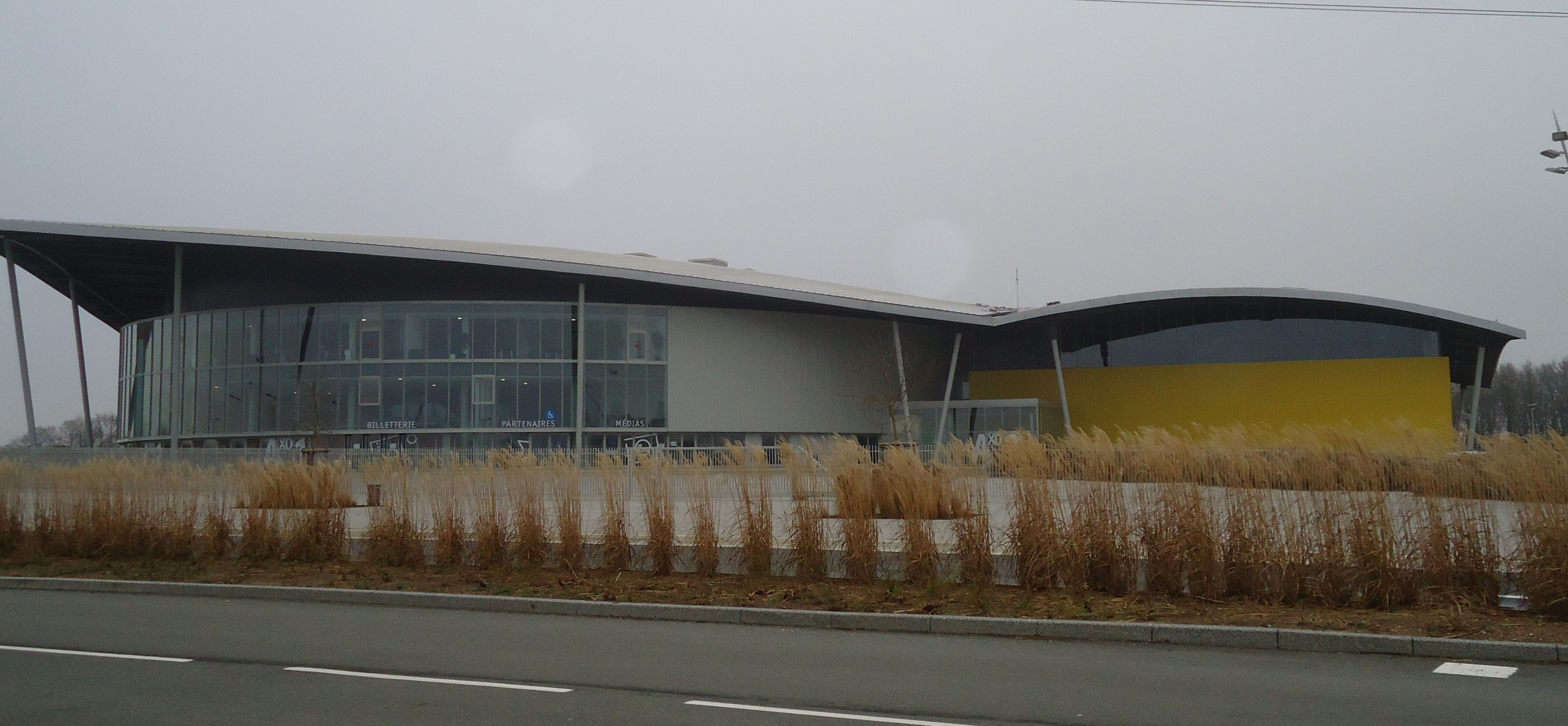

General information
- Type: Indoor Arena
- Location: 6 Rue du Commandant Pierre Rossel, Montbéliard, France
- Coordinates: 47°29′36″N 6°19′54″E
- Construction started: 2005
- Inaugurated: 5 April 2009
- Owner: Pays de Montbéliard Agglomération

Other information
- Seating capacity: 6400

References
- Official Website

L'Axone is an indoor arena, located in Montbéliard, France. It was inaugurated 5 April 2009. The capacity of the arena is 6,400 people.
