= Roxana Szölösi =

Romanian handball player (born 1992)

Personal information
- Full name: Roxana Daniela Szölösi
- Nationality: Romanian
- Born: 29 May 1992 (age 34) Baia Mare, Romania
- Height: 1.72 m (5 ft 8 in)

Sport
- Sport: Handball
- Position: Centre Back

Youth career
- Years: Team
- –2009: Extrem Baia Mare
- 2009–2011: CSȘ Zalău

Senior clubs
- Years: Team
- 2011–2019: HC Zalău
- 2019–: Minaur Baia Mare

Roxana Daniela Szölösi (née Rob; born 29 May 1992) is a Romanian handball player who plays for Minaur Baia Mare.

== International honours ==
- EHF Cup:
  - Finalist: 2012
