= SCM Craiova (women's handball) =

Romanian female handball team

- Full name: Sport Club Municipal Craiova
- Short name: SCM
- Founded: 2006; 20 years ago
- Arena: Sala Polivalentă
- Capacity: 4,215
- Head coach: Costică Buceschi
- League: Liga Națională
- 2025–26: Liga Națională, 9th of 12
- Club colours
Home	Away

Sport Club Municipal Craiova, commonly referred to as simply SCM Craiova, is a professional women's handball club in Craiova, Oltenia, Romania, that competes in the Liga Naţională.

== Kits ==
HOME
2015–17	2017–18

AWAY
2014–17	2017–18	2018-19

THIRD
2014–15	2015–16	2017–18	2018-19

== Honours ==
=== Domestic ===
==== Leagues ====
- Liga Națională
  - Runners-up: 2017–18

==== Cups ====
- Cupa României
  - Runners-up: 2016–2017
  - Third place: 2014–2015
  - Semifinals: 2015-2016, 2025–2026
- Supercupa României
  - Runners-up: 2016–2017

=== European ===
- EHF Cup
  - Winners (1): 2017–18

== Players ==
Squad for the 2026–27 season

Goalkeepers

- 1 (Montenegro) Marina Rajčić
- 16 (Romania) Raluca Rădoi
- 24 (Germany) Vanessa Fehr

Wingers
LW

- 21 (Montenegro) Dijana Mugoša
- 23 (Romania) Andreea Mihart

RW

- 11 (Norway) Ida Kallhovd
- 18 (Romania) Gabriela Tulea
- 31 (Romania) Orsolya Maria Mózes

Line players

- 20 (Norway) Maja Muri
- 55 (Netherlands) Tamara Haggerty
- 13 (Romania) Teodora Popescu

Back
LB

- 8 (Poland) Dominika Więckowska
- 26 (Romania) Nicoleta Tudorică
- 84 (Romania) Enryka Bodijar

CB

- 2 (Norway) Janne Håvelsrud Eklo
- 29 (Brazil) Francielle da Rocha
- 66 (Hungary) Rebeka Pődör

RB

- 25 (Iceland) Thea Imani Sturludóttir
- 71 (Romania) Alicia Gogîrlă

=== Transfers ===
Transfers for the season 2026-27

Joining

- (Hungary) Rebeka Pődör (CB) (from (Hungary) Szombathelyi KKA)
- (Montenegro) Dijana Mugoša (LW) (from (Romania) CSM Corona Brașov)
- (Germany) Vanessa Fehr (GK) (from (Germany) Bensheim)
- (Netherlands) Tamara Haggerty (PV) (from (Romania) CSM Corona Brașov)
- (Norway) Ida Kallhovd (RW) (from (Norway) Oppsal)
- (Poland) Dominika Więckowska (LB) (from (Poland) MKS Lublin)
- (Romania) Raluca Rădoi (GK) (from (Romania) CSM Corona Brașov)
- (Norway) Janne Håvelsrud Eklo (CB) (from (Norway) Byåsen HE)
- (Iceland) Thea Imani Sturludóttir (RB) (from (Iceland) Valur)
- (Norway) Maja Muri (P) (from (Norway) Molde Elite)

Leaving

- (Montenegro) Ivona Pavićević (LW)
- (Serbia) Željka Nikolić (RW)
- (Serbia) Katarina Bojičić (PV) (to (Serbia) ŽRK Crvena zvezda)
- (Croatia) Valentina Blažević (CB) (to (Romania) CSM Târgu Mureș)
- (Croatia) Ćamila Mičijević (LB)
- (Spain) Darly de Paula (GK) (retires)
- (Spain) Ainhoa Hernández (PV) (to (Italy) Handball Erice)
- (Poland) Natalia Nosek (RB)
- (Romania) Ioana Paval (GK)
- (Romania) Claudia Constantinescu (LB)
- (Turkey) Asli Iskit (LB)

=== Staff members ===
- (Romania) Head Coach: Costin Dumitrescu

== Notable former players ==
- (Romania) Florina-Cristina Burcea-Zamfir
- (Romania) Valentina Ardean-Elisei
- (Romania) Ildiko Kerekes Barbu
- (Romania) Alexandra Andrei
- (Romania) Carmen Ilie-Șelaru
- (Romania) Iulia Dumanska
- (Romania) Andreea Pricopi
- (Romania) Bianca Curmenț
- (Romania) Ana Maria Tănasie
- (Romania) Aneta Udriștioiu
- (Romania) Mădălina Zamfirescu
- (Romania) Cristina Florica
- (Romania) Nicoleta Dincă
- (Romania) Mihaela Tivadar
- (Romania) Ionica Munteanu
- (Romania) Mirela Pașca
- (Romania) Carmen Amariei
- (Romania) Patricia Vizitiu
- (Romania) Timea Tătar
- (Romania) Roxana Han
- (Romania) Daniela Băbeanu
- (Romania) Bianca Tiron
- (Brazil) Samira Rocha
- (Brazil) Ana-Paula Rodrigues-Belo
- (Brazil) Deonise Fachinello
- (Brazil) Mariana Costa
- (France) Laurisa Landre
- (Iceland) Florentina Stanciu
- (North Macedonia) Elena Gjeorgjievska
- (Montenegro) Bobana Klikovac
- (Montenegro) Đurđina Malović
- (Serbia) Katarina Krpež
- (Serbia) Jelena Trifunović
- (Serbia) Željka Nikolić
- (Serbia) Jelena Živković-Lavko
- (Croatia) Valentina Blažević
- (Croatia) Ćamila Mičijević
- (Croatia) Dejana Milosavljević
- (Croatia) Andrea Šerić
- (Ukraine) Yuliya Snopova
- (Ukraine) Iaroslava Burlachenko
- (Russia) Yulia Khavronina
- (Bulgaria) Ekaterina Dzhukeva
- (Norway) Hege Løken
- (Norway) Ane Eidem
- (Denmark) Melanie Bak

== Notable former coaches ==
- (Romania) Gheorghe Sbora
- (Romania) Victorina Bora
- (Romania) Aurelian Roșca
- (Romania) Carmen Amariei
- (Romania) Simona Gogîrlă
- (Romania) Grigore Albici
- (Romania) Bogdan Burcea
