= SPR Gdynia =

Polish handball club

Arka Gdynia
- Full name: Stowarzyszenie Piłki Ręcznej Arka Gdynia
- League: I liga
- Club colours

SPR Arka Gdynia is a women's handball club from Gdynia, Poland, two-time Polish Champions. As of 2022–23, it competes in the I liga.

In the past the club played as GTPR Gdynia and, for sponsorship reasons, as Łączpol Gdynia (2003–2009), Vistal Łączpol Gdynia (2009–2013), Vistal Gdynia (2013–2017). In 2018, it was renamed to Arka Gdynia, joining other departments of the Arka Gdynia club.

== Results ==
- Polish Championship:
  - Winners (2): 2012, 2017
  - Runners-Up (1): 2015
- Polish Women's Cup:
  - Winners (3): 2014, 2015, 2016
- EHF Challenge Cup:
  - Semifinalist: 2010

== European record ==
Season	Competition	Round	Club	1st leg	2nd leg	Aggregate
2016–17	EHF Cup	R1	(Hungary) Alba Fehérvár KC	17–28	17–27	34–55
