= Brest Arena =

Multi-purpose arena in Brest, France

Coordinates: 48.38°N 4.52°W

- Interactive map of Brest Arena
- Location: Brest, France
- Owner: Brest Métropole
- Operator: Brest'aim
- Capacity: 4,077 (handball); 5,006 (basketball); 6,000 (concerts)
- Field size: 110 x 70 m

Construction
- Opened: 2014
- Cost: €42 million
- Architect: Hérault Arnod Architectes

Tenant
- Brest Bretagne Handball

Brest Arena is a multi-purpose arena in Brest, France. Its tenant is Brest Bretagne Handball. Inaugurated on September 13, 2014, it is designed to host major sporting competitions, team training sessions and large-scale concerts. It was designed by Hérault Arnod Architectures.

== Events ==
- 2017 World Men's Handball Championship
- 2018 European Women's Handball Championship

== See also ==
- List of indoor arenas in France
