= Palais des Sports Jean Weille =

Indoor arena in Nancy, France

Coordinates: 48°41′57″N 6°8′22″E

- Gentilly
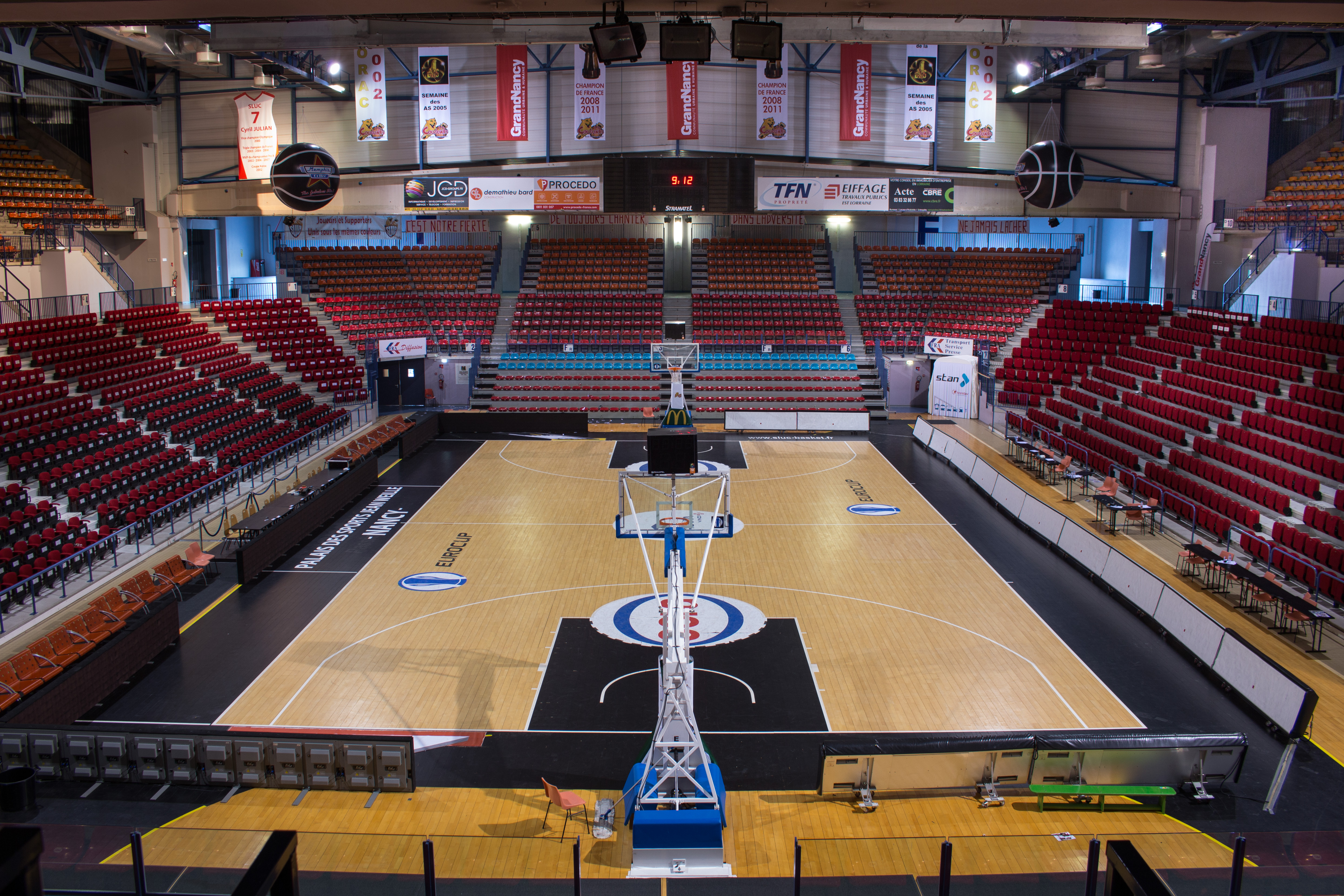
- Interactive map of Palais des Sports Jean Weille
- Location: Nancy, France
- Capacity: 6,027 (Basketball)

Construction
- Renovated: 1999

Tenant
- SLUC Nancy Basket (LNB Pro A)

Palais de Sports Jean Weille is an indoor sporting arena located in Nancy, France. The seating capacity of the arena is 6,027 people. It is currently home to the SLUC Nancy professional basketball team.
