= Florina-Cristina Burcea-Zamfir =

Romanian handball player (born 1989)

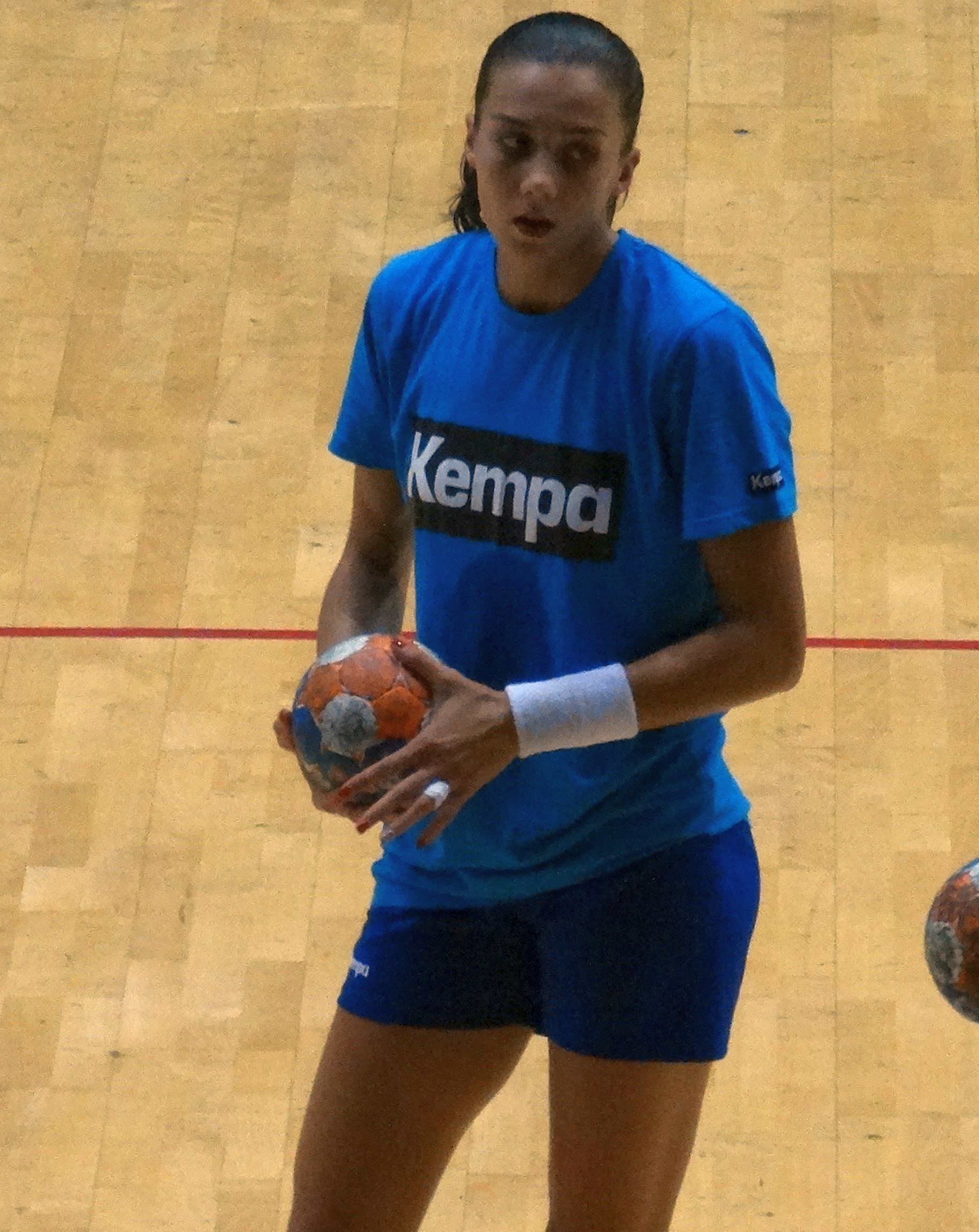

Personal information
- Nationality: Romanian
- Born: 29 September 1989 (age 37) Slatina, Romania
- Height: 1.84 m (6 ft 0 in)

Sport
- Sport: Handball
- Position: Left back
- Current club: SCM Craiova
- Number: 89

Senior clubs
- Years: Team
- –2009: KZN Slatina
- 2009–2011: CS Tomis Constanţa
- 2011–2016: Corona Brașov
- 2016–: SCM Craiova
National team
| Years | Team | Apps | (Gls) |
| 2010– | Romania | 19 | (29) |
Medal record
European Junior Championship
| Bronze medal – third place | 2007 Turkey |

Florina-Cristina Burcea-Zamfir (née Zamfir; formerly Florianu; born 29 September 1989) is a Romanian handballer who plays for SCM Craiova.

She was given the award of Cetățean de onoare ("Honorary Citizen") of the city of Craiova in 2018.

== International honours ==
- EHF Cup:
  - Winner: 2018

== Individual awards ==
- Top Scorer of the EHF Cup: 2016
- Top Scorer of the Bucharest Trophy: 2015
- Top Scorer of the Romanian National League: 2017
- Prosport All-Star Left Back of the Romanian National League: 2017

== Personal life ==
On 31 May 2019, she married her club coach Bogdan Burcea.
