= 2021 European Women's U-19 Handball Championship =

Tournament details
- Host country: Slovenia
- Venues: 2 (in 1 host city)
- Dates: 8–18 July
- Teams: 15 (from 1 confederation)

Final positions
- Champions: Hungary (2nd title)
- Runners-up: Russia
- Third place: France
- Fourth place: Sweden

Tournament statistics
- Matches played: 49
- Goals scored: 2,619 (53.45 per match)
- Attendance: 4,656 (95 per match)
- Top scorers: (Austria) Katarina Pandza (68 goals)

Awards
- Best player: (Hungary) Blanka Kajdon

The 2021 European Women's U-19 Handball Championship was the 13th edition of the European Women's U-19 Handball Championship, and was held in Celje, Slovenia from 8 to 18 July 2021.

== Qualification ==
Competition	Dates	Host	Vacancies	Qualified
Women's 17 EHF EURO 2019	1–11 August 2019	Slovenia	14	Hungary; Sweden; France; Denmark; Russia; Norway; Germany; Austria; Montenegro; Slovenia; Romania; Slovakia; Portugal; Croatia
Women's 17 EHF Championship 2019	3–11 August 2019	(Italy) Lignano Sabbiadoro	1	Czech Republic
Women's 17 EHF Championship 2019	3–11 August 2019	(Georgia (country)) Tbilisi	1	Switzerland

== Draw ==
The draw was held on 10 February 2021 in Vienna.

Pot 1	Pot 2	Pot 3	Pot 4
Denmark; France; Hungary; Sweden	Austria; Germany; Norway; Russia	Montenegro; Romania; Slovakia; Slovenia	Croatia; Czech Republic; Portugal; Switzerland

== Preliminary round ==
All times are local (UTC+2).

=== Group A ===
Pos	Team	Pld	W	D	L	GF	GA	GD	Pts	Qualification
1	Germany	3	2	0	1	80	73	+7	4 (Note: Germany 2 Pts, +2 GD, 51 GS; Denmark 2 Pts, +2 GD, 49 GS; Switzerland 2 Pts, –4 GD.)	Main round
2	Denmark	3	2	0	1	80	64	+16	4	Main round
3	Switzerland	3	2	0	1	85	75	+10	4	Intermediate round
4	Slovenia (H)	3	0	0	3	63	96	−33	0	Intermediate round

Rules for classification: 1) points; 2) head-to-head points; 3) head-to-head goal difference; 4) head-to-head number of goals scored; 5) Goal difference.
(H) Hosts
Notes:

8 July 2021; 17:00	Germany	30–23	Switzerland	Golovec Hall, Celje; Attendance: 50; Referees: Kull, Tint (EST)
8 July 2021; 17:00	Hampel 9	(12–10)	M. Emmenegger 8	Golovec Hall, Celje; Attendance: 50; Referees: Kull, Tint (EST)
8 July 2021; 17:00	1× (yellow card) 9× (suspension)	Report	4× (suspension)	Golovec Hall, Celje; Attendance: 50; Referees: Kull, Tint (EST)

8 July 2021; 19:30	Denmark	31–17	Slovenia	Golovec Hall, Celje; Attendance: 100; Referees: Carmaux, Mursch (FRA)
8 July 2021; 19:30	Andersen 6	(12–10)	Novak 5	Golovec Hall, Celje; Attendance: 100; Referees: Carmaux, Mursch (FRA)
8 July 2021; 19:30	5× (suspension)	Report	3× (suspension) 1× (red card)	Golovec Hall, Celje; Attendance: 100; Referees: Carmaux, Mursch (FRA)

9 July 2021; 17:00	Switzerland	26–23	Denmark	Golovec Hall, Celje; Attendance: 300; Referees: Barysas, Petrušis (LTU)
9 July 2021; 17:00	Heinzer 8	(11–11)	Rasmussen 6	Golovec Hall, Celje; Attendance: 300; Referees: Barysas, Petrušis (LTU)
9 July 2021; 17:00	2× (suspension)	Report	1× (suspension)	Golovec Hall, Celje; Attendance: 300; Referees: Barysas, Petrušis (LTU)

9 July 2021; 19:00	Slovenia	24–29	Germany	Golovec Hall, Celje; Attendance: 66; Referees: Vitaku, Vitaku (KOS)
9 July 2021; 19:00	Kralj 5	(14–16)	Conze 9	Golovec Hall, Celje; Attendance: 66; Referees: Vitaku, Vitaku (KOS)
9 July 2021; 19:00	2× (yellow card) 1× (suspension)	Report	1× (yellow card) 2× (suspension)	Golovec Hall, Celje; Attendance: 66; Referees: Vitaku, Vitaku (KOS)

11 July 2021; 17:00	Denmark	26–21	Germany	Golovec Hall, Celje; Attendance: 70; Referees: Lidacka, Lesiak (POL)
11 July 2021; 17:00	Rasmussen 5	(14–10)	Conze, Nielsen 5	Golovec Hall, Celje; Attendance: 70; Referees: Lidacka, Lesiak (POL)
11 July 2021; 17:00	1× (yellow card) 1× (suspension)	Report	3× (suspension)	Golovec Hall, Celje; Attendance: 70; Referees: Lidacka, Lesiak (POL)

11 July 2021; 19:00	Slovenia	22–36	Switzerland	Golovec Hall, Celje; Attendance: 200; Referees: Christidi, Papamattheou (GRE)
11 July 2021; 19:00	Kralj 9	(11–18)	Heinzer 12	Golovec Hall, Celje; Attendance: 200; Referees: Christidi, Papamattheou (GRE)
11 July 2021; 19:00	1× (yellow card) 2× (suspension)	Report	4× (suspension)	Golovec Hall, Celje; Attendance: 200; Referees: Christidi, Papamattheou (GRE)

=== Group B ===
Pos	Team	Pld	W	D	L	GF	GA	GD	Pts	Qualification
1	Sweden	3	3	0	0	77	57	+20	6	Main round
2	Russia	3	2	0	1	73	57	+16	4	Main round
3	Slovakia	3	1	0	2	66	72	−6	2	Intermediate round
4	Portugal (Note: Portugal had to withdraw from the tournament due to positive COVID-19 cases within the team)	3	0	0	3	0	30	−30	0	Withdrawn

Rules for classification: 1) points; 2) head-to-head points; 3) head-to-head goal difference; 4) head-to-head number of goals scored; 5) Goal difference.
Notes:

8 July 2021; 15:00	Sweden	37–29	Slovakia	Golovec Hall, Celje; Attendance: 200; Referees: Duplii, Pobedrina (UKR)
8 July 2021; 15:00	Axnér 6	(20–12)	Lancz 8	Golovec Hall, Celje; Attendance: 200; Referees: Duplii, Pobedrina (UKR)
8 July 2021; 15:00	1× (yellow card) 5× (suspension) 1× (red card)	Report	1× (yellow card) 4× (suspension)	Golovec Hall, Celje; Attendance: 200; Referees: Duplii, Pobedrina (UKR)

9 July 2021; 15:00	Slovakia	27–35	Russia	Golovec Hall, Celje; Attendance: 150; Referees: Bozhinovski, Nachevski (MKD)
9 July 2021; 15:00	Lancz 8	(9–18)	Alekseeva 6	Golovec Hall, Celje; Attendance: 150; Referees: Bozhinovski, Nachevski (MKD)
9 July 2021; 15:00	4× (suspension)	Report	2× (yellow card) 4× (suspension)	Golovec Hall, Celje; Attendance: 150; Referees: Bozhinovski, Nachevski (MKD)

11 July 2021; 15:00	Sweden	30–28	Russia	Golovec Hall, Celje; Attendance: 100; Referees: Carmaux, Mursch (FRA)
11 July 2021; 15:00	Axnér, Koppang 8	(10–14)	Zakordonskaia 8	Golovec Hall, Celje; Attendance: 100; Referees: Carmaux, Mursch (FRA)
11 July 2021; 15:00	1× (yellow card) 5× (suspension)	Report	1× (yellow card) 3× (suspension)	Golovec Hall, Celje; Attendance: 100; Referees: Carmaux, Mursch (FRA)

=== Group C ===
Pos	Team	Pld	W	D	L	GF	GA	GD	Pts	Qualification
1	France	3	3	0	0	81	59	+22	6	Main round
2	Croatia	3	2	0	1	60	66	−6	4	Main round
3	Montenegro	3	1	0	2	76	72	+4	2	Intermediate round
4	Austria	3	0	0	3	66	86	−20	0	Intermediate round

Rules for classification: 1) points; 2) head-to-head points; 3) head-to-head goal difference; 4) head-to-head number of goals scored; 5) Goal difference.

8 July 2021; 13:00	France	29–20	Montenegro	Zlatorog Arena, Celje; Attendance: 20; Referees: Lidacka, Lesiak (POL)
8 July 2021; 13:00	Grandveau 10	(14–11)	Džaferović 7	Zlatorog Arena, Celje; Attendance: 20; Referees: Lidacka, Lesiak (POL)
8 July 2021; 13:00	1× (yellow card) 2× (suspension)	Report	4× (suspension)	Zlatorog Arena, Celje; Attendance: 20; Referees: Lidacka, Lesiak (POL)

9 July 2021; 13:00	Croatia	14–24	France	Zlatorog Arena, Celje; Attendance: 50; Referees: Kull, Tint (EST)
9 July 2021; 13:00	three players 3	(6–13)	three players 4	Zlatorog Arena, Celje; Attendance: 50; Referees: Kull, Tint (EST)
9 July 2021; 13:00	1× (yellow card) 7× (suspension)	Report	1× (yellow card) 3× (suspension)	Zlatorog Arena, Celje; Attendance: 50; Referees: Kull, Tint (EST)

9 July 2021; 15:00	Montenegro	35–20	Austria	Zlatorog Arena, Celje; Attendance: 39; Referees: Jović, Arnautović (BIH)
9 July 2021; 15:00	Džaferović 7	(18–7)	K. Pandza 5	Zlatorog Arena, Celje; Attendance: 39; Referees: Jović, Arnautović (BIH)
9 July 2021; 15:00	6× (suspension) 1× (red card)	Report	3× (suspension)	Zlatorog Arena, Celje; Attendance: 39; Referees: Jović, Arnautović (BIH)

10 July 2021^{[N 1]}	Austria	21–23	Croatia	Zlatorog Arena, Celje; Attendance: 55; Referees: Vitaku, Vitaku (KOS)
10 July 2021^{[N 1]}	Dramac 9	(12–13)	Zrnić 11	Zlatorog Arena, Celje; Attendance: 55; Referees: Vitaku, Vitaku (KOS)
10 July 2021^{[N 1]}	1× (yellow card) 5× (suspension)	Report	1× (yellow card) 10× (suspension) 1× (red card)	Zlatorog Arena, Celje; Attendance: 55; Referees: Vitaku, Vitaku (KOS)

11 July 2021; 13:00	France	28–25	Austria	Zlatorog Arena, Celje; Attendance: 50; Referees: Backović, Palačković (SLO)
11 July 2021; 13:00	Grandveau 8	(14–14)	K. Pandza 6	Zlatorog Arena, Celje; Attendance: 50; Referees: Backović, Palačković (SLO)
11 July 2021; 13:00	1× (yellow card) 3× (suspension)	Report	1× (yellow card) 4× (suspension)	Zlatorog Arena, Celje; Attendance: 50; Referees: Backović, Palačković (SLO)

11 July 2021; 15:00	Montenegro	21–23	Croatia	Zlatorog Arena, Celje; Attendance: 41; Referees: Bozhinovski, Nachevski (MKD)
11 July 2021; 15:00	Džaferović 7	(14–9)	Zrnić 6	Zlatorog Arena, Celje; Attendance: 41; Referees: Bozhinovski, Nachevski (MKD)
11 July 2021; 15:00	1× (yellow card) 4× (suspension)	Report	2× (yellow card)	Zlatorog Arena, Celje; Attendance: 41; Referees: Bozhinovski, Nachevski (MKD)

The game was originally supposed to be played on 8 July 2021.

=== Group D ===
Pos	Team	Pld	W	D	L	GF	GA	GD	Pts	Qualification
1	Hungary	3	3	0	0	96	65	+31	6	Main round
2	Romania	3	2	0	1	82	74	+8	4	Main round
3	Czech Republic	3	1	0	2	73	85	−12	2	Intermediate round
4	Norway	3	0	0	3	73	100	−27	0	Intermediate round

Rules for classification: 1) points; 2) head-to-head points; 3) head-to-head goal difference; 4) head-to-head number of goals scored; 5) Goal difference.

8 July 2021; 17:00	Hungary	27–19	Romania	Zlatorog Arena, Celje; Attendance: 43; Referees: Jović, Arnautović (BIH)
8 July 2021; 17:00	Kajdon 8	(12–11)	Borș 5	Zlatorog Arena, Celje; Attendance: 43; Referees: Jović, Arnautović (BIH)
8 July 2021; 17:00	3× (yellow card) 5× (suspension)	Report	2× (yellow card) 5× (suspension)	Zlatorog Arena, Celje; Attendance: 43; Referees: Jović, Arnautović (BIH)

8 July 2021; 19:00	Norway	25–28	Czech Republic	Zlatorog Arena, Celje; Attendance: 60; Referees: Backović, Palačković (SLO)
8 July 2021; 19:00	M. Andersen 6	(10–12)	Königová 8	Zlatorog Arena, Celje; Attendance: 60; Referees: Backović, Palačković (SLO)
8 July 2021; 19:00	2× (yellow card) 5× (suspension)	Report	1× (yellow card) 2× (suspension)	Zlatorog Arena, Celje; Attendance: 60; Referees: Backović, Palačković (SLO)

9 July 2021; 17:00	Czech Republic	20–33	Hungary	Zlatorog Arena, Celje; Attendance: 100; Referees: Duplii, Pobedrina (UKR)
9 July 2021; 17:00	three players 3	(8–15)	Koronczai 8	Zlatorog Arena, Celje; Attendance: 100; Referees: Duplii, Pobedrina (UKR)
9 July 2021; 17:00	2× (suspension)	Report	1× (yellow card) 3× (suspension)	Zlatorog Arena, Celje; Attendance: 100; Referees: Duplii, Pobedrina (UKR)

9 July 2021; 19:00	Romania	36–22	Norway	Zlatorog Arena, Celje; Attendance: 59; Referees: Christidi, Papamattheou (GRE)
9 July 2021; 19:00	Gogîrlă 8	(20–6)	Nypan 4	Zlatorog Arena, Celje; Attendance: 59; Referees: Christidi, Papamattheou (GRE)
9 July 2021; 19:00	1× (yellow card) 7× (suspension)	Report	1× (yellow card) 4× (suspension)	Zlatorog Arena, Celje; Attendance: 59; Referees: Christidi, Papamattheou (GRE)

11 July 2021; 17:00	Hungary	36–26	Norway	Zlatorog Arena, Celje; Attendance: 71; Referees: Vitaku, Vitaku (KOS)
11 July 2021; 17:00	Kajdon 5	(21–15)	Nypan 6	Zlatorog Arena, Celje; Attendance: 71; Referees: Vitaku, Vitaku (KOS)
11 July 2021; 17:00	1× (yellow card) 5× (suspension)	Report	1× (yellow card) 2× (suspension)	Zlatorog Arena, Celje; Attendance: 71; Referees: Vitaku, Vitaku (KOS)

11 July 2021; 19:00	Romania	27–25	Czech Republic	Zlatorog Arena, Celje; Attendance: 41; Referees: Barysas, Petrušis (LTU)
11 July 2021; 19:00	Gogîrlă 8	(14–10)	Cholevová 10	Zlatorog Arena, Celje; Attendance: 41; Referees: Barysas, Petrušis (LTU)
11 July 2021; 19:00	1× (yellow card) 7× (suspension)	Report	2× (yellow card) 5× (suspension) 1× (red card)	Zlatorog Arena, Celje; Attendance: 41; Referees: Barysas, Petrušis (LTU)

== Intermediate round ==
=== Group III ===
Pos	Team	Pld	W	D	L	GF	GA	GD	Pts	Qualification
1	Switzerland	2	2	0	0	65	49	+16	4	9–12th place semifinals
2	Slovakia	2	1	0	1	58	52	+6	2	9–12th place semifinals
3	Slovenia (H)	2	0	0	2	45	67	−22	0	13–15th place semifinal

Rules for classification: 1) points; 2) head-to-head points; 3) head-to-head goal difference; 4) head-to-head number of goals scored; 5) Goal difference.
(H) Hosts

13 July 2021; 15:00	Switzerland	29–27	Slovakia	Golovec Hall, Celje; Attendance: 70; Referees: Kull, Tint (EST)
13 July 2021; 15:00	Altherr 9	(15–13)	Lancz 8	Golovec Hall, Celje; Attendance: 70; Referees: Kull, Tint (EST)
13 July 2021; 15:00	7× (suspension)	Report	1× (yellow card) 5× (suspension)	Golovec Hall, Celje; Attendance: 70; Referees: Kull, Tint (EST)

14 July 2021; 15:00	Slovakia	31–23	Slovenia	Golovec Hall, Celje; Attendance: 200; Referees: Lidacka, Lesiak (POL)
14 July 2021; 15:00	Lancz 8	(17–15)	Novak 6	Golovec Hall, Celje; Attendance: 200; Referees: Lidacka, Lesiak (POL)
14 July 2021; 15:00	1× (yellow card) 7× (suspension)	Report	1× (yellow card) 6× (suspension)	Golovec Hall, Celje; Attendance: 200; Referees: Lidacka, Lesiak (POL)

=== Group IV ===
Pos	Team	Pld	W	D	L	GF	GA	GD	Pts	Qualification
1	Czech Republic	3	2	0	1	79	78	+1	4 (Note: Norway 25–28 Czech Republic)	9–12th place semifinals
2	Norway	3	2	0	1	102	78	+24	4	9–12th place semifinals
3	Montenegro	3	1	0	2	79	75	+4	2 (Note: Montenegro 35–20 Austria)	13th place game
4	Austria	3	1	0	2	79	108	−29	2	13–15th place semifinal

Rules for classification: 1) points; 2) head-to-head points; 3) head-to-head goal difference; 4) head-to-head number of goals scored; 5) Goal difference.
Notes:

13 July 2021; 17:00	Austria	27–46	Norway	Golovec Hall, Celje; Attendance: 30; Referees: Carmaux, Mursch (FRA)
13 July 2021; 17:00	K. Pandza 10	(14–21)	M. Andersen 8	Golovec Hall, Celje; Attendance: 30; Referees: Carmaux, Mursch (FRA)
13 July 2021; 17:00	1× (suspension)	Report	3× (suspension)	Golovec Hall, Celje; Attendance: 30; Referees: Carmaux, Mursch (FRA)

13 July 2021; 19:00	Montenegro	21–24	Czech Republic	Golovec Hall, Celje; Attendance: 30; Referees: Vitaku, Vitaku (KOS)
13 July 2021; 19:00	N. Kadović 5	(11–10)	Cholevová 8	Golovec Hall, Celje; Attendance: 30; Referees: Vitaku, Vitaku (KOS)
13 July 2021; 19:00	1× (yellow card) 4× (suspension)	Report	2× (yellow card) 3× (suspension)	Golovec Hall, Celje; Attendance: 30; Referees: Vitaku, Vitaku (KOS)

14 July 2021; 17:00	Norway	31–23	Montenegro	Golovec Hall, Celje; Attendance: 100; Referees: Backović, Palačković (SLO)
14 July 2021; 17:00	Nypan 10	(16–12)	Džaferović 6	Golovec Hall, Celje; Attendance: 100; Referees: Backović, Palačković (SLO)
14 July 2021; 17:00	1× (yellow card) 4× (suspension)	Report	3× (suspension)	Golovec Hall, Celje; Attendance: 100; Referees: Backović, Palačković (SLO)

14 July 2021; 19:00	Czech Republic	27–32	Austria	Golovec Hall, Celje; Attendance: 50; Referees: Kull, Tint (EST)
14 July 2021; 19:00	Cholevová 10	(12–14)	Dramac 12	Golovec Hall, Celje; Attendance: 50; Referees: Kull, Tint (EST)
14 July 2021; 19:00	5× (suspension)	Report	5× (suspension)	Golovec Hall, Celje; Attendance: 50; Referees: Kull, Tint (EST)

== Main round ==
=== Group I ===
Pos	Team	Pld	W	D	L	GF	GA	GD	Pts	Qualification
1	Russia	3	2	0	1	83	79	+4	4 (Note: Russia 2 Pts, +1 GD, 55 GS; Sweden 2 Pts, +1 GD, 54 GS; Denmark 2 Pts, –2 GD.)	Semifinals
2	Sweden	3	2	0	1	84	78	+6	4	Semifinals
3	Denmark	3	2	0	1	75	72	+3	4	5–8th place semifinals
4	Germany	3	0	0	3	71	84	−13	0	5–8th place semifinals

Rules for classification: 1) points; 2) head-to-head points; 3) head-to-head goal difference; 4) head-to-head number of goals scored; 5) Goal difference.
Notes:

13 July 2021; 17:00	Denmark	24–27	Russia	Zlatorog Arena, Celje; Attendance: 91; Referees: Christidi, Papamattheou (GRE)
13 July 2021; 17:00	Skøtt 6	(12–14)	Statsenko 8	Zlatorog Arena, Celje; Attendance: 91; Referees: Christidi, Papamattheou (GRE)
13 July 2021; 17:00	5× (suspension)	Report	1× (suspension)	Zlatorog Arena, Celje; Attendance: 91; Referees: Christidi, Papamattheou (GRE)

13 July 2021; 19:00	Germany	25–30	Sweden	Zlatorog Arena, Celje; Attendance: 100; Referees: Backović, Palačković (SLO)
13 July 2021; 19:00	Engel 9	(14–15)	Axnér 9	Zlatorog Arena, Celje; Attendance: 100; Referees: Backović, Palačković (SLO)
13 July 2021; 19:00	4× (suspension)	Report	1× (yellow card) 2× (suspension)	Zlatorog Arena, Celje; Attendance: 100; Referees: Backović, Palačković (SLO)

14 July 2021; 17:00	Russia	28–25	Germany	Zlatorog Arena, Celje; Attendance: 67; Referees: Jović, Arnautović (BIH)
14 July 2021; 17:00	Baeva 6	(15–10)	Nielsen 7	Zlatorog Arena, Celje; Attendance: 67; Referees: Jović, Arnautović (BIH)
14 July 2021; 17:00	2× (suspension)	Report	4× (suspension)	Zlatorog Arena, Celje; Attendance: 67; Referees: Jović, Arnautović (BIH)

14 July 2021; 19:00	Sweden	24–25	Denmark	Zlatorog Arena, Celje; Attendance: 82; Referees: Carmaux, Mursch (FRA)
14 July 2021; 19:00	Axnér, Koppang 6	(12–15)	Berger Wierzba 6	Zlatorog Arena, Celje; Attendance: 82; Referees: Carmaux, Mursch (FRA)
14 July 2021; 19:00	6× (suspension)	Report	1× (yellow card) 4× (suspension) 1× (red card)	Zlatorog Arena, Celje; Attendance: 82; Referees: Carmaux, Mursch (FRA)

=== Group II ===
Pos	Team	Pld	W	D	L	GF	GA	GD	Pts	Qualification
1	Hungary	3	3	0	0	82	59	+23	6	Semifinals
2	France	3	2	0	1	71	61	+10	4	Semifinals
3	Romania	3	1	0	2	75	78	−3	2	5–8th place semifinals
4	Croatia	3	0	0	3	58	88	−30	0	5–8th place semifinals

Rules for classification: 1) points; 2) head-to-head points; 3) head-to-head goal difference; 4) head-to-head number of goals scored; 5) Goal difference.

13 July 2021; 13:00	Croatia	20–29	Romania	Zlatorog Arena, Celje; Attendance: 64; Referees: Lidacka, Lesiak (POL)
13 July 2021; 13:00	Zrnić 7	(10–13)	Ion 7	Zlatorog Arena, Celje; Attendance: 64; Referees: Lidacka, Lesiak (POL)
13 July 2021; 13:00	1× (yellow card) 3× (suspension)	Report	1× (suspension)	Zlatorog Arena, Celje; Attendance: 64; Referees: Lidacka, Lesiak (POL)

13 July 2021; 15:00	France	16–20	Hungary	Zlatorog Arena, Celje; Attendance: 100; Referees: Bozhinovski, Nachevski (MKD)
13 July 2021; 15:00	Chambonnier 7	(8–11)	Kukely 4	Zlatorog Arena, Celje; Attendance: 100; Referees: Bozhinovski, Nachevski (MKD)
13 July 2021; 15:00	1× (yellow card) 3× (suspension)	Report	2× (yellow card) 1× (suspension)	Zlatorog Arena, Celje; Attendance: 100; Referees: Bozhinovski, Nachevski (MKD)

14 July 2021; 13:00	Romania	27–31	France	Zlatorog Arena, Celje; Attendance: 50; Referees: Barysas, Petrušis (LTU)
14 July 2021; 13:00	Gogîrlă 13	(14–12)	Kanoute 7	Zlatorog Arena, Celje; Attendance: 50; Referees: Barysas, Petrušis (LTU)
14 July 2021; 13:00	1× (yellow card) 3× (suspension)	Report	1× (suspension)	Zlatorog Arena, Celje; Attendance: 50; Referees: Barysas, Petrušis (LTU)

14 July 2021; 15:00	Hungary	35–24	Croatia	Zlatorog Arena, Celje; Attendance: 50; Referees: Duplii, Pobedrina (UKR)
14 July 2021; 15:00	Juhász 6	(16–9)	Birtić, Zrnić 4	Zlatorog Arena, Celje; Attendance: 50; Referees: Duplii, Pobedrina (UKR)
14 July 2021; 15:00	4× (suspension)	Report	5× (suspension)	Zlatorog Arena, Celje; Attendance: 50; Referees: Duplii, Pobedrina (UKR)

== Final round ==
=== Bracket ===
Championship bracket

Semifinals
16 July
Russia	25
France	24
16 July
Hungary	33
Sweden	26

Final
18 July
Russia	22
Hungary	31
Third place
18 July
France	30
Sweden	29

Ninth place bracket

9–12th place semifinals
16 July
Switzerland	32
Norway	33
16 July
Czech Republic	29
Slovakia	25

Ninth place
17 July
Norway	33
Czech Republic	27
Eleventh place
17 July
Switzerland	33
Slovakia	28

Fifth place bracket

5–8th place semifinals
16 July
Denmark	24
Croatia	22
16 July
Romania	28
Germany	24

Fifth place
17 July
Denmark	21
Romania	28
Seventh place
17 July
Croatia	24
Germany	20

13th place bracket

13–15th place semifinal
16 July
Slovenia	25
Austria	27

13th place
17 July
Austria	31
Montenegro	33

=== 13–15th place semifinal ===
16 July 2021; 14:45	Slovenia	25–27	Austria	Golovec Hall, Celje; Attendance: 100; Referees: Barysas, Petrušis (LTU)
16 July 2021; 14:45	Novak 10	(15–12)	K. Pandza 13	Golovec Hall, Celje; Attendance: 100; Referees: Barysas, Petrušis (LTU)
16 July 2021; 14:45	1× (yellow card) 3× (suspension)	Report	6× (suspension)	Golovec Hall, Celje; Attendance: 100; Referees: Barysas, Petrušis (LTU)

=== 9–12th place semifinals ===
16 July 2021; 17:00	Switzerland	32–33	Norway	Golovec Hall, Celje; Attendance: 30; Referees: Kull, Tint (EST)
16 July 2021; 17:00	Heinzer 10	(15–17)	Skindlo 6	Golovec Hall, Celje; Attendance: 30; Referees: Kull, Tint (EST)
16 July 2021; 17:00	2× (suspension)	Report	7× (suspension)	Golovec Hall, Celje; Attendance: 30; Referees: Kull, Tint (EST)

16 July 2021; 19:15	Czech Republic	29–25	Slovakia	Golovec Hall, Celje; Attendance: 50; Referees: Vitaku, Vitaku (KOS)
16 July 2021; 19:15	Cholevová 12	(10–11)	Lancz, Pálová 6	Golovec Hall, Celje; Attendance: 50; Referees: Vitaku, Vitaku (KOS)
16 July 2021; 19:15	1× (yellow card) 1× (suspension)	Report	1× (yellow card) 2× (suspension)	Golovec Hall, Celje; Attendance: 50; Referees: Vitaku, Vitaku (KOS)

=== 5–8th place semifinals ===
16 July 2021; 12:30	Denmark	24–22	Croatia	Zlatorog Arena, Celje; Attendance: 69; Referees: Lidacka, Lesiak (POL)
16 July 2021; 12:30	Johannsen 5	(12–12)	Zrnić 9	Zlatorog Arena, Celje; Attendance: 69; Referees: Lidacka, Lesiak (POL)
16 July 2021; 12:30	3× (suspension)	Report	4× (suspension)	Zlatorog Arena, Celje; Attendance: 69; Referees: Lidacka, Lesiak (POL)

16 July 2021; 14:45	Romania	28–24	Germany	Zlatorog Arena, Celje; Attendance: 50; Referees: Backović, Palačković (SLO)
16 July 2021; 14:45	Stoica 7	(13–11)	Nielsen 7	Zlatorog Arena, Celje; Attendance: 50; Referees: Backović, Palačković (SLO)
16 July 2021; 14:45	4× (suspension)	Report	7× (suspension)	Zlatorog Arena, Celje; Attendance: 50; Referees: Backović, Palačković (SLO)

=== Semifinals ===
16 July 2021; 17:00	Russia	25–24	France	Zlatorog Arena, Celje; Attendance: 150; Referees: Jović, Arnautović (BIH)
16 July 2021; 17:00	Baeva 5	(13–13)	Bouktit 6	Zlatorog Arena, Celje; Attendance: 150; Referees: Jović, Arnautović (BIH)
16 July 2021; 17:00		Report	1× (suspension)	Zlatorog Arena, Celje; Attendance: 150; Referees: Jović, Arnautović (BIH)

16 July 2021; 19:30	Hungary	33–26	Sweden	Zlatorog Arena, Celje; Attendance: 300; Referees: Carmaux, Mursch (FRA)
16 July 2021; 19:30	Faragó 9	(16–15)	Axnér 8	Zlatorog Arena, Celje; Attendance: 300; Referees: Carmaux, Mursch (FRA)
16 July 2021; 19:30	4× (suspension)	Report	4× (suspension)	Zlatorog Arena, Celje; Attendance: 300; Referees: Carmaux, Mursch (FRA)

=== 13th place game ===
17 July 2021; 14:45	Austria	31–33	Montenegro	Golovec Hall, Celje; Attendance: 50; Referees: Kull, Tint (EST)
17 July 2021; 14:45	K. Pandza 19	(15–15)	Džaferović 11	Golovec Hall, Celje; Attendance: 50; Referees: Kull, Tint (EST)
17 July 2021; 14:45	1× (yellow card) 5× (suspension)	Report	6× (suspension) 1× (red card)	Golovec Hall, Celje; Attendance: 50; Referees: Kull, Tint (EST)

=== Eleventh place game ===
17 July 2021; 17:00	Switzerland	33–28	Slovakia	Golovec Hall, Celje; Attendance: 30; Referees: Backović, Palačković (SLO)
17 July 2021; 17:00	Altherr 9	(15–11)	Lancz 8	Golovec Hall, Celje; Attendance: 30; Referees: Backović, Palačković (SLO)
17 July 2021; 17:00	4× (suspension)	Report	2× (suspension)	Golovec Hall, Celje; Attendance: 30; Referees: Backović, Palačković (SLO)

=== Ninth place game ===
17 July 2021; 19:15	Norway	33–27	Czech Republic	Golovec Hall, Celje; Attendance: 50; Referees: Vitaku, Vitaku (KOS)
17 July 2021; 19:15	M. Andersen 7	(15–8)	Cholevová 8	Golovec Hall, Celje; Attendance: 50; Referees: Vitaku, Vitaku (KOS)
17 July 2021; 19:15	1× (yellow card) 5× (suspension)	Report	1× (yellow card)	Golovec Hall, Celje; Attendance: 50; Referees: Vitaku, Vitaku (KOS)

=== Seventh place game ===
17 July 2021; 14:30	Croatia	24–20	Germany	Zlatorog Arena, Celje; Attendance: 50; Referees: Lidacka, Lesiak (POL)
17 July 2021; 14:30	Brkić 7	(12–12)	Hertha 5	Zlatorog Arena, Celje; Attendance: 50; Referees: Lidacka, Lesiak (POL)
17 July 2021; 14:30	3× (suspension)	Report	5× (suspension)	Zlatorog Arena, Celje; Attendance: 50; Referees: Lidacka, Lesiak (POL)

=== Fifth place game ===
17 July 2021; 16:45	Denmark	21–28	Romania	Zlatorog Arena, Celje; Attendance: 50; Referees: Barysas, Petrušis (LTU)
17 July 2021; 16:45	Frandsen 7	(10–15)	Gogîrlă 10	Zlatorog Arena, Celje; Attendance: 50; Referees: Barysas, Petrušis (LTU)
17 July 2021; 16:45		Report	2× (suspension)	Zlatorog Arena, Celje; Attendance: 50; Referees: Barysas, Petrušis (LTU)

=== Third place game ===
18 July 2021; 12:00	France	30–29	Sweden	Zlatorog Arena, Celje; Attendance: 200; Referees: Duplii, Pobedrina (UKR)
18 July 2021; 12:00	Grandveau 11	(15–10)	Koppang 8	Zlatorog Arena, Celje; Attendance: 200; Referees: Duplii, Pobedrina (UKR)
18 July 2021; 12:00	1× (suspension)	Report	5× (suspension)	Zlatorog Arena, Celje; Attendance: 200; Referees: Duplii, Pobedrina (UKR)

=== Final ===
18 July 2021; 14:30	Russia	22–31	Hungary	Zlatorog Arena, Celje; Attendance: 528; Referees: Christidi, Papamattheou (GRE)
18 July 2021; 14:30	Zakordonskaia 6	(11–17)	Farkas 7	Zlatorog Arena, Celje; Attendance: 528; Referees: Christidi, Papamattheou (GRE)
18 July 2021; 14:30	2× (suspension)	Report	1× (yellow card) 1× (suspension)	Zlatorog Arena, Celje; Attendance: 528; Referees: Christidi, Papamattheou (GRE)

== Final ranking and awards ==
=== Final ranking ===
Rank	Team
1st place, gold medalist(s)	Hungary
2nd place, silver medalist(s)	Russia
3rd place, bronze medalist(s)	France
4	Sweden
5	Romania
6	Denmark
7	Croatia
8	Germany
9	Norway
10	Czech Republic
11	Switzerland
12	Slovakia
13	Montenegro
14	Austria
15	Slovenia
–	Portugal

Qualified for the 2022 Junior World Championship

=== All Star Team ===
The All Star Team and awards were announced on 18 July 2021.

Position	Player
Goalkeeper	(Russia) Veronica Chipula
Left wing	(Hungary) Maja Mérai
Left back	(Russia) Daria Statsenko
Centre back	(France) Léna Grandveau
Right back	(Sweden) Nina Koppang
Right wing	(Croatia) Bruna Zrnić
Pivot	(France) Sarah Bouktit
Best defense player	(Sweden) Charité Mumbongo
Most valuable player	(Hungary) Blanka Kajdon

== Statistics ==
=== Top goalscorers ===
Rank	Name	Goals
1	(Austria) Katarina Pandza	68
2	(Czech Republic) Charlotte Cholevová	55
3	(Romania) Alicia Gogîrlă	53
4	(Slovakia) Barbora Lancz	46
5	(Croatia) Bruna Zrnić	45
6	(Sweden) Tyra Axnér	43
7	(Austria) Kristina Dramac	42
7	(Montenegro) Katarina Džaferović	42
9	(France) Léna Grandveau	39
9	(Switzerland) Celia Heinzer	39
