= Anna Bukovszky =

Hungarian handball player (born 2002)

Personal information
- Nationality: Hungarian
- Born: 30 June 2002 (age 24) Balassagyarmat, Hungary
- Height: 1.75 m (5 ft 9 in)

Sport
- Sport: Handball
- Position: Goalkeeper
- Current club: Esztergomi KC

Youth career
- Years: Team
- 2012–2013: Lóci DSE
- 2013–2018: Váci NKSE

Senior clubs
- Years: Team
- 2018–2025: Váci NKSE
- 2018–2020: → Gödi SE (loan)
- 2025–: Esztergomi KC
National team
Years	Team	Apps	(Gls)
2023–	Hungary	15	(0)
Medal record
Junior European Championship
Gold medal – first place	2021 Slovenia
Youth European Championship
Gold medal – first place	2019 Slovenia
European Women's U-16 Handball Championship
Gold medal – first place	2018 Sweden
Junior World Championship
Silver medal – second place	2022 Slovenia
- Updated on 10 December 2025

Anna Bukovszky (born 30 June 2002) is a Hungarian handballer for Esztergomi KC and the Hungarian national team.

== Career ==
=== Club ===
Gréta started her career at Lóci DSE. In 2013, it was transferred to Váci NKSE. She first appeared in the youth teams of Váci NKSE. From 2018 to 2020, she was also protected in the Nemzeti Bajnokság I/B team of Gödi SE with a double playing permit. She made her debut in the Váci NKSE team in September 2018 in the international cup series against the Israeli Maccabi Arazim Ramat Gan in the EHF Cup. In March 2019, she made her debut in Békéscsaba in the first team of Váci NKSE in Nemzeti Bajnokság I. She played in the EHF Cup twice and the EHF European League five times with Váci NKSE. In the summer of 2025, she transferred to Esztergomi KC, which finished third in the previous championship and therefore competed in the EHF European League.

=== National team ===
In June 2018, she won a gold medal with the Hungarian women's youth handball team at the Open U16 European Championship in Sweden. In the final, the Hungarian team won overtime against the French 31–30. In August 2019, she became Youth European Championship with the women's youth handball team after the Hungary women's national youth handball team defeated the Sweden women's national youth handball team 28–24 in the final. In July 2021, he won a gold medal at the Junior European Championship held in Slovenia after the Hungary women's national junior handball team defeated the Russia women's national junior handball team 31–22 in the final. In July 2022, she won a silver medal with the national team at the Junior World Championship held in Slovenia, after the Hungary women's national junior handball team lost to the Norway women's national junior handball team 31–29 in the final. She was included in the large squad of the 2022 European Women's Handball Championship, but in the end he will not become a member of the narrow squad. In the fall of 2023, national team captain Vladimir Golovin called her to the adult national team preparing for the 2023 World Women's Handball Championship in December, after 2 experienced goalkeepers: Melinda Szikora and Kinga Janurik were injured. On December 2, 2023, Anna made her debut in the Hungarian women's adult national team in the second round of the 2023 World Women's Handball Championship against the Cameroon national team. At the 2023 World Women's Handball Championship, the Hungarian team finished in 10th place, Anna played in 3 match. She was included in the large squad of the 2024 European Women's Handball Championship, but in the end he will not become a member of the narrow squad.

== Honours ==
=== National team ===
- Junior European Championship:
  - Gold: 2021
- Youth European Championship:
  - Gold: 2019
- European Women's U-16 Handball Championship:
  - Gold: 2018
- Junior World Championship:
  - Silver: 2022
