= Charité Mumbongo =

Swedish handball player (born 2002)

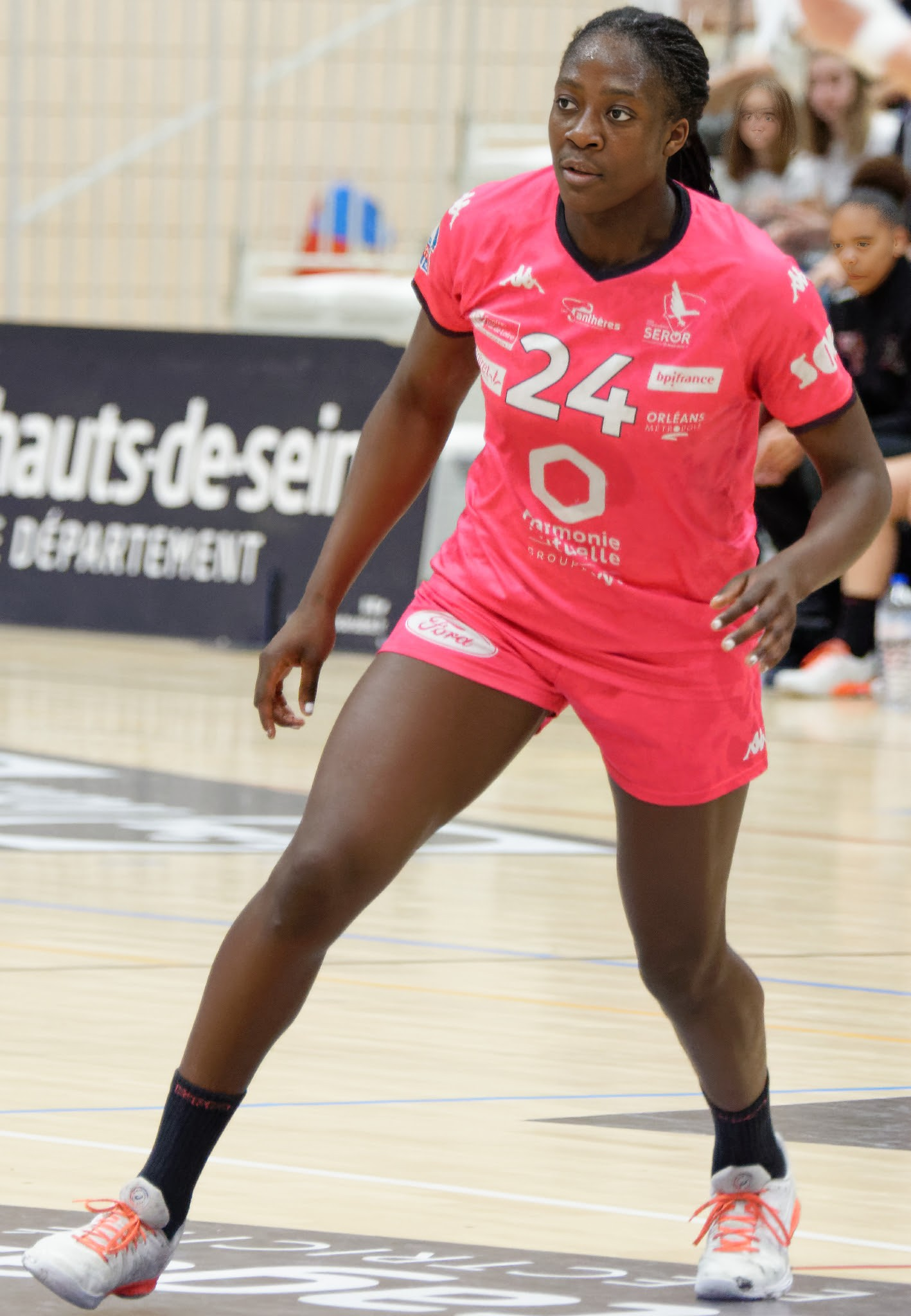

Personal information
- Full name: Charité Mumbongo
- Nationality: Swedish
- Born: 14 March 2002 (age 24) Bergsjön, Sweden
- Height: 1.79 m (5 ft 10 in)

Sport
- Sport: Handball
- Position: Left back
- Current club: ESBF Besançon
- Number: 24

Youth career
- Years: Team
- 2016-2019: Kärra HF

Senior clubs
- Years: Team
- 2019-2021: Kungälvs HK
- 2021-2022: Fleury Loiret HB
- 2022-2024: Viborg HK
- 2024-: ESBF Besançon
National team
| Years | Team | Apps | (Gls) |
| 2022- | Sweden | 8 | (4) |
Medal record
Youth European Championship
| Silver medal – second place | 2019 Slovenia |

Charité Mumbongo (born 14 March 2002) is a Swedish handballer for ESBF Besançon and the Swedish national team.

She made her debut on the Swedish national team on 24 April 2022, against Turkey.

On 27 April 2022, it was announced that Mumbongo had signed a 2-year contract with Viborg HK.

She represented Sweden at the 2019 European Women's U-17 Handball Championship in Slovenia, placing as runner-up. She also participated in the 2021 Women's U-19 European Handball Championship.

== Achievements ==
- Youth European Championship:
  - Silver Medalist: 2019
- Junior European Championship
  - Best defense player: 2021
