= Esztergomi KC =

Hungarian handball club

MOL Esztergomi KC
- Full name: MOL Esztergomi Kézilabda Club
- Short name: MOL Esztergom
- Founded: 2015; 11 years ago
- Arena: Suzuki Aréna, Esztergom
- Capacity: 1000
- Head coach: Gábor Elek
- League: Nemzeti Bajnokság I, 3rd
- Club colours
Home	Away

Esztergomi KC is a Hungarian professional women's handball club from Esztergom, that plays in the Nemzeti Bajnokság I.

The current name of the club is MOL Esztergomi KC due to sponsorship reasons.

Location of MOL Esztergom

== History ==
The Esztergomi Vitézek RAFC (fullname: Esztergomi Vitézek Rögbi, Atlétikai és Football Club) (English: Esztergomi Vitézek Rugby Athletic and Football Club ) is a Hungarian sports team founded in 1983. The women's handball division was established in 2015. The new team started as Esztergomi Vitézek RAFC in the county championship in the 2015/2016 season, in the Hungarian 4th division. In 2017, the team reached Nemzeti Bajnokság II, the Hungarian third division. At the end of the 2022/23 season, it was announced that coaching legend Gábor Elek, who is leaving Ferencvárosi TC after 15 years, will become the team's professional director and his wife, national team member Zita Szucsánszki, will join the team as a fitness coach and player. In February 2023, the team's new home, the Suzuki Aréna, was handed over. In the summer of 2023, it was announced that the Siófok KC team was excluded from Nemzeti Bajnokság I due to license problems and could only compete in Nemzeti Bajnokság II. Therefore, the Esztergom Vitézek, who finished second in the Nemzeti Bajnokság II Northern Group, can appear in the second division, the Nemzeti Bajnokság I/B, in the next season based on the decision of the Hungarian Handball Federation (MKSZ). At the end of the 2023/24 season, they finished in 2nd place behind the Szombathelyi KKA team in Nemzeti Bajnokság I/B and were promoted to the top division, Nemzeti Bajnokság I. In the top league, after the main sponsor, the team is already named MOL Esztergom. In the Nemzeti Bajnokság I, Gábor Elek already manages the team as head coach, which certified players such as former national team Anett Kisfaludy and Anett Kovács. In its first Nemzeti Bajnokság I season, the team surprisingly finished in 3rd place. The team can thus start in the 2025/26 EHF European League, which is why it has again signed several international players: Hungarian international Szandra Szöllősi-Zácsik, Apollónia Szmolek, Emília Varga, Anna Bukovszky and French international Emma Jacques.

== Crest, colours, supporters ==
=== Naming history ===
Name	Period
Esztergomi Vitézek RAFC	2015–2024
MOL Esztergomi KC	2024–present

=== Kit manufacturers ===
Period	Kit manufacturer
2024	(Germany) Jako
2024–present	(Germany) Puma

=== Kits ===
HOME

2023–24

AWAY

2023–24

THIRD

2023–24

== Sports Hall information ==
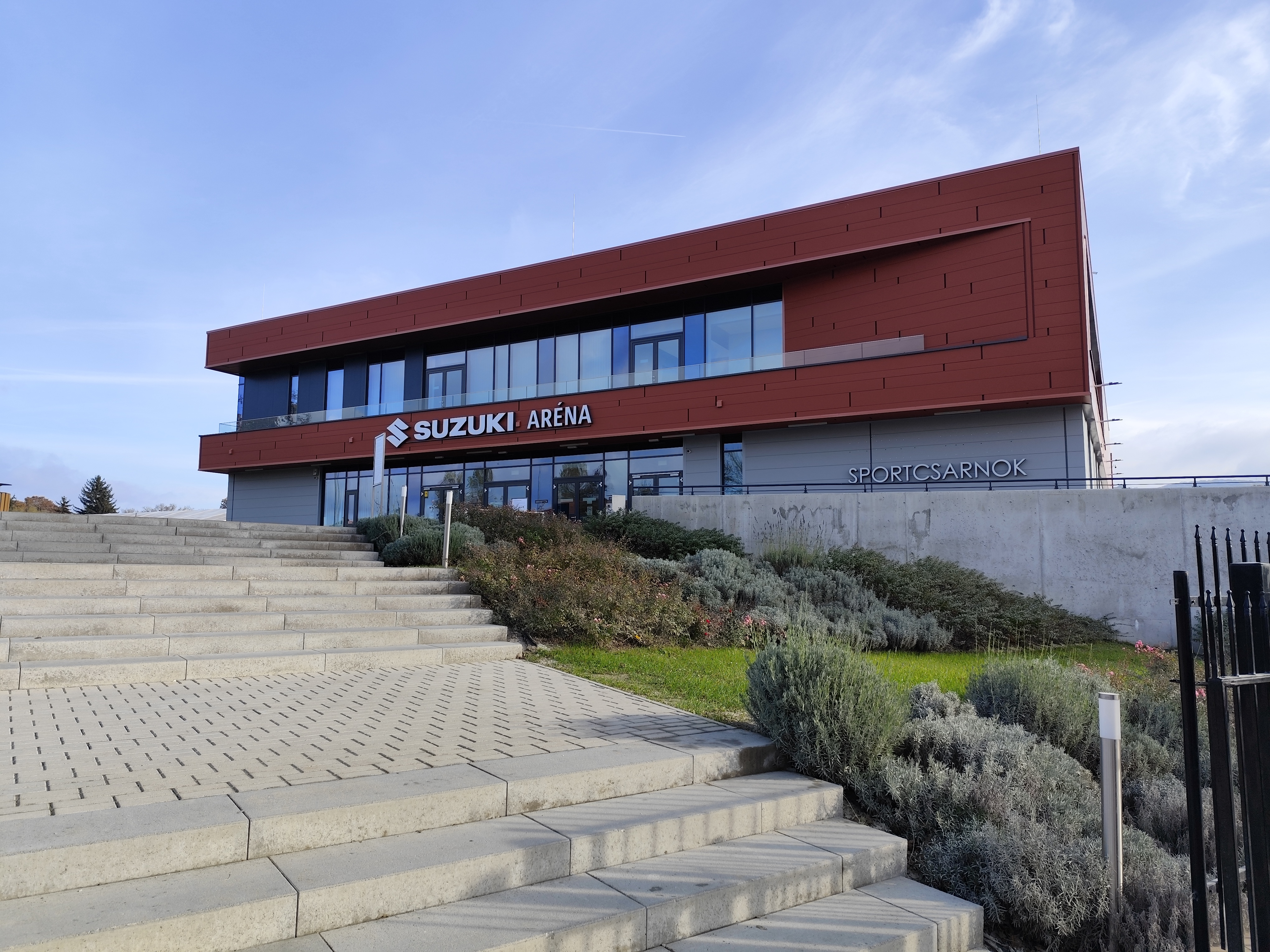
Home hall: Suzuki Aréna

- Name: – Suzuki Aréna
- City: – Esztergom
- Capacity: – 1000
- Address: – Helischer József út 5, Esztergom, Hungary.

== Management ==
Position	Name
Managing Director	(Hungary) András Ligeti
Sports Director	(Hungary) Nándor Bognár
Technical manager	(Hungary) Irén Mezőségi
Economic Manager	(Hungary) Zsombor Hábel
Media And Communications Manager	(Hungary) Gergely Lőrinczi

== Team ==
=== Current squad ===
Squad for the 2026–27 season

MOL Esztergom

Goalkeepers

- 12 (Hungary) Lili Herczeg
- 16 (Hungary) Anna Bukovszky
- 91 (Hungary) Ivett Parák

Left Wingers

- 4 (Hungary) Anna Ballai
- 53 (Hungary) Natalie Schatzl

Right Wingers

- 18 (Hungary) Anett Kovács
- 19 (Hungary) Ramóna Vártok

Line Players

- 14 (Hungary) Anett Kisfaludy
- 20 (Hungary) Apollónia Szmolek
- 26 (Hungary) Luca Faragó

Left Backs

- 30 (Hungary) Lea Faragó
- 3 (Hungary) Emília Varga
- 2 (Hungary) Szandra Szöllősi-Zácsik

Central Backs

- 8 (Hungary) Fanni Horváth
- 13 (Hungary) Borbála Ballai
- 7 (Hungary) Liza Kozma

Right Backs

- 24 (France) Emma Jacques
- 31 (Hungary) Zsanett Bohner
- (Hungary) Alexandra Agócs

=== Technical staff ===
- Head coach: (Hungary) Gábor Elek
- Assistant coach: (Hungary) Tamás Karvalics
- Goalkeeping coach: (Belarus) Elena Abramovich
- Fitness coach: (Hungary) László Sőlősi
- Fitness coach: (Hungary) Zita Szucsánszki
- Coach: (Hungary) Krisztián Erdős
- Head of Physiotherapy: (Hungary) Zoltán Heckel
- Physiotherapist: (Hungary) Anita Ollé-Csordás
- Masseur: (Hungary) Fruzsina Raj
- Club doctor: (Hungary) Dr. Márton Rátkai

=== Transfers ===
Transfers for the 2026–27 season

Joining

- (Hungary) Luca Faragó (LP) from (Germany) Thüringer HC
- (Hungary) Ramóna Vártok (RW) from (Hungary) Moyra-Budaörs Handball
- (Hungary) Zsanett Bohner (RB) from (Hungary) Kozármisleny SE

Leaving

- (Hungary) Zita Szucsánszki (retires)
- (Hungary) Vanessza Hajtai (LW)
- (Hungary) Klaudia Majoros (LP)
- (Hungary) Zsófia Mlinkó (CB)
- (Hungary) Korina Teplán (RW)

=== Transfer History ===
Transfers for the 2024–25 season

Joining

- (Hungary) Anett Kisfaludy (LP) from (Hungary) Ferencvárosi TC
- (Hungary) Anett Kovács (RW) from (Hungary) Ferencvárosi TC
- (Hungary) Lea Faragó (LB) from (Hungary) NEKA
- (Hungary) Viktória Nick (LP) from (Hungary) Dunaújvárosi Kohász KA
- (Hungary) Nikolett Tóth (GK) from (Hungary) Alba Fehérvár KC
- (Hungary) Anna Ballai (LW) from (Hungary) Váci NKSE
- (Hungary) Borbála Ballai (CB) from (Hungary) Váci NKSE
- (Hungary) Luca Kármán (LB) on loan from (Hungary) Ferencvárosi TC
- (Hungary) Fanni Horváth (CB) on loan from (Hungary) Ferencvárosi TC

Leaving

- (Hungary) Szilvia Ábrahám (LP) (retires)
- (Hungary) Nóra Valovics (CB) (retires)
- (Hungary) Helga Albert (RB) (retires)
- (Hungary) Dóra Berkesi (GK) (retires)
- (Hungary) Eszter Takács (LB) to (Hungary) Békéscsabai Előre NKSE
- (Hungary) Alexa Horváth (RW) to (Hungary) Szigetszentmiklós NKSE
- (Hungary) Karolina Pap (CB) to (Hungary) Szigetszentmiklós NKSE
- (Hungary) Anna Joó (LW) to (Hungary) Gödi SE
- (Hungary) Dóra Merő (GK) to (Hungary) Gyáli BKSE
- (Hungary) Noémi Százvai (LB) to (Hungary) Tatai AC
- (Hungary) Viktória Varga (RW) to (Hungary) ENUSE
- (Hungary) Kata Farkas (RB)
- (Hungary) Fanni Tomasek (LW)

Transfers for the 2023–24 season

Joining

- (Hungary) Zita Szucsánszki (CB) from (Hungary) Ferencvárosi TC
- (Hungary) Lili Herczeg (GK) from (Hungary) Siófok KC
- (Hungary) Vanessza Hajtai (LW) from (Hungary) Békéscsabai Előre NKSE
- (Hungary) Klaudia Majoros (LP) from (Hungary) Ferencvárosi TC U19
- (Hungary) Helga Albert (RB) from (Hungary) Kispest NKK
- (Hungary) Kata Farkas (RB) from (Hungary) Dunaújvárosi Kohász KA
- (Hungary) Viktória Varga (RW) from (Hungary) Dunaújvárosi Kohász KA U22
- (Hungary) Dóra Merő (GK) from (Hungary) Szigetszentmiklós NKSE
- (Hungary) Noémi Százvai (LB) from (Hungary) Tatai AC
- (Hungary) Alexa Horváth (RW) from (Hungary) Szent István SE
- (Hungary) Eszter Takács (LB) from (Hungary) Szent István SE
- (Hungary) Karolina Pap (CB) from (Hungary) Váci NKSE U19
- (Hungary) Zsófia Mlinkó (CB) from (Hungary) Moyra-Budaörs Handball

Leaving

- (Hungary) Zsuzsanna Doszpoth (GK) to (Hungary) Károli Gáspár RESC
- (Hungary) Katalin Tagscherer (RW) to (Hungary) Károli Gáspár RESC
- (Hungary) Nikolett Pomozi (RW) to (Hungary) Hatvani KSZSE
- (Hungary) Annamária Barczi (RB)
- (Hungary) Sára Sütő (RW) to (Hungary) Szentendrei NKE
- (Hungary) Patrícia Farkas-Vigh (LB) to (Hungary) Szentendrei NKE
- (Hungary) Renáta Csiki (CB) to (Hungary) Szigetszentmiklós NKSE
- (Hungary) Dorka Pálinkás (LB) to (Hungary) Eszterházy SC U21

== Honours ==
Honours		No.	Years
League
Nemzeti Bajnokság I/B	Runners-up	1	2023–24

== Former club members ==
=== Notable former players ===
The list includes players who have played at least once for their national team or spent at least 10 years with the team.

==== Goalkeepers ====
- (Hungary) Anna Bukovszky (2025–)

==== Right wingers ====
- (Hungary) Anett Kovács (2024–)

==== Line players ====
- (Hungary) Szilvia Ábrahám (2018–2024)
- (Hungary) Anett Kisfaludy (2024–)
- (Hungary) Apollónia Szmolek (2025–)

==== Left backs ====
- (Hungary) Lea Faragó (2024–)
- (Hungary) Szandra Szöllősi-Zácsik (2025–)
- (Hungary) Emília Varga (2025–)

==== Central backs ====
- (Hungary) Zita Szucsánszki (2023–)

==== Right backs ====
- (France) Emma Jacques (2025–)

=== Former coaches ===
Seasons	Coach	Country
2015–2023	Irén Mezőségi	(Hungary)
2023–2024	Tamás Karvalics	(Hungary)
2024–	Gábor Elek	(Hungary)
