= Nina Koppang =

Swedish handball player (born 2002)

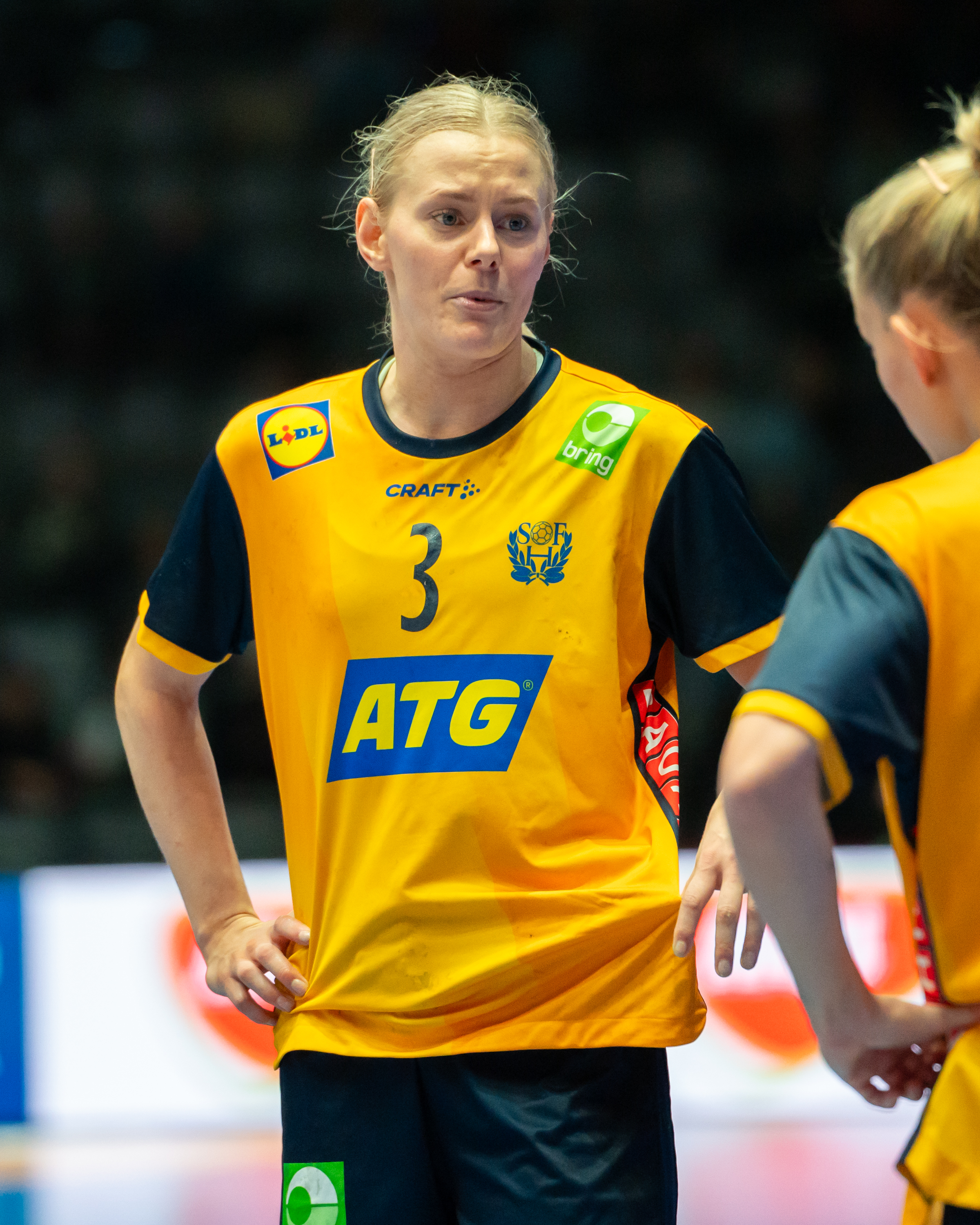

Personal information
- Full name: Nina Beate Koppang
- Nationality: Swedish; Norwegian
- Born: 31 May 2002 (age 24) Vadstena, Sweden
- Height: 1.77 m (5 ft 10 in)

Sport
- Sport: Handball
- Position: Right back
- Current club: IK Sävehof

Youth career
- Years: Team
- –2018: Vadstena HF
- 2018–2020: IK Sävehof

Senior clubs
- Years: Team
- 2020–2024: IK Sävehof
- 2024–01/2025: Vipers Kristiansand
- 01/2025–06/2026: Team Esbjerg
- 2026/2027–: IK Sävehof
National team
Years	Team	Apps	(Gls)
2021–	Sweden	50	(87)
- Updated on 27 July, 2026

Nina Koppang (born 31 May 2002) is a Swedish handball player who plays for IK Sävehof from 2026/2027 season and for the Sweden women's national handball team.

== Career ==
Koppang started playing handball in Vadstena HF. She also played football in Vadstena GIF. In 2018 she moved from Vadstena to attend a sports school, and with that she changed to IK Sävehof's youth team. She also continued playing football, now for Göteborg FC's youth team, however only for around 6 months until she decided to quit football and fully focus on handball. The season of 2020/21 was her first in IK Sävehof's senior team.

She signed for Norwegian club Vipers Kristiansand in 2024, only to leave less than a year later when the club went bankrupt.

When she was 16 she played for the Swedish U16 national team in football. In handball, she participated in the U17 European Championship 2019, where Sweden brought home a silver medal. She also participated in the U19 European Championship 2021, where Sweden ended up on the fourth place. There, she was chosen for the All-Star Team as best right back. She made a debut in the senior national team in April 2021 in a game against Hungary, when Sweden's original squad had a Coronavirus outbreak and had to be fully replaced.

== Achievements ==
- Swedish Championship:
  - Winner: 2022, 2023
- Swedish Cup:
  - Winner: 2023, 2024
- EHF Champions League
  - Bronze Medalist: 2024-25

== Personal life ==
She is the younger half-sister of the Swedish football player Stina Blackstenius, and daughter of Norwegian former fencer Nils Koppang.
