= Emma Jacques =

French handball player

Personal information
- Nationality: French
- Born: 29 November 2001 (age 24) Metz, France
- Height: 1.90 m (6 ft 3 in)

Sport
- Sport: Handball
- Position: Right back
- Current club: Esztergomi KC
- Number: 24

Youth career
- Years: Team
- –2016: La Tamponnaise
- 2016–2025: Metz Handball

Senior clubs
- Years: Team
- 2016–2025: Metz Handball
- 2025–: Esztergomi KC
National team
Years	Team	Apps	(Gls)
2021–	France	16	(11)
Medal record
World Championship
Bronze medal – third place	2025 Germany/Netherlands
- Updated on 17 December 2025

Emma Jacques (born 29 November 2001) is French handball player for the Hungarian club Esztergomi KC.

== Private ==
Her mother, Mélinda Jacques-Szabo, is a former handballer for both the Hungarian and French national team. They both play the same position, right back. Her father Pascal Jacques played for the French men's team.

== Career ==
Jacques started playing handball age 5 at the club La Tamponnaise.

From 2016 she played for the top league team Metz Handball, with whom she won the French U18 Championship. The following year she played for the second team, but in the 2016-17 season she made her debut for the first team in a match against Entente Sportive Bisontine Féminin.

With Metz Handball she won the Championship and Cup double 4 years in a row from 2022 to 2025.

For the 2025-26 season she joined the Hungarian team Esztergomi KC.

=== National team ===
Jacques made her debut for the French national team on 6 October 2021 against Czechia.

At the 2025 World Women's Handball Championship she won a bronze medal with the French team.
