= Anett Kovács =

Hungarian handball player (born 1994)

Personal information
- Nationality: Hungarian
- Born: 12 November 1994 (age 31) Mezőtúr, Hungary
- Height: 1.68 m (5 ft 6 in)

Sport
- Sport: Handball
- Position: Right wing
- Current club: Esztergomi KC
- Number: 18

Youth career
- Years: Team
- 2007–2012: Békéscsabai Előre NKSE

Senior clubs
- Years: Team
- 2012–2020: Békéscsabai Előre NKSE
- 2020–2024: Ferencvárosi TC
- 2024–: Esztergomi KC
National team
Years	Team	Apps	(Gls)
2021–	Hungary	25	(50)
- Updated on 10 December 2025

Anett Kovács (12 November 1994) is a Hungarian handballer for Esztergomi KC and the Hungarian national team.

== Career ==
=== Club ===
Kovacs started her career in 2007 in the Békéscsabai Előre NKSE team.

=== National team ===
She was included in the large squad of the 2019 World Women's Handball Championship, but did not become a member of the narrow squad. She was included in the large squad of the 2020 European Women's Handball Championship, but did not become a member of the narrow squad.

She made her debut for the Hungarian women's adult national team in March 2021 in Győr, in an Olympic qualifying match against Kazakhstan, where the Hungarian national team defeated the Kazakh national team 46–19. Kovacs scored 2 goals.

She participated in the 2021 World Women's Handball Championship, where the Hungarian team finished 10th (6 matches / 6 goals). She was included in the large squad of the 2022 European Women's Handball Championship, but did not become a member of the narrow squad. She was included in the large squad of the 2023 World Women's Handball Championship, but did not become a member of the narrow squad. She was included in the large squad of the 2024 European Women's Handball Championship, but did not become a member of the narrow squad.
