= Anett Kisfaludy =

Hungarian handball player (born 1990)

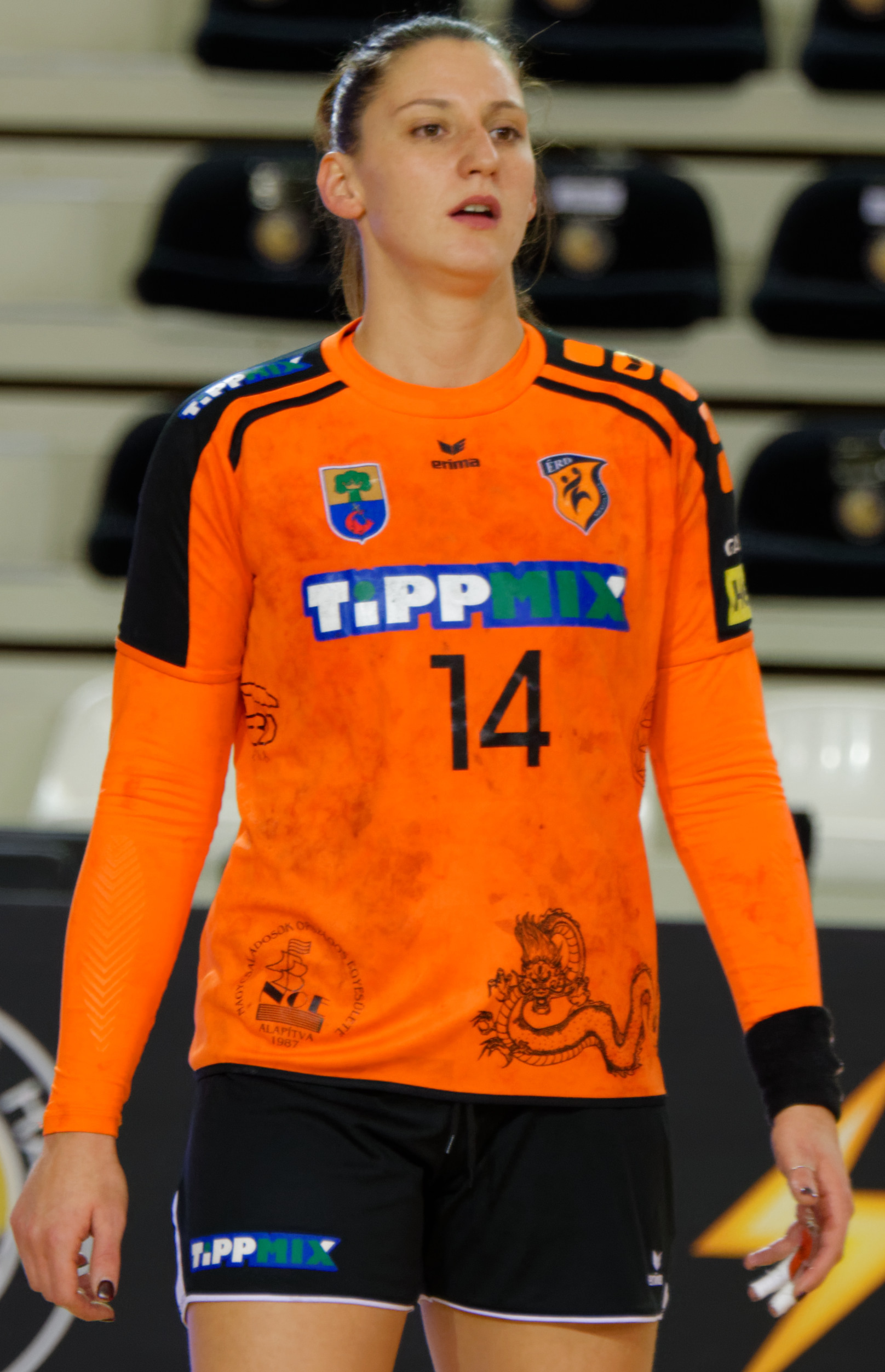
- 18 November 2017

Personal information
- Nationality: Hungarian
- Born: 31 August 1990 (age 36) Kapuvár, Hungary
- Height: 1.82 m (6 ft 0 in)

Sport
- Sport: Handball
- Position: Pivot
- Current club: MOL Esztergom
- Number: 14

Senior clubs
- Years: Team
- 2005–2010: Győri ETO KC
- 2008: → VKLSE Győr (loan)
- 2010: → Békéscsabai ENKSE (loan)
- 2010–2020: Érd NK
- 2020–2024: Ferencváros
- 2024–: MOL Esztergom
National team
Years	Team	Apps	(Gls)
2011–	Hungary	47	(56)
Medal record
Junior European Championship
Silver medal – second place	2009 Hungary

Anett Kisfaludy (born 31 August 1990) is a Hungarian handballer for MOL Esztergom and the Hungarian national team.

She was selected for the Hungarian national team first time in the friendly tournament Pannon Cup, and made her international debut on 24 April 2011 against Brazil.

== Achievements ==
- Nemzeti Bajnokság I:
  - Winner: 2009, 2021
- Magyar Kupa:
  - Winner: 2009
  - Bronze Medallist: 2010
- EHF Champions League:
  - Finalist: 2009, 2023
- Junior European Championship:
  - Silver Medallist: 2009
