= Hanna Popaja =

Swedish handball player (born 2002)

Personal information
- Full name: Hanna Popaja
- Nationality: Swedish
- Born: 29 June 2002 (age 24) Malmö, Sweden
- Height: 1.75 m (5 ft 9 in)

Sport
- Sport: Handball
- Position: Goalkeeper
- Current club: Ystads IF

Senior clubs
- Years: Team
- 2019–2023: Lugi HF
- 2023–: Ystads IF
Medal record
Youth European Championship
Silver medal – second place	2019 Slovenia

Hanna Popaja (born 29 June 2002) is a Swedish female handball player who plays for Swedish club Ystads IF.

She also represented Sweden in the 2019 European Women's U-17 Handball Championship, where she received silver. She was awarded to the All-Star Team, as best goalkeeper of the tournament.

== Achievements ==
- Youth European Championship:
  - Silver Medalist: 2019

== Individual awards ==
- All-Star Team Best Goalkeeper of the Youth European Championship: 2019
