= Luca Faragó =

Hungarian handball player (born 2002)

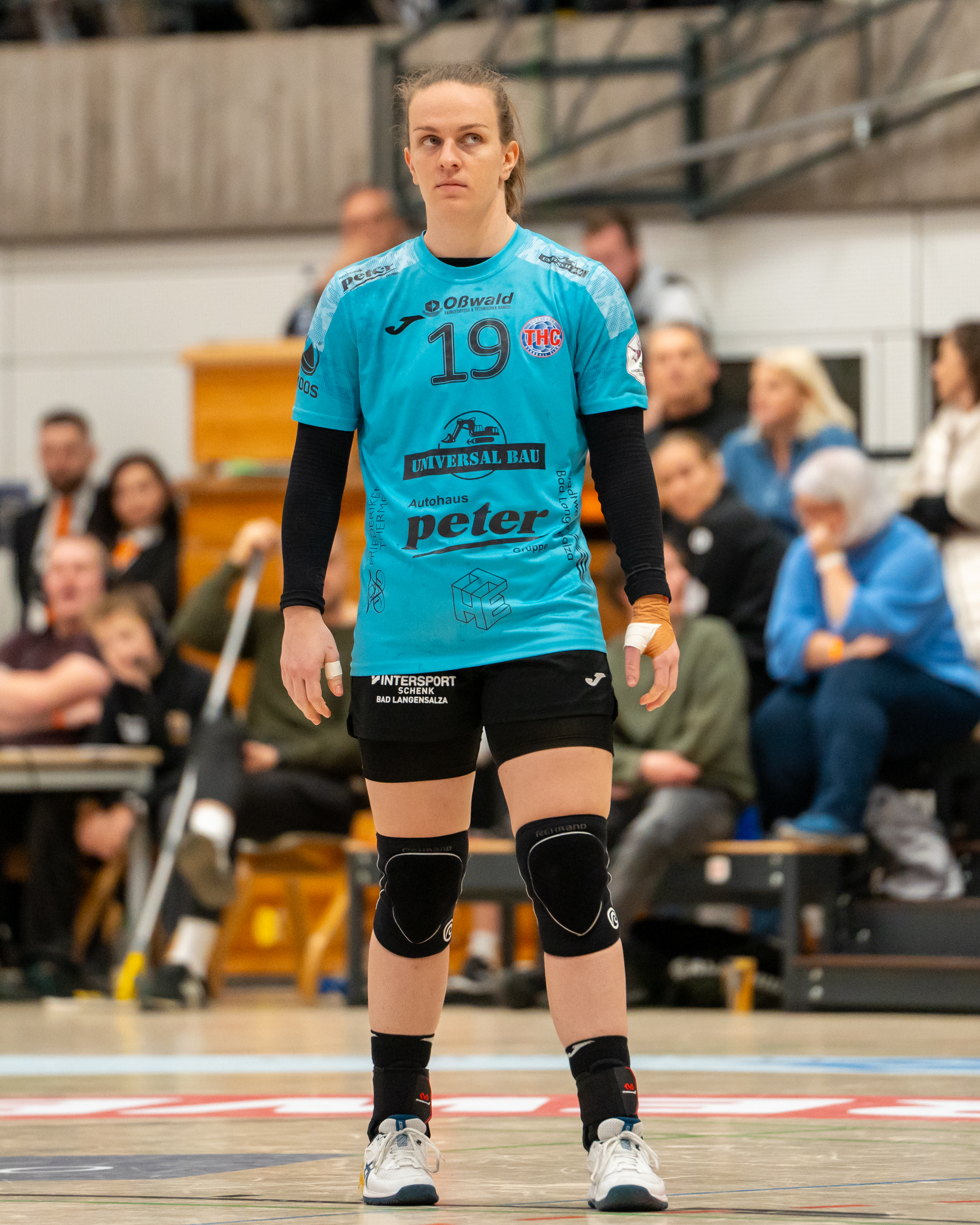

Personal information
- Nationality: Hungarian
- Born: 11 October 2002 (age 24) Körmend, Hungary
- Height: 1.74 m (5 ft 9 in)

Sport
- Sport: Handball
- Position: Pivot
- Current club: Mosonmagyaróvári KC SE
- Number: 20

Youth career
- Years: Team
- 2012–2014: Körmendi DMTE

Senior clubs
- Years: Team
- 2014–2017: Körmendi DMTE
- 2017–2020: NEKA
- 2020–2021: Boglári Akadémia-SZISE
- 2021–2022: Vasas SC
- 2022–: Mosonmagyaróvári KC SE
- 2025–2026: → Thüringer HC (loan)
National team
Years	Team	Apps	(Gls)
2025–	Hungary	1	(1)
Medal record
Junior European Championship
Gold medal – first place	2021 Slovenia
Youth European Championship
Gold medal – first place	2019 Slovenia
European Women's U-16 Handball Championship
Gold medal – first place	2018 Sweden
Junior World Championship
Silver medal – second place	2022 Slovenia

Luca Faragó (born 11 October 2002) is a Hungarian handballer for Mosonmagyaróvári KC SE and the Hungarian national team.

== Career ==
=== Club ===
Luca started her career in Körmendi DMTE in 2012. In the summer of 2017, she joined the National Handball Academy (NEKA) team. From 2018, in addition to the youth championship, he also played a role in the adult team in the Nemzeti Bajnokság I/B. In the spring of 2020, Szent István SE (SZISE) and the National Handball Academy (NEKA) entered into a strategic cooperation, according to which they will start a joint team in the women's handball Nemzeti Bajnokság I in the 2020/21 season. In Nemzeti Bajnokság I, the team started as Boglári Akadémia-SZISE. Luca scored 28 goals in 26 games in the 2020/21 season, her first top-flight season. At the end of the season, the team was relegated from the first division, but Luca was signed by Vasas SC. Luca scored 50 goals in 26 games in the 2021/22 season. At the end of the season, the team was relegated from the first division, but Luca was signed by Mosonmagyaróvári KC SE, the starting EHF European League team. She scored 4 goals in the 2022/23 season, 4 goals in the 2023/24 season, and 10 goals in the 2024/25 season in the EHF European League. Her club loaned her to the German team Thüringer HC for the 2025/26 season.

=== National team ===
In June 2018, she won a gold medal with the Hungarian women's youth handball team at the Open U16 European Championship in Sweden. In the final, the Hungarian team won overtime against the French 31–30. In August 2019, she became Youth European Championship with the women's youth handball team after the Hungary women's national youth handball team defeated the Sweden women's national youth handball team 28–24 in the final. In July 2021, he won a gold medal at the Junior European Championship held in Slovenia after the Hungary women's national junior handball team defeated the Russia women's national junior handball team 31–22 in the final. In July 2022, she won a silver medal with the national team at the Junior World Championship held in Slovenia, after the Hungary women's national junior handball team lost to the Norway women's national junior handball team 31–29 in the final. She was included in the large squad of the 2023 World Women's Handball Championship, but in the end he will not become a member of the narrow squad. She was included in the large squad of the 2024 European Women's Handball Championship, but in the end he will not become a member of the narrow squad. She made her debut for the Hungarian women's adult national team in Budapest in March 2025 in a warm-up match against the Ukrainian national team, in which she scored 1 goals. He was included in the large squad of the 2025 World Women's Handball Championship, but in the end he will not become a member of the narrow squad.

== Personal life ==
Has a younger sister, Lea, who is also a national handball player on the a left back position.

== Honours ==
=== National team ===
- Junior European Championship:
  - Gold: 2021
- Youth European Championship:
  - Gold: 2019
- European Women's U-16 Handball Championship:
  - Gold: 2018
- Junior World Championship:
  - Silver: 2022

=== Club ===
NEKA

- Nemzeti Bajnokság I/B
  - Silver: 2019
