= Lea Faragó =

Hungarian handball player (born 2005)

Personal information
- Nationality: Hungarian
- Born: 22 July 2005 (age 21) Körmend, Hungary
- Height: 1.75 m (5 ft 9 in)

Sport
- Sport: Handball
- Position: Left back
- Current club: Esztergomi KC
- Number: 30

Youth career
- Years: Team
- 2014–2019: Körmendi DMTE
- 2019–2021: NEKA

Senior clubs
- Years: Team
- 2021–2024: NEKA
- 2024–: Esztergomi KC
National team
Years	Team	Apps	(Gls)
2025–	Hungary	8	(21)
Medal record
European Youth Olympic Festival
Gold medal – first place	2022 Slovakia
Junior World Championship
Silver medal – second place	2024 North Macedonia

Lea Faragó (22 July 2005) is a Hungarian handballer for Esztergomi KC and the Hungarian national team.

== Career ==
=== Club ===
Lea started her career in Körmendi DMTE in 2014. In the summer of 2019, he joined the National Handball Academy (NEKA) team. From 2021, in addition to the youth championship, he also played a role in the adult team in the Nemzeti Bajnokság I/B. In 2022, they became silver medalists and were promoted to the Nemzeti Bajnokság I. In 2022/23, her first top-flight season, she scored 2 goals in 13 games. She scored 125 goals in 23 games in the 2023/24 season. In the summer of 2024, she transferred to Esztergomi KC.

=== National team ===
In 2022, she won a gold medal at the European Youth Olympic Festival. In June 2024, she won a silver medal with the national team at the Junior World Championship held in North Macedonia, after the Hungary women's national junior handball team lost to the France women's national junior handball team 29–26 in the final. He was included in the large squad of the 2024 European Women's Handball Championship, but in the end he will not become a member of the narrow squad. She made her debut for the Hungarian women's adult national team in Budapest in March 2025 in a warm-up match against the Ukrainian national team, in which she scored 2 goals.

== Personal life ==
She has an older sister, Luca, who is also a national handball player on the a line player position.

== Honours ==
=== National team ===
- European Youth Olympic Festival (EYOF):
  - Gold: 2022
- Junior World Championship:
  - Silver: 2024

=== Club ===
NEKA

- Nemzeti Bajnokság I/B
  - Silver: 2022

=== Individual ===
- All-Star Left Back of the Junior World Championship: 2024
