= Apollónia Szmolek =

Hungarian handball player (born 2002)

Personal information
- Nationality: Hungarian
- Born: 8 August 2002 (age 24) Szombathely, Hungary
- Height: 1.87 m (6 ft 2 in)

Sport
- Sport: Handball
- Position: Pivot
- Current club: Esztergomi KC

Youth career
- Years: Team
- 2016–2018: Szombathelyi KKA

Senior clubs
- Years: Team
- 2018–2025: Szombathelyi KKA
- 2025–: Esztergomi KC
National team
Years	Team	Apps	(Gls)
2025–	Hungary	13	(7)

Apollónia Szmolek (born 8 August 2002) is a Hungarian handballer for Esztergomi KC and the Hungarian national team.

== Career ==
=== Club ===
Apollónia started her career in Szombathelyi KKA in 2016. From 2018, in addition to the youth championship, he also played a role in the adult team in the Nemzeti Bajnokság I/B. In 2019, they became gold medalists and were promoted to the Nemzeti Bajnokság I. After 3 seasons, the team was relegated to the Nemzeti Bajnokság I/B at the end of the 2021/22 season. During these 3 first division seasons, Apollónia played little in the senior team, playing mostly in the club's youth teams. From the 2022/23 season, she became a key player for the senior team, winning bronze medals in 2023 and gold medals in 2024 in the Nemzeti Bajnokság I/B and advancing to Nemzeti Bajnokság I. She scored 74 goals in the 2022/23 season and 121 goals in the 2023/23 season. In the summer of 2025, she transferred to Esztergomi KC, which finished third in the previous championship and therefore competed in the EHF European League.

=== National team ===
He was included in the large squad of the 2024 European Women's Handball Championship, but in the end he will not become a member of the narrow squad. She made her debut for the Hungarian women's adult national team in Budapest in March 2025 in a warm-up match against the Ukrainian national team, in which she scored 1 goals.

== Honours ==
=== Club ===
Szombathelyi KKA

- Nemzeti Bajnokság I/B
  - Gold: 2019, 2024
  - Bronze: 2023
