= Tyra Axnér =

Swedish handball player (born 2002)

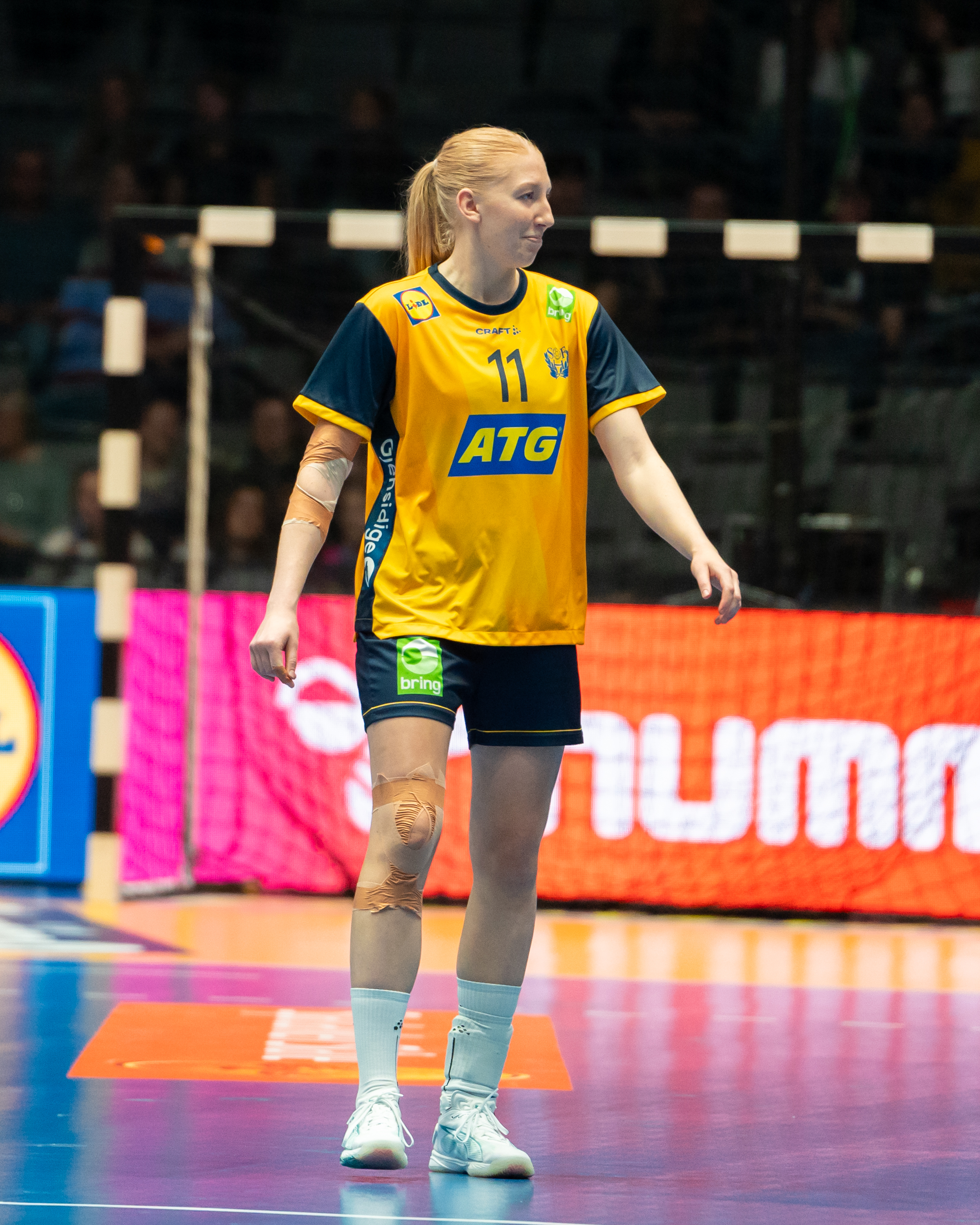

Personal information
- Nationality: Swedish
- Born: 18 March 2002 (age 24) Minden, Germany
- Height: 1.76 m (5 ft 9 in)

Sport
- Sport: Handball
- Position: Left back
- Current club: CSM București
- Number: 9

Senior clubs
- Years: Team
- 2019–2021: Lugi HF
- 2021–2022: Herning-Ikast Håndbold
- 2022–2024: Nykøbing Falster
- 2024–2026: Metz Handball
- 2026–: CSM București
National team
Years	Team	Apps	(Gls)
2022–	Sweden	72	(156)
Medal record
Youth European Championship
Silver medal – second place	2019 Slovenia

Tyra Axnér (born 18 March 2002) is a German-born Swedish handball player who plays for CSM București and the Swedish national team.

She represented Sweden at the 2019 European Women's U-17 Handball Championship, where she received silver. She also participated at the 2021 Women's U-19 European Handball Championship.

She is the daughter of the Swedish women's national team coach and former handball player Tomas Axnér. She was born in Minden in Germany, as her father was active playing in GWD Minden at the time. Her mother is also of partial French descent.

== Achievements ==
- EHF Champions League:
  - Winner: 2026
- EHF European League:
  - Finalist: 2023

=== Individual awards ===
- All-Star Team Best Left Back of the Youth European Championship: 2019
