= Alicia Gogîrlă =

Romanian handball player (born 2003)

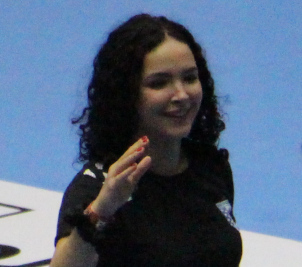

Personal information
- Full name: Alicia Maria Gogîrlă
- Nationality: Romanian
- Born: 17 January 2003 (age 23) Râmnicu Vâlcea, Romania
- Height: 1.83 m (6 ft 0 in)

Sport
- Sport: Handball
- Position: Right Back
- Current club: SCM Craiova
- Number: 7

Senior clubs
- Years: Team
- 2019–2021: Corona Brașov
- 2021–2023: CSM București
- 2023–2025: SCM Râmnicu Vâlcea
- 2025–: SCM Craiova
National team
Years	Team	Apps	(Gls)
–	Romania	17	(21)
- Updated on 27 October 2025

Alicia Maria Gogîrlă (born 17 January 2003) is a Romanian handball player for SCM Craiova and the Romanian national team.

Originally a member of Corona Brașov's academy system, Gogîrlă was promoted to the first team at the beginning of the 2019–20 season making her professional debut at age 16.

== International honours ==
- Youth European Open Championship:
  - Bronze Medalist: 2018

== Awards and recognition ==
- All-Star Right Back of the Youth European Open Championship: 2018

== Personal life ==
She is the daughter of handball legend Simona Gogîrlă. Gogîrlă started playing handball under the guidance of handball coach Maria Ciulei.
