= 2019 European Women's U-17 Handball Championship =

Handball competition

2019 European U-17 Handball Championship

Tournament details
- Host country: Slovenia
- Venues: 2 (in 1 host city)
- Dates: 1–11 August
- Teams: 16 (from 1 confederation)

Final positions
- Champions: Hungary (1st title)
- Runners-up: Sweden
- Third place: France
- Fourth place: Denmark

Tournament statistics
- Matches played: 56
- Goals scored: 2,900 (51.79 per match)
- Attendance: 11,186 (200 per match)
- Top scorer(s): (Austria) Katarina Pandza (66 goals)

Awards
- Best player: (Hungary) Blanka Kajdon

The 2019 European Women's U-17 Handball Championship was the 14th edition, which took place in Celje, Slovenia.

== Qualification ==
Competition	Dates	Host	Vacancies	Qualified
Women’s 17 EHF EURO 2017	10–20 August 2017	(Slovakia) Michalovce	14	Germany; Norway; Hungary; France; Russia; Denmark; Romania; Spain; Sweden; Netherlands; Montenegro; Slovakia; Croatia; Austria
Women’s 17 EHF Championship 2017	31 July – 6 August 2017	(North Macedonia) Skopje	1	Slovenia
Women’s 17 EHF Championship 2017	14–20 August 2017	(Lithuania) Klaipėda	1	Portugal

== Draw ==
The draw was held on 28 February 2019 in Celje.

Pot 1	Pot 2	Pot 3	Pot 4
Germany; Norway; Hungary; France	Russia; Denmark; Romania; Spain	Sweden; Netherlands; Montenegro; Slovakia	Croatia; Austria; Portugal; Slovenia

== Preliminary round ==
All times are local (UTC+2).

=== Group A ===
Pos	Team	Pld	W	D	L	GF	GA	GD	Pts	Qualification
1	Sweden	3	3	0	0	93	63	+30	6	Main round
2	Norway	3	2	0	1	84	80	+4	4	Main round
3	Spain	3	0	1	2	70	85	−15	1	Intermediate round
4	Croatia	3	0	1	2	73	92	−19	1	Intermediate round

Source: EHF
Rules for classification: 1) points; 2) head-to-head points; 3) head-to-head goal difference; 4) head-to-head goals scored; 5) goal difference; 6) goals scored; 7) draw.

1 August 2019; 13:00	Norway	19–31	Sweden	Zlatorog Arena, Celje; Attendance: 100; Referees: Ivanović, Vujisić (MNE)
1 August 2019; 13:00	Alvestad 5	(10–16)	Axnér 8	Zlatorog Arena, Celje; Attendance: 100; Referees: Ivanović, Vujisić (MNE)
1 August 2019; 13:00	1× (yellow card) 5× (suspension)	Report	1× (yellow card) 6× (suspension)	Zlatorog Arena, Celje; Attendance: 100; Referees: Ivanović, Vujisić (MNE)

1 August 2019; 15:00	Spain	25–25	Croatia	Zlatorog Arena, Celje; Attendance: 71; Referees: Hannes, Hannes (GER)
1 August 2019; 15:00	Casia 6	(8–10)	Buljan, Škarić 5	Zlatorog Arena, Celje; Attendance: 71; Referees: Hannes, Hannes (GER)
1 August 2019; 15:00	1× (yellow card) 5× (suspension)	Report	3× (yellow card) 7× (suspension)	Zlatorog Arena, Celje; Attendance: 71; Referees: Hannes, Hannes (GER)

2 August 2019; 13:00	Croatia	27–39	Norway	Zlatorog Arena, Celje; Attendance: 100; Referees: Stokes, Bartlett (GBR)
2 August 2019; 13:00	Škarić 7	(12–18)	Gregersen 12	Zlatorog Arena, Celje; Attendance: 100; Referees: Stokes, Bartlett (GBR)
2 August 2019; 13:00	3× (yellow card) 7× (suspension)	Report	2× (yellow card) 3× (suspension)	Zlatorog Arena, Celje; Attendance: 100; Referees: Stokes, Bartlett (GBR)

2 August 2019; 15:00	Sweden	34–23	Spain	Zlatorog Arena, Celje; Attendance: 150; Referees: Backović, Palačković (SLO)
2 August 2019; 15:00	Axnér 10	(16–13)	More 7	Zlatorog Arena, Celje; Attendance: 150; Referees: Backović, Palačković (SLO)
2 August 2019; 15:00	2× (yellow card) 5× (suspension) 1× (red card)	Report	3× (yellow card) 3× (suspension)	Zlatorog Arena, Celje; Attendance: 150; Referees: Backović, Palačković (SLO)

4 August 2019; 13:00	Norway	26–22	Spain	Zlatorog Arena, Celje; Attendance: 85; Referees: Loshak, Shajbakov (UKR)
4 August 2019; 13:00	Gregersen, Henriksen 5	(13–12)	Benítez, Nuez 5	Zlatorog Arena, Celje; Attendance: 85; Referees: Loshak, Shajbakov (UKR)
4 August 2019; 13:00	2× (yellow card) 4× (suspension)	Report	4× (suspension)	Zlatorog Arena, Celje; Attendance: 85; Referees: Loshak, Shajbakov (UKR)

4 August 2019; 15:00	Sweden	28–21	Croatia	Zlatorog Arena, Celje; Attendance: 150; Referees: Mertinian, Syrepisios (GRE)
4 August 2019; 15:00	Axnér 9	(14–8)	Zrnić 4	Zlatorog Arena, Celje; Attendance: 150; Referees: Mertinian, Syrepisios (GRE)
4 August 2019; 15:00	2× (yellow card) 2× (suspension)	Report	4× (yellow card) 7× (suspension)	Zlatorog Arena, Celje; Attendance: 150; Referees: Mertinian, Syrepisios (GRE)

=== Group B ===
Pos	Team	Pld	W	D	L	GF	GA	GD	Pts	Qualification
1	Hungary	3	3	0	0	103	73	+30	6	Main round
2	Austria	3	2	0	1	77	80	−3	4	Main round
3	Slovakia	3	1	0	2	72	89	−17	2	Intermediate round
4	Romania	3	0	0	3	86	96	−10	0	Intermediate round

Source: EHF
Rules for classification: 1) points; 2) head-to-head points; 3) head-to-head goal difference; 4) head-to-head goals scored; 5) goal difference; 6) goals scored; 7) draw.

1 August 2019; 17:00	Hungary	31–18	Slovakia	Zlatorog Arena, Celje; Attendance: 100; Referees: Backović, Palačković (SLO)
1 August 2019; 17:00	Koronczai 8	(13–10)	Lancz 7	Zlatorog Arena, Celje; Attendance: 100; Referees: Backović, Palačković (SLO)
1 August 2019; 17:00	2× (yellow card) 5× (suspension)	Report	2× (yellow card) 6× (suspension)	Zlatorog Arena, Celje; Attendance: 100; Referees: Backović, Palačković (SLO)

1 August 2019; 19:00	Romania	24–26	Austria	Zlatorog Arena, Celje; Attendance: 80; Referees: Jakovljević, Sando (SRB)
1 August 2019; 19:00	Borș 7	(12–15)	K. Pandza 10	Zlatorog Arena, Celje; Attendance: 80; Referees: Jakovljević, Sando (SRB)
1 August 2019; 19:00	1× (yellow card) 8× (suspension)	Report	1× (yellow card) 6× (suspension) 1× (red card)	Zlatorog Arena, Celje; Attendance: 80; Referees: Jakovljević, Sando (SRB)

2 August 2019; 17:00	Austria	23–33	Hungary	Zlatorog Arena, Celje; Attendance: 100; Referees: Lindenbaum, Laron (ISR)
2 August 2019; 17:00	K. Pandza 7	(10–17)	Kajdon 10	Zlatorog Arena, Celje; Attendance: 100; Referees: Lindenbaum, Laron (ISR)
2 August 2019; 17:00	2× (yellow card) 8× (suspension)	Report	1× (yellow card) 9× (suspension) 1× (red card)	Zlatorog Arena, Celje; Attendance: 100; Referees: Lindenbaum, Laron (ISR)

2 August 2019; 19:00	Slovakia	31–30	Romania	Zlatorog Arena, Celje; Attendance: 100; Referees: Hannes, Hannes (GER)
2 August 2019; 19:00	Lancz 10	(16–17)	Gogîrlă 12	Zlatorog Arena, Celje; Attendance: 100; Referees: Hannes, Hannes (GER)
2 August 2019; 19:00	1× (yellow card) 4× (suspension) 1× (red card)	Report	2× (yellow card) 7× (suspension)	Zlatorog Arena, Celje; Attendance: 100; Referees: Hannes, Hannes (GER)

4 August 2019; 17:00	Hungary	39–32	Romania	Zlatorog Arena, Celje; Attendance: 210; Referees: Backović, Palačković (SLO)
4 August 2019; 17:00	Kajdon 8	(21–16)	Gogîrlă 8	Zlatorog Arena, Celje; Attendance: 210; Referees: Backović, Palačković (SLO)
4 August 2019; 17:00	2× (yellow card) 5× (suspension)	Report	2× (yellow card) 7× (suspension)	Zlatorog Arena, Celje; Attendance: 210; Referees: Backović, Palačković (SLO)

4 August 2019; 19:00	Slovakia	23–28	Austria	Zlatorog Arena, Celje; Attendance: 300; Referees: Ivanović, Vujisić (MNE)
4 August 2019; 19:00	Lancz 8	(11–13)	K. Pandza 8	Zlatorog Arena, Celje; Attendance: 300; Referees: Ivanović, Vujisić (MNE)
4 August 2019; 19:00	1× (yellow card) 9× (suspension) 1× (red card)	Report	1× (yellow card) 7× (suspension)	Zlatorog Arena, Celje; Attendance: 300; Referees: Ivanović, Vujisić (MNE)

=== Group C ===
Pos	Team	Pld	W	D	L	GF	GA	GD	Pts	Qualification
1	Germany	3	2	0	1	80	76	+4	4	Main round
2	Denmark	3	1	1	1	81	78	+3	3	Main round
3	Netherlands	3	1	1	1	86	86	0	3	Intermediate round
4	Portugal	3	1	0	2	83	90	−7	2	Intermediate round

Source: EHF
Rules for classification: 1) points; 2) head-to-head points; 3) head-to-head goal difference; 4) head-to-head goals scored; 5) goal difference; 6) goals scored; 7) draw.

1 August 2019; 13:00	Germany	22–21	Netherlands	Golovec Hall, Celje; Attendance: 200; Referees: Loshak, Shajbakov (UKR)
1 August 2019; 13:00	Kusian 5	(10–11)	Staal 7	Golovec Hall, Celje; Attendance: 200; Referees: Loshak, Shajbakov (UKR)
1 August 2019; 13:00	2× (yellow card) 3× (suspension)	Report	2× (yellow card) 3× (suspension)	Golovec Hall, Celje; Attendance: 200; Referees: Loshak, Shajbakov (UKR)

1 August 2019; 15:00	Denmark	21–24	Portugal	Golovec Hall, Celje; Attendance: 150; Referees: Kulović, Škaljić (BIH)
1 August 2019; 15:00	Esseman-Beck, Wierzba 5	(12–13)	Sequeira 9	Golovec Hall, Celje; Attendance: 150; Referees: Kulović, Škaljić (BIH)
1 August 2019; 15:00	1× (yellow card) 2× (suspension)	Report	2× (yellow card) 2× (suspension)	Golovec Hall, Celje; Attendance: 150; Referees: Kulović, Škaljić (BIH)

2 August 2019; 13:00	Portugal	25–34	Germany	Golovec Hall, Celje; Attendance: 90; Referees: Jakovljević, Sando (SRB)
2 August 2019; 13:00	Marques 7	(14–20)	Kusian, Rott 9	Golovec Hall, Celje; Attendance: 90; Referees: Jakovljević, Sando (SRB)
2 August 2019; 13:00	1× (yellow card) 7× (suspension)	Report	1× (yellow card) 3× (suspension)	Golovec Hall, Celje; Attendance: 90; Referees: Jakovljević, Sando (SRB)

2 August 2019; 15:00	Netherlands	30–30	Denmark	Golovec Hall, Celje; Attendance: 200; Referees: Mertinian, Syrepisios (GRE)
2 August 2019; 15:00	Staal 6	(11–13)	Møller 10	Golovec Hall, Celje; Attendance: 200; Referees: Mertinian, Syrepisios (GRE)
2 August 2019; 15:00	2× (yellow card) 7× (suspension)	Report	2× (yellow card) 6× (suspension)	Golovec Hall, Celje; Attendance: 200; Referees: Mertinian, Syrepisios (GRE)

4 August 2019; 13:00	Germany	24–30	Denmark	Golovec Hall, Celje; Attendance: 200; Referees: Kulović, Škaljić (BIH)
4 August 2019; 13:00	Rott 6	(13–14)	Wierzba 12	Golovec Hall, Celje; Attendance: 200; Referees: Kulović, Škaljić (BIH)
4 August 2019; 13:00	3× (yellow card) 8× (suspension)	Report	1× (yellow card) 4× (suspension)	Golovec Hall, Celje; Attendance: 200; Referees: Kulović, Škaljić (BIH)

4 August 2019; 15:00	Netherlands	35–34	Portugal	Golovec Hall, Celje; Attendance: 200; Referees: Lidacka, Lesiak (POL)
4 August 2019; 15:00	Daleman, Staal 7	(15–16)	Costa 11	Golovec Hall, Celje; Attendance: 200; Referees: Lidacka, Lesiak (POL)
4 August 2019; 15:00	1× (yellow card) 7× (suspension)	Report	3× (yellow card) 7× (suspension) 1× (red card)	Golovec Hall, Celje; Attendance: 200; Referees: Lidacka, Lesiak (POL)

=== Group D ===
Pos	Team	Pld	W	D	L	GF	GA	GD	Pts	Qualification
1	France	3	3	0	0	79	53	+26	6	Main round
2	Russia	3	2	0	1	81	71	+10	4	Main round
3	Slovenia (H)	3	1	0	2	61	75	−14	2	Intermediate round
4	Montenegro	3	0	0	3	59	81	−22	0	Intermediate round

Source: EHF
Rules for classification: 1) points; 2) head-to-head points; 3) head-to-head goal difference; 4) head-to-head goals scored; 5) goal difference; 6) goals scored; 7) draw.
(H) Hosts

1 August 2019; 17:00	France	30–15	Montenegro	Golovec Hall, Celje; Attendance: 150; Referees: Lindenbaum, Laron (ISR)
1 August 2019; 17:00	Grandveau 5	(13–5)	Vukčević 4	Golovec Hall, Celje; Attendance: 150; Referees: Lindenbaum, Laron (ISR)
1 August 2019; 17:00	1× (yellow card) 3× (suspension)	Report	2× (yellow card) 6× (suspension)	Golovec Hall, Celje; Attendance: 150; Referees: Lindenbaum, Laron (ISR)

1 August 2019; 19:30	Russia	33–20	Slovenia	Golovec Hall, Celje; Attendance: 800; Referees: Lidacka, Lesiak (POL)
1 August 2019; 19:30	three players 5	(14–10)	Novak 6	Golovec Hall, Celje; Attendance: 800; Referees: Lidacka, Lesiak (POL)
1 August 2019; 19:30	2× (yellow card) 7× (suspension)	Report	2× (yellow card) 4× (suspension)	Golovec Hall, Celje; Attendance: 800; Referees: Lidacka, Lesiak (POL)

2 August 2019; 17:00	Montenegro	19–23	Russia	Golovec Hall, Celje; Attendance: 150; Referees: Kulović, Škaljić (BIH)
2 August 2019; 17:00	Krivokapić 6	(11–12)	Baeva, Zakordonskaya 4	Golovec Hall, Celje; Attendance: 150; Referees: Kulović, Škaljić (BIH)
2 August 2019; 17:00	4× (yellow card) 3× (suspension)	Report	3× (yellow card) 3× (suspension)	Golovec Hall, Celje; Attendance: 150; Referees: Kulović, Škaljić (BIH)

2 August 2019; 19:00	Slovenia	13–17	France	Golovec Hall, Celje; Attendance: 500; Referees: Loshak, Shajbakov (UKR)
2 August 2019; 19:00	Kadič 4	(8–7)	Modenel 6	Golovec Hall, Celje; Attendance: 500; Referees: Loshak, Shajbakov (UKR)
2 August 2019; 19:00	2× (yellow card) 2× (suspension)	Report	1× (yellow card) 2× (suspension)	Golovec Hall, Celje; Attendance: 500; Referees: Loshak, Shajbakov (UKR)

4 August 2019; 17:00	France	32–25	Russia	Golovec Hall, Celje; Attendance: 200; Referees: Jakovljević, Sando (SRB)
4 August 2019; 17:00	Grandveau 9	(17–11)	Baeva 8	Golovec Hall, Celje; Attendance: 200; Referees: Jakovljević, Sando (SRB)
4 August 2019; 17:00	1× (yellow card) 5× (suspension)	Report	1× (yellow card) 2× (suspension)	Golovec Hall, Celje; Attendance: 200; Referees: Jakovljević, Sando (SRB)

4 August 2019; 19:00	Montenegro	25–28	Slovenia	Golovec Hall, Celje; Attendance: 200; Referees: Stokes, Bartlett (GBR)
4 August 2019; 19:00	A. Marsenić 7	(11–11)	Rudman 7	Golovec Hall, Celje; Attendance: 200; Referees: Stokes, Bartlett (GBR)
4 August 2019; 19:00	2× (yellow card) 7× (suspension)	Report	1× (yellow card) 5× (suspension)	Golovec Hall, Celje; Attendance: 200; Referees: Stokes, Bartlett (GBR)

== Intermediate round ==
=== Group III ===
Pos	Team	Pld	W	D	L	GF	GA	GD	Pts	Qualification
1	Slovakia	3	2	0	1	80	81	−1	4 (Note: Slovakia 31–30 Romania)	9–12th place semifinals
2	Romania	3	2	0	1	85	73	+12	4	9–12th place semifinals
3	Croatia	3	1	1	1	71	73	−2	3	13–16th place semifinals
4	Spain	3	0	1	2	72	81	−9	1	13–16th place semifinals

Source: EHF
Rules for classification: 1) points; 2) head-to-head points; 3) head-to-head goal difference; 4) head-to-head goals scored; 5) goal difference; 6) goals scored; 7) draw.
Notes:

6 August 2019; 15:00	Spain	25–28	Slovakia	Golovec Hall, Celje; Attendance: 85; Referees: Stokes, Bartlett (GBR)
6 August 2019; 15:00	Benítez 6	(14–14)	Lancz, Pint 8	Golovec Hall, Celje; Attendance: 85; Referees: Stokes, Bartlett (GBR)
6 August 2019; 15:00	2× (yellow card) 2× (suspension)	Report	2× (yellow card) 4× (suspension)	Golovec Hall, Celje; Attendance: 85; Referees: Stokes, Bartlett (GBR)

6 August 2019; 17:00	Croatia	20–27	Romania	Golovec Hall, Celje; Attendance: 100; Referees: Lindenbaum, Laron (ISR)
6 August 2019; 17:00	Petković, Zrnić 4	(13–14)	Necula 8	Golovec Hall, Celje; Attendance: 100; Referees: Lindenbaum, Laron (ISR)
6 August 2019; 17:00	1× (yellow card) 6× (suspension)	Report	1× (yellow card) 7× (suspension)	Golovec Hall, Celje; Attendance: 100; Referees: Lindenbaum, Laron (ISR)

7 August 2019; 15:00	Slovakia	21–26	Croatia	Golovec Hall, Celje; Attendance: 150; Referees: Mertinian, Syrepisios (GRE)
7 August 2019; 15:00	Dvorščáková 5	(12–13)	Josipović 6	Golovec Hall, Celje; Attendance: 150; Referees: Mertinian, Syrepisios (GRE)
7 August 2019; 15:00	1× (yellow card) 4× (suspension)	Report	1× (yellow card) 7× (suspension)	Golovec Hall, Celje; Attendance: 150; Referees: Mertinian, Syrepisios (GRE)

7 August 2019; 17:00	Romania	28–22	Spain	Golovec Hall, Celje; Attendance: 150; Referees: Hannes, Hannes (GER)
7 August 2019; 17:00	Gogîrlă 10	(12–11)	Benítez, Mallo 5	Golovec Hall, Celje; Attendance: 150; Referees: Hannes, Hannes (GER)
7 August 2019; 17:00	2× (yellow card) 7× (suspension)	Report	2× (yellow card) 5× (suspension)	Golovec Hall, Celje; Attendance: 150; Referees: Hannes, Hannes (GER)

=== Group IV ===
Pos	Team	Pld	W	D	L	GF	GA	GD	Pts	Qualification
1	Slovenia (H)	3	3	0	0	83	68	+15	6	9–12th place semifinals
2	Montenegro	3	1	0	2	72	74	−2	2 (Note: Montenegro 2 Pts, +1 GD; Portugal 2 Pts, 0 GD; Netherlands 2 Pts, –1 GD)	9–12th place semifinals
3	Portugal	3	1	0	2	82	83	−1	2	13–16th place semifinals
4	Netherlands	3	1	0	2	76	88	−12	2	13–16th place semifinals

Source: EHF
Rules for classification: 1) points; 2) head-to-head points; 3) head-to-head goal difference; 4) head-to-head goals scored; 5) goal difference; 6) goals scored; 7) draw.
(H) Hosts
Notes:

6 August 2019; 13:00	Portugal	24–23	Montenegro	Golovec Hall, Celje; Attendance: 100; Referees: Mertinian, Syrepisios (GRE)
6 August 2019; 13:00	Sequeira 8	(12–11)	A. Marsenić 7	Golovec Hall, Celje; Attendance: 100; Referees: Mertinian, Syrepisios (GRE)
6 August 2019; 13:00	1× (yellow card) 4× (suspension)	Report	5× (suspension)	Golovec Hall, Celje; Attendance: 100; Referees: Mertinian, Syrepisios (GRE)

6 August 2019; 19:00	Netherlands	19–30	Slovenia	Golovec Hall, Celje; Attendance: 180; Referees: Kulović, Škaljić (BIH)
6 August 2019; 19:00	Staal 6	(12–15)	Kralj 6	Golovec Hall, Celje; Attendance: 180; Referees: Kulović, Škaljić (BIH)
6 August 2019; 19:00	2× (yellow card) 5× (suspension)	Report	7× (suspension)	Golovec Hall, Celje; Attendance: 180; Referees: Kulović, Škaljić (BIH)

7 August 2019; 13:00	Montenegro	24–22	Netherlands	Golovec Hall, Celje; Attendance: 150; Referees: Jakovljević, Sando (SRB)
7 August 2019; 13:00	Marsenić 6	(13–9)	Staal, Van de Ruit 6	Golovec Hall, Celje; Attendance: 150; Referees: Jakovljević, Sando (SRB)
7 August 2019; 13:00	1× (yellow card) 6× (suspension)	Report	2× (yellow card) 4× (suspension)	Golovec Hall, Celje; Attendance: 150; Referees: Jakovljević, Sando (SRB)

7 August 2019; 19:00	Slovenia	25–24	Portugal	Golovec Hall, Celje; Attendance: 500; Referees: Lindenbaum, Laron (ISR)
7 August 2019; 19:00	five players 3	(11–11)	Sequeira 6	Golovec Hall, Celje; Attendance: 500; Referees: Lindenbaum, Laron (ISR)
7 August 2019; 19:00	2× (yellow card) 3× (suspension)	Report	1× (yellow card) 5× (suspension)	Golovec Hall, Celje; Attendance: 500; Referees: Lindenbaum, Laron (ISR)

== Main round ==
=== Group I ===
Pos	Team	Pld	W	D	L	GF	GA	GD	Pts	Qualification
1	Hungary	3	3	0	0	87	72	+15	6	Semifinals
2	Sweden	3	2	0	1	88	66	+22	4	Semifinals
3	Norway	3	1	0	2	76	86	−10	2	5–8th place semifinals
4	Austria	3	0	0	3	71	98	−27	0	5–8th place semifinals

Source: EHF
Rules for classification: 1) points; 2) head-to-head points; 3) head-to-head goal difference; 4) head-to-head goals scored; 5) goal difference; 6) goals scored; 7) draw.

6 August 2019; 17:00	Norway	30–27	Austria	Zlatorog Arena, Celje; Attendance: 200; Referees: Hannes, Hannes (GER)
6 August 2019; 17:00	Celius 8	(11–12)	K. Pandza 12	Zlatorog Arena, Celje; Attendance: 200; Referees: Hannes, Hannes (GER)
6 August 2019; 17:00	2× (yellow card) 2× (suspension)	Report	1× (yellow card) 1× (suspension)	Zlatorog Arena, Celje; Attendance: 200; Referees: Hannes, Hannes (GER)

6 August 2019; 19:00	Sweden	22–26	Hungary	Zlatorog Arena, Celje; Attendance: 250; Referees: Lidacka, Lesiak (POL)
6 August 2019; 19:00	Wedenby 5	(15–17)	Koronczai 7	Zlatorog Arena, Celje; Attendance: 250; Referees: Lidacka, Lesiak (POL)
6 August 2019; 19:00	2× (yellow card) 2× (suspension)	Report	2× (yellow card) 4× (suspension)	Zlatorog Arena, Celje; Attendance: 250; Referees: Lidacka, Lesiak (POL)

7 August 2019; 17:00	Austria	21–35	Sweden	Zlatorog Arena, Celje; Attendance: 120; Referees: Stokes, Bartlett (GBR)
7 August 2019; 17:00	K. Pandza 7	(11–17)	Axnér 6	Zlatorog Arena, Celje; Attendance: 120; Referees: Stokes, Bartlett (GBR)
7 August 2019; 17:00	2× (yellow card) 3× (suspension)	Report	3× (yellow card) 4× (suspension)	Zlatorog Arena, Celje; Attendance: 120; Referees: Stokes, Bartlett (GBR)

7 August 2019; 19:00	Hungary	28–27	Norway	Zlatorog Arena, Celje; Attendance: 200; Referees: Ivanović, Vujisić (MNE)
7 August 2019; 19:00	Koronczai 9	(16–12)	Celius 6	Zlatorog Arena, Celje; Attendance: 200; Referees: Ivanović, Vujisić (MNE)
7 August 2019; 19:00	1× (yellow card) 2× (suspension)	Report	2× (yellow card) 2× (suspension)	Zlatorog Arena, Celje; Attendance: 200; Referees: Ivanović, Vujisić (MNE)

=== Group II ===
Pos	Team	Pld	W	D	L	GF	GA	GD	Pts	Qualification
1	France	3	3	0	0	74	61	+13	6	Semifinals
2	Denmark	3	1	1	1	68	64	+4	3	Semifinals
3	Russia	3	1	1	1	72	77	−5	3	5–8th place semifinals
4	Germany	3	0	0	3	67	79	−12	0	5–8th place semifinals

Source: EHF
Rules for classification: 1) points; 2) head-to-head points; 3) head-to-head goal difference; 4) head-to-head goals scored; 5) goal difference; 6) goals scored; 7) draw.

6 August 2019; 13:00	Denmark	23–23	Russia	Zlatorog Arena, Celje; Attendance: 150; Referees: Ivanović, Vujisić (MNE)
6 August 2019; 13:00	Møller 10	(10–11)	Baeva 6	Zlatorog Arena, Celje; Attendance: 150; Referees: Ivanović, Vujisić (MNE)
6 August 2019; 13:00	1× (yellow card) 1× (suspension)	Report	1× (yellow card) 4× (suspension)	Zlatorog Arena, Celje; Attendance: 150; Referees: Ivanović, Vujisić (MNE)

6 August 2019; 15:00	Germany	21–25	France	Zlatorog Arena, Celje; Attendance: 200; Referees: Backović, Palačković (SLO)
6 August 2019; 15:00	Rott 6	(12–10)	Bouktit 6	Zlatorog Arena, Celje; Attendance: 200; Referees: Backović, Palačković (SLO)
6 August 2019; 15:00	2× (yellow card) 4× (suspension)	Report	2× (yellow card) 2× (suspension)	Zlatorog Arena, Celje; Attendance: 200; Referees: Backović, Palačković (SLO)

7 August 2019; 13:00	Russia	24–22	Germany	Zlatorog Arena, Celje; Attendance: 85; Referees: Lidacka, Lesiak (POL)
7 August 2019; 13:00	Romanenko 6	(12–11)	Dreizler, Rott 5	Zlatorog Arena, Celje; Attendance: 85; Referees: Lidacka, Lesiak (POL)
7 August 2019; 13:00	2× (yellow card) 5× (suspension)	Report	2× (yellow card) 7× (suspension)	Zlatorog Arena, Celje; Attendance: 85; Referees: Lidacka, Lesiak (POL)

7 August 2019; 15:00	France	17–15	Denmark	Zlatorog Arena, Celje; Attendance: 150; Referees: Loshak, Shajbakov (UKR)
7 August 2019; 15:00	Bouktit 6	(10–9)	Handreck 5	Zlatorog Arena, Celje; Attendance: 150; Referees: Loshak, Shajbakov (UKR)
7 August 2019; 15:00	1× (yellow card) 5× (suspension)	Report	1× (yellow card) 1× (suspension)	Zlatorog Arena, Celje; Attendance: 150; Referees: Loshak, Shajbakov (UKR)

== Final round ==
=== Bracket ===
Championship bracket

Semifinals
9 August
Hungary	25
Denmark	21
9 August
France	19
Sweden	20

Final
11 August
Hungary	28
Sweden	24
Third place
11 August
Denmark	21
France	28

9th place bracket

9–12th place semifinals
9 August
Slovakia	25
Montenegro	31
9 August
Slovenia	23
Romania	20

9th place
10 August
Montenegro (p)	32
Slovenia	31
11th place
10 August
Slovakia	24
Romania	27

5th place bracket

5–8th place semifinals
9 August
Norway	28
Germany	20
9 August
Russia	36
Austria	33

5th place
10 August
Norway	26
Russia	35
7th place
10 August
Germany	32
Austria	22

13th place bracket

13–16th place semifinals
9 August
Croatia	28
Netherlands	26
9 August
Portugal	33
Spain	23

13th place
10 August
Croatia	29
Portugal	30
15th place
10 August
Netherlands	31
Spain	27

=== 13–16th place semifinals ===
9 August 2019; 12:00	Croatia	28–26	Netherlands	Golovec Hall, Celje; Attendance: 100; Referees: Backović, Palačković (SLO)
9 August 2019; 12:00	Buljan 8	(16–13)	Staal 10	Golovec Hall, Celje; Attendance: 100; Referees: Backović, Palačković (SLO)
9 August 2019; 12:00	2× (yellow card) 4× (suspension)	Report	2× (yellow card) 3× (suspension)	Golovec Hall, Celje; Attendance: 100; Referees: Backović, Palačković (SLO)

9 August 2019; 14:30	Portugal	33–23	Spain	Golovec Hall, Celje; Attendance: 100; Referees: Kulović, Škaljić (BIH)
9 August 2019; 14:30	Sequiera 8	(20–10)	Benítez 6	Golovec Hall, Celje; Attendance: 100; Referees: Kulović, Škaljić (BIH)
9 August 2019; 14:30	3× (suspension)	Report	1× (yellow card) 1× (suspension)	Golovec Hall, Celje; Attendance: 100; Referees: Kulović, Škaljić (BIH)

=== 9–12th place semifinals ===
9 August 2019; 17:00	Slovakia	25–31	Montenegro	Golovec Hall, Celje; Attendance: 80; Referees: Loshak, Shajbakov (UKR)
9 August 2019; 17:00	Lancz 13	(8–10)	Zečević 8	Golovec Hall, Celje; Attendance: 80; Referees: Loshak, Shajbakov (UKR)
9 August 2019; 17:00	2× (yellow card) 3× (suspension)	Report	2× (yellow card) 5× (suspension)	Golovec Hall, Celje; Attendance: 80; Referees: Loshak, Shajbakov (UKR)

9 August 2019; 19:30	Slovenia	23–20	Romania	Golovec Hall, Celje; Attendance: 600; Referees: Mertinian, Syrepisios (GRE)
9 August 2019; 19:30	Novak 7	(11–10)	Gogîrlă 8	Golovec Hall, Celje; Attendance: 600; Referees: Mertinian, Syrepisios (GRE)
9 August 2019; 19:30	2× (yellow card) 4× (suspension)	Report	1× (yellow card) 1× (suspension)	Golovec Hall, Celje; Attendance: 600; Referees: Mertinian, Syrepisios (GRE)

=== 5–8th place semifinals ===
9 August 2019; 12:00	Norway	28–20	Germany	Zlatorog Arena, Celje; Attendance: 150; Referees: Stokes, Bartlett (GBR)
9 August 2019; 12:00	Alvestad 6	(14–14)	Meyer 6	Zlatorog Arena, Celje; Attendance: 150; Referees: Stokes, Bartlett (GBR)
9 August 2019; 12:00	1× (yellow card) 2× (suspension)	Report	4× (suspension)	Zlatorog Arena, Celje; Attendance: 150; Referees: Stokes, Bartlett (GBR)

9 August 2019; 14:30	Russia	36–33	Austria	Zlatorog Arena, Celje; Attendance: 150; Referees: Jakovljević, Sando (SRB)
9 August 2019; 14:30	Zakordonskaya 7	(17–15)	K. Pandza 11	Zlatorog Arena, Celje; Attendance: 150; Referees: Jakovljević, Sando (SRB)
9 August 2019; 14:30	3× (yellow card) 7× (suspension)	Report	1× (yellow card) 2× (suspension)	Zlatorog Arena, Celje; Attendance: 150; Referees: Jakovljević, Sando (SRB)

=== Semifinals ===
9 August 2019; 17:00	Hungary	25–21	Denmark	Zlatorog Arena, Celje; Attendance: 200; Referees: Lidacka, Lesiak (POL)
9 August 2019; 17:00	Farkas, Koronczai 6	(11–13)	Wierzba 6	Zlatorog Arena, Celje; Attendance: 200; Referees: Lidacka, Lesiak (POL)
9 August 2019; 17:00	1× (suspension)	Report	3× (yellow card) 1× (suspension)	Zlatorog Arena, Celje; Attendance: 200; Referees: Lidacka, Lesiak (POL)

9 August 2019; 19:30	France	19–20	Sweden	Zlatorog Arena, Celje; Attendance: 200; Referees: Ivanović, Vujisić (MNE)
9 August 2019; 19:30	Grandveau 6	(8–9)	Blohm 6	Zlatorog Arena, Celje; Attendance: 200; Referees: Ivanović, Vujisić (MNE)
9 August 2019; 19:30	2× (yellow card) 4× (suspension)	Report	2× (yellow card) 2× (suspension)	Zlatorog Arena, Celje; Attendance: 200; Referees: Ivanović, Vujisić (MNE)

=== 15th place game ===
10 August 2019; 12:00	Netherlands	31–27	Spain	Golovec Hall, Celje; Attendance: 200; Referees: Lindenbaum, Laron (ISR)
10 August 2019; 12:00	Wolfs 7	(13–13)	Benítez 5	Golovec Hall, Celje; Attendance: 200; Referees: Lindenbaum, Laron (ISR)
10 August 2019; 12:00	1× (yellow card) 4× (suspension)	Report	2× (yellow card) 2× (suspension)	Golovec Hall, Celje; Attendance: 200; Referees: Lindenbaum, Laron (ISR)

=== 13th place game ===
10 August 2019; 14:30	Croatia	29–30	Portugal	Golovec Hall, Celje; Attendance: 50; Referees: Ivanović, Vujisić (MNE)
10 August 2019; 14:30	Bilandžić 8	(13–19)	Costa, Unjanque 7	Golovec Hall, Celje; Attendance: 50; Referees: Ivanović, Vujisić (MNE)
10 August 2019; 14:30	1× (yellow card) 4× (suspension) 1× (red card)	Report	1× (yellow card) 3× (suspension)	Golovec Hall, Celje; Attendance: 50; Referees: Ivanović, Vujisić (MNE)

=== Eleventh place game ===
10 August 2019; 17:00	Slovakia	24–27	Romania	Golovec Hall, Celje; Attendance: 100; Referees: Kulović, Škaljić (BIH)
10 August 2019; 17:00	Lancz 8	(11–14)	Gogîrlă 16	Golovec Hall, Celje; Attendance: 100; Referees: Kulović, Škaljić (BIH)
10 August 2019; 17:00	1× (yellow card) 1× (suspension)	Report	1× (yellow card) 4× (suspension)	Golovec Hall, Celje; Attendance: 100; Referees: Kulović, Škaljić (BIH)

=== Ninth place game ===
10 August 2019
19:30
Montenegro
32–31 (ET)
Slovenia
Golovec Hall, Celje
Attendance: 400
Referees: Hannes, Hannes (GER)
A. Marsenić 7
(11–12)
Novak 8
1× (yellow card) 6× (suspension)
Report
2× (yellow card) 4× (suspension)

FT: 23–23 ET: 4–4, 2–2 Pen: 3–2

=== Seventh place game ===
10 August 2019; 14:30	Germany	32–22	Austria	Zlatorog Arena, Celje; Attendance: 150; Referees: Loshak, Shajbakov (UKR)
10 August 2019; 14:30	Rott 9	(14–11)	K. Pandza 11	Zlatorog Arena, Celje; Attendance: 150; Referees: Loshak, Shajbakov (UKR)
10 August 2019; 14:30	2× (yellow card) 3× (suspension)	Report	1× (yellow card) 3× (suspension)	Zlatorog Arena, Celje; Attendance: 150; Referees: Loshak, Shajbakov (UKR)

=== Fifth place game ===
10 August 2019; 17:00	Norway	26–35	Russia	Zlatorog Arena, Celje; Attendance: 150; Referees: Stokes, Bartlett (GBR)
10 August 2019; 17:00	Celius 8	(12–17)	Baeva, Zakordonskaya 8	Zlatorog Arena, Celje; Attendance: 150; Referees: Stokes, Bartlett (GBR)
10 August 2019; 17:00	1× (yellow card) 1× (suspension)	Report	2× (yellow card)	Zlatorog Arena, Celje; Attendance: 150; Referees: Stokes, Bartlett (GBR)

=== Third place game ===
11 August 2019; 12:00	Denmark	21–28	France	Zlatorog Arena, Celje; Attendance: 500; Referees: Jakovljević, Sando (SRB)
11 August 2019; 12:00	Rasmussen, Wierzba 4	(9–15)	Abadie 7	Zlatorog Arena, Celje; Attendance: 500; Referees: Jakovljević, Sando (SRB)
11 August 2019; 12:00	1× (yellow card) 4× (suspension)	Report	1× (yellow card) 2× (suspension)	Zlatorog Arena, Celje; Attendance: 500; Referees: Jakovljević, Sando (SRB)

=== Final ===
11 August 2019; 14:30	Hungary	28–24	Sweden	Zlatorog Arena, Celje; Attendance: 700; Referees: Backović, Palačković (SLO)
11 August 2019; 14:30	Koronczai 7	(13–9)	Stojilkovic 9	Zlatorog Arena, Celje; Attendance: 700; Referees: Backović, Palačković (SLO)
11 August 2019; 14:30	2× (yellow card) 3× (suspension)	Report	2× (yellow card) 2× (suspension)	Zlatorog Arena, Celje; Attendance: 700; Referees: Backović, Palačković (SLO)

== Final ranking ==
Qualified for the 2020 Women's Youth World Handball Championship
Relegated to the Women’s 17 EHF Championship 2021

Rank	Team
1st place, gold medalist(s)	Hungary
2nd place, silver medalist(s)	Sweden
3rd place, bronze medalist(s)	France
4	Denmark
5	Russia
6	Norway
7	Germany
8	Austria
9	Montenegro
10	Slovenia
11	Romania
12	Slovakia
13	Portugal
14	Croatia
15	Netherlands
16	Spain

== Tournament awards ==
The all-star team and awards were announced on 11 August 2019.

=== All-star team ===
Position	Player
Goalkeeper	(Sweden) Hanna Popaja
Right wing	(Hungary) Laura Kürthi
Right back	(Russia) Juliia Baeva
Centre back	(France) Léna Grandveau
Left back	(Sweden) Tyra Axnér
Left wing	(Denmark) Ida Trolle Handreck
Pivot	(France) Sarah Bouktit

=== Awards ===
Most valuable player	(Hungary) Blanka Kajdon
Top scorer	(Austria) Katarina Pandza
