= Katarina Džaferović =

Montenegrin handball player (born 2002)

Personal information
- Nationality: Montenegrin
- Born: 14 July 2002 (age 24) Podgorica, Montenegro, FR Yugoslavia
- Height: 1.82 m (6 ft 0 in)

Sport
- Sport: Handball
- Position: Right back
- Current club: ŽRK Budućnost Podgorica
- Number: 14

Youth career
- Years: Team
- 2016–2018: ŽRK Budućnost Podgorica

Senior clubs
- Years: Team
- 2018–2024: ŽRK Budućnost Podgorica
- 2024–: SCM Craiova
National team
| Years | Team | Apps | (Gls) |
| 2019– | Montenegro | 28 | (29) |

Katarina Džaferović (born 14 July 2002) is a Montenegrin handball player for ŽRK Budućnost Podgorica and the Montenegrin national team.

She was selected as part of the Montenegrin squad for the 2020 European Women's Handball Championship.

== Achievements ==
- Montenegrin Championship:
  - Winner: 2019, 2021, 2022
- Montenegrin Cup:
  - Winner: 2019, 2020, 2021
- Women's Regional Handball League:
  - Winner: 2019
