= Maria Ciulei =

Romanian handball coach

Maria Ciulei is a Romanian handball coach, who initiated and coached world-renowned handball players and led her teams to eleven national titles and two European titles. In 1989, she was ranked by the International Handball Federation among top ten handball coaches in Europe. She resides in Râmnicu Vâlcea, Romania.

== Coaching results ==
- 1982: National champion with CSS Făgăraș, Romania (girls, 16-17 years of age)
- 1984: Winners EHF Cup with CS Oltchim Râmnicu Vâlcea (with Professor Popescu Constantin) (1st League women)
- 1984: EHF Women's Champions Trophy with CS Oltchim Râmnicu Vâlcea, Chimistul Râmnicu Vâlcea (with Professor Ion Gerhard) (1st League women)
- 1989: National champion with CS Oltchim Râmnicu Vâlcea, Romania (girls, 18-19 years of age)
- 1995: National champion with CS Oltchim Râmnicu Vâlcea, Romania (girls, 18-19 years of age)
- 1996: Third Place national championship with CS Oltchim Râmnicu Vâlcea, Romania (girls, 14-15 years of age)
- 1997: National vice champion with CS Oltchim Râmnicu Vâlcea, Romania (girls, 16-17 years of age)
- 1998: National champion with CS Oltchim Râmnicu Vâlcea, Romania (girls, 18-19 years of age)
- 2000: National champion with CS Oltchim Râmnicu Vâlcea, Romania (girls, 14-15 years of age)
- 2002: National vice champion with CS Oltchim Râmnicu Vâlcea, Romania (girls, 16-17 years of age)
- 2009: National vice champion with HC Oltenia, Romania (girls, 12-13 years of age)
- 2011: National champion with AS 181 SSP Bucuresti, Romania (girls, 16-17 years of age), national vice champion with AS 181 SSP Bucuresti, Romania (girls, 14-15 years of age)
- 2014: National champion with HCM Török, Romania (girls, 8-12 years of age)

== Initiated and coached ==
- Liliana Topea:
  - European champion with Lutzenlinden, Germany (1990)
  - 3 times European champion with Hypobank Vienna (1991–1994) represented Austria at the 1994 Olympic Games
- Carmen Niţescu:
  - Rumanian youth and women's national team
  - Youth world champion (1995)
  - EHF vice champion with Gyor, Hungary (2004)
- Cristina Dogaru, Monica Iacob, Carcadia Florentina:
  - Rumanian youth and women's national team
- Roşca Isabela, Ilie Alina, Andrei Iulia, Bucă Oana
  - Gold medal at the IHF Women's Junior World Championship (2015)
- Mădălina Zamfirescu
  - 2016 European Women's Handball Championship
- Alina Ilie
  - Silver medal at the IHF Women's Youth World Championship (2016)
- Madalina Zamfirescu, Alina Ilie
  - Members of the Romania women's national handball team (2017)

== Coached ==
- Cristina Vărzaru, Oana Manea, Roxana Gatzel-Han, Adina Meiroşu, Aurelia Stoica, Steluța Luca
