= Anastasija Marsenić =

Montenegrin handball player (born 2003)

Personal information
- Full name: Anastasija Marsenić
- Nationality: Montenegrin/Danish
- Born: 24 February 2003 (age 23) Ballerup, Copenhagen, Denmark
- Height: 1.73 m (5 ft 8 in)

Sport
- Sport: Handball
- Position: Right wing
- Current club: København Håndbold
- Number: 28

Youth career
- Years: Team
- –: FIF
- –: Herlev/Hjorten Håndbold
- –: HIK
- 2018–2020: Virum-Sorgenfri HK

Senior clubs
- Years: Team
- 2020–2021: ŽRK Budućnost
- 2021–2023: Molde Elite
- 2023–2025: ŽRK Budućnost
- 2025–: København Håndbold
National team
| Years | Team | Apps | (Gls) |
| 2019- | Montenegro | 33 | (58) |
- Updated on 10 April 2024

Anastasija Marsenić (born 24 February 2003) is a Montenegrin/Danish handball player for København Håndbold and the Montenegrin national team. She was born in Denmark to Montenegrin parents.

== Career ==
She played youth handball at FIF, Herlev/Hjorten Håndbold nad HIK in and around Copenhagen.

In 2020 she joined Montenigrin side ŽRK Budućnost Podgorica. In 2021 she won the Montenegrin cup and Championship.

In 2021-22 she joined Norwegian Molde HK. Here she reached the final of the 2021 cup.

In 2023 she returned to ŽRK Budućnost Podgorica.

In 2025 she joined København Håndbold in the Danish top division.

=== National team ===
For the youth teams Marsenić played for both the Danish and Montenegrin youth national teams. In September 2019 she was selected for the Montenegrin national team for the first time by head coach Per Johansson for qualifications for the 2020 European Women's Handball Championship.

She was also selected as part of the Montenegrin 35-player squad for the 2020 European Women's Handball Championship.

At the 2023 World Women's Handball Championship she finished 7th with the Montenegrin team.

== Achievements ==
- Norwegian Cup:
  - Finalist: 2021
- Montenegrin League
  - Winner: 2021, 2024
- Montenegrin Cup
  - Winner: 2021, 2024
