= Ksenia Zakordonskaya =

Russian handball player

Personal information
- Full name: Ksenia Sergeevna Zakordonskaya
- Nationality: Russian
- Born: 3 April 2003 (age 23) Astrakhan, Russia
- Height: 1.74 m (5 ft 9 in)

Sport
- Sport: Handball
- Position: Line player
- Current club: HC Astrakhanochka
- Number: 14

Senior clubs
- Years: Team
- 2021-: HC Astrakhanochka
National team
Years	Team	Apps	(Gls)
2021–	Russia	0	(0)

Ksenia Sergeevna Zakordonskaya (Russian: Ксения Сергеевна Закордонская; born 3 April 2003) is a Russian female handballer for HC Astrakhanochka and the Russian national team.

She participated at the 2021 World Women's Handball Championship in Spain.
