= Barbora Lancz =

Slovak handball player (born 2002)

Personal information
- Nationality: Slovak
- Born: 28 July 2002 (age 24) Šaľa, Slovakia
- Height: 1.71 m (5 ft 7 in)

Sport
- Sport: Handball
- Position: Right back
- Current club: MTK Budapest
- Number: 28

Youth career
- Years: Team
- –2016: HK Slovan Duslo Šaľa
- 2016–2019: Győri ETO KC

Senior clubs
- Years: Team
- 2019–2025: Mosonmagyaróvári KC SE
- 2025–: MTK Budapest
National team
Years	Team	Apps	(Gls)
2019–	Slovakia	48	(245)

Barbora Lancz (born 28 July 2002) is a Slovak female handball player for Hungarian club MTK Budapest and the Slovak national team. In 2023 she was named Slovak Player of the Year.
