= 2014 Women's Junior World Handball Championship =

2014 Women's Junior World Championship

Tournament details
- Host country: Croatia
- Venue(s): 4 (in 4 host cities)
- Dates: 28 June–13 July
- Teams: 24 (from 4 confederations)

Final positions
- Champions: South Korea (1st title)
- Runner-up: Russia
- Third place: Denmark

Tournament statistics
- Matches played: 100
- Goals scored: 5,314 (53.14 per match)
- Top scorer(s): (South Korea) Lee Hyo-jin (64 goals)

Awards
- Best player: (South Korea) Lee Hyo-jin

The 2014 IHF Women's Junior World Championship was the 19th edition of the tournament and took place in Croatia from 28 June to 13 July 2014.

South Korea won the final and their first title by defeating Russia 34–27. Denmark secured the bronze medal after defeating Germany 21–20.

== Teams ==
Africa

- Angola
- Congo DR
- Tunisia

Americas

- Argentina
- Brazil
- Uruguay

Asia

- China
- Japan
- Kazakhstan
- South Korea

Europe

- Croatia
- Czech Republic
- Denmark
- France
- Germany
- Hungary
- Netherlands
- Norway
- Portugal
- Romania
- Russia
- Serbia
- Slovenia
- Sweden

Oceania

- No teams qualified

== Preliminary round ==
The schedule was published on 19 May.

All times are local (UTC+2).

=== Group A ===
Team	Pld	W	D	L	GF	GA	GD	Pts
South Korea	5	4	0	1	183	132	+51	8
Croatia	5	4	0	1	134	101	+33	8
Norway	5	3	0	2	165	116	+49	6
Czech Republic	5	3	0	2	141	124	+17	6
Uruguay	5	1	0	4	103	172	−69	2
Kazakhstan	5	0	0	5	103	184	−81	0

28 June 2014; 16:15	Norway	31–18	Czech Republic	Športska dvorana, Dugo Selo; Attendance: 100; Referees: Florescu, Stoia (ROU)
28 June 2014; 16:15	three players 4	(14–10)	Pokorná 6	Športska dvorana, Dugo Selo; Attendance: 100; Referees: Florescu, Stoia (ROU)
28 June 2014; 16:15	3× (yellow card) 2× (suspension)	Report	3× (yellow card) 3× (suspension)	Športska dvorana, Dugo Selo; Attendance: 100; Referees: Florescu, Stoia (ROU)

28 June 2014; 18:30	South Korea	48–26	Kazakhstan	Športska dvorana, Dugo Selo; Attendance: 1,000; Referees: Erdoğan, Özdeniz (TUR)
28 June 2014; 18:30	Yu So-jeong 12	(22–14)	Alexandrova 8	Športska dvorana, Dugo Selo; Attendance: 1,000; Referees: Erdoğan, Özdeniz (TUR)
28 June 2014; 18:30	3× (yellow card) 4× (suspension)	Report	2× (yellow card) 7× (suspension)	Športska dvorana, Dugo Selo; Attendance: 1,000; Referees: Erdoğan, Özdeniz (TUR)

28 June 2014; 20:45	Croatia	27–14	Uruguay	Športska dvorana, Dugo Selo; Attendance: 500; Referees: Al-Watani, Qamber (BHR)
28 June 2014; 20:45	Dežić 7	(10–11)	Barreiro 4	Športska dvorana, Dugo Selo; Attendance: 500; Referees: Al-Watani, Qamber (BHR)
28 June 2014; 20:45	3× (yellow card) 4× (suspension)	Report	4× (yellow card) 2× (suspension) 1× (red card)	Športska dvorana, Dugo Selo; Attendance: 500; Referees: Al-Watani, Qamber (BHR)

30 June 2014; 16:00	Czech Republic	30–27	South Korea	Športska dvorana, Dugo Selo; Attendance: 50; Referees: Bethmann, Tzaferopoulos (GRE)
30 June 2014; 16:00	Malá 6	(11–12)	Won Seon-pil 7	Športska dvorana, Dugo Selo; Attendance: 50; Referees: Bethmann, Tzaferopoulos (GRE)
30 June 2014; 16:00	3× (yellow card) 4× (suspension)	Report	3× (yellow card) 5× (suspension)	Športska dvorana, Dugo Selo; Attendance: 50; Referees: Bethmann, Tzaferopoulos (GRE)

30 June 2014; 18:15	Uruguay	20–45	Norway	Športska dvorana, Dugo Selo; Attendance: 100; Referees: Li, Wang (CHN)
30 June 2014; 18:15	Barreiro 9	(13–24)	Venn 9	Športska dvorana, Dugo Selo; Attendance: 100; Referees: Li, Wang (CHN)
30 June 2014; 18:15	3× (yellow card)	Report	3× (yellow card) 4× (suspension)	Športska dvorana, Dugo Selo; Attendance: 100; Referees: Li, Wang (CHN)

30 June 2014; 20:30	Kazakhstan	17–32	Croatia	Športska dvorana, Dugo Selo; Attendance: 350; Referees: Boualloucha, Khenissi (TUN)
30 June 2014; 20:30	Alexandrova, Kapralova 6	(7–19)	Mamić, Mičijević 5	Športska dvorana, Dugo Selo; Attendance: 350; Referees: Boualloucha, Khenissi (TUN)
30 June 2014; 20:30	3× (yellow card) 3× (suspension)	Report	3× (yellow card) 1× (suspension)	Športska dvorana, Dugo Selo; Attendance: 350; Referees: Boualloucha, Khenissi (TUN)

2 July 2014; 16:00	Norway	42–19	Kazakhstan	Športska dvorana, Dugo Selo; Attendance: 100; Referees: Bethmann, Tzaferopoulos (GRE)
2 July 2014; 16:00	Arntzen, Venn 7	(21–9)	Alexandrova 9	Športska dvorana, Dugo Selo; Attendance: 100; Referees: Bethmann, Tzaferopoulos (GRE)
2 July 2014; 16:00	3× (yellow card) 1× (suspension)	Report	3× (yellow card) 7× (suspension)	Športska dvorana, Dugo Selo; Attendance: 100; Referees: Bethmann, Tzaferopoulos (GRE)

2 July 2014; 18:15	South Korea	29–27	Croatia	Športska dvorana, Dugo Selo; Attendance: 500; Referees: Volodkov, Zotin (RUS)
2 July 2014; 18:15	three players 5	(11–9)	Mamić 5	Športska dvorana, Dugo Selo; Attendance: 500; Referees: Volodkov, Zotin (RUS)
2 July 2014; 18:15	3× (yellow card) 7× (suspension)	Report	3× (yellow card) 5× (suspension)	Športska dvorana, Dugo Selo; Attendance: 500; Referees: Volodkov, Zotin (RUS)

2 July 2014; 20:30	Czech Republic	33–24	Uruguay	Športska dvorana, Dugo Selo; Attendance: 100; Referees: Erdoğan, Özdeniz (TUR)
2 July 2014; 20:30	Malá 8	(14–11)	Barreiro 10	Športska dvorana, Dugo Selo; Attendance: 100; Referees: Erdoğan, Özdeniz (TUR)
2 July 2014; 20:30	2× (yellow card) 5× (suspension)	Report	3× (yellow card) 3× (suspension)	Športska dvorana, Dugo Selo; Attendance: 100; Referees: Erdoğan, Özdeniz (TUR)

3 July 2014; 16:00	South Korea	45–22	Uruguay	Športska dvorana, Dugo Selo; Attendance: 100; Referees: Florescu, Stoia (ROU)
3 July 2014; 16:00	Lee Hyo-jin, Hur You-jin 6	(25–11)	Barreiro 9	Športska dvorana, Dugo Selo; Attendance: 100; Referees: Florescu, Stoia (ROU)
3 July 2014; 16:00	3× (yellow card) 3× (suspension)	Report	4× (yellow card) 2× (suspension)	Športska dvorana, Dugo Selo; Attendance: 100; Referees: Florescu, Stoia (ROU)

3 July 2014; 18:15	Croatia	25–20	Norway	Športska dvorana, Dugo Selo; Attendance: 500; Referees: Andorka, Hucker (HUN)
3 July 2014; 18:15	Dežić, Mičijević 6	(14–14)	Arntzen 5	Športska dvorana, Dugo Selo; Attendance: 500; Referees: Andorka, Hucker (HUN)
3 July 2014; 18:15	1× (yellow card) 2× (suspension)	Report	3× (yellow card) 2× (suspension)	Športska dvorana, Dugo Selo; Attendance: 500; Referees: Andorka, Hucker (HUN)

3 July 2014; 20:30	Kazakhstan	19–39	Czech Republic	Športska dvorana, Dugo Selo; Referees: Li, Wang (CHN)
3 July 2014; 20:30	Alexandrova 5	(6–19)	Šelaisová 6	Športska dvorana, Dugo Selo; Referees: Li, Wang (CHN)
3 July 2014; 20:30	4× (yellow card) 4× (suspension)	Report	3× (yellow card) 2× (suspension)	Športska dvorana, Dugo Selo; Referees: Li, Wang (CHN)

5 July 2014; 16:15	Uruguay	23–22	Kazakhstan	Športska dvorana, Dugo Selo; Attendance: 30; Referees: Al-Watani, Qamber (BHR)
5 July 2014; 16:15	Barreiro 10	(13–13)	Alexandrova 10	Športska dvorana, Dugo Selo; Attendance: 30; Referees: Al-Watani, Qamber (BHR)
5 July 2014; 16:15	2× (yellow card) 2× (suspension)	Report	3× (yellow card) 4× (suspension)	Športska dvorana, Dugo Selo; Attendance: 30; Referees: Al-Watani, Qamber (BHR)

5 July 2014; 18:30	Croatia	23–21	Czech Republic	Športska dvorana, Dugo Selo; Attendance: 450; Referees: Florescu, Stoia (ROU)
5 July 2014; 18:30	Dežić 5	(12–14)	Fryčáková, Malá 4	Športska dvorana, Dugo Selo; Attendance: 450; Referees: Florescu, Stoia (ROU)
5 July 2014; 18:30	3× (yellow card) 4× (suspension)	Report	3× (yellow card) 8× (suspension)	Športska dvorana, Dugo Selo; Attendance: 450; Referees: Florescu, Stoia (ROU)

5 July 2014; 20:45	Norway	27–34	South Korea	Športska dvorana, Dugo Selo; Attendance: 200; Referees: Boualloucha, Khenissi (TUN)
5 July 2014; 20:45	Oftedal 8	(12–16)	Lee Hyo-jin 13	Športska dvorana, Dugo Selo; Attendance: 200; Referees: Boualloucha, Khenissi (TUN)
5 July 2014; 20:45	4× (yellow card) 3× (suspension)	Report	4× (yellow card) 4× (suspension)	Športska dvorana, Dugo Selo; Attendance: 200; Referees: Boualloucha, Khenissi (TUN)

=== Group B ===
Team	Pld	W	D	L	GF	GA	GD	Pts
Denmark	5	5	0	0	147	113	+34	10
Germany	5	4	0	1	145	112	+33	8
Netherlands	5	3	0	2	130	131	−1	6
Serbia	5	2	0	3	127	144	−17	4
Argentina	5	1	0	4	117	141	−24	2
Angola	5	0	0	5	135	160	−25	0

28 June 2014; 16:15	Denmark	34–30	Angola	Dom Sportova, Zagreb; Attendance: 100; Referees: Bethmann, Tzaferopoulos (GRE)
28 June 2014; 16:15	Tranborg 8	(15–12)	Kassoma 9	Dom Sportova, Zagreb; Attendance: 100; Referees: Bethmann, Tzaferopoulos (GRE)
28 June 2014; 16:15	3× (yellow card) 5× (suspension)	Report	3× (yellow card) 4× (suspension)	Dom Sportova, Zagreb; Attendance: 100; Referees: Bethmann, Tzaferopoulos (GRE)

28 June 2014; 18:30	Netherlands	25–23	Argentina	Dom Sportova, Zagreb; Attendance: 100; Referees: Li, Wang (CHN)
28 June 2014; 18:30	five players 3	(16–13)	Karsten 7	Dom Sportova, Zagreb; Attendance: 100; Referees: Li, Wang (CHN)
28 June 2014; 18:30	3× (yellow card) 6× (suspension)	Report	1× (yellow card) 2× (suspension)	Dom Sportova, Zagreb; Attendance: 100; Referees: Li, Wang (CHN)

28 June 2014; 20:45	Germany	26–20	Serbia	Dom Sportova, Zagreb; Attendance: 120; Referees: Volodkov, Zotin (RUS)
28 June 2014; 20:45	Smits 10	(16–10)	Radosavljević 6	Dom Sportova, Zagreb; Attendance: 120; Referees: Volodkov, Zotin (RUS)
28 June 2014; 20:45	3× (yellow card) 7× (suspension)	Report	4× (yellow card) 7× (suspension)	Dom Sportova, Zagreb; Attendance: 120; Referees: Volodkov, Zotin (RUS)

30 June 2014; 16:00	Angola	32–35	Netherlands	Dom Sportova, Zagreb; Attendance: 130; Referees: Erdoğan, Özdeniz (TUR)
30 June 2014; 16:00	Nenganga 7	(16–20)	Smits 8	Dom Sportova, Zagreb; Attendance: 130; Referees: Erdoğan, Özdeniz (TUR)
30 June 2014; 16:00	4× (yellow card) 4× (suspension)	Report	4× (yellow card) 6× (suspension)	Dom Sportova, Zagreb; Attendance: 130; Referees: Erdoğan, Özdeniz (TUR)

30 June 2014; 18:15	Serbia	22–36	Denmark	Dom Sportova, Zagreb; Attendance: 150; Referees: Andorka, Hucker (HUN)
30 June 2014; 18:15	Janjusević 7	(12–17)	Offendal 9	Dom Sportova, Zagreb; Attendance: 150; Referees: Andorka, Hucker (HUN)
30 June 2014; 18:15	4× (yellow card) 3× (suspension)	Report	2× (yellow card) 3× (suspension)	Dom Sportova, Zagreb; Attendance: 150; Referees: Andorka, Hucker (HUN)

30 June 2014; 20:30	Argentina	19–36	Germany	Dom Sportova, Zagreb; Attendance: 100; Referees: Florescu, Stoia (ROU)
30 June 2014; 20:30	Karsten 6	(10–17)	Rode 6	Dom Sportova, Zagreb; Attendance: 100; Referees: Florescu, Stoia (ROU)
30 June 2014; 20:30	2× (yellow card) 1× (suspension)	Report	3× (yellow card) 2× (suspension)	Dom Sportova, Zagreb; Attendance: 100; Referees: Florescu, Stoia (ROU)

2 July 2014; 16:00	Denmark	27–21	Argentina	Dom Sportova, Zagreb; Attendance: 50; Referees: Boualloucha, Khenissi (TUN)
2 July 2014; 16:00	Offendal 6	(16–11)	Karsten 6	Dom Sportova, Zagreb; Attendance: 50; Referees: Boualloucha, Khenissi (TUN)
2 July 2014; 16:00	3× (yellow card)	Report	3× (yellow card)	Dom Sportova, Zagreb; Attendance: 50; Referees: Boualloucha, Khenissi (TUN)

2 July 2014; 18:15	Netherlands	22–24	Germany	Dom Sportova, Zagreb; Attendance: 150; Referees: Andorka, Hucker (HUN)
2 July 2014; 18:15	Dulfer, Steenbakkers 4	(13–12)	Smits 6	Dom Sportova, Zagreb; Attendance: 150; Referees: Andorka, Hucker (HUN)
2 July 2014; 18:15	2× (yellow card) 3× (suspension)	Report	2× (yellow card) 2× (suspension)	Dom Sportova, Zagreb; Attendance: 150; Referees: Andorka, Hucker (HUN)

2 July 2014; 20:30	Angola	24–28	Serbia	Dom Sportova, Zagreb; Attendance: 50; Referees: Al-Watani, Qamber (BHR)
2 July 2014; 20:30	Machado 9	(14–14)	Radović 7	Dom Sportova, Zagreb; Attendance: 50; Referees: Al-Watani, Qamber (BHR)
2 July 2014; 20:30	3× (yellow card) 11× (suspension) 1× (red card)	Report	4× (yellow card) 8× (suspension)	Dom Sportova, Zagreb; Attendance: 50; Referees: Al-Watani, Qamber (BHR)

3 July 2014; 16:00	Netherlands	33–28	Serbia	Dom Sportova, Zagreb; Attendance: 70; Referees: Boualloucha, Khenissi (TUN)
3 July 2014; 16:00	Dulfer 7	(15–16)	Janjusević 7	Dom Sportova, Zagreb; Attendance: 70; Referees: Boualloucha, Khenissi (TUN)
3 July 2014; 16:00	3× (yellow card) 3× (suspension)	Report	3× (yellow card) 1× (suspension)	Dom Sportova, Zagreb; Attendance: 70; Referees: Boualloucha, Khenissi (TUN)

3 July 2014; 18:15	Germany	25–26	Denmark	Dom Sportova, Zagreb; Attendance: 70; Referees: Erdoğan, Özdeniz (TUR)
3 July 2014; 18:15	Rode 9	(13–12)	Tranborg 6	Dom Sportova, Zagreb; Attendance: 70; Referees: Erdoğan, Özdeniz (TUR)
3 July 2014; 18:15	3× (yellow card) 3× (suspension)	Report	2× (yellow card) 2× (suspension)	Dom Sportova, Zagreb; Attendance: 70; Referees: Erdoğan, Özdeniz (TUR)

3 July 2014; 20:30	Argentina	29–24	Angola	Dom Sportova, Zagreb; Attendance: 40; Referees: Volodkov, Zotin (RUS)
3 July 2014; 20:30	Karsten 16	(18–13)	three players 4	Dom Sportova, Zagreb; Attendance: 40; Referees: Volodkov, Zotin (RUS)
3 July 2014; 20:30	3× (yellow card) 2× (suspension)	Report	3× (yellow card) 6× (suspension)	Dom Sportova, Zagreb; Attendance: 40; Referees: Volodkov, Zotin (RUS)

5 July 2014; 16:15	Serbia	29–25	Argentina	Dom Sportova, Zagreb; Attendance: 50; Referees: Andorka, Hucker (HUN)
5 July 2014; 16:15	Janjusević 11	(18–12)	Karsten 9	Dom Sportova, Zagreb; Attendance: 50; Referees: Andorka, Hucker (HUN)
5 July 2014; 16:15	3× (yellow card) 7× (suspension)	Report	2× (yellow card)	Dom Sportova, Zagreb; Attendance: 50; Referees: Andorka, Hucker (HUN)

5 July 2014; 18:30	Germany	34–25	Angola	Dom Sportova, Zagreb; Attendance: 100; Referees: Bethmann, Tzaferopoulos (GRE)
5 July 2014; 18:30	Smits, Rode 7	(16–14)	Machado 10	Dom Sportova, Zagreb; Attendance: 100; Referees: Bethmann, Tzaferopoulos (GRE)
5 July 2014; 18:30	3× (yellow card) 6× (suspension)	Report	3× (yellow card) 5× (suspension)	Dom Sportova, Zagreb; Attendance: 100; Referees: Bethmann, Tzaferopoulos (GRE)

5 July 2014; 20:45	Denmark	24–15	Netherlands	Dom Sportova, Zagreb; Attendance: 165; Referees: Volodkov, Zotin (RUS)
5 July 2014; 20:45	Larsen, Haugsted 4	(11–9)	Smits, Vollebregt 3	Dom Sportova, Zagreb; Attendance: 165; Referees: Volodkov, Zotin (RUS)
5 July 2014; 20:45	3× (yellow card) 2× (suspension)	Report	3× (yellow card) 5× (suspension)	Dom Sportova, Zagreb; Attendance: 165; Referees: Volodkov, Zotin (RUS)

=== Group C ===
Team	Pld	W	D	L	GF	GA	GD	Pts
Hungary	5	5	0	0	136	82	+54	10
France	5	4	0	1	133	100	+33	8
Portugal	5	3	0	2	121	119	+2	6
Sweden	5	1	1	3	111	112	−1	3
Japan	5	1	1	3	125	157	−32	3
Congo DR	5	0	0	5	90	146	−56	0

28 June 2014; 16:15	Hungary	37–19	Japan	Fran Galović, Koprivnica; Attendance: 100; Referees: Arntsen, Røen (NOR)
28 June 2014; 16:15	Korsós, Tóth 7	(20–10)	Sasaki 6	Fran Galović, Koprivnica; Attendance: 100; Referees: Arntsen, Røen (NOR)
28 June 2014; 16:15	2× (yellow card) 3× (suspension)	Report	2× (yellow card) 1× (suspension)	Fran Galović, Koprivnica; Attendance: 100; Referees: Arntsen, Røen (NOR)

28 June 2014; 18:30	France	29–16	Portugal	Fran Galović, Koprivnica; Attendance: 250; Referees: Lenci, Grillo (ARG)
28 June 2014; 18:30	four players 3	(12–7)	Gante 6	Fran Galović, Koprivnica; Attendance: 250; Referees: Lenci, Grillo (ARG)
28 June 2014; 18:30	3× (yellow card) 6× (suspension)	Report	4× (yellow card) 3× (suspension)	Fran Galović, Koprivnica; Attendance: 250; Referees: Lenci, Grillo (ARG)

28 June 2014; 20:45	Sweden	23–15	Congo DR	Fran Galović, Koprivnica; Attendance: 200; Referees: Antić, Jakovljević (SRB)
28 June 2014; 20:45	Gustin 5	(12–7)	Tshela 6	Fran Galović, Koprivnica; Attendance: 200; Referees: Antić, Jakovljević (SRB)
28 June 2014; 20:45	3× (yellow card) 2× (suspension)	Report	2× (yellow card) 4× (suspension) 1× (red card)	Fran Galović, Koprivnica; Attendance: 200; Referees: Antić, Jakovljević (SRB)

29 June 2014; 16:00	Japan	22–33	France	Fran Galović, Koprivnica; Attendance: 200; Referees: Antić, Jakovljević (SRB)
29 June 2014; 16:00	Sasaki 10	(9–16)	Frecon, Flippes 6	Fran Galović, Koprivnica; Attendance: 200; Referees: Antić, Jakovljević (SRB)
29 June 2014; 16:00	3× (yellow card) 1× (suspension)	Report	3× (yellow card) 3× (suspension)	Fran Galović, Koprivnica; Attendance: 200; Referees: Antić, Jakovljević (SRB)

29 June 2014; 18:15	Congo DR	9–35	Hungary	Fran Galović, Koprivnica; Attendance: 200; Referees: Gonzales, Prieto (URU)
29 June 2014; 18:15	Tshela 3	(6–13)	Virág, Korsós 6	Fran Galović, Koprivnica; Attendance: 200; Referees: Gonzales, Prieto (URU)
29 June 2014; 18:15	3× (yellow card) 5× (suspension) 1× (red card)	Report	3× (yellow card) 6× (suspension) 1× (red card)	Fran Galović, Koprivnica; Attendance: 200; Referees: Gonzales, Prieto (URU)

29 June 2014; 20:30	Portugal	22–19	Sweden	Fran Galović, Koprivnica; Attendance: 200; Referees: El-Sayed, Rashed (EGY)
29 June 2014; 20:30	Soares 7	(14–9)	Massing, Sundberg 4	Fran Galović, Koprivnica; Attendance: 200; Referees: El-Sayed, Rashed (EGY)
29 June 2014; 20:30	4× (yellow card) 8× (suspension)	Report	4× (yellow card) 2× (suspension)	Fran Galović, Koprivnica; Attendance: 200; Referees: El-Sayed, Rashed (EGY)

1 July 2014; 16:00	Hungary	21–20	Portugal	Fran Galović, Koprivnica; Attendance: 200; Referees: Akpatsa, Assignon (TOG)
1 July 2014; 16:00	Tóth 6	(12–11)	Soares 8	Fran Galović, Koprivnica; Attendance: 200; Referees: Akpatsa, Assignon (TOG)
1 July 2014; 16:00	2× (yellow card) 7× (suspension) 1× (red card)	Report	3× (yellow card) 7× (suspension)	Fran Galović, Koprivnica; Attendance: 200; Referees: Akpatsa, Assignon (TOG)

1 July 2014; 18:15	France	28–23	Sweden	Fran Galović, Koprivnica; Attendance: 300; Referees: Koo, Lee (KOR)
1 July 2014; 18:15	Prouvensier 6	(12–9)	Massing, Ahlen 6	Fran Galović, Koprivnica; Attendance: 300; Referees: Koo, Lee (KOR)
1 July 2014; 18:15	3× (yellow card) 2× (suspension)	Report	3× (yellow card) 6× (suspension)	Fran Galović, Koprivnica; Attendance: 300; Referees: Koo, Lee (KOR)

1 July 2014; 20:30	Japan	30–27	Congo DR	Fran Galović, Koprivnica; Attendance: 100; Referees: El-Sayed, Rashed (EGY)
1 July 2014; 20:30	Sasaki 7	(16–10)	Betu 10	Fran Galović, Koprivnica; Attendance: 100; Referees: El-Sayed, Rashed (EGY)
1 July 2014; 20:30	3× (yellow card) 5× (suspension)	Report	2× (yellow card) 5× (suspension)	Fran Galović, Koprivnica; Attendance: 100; Referees: El-Sayed, Rashed (EGY)

3 July 2014; 16:00	France	29–17	Congo DR	Fran Galović, Koprivnica; Attendance: 100; Referees: Akpatsa, Assignon (TOG)
3 July 2014; 16:00	Bouquet 5	(14–8)	Tshela 5	Fran Galović, Koprivnica; Attendance: 100; Referees: Akpatsa, Assignon (TOG)
3 July 2014; 16:00	3× (yellow card)	Report	2× (yellow card) 2× (suspension)	Fran Galović, Koprivnica; Attendance: 100; Referees: Akpatsa, Assignon (TOG)

3 July 2014; 18:15	Sweden	20–21	Hungary	Fran Galović, Koprivnica; Attendance: 350; Referees: Grillo, Lenci (ARG)
3 July 2014; 18:15	Nilsson, Sundberg 4	(12–10)	Korsós, Walfisch 5	Fran Galović, Koprivnica; Attendance: 350; Referees: Grillo, Lenci (ARG)
3 July 2014; 18:15	3× (yellow card) 3× (suspension)	Report	3× (yellow card) 5× (suspension)	Fran Galović, Koprivnica; Attendance: 350; Referees: Grillo, Lenci (ARG)

3 July 2014; 20:30	Portugal	34–28	Japan	Fran Galović, Koprivnica; Attendance: 200; Referees: Antić, Jakovljević (SRB)
3 July 2014; 20:30	Soares 9	(21–15)	Tamura 9	Fran Galović, Koprivnica; Attendance: 200; Referees: Antić, Jakovljević (SRB)
3 July 2014; 20:30	2× (yellow card) 5× (suspension)	Report	2× (yellow card) 7× (suspension)	Fran Galović, Koprivnica; Attendance: 200; Referees: Antić, Jakovljević (SRB)

5 July 2014; 16:15	Congo DR	22–29	Portugal	Fran Galović, Koprivnica; Attendance: 150; Referees: Grillo, Lenci (ARG)
5 July 2014; 16:15	Benzuka, Bambi 5	(12–15)	Rodrigues 5	Fran Galović, Koprivnica; Attendance: 150; Referees: Grillo, Lenci (ARG)
5 July 2014; 16:15	1× (yellow card) 4× (suspension)	Report	3× (yellow card) 1× (suspension)	Fran Galović, Koprivnica; Attendance: 150; Referees: Grillo, Lenci (ARG)

5 July 2014; 18:30	Sweden	26–26	Japan	Fran Galović, Koprivnica; Attendance: 150; Referees: Koo, Lee (KOR)
5 July 2014; 18:30	Gustin, Eriksson 5	(9–16)	Sasaki 12	Fran Galović, Koprivnica; Attendance: 150; Referees: Koo, Lee (KOR)
5 July 2014; 18:30	3× (yellow card) 3× (suspension)	Report	2× (yellow card) 3× (suspension)	Fran Galović, Koprivnica; Attendance: 150; Referees: Koo, Lee (KOR)

5 July 2014; 20:45	Hungary	22–14	France	Fran Galović, Koprivnica; Attendance: 350; Referees: Arntsen, Røen (NOR)
5 July 2014; 20:45	Tóth 5	(13–6)	Kpodar 5	Fran Galović, Koprivnica; Attendance: 350; Referees: Arntsen, Røen (NOR)
5 July 2014; 20:45	2× (yellow card) 4× (suspension)	Report	2× (yellow card) 3× (suspension)	Fran Galović, Koprivnica; Attendance: 350; Referees: Arntsen, Røen (NOR)

=== Group D ===
Team	Pld	W	D	L	GF	GA	GD	Pts
Russia	5	5	0	0	180	115	+65	10
Romania	5	4	0	1	161	126	+35	8
Brazil	5	3	0	2	116	119	−3	6
Slovenia	5	2	0	3	134	137	−3	4
China	5	1	0	4	104	149	−45	2
Tunisia	5	0	0	5	114	163	−49	0

28 June 2014; 16:15	Russia	35–19	Brazil	Graditeljska škola Čakovec, Čakovec; Attendance: 100; Referees: Leszczynski, Piechota (POL)
28 June 2014; 16:15	Kozhokar 6	(13–10)	Pessoa 7	Graditeljska škola Čakovec, Čakovec; Attendance: 100; Referees: Leszczynski, Piechota (POL)
28 June 2014; 16:15	4× (yellow card) 4× (suspension)	Report	3× (yellow card) 2× (suspension)	Graditeljska škola Čakovec, Čakovec; Attendance: 100; Referees: Leszczynski, Piechota (POL)

28 June 2014; 18:30	Romania	35–22	Tunisia	Graditeljska škola Čakovec, Čakovec; Referees: Gonzales, Prieto (URU)
28 June 2014; 18:30	four players 5	(20–8)	Hamrouni 6	Graditeljska škola Čakovec, Čakovec; Referees: Gonzales, Prieto (URU)
28 June 2014; 18:30	3× (yellow card) 4× (suspension)	Report	2× (yellow card) 5× (suspension)	Graditeljska škola Čakovec, Čakovec; Referees: Gonzales, Prieto (URU)

28 June 2014; 20:45	Slovenia	29–23	China	Graditeljska škola Čakovec, Čakovec; Attendance: 200; Referees: El-Sayed, Rashed (EGY)
28 June 2014; 20:45	Leski 7	(13–11)	Jin Mengqing 10	Graditeljska škola Čakovec, Čakovec; Attendance: 200; Referees: El-Sayed, Rashed (EGY)
28 June 2014; 20:45	4× (yellow card) 8× (suspension)	Report	3× (yellow card) 5× (suspension)	Graditeljska škola Čakovec, Čakovec; Attendance: 200; Referees: El-Sayed, Rashed (EGY)

29 June 2014; 16:00	Brazil	21–26	Romania	Graditeljska škola Čakovec, Čakovec; Attendance: 200; Referees: Koo, Lee (KOR)
29 June 2014; 16:00	Pessoa 7	(11–14)	Tiron 6	Graditeljska škola Čakovec, Čakovec; Attendance: 200; Referees: Koo, Lee (KOR)
29 June 2014; 16:00	3× (yellow card) 2× (suspension)	Report	3× (yellow card) 2× (suspension)	Graditeljska škola Čakovec, Čakovec; Attendance: 200; Referees: Koo, Lee (KOR)

29 June 2014; 18:15	China	20–32	Russia	Graditeljska škola Čakovec, Čakovec; Referees: Akpatsa, Assignon (TOG)
29 June 2014; 18:15	Zahng Haixia 5	(12–15)	Pavlova 6	Graditeljska škola Čakovec, Čakovec; Referees: Akpatsa, Assignon (TOG)
29 June 2014; 18:15	3× (yellow card) 2× (suspension)	Report	3× (yellow card) 3× (suspension) 1× (red card)	Graditeljska škola Čakovec, Čakovec; Referees: Akpatsa, Assignon (TOG)

29 June 2014; 20:30	Tunisia	26–33	Slovenia	Graditeljska škola Čakovec, Čakovec; Attendance: 200; Referees: Arntsen, Røen (NOR)
29 June 2014; 20:30	Hachana 10	(13–19)	Jagurdzija 5	Graditeljska škola Čakovec, Čakovec; Attendance: 200; Referees: Arntsen, Røen (NOR)
29 June 2014; 20:30	2× (yellow card) 3× (suspension)	Report	2× (yellow card) 4× (suspension)	Graditeljska škola Čakovec, Čakovec; Attendance: 200; Referees: Arntsen, Røen (NOR)

1 July 2014; 16:00	Russia	43–18	Tunisia	Graditeljska škola Čakovec, Čakovec; Attendance: 100; Referees: Grillo, Lenci (ARG)
1 July 2014; 16:00	Khrapova 7	(23–9)	Hamrouni 4	Graditeljska škola Čakovec, Čakovec; Attendance: 100; Referees: Grillo, Lenci (ARG)
1 July 2014; 16:00	3× (yellow card) 1× (suspension)	Report	3× (yellow card)	Graditeljska škola Čakovec, Čakovec; Attendance: 100; Referees: Grillo, Lenci (ARG)

1 July 2014; 18:15	Romania	30–24	Slovenia	Graditeljska škola Čakovec, Čakovec; Attendance: 200; Referees: Leszczynski, Piechota (POL)
1 July 2014; 18:15	Constantinescu 10	(10–14)	Stanko 9	Graditeljska škola Čakovec, Čakovec; Attendance: 200; Referees: Leszczynski, Piechota (POL)
1 July 2014; 18:15	3× (yellow card) 2× (suspension)	Report	3× (yellow card) 3× (suspension)	Graditeljska škola Čakovec, Čakovec; Attendance: 200; Referees: Leszczynski, Piechota (POL)

1 July 2014; 20:30	Brazil	26–12	China	Graditeljska škola Čakovec, Čakovec; Attendance: 150; Referees: Antić, Jakovljević (SRB)
1 July 2014; 20:30	Lima de Araujo 6	(16–5)	Zhang Haixia 5	Graditeljska škola Čakovec, Čakovec; Attendance: 150; Referees: Antić, Jakovljević (SRB)
1 July 2014; 20:30	3× (yellow card)	Report	3× (yellow card) 3× (suspension)	Graditeljska škola Čakovec, Čakovec; Attendance: 150; Referees: Antić, Jakovljević (SRB)

3 July 2014; 16:00	Romania	39–25	China	Graditeljska škola Čakovec, Čakovec; Attendance: 100; Referees: Arntsen, Røen (NOR)
3 July 2014; 16:00	Tiron 9	(19–12)	Tian Xiuxiu, Jin Mengqing 5	Graditeljska škola Čakovec, Čakovec; Attendance: 100; Referees: Arntsen, Røen (NOR)
3 July 2014; 16:00	2× (yellow card) 3× (suspension)	Report	3× (yellow card) 2× (suspension)	Graditeljska škola Čakovec, Čakovec; Attendance: 100; Referees: Arntsen, Røen (NOR)

3 July 2014; 18:15	Slovenia	27–36	Russia	Graditeljska škola Čakovec, Čakovec; Attendance: 250; Referees: Gonzales, Prieto (URU)
3 July 2014; 18:15	Stanko 6	(15–20)	Dmitrieva 7	Graditeljska škola Čakovec, Čakovec; Attendance: 250; Referees: Gonzales, Prieto (URU)
3 July 2014; 18:15	3× (yellow card) 4× (suspension)	Report	3× (yellow card) 2× (suspension)	Graditeljska škola Čakovec, Čakovec; Attendance: 250; Referees: Gonzales, Prieto (URU)

3 July 2014; 20:30	Tunisia	25–28	Brazil	Graditeljska škola Čakovec, Čakovec; Attendance: 100; Referees: Leszczynski, Piechota (POL)
3 July 2014; 20:30	Rejeb, Farhani 5	(9–16)	Pessoa 8	Graditeljska škola Čakovec, Čakovec; Attendance: 100; Referees: Leszczynski, Piechota (POL)
3 July 2014; 20:30	4× (yellow card) 6× (suspension)	Report	2× (yellow card) 4× (suspension)	Graditeljska škola Čakovec, Čakovec; Attendance: 100; Referees: Leszczynski, Piechota (POL)

5 July 2014; 16:15	China	24–23	Tunisia	Graditeljska škola Čakovec, Čakovec; Attendance: 100; Referees: Gonzales, Prieto (URU)
5 July 2014; 16:15	Jin Mengqing 5	(11–10)	Hamrouni 8	Graditeljska škola Čakovec, Čakovec; Attendance: 100; Referees: Gonzales, Prieto (URU)
5 July 2014; 16:15	3× (yellow card) 4× (suspension)	Report	4× (yellow card) 4× (suspension)	Graditeljska škola Čakovec, Čakovec; Attendance: 100; Referees: Gonzales, Prieto (URU)

5 July 2014; 18:30	Slovenia	21–22	Brazil	Graditeljska škola Čakovec, Čakovec; Attendance: 200; Referees: El-Sayed, Rashed (EGY)
5 July 2014; 18:30	Jagurdzija, Ugrin 4	(12–9)	Pessoa 7	Graditeljska škola Čakovec, Čakovec; Attendance: 200; Referees: El-Sayed, Rashed (EGY)
5 July 2014; 18:30	3× (yellow card) 6× (suspension)	Report	2× (yellow card) 3× (suspension)	Graditeljska škola Čakovec, Čakovec; Attendance: 200; Referees: El-Sayed, Rashed (EGY)

5 July 2014; 20:45	Russia	34–31	Romania	Graditeljska škola Čakovec, Čakovec; Attendance: 300; Referees: Leszczynski, Piechota (POL)
5 July 2014; 20:45	Vyakhireva 7	(18–14)	Pricopi 8	Graditeljska škola Čakovec, Čakovec; Attendance: 300; Referees: Leszczynski, Piechota (POL)
5 July 2014; 20:45	3× (yellow card) 4× (suspension)	Report	3× (yellow card) 4× (suspension)	Graditeljska škola Čakovec, Čakovec; Attendance: 300; Referees: Leszczynski, Piechota (POL)

== Knockout stage ==
=== Championship ===
Round of 16
B1	Denmark	37
A4	Czech Republic	23
D3	Brazil	23
C2	France	29
B3	Netherlands	22
A2	Croatia	21
D1	Russia	31
C4	Sweden	18
C3	Portugal	21
D2	Romania	25
A1	South Korea	32
B4	Serbia	28
A3	Norway	24
B2	Germany	27
C1	Hungary	26
D4	Slovenia	20

Quarterfinals
B1	Denmark	36
C2	France	26
B3	Netherlands	33
D1	Russia	43
D2	Romania	27
A1	South Korea	36
B2	Germany	20
C1	Hungary	19

Semifinals
B1	Denmark	29
D1	Russia	31
A1	South Korea	28
B2	Germany	24

Final
D1	Russia	27
A1	South Korea	34
Third place
B1	Denmark	21
B2	Germany	20

==== Eighthfinals ====
7 July 2014; 14:00	Denmark	37–23	Czech Republic	Fran Galović, Koprivnica; Attendance: 100; Referees: El-Sayed, Rashed (EGY)
7 July 2014; 14:00	Kyndbøl 7	(19–10)	Kordovská, Pokorná 5	Fran Galović, Koprivnica; Attendance: 100; Referees: El-Sayed, Rashed (EGY)
7 July 2014; 14:00	2× (yellow card) 2× (suspension)	Report	2× (yellow card) 4× (suspension)	Fran Galović, Koprivnica; Attendance: 100; Referees: El-Sayed, Rashed (EGY)

7 July 2014; 14:00	Portugal	21–25	Romania	Športska dvorana, Dugo Selo; Attendance: 30; Referees: Erdoğan, Özdeniz (TUR)
7 July 2014; 14:00	Mendes 8	(9–10)	Pricopi 9	Športska dvorana, Dugo Selo; Attendance: 30; Referees: Erdoğan, Özdeniz (TUR)
7 July 2014; 14:00	3× (yellow card) 4× (suspension)	Report	3× (yellow card) 2× (suspension)	Športska dvorana, Dugo Selo; Attendance: 30; Referees: Erdoğan, Özdeniz (TUR)

7 July 2014; 16:15	South Korea	32–28	Serbia	Fran Galović, Koprivnica; Attendance: 200; Referees: Leszczynski, Piechota (POL)
7 July 2014; 16:15	Lee Hyo-jin, Yu So-jeong 6	(20–15)	Radosavljević 8	Fran Galović, Koprivnica; Attendance: 200; Referees: Leszczynski, Piechota (POL)
7 July 2014; 16:15	3× (yellow card) 5× (suspension)	Report	4× (yellow card) 4× (suspension)	Fran Galović, Koprivnica; Attendance: 200; Referees: Leszczynski, Piechota (POL)

7 July 2014; 16:15	Brazil	23–29	France	Športska dvorana, Dugo Selo; Attendance: 200; Referees: Boualloucha, Khenissi (TUN)
7 July 2014; 16:15	Pessoa 6	(11–16)	Prouvensier 7	Športska dvorana, Dugo Selo; Attendance: 200; Referees: Boualloucha, Khenissi (TUN)
7 July 2014; 16:15	3× (yellow card) 2× (suspension)	Report	2× (yellow card) 2× (suspension)	Športska dvorana, Dugo Selo; Attendance: 200; Referees: Boualloucha, Khenissi (TUN)

7 July 2014; 18:30	Netherlands	22–21	Croatia	Fran Galović, Koprivnica; Attendance: 1,000; Referees: Gonzales, Prieto (URU)
7 July 2014; 18:30	Smits 9	(12–10)	Dežić 6	Fran Galović, Koprivnica; Attendance: 1,000; Referees: Gonzales, Prieto (URU)
7 July 2014; 18:30	3× (yellow card) 2× (suspension)	Report	3× (yellow card) 1× (suspension)	Fran Galović, Koprivnica; Attendance: 1,000; Referees: Gonzales, Prieto (URU)

7 July 2014; 18:30	Hungary	26–20	Slovenia	Športska dvorana, Dugo Selo; Attendance: 200; Referees: Bethmann, Tzaferopoulos (GRE)
7 July 2014; 18:30	Walfisch 5	(15–12)	Mrmolja 7	Športska dvorana, Dugo Selo; Attendance: 200; Referees: Bethmann, Tzaferopoulos (GRE)
7 July 2014; 18:30	3× (yellow card) 3× (suspension)	Report	3× (yellow card) 6× (suspension)	Športska dvorana, Dugo Selo; Attendance: 200; Referees: Bethmann, Tzaferopoulos (GRE)

7 July 2014; 20:45	Norway	24–27	Germany	Fran Galović, Koprivnica; Attendance: 300; Referees: Grillo, Lenci (ARG)
7 July 2014; 20:45	Oftedal 8	(12–13)	Smits 8	Fran Galović, Koprivnica; Attendance: 300; Referees: Grillo, Lenci (ARG)
7 July 2014; 20:45	3× (yellow card) 4× (suspension)	Report	3× (yellow card)	Fran Galović, Koprivnica; Attendance: 300; Referees: Grillo, Lenci (ARG)

7 July 2014; 20:45	Russia	31–18	Sweden	Športska dvorana, Dugo Selo; Attendance: 100; Referees: Li, Wang (CHN)
7 July 2014; 20:45	Vyakhireva 6	(17–7)	Eriksson 7	Športska dvorana, Dugo Selo; Attendance: 100; Referees: Li, Wang (CHN)
7 July 2014; 20:45	3× (yellow card) 1× (suspension)	Report	3× (yellow card) 2× (suspension)	Športska dvorana, Dugo Selo; Attendance: 100; Referees: Li, Wang (CHN)

==== Quarterfinals ====
9 July 2014; 14:00	Denmark	36–26	France	Fran Galović, Koprivnica; Attendance: 200; Referees: Florescu, Stoia (ROU)
9 July 2014; 14:00	Haugsted 9	(20–13)	Horáček, Niakate 5	Fran Galović, Koprivnica; Attendance: 200; Referees: Florescu, Stoia (ROU)
9 July 2014; 14:00	3× (yellow card) 6× (suspension)	Report	3× (yellow card) 4× (suspension)	Fran Galović, Koprivnica; Attendance: 200; Referees: Florescu, Stoia (ROU)

9 July 2014; 16:15	Netherlands	33–43	Russia	Fran Galović, Koprivnica; Attendance: 264; Referees: Antić, Jakovljević (SRB)
9 July 2014; 16:15	Pavković 5	(13–22)	Khrapova 10	Fran Galović, Koprivnica; Attendance: 264; Referees: Antić, Jakovljević (SRB)
9 July 2014; 16:15	3× (yellow card) 2× (suspension)	Report	3× (yellow card) 1× (suspension)	Fran Galović, Koprivnica; Attendance: 264; Referees: Antić, Jakovljević (SRB)

9 July 2014; 18:30	Romania	27–36	South Korea	Fran Galović, Koprivnica; Attendance: 350; Referees: Arntsen, Røen (NOR)
9 July 2014; 18:30	Constantinescu 6	(12–20)	Yu So-jeong 11	Fran Galović, Koprivnica; Attendance: 350; Referees: Arntsen, Røen (NOR)
9 July 2014; 18:30	3× (yellow card) 6× (suspension)	Report	2× (yellow card) 4× (suspension)	Fran Galović, Koprivnica; Attendance: 350; Referees: Arntsen, Røen (NOR)

9 July 2014; 20:45	Germany	20–19	Hungary	Fran Galović, Koprivnica; Attendance: 500; Referees: Volodkov, Zotin (RUS)
9 July 2014; 20:45	Smits 5	(8–8)	Szekerczés, Tóth 6	Fran Galović, Koprivnica; Attendance: 500; Referees: Volodkov, Zotin (RUS)
9 July 2014; 20:45	3× (yellow card) 1× (suspension)	Report	4× (yellow card) 4× (suspension)	Fran Galović, Koprivnica; Attendance: 500; Referees: Volodkov, Zotin (RUS)

==== Semifinals ====
11 July 2014; 18:30	Denmark	29–31	Russia	Fran Galović, Koprivnica; Attendance: 1,200; Referees: El-Sayed, Rashed (EGY)
11 July 2014; 18:30	Tranborg 7	(13–17)	Dmitrieva 9	Fran Galović, Koprivnica; Attendance: 1,200; Referees: El-Sayed, Rashed (EGY)
11 July 2014; 18:30	2× (yellow card) 2× (suspension)	Report	3× (yellow card) 6× (suspension)	Fran Galović, Koprivnica; Attendance: 1,200; Referees: El-Sayed, Rashed (EGY)

11 July 2014; 20:45	South Korea	28–24	Germany	Fran Galović, Koprivnica; Attendance: 500; Referees: Lenci, Grillo (ARG)
11 July 2014; 20:45	Lee Hyo-jin 11	(15–11)	Smits 8	Fran Galović, Koprivnica; Attendance: 500; Referees: Lenci, Grillo (ARG)
11 July 2014; 20:45	4× (yellow card) 4× (suspension)	Report	3× (yellow card) 4× (suspension)	Fran Galović, Koprivnica; Attendance: 500; Referees: Lenci, Grillo (ARG)

==== Bronze medal game ====
13 July 2014; 14:00	Denmark	21–20	Germany	Fran Galović, Koprivnica; Attendance: 300; Referees: Antić, Jakovljević (SRB)
13 July 2014; 14:00	three players 5	(11–14)	Weigel 6	Fran Galović, Koprivnica; Attendance: 300; Referees: Antić, Jakovljević (SRB)
13 July 2014; 14:00	3× (yellow card)	Report	3× (yellow card) 3× (suspension)	Fran Galović, Koprivnica; Attendance: 300; Referees: Antić, Jakovljević (SRB)

==== Final ====
13 July 2014; 16:30	Russia	27–34	South Korea	Fran Galović, Koprivnica; Referees: Arntsen, Røen (NOR)
13 July 2014; 16:30	Vyakhireva 9	(10–16)	Lee Hyo-jin, Yu So-jeong 9	Fran Galović, Koprivnica; Referees: Arntsen, Røen (NOR)
13 July 2014; 16:30	3× (yellow card) 4× (suspension)	Report	2× (yellow card) 4× (suspension)	Fran Galović, Koprivnica; Referees: Arntsen, Røen (NOR)

=== 5–8th place playoffs ===
Semifinals
11 July
France	31
Netherlands	25
11 July
Romania	25
Hungary	24

Fifth place
13 July
France	31
Romania	19
Seventh place
13 July
Netherlands	18
Hungary	36

==== 5–8th place semifinals ====
11 July 2014; 14:00	France	31–25	Netherlands	Fran Galović, Koprivnica; Attendance: 200; Referees: Gonzales, Prieto (URU)
11 July 2014; 14:00	Niakate 9	(14–11)	Smits, van Duivenbode 6	Fran Galović, Koprivnica; Attendance: 200; Referees: Gonzales, Prieto (URU)
11 July 2014; 14:00	3× (yellow card) 3× (suspension)	Report	3× (yellow card) 2× (suspension)	Fran Galović, Koprivnica; Attendance: 200; Referees: Gonzales, Prieto (URU)

11 July 2014; 16:15	Romania	25–24	Hungary	Fran Galović, Koprivnica; Attendance: 500; Referees: Koo, Lee (KOR)
11 July 2014; 16:15	Constantinescu 6	(14–15)	Szekerczés 9	Fran Galović, Koprivnica; Attendance: 500; Referees: Koo, Lee (KOR)
11 July 2014; 16:15	4× (yellow card) 5× (suspension)	Report	3× (yellow card) 2× (suspension)	Fran Galović, Koprivnica; Attendance: 500; Referees: Koo, Lee (KOR)

==== Seventh place game ====
13 July 2014; 09:00	Netherlands	18–36	Hungary	Fran Galović, Koprivnica; Attendance: 200; Referees: Boualloucha, Khenissi (TUN)
13 July 2014; 09:00	Steenbakkers 6	(11–15)	Walfisch, Tóth 7	Fran Galović, Koprivnica; Attendance: 200; Referees: Boualloucha, Khenissi (TUN)
13 July 2014; 09:00	3× (yellow card) 1× (suspension)	Report	3× (yellow card) 3× (suspension)	Fran Galović, Koprivnica; Attendance: 200; Referees: Boualloucha, Khenissi (TUN)

==== Fifth place game ====
13 July 2014; 11:00	France	31–19	Romania	Fran Galović, Koprivnica; Attendance: 200; Referees: Erdoğan, Özdeniz (TUR)
13 July 2014; 11:00	Horáček 7	(15–8)	Perianu 6	Fran Galović, Koprivnica; Attendance: 200; Referees: Erdoğan, Özdeniz (TUR)
13 July 2014; 11:00	2× (yellow card) 1× (suspension)	Report	2× (yellow card) 3× (suspension)	Fran Galović, Koprivnica; Attendance: 200; Referees: Erdoğan, Özdeniz (TUR)

=== 9th–16th place playoffs ===
Quarterfinals
A4	Czech Republic	27
D3	Brazil	26
A2	Croatia	26
C4	Sweden	24
C3	Portugal	26
B4	Serbia	35
A3	Norway	38
D4	Slovenia	24

Semifinals
A4	Czech Republic	23
A2	Croatia	33
B4	Serbia	25
A3	Norway	39

Ninth place
A2	Croatia	26
A3	Norway	34
Eleventh place
A4	Czech Republic	33
B4	Serbia	32

==== 9th–16th place quarterfinals ====
9 July 2014; 14:00	Czech Republic	27–26	Brazil	Športska dvorana, Dugo Selo; Attendance: 50; Referees: Andorka, Hucker (HUN)
9 July 2014; 14:00	Malá 8	(14–14)	Barbosa 7	Športska dvorana, Dugo Selo; Attendance: 50; Referees: Andorka, Hucker (HUN)
9 July 2014; 14:00	3× (yellow card) 2× (suspension)	Report	2× (yellow card) 6× (suspension)	Športska dvorana, Dugo Selo; Attendance: 50; Referees: Andorka, Hucker (HUN)

9 July 2014; 16:00	Croatia	26–24	Sweden	Športska dvorana, Dugo Selo; Attendance: 300; Referees: Erdoğan, Özdeniz (TUR)
9 July 2014; 16:00	Mamić 5	(12–14)	Eriksson 8	Športska dvorana, Dugo Selo; Attendance: 300; Referees: Erdoğan, Özdeniz (TUR)
9 July 2014; 16:00	3× (yellow card) 4× (suspension)	Report	3× (yellow card) 4× (suspension)	Športska dvorana, Dugo Selo; Attendance: 300; Referees: Erdoğan, Özdeniz (TUR)

9 July 2014; 18:00	Portugal	26–35	Serbia	Športska dvorana, Dugo Selo; Attendance: 150; Referees: El-Sayed, Rashed (EGY)
9 July 2014; 18:00	Lopes 8	(16–15)	Radović 10	Športska dvorana, Dugo Selo; Attendance: 150; Referees: El-Sayed, Rashed (EGY)
9 July 2014; 18:00	3× (yellow card) 3× (suspension)	Report	4× (yellow card) 6× (suspension)	Športska dvorana, Dugo Selo; Attendance: 150; Referees: El-Sayed, Rashed (EGY)

9 July 2014; 20:00	Norway	38–24	Slovenia	Športska dvorana, Dugo Selo; Attendance: 300; Referees: Koo, Lee (KOR)
9 July 2014; 20:00	Bakkerud 9	(16–10)	Leski 6	Športska dvorana, Dugo Selo; Attendance: 300; Referees: Koo, Lee (KOR)
9 July 2014; 20:00	2× (yellow card) 2× (suspension)	Report	3× (yellow card)	Športska dvorana, Dugo Selo; Attendance: 300; Referees: Koo, Lee (KOR)

==== 9th–12th place semifinals ====
10 July 2014; 18:00	Czech Republic	23–33	Croatia	Športska dvorana, Dugo Selo; Attendance: 200; Referees: Leszczynski, Piechota (POL)
10 July 2014; 18:00	Kordovská 8	(9–16)	Mamić 8	Športska dvorana, Dugo Selo; Attendance: 200; Referees: Leszczynski, Piechota (POL)
10 July 2014; 18:00	3× (yellow card) 4× (suspension)	Report	3× (yellow card) 4× (suspension)	Športska dvorana, Dugo Selo; Attendance: 200; Referees: Leszczynski, Piechota (POL)

10 July 2014; 20:00	Serbia	25–39	Norway	Športska dvorana, Dugo Selo; Attendance: 250; Referees: Boualloucha, Khenissi (TUN)
10 July 2014; 20:00	Radosavljević, Janjusević 5	(12–22)	Bakkerud 10	Športska dvorana, Dugo Selo; Attendance: 250; Referees: Boualloucha, Khenissi (TUN)
10 July 2014; 20:00	3× (yellow card) 2× (suspension)	Report	3× (yellow card) 1× (suspension)	Športska dvorana, Dugo Selo; Attendance: 250; Referees: Boualloucha, Khenissi (TUN)

==== Eleventh place game ====
12 July 2014; 18:00	Czech Republic	33–32	Serbia	Športska dvorana, Dugo Selo; Attendance: 100; Referees: Florescu, Stoia (ROU)
12 July 2014; 18:00	Malá 12	(15–17)	Radosavljević 10	Športska dvorana, Dugo Selo; Attendance: 100; Referees: Florescu, Stoia (ROU)
12 July 2014; 18:00	3× (yellow card) 5× (suspension)	Report	4× (yellow card) 5× (suspension)	Športska dvorana, Dugo Selo; Attendance: 100; Referees: Florescu, Stoia (ROU)

==== Ninth place game ====
12 July 2014; 20:00	Croatia	26–34	Norway	Športska dvorana, Dugo Selo; Attendance: 400; Referees: Volodkov, Zotin (RUS)
12 July 2014; 20:00	Pavlović 5	(14–15)	Bakkerud, Ingstad 8	Športska dvorana, Dugo Selo; Attendance: 400; Referees: Volodkov, Zotin (RUS)
12 July 2014; 20:00	3× (yellow card) 3× (suspension)	Report	3× (yellow card) 5× (suspension)	Športska dvorana, Dugo Selo; Attendance: 400; Referees: Volodkov, Zotin (RUS)

=== 13th–16th place playoffs ===
Semifinals
10 July
Brazil	20
Sweden	22
10 July
Portugal	26
Slovenia	28

13th place
12 July
Sweden	30
Slovenia	20
15th place
12 July
Brazil	33
Portugal	28

==== 13th–16th place semifinals ====
10 July 2014; 14:00	Brazil	20–22	Sweden	Športska dvorana, Dugo Selo; Attendance: 40; Referees: Antić, Jakovljević (SRB)
10 July 2014; 14:00	Pessoa 4	(8–12)	Eriksson 7	Športska dvorana, Dugo Selo; Attendance: 40; Referees: Antić, Jakovljević (SRB)
10 July 2014; 14:00	3× (yellow card) 4× (suspension)	Report	3× (yellow card) 2× (suspension)	Športska dvorana, Dugo Selo; Attendance: 40; Referees: Antić, Jakovljević (SRB)

10 July 2014; 16:00	Portugal	26–28	Slovenia	Športska dvorana, Dugo Selo; Attendance: 200; Referees: Al-Watani, Qamber (BHR)
10 July 2014; 16:00	Lopes 10	(14–15)	Stanko 6	Športska dvorana, Dugo Selo; Attendance: 200; Referees: Al-Watani, Qamber (BHR)
10 July 2014; 16:00	3× (yellow card) 3× (suspension)	Report	4× (yellow card) 3× (suspension)	Športska dvorana, Dugo Selo; Attendance: 200; Referees: Al-Watani, Qamber (BHR)

==== 15th place game ====
12 July 2014; 14:00	Brazil	33–28	Portugal	Športska dvorana, Dugo Selo; Attendance: 50; Referees: Bethmann, Tzaferopoulos (GRE)
12 July 2014; 14:00	Guarieiro 7	(19–18)	Lopes, Soares 9	Športska dvorana, Dugo Selo; Attendance: 50; Referees: Bethmann, Tzaferopoulos (GRE)
12 July 2014; 14:00	4× (yellow card) 3× (suspension)	Report	3× (yellow card) 5× (suspension)	Športska dvorana, Dugo Selo; Attendance: 50; Referees: Bethmann, Tzaferopoulos (GRE)

==== 13th place game ====
12 July 2014; 16:00	Sweden	30–20	Slovenia	Športska dvorana, Dugo Selo; Attendance: 100; Referees: Andorka, Hucker (HUN)
12 July 2014; 16:00	Ahlen 5	(17–6)	Stanko 6	Športska dvorana, Dugo Selo; Attendance: 100; Referees: Andorka, Hucker (HUN)
12 July 2014; 16:00	3× (yellow card) 3× (suspension)	Report	2× (yellow card) 3× (suspension)	Športska dvorana, Dugo Selo; Attendance: 100; Referees: Andorka, Hucker (HUN)

=== 17–20th place playoffs ===
Semifinals
7 July
Uruguay	27
Argentina	25
7 July
Japan	28
China	27

17th place
9 July
Uruguay	28
Japan	29
19th place
9 July
Argentina	21
China	28

==== 17–20th place semifinals ====
7 July 2014; 14:00	Uruguay	27–25	Argentina	Graditeljska škola Čakovec, Čakovec; Attendance: 100; Referees: Koo, Lee (KOR)
7 July 2014; 14:00	Barreiro 8	(11–11)	Squizziato 6	Graditeljska škola Čakovec, Čakovec; Attendance: 100; Referees: Koo, Lee (KOR)
7 July 2014; 14:00	2× (yellow card) 2× (suspension)	Report	1× (yellow card) 4× (suspension)	Graditeljska škola Čakovec, Čakovec; Attendance: 100; Referees: Koo, Lee (KOR)

7 July 2014; 16:00	Japan	28–27	China	Graditeljska škola Čakovec, Čakovec; Attendance: 150; Referees: Al-Watani, Qamber (BHR)
7 July 2014; 16:00	Fukata, Tamura 7	(15–12)	Zahng Haixia 6	Graditeljska škola Čakovec, Čakovec; Attendance: 150; Referees: Al-Watani, Qamber (BHR)
7 July 2014; 16:00	3× (yellow card) 4× (suspension)	Report	3× (yellow card) 4× (suspension)	Graditeljska škola Čakovec, Čakovec; Attendance: 150; Referees: Al-Watani, Qamber (BHR)

==== 19th place game ====
9 July 2014; 14:00	Argentina	21–28	China	Graditeljska škola Čakovec, Čakovec; Attendance: 50; Referees: Boualloucha, Khenissi (TUN)
9 July 2014; 14:00	Castelli 6	(8–17)	Yu Yuanyuan 6	Graditeljska škola Čakovec, Čakovec; Attendance: 50; Referees: Boualloucha, Khenissi (TUN)
9 July 2014; 14:00	2× (yellow card)	Report	2× (yellow card)	Graditeljska škola Čakovec, Čakovec; Attendance: 50; Referees: Boualloucha, Khenissi (TUN)

==== 17th place game ====
9 July 2014; 16:00	Uruguay	28–29	Japan	Graditeljska škola Čakovec, Čakovec; Attendance: 100; Referees: Bethmann, Tzaferopoulos (GRE)
9 July 2014; 16:00	Barreiro 12	(14–16)	Sasaki 11	Graditeljska škola Čakovec, Čakovec; Attendance: 100; Referees: Bethmann, Tzaferopoulos (GRE)
9 July 2014; 16:00	4× (yellow card) 6× (suspension)	Report	3× (yellow card) 4× (suspension)	Graditeljska škola Čakovec, Čakovec; Attendance: 100; Referees: Bethmann, Tzaferopoulos (GRE)

=== 21–24th place playoffs ===
Semifinals
7 July
Kazakhstan	20
Angola	33
7 July
Congo DR	18
Tunisia	25

21st place
9 July
Angola	30
Tunisia	21
23rd place
9 July
Kazakhstan	23 (4)
Congo DR	23 (1)

==== 21–24th place semifinals ====
7 July 2014; 18:00	Kazakhstan	20–33	Angola	Graditeljska škola Čakovec, Čakovec; Attendance: 100; Referees: Antić, Jakovljević (SRB)
7 July 2014; 18:00	Abilda, Kapralova 4	(10–17)	Nenganga 9	Graditeljska škola Čakovec, Čakovec; Attendance: 100; Referees: Antić, Jakovljević (SRB)
7 July 2014; 18:00	3× (yellow card) 3× (suspension)	Report	2× (yellow card) 2× (suspension)	Graditeljska škola Čakovec, Čakovec; Attendance: 100; Referees: Antić, Jakovljević (SRB)

7 July 2014; 20:00	Congo DR	18–25	Tunisia	Graditeljska škola Čakovec, Čakovec; Attendance: 100; Referees: Andorka, Hucker (HUN)
7 July 2014; 20:00	Tshela 5	(7–11)	Hamrouni, Khouja 5	Graditeljska škola Čakovec, Čakovec; Attendance: 100; Referees: Andorka, Hucker (HUN)
7 July 2014; 20:00	3× (yellow card) 6× (suspension)	Report	3× (yellow card) 1× (suspension)	Graditeljska škola Čakovec, Čakovec; Attendance: 100; Referees: Andorka, Hucker (HUN)

==== 23rd place game ====
9 July 2014; 18:00	Kazakhstan	23–23	Congo DR	Graditeljska škola Čakovec, Čakovec; Attendance: 100; Referees: Akpatsa, Assignon (TOG)
9 July 2014; 18:00	Akhmet, Ukbenova 5	(12–10)	Tshela 7	Graditeljska škola Čakovec, Čakovec; Attendance: 100; Referees: Akpatsa, Assignon (TOG)
9 July 2014; 18:00	2× (yellow card) 5× (suspension)	Report	1× (yellow card) 3× (suspension)	Graditeljska škola Čakovec, Čakovec; Attendance: 100; Referees: Akpatsa, Assignon (TOG)

Kazakhstan won the shootout 4–1.

==== 21st place game ====
9 July 2014; 20:00	Angola	30–21	Tunisia	Graditeljska škola Čakovec, Čakovec; Attendance: 100; Referees: Li, Wang (CHN)
9 July 2014; 20:00	Machado 8	(17–12)	Hamrouni 7	Graditeljska škola Čakovec, Čakovec; Attendance: 100; Referees: Li, Wang (CHN)
9 July 2014; 20:00	3× (yellow card) 2× (suspension)	Report	2× (yellow card) 3× (suspension)	Graditeljska škola Čakovec, Čakovec; Attendance: 100; Referees: Li, Wang (CHN)

== Ranking and statistics ==
=== Final ranking ===
Rank	Team
Gold medal	South Korea
Silver medal	Russia
Bronze medal	Denmark
4	Germany
5	France
6	Romania
7	Hungary
8	Netherlands
9	Norway
10	Croatia
11	Czech Republic
12	Serbia
13	Sweden
14	Slovenia
15	Brazil
16	Portugal
17	Japan
18	Uruguay
19	China
20	Argentina
21	Angola
22	Tunisia
23	Kazakhstan
24	Congo DR

== Medallists ==
Winners	Gold	Silver	Bronze
Players	South Korea: 6. Lee Hyo-jin; 7. Kim Su-jeong; 9. Choi Su-ji; 10. Won Seon-pil; 12. Woo Ha-lim; 13. Jung Ji-min; 14. Lee Han-sol; 15. Kim Jin-sil; 16. Park Sae-young; 17. Kim Hee-jin; 18. Kim Soo-jung; 19. Kim Hye-jin; 20. Hur You-jin; 21. Kim Sang-mi; 23. Jo Su-yeon; 29. Yu So-jeong	Russia: 1. Anastasiia Zykova; 2. Ekaterina Chernova; 7. Daria Dmitrieva; 8. Daria Rusinova; 9. Anastasiia Khrapova; 13. Anna Vyakhireva; 14. Polina Vedekhina; 15. Liudmila Vydrina; 18. Kristina Kozhokar; 21. Evgeniya Petrova; 30. Alena Ikhneva; 34. Elizaveta Malashenko; 41. Yana Kostomakha; 44. Kira Trusova; 55. Ksenia Karpacheva; 94. Evelina Anoshkina	Denmark: 1. Ditte Vind; 4. Kristina Sommer; 5. Julie Kjær Larsen; 6. Freja Cohrt; 7. Annika Meyer; 10. Nadia Offendal; 11. Line Haugsted; 12. Louise Egestorp; 14. Louise Aaskov; 15. Emma Mogensen; 17. Amalie Wichmann; 18. Mette Tranborg; 22. Sofie Blichert Toft; 23. Nadja Lærke Jensen; 24. Sofie Amalie Olsen
Team Officials	(A) Lee Kye-chung (B) (C) (D)	(A) Viacheslav Kirilenko (B) (C) (D)	(A) Heine Eriksen (B) (C) (D)

== Awards ==
=== All-star team ===
All-star team is:

- MPV: Lee Hyo-jin (KOR)
- Goalkeeper: Dinah Eckerle (GER)
- Right wing: Anna Vyakhireva (RUS)
- Right back: Luca Szekerczés (HUN)
- Central back: Daria Dmitrieva (RUS)
- Left back: Line Haugsted (DEN)
- Left wing: Julie Kjær Larsen (DEN)
- Pivot: Won Seon-pil (KOR)

=== Statistics ===
==== Topscorers ====
Rank	Name	Team	Goals	Shots	%
1	Lee Hyo-jin	South Korea	64	100	64%
2	Martina Barreiro	Uruguay	62	95	65.3%
3	Haruno Sasaki	Japan	58	108	53.7%
4	Xenia Smits	Germany	54	111	48.6%
5	Sanja Radosavljević	Serbia	53	76	69.7%
6	Yu So-jeong	South Korea	50	76	65.8%
7	Anna Vyakhireva	Russia	49	70	70.0%
8	Veronika Malá	Czech Republic	49	71	69.0%
9	Anđela Janjušević	Serbia	49	88	55.7%
10	Gabriela Pessoa	Brazil	49	92	53.3%

Source: IHF.info

==== Top goalkeepers ====
Rank	Name	Team	Saves	Shots	%
1	Dinah Eckerle	Germany	128	314	40.8%
2	Petra Kudláčková	Czech Republic	109	308	35.4%
3	Isabel Gois	Portugal	106	302	35.1%
4	Helena Sousa	Angola	95	296	32.1%
5	Park Sae-young	South Korea	86	256	33.6%
6	Selena Aleksić	Serbia	85	287	29.6%
7	Louise Egestorp	Denmark	82	206	39.8%
8	Kristy Zimmermann	Netherlands	82	265	30.9%
9	Klara Hrovatič	Slovenia	81	233	34.8%
10	Catherine Gabriel	France	79	194	40.7%

Source: IHF.info
