= 2014 Pan American Women's Junior Handball Championship =

Tournament details
- Host country: Argentina
- Venue(s): 2 (in 1 host city)
- Dates: April 1–5
- Teams: 6

Final positions
- Champions: Brazil
- Runners-up: Uruguay
- Third place: Argentina
- Fourth place: Paraguay

Tournament statistics
- Matches played: 15
- Top scorer(s): Tamires Lima Araujo (BRA) (35 goals)

Awards
- Best player: Alejandra Scarrone (URU)

The 2014 Pan American Women's Junior Handball Championship took place in Buenos Aires from April 1–5. It acts as the Pan American qualifying tournament for the 2014 Women's Junior World Handball Championship.

== Results ==
Team	Pld	W	D	L	GF	GA	GD	Pts
Brazil	5	4	0	1	164	98	+66	8
Uruguay	5	4	0	1	144	109	+35	8
Argentina	5	4	0	1	131	115	+16	8
Paraguay	5	2	0	3	105	123	-18	4
Canada	5	1	0	4	97	137	-40	2
Chile	5	0	0	5	96	163	-67	0

April 1; 17:30	Brazil	33 – 13	Paraguay	Estadio I.E.F. Romero Brest, Buenos Aires; Referees: Zapata, Ojeda (COL)
April 1; 17:30	Pessoa 7	(14–7)	Gonzalez, Acunã 3	Estadio I.E.F. Romero Brest, Buenos Aires; Referees: Zapata, Ojeda (COL)
April 1; 17:30	3× (yellow card) 3× (suspension)	Report	1× (yellow card) 5× (suspension)	Estadio I.E.F. Romero Brest, Buenos Aires; Referees: Zapata, Ojeda (COL)

April 1; 19:30	Uruguay	35 – 19	Chile	Estadio I.E.F. Romero Brest, Buenos Aires; Referees: Burgos, Delgado (ARG)
April 1; 19:30	Barreiro 9	(12–10)	Zavala 4	Estadio I.E.F. Romero Brest, Buenos Aires; Referees: Burgos, Delgado (ARG)
April 1; 19:30	4× (yellow card) 3× (suspension)	Report	3× (yellow card) 4× (suspension)	Estadio I.E.F. Romero Brest, Buenos Aires; Referees: Burgos, Delgado (ARG)

April 1; 19:30	Argentina	25 – 16	Canada	CeNARD, Buenos Aires; Referees: Zuñiga, Reyes (CUB)
April 1; 19:30	Karsten 8	(15–9)	Grise 4	CeNARD, Buenos Aires; Referees: Zuñiga, Reyes (CUB)
April 1; 19:30	2× (yellow card) 3× (suspension)	Report	3× (yellow card) 6× (suspension)	CeNARD, Buenos Aires; Referees: Zuñiga, Reyes (CUB)

April 2; 15:00	Paraguay	16 – 26	Uruguay	Estadio I.E.F. Romero Brest, Buenos Aires; Referees: Magalhães, Rocha (BRA)
April 2; 15:00	Aluan, Acuña 5	(5–15)	Barreiro, 8	Estadio I.E.F. Romero Brest, Buenos Aires; Referees: Magalhães, Rocha (BRA)
April 2; 15:00	2× (yellow card) 4× (suspension)	Report	2× (yellow card) 2× (suspension)	Estadio I.E.F. Romero Brest, Buenos Aires; Referees: Magalhães, Rocha (BRA)

April 2; 15:00	Canada	20 – 34	Brazil	CeNARD, Buenos Aires; Referees: Sosa, Lemes (URU)
April 2; 15:00	Routhier, Lemay L'Heureux 5	(13–19)	Lima Araujo, 9	CeNARD, Buenos Aires; Referees: Sosa, Lemes (URU)
April 2; 15:00	3× (yellow card)	Report	3× (yellow card) 3× (suspension)	CeNARD, Buenos Aires; Referees: Sosa, Lemes (URU)

April 2; 19:00	Chile	23 – 33	Argentina	CeNARD, Buenos Aires; Referees: Kelson, Silva (BRA)
April 2; 19:00	Zavala 6	(10–15)	three players 6	CeNARD, Buenos Aires; Referees: Kelson, Silva (BRA)
April 2; 19:00	4× (yellow card) 2× (suspension)	Report	2× (yellow card) 2× (suspension)	CeNARD, Buenos Aires; Referees: Kelson, Silva (BRA)

April 3; 17:00	Brazil	28 – 29	Uruguay	Estadio I.E.F. Romero Brest, Buenos Aires; Referees: Burgos, Delgado (ARG)
April 3; 17:00	Gonçalvez 7	(13–18)	Scarrone, 11	Estadio I.E.F. Romero Brest, Buenos Aires; Referees: Burgos, Delgado (ARG)
April 3; 17:00	3× (yellow card) 5× (suspension) 1× (red card)	Report	4× (yellow card) 4× (suspension)	Estadio I.E.F. Romero Brest, Buenos Aires; Referees: Burgos, Delgado (ARG)

April 3; 19:00	Canada	27 – 23	Chile	Estadio I.E.F. Romero Brest, Buenos Aires; Referees: Zapata, Ojeda (COL)
April 3; 19:00	Marcoux 6	(13–10)	Zavala 6	Estadio I.E.F. Romero Brest, Buenos Aires; Referees: Zapata, Ojeda (COL)
April 3; 19:00	3× (yellow card) 1× (suspension)	Report	3× (yellow card) 2× (suspension)	Estadio I.E.F. Romero Brest, Buenos Aires; Referees: Zapata, Ojeda (COL)

April 3; 19:00	Argentina	26 – 19	Paraguay	CeNARD, Buenos Aires; Referees: Magalhães, Rocha (BRA)
April 3; 19:00	Campigli, Sans 5	(11–11)	Aluan, Feschenko 5	CeNARD, Buenos Aires; Referees: Magalhães, Rocha (BRA)
April 3; 19:00	3× (yellow card) 4× (suspension)	Report	3× (yellow card) 5× (suspension)	CeNARD, Buenos Aires; Referees: Magalhães, Rocha (BRA)

April 4; 17:00	Paraguay	25 – 17	Canada	Estadio I.E.F. Romero Brest, Buenos Aires; Referees: Kelson, Silva (BRA)
April 4; 17:00	Acuña 8	(15–7)	Routhier, Grise 5	Estadio I.E.F. Romero Brest, Buenos Aires; Referees: Kelson, Silva (BRA)
April 4; 17:00	3× (yellow card) 4× (suspension)	Report	3× (yellow card) 3× (suspension)	Estadio I.E.F. Romero Brest, Buenos Aires; Referees: Kelson, Silva (BRA)

April 4; 19:00	Brazil	36 – 18	Chile	Estadio I.E.F. Romero Brest, Buenos Aires; Referees: Zuñiga, Reyes (CUB)
April 4; 19:00	da Silva 7	(15–7)	Zavala, Grise 5	Estadio I.E.F. Romero Brest, Buenos Aires; Referees: Zuñiga, Reyes (CUB)
April 4; 19:00	2× (yellow card) 3× (suspension)	Report	2× (yellow card) 1× (suspension)	Estadio I.E.F. Romero Brest, Buenos Aires; Referees: Zuñiga, Reyes (CUB)

April 4; 19:00	Uruguay	24 – 29	Argentina	CeNARD, Buenos Aires; Referees: Antic, Jakovjlevic (SRB)
April 4; 19:00	Scarrone 6	(11–12)	Casannello 7	CeNARD, Buenos Aires; Referees: Antic, Jakovjlevic (SRB)
April 4; 19:00	4× (yellow card) 4× (suspension)	Report	1× (yellow card)	CeNARD, Buenos Aires; Referees: Antic, Jakovjlevic (SRB)

April 5; 15:00	Uruguay	30 – 17	Canada	Estadio I.E.F. Romero Brest, Buenos Aires; Referees: Zuñiga, Reyes (CUB)
April 5; 15:00	Barreiro 10	(12–9)	Routhier, Gosselin 4	Estadio I.E.F. Romero Brest, Buenos Aires; Referees: Zuñiga, Reyes (CUB)
April 5; 15:00	2× (yellow card) 2× (suspension)	Report	2× (yellow card) 2× (suspension)	Estadio I.E.F. Romero Brest, Buenos Aires; Referees: Zuñiga, Reyes (CUB)

April 5; 17:00	Chile	13 – 32	Paraguay	Estadio I.E.F. Romero Brest, Buenos Aires; Referees: Zapata, Ojeda (COL)
April 5; 17:00	Zavala 8	(7–15)	Fleitas 10	Estadio I.E.F. Romero Brest, Buenos Aires; Referees: Zapata, Ojeda (COL)
April 5; 17:00	2× (yellow card) 4× (suspension)	Report	1× (yellow card) 1× (suspension)	Estadio I.E.F. Romero Brest, Buenos Aires; Referees: Zapata, Ojeda (COL)

April 5; 19:00	Argentina	18 – 33	Brazil	CeNARD, Buenos Aires; Referees: Antic, Jakovjlevic (SRB)
April 5; 19:00	Karsten, Sans 5	(10–17)	Lima Araujo 10	CeNARD, Buenos Aires; Referees: Antic, Jakovjlevic (SRB)
April 5; 19:00	2× (yellow card) 4× (suspension)	Report	2× (yellow card) 4× (suspension)	CeNARD, Buenos Aires; Referees: Antic, Jakovjlevic (SRB)

== Final standing ==
Rank	Team
Gold medal	Brazil
Silver medal	Uruguay
Bronze medal	Argentina
4	Paraguay
5	Canada
6	Chile

Team advanced to the 2014 Women's Junior World Handball Championship

== Awards ==
All-star team

- Goalkeeper: (Brazil) Gabriela Gonçalves
- Right Wing: (Uruguay) Martina Barreiro
- Right Back: (Argentina) Elke Karsten
- Playmaker: (Uruguay) Alejandra Scarrone
- Left Back: (Paraguay) Ana Acuña
- Left Wing: (Brazil) Bruna Gonçalves
- Pivot: (Brazil) Tamires Lima
- Best Player (Uruguay) Alejandra Scarrone
