= Hee-jin =

- Hangul: 희진
- RR: Huijin
- MR: Hŭijin
- IPA: [çi.d͡ʑin]

Hee-jin, also spelled Hui-jin, is a Korean given name.

People with this name include:

== Entertainers ==
- Park Hee-jin (actress) (born 1973), South Korean actress
- Woo Hee-jin (born 1975), South Korean actress
- Lee Hee-jin (born 1979), South Korean singer
- Jang Hee-jin (born 1983), South Korean actress
- Han Ji-an (born Kim Hee-jin, 1991), South Korean actress
- Heejin (born Jeon Hee-jin, 2000), South Korean singer, member of girl groups Loona and Artms

== Sportspeople ==
- Park Hee-jin (freestyle skier) (born 1979), South Korean freestyle skier
- Chang Hee-jin (born 1986), South Korean swimmer
- Kim Hee-jin (born 1991), South Korean volleyball player
- Kim Hee-jin (handballer) (born 1995), South Korean handball player

== Other ==
- Park Hee-jin (1931–2015), South Korean poet
- Min Hee-jin (born 1979), South Korean creative director

== See also ==
- List of Korean given names
