= Hyo-jin =

- Hangul: 효진
- RR: Hyojin
- MR: Hyojin

Hyo-jin is a Korean given name.

People with this name include:

== Entertainers ==
- Gong Hyo-jin (born 1980), South Korean actress
- JeA (born Kim Hyo-jin, 1981), South Korean singer, member of girl group Brown Eyed Girls
- Narsha (born Park Hyo-jin, 1981), South Korean singer, member of girl group Brown Eyed Girls
- Kim Hyo-jin (born 1984), South Korean actress
- Go Eun-ah (born Bang Hyo-jin, 1988), South Korean actress
- Elly (rapper) (born Ahn Hyo-jin, 1991), South Korean singer, member of girl group EXID
- Hyojin (born 1994), South Korean singer, member of boy group ONF

== Sportspeople ==
- Choi Hyo-jin (born 1983), South Korean football player
- Yeo Hyo-Jin (born 1983), South Korean football player
- Ku Hyo-jin (born 1985), South Korean swimmer
- Yang Hyo-jin (born 1989), South Korean volleyball player
- Lee Hyo-jin (born 1994), South Korean handball player

== See also ==
- List of Korean given names
