= Kristina Kozhokar =

Russian handball player

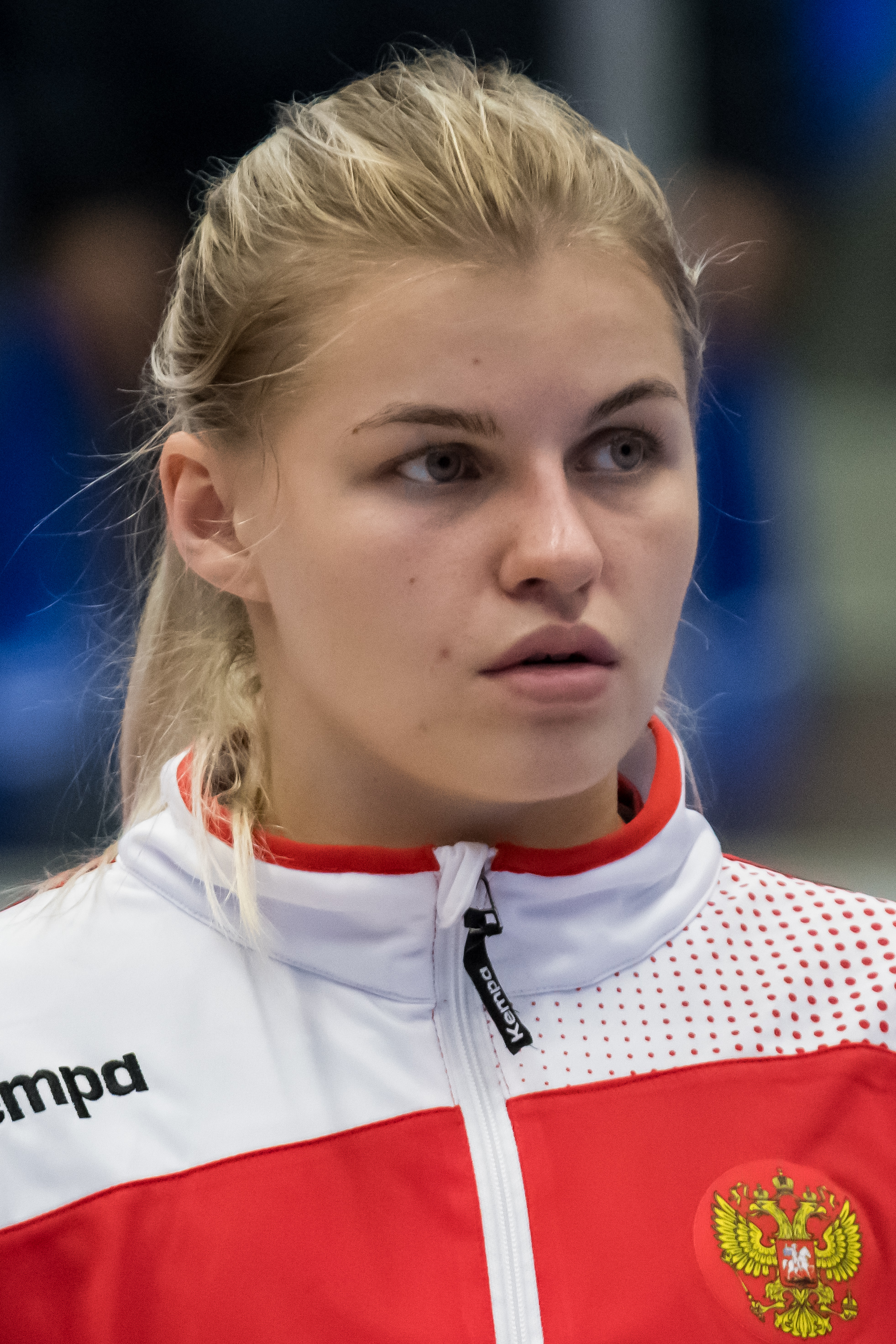

Personal information
- Full name: Kristina Viktorovna Kozhokar
- Nationality: Russian
- Born: 28 February 1994 (age 32) Tolyatti, Russia
- Height: 1.74 m (5 ft 9 in)

Sport
- Sport: Handball
- Position: Left wing
- Current club: Rostov-Don
- Number: 63

Senior clubs
- Years: Team
- –2015: Zvezda Zvenigorod
- 2015–2018: HC Astrakhanochka
- 2018–: Rostov-Don
National team
Years	Team	Apps	(Gls)
2019–	Russia	42	(66)
Medal record
World Championship
Bronze medal – third place	2019 Japan
Junior World Championship
Silver medal – second place	2014 Croatia

Kristina Viktorovna Kozhokar (Russian: Кристина Викторовна Кожокарь; born 28 February 1994) is a Russian handballer for Rostov-Don and the Russian national team.
