= Dinah Eckerle =

German handball player (born 1995)

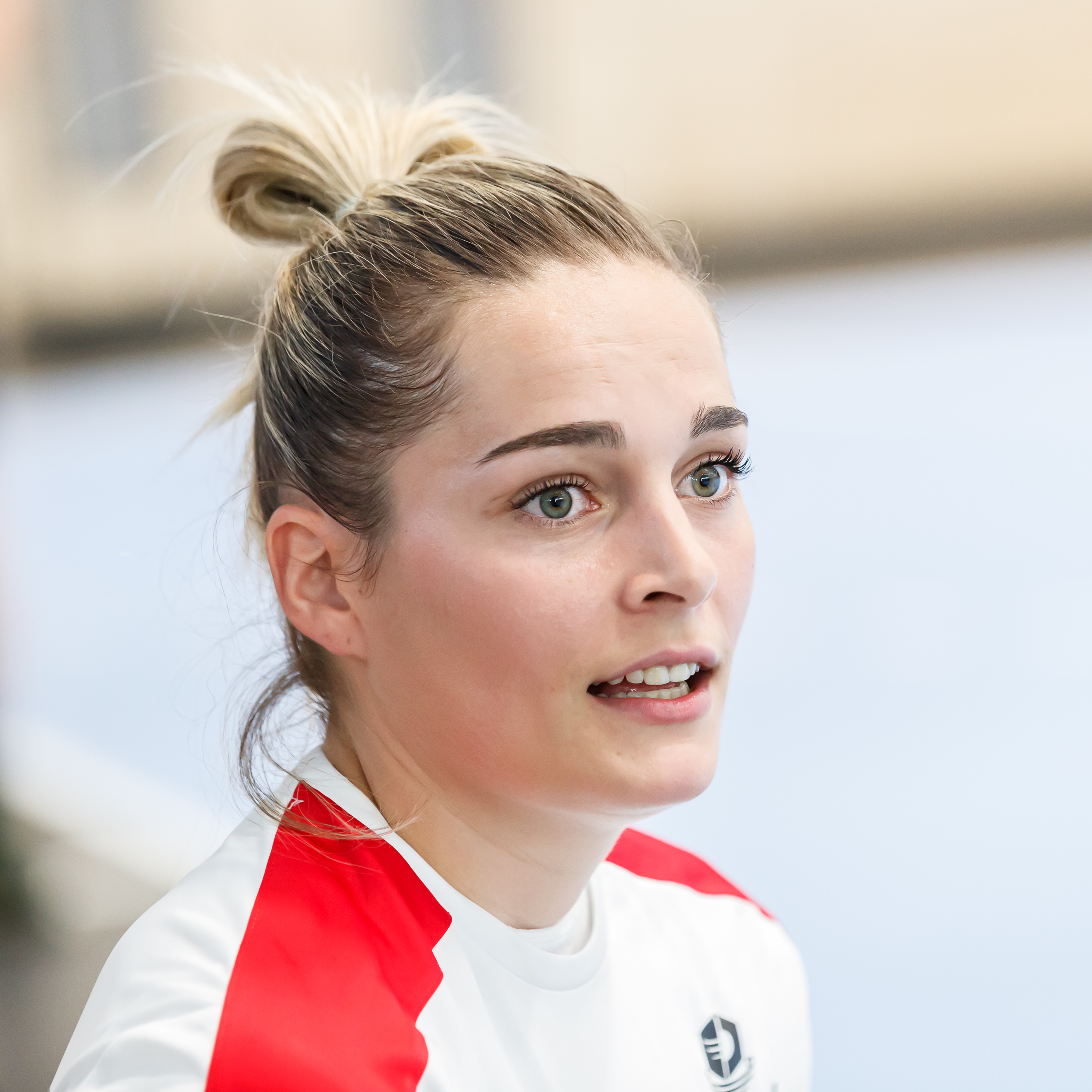

Personal information
- Nationality: German
- Born: 16 October 1995 (age 31) Leonberg, Germany
- Height: 1.71 m (5 ft 7 in)

Sport
- Sport: Handball
- Position: Goalkeeper
- Current club: Metz Handball
- Number: 23

Youth career
- Years: Team
- 2003–2008: GSV Hemmingen
- 2008–2009: TSF Ditzingen
- 2009–2011: Thüringer HC

Senior clubs
- Years: Team
- 2011–2018: Thüringer HC
- 2018–2020: SG BBM Bietigheim
- 2020: Siófok KC
- 2020–2021: Metz Handball
- 2021–2023: Team Esbjerg
- 2023-: Thüringer HC
National team
Years	Team	Apps	(Gls)
2015–	Germany	79	(3)
- Updated on 28 may 2025

Dinah Eckerle (born 16 October 1995) is a German handballer for Team Esbjerg and the Germany national team.

== Achievements ==
- Handball-Bundesliga:
  - Winner: 2012, 2013, 2014, 2015, 2016, 2018
- DHB-Pokal:
  - Winner: 2013
- DHB-Supercup:
  - Winner: 2015, 2016
- Danish Championship:
  - Winner: 2023
- Danish Cup
  - Winner: 2022

== Individual awards ==
- All-Star Goalkeeper of the IHF Junior World Championship: 2014
