= Daniela Gustin =

Swedish handball player (born 1994)

Personal information
- Nationality: Swedish
- Born: 11 May 1994 (age 32) Backa, Sweden
- Height: 1.81 m (5 ft 11 in)

Sport
- Sport: Handball
- Position: Right wing

Senior clubs
- Years: Team
- 2011–2013: Kärra HF
- 2013–2014: TSV Nord Harrislee
- 2014–2016: Füchse Berlin
- 2016–2018: Randers HK
- 2018–2019: SG BBM Bietigheim
- 2019–2021: Horsens HK
- 2021–2022: SønderjyskE Håndbold
National team
Years	Team	Apps	(Gls)
2016–2022	Sweden	31	(66)

Daniela Gustin (born 11 May 1994) is a Swedish former handball player, who last played for SønderjyskE Håndbold and the Swedish national team.

== Personal life ==
She is engaged to handballer Hampus Wanne.
