= Louise Egestorp =

Danish handball player (born 1994)

Personal information
- Full name: Louise Egestorp
- Nationality: Danish
- Born: 28 February 1994 (age 32) Copenhagen, Denmark
- Height: 1.77 m (5 ft 10 in)

Sport
- Sport: Handball
- Position: Goalkeeper
- Current club: Nykøbing Falster
- Number: 16

Youth career
- Years: Team
- –: Ajax København

Senior clubs
- Years: Team
- 2010-2014: FC Midtjylland
- 2014-2015: VfL Oldenburg
- 2016-2017: SønderjyskE Håndbold
- 2017-2019: TTH Holstebro
- 2019-2020: Ajax København
- 2020-2023: NFH
National team
Years	Team	Apps
–	Denmark youth teams	2
Medal record
Women's handball
Representing Denmark
Youth World Championship
Gold medal – first place	2012 Montenegro
U-17 European Championship
Silver medal – second place	2011 Czech Republic

Louise Egestorp (born 28 February 1994) is a Danish former handball player who played for Nykøbing Falster Håndboldklub. She retired at the end of the 2022/2023 season.

== Career ==
Egestorp started playing at Ajax København. In 2010 she switched to FC Midtjylland. In 2013/2014 she reached the final four of the EHF Champions League with the club. For the 2014/2015 she switched to the second-tier team Roskilde Håndbold.

In 2015 she switched to German Bundesliga team, but returned to Denmark a year later for personal reasons. She signed for Danish second-tier team SønderjyskE Håndbold. A year later she signed for top tier side Team Tvis Holstebro, when Marianne Lundsby was out of the team due to pregnancy.

In 2019 she returned to her childhood club Ajax København. She played here for a year, before joining Nykøbing Falster Håndboldklub, to replace the pregnant Cecilie Greve.

In the 2022/2023 she was herself away from the handball pitch for maternaty leave.

She retired at the end of the 2022/2023 season.
