= Yelshat Ukbenova =

Kazakhstani handball player

Personal information
- Nationality: Kazakhstani
- Born: 28 February 1994 (age 32)
- Height: 1.68 m (5 ft 6 in)

Sport
- Sport: Handball
- Position: Pivot
- Current club: Almaty Region Handball
National team
| Years | Team | Apps | (Gls) |
| – | Kazakhstan | 8 | (45) |

Yelshat Ukbenova (born 28 February 1994) is a Kazakhstani handball player. She plays for the club Almaty Region Handball and is member of the Kazakhstani national team. She competed at the 2015 World Women's Handball Championship in Denmark.
