= Elke Karsten =

Argentine handball player

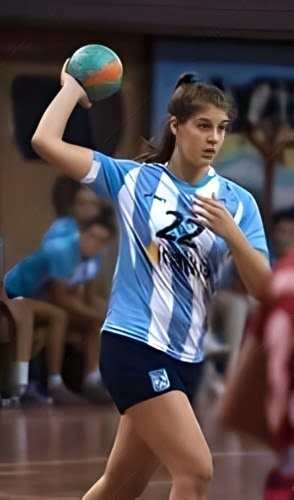

Personal information
- Full name: Elke Josselinne Karsten
- Born: 15 May 1995 (age 31) Quilmes, Argentina
- Height: 1.77 m (5 ft 10 in)

Sport
- Sport: Handball
- Position: Left back
- Current club: free

Senior clubs
- Years: Team
- 2013–2016: AACF Quilmes
- 2016–2017: CBF Málaga Costa del Sol
- 2017–2019: BM Bera Bera
- 2019–2021: Debreceni VSC
- 2021–2022: Molde Elite
- 08-12/2022: Bourg-de-Péage DHB
- 01/2023–: BM Bera Bera
National team
Years	Team	Apps	(Gls)
2013–	Argentina	129	(451)
Medal record
Pan American Games
Silver medal – second place	2015 Toronto	Team
Silver medal – second place	2019 Lima	Team
Silver medal – second place	2023 Santiago	Team
Pan American Championship
Silver medal – second place	2017 Argentina
Bronze medal – third place	2015 Cuba
South and Central American Championship
Silver medal – second place	2018 Brazil
Silver medal – second place	2021 Paraguay
Silver medal – second place	2022 Argentina
Pan American Junior Championship
Bronze medal – third place	2014 Argentina
- Updated on 3 August 2024

Elke Josselinne Karsten (born 15 May 1995) is an Argentine handball player for Molde Elite and the Argentina women's national handball team.

== Career ==
Karsten started playing handball at Asociación Alemana de Cultura Física de Quilmes. In 2016 she joined the Spanish team CBF Málaga Costa del Sol. A year later she joined BM Bera Bera in the top division. Here she won the Spanish Championship in her first season.

In 2019 she joined the Hungarian team Debreceni VSC.

In 2021 she joined Molde HK in Norway. She played for the club for one season, where she reached the final of the Norwegian Women's Handball Cup, where they lost to Vipers Kristiansand.

She then signed for French team Bourg-de-Péage DHB. When the team declared bankruptcy in December 2022, she returned to BM Bera Bera in January 2023. With the team she won the Spanish Championship in 2024 and 2025 as well as the Spanish Cup in 2023, 2024 and 2025.

After a shoulder operation in the summer of 2026, she took a half year's break from handball.

== National team ==
Karsten made her debut for the Argentina national team in 2013, and the same year she represented them at the 2013 World Women's Handball Championship in Serbia.

At the 2015 Pan American Women's Handball Championship she won a silver memdal. Later the same year she represented Argentina at the 2015 World Women's Handball Championship.

She also represented them at the 2016 Olympics in Rio de Janeiro.

At the 2019 and 2023 Pan American Games she won silver medals.

In 2023 she played at the 2023 World Women's Handball Championship, where Argentina finished 20th.

== Achievements ==
- Spanish Championship:
  - Winner: 2018, 2024, 2025
- Spanish Cup:
  - Winner: 2023, 2024, 2025
- Norwegian Cup:
  - Finalist: 2021

== Individual awards ==
- 2014 Pan American Women's Junior Handball Championship: All Star Team Right Back
- 2019 Pan American Games: Top scorer
- 2021 South and Central American Women's Handball Championship: All star team right back
