= Lee Han-sol =

South Korean handball player (born 1995)

Personal information
- Nationality: South Korean
- Born: 23 August 1995 (age 31)
- Height: 1.80 m (5 ft 11 in)

Sport
- Sport: Handball
- Position: Line player
- Current club: SK Sugar Gliders
National team
Years	Team	Apps	(Gls)
–	South Korea	4	(9)
Medal record
Asian Championship
Gold medal – first place	2021 Jordan

Lee Han-sol (Korean: 이한솔; born 23 August 1995) is a South Korean handball player for SK Sugar Gliders and the South Korean national team.

She participated at the 2021 World Women's Handball Championship in Spain.
