= Claudia Constantinescu =

Romanian handballer (born 1994)

Personal information
- Full name: Claudia Maria Constantinescu
- Nationality: Romanian
- Born: 18 June 1994 (age 32) Balș, Romania
- Height: 1.77 m (5 ft 10 in)

Sport
- Sport: Handball
- Position: Left Back
- Current club: SCM Craiova

Youth career
- Years: Team
- 2008–2013: CSȘ Caracal

Senior clubs
- Years: Team
- 2013–2019: HC Zalău
- 2019–2020: CSM București
- 2019–2020: → Dunărea Brăila (loan)
- 2020–2022: Rapid București
- 2022–2023: CS Dacia Mioveni 2012
- 2023-: SCM Craiova
National team
- Years: Team
- 2015–: Romania

Claudia Maria Constantinescu (born 18 June 1994) is a Romanian handballer who plays for SCM Craiova.

== Achievements ==
- Cupa României:
  - Winner: 2019
- Liga Națională:
  - Golden Medalist: 2022
  - Silver Medalist: 2019
  - Bronze Medalist: 2017
