= Larissa da Silva =

Brazilian handball player (born 1994)

Personal information
- Full name: Larissa Inae da Silva
- Born: 4 April 1994 (age 32) Jundiaí, Brazil

Sport
- Sport: Handball
- Position: Right wing

Senior clubs
- Years: Team
- –: Jundiaí Handebol Clube
- –2017: AD Santo André
- 2017–2019: Măgura Cisnădie
National team
- Years: Team
- –: Brazil

Larissa Inae da Silva (born 4 April 1994) is a Brazilian handballer who plays for the Brazilian national team.

== Achievements ==
- Liga Națională:
  - Bronze Medalist: 2018
- Torneio Quatro Nações:
  - Gold Medalist: 2017
