= Ivana Dežić =

Croatian handball player (born 1994)

Personal information
- Nationality: Croatian
- Born: 27 July 1994 (age 32) Varaždin, Croatia
- Height: 1.78 m (5 ft 10 in)

Sport
- Sport: Handball
- Position: Right back
- Current club: CS Mioveni
- Number: 30 / 20 in club

Senior clubs
- Years: Team
- –2015: ŽRK Koka Varaždin
- 2015–2018: RK Podravka Koprivnica
- 2018–2019: Pogoń Baltica Szczecin
- 2019–2021: ŽRK Koka Varaždin
- 2021–2022: RK Lokomotiva Zagreb
- 2022–2023: ESBF Besançon
- 2023–: CS Mioveni
National team
Years	Team	Apps	(Gls)
–	Croatia	13	(28)

Ivana Dežić (born 27 July 1994) is a Croatian handball player for CS Mioveni and the Croatian national team.

She participated at the 2018 European Women's Handball Championship.
