= Sanja Radosavljević =

Serbian handball player (born 1994)

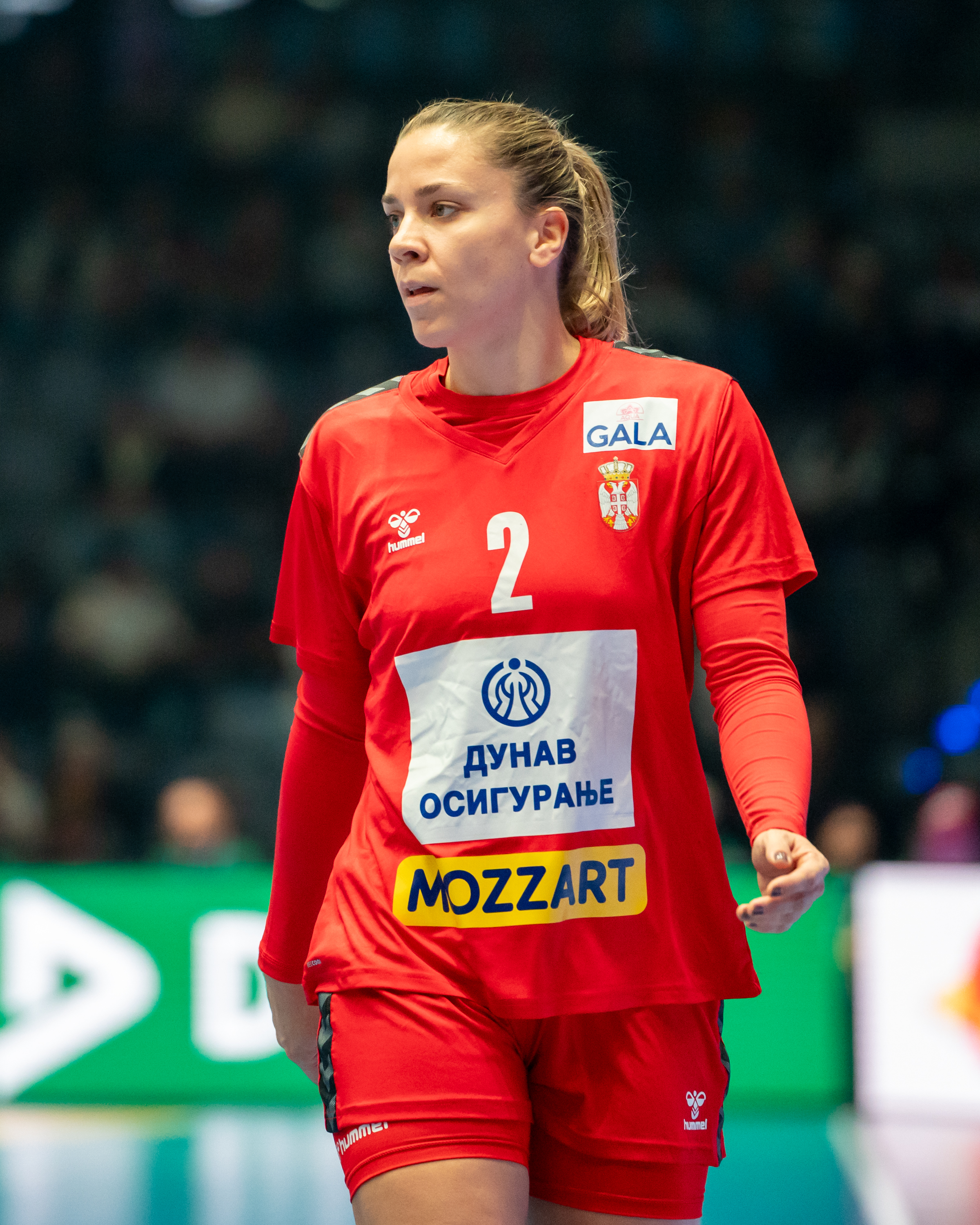

Personal information
- Nationality: Serbian
- Born: 15 January 1994 (age 32) Pančevo, FR Yugoslavia
- Height: 1.71 m (5 ft 7 in)

Sport
- Sport: Handball
- Position: Left wing
- Current club: Kristianstad Handboll
- Number: 2

Senior clubs
- Years: Team
- 2016–2021: Váci NKSE
- 2021–2023: RK Krim
- 2023–2024: Kristianstad Handboll
- 2024–: CS Măgura Cisnădie
National team
Years	Team	Apps	(Gls)
2014-	Serbia	103	(286)
Medal record
Mediterranean Games
Gold medal – first place	2013 Mersin	Team
Summer Universiade
Bronze medal – third place	2015 Gwangju	Team
- Updated on 5 November 2025

Sanja Radosavljević (Serbian Cyrillic: Сања Радосављевић; born 15 January 1994) is a Serbian handball player for Kristianstad Handboll and the Serbian national team.

She competed at the 2015 World Women's Handball Championship in Denmark.
