= Tamires Morena =

Brazilian handball player (born 1994)

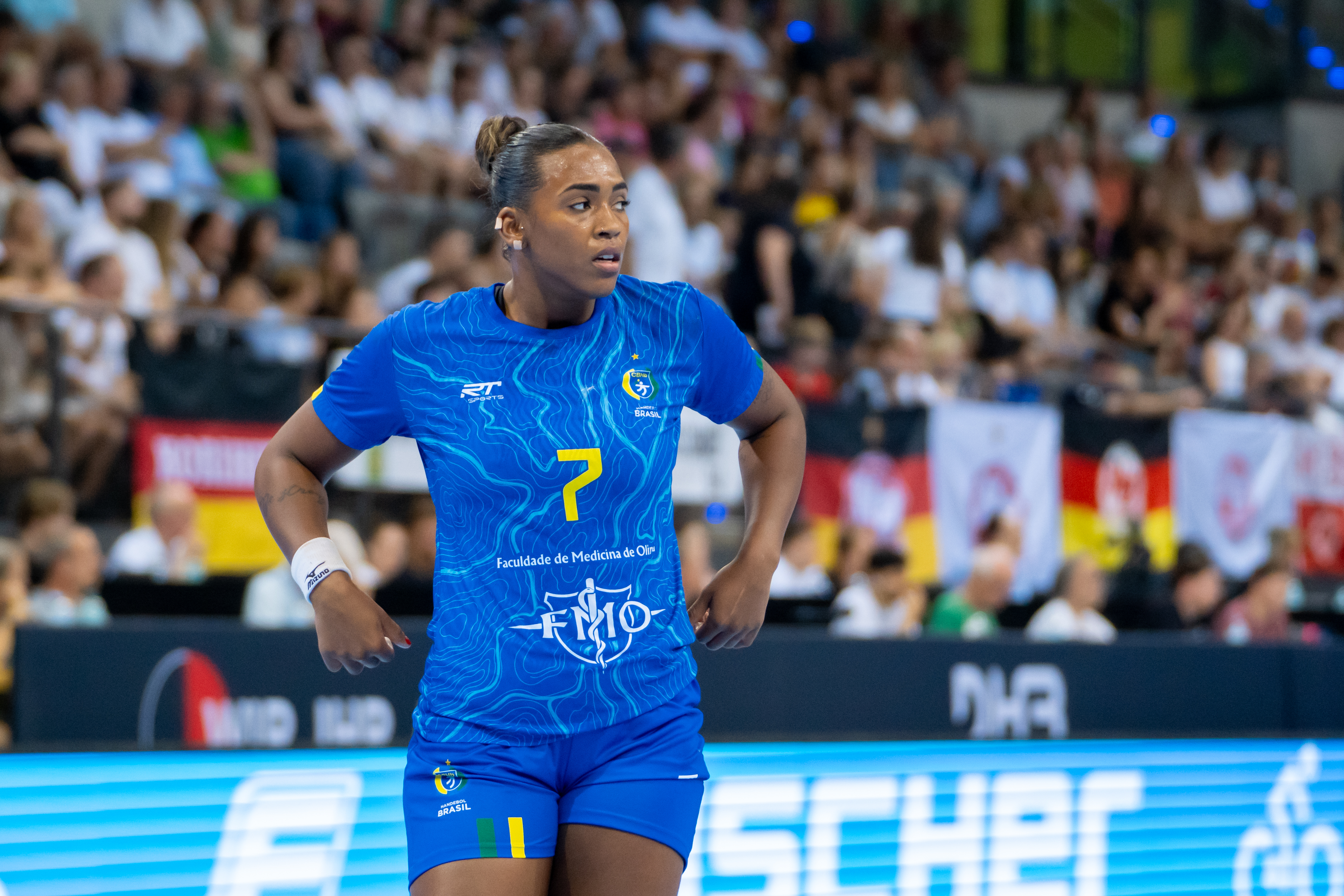
- Tamires Morena Lima in 2024

Personal information
- Full name: Tamires Morena Lima de Araújo
- Born: 16 May 1994 (age 32) Rio de Janeiro, Brazil
- Height: 1.83 m (6 ft 0 in)

Sport
- Sport: Handball
- Position: Pivot
- Current club: CS Gloria 2018 Bistrița-Năsăud
- Number: 7

Senior clubs
- Years: Team
- 2009–2012: ALEF Handebol
- 2013: Vila Olímpica/Concórdia
- 2014: Força Atlética/FAB
- 2015: Győri ETO KC
- 2015–2016: Mosonmagyaróvári KC SE
- 2016–2017: Cercle Dijon Bourgogne
- 2017–2018: Larvik HK
- 2018–2019: Kisvárdai KC
- 2019–2022: Dunărea Brăila
- 2022-2026: CS Gloria 2018 Bistrița-Năsăud
- 2026-: SCM Râmnicu Vâlcea
National team
Years	Team	Apps	(Gls)
–	Brazil	102	(144)
Medal record
Pan American Games
Gold medal – first place	2015 Toronto	Team
Gold medal – first place	2019 Lima	Team
Gold medal – first place	2023 Santiago	Team
Pan American Championship
Gold medal – first place	2015 Cuba
Gold medal – first place	2017 Argentina
South and Central American Championship
Gold medal – first place	2018 Brazil
Gold medal – first place	2021 Paraguay
Gold medal – first place	2024 Brazil
South American Games
Gold medal – first place	2018 Cochabamba	Team
South American Championship
Gold medal – first place	2013 Argentina
Pan American Junior Championship
Gold medal – first place	2014 Argentina

Tamires Morena Lima de Araújo (born 16 May 1994) is a Brazilian handballer for CS Gloria 2018 Bistrița-Năsăud and the Brazilian national team.

Born into a sporting family, her sister Monique is a Brazilian national champion in weightlifting, who also participated at the 2013 World Weightlifting Championships.

Morena Lima initially began with athletics, but a handball coach noticed her height and strength, and saw potential in her in handball. She eventually chose handball and rose through the ranks quickly.

In 2013, she was part of the Brazilian national team that won the South American Championship and a year later she went triumphant with the junior national team at the 2014 Pan American Women's Junior Handball Championship.

She signed a three-and-a-half-year contract with Győri ETO KC in December 2014.

== Achievements ==
- Brazilian National Championship:
  - Winner: 2013
- Pan American Championship:
  - Winner: 2015
- South American Handball Championship:
  - Winner: 2013
- Pan American Junior Championship:
  - Winner: 2014

== Awards and recognition ==
- All-Star Line Player of the Junior Pan American Championship: 2014
- Top scorer of the Junior Pan American Championship: 2014
- 2021 South and Central American Women's Handball Championship: All star team Pivot
