= Jennifer Rode =

German handball player (born 1995)

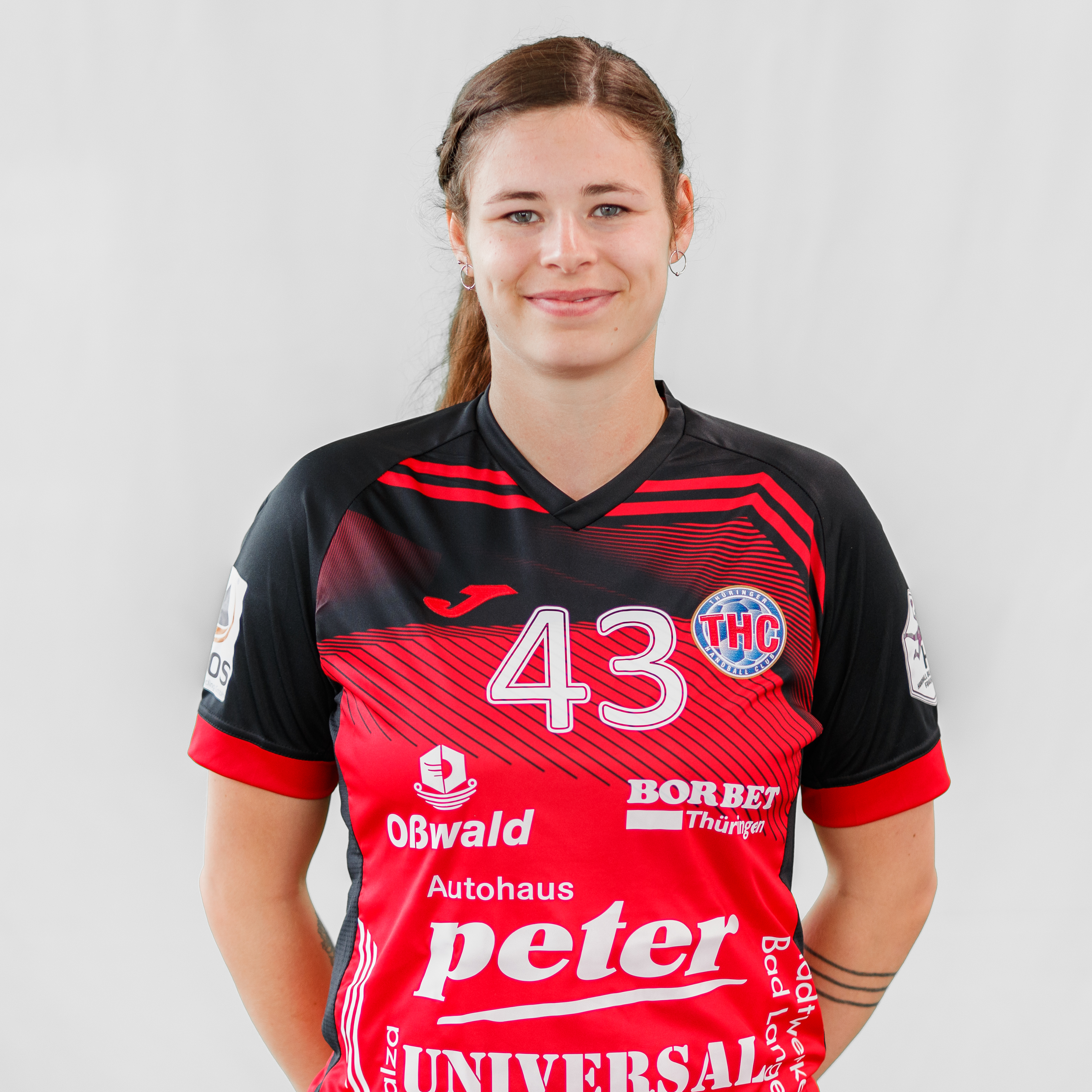

Personal information
- Nationality: German
- Born: 3 August 1995 (age 31) Berlin, Germany
- Height: 1.76 m (5 ft 9 in)

Sport
- Sport: Handball
- Position: Right back/wing
- Current club: Borussia Dortmund
- Number: 43

Senior clubs
- Years: Team
- –2008: MTV 1860 Altlandsberg
- 2008–2013: Frankfurter Handball Club
- 2013–2014: HSG Bensheim/Auerbach
- 2014–2020: Bayer Leverkusen
- 2020–2021: Borussia Dortmund
- 2021–: Thüringer HC
National team
Years	Team	Apps	(Gls)
2015–	Germany	8	(3)

Jennifer Rode (born 3 August 1995) is a German handball player for Borussia Dortmund and the German national team.

She participated at the 2015 World Women's Handball Championship.
