= Elvira Akhmet =

Kazakhstani handball player (born 1994)

Personal information
- Nationality: Kazakhstani
- Born: 2 May 1994 (age 32)
- Height: 1.68 m (5 ft 6 in)

Sport
- Sport: Handball
- Position: Right wing
- Current club: Almaty Region Handball
National team
Years	Team	Apps	(Gls)
–	Kazakhstan	18	(36)

Elvira Akhmet (born 2 May 1994) is a Kazakhstani handball player who plays for the Almaty Region Handball Club and the Kazakhstani national team. She competed at the 2015 World Women's Handball Championship in Denmark.
