= Veronika Malá =

Czech handball player

Veronika Kafka Malá
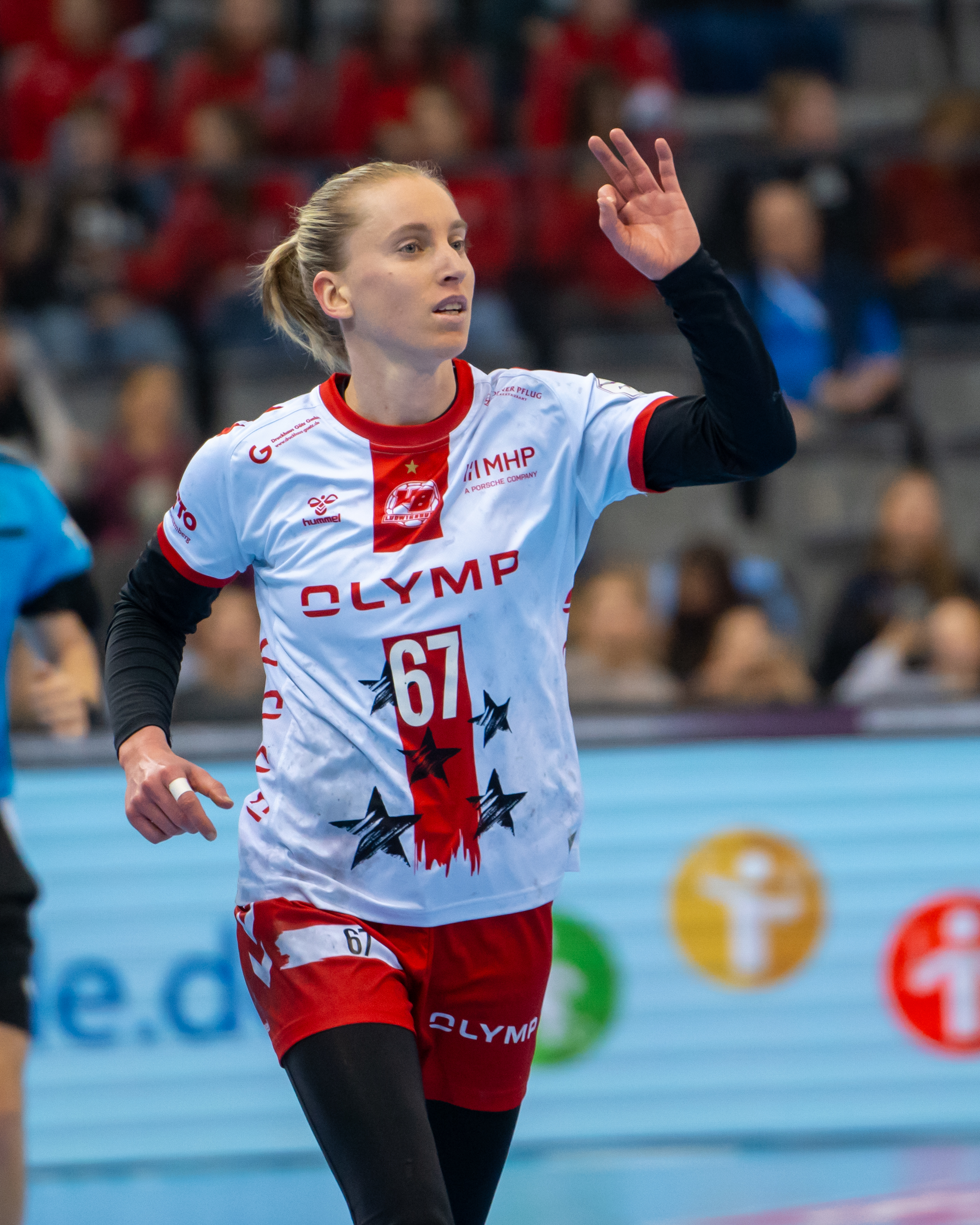

Personal information
- Nationality: Czech
- Born: 6 May 1994 (age 32) Písek, Czech Republic
- Height: 1.70 m (5 ft 7 in)

Sport
- Sport: Handball
- Position: Left wing
- Current club: CS Gloria Bistrița

Senior clubs
- Years: Team
- –2015: Sokol Písek
- 2015–2016: DHC Slavia Prague
- 2016–2017: VfL Oldenburg
- 2017–2021: Paris 92
- 2021–2025: HB Ludwigsburg
- 2025–2026: Storhamar HE
- 2026–: CS Gloria Bistrița
National team
Years	Team	Apps	(Gls)
2015–	Czech Republic	113	(371)

Veronika Kafka Malá (born 6 May 1994) is a Czech handballer for CS Gloria Bistrița and the Czech national team.

She participated at the 2018 European Women's Handball Championship.

== Achievements ==
- EHF European League:
  - Winner: 2022
- Bundesliga:
  - Winner: 2022, 2023
- REMA 1000-ligaen:
  - Silver: 2025/2026
- Norwegian Cup:
  - Winner: 2025
