= Kamila Kordovská =

Czech handball player

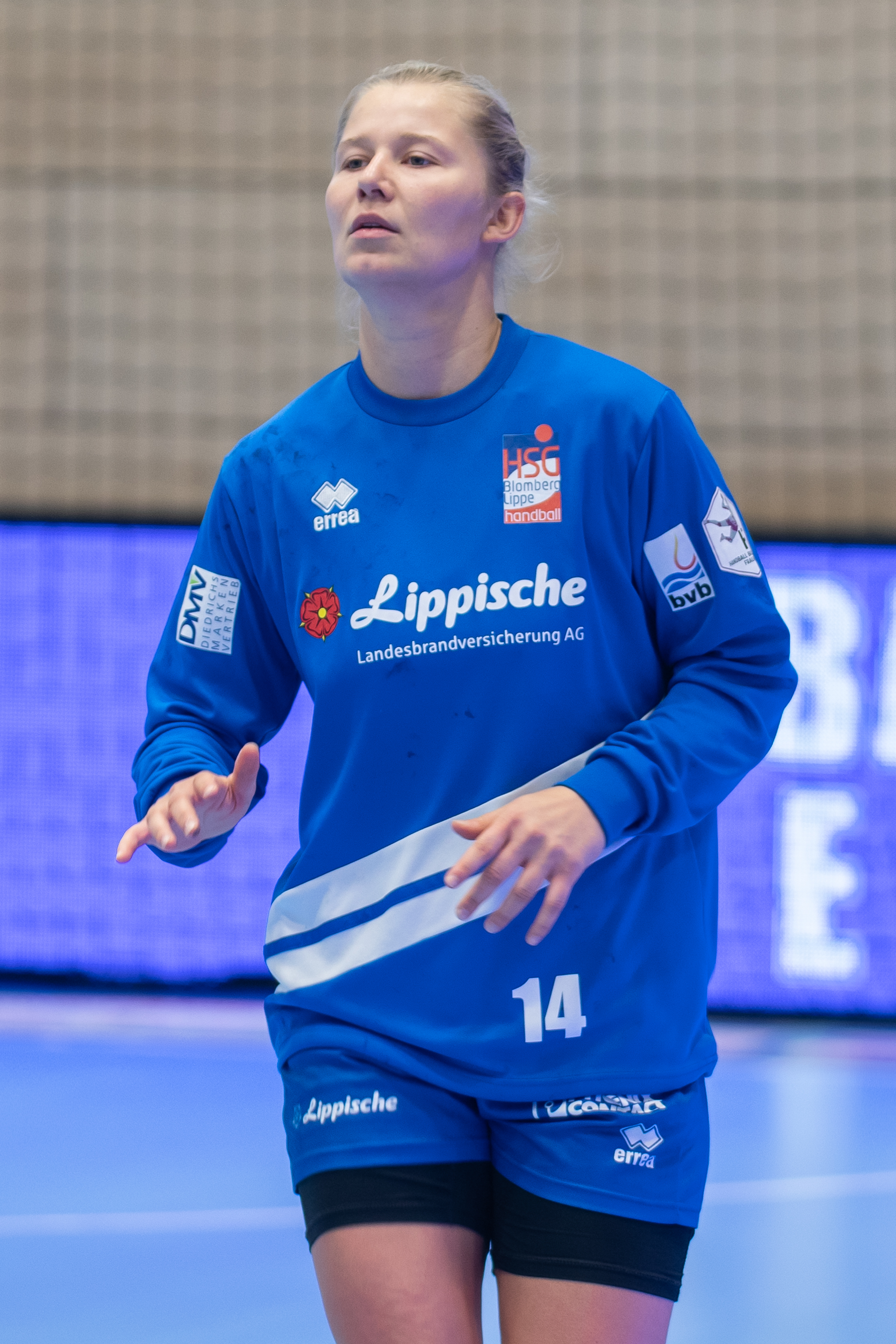

Personal information
- Nationality: Czech
- Born: 4 December 1997 (age 28) Prague, Czech Republic
- Height: 1.79 m (5 ft 10 in)

Sport
- Sport: Handball
- Position: Left back
- Current club: Handball Plan-de-Cuques
- Number: 48

Senior clubs
- Years: Team
- 2013–2017: DHC Slavia Prague
- 2017–2022: HSG Blomberg-Lippe
- 2022–2024: Handball Plan-de-Cuques
National team
Years	Team	Apps	(Gls)
2015–	Czech Republic	96	(185)
- Updated on 14 September 2024

Kamila Kordovská (born 4 December 1997) is a Czech handballer for french league club Handball Plan-de-Cuques and the Czech national team.

She participated at the 2018 European Women's Handball Championship.
