= Mariana Lopes =

Portuguese handball player (born 1994)

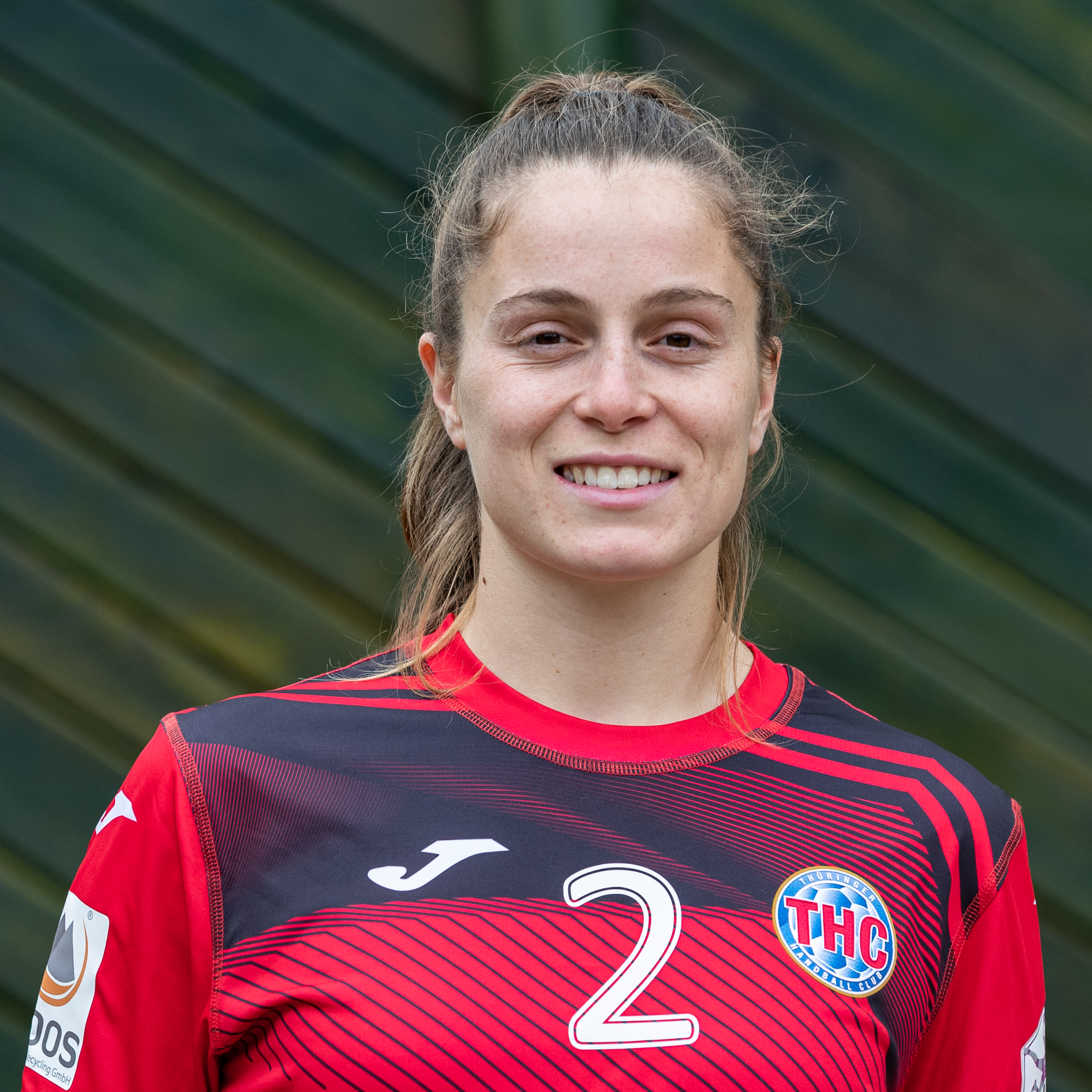

Personal information
- Nationality: Portuguese
- Born: 9 December 1994 (age 31) Aveiro, Portugal
- Height: 1.73 m (5 ft 8 in)

Sport
- Sport: Handball
- Position: Left back
- Current club: CS Gloria Bistrița (handball)
- Number: 7

Senior clubs
- Years: Team
- 2011–2016: AC Alavarium
- 2016–2018: Boden Handboll
- 2018–2019: SV Union Halle-Neustadt
- 2019–2021: Thüringer HC
- 2021–2024: Bayer 04 Leverkusen
- 2024–2025: Békéscsabai Előre NKSE
- 2025-2026: CS Rapid București (handball)
- 2026-: CS Gloria Bistrița (handball)
National team
Years	Team	Apps	(Gls)
2018–	Portugal	70	(241)

Mariana Ferreira Lopes (born 9 December 1994) is a Portuguese handball player who plays centre back for Gloria Bistrița and the Portuguese national team.

She represented Portugal at the 2024 European Women's Handball Championship.
