= Angela Steenbakkers =

Dutch handballer (born 1994)

Personal information
- Nationality: Dutch
- Born: 3 June 1994 (age 32) Venlo, Netherlands
- Height: 1.69 m (5 ft 7 in)

Sport
- Sport: Handball
- Position: Left wing
- Current club: HSG Blomberg-Lippe
- Number: 13

Senior clubs
- Years: Team
- 2012–2014: HandbaL Venlo
- 2014–2017: SERCODAK Dalfsen
- 2017–: HSG Blomberg-Lippe
National team
Years	Team	Apps	(Gls)
–	Netherlands	16	(24)
Medal record
World Championship
Bronze medal – third place	2017 Germany

Angela Steenbakkers (born 3 June 1994) is a Dutch handballer for HSG Blomberg-Lippe and the Dutch national team.
