= Kim Hee-jin (handballer) =

South Korean handball player (born 1995)

Personal information
- Nationality: South Korean
- Born: 17 June 1995 (age 31)
- Height: 1.77 m (5 ft 10 in)

Sport
- Sport: Handball
- Position: Left back
- Current club: Incheon City
National team
- Years: Team
- –: South Korea

Kim Hee-jin (born 17 June 1995) is a South Korean handball player for Incheon City and the South Korean national team.

She participated at the 2017 World Women's Handball Championship.
