= Lee Hyo-jin =

South Korean handball player (born 1994)

Personal information
- Nationality: South Korean
- Born: 22 April 1994 (age 32)
- Height: 1.67 m (5 ft 6 in)

Sport
- Sport: Handball
- Position: Centre back
- Current club: SK Sugar Gliders
National team
- Years: Team
- –: South Korea
Medal record
Asian Championship
Gold medal – first place	2018 Japan
- Lee Hyo-jin
- Hangul: 이효진
- RR: I Hyojin
- MR: I Hyojin

Lee Hyo-jin (born 22 April 1994) is a South Korean handball player for SK Sugar Gliders and the South Korean national team.
