= 2011 European Women's U-17 Handball Championship =

Handball events played in Czech Republic

2011 European U-17 Handball Championship

Tournament details
- Host country: Czech Republic
- Venues: 2 (in 2 host cities)
- Dates: 23 June – 3 July
- Teams: 16 (from 1 confederation)

Final positions
- Champions: Russia
- Runners-up: Denmark
- Third place: Norway
- Fourth place: Hungary

Tournament statistics
- Top scorer: Celine Michielsen (NED)

Awards
- Best player: Nadia Offendal (DEN)

The 2011 European Women's U-17 Handball Championship was the tenth edition of the European Women's U-17 Handball Championship. It took place in the Czech Republic, in two host cities, Brno and Zlín, from June 23 to July 3. Sixteen teams participated on the tournament, including the fifteen qualifying winners and the host nation. Denmark was the defending champion and reached the final this time as well, but fell short against Russia by a single goal.

The tournament also served as the qualification for the forthcoming Youth World Championship. Top seven ranked countries have won the right to represent Europe on the event next year, joined by host nation Montenegro.

== Venues ==
Two cities have been selected to host the European championship, Brno and Zlín.

Brno	2011 European Women's U-17 Handball Championship is located in Czech Republic	Zlín
Sportovní hala Vodova; Capacity: 5,000	2011 European Women's U-17 Handball Championship is located in Czech Republic	Sportovní hala Euronics; Capacity: 2,000

== Draw ==
The draw for the final tournament was held on 8 April 2011 in the EHF headquarters in Vienna, Austria. The teams were allocated to four pots of four, with the eight qualifying group winners put in the first two pots, followed by the host country Czech Republic and the second placed teams in the other two pots.

Pot 1	Pot 2	Pot 3	Pot 4
Denmark; Russia; Norway; France	Hungary; Romania; Sweden; Spain	Czech Republic; Netherlands; Germany; Croatia	Austria; Slovakia; Poland; Portugal

== Preliminary round ==
The sixteen teams were divided into four groups of 4. Top two teams from each group advanced to the Main round to compete for the 1–8 places, while third and fourth placed teams continued the tournament in the Intermediate round, fighting for the 9–16 places.

=== Group A ===
Team	Pld	W	D	L	GF	GA	GD	Pts
Russia	3	3	0	0	91	55	+36	6
Sweden	3	2	0	1	62	64	−2	4
Germany	3	1	0	2	69	81	−12	2
Austria	3	0	0	3	62	88	−26	0

23 June 2011; 12:30	Russia	33 – 23	Germany	Sportovní hala Euronics, Zlín; Attendance: 130; Referees: Mandak, Rudinsky (Slovakia)
23 June 2011; 12:30	Pankovichenko 7	(15–12)	Weigel 8	Sportovní hala Euronics, Zlín; Attendance: 130; Referees: Mandak, Rudinsky (Slovakia)
23 June 2011; 12:30	2× (yellow card) 2× (suspension)	(Report)	3× (yellow card) 4× (suspension)	Sportovní hala Euronics, Zlín; Attendance: 130; Referees: Mandak, Rudinsky (Slovakia)

23 June 2011; 14:30	Sweden	24 – 20	Austria	Sportovní Hala Euronics, Zlín; Attendance: 150; Referees: Gutowska, Gutowska (Poland)
23 June 2011; 14:30	Hejel 6	(9–8)	Kernbichler 6	Sportovní Hala Euronics, Zlín; Attendance: 150; Referees: Gutowska, Gutowska (Poland)
23 June 2011; 14:30	3× (yellow card) 4× (suspension)	(Report)	3× (yellow card) 3× (suspension)	Sportovní Hala Euronics, Zlín; Attendance: 150; Referees: Gutowska, Gutowska (Poland)

24 June 2011; 13:00	Austria	21 – 32	Russia	Sportovní Hala Euronics, Zlín; Referees: Prastalo, Todorović (Bosnia and Herzegovina)
24 June 2011; 13:00	Kietaibl 6	(11–17)	Chernova 6	Sportovní Hala Euronics, Zlín; Referees: Prastalo, Todorović (Bosnia and Herzegovina)
24 June 2011; 13:00	1× (yellow card) 8× (suspension)	(Report)	3× (yellow card) 3× (suspension)	Sportovní Hala Euronics, Zlín; Referees: Prastalo, Todorović (Bosnia and Herzegovina)

24 June 2011; 15:00	Germany	18 – 27	Sweden	Sportovní Hala Euronics, Zlín; Referees: Kijauskaite, Zaliene (Lithuania)
24 June 2011; 15:00	Schnack 6	(9–13)	Berndtsson, Nordström 5	Sportovní Hala Euronics, Zlín; Referees: Kijauskaite, Zaliene (Lithuania)
24 June 2011; 15:00	3× (yellow card) 5× (suspension)	(Report)	2× (yellow card) 2× (suspension)	Sportovní Hala Euronics, Zlín; Referees: Kijauskaite, Zaliene (Lithuania)

26 June 2011; 13:00	Russia	26 – 11	Sweden	Sportovní Hala Euronics, Zlín
26 June 2011; 13:00	Chernova, Denikaeva, Pankovichenko 5	(12–5)	Mässing 4	Sportovní Hala Euronics, Zlín
26 June 2011; 13:00	1× (yellow card) 1× (suspension)	(Report)	2× (yellow card) 3× (suspension)	Sportovní Hala Euronics, Zlín

26 June 2011; 15:00	Germany	28 – 21	Austria	Sportovní Hala Euronics, Zlín; Referees: Mandak, Rudinsky (Slovakia)
26 June 2011; 15:00	Schnack 6	(15–12)	Berisha, Kietaibl 4	Sportovní Hala Euronics, Zlín; Referees: Mandak, Rudinsky (Slovakia)
26 June 2011; 15:00	2× (yellow card) 3× (suspension)	(Report)	2× (yellow card) 4× (suspension)	Sportovní Hala Euronics, Zlín; Referees: Mandak, Rudinsky (Slovakia)

=== Group B ===
Team	Pld	W	D	L	GF	GA	GD	Pts
Denmark	3	3	0	0	96	69	+27	6
Romania	3	2	0	1	89	88	+1	4
Czech Republic	3	1	0	2	81	93	−12	2
Portugal	3	0	0	3	73	89	−16	0

23 June 2011; 16:30	Romania	30 – 29	Portugal	Sportovní Hala Euronics, Zlín; Referees: Crnojevic, Radic (Croatia)
23 June 2011; 16:30	Gavrila	(17–11)	Costa	Sportovní Hala Euronics, Zlín; Referees: Crnojevic, Radic (Croatia)
23 June 2011; 16:30	2× (yellow card) 8× (suspension) 1× (red card)	(Report)	2× (yellow card) 4× (suspension)	Sportovní Hala Euronics, Zlín; Referees: Crnojevic, Radic (Croatia)

23 June 2011; 19:15	Denmark	33 – 26	Czech Republic	Sportovní Hala Euronics, Zlín; Attendance: 700; Referees: Kijauskaite, Zaliene (Lithuania)
23 June 2011; 19:15	Larsen, Meyer 6	(18–14)	Jačková, Nygrýnová 6	Sportovní Hala Euronics, Zlín; Attendance: 700; Referees: Kijauskaite, Zaliene (Lithuania)
23 June 2011; 19:15	3× (yellow card) 3× (suspension)	(Report)	3× (yellow card) 5× (suspension)	Sportovní Hala Euronics, Zlín; Attendance: 700; Referees: Kijauskaite, Zaliene (Lithuania)

24 June 2011; 17:00	Portugal	18 – 32	Denmark	Sportovní Hala Euronics, Zlín; Referees: Mandak, Rudinsky (Slovakia)
24 June 2011; 17:00	Costa 6	(10–16)	Werngreen-Nielsen 5	Sportovní Hala Euronics, Zlín; Referees: Mandak, Rudinsky (Slovakia)
24 June 2011; 17:00	1× (yellow card) 4× (suspension)	(Report)	3× (yellow card) 5× (suspension)	Sportovní Hala Euronics, Zlín; Referees: Mandak, Rudinsky (Slovakia)

24 June 2011; 19:00	Czech Republic	28 – 34	Romania	Sportovní Hala Euronics, Zlín; Attendance: 800; Referees: Gutowska, Gutowska (Poland)
24 June 2011; 19:00	Dufková, Nygrýnová 5	(12–23)	Perianu 13	Sportovní Hala Euronics, Zlín; Attendance: 800; Referees: Gutowska, Gutowska (Poland)
24 June 2011; 19:00	3× (yellow card) 1× (suspension)	(Report)	3× (yellow card) 5× (suspension)	Sportovní Hala Euronics, Zlín; Attendance: 800; Referees: Gutowska, Gutowska (Poland)

26 June 2011; 17:00	Denmark	31 – 25	Romania	Sportovní Hala Euronics, Zlín; Referees: Crnojevic, Radic (Croatia)
26 June 2011; 17:00	Offendal 9	(15–15)	Pricopi 7	Sportovní Hala Euronics, Zlín; Referees: Crnojevic, Radic (Croatia)
26 June 2011; 17:00	2× (yellow card) 1× (suspension)	(Report)	2× (yellow card) 4× (suspension)	Sportovní Hala Euronics, Zlín; Referees: Crnojevic, Radic (Croatia)

26 June 2011; 19:00	Czech Republic	27 – 26	Portugal	Sportovní Hala Euronics, Zlín; Referees: Kijauskaite, Zaliene (Lithuania)
26 June 2011; 19:00	Nygrýnová 7	(13–11)	Fernandes, Soares, Valente 5	Sportovní Hala Euronics, Zlín; Referees: Kijauskaite, Zaliene (Lithuania)
26 June 2011; 19:00	3× (yellow card) 6× (suspension)	(Report)	3× (yellow card) 8× (suspension)	Sportovní Hala Euronics, Zlín; Referees: Kijauskaite, Zaliene (Lithuania)

=== Group C ===
Team	Pld	W	D	L	GF	GA	GD	Pts
Norway	3	3	0	0	99	75	+24	6
Netherlands	3	2	0	1	84	82	+2	4
Spain	3	1	0	2	82	92	−10	2
Poland	3	0	0	3	63	79	−16	0

23 June 2011; 12:30	Norway	39 – 33	Netherlands	Sportovní hala Vodova, Brno; Attendance: 100; Referees: Nastase, Stancu (Romania)
23 June 2011; 12:30	Arntzen 6	(25–10)	Struijs, Michielsen 6	Sportovní hala Vodova, Brno; Attendance: 100; Referees: Nastase, Stancu (Romania)
23 June 2011; 12:30	3× (yellow card) 2× (suspension)	(Report)	2× (yellow card) 2× (suspension)	Sportovní hala Vodova, Brno; Attendance: 100; Referees: Nastase, Stancu (Romania)

23 June 2011; 14:30	Spain	25 – 23	Poland	Sportovní hala Vodova, Brno; Attendance: 100; Referees: Vujacic, Kazanegra (Montenegro)
23 June 2011; 14:30	Elecegui Fernandez 5	(14–12)	Janiszewska 5	Sportovní hala Vodova, Brno; Attendance: 100; Referees: Vujacic, Kazanegra (Montenegro)
23 June 2011; 14:30	2× (yellow card)	(Report)	3× (yellow card) 4× (suspension)	Sportovní hala Vodova, Brno; Attendance: 100; Referees: Vujacic, Kazanegra (Montenegro)

24 June 2011; 13:00	Poland	16 – 26	Norway	Sportovní hala Vodova, Brno; Attendance: 100; Referees: Silva, Alfonso (Portugal)
24 June 2011; 13:00	Janiszewska, Gutkowska 3	(7–13)	Oftedal 9	Sportovní hala Vodova, Brno; Attendance: 100; Referees: Silva, Alfonso (Portugal)
24 June 2011; 13:00	3× (yellow card) 3× (suspension)	(Report)	3× (yellow card) 3× (suspension)	Sportovní hala Vodova, Brno; Attendance: 100; Referees: Silva, Alfonso (Portugal)

24 June 2011; 15:00	Netherlands	35 – 31	Spain	Sportovní hala Vodova, Brno; Attendance: 100; Referees: Frieser, Frieser (Czech Republic)
24 June 2011; 15:00	Michielsen 7	(20–17)	Elecegui Fernandez 12	Sportovní hala Vodova, Brno; Attendance: 100; Referees: Frieser, Frieser (Czech Republic)
24 June 2011; 15:00	1× (yellow card) 1× (suspension)	(Report)	2× (yellow card) 1× (suspension)	Sportovní hala Vodova, Brno; Attendance: 100; Referees: Frieser, Frieser (Czech Republic)

26 June 2011; 13:00	Norway	34 – 26	Spain	Sportovní hala Vodova, Brno; Attendance: 150
26 June 2011; 13:00	Venn 9	(16–10)	Elecegui Fernandez 6	Sportovní hala Vodova, Brno; Attendance: 150
26 June 2011; 13:00	3× (yellow card) 2× (suspension)	(Report)	2× (yellow card) 2× (suspension)	Sportovní hala Vodova, Brno; Attendance: 150

26 June 2011; 15:00	Netherlands	28 - 24	Poland	Sportovní hala Vodova, Brno; Attendance: 100; Referees: Silva, Alfonso (Portugal)
26 June 2011; 15:00	Michielsen 11	(13-13)	Janiszewska 6	Sportovní hala Vodova, Brno; Attendance: 100; Referees: Silva, Alfonso (Portugal)
26 June 2011; 15:00	3× (yellow card) 7× (suspension)	(Report)	2× (yellow card) 3× (suspension)	Sportovní hala Vodova, Brno; Attendance: 100; Referees: Silva, Alfonso (Portugal)

=== Group D ===
Team	Pld	W	D	L	GF	GA	GD	Pts
Hungary	3	3	0	0	99	69	+30	6
France	3	2	0	1	81	64	+17	4
Croatia	3	1	0	2	47	65	−18	2
Slovakia	3	0	0	3	35	61	−26	0

23 June 2011; 16:30	France	27 – 21	Croatia	Sportovní hala Vodova, Brno; Attendance: 100; Referees: Frieser, Frieser (Czech Republic)
23 June 2011; 16:30	Agathe 10	(11–8)	Dragišić 8	Sportovní hala Vodova, Brno; Attendance: 100; Referees: Frieser, Frieser (Czech Republic)
23 June 2011; 16:30	3× (yellow card) 4× (suspension)	(Report)	3× (yellow card) 1× (suspension)	Sportovní hala Vodova, Brno; Attendance: 100; Referees: Frieser, Frieser (Czech Republic)

23 June 2011; 19:15	Hungary	33 – 20	Slovakia	Sportovní hala Vodova, Brno; Attendance: 100; Referees: Dimkova, Lyubenova (Bulgaria)
23 June 2011; 19:15	Korsós 6	(13–7)	Kostelná 6	Sportovní hala Vodova, Brno; Attendance: 100; Referees: Dimkova, Lyubenova (Bulgaria)
23 June 2011; 19:15	3× (yellow card) 5× (suspension)	(Report)	2× (yellow card) 2× (suspension)	Sportovní hala Vodova, Brno; Attendance: 100; Referees: Dimkova, Lyubenova (Bulgaria)

24 June 2011; 17:00	Slovakia	15 – 31	France	Sportovní hala Vodova, Brno; Attendance: 100; Referees: Vujacic, Kazanegra (Montenegro)
24 June 2011; 17:00	Kostelná 6	(10–16)	Frecon 8	Sportovní hala Vodova, Brno; Attendance: 100; Referees: Vujacic, Kazanegra (Montenegro)
24 June 2011; 17:00	2× (yellow card) 2× (suspension)	(Report)	3× (yellow card) 5× (suspension)	Sportovní hala Vodova, Brno; Attendance: 100; Referees: Vujacic, Kazanegra (Montenegro)

24 June 2011; 19:00	Croatia	26 – 38	Hungary	Sportovní hala Vodova, Brno; Attendance: 150; Referees: Nastase, Stancu (Romania)
24 June 2011; 19:00	Kuzman 5	(12–20)	Bárány 9	Sportovní hala Vodova, Brno; Attendance: 150; Referees: Nastase, Stancu (Romania)
24 June 2011; 19:00	2× (yellow card) 2× (suspension)	(Report)	3× (yellow card) 4× (suspension)	Sportovní hala Vodova, Brno; Attendance: 150; Referees: Nastase, Stancu (Romania)

26 June 2011; 17:00	France	23 – 28	Hungary	Sportovní hala Vodova, Brno; Attendance: 150; Referees: Frieser, Frieser (Czech Republic)
26 June 2011; 17:00	Agathe 4	(8–19)	Sirián 7	Sportovní hala Vodova, Brno; Attendance: 150; Referees: Frieser, Frieser (Czech Republic)
26 June 2011; 17:00	2× (yellow card) 6× (suspension) 1× (red card)	(Report)	2× (yellow card) 7× (suspension)	Sportovní hala Vodova, Brno; Attendance: 150; Referees: Frieser, Frieser (Czech Republic)

26 June 2011; 19:00	Croatia	30 – 16	Slovakia	Sportovní hala Vodova, Brno; Attendance: 100; Referees: Dimkova, Lyubenova (Bulgaria)
26 June 2011; 19:00	Dragišić 7	(16–9)	Kostelná 5	Sportovní hala Vodova, Brno; Attendance: 100; Referees: Dimkova, Lyubenova (Bulgaria)
26 June 2011; 19:00	3× (yellow card) 3× (suspension)	(Report)	2× (yellow card) 5× (suspension)	Sportovní hala Vodova, Brno; Attendance: 100; Referees: Dimkova, Lyubenova (Bulgaria)

== Intermediate round ==
=== Group I1 ===
Team	Pld	W	D	L	GF	GA	GD	Pts
Germany	3	2	1	0	89	78	+11	5
Czech Republic	3	2	1	0	82	77	+5	5
Portugal	3	1	0	2	84	86	−2	2
Austria	3	0	0	3	70	84	−14	0

28 June 2011; 13:00	Austria	22 – 25	Portugal	Sportovní hala Vodova, Brno; Attendance: 120; Referees: Prastalo, Todorovic (Bosnia and Herzegovina)
28 June 2011; 13:00	Kietaibl, Berisha 4	(13–10)	Lopes 5	Sportovní hala Vodova, Brno; Attendance: 120; Referees: Prastalo, Todorovic (Bosnia and Herzegovina)
28 June 2011; 13:00	3× (yellow card) 2× (suspension)	(Report)	3× (yellow card) 5× (suspension)	Sportovní hala Vodova, Brno; Attendance: 120; Referees: Prastalo, Todorovic (Bosnia and Herzegovina)

28 June 2011; 15:00	Germany	24 – 24	Czech Republic	Sportovní hala Vodova, Brno; Referees: Kijauskaite, Zaliene (Lithuania)
28 June 2011; 15:00	Weigel 6	(8–11)	Pokorná 7	Sportovní hala Vodova, Brno; Referees: Kijauskaite, Zaliene (Lithuania)
28 June 2011; 15:00	3× (yellow card) 4× (suspension) 1× (red card)	(Report)	3× (yellow card) 1× (suspension) 1× (red card)	Sportovní hala Vodova, Brno; Referees: Kijauskaite, Zaliene (Lithuania)

29 June 2011; 13:00	Portugal	33 – 37	Germany	Sportovní hala Vodova, Brno; Referees: Mandak, Rudinsky (Slovakia)
29 June 2011; 13:00	Lopes, Rogrigues 6	(16–21)	Putuke, Rode 7	Sportovní hala Vodova, Brno; Referees: Mandak, Rudinsky (Slovakia)
29 June 2011; 13:00	2× (yellow card) 5× (suspension)	(Report)	1× (yellow card) 3× (suspension)	Sportovní hala Vodova, Brno; Referees: Mandak, Rudinsky (Slovakia)

29 June 2011; 15:00	Austria	27 – 31	Czech Republic	Sportovní hala Vodova, Brno; Attendance: 400; Referees: Gutowska, Gutowska (Poland)
29 June 2011; 15:00	Schimon 6	(10–20)	Fryčáková 8	Sportovní hala Vodova, Brno; Attendance: 400; Referees: Gutowska, Gutowska (Poland)
29 June 2011; 15:00	3× (yellow card) 4× (suspension) 1× (red card)	(Report)	2× (yellow card) 5× (suspension)	Sportovní hala Vodova, Brno; Attendance: 400; Referees: Gutowska, Gutowska (Poland)

=== Group I2 ===
Team	Pld	W	D	L	GF	GA	GD	Pts
Croatia	3	3	0	0	89	59	+30	6
Spain	3	2	0	1	67	79	−12	4
Poland	3	1	0	2	74	74	0	2
Slovakia	3	0	0	3	62	80	−18	0

28 June 2011; 13:00	Poland	24 – 21	Slovakia	Sportovní hala Vodova, Brno; Attendance: 100; Referees: Silva, Afonso (Portugal)
28 June 2011; 13:00	Kozimur 13	(9–10)	Kostelná 5	Sportovní hala Vodova, Brno; Attendance: 100; Referees: Silva, Afonso (Portugal)
28 June 2011; 13:00	3× (yellow card) 4× (suspension)	(Report)	3× (yellow card) 7× (suspension)	Sportovní hala Vodova, Brno; Attendance: 100; Referees: Silva, Afonso (Portugal)

28 June 2011; 15:00	Spain	16 – 31	Croatia	Sportovní hala Vodova, Brno; Attendance: 130; Referees: Frieser, Frieser (Czech Republic)
28 June 2011; 15:00	Elecegui Fernandez 7	(6–17)	Vrkljan, Dragišić 7	Sportovní hala Vodova, Brno; Attendance: 130; Referees: Frieser, Frieser (Czech Republic)
28 June 2011; 15:00	2× (yellow card) 3× (suspension)	(Report)	3× (yellow card) 4× (suspension)	Sportovní hala Vodova, Brno; Attendance: 130; Referees: Frieser, Frieser (Czech Republic)

29 June 2011; 13:00	Slovakia	25 – 26	Spain	Sportovní hala Vodova, Brno; Attendance: 300; Referees: Silva, Afonso (Portugal)
29 June 2011; 13:00	Kostelná 6	(13–11)	Lopez Artuñedo, Gil de la Vega 5	Sportovní hala Vodova, Brno; Attendance: 300; Referees: Silva, Afonso (Portugal)
29 June 2011; 13:00	2× (yellow card) 2× (suspension)	(Report)	3× (yellow card) 3× (suspension)	Sportovní hala Vodova, Brno; Attendance: 300; Referees: Silva, Afonso (Portugal)

29 June 2011; 15:00	Poland	27 – 28	Croatia	Sportovní hala Vodova, Brno; Attendance: 100; Referees: Nastase, Stancu (Romania)
29 June 2011; 15:00	Kozimur, Gutkowska 6	(15–12)	Milosavljević 9	Sportovní hala Vodova, Brno; Attendance: 100; Referees: Nastase, Stancu (Romania)
29 June 2011; 15:00	2× (yellow card) 5× (suspension)	(Report)	2× (yellow card) 5× (suspension)	Sportovní hala Vodova, Brno; Attendance: 100; Referees: Nastase, Stancu (Romania)

== Main round ==
=== Group M1 ===
Team	Pld	W	D	L	GF	GA	GD	Pts
Russia	3	3	0	0	89	63	+26	6
Denmark	3	2	0	1	88	80	+8	4
Romania	3	0	1	2	75	87	−12	1
Sweden	3	0	1	2	59	81	−22	1

28 June 2011; 17:00	Sweden	24 – 24	Romania	Sportovní Hala Euronics, Zlín; Referees: Vujacic, Kazanegra (Montenegro)
28 June 2011; 17:00	Mässing 5	(14–11)	Pricopi 8	Sportovní Hala Euronics, Zlín; Referees: Vujacic, Kazanegra (Montenegro)
28 June 2011; 17:00	3× (yellow card) 7× (suspension)	(Report)	2× (yellow card) 3× (suspension)	Sportovní Hala Euronics, Zlín; Referees: Vujacic, Kazanegra (Montenegro)

28 June 2011; 19:00	Russia	31 – 26	Denmark	Sportovní Hala Euronics, Zlín; Referees: Mandak, Rudinsky (Slovakia)
28 June 2011; 19:00	Vyakhireva 8	(16–13)	Hansen 10	Sportovní Hala Euronics, Zlín; Referees: Mandak, Rudinsky (Slovakia)
28 June 2011; 19:00	3× (yellow card) 8× (suspension) 1× (red card)	(Report)	2× (yellow card) 4× (suspension)	Sportovní Hala Euronics, Zlín; Referees: Mandak, Rudinsky (Slovakia)

29 June 2011; 17:00	Romania	26 – 32	Russia	Sportovní Hala Euronics, Zlín; Attendance: 300; Referees: Frieser, Frieser (Czech Republic)
29 June 2011; 17:00	Perianu 8	(14–14)	Bogdanova 8	Sportovní Hala Euronics, Zlín; Attendance: 300; Referees: Frieser, Frieser (Czech Republic)
29 June 2011; 17:00	3× (yellow card) 8× (suspension)	(Report)	1× (yellow card) 5× (suspension)	Sportovní Hala Euronics, Zlín; Attendance: 300; Referees: Frieser, Frieser (Czech Republic)

29 June 2011; 19:00	Sweden	24 – 31	Denmark	Sportovní Hala Euronics, Zlín; Attendance: 350; Referees: Crnojevic, Kostecki Radic (Croatia)
29 June 2011; 19:00	Petrén 7	(8–15)	Meyer 5	Sportovní Hala Euronics, Zlín; Attendance: 350; Referees: Crnojevic, Kostecki Radic (Croatia)
29 June 2011; 19:00	3× (yellow card) 6× (suspension)	(Report)	2× (yellow card) 1× (suspension)	Sportovní Hala Euronics, Zlín; Attendance: 350; Referees: Crnojevic, Kostecki Radic (Croatia)

=== Group M2 ===
Team	Pld	W	D	L	GF	GA	GD	Pts
Norway	3	3	0	0	89	81	+8	6
Hungary	3	2	0	1	84	79	+5	4
Netherlands	3	1	0	2	90	89	+1	2
France	3	0	0	3	65	79	−14	0

28 June 2011; 17:00	Netherlands	29 – 21	France	Sportovní hala Vodova, Brno; Attendance: 200; Referees: Nastase, Stancu (Romania)
28 June 2011; 17:00	Wilmsen 7	(13–13)	Frecon 9	Sportovní hala Vodova, Brno; Attendance: 200; Referees: Nastase, Stancu (Romania)
28 June 2011; 17:00	3× (yellow card) 7× (suspension)	(Report)	1× (yellow card) 6× (suspension)	Sportovní hala Vodova, Brno; Attendance: 200; Referees: Nastase, Stancu (Romania)

28 June 2011; 19:00	Norway	28 – 27	Hungary	Sportovní hala Vodova, Brno; Attendance: 200; Referees: Crnojevic, Kostecki Radic (Croatia)
28 June 2011; 19:00	Oftedal 7	(14–14)	Szekerczés 7	Sportovní hala Vodova, Brno; Attendance: 200; Referees: Crnojevic, Kostecki Radic (Croatia)
28 June 2011; 19:00	2× (yellow card) 6× (suspension)	(Report)	2× (yellow card) 2× (suspension)	Sportovní hala Vodova, Brno; Attendance: 200; Referees: Crnojevic, Kostecki Radic (Croatia)

29 June 2011; 17:00	France	21 – 22	Norway	Sportovní hala Vodova, Brno; Attendance: 600; Referees: Kijauskaite, Zaliene (Lithuania)
29 June 2011; 17:00	Frecon 4	(8–11)	Venn 4	Sportovní hala Vodova, Brno; Attendance: 600; Referees: Kijauskaite, Zaliene (Lithuania)
29 June 2011; 17:00	3× (yellow card) 4× (suspension)	(Report)	3× (yellow card) 2× (suspension)	Sportovní hala Vodova, Brno; Attendance: 600; Referees: Kijauskaite, Zaliene (Lithuania)

29 June 2011; 19:00	Netherlands	28 – 29	Hungary	Sportovní hala Vodova, Brno; Attendance: 250; Referees: Vujacic, Kazanegra (Montenegro)
29 June 2011; 19:00	Michielsen 12	(16–15)	Tóth 12	Sportovní hala Vodova, Brno; Attendance: 250; Referees: Vujacic, Kazanegra (Montenegro)
29 June 2011; 19:00	2× (yellow card) 3× (suspension)	(Report)	3× (yellow card) 5× (suspension)	Sportovní hala Vodova, Brno; Attendance: 250; Referees: Vujacic, Kazanegra (Montenegro)

== Placement round 13–16 ==
=== Bracket ===
Cross matches
1 July 2011 – Zlín
Portugal	32
Slovakia	24
1 July 2011 – Zlín
Poland	24
Austria	33

13th place final
2 July 2011 – Zlín
Portugal	31
Austria	28
15th place final
2 July 2011 – Zlín
Slovakia	23
Poland	31

=== Cross matches ===
1 July 2011; 13:00	Portugal	32 – 24	Slovakia	Sportovní Hala Euronics, Zlín; Attendance: 100; Referees: Prastalo, Todorovic (Bosnia and Herzegovina)
1 July 2011; 13:00	Costa 10	(17–12)	Königová, Spaková 6	Sportovní Hala Euronics, Zlín; Attendance: 100; Referees: Prastalo, Todorovic (Bosnia and Herzegovina)
1 July 2011; 13:00	3× (yellow card) 1× (suspension)	(Report)	3× (yellow card) 3× (suspension)	Sportovní Hala Euronics, Zlín; Attendance: 100; Referees: Prastalo, Todorovic (Bosnia and Herzegovina)

1 July 2011; 15:00	Poland	24 – 33	Austria	Sportovní Hala Euronics, Zlín; Attendance: 90; Referees: Vujacic, Kazanegra (Montenegro)
1 July 2011; 15:00	Kozimur 7	(15–15)	Berisha 8	Sportovní Hala Euronics, Zlín; Attendance: 90; Referees: Vujacic, Kazanegra (Montenegro)
1 July 2011; 15:00	2× (yellow card) 4× (suspension)	(Report)	3× (yellow card) 6× (suspension)	Sportovní Hala Euronics, Zlín; Attendance: 90; Referees: Vujacic, Kazanegra (Montenegro)

=== 15th place final ===
2 July 2011; 13:00	Slovakia	23 – 31	Poland	Sportovní Hala Euronics, Zlín; Attendance: 60; Referees: Prastalo, Todorovic (Bosnia and Herzegovina)
2 July 2011; 13:00	Klučková 7	(8–17)	Gutkowska, Tomczyk 7	Sportovní Hala Euronics, Zlín; Attendance: 60; Referees: Prastalo, Todorovic (Bosnia and Herzegovina)
2 July 2011; 13:00	3× (yellow card) 2× (suspension)	(Report)	3× (yellow card) 4× (suspension)	Sportovní Hala Euronics, Zlín; Attendance: 60; Referees: Prastalo, Todorovic (Bosnia and Herzegovina)

=== 13th place final ===
2 July 2011; 15:00	Portugal	31 – 28	Austria	Sportovní Hala Euronics, Zlín; Attendance: 200; Referees: Nastase, Stancu (Romania)
2 July 2011; 15:00	Faleiro, Soares 7	(15–14)	Berisha 8	Sportovní Hala Euronics, Zlín; Attendance: 200; Referees: Nastase, Stancu (Romania)
2 July 2011; 15:00	2× (yellow card) 8× (suspension)	(Report)	2× (yellow card) 6× (suspension)	Sportovní Hala Euronics, Zlín; Attendance: 200; Referees: Nastase, Stancu (Romania)

== Placement round 9–12 ==
=== Bracket ===
Cross matches
1 July 2011 – Zlín
Germany	31
Spain	27
1 July 2011 – Zlín
Croatia	29
Czech Republic	26

9th place final
2 July 2011 – Zlín
Germany	25
Croatia	30
11th place final
2 July 2011 – Zlín
Spain	21
Czech Republic	20

=== Cross matches ===
1 July 2011; 18:00	Germany	31 – 27	Spain	Sportovní Hala Euronics, Zlín; Attendance: 300; Referees: Nastase, Stancu (Romania)
1 July 2011; 18:00	Putzke 6	(20–11)	Elecegui Fernandez 10	Sportovní Hala Euronics, Zlín; Attendance: 300; Referees: Nastase, Stancu (Romania)
1 July 2011; 18:00	3× (yellow card) 5× (suspension)	(Report)	3× (yellow card) 7× (suspension)	Sportovní Hala Euronics, Zlín; Attendance: 300; Referees: Nastase, Stancu (Romania)

1 July 2011; 20:30	Croatia	29 – 26	Czech Republic	Sportovní Hala Euronics, Zlín; Attendance: 250; Referees: Silva, Afonso (Portugal)
1 July 2011; 20:30	Dragišić, Milosavljević 6	(17–15)	Jačková, Malá 6	Sportovní Hala Euronics, Zlín; Attendance: 250; Referees: Silva, Afonso (Portugal)
1 July 2011; 20:30	2× (yellow card) 4× (suspension) 1× (red card)	(Report)	3× (yellow card) 3× (suspension)	Sportovní Hala Euronics, Zlín; Attendance: 250; Referees: Silva, Afonso (Portugal)

=== 11th place final ===
2 July 2011; 18:00	Spain	21 – 20	Czech Republic	Sportovní Hala Euronics, Zlín; Attendance: 500; Referees: Vujacic, Kazanegra (Montenegro)
2 July 2011; 18:00	Elecegui Fernandez 5	(9–9)	Malá 6	Sportovní Hala Euronics, Zlín; Attendance: 500; Referees: Vujacic, Kazanegra (Montenegro)
2 July 2011; 18:00	3× (yellow card) 3× (suspension)	(Report)	2× (yellow card) 2× (suspension)	Sportovní Hala Euronics, Zlín; Attendance: 500; Referees: Vujacic, Kazanegra (Montenegro)

=== 9th place final ===
2 July 2011; 20:30	Germany	25 – 30	Croatia	Sportovní Hala Euronics, Zlín; Attendance: 100; Referees: Gutowska, Gutowska (Poland)
2 July 2011; 20:30	Schombel 6	(12–12)	Dragišić 7	Sportovní Hala Euronics, Zlín; Attendance: 100; Referees: Gutowska, Gutowska (Poland)
2 July 2011; 20:30	3× (yellow card) 3× (suspension)	(Report)	2× (yellow card) 4× (suspension) 1× (red card)	Sportovní Hala Euronics, Zlín; Attendance: 100; Referees: Gutowska, Gutowska (Poland)

== Placement round 5–8 ==
=== Bracket ===
Cross matches
1 July 2011 – Brno
Romania	26
France	27
1 July 2011 – Brno
Netherlands	26
Sweden	30

5th place final
3 July 2011 – Brno
France	20
Sweden	18
7th place final
3 July 2011 – Brno
Romania	35
Netherlands	29

=== Cross matches ===
1 July 2011; 13:00	Romania	26 – 27	France	Sportovní hala Vodova, Brno; Attendance: 100; Referees: Crnojevic, Kostecki Radic (Croatia)
1 July 2011; 13:00	Safta 8	(13–10)	Agathe 10	Sportovní hala Vodova, Brno; Attendance: 100; Referees: Crnojevic, Kostecki Radic (Croatia)
1 July 2011; 13:00	2× (yellow card) 6× (suspension)	(Report)	3× (yellow card) 4× (suspension) 1× (red card)	Sportovní hala Vodova, Brno; Attendance: 100; Referees: Crnojevic, Kostecki Radic (Croatia)

1 July 2011; 15:30	Netherlands	26 – 30	Sweden	Sportovní hala Vodova, Brno; Attendance: 150; Referees: Kijauskaite, Zaliene (Lithuania)
1 July 2011; 15:30	Michielsen 7	(13–12)	Petrén 9	Sportovní hala Vodova, Brno; Attendance: 150; Referees: Kijauskaite, Zaliene (Lithuania)
1 July 2011; 15:30	3× (yellow card) 6× (suspension)	(Report)	3× (yellow card) 5× (suspension) 1× (red card)	Sportovní hala Vodova, Brno; Attendance: 150; Referees: Kijauskaite, Zaliene (Lithuania)

=== 7th place final ===
3 July 2011; 12:30	Romania	35 – 29	Netherlands	Sportovní hala Vodova, Brno; Attendance: 210; Referees: Frieser, Frieser (Czech Republic)
3 July 2011; 12:30	Perianu 8	(9–9)	Michielsen 7	Sportovní hala Vodova, Brno; Attendance: 210; Referees: Frieser, Frieser (Czech Republic)
3 July 2011; 12:30	3× (yellow card) 3× (suspension)	(Report)	3× (yellow card) 2× (suspension) 1× (red card)	Sportovní hala Vodova, Brno; Attendance: 210; Referees: Frieser, Frieser (Czech Republic)

=== 5th place final ===
3 July 2011; 12:30	France	20 – 18	Sweden	Sportovní hala Vodova, Brno; Attendance: 100; Referees: Nastase, Stancu (Romania)
3 July 2011; 12:30	Frecon 8	(12–11)	Petrén, Gustin 4	Sportovní hala Vodova, Brno; Attendance: 100; Referees: Nastase, Stancu (Romania)
3 July 2011; 12:30	2× (yellow card) 1× (suspension)	(Report)	3× (yellow card) 2× (suspension) 1× (red card)	Sportovní hala Vodova, Brno; Attendance: 100; Referees: Nastase, Stancu (Romania)

== Final round ==
=== Bracket ===
Semifinals
1 July 2011 – Brno
Russia	24
Hungary	22
1 July 2011 – Brno
Norway	22
Denmark	29

Final
3 July 2011 – Brno
Russia	24
Denmark	23
Bronze medal match
3 July 2011 – Brno
Hungary	16
Norway	28

=== Semifinals ===
1 July 2011; 18:00	Russia	24 – 22	Hungary	Sportovní hala Vodova, Brno; Attendance: 400; Referees: Mandak, Rudinsky (Slovakia)
1 July 2011; 18:00	Denikaeva, Vedekhina, Vyakhireva 4	(14–10)	Tóth 7	Sportovní hala Vodova, Brno; Attendance: 400; Referees: Mandak, Rudinsky (Slovakia)
1 July 2011; 18:00	2× (yellow card) 4× (suspension)	(Report)	3× (yellow card) 8× (suspension)	Sportovní hala Vodova, Brno; Attendance: 400; Referees: Mandak, Rudinsky (Slovakia)

1 July 2011; 20:30	Norway	22 – 29	Denmark	Sportovní hala Vodova, Brno; Attendance: 300; Referees: Frieser, Frieser (Czech Republic)
1 July 2011; 20:30	Bjaaland, Oftedal 5	(11–18)	Jensen 8	Sportovní hala Vodova, Brno; Attendance: 300; Referees: Frieser, Frieser (Czech Republic)
1 July 2011; 20:30	3× (yellow card) 2× (suspension)	(Report)	1× (yellow card) 2× (suspension)	Sportovní hala Vodova, Brno; Attendance: 300; Referees: Frieser, Frieser (Czech Republic)

=== Bronze medal match ===
3 July 2011; 15:00	Hungary	16 – 28	Norway	Sportovní hala Vodova, Brno; Attendance: 1,000; Referees: Vujacic, Kazanegra (Montenegro)
3 July 2011; 15:00	Tóth 5	(12–12)	Oftedal 7	Sportovní hala Vodova, Brno; Attendance: 1,000; Referees: Vujacic, Kazanegra (Montenegro)
3 July 2011; 15:00	3× (yellow card) 5× (suspension) 1× (red card)	(Report)	3× (yellow card) 3× (suspension)	Sportovní hala Vodova, Brno; Attendance: 1,000; Referees: Vujacic, Kazanegra (Montenegro)

=== Final ===
3 July 2011; 17:30	Russia	24 – 23	Denmark	Sportovní hala Vodova, Brno; Attendance: 700; Referees: Crnojevic, Kostecki Radic (Croatia)
3 July 2011; 17:30	Denikaeva, Ikhneva, Vyakhireva 4	(14–11)	Larsen 5	Sportovní hala Vodova, Brno; Attendance: 700; Referees: Crnojevic, Kostecki Radic (Croatia)
3 July 2011; 17:30	2× (yellow card) 4× (suspension)	(Report)	3× (yellow card) 6× (suspension) 1× (red card)	Sportovní hala Vodova, Brno; Attendance: 700; Referees: Crnojevic, Kostecki Radic (Croatia)

== Rankings and awardees ==
=== Final ranking ===
Gold medal	Russia
Silver medal	Denmark
Bronze medal	Norway
4	Hungary
5	France
6	Sweden
7	Romania
8	Netherlands
9	Croatia
10	Germany
11	Spain
12	Czech Republic
13	Portugal
14	Austria
15	Poland
16	Slovakia

Teams that are advanced to the 2012 Women's Youth World Handball Championship are highlighted with green.

2011 European Champions

Russia

=== All-Star Team ===
- Goalkeeper: Evelina Anoshkina (RUS)
- Left Wing: Kristin Venn (NOR)
- Left Back: Gabriela Perianu (ROU)
- Playmaker: Nadia Offendal (DEN)
- Pivot: Celine Michielsen (NED)
- Right Back: Nadja Lærke Jensen (DEN)
- Right Wing: Anna Vyakhireva (RUS)

=== Other awards ===
- Top Scorer: Celine Michielsen (NED)
- Best Defence Player: Polina Vedekhina (RUS)
- Most Valuable Player: Nadia Offendal (DEN)

Source: "All-stars team". euro2011.cz.
