= Michał Janiszewski =

Michał Janiszewski may refer to:

- Michał Janiszewski (politician, born 1926) (1926–2016), Polish officer and public official
- Michał Janiszewski (politician, born 1954) (1954–2025), Polish politician
