= Ekaterina Litvnova =

Russian handball player

Personal information
- Full name: Ekaterina Vladimirovna Litvnova
- Nationality: Russian
- Born: 18 January 1994 (age 32) Tolyatti, Russia
- Height: 1.71 m (5 ft 7 in)

Sport
- Sport: Handball
- Position: Left wing
- Current club: Dinamo Volgograd
- Number: 2

Senior clubs
- Years: Team
- 2011-: Dinamo Volgograd
National team
- Years: Team
- –: Russia
Medal record
World Junior Championship
| Silver medal – second place | 2014 Croatia |
World Youth Championship
| Silver medal – second place | 2012 Montenegro |
European Junior Championship
| Gold medal – first place | 2013 Denmark |
European Youth Championship
| Gold medal – first place | 2011 Czech Republic |

Ekaterina Vladimirovna Litvnova (Russian: Екатерина Владимировна Литвинова) (née Chernova; born 18 January 1994) is a Russian female handball player for Dinamo Volgograd and the Russian national team.

She also represented Russia in the 2011 European Women's Youth Handball Championship and in the 2014 Women's Junior World Handball Championship, where she received gold and silver.

== Achievements ==
- Russian Super League
  - Gold Medalist: 2012, 2013, 2014
- EHF Champions League:
  - Fourth place: 2014/15
- World Junior Championship:
  - Silver Medalist: 2014
- European Junior Championship:
  - Gold Medalist: 2013
- World Youth Championship:
  - Silver Medalist: 2012
- European Youth Championship:
  - Gold Medalist: 2011

== Individual awards ==
- All-Star Left wing of the Junior World Championship: 2012
- All-Star Left wing of the European Junior Championship: 2013
