= Janiszewski =

Janiszewski (feminine Janiszewska) is a Polish surname. Notable people with the surname include:

- Barbara Sobotta-Janiszewska (1936–2000), Polish athlete
- Guy Janiszewski (born 1959), Belgian racing cyclist
- Halina Janiszewska (1909–2006), Polish social and political activist
- Henryk Janiszewski (born 1949), Polish ice hockey player
- Jerzy Janiszewski (born 1952), Polish artist
- Jill Janus (née Janiszewski; 1975–2018), American heavy metal singer
- Katarzyna Janiszewska (born 1995), Polish handball player
- Michał Janiszewski (politician, born 1926) (1926–2016), Polish officer and public official
- Michał Janiszewski (politician, born 1954) (1954–2025), Polish politician
- Robert C. Janiszewski (born 1945), American politician
- Sylwester Janiszewski (born 1988), Polish racing cyclist
- Zygmunt Janiszewski (1888–1920), Polish mathematician
