= Hanna Oftedal Sagosen =

Norwegian handball player (born 1994)

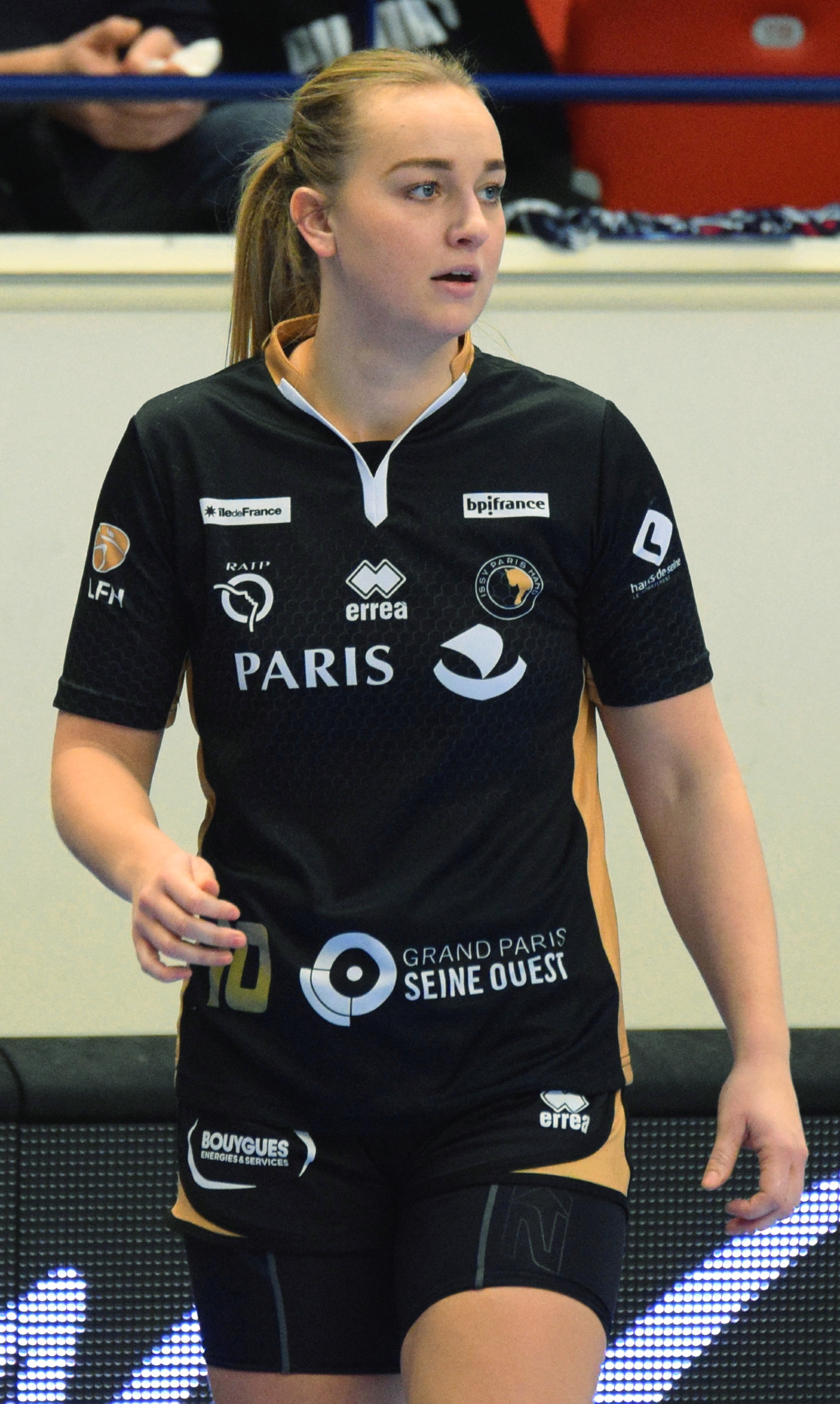
- Bredal Oftedal in 2018

Personal information
- Nationality: Norwegian
- Born: Hanna Bredal Oftedal; 4 July 1994 (age 32) Nittedal, Norway
- Height: 1.75 m (5 ft 9 in)

Sport
- Sport: Handball
- Position: Right back
- Current club: Retired

Senior clubs
- Years: Team
- 2010–2011: Helset
- 2011–2014: Stabæk IF
- 2014–2019: Issy-Paris Hand
- 09/2019-11/2019: Silkeborg-Voel KFUM
National team
Years	Team	Apps	(Gls)
2017	Norway	2	(1)
Medal record
Youth World Championship
Bronze medal – third place	2012 Montenegro
Youth European Championship
Bronze medal – third place	2011 Czech Republic

Hanna Oftedal Sagosen (née Bredal Oftedal, born 4 July 1994) is a former Norwegian handball player, who last played for Silkeborg-Voel KFUM. She also represented Norway in the 2013 Women's Junior European Handball Championship, placing 4th, and in the 2014 Women's Junior World Handball Championship, placing 9th.

In November 2019 she announced her retirement, due to serious injury.

== Personal life ==
She is a younger sister of Stine Bredal Oftedal.

She is married to fellow handballer Sander Sagosen. Their first child, son Noah, was born on July 13, 2023.

== Achievements ==
- Youth European Championship:
  - Bronze Medalist: 2011
- World Youth Championship:
  - Bronze Medalist: 2012

== Individual awards ==
- All-Star Right Back of the U18 European Open: 2012
- French Championship Hope of the Season: 2015
