= Annika Meyer =

Danish handball player (born 1994)

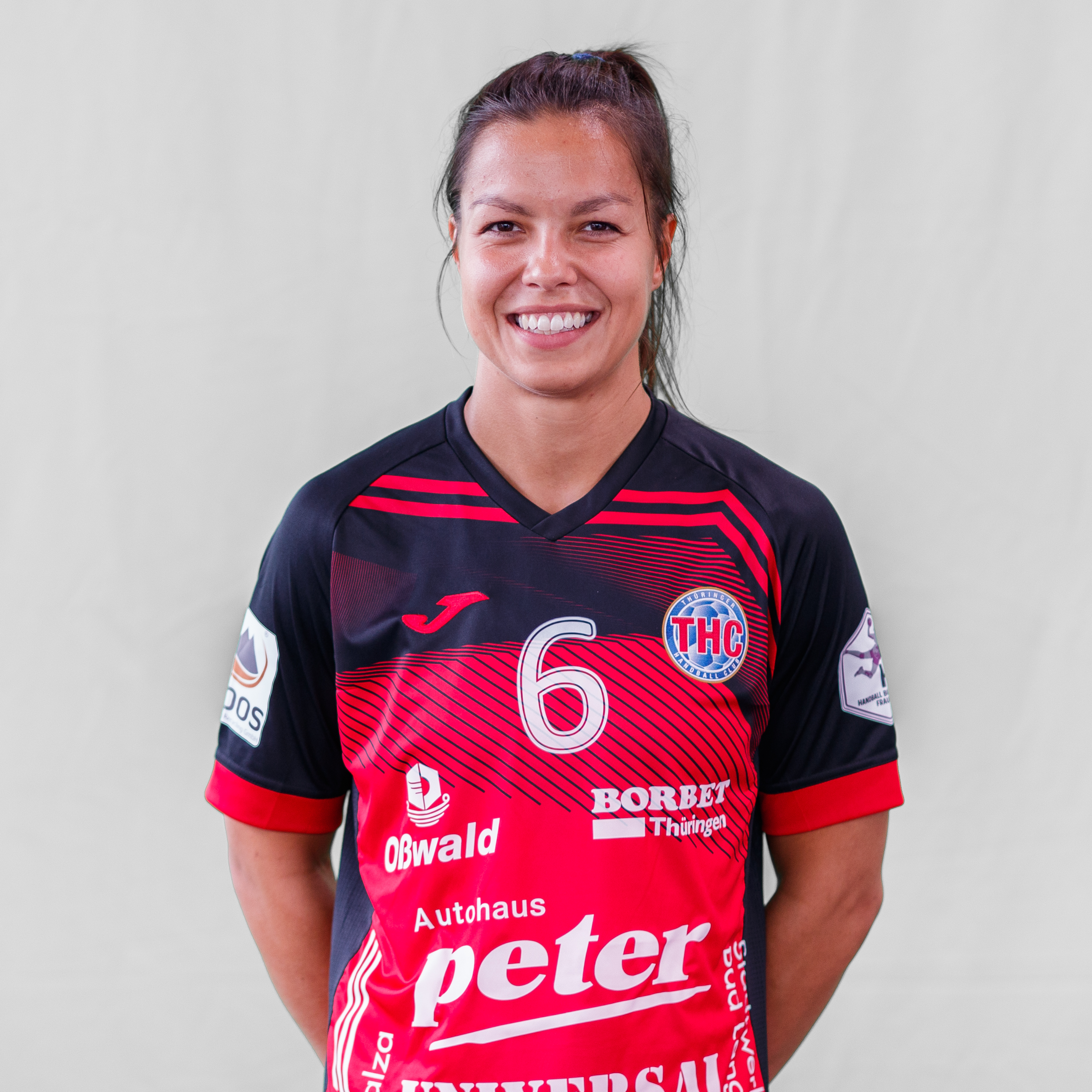

Personal information
- Full name: Annika Meyer
- Nationality: Danish
- Born: 30 May 1994 (age 32) Haderslev, Denmark
- Height: 1.77 m (5 ft 10 in)

Sport
- Sport: Handball
- Position: Line player
- Current club: SG BBM Bietigheim
- Number: 6

Senior clubs
- Years: Team
- –2012: SønderjyskE Håndbold
- 2012–2013: Odense Håndbold
- 2013–2016: VfL Oldenburg
- 2016–2017: Buxtehuder SV
- 2017–2019: København Håndbold
- 2019–2021: Aarhus United
- 2021–2022: Thüringer HC
- 2022–2023: SG BBM Bietigheim
- 2023–: HH Elite
Medal record
IHF Junior World Championship
Bronze medal – third place	2014 Croatia
IHF Youth World Championship
Gold medal – first place	2012 Montenegro
European Junior Championship
Bronze medal – third place	2013 Denmark
European Youth Championship
Silver medal – second place	2011 Czech Republic

Annika Meyer (born 30 May 1994) is a Danish handball player who currently plays for HH Elite.

Her family belongs to the German minority in Denmark.

== Career ==
Meyer started in the youth ranks of SønderjyskE Håndbold. In 2012 she joined HC Odense.

After the 2013–14 season she joined German side VfL Oldenburg. In 2016-17 she joined Buxtehuder SV. Here she won the 2017 DHB-Pokal.

The following summer she returned to Denmark and joined København Håndbold. Here she won the 2017-18 Danish Championship, the first ever in club history.

In 2019 she joined Aarhus United.

In 2021 she returned to Germany and signed for Thüringer HC. A year later she joined league rivals SG BBM Bietigheim. Here she won the League and Cup double in her only season at the club.

In 2023 she joined Danish side HH Elite.

== National team ==
Meyer played for various Danish youth national teams. In 2012 she won the U18 World Championship with the Danish team. At the U19 European Championship in 2013 she won bronze medals. For the tournament she was part of the all star team as the best defender.

In 2014 she finished 3rd at the U18 World Championship.
