= Gabriela Perianu =

Romanian handball player (born 1994)

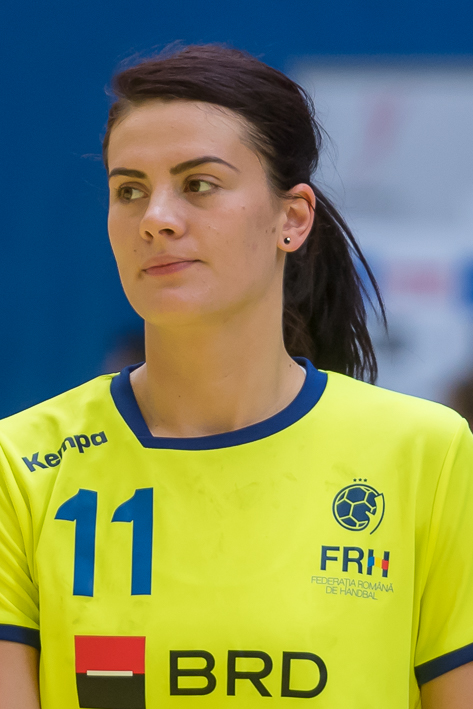

Personal information
- Nationality: Romanian
- Born: 20 June 1994 (age 32) Brăila, Romania
- Height: 1.88 m (6 ft 2 in)

Sport
- Sport: Handball
- Position: Left back
- Current club: Rapid Bucuresti
- Number: 11

Youth career
- Years: Team
- 2000–2011: LPS Brăila

Senior clubs
- Years: Team
- 2011–2017: HC Dunărea Brăila
- 2015–2016: → HCM Baia Mare (loan)
- 2017–2019: Siófok KC
- 2019–2021: CSM București
- 2021–2023: Rapid
National team
Years	Team	Apps	(Gls)
2012–	Romania	65	(96)
Medal record
World Championship
Bronze medal – third place	2015 Denmark
World University Championship
Silver medal – second place	2016 Spain

Gabriela Perianu (born 20 June 1994) is a Romanian handballer for CSM București and the Romanian national team.

== Achievements ==
- Liga Naţională:
  - Silver Medalist: 2016, 2017
  - Bronze Medalist: 2014
- Cupa României:
  - Bronze Medalist: 2016
- Supercupa României:
  - Winner: 2015
- Nemzeti Bajnokság I:
  - Bronze Medalist: 2019
- EHF Cup:
  - Winner: 2019
- World Championship:
  - Bronze Medalist: 2015
- World University Championship:
  - Silver Medalist: 2016

== Awards and recognition ==
- All-Star Left Back of the World Youth Championship: 2012
- All-Star Left Back of the European Youth Championship: 2011
- Brăila County Sportswoman of the Year: 2011
- Best Defender of the Bucharest Trophy: 2015
