= Irina Snopova =

Russian handball player (born 1995)

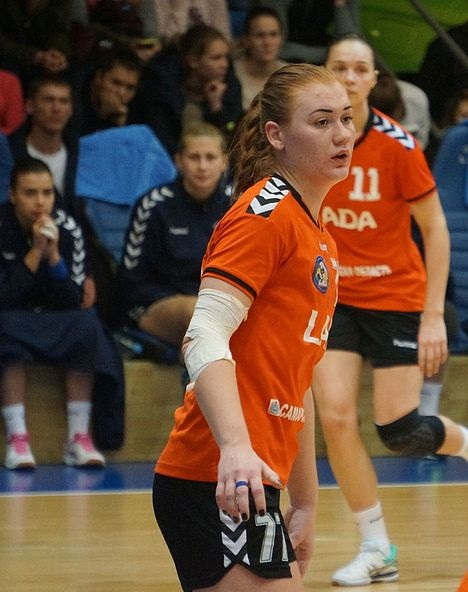

Personal information
- Nationality: Russian
- Born: 7 June 1995 (age 31) Volgograd, Russia
- Height: 1.82 m (6 ft 0 in)

Sport
- Sport: Handball
- Position: Right back
- Current club: HC Astrakhanochka
- Number: 87

Senior clubs
- Years: Team
- 2012–2016: HC Astrakhanochka
- 2016–2018: HC Lada
- 2018–: HC Astrakhanochka
National team
Years	Team	Apps	(Gls)
2018–	Russia	14	(6)
Medal record
European Championship
Silver medal – second place	2018 France
Youth World Championship
Silver medal – second place	2012 Montenegro

Irina Snopova (born 7 June 1995) is a Russian handball player for HC Astrakhanochka and the Russian national team.

== International honours ==
- EHF Cup:
  - Semifinalist: 2014
- Youth World Championship:
  - Silver Medalist: 2012
