= Kristin Venn =

Norwegian handball player (born 1994)

Personal information
- Nationality: Norwegian
- Born: 5 March 1994 (age 32) Trondheim, Norway
- Height: 1.68 m (5 ft 6 in)

Sport
- Sport: Handball
- Position: Left wing
- Current club: Storhamar HE
- Number: 10

Senior clubs
- Years: Team
- –: Skaun HK
- –2013: Utleira IL
- 2013–2018: Byåsen HE
- 2018–: Storhamar HE
National team
| Years | Team | Apps | (Gls) |
| 2017– | Norway | 11 | (26) |
Medal record
Youth World Championship
| Bronze medal – third place | 2012 Montenegro |
Youth European Championship
| Bronze medal – third place | 2011 Czech Republic |

Kristin Venn (born 5 March 1994) is a Norwegian handball player who plays for the Norwegian club Storhamar HE.

She was also a part of Norway's 28-squad for the 2015 World Women's Handball Championship as well as the 28-squad for the 2014 European Women's Handball Championship. She has already participated for Norway's recruit team.

She also represented Norway in 2014 Women's Junior World Handball Championship, placing 9th.

On 4 October 2017, Venn announced that she would not play anymore for the national team. She was going to focus on playing for her then club Byåsen HE and just enjoy playing handball. She later opened up for the possibility to fight for a spot on the national team, and national team coach Thorir Hergeirsson said Venn was up for a place in the squad for the 2022 European Championship had she not been injured. This was also the case when Ole Gustav Gjekstad took over: Had she not been injured again she would have gotten a spot in the squad for the 2025 World Championship.

On 24 October 2024 Venn made a comeback, 7 years and 4 months since her last performance for the national team.

== Achievements ==
- Youth European Championship:
  - Bronze Medalist: 2011
- Youth World Championship:
  - Bronze Medalist: 2012
- EHF European League:
  - Winner: 2023/2024
- Norwegian League
  - Gold: 2024/2025
  - Silver: 2020/2021, 2021/2022, 2022/2023, 2023/2024, 2025/2026
- Norwegian Cup:
  - Winner: 2024, 2025
  - Finalist: 2018, 2019, 2023/2024

== Individual awards ==
- All-Star Left Wing of the Youth European Championship: 2011
- All-Star Left Wing of the U18 European Open: 2012
- All-Star Left Wing of Eliteserien: 2018/2019, 2022/2023
