= Nicoleta Balog =

Romanian handballer (born 1994)

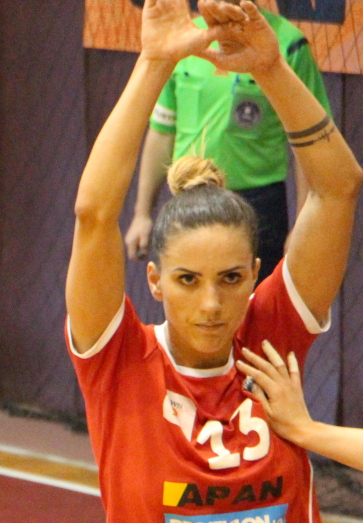

Personal information
- Born: 17 November 1994 (age 31) Râmnicu Vâlcea, Romania
- Height: 1.80 m (5 ft 11 in)

Sport
- Sport: Handball
- Position: Line Player
- Current club: Dunărea Brăila

Senior clubs
- Years: Team
- 2012-2013: CS Oltchim Râmnicu Vâlcea
- loan: → U Jolidon Cluj
- 2013-2015: HC Dunărea Brăila
- 2015-2016: HC Alba Sebeș
- 2016-2017: HCM Râmnicu Vâlcea
- 2017-2018: CSM Galați
- 2018-: Dunărea Brăila
- Updated on 11 October 2012

Nicoleta Balog (née Safta; born 17 November 1994, in Râmnicu Vâlcea) is a Romanian handballer who plays for Dunărea Brăila.

In 2012, she participated at the 2012 Women's Junior World Handball Championship in the Czech Republic and the 2012 Women's Youth World Handball Championship in Montenegro.

== International honours ==
- EHF Champions League:
  - Semifinalist: 2012, 2013
