= Emilie Hegh Arntzen =

Norwegian handball player (born 1994)

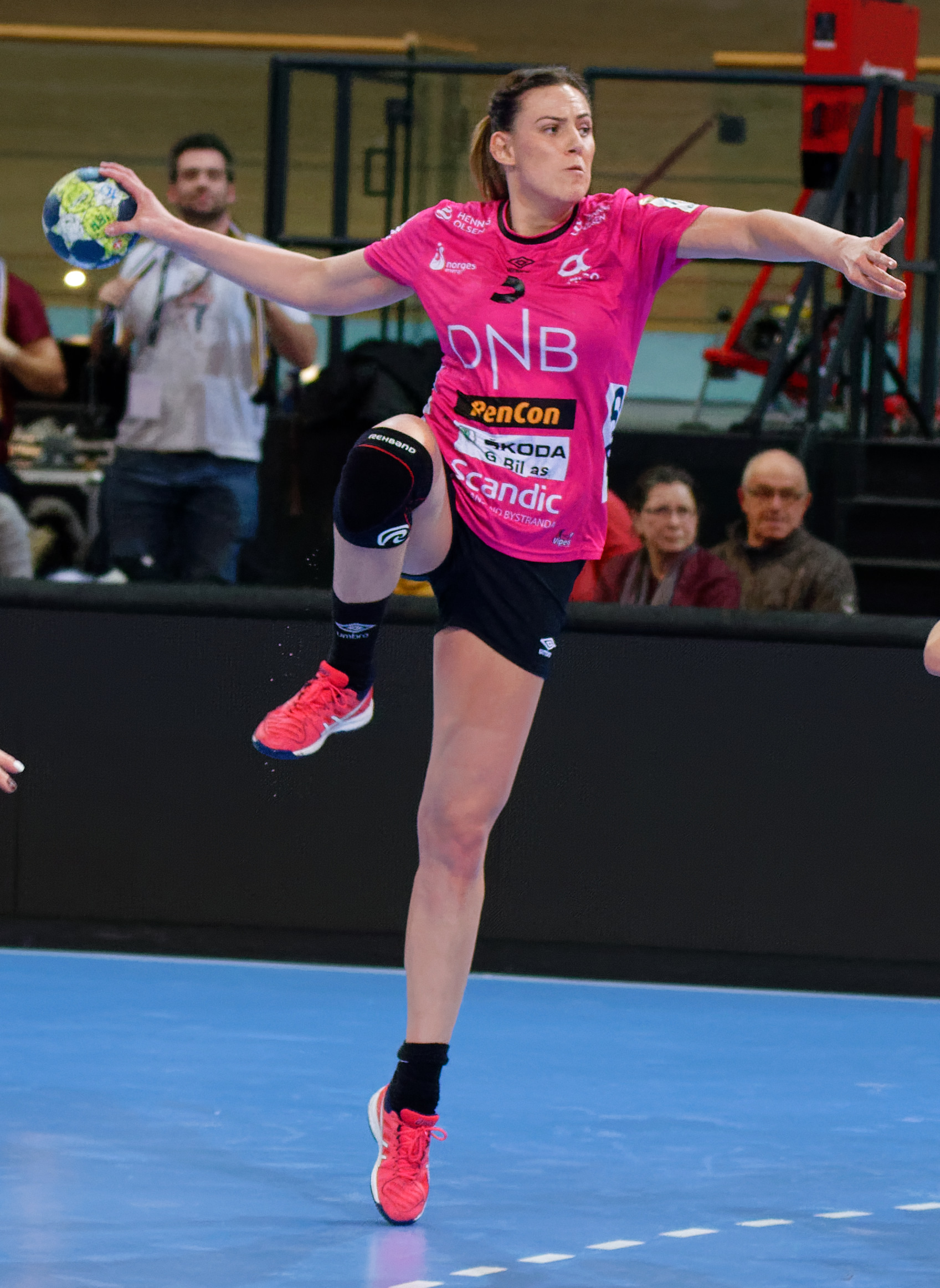
- Hegh Arntzen in 2018

Personal information
- Nationality: Norwegian
- Born: 1 January 1994 (age 32) Skien, Norway
- Height: 1.84 m (6 ft 0 in)

Sport
- Sport: Handball
- Position: Left back
- Current club: SCM Râmnicu Vâlcea
- Number: 5

Senior clubs
- Years: Team
- 2010–2014: Gjerpen IF
- 2014–2017: Byåsen HE
- 2017–2021: Vipers Kristiansand
- 2021–2025: CSM București
- 2025–2026: Ikast Håndbold
- 2026–: SCM Râmnicu Vâlcea
National team
Years	Team	Apps	(Gls)
2014–2023	Norway	155	(237)
Medal record
Olympic Games
Bronze medal – third place	2016 Rio de Janeiro	Team
World Championship
Gold medal – first place	2021 Spain
Silver medal – second place	2017 Germany
European Championship
Gold medal – first place	2014 Croatia/Hungary
Gold medal – first place	2016 Sweden
Gold medal – first place	2020 Denmark
Gold medal – first place	2022 Slovenia/North Macedonia/Montenegro
Youth World Championship
Bronze medal – third place	2012 Montenegro
Youth European Championship
Bronze medal – third place	2011 Czech Republic

Emilie Hegh Arntzen (born 1 January 1994) is a Norwegian handball player for SCM Râmnicu Vâlcea and a former player on the Norwegian national team.

Her achievements include one victory in the Women's EHF Champions League as club player, one Olympic bronze medal, one gold and one silver medal at the IHF World Women's Handball Championships, and four times European champion.

== Career ==
=== Club career ===
As youth player, Hegh Arntzen represented the clubs Stord HK, Herkules and Gulset IF. At senior level she played for Gjerpen IF from 2010 to 2014. From 2014 to 2017 she represented the club Byåsen IL, and then Vipers Kristiansand from 2017 to 2021. With Vipers, she won the Norwegian League four times, in the seasons 2017/2018, 2018/2019, 2019/2020, and 2020/2021, as well as winning the Norwegian Cup four times. With Vipers, she also won the 2020–21 Women's EHF Champions League.

She started playing for CSM București from 2021.

=== National team ===
Hegh Arntzen made her debut on the national team in 2014.

Her achievements with the national team include winning a gold medal at the 2021 World Women's Handball Championship, having won a silver medal in 2017. She also won a bronze medal at the 2016 Summer Olympics, and became European champion in 2014, 2016, 2020 and 2022.

She also represented Norway in the 2013 Women's Junior European Handball Championship, placing 4th, and in the 2014 Women's Junior World Handball Championship, placing 9th.

== Personal life ==
Hegh Arntzen was born in Skien on 1 January 1994. She is the daughter of former international handballer Hanne Hegh and handball player and coach Ketil Arntzen.

== Achievements ==
- Olympic Games:
  - Bronze Medalist: 2016
- World Championship:
  - Gold Medalist: 2021
  - Silver Medalist: 2017
- European Championship:
  - Winner: 2014, 2016, 2020, 2022
- World Youth Championship:
  - Bronze Medalist: 2012
- Youth European Championship:
  - Bronze Medalist: 2011
- EHF Champions League:
  - Winner: 2020/2021
  - Bronze medalist: 2018/2019
- EHF Cup:
  - Finalist: 2018
- Romanian Cup:
  - Winner: 2022
- Romanian Supercup:
  - Winner: 2022
  - Finalist: 2021
- Norwegian League:
  - Winner: 2017/2018, 2018/2019, 2019/2020, 2020/2021
- Norwegian Cup:
  - Winner: 2017, 2018, 2019, 2020

== Individual awards ==
- MVP of the 2022 Romanian Cup
- Best Centre Back in the month of September 2016, Grundigligaen 2016/2017
