= Haruno Sasaki =

Japanese handball player (born 1995)

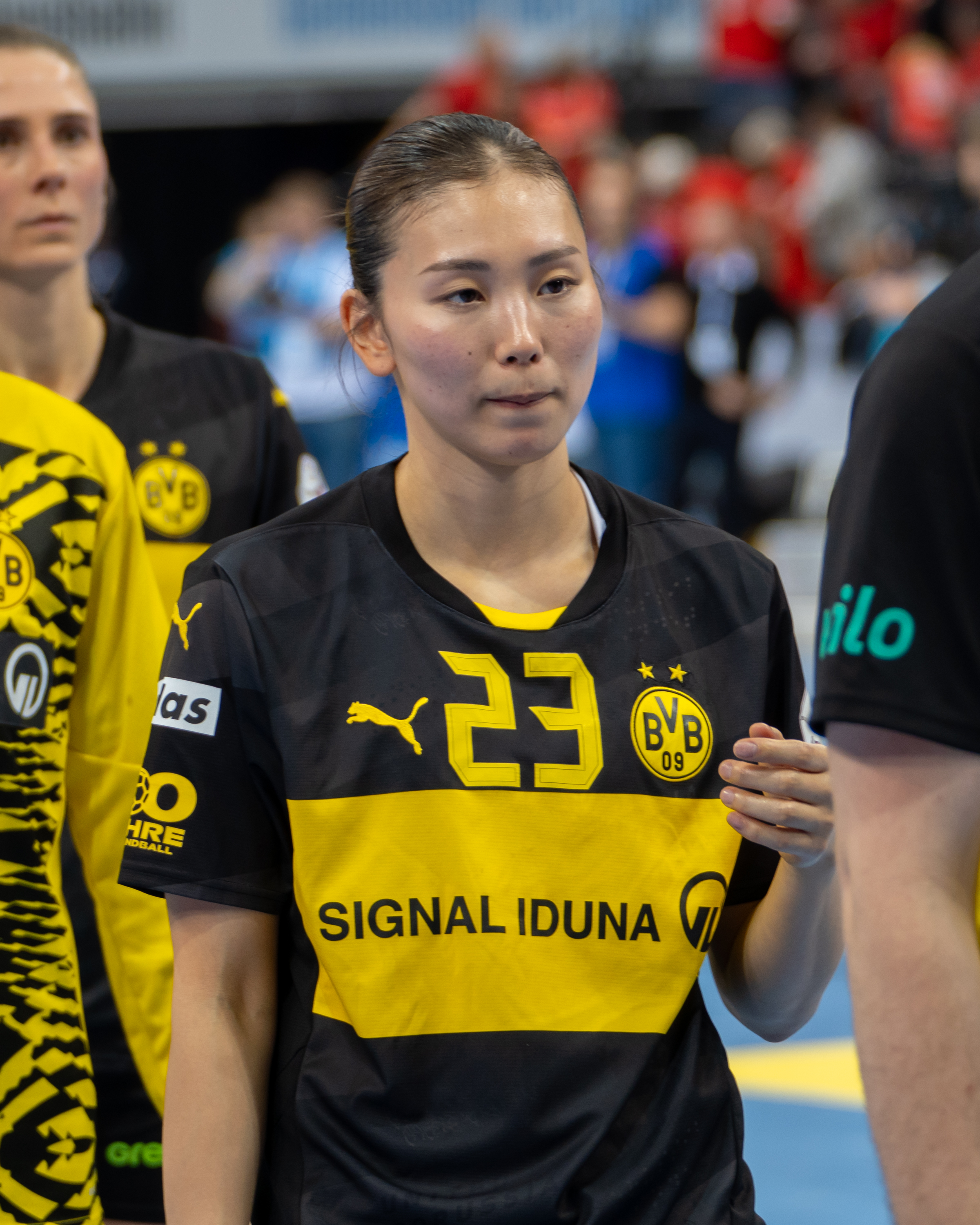

Personal information
- Nationality: Japanese
- Born: 26 February 1995 (age 31) Toyama, Japan
- Height: 1.72 m (5 ft 8 in)

Sport
- Sport: Handball
- Position: Left back
- Current club: Frisch Auf Göppingen
- Number: 32

Senior clubs
- Years: Team
- -2021: Hokkoku Bank
- 2021-2025: Borussia Dortmund Handball
- 2025-: Frisch Auf Göppingen
National team
Years	Team	Apps	(Gls)
–	Japan	63	(172)
Medal record
Women's handball
Representing Japan
Asian Games
Silver medal – second place	2026 Aichi–Nagoya	Team
Asian Championship
Gold medal – first place	2024 India
Silver medal – second place	2022 South Korea
- Updated on 26 October 2025

Haruno Sasaki (佐々木 春乃, Sasaki Haruno; born 26 February 1995) is a Japanese handball player for Borussia Dortmund Handball and the Japanese national team.

== National team ==
She participated at the 2017 and 2019 World Championships. She also represented Japan at the 2020 Olympics at home.

At the 2022 Asian Championship, she won silver medals, losing to South Korea in the final. In the final, she was the Japanese top scorer with 7 goals.

At the 2023 World Championship she was part of the Japanese team that finished 17th.

At the 2024 Asian Championship she won gold medals with the Japanese team.

She represented Japan again at the 2025 World Championship.
