= Mikaela Mässing =

Swedish handball player (born 1994)

Personal information
- Nationality: Swedish
- Born: 13 March 1994 (age 32) Mölndal, Sweden
- Height: 1.88 m (6 ft 2 in)

Sport
- Sport: Handball
- Position: Left back
- Current club: Alingsås HK

Senior clubs
- Years: Team
- 2014–2019: H 65 Höör
- 2019–2020: Thüringer HC
- 2020–2021: Minaur Baia Mare
- 2021–2022: København Håndbold
- 02/2023–: Alingsås HK
National team
Years	Team	Apps	(Gls)
2018–2022	Sweden	29	(99)

Mikaela Mässing (born 13 March 1994) is a Swedish handballer, who plays for Alingsås HK and the Swedish national team.

In 2022 she announced she was taking a break from handball due to a long term knee injury, and then made a comeback in 2023 in the lower division Swedish club Alingsås HK.

== International achievements ==
- Challenge Cup:
  - Finalist: 2017

== Individual awards ==
- MVP of the Swedish League: 2019
