= Katarzyna Portasińska =

Polish handball player (born 1995)

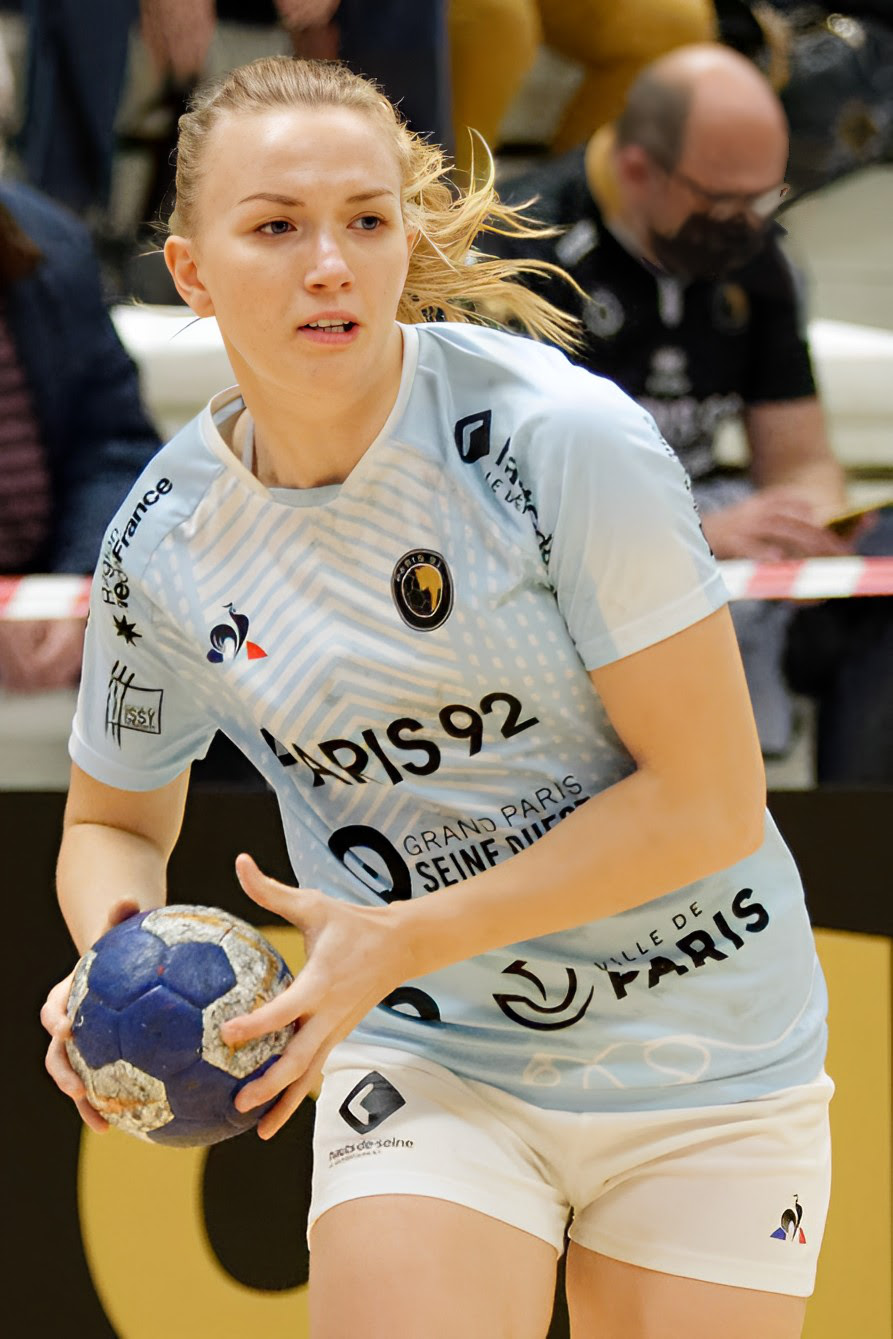
- Katarzyna Janiszewska (2020)

Personal information
- Nationality: Polish
- Born: 26 October 1995 (age 30) Sztum, Poland
- Height: 1.68 m (5 ft 6 in)

Sport
- Sport: Handball
- Position: Right wing
- Current club: Viborg HK
- Number: 95

Senior clubs
- Years: Team
- -2018: GTPR Gdynia
- 2018-2019: SV Union Halle-Neustadt
- 2019-2020: TuS Metzingen
- 2020-2021: Paris 92
- 2021-2023: MKS Lublin
- 2023-2024: Viborg HK
National team
Years	Team	Apps	(Gls)
2014-	Poland	73	(159)
- Updated on 16 August 2024

Katarzyna Portasińska (née Janiszewska born 26 October 1995) is a Polish handball player for Danish club Viborg HK and the Polish national team.

== Career ==
Portasińska played for GTPR Gdynia until 2018. Here she won the Polish championship in 2017 and the Polish cup in 2014, 2015 and 2016. In 2018 she joined German team SV Union Halle-Neustadt, which had just been promoted to the Bundesliga. She played there for a season, where she was relegated to the 2. Bundesliga. She then joined TuS Metzingen in the Bundesliga. A year later she joined French side Paris 92. After a season in France she returned to Poland, where she joined MKS Lublin. In 2023 she joined Danish side Viborg HK.

== International honours ==
- Carpathian Trophy:
  - Winner: 2017
