= 2012 Women's Youth World Handball Championship =

Tournament details
- Host country: Montenegro
- Venues: 2 (in 2 host cities)
- Dates: 16–26 August
- Teams: 20 (from 4 confederations)

Final positions
- Champions: Denmark (2nd title)
- Runners-up: Russia
- Third place: Norway
- Fourth place: Romania

Tournament statistics
- Matches played: 64
- Goals scored: 3,535 (55.23 per match)
- Attendance: 13,256 (207 per match)
- Top scorers: (Kazakhstan) Irina Alexandrova (62 goals)

Awards
- Best player: (Russia) Anna Vyakhireva

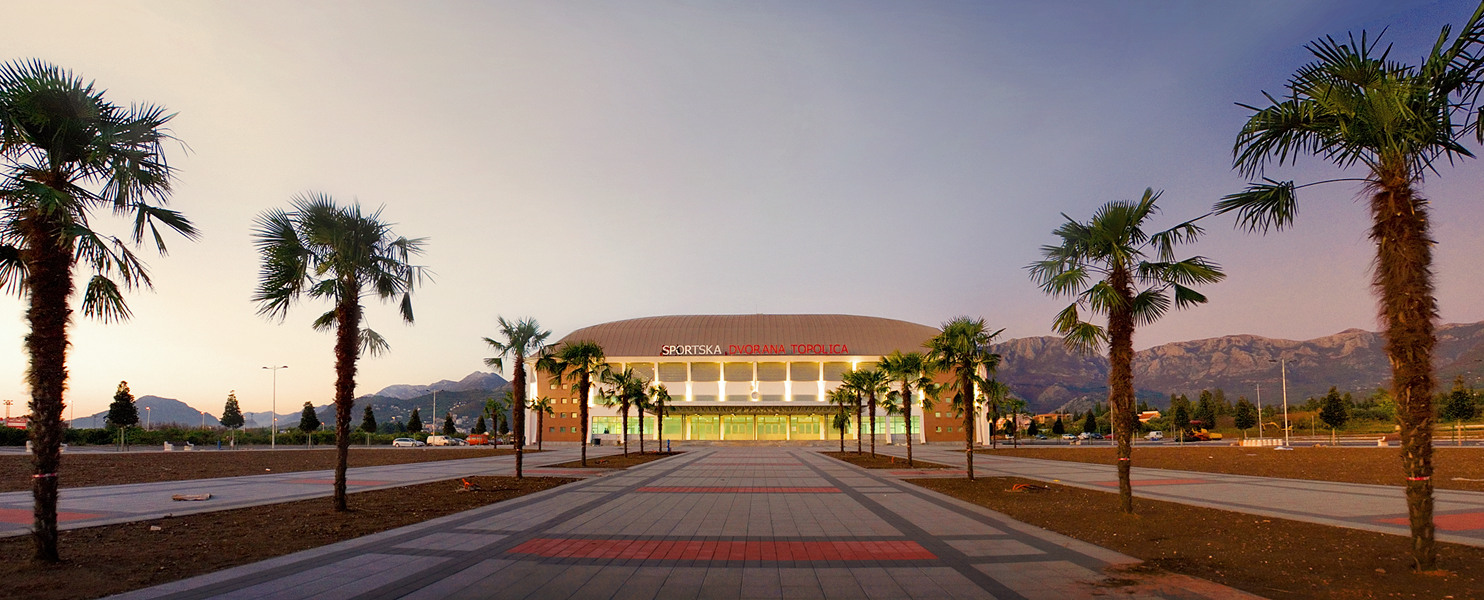
Sportska Dvorana Topolica in Sportski Centar

The 2012 Women's Youth World Handball Championship was the 4th edition of the tournament and took place in the Montenegro from 16 to 26 August 2012.

Denmark won the final against Russia by 27–26.

== Preliminary round ==
The draw was held on 23 May 2012 in Basel, Switzerland. The match schedule was released on 10 July.

All times are local (UTC+2)

=== Group A ===
Team	Pld	W	D	L	GF	GA	GD	Pts
Hungary	4	3	1	0	119	72	+47	7
Sweden	4	3	0	1	101	91	+10	6
Netherlands	4	1	2	1	108	99	+9	4
Croatia	4	1	1	2	115	116	−1	3
Paraguay	4	0	0	4	66	131	−65	0

16 August 2012; 13:45	Sweden	30 – 29	Croatia	Morača Sports Center, Podgorica; Attendance: 100; Referees: Fonseca, Santos (POR)
16 August 2012; 13:45	Gustin 10	(12–14)	Tvorić 12	Morača Sports Center, Podgorica; Attendance: 100; Referees: Fonseca, Santos (POR)
16 August 2012; 13:45	4× (yellow card) 5× (suspension)	Report	4× (yellow card) 6× (suspension)	Morača Sports Center, Podgorica; Attendance: 100; Referees: Fonseca, Santos (POR)

16 August 2012; 16:00	Netherlands	33 – 17	Paraguay	Morača Sports Center, Podgorica; Attendance: 100; Referees: Ravisević, Raznatović (MNE)
16 August 2012; 16:00	Smits, Michielsen 5	(15–6)	Aluan 7	Morača Sports Center, Podgorica; Attendance: 100; Referees: Ravisević, Raznatović (MNE)
16 August 2012; 16:00	3× (yellow card) 2× (suspension)	Report	2× (yellow card) 4× (suspension)	Morača Sports Center, Podgorica; Attendance: 100; Referees: Ravisević, Raznatović (MNE)

17 August 2012; 13:45	Hungary	38 – 24	Croatia	Morača Sports Center, Podgorica; Attendance: 100; Referees: Kulik, Nabokau (BLR)
17 August 2012; 13:45	Korsós 8	(20–11)	Mičijević 11	Morača Sports Center, Podgorica; Attendance: 100; Referees: Kulik, Nabokau (BLR)
17 August 2012; 13:45	2× (yellow card) 7× (suspension)	Report	3× (yellow card) 5× (suspension)	Morača Sports Center, Podgorica; Attendance: 100; Referees: Kulik, Nabokau (BLR)

17 August 2012; 16:00	Paraguay	19 – 29	Sweden	Morača Sports Center, Podgorica; Attendance: 100; Referees: Kupa, Mobati (COD)
17 August 2012; 16:00	Acuña 7	(12–18)	four players 4	Morača Sports Center, Podgorica; Attendance: 100; Referees: Kupa, Mobati (COD)
17 August 2012; 16:00	3× (yellow card) 4× (suspension)	Report	3× (yellow card) 3× (suspension)	Morača Sports Center, Podgorica; Attendance: 100; Referees: Kupa, Mobati (COD)

18 August 2012; 18:15	Netherlands	24 – 24	Hungary	Morača Sports Center, Podgorica; Attendance: 100; Referees: Liu, Liu (CHN)
18 August 2012; 18:15	Michielsen, Dulfer 5	(16–15)	Szekerczés 8	Morača Sports Center, Podgorica; Attendance: 100; Referees: Liu, Liu (CHN)
18 August 2012; 18:15	3× (yellow card) 5× (suspension)	Report	2× (yellow card) 3× (suspension)	Morača Sports Center, Podgorica; Attendance: 100; Referees: Liu, Liu (CHN)

19 August 2012; 13:45	Sweden	29 – 22	Netherlands	Morača Sports Center, Podgorica; Attendance: 100; Referees: Pavisević, Raznatović (MNE)
19 August 2012; 13:45	Eriksson 7	(17–11)	Smits 5	Morača Sports Center, Podgorica; Attendance: 100; Referees: Pavisević, Raznatović (MNE)
19 August 2012; 13:45	3× (yellow card) 6× (suspension)	Report	2× (yellow card) 4× (suspension) 1× (red card)	Morača Sports Center, Podgorica; Attendance: 100; Referees: Pavisević, Raznatović (MNE)

19 August 2012; 16:00	Croatia	33 – 17	Paraguay	Morača Sports Center, Podgorica; Attendance: 100; Referees: Boualloucha, Khenissi (TUN)
19 August 2012; 16:00	Milosavljević 5	(18–8)	three players 4	Morača Sports Center, Podgorica; Attendance: 100; Referees: Boualloucha, Khenissi (TUN)
19 August 2012; 16:00	3× (yellow card) 3× (suspension)	Report	2× (yellow card) 3× (suspension)	Morača Sports Center, Podgorica; Attendance: 100; Referees: Boualloucha, Khenissi (TUN)

20 August 2012; 18:15	Paraguay	11 – 36	Hungary	Morača Sports Center, Podgorica; Attendance: 100; Referees: Liu, Liu (CHN)
20 August 2012; 18:15	Aluan 4	(5–18)	Ertl 6	Morača Sports Center, Podgorica; Attendance: 100; Referees: Liu, Liu (CHN)
20 August 2012; 18:15	3× (yellow card) 5× (suspension)	Report	3× (yellow card) 9× (suspension)	Morača Sports Center, Podgorica; Attendance: 100; Referees: Liu, Liu (CHN)

21 August 2012; 13:45	Hungary	21 – 13	Sweden	Morača Sports Center, Podgorica; Referees: Fonseca, Santos (POR)
21 August 2012; 13:45	Szekerczés 8	(10–5)	Sundberg 5	Morača Sports Center, Podgorica; Referees: Fonseca, Santos (POR)
21 August 2012; 13:45	3× (yellow card) 6× (suspension)	Report	3× (yellow card) 3× (suspension)	Morača Sports Center, Podgorica; Referees: Fonseca, Santos (POR)

21 August 2012; 16:00	Croatia	29 – 29	Netherlands	Morača Sports Center, Podgorica; Attendance: 200; Referees: Boualloucha, Khenissi (TUN)
21 August 2012; 16:00	Tvorić 9	(14–13)	Pavkovic 8	Morača Sports Center, Podgorica; Attendance: 200; Referees: Boualloucha, Khenissi (TUN)
21 August 2012; 16:00	4× (yellow card) 3× (suspension)	Report	3× (yellow card) 4× (suspension)	Morača Sports Center, Podgorica; Attendance: 200; Referees: Boualloucha, Khenissi (TUN)

=== Group B ===
Team	Pld	W	D	L	GF	GA	GD	Pts
Russia	4	4	0	0	152	98	+54	8
Romania	4	3	0	1	132	95	+37	6
Montenegro	4	2	0	2	115	114	+1	4
Kazakhstan	4	0	1	3	92	141	−49	1
DR Congo	4	0	1	3	81	133	−52	1

16 August 2012; 18:15	Romania	39 – 14	DR Congo	Sportska Dvorana Topolica, Bar; Attendance: 500; Referees: Crnojević, Kostecki (CRO)
16 August 2012; 18:15	Safta 7	(18–3)	Kalume 6	Sportska Dvorana Topolica, Bar; Attendance: 500; Referees: Crnojević, Kostecki (CRO)
16 August 2012; 18:15	3× (yellow card) 5× (suspension)	Report	2× (yellow card) 6× (suspension)	Sportska Dvorana Topolica, Bar; Attendance: 500; Referees: Crnojević, Kostecki (CRO)

16 August 2012; 20:30	Montenegro	37 – 26	Kazakhstan	Sportska Dvorana Topolica, Bar; Referees: Brkic, Jusufhodzic (AUT)
16 August 2012; 20:30	Stojanović 6	(22–13)	Alexandrova 13	Sportska Dvorana Topolica, Bar; Referees: Brkic, Jusufhodzic (AUT)
16 August 2012; 20:30	3× (yellow card) 5× (suspension)	Report	2× (yellow card) 2× (suspension)	Sportska Dvorana Topolica, Bar; Referees: Brkic, Jusufhodzic (AUT)

17 August 2012; 18:15	Russia	40 – 16	DR Congo	Sportska Dvorana Topolica, Bar; Attendance: 200; Referees: Guzman, Perez (PUR)
17 August 2012; 18:15	Bogdanova 6	(22–9)	Kalume 5	Sportska Dvorana Topolica, Bar; Attendance: 200; Referees: Guzman, Perez (PUR)
17 August 2012; 18:15	3× (yellow card) 1× (suspension)	Report	4× (yellow card) 4× (suspension)	Sportska Dvorana Topolica, Bar; Attendance: 200; Referees: Guzman, Perez (PUR)

17 August 2012; 20:30	Kazakhstan	22 – 41	Romania	Sportska Dvorana Topolica, Bar; Attendance: 200; Referees: Allade, Dagba (BEN)
17 August 2012; 20:30	Baigabylova 5	(12–24)	Tănasie 9	Sportska Dvorana Topolica, Bar; Attendance: 200; Referees: Allade, Dagba (BEN)
17 August 2012; 20:30	2× (yellow card)	Report	3× (yellow card) 1× (suspension)	Sportska Dvorana Topolica, Bar; Attendance: 200; Referees: Allade, Dagba (BEN)

18 August 2012; 20:30	Montenegro	29 – 39	Russia	Sportska Dvorana Topolica, Bar; Attendance: 500; Referees: Bethman, Tsaferopoulos (GRE)
18 August 2012; 20:30	Despotović 7	(11–22)	Snopova 7	Sportska Dvorana Topolica, Bar; Attendance: 500; Referees: Bethman, Tsaferopoulos (GRE)
18 August 2012; 20:30	3× (yellow card) 6× (suspension)	Report	3× (yellow card) 5× (suspension)	Sportska Dvorana Topolica, Bar; Attendance: 500; Referees: Bethman, Tsaferopoulos (GRE)

19 August 2012; 18:15	DR Congo	27 – 27	Kazakhstan	Sportska Dvorana Topolica, Bar; Attendance: 100; Referees: Engberg, Delle (SWE)
19 August 2012; 18:15	Ndampia 8	(10–15)	Alexandrova 13	Sportska Dvorana Topolica, Bar; Attendance: 100; Referees: Engberg, Delle (SWE)
19 August 2012; 18:15	3× (yellow card) 4× (suspension)	Report	2× (yellow card) 2× (suspension)	Sportska Dvorana Topolica, Bar; Attendance: 100; Referees: Engberg, Delle (SWE)

19 August 2012; 20:30	Romania	25 – 22	Montenegro	Sportska Dvorana Topolica, Bar; Referees: Koo, Lee (KOR)
19 August 2012; 20:30	Pricopi 10	(9–14)	Despotović 7	Sportska Dvorana Topolica, Bar; Referees: Koo, Lee (KOR)
19 August 2012; 20:30	3× (yellow card) 4× (suspension)	Report	3× (yellow card) 4× (suspension)	Sportska Dvorana Topolica, Bar; Referees: Koo, Lee (KOR)

20 August 2012; 18:15	Kazakhstan	17 – 36	Russia	Sportska Dvorana Topolica, Bar; Attendance: 100; Referees: Allade, Dagba (BEN)
20 August 2012; 18:15	Alexandrova 10	(10–20)	Matlashova 7	Sportska Dvorana Topolica, Bar; Attendance: 100; Referees: Allade, Dagba (BEN)
20 August 2012; 18:15	2× (yellow card)	Report	3× (yellow card) 2× (suspension)	Sportska Dvorana Topolica, Bar; Attendance: 100; Referees: Allade, Dagba (BEN)

21 August 2012; 18:15	Russia	37 – 27	Romania	Sportska Dvorana Topolica, Bar; Attendance: 400; Referees: Bethmann, Tzaferopoulos (GRE)
21 August 2012; 18:15	Dmitrieva 8	(17–18)	Safta 7	Sportska Dvorana Topolica, Bar; Attendance: 400; Referees: Bethmann, Tzaferopoulos (GRE)
21 August 2012; 18:15	3× (yellow card) 3× (suspension)	Report	3× (yellow card) 4× (suspension)	Sportska Dvorana Topolica, Bar; Attendance: 400; Referees: Bethmann, Tzaferopoulos (GRE)

21 August 2012; 20:30	DR Congo	24 – 27	Montenegro	Sportska Dvorana Topolica, Bar; Attendance: 200; Referees: Engberg, Delle (SWE)
21 August 2012; 20:30	Betu 9	(16–11)	Despotović 9	Sportska Dvorana Topolica, Bar; Attendance: 200; Referees: Engberg, Delle (SWE)
21 August 2012; 20:30	3× (yellow card) 3× (suspension)	Report	3× (yellow card) 6× (suspension)	Sportska Dvorana Topolica, Bar; Attendance: 200; Referees: Engberg, Delle (SWE)

=== Group C ===
Team	Pld	W	D	L	GF	GA	GD	Pts
Denmark	4	3	1	0	125	83	+42	7
France	4	3	1	0	131	99	+32	7
South Korea	4	2	0	2	123	119	+4	4
Czech Republic	4	0	1	3	85	111	−26	1
Uruguay	4	0	1	3	106	139	−33	1

16 August 2012; 18:15	France	38 – 21	Uruguay	Morača Sports Center, Podgorica; Attendance: 135; Referees: Liu, Liu (CHN)
16 August 2012; 18:15	Soulard 6	(24–9)	Scarrone 6	Morača Sports Center, Podgorica; Attendance: 135; Referees: Liu, Liu (CHN)
16 August 2012; 18:15	3× (yellow card) 2× (suspension)	Report	4× (yellow card) 3× (suspension)	Morača Sports Center, Podgorica; Attendance: 135; Referees: Liu, Liu (CHN)

16 August 2012; 20:30	South Korea	29 – 25	Czech Republic	Morača Sports Center, Podgorica; Attendance: 121; Referees: Kupa, Mobati (COD)
16 August 2012; 20:30	Kim Su-jeong 8	(16–13)	Fryčáková 6	Morača Sports Center, Podgorica; Attendance: 121; Referees: Kupa, Mobati (COD)
16 August 2012; 20:30	3× (yellow card) 3× (suspension)	Report	2× (yellow card) 2× (suspension)	Morača Sports Center, Podgorica; Attendance: 121; Referees: Kupa, Mobati (COD)

17 August 2012; 18:15	Denmark	29 – 13	Uruguay	Morača Sports Center, Podgorica; Attendance: 100; Referees: Boualloucha, Khenissi (TUN)
17 August 2012; 18:15	Offendal, Nielsen 5	(14–8)	Barreiro 4	Morača Sports Center, Podgorica; Attendance: 100; Referees: Boualloucha, Khenissi (TUN)
17 August 2012; 18:15	4× (yellow card) 4× (suspension)	Report	2× (yellow card) 3× (suspension)	Morača Sports Center, Podgorica; Attendance: 100; Referees: Boualloucha, Khenissi (TUN)

17 August 2012; 20:30	Czech Republic	18 – 26	France	Morača Sports Center, Podgorica; Referees: Pavisević, Raznatović (MNE)
17 August 2012; 20:30	three players 4	(12–14)	Agathe 5	Morača Sports Center, Podgorica; Referees: Pavisević, Raznatović (MNE)
17 August 2012; 20:30	2× (yellow card) 2× (suspension)	Report	3× (yellow card) 2× (suspension)	Morača Sports Center, Podgorica; Referees: Pavisević, Raznatović (MNE)

18 August 2012; 20:30	South Korea	21 – 33	Denmark	Morača Sports Center, Podgorica; Attendance: 100; Referees: Santos, Fonseca (POR)
18 August 2012; 20:30	Shin Min-ji 7	(8–16)	Olsen 7	Morača Sports Center, Podgorica; Attendance: 100; Referees: Santos, Fonseca (POR)
18 August 2012; 20:30	2× (yellow card) 5× (suspension)	Report	3× (yellow card) 4× (suspension)	Morača Sports Center, Podgorica; Attendance: 100; Referees: Santos, Fonseca (POR)

19 August 2012; 18:15	France	34 – 27	South Korea	Morača Sports Center, Podgorica; Attendance: 200; Referees: Kulik, Nabokau (BLR)
19 August 2012; 18:15	Agathe 13	(17–16)	Kim Su-jeong 9	Morača Sports Center, Podgorica; Attendance: 200; Referees: Kulik, Nabokau (BLR)
19 August 2012; 18:15	3× (yellow card) 10× (suspension)	Report	3× (yellow card) 6× (suspension)	Morača Sports Center, Podgorica; Attendance: 200; Referees: Kulik, Nabokau (BLR)

19 August 2012; 20:30	Uruguay	26 – 26	Czech Republic	Morača Sports Center, Podgorica; Referees: Liu, Liu (CHN)
19 August 2012; 20:30	Scarrone 10	(12–12)	Pokorná 7	Morača Sports Center, Podgorica; Referees: Liu, Liu (CHN)
19 August 2012; 20:30	3× (yellow card) 4× (suspension)	Report	3× (yellow card) 3× (suspension)	Morača Sports Center, Podgorica; Referees: Liu, Liu (CHN)

20 August 2012; 20:30	Czech Republic	16 – 30	Denmark	Morača Sports Center, Podgorica; Referees: Santos, Fonseca (POR)
20 August 2012; 20:30	Pokorná, Jerabková 4	(10–13)	Kyndbal 5	Morača Sports Center, Podgorica; Referees: Santos, Fonseca (POR)
20 August 2012; 20:30	2× (yellow card) 3× (suspension)	Report	3× (yellow card) 2× (suspension)	Morača Sports Center, Podgorica; Referees: Santos, Fonseca (POR)

21 August 2012; 18:15	Denmark	33 – 33	France	Morača Sports Center, Podgorica; Attendance: 200; Referees: Pavisević, Raznatović (MNE)
21 August 2012; 18:15	Kyndbal, Jensen 8	(14–17)	Agathe 10	Morača Sports Center, Podgorica; Attendance: 200; Referees: Pavisević, Raznatović (MNE)
21 August 2012; 18:15	2× (yellow card) 1× (suspension)	Report	4× (yellow card) 6× (suspension)	Morača Sports Center, Podgorica; Attendance: 200; Referees: Pavisević, Raznatović (MNE)

21 August 2012; 20:30	Uruguay	37 – 46	South Korea	Morača Sports Center, Podgorica; Attendance: 100; Referees: Kulik, Nabokau (BLR)
21 August 2012; 20:30	Scarrone 14	(19–21)	Kim Su-jeong 9	Morača Sports Center, Podgorica; Attendance: 100; Referees: Kulik, Nabokau (BLR)
21 August 2012; 20:30	4× (yellow card) 3× (suspension)	Report	2× (yellow card) 3× (suspension)	Morača Sports Center, Podgorica; Attendance: 100; Referees: Kulik, Nabokau (BLR)

=== Group D ===
Team	Pld	W	D	L	GF	GA	GD	Pts
Norway	4	4	0	0	146	75	+71	8
Japan	4	3	0	1	117	101	+16	6
Brazil	4	2	0	2	91	111	−20	4
Angola	4	1	0	3	92	124	−32	2
Portugal	4	0	0	4	106	131	−25	0

16 August 2012; 13:45	Brazil	26 – 29	Japan	Sportska Dvorana Topolica, Bar; Attendance: 200; Referees: Bethmann, Tzaferopoulos (GRE)
16 August 2012; 13:45	Morcineck 8	(10–18)	Sasaki 10	Sportska Dvorana Topolica, Bar; Attendance: 200; Referees: Bethmann, Tzaferopoulos (GRE)
16 August 2012; 13:45	3× (yellow card) 2× (suspension)	Report	3× (yellow card)	Sportska Dvorana Topolica, Bar; Attendance: 200; Referees: Bethmann, Tzaferopoulos (GRE)

16 August 2012; 16:00	Angola	30 – 29	Portugal	Sportska Dvorana Topolica, Bar; Attendance: 200; Referees: Engberg, Delle (SWE)
16 August 2012; 16:00	Machado 8	(15–12)	Lopes, Oliveira 6	Sportska Dvorana Topolica, Bar; Attendance: 200; Referees: Engberg, Delle (SWE)
16 August 2012; 16:00	1× (yellow card) 4× (suspension)	Report	4× (yellow card) 3× (suspension)	Sportska Dvorana Topolica, Bar; Attendance: 200; Referees: Engberg, Delle (SWE)

17 August 2012; 13:45	Norway	34 – 21	Japan	Sportska Dvorana Topolica, Bar; Attendance: 200; Referees: Crnojević, Kostecki (CRO)
17 August 2012; 13:45	Grøtan 9	(18–10)	Sasaki 10	Sportska Dvorana Topolica, Bar; Attendance: 200; Referees: Crnojević, Kostecki (CRO)
17 August 2012; 13:45	3× (yellow card)	Report	3× (yellow card)	Sportska Dvorana Topolica, Bar; Attendance: 200; Referees: Crnojević, Kostecki (CRO)

17 August 2012; 16:00	Portugal	25 – 27	Brazil	Sportska Dvorana Topolica, Bar; Attendance: 200; Referees: Koo, Lee (KOR)
17 August 2012; 16:00	Valente 6	(15–18)	dos Santos 10	Sportska Dvorana Topolica, Bar; Attendance: 200; Referees: Koo, Lee (KOR)
17 August 2012; 16:00	3× (yellow card) 1× (suspension)	Report	3× (yellow card) 3× (suspension)	Sportska Dvorana Topolica, Bar; Attendance: 200; Referees: Koo, Lee (KOR)

18 August 2012; 18:15	Angola	14 – 37	Norway	Sportska Dvorana Topolica, Bar; Attendance: 400; Referees: Brkic, Jusufhodzic (AUT)
18 August 2012; 18:15	Machado, Venancio 3	(8–15)	Røsberg Jacobsen 7	Sportska Dvorana Topolica, Bar; Attendance: 400; Referees: Brkic, Jusufhodzic (AUT)
18 August 2012; 18:15	3× (yellow card) 3× (suspension)	Report	3× (yellow card) 1× (suspension)	Sportska Dvorana Topolica, Bar; Attendance: 400; Referees: Brkic, Jusufhodzic (AUT)

19 August 2012; 13:45	Brazil	24 – 23	Angola	Sportska Dvorana Topolica, Bar; Attendance: 200; Referees: Crnojević, Kostecki (CRO)
19 August 2012; 13:45	Pessoa 9	(15–14)	Machado 5	Sportska Dvorana Topolica, Bar; Attendance: 200; Referees: Crnojević, Kostecki (CRO)
19 August 2012; 13:45	4× (yellow card) 1× (suspension)	Report	3× (yellow card) 6× (suspension)	Sportska Dvorana Topolica, Bar; Attendance: 200; Referees: Crnojević, Kostecki (CRO)

19 August 2012; 16:00	Japan	33 – 26	Portugal	Sportska Dvorana Topolica, Bar; Attendance: 200; Referees: Allade, Dagba (BEN)
19 August 2012; 16:00	Tamura 9	(12–14)	Soares 9	Sportska Dvorana Topolica, Bar; Attendance: 200; Referees: Allade, Dagba (BEN)
19 August 2012; 16:00	2× (yellow card) 1× (suspension)	Report	3× (yellow card) 1× (suspension)	Sportska Dvorana Topolica, Bar; Attendance: 200; Referees: Allade, Dagba (BEN)

20 August 2012; 20:30	Portugal	26 – 41	Norway	Sportska Dvorana Topolica, Bar; Attendance: 200; Referees: Guzman, Perez (PUR)
20 August 2012; 20:30	Valente 8	(10–13)	Ingstad 7	Sportska Dvorana Topolica, Bar; Attendance: 200; Referees: Guzman, Perez (PUR)
20 August 2012; 20:30	3× (yellow card) 3× (suspension)	Report	3× (yellow card) 2× (suspension)	Sportska Dvorana Topolica, Bar; Attendance: 200; Referees: Guzman, Perez (PUR)

21 August 2012; 13:45	Norway	34 – 14	Brazil	Sportska Dvorana Topolica, Bar; Attendance: 200; Referees: Koo, Lee (KOR)
21 August 2012; 13:45	Grøtan 6	(13–8)	Pessoa 7	Sportska Dvorana Topolica, Bar; Attendance: 200; Referees: Koo, Lee (KOR)
21 August 2012; 13:45	2× (yellow card) 1× (suspension)	Report	3× (yellow card) 2× (suspension)	Sportska Dvorana Topolica, Bar; Attendance: 200; Referees: Koo, Lee (KOR)

21 August 2012; 16:00	Japan	34 – 25	Angola	Sportska Dvorana Topolica, Bar; Attendance: 200; Referees: Crnojević, Kostecki (CRO)
21 August 2012; 16:00	Sasaki 8	(21–12)	Cesar 8	Sportska Dvorana Topolica, Bar; Attendance: 200; Referees: Crnojević, Kostecki (CRO)
21 August 2012; 16:00	3× (yellow card) 2× (suspension)	Report	3× (yellow card) 4× (suspension)	Sportska Dvorana Topolica, Bar; Attendance: 200; Referees: Crnojević, Kostecki (CRO)

== Knockout stage ==
=== Championship ===
Quarterfinals
23 August
Hungary	28
Romania	33
23 August
Denmark	31
Japan	25
23 August
Russia	31
Sweden	30
23 August
Norway	32
France	19

Semifinals
25 August
Romania	28
Denmark	39
25 August
Russia	33
Norway	27

Final
26 August
Denmark	27
Russia	26
Third place
26 August
Romania	30
Norway	36

==== Quarterfinals ====
23 August 2012; 18:15	Hungary	28 – 33	Romania	Sportska Dvorana Topolica, Bar; Attendance: 400; Referees: Brkic, Jusufhodzic (AUT)
23 August 2012; 18:15	Szekerczés 9	(13–17)	Tiron 7	Sportska Dvorana Topolica, Bar; Attendance: 400; Referees: Brkic, Jusufhodzic (AUT)
23 August 2012; 18:15	3× (yellow card) 3× (suspension)	Report	3× (yellow card) 8× (suspension)	Sportska Dvorana Topolica, Bar; Attendance: 400; Referees: Brkic, Jusufhodzic (AUT)

23 August 2012; 18:15	Japan	25 – 31	Denmark	Morača Sports Center, Podgorica; Referees: Pavisević, Raznatović (MNE)
23 August 2012; 18:15	Sasaki 10	(17–15)	Offendal 8	Morača Sports Center, Podgorica; Referees: Pavisević, Raznatović (MNE)
23 August 2012; 18:15	3× (yellow card)	Report	4× (yellow card) 4× (suspension)	Morača Sports Center, Podgorica; Referees: Pavisević, Raznatović (MNE)

23 August 2012
20:30
Russia
31 – 30 (ET)
Sweden
Sportska Dvorana Topolica, Bar
Attendance: 800
Referees: Koo, Lee (KOR)
Vyakhireva 11
(12–13)
Eriksson 8
3× (yellow card) 7× (suspension)
Report
3× (yellow card) 2× (suspension)

FT: 26–26 ET: 5–4

23 August 2012; 20:30	France	19 – 32	Norway	Morača Sports Center, Podgorica; Attendance: 200; Referees: Santos, Foneseca (POR)
23 August 2012; 20:30	three players 3	(5–17)	Venn 6	Morača Sports Center, Podgorica; Attendance: 200; Referees: Santos, Foneseca (POR)
23 August 2012; 20:30	3× (yellow card) 1× (suspension)	Report	3× (yellow card) 3× (suspension)	Morača Sports Center, Podgorica; Attendance: 200; Referees: Santos, Foneseca (POR)

==== Semifinals ====
25 August 2012; 18:15	Romania	28 – 39	Denmark	Sportska Dvorana Topolica, Bar; Attendance: 400; Referees: Bethmann, Tzaferopoulos (GRE)
25 August 2012; 18:15	Pricopi, Safta 5	(15–19)	Tranborg 9	Sportska Dvorana Topolica, Bar; Attendance: 400; Referees: Bethmann, Tzaferopoulos (GRE)
25 August 2012; 18:15	3× (yellow card) 7× (suspension) 1× (red card)	Report	3× (yellow card) 3× (suspension)	Sportska Dvorana Topolica, Bar; Attendance: 400; Referees: Bethmann, Tzaferopoulos (GRE)

25 August 2012; 20:30	Russia	33 – 27	Norway	Sportska Dvorana Topolica, Bar; Attendance: 600; Referees: Koo, Lee (KOR)
25 August 2012; 20:30	Ikhneva 7	(18–12)	Arntzen 10	Sportska Dvorana Topolica, Bar; Attendance: 600; Referees: Koo, Lee (KOR)
25 August 2012; 20:30	3× (yellow card) 4× (suspension)	Report	4× (yellow card) 2× (suspension)	Sportska Dvorana Topolica, Bar; Attendance: 600; Referees: Koo, Lee (KOR)

==== Third place game ====
26 August 2012; 16:00	Romania	30 – 36	Norway	Sportska Dvorana Topolica, Bar; Attendance: 300; Referees: Crnojević, Kostecki (CRO)
26 August 2012; 16:00	Perianu 9	(13–17)	Arntzen 7	Sportska Dvorana Topolica, Bar; Attendance: 300; Referees: Crnojević, Kostecki (CRO)
26 August 2012; 16:00	3× (yellow card) 6× (suspension)	Report	3× (yellow card) 3× (suspension)	Sportska Dvorana Topolica, Bar; Attendance: 300; Referees: Crnojević, Kostecki (CRO)

==== Final ====
26 August 2012; 18:15	Denmark	27 – 26	Russia	Sportska Dvorana Topolica, Bar; Attendance: 2,000; Referees: Santos, Fonseca (POR)
26 August 2012; 18:15	Hansen 8	(15–12)	Vyakhireva 8	Sportska Dvorana Topolica, Bar; Attendance: 2,000; Referees: Santos, Fonseca (POR)
26 August 2012; 18:15	3× (yellow card) 3× (suspension)	Report	3× (yellow card) 5× (suspension)	Sportska Dvorana Topolica, Bar; Attendance: 2,000; Referees: Santos, Fonseca (POR)

=== 5–8th place playoffs ===
Semifinals
August 25
Hungary	30
Japan	25
August 25
Sweden	24
France	22

Fifth place
August 26
Hungary	31
Sweden	25
Seventh place
August 26
Japan	26
France	28

==== Semifinals ====
25 August 2012; 13:45	Hungary	30 – 25	Japan	Sportska Dvorana Topolica, Bar; Attendance: 300; Referees: Pavisević, Raznatović (MNE)
25 August 2012; 13:45	Sirián 9	(15–14)	Sasaki 8	Sportska Dvorana Topolica, Bar; Attendance: 300; Referees: Pavisević, Raznatović (MNE)
25 August 2012; 13:45	2× (yellow card) 3× (suspension)	Report	2× (yellow card) 1× (suspension)	Sportska Dvorana Topolica, Bar; Attendance: 300; Referees: Pavisević, Raznatović (MNE)

25 August 2012; 16:00	Sweden	24 – 22	France	Sportska Dvorana Topolica, Bar; Attendance: 300; Referees: Brkic, Jusufhodzic (AUT)
25 August 2012; 16:00	Eriksson 5	(13–12)	three players 5	Sportska Dvorana Topolica, Bar; Attendance: 300; Referees: Brkic, Jusufhodzic (AUT)
25 August 2012; 16:00	3× (yellow card) 1× (suspension)	Report	3× (yellow card) 2× (suspension)	Sportska Dvorana Topolica, Bar; Attendance: 300; Referees: Brkic, Jusufhodzic (AUT)

==== Seventh place game ====
26 August 2012; 11:30	Japan	26 – 28	France	Sportska Dvorana Topolica, Bar; Attendance: 200; Referees: Engberg, Delle (SWE)
26 August 2012; 11:30	Sasaki 10	(16–13)	Agathe 7	Sportska Dvorana Topolica, Bar; Attendance: 200; Referees: Engberg, Delle (SWE)
26 August 2012; 11:30	1× (yellow card)	Report	3× (yellow card) 1× (suspension)	Sportska Dvorana Topolica, Bar; Attendance: 200; Referees: Engberg, Delle (SWE)

==== Fifth place game ====
26 August 2012; 13:45	Hungary	31 – 25	Sweden	Sportska Dvorana Topolica, Bar; Attendance: 100; Referees: Allade, Dagba (BEN)
26 August 2012; 13:45	Sirián 8	(18–11)	Larsson 6	Sportska Dvorana Topolica, Bar; Attendance: 100; Referees: Allade, Dagba (BEN)
26 August 2012; 13:45	3× (yellow card) 2× (suspension)	Report	3× (yellow card) 1× (suspension)	Sportska Dvorana Topolica, Bar; Attendance: 100; Referees: Allade, Dagba (BEN)

=== 9–12th place playoffs ===
Semifinals
August 23
Netherlands	32
Montenegro	27
August 23
South Korea	29
Brazil	26

Ninth place
August 24
Netherlands	32
South Korea	33
Eleventh place
August 24
Montenegro	29
Brazil	28

==== Semifinals ====
23 August 2012; 16:00	Netherlands	32 – 27	Montenegro	Sportska Dvorana Topolica, Bar; Attendance: 300; Referees: Allade, Dagba (BEN)
23 August 2012; 16:00	Nieuwenweg 7	(15–14)	Despotović 9	Sportska Dvorana Topolica, Bar; Attendance: 300; Referees: Allade, Dagba (BEN)
23 August 2012; 16:00	3× (yellow card) 1× (suspension)	Report	2× (yellow card) 5× (suspension)	Sportska Dvorana Topolica, Bar; Attendance: 300; Referees: Allade, Dagba (BEN)

23 August 2012; 16:00	South Korea	29 – 26	Brazil	Morača Sports Center, Podgorica; Attendance: 50; Referees: Boualloucha, Khenissi (TUN)
23 August 2012; 16:00	Kim Su-jeong 9	(14–15)	dos Santos, da Silva Santos 5	Morača Sports Center, Podgorica; Attendance: 50; Referees: Boualloucha, Khenissi (TUN)
23 August 2012; 16:00	3× (yellow card) 3× (suspension)	Report	3× (yellow card) 9× (suspension)	Morača Sports Center, Podgorica; Attendance: 50; Referees: Boualloucha, Khenissi (TUN)

==== Eleventh place game ====
24 August 2012
11:30
Montenegro
29 – 28 (ET)
Brazil
Morača Sports Center, Podgorica
Attendance: 100
Referees: Boualloucha, Khenissi (TUN)
Despotović 11
(11–21)
dos Santos, Santana 7
2× (yellow card) 3× (suspension)
Report
4× (yellow card) 3× (suspension)

FT: 26–26 ET: 3–2

==== Ninth place game ====
24 August 2012; 13:45	Netherlands	32 – 33	South Korea	Morača Sports Center, Podgorica; Attendance: 100; Referees: Santos, Fonseca (POR)
24 August 2012; 13:45	Michielsen, Dulfer 8	(19–20)	Kim Su-jeong 12	Morača Sports Center, Podgorica; Attendance: 100; Referees: Santos, Fonseca (POR)
24 August 2012; 13:45	4× (yellow card) 7× (suspension)	Report	3× (yellow card) 4× (suspension)	Morača Sports Center, Podgorica; Attendance: 100; Referees: Santos, Fonseca (POR)

=== 13–16th place playoffs ===
Semifinals
August 23
Croatia	46
Kazakhstan	23
August 23
Czech Republic	27
Angola	20

13th place
August 24
Croatia	23
Czech Republic	26
15th place
August 24
Kazakhstan	30
Angola	35

==== Semifinals ====
23 August 2012; 13:45	Croatia	46 – 23	Kazakhstan	Sportska Dvorana Topolica, Bar; Attendance: 150; Referees: Engberg, Delle (SWE)
23 August 2012; 13:45	Marinović 11	(21–15)	Alexandrova 11	Sportska Dvorana Topolica, Bar; Attendance: 150; Referees: Engberg, Delle (SWE)
23 August 2012; 13:45	3× (yellow card) 1× (suspension)	Report	1× (yellow card)	Sportska Dvorana Topolica, Bar; Attendance: 150; Referees: Engberg, Delle (SWE)

23 August 2012; 13:45	Czech Republic	27 – 20	Angola	Morača Sports Center, Podgorica; Attendance: 100; Referees: Kulik, Nabokau (BLR)
23 August 2012; 13:45	four players 5	(8–13)	Leite 5	Morača Sports Center, Podgorica; Attendance: 100; Referees: Kulik, Nabokau (BLR)
23 August 2012; 13:45	3× (yellow card) 1× (suspension)	Report	3× (yellow card) 3× (suspension)	Morača Sports Center, Podgorica; Attendance: 100; Referees: Kulik, Nabokau (BLR)

==== 15th place game ====
24 August 2012; 16:00	Kazakhstan	30 – 35	Angola	Sportska Dvorana Topolica, Bar; Attendance: 100; Referees: Liu, Liu (CHN)
24 August 2012; 16:00	Alexandrova 11	(14–19)	Domingos, Pemba 8	Sportska Dvorana Topolica, Bar; Attendance: 100; Referees: Liu, Liu (CHN)
24 August 2012; 16:00	2× (yellow card) 2× (suspension)	Report	3× (yellow card) 4× (suspension)	Sportska Dvorana Topolica, Bar; Attendance: 100; Referees: Liu, Liu (CHN)

==== 13th place game ====
24 August 2012; 18:15	Croatia	23 – 26	Czech Republic	Sportska Dvorana Topolica, Bar; Attendance: 100; Referees: Kulik, Nabokau (BLR)
24 August 2012; 18:15	Masnić 6	(11–14)	Trumpešová, Pokorná 5	Sportska Dvorana Topolica, Bar; Attendance: 100; Referees: Kulik, Nabokau (BLR)
24 August 2012; 18:15	3× (yellow card) 1× (suspension)	Report	2× (yellow card) 4× (suspension)	Sportska Dvorana Topolica, Bar; Attendance: 100; Referees: Kulik, Nabokau (BLR)

=== 17–20th place playoffs ===
Semifinals
August 23
Paraguay	14
DR Congo	17
August 23
Uruguay	31
Portugal	29

17th place
August 24
DR Congo	26
Uruguay	32
20th place
August 24
Paraguay	16
Portugal	26

==== Semifinals ====
23 August 2012; 11:30	Paraguay	14 – 17	DR Congo	Sportska Dvorana Topolica, Bar; Attendance: 100; Referees: Guzmán, Perez (PUR)
23 August 2012; 11:30	Aluan 5	(7–8)	Betu 5	Sportska Dvorana Topolica, Bar; Attendance: 100; Referees: Guzmán, Perez (PUR)
23 August 2012; 11:30	2× (yellow card) 1× (suspension)	Report	2× (yellow card) 6× (suspension)	Sportska Dvorana Topolica, Bar; Attendance: 100; Referees: Guzmán, Perez (PUR)

23 August 2012; 11:30	Uruguay	31 – 29	Portugal	Morača Sports Center, Podgorica; Attendance: 100; Referees: Liu, Liu (CHN)
23 August 2012; 11:30	Barreiro 9	(20–14)	Faleiro 9	Morača Sports Center, Podgorica; Attendance: 100; Referees: Liu, Liu (CHN)
23 August 2012; 11:30	4× (yellow card) 2× (suspension)	Report	4× (yellow card) 3× (suspension)	Morača Sports Center, Podgorica; Attendance: 100; Referees: Liu, Liu (CHN)

==== 19th place game ====
24 August 2012; 11:30	Paraguay	16 – 26	Portugal	Sportska Dvorana Topolica, Bar; Attendance: 50; Referees: Kupa, Mobati (COD)
24 August 2012; 11:30	Acuña, Aluan 5	(6–12)	Soares 7	Sportska Dvorana Topolica, Bar; Attendance: 50; Referees: Kupa, Mobati (COD)
24 August 2012; 11:30	3× (yellow card) 4× (suspension)	Report	2× (yellow card) 6× (suspension)	Sportska Dvorana Topolica, Bar; Attendance: 50; Referees: Kupa, Mobati (COD)

==== 17th place game ====
24 August 2012; 13:45	DR Congo	26 – 32	Uruguay	Sportska Dvorana Topolica, Bar; Attendance: 50; Referees: Guzman, Perez (PUR)
24 August 2012; 13:45	Montili, Betu 5	(13–16)	Scarrone 12	Sportska Dvorana Topolica, Bar; Attendance: 50; Referees: Guzman, Perez (PUR)
24 August 2012; 13:45	3× (yellow card) 9× (suspension) 1× (red card)	Report	4× (yellow card) 1× (suspension)	Sportska Dvorana Topolica, Bar; Attendance: 50; Referees: Guzman, Perez (PUR)

== Final standings ==
Rank	Team
Gold medal	Denmark
Silver medal	Russia
Bronze medal	Norway
4	Romania
5	Hungary
6	Sweden
7	France
8	Japan
9	South Korea
10	Netherlands
11	Montenegro
12	Brazil
13	Czech Republic
14	Croatia
15	Angola
16	Kazakhstan
17	Uruguay
18	DR Congo
19	Portugal
20	Paraguay

=== Awards ===
MVP

- Anna Vyakhireva (RUS)

Topscorer

- Irina Alexandrova (KAZ) (62 goals)

All-star team

- Goalkeeper: Louise Egestorp (DEN)
- Right wing: Marit Røsberg Jacobsen (NOR)
- Right back: Rebecca Hejel (SWE)
- Central back: Nadia Offendal (DEN)
- Left back: Gabriela Perianu (ROU)
- Left wing: Ekaterina Chernova (RUS)
- Pivot: Kellya Zullemaro (FRA)
