= Michał Janiszewski (politician, born 1954) =

Polish politician (1954–2025)

Member of the Sejm
- In office 20 October 1997 – 18 October 2001
- In office 25 November 1991 – 31 May 1993

Personal details
- Born: 26 September 1954; Łochów, Poland
- Died: 14 January 2025 (aged 70)
- Political party: KPN
- Education: University of Warsaw

Michał Janiszewski (26 September 1954 – 14 January 2025) was a Polish politician. A member of the Confederation of Independent Poland, he served in the Sejm from 1991 to 1993 and again from 1997 to 2001.

Janiszewski died on 14 January 2025, at the age of 70.
